= Carleton Simmons =

Biographical details
- Born: June 4, 1905; Manchester, Vermont, U.S.
- Died: January 1, 1984 (aged 78); Sanibel, Florida, U.S.
- Education: Middlebury College

Playing career

Hockey
- 1925–1928: Middlebury

Baseball
- 1926–1927: Middlebury

Football
- 1925–1926: Middlebury
- Positions: Left Wing (hockey); Pitcher (baseball); Return specialist (football)

Coaching career (HC unless noted)

Hockey
- 1926–1928: Middlebury

Head coaching record
- Overall: 13–1 (.929)

Accomplishments and honors

Championships
- 1927 Vermont State Championship; 1928 Vermont State Championship

Carleton Hadley Simmons (June 4, 1905 - January 1, 1984) was an American athlete, coach and financier.

== Career ==
Born in Manchester, Vermont, Simmons grew up in Wellesley Hills, Massachusetts. He attended the nearby Noble and Greenough School before matriculating to Middlebury College in the fall of 1924. During his sophomore year, he joined three varsity teams: football, baseball and ice hockey. While he was a junior member of the former two, Simmons would soon find himself as the leader of the school's hockey team. After helping the Panthers post their first winning record on the ice, Simmons found himself in a unique position. With no juniors on the team and the other two sophomores having been academically suspended, Simmons was the only choice to be captain for the following fall. Because the school did not provide a separate coach for the program, they allowed the captain to serve in that capacity as well.

The following fall, Simmons was back on the football team, playing sparing for the club. During a scrimmage with the freshman team in October, Simmons broke his leg and was ruled out for the rest of the season. The fracture was expected to heal by mid-December, meaning that he would still have a chance to play with the hockey team. When the team opened their season just before Christmas, Simmons was cleared medically, but he was not up to shape and had to sit out the match. He was able to serve as a reserve for the second game but, thanks to a warm winter, the team had to delay many of their matches until February, giving Simmons time to fully recover. Once he was able, Simmons resumed his role as the starting Left Wing and helped the team down the stretch. Poor ice conditions limited the program to just 6 games for the year but Middlebury won every game. The team was declared as the Vermont State Champions and had a claim for the unofficial title of the best team at a small school. With their undefeated record, the student body voted to away major letters to ice hockey team in March, establishing the program as a priority for the athletic department.

After suiting up as a pitcher for the succeeding baseball season, Simmons departed from the two other teams to invest fully into his role as player/coach of the ice hockey team. In his final year with the program, Middlebury was again plagued by warm weather that prevented the club from getting any real practice time heading into their first games. The result was two 1-goal games in mid January and Middlebury was lucky to win one of them. However, once the squad had some workable ice, Simmons was able to shape the team into a formidable group. Over a 4-game stretch, the Panthers allowed just 1 goal and put themselves in the drivers seat for another state championship. In mid-February, the team would get one of the biggest test it ever had when Clarkson came to town. The New York State Champions were one of the best teams in the country, entering with a sparkling 8–0 record and were in consideration for the Intercollegiate championship. The two fought a hotly-contested game but, when the dust settled, Simmons' boys were victorious. After one final victory, Simmons wrapped up his tenure as coach with a 13–1 record, two State Championships and an enduring legacy at the college.

After graduation, Simmons began his career in finance. He joined the firm of Harris, Forbes & Co. in 1931, shortly before it was dissolved, and later accepted a partnership with E. M. Newton & Co. He was with that firm when it merged with Hayden, Stone & Co. in 1955 and continued until his retirement in 1972.

During his professional career, Simmons served on Middlebury's board of trustees from 1938 until 1972. Afterwards he was appointed as an emeritus trustee and received an alumni plaque for service to the college in 1983. He died at his home in Florida the following January.

== Personal ==
Carleton Simmons was a double legacy for Middlebury College with both his father Faye (class of '01) and mother Nellie (class of '02) being graduates. His married his wife, Elizabeth Cady (class of '29), in June 1931, having met her while they were both at college. Their daughter, Suzanne Simmons Daily, graduated from Middlebury in the class of 1954 as did her daughter, Diane Daily, in 1977. After his death, the family established the Carleton H. Simmons '28 Memorial Fund for the school's endowment.

== Career statistics ==
			Regular season
Season	Team	League	GP	G	A ^{†}	Pts
1925–26	Middlebury	Independent	8	2	–	2
1926–27	Middlebury	Independent	5	2	–	2
1927–28	Middlebury	Independent	8	?	?	?

† Assists were not officially recorded as a statistic until 1927

== Head coaching record ==
Record table
Season	Team	Overall	Conference	Standing	Postseason
Middlebury Panthers Independent (1926–1928)
1926–27	Middlebury	6–0–0			
1927–28	Middlebury	7–1–0			
Middlebury:		13–1–0			
Total:		13–1–0			
National champion Postseason invitational champion Conference regular season champion Conference regular season and conference tournament champion Division regular season champion Division regular season and conference tournament champion Conference tournament champion
