= 1927–28 Union Skating Dutchmen ice hockey season =

- Conference: Independent
- Home ice: Central Park Rink

Record
- Overall: 0–4–1
- Home: 0–1–0
- Road: 0–3–1

Coaches and captains
- Head coach: Harold A. Larrabee
- Captain: Drake Hyland

The 1927–28 Union Skating Dutchmen men's ice hockey season was the 15th season of play for the program. The Skating Dutchmen represented Union College and were coached by Harold A. Larrabee in his 3rd season.

== Season ==
After poor weather ruined any chance for home games in '27, Union began the season with a smaller schedule or just 7 games. team captain Drake Hyland was the team's most experienced player up front and he would have to lead the offense with two new starting wingers as his partners. Hopes for a good winter appeared to be dashed when the team was forced to use the Mohawk Golf Club's rink for practices because theirs was still out of commission in early January. Sure enough, the first two home games of the season were cancelled and the team opening with a delayed match at Rensselaer. Once they hit the ice, Union shot out of the gate and scored three goals in the first. Hyland finished off his hat-trick in the third but the team was unable to hold their lead and saw RIT answer every score. Bob Beale nearly netted the game winner in the waning moments of the match but a spectacular save kept the game tied. Due to fading light, no overtime was played and the two settled for a draw. Weather forced the postponement of the rematch with RPI and the team's next game required them to travel to Williams. The Garnet fought hard despite their lack of practice time but they were unable to overcome the early 2-goal lead by the Ephs. Hyland recorded the only goal for the Dutchmen.

During the exam break, the team finally got the cold weather needed for a home game and managed to meet Rensselaer for a rematch. Unfortunately, the absence of Bob Beale hampered the team's offensive ability while a broken skate for Jack Beale, his brother, kept an apt replacement out of the lineup for the first half. In that period, the team's defense was unable to stop the Engineers' offense and RPI rung up 3 goals in the first period. Rensselaer was then able to play defense for the rest of the match and skate away with a victory over Union. One bright spot was the appearance of Foster in goal for the Garnet. While the game started rough, he rounded into form as the match progressed and played a solid game in his first outing.

Unfortunately, the weather didn't hold and the team was unable to get any on-ice practice heading into their game with Hamilton. Despite their handicap, the Garnet kept he game close and were tied with the Continentals entering the third. In the final period the lack of conditioning proved fatal and the Dutchmen surrendered 3 goals for the third consecutive loss. A few days later, Union ended its season with a 4–7 loss to Cornell with poor weather ruining what could have been a solid season.

== Roster ==
| No. | Nat. | Player | Class | Pos | Height | Weight | DoB | Hometown | Previous team |
|---|---|---|---|---|---|---|---|---|---|
| | (United States) | John S. Beale | Sophomore | D | | | 1908-11-06 | Schenectady, New York |
| | (United States) | Robert B. Beale Jr. | Junior | LW | | | 1906-10-06 | Schenectady, New York |
| | | Conway |
| | | Drake | | D |
| | | DuBois | | D |
| | | Edward P. Foster Jr. | Freshman | G |
| | (United States) | Elmer D. Goodale | Senior | G | | | 1906-07-31 | Swanton, Vermont |
| | | Morton J. Henafelt | Sophomore | D/F | | | 1906-11-03 |
| | (United States) | Donald F. Hyland (C) | Senior | C | | | 1904-12-14 | Utica, New York |
| | (United States) | Arnold W. Kahn | Freshman | | | | 1909-04-07 | Waterville, Maine |
| | | James W. Kellogg Jr. | Junior | D |
| | | Paul E. Schultze Jr. | Senior | D |
| | | Ronald H. Smith | Sophomore |
| | | Roger T. Stone | Senior | LW/RW | | | 1906-04-05 |
| | | Weed | | G |

== Standings ==
1927–28 Eastern Collegiate ice hockey standings
| | Intercollegiate | | | | | | | Overall | | | | | |
| | GP | W | L | T | Pct. | GF | GA | GP | W | L | T | GF | GA |
|---|---|---|---|---|---|---|---|---|---|---|---|---|---|
| Amherst | 7 | 4 | 2 | 1 | .643 | 12 | 7 | 7 | 4 | 2 | 1 | 12 | 7 |
| Army | 8 | 1 | 7 | 0 | .125 | 6 | 36 | 9 | 1 | 8 | 0 | 9 | 44 |
| Bates | 10 | 5 | 5 | 0 | .500 | 21 | 26 | 12 | 6 | 5 | 1 | 26 | 28 |
| Boston College | 6 | 2 | 3 | 1 | .417 | 18 | 23 | 7 | 2 | 4 | 1 | 19 | 25 |
| Boston University | 9 | 6 | 2 | 1 | .722 | 42 | 23 | 9 | 6 | 2 | 1 | 42 | 23 |
| Bowdoin | 8 | 3 | 5 | 0 | .375 | 16 | 27 | 9 | 4 | 5 | 0 | 20 | 28 |
| Brown | – | – | – | – | – | – | – | 12 | 4 | 8 | 0 | – | – |
| Clarkson | 10 | 9 | 1 | 0 | .900 | 59 | 13 | 11 | 10 | 1 | 0 | 61 | 14 |
| Colby | 5 | 2 | 3 | 0 | .400 | 10 | 16 | 7 | 3 | 3 | 1 | 20 | 19 |
| Colgate | 4 | 0 | 4 | 0 | .000 | 4 | 18 | 4 | 0 | 4 | 0 | 4 | 18 |
| Cornell | 5 | 2 | 3 | 0 | .400 | 11 | 29 | 5 | 2 | 3 | 0 | 11 | 29 |
| Dartmouth | – | – | – | – | – | – | – | 10 | 6 | 4 | 0 | 64 | 23 |
| Hamilton | – | – | – | – | – | – | – | 8 | 5 | 2 | 1 | – | – |
| Harvard | 5 | 4 | 1 | 0 | .800 | 26 | 8 | 9 | 7 | 2 | 0 | 45 | 13 |
| Holy Cross | – | – | – | – | – | – | – | – | – | – | – | – | – |
| Massachusetts Agricultural | 6 | 0 | 6 | 0 | .000 | 5 | 17 | 6 | 0 | 6 | 0 | 5 | 17 |
| Middlebury | 7 | 6 | 1 | 0 | .857 | 27 | 10 | 8 | 7 | 1 | 0 | 36 | 11 |
| MIT | 5 | 1 | 3 | 1 | .300 | 7 | 36 | 5 | 1 | 3 | 1 | 7 | 36 |
| New Hampshire | 8 | 6 | 1 | 1 | .813 | 27 | 25 | 8 | 6 | 1 | 1 | 27 | 25 |
| Norwich | – | – | – | – | – | – | – | 4 | 0 | 2 | 2 | – | – |
| Princeton | – | – | – | – | – | – | – | 12 | 5 | 7 | 0 | – | – |
| Rensselaer | – | – | – | – | – | – | – | 4 | 2 | 1 | 1 | – | – |
| St. Lawrence | – | – | – | – | – | – | – | 4 | 2 | 2 | 0 | – | – |
| Syracuse | – | – | – | – | – | – | – | – | – | – | – | – | – |
| Union | 5 | 0 | 4 | 1 | .100 | 10 | 21 | 5 | 0 | 4 | 1 | 10 | 21 |
| Williams | 8 | 6 | 2 | 0 | .750 | 27 | 12 | 8 | 6 | 2 | 0 | 27 | 12 |
| Yale | 13 | 11 | 2 | 0 | .846 | 88 | 22 | 18 | 14 | 4 | 0 | 114 | 39 |
| YMCA College | 6 | 2 | 4 | 0 | .333 | 10 | 15 | 6 | 2 | 4 | 0 | 10 | 15 |

== Schedule and results ==
| Date | Opponent | Site | Result | Record |
Regular Season
| January 14 | at Rensselaer* | RPI Rink • Troy, New York (Rivalry) | T 4–4 | 0–0–1 |
| January 21 | at Williams* | Sage Hall Rink • Williamstown, Massachusetts | L 1–3 | 0–1–1 |
| February 11 | Rensselaer* | Central Park Rink • Schenectady, New York (Rivalry) | L 0–3 | 0–2–1 |
| February 18 | at Hamilton* | Russell Sage Rink • Clinton, New York | L 1–4 | 0–3–1 |
| February 25 | at Cornell* | Beebe Lake • Ithaca, New York | L 4–7 | 0–4–1 |
*Non-conference game.
