= 1927–28 New Hampshire Wildcats men's ice hockey season =

- Conference: Independent
- Home ice: UNH Ice Rink

Record
- Overall: 6–1–1
- Home: 1–0–1
- Road: 5–1–0

Coaches and captains
- Head coach: Ernest Christensen
- Assistant coaches: Edward Blewett
- Captain: Baron Chandler

The 1927–28 New Hampshire Wildcats men's ice hockey season was the 4th season of play for the program. The Wildcats represented the University of New Hampshire and were coached by Ernest Christensen in his 3rd season.

== Season ==
The Wildcats began the season in earnest with the first practice occurring at the beginning of December. Many of the key players from a year before returned for another year, however, Howard Crins, the top winger from last years squad, had transferred to Brown. In order to continue the teams winning ways, former starting goaltender Ed Blewett was brought back to campus as an assistant coach.

The team had scheduled a match in early January with Boston College but a thaw forced it to be cancelled. The warm weather persisted and also caused the second game against Bates to get nixed as well. While the cancellations were bad enough, the lack of ice also prevented the team from practicing. By the time the temperature finally dipped the Wildcats were only able to get a few hours on the ice ahead of their trip to Maine.

UNH opened its road trip against Colby with a solid performance, relying on the experience of its returning players like Percival and team captain Baron Chandler to carry the day. Towards the end of the match, Hunt got his first taste of game action in goal when he replaced John Rodgers. The following day, New Hampshire was set against Bates. In a fairly clean match, the two traded goals in the first period. The second, however, saw UNH begin to take over with goals from Reinhart and Chandler. The scoring continued in the third with Reinhart finishing off a hat-trick while Percival added one for himself. Because Bates had kept eh score close for most of the evening, coach Christensen declined to use any substitutes, which left the starters a bit tired for the final game of the trip. As a result, the team showed a distinct lack of scoring against Bowdoin. Fortunately, the defense was able to hold up and prevent the Polar Bears from taking advantage. Chandler got the team on the board in the second but the two sides remained tied at the beginning of the third. Dearington, who had returned to school for a second senior year, netted the only goal in the third period and allowed the team to return home without a loss.

The team had little time to recover before heading back out on the road and facing perhaps the best college team in the country. New Hampshire met Yale for the first time in program history and they swiftly saw their 9-game winning streak come to an end. Playing on an indoor rink for the first time in almost a year, the Wildcats were a bit unprepared for the speed of the game as well as the overpowering scoring from the Elis. UNH surrendered 3 goals to Ding Palmer, the lightning-quick Bulldog winger, in the first few minutes of the game. Yale kept the pressure on and buried the Wildcats under an avalanche of goals. The team was able to collect itself for a shot time in the second period and get goals from Reinhard and Percival but by then it was far too late to make any difference. On their return home, the team stopped off for a match with Brown. The game devolved into little more than a brawl for long stretched with little thought to scoring. The rough play appeared to catch the Bears off guard and disrupt their offense. Chandler opened the scoring in the last minute of the first and it took nearly a full period for Percival to double the lead. Brown joined in the scoring in the last minute of the second, however, Reinhart scored with just 3 seconds remaining to regain the 2-goal edge. That final marker proved fortuitous as the team was unable to find the net in the final period but Rodgers made some brilliant saves to keep his team ahead and win the match 3–2. After returning home, the team had some welcome news when the weather was good enough (barely) for their game against Massachusetts Agricultural to take place. On rough ice, the Wildcats continued their physical play that earned them a win against Brown and pushed the Aggies around all afternoon. The only time when the visitors were able to generate any offense was when the reserves were substituted in but that didn't stop the team from racking up another win.

After pausing for the exam period, the team got back to work and headed south for a match with YMCA College. The Wildcats began with a flurry, scoring four times in the first period and riding that early outburst to victory. Wendelin scored his first goals of the season in the match. The team was then supposed to play return matches with both Brown and YMCA, however, both matches were cancelled due to a lack of ice. It wasn't until late February that the Wildcats were able to play their final games of the season. The team managed to convince MIT to arrive a week after their game was scheduled to take place and participate in two games on the same day. While its unclear whether or not the first match was an exhibition or practice game, the second was an official match and resulted in a tie.

George Joslin served as team manager.

== Roster ==
No.	Nat.	Player	Class	Pos	Height	Weight	DoB	Hometown	Previous team
	(United States)	Roland F. Chandler (C)	Senior	D			1905-05-30	Winchester, New Hampshire
	(United States)	Searls Dearington	Senior	D			1903-04-04	Thompson, Connecticut
	(United States)	Leo F. Garvey	Senior	LW				Dover, New Hampshire
	(United States)	Edward H. Hunt	Junior	G			1904-11-22	Exeter, New Hampshire
	(United States)	Warren E. Percival	Senior	C			1904-07-21	Gorham, New Hampshire
	(United States)	Alvin R. Reinhart	Junior	LW			1907-06-23	Medfield, Massachusetts
	(United States)	John E. Rogers	Senior	G				Everett, Massachusetts
	(United States)	Carl G. Wendelin	Junior	RW			1905-09-05	Concord, New Hampshire
	(United States)	Eugene S. Winkler	Sophomore	RW			1905-11-14	Exeter, New Hampshire
	(United States)	Norman H. Young	Junior	C			1905-01-22	Portsmouth, New Hampshire

== Standings ==
1927–28 Eastern Collegiate ice hockey standings
	Intercollegiate							Overall					
	GP	W	L	T	Pct.	GF	GA	GP	W	L	T	GF	GA
Amherst	7	4	2	1	.643	12	7	7	4	2	1	12	7
Army	8	1	7	0	.125	6	36	9	1	8	0	9	44
Bates	10	5	5	0	.500	21	26	12	6	5	1	26	28
Boston College	6	2	3	1	.417	18	23	7	2	4	1	19	25
Boston University	9	6	2	1	.722	42	23	9	6	2	1	42	23
Bowdoin	8	3	5	0	.375	16	27	9	4	5	0	20	28
Brown	–	–	–	–	–	–	–	12	4	8	0	–	–
Clarkson	10	9	1	0	.900	59	13	11	10	1	0	61	14
Colby	5	2	3	0	.400	10	16	7	3	3	1	20	19
Colgate	4	0	4	0	.000	4	18	4	0	4	0	4	18
Cornell	5	2	3	0	.400	11	29	5	2	3	0	11	29
Dartmouth	–	–	–	–	–	–	–	10	6	4	0	64	23
Hamilton	–	–	–	–	–	–	–	8	5	2	1	–	–
Harvard	5	4	1	0	.800	26	8	9	7	2	0	45	13
Holy Cross	–	–	–	–	–	–	–	–	–	–	–	–	–
Massachusetts Agricultural	6	0	6	0	.000	5	17	6	0	6	0	5	17
Middlebury	7	6	1	0	.857	27	10	8	7	1	0	36	11
MIT	5	1	3	1	.300	7	36	5	1	3	1	7	36
New Hampshire	8	6	1	1	.813	27	25	8	6	1	1	27	25
Norwich	–	–	–	–	–	–	–	4	0	2	2	–	–
Princeton	–	–	–	–	–	–	–	12	5	7	0	–	–
Rensselaer	–	–	–	–	–	–	–	4	2	1	1	–	–
St. Lawrence	–	–	–	–	–	–	–	4	2	2	0	–	–
Syracuse	–	–	–	–	–	–	–	–	–	–	–	–	–
Union	5	0	4	1	.100	10	21	5	0	4	1	10	21
Williams	8	6	2	0	.750	27	12	8	6	2	0	27	12
Yale	13	11	2	0	.846	88	22	18	14	4	0	114	39
YMCA College	6	2	4	0	.333	10	15	6	2	4	0	10	15

== Schedule and results ==
Date	Opponent	Site	Result	Record
Regular Season
January 19	at Colby*	Colby Rink • Waterville, Maine	W 5–2	1–0–0
January 20	at Bates*	Bartlett Street Rink • Lewiston, Maine	W 5–3	2–0–0
January 21	at Bowdoin*	Delta Rink • Brunswick, Maine	W 2–1	3–0–0
January 24	at Yale*	New Haven Arena • New Haven, Connecticut	L 2–11	3–1–0
January 25	at Brown*	Rhode Island Auditorium • Providence, Rhode Island	W 3–2	4–1–0
January 27	Massachusetts Agricultural*	UNH Ice Rink • Durham, New Hampshire	W 4–2	5–1–0
February 4	at YMCA College*	West Side Arena • Springfield, Massachusetts	W 5–3	6–1–0
February 22	MIT*	UNH Ice Rink • Durham, New Hampshire (Exhibition)	W 6–1 ^{†}	
February 22	MIT*	UNH Ice Rink • Durham, New Hampshire	T 1–1 ^{OT}	6–1–1
*Non-conference game.

† The game took place in the morning with no mention of its occurrence by MIT. Its possible that it was used as a practice game as neither team had been able to get onto the ice for a long time prior to the 22nd.
