= 1927–28 Army Cadets men's ice hockey season =

- Conference: Independent
- Home ice: Bear Mountain Rink

Record
- Overall: 1–8–0
- Home: 1–8–0

Coaches and captains
- Head coach: Ray Marchand
- Captain: Tito Moscatelli

The 1927–28 Army Cadets men's ice hockey season was the 25th season of play for the program. The team was coached by Ray Marchand in his 5th season.

== Season ==
With all three defensive starters having graduated, coach Marchand moved McNamara back to the blueline to help out. He replaced on the forward line by Lindquist but that was the least of Army's worries. Once again, the team's chances were harmed by poor weather. While Stuart Rink was formed, the skating surface was just 10 feet wide at times and could barely be used for practice, let alone a game. Army had to travel south to use the rink at Bear Mountain for the opening match against Clarkson. In spite of the difficulties, the Cadets performed well and kept the game close, losing 0–1 with a strong game from Browning, who stopped 21 shots. When the weather didn't improve, there was little hope of getting their normal rink in any kind of usable condition. As a result, the team decided to use Bear Mountain as their home venue for the year.

After a second shutout loss to Bates, Army got their first win in almost two years when they defeated Massachusetts Agricultural College. Even at their new digs, however, Army couldn't escape poor ice conditions and most of their games devolved into a slog. A lack of practice time finally caught up to the team at the end of the month when Boston University visited. Being unable to get much cohesion going between the players, Army was dominated 0–9.

It was almost two weeks before the Cadets played their next game but the time off didn't appear to help. Despite Dartmouth having a bit of a down year, they were nonetheless able to overwhelm Army 1–12 and began a stretch of subpar play for the Cadets. Army played four games over a two-week span and lost them all. While the scores were close in the first two matches, Royal Military College was again too powerful for the Cadets, who finished their season with a poor effort against Williams. Army was only able to muster 8 shots on net, 1 more than the Ephs' total number of goals.

With a second consecutive season apparently ruined by poor weather, an increasing level of pressure was being put on the administration for the team to have better facilities.

John Oakes served as the team's manager.

== Roster ==
No.	Nat.	Player	Class	Pos	Height	Weight	DoB	Hometown	Previous team
	(United States)	William W. Browning	Senior	G			1904-07-29	Brooklyn, New York
	(United States)	Normando A. Costello	Junior				1905-06-19	Franklin, Massachusetts
	(United States)	Robert J. Dwyer	Senior	LW				Massachusetts
	(United States)	Rudolph Fink	Junior	D			1905-01-24	Nome, Alaska
	(United States)	Roy E. Lindquist	Sophomore	LW			1907-02-18	West Newton, Massachusetts
	(United States)	Andrew T. McNamara	Senior	D			1905-05-14	East Providence, Rhode Island
	(United States)	Tito C. Moscatelli (C)	Senior	C			1904-09-04	Cagli, Italy
	(United States)	Everett D. Peddicord	Senior				1905-02-21	Baltimore, Maryland
	(United States)	John A. Sawyer	Senior	RW			1904-03-21	Elizabeth, New Jersey
	(United States)	Donald M. Schorr	Junior	D				New Jersey

== Standings ==
1927–28 Eastern Collegiate ice hockey standings
	Intercollegiate							Overall					
	GP	W	L	T	Pct.	GF	GA	GP	W	L	T	GF	GA
Amherst	7	4	2	1	.643	12	7	7	4	2	1	12	7
Army	8	1	7	0	.125	6	36	9	1	8	0	9	44
Bates	10	5	5	0	.500	21	26	12	6	5	1	26	28
Boston College	6	2	3	1	.417	18	23	7	2	4	1	19	25
Boston University	9	6	2	1	.722	42	23	9	6	2	1	42	23
Bowdoin	8	3	5	0	.375	16	27	9	4	5	0	20	28
Brown	–	–	–	–	–	–	–	12	4	8	0	–	–
Clarkson	10	9	1	0	.900	59	13	11	10	1	0	61	14
Colby	5	2	3	0	.400	10	16	7	3	3	1	20	19
Colgate	4	0	4	0	.000	4	18	4	0	4	0	4	18
Cornell	5	2	3	0	.400	11	29	5	2	3	0	11	29
Dartmouth	–	–	–	–	–	–	–	10	6	4	0	64	23
Hamilton	–	–	–	–	–	–	–	8	5	2	1	–	–
Harvard	5	4	1	0	.800	26	8	9	7	2	0	45	13
Holy Cross	–	–	–	–	–	–	–	–	–	–	–	–	–
Massachusetts Agricultural	6	0	6	0	.000	5	17	6	0	6	0	5	17
Middlebury	7	6	1	0	.857	27	10	8	7	1	0	36	11
MIT	5	1	3	1	.300	7	36	5	1	3	1	7	36
New Hampshire	8	6	1	1	.813	27	25	8	6	1	1	27	25
Norwich	–	–	–	–	–	–	–	4	0	2	2	–	–
Princeton	–	–	–	–	–	–	–	12	5	7	0	–	–
Rensselaer	–	–	–	–	–	–	–	4	2	1	1	–	–
St. Lawrence	–	–	–	–	–	–	–	4	2	2	0	–	–
Syracuse	–	–	–	–	–	–	–	–	–	–	–	–	–
Union	5	0	4	1	.100	10	21	5	0	4	1	10	21
Williams	8	6	2	0	.750	27	12	8	6	2	0	27	12
Yale	13	11	2	0	.846	88	22	18	14	4	0	114	39
YMCA College	6	2	4	0	.333	10	15	6	2	4	0	10	15

== Schedule and results ==
Date	Opponent	Site	Result	Record
Regular Season
January 14	Bates*	Bear Mountain Rink • Bear Mountain, New York	L 0–2	0–1–0
January 17	Clarkson*	Bear Mountain Rink • Bear Mountain, New York	L 0–1	0–2–0
January 18	Massachusetts Agricultural*	Bear Mountain Rink • Bear Mountain, New York	W 3–0	1–2–0
January 25	Boston University*	Bear Mountain Rink • Bear Mountain, New York	L 0–9	1–3–0
January 28	Middlebury*	Bear Mountain Rink • Bear Mountain, New York	L 1–3 ^{†}	1–4–0
February 8	Dartmouth*	Bear Mountain Rink • Bear Mountain, New York	L 1–12	1–5–0
February	Amherst*	Bear Mountain Rink • Bear Mountain, New York	L 1–2 ^{2OT}	1–6–0
February 18	Royal Military College*	Bear Mountain Rink • Bear Mountain, New York	L 3–8	1–7–0
February 22	Williams*	Bear Mountain Rink • Bear Mountain, New York	L 0–7	1–8–0
*Non-conference game.

† Middlebury reported the final score being 0–3.
