= 1927–28 Massachusetts Agricultural Aggies men's ice hockey season =

- Conference: Independent
- Home ice: Alumni Field Rink

Record
- Overall: 0–6–0
- Home: 0–2–0
- Road: 0–4–0

Coaches and captains
- Head coach: Lorin Ball
- Captain: Joe Forest

The 1927–28 Massachusetts Agricultural Aggies men's ice hockey season was the 20th season of play for the program. The Aggies were coached by Lorin Ball in his 4th season.

== Season ==
As the season began, MAC was again having to deal with warm weather. As the team waited for ice to form, the candidates practiced in Drill Hall and tried to get ready for the first game. team captain Joe Forest was back along with Abrahamson and Frese, all of whom had two years of varsity play under their belts. Cook and Nash had both seen action the previous year and were expected to jump up into starting roles. The big question was who would take over in goal. Rudquist, last year's backup was available but so was Patch, a transfer from Dartmouth. The rink conditions didn't allow the team to get any on-ice training until early January but the team coalesced around their veterans.

The Alumni Field Rink was in good enough shape for the first match and saw MAC outplay Bates for much of the game. Unfortunately, the team was stymied time and again by the Garnet goaltender and were unable to find the twine. The story was much the same the following week when MAC travelled to meet Army. Poor ice prevented any real teamwork and the Aggie players were outclassed by the Cadets. After allowing a pair of quick goals in the third, Phinney was subbed in for Devine but that didn't spark any offensive pushback. Rounding out the road trip, the team made a stop in Clinton to take on Hamilton. On the first good ice of the season, the team looked more composed and played a solid defensive game. Phinney looked good in his first start while Forest got the Aggies on the board for the first time all season. However, their efforts were not enough to save MAC and the team lost once more.

The following week saw the team play two games on back-to-back nights. To add to the difficulty score, the first matches were road games and forced the team to take an overnight train for the second before playing on short rest. The first of the two contests was against New Hampshire. The Wildcats were a much bigger team than MAC, averaging about 30 pounds heavier, and used their size to their advantage. UNH pushed the Aggies around on rough ice and built a comfortable lead by the start of the third. After the home team inserted subs into the lineup, captain Forest swiftly caged a pair of goals in about 1 minute to get the team within striking distance. The quick outburst forced the Wildcat starters back into the game and they nursed what remained of their lead to the end of the game. The second contest was played on a much better surface and MAC battled Bates hard in a rematch. The two were mostly even through the first two periods, however, the Aggies began to tire in the third and were eventually outpaced by the Bobcats.

After a few days rest, the team played host to Amherst on a very cold day. With the ice in about as good of shape as it had been all season, the game was fast. Unfortunately, from the start it was apparent that the Lord Jeffs were the better of the two and the Sabrinas gave few opportunities to the Aggies. Amherst scored in each period and had total control of the game thanks to their oppressive defense. Patch got MAC on the board with just 20 seconds left in the game to prevent a shutout but that didn't stop the team from dropping its sixth consecutive game. There were still a few games left on the schedule, however, the weather turned afterwards and made it impossible to play any of those matches. In terms of winning percentage, this was the worst season in the history of the program despite the fact that the team had not played particularly poorly during the year.

James Cunningham served as team manager.

== Roster ==
No.	Nat.	Player	Class	Pos	Height	Weight	DoB	Hometown	Previous team
	(United States)	Howard J. Abrahamson	Senior	D				Waltham, Massachusetts
	(United States)	Richard H. Bond Jr.	Sophomore	D				Dover, Massachusetts
	(United States)	Albert C. Cook	Senior	RW			1902-06-03	Waverley, Massachusetts
	(United States)	John W. Devine	Junior	G				Arlington, Massachusetts
	(United States)	Joseph H. Forest (C)	Senior	RW			1906-07-06	Arlington, Massachusetts
	(United States)	Paul F. Frese	Senior	C				Waltham, Massachusetts
	(United States)	Robley W. Nash	Junior	D				Abington, Massachusetts
	(United States)	Eldred K. Patch	Junior	LW			1906-08-24	Stoneham, Massachusetts
	(United States)	Paul T. Phinney	Sophomore	G			1908-03-23	Hyde Park, Massachusetts
	(United States)	William G. Pillsbury	Sophomore	LW				Amesbury, Massachusetts
	(United States)	Peter H. Waechter Jr.	Sophomore	LW			1909-06-11	Walpole, Massachusetts
	(United States)	Albert P. Zuger	Sophomore	RW			1907-03-11	New Haven, Connecticut

== Standings ==
1927–28 Eastern Collegiate ice hockey standings
	Intercollegiate							Overall					
	GP	W	L	T	Pct.	GF	GA	GP	W	L	T	GF	GA
Amherst	7	4	2	1	.643	12	7	7	4	2	1	12	7
Army	8	1	7	0	.125	6	36	9	1	8	0	9	44
Bates	10	5	5	0	.500	21	26	12	6	5	1	26	28
Boston College	6	2	3	1	.417	18	23	7	2	4	1	19	25
Boston University	9	6	2	1	.722	42	23	9	6	2	1	42	23
Bowdoin	8	3	5	0	.375	16	27	9	4	5	0	20	28
Brown	–	–	–	–	–	–	–	12	4	8	0	–	–
Clarkson	10	9	1	0	.900	59	13	11	10	1	0	61	14
Colby	5	2	3	0	.400	10	16	7	3	3	1	20	19
Colgate	4	0	4	0	.000	4	18	4	0	4	0	4	18
Cornell	5	2	3	0	.400	11	29	5	2	3	0	11	29
Dartmouth	–	–	–	–	–	–	–	10	6	4	0	64	23
Hamilton	–	–	–	–	–	–	–	8	5	2	1	–	–
Harvard	6	5	1	0	.833	28	8	9	7	2	0	45	13
Holy Cross	–	–	–	–	–	–	–	–	–	–	–	–	–
Massachusetts Agricultural	6	0	6	0	.000	5	17	6	0	6	0	5	17
Middlebury	7	6	1	0	.857	27	10	8	7	1	0	36	11
MIT	5	1	3	1	.300	7	36	5	1	3	1	7	36
New Hampshire	8	6	1	1	.813	27	25	8	6	1	1	27	25
Norwich	–	–	–	–	–	–	–	4	0	2	2	–	–
Princeton	–	–	–	–	–	–	–	12	5	7	0	–	–
Rensselaer	–	–	–	–	–	–	–	4	2	1	1	–	–
St. Lawrence	–	–	–	–	–	–	–	4	2	2	0	–	–
Syracuse	–	–	–	–	–	–	–	–	–	–	–	–	–
Union	5	0	4	1	.100	10	21	5	0	4	1	10	21
Williams	8	6	2	0	.750	27	12	8	6	2	0	27	12
Yale	13	11	2	0	.846	88	22	18	14	4	0	114	39
YMCA College	6	2	4	0	.333	10	15	6	2	4	0	10	15

== Schedule and results ==
Date	Opponent	Site	Result	Record
Regular Season
January 12	Bates*	Alumni Field Rink • Amherst, Massachusetts	L 0–2	0–1–0
January 18	at Army*	Bear Mountain Rink • Bear Mountain, New York	L 0–3	0–2–0
January 21	at Hamilton*	Russell Sage Rink • Clinton, New York	L 1–2	0–3–0
January 27	at New Hampshire*	UNH Ice Rink • Durham, New Hampshire	L 2–4	0–4–0
January 28	at Bates*	Bartlett Street Rink • Lewiston, Maine	L 1–2	0–5–0
January 29	Amherst*	Alumni Field Rink • Amherst, Massachusetts	L 1–4	0–6–0
*Non-conference game.

== Scoring statistics ==
Name	Position	Games	Goals
Joe Forest	RW	-	3
Robby Nash	D	-	1
Chub Patch	LW	-	1
Howard Abrahamson	D	-	0
Richard Bond	D	-	0
Al Cook	RW	-	0
John Devine	G	-	0
Paul Frese	C	-	0
Paul Phinney	G	-	0
William Pillsbury	LW	-	0
Peter Waechter	LW	-	0
Al Zuger	RW	-	0
Total			5
