= 1927–28 YMCA College Maroons men's ice hockey season =

- Conference: Independent
- Home ice: West Side Arena

Record
- Overall: 2–4–0
- Home: 1–2–0
- Road: 1–2–0

Coaches and captains
- Head coach: Frank E. Carroll
- Captain: Paul Crowell

The 1927–28 YMCA College Maroons men's ice hockey season was the 21st season of play for the program.

== Season ==
While things seemed good at the outset, trouble was brewing for the program. The team was able to retain the services of Frank Carroll as coach while he also served as the bench boss for the Springfield Indians. While the hope of stability was lost due to the collapse of the New England Intercollegiate Hockey League, YMCA was able to work out a deal to use the West Side Arena for their home games. Unfortunately, with high demand for ice time, the Maroons weren't able to get much practice time at the Arena. A lack of a local rink combined with a warm winter caused the team to have very little in the way of on-ice practices leading into the season.

In part due to the dearth of ice, YMCA opened their season in late January with a game against Holy Cross. The Maroons played well in the game but were outclassed by a faster team. Unable to keep up with the Crusaders, YMCA couldn't generate much offense and were shutout by the purple invaders. YMCA continued to show improvement when they hit the road for the first time. Williams, who had easily beaten the Maroons the year before, needed to fend off a furious attack in the final period. After the Ephs had built a 3-goal lead, the offense finally began to show signs of life when Johnson fired a pass from team captain Crowell into the net. A few minutes later Crowell put his team within one and sent Williams scrambling to hold onto their lead. Unfortunately for YMCA, the final buzzer sounded before they could get the tying goal. Both the offense and defense showed up in the next game at Brown. While liting the BEars to just one goal, the Maroons caged two in the second in quick succession and then hung on desperately to earn their first win of the season. Al Lang was the hero of the game, turning aside a bevy of shots in the third period to preserve the lead.

The following week the team played host to New Hampshire and swiftly found themselves down by 3 goals. Johnson was able to cut into the lead and stop the bleeding but after exchanging two more goals, the Maroons were still down by a pair. The Wildcats were able to play a solid defensive game for the final two periods and stop all but one shot from YMCA, a third goal from Johnson. the Maroons then took a short jaunt to Amherst and were locked into a close battle with the Lord Jeffs all evening. The Dinty Flint scored in the second to match an earlier goal from the Sabrinas and neither team was able to add to their totals in the third. A 10-minute overtime was arranged but resulted in no goals. A second was institutes but that turned out bad for the Maroons. Cameron, the Amherst captain, scored to give his team the lead and then added a second marker about 5 minutes later. Nothing that YMCA tried found its way into the cage and the Maroons lost in heartbreaking fashion.

Once again, the final match of the year came against Rensselaer and ended with a 2–0 score. Wilbur Johnson remained the top offensive threat for the Maroons, scoring both goals to give his team the win. Unfortunately, the win turned out to be the last for a long time for the college as the ice hockey program was shuttered after the season. Due to the lack of available ice, the team was mothballed for the better part of a decade and wouldn't return until 1936.

R. W. Miller served as team manager.

== Roster ==
No.	Nat.	Player	Class	Pos	Height	Weight	DoB	Hometown	Previous team
	(United States)	Paavo H. Atlin	Senior	D			1905-07-22	Fitchburg, Massachusetts
	(United States)	Roy B. Clogston	Senior	D			1904-04-10	Ballston Lake, New York
	(United States)	Paul G. Crowell	Junior	D			1904-01-20	Concord, New Hampshire
	(United States)	George E. Flint	Junior	LW				Melrose Highlands, Massachusetts
	(United States)	Wilbur H. Johnson	Junior	RW				Mansfield, Massachusetts
	(Canada)	William E. Lang	Senior	G				St. Thomas, Ontario
	(Canada)	Robert J. MacKinnon	Sophomore	D/C				Sydney, Nova Scotia
	(United States)	William H. Pendleton	Senior	C/RW				Springfield, Massachusetts
	(Canada)	James C. Ready	Sophomore	G				St. Mary's, Ontario
	(United States)	George A. Springer	Senior	LW/RW				Tenafly, New Jersey

== Standings ==
1927–28 Eastern Collegiate ice hockey standings
	Intercollegiate							Overall					
	GP	W	L	T	Pct.	GF	GA	GP	W	L	T	GF	GA
Amherst	7	4	2	1	.643	12	7	7	4	2	1	12	7
Army	8	1	7	0	.125	6	36	9	1	8	0	9	44
Bates	10	5	5	0	.500	21	26	12	6	5	1	26	28
Boston College	6	2	3	1	.417	18	23	7	2	4	1	19	25
Boston University	9	6	2	1	.722	42	23	9	6	2	1	42	23
Bowdoin	8	3	5	0	.375	16	27	9	4	5	0	20	28
Brown	–	–	–	–	–	–	–	12	4	8	0	–	–
Clarkson	10	9	1	0	.900	59	13	11	10	1	0	61	14
Colby	5	2	3	0	.400	10	16	7	3	3	1	20	19
Colgate	4	0	4	0	.000	4	18	4	0	4	0	4	18
Cornell	5	2	3	0	.400	11	29	5	2	3	0	11	29
Dartmouth	–	–	–	–	–	–	–	10	6	4	0	64	23
Hamilton	–	–	–	–	–	–	–	8	5	2	1	–	–
Harvard	6	5	1	0	.833	28	8	9	7	2	0	45	13
Holy Cross	–	–	–	–	–	–	–	–	–	–	–	–	–
Massachusetts Agricultural	6	0	6	0	.000	5	17	6	0	6	0	5	17
Middlebury	7	6	1	0	.857	27	10	8	7	1	0	36	11
MIT	5	1	3	1	.300	7	36	5	1	3	1	7	36
New Hampshire	8	6	1	1	.813	27	25	8	6	1	1	27	25
Norwich	–	–	–	–	–	–	–	4	0	2	2	–	–
Princeton	–	–	–	–	–	–	–	12	5	7	0	–	–
Rensselaer	–	–	–	–	–	–	–	4	2	1	1	–	–
St. Lawrence	–	–	–	–	–	–	–	4	2	2	0	–	–
Syracuse	–	–	–	–	–	–	–	–	–	–	–	–	–
Union	5	0	4	1	.100	10	21	5	0	4	1	10	21
Williams	8	6	2	0	.750	27	12	8	6	2	0	27	12
Yale	13	11	2	0	.846	88	22	18	14	4	0	114	39
YMCA College	6	2	4	0	.333	10	15	6	2	4	0	10	15

== Schedule and results ==
Date	Opponent	Site	Result	Record
Regular Season
January 20	Holy Cross*	West Side Arena • Springfield, Massachusetts	L 0–3	0–1–0
January 25	at Williams*	Sage Hall Rink • Williamstown, Massachusetts	L 2–3	0–2–0
January 28	at Brown*	Rhode Island Auditorium • Providence, Rhode Island	W 2–1	1–2–0
February 3	New Hampshire*	West Side Arena • Springfield, Massachusetts	L 3–5	1–3–0
February 4	at Amherst*	Pratt Field Rink • Amherst, Massachusetts	L 1–3 ^{2OT}	1–4–0
February 24	Rensselaer*	West Side Arena • Springfield, Massachusetts	W 2–0	2–4–0
*Non-conference game.
