= 1927–28 Williams Ephs men's ice hockey season =

College ice hockey team season

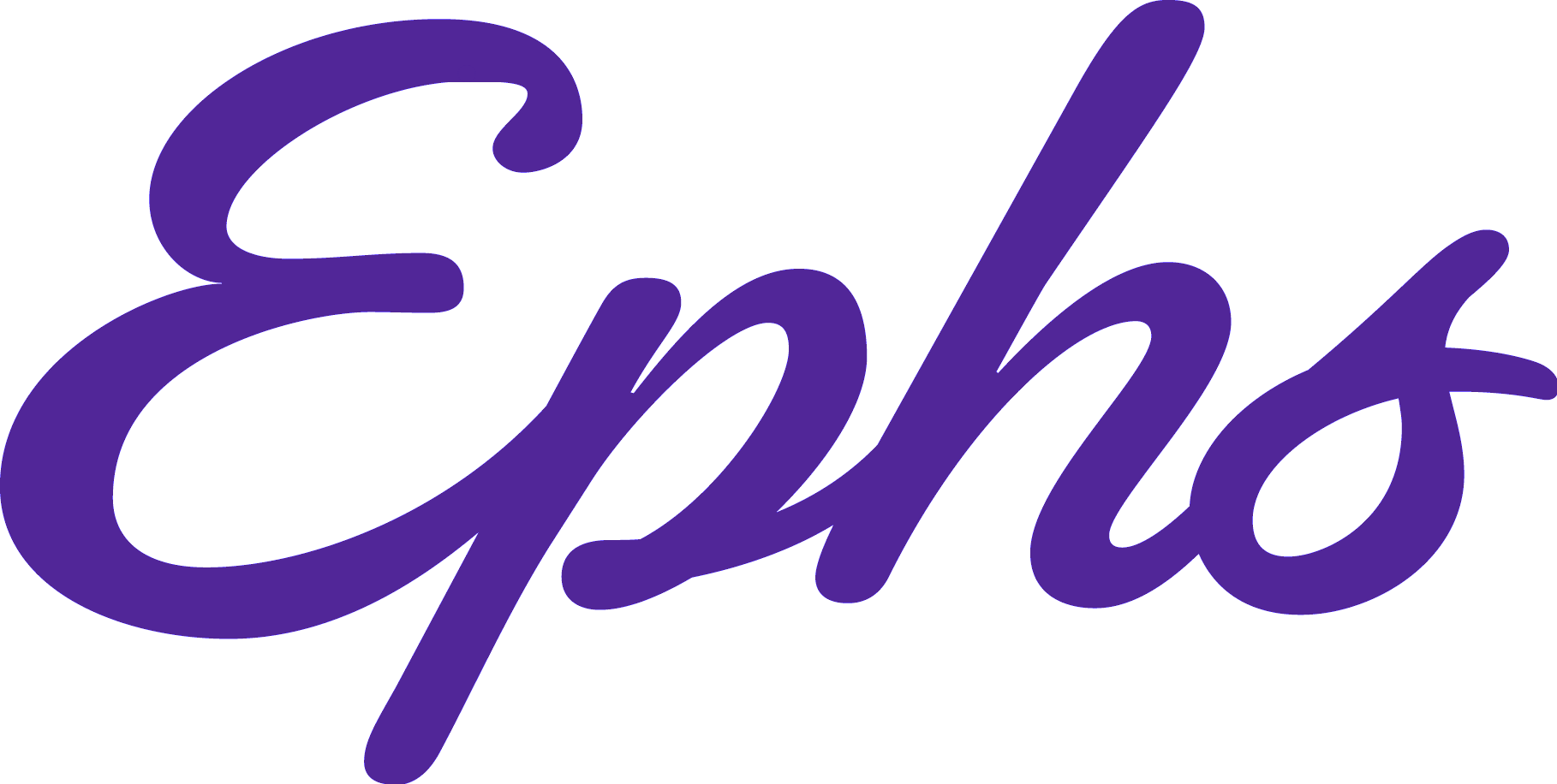
- Conference: Independent
- Home ice: Sage Hall Rink

Record
- Overall: 6–2–0
- Home: 3–0–0
- Road: 3–1–0
- Neutral: 0–1–0

Coaches and captains
- Head coach: Leo Bellerose
- Captain: William Blaney

The 1927–28 Williams Ephs men's ice hockey season was the 25th season of play for the program.

== Season ==
As the team lost just one player to graduation (Leonard Smith), and had their coach returning for a second season, Williams entered the season with high expectations. As they had in each of the previous three seasons, Williams was going to begin the season in Lake Placid. With this in mind, the team held their first meeting after Thanksgiving to prepare for the upcoming season. The early start meant that the Ephs had no ice available at the time, however, while that unwelcome news was a common occurrence for the team, another issue was very surprising. McGill had started putting together an international coalition of colleges that included the likes of Toronto, Princeton and Yale with the intention of forming a conference. What might have come as a shock was that Williams, despite being a small college, was invited to join the potential league as well. The Ephs were rather flattered to receive the invitation but thought that their inclusion may have been premature as the team still did not possess a permanent home rink. Furthering the increase in prominence for the program was the debate in early December as to whether the hockey and basketball teams would be promoted to 'major' status within the athletic department. While no definitive decision was reached, the prospect of building an enclosed arena for the team was brought up as a distinct possibility.

While the overall condition of the program was being debated, the team was suffering through another too-warm winter. The lack of ice made training very difficult and the team had precious little time together before they headed to upstate New York. 13 players made the trip for the 3-game series with Dartmouth. Unfortunately, after just one day of skiing, all athletic events were cancelled due to poor weather conditions. The team was then expecting to play its first game at home against Middlebury on January 11, however, the weather prevented both that and a subsequent game against Massachusetts Agricultural from taking place and the Ephs weren't able to play its first match until the 18th.

While the team waited for its first game, they had to consign themselves to practicing in the gymnasium. While they were able to stay in shape, the team had no ability to work on their skating or teamwork which, as past years had proven, were vital for the success of the Ephs. When they were finally able to play their first match, the game at Amherst had to be played on one of the temporary rinks on Massachusetts Agricultural's football field. The ice was soft, choppy and covered in puddles. The barely-usable surface rendered the game a slow slog with both teams also suffering from little practice time. The only goal of the game came off of a shot from center ice that ricocheted off of a Williams player into the Purple net. Despite the issues, the game saw decent performances from the top line of Hoyt, Blaney and Smith.

Due to poor weather in New York, the next game was moved from Schenectady to Williamstown. Williams returned home and mercifully found that the ice on Sage Hall Rink was solid. Due to the game's late start, the final period, which lasted just 5 minutes, was played under the floodlights. With all of those changes the Ephs were able to secure their first win of the season. Hutchins turned aside a bevy of chances early in the game while Howe and Shepler found their skating legs. Brigham, who had replaced Hoyt as the starting left wing, opened the scoring near the end of the first and Williams gradually took over the game afterwards. Despite having two goals waved off in the later stages, the three Purple goals were more than enough to earn a win. With their next match being the final one before the exam break, Williams rounded out a difficult first half of their season with a 3–2 win over YMCA College. Williams was able to jump out to a 3–0 lead with a dominating style in the first two periods. The entire team was substituted in the third period which, on an account of darkness, was limited to just 10 minutes. Luckily, that curtailed the comeback from the Garnet as reserve netminder Watters allowed two goals in the final frame but the b-team was able to prevent the tying goal from being scored.

The team was supposed to play its rematch with Amherst on February 8, however, rain forced that contest to be postponed until after the team returned from its trip west. The time off appeared to work wonder on the Ephs as Williams was easily the better team in both games of their trip. Blaney, Hoyt and Smith each scored 2 goals against Cornell despite soft ice and the team overwhelmed the Big Red in the first and third periods. The following evening, Williams had a much tougher challenge from Hamilton but another pair of marker from Blaney led the team to victory.

Williams travelled south for their biggest test of the season and had high hopes for the match versus Princeton. Unfortunately, the Tigers put up their best performance of the season and handed Williams a convincing 1–5 defeat. While they were playing on the best ice they had seen all season, Williams had grown accustomed to rough or soft ice and were unprepared for the different circumstances. A lack of practice time ahead of the match didn't help either. While the multitude of substitutes used by the Ephs helped the Purple stave off exhaustion in the 60-minute match, the offense and defense, degraded by the absences of Smith and Shepler respectively, were unable to withstand the Princeton attack.

With the season coming to a close, the second Amherst game was finally staged but neither team appeared ready for the match. The game was described as both listless and disorganized though Williams was visibly the better of the two. In a reversal of the earlier match, Blaney scored in the third to provide the only marker as the Ephs avenged the season-opening loss. The following evening, the team showed a far superior effort and overpowered Army in the season finale. Howe's first goal of the season opened the scoring and the Purple never looked back, keeping the Cadets hemmed in their own end for most of the game. The victory capped off a rather successful season for the Ephs despite being curtailed by the weather.

William Eaton served as team manager with Andrew Williamson as his assistant.

== Roster ==
No.	Nat.	Player	Class	Pos	Height	Weight	DoB	Hometown	Previous team
	(United States)	Henry L. Ballou	Junior	RW			1905-12-22	Woonsocket, Rhode Island
	(United States)	Talcott M. Banks Jr.	Senior	D				Williamstown, Massachusetts
	(United States)	William O. Blaney (C)	Senior	C			1905-09-15	Waban, Massachusetts
	(United States)	H. Prescott Brigham Jr.	Junior	LW				West Newton, Massachusetts
	(United States)	Robert H. Field	Junior	LW				Providence, Rhode Island
	(United States)	Robert P. Hazzard Jr.	Sophomore	D/LW			1908-10-07	Gardiner, Maine
	(United States)	Dunton Howe	Junior	D				Providence, Rhode Island
	(United States)	Franklin K. Hoyt	Sophomore	LW			1907-09-11	West Newton, Massachusetts
	(United States)	Curtis M. Hutchins	Senior	G			1907-04-23	Newton, Massachusetts
	(United States)	George L. Nye	Junior	C/RW				Minneapolis, Minnesota
	(United States)	Dwight C. Shepler	Senior	D			1905-08-11	Newton Center, Massachusetts
	(United States)	Darwin A. Smith	Sophomore	RW			1907-10-14	Brooklyn, New York
	(United States)	Preston H. Watters	Junior	G			1907-01-12	West Roxbury, Massachusetts
	(United States)	Daniel F. Wheeler Jr.	Sophomore	RW			1907-05-05	Bridgeport, Connecticut

== Standings ==
1927–28 Eastern Collegiate ice hockey standings
	Intercollegiate							Overall					
	GP	W	L	T	Pct.	GF	GA	GP	W	L	T	GF	GA
Amherst	7	4	2	1	.643	12	7	7	4	2	1	12	7
Army	8	1	7	0	.125	6	36	9	1	8	0	9	44
Bates	10	5	5	0	.500	21	26	12	6	5	1	26	28
Boston College	6	2	3	1	.417	18	23	7	2	4	1	19	25
Boston University	9	6	2	1	.722	42	23	9	6	2	1	42	23
Bowdoin	8	3	5	0	.375	16	27	9	4	5	0	20	28
Brown	–	–	–	–	–	–	–	12	4	8	0	–	–
Clarkson	10	9	1	0	.900	59	13	11	10	1	0	61	14
Colby	5	2	3	0	.400	10	16	7	3	3	1	20	19
Colgate	4	0	4	0	.000	4	18	4	0	4	0	4	18
Cornell	5	2	3	0	.400	11	29	5	2	3	0	11	29
Dartmouth	–	–	–	–	–	–	–	10	6	4	0	64	23
Hamilton	–	–	–	–	–	–	–	8	5	2	1	–	–
Harvard	5	4	1	0	.800	26	8	9	7	2	0	45	13
Holy Cross	–	–	–	–	–	–	–	–	–	–	–	–	–
Massachusetts Agricultural	6	0	6	0	.000	5	17	6	0	6	0	5	17
Middlebury	7	6	1	0	.857	27	10	8	7	1	0	36	11
MIT	5	1	3	1	.300	7	36	5	1	3	1	7	36
New Hampshire	8	6	1	1	.813	27	25	8	6	1	1	27	25
Norwich	–	–	–	–	–	–	–	4	0	2	2	–	–
Princeton	–	–	–	–	–	–	–	12	5	7	0	–	–
Rensselaer	–	–	–	–	–	–	–	4	2	1	1	–	–
St. Lawrence	–	–	–	–	–	–	–	4	2	2	0	–	–
Syracuse	–	–	–	–	–	–	–	–	–	–	–	–	–
Union	5	0	4	1	.100	10	21	5	0	4	1	10	21
Williams	8	6	2	0	.750	27	12	8	6	2	0	27	12
Yale	13	11	2	0	.846	88	22	18	14	4	0	114	39
YMCA College	6	2	4	0	.333	10	15	6	2	4	0	10	15

== Schedule and results ==
Date	Opponent	Site	Result	Record
Regular Season
January 18	vs. Amherst*	Alumni Field Rink • Amherst, Massachusetts	L 0–1	0–1–0
January 21	Union*	Sage Hall Rink • Williamstown, Massachusetts	W 3–1	1–1–0
January 25	YMCA College*	Sage Hall Rink • Williamstown, Massachusetts	W 3–2	2–1–0
February 10	at Cornell*	Beebe Lake • Ithaca, New York	W 7–1	3–1–0
February 11	at Hamilton*	Russell Sage Rink • Clinton, New York	W 5–2	4–1–0
February 18	at Princeton*	Hobey Baker Memorial Rink • Princeton, New Jersey	L 1–5	4–2–0
February 21	Amherst*	Sage Hall Rink • Williamstown, Massachusetts	W 1–0	5–2–0
February 22	at Army*	Bear Mountain Rink • Bear Mountain, New York	W 7–0	6–2–0
*Non-conference game.

== Scoring statistics ==
Name	Position	Games	Goals
William Blaney	C	8	9
Prescott Brigham	LW	7	6
Darwin Smith	RW	5	3
Dwight Shepler	D	5	3
Jim Hoyt	LW	8	3
Dunton Howe	D	8	2
Henry Ballou	RW	7	1
Robert Field	LW	1	0
Talcott Banks	D	4	0
Preston Watters	G	4	0
Daniel Wheeler	RW	6	0
Robert Hazzard	D/LW	7	0
George Nye	C/RW	8	0
Curtis Hutchins	G	8	0
Total			27
