= 1927–28 MIT Engineers men's ice hockey season =

- Conference: Independent
- Home ice: Boston Arena

Record
- Overall: 1–3–1
- Road: 0–2–1
- Neutral: 1–1–0

Coaches and captains
- Head coach: Bill Stewart
- Captain: Ralph Crosby

The 1927–28 MIT Engineers men's ice hockey season was the 27th season of play for the program. The Engineers were coached by Bill Stewart in his 3rd season.

== Season ==
When MIT hit the ice for their first preseason practice in early November, coach Stewart had more than 40 candidates to pick from. He would have to completely remake the defense as all three of last years' starters had graduated. With nearly a month before their first game, the team had ample opportunity to round into form. Despite this, the team was not expected to threaten the defending intercollegiate champions, Harvard. Sure enough, the Crimson controlled the game from start to finish, handing the Engineers a rather embarrassing 0–9 defeat. Tech had nearly another month before their next game and, though they had the winter break in between, coach Stewart tried to address some of the problems that had been pointed out in the loss. Unfortunately, the team came up against another of the nation's top squads and was handed a second drubbing, this time by Dartmouth.

Things continued to trend in the wrong direction in the third game. Yale was another of the teams vying for a championship and they proved their mettle with a 1–12 steamrolling of the Engineers. While the team felt the absence of Duplin in the match, its doubtful that a full-strength MIT would have fared much better against the Elis. With only terrible results on their resume, the team packed it in for the remainder of January and didn't have another game scheduled until after the exam break. Upon their return, Bill Cullinan, who had been on last year's squad, returned to school and was eligible to play once more.

Unfortunately for the team, the weather began to warm towards the beginning of February and caused the team to cancel their next four games. The team could only practice and wait for better conditions but, in the end, they were only able to play one more game on the year. In mid March the team took a trip south to play Brown. Taking advantage of their weak opponent, MIT was finally able to get its first win of the year. Crosby, Donahue and White each scored in the game to send the seniors off in style.

Paul Donahue served as team manager with.

== Roster ==
No.	Nat.	Player	Class	Pos	Height	Weight	DoB	Hometown	Previous team
		Walter F. Burke	Junior	G
	(United States)	Ralph H. Crosby (C)	Junior	C			1906-11-05	Somerville, Massachusetts
	(United States)	William E. Cullinan Jr.	Junior				1907-08-17	Cambridge, Massachusetts
	(United States)	Paul F. Donahue	Junior				1907-04-02	Roslindale, Massachusetts
	(United States)	Victor J. Duplin Jr.	Junior	LW			1904-12-03	Stoneham, Massachusetts
	(United States)	John J. Fahey	Senior	RW			1906-08-14	Derby, Connecticut
	(United States)	Laurence A. Horan	Junior				1905-07-01	Boston, Massachusetts
		John F. Langmaid Jr.	Sophomore
	(United States)	Daniel V. Lucey	Sophomore	D			1907-07-23	Melrose, Massachusetts
	(Canada)	Walter J. Nock	Senior	LW/D			1906-10-13	Mexico City, Mexico
	(Canada)	David D. Peene	Junior	RW			1903-01-20	Hamilton, Ontario
	(United States)	Philip J. Riley	Sophomore	G			1906-01-08	Lawrence, Massachusetts
	(United States)	George E. White	Junior	D			1906-11-13	Quincy, Massachusetts

== Standings ==
1927–28 Eastern Collegiate ice hockey standings
	Intercollegiate							Overall					
	GP	W	L	T	Pct.	GF	GA	GP	W	L	T	GF	GA
Amherst	7	4	2	1	.643	12	7	7	4	2	1	12	7
Army	8	1	7	0	.125	6	36	9	1	8	0	9	44
Bates	10	5	5	0	.500	21	26	12	6	5	1	26	28
Boston College	6	2	3	1	.417	18	23	7	2	4	1	19	25
Boston University	9	6	2	1	.722	42	23	9	6	2	1	42	23
Bowdoin	8	3	5	0	.375	16	27	9	4	5	0	20	28
Brown	–	–	–	–	–	–	–	12	4	8	0	–	–
Clarkson	10	9	1	0	.900	59	13	11	10	1	0	61	14
Colby	5	2	3	0	.400	10	16	7	3	3	1	20	19
Colgate	4	0	4	0	.000	4	18	4	0	4	0	4	18
Cornell	5	2	3	0	.400	11	29	5	2	3	0	11	29
Dartmouth	–	–	–	–	–	–	–	10	6	4	0	64	23
Hamilton	–	–	–	–	–	–	–	8	5	2	1	–	–
Harvard	5	4	1	0	.800	26	8	9	7	2	0	45	13
Holy Cross	–	–	–	–	–	–	–	–	–	–	–	–	–
Massachusetts Agricultural	6	0	6	0	.000	5	17	6	0	6	0	5	17
Middlebury	7	6	1	0	.857	27	10	8	7	1	0	36	11
MIT	5	1	3	1	.300	7	36	5	1	3	1	7	36
New Hampshire	8	6	1	1	.813	27	25	8	6	1	1	27	25
Norwich	–	–	–	–	–	–	–	4	0	2	2	–	–
Princeton	–	–	–	–	–	–	–	12	5	7	0	–	–
Rensselaer	–	–	–	–	–	–	–	4	2	1	1	–	–
St. Lawrence	–	–	–	–	–	–	–	4	2	2	0	–	–
Syracuse	–	–	–	–	–	–	–	–	–	–	–	–	–
Union	5	0	4	1	.100	10	21	5	0	4	1	10	21
Williams	8	6	2	0	.750	27	12	8	6	2	0	27	12
Yale	13	11	2	0	.846	88	22	18	14	4	0	114	39
YMCA College	6	2	4	0	.333	10	15	6	2	4	0	10	15

== Schedule and results ==
Date	Opponent	Site	Result	Record
Regular Season
December 9	vs. Harvard*	Boston Arena • Boston, Massachusetts	L 0–9	0–1–0
January 3	vs. Dartmouth*	Eastern States Coliseum • Springfield, Massachusetts	L 1–11	0–2–0
January 7	at Yale*	New Haven Arena • New Haven, Connecticut	L 1–12	0–3–0
February 22	at New Hampshire*	UNH Ice Rink • Durham, New Hampshire (Exhibition)	L 1–6 ^{†}	
February 22	at New Hampshire*	UNH Ice Rink • Durham, New Hampshire	T 1–1 ^{OT}	0–3–1
March 17	at Brown*	Rhode Island Auditorium • Providence, Rhode Island	W 4–3	1–3–1
*Non-conference game.

† The game took place in the morning with no mention of its occurrence by MIT. Its likely that it was used as a practice game as neither team had been able to get onto the ice for a long time prior to the 22nd.
