= 1927–28 Bowdoin Polar Bears men's ice hockey season =

Men's ice hockey

- Conference: Independent
- Home ice: Delta Rink

Record
- Overall: 4–5–0
- Home: 2–3–0
- Road: 2–2–0

Coaches and captains
- Head coach: Ben Houser
- Captain: Dick Thayer

The 1927–28 Bowdoin Polar Bears men's ice hockey season was the 9th season of play for the program.

== Season ==
Just after Thanksgiving, the team met for the first time. Coach Houser had a sizable contingent of men trying out for the team led by captain Dick Thayer. While the rink was being rebuilt, the team played 'Houserball' to get in shape. New equipment for 12 men was ordered and set a goal for the 46 candidates. In addition to Houserball, coach Houser had the boys playing 'tag hockey'. Because ice was not yet available, the prospective players broke up into groups of six and arranged themselves on a field in the same formation that they would on the ice. A football was used in lieu of a puck to demonstrate the passing, movements and arrangement of players that they should understand once the Bears got onto the ice. While the team was training, the school also set about addressing an issue with the rink. Floodlight had been used in the past few years for night games, however, this caused glare to reflect off of the surface and into the players' eyes. To alleviate this problem, additional lighting was place over the rink. Due to the increasing popularity of the sport, the student council called for a referendum from the student body to vote on whether ice hockey would be made a major sport. Bates and Colby, the two in-state rivals for Bowdoin, had already adopted ice hockey as a major sport and there was an urgency from some quarters for the Polar Bears not to fall behind. After returning home from the winter break, the vote was overwhelmingly in favor of hockey being a major sport. By a count of 282 in favor and 32 against, the program was promoted to major status, joining the football, baseball and track programs. With the huge support it was hoped that the effort to secure an indoor rink would soon be adopted by the school but those plays were only in their planning stages.

While receiving the good news, the team had been getting themselves arranged and were set for a busy opening week. A lack of ice time showed in their opening game of the season when they travelled down to Boston to take on Boston University. The Terriers got off to a quick start and score twice in the first three minutes. Dick and his younger brother Bob were the best Bowdoin could offer in the match, with Bob scoring twice, but they could never catch BU. The two succeeding games had to be postponed due to a lack of ice but the weather cooled down enough over the weekend to allow the first match with Bates to be held. Bowdoin was still hampered by a lack of teamwork and were unable to penetrate the Bobcat defense for large stretches of the game. They picked up the pace in the middle frame, managing to get 14 shots on goal, but the puck refused to enter the Garnet cage. Bates was able to score once in each period while the Polar Bears' only marker from Rice came with just 2 minutes left in the match.

Bowdoin hit the road for the next game and faced one of the best teams in the nation. Despite their lack of practice time, Yale took no pity on Bowdoin and hammered the Bears 0–8. Bowdoin returned home for their final match of the first half and played a much closer contest with New Hampshire. The two were tied for much of the game but the WIldcats were able to pull out a victory on a late third period goal.

After ending the first half of their season without a win, Bowdoin needed a break to address their issues. After some hard work and fortunate ice time, the Polar Bears returned triumphantly by sandwiching a pair of wins over Colby around a second loss to Boston University. In their first game back, the lineup was altered, moving Rice and Bob Thayer to wing while allowing Stone and Rice to take over on defense. A strong third period saw Bowdoin score three goals to take a commanding lead that they would ride to their first win of the year. Bowdoin then played Acadia, their first game against a Canadian college, and doubled their win total. They weren't able to keep the winning streak alive as BU arrived in town to repeat the earlier match the following night. A few days after losing the rematch with BU, Bowdoin got off to a poor start against the Mules by allowing two goals in the first 6 minutes. Howland buckled down afterwards and refused to allow any more to Colby. His superlative goaltending enabled the Bears to tie the match before the period was out and then take a lead with two goals less than 5 minutes into the second. With a 2-goal lead, Bowdoin played a defensive game for the rest of the match and were content to lob the puck down into the Mules' end. The second win gave Bowdoin a shot at the state championship.

Because Colby had twice defeated Bates previously, Bowdoin was sitting atop the standings and a win over the Garnet would give the title outright. Because a match with MIT was cancelled due to warm weather next game ended up being against Bates for the title. The two teams ended up in a goaltending battle with Howland matching the Bobcat netminder, Violette, save for save. Near the end of the second, reserve player Parker got the puck out of a scrimmage in front of the Garnet cage and lifted it into the top corner of the net. It was Parker's only goal of the season and it turned into the biggest score for the Polar Bears as it won them the title.

== Roster ==
No.	Nat.	Player	Class	Pos	Height	Weight	DoB	Hometown	Previous team
	(United States)	Gordon W. Bryant	Senior	C/RW			1906-03-08	Boston, Massachusetts
	(United States)	Basil S. Dwyer	Freshman	C/LW			1910-04-08	Hebron, Maine
	(United States)	Winslow R. Howland	Junior	G			1906-07-17	Framingham, Massachusetts
	(United States)	James M. Parker	Sophomore	D/RW			1908-03-31	Portland, Maine
	(United States)	Edward W. Rayner	Sophomore	C/LW			1907-05-21	Newton, Massachusetts
	(United States)	Parker H. Rice	Junior	D/LW			1906-11-03	Cambridge, Massachusetts
	(United States)	Clark S. Sears	Senior	LW			1906-10-15	Danvers, Massachusetts
	(United States)	Stuart R. Stone	Sophomore	D			1906-08-27	Newton, Massachusetts
	(United States)	Harry B. Thayer Jr.	Sophomore	D/RW			1907-11-08	Boston, Massachusetts
	(United States)	Richard S. Thayer (C)	Senior	C			1905-10-31	Stoneham, Massachusetts
	(United States)	Paul Tiemer	Senior	LW/RW			1905-06-11	Orange, New Jersey
	(United States)	William L. Walsh	Senior	D/C			1905-02-24	Lewiston, Maine

== Standings ==
1927–28 Eastern Collegiate ice hockey standings
	Intercollegiate							Overall					
	GP	W	L	T	Pct.	GF	GA	GP	W	L	T	GF	GA
Amherst	7	4	2	1	.643	12	7	7	4	2	1	12	7
Army	8	1	7	0	.125	6	36	9	1	8	0	9	44
Bates	10	5	5	0	.500	21	26	12	6	5	1	26	28
Boston College	6	2	3	1	.417	18	23	7	2	4	1	19	25
Boston University	9	6	2	1	.722	42	23	9	6	2	1	42	23
Bowdoin	8	3	5	0	.375	16	27	9	4	5	0	20	28
Brown	–	–	–	–	–	–	–	12	4	8	0	–	–
Clarkson	10	9	1	0	.900	59	13	11	10	1	0	61	14
Colby	5	2	3	0	.400	10	16	7	3	3	1	20	19
Colgate	4	0	4	0	.000	4	18	4	0	4	0	4	18
Cornell	5	2	3	0	.400	11	29	5	2	3	0	11	29
Dartmouth	–	–	–	–	–	–	–	10	6	4	0	64	23
Hamilton	–	–	–	–	–	–	–	8	5	2	1	–	–
Harvard	6	5	1	0	.833	28	8	9	7	2	0	45	13
Holy Cross	–	–	–	–	–	–	–	–	–	–	–	–	–
Massachusetts Agricultural	6	0	6	0	.000	5	17	6	0	6	0	5	17
Middlebury	7	6	1	0	.857	27	10	8	7	1	0	36	11
MIT	5	1	3	1	.300	7	36	5	1	3	1	7	36
New Hampshire	8	6	1	1	.813	27	25	8	6	1	1	27	25
Norwich	–	–	–	–	–	–	–	4	0	2	2	–	–
Princeton	–	–	–	–	–	–	–	12	5	7	0	–	–
Rensselaer	–	–	–	–	–	–	–	4	2	1	1	–	–
St. Lawrence	–	–	–	–	–	–	–	4	2	2	0	–	–
Syracuse	–	–	–	–	–	–	–	–	–	–	–	–	–
Union	5	0	4	1	.100	10	21	5	0	4	1	10	21
Williams	8	6	2	0	.750	27	12	8	6	2	0	27	12
Yale	13	11	2	0	.846	88	22	18	14	4	0	114	39
YMCA College	6	2	4	0	.333	10	15	6	2	4	0	10	15

== Schedule and results ==
Date	Opponent	Site	Result	Record
Regular Season
January 12	at Boston University*	Boston Arena • Boston, Massachusetts	L 2–5	0–1–0
January 16	Bates*	Delta Rink • Brunswick, Maine	L 1–3	0–2–0
January 18	at Yale*	New Haven Arena • New Haven, Connecticut	L 0–8	0–3–0
January 21	New Hampshire*	Delta Rink • Brunswick, Maine	L 1–2	0–4–0
February 7	at Colby*	Colby Rink • Waterville, Maine	W 5–2	1–4–0
February 10	Acadia*	Delta Rink • Brunswick, Maine	W 4–1	2–4–0
February 11	Boston University*	Delta Rink • Brunswick, Maine	L 2–5	2–5–0
February 13	Colby*	Delta Rink • Brunswick, Maine	W 4–2	3–5–0
February 21	at Bates*	Bartlett Street Rink • Lewiston, Maine	W 1–0	4–5–0
*Non-conference game.

† Bates and Colby records indicate the first games with both as being exhibition matches. Bowdoin reported the Colby match as being an official game but did not mention the status of the Bates game.
