= 1927–28 Amherst Lord Jeffs men's ice hockey season =

- Conference: Independent
- Home ice: Pratt Field

Record
- Overall: 4–2–1
- Home: 1–1–0
- Road: 3–1–1

Coaches and captains
- Head coach: Henry F. White
- Captain: Malcolm Cameron

The 1927–28 Amherst Lord Jeffs men's ice hockey season was the 15th season of play for the program. The Lord Jeffs were coached by Henry White in his 2nd season.

== Season ==
Thanks to some accommodation from the weather, Amherst was able to open its season in mid-January against Middlebury. With all three starter on the back end returning, the Lord Jeffs' defense was again stout, holding the Panthers to just a single goal in regulation. Unfortunately, the offense was still a one-man show with team captain Malcolm Cameron carrying the load. Overtime was needed to settle the score and it was the visitors who secured the final tally. Over the next several days, the ice got progressively worse and was completely unusable by the time Williams arrived. The teams were forced to play their match on Massachusetts Agricultural's surface, which was only marginally better. Soft, watery ice slowed the game to a crawl and only one goal was scored. Late in the third, Cameron made a long pass to Nichols near center ice. Nichols then fired a high-arcing shot towards the Ephs' cage where it hit an opposing defender in the hip and bounced into the net.

Amherst took a short jaunt to New York and earned a tie with Hamilton in the middle of the month. After returning, the team's offense was finally able to get on track against the Aggies. Cameron recorded three points in the game (2 goals, 1 assist) and led the team to its best offensive output in over three years. The scored was muted once more in the following game with YMCA College but the team was saved by the prowess of Parnall and Perry on the blueline. Once overtime began, Amherst went on the attack and continued to pressure the Maroons' cage for the rest of the game. Cameron scored twice in the second overtime to polish off the visitors.

The team's second trip to New York showed that Amherst was not the only club hit hard by poor weather as Army had been forced to use the rink at Bear Mountain for the entire season. The Jeffmen took no pity on the Cadets, putting up another strong defensive performance and winning 2–1. With only a rematch with Williams remaining, Amherst had a chance to post the best season in program history. Both teams played a sloppy, disjoined brand of hockey with neither seeming to have any sort of chemistry on offense. Even on the few occasions where they were able to get shots on goal, most chances missed the net and only a single goal was recorded. Unfortunately, that came in the form of an Ephs' tally in the third period, ending Amherst's season in disappointing fashion.

Martial D. Maling served as team manager with Chauncey S. Kibbe as his assistant.

== Roster ==
No.	Nat.	Player	Class	Pos	Height	Weight	DoB	Hometown	Previous team
	(United States)	Eldridge T. Burnett	Senior				1904-05-03	Amherst, Massachusetts
	(United States)	Malcolm K. Cameron (C)	Senior	C			1905-12-30	Greenfield, Massachusetts
	(United States)	Charles R. Currier Jr.	Senior	G			1907-02-19	Jamaica Plain, Massachusetts
	(United States)	Geoffrey G. Felt	Junior	D/W			1907-02-12	Melrose, Massachusetts
	(United States)	Robert S. Hanford	Senior	C/LW/RW				Rochester, New York
	(United States)	Willard M. Kellogg	Sophomore				1907-11-20	West Hartford, Connecticut
	(United States)	William McCune Jr.	Senior	C/RW			1905-10-06	Pittsburgh, Pennsylvania
	(United States)	Albert J. Nichols	Sophomore	RW				West Hartford, Connecticut
	(United States)	Christopher G. Parnall Jr.	Junior	D			1909-09-21	Rochester, New York
	(United States)	Rowland V. Patrick	Junior	LW				West Newton, Massachusetts
	(United States)	Hubert L. Perry	Sophomore	D			1908-05-20	Buffalo, New York
	(United States)	Robert H. Waterman	Sophomore					Providence, Rhode Island

== Standings ==
1927–28 Eastern Collegiate ice hockey standings
	Intercollegiate							Overall					
	GP	W	L	T	Pct.	GF	GA	GP	W	L	T	GF	GA
Amherst	7	4	2	1	.643	12	7	7	4	2	1	12	7
Army	8	1	7	0	.125	6	36	9	1	8	0	9	44
Bates	10	5	5	0	.500	21	26	12	6	5	1	26	28
Boston College	6	2	3	1	.417	18	23	7	2	4	1	19	25
Boston University	9	6	2	1	.722	42	23	9	6	2	1	42	23
Bowdoin	8	3	5	0	.375	16	27	9	4	5	0	20	28
Brown	–	–	–	–	–	–	–	12	4	8	0	–	–
Clarkson	10	9	1	0	.900	59	13	11	10	1	0	61	14
Colby	5	2	3	0	.400	10	16	7	3	3	1	20	19
Colgate	4	0	4	0	.000	4	18	4	0	4	0	4	18
Cornell	5	2	3	0	.400	11	29	5	2	3	0	11	29
Dartmouth	–	–	–	–	–	–	–	10	6	4	0	64	23
Hamilton	–	–	–	–	–	–	–	8	5	2	1	–	–
Harvard	5	4	1	0	.800	26	8	9	7	2	0	45	13
Holy Cross	–	–	–	–	–	–	–	–	–	–	–	–	–
Massachusetts Agricultural	6	0	6	0	.000	5	17	6	0	6	0	5	17
Middlebury	7	6	1	0	.857	27	10	8	7	1	0	36	11
MIT	5	1	3	1	.300	7	36	5	1	3	1	7	36
New Hampshire	8	6	1	1	.813	27	25	8	6	1	1	27	25
Norwich	–	–	–	–	–	–	–	4	0	2	2	–	–
Princeton	–	–	–	–	–	–	–	12	5	7	0	–	–
Rensselaer	–	–	–	–	–	–	–	4	2	1	1	–	–
St. Lawrence	–	–	–	–	–	–	–	4	2	2	0	–	–
Syracuse	–	–	–	–	–	–	–	–	–	–	–	–	–
Union	5	0	4	1	.100	10	21	5	0	4	1	10	21
Williams	8	6	2	0	.750	27	12	8	6	2	0	27	12
Yale	13	11	2	0	.846	88	22	18	14	4	0	114	39
YMCA College	6	2	4	0	.333	10	15	6	2	4	0	10	15

== Schedule and results ==
Date	Opponent	Site	Result	Record
Regular Season
January 13	Middlebury*	Pratt Field Rink • Amherst, Massachusetts	L 1–2 ^{2OT}	0–1–0
January 18	vs. Williams*	Alumni Field Rink • Amherst, Massachusetts	W 1–0	1–1–0
January 28	at Hamilton*	Russell Sage Rink • Clinton, New York	T 1–1 ^{2OT}	1–1–1
January 29	at Massachusetts Agricultural*	Alumni Field Rink • Amherst, Massachusetts	W 4–1	2–1–1
February 4	YMCA College*	Pratt Field Rink • Amherst, Massachusetts	W 3–1 ^{2OT}	3–1–1
February 11	at Army*	Bear Mountain Rink • Bear Mountain, New York	W 2–1 ^{2OT}	4–1–1
February 21	at Williams*	Sage Hall Rink • Williamstown, Massachusetts	L 0–1	4–2–1
*Non-conference game.
