= 1927–28 Colgate men's ice hockey season =

- Conference: Independent
- Home ice: Freshman Football Rink

Record
- Overall: 0–4–0
- Home: 0–1–0
- Road: 0–3–0

Coaches and captains
- Head coach: James Ballantine
- Assistant coaches: J. Howard Starr
- Captain: Albert Chambers

The 1927–28 Colgate men's ice hockey season was the 5th season of play for the program. The team was coached by James Ballantine in his 3rd season.

== Season ==
After a hiatus of 5 years, the Colgate athletic council voted to bring the ice hockey program back as a minor sport. Lt Col James Ballantine, who had been the head coach in the early 20s, agreed to helm the club once more while J. Howard Starr, a former player at YMCA College, would serve as his assistant. About $400 was made available to the team with three quarters of that going to game-related expenses and the remaining fourth reserved for equipment costs.

The team began practicing in the Huntington Gymnasium while a temporary rink was built atop the freshman football field. The Maroons did what they could to get ready for their first game, however, the weather was not accommodating and forced the team to cancel or postpone several games in January. The lack of ice also forced the team to take their practices on Taylor Lake as some of the wrinkles with the new rink were being ironed out.

Because most of the early games were supposed to take place at home, the hockey team could only sit and wait for the weather to turn. However, in the end, the Maroons wouldn't play their first match until the beginning of February when they travelled to the north country. The opening match with St. Lawrence started badly for Colgate as the team surrendered two goals within the first few minutes. The Maroons settled down after that and slowly crawled back into the game. After tying the score in the second, Colgate found itself down by a goal heading into the third period. Just when it looked like overtime was a sure thing, the Larries scored to take their final lead of the game. The next evening the team was a short distance away facing down a very powerful Clarkson squad. The Maroons fought valiantly but they were clearly overmatched by the Golden Knights. Despite the disparity in play, Colgate only allowed 4 goals in the match which was a decent result for the inexperienced team.

Due several more cancellations, Colgate did not play another game until the end of the month. Miraculously, the team's rink was usable for the rematch with Clarkson. Unfortunately, the time off had not been kind to the Maroons. Colgate's defense was no match for the stunning Clarkson offense. Chambers was under attack from the Knights all game and made several impressive saves but wasn't able to stop the puck from entering the cage nine times. A few days later a postponed match with Cornell was finally played and the Maroons gave everything they had to the Big Red. The defense was far better than it had been against Clarkson and held Cornell to just a single score in the middle frame. The offense generated several chances, however, nothing was able to find the back of the net and Colgate ended the season without a victory.

Charles Fistere served as team manager with Paul Wish as his assistant.

Note: Colgate's athletic teams did not have a moniker until 'Red Raiders' was adopted in 1932.

== Roster ==
No.	Nat.	Player	Class	Pos	Height	Weight	DoB	Hometown	Previous team
	(United States)	Clifton W. Anderson	Sophomore					Greenwich, Connecticut
	(United States)	Robert E. Bailey	Senior					Nanuet, New York
	(United States)	Warren F. Barnes	Sophomore					Winchester, Massachusetts
	(United States)	Robert A. Blakeslee	Junior					Springfield, Massachusetts
	(United States)	George E. Brewer	Senior				1907-02-26	Spring Valley, New York
	(United States)	Albert M. Chambers	Junior					Kew Gardens, New York
	(United States)	Robert F. Hofheins	Freshman					Buffalo, New York
	(United States)	Francis W. Howe	Sophomore					Buffalo, New York
	(United States)	James A. Nelson	Freshman					Sea Cliff, New York
	(United States)	John M. Spelder	Junior					Buffalo, New York
	(United States)	Donald M. Terry	Freshman					Albany, New York
	(United States)	James B. Visel	Freshman				1907-12-07	New Haven, Connecticut

== Standings ==
1927–28 Eastern Collegiate ice hockey standings
	Intercollegiate							Overall					
	GP	W	L	T	Pct.	GF	GA	GP	W	L	T	GF	GA
Amherst	7	4	2	1	.643	12	7	7	4	2	1	12	7
Army	8	1	7	0	.125	6	36	9	1	8	0	9	44
Bates	10	5	5	0	.500	21	26	12	6	5	1	26	28
Boston College	6	2	3	1	.417	18	23	7	2	4	1	19	25
Boston University	9	6	2	1	.722	42	23	9	6	2	1	42	23
Bowdoin	8	3	5	0	.375	16	27	9	4	5	0	20	28
Brown	–	–	–	–	–	–	–	12	4	8	0	–	–
Clarkson	10	9	1	0	.900	59	13	11	10	1	0	61	14
Colby	5	2	3	0	.400	10	16	7	3	3	1	20	19
Colgate	4	0	4	0	.000	4	18	4	0	4	0	4	18
Cornell	5	2	3	0	.400	11	29	5	2	3	0	11	29
Dartmouth	–	–	–	–	–	–	–	10	6	4	0	64	23
Hamilton	–	–	–	–	–	–	–	8	5	2	1	–	–
Harvard	6	5	1	0	.833	28	8	9	7	2	0	45	13
Holy Cross	–	–	–	–	–	–	–	–	–	–	–	–	–
Massachusetts Agricultural	6	0	6	0	.000	5	17	6	0	6	0	5	17
Middlebury	7	6	1	0	.857	27	10	8	7	1	0	36	11
MIT	5	1	3	1	.300	7	36	5	1	3	1	7	36
New Hampshire	8	6	1	1	.813	27	25	8	6	1	1	27	25
Norwich	–	–	–	–	–	–	–	4	0	2	2	–	–
Princeton	–	–	–	–	–	–	–	12	5	7	0	–	–
Rensselaer	–	–	–	–	–	–	–	4	2	1	1	–	–
St. Lawrence	–	–	–	–	–	–	–	4	2	2	0	–	–
Syracuse	–	–	–	–	–	–	–	–	–	–	–	–	–
Union	5	0	4	1	.100	10	21	5	0	4	1	10	21
Williams	8	6	2	0	.750	27	12	8	6	2	0	27	12
Yale	13	11	2	0	.846	88	22	18	14	4	0	114	39
YMCA College	6	2	4	0	.333	10	15	6	2	4	0	10	15

== Schedule and results ==
Date	Opponent	Site	Result	Record
Regular Season
February 3	at St. Lawrence*	Weeks Field Rink • Canton, New York	L 3–4	0–1–0
February 4	at Clarkson*	Ives Park • Potsdam, New York	L 0–4	0–2–0
February 24	Clarkson*	Freshman Football Rink • Hamilton, New York	L 1–9	0–3–0
February 27	at Cornell*	Beebe Lake • Ithaca, New York	L 0–1	0–4–0
*Non-conference game.

== Scoring statistics ==
Name	Position	Games	Goals
Robert Hofheins	D/LW	4	1
Francis Howe	C	4	1
James Nelson	RW	4	1
James Visel	C/LW	4	1
Clifton Anderson	LW	1	0
Robert Bailey	RW	1	0
George Brewer	D	1	0
Robert Blakeslee	D	2	0
John Spelder	D	2	0
Donald Terry	D	2	0
Warren Barnes	D	3	0
Albert Chambers	G	4	0
Total			4

Note: Assists were not recorded as a statistic.
