= 1927–28 Colby Mules men's ice hockey season =

- Conference: Independent
- Home ice: Colby Rink

Record
- Overall: 3–3–1
- Home: 2–2–1
- Road: 1–1–0

Coaches and captains
- Head coach: Eddie Roundy
- Assistant coaches: Bill Millett
- Captain: Dick Drummond

The 1927–28 Colby Mules men's ice hockey season was the 7th season of play for the program. The Mules represented Colby College and were coached by Eddie Roundy in his 4th season.

== Season ==
After posting the best season the program had seen, Colby's ice hockey team hoped that they had finally turned the corner. The school brought back one of the original members, Bill Millett, to serve as an assistant for the baseball team and he also volunteered to help out with the hockey club. However, despite the high hopes, the team saw most of their experienced players not report at the start of the season. Other than the three players who graduated, Carlson fell ill in December and was recuperating at home while Scott and Tattersall decided not to join the team this season. However, Team captain Dick Drummond, with help from the rest of the students, was able to convince both Scott and most of the former players return to the team. By mid January, Carlson had gotten well enough to return to campus and was in the lineup for the first game.

The team began the season against Bates, looking for a repeat performance in their season finale. The Bobcats, who already had 4 games under their belts, got off to a fast start but Fat West stopped every shot that was sent at the cage. When the Garnet attack ebbed, Scott and Drummond raced up the ice with the former netting the first goal of the game. West was called upon several times to save the day as the Mules received 7 infractions in the game. However, even with having to kill so many penalties, Colby looked to be the better of the two teams. Bates did eventually tie the game in the third but the Blue and Grey kept the ice tilted in their favor when overtime began. It was only through a spectacular display of goaltending by the Garnet netminder that the game went through four overtime periods. However, after more than an hour of game time, Eddie Sturhahn found himself on a breakaway and poked the puck past an exhausted netminder for the winning goal. The Mules were riding high after the win but a week later New Hampshire arrived and gave the team a bloody nose. After the Wildcats opened the scoring early in the first but inflicted a deeper wound at the beginning of the second. Bob Scott was clubbed in the head by a UNH player hard enough to open a gash over his eye. While the offending Wildcat received a penalty, Scott was knocked out for the rest of the game. To make matters worse, New Hampshire scored soon thereafter and added two more at the start of the third. The Mules weren't able to find any offense until the final 5 minutes of the game but by then it was too late to prevent the loss.

After the humbling they received, the team was put through their pace going into a match with the Brunswick Cabots, a nearby amateur club. The Mules took no mercy on the visitors, producing the biggest win in program history. With Scott still ailing, Tattersall assumed a starting role and scored his first collegiate goal. Sturhahn led the team with a hat-trick while Drummond, Thiel and Pommerleau all chipped in for the 8–1 victory. Two days later, the team hosted the return match with Bates and had a nearly identical result. The Bobcats opened the scoring 38 seconds into the game but were unable to beat West for the remainder of the match. In the second, Scott, who was now well enough to play, evened the count but that was the only marker Colby could generate in regulation. With overtime once again needed to settle the match, both teams played long into the night. After the first two extra sessions went scoreless, a second pair of 5-minute periods was agreed upon. Drummond found Sturhahn for the go-ahead-goal just 32 seconds into the third overtime and forced West and the defense to weather a barrage of shots for the next nine and a half minutes. They managed to hold off the fatigued Garnet for the rest of the game to capture the season series.

After pausing for exam week, the team resumed play with a match against Bowdoin. Unfortunately, the time off looked to have sapped the team's strength and the home team bared little resemblance to the one that had twice vanquished Bates. The top line of Sturhahn, Scott and Drummond acted like they had never seem one another before and showed a total lack of teamwork in the match. West and the defense did what they could but the Mules found it impossible to completely stem the tide of the Polar Bears' offense. One of the few bright spots in the game was the play of Dan Scanlon, who joined from the freshman team. He scored the first of Colby's two goals on the night before the team collapsed under the weight of the Bowdoin barrage. Two days later, the team played host to Acadia who were visiting from Nova Scotia. Coach Roundy tried a new look with the lineup, moving Scanlon to starting wing and Sturhahn to center. Drummond dropped back to defense while Irvine took over in goal. The team looked much more settled in the game and they were able to give a better display of teamwork. Sturhahn opened the scoring and Pomerleau nearly joined shortly afterwards, however, the referee had blown his whistle just before the puck entered the cage and the goal was disallowed. Tattersall's marker a few minutes later was counted and gave the team a 2-goal lead. Before the first period ended, snow began to fall on the ice. By the start of the second it was coming down so heavily that the play was affected. The visitors appeared to be better suited to the conditions and caged two quick goals to even the count. As the snow continued, the puck began to get lost in drifts and the game slowed to a crawl. Passing became impossible as did stickhandling after a fashion. With the team reduced to attempting long-range shots, the game was all but over. Both sides agreed that overtime was pointless with the weather conditions and the match ended in a draw.

The next week, with the state championship on the line, a few tweaks were made to the lineup. Scott dropped back to defense, alternating with Thiel, Drummond and Carlson throughout the match. In his place, Lovett and Tattersall filled in a left wing. The moves seemed to work early when Sturhahn opened with a brilliant exhibition and caged two goals after solo runs up the ice. However, the rest of the team looked out of sorts and before the end of the period the score was tied. The Bears added two more in the second and Colby had no answer. The Mules saw their chance at an outright championship slip through their fingers and, a week later, their chance at a shared title were ended when Bowdoin defeated Bates.

J. Lewis Lovett served as team manager.

== Roster ==
No.	Nat.	Player	Class	Pos	Height	Weight	DoB	Hometown	Previous team
	(United States)	J. Sten Carlson	Junior	D				Norwood, Massachusetts
	(United States)	E. Richard Drummond II (C)	Senior	D/F			1907-09-14	Waterville, Maine
	(United States)	Rupert M. Irvine	Junior	G			1907-06-08	Caribou, Maine
	(United States)	J. Lewis Lovett	Senior	G				Hudson, Massachusetts
	(United States)	Rudolph J. F. Pomerleau	Junior	RW			1907-08-22	Waterville, Maine
	(United States)	Daniel F. Scanlon	Freshman					Malden, Massachusetts
	(United States)	Robert W. Scott	Junior	D/F				Wilton, Maine
	(United States)	Edward M. Sturhahn	Sophomore	D/F			1906-05-08	New Rochelle, New York
	(United States)	Henry E. Tattersall	Junior	C/LW/RW			1906-05-30	New Bedford, Massachusetts
	(United States)	Albert J. Thiel	Senior	D			1904-02-03	Canton, Massachusetts
	(United States)	George C. West	Senior	G			1907-09-04	Waterville, Maine

== Standings ==
1927–28 Eastern Collegiate ice hockey standings
	Intercollegiate							Overall					
	GP	W	L	T	Pct.	GF	GA	GP	W	L	T	GF	GA
Amherst	7	4	2	1	.643	12	7	7	4	2	1	12	7
Army	8	1	7	0	.125	6	36	9	1	8	0	9	44
Bates	10	5	5	0	.500	21	26	12	6	5	1	26	28
Boston College	6	2	3	1	.417	18	23	7	2	4	1	19	25
Boston University	9	6	2	1	.722	42	23	9	6	2	1	42	23
Bowdoin	8	3	5	0	.375	16	27	9	4	5	0	20	28
Brown	–	–	–	–	–	–	–	12	4	8	0	–	–
Clarkson	10	9	1	0	.900	59	13	11	10	1	0	61	14
Colby	5	2	3	0	.400	10	16	7	3	3	1	20	19
Colgate	4	0	4	0	.000	4	18	4	0	4	0	4	18
Cornell	5	2	3	0	.400	11	29	5	2	3	0	11	29
Dartmouth	–	–	–	–	–	–	–	10	6	4	0	64	23
Hamilton	–	–	–	–	–	–	–	8	5	2	1	–	–
Harvard	6	5	1	0	.833	28	8	9	7	2	0	45	13
Holy Cross	–	–	–	–	–	–	–	–	–	–	–	–	–
Massachusetts Agricultural	6	0	6	0	.000	5	17	6	0	6	0	5	17
Middlebury	7	6	1	0	.857	27	10	8	7	1	0	36	11
MIT	5	1	3	1	.300	7	36	5	1	3	1	7	36
New Hampshire	8	6	1	1	.813	27	25	8	6	1	1	27	25
Norwich	–	–	–	–	–	–	–	4	0	2	2	–	–
Princeton	–	–	–	–	–	–	–	12	5	7	0	–	–
Rensselaer	–	–	–	–	–	–	–	4	2	1	1	–	–
St. Lawrence	–	–	–	–	–	–	–	4	2	2	0	–	–
Syracuse	–	–	–	–	–	–	–	–	–	–	–	–	–
Union	5	0	4	1	.100	10	21	5	0	4	1	10	21
Williams	8	6	2	0	.750	27	12	8	6	2	0	27	12
Yale	13	11	2	0	.846	88	22	18	14	4	0	114	39
YMCA College	6	2	4	0	.333	10	15	6	2	4	0	10	15

== Schedule and results ==
Date	Opponent	Site	Result	Record
Regular Season
January 17	at Bates*	Bartlett Street Rink • Lewiston, Maine	W 2–1 ^{4OT}	1–0–0
January 19	New Hampshire*	Colby Rink • Waterville, Maine	L 2–5	1–1–0
January 24	Brunswick Cabots*	Colby Rink • Waterville, Maine	W 8–1	2–1–0
January 26	Bates*	Colby Rink • Waterville, Maine	W 2–1 ^{2OT}	3–1–0
February 7	Bowdoin*	Colby Rink • Waterville, Maine	L 2–5	3–2–0
February 9	Acadia*	Colby Rink • Waterville, Maine	T 2–2	3–2–1
February 13	at Bowdoin*	Delta Rink • Brunswick, Maine	L 2–4	3–3–1
*Non-conference game.

== Scoring statistics ==
Name	Position	Games	Goals	Assists	Points
Eddie Sturhahn	C/RW	7	9	0	9
Dick Drummond	D/C	7	2	3	5
Harry Tattersall	LW	6	4	0	4
Bob Scott	D/LW	6	2	0	2
Rudolph Pomerleau	LW	4	1	1	2
Dan Scanlon	RW	3	1	0	1
Al Thiel	D	7	1	0	1
Rupe Irvine	G	2	0	0	0
Lew Lovett	LW	3	0	0	0
Sten Carlson	D	7	0	0	0
Fat West	G	7	0	0	0
Total			20		

Note: Primary assists were reported infrequently.
