= 1927–28 Cornell Big Red men's ice hockey season =

Intercollegiate hockey season

- Home ice: Beebe Lake

Record
- Overall: 2–3–0
- Home: 2–2–0
- Road: 0–1–0

Coaches and captains
- Head coach: Nick Bawlf
- Captain: James Taylor

The 1927–28 Cornell Big Red men's ice hockey season was the 23rd season of play for the program. The teams was coached by Nick Bawlf in his 8th season.

== Season ==
A common but unwelcome occurrence, Cornell's season began late due to a lack of ice. The team didn't get on their skates until January and, as a result, the first home game wasn't scheduled until the 14th. Warm weather continued to plague the team through the first half of the month and eventually the first game against Syracuse had to be cancelled. The situation got so bad for the Big Red that they were forced to hold practices inside, without ice. All of the team's early misfortune resulted in a terrible game for Cornell to start the season. The Big Red lost a road game to Princeton 1–14, setting a program worst for the most goals allowed and the largest margin of defeat. The result could hardly be surprising as Princeton was playing on their home rink, and was competing in their eighth game of the season.

After the drubbing, Cornell returned home to find the weather still wasn't up to the take to freeze Beebe Lake. There were fears that their next game would have to be cancelled as well but the team was finally able to play at home on the 28th. The Big Red played much better than they had in the first match but their conditioning was still lacking and the team faded in the later half of the game. The following game took place two weeks later but the warm weather was still a problem. Initially the game was delayed and then cancelled but, owing to a small patch of ice on the northwest section of the lake, a temporary rink was built and the game took place on the 10th. The result was more indicative of Cornell's lack of practice than any superiority by Williams, but the Big Red lost their third game out of three matches. Team captain Taylor was forced to sit out the game due to taking a puck in the eye in one of the few practice sessions before the match.

Another game with Syracuse, which was to be held on February 18, ended up being nixed due to weather conditions. Union, owing to having the same rink arrangement as Cornell, was in much the same shape as the Ithacans. The result was a win for the Big Red in front of a very small crowd. The match was supposed to have been the team's final game of the season, however, the weather suddenly turned cold and the ice was good enough for one more game to be tacked onto the end of the season. The game was reported as being a 'post season' match, which it was in a literal sense as it took place after the team's schedule had concluded. Once again, Cornell faced a squad as equally impacted by weather conditions as they were and the Big Red came out on top. MacPherson scored the only goal of the game and Cornell was able to finish the season with a respectable record in spite of all their troubles.

== Roster ==
No.	Nat.	Player	Class	Pos	Height	Weight	DoB	Hometown	Previous team
	(United States)	Earl Clark	Junior	C				Utica, New York
	(United States)	Ernest Kingsbury	Junior	D				Ithaca, New York
	(United States)	Richard Llop	Sophomore	RW				Manhattan, New York
		Frederick Long	Sophomore	G
	(Canada)	Charles MacBeth		G				Ottawa, Ontario
	(Canada)	Lee MacPherson	Sophomore	RW				Marysville, New Brunswick
	(United States)	John Parker	Sophomore	D				Schenectady, New York
		Andrew G. Sharp	Senior	LW/RW
	(United States)	James Taylor (C)	Senior	D				Ithaca, New York
	(United States)	Donald Uffinger	Sophomore	LW				Summit, New Jersey
	(United States)	Carl Weagant	Junior	RW				Wilkinsburg, Pennsylvania

== Standings ==
1927–28 Eastern Collegiate ice hockey standings
	Intercollegiate							Overall					
	GP	W	L	T	Pct.	GF	GA	GP	W	L	T	GF	GA
Amherst	7	4	2	1	.643	12	7	7	4	2	1	12	7
Army	8	1	7	0	.125	6	36	9	1	8	0	9	44
Bates	10	5	5	0	.500	21	26	12	6	5	1	26	28
Boston College	6	2	3	1	.417	18	23	7	2	4	1	19	25
Boston University	9	6	2	1	.722	42	23	9	6	2	1	42	23
Bowdoin	8	3	5	0	.375	16	27	9	4	5	0	20	28
Brown	–	–	–	–	–	–	–	12	4	8	0	–	–
Clarkson	10	9	1	0	.900	59	13	11	10	1	0	61	14
Colby	5	2	3	0	.400	10	16	7	3	3	1	20	19
Colgate	4	0	4	0	.000	4	18	4	0	4	0	4	18
Cornell	5	2	3	0	.400	11	29	5	2	3	0	11	29
Dartmouth	–	–	–	–	–	–	–	10	6	4	0	64	23
Hamilton	–	–	–	–	–	–	–	8	5	2	1	–	–
Harvard	5	4	1	0	.800	26	8	9	7	2	0	45	13
Holy Cross	–	–	–	–	–	–	–	–	–	–	–	–	–
Massachusetts Agricultural	6	0	6	0	.000	5	17	6	0	6	0	5	17
Middlebury	7	6	1	0	.857	27	10	8	7	1	0	36	11
MIT	5	1	3	1	.300	7	36	5	1	3	1	7	36
New Hampshire	8	6	1	1	.813	27	25	8	6	1	1	27	25
Norwich	–	–	–	–	–	–	–	4	0	2	2	–	–
Princeton	–	–	–	–	–	–	–	12	5	7	0	–	–
Rensselaer	–	–	–	–	–	–	–	4	2	1	1	–	–
St. Lawrence	–	–	–	–	–	–	–	4	2	2	0	–	–
Syracuse	–	–	–	–	–	–	–	–	–	–	–	–	–
Union	5	0	4	1	.100	10	21	5	0	4	1	10	21
Williams	8	6	2	0	.750	27	12	8	6	2	0	27	12
Yale	13	11	2	0	.846	88	22	18	14	4	0	114	39
YMCA College	6	2	4	0	.333	10	15	6	2	4	0	10	15

== Schedule and results ==
Date	Opponent	Site	Result	Record
Regular season
January 21	at Princeton*	Hobey Baker Memorial Rink • Princeton, New Jersey	L 1–14	0–1–0
January 28	Clarkson*	Beebe Lake • Ithaca, New York	L 1–4	0–2–0
February 10	Williams*	Beebe Lake • Ithaca, New York	L 1–7	0–3–0
February 22	Union*	Beebe Lake • Ithaca, New York	W 7–4	1–3–0
February 27	Colgate*	Beebe Lake • Ithaca, New York	W 1–0	2–3–0
*Non-conference game.
