= 1927–28 Clarkson Golden Knights men's ice hockey season =

Intercollegiate hockey season

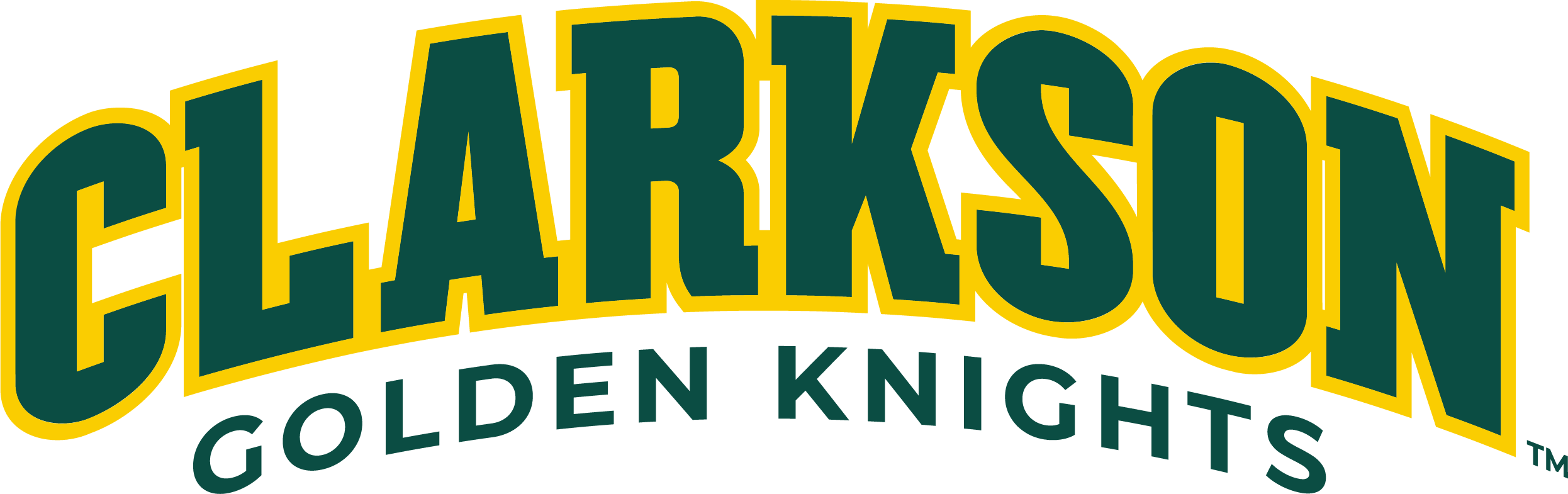
- Home ice: Ives Park

Record
- Overall: 10–1–0
- Home: 4–0–0
- Road: 6–1–0

Coaches and captains
- Head coach: Gordon Croskery
- Captain: Ray Wayland

The 1927–28 Clarkson Golden Knights men's ice hockey season was the 8th season of play for the program. The team was coached by Gordon Croskery in his 5th season.

== Season ==
After a successful season the year before, Clarkson saw a chance to prove their skill and scheduled several games against the upper echelon of college hockey. This time the team got an early start on their season and began practicing just after Thanksgiving. The full month gave professor Croskery the opportunity to get the new players up to speed, but it was the returning crop that would prove vital for the team's success.

Clarkson opened at home against Victoria College. Three consecutive days of warm weather left the ice in poor shape but the teams fought through the conditions. "Light Horse Harry" Heintzman opened the scoring in the first but Tech was unable to add to the score in regulation. Fortunately, their defense was as reliable as it had been the year before and the Knights took the game into overtime. Near the end of the 10-minute session, MacCartney netted the winning goal and sent the Green and Gold faithful home happy. The team headed down to West Point for the second game and the result was much the same; Clarkson scored early and then relied on the twin towers of Wayland and MacCartney on the back end to shut down the opposing offense. It was only a strong game from the Army netminder, Browning, that prevented the score from being lopsided.

The third game of the season was the first big test for the program, as they met one of the 'Big Four' in Princeton. While the Tigers hadn't been champions in over a decade, the team was still formidable and got out to an early lead. Down 2–4 after 20 minutes, Clarkson bore down in the third and closed off Princeton's avenue of attack. On the offensive side, Fred Dion became an instant star; he scored twice in the first, three times in the second and then, after Princeton had ties the game early in the third, netted the final three goals to set a program record with 8 markers in the match. Tech kept rolling for the remainder of the month. They won their next four games, all against college teams, by a combined score of 21–1 with Dion earning two more hat-tricks.

When the team played host to Syracuse in early February, Clarkson ran their winning streak to 17 games and did so in style. Tech dominated the visitors through the entire game and set new program records for both goals scored (14) and margin of victory (+13). The game was so one-sided that Burke, who was starting at Left Wing in place of the absent Bill Guest, got enough ice time to score 5 goals. The winning streak came to an end the following week when Middlebury broke through Tech's vaunted defense and two of Clarkson's goals were waved off by the referee.

Clarkson ended the year with a trip downstate and took their frustrations out on their opponents. Dion recorded his 5th hat-trick of the season against Colgate and the whole team turned in a masterful performance against Hamilton. The win marked Tech's first victory over the Continentals in five attempts and gave the Knights the (unofficial) New York state championship.

Dion's individual performance over the season, particularly in the game against Princeton, earn him a spot on the All-American team, the first Clarkson player so honored.

== Roster ==
No.	Nat.	Player	Class	Pos	Height	Weight	DoB	Hometown	Previous team
	(United States)	Charles Beneke	Sophomore	D				Liverpool, New York
	(Canada)	John Burke	Freshman	F/D				London, Ontario
		John Cutting	Sophomore	F
	(Canada)	Alfred Dion	Junior	F				Ottawa, Ontario
	(Canada)	Wallace Easton	Freshman	G				Renfrew, Ontario
	(Canada)	Wilbur Guest	Freshman	F				Renfrew, Ontario
	(Canada)	W. Harrison Heintzman	Sophomore	F				Arnprior, Ontario
	(United States)	Bill Macartney	Graduate	D				Fort Covington, New York
	(United States)	Lloyd Northrup	Graduate	F				Alexandria Bay, New York
	(Canada)	Raymond Wayland (C)	Senior	D				Montreal, Quebec
	(United States)	Harold Young	Senior	G				Ogdensburg, New York

== Standings ==
1927–28 Eastern Collegiate ice hockey standings
	Intercollegiate							Overall					
	GP	W	L	T	Pct.	GF	GA	GP	W	L	T	GF	GA
Amherst	7	4	2	1	.643	12	7	7	4	2	1	12	7
Army	8	1	7	0	.125	6	36	9	1	8	0	9	44
Bates	10	5	5	0	.500	21	26	12	6	5	1	26	28
Boston College	6	2	3	1	.417	18	23	7	2	4	1	19	25
Boston University	9	6	2	1	.722	42	23	9	6	2	1	42	23
Bowdoin	8	3	5	0	.375	16	27	9	4	5	0	20	28
Brown	–	–	–	–	–	–	–	12	4	8	0	–	–
Clarkson	10	9	1	0	.900	59	13	11	10	1	0	61	14
Colby	5	2	3	0	.400	10	16	7	3	3	1	20	19
Colgate	4	0	4	0	.000	4	18	4	0	4	0	4	18
Cornell	5	2	3	0	.400	11	29	5	2	3	0	11	29
Dartmouth	–	–	–	–	–	–	–	10	6	4	0	64	23
Hamilton	–	–	–	–	–	–	–	8	5	2	1	–	–
Harvard	6	5	1	0	.833	28	8	9	7	2	0	45	13
Holy Cross	–	–	–	–	–	–	–	–	–	–	–	–	–
Massachusetts Agricultural	6	0	6	0	.000	5	17	6	0	6	0	5	17
Middlebury	7	6	1	0	.857	27	10	8	7	1	0	36	11
MIT	5	1	3	1	.300	7	36	5	1	3	1	7	36
New Hampshire	8	6	1	1	.813	27	25	8	6	1	1	27	25
Norwich	–	–	–	–	–	–	–	4	0	2	2	–	–
Princeton	–	–	–	–	–	–	–	12	5	7	0	–	–
Rensselaer	–	–	–	–	–	–	–	4	2	1	1	–	–
St. Lawrence	–	–	–	–	–	–	–	4	2	2	0	–	–
Syracuse	–	–	–	–	–	–	–	–	–	–	–	–	–
Union	5	0	4	1	.100	10	21	5	0	4	1	10	21
Williams	8	6	2	0	.750	27	12	8	6	2	0	27	12
Yale	13	11	2	0	.846	88	22	18	14	4	0	114	39
YMCA College	6	2	4	0	.333	10	15	6	2	4	0	10	15

== Schedule and results ==
Date	Opponent	Site	Result	Record
Regular season
January 11	Victoria*	Ives Park • Potsdam, New York	W 2–1 ^{OT}	1–0–0
January 17	at Army*	Bear Mountain Rink • Bear Mountain State Park	W 1–0	2–0–0
January 18	at Princeton*	Hobey Baker Memorial Rink • Princeton, New Jersey	W 8–5	3–0–0
January 25	St. Lawrence*	Ives Park • Potsdam, New York	W 6–0	4–0–0
January 27	at Syracuse*	Syracuse Coliseum • Syracuse, New York	W 7–0	5–0–0
January 28	at Cornell*	Beebe Lake • Ithaca, New York	W 4–1	6–0–0
February 4	Colgate*	Ives Park • Potsdam, New York	W 4–0	7–0–0
February 8	Syracuse*	Ives Park • Potsdam, New York	W 14–1	8–0–0
February 13	at Middlebury*	Middlebury Rink • Middlebury, Vermont	L 2–3 ^{†}	8–1–0
February 24	at Colgate*	Freshman Football Rink • Hamilton, New York	W 9–1	9–1–0
February 25	at Hamilton*	Russell Sage Rink • Clinton, New York	W 4–2	10–1–0
*Non-conference game.

† Middlebury reports the final score as 2–4.

== Scoring Statistics ==
Name	Position	Games	Goals
Fred Dion	C	11	26
Harrison Heintzman	RW	11	12
Bill Macartney	D	11	7
Johnny Burke	LW/RW/D	9	6
Ray Wayland	D	11	4
Bill Guest	LW	6	3
Lloyd Northup	LW/RW	9	3
Chuck Beneke	D	1	0
John Cutting	LW/RW	2	0
Harry Young	G	2	0
Wally Easton	G	9	0
Total			61

Note: Assists were not recorded as a statistic.

== Goaltending statistics ==
Name	Games	Minutes	Wins	Losses	Ties	Goals against	Shut outs	GAA
Harry Young	2	120	2	0	0	2	1	1.00
Wally Easton	8	480	7	1	0	12	3	1.50

Note: GAA is based upon 60 minutes per game.
