= 1927–28 Boston College Eagles men's ice hockey season =

- Conference: Independent
- Home ice: Boston Arena

Record
- Overall: 2–4–1
- Home: 2–1–0
- Road: 0–1–0
- Neutral: 0–2–1

Coaches and captains
- Head coach: Sonny Foley
- Captain: Joe Fitzgerald

The 1927–28 Boston College Eagles men's ice hockey season was the 11th season of play for the program. The Eagles were coached by Sonny Foley in his 1st season.

== Season ==
After the second departure of Fred Rocque, BC turned to former Eagle Sonny Foley as the new coach. While Foley had only two years of coaching experience, his appointment was brought about due to a new policy by Boston College of hiring alumni. The Eagles also saw some improvement with their scheduling issues with many more intercollegiate games than they had been able to secure over the previous four years, however, five of those games were arranged against Boston University and Holy Cross.

With their limited slate of games, BC wanted to get off to a good start but their first opponent, Yale, was possibly the best college team in the nation. The Bulldogs took no mercy on the Eagles, pressing the visitors all game with an attack led by Ding Palmer. Nick Tedesco scored both goals for BC but it wasn't enough to overcome the speedy Elis.

The team had several weeks to recover from the loss and prepare themselves for the first of three games with BU. Unfortunately, the Eagles were short-handed entering the game as team captain Joe Fitzgerald was suffering from an illness and Larry Gibson had been injured in an off-ice accident. Gibson's understudy, John Kelley played a tremendous game in relief, checking the Terriers hard throughout the match. After Boston University scored twice in the first 10 minutes, Kelley's seemingly held off the dogs by himself for the final 50 minutes, enabling BC to surge ahead in the third. However, BU managed to tie the game late by a low-percentage shot from center ice that somehow eluded Leon Fitzgerald. After 10 minutes of scoreless overtime the game was declared a draw.

At the end of January, BC played host to Holy Cross in what the team hoped would be the first of an enduring rivalry. The game was well played by both sides with each squad attacking the opposing cage repeatedly. Many of the players from both units had previously been teammates at BC High which helped to fuel the intensity of the match. BC opened the game with two goals but those markers were equally before the end of the first. Smokey Kelleher gave BC its second lead in the final minute of the period but just 12 seconds later the Chiefs tied the game once more. Joe Fitzgerald and Gibson combined to put the team ahead for good in the middle of the second and Leon Fitzgerald held Holy Cross scoreless in a raucous final period. The Eagles paused after their first win for the semester break and when they returned the team got ready to face St. Francis Xavier. The visitors from Nova Scotia were a vaunted outfit that was one of the best teams in Canada. BC, however, was undaunted and put forth a brilliant display. The Eagles held the balance of play early but the game soon evened out. Morrissey scored in the second but the Canadians dented the twine twice to take a lead into the third. Several goals were waved off in the match, including a late goal by Gibson for offside, that allowed SFX to head home with a win.

A week later, the second game with BU took place and the rematch was just as close as the first. Gibson opened the scoring on an individual rush up the ice. After BU tied the match, Joe Fitzgerald scored by weaving his way through several Terrier defenders before being the scarlet goalie from a sharp angle. After that flurry in the first, the game sped up in the middle frame, however, a series of great saves prevented all but one BU shot from reaching its mark. Midway through the third, BU got its first lead after a brilliant display of passing and the Eagles could not respond. Teamwork was lacking on the BC side and the team was unable to get any coordination between the forwards. The poor effort overall cost the Eagles and led directly to the loss. The rematch with Holy Cross came next and BC took its frustrations out on the Chiefs. Tedesco led the way with a pair of goals and the defense battered Holy Cross into submission. Boston College was so overwhelming in the match, they caused the opposing netminder to accidentally knock the puck into his own net.

The end of February brought about the final game of the season, however, the team was listless. BC was swept off the ice by the Terriers 0–5 and ended with the worst record in program history.

John A. "Snooks" Kelley served as team manager.

== Roster ==
| No. | Nat. | Player | Class | Pos | Height | Weight | DoB | Hometown | Previous team |
|---|---|---|---|---|---|---|---|---|---|
| | (United States) | Gerald S. Antonia | Junior | | | | 1906-12-31 | Boston, Massachusetts |
| | | Joseph W. Fallon | Sophomore | C |
| | (United States) | Joseph F. Fitzgerald (C) | Senior | D | | | | Boston, Massachusetts |
| | (United States) | Leon C. Fitzgerald | Sophomore | G | | | 1908-01-30 | Weymouth, Massachusetts |
| | (United States) | Lawrence W. Gibson | Sophomore | C | | | | Cambridge, Massachusetts |
| | (United States) | John F. Groden | Sophomore | RW | | | 1908-03-16 | Watertown, Massachusetts |
| | (United States) | Edmund L. Kelleher | Sophomore | | | | | West Roxbury, Massachusetts |
| | (United States) | John F. Kelleher | Senior | LW | | | | Cambridge, Massachusetts |
| | (United States) | John A. Kelley | Senior | C | | | 1907-07-11 | Cambridge, Massachusetts |
| | (United States) | Arthur M. Morrissey | Junior | D | | | | Medford, Massachusetts |
| | (United States) | Perley J. Payson | Sophomore | LW | | | 1906-09-13 | Quincy, Massachusetts |
| | (United States) | Edward G. Sliney | Sophomore | | | | 1905-06-09 | Boston, Massachusetts |
| | (United States) | Nicholas P. Tedesco | Junior | RW | | | | West Newton, Massachusetts |

== Standings ==
1927–28 Eastern Collegiate ice hockey standings
| | Intercollegiate | | | | | | | Overall | | | | | |
| | GP | W | L | T | Pct. | GF | GA | GP | W | L | T | GF | GA |
|---|---|---|---|---|---|---|---|---|---|---|---|---|---|
| Amherst | 7 | 4 | 2 | 1 | .643 | 12 | 7 | 7 | 4 | 2 | 1 | 12 | 7 |
| Army | 8 | 1 | 7 | 0 | .125 | 6 | 36 | 9 | 1 | 8 | 0 | 9 | 44 |
| Bates | 10 | 5 | 5 | 0 | .500 | 21 | 26 | 12 | 6 | 5 | 1 | 26 | 28 |
| Boston College | 6 | 2 | 3 | 1 | .417 | 18 | 23 | 7 | 2 | 4 | 1 | 19 | 25 |
| Boston University | 9 | 6 | 2 | 1 | .722 | 42 | 23 | 9 | 6 | 2 | 1 | 42 | 23 |
| Bowdoin | 8 | 3 | 5 | 0 | .375 | 16 | 27 | 9 | 4 | 5 | 0 | 20 | 28 |
| Brown | – | – | – | – | – | – | – | 12 | 4 | 8 | 0 | – | – |
| Clarkson | 10 | 9 | 1 | 0 | .900 | 59 | 13 | 11 | 10 | 1 | 0 | 61 | 14 |
| Colby | 5 | 2 | 3 | 0 | .400 | 10 | 16 | 7 | 3 | 3 | 1 | 20 | 19 |
| Colgate | 4 | 0 | 4 | 0 | .000 | 4 | 18 | 4 | 0 | 4 | 0 | 4 | 18 |
| Cornell | 5 | 2 | 3 | 0 | .400 | 11 | 29 | 5 | 2 | 3 | 0 | 11 | 29 |
| Dartmouth | – | – | – | – | – | – | – | 10 | 6 | 4 | 0 | 64 | 23 |
| Hamilton | – | – | – | – | – | – | – | 8 | 5 | 2 | 1 | – | – |
| Harvard | 6 | 5 | 1 | 0 | .833 | 28 | 8 | 9 | 7 | 2 | 0 | 45 | 13 |
| Holy Cross | – | – | – | – | – | – | – | – | – | – | – | – | – |
| Massachusetts Agricultural | 6 | 0 | 6 | 0 | .000 | 5 | 17 | 6 | 0 | 6 | 0 | 5 | 17 |
| Middlebury | 7 | 6 | 1 | 0 | .857 | 27 | 10 | 8 | 7 | 1 | 0 | 36 | 11 |
| MIT | 5 | 1 | 3 | 1 | .300 | 7 | 36 | 5 | 1 | 3 | 1 | 7 | 36 |
| New Hampshire | 8 | 6 | 1 | 1 | .813 | 27 | 25 | 8 | 6 | 1 | 1 | 27 | 25 |
| Norwich | – | – | – | – | – | – | – | 4 | 0 | 2 | 2 | – | – |
| Princeton | – | – | – | – | – | – | – | 12 | 5 | 7 | 0 | – | – |
| Rensselaer | – | – | – | – | – | – | – | 4 | 2 | 1 | 1 | – | – |
| St. Lawrence | – | – | – | – | – | – | – | 4 | 2 | 2 | 0 | – | – |
| Syracuse | – | – | – | – | – | – | – | – | – | – | – | – | – |
| Union | 5 | 0 | 4 | 1 | .100 | 10 | 21 | 5 | 0 | 4 | 1 | 10 | 21 |
| Williams | 8 | 6 | 2 | 0 | .750 | 27 | 12 | 8 | 6 | 2 | 0 | 27 | 12 |
| Yale | 13 | 11 | 2 | 0 | .846 | 88 | 22 | 18 | 14 | 4 | 0 | 114 | 39 |
| YMCA College | 6 | 2 | 4 | 0 | .333 | 10 | 15 | 6 | 2 | 4 | 0 | 10 | 15 |

== Schedule and results ==
| Date | Opponent | Site | Result | Record |
Regular Season
| December 31 | at Yale* | New Haven Arena • New Haven, Connecticut | L 2–5 | 0–1–0 |
| January 20 | vs. Boston University* | Boston Arena • Boston, Massachusetts (Rivalry) | T 3–3 ^{2OT} | 0–1–1 |
| January 28 | Holy Cross* | Boston Arena • Boston, Massachusetts | W 5–4 | 1–1–1 |
| February 8 | St. Francis Xavier* | Boston Arena • Boston, Massachusetts | L 1–2 | 1–2–1 |
| February 15 | vs. Boston University* | Boston Arena • Boston, Massachusetts (Rivalry) | L 2–3 | 1–3–1 |
| February 23 | Holy Cross* | Boston Arena • Boston, Massachusetts | W 6–3 | 2–3–1 |
| February 29 | vs. Boston University* | Boston Arena • Boston, Massachusetts (Rivalry) | L 0–5 | 2–4–1 |
*Non-conference game.
