= 1927–28 Middlebury Panthers men's ice hockey season =

- Conference: Independent
- Home ice: Middlebury Rink

Record
- Overall: 7–1–0
- Home: 3–0–0
- Road: 4–1–0

Coaches and captains
- Head coach: Carleton Simmons
- Captain: Carleton Simmons

The 1927–28 Middlebury Panthers men's ice hockey season was the 6th season of play for the program. The Panthers were led by player/coach by Carleton Simmons in his 2nd season.

== Season ==
After an undefeated season, Middlebury was hoping for more of the same with five of its starters returning. With only the goaltending position in question at the start of the season, Carleton Simmons was set to lead the team once more. Unfortunately, the Panthers were met with poor weather that persisted throughout the season. The lack of ice prevented the team from being able to practice and forced them to rely on their experience far too often.

Middlebury began the year at Amherst, after having to cancel its first two scheduled games. The team was far better in terms of play on the ice, however, the Panthers' offence had difficulty in getting on track. Whittemore scored the only goal in regulation at the end of the second despite the blues playing in the opposing end for most of the game. Amherst managed a tying goal in the third. The first overtime saw the first time on the evening where both sides appeared to be equal, however, Whittemore nabbed his second marker in the second extra period and the team was able to hold off the Sabrinas for the win. The following day, Middlebury headed southeast to meet Brown. With a good sheet of ice beneath them, the offense was able to demonstrate their prowess, however, they were met by a physical brand of hockey from the Bears. The two teams raced up and down the ice alternating between hard hits and spectacular goals. Brown opened the match with 2 goals early in the first but the defense stiffened afterwards. Simmons netted his first of the season in the back half of the period, however, a third goal from the home team found the back of the next with just over a minute to play. Facing an uphill climb, Middlebury redoubled its efforts in the second and scored three times with captain Simmons having a hand in each. Brown added two more to their total, leaving the Panthers down by 1 entering the third. Unfortunately, the Bears scored less than 30 seconds into the final frame, leaving little margin for the Panthers. In the middle of the period, Whittemore scored to cut the lead to one and then continued to pressure the home team for the rest of the match. Near the end of regulation, Whittemore's third marker appeared to tie the game, however, the referee ruled that the Panthers had been offside and disallowed the goal. They were unable to get another chance in the scant time remaining and lost their first game in almost two years. The game was also important for being the first time the team played a 60-minute match in regulation.

The following week, Middlebury was on the road again. Their first stop was in Rutland to take on the local athletic association. The game was never close with all three starting forwards able to score seemingly at will. The final score provided the club with its largest margin of victory but effectively served as more of a practice game than an actual contest. It wasn't until they got to New York that the Panthers got a decent challenge, this time in the form of Army. The Cadets Put up a good showing, particularly in goal, but they could not contain the stellar Middlebury offense for the entire night. Whittemore's pair in the second proved to be the deciding factor and even a surge from Army in the third could not overcome the Panther defenses.

In early February, the team played its first home game of the season. Unfortunately the ice was only barely playable with puddles covering much of its surface thanks to warm weather conditions. The periods were limited to just 10 minutes each as a result and only allowed intermittent individual plays. Whittemore tallied twice, providing the only scoring in the match, to give the Panthers a leg up in the state championship series. This was also the first game for Bates and Douglas as starters as Gruggel and Melbye had been ruled academically ineligible. The next game saw the Panthers again score 9 goals, this time in an intercollegiate game. Vermont was completely overwhelmed by the Panthers, who recorded their third straight shutout. After that blowout, the team returned home to meet possibly the strongest team outside of the Ivy League in Clarkson. The undefeated Knights arrived with championship aspirations and the match was treated with the utmost seriousness. Two referees were used in the clash of collegiate titans with both beginning cautiously. The slow pace was ended by a mad dash up the ice by Kelley, who secured the first goal before the 5-minnute mark. Both clubs then got on their horses and raced up and down the ice, probing the defenses. Clarkson tied the score just before the end of the period but that did not detract from the tremendous saves that Douglas had already made. The start of the second was delayed when a dog found its way onto the ice but that didn't slow down the match. After a scramble in front of the Green's cage, Kelley slapped the puck into the goal. Clarkson protested that a penalty should have been assessed for rough play but the officials disagreed and allowed the goal to stand. Both defenses held firm for the remainder of the period, leaving the Panthers with the edge entering the final period. Just over a minute into the third, the Golden Knights tied the score and then harassed Douglas for long stretches in the Middlebury end. The blue netminder kept his team in the game, stopping shot after shot to keep the score knotted. Past the midway point of the match, Whittemore broke away for a rare rush at the Clarkson net and fired a hard shot that surprised even the goal judge. Once the puck was located in the netting, Middlebury was confirmed to be in the lead for the third time. Clarkson increased their pressure in the final minutes but the only goal came from the stick of Whittemore. The Knights protested, believing his shot had entered the cage through a hole in the netting but both referees allowed the marker to stand and Middlebury skated away with possibly the biggest victory in program history.

After the exhausting game, Middlebury hosted Vermont for a rematch and were nearly handed a massive upset. The Catamounts played a much stronger game than the first time around and held the Panther offense in check for most of the night. It was only through the strong work of the defense that allowed the game to head into overtime where Middlebury was able to eke out a narrow victory. The win ensured that the team would retain the Vermont State Championship and, along with the defeat of Clarkson, enable the team to once again stake their claim as the best small school in the nation.

Harold E. Kinne served as team manager with Russell D. Brown as his assistant.

== Roster ==
No.	Nat.	Player	Class	Pos	Height	Weight	DoB	Hometown	Previous team
		Edmond W. Bates	Freshman	D
	(United States)	Frederick G. Bossert	Junior	D			1907-08-15	Brooklyn, New York
	(United States)	Gordon L. Douglas	Junior	G			1907-11-06	Flushing, New York
	(United States)	Folke Gruggel	Junior	D			1908-02-28	Beechhurst, New York
	(United States)	Ralph A. Hill	Senior	D/RW			1906-03-23	Walpole, Massachusetts
	(United States)	Theodore T. Huntington	Sophomore	C/RW				New Rochelle, New York
	(United States)	Stillman F. Kelley II	Junior	C/RW			1906-06-03	Lexington, Massachusetts
	(United States)	Robert P. McLeod	Sophomore	LW			1908-03-28	Natick, Massachusetts
	(United States)	Gordon H. Melbye	Sophomore	G			1907-05-02	Norfolk, Massachusetts
	(United States)	Carleton H. Simmons (C)	Senior	LW			1905-06-04	Wellesley Hills, Massachusetts
	(United States)	Harold B. Whittemore	Senior	C/RW			1903-05-10	Brookline, Massachusetts

== Standings ==
1927–28 Eastern Collegiate ice hockey standings
	Intercollegiate							Overall					
	GP	W	L	T	Pct.	GF	GA	GP	W	L	T	GF	GA
Amherst	7	4	2	1	.643	12	7	7	4	2	1	12	7
Army	8	1	7	0	.125	6	36	9	1	8	0	9	44
Bates	10	5	5	0	.500	21	26	12	6	5	1	26	28
Boston College	6	2	3	1	.417	18	23	7	2	4	1	19	25
Boston University	9	6	2	1	.722	42	23	9	6	2	1	42	23
Bowdoin	8	3	5	0	.375	16	27	9	4	5	0	20	28
Brown	–	–	–	–	–	–	–	12	4	8	0	–	–
Clarkson	10	9	1	0	.900	59	13	11	10	1	0	61	14
Colby	5	2	3	0	.400	10	16	7	3	3	1	20	19
Colgate	4	0	4	0	.000	4	18	4	0	4	0	4	18
Cornell	5	2	3	0	.400	11	29	5	2	3	0	11	29
Dartmouth	–	–	–	–	–	–	–	10	6	4	0	64	23
Hamilton	–	–	–	–	–	–	–	8	5	2	1	–	–
Harvard	6	5	1	0	.833	28	8	9	7	2	0	45	13
Holy Cross	–	–	–	–	–	–	–	–	–	–	–	–	–
Massachusetts Agricultural	6	0	6	0	.000	5	17	6	0	6	0	5	17
Middlebury	7	6	1	0	.857	27	10	8	7	1	0	36	11
MIT	5	1	3	1	.300	7	36	5	1	3	1	7	36
New Hampshire	8	6	1	1	.813	27	25	8	6	1	1	27	25
Norwich	–	–	–	–	–	–	–	4	0	2	2	–	–
Princeton	–	–	–	–	–	–	–	12	5	7	0	–	–
Rensselaer	–	–	–	–	–	–	–	4	2	1	1	–	–
St. Lawrence	–	–	–	–	–	–	–	4	2	2	0	–	–
Syracuse	–	–	–	–	–	–	–	–	–	–	–	–	–
Union	5	0	4	1	.100	10	21	5	0	4	1	10	21
Williams	8	6	2	0	.750	27	12	8	6	2	0	27	12
Yale	13	11	2	0	.846	88	22	18	14	4	0	114	39
YMCA College	6	2	4	0	.333	10	15	6	2	4	0	10	15

== Schedule and results ==
Date	Opponent	Site	Result	Record
Regular Season
January 13	at Amherst*	Pratt Field Rink • Amherst, Massachusetts	W 2–1 ^{2OT}	1–0–0
January 14	at Brown*	Rhode Island Auditorium • Providence, Rhode Island	L 5–6	1–1–0
January ?	at Rutland Athletic Association*	Rutland, Vermont	W 9–1	2–1–0
January 28	at Army*	Bear Mountain Rink • Bear Mountain, New York	W 3–0	3–1–0
February 4	Norwich*	Middlebury Rink • Middlebury, Vermont	W 2–0	4–1–0
February ?	at Vermont*	Centennial Rink • Burlington, Vermont	W 9–0	5–1–0
February 13	Clarkson*	Middlebury Rink • Middlebury, Vermont	W 4–2	6–1–0
February 14	Vermont*	Middlebury Rink • Middlebury, Vermont	W 2–1 ^{OT}	7–1–0
*Non-conference game.
