= 1927–28 Harvard Crimson men's ice hockey season =

College ice hockey season

- Conference: Independent
- Home ice: Boston Arena

Record
- Overall: 7–2–0
- Home: 4–1–0
- Road: 1–0–0
- Neutral: 2–1–0

Coaches and captains
- Head coach: Joseph Stubbs
- Captain: John Chase

The 1927–28 Harvard Crimson men's ice hockey season was the 30th season of play for the program.

== Season ==
Joseph Stubbs was brought in as the program's 4th head coach and like his predecessors he was a Harvard grad. Unlike the previous three coaches, however, Stubbs had not been a member of the team. That seemed to make little difference when the team began the season with a 9–0 drubbing of MIT. The Crimson played well thorough the early part of their season, winning their first three games before dropping a match against McGill at Madison Square Garden.

Harvard dominated in their next two games, but those matches were spread out over a month. By mid-February the Crimson had played only three games from the start of the year and when they met Dartmouth the Indians finally broke through with their first win over Harvard in four years. Following their second loss, Harvard had just its series with Yale remaining and the two titans fought a close battle in the first match. Regulation ended in a 1–1 draw and the arrangement between the two teams called for two 5-minute overtime periods to be played. John Chase scored mid-way through the first and then the Harvard defense held the fort to earn the Crimson the win.

The rematch was played a week later and this time Harvard was able to win the game in regulation, shutting down Yale's offense. The win prevented Yale from being able to claim an Intercollegiate championship, with the Eli's having been undefeated against all other collegiate opponents. Because Dartmouth, Harvard and Yale had all defeated one another during the season and with no conference championship to settle the difference, no Eastern champion was named in 1928.

== Roster ==
| No. | Nat. | Player | Class | Pos | Height | Weight | DoB | Hometown | Previous team |
|---|---|---|---|---|---|---|---|---|---|
| | | Albert S. Bigelow | Junior | D |
| | | Hugh W. Bigelow | Junior | D |
| | (United States) | John P. Chase (C) | Senior | C | | | 1906-06-12 | Milton, Massachusetts |
| | | C. P. Clifford | Graduate | LW |
| | | John Cross | Sophomore | LW |
| | | Davis | | C |
| | | Rene F. G. Giddens | Sophomore | LW/RW |
| | | Guy C. Holbrook Jr. | Sophomore | C |
| | | Willard Howard | Graduate | D |
| | | Waldo Howland | Sophomore | RW |
| | | Charles B. Lakin | Sophomore | RW |
| | | Mills | | LW/RW |
| | | Joseph Morill Jr. | Senior | G |
| | | B. Henry Newell | Junior | G |
| | | Arthur W. Richardson | | C |
| | | William G. Saltonstall | Senior | D |
| | | John Tudor | Junior | LW/RW |
| | | H. T. Wetmore | Sophomore | LW/RW |

== Standings ==
1927–28 Eastern Collegiate ice hockey standings
| | Intercollegiate | | | | | | | Overall | | | | | |
| | GP | W | L | T | Pct. | GF | GA | GP | W | L | T | GF | GA |
|---|---|---|---|---|---|---|---|---|---|---|---|---|---|
| Amherst | 7 | 4 | 2 | 1 | .643 | 12 | 7 | 7 | 4 | 2 | 1 | 12 | 7 |
| Army | 8 | 1 | 7 | 0 | .125 | 6 | 36 | 9 | 1 | 8 | 0 | 9 | 44 |
| Bates | 10 | 5 | 5 | 0 | .500 | 21 | 26 | 12 | 6 | 5 | 1 | 26 | 28 |
| Boston College | 6 | 2 | 3 | 1 | .417 | 18 | 23 | 7 | 2 | 4 | 1 | 19 | 25 |
| Boston University | 9 | 6 | 2 | 1 | .722 | 42 | 23 | 9 | 6 | 2 | 1 | 42 | 23 |
| Bowdoin | 8 | 3 | 5 | 0 | .375 | 16 | 27 | 9 | 4 | 5 | 0 | 20 | 28 |
| Brown | – | – | – | – | – | – | – | 12 | 4 | 8 | 0 | – | – |
| Clarkson | 10 | 9 | 1 | 0 | .900 | 59 | 13 | 11 | 10 | 1 | 0 | 61 | 14 |
| Colby | 5 | 2 | 3 | 0 | .400 | 10 | 16 | 7 | 3 | 3 | 1 | 20 | 19 |
| Colgate | 4 | 0 | 4 | 0 | .000 | 4 | 18 | 4 | 0 | 4 | 0 | 4 | 18 |
| Cornell | 5 | 2 | 3 | 0 | .400 | 11 | 29 | 5 | 2 | 3 | 0 | 11 | 29 |
| Dartmouth | – | – | – | – | – | – | – | 10 | 6 | 4 | 0 | 64 | 23 |
| Hamilton | – | – | – | – | – | – | – | 8 | 5 | 2 | 1 | – | – |
| Harvard | 5 | 4 | 1 | 0 | .800 | 26 | 8 | 9 | 7 | 2 | 0 | 45 | 13 |
| Holy Cross | – | – | – | – | – | – | – | – | – | – | – | – | – |
| Massachusetts Agricultural | 6 | 0 | 6 | 0 | .000 | 5 | 17 | 6 | 0 | 6 | 0 | 5 | 17 |
| Middlebury | 7 | 6 | 1 | 0 | .857 | 27 | 10 | 8 | 7 | 1 | 0 | 36 | 11 |
| MIT | 5 | 1 | 3 | 1 | .300 | 7 | 36 | 5 | 1 | 3 | 1 | 7 | 36 |
| New Hampshire | 8 | 6 | 1 | 1 | .813 | 27 | 25 | 8 | 6 | 1 | 1 | 27 | 25 |
| Norwich | – | – | – | – | – | – | – | 4 | 0 | 2 | 2 | – | – |
| Princeton | – | – | – | – | – | – | – | 12 | 5 | 7 | 0 | – | – |
| Rensselaer | – | – | – | – | – | – | – | 4 | 2 | 1 | 1 | – | – |
| St. Lawrence | – | – | – | – | – | – | – | 4 | 2 | 2 | 0 | – | – |
| Syracuse | – | – | – | – | – | – | – | – | – | – | – | – | – |
| Union | 5 | 0 | 4 | 1 | .100 | 10 | 21 | 5 | 0 | 4 | 1 | 10 | 21 |
| Williams | 8 | 6 | 2 | 0 | .750 | 27 | 12 | 8 | 6 | 2 | 0 | 27 | 12 |
| Yale | 13 | 11 | 2 | 0 | .846 | 88 | 22 | 18 | 14 | 4 | 0 | 114 | 39 |
| YMCA College | 6 | 2 | 4 | 0 | .333 | 10 | 15 | 6 | 2 | 4 | 0 | 10 | 15 |

== Schedule and results ==
| Date | Opponent | Site | Result | Record |
Regular Season
| December 9 | vs. MIT* | Boston Arena • Boston, Massachusetts | W 9–0 | 1–0–0 |
| December 16 | vs. Boston University* | Boston Arena • Boston, Massachusetts | W 5–3 | 2–0–0 |
| December 31 | Toronto* | Boston Arena • Boston, Massachusetts | W 4–1 | 3–0–0 |
| January 7 | vs. McGill* | Madison Square Garden • Manhattan, New York | L 1–3 | 3–1–0 |
| January 18 | Brown* | Boston Arena • Boston, Massachusetts | W 7–0 | 4–1–0 |
| February 9 | St. Francis Xavier* | Boston Arena • Boston, Massachusetts | W 12–1 | 5–1–0 |
| February 18 | Dartmouth* | Boston Arena • Boston, Massachusetts | L 1–4 | 5–2–0 |
| February 25 | at Yale* | New Haven Arena • New Haven, Connecticut (Rivalry) | W 2–1 ^{2OT} | 6–2–0 |
| March 3 | Yale* | Boston Arena • Boston, Massachusetts (Rivalry) | W 2–0 | 7–2–0 |
*Non-conference game.
