= 1927–28 Bates Bobcats men's ice hockey season =

Intercollegiate hockey season

- Conference: Independent
- Home ice: Bartlett Street Rink

Record
- Overall: 6–5–1
- Home: 2–3–1
- Road: 4–2–0

Coaches and captains
- Head coach: Carleton Wiggin
- Captain: Howard White

The 1927–28 Bates men's ice hockey season was the 9th season of play for the program.

== Season ==
Before the start of the season, the team took a hit because John Cogan was academically ineligible. Fortunately, the team returned many players from last year's squad and had some experience to rely upon in his absence. The team opened the season with a win against an amateur club with Zeke Secor having a hand in all three goals. The team then embarked on its annual trip south and came up with a pair of 2–0 wins. Bob Violette was the star of the team to that point, not having allowed a single goal through the first three games to set a new program record.

Bates finally surrendered its first goal of the season to Bowdoin but the offensive unit of Foster, White and Secor came through once more to lead the team to victory. By the time the team met Colby, they were playing their fourth game in eight days and were unable to sustain their winning streak. Despite the best efforts of the Mules, however, the Bobcats wouldn't go away. Secor's goal in the third sent the game into overtime and it took 4 extra periods before Colby could net the winner. The loss heralded a down period of the season for Bates as the Garnet lost the next two games as well. The team wasn't quite able to stand up to the attack from New Hampshire and allowed 5 goals to the Wildcats but the worst came when they lost the rematch to Colby in another overtime thriller. The second loss to the Mules meant that Bates would not be able to win a state championship. Just before the break, Bates welcomed the Aggies for a return match and were able to end their 3-game losing skid.

Cogan was successful during the exam break and rejoined the team after becoming eligible once more. He hit the ice just in time for the team's game against Yale, the best team in the nation. Foster dropped back to defense, giving Cogan the spot at center. This allowed Cogan to score his first goal of the season however, while Secor secured 2 more, the Bobcats were hopelessly outgunned by the Bulldogs and fell 3–12. The team returned home and found a group of Canadians waiting for them in the form of Acadia. The unfamiliar foes were mostly even as they battled through a fast game. Johnny Cogan bookended the scoring that finished up 2-all after regulation. Two overtime periods went by without another marker and the game was called a draw. A week later, weather hampered the rematch with Bowdoin. An early thaw caused the ice to become soft and slow which made skating rather difficult. Only one goal was scored in the game and it came from the stick of a Polar Bear. The loss placed Bates at the bottom of the state rankings and gave the Garnet a terrible result despite an otherwise strong season.

Bates ended is season on a high note, however, as the team travelled down to Providence and came away with a 4–2 win. Cogan was the individual star of the game and helped the team post a winning record for the second straight year.

Leon Grant served as team manager.

== Roster ==
No.	Nat.	Player	Class	Pos	Height	Weight	DoB	Hometown	Previous team
	(United States)	James M. Burke	Senior	LW/RW			1904-06-26	Ipswich, Massachusetts
	(United States)	John B. Cogan	Sophomore	C			1908-08-06	Stoneham, Massachusetts
	(United States)	Edward I. Erickson	Senior	D			1906-12-02	Newburyport, Massachusetts
	(United States)	Lewis F. Foster	Senior	C/D			1906-10-14	Belmont, Massachusetts
		Bertram C. Gleason	Freshman	C/RW
	(United States)	Maurice J. Lane	Junior	D/RW			1906-07-13	Lewiston, Maine
	(United States)	Harold W. Louder	Sophomore				1908-01-24	Pittsfield, Maine
	(United States)	Pierce M. Maher Jr.	Junior	D			1906-01-30	New Haven, Connecticut
	(United States)	Cecil F. Pooler	Junior	D			1908-09-27	Brewer, Maine
	(United States)	Morris H. Secor	Sophomore	LW			1908-07-19	Belmont, Massachusetts
		Raoul H. Violette	Sophomore	G			1905-07-21
	(United States)	Howard S. White (C)	Senior	RW			1907-04-27	Belmont, Massachusetts

== Standings ==
1927–28 Eastern Collegiate ice hockey standings
	Intercollegiate							Overall					
	GP	W	L	T	Pct.	GF	GA	GP	W	L	T	GF	GA
Amherst	7	4	2	1	.643	12	7	7	4	2	1	12	7
Army	8	1	7	0	.125	6	36	9	1	8	0	9	44
Bates	10	5	5	0	.500	21	26	12	6	5	1	26	28
Boston College	6	2	3	1	.417	18	23	7	2	4	1	19	25
Boston University	9	6	2	1	.722	42	23	9	6	2	1	42	23
Bowdoin	8	3	5	0	.375	16	27	9	4	5	0	20	28
Brown	–	–	–	–	–	–	–	12	4	8	0	–	–
Clarkson	10	9	1	0	.900	59	13	11	10	1	0	61	14
Colby	5	2	3	0	.400	10	16	7	3	3	1	20	19
Colgate	4	0	4	0	.000	4	18	4	0	4	0	4	18
Cornell	5	2	3	0	.400	11	29	5	2	3	0	11	29
Dartmouth	–	–	–	–	–	–	–	10	6	4	0	64	23
Hamilton	–	–	–	–	–	–	–	8	5	2	1	–	–
Harvard	5	4	1	0	.800	26	8	9	7	2	0	45	13
Holy Cross	–	–	–	–	–	–	–	–	–	–	–	–	–
Massachusetts Agricultural	6	0	6	0	.000	5	17	6	0	6	0	5	17
Middlebury	7	6	1	0	.857	27	10	8	7	1	0	36	11
MIT	5	1	3	1	.300	7	36	5	1	3	1	7	36
New Hampshire	8	6	1	1	.813	27	25	8	6	1	1	27	25
Norwich	–	–	–	–	–	–	–	4	0	2	2	–	–
Princeton	–	–	–	–	–	–	–	12	5	7	0	–	–
Rensselaer	–	–	–	–	–	–	–	4	2	1	1	–	–
St. Lawrence	–	–	–	–	–	–	–	4	2	2	0	–	–
Syracuse	–	–	–	–	–	–	–	–	–	–	–	–	–
Union	5	0	4	1	.100	10	21	5	0	4	1	10	21
Williams	8	6	2	0	.750	27	12	8	6	2	0	27	12
Yale	13	11	2	0	.846	88	22	18	14	4	0	114	39
YMCA College	6	2	4	0	.333	10	15	6	2	4	0	10	15

== Schedule and results ==
Date	Opponent	Site	Result	Record
Regular Season
January 4	Brunswick Cabots*	Bartlett Street Rink • Lewiston, Maine	W 3–0	1–0–0
January 12	at Massachusetts Agricultural*	Alumni Field Rink • Amherst, Massachusetts	W 2–0	2–0–0
January 14	at Army*	Bear Mountain Rink • Bear Mountain, New York	W 2–0	3–0–0
January 16	at Bowdoin*	Delta Rink • Brunswick, Maine	W 3–1	4–0–0
January 17	Colby*	Bartlett Street Rink • Lewiston, Maine	L 1–2 ^{4OT}	4–1–0
January 20	New Hampshire*	Bartlett Street Rink • Lewiston, Maine	L 3–5	4–2–0
January 26	at Colby*	Colby Rink • Waterville, Maine	L 1–2 ^{4OT}	4–3–0
January 28	Massachusetts Agricultural*	Bartlett Street Rink • Lewiston, Maine	W 2–1	5–3–0
February 8	at Yale*	New Haven Arena • New Haven, Connecticut	L 3–12	5–4–0
February 11	Acadia*	Bartlett Street Rink • Lewiston, Maine	T 2–2 ^{2OT}	5–4–1
February 16	Bowdoin*	Bartlett Street Rink • Lewiston, Maine	L 0–1	5–5–1
February 25	at Brown*	Rhode Island Auditorium • Providence, Rhode Island	W 4–2	6–5–1
*Non-conference game.
