= 1927–28 United States collegiate men's ice hockey season =

- Duration: December 1927– March 1928
- East Collegiate champion: None
- West Collegiate champion: Marquette

The 1927–28 United States collegiate men's ice hockey season was the 34th season of collegiate ice hockey in the United States.

== Regular season ==
=== Standings ===
1927–28 Eastern Collegiate ice hockey standings
	Intercollegiate							Overall					
	GP	W	L	T	Pct.	GF	GA	GP	W	L	T	GF	GA
Amherst	7	4	2	1	.643	12	7	7	4	2	1	12	7
Army	8	1	7	0	.125	6	36	9	1	8	0	9	44
Bates	10	5	5	0	.500	21	26	12	6	5	1	26	28
Boston College	6	2	3	1	.417	18	23	7	2	4	1	19	25
Boston University	9	6	2	1	.722	42	23	9	6	2	1	42	23
Bowdoin	8	3	5	0	.375	16	27	9	4	5	0	20	28
Brown	–	–	–	–	–	–	–	12	4	8	0	–	–
Clarkson	10	9	1	0	.900	59	13	11	10	1	0	61	14
Colby	5	2	3	0	.400	10	16	7	3	3	1	20	19
Colgate	4	0	4	0	.000	4	18	4	0	4	0	4	18
Cornell	5	2	3	0	.400	11	29	5	2	3	0	11	29
Dartmouth	–	–	–	–	–	–	–	10	6	4	0	64	23
Hamilton	–	–	–	–	–	–	–	8	5	2	1	–	–
Harvard	6	5	1	0	.833	28	8	9	7	2	0	45	13
Holy Cross	–	–	–	–	–	–	–	–	–	–	–	–	–
Massachusetts Agricultural	6	0	6	0	.000	5	17	6	0	6	0	5	17
Middlebury	7	6	1	0	.857	27	10	8	7	1	0	36	11
MIT	5	1	3	1	.300	7	36	5	1	3	1	7	36
New Hampshire	8	6	1	1	.813	27	25	8	6	1	1	27	25
Norwich	–	–	–	–	–	–	–	4	0	2	2	–	–
Princeton	–	–	–	–	–	–	–	12	5	7	0	–	–
Rensselaer	–	–	–	–	–	–	–	4	2	1	1	–	–
St. Lawrence	–	–	–	–	–	–	–	4	2	2	0	–	–
Syracuse	–	–	–	–	–	–	–	–	–	–	–	–	–
Union	5	0	4	1	.100	10	21	5	0	4	1	10	21
Williams	8	6	2	0	.750	27	12	8	6	2	0	27	12
Yale	13	11	2	0	.846	88	22	18	14	4	0	114	39
YMCA College	6	2	4	0	.333	10	15	6	2	4	0	10	15

1927–28 Western Collegiate ice hockey standings
	Intercollegiate							Overall					
	GP	W	L	T	Pct.	GF	GA	GP	W	L	T	GF	GA
Marquette	8	6	1	1	.813	25	12	14	12	1	1	62	23
Michigan	12	2	9	1	.208	12	27	13	2	10	1	12	31
Michigan State	4	1	3	0	.250	4	14	6	3	3	0	6	14
Michigan Tech	–	–	–	–	–	–	–	6	5	1	0	–	–
Minnesota	13	9	2	2	.769	49	15	13	9	2	2	49	15
North Dakota Agricultural	–	–	–	–	–	–	–	–	–	–	–	–	–
Occidental	–	–	–	–	–	–	–	–	–	–	–	–	–
UCLA	5	1	4	0	.200	10	17	5	1	4	0	10	17
USC	–	–	–	–	–	–	–	–	–	–	–	–	–
Wisconsin	12	3	6	3	.375	14	27	16	5	7	4	23	32

1927–28 Minnesota Intercollegiate Athletic Conference ice hockey standings
	Conference							Overall					
	GP	W	L	T	PTS	GF	GA	GP	W	L	T	GF	GA
Augsburg †	–	–	–	–	–	–	–	–	–	–	–	–	–
Concordia	–	–	–	–	–	–	–	6	4	2	0	–	–
Hamline	–	–	–	–	–	–	–	–	–	–	–	–	–
Macalester	–	–	–	–	–	–	–	–	–	–	–	–	–
Saint Mary's	–	–	–	–	–	–	–	–	–	–	–	–	–
St. Olaf	–	–	–	–	–	–	–	6	1	3	2	–	–
St. Thomas	–	–	–	–	–	–	–	12	4	5	3	–	–
† indicates conference champion
