= Eddie Roundy =

American athletics coach

Biographical details
- Born: December 19, 1891; Fairfield, Maine, U.S.
- Died: July 14, 1954 (aged 62); Waterville, Maine, U.S.

Playing career

Baseball
- 1911–1914: St. Lawrence

Football
- 1912–1913: St. Lawrence

Basketball
- 1912–1914: St. Lawrence
- Positions: Quarterback (football); Catcher (baseball); Guard (basketball)

Coaching career (HC unless noted)

Football
- 1915–1917: St. Lawrence
- 1919: Kents Hill School
- 1920–1922: Hampden–Sydney
- 1924–1936: Colby

Basketball
- 1915–1917: St. Lawrence
- 1919–1920: Kents Hill School
- 1920–1923: Hampden–Sydney
- 1937–1942: Colby
- 1944–1946: Colby

Baseball
- 1916–1917: St. Lawrence
- 1925–1942: Colby
- 1944: Colby
- 1946–1953: Colby

Ice hockey
- 1924–1929: Colby

Administrative career (AD unless noted)
- 1920–1923: Hampden–Sydney

Head coaching record
- Overall: 12–33 (basketball); 7–19–3 (ice hockey)

Edward Cilley Roundy (December 19, 1891 – July 14, 1954) was an American football, basketball, baseball, and ice hockey coach. He served as the head football coach at St. Lawrence University in 1917, Hampden–Sydney College from 1920 to 1922, and Colby College from 1924 to 1936.

== Athletics ==
Roundy was raised in Portland, Maine and attended St. Lawrence College in Canton, New York, where he lettered in four sports (football, baseball, basketball, and track). He played quarterback for St. Lawrence's football team and guard for the basketball team. In baseball, he was a catcher and served as team captain his senior season. After graduating, he spent one year as vice principal and athletic director at Canton High School.

== Coaching ==
In 1915, Roundy returned to St. Lawrence as athletics coach. During World War I, he was a lieutenant in the United States Army Sanitary Corps. In 1919, he became the athletic director at Kents Hill School in Kents Hill, Maine. From 1920 to 1923, Roundy coached at Hampden–Sydney College. He compiled a 12–13–1 record in football and a 12–33 record in basketball.

After a year away from coaching, Roundy returned to his native Maine as the head football and baseball coach at Colby College. That winter, he was also appointed coach of the hockey team, succeeding Euclid Helie, a French professor who had coached the team on a voluntary basis. In 1929, his assistant, Bill Millett, took over the hockey team. In 13 seasons under Roundy, Colby's football teams went 38–48–5, including a 17–20–2 record against their in-state rivals. Following the 1936 season, athletic director Gilbert Loebs removed Roundy as football coach, but allowed him to remain as varsity baseball and freshman basketball coach. In 1937, basketball was made a varsity sport and Roundy served as the Mules' inaugural coach. His basketball teams won four Maine Intercollegiate Athletic Association titles. During World War II, Roundy reentered the Army. He served as a lieutenant in the military police before being promoted to captain in the Special Services and given charge of athletic recreation at Fort Dix. He resumed his coaching duties at Colby in November 1944. In 1946, illness forced him to step down as basketball coach. He continued to coach the Mules baseball team until he suffered a heart attack at the start of the 1954 season.

== Other work ==
Roundy was a longtime racing steward at Scarborough Downs. In 1949, he was appointed police commissioner of Waterville, Maine. Roundy died on July 14, 1954, at the age of 62, of a heart attack at home in Waterville.

== Head coaching record ==
=== Ice hockey ===
Record table
Season	Team	Overall	Conference	Standing	Postseason
Colby Independent (1924–1929)
1924–25	Colby	0–4–0			
1925–26	Colby	1–4–1			
1926–27	Colby	3–4–0			
1927–28	Colby	3–3–1			
1928–29	Colby	0–4–1			
Colby:		7–19–3			
Total:		7–19–3			
