= 1926–27 Boston College Eagles men's ice hockey season =

- Conference: Independent
- Home ice: Boston Arena

Record
- Overall: 3–3–0
- Home: 1–1–0
- Road: 1–0–0
- Neutral: 1–2–0

Coaches and captains
- Head coach: Fred Rocque
- Captain: Tubber Cronin

The 1926–27 Boston College Eagles men's ice hockey season was the 10th season of play for the program. The Eagles were coached by Fred Rocque in his 5th season.

== Season ==
Before the season began, Boston College's issues with securing opponents came to a head and the team was only able to secure seven game for their entire slate. Worse, just three of those matches would come against their contemporaries, meaning that the Eagles would have no chance to win a championship of any kind.

Despite this setback, Rocque put the team through its paces to get ready for the opening match with Toronto, who were perhaps the best college team from Canada that season. The Eagles played well for it being their opening game but were outmatched by the Varsity Blues. Team captain "Tubber" Cronin scored BC's only goal in the loss. Two weeks later the team took on an all-star team of college graduates, which included NHL-caliber players like George Owen and Bob Hall. BC defense showed out, holding the aggregation to just 2 goals on the night, however, the Eagle offense was still lacking and didn't manage a goal in the game.

In the second half of January, Boston College played their only two intercollegiate games of the year. The first came against MIT and saw the team put up a similar effort as the all-star game, however, since the Engineers were a much weaker opponent, the team was able to put off a win with just one goal from Gibson. Unfortunately, the match with Army had to be cancelled due a lack of ice. A week later, the annual rivalry with Boston University was renewed, however, the offense was particularly inept and only a tremendous rush up the ice by Joe Fitzgerald kept the team from being shutout.

A day after the BU loss, the offense finally came to life against the Springfield Outing Club despite Cronin being absent from the match. McGovern opened the scoring in the first but it was the 3-goal flurry at the start of the second that decided the game. Tedesco's marker was followed by two from Kelleher, giving the team a 4–1 lead and they managed to hold on until the end of the 45-minute game. After their second win, the team had to wait almost a full month for their final match. When Loyola arrived in town, there was no telling how the team would play after their extended layoff. The Eagles were sluggish out of the gate and surrendered 2 goals in the first five minutes, however, Gibson quickly rang up a pair to tie the match. Cronin and Tedesco then added one apiece to give BC a 2-goal lead after the first. The offensive outburst continued in the second with Linehan's only two goals of his college career coming after a Smokey Kelleher marker. Despite the barrage of goals, Loyola wound;t go away and continued to penetrate the BC defense, scoring two in the middle period to keep the game within reach. Cronin's second goal of the evening gave BC a 4-goal lead in the third and, though the Warriors scored twice more before the final buzzer, BC ended their unfortunate season on a high-note.

Francis X. Sullivan served as team manager.

== Roster ==
No.	Nat.	Player	Class	Pos	Height	Weight	DoB	Hometown	Previous team
	(United States)	Cornelius P. Cronin (C)	Senior	D/RW				Cambridge, Massachusetts
	(United States)	John C. Drummond	Senior	G				Boston, Massachusetts
	(United States)	Joseph F. Fitzgerald	Junior	D				Boston, Massachusetts
	(United States)	Leon C. Fitzgerald	Freshman	G			1908-01-30	Weymouth, Massachusetts
	(United States)	Pierce J. Fitzgerald	Senior	C				Cambridge, Massachusetts
	(United States)	Lawrence W. Gibson	Freshman	C/LW/RW				Cambridge, Massachusetts
	(United States)	John F. Groden	Freshman	RW			1908-03-16	Watertown, Massachusetts
	(United States)	Edmund L. Kelleher	Freshman	C				West Roxbury, Massachusetts
	(United States)	John F. Kelleher	Junior	LW				Cambridge, Massachusetts
		Joseph D. Linehan	Senior	D/LW
		Lynch		D
	(United States)	R. Terrance McGovern	Senior	C				Brighton, Massachusetts
	(United States)	Arthur M. Morrissey	Sophomore	D				Medford, Massachusetts
	(United States)	Perley J. Payson	Freshman	C			1906-09-13	Quincy, Massachusetts
	(United States)	Nicholas P. Tedesco	Sophomore	D/RW				West Newton, Massachusetts

== Standings ==
1926–27 Eastern Collegiate ice hockey standings
	Intercollegiate							Overall					
	GP	W	L	T	Pct.	GF	GA	GP	W	L	T	GF	GA
Amherst	8	3	2	3	.563	9	9	8	3	2	3	9	9
Army	3	0	2	1	.167	5	13	4	0	3	1	7	20
Bates	8	4	3	1	.563	17	18	10	6	3	1	22	19
Boston College	2	1	1	0	.500	2	3	6	3	3	0	15	18
Boston University	7	2	4	1	.357	25	18	8	2	5	1	25	23
Bowdoin	8	3	5	0	.375	17	23	9	4	5	0	26	24
Brown	8	4	4	0	.500	16	26	8	4	4	0	16	26
Clarkson	9	8	1	0	.889	42	11	9	8	1	0	42	11
Colby	7	3	4	0	.429	16	12	7	3	4	0	16	12
Cornell	7	1	6	0	.143	10	23	7	1	6	0	10	23
Dartmouth	–	–	–	–	–	–	–	15	11	2	2	68	20
Hamilton	–	–	–	–	–	–	–	10	6	4	0	–	–
Harvard	8	7	0	1	.938	32	9	12	9	1	2	44	18
Massachusetts Agricultural	7	2	4	1	.357	5	10	7	2	4	1	5	10
Middlebury	6	6	0	0	1.000	25	7	6	6	0	0	25	7
MIT	8	3	4	1	.438	19	21	8	3	4	1	19	21
New Hampshire	6	6	0	0	1.000	22	7	6	6	0	0	22	7
Norwich	–	–	–	–	–	–	–	–	–	–	–	–	–
NYU	–	–	–	–	–	–	–	–	–	–	–	–	–
Princeton	6	2	4	0	.333	24	32	13	5	7	1	55	64
Providence	–	–	–	–	–	–	–	8	1	7	0	13	39
Rensselaer	–	–	–	–	–	–	–	3	0	2	1	–	–
St. Lawrence	–	–	–	–	–	–	–	7	3	4	0	–	–
Syracuse	–	–	–	–	–	–	–	–	–	–	–	–	–
Union	5	3	2	0	.600	18	14	5	3	2	0	18	14
Vermont	–	–	–	–	–	–	–	–	–	–	–	–	–
Williams	12	6	6	0	.500	38	40	12	6	6	0	38	40
Yale	12	8	3	1	.708	72	26	16	8	7	1	80	45
YMCA College	7	3	4	0	.429	16	19	7	3	4	0	16	19

== Schedule and results ==
Date	Opponent	Site	Result	Record
Regular Season
January 1	Toronto*	Boston Arena • Boston, Massachusetts	L 1–4	0–1–0
January 13	vs. University Club*	Boston Arena • Boston, Massachusetts	L 0–2	0–2–0
January 21	vs. MIT*	Boston Arena • Boston, Massachusetts	W 1–0	1–2–0
January 28	vs. Boston University*	Boston Arena • Boston, Massachusetts (Rivalry)	L 1–3	1–3–0
January 29	at Springfield Outing Club*	Eastern States Coliseum • Springfield, Massachusetts	W 4–3	2–3–0
February 25	Loyola*	Boston Arena • Boston, Massachusetts	W 8–6	3–3–0
*Non-conference game.

== Scoring statistics ==
Name	Position	Games	Goals
Tubber Cronin	D/RW	5	3
Larry Gibson	C/LW/RW	6	3
Smokey Kelleher	LW	-	3
Terry McGovern	C	6	2
Joe Linehan	D/C	-	2
Joe Fitzgerald	D	6	1
Nick Tedesco	D/RW	-	1
John Drummond	G	1	0
Ed Kelleher	C	1	0
Lynch	D	1	0
Perley Payson	C	1	0
Leon Fitzgerald	G	6	0
Perdy Fitzgerald	C	-	0
John Groden	RW	-	0
Art Morrissey	D	-	0
Total			15
