= 1926–27 Brown Bears men's ice hockey season =

- Conference: Independent
- Home ice: Rhode Island Auditorium

Record
- Overall: 4–4–0
- Home: 4–4–0

Coaches and captains
- Head coach: Jimmy Gardner
- Captain: George Fessenden

The 1926–27 Brown Bears men's ice hockey season was the 10th season of play for the program and first in 20 years. The Bears represented Brown University and were coached by Jimmy Gardner in his 1st season.

== Season ==
When Brown discontinued its ice hockey program in 1906, the primary reason given was the lack of a local indoor rink that would allow them to compete with the other ivy league schools. That changed with the construction of the Rhode Island Auditorium in early 1926. As the president of the Auditorium, I. A. Gammons, was a Brown alumnus, the school had little difficulty in securing the new building as a home rink. After the administration announced the return of varsity ice hockey, the school hired Jimmy Gardner as the team's first head coach. Gardner was well known in ice hockey circles and had been both a player and coach since 1899. He had been appointed as the first head coach of the Providence Reds and agreed to aid the Bears for their first season.

With consistent ice available for the Bears, the team was able practice regularly and work themselves into shape. However, as this was their first season in 20 years, the Bears did not schedule their first match until after the winter break. This gave coach Gardner plenty of time to build the team from scratch. The team had its first match tentatively scheduled for January 22 against Colby, however, that game was scrapped when the full slate was announced in early January. Instead, the team would open the season against Yale and Harvard, likely the two best college teams in the country.

Knowing that the team would be outgunned, coach Gardner stressed defense with the new team. However, most understood that the Bears would be a longshot to win either of the first two games. Their chances were made even worse when Josh Billings, a projected starting winger, was ruled academically ineligible just before the game. Despite their circumstances, Brown played well in its first game and did not look out of place against the Elis. Aside from their lack of experience, the chief problem for the Bears was a lack of available alternates. That caused the team to tire for brief moments in the game while the Bulldogs, who brought their full contingent of players on the trip, were quick to capitalize and score in bunches. Horace Partridge collected the only goal for the brunos.

About a week later, the Bears continued their run through the gauntlet and, by utilizing more reserve players in the match, were able to hold up better defensively. Billings was able to fix his academic issue and appear in the match, as did Fielding, Peters and Chase, the last of whom scored the lone goal for the Bears. Brown held Harvard to two goals through the first two periods but slipped a bit in the third. Though the final score was 1–5, the team was showing improvement early in the season. The following week, the team played their last game before the exam break and used the experience they had gained to win their first match of the year. The 2–1 victory over Bowdoin ended an 18-game losing streak that dated back to 1904.

The Bears had a few weeks to prepare themselves for New Hampshire. The extended time off did not appear to blunt the team's edge, however, they faced a Wildcat squad in the midst of a fine season. The Bears' offense was still learning how to play the game and could not keep up with the speedy forwards on the opposing side. Boston University arrived the following week and the Terriers got off to a fast start. The visitors scored twice in the first and controlled the pace of play, however, Brown began to fight back in the middle period. Gardiner cut into the lead a few minutes after intermission, while Partridge knotted the score moments later. An injury to Billings caused the attack to bog down for a while but a second marker from Partridge just before the bell gave Brown its first lead of the match. Billings was back on the ice in the third but the team nearly suffered a catastrophic injury when captain Ben Fessenden was struck in the face by a shot and knocked cold. The game was halted until he recovered and, after shaking off the cobwebs, he returned to guard the Bears' net until the end. After the second win of the season, Brown was supposed to have a rematch with UNH, however, upon their arrival in Durham, the team found the local rink buried under a foot of snow. The match was cancelled and Brown returned home.

After the forced cancellation, Brown had added a few more games to their schedule and would end the year with three games in March. First, the team played cross-town rival Providence, who were playing their first season of ice hockey. Brown took control of the match early and remained in charge for almost the entire game. Outside of a brief stretch in the second, the Bears faces no serious threat from the Friars and the two goals from Peters were enough to secure the win. The team had a bit of a letdown in their next match and the offense failed to show up against MIT. Fessenden gave a valiant effort in goal but was undone by a poor defensive effort and no finish from the forwards. The season finale was a rematch with Providence and the team looked to have the same effort as they had against MIT. Slow, sloppy play marred the first two periods and saw several penalties handed out to both sides. Billings netted the only goal during this time for Brown while Providence equaled them before the start of the third. In the last frame, the Bears appeared to recover some of their former strength and got a sure from Perrine when he scored twice in the first minutes of the period. Now with a lead, the team was able to play defense for the rest of the match and ride the steady goaltending from Fessenden to victory.

Robert F. Berwald Jr. served as team manager.

== Roster ==
No.	Nat.	Player	Class	Pos	Height	Weight	DoB	Hometown	Previous team
	(United States)	Haskell C. Billings	Sophomore	RW			1907-09-27	New York, New York
		Winfield H. Binns	Junior	LW
	(United States)	Vernon H. Chase	Junior	RW				East Lynn, Massachusetts
	(United States)	Howard F. Eastwood	Sophomore	RW			1908-03-16	Providence, Rhode Island
	(United States)	George N. Fessenden (C)	Senior	G				Providence, Rhode Island
	(United States)	Wendell S. Fielding	Senior	RW				Pawtucket, Rhode Island
	(United States)	Albert G. Gardiner Jr.	Sophomore	C/LW			1907-03-30
	(United States)	George M. Gross	Junior	D			1905-10-10	Providence, Rhode Island
	(United States)	Horace Partridge	Junior	C/RW				Brookline, Massachusetts
	(United States)	Earl W. Perrine	Sophomore	D				Hightstown, New Jersey
		William W. Peters	Sophomore	C

== Standings ==
1926–27 Eastern Collegiate ice hockey standings
	Intercollegiate							Overall					
	GP	W	L	T	Pct.	GF	GA	GP	W	L	T	GF	GA
Amherst	8	3	2	3	.563	9	9	8	3	2	3	9	9
Army	3	0	2	1	.167	5	13	4	0	3	1	7	20
Bates	8	4	3	1	.563	17	18	10	6	3	1	22	19
Boston College	2	1	1	0	.500	2	3	6	3	3	0	15	18
Boston University	7	2	4	1	.357	25	18	8	2	5	1	25	23
Bowdoin	8	3	5	0	.375	17	23	9	4	5	0	26	24
Brown	8	4	4	0	.500	16	26	8	4	4	0	16	26
Clarkson	9	8	1	0	.889	42	11	9	8	1	0	42	11
Colby	7	3	4	0	.429	16	12	7	3	4	0	16	12
Cornell	7	1	6	0	.143	10	23	7	1	6	0	10	23
Dartmouth	–	–	–	–	–	–	–	15	11	2	2	68	20
Hamilton	–	–	–	–	–	–	–	10	6	4	0	–	–
Harvard	8	7	0	1	.938	32	9	12	9	1	2	44	18
Massachusetts Agricultural	7	2	4	1	.357	5	10	7	2	4	1	5	10
Middlebury	6	6	0	0	1.000	25	7	6	6	0	0	25	7
MIT	8	3	4	1	.438	19	21	8	3	4	1	19	21
New Hampshire	6	6	0	0	1.000	22	7	6	6	0	0	22	7
Norwich	–	–	–	–	–	–	–	–	–	–	–	–	–
NYU	–	–	–	–	–	–	–	–	–	–	–	–	–
Princeton	6	2	4	0	.333	24	32	13	5	7	1	55	64
Providence	–	–	–	–	–	–	–	8	1	7	0	13	39
Rensselaer	–	–	–	–	–	–	–	3	0	2	1	–	–
St. Lawrence	–	–	–	–	–	–	–	7	3	4	0	–	–
Syracuse	–	–	–	–	–	–	–	–	–	–	–	–	–
Union	5	3	2	0	.600	18	14	5	3	2	0	18	14
Vermont	–	–	–	–	–	–	–	–	–	–	–	–	–
Williams	12	6	6	0	.500	38	40	12	6	6	0	38	40
Yale	12	8	3	1	.708	72	26	16	8	7	1	80	45
YMCA College	7	3	4	0	.429	16	19	7	3	4	0	16	19

== Schedule and results ==
Date	Opponent	Site	Result	Record
Regular Season
January 12	Yale*	Rhode Island Auditorium • Providence, Rhode Island	L 1–9 ^{†}	0–1–0
January 18	Harvard*	Rhode Island Auditorium • Providence, Rhode Island	L 1–5	0–2–0
January 22	Bowdoin*	Rhode Island Auditorium • Providence, Rhode Island	W 2–1	1–2–0
February 11	New Hampshire*	Rhode Island Auditorium • Providence, Rhode Island	L 2–4	1–3–0
February 16	Boston University*	Rhode Island Auditorium • Providence, Rhode Island	W 3–2	2–3–0
March 1	vs. Providence*	Rhode Island Auditorium • Providence, Rhode Island	W 4–1	3–3–0
March 5	MIT*	Rhode Island Auditorium • Providence, Rhode Island	L 0–3	3–4–0
March 11	vs. Providence*	Rhode Island Auditorium • Providence, Rhode Island	W 3–1	4–4–0
*Non-conference game.

† Historical records from both schools lists the game as being 1–9, however a Yale contemporary account has the score at 1–8.
