= 1926–27 Cornell Big Red men's ice hockey season =

Intercollegiate hockey season

- Home ice: Beebe Lake

Record
- Overall: 1–6–0
- Home: 1–4–0
- Road: 0–2–0

Coaches and captains
- Head coach: Nick Bawlf
- Captain: Phillips Hoyt

The 1926–27 Cornell Big Red men's ice hockey season was the 22nd season of play for the program. The teams was coached by Nick Bawlf in his 7th season.

== Season ==
There was both good and bad news for the team to begin the season. Beebe Lake froze early, enabling coach Bawlf to form the team at the beginning of December, but only two regulars were returning. To make matters worse, Benjamin Tilton, who had collected 70% of Cornell goals, had graduated and the new lineup would have to work hard to replace his production. On a positive note, Bubier, who was ineligible for the teal last season, returned to the squad for his senior year. He ended up scoring the team's first goal of the season in what was otherwise an uninspired performance.

The lineup was shuffled ahead of the second game and the team responded with a much better performance. The Big Red earned their second shutout against Syracuse in as many games. After a two-goal performance, Bubier was looking like an apt replacement for Tilton. In the team's game against Princeton he opened the scoring and when the teams ended the first period with a 1–1 tie there was hope that the Big Red might be able to win the match. The Tigers, however, had other ideas and scored eight consecutive goals to end the match with a convincing victory.

Once the team reformed after the exam break, there were several changed in the lineup. Burnett was brought in to start at right wing while O'Neill made an appearance on defense. Despite the changes, the team worked well together due in part to strenuous practices and they ended regulation with a 1–1 tie. In the second overtime, Barthen scored the go-ahead goal but Williams roared back with three unanswered before time ran out. Cornell wasn't expected to compete with Dartmouth, however, keeping the high-powered Indians to 5 goals was a decent result. Senior netminder Nash was singled out for his play and the team stayed in the game despite using just one substitute for the entire match.

continued shuffling of the lineup didn't work for the next game and Cornell dropped its first ever meeting with St. Lawrence. While the game was close, the Big Red's offense just could not get on track against the Saints. The team's offense remained dormant in their final game, scoring a single goal in another close loss. Cornell would not play as many as seven games in a season again until 1940.

== Roster ==
No.	Nat.	Player	Class	Pos	Height	Weight	DoB	Hometown	Previous team
	(United States)	Joseph Ayers	Senior	D				Easton, Pennsylvania
	(United States)	Charles Barthen	Senior	D				The Bronx, New York
	(United States)	Fritz Boesche	Senior	RW/D				Ithaca, New York
	(United States)	Henry Bubier	Senior	LW				Wellesley, Massachusetts
		Archie Burnett	Sophomore	RW
	(United States)	Earl Clark	Sophomore	RW/D				Utica, New York
	(United States)	Chuck Houghton	Senior	LW/RW				Ithaca, New York
	(United States)	Phillips Hoyt (C)	Senior	C				Indianapolis, Indiana
	(United States)	Ernest Kingsbury	Sophomore	RW/D				Ithaca, New York
	(United States)	Arthur Nash	Senior	G				Queens, New York
		Stanley Noble	Senior	D
		William O'Neil	Sophomore	D
		Andrew Sharp	Junior	LW/RW
	(United States)	James Taylor	Junior	D				Ithaca, New York
	(United States)	Carl Weagant	Sophomore	LW/RW				Wilkinsburg, Pennsylvania

== Standings ==
1926–27 Eastern Collegiate ice hockey standings
	Intercollegiate							Overall					
	GP	W	L	T	Pct.	GF	GA	GP	W	L	T	GF	GA
Amherst	8	3	2	3	.563	9	9	8	3	2	3	9	9
Army	3	0	2	1	.167	5	13	4	0	3	1	7	20
Bates	8	4	3	1	.563	17	18	10	6	3	1	22	19
Boston College	2	1	1	0	.500	2	3	6	3	3	0	15	18
Boston University	7	2	4	1	.357	25	18	8	2	5	1	25	23
Bowdoin	8	3	5	0	.375	17	23	9	4	5	0	26	24
Brown	8	4	4	0	.500	16	26	8	4	4	0	16	26
Clarkson	9	8	1	0	.889	42	11	9	8	1	0	42	11
Colby	7	3	4	0	.429	16	12	7	3	4	0	16	12
Cornell	7	1	6	0	.143	10	23	7	1	6	0	10	23
Dartmouth	–	–	–	–	–	–	–	15	11	2	2	68	20
Hamilton	–	–	–	–	–	–	–	10	6	4	0	–	–
Harvard	8	7	0	1	.938	32	9	12	9	1	2	44	18
Massachusetts Agricultural	7	2	4	1	.357	5	10	7	2	4	1	5	10
Middlebury	6	6	0	0	1.000	25	7	6	6	0	0	25	7
MIT	8	3	4	1	.438	19	21	8	3	4	1	19	21
New Hampshire	6	6	0	0	1.000	22	7	6	6	0	0	22	7
Norwich	–	–	–	–	–	–	–	–	–	–	–	–	–
NYU	–	–	–	–	–	–	–	–	–	–	–	–	–
Princeton	6	2	4	0	.333	24	32	13	5	7	1	55	64
Providence	–	–	–	–	–	–	–	8	1	7	0	13	39
Rensselaer	–	–	–	–	–	–	–	3	0	2	1	–	–
St. Lawrence	–	–	–	–	–	–	–	7	3	4	0	–	–
Syracuse	–	–	–	–	–	–	–	–	–	–	–	–	–
Union	5	3	2	0	.600	18	14	5	3	2	0	18	14
Vermont	–	–	–	–	–	–	–	–	–	–	–	–	–
Williams	12	6	6	0	.500	38	40	12	6	6	0	38	40
Yale	12	8	3	1	.708	72	26	16	8	7	1	80	45
YMCA College	7	3	4	0	.429	16	19	7	3	4	0	16	19

== Schedule and results ==
Date	Opponent	Site	Result	Record
Regular season
January 8	Clarkson*	Beebe Lake • Ithaca, New York	L 1–2	0–1–0
January 15	Syracuse*	Beebe Lake • Ithaca, New York	W 4–0	1–1–0
January 22	at Princeton*	Hobey Baker Memorial Rink • Princeton, New Jersey	L 1–8	1–2–0
February 4	Williams*	Beebe Lake • Ithaca, New York	L 2–4 ^{2OT}	1–3–0
February 7	Dartmouth*	Beebe Lake • Ithaca, New York	L 0–5	1–4–0
February 19	St. Lawrence*	Beebe Lake • Ithaca, New York	L 1–2	1–5–0
February 26	at Hamilton*	Russell Sage Rink • Clinton, New York	L 1–2	1–6–0
*Non-conference game.

== Scoring Statistics ==
Name	Position	Games	Goals
Henry Bubier	LW	7	4
Phillips Hoyt	C	7	2
Burnett	RW	2	1
Charles Barthen	D	4	1
Earl Clark	RW/D	5	1
Chuck Houghton	LW/RW	7	1
Noble	D	1	0
Joseph Ayers	D	2	0
O'Neill	D	2	0
James Taylor	D	2	0
Fritz Boesche	RW/D	3	0
Carl Weagant	LW/RW	3	0
Ernest Kingsbury	RW/D	4	0
Sharp	LW/RW	6	0
Arthur Nash	G	7	0
Total			10

Note: Assists were not recorded as a statistic.
