= 1926–27 Army Cadets men's ice hockey season =

- Conference: Independent
- Home ice: Stuart Rink

Record
- Overall: 0–3–1
- Home: 0–2–1
- Road: 0–1–0

Coaches and captains
- Head coach: Ray Marchand
- Captain: Mark Lewis

The 1926–27 Army Cadets men's ice hockey season was the 24th season of play for the program. The team was coached by Ray Marchand in his 4th season.

== Season ==
With more than half of the previous year's team having graduated, coach Marchand had his work cut out for him in rebuilding the team. With 12 games on the schedule, Army was hoping to improve upon their poor record from '26, however, the weather was particularly harsh this season. High temperatures and inclement conditions, including snow, rain and hail, ruined what could have been a decent season for the Cadets. In the end, Army had to cancel 8 games.

With so many new faces, Army was outplayed in their first game of the season and soundly beaten by MIT, 0–7. Delays and cancellations forced the team to the sidelines for over three weeks before their next match but even through the difficulties, they performed well against one of the top teams in the country. While the ice was soft, the Cadets weren't and Army recovered from an early 1–3 deficit to tie Clarkson by the end of the second period. McNamara gave the team a lead in the final frame but they couldn't stop Tech from equaling and the two needed overtime to settle the match. The two fought furiously to score for the first 4 minutes of the extra period, unfortunately it was Clarkson who netted a goal. The Greens then pulled back and played defense for the final 6 minutes, preventing Army from getting a good shot at tying the game. Amherst arrived in town a week later and the two played an even game. they were so equally matched that after 2 overtime periods neither could net a winner so they had to settle for a tie.

For Army's final game of the year, they travelled north to Kingston to face the Royal Military College Paladins. Their Canadian counterparts kept their series winning streak alive with another easy victory, though Army did play better than the final score would indicate.

This season had one of the fewest number of games for Army's hockey team in its history and would serve as an impetus for the academy to build a more permanent home for the program.

Joseph Cox served as the team's manager with John Oakes as his assistant.

== Roster ==
No.	Nat.	Player	Class	Pos	Height	Weight	DoB	Hometown	Previous team
	(United States)	William W. Browning	Junior	G			1904-07-29	Brooklyn, New York
	(United States)	Maurice F. Daly	Senior	D			1901-07-20	Hartford, Connecticut
	(United States)	Paul D. Harkins	Sophomore				1904-05-15	Boston, Massachusetts
	(United States)	Mark K. Lewis Jr. (C)	Senior	G			1902-10-29	Maple Shade, New Jersey
	(United States)	Roy E. Lindquist	Freshman				1907-02-18	West Newton, Massachusetts
	(United States)	Andrew T. McNamara	Junior	F			1905-05-14	East Providence, Rhode Island
	(United States)	Tito C. Moscatelli	Junior	F			1904-09-04	Cagli, Italy
	(United States)	Everett D. Peddicord	Junior				1905-02-21	Baltimore, Maryland
	(United States)	John A. Sawyer	Junior	F			1904-03-21	Elizabeth, New Jersey
	(United States)	Samuel J. Simonton	Senior				1902-03-13	Allentown, Pennsylvania
	(United States)	Kenneth E. Thiebaud	Senior	D			1904-05-08	Saint Paul, Minnesota
	(United States)	Robert M. Wohlforth	Senior				1904-02-25	Spring Lake, New Jersey

== Standings ==
1926–27 Eastern Collegiate ice hockey standings
	Intercollegiate							Overall					
	GP	W	L	T	Pct.	GF	GA	GP	W	L	T	GF	GA
Amherst	8	3	2	3	.563	9	9	8	3	2	3	9	9
Army	3	0	2	1	.167	5	13	4	0	3	1	7	20
Bates	8	4	3	1	.563	17	18	10	6	3	1	22	19
Boston College	2	1	1	0	.500	2	3	6	3	3	0	15	18
Boston University	7	2	4	1	.357	25	18	8	2	5	1	25	23
Bowdoin	8	3	5	0	.375	17	23	9	4	5	0	26	24
Brown	8	4	4	0	.500	16	26	8	4	4	0	16	26
Clarkson	9	8	1	0	.889	42	11	9	8	1	0	42	11
Colby	7	3	4	0	.429	16	12	7	3	4	0	16	12
Cornell	7	1	6	0	.143	10	23	7	1	6	0	10	23
Dartmouth	–	–	–	–	–	–	–	15	11	2	2	68	20
Hamilton	–	–	–	–	–	–	–	10	6	4	0	–	–
Harvard	8	7	0	1	.938	32	9	12	9	1	2	44	18
Massachusetts Agricultural	7	2	4	1	.357	5	10	7	2	4	1	5	10
Middlebury	6	6	0	0	1.000	25	7	6	6	0	0	25	7
MIT	8	3	4	1	.438	19	21	8	3	4	1	19	21
New Hampshire	6	6	0	0	1.000	22	7	6	6	0	0	22	7
Norwich	–	–	–	–	–	–	–	–	–	–	–	–	–
NYU	–	–	–	–	–	–	–	–	–	–	–	–	–
Princeton	6	2	4	0	.333	24	32	13	5	7	1	55	64
Providence	–	–	–	–	–	–	–	8	1	7	0	13	39
Rensselaer	–	–	–	–	–	–	–	3	0	2	1	–	–
St. Lawrence	–	–	–	–	–	–	–	7	3	4	0	–	–
Syracuse	–	–	–	–	–	–	–	–	–	–	–	–	–
Union	5	3	2	0	.600	18	14	5	3	2	0	18	14
Vermont	–	–	–	–	–	–	–	–	–	–	–	–	–
Williams	12	6	6	0	.500	38	40	12	6	6	0	38	40
Yale	12	8	3	1	.708	72	26	16	8	7	1	80	45
YMCA College	7	3	4	0	.429	16	19	7	3	4	0	16	19

== Schedule and results ==
Date	Opponent	Site	Result	Record
Regular Season
January 8	MIT*	Stuart Rink • West Point, New York	L 0–7	0–1–0
January 29	Clarkson*	Stuart Rink • West Point, New York	L 4–5 ^{OT}	0–2–0
February 5	Amherst*	Stuart Rink • West Point, New York	T 1–1 ^{2OT}	0–2–1
February 19	at Royal Military College*	Kingston, Ontario	L 2–7	0–3–1
*Non-conference game.
