= 1926–27 YMCA College Maroons men's ice hockey season =

- Conference: Independent
- Home ice: Eastern States Coliseum

Record
- Overall: 3–4–0
- Home: 1–2–0
- Road: 2–2–0

Coaches and captains
- Head coach: Frank E. Carroll
- Captain: Earle Wilson

The 1926–27 YMCA College Maroons men's ice hockey season was the 20th season of play for the program.

== Season ==
After being dormant for two years, the ice hockey program at YMCA College was revived. The primary factor in this was securing an arrangement with the operators of the Eastern States Coliseum to allow the team access to consistent ice for the first time in its history. Within a month of the program's return, the Maroons were invited to join a new circuit of teams called the New England Intercollegiate Hockey League that was arranged by schools like Boston College and Boston University. The plan was to use the stable rinks in Springfield, Boston and Providence for league games to help provide a consistent number of games for the individual programs.

Practice began in early December, however, as the team did not yet had a head coach, two players from the local professional team agreed to conduct the training in the interim. Unfortunately, those players were soon busy with other duties and a series of different men were in charge of the Springfield training. Unsurprisingly, the team did not demonstrate a great deal of teamwork in their first game. However, the offense was still able to produce and scored 4 goals in their return loss. By the following week the team was showing signs of improvement, however, they faced a much tougher challenge in Williams. The Maroons were outplayed through the entire match and could hardly get any offense going.

Frank Carroll was brought in ahead of the third game for the Maroons and the team responded well to his steadying force, particularly on the back end. The defense was much more effective against Amherst than it had been in either of its first two games and led YMCA to its first win in over three years. The team then took an extended rest during the exam period and returned with a rematch against Providence. Almost as if to prove how far the Maroons had come under Carroll, the team equaled its 4-goal output but limited the Friars to just a single goal. YMCA took an overnight train north and faced New Hampshire the following day. The Maroons fell but had a chance to get revenge 4 days later at home. However, the result didn't change and YMCA was guaranteed to finish with a losing record after its 4th loss.

The final match of the year came on the road against Rensselaer and saw the team put forth their best effort of the season. The defense was stifling and allowed just 5 shots to find their way to Lang, who stopped each attempt. Johnson and Wilson scored to give the team the win and set them up well for the following season.

Kenneth Crump served as team manager.

== Roster ==
No.	Nat.	Player	Class	Pos	Height	Weight	DoB	Hometown	Previous team
	(United States)	Paul G. Crowell	Sophomore	D			1904-01-20	Concord, New Hampshire
	(United States)	George E. Flint	Sophomore	C				Melrose Highlands, Massachusetts
	(United States)	Eldon W. Heartz	Senior	G				Concord, New Hampshire
	(United States)	William L. Johnson	Sophomore	RW				Trenton, New Jersey
	(Canada)	William E. Lang	Junior	G				St. Thomas, Ontario
	(Canada)	Britton C. McCabe	Senior					Toronto, Ontario
	(United States)	William H. Pendleton	Junior					Springfield, Massachusetts
	(United States)	George H. Weir	Senior	LW				Palmer, Massachusetts
	(Canada)	Earle M. Wilson (C)	Sophomore	D				Sydney, Nova Scotia

== Standings ==
1926–27 Eastern Collegiate ice hockey standings
	Intercollegiate							Overall					
	GP	W	L	T	Pct.	GF	GA	GP	W	L	T	GF	GA
Amherst	8	3	2	3	.563	9	9	8	3	2	3	9	9
Army	3	0	2	1	.167	5	13	4	0	3	1	7	20
Bates	8	4	3	1	.563	17	18	10	6	3	1	22	19
Boston College	2	1	1	0	.500	2	3	6	3	3	0	15	18
Boston University	7	2	4	1	.357	25	18	8	2	5	1	25	23
Bowdoin	8	3	5	0	.375	17	23	9	4	5	0	26	24
Brown	8	4	4	0	.500	16	26	8	4	4	0	16	26
Clarkson	9	8	1	0	.889	42	11	9	8	1	0	42	11
Colby	7	3	4	0	.429	16	12	7	3	4	0	16	12
Cornell	7	1	6	0	.143	10	23	7	1	6	0	10	23
Dartmouth	–	–	–	–	–	–	–	15	11	2	2	68	20
Hamilton	–	–	–	–	–	–	–	10	6	4	0	–	–
Harvard	8	7	0	1	.938	32	9	12	9	1	2	44	18
Massachusetts Agricultural	7	2	4	1	.357	5	10	7	2	4	1	5	10
Middlebury	6	6	0	0	1.000	25	7	6	6	0	0	25	7
MIT	8	3	4	1	.438	19	21	8	3	4	1	19	21
New Hampshire	6	6	0	0	1.000	22	7	6	6	0	0	22	7
Norwich	–	–	–	–	–	–	–	–	–	–	–	–	–
NYU	–	–	–	–	–	–	–	–	–	–	–	–	–
Princeton	6	2	4	0	.333	24	32	13	5	7	1	55	64
Providence	–	–	–	–	–	–	–	8	1	7	0	13	39
Rensselaer	–	–	–	–	–	–	–	3	0	2	1	–	–
St. Lawrence	–	–	–	–	–	–	–	7	3	4	0	–	–
Syracuse	–	–	–	–	–	–	–	–	–	–	–	–	–
Union	5	3	2	0	.600	18	14	5	3	2	0	18	14
Vermont	–	–	–	–	–	–	–	–	–	–	–	–	–
Williams	12	6	6	0	.500	38	40	12	6	6	0	38	40
Yale	12	8	3	1	.708	72	26	16	8	7	1	80	45
YMCA College	7	3	4	0	.429	16	19	7	3	4	0	16	19

== Schedule and results ==
Date	Opponent	Site	Result	Record
Regular Season
January 6	Providence*	Eastern States Coliseum • Springfield, Massachusetts	L 4–6	0–1–0
January 12	at Williams*	Sage Hall Rink • Williamstown, Massachusetts	L 1–6	0–2–0
January 21	Amherst*	Eastern States Coliseum • Springfield, Massachusetts	W 3–1	1–2–0
February 4	at Providence*	Rhode Island Auditorium • Providence, Rhode Island	W 4–1	2–2–0
February 5	at New Hampshire*	UNH Ice Rink • Durham, New Hampshire	L 1–3	2–3–0
February 9	New Hampshire*	Eastern States Coliseum • Springfield, Massachusetts	L 1–2	2–4–0
February 12	at Rensselaer*	RPI Rink • Troy, New York	W 2–0	3–4–0
*Non-conference game.
