= 1926–27 Clarkson Golden Knights men's ice hockey season =

Intercollegiate hockey season

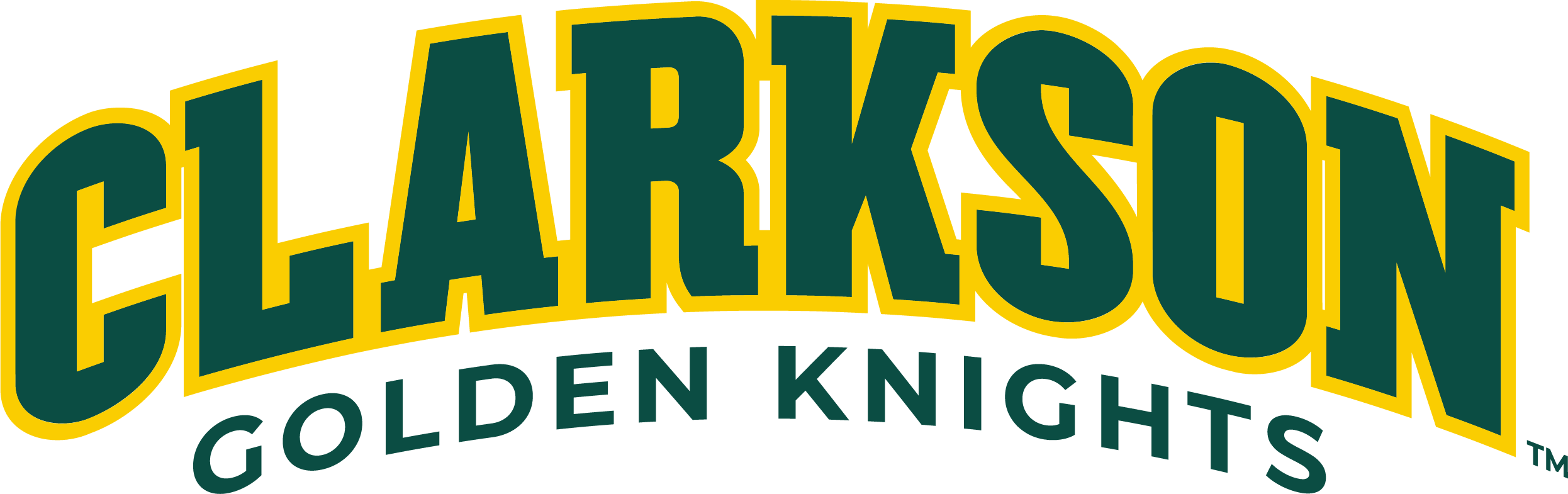
- Home ice: Ives Park

Record
- Overall: 8–1–0
- Home: 3–0–0
- Road: 5–1–0

Coaches and captains
- Head coach: Gordon Croskery
- Captain: Ray Wayland

The 1926–27 Clarkson Golden Knights men's ice hockey season was the 7th season of play for the program. The team was coached by Gordon Croskery in his 4th season.

== Season ==
The potential that Clarkson had shown in the second half of last season was fully realized this year. With all of their principle players returning and several more being welcomed in, the Golden Knights got off to a hot start against Cornell. "String" Macartney opened the scoring while new entry Harrison Heintzman netted the game-winner at the end of the second period. The team was short-handed when they met Hamilton a week later, missing both Dion and Heintzman, but gave the Continentals a fight. The teams battled to a 2–2 draw after 60 minutes but Tech fell in the extra session.

The team was back at full strength for the following match, a continuation of their brand-new rivalry with St. Lawrence, and Clarkson really let the Larries have it. The Knights beat the Saints 10–1 with captain Wayland scoring a hat-trick from the blueline. The team then headed to Brooklyn to face NYU in their opponent's first game in 14 years. The Violets' goaltender, Vye, put up a tremendous effort, limiting Clarkson to just 3 goals in the game. The NYU offense, however, could only muster 3 shots on Klube for the entire match and Tech easily shut out the Violets. On their way home, Clarkson stopped in West Point and received a hard test from Army. The Knights got out to an early lead but the Cadets tied the game at 3-all in the second. After exchanging goals in the third, Clarkson played its second overtime game of the season. Northup netted the go-ahead goal 2 minutes into the frame and then the entire team played defense for the remainder of the 10-minute session to secure their fourth win on the year.

Coach Croskery had more than a week to work with the team before their next match and he had them in fine form when they hosted Syracuse. The Orange had won both of the previous games between the two, but Clarkson wouldn't let that trend continue; Tech swamped Syracuse in front of about 800 fans at home to the tune of 8–0. Wayland ended up with his second hat-trick on the year but Heintzman finished one goal better. Their third and final home game of the year occurred over that weekend when Vermont arrived in town. The game was slowed by poor ice conditions but Tech was still able to pump 5 goals into the cage, easily carrying the match.

Clarkson rounded out its season with two rematch games over the next couple of weeks. The first was at Syracuse, where the teams were limited to three 15-minute periods, but Tech continued their winning streak with a solid 4–1 victory. The second was against St. Lawrence and the Knights faced a far tougher task than they had the first time around. The Saints' defense had vastly improved over the course of the season and they held Clarkson off of the scoresheet for the first half of the match. Fortunately for Clarkson, their defense was just as impenetrable. The stronger legs of the Knights showed as the game went on and eventually they broke through. "Chesty" Northup broke the tie in the second and then added another in the third, allowing Clarkson to earn its seventh-consecutive win and third shutout on the year.

With much of the team returning for next season, there were now high expectations for the Knights.

== Roster ==
No.	Nat.	Player	Class	Pos	Height	Weight	DoB	Hometown	Previous team
	(Canada)	Alfred M. Dion	Sophomore	F				Ottawa, Ontario
	(Canada)	W. Harrison Heintzman	Freshman	F				Arnprior, Ontario
	(United States)	John O. Klube	Senior	G				Syracuse, New York
	(United States)	Ernest W. Longton	Sophomore	F				Clayton, New York
	(United States)	William N. Macartney	Senior	D				Fort Covington, New York
	(United States)	Lloyd J. Northrup	Senior	F				Alexandria Bay, New York
	(United States)	Harold J. Petrie	Sophomore	F				Morristown, New York
	(Canada)	Raymond J. Wayland (C)	Junior	D				Montreal, Quebec

== Standings ==
1926–27 Eastern Collegiate ice hockey standings
	Intercollegiate							Overall					
	GP	W	L	T	Pct.	GF	GA	GP	W	L	T	GF	GA
Amherst	8	3	2	3	.563	9	9	8	3	2	3	9	9
Army	3	0	2	1	.167	5	13	4	0	3	1	7	20
Bates	8	4	3	1	.563	17	18	10	6	3	1	22	19
Boston College	2	1	1	0	.500	2	3	6	3	3	0	15	18
Boston University	7	2	4	1	.357	25	18	8	2	5	1	25	23
Bowdoin	8	3	5	0	.375	17	23	9	4	5	0	26	24
Brown	8	4	4	0	.500	16	26	8	4	4	0	16	26
Clarkson	9	8	1	0	.889	42	11	9	8	1	0	42	11
Colby	7	3	4	0	.429	16	12	7	3	4	0	16	12
Cornell	7	1	6	0	.143	10	23	7	1	6	0	10	23
Dartmouth	–	–	–	–	–	–	–	15	11	2	2	68	20
Hamilton	–	–	–	–	–	–	–	10	6	4	0	–	–
Harvard	8	7	0	1	.938	32	9	12	9	1	2	44	18
Massachusetts Agricultural	7	2	4	1	.357	5	10	7	2	4	1	5	10
Middlebury	6	6	0	0	1.000	25	7	6	6	0	0	25	7
MIT	8	3	4	1	.438	19	21	8	3	4	1	19	21
New Hampshire	6	6	0	0	1.000	22	7	6	6	0	0	22	7
Norwich	–	–	–	–	–	–	–	–	–	–	–	–	–
NYU	–	–	–	–	–	–	–	–	–	–	–	–	–
Princeton	6	2	4	0	.333	24	32	13	5	7	1	55	64
Providence	–	–	–	–	–	–	–	8	1	7	0	13	39
Rensselaer	–	–	–	–	–	–	–	3	0	2	1	–	–
St. Lawrence	–	–	–	–	–	–	–	7	3	4	0	–	–
Syracuse	–	–	–	–	–	–	–	–	–	–	–	–	–
Union	5	3	2	0	.600	18	14	5	3	2	0	18	14
Vermont	–	–	–	–	–	–	–	–	–	–	–	–	–
Williams	12	6	6	0	.500	38	40	12	6	6	0	38	40
Yale	12	8	3	1	.708	72	26	16	8	7	1	80	45
YMCA College	7	3	4	0	.429	16	19	7	3	4	0	16	19

== Schedule and results ==
Date	Opponent	Site	Result	Record
Regular season
January 8	at Cornell*	Beebe Lake • Ithaca, New York	W 2–1	1–0–0
January 15	at Hamilton*	Russell Sage Rink • Clinton, New York	L 2–3 ^{OT}	1–1–0
January 22	St. Lawrence*	Ives Park • Potsdam, New York	W 10–1	2–1–0
January 28	at NYU*	Brooklyn Ice Palace • Brooklyn, New York	W 3–0	3–1–0
January 29	at Army*	Stuart Rink • West Point, New York	W 5–4 ^{OT}	4–1–0
February 10	Syracuse*	Ives Park • Potsdam, New York	W 8–0	5–1–0
February 12	Vermont*	Ives Park • Potsdam, New York	W 5–1	6–1–0
February 19	at Syracuse*	Syracuse, New York	W 4–1	7–1–0
February 26	at St. Lawrence*	Weeks Field Rink • Canton, New York	W 3–0	8–1–0
*Non-conference game.

== Scoring Statistics ==
Name	Position	Games	Goals
Harrison Heintzman	RW	8	11
Ray Wayland	D	9	10
Fred Dion	C	8	8
Lloyd Northup	LW	9	8
Bill Macartney	D	9	5
Harold Petrie	C	3	0
Ernest Longton	LW/RW	7	0
John Klube	G	9	0
Total			42

Note: Assists were not recorded as a statistic.

== Goaltending statistics ==
Name	Games	Minutes	Wins	Losses	Ties	Goals against	Shut outs	GAA
John Klube	9	545	8	1	0	11	3	1.21

Note: GAA is based upon 60 minutes per game.
