= 1926–27 Harvard Crimson men's ice hockey season =

College ice hockey season

Eastern Intercollegiate Champion
- Conference: Independent
- Home ice: Boston Arena

Record
- Overall: 9–1–2
- Home: 4–1–2
- Road: 2–0–0
- Neutral: 3–0–0

Coaches and captains
- Head coach: Edward Bigelow
- Captain: William Ellison

The 1926–27 Harvard Crimson men's ice hockey season was the 29th season of play for the program.

== Season ==
Before the season began, Harvard made a decision to end their annual contests against Princeton. The two teams had played one another, often multiple times, every year since 1901 with exception of the 1918 campaign (due to World War I). The problem was that Princeton hadn't challenged for a league championship since before the War, which was also the last time they had beaten Harvard in the season series. Harvard was also able to fill the gap in their schedule with the return of Brown after a 20-year hiatus.

A bigger issue that Harvard had to contend with was a new rule limiting each team to just 12 players per game. While that didn't affect most programs, the Crimson had been routinely using many alternates during their games, resulting in 15 or more players in some contests. Regardless of the new limitations, Harvard began the season well. After a solid win over MIT the team played three games against Canadian colleges and finished with a split decision, a difficult task considering the quality of their opponents. Unfortunately, the team also lost sophomore forward Henry Crosby to appendicitis just before the second Toronto game.

After proving their international mettle, Harvard played its first ever western opponent when it hosted Notre Dame. The Crimson dominated the Irish 7–0 but little beyond that could be established from the game as Notre Dame wasn't a particularly strong team that season. Harvard avenged a loss from the year before with a hard-fought victory over Boston University then entered their showdown against Yale with a chance at another intercollegiate title. The Crimson offense overpowered the Elis in the first game, and after securing a season-series win over Dartmouth with a tie, Harvard finished the season at the newly-refurbished New Haven Arena. Harvard built a 2-goal lead and then played their typical stifling defense to earn a 2–1 win and finish the season undefeated against collegiate opponents.

A day after the victory, head coach Edward Bigelow announced that he was resigning from his position to devote himself fully to his business career. Though his tenure was short, few could claim as much success as Bigelow did with two intercollegiate championships and a record of 25–8–2 (22–3–1 against collegiate opponents).

== Roster ==
No.	Nat.	Player	Class	Pos	Height	Weight	DoB	Hometown	Previous team
		F. Weston W. Adams	Junior	G
	(United States)	John P. Chase	Junior	C/LW			1906-06-12	Milton, Massachusetts
		Eben C. Clark	Graduate	D
		Clement D. Coady	Senior	D
		John B. Durant	Senior	LW/RW
		William P. Ellison (C)	Senior	D
		Courtland S. Gross	Senior	LW
		Nathaniel Hamlen	Senior	RW
		Willard Howard	Senior	D
		Joseph Morill Jr.	Junior	G
		Richard S. Scott	Senior	C/LW
		Malcolm N. Stanley	Sophomore	LW/RW/D
		John Tudor	Sophomore	LW
		Cecil I. Wylde	Senior	D
		Isadore Zarakov	Senior	RW

== Standings ==
1926–27 Eastern Collegiate ice hockey standings
	Intercollegiate							Overall					
	GP	W	L	T	Pct.	GF	GA	GP	W	L	T	GF	GA
Amherst	8	3	2	3	.563	9	9	8	3	2	3	9	9
Army	3	0	2	1	.167	5	13	4	0	3	1	7	20
Bates	8	4	3	1	.563	17	18	10	6	3	1	22	19
Boston College	2	1	1	0	.500	2	3	6	3	3	0	15	18
Boston University	7	2	4	1	.357	25	18	8	2	5	1	25	23
Bowdoin	8	3	5	0	.375	17	23	9	4	5	0	26	24
Brown	8	4	4	0	.500	16	26	8	4	4	0	16	26
Clarkson	9	8	1	0	.889	42	11	9	8	1	0	42	11
Colby	7	3	4	0	.429	16	12	7	3	4	0	16	12
Cornell	7	1	6	0	.143	10	23	7	1	6	0	10	23
Dartmouth	–	–	–	–	–	–	–	15	11	2	2	68	20
Hamilton	–	–	–	–	–	–	–	10	6	4	0	–	–
Harvard	8	7	0	1	.938	32	9	12	9	1	2	44	18
Massachusetts Agricultural	7	2	4	1	.357	5	10	7	2	4	1	5	10
Middlebury	6	6	0	0	1.000	25	7	6	6	0	0	25	7
MIT	8	3	4	1	.438	19	21	8	3	4	1	19	21
New Hampshire	6	6	0	0	1.000	22	7	6	6	0	0	22	7
Norwich	–	–	–	–	–	–	–	–	–	–	–	–	–
NYU	–	–	–	–	–	–	–	–	–	–	–	–	–
Princeton	6	2	4	0	.333	24	32	13	5	7	1	55	64
Providence	–	–	–	–	–	–	–	8	1	7	0	13	39
Rensselaer	–	–	–	–	–	–	–	3	0	2	1	–	–
St. Lawrence	–	–	–	–	–	–	–	7	3	4	0	–	–
Syracuse	–	–	–	–	–	–	–	–	–	–	–	–	–
Union	5	3	2	0	.600	18	14	5	3	2	0	18	14
Vermont	–	–	–	–	–	–	–	–	–	–	–	–	–
Williams	12	6	6	0	.500	38	40	12	6	6	0	38	40
Yale	12	8	3	1	.708	72	26	16	8	7	1	80	45
YMCA College	7	3	4	0	.429	16	19	7	3	4	0	16	19

== Schedule and results ==
Date	Opponent	Site	Result	Record
Regular Season
December 10	vs. MIT*	Boston Arena • Boston, Massachusetts	W 5–1	1–0–0
December 29	McGill*	Boston Arena • Boston, Massachusetts	L 3–4 ^{OT}	1–1–0
December 31	vs. Toronto*	Madison Square Garden • Manhattan, New York	W 4–3	2–1–0
January 3	Toronto*	Boston Arena • Boston, Massachusetts	T 1–1	2–1–1
January 7	Notre Dame*	Boston Arena • Boston, Massachusetts	W 7–0	3–1–1
January 12	Dartmouth*	Boston Arena • Boston, Massachusetts	W 4–2	4–1–1
January 18	at Brown*	Rhode Island Auditorium • Providence, Rhode Island	W 5–1	5–1–1
January 26	vs. Boston University*	Boston Arena • Boston, Massachusetts	W 1–0 ^{OT}	6–1–1
February 10	Laval*	Boston Arena • Boston, Massachusetts	W 4–1	7–1–1
February 19	Yale*	Boston Arena • Boston, Massachusetts (Rivalry)	W 6–2	8–1–1
February 23	Dartmouth*	Boston Arena • Boston, Massachusetts	T 2–2 ^{3OT}	8–1–2
February 27	at Yale	New Haven Arena • New Haven, Connecticut (Rivalry)	W 2–1	9–1–2
*Non-conference game.
