= 1926–27 New Hampshire Wildcats men's ice hockey season =

- Conference: Independent
- Home ice: UNH Ice Rink

Record
- Overall: 6–0–0
- Home: 3–0–0
- Road: 3–0–0

Coaches and captains
- Head coach: Ernest Christensen
- Captain: Warren Percival

The 1926–27 New Hampshire Wildcats men's ice hockey season was the 3rd season of play for the program. The Wildcats represented the University of New Hampshire and were coached by Ernest Christensen in his 2nd season.

== Season ==
With decent weather in December, the newly rechristened 'Wildcats' were able to get a jump on the season and set up their rink in time for a game with Bates in early January. Howard Crins, a new addition to the team, combined with captain Percival to make a potent offensive duo. The two combined for 3 goals in the opening game with Reinhart netting the other. The constant offensive pressure brought by the Wildcats prevented the Bobcats from doing much damage, allowing the new setup on the back end to ease into the season. A few days later, Bowdoin was in town and gave New Hampshire a fight for most of the 60-minute match. After surrendering the first goal, the Wildcats used their speed to generate two goals off of the rush in the first period. Ide added a pair late but, with Rogers making 27 saves on 28 shots, they weren't needed for the team to get its second victory.

After a solid start, the team had several weeks off before their next match. It wasn't until early February that YMCA College arrived but the team didn't appear to have lost any of its edge. The defensive wall put up by Vatter and Chandler was very effective throughout the match and allowed the Wildcats to dominate the shot totals. It was only due to the brilliant goaltending of the Springfield netminder that the score remained close. However, with Percival and Ide combining for three goals, the team got enough offense to carry the day.

Prior to the winter carnival, the Wildcats went on a jaunt through New England, playing 3 games in 4 days. First, they met YMCA College for a return game and opened with a flurry. After Chandler scored his first of the season, the home team tied the match. Percival put UNH back into the lead before the end of the first but the rest of the game was a defensive struggle. No more goals were scored by either side and the Wildcats remained undefeated. Two days later, the team faced Brown for the opening leg of a home-and-home series. Percival and Crins each scored twice to topple the Bears in one of the best games UNH played all season. The squad remained in town for another day to face Providence. The first period was a tightly fought battle but the Wildcats took over in the final two innings. Percival continued to lead the offense with two goals on the night while Vatter (2) and Dearington each provided their first markers of the year.

The team returned home for the winter carnival and eagerly awaited Brown's arrival. Though the brunos made the trip the game had to be cancelled when the ice was covered by nearly a foot of snow. Instead, the team wrapped up its season a few days later with an exhibition match against an alumni team. By finishing the year with an undefeated record, the Wildcats had a claim on the small school intercollegiate championship. This unofficial crown was ostensibly available for colleges or universities that were not in direct competition with the likes of Harvard and Yale.

Harlan C. Jordan served as team manager.

== Roster ==
No.	Nat.	Player	Class	Pos	Height	Weight	DoB	Hometown	Previous team
	(United States)	Roland F. Chandler	Junior	D			1905-05-30	Winchester, New Hampshire
	(United States)	Howard A. Crins	Sophomore	LW/RW			1904-08-30	Providence, Rhode Island
	(United States)	Searls Dearington	Senior	LW			1903-04-04	Thompson, Connecticut
	(United States)	Leo F. Garvey	Senior	RW				Dover, New Hampshire
	(United States)	John K. Hatch	Sophomore	D			1907-08-16	Dover, New Hampshire
	(United States)	Nicholas P. Ide	Senior	LW/RW			1903-02-28	Wayland, Massachusetts
	(United States)	Everett B. Moore	Sophomore	D			1907-03-28	Keene, New Hampshire
	(United States)	Warren E. Percival (C)	Junior	C			1904-07-21	Gorham, New Hampshire
	(United States)	Alvin R. Reinhart	Sophomore	LW/RW			1907-06-23	Medfield, Massachusetts
	(United States)	John E. Rogers	Junior	G				Everett, Massachusetts
	(United States)	Edwin B. Vatter	Senior	D			1904-12-16	Wayland, Massachusetts
	(United States)	Carl G. Wendelin	Sophomore	D			1905-09-05	Concord, New Hampshire
	(United States)	Norman H. Young	Sophomore	C			1905-01-22	Portsmouth, New Hampshire

== Standings ==
1926–27 Eastern Collegiate ice hockey standings
	Intercollegiate							Overall					
	GP	W	L	T	Pct.	GF	GA	GP	W	L	T	GF	GA
Amherst	8	3	2	3	.563	9	9	8	3	2	3	9	9
Army	3	0	2	1	.167	5	13	4	0	3	1	7	20
Bates	8	4	3	1	.563	17	18	10	6	3	1	22	19
Boston College	2	1	1	0	.500	2	3	6	3	3	0	15	18
Boston University	7	2	4	1	.357	25	18	8	2	5	1	25	23
Bowdoin	8	3	5	0	.375	17	23	9	4	5	0	26	24
Brown	8	4	4	0	.500	16	26	8	4	4	0	16	26
Clarkson	9	8	1	0	.889	42	11	9	8	1	0	42	11
Colby	7	3	4	0	.429	16	12	7	3	4	0	16	12
Cornell	7	1	6	0	.143	10	23	7	1	6	0	10	23
Dartmouth	–	–	–	–	–	–	–	15	11	2	2	68	20
Hamilton	–	–	–	–	–	–	–	10	6	4	0	–	–
Harvard	8	7	0	1	.938	32	9	12	9	1	2	44	18
Massachusetts Agricultural	7	2	4	1	.357	5	10	7	2	4	1	5	10
Middlebury	6	6	0	0	1.000	25	7	6	6	0	0	25	7
MIT	8	3	4	1	.438	19	21	8	3	4	1	19	21
New Hampshire	6	6	0	0	1.000	22	7	6	6	0	0	22	7
Norwich	–	–	–	–	–	–	–	–	–	–	–	–	–
NYU	–	–	–	–	–	–	–	–	–	–	–	–	–
Princeton	6	2	4	0	.333	24	32	13	5	7	1	55	64
Providence	–	–	–	–	–	–	–	8	1	7	0	13	39
Rensselaer	–	–	–	–	–	–	–	3	0	2	1	–	–
St. Lawrence	–	–	–	–	–	–	–	7	3	4	0	–	–
Syracuse	–	–	–	–	–	–	–	–	–	–	–	–	–
Union	5	3	2	0	.600	18	14	5	3	2	0	18	14
Vermont	–	–	–	–	–	–	–	–	–	–	–	–	–
Williams	12	6	6	0	.500	38	40	12	6	6	0	38	40
Yale	12	8	3	1	.708	72	26	16	8	7	1	80	45
YMCA College	7	3	4	0	.429	16	19	7	3	4	0	16	19

== Schedule and results ==
Date	Opponent	Site	Result	Record
Regular Season
January 8	Bates*	UNH Ice Rink • Durham, New Hampshire	W 4–1	1–0–0
January 12	Bowdoin*	UNH Ice Rink • Durham, New Hampshire	W 4–1	2–0–0
February 5	YMCA College*	UNH Ice Rink • Durham, New Hampshire	W 3–1	3–0–0
February 9	at YMCA College*	Eastern States Coliseum • Springfield, Massachusetts	W 2–1	4–0–0
February 11	at Brown*	Rhode Island Auditorium • Providence, Rhode Island	W 4–2	5–0–0
February 12	at Providence*	Rhode Island Auditorium • Providence, Rhode Island	W 5–1	6–0–0
February 22	UNH Alumni*	UNH Ice Rink • Durham, New Hampshire (Exhibition)	W 4–3	
*Non-conference game.

== Scoring statistics ==
Name	Position	Games	Goals
Warren Percival	C	-	8
Howard Crins	LW/RW	-	5
Doc Ide	LW/RW	-	3
Al Reinheart	LW/RW	-	2
Ed Vatter	D	-	2
Baron Chandler	D	-	1
Searls Dearington	LW	-	1
Leo Garvey	RW	-	0
John Hatch	D	-	0
Everett Moore	D	-	0
John Rogers	G	-	0
Carl Wendelin	D	-	0
Norm Young	C	-	0
Total			22
