= 1926–27 Massachusetts Agricultural Aggies men's ice hockey season =

- Conference: Independent
- Home ice: Alumni Field Rink

Record
- Overall: 2–4–1
- Home: 1–1–0
- Road: 0–2–0
- Neutral: 0–1–1

Coaches and captains
- Head coach: Lorin Ball
- Captain: Joe Forest

The 1926–27 Massachusetts Agricultural Aggies men's ice hockey season was the 19th season of play for the program. The Aggies were coached by Lorin Ball in his 3rd season.

== Season ==
Before the start of the season, MAC was engaged by several other New England schools about the possibility of joining a new conference. Plans for the New England Intercollegiate Hockey League began after the completion of the Rhode Island Auditorium that allowed both Brown and Providence access to consistent ice for the first time. The prospective teams were planning on holding all conference games at either the Auditorium, the Boston Arena, or the Big E Coliseum, which had just recently been converted to allow for ice hockey. While the invitation was tempting, the Aggies decided against joining the conference in 1927 as they already had a 12-game schedule arranged. With their season outlined by early December, the 20 or so candidates for the team met and began off-ice training.

With all three groups losing starters (forward, defense and goalie) the team would have to be rebuilt by coach Ball, but he was still a relative novice in the sport. The Aggies would have to rely on team captain Joe Forest all the more to pull them out of a scoring drought that had plagued them all of last season. One bit of good news was that the weather seemed to be accommodating, at least to begin the new year. The players returned from the winter break early to get as much training in as possible prior to the first game. The team was formed around returning lettermen Forest, Abrahamson and Frese with each moving around the lineup to find the best position. The training seemed to be working when the team hit the ice in mid-January for the first match with Bates. Both squads were defensive stalwarts and that play was mostly even throughout the game. Ducky Swan got the Aggies on the board after a slow start but the Garnet defense stiffened afterwards. Bates knotted the score at the start of the second but no more goals were forthcoming. Several penalties were called in the third but neither team could take advantage and regulation ended with the score even. The first 5-minute overtime was unable to settle things so a second session was needed. In a brilliant individual effort, Forest skated through the Bobcats and fired home the winning goal to start the team's season in style.

The following week the team set out for a 3-game trip through New York. Unfortunately, the weather had turned and two games were cancelled. The only match the team was able to play came against Hamilton, who used an indoor rink. After a scoreless first period, Hamilton jumped out to a 2-goal lead in the second. Swan cut the lead in half in the third but the Aggies couldn't get a second and fell by a narrow margin. Aside from the loss, the team was bit by the injury bug; Forest was hit in the face with a high stick and had a badly swollen lip while Abrahamson tweaked his knee. Both players were expected to be available for the trip up to Maine the following week. Before their sojourn north, MAC returned home for a match with Amherst. Warm weather forced the game to be played on the campus pond that was played at a fast pace in spite of the ice conditions. Due to an infected lip, Forest was forced to miss the game and his absence had a damaging impact on the Aggie offense. The Lord Jeffs got on the board first and then played a very physical brand of hockey afterwards. One of the Purple wingers received a 3-minute penalty for hitting Galanie in the head with a stick and the rest of the Sabrinas were so oft sent to the box that, at one point, there were only two Amherst players on the ice (one skater and the goalie). The Aggies, much to their chagrin, could not get anything into the Amherst cage. Currier, the Jeffs' netminder, was absolutely perfect in the match and shut down the anemic MAC offense.

Forest was still out when the team headed up to take on Colby. MAC could not generate any offense without their captain and were frustrated by the Muled who employed nearly twice as many players in the game as the Aggies. The rematch with Bates saw much of the same, however, poor ice conditions curtailed any attempts at offense. With puddles littering the ice, the game was slowed to a crawl and neither team managed to score. Even after two overtime sessions the scoresheet remained empty and the match was called.

MAC went on its third and final road trip at the start of February and tried to escape the poor ice conditions in Vermont. Forest had sufficiently recovered in time and was back with the team on the trip. Unfortunately, both he and the offense were out of sorts in the first game when they took on Middlebury. The Panthers stifling defense game no room to the Aggies and the team was unable to score for the fourth consecutive game, a level of offensive ineptitude that had never been matched. Fortunately, the team was finally able to get the puck into the net the following night against Vermont. Cook and Frese each tallied in the game to give MAC its second win of the year and hopefully turn around their season.

The Aggies were scheduled to play four more games in February, however, the warm weather had not abated in the interim. With no ice on which to play games, let alone practice, the athletic department decided to cancel the remainder of the season. MAC had played just 7 out of a scheduled 13 games when the season was abruptly ended.

Andrew Anderson served as team manager with James Cunningham as his assistant.

== Roster ==
No.	Nat.	Player	Class	Pos	Height	Weight	DoB	Hometown	Previous team
	(United States)	Howard J. Abrahamson	Junior					Waltham, Massachusetts
	(United States)	Albert C. Cook	Junior				1902-06-03	Waverley, Massachusetts
	(United States)	Theodore A. Farwell	Senior				1902-12-05	Turners Falls, Massachusetts
	(United States)	Joseph H. Forest (C)	Junior				1906-07-06	Arlington, Massachusetts
	(United States)	Paul F. Frese	Junior					Waltham, Massachusetts
	(United States)	Demetrius L. Galanie	Senior				1904-09-21	Natick, Massachusetts
	(United States)	Donald R. Lane	Junior					Brockton, Massachusetts
	(United States)	Robley W. Nash	Sophomore					Abington, Massachusetts
	(United States)	Frederick W. Swan	Senior					Milton, Massachusetts

== Standings ==
1926–27 Eastern Collegiate ice hockey standings
	Intercollegiate							Overall					
	GP	W	L	T	Pct.	GF	GA	GP	W	L	T	GF	GA
Amherst	8	3	2	3	.563	9	9	8	3	2	3	9	9
Army	3	0	2	1	.167	5	13	4	0	3	1	7	20
Bates	8	4	3	1	.563	17	18	10	6	3	1	22	19
Boston College	2	1	1	0	.500	2	3	6	3	3	0	15	18
Boston University	7	2	4	1	.357	25	18	8	2	5	1	25	23
Bowdoin	8	3	5	0	.375	17	23	9	4	5	0	26	24
Brown	8	4	4	0	.500	16	26	8	4	4	0	16	26
Clarkson	9	8	1	0	.889	42	11	9	8	1	0	42	11
Colby	7	3	4	0	.429	16	12	7	3	4	0	16	12
Cornell	7	1	6	0	.143	10	23	7	1	6	0	10	23
Dartmouth	–	–	–	–	–	–	–	15	11	2	2	68	20
Hamilton	–	–	–	–	–	–	–	10	6	4	0	–	–
Harvard	8	7	0	1	.938	32	9	12	9	1	2	44	18
Massachusetts Agricultural	7	2	4	1	.357	5	10	7	2	4	1	5	10
Middlebury	6	6	0	0	1.000	25	7	6	6	0	0	25	7
MIT	8	3	4	1	.438	19	21	8	3	4	1	19	21
New Hampshire	6	6	0	0	1.000	22	7	6	6	0	0	22	7
Norwich	–	–	–	–	–	–	–	–	–	–	–	–	–
NYU	–	–	–	–	–	–	–	–	–	–	–	–	–
Princeton	6	2	4	0	.333	24	32	13	5	7	1	55	64
Providence	–	–	–	–	–	–	–	8	1	7	0	13	39
Rensselaer	–	–	–	–	–	–	–	3	0	2	1	–	–
St. Lawrence	–	–	–	–	–	–	–	7	3	4	0	–	–
Syracuse	–	–	–	–	–	–	–	–	–	–	–	–	–
Union	5	3	2	0	.600	18	14	5	3	2	0	18	14
Vermont	–	–	–	–	–	–	–	–	–	–	–	–	–
Williams	12	6	6	0	.500	38	40	12	6	6	0	38	40
Yale	12	8	3	1	.708	72	26	16	8	7	1	80	45
YMCA College	7	3	4	0	.429	16	19	7	3	4	0	16	19

== Schedule and results ==
Date	Opponent	Site	Result	Record
Regular Season
January 13	Bates*	Alumni Field Rink • Amherst, Massachusetts	W 2–1 ^{2OT}	1–0–0
January 22	at Hamilton*	Russell Sage Rink • Clinton, New York	L 1–2	1–1–0
January 25	Amherst*	Campus Pond • Amherst, Massachusetts	L 0–1	1–2–0
January 28	vs. Colby*	South End Arena • Waterville, Maine	L 0–2	1–3–0
January 29	vs. Bates*	Bartlett Street Rink • Lewiston, Maine	T 0–0 ^{2OT}	1–3–1
February 4	at Middlebury*	Middlebury, Vermont	L 0–3	1–4–1
February 5	at Vermont*	Burlington, Vermont	W 2–1	2–4–1
*Non-conference game.

== Scoring statistics ==
Name	Position	Games	Goals
Ducky Swan	LW/RW	7	2
Joe Forest	LW	4	1
Al Cook	LW/RW	6	1
Paul Frese	C	7	1
Don Lane	D	1	0
Howard Abrahamson	D	7	0
Ted Farwell	D	7	0
Demmie Galanie	G	7	0
Robby Nash	LW/RW	7	0
Total			5
