= 1926–27 Bates Bobcats men's ice hockey season =

Intercollegiate hockey season

- Conference: Independent
- Home ice: Parker Hall Rink

Record
- Overall: 6–3–1
- Home: 1–0–0
- Road: 2–2–0
- Neutral: 3–1–1

Coaches and captains
- Head coach: Carleton Wiggin
- Captain: Al Lane

The 1926–27 Bates men's ice hockey season was the 8th season of play for the program.

== Season ==
After two forgettable seasons for the Bobcats, the ice hockey team was chaoping at the bit to recover its past glory. A mostly veteran lineup returned and while the defense had to be remade, the forward contingent was the same that led the turnaround at the end of the previous season. Lou Foster centered Howard White and team captain Al Lane with all three expected to continue their scoring exploits. With no experienced goaltender on the team, coach Wiggin turned to Manny Palmer in goal and hoped that the new recruit would hold up under pressure.

The first game for the team happened just after New Years against an amateur club led by the four Turcotte brothers. The game had a late start and was dominated by physical play and diminishing light but the Bobcats were still able to pull of the win. Palmer was busy in the match but acquitted himself well with his first career shutout. A few days later the team travelled to Durham to battle New Hampshire but were done in by a small rink and unfamiliar tactics. The Wildcats fired several long shots on goal and the defense was unable to get control of the puck time and again. The offense for Bates was apparent, however, the opposing goaltender played a masterful game and only allowed a single goal to the Garnet.

The following week, Bates was again on the road, this time facing the UMass Aggies. The game was a close-fought battle that required 2 overtime periods to decide. In the first extra frame, the Bobcats found themselves down by 2 men on the penalty kill but managed to survive. Unfortunately, in the second overtime, the opposing captain netted the winning goal and gave Bates another loss. A few days later, a winter storm swept through the region that damaged the ice surface at Army. The entire pleb class was called out to sweep the rink in the hoped of making it usable but there was nothing that could be done in time. Army offered to hold the game early the following week, however, because Bates was scheduled to play Bowdoin on Tuesday, the team was forced to decline and the game was cancelled.

The exhibition match with Bowdoin started off with the Polar Beas taking a 3-goal lead after the first. Bates then stormed back with 6 goals, the final with only a few minutes remaining, to take the game and send their old foes packing. That game seemed to be the turning point of the season and the Garnet began to show a greater level of teamwork than they had previously. Against a much larger squad from Colby, the Bobcats skated rings around the Mules, peppering the net with 34 shots. Bates built a 2-goal lead by the start of the third period. However, Colby was able to score twice in the final period to force overtime. The extra period was a fast and furious affair with both teams scrambling to get the winning goal. White ended up being the hero for the Bobcats, firing the puck through a maze of bodies. Winter storms affted the next few games, which were all played at the covered Bartlett Street Rink as a result. After playing in a swamp against the Aggies, Bates put up solid performances in games against St. Dominique's and their alumni squad and the team was looking good as they headed into the exam break.

Upon their return, the team was buoyed by the addition of several freshman who, having now passed their first semesters, were now eligible for varsity play. Cruiser Cogan, younger brother for former standout Joe Cogan, took over at center. This allowed Foster to drop back to defense, where he had played previously. Secor joined a deep defensive corps while Raoul Violette took over in goal. The new-look Bobcats met Colby in a snowstorm and, as a result, the two played four 15-minute periods so that they could remove the precipitation more often. The game was slowed as a result but Bates eked out a narrow win thanks to the infusion of new players. The first true match with Bowdoin was up next and the Bobcats got into another nail-biter. Bates carried the play in the first, getting a goal from Cogan, but the Bears picked up the pace as the game wore on. The physicality increased and saw both teams getting called for penalties in the third. Bowdoin knotted the match in the second and neither team seemed able to win in regulation. With less than two minutes to play, Lane whacked the puck into the Bowdoin cage for the winning marker. The following game against Colby saw the team take a 2-goal lead after the first and then try to coast to victory. Coach Wiggin used several alternates afterwards but the Mules seemed unable to take advantage. Near the end of the third, however, Colby scored twice to send the game into overtime and then netted the winner in the fourth extra frame.

While Bates was supposed to play Bowdoin a second time after an earlier match had been called off, they weren't able to arrange the rematch. The team tried to convince the Polar Bears to let the exhibition game stand as an official match but Bowdoin declined and insisted a true rematch be held instead. Unfortunately, nothing materialized and the two were forced to settle the series on one match. The result, however, was a state championship for Bates as they had also taken the season series from Colby.

Emery Goody served as team manager.

== Roster ==
No.	Nat.	Player	Class	Pos	Height	Weight	DoB	Hometown	Previous team
		George H. Barnaby	Junior	D
		Ronald B. Calder	Freshman	D			1908-02-18
	(United States)	John B. Cogan	Freshman	C			1908-08-06	Stoneham, Massachusetts
		William G. Coutts	Freshman	D/RW
	(United States)	Lewis F. Foster	Junior	D/C			1906-10-14	Belmont, Massachusetts
	(United States)	Raynold L. Fuller	Senior	D			1904-07-01	Liberty, Maine
	(United States)	Fred T. Goggins	Senior	D				Portland, Maine
		George H. Johnson Jr.	Sophomore	C
	(United States)	Bernard A. Landman	Senior	RW			1905-05-08	Wolfeboro, New Hampshire
	(United States)	Almon G. Lane Jr. (C)	Senior	LW			1905-07-12	Lewiston, Maine
	(United States)	Maurice J. Lane	Sophomore	D			1906-07-13	Lewiston, Maine
		Francis P. Malia	Junior	D
	(United States)	George V. Osgood	Senior	D			1904-02-03	Auburn, Maine
	(United States)	Manford L. Palmer	Junior	G			1906-07-12	Norway, Maine
	(United States)	Morris H. Secor	Freshman	D/RW			1908-07-19	Belmont, Massachusetts
		Thomas		D/LW
		Raoul H. Violette	Freshman	G			1905-07-21
	(United States)	Howard S. White	Junior	RW			1907-04-27	Belmont, Massachusetts

== Standings ==
1926–27 Eastern Collegiate ice hockey standings
	Intercollegiate							Overall					
	GP	W	L	T	Pct.	GF	GA	GP	W	L	T	GF	GA
Amherst	8	3	2	3	.563	9	9	8	3	2	3	9	9
Army	3	0	2	1	.167	5	13	4	0	3	1	7	20
Bates	8	4	3	1	.563	17	18	10	6	3	1	22	19
Boston College	2	1	1	0	.500	2	3	6	3	3	0	15	18
Boston University	7	2	4	1	.357	25	18	8	2	5	1	25	23
Bowdoin	8	3	5	0	.375	17	23	9	4	5	0	26	24
Brown	8	4	4	0	.500	16	26	8	4	4	0	16	26
Clarkson	9	8	1	0	.889	42	11	9	8	1	0	42	11
Colby	7	3	4	0	.429	16	12	7	3	4	0	16	12
Cornell	7	1	6	0	.143	10	23	7	1	6	0	10	23
Dartmouth	–	–	–	–	–	–	–	15	11	2	2	68	20
Hamilton	–	–	–	–	–	–	–	10	6	4	0	–	–
Harvard	8	7	0	1	.938	32	9	12	9	1	2	44	18
Massachusetts Agricultural	7	2	4	1	.357	5	10	7	2	4	1	5	10
Middlebury	6	6	0	0	1.000	25	7	6	6	0	0	25	7
MIT	8	3	4	1	.438	19	21	8	3	4	1	19	21
New Hampshire	6	6	0	0	1.000	22	7	6	6	0	0	22	7
Norwich	–	–	–	–	–	–	–	–	–	–	–	–	–
NYU	–	–	–	–	–	–	–	–	–	–	–	–	–
Princeton	6	2	4	0	.333	24	32	13	5	7	1	55	64
Providence	–	–	–	–	–	–	–	8	1	7	0	13	39
Rensselaer	–	–	–	–	–	–	–	3	0	2	1	–	–
St. Lawrence	–	–	–	–	–	–	–	7	3	4	0	–	–
Syracuse	–	–	–	–	–	–	–	–	–	–	–	–	–
Union	5	3	2	0	.600	18	14	5	3	2	0	18	14
Vermont	–	–	–	–	–	–	–	–	–	–	–	–	–
Williams	12	6	6	0	.500	38	40	12	6	6	0	38	40
Yale	12	8	3	1	.708	72	26	16	8	7	1	80	45
YMCA College	7	3	4	0	.429	16	19	7	3	4	0	16	19

== Schedule and results ==
Date	Opponent	Site	Result	Record
Regular Season
January 5	Brunswick Cabots*	Parker Hall Rink • Lewiston, Maine	W 3–0	1–0–0
January 8	at New Hampshire*	UNH Ice Rink • Durham, New Hampshire	L 1–4	1–1–0
January 13	at Massachusetts Agricultural*	Alumni Field Rink • Amherst, Massachusetts	L 1–2 ^{2OT}	1–2–0
January 18	at Bowdoin*	Delta Rink • Brunswick, Maine	W 6–5	2–2–0
January 26	vs. Colby*	Bartlett Street Rink • Lewiston, Maine	W 3–2 ^{2OT}	3–2–0
January 29	vs. Massachusetts Agricultural*	Bartlett Street Rink • Lewiston, Maine	T 0–0 ^{2OT}	3–2–1
February	at St. Dominique's 2nd*	Bartlett Street Rink • Lewiston, Maine	W 2–1	4–2–1
February	vs. Bates Alumni*	Bartlett Street Rink • Lewiston, Maine (Exhibition)	W 5–0	
February 16	vs. Colby*	Bartlett Street Rink • Lewiston, Maine	W 2–1	5–2–1
February 19	vs. Bowdoin*	Bartlett Street Rink • Lewiston, Maine	W 2–1	6–2–1
February 22	vs. Colby*	Bartlett Street Rink • Lewiston, Maine	L 2–3 ^{4OT}	6–3–1
*Non-conference game.

Note: Bates referred to the first match with Bowdoin as an 'exhibition' because it was not counted towards the state championship. It is an official contest.
