= 1926–27 Union Skating Dutchmen ice hockey season =

- Conference: Independent
- Home ice: Central Park Rink

Record
- Overall: 3–2–0
- Road: 3–2–0

Coaches and captains
- Head coach: Harold A. Larrabee
- Captain: John Gilmour

The 1926–27 Union Skating Dutchmen men's ice hockey season was the 14th season of play for the program. The Skating Dutchmen represented Union College and were coached by Harold A. Larrabee in his 2nd season.

== Season ==
The situation for Union's ice hockey team looked to be improving this season as not only was the Central Park Rink still available to the Dutchmen but H. A. Larrabee returned as coach, the first time the program had the same leader since the end of the war. The player hit the ice as soon as the weather turned cold enough and got as much practice time in as they could before the match with Syracuse. While expectations were for a close game, Union surpassed those predictions with a resounding victory. The returning forward line of Clifford, Gilmour and Hyland played just as well as they had in '26 with the speedy Hyland recording a hat-trick. A big boost to the team was the return of Bruce Mulqueen to the blueline. After missing all of the previous season, Mulqueen was a bulwark on defense and helped new starter Cunningham post the first shutout of his college career.

Union faced a much toucher challenge in its second game when the team travelled to take on Williams. Despite being played in a snowstorm, the game was an exciting match that saw both teams have a chance to win all the way until the end. Clifford opened the scoring early and the two then played scoreless for nearly two periods. Beale raised Union's lead at the start of the third but the Ephs finally broke through the pair of goals in quick succession. Hyland gave his team the lead once more but that too was swiftly erased by Williams. The offense continued to press but was unable to secure another goal, leaving Williams' final tally at the end of the period as the game-winner. The team had two home games scheduled before the exam break, however, warm weather forced the cancellation of both.

The team was looking forward to a home game after the break but weather intervened once more. This time, however, the team was prepared for the situation and moved the game to their opponent's rink. With Gilmour injured and Mulqueen lost to graduation, the Garnet played one of their finest games to date against Amherst for the second win of the season. Cunningham was particularly notable for his outstanding play that kept his time in long enough for Clifford's second of the match to decide the outcome. A third cancellation was made after the match and left the team with but one home game left on the schedule.

The conditions were so bad at the time that even the game with Hamilton was at risk despite their possession of a covered rink. Fortunately, however, the ice was in good enough shape when Union arrived. Union went down to defeat in the game but, after losses of 2–13 and 1–8 over the previous two seasons, the scores were at least getting closer. Following the loss the fifth and final home game was also cancelled. Union was able to play the last game on their schedule when they headed down to Brooklyn to face NYU. The Violets were a very large team, averaging over 180 lbs. per player but that size came at a cost. Union was able to skate rings around the home team and the return of John Gilmour saw the Garnet win their final match of a very trying year.

This was the last winning season for the Dutchmen for 13 years.

== Roster ==
No.	Nat.	Player	Class	Pos	Height	Weight	DoB	Hometown	Previous team
	(United States)	John S. Beale	Freshman	LW/RW			1908-11-06	Schenectady, New York
	(United States)	Robert B. Beale Jr.	Sophomore				1906-10-06	Schenectady, New York
		Leslie P. Clifford	Senior	RW
		Cunningham		G
		John G. Gilmour (C)	Senior	C/LW
	(United States)	Donald F. Hyland	Junior	C			1904-12-14	Utica, New York
		Bruce A. Mulqueen	Senior	D
		Paul E. Schultze Jr.	Junior	D
		Hugh J. Slattery	Senior	D
		Roger T. Stone	Junior	D			1906-04-05

== Standings ==
1926–27 Eastern Collegiate ice hockey standings
	Intercollegiate							Overall					
	GP	W	L	T	Pct.	GF	GA	GP	W	L	T	GF	GA
Amherst	8	3	2	3	.563	9	9	8	3	2	3	9	9
Army	3	0	2	1	.167	5	13	4	0	3	1	7	20
Bates	8	4	3	1	.563	17	18	10	6	3	1	22	19
Boston College	2	1	1	0	.500	2	3	6	3	3	0	15	18
Boston University	7	2	4	1	.357	25	18	8	2	5	1	25	23
Bowdoin	8	3	5	0	.375	17	23	9	4	5	0	26	24
Brown	8	4	4	0	.500	16	26	8	4	4	0	16	26
Clarkson	9	8	1	0	.889	42	11	9	8	1	0	42	11
Colby	7	3	4	0	.429	16	12	7	3	4	0	16	12
Cornell	7	1	6	0	.143	10	23	7	1	6	0	10	23
Dartmouth	–	–	–	–	–	–	–	15	11	2	2	68	20
Hamilton	–	–	–	–	–	–	–	10	6	4	0	–	–
Harvard	8	7	0	1	.938	32	9	12	9	1	2	44	18
Massachusetts Agricultural	7	2	4	1	.357	5	10	7	2	4	1	5	10
Middlebury	6	6	0	0	1.000	25	7	6	6	0	0	25	7
MIT	8	3	4	1	.438	19	21	8	3	4	1	19	21
New Hampshire	6	6	0	0	1.000	22	7	6	6	0	0	22	7
Norwich	–	–	–	–	–	–	–	–	–	–	–	–	–
NYU	–	–	–	–	–	–	–	–	–	–	–	–	–
Princeton	6	2	4	0	.333	24	32	13	5	7	1	55	64
Providence	–	–	–	–	–	–	–	8	1	7	0	13	39
Rensselaer	–	–	–	–	–	–	–	3	0	2	1	–	–
St. Lawrence	–	–	–	–	–	–	–	7	3	4	0	–	–
Syracuse	–	–	–	–	–	–	–	–	–	–	–	–	–
Union	5	3	2	0	.600	18	14	5	3	2	0	18	14
Vermont	–	–	–	–	–	–	–	–	–	–	–	–	–
Williams	12	6	6	0	.500	38	40	12	6	6	0	38	40
Yale	12	8	3	1	.708	72	26	16	8	7	1	80	45
YMCA College	7	3	4	0	.429	16	19	7	3	4	0	16	19

== Schedule and results ==
Date	Opponent	Site	Result	Record
Regular Season
January 8	at Syracuse*	Syracuse, New York	W 5–0	1–0–0
January 15	at Williams*	Sage Hall Rink • Williamstown, Massachusetts	L 3–4	1–1–0
February 11	Amherst*	Central Park Rink • Schenectady, New York	W 3–2 ^{2OT}	2–1–0
February 19	at Hamilton*	Russell Sage Rink • Clinton, New York	L 2–5	2–2–0
February 25	at NYU*	Brooklyn Ice Palace • Brooklyn, New York	W 5–3	3–2–0
*Non-conference game.
