= 1926–27 MIT Engineers men's ice hockey season =

- Conference: Independent
- Home ice: Boston Arena

Record
- Overall: 3–4–1
- Home: 0–1–0
- Road: 2–0–0
- Neutral: 1–3–1

Coaches and captains
- Head coach: Bill Stewart
- Captain: Bill Berkeley

The 1926–27 MIT Engineers men's ice hockey season was the 26th season of play for the program. The Engineers were coached by Bill Stewart in his 2nd season.

== Season ==
Entering the season, MIT had just 2 starters returning from the previous years' squad, however, several others did have some experience with the Engineers. Captain Bill Berkeley teamed up with fellow senior Deke Crandall on the blueline while Bill Richards took over in goal full-time. The forward unit was an entirely new contingent with Fahey, Crosby and Duplin getting first team roles for the opening tilt. Coach Stewart tried to fight fire with fire and match the many alternates that Harvard used, however, they were unable to match the speed of the Crimson. Berkeley snagged the lone MIT goal on a long shot while the forwards were ineffective throughout the match. The second game saw a better effort as MIT tied Boston University 2–2. Two 5-minute overtime periods were unable to settle the score but did allow the forwards to finally show that they were worthy of their positions.

After the winter break the team travelled to Springfield for a match with Yale. MIT gave the Elis all that they could handle and held back the Bulldogs offense. After Richards surrendered an early goal, the Engineer netminder refused entry and turned aside everything that Yale sent in his direction. Despite being outshot through most of the match, MIT found itself down by just a goal in the third and were able to tie the match before the end of regulation. Yale seemed to take the overtime session personally and their captain scored twice in the first few minutes to give them a commanding lead. The Engineers were able to get one into the Bulldog net but could not earn the second and fell to the Elis by a narrow margin. Though winless in their first three games, the Engineers had already shown an improving level of play and were champing at the bit when they travelled west to face Army. The Cadets were no match for the Garnet and MIT easily won the game 7–0.

The team returned home for a rematch with BU and found themselves in another close battle. When the dust settled, however, MIT came out on top. A match at Dartmouth was postponed due to a lack of ice and left just the game against Boston College left before the exam break. MIT's defense was nigh-impenetrable with Berkeley and Crandall playing a masterful game on the blueline. Only one shot got past Richards but, due to the stellar defensive play from the Eagles, that was enough to sink the Engineers.

A month later, the team was ready to play the match with Dartmouth, having moved the cite of the game to Boston. While MIT had been idle in the interim, the Indians were carrying a 5-game winning streak and flattened the Engineers 7–0. Afterwards, the team had nearly two weeks off before their final match with Brown. The Engineers practiced as much as they could before heading down to Rhode Island and facing the Bears. With White now in goal and Cullinan starting in place of Fahey, the team was enen more reliant on the defense and elder statesmen came through in the clutch. Brown was hardly able to get a shot on goal while MIT made the most of its scant opportunities. Cullinan, Duplin and Crandall each scored to give the team a 3–0 win and end the season on a high note.

Herbert B. Whiting served as team manager with.

== Roster ==
No.	Nat.	Player	Class	Pos	Height	Weight	DoB	Hometown	Previous team
	(United States)	William P. Berkeley (C)	Senior	D			1905-07-13	Cambridge, Massachusetts
	(United States)	Montague S. Burgess	Junior	D			1906-03-29	Brookline, Massachusetts
	(United States)	Frank J. Crandall	Senior	D			1904-01-01	Everett, Massachusetts
	(United States)	Ralph H. Crosby	Sophomore	C			1906-11-05	Somerville, Massachusetts
	(United States)	William E. Cullinan Jr.	Sophomore	RW			1907-08-17	Cambridge, Massachusetts
	(United States)	Victor J. Duplin Jr.	Sophomore	LW			1904-12-03	Stoneham, Massachusetts
	(United States)	John J. Fahey	Junior	RW			1906-08-14	Derby, Connecticut
	(United States)	Francis M. Mead	Junior	C			1906-10-23	Belmont, Massachusetts
	(Canada)	Walter J. Nock	Junior	RW			1906-10-13	Mexico City, Mexico
	(United States)	William H. Richards	Senior	G			1906-06-16	Boston, Massachusetts
	(United States)	George E. White	Sophomore	G/F			1906-11-13	Quincy, Massachusetts

== Standings ==
1926–27 Eastern Collegiate ice hockey standings
	Intercollegiate							Overall					
	GP	W	L	T	Pct.	GF	GA	GP	W	L	T	GF	GA
Amherst	8	3	2	3	.563	9	9	8	3	2	3	9	9
Army	3	0	2	1	.167	5	13	4	0	3	1	7	20
Bates	8	4	3	1	.563	17	18	10	6	3	1	22	19
Boston College	2	1	1	0	.500	2	3	6	3	3	0	15	18
Boston University	7	2	4	1	.357	25	18	8	2	5	1	25	23
Bowdoin	8	3	5	0	.375	17	23	9	4	5	0	26	24
Brown	8	4	4	0	.500	16	26	8	4	4	0	16	26
Clarkson	9	8	1	0	.889	42	11	9	8	1	0	42	11
Colby	7	3	4	0	.429	16	12	7	3	4	0	16	12
Cornell	7	1	6	0	.143	10	23	7	1	6	0	10	23
Dartmouth	–	–	–	–	–	–	–	15	11	2	2	68	20
Hamilton	–	–	–	–	–	–	–	10	6	4	0	–	–
Harvard	8	7	0	1	.938	32	9	12	9	1	2	44	18
Massachusetts Agricultural	7	2	4	1	.357	5	10	7	2	4	1	5	10
Middlebury	6	6	0	0	1.000	25	7	6	6	0	0	25	7
MIT	8	3	4	1	.438	19	21	8	3	4	1	19	21
New Hampshire	6	6	0	0	1.000	22	7	6	6	0	0	22	7
Norwich	–	–	–	–	–	–	–	–	–	–	–	–	–
NYU	–	–	–	–	–	–	–	–	–	–	–	–	–
Princeton	6	2	4	0	.333	24	32	13	5	7	1	55	64
Providence	–	–	–	–	–	–	–	8	1	7	0	13	39
Rensselaer	–	–	–	–	–	–	–	3	0	2	1	–	–
St. Lawrence	–	–	–	–	–	–	–	7	3	4	0	–	–
Syracuse	–	–	–	–	–	–	–	–	–	–	–	–	–
Union	5	3	2	0	.600	18	14	5	3	2	0	18	14
Vermont	–	–	–	–	–	–	–	–	–	–	–	–	–
Williams	12	6	6	0	.500	38	40	12	6	6	0	38	40
Yale	12	8	3	1	.708	72	26	16	8	7	1	80	45
YMCA College	7	3	4	0	.429	16	19	7	3	4	0	16	19

== Schedule and results ==
Date	Opponent	Site	Result	Record
Regular Season
December 10	vs. Harvard*	Boston Arena • Boston, Massachusetts	L 1–5	0–1–0
December 17	vs. Boston University*	Boston Arena • Boston, Massachusetts	T 2–2 ^{2OT}	0–1–1
January 3	vs. Yale*	Eastern States Coliseum • Springfield, Massachusetts	L 2–3 ^{OT}	0–2–1
January 8	at Army*	Stuart Rink • West Point, New York	W 7–0	1–2–1
January 13	vs. Boston University*	Boston Arena • Boston, Massachusetts	W 4–3	2–2–1
January 21	vs. Boston College*	Boston Arena • Boston, Massachusetts	L 0–1	2–3–1
February 21	Dartmouth*	Boston Arena • Boston, Massachusetts	L 0–7	2–4–1
March 5	at Brown*	Rhode Island Auditorium • Providence, Rhode Island	W 3–0	3–4–1
*Non-conference game.
