= 1926–27 Amherst Lord Jeffs men's ice hockey season =

- Conference: Independent
- Home ice: Pratt Field

Record
- Overall: 3–2–3
- Home: 0–0–1
- Road: 3–2–2

Coaches and captains
- Head coach: Henry F. White
- Captain: Malcolm Cameron

The 1926–27 Amherst Lord Jeffs men's ice hockey season was the 14th season of play for the program. The Lord Jeffs were coached by Henry White in his 1st season.

== Season ==
Just like the previous two seasons, the Lord Jeffs had to battle through poor weather conditions for their entire campaign. However, this time around the team was able to take steps to mitigate those problems. First and foremost, Henry White was hired as the program's first full-time coach in three years. With him at the helm, Amherst was steadied through the troubled waters.

The team's season opener with Middlebury was cancelled due to poor ice conditions. The second game was in jeopardy of suffering the same fate, however, the Eastern States Coliseum agreed to host the game and allow the match with YMCA College to proceed. The lack of practice time showed in the Jeffmen's poor teamwork but they still managed to put forth a credible effort. The team returned home to face cross-town rivals Massachusetts Agricultural but were forced to play on a pond. Team captain Malcolm Cameron opened the scoring with a hard shot in the first before the match descended into a brawl. Both teams were whistled for a multitude of infractions with Amherst receiving the lion's share. At one point in the third period, only Cameron and goaltender Currier were on the ice for the Lord Jeffs but somehow the Sabrinas held off the Aggies to win 1–0. Rensselaer arrived in town at the end of the month but the game was delayed due to bad ice. Instead of wasting the trip, the visitors hung around long after sunset in the hopes of playing the match. Their patience was rewarded with a 10:00 pm start time. The game was played under flood lights but the pace was very slow due to the soft ice. Neither side could score in the time allowed and, due to the late start, no overtime was played.

At the beginning of February, Amherst went on an arduous road trip with three games in three days. First up was a match with Little Three rival Williams. The warm weather persisted and left the ice in a sad state but both teams played on regardless. Williams had the better of the play but Currier put forth another stellar performance and stopped everything sent in his direction. At the beginning of the second period, Cameron netted the game's only goal on what MAC believed was an offside play, however, the goal was allowed to stand. The remainder of the match was played almost exclusively in the Amherst end but no matter how hard they tried the Ephs could not solve Currier. The Jeffmen then headed south to take on NYU. In a rare appearance by the Violets on the ice, the two battled to a 1–1 draw with Cameron again securing the only goal. The final match of the trip came against Army and had an eerily similar result; Cameron scored the only goal for Amherst in a 1–1 draw.

The following week, the team went on final road trip for the season but were hampered by being unable to practice ahead of the games. Even with a bit of rust, the team performed well. Patrick and Cameron both netted goals but that only served to keep the game tied. Union scored early in the first overtime and Amherst was unable to reply, leaving the game as a loss for the Jeffmen. The following evening, Hamilton was the next victim of the stout Amherst defense. The duo of Perry and Parnall proved to be an invaluable asset to the team with Currier cleaning up just about everything that leaked through. A second match with Williams had been scheduled but, after several postponements, the game was scrapped when the weather would not cooperate.

Lydon F. Maider served as team manager with Martial D. Maling as his assistant.

== Roster ==
No.	Nat.	Player	Class	Pos	Height	Weight	DoB	Hometown	Previous team
	(United States)	Malcolm K. Cameron (C)	Junior	C			1905-12-30	Greenfield, Massachusetts
	(United States)	Charles R. Currier Jr.	Junior	G			1907-02-19	Jamaica Plain, Massachusetts
	(United States)	Geoffrey G. Felt	Sophomore	LW/RW			1907-02-12	Melrose, Massachusetts
	(United States)	Robert S. Hanford	Junior					Rochester, New York
	(United States)	Norman Lawson	Senior	LW				Brooklyn, New York
	(United States)	Albert J. Nichols	Freshman	RW				West Hartford, Connecticut
	(United States)	Christopher G. Parnall Jr.	Sophomore	D			1909-09-21	Rochester, New York
	(United States)	Loomis Patrick	Senior	RW				West Newton, Massachusetts
	(United States)	Rowland V. Patrick	Sophomore	RW				West Newton, Massachusetts
	(United States)	Hubert L. Perry	Freshman	D			1908-05-20	Buffalo, New York

== Standings ==
1926–27 Eastern Collegiate ice hockey standings
	Intercollegiate							Overall					
	GP	W	L	T	Pct.	GF	GA	GP	W	L	T	GF	GA
Amherst	8	3	2	3	.563	9	9	8	3	2	3	9	9
Army	3	0	2	1	.167	5	13	4	0	3	1	7	20
Bates	8	4	3	1	.563	17	18	10	6	3	1	22	19
Boston College	2	1	1	0	.500	2	3	6	3	3	0	15	18
Boston University	7	2	4	1	.357	25	18	8	2	5	1	25	23
Bowdoin	8	3	5	0	.375	17	23	9	4	5	0	26	24
Brown	8	4	4	0	.500	16	26	8	4	4	0	16	26
Clarkson	9	8	1	0	.889	42	11	9	8	1	0	42	11
Colby	7	3	4	0	.429	16	12	7	3	4	0	16	12
Cornell	7	1	6	0	.143	10	23	7	1	6	0	10	23
Dartmouth	–	–	–	–	–	–	–	15	11	2	2	68	20
Hamilton	–	–	–	–	–	–	–	10	6	4	0	–	–
Harvard	8	7	0	1	.938	32	9	12	9	1	2	44	18
Massachusetts Agricultural	7	2	4	1	.357	5	10	7	2	4	1	5	10
Middlebury	6	6	0	0	1.000	25	7	6	6	0	0	25	7
MIT	8	3	4	1	.438	19	21	8	3	4	1	19	21
New Hampshire	6	6	0	0	1.000	22	7	6	6	0	0	22	7
Norwich	–	–	–	–	–	–	–	–	–	–	–	–	–
NYU	–	–	–	–	–	–	–	–	–	–	–	–	–
Princeton	6	2	4	0	.333	24	32	13	5	7	1	55	64
Providence	–	–	–	–	–	–	–	8	1	7	0	13	39
Rensselaer	–	–	–	–	–	–	–	3	0	2	1	–	–
St. Lawrence	–	–	–	–	–	–	–	7	3	4	0	–	–
Syracuse	–	–	–	–	–	–	–	–	–	–	–	–	–
Union	5	3	2	0	.600	18	14	5	3	2	0	18	14
Vermont	–	–	–	–	–	–	–	–	–	–	–	–	–
Williams	12	6	6	0	.500	38	40	12	6	6	0	38	40
Yale	12	8	3	1	.708	72	26	16	8	7	1	80	45
YMCA College	7	3	4	0	.429	16	19	7	3	4	0	16	19

== Schedule and results ==
Date	Opponent	Site	Result	Record
Regular Season
January 21	at YMCA College*	Eastern States Coliseum • Springfield, Massachusetts	L 1–3	0–1–0
January 25	at Massachusetts Agricultural*	Campus Pond • Amherst, Massachusetts	W 1–0	1–1–0
January 29	Rensselaer*	Pratt Field Rink • Amherst, Massachusetts	T 0–0	1–1–1
February 3	at Williams*	Sage Hall Rink • Williamstown, Massachusetts	W 1–0	2–1–1
February 4	at NYU*	Brooklyn Ice Palace • Brooklyn, New York	T 1–1	2–1–2
February 5	at Army*	Stuart Rink • West Point, New York	T 1–1 ^{2OT}	2–1–3
February 11	at Union*	Central Park Rink • Schenectady, New York	L 2–3 ^{2OT}	2–2–3
February 12	at Hamilton*	Russell Sage Rink • Clinton, New York	W 2–1	3–2–3
*Non-conference game.
