= 1926–27 Colby Mules men's ice hockey season =

- Conference: Independent
- Home ice: Colby Rink

Record
- Overall: 3–4–0
- Home: 1–0–0
- Road: 0–2–0
- Neutral: 2–2–0

Coaches and captains
- Head coach: Eddie Roundy
- Captain: Clarence Gould

The 1926–27 Colby Mules men's ice hockey season was the 6th season of play for the program. The Mules represented Colby College and were coached by Eddie Roundy in his 3rd season.

== Season ==
Colby entered the year with a considerable amount of pressure to perform. Not only had the team failed to win a single intercollegiate game since 1924, but continued pressure for the college to abandon ice hockey as a varsity sport in favor of basketball continued to gather strength. Worse, half the number of candidates showed up for the first practice as had the year before even through there were only three lettermen returning. The team's schedule was put together, however, with the way the weather had acted in recent years, there was little confidence that the team could play every game.

In spite of the ill omens swirling around the program, Colby got their season off on the right foot. Gould led the Mules to their first win over Bowdoin in almost four years with a 4-goal game, setting a program record in the process. Bob Scott, one of the three new starters, added two while Peacock's marker helped the team set an all-time high with 7 goals in a game. Also, unlike last season, coach Roundy made sure to have plenty of alternates on hand to keep live legs on the ice. Unfortunately, the weather would not cooperate and the team was forced to cancel in next four games, including two matched with local amateur clubs and home-and-home series with New Hampshire.

The next game for the Mules didn't come until the end of the month at Bates. Like their first match, this contest would not be counted towards the state championship and that appeared to be fortunate for the Mules. Bates took charge in the first and remained in command for most of the match. Colby held on for dear life but the inspired play of West in goal kept the Mules within striking distance. Down by 2 entering the third, the offense surged to the fore. Scott and Thiel scored to tie the game and force overtime. However, with both teams tired, there was an extended break before they resumed play. Near the end of the session, West was beaten clean off of a faceoff and the team was unable to mount a second comeback in the remaining time. A week later, the team welcomed Massachusetts Agricultural to town and the two fought a tightly contested game. The match had to be moved to the South End Arena but the neutral site didn't diminish Colby's defense. Peacock, Carlson and Thiel each were able to break up the Aggies' attacks while West continued to demonstrate that his girth was no impediment. In the middle of the second period, Thiel and Gould scored within a minute of the other for the only tallies in the match.

After the team returned from the exam break, they were scheduled to play Bowdoin on the 9th and 12th for the state championship series. Poor ice conditions forced the games to be reorganized and the home game was played first. Luckily, the Mules still had access to the South End Arena and were able to play the first game on time. Sturhahn joined form the freshman team, now that the exams were completed, and replaced Drummond on the wing. Drummond dropped back to defense, joining the already stout corp that continued its inspired play and stopped the Polar Bears from scoring for over 50 minutes. Unfortunately, the Mules' offense was unable to capitalize on the opportunity and regulation ended without a single goal despite several chances from both squads. After one scoreless 5-minute session, the tie was finally broken in the second when Bowdoin raced up the ice, 3-men-strong, and shot the puck into the top corner of the net after a brilliant bit of passing. After a slight delay and a bit of line juggling, the second match finally was held on the 11th despite constant snowfall and rough ice. The match was slowed as a result but the two teams remained evenly matched for the entire evening. The home team was able to score at the end of the second and start of the third to build a lead but Sturhahn cut into the advantage in the middle of the final frame. In an effort to tie the game, Colby sent its entire team on the attack and they finally managed to break down the Bowdoin defenses. The Mules fired several shots on goal but time ran out before they could find the equalizer and their chances at a state title were over.

After the two narrow defeats, Colby was hoping for a better result in their final home game of the season. They would have to overcome the absence of Fat West, who was out with a case of grippe, as well heavy snowfall that fell throughout the game. As a result, the match was divided into four 11-minute periods so that the ice could be cleaned more often. the visitors were in command early and took a lead late in the opening period. The Mules responded well in the second, evening the match after a second Bobcat goal. Drummond cut the lead in half before the end of the third and set up an exciting final period. While both team raced up and down the rink, searching for another marker, both netminders were on the top of their games and prevented any further scoring. With West back in goal and Sturhahn starting on defense, Colby's final match with Bates was moved to the Bartlett Street Rink as neither campus rink was capable of supporting a game. The hostile environs helped the Garnet build a 2-goal lead entering the third when their coach made a critical mistake. Believing the game had already been decided, the starting forwards were all replaced by alternates. That gave Colby a chance to go on the offense and they seized the opportunity. Sturhahn scored on an individual rush and, before the Bates starters could retake the ice, Gould tied the match after drawing the Bobcat goaltender away from the net. Though Bates was soon back to their full strength, the damage had been done. With a renewed confidence, the Colby defense upped their game held off the Bobcats to force overtime. Bates continued to pressure West in the extra sessions but the rotund netminder would not yield. Three 5-minute sessions passed without effect but, in the fourth, Colby was finally able to slay their dragon. Drummond broke the tie with a hard shot through a crowd for his only goal of the year. West kept up his impersonation of a wall, ending the match with 39 saves and giving the Mules their first win over Bates in program history.

Carl Anderson served as team manager.

== Roster ==
No.	Nat.	Player	Class	Pos	Height	Weight	DoB	Hometown	Previous team
	(United States)	J. Sten Carlson	Sophomore	D				Norwood, Massachusetts
	(United States)	E. Richard Drummond II	Junior	D/F			1907-09-14	Waterville, Maine
	(United States)	Clarence W. Gould (C)	Junior	C/LW			1904-02-23	Ipswich, Massachusetts
	(United States)	Rupert M. Irvine	Sophomore	G			1907-06-08	Caribou, Maine
	(United States)	Claes E. Johnson	Senior	C			1903-07-13	Norwood, Massachusetts
	(United States)	Albert U. Peacock	Senior	D				Providence, Rhode Island
	(United States)	Rudolph J. F. Pomerleau	Sophomore	RW			1907-08-22	Waterville, Maine
	(United States)	Robert W. Scott	Sophomore	D/F				Wilton, Maine
	(United States)	Edward M. Sturhahn	Freshman	D/F			1906-05-08	New Rochelle, New York
	(United States)	Henry E. Tattersall	Sophomore	C/LW/RW			1906-05-30	New Bedford, Massachusetts
	(United States)	Albert J. Thiel	Junior	D			1904-02-03	Canton, Massachusetts
	(United States)	George C. West	Junior	G			1907-09-04	Waterville, Maine

== Standings ==
1926–27 Eastern Collegiate ice hockey standings
	Intercollegiate							Overall					
	GP	W	L	T	Pct.	GF	GA	GP	W	L	T	GF	GA
Amherst	8	3	2	3	.563	9	9	8	3	2	3	9	9
Army	3	0	2	1	.167	5	13	4	0	3	1	7	20
Bates	8	4	3	1	.563	17	18	10	6	3	1	22	19
Boston College	2	1	1	0	.500	2	3	6	3	3	0	15	18
Boston University	7	2	4	1	.357	25	18	8	2	5	1	25	23
Bowdoin	8	3	5	0	.375	17	23	9	4	5	0	26	24
Brown	8	4	4	0	.500	16	26	8	4	4	0	16	26
Clarkson	9	8	1	0	.889	42	11	9	8	1	0	42	11
Colby	7	3	4	0	.429	16	12	7	3	4	0	16	12
Cornell	7	1	6	0	.143	10	23	7	1	6	0	10	23
Dartmouth	–	–	–	–	–	–	–	15	11	2	2	68	20
Hamilton	–	–	–	–	–	–	–	10	6	4	0	–	–
Harvard	8	7	0	1	.938	32	9	12	9	1	2	44	18
Massachusetts Agricultural	7	2	4	1	.357	5	10	7	2	4	1	5	10
Middlebury	6	6	0	0	1.000	25	7	6	6	0	0	25	7
MIT	8	3	4	1	.438	19	21	8	3	4	1	19	21
New Hampshire	6	6	0	0	1.000	22	7	6	6	0	0	22	7
Norwich	–	–	–	–	–	–	–	–	–	–	–	–	–
NYU	–	–	–	–	–	–	–	–	–	–	–	–	–
Princeton	6	2	4	0	.333	24	32	13	5	7	1	55	64
Providence	–	–	–	–	–	–	–	8	1	7	0	13	39
Rensselaer	–	–	–	–	–	–	–	3	0	2	1	–	–
St. Lawrence	–	–	–	–	–	–	–	7	3	4	0	–	–
Syracuse	–	–	–	–	–	–	–	–	–	–	–	–	–
Union	5	3	2	0	.600	18	14	5	3	2	0	18	14
Vermont	–	–	–	–	–	–	–	–	–	–	–	–	–
Williams	12	6	6	0	.500	38	40	12	6	6	0	38	40
Yale	12	8	3	1	.708	72	26	16	8	7	1	80	45
YMCA College	7	3	4	0	.429	16	19	7	3	4	0	16	19

== Schedule and results ==
Date	Opponent	Site	Decision	Result	Record
Regular Season
January 8	Bowdoin*	Colby Rink • Waterville, Maine	West	W 7–2	1–0–0
January 26	at Bates*	Bartlett Street Rink • Lewiston, Maine	West	L 2–3 ^{OT}	1–1–0
January 28	vs. Massachusetts Agricultural*	South End Arena • Waterville, Maine	West	W 2–0	2–1–0
February 8	vs. Bowdoin*	South End Arena • Waterville, Maine	West	L 0–1 ^{2OT}	2–2–0
February 11	at Bowdoin*	Delta Rink • Brunswick, Maine	West	L 1–2	2–3–0
February 16	vs. Bates*	Bartlett Street Rink • Lewiston, Maine	Irvine	L 1–2	2–4–0
February 22	vs. Bates*	Bartlett Street Rink • Lewiston, Maine	West	W 3–2 ^{4OT}	3–4–0
*Non-conference game.

Note: Colby referred to the first two games as exhibition matches because they were not counted towards the state championship. Both are official games.

== Scoring statistics ==
Name	Position	Games	Goals
Clarence Gould	C/LW	7	7
Bob Scott	D/LW/RW	7	3
Eddie Sturhahn	D/LW/RW	4	2
Al Thiel	D	6	2
Dick Drummond	D/C/RW	7	1
Al Peacock	D	7	1
Rupe Irvine	G	1	0
Claes Johnson	C	3	0
Rudolph Pomerleau	RW	4	0
Harry Tattersall	C/LW/RW	4	0
Fat West	G	6	0
Sten Carlson	D	7	0
Total			16
