= 1926–27 Bowdoin Polar Bears men's ice hockey season =

Men's ice hockey

- Conference: Independent
- Home ice: Delta Rink

Record
- Overall: 4–4–0
- Home: 2–0–0
- Road: 1–4–0
- Neutral: 1–0–0

Coaches and captains
- Head coach: Ben Houser
- Captain: Clem Cole

The 1926–27 Bowdoin Polar Bears men's ice hockey season was the 8th season of play for the program.

== Season ==
Bowdoin had a difficult time getting on the ice prior to the first game and was forced to find other methods to get ready for the season. Coach Houser had invented a training regimen that mixed football, soccer and basketball called "Houserball" that the team used to keep in shape. The team lost several key members of last year's squad that it would find difficult to replace as three regulars from the freshman team (Rice, Howland and Clark) were ineligible until at least February.

The team opened with a practice game against the Westbrook Ramblers, hoping that the match would set them up for the beginning of the in-state series. However, due to the weakness of their opponent, Bowdoin didn't get much benefit out of the game. The Bears had their way with the Ramblers with goals from six different players. Sure enough, once the first game rolled around, the lack of practice and talent showed that the Polar Bears weren't up to their previous standard. Bowdoin was outplayed by Colby all game and were unable to withstand the physicality from the Mules, coming out on the short end of a 2–7 drubbing. Lord played a credible game in goal but he received little help from the defense. The Bears were better in their next game and played New Hampshire close until the Wildcats pulled away with a pair near the end of the game. Lord was again the best player for the team, making 29 saves in the match.

The Polar Bears played and exhibition match with Bates before heading south on a trip to Rhode Island. The Rhode Island Auditorium had opened the previous February and two college teams were immediately formed. Bowdoin earned a split against these inexperienced teams but the ice time did wonders for the Bears as they headed into the exam break. The team returned from the layoff with a rematch against Colby and played a much stronger game the second time around. The lineup had been rearranged in the interim with Cole and Walsh moving to wing while Thayer was shifted to center. Stone and Forsythe were now the starting defensive unit and they proved to be much more effecting in breaking up the Mules' attack. Playing on rough ice with snow falling around them, Bowdoin allowed just 1 goal to Colby at the very end of the game. The team was also buoyed by the first appearances of Howland, Parker and Dick Thayer's younger brother and the new arrivals helped carry the team to victory. The following day, Bowdoin travelled to play off the series and the two fought through another defensive slug fest with no goals in regulation. Bowdoin finally broke the tie in the second overtime and eliminated Colby from championship contention.

The Bates series began the following week and Bowdoin's defense was again the strength of the team. Dick Thayer demonstrates a quickness that the Bears were sorely in need of but it wasn't enough to stop the Bobcats from taking the game. A rematch was supposed to take place in Brunswick the following weekend, however, poor ice called the game to be cancelled and a return match was never held. The lone win by Bates was allowed to stand and enabled the Bobcats to win the state title.

Calvin Hubbard served as team manager.

== Roster ==
No.	Nat.	Player	Class	Pos	Height	Weight	DoB	Hometown	Previous team
	(United States)	Paul S. Andrews	Sophomore	D			1907-01-19	Clinton, Maine
	(United States)	Gordon W. Bryant	Junior	D/C			1906-03-08	Boston, Massachusetts
	(United States)	Clarence L. Cole (C)	Senior	D/LW			1905-06-28	Limington, Maine
	(United States)	J. Reginald Forsythe	Senior	D/F			1902-11-12	Middlebury, Vermont
	(United States)	John D. Frates	Sophomore	C/LW/RW			1906-05-17	Portland, Maine
	(United States)	Winslow R. Howland	Sophomore	G			1906-07-17	Framingham, Massachusetts
	(United States)	John A. Lord	Senior	G			1904-08-18	Foxboro, Massachusetts
	(United States)	James M. Parker	Freshman	RW			1908-03-31	Portland, Maine
	(United States)	Clark S. Sears	Junior	RW			1906-10-15	Danvers, Massachusetts
	(United States)	Stuart R. Stone	Freshman	D			1906-08-27	Newton, Massachusetts
	(United States)	Harry B. Thayer Jr.	Freshman	RW			1907-11-08	Boston, Massachusetts
	(United States)	Richard S. Thayer	Junior	C/LW			1905-10-31	Stoneham, Massachusetts
	(United States)	Paul Tiemer	Junior	C			1905-06-11	Orange, New Jersey
	(United States)	William L. Walsh	Junior	D/LW			1905-02-24	Lewiston, Maine
	(United States)	Wendell Ward	Sophomore	RW			1907-06-23	Houlton, Maine

== Standings ==
1926–27 Eastern Collegiate ice hockey standings
	Intercollegiate							Overall					
	GP	W	L	T	Pct.	GF	GA	GP	W	L	T	GF	GA
Amherst	8	3	2	3	.563	9	9	8	3	2	3	9	9
Army	3	0	2	1	.167	5	13	4	0	3	1	7	20
Bates	8	4	3	1	.563	17	18	10	6	3	1	22	19
Boston College	2	1	1	0	.500	2	3	6	3	3	0	15	18
Boston University	7	2	4	1	.357	25	18	8	2	5	1	25	23
Bowdoin	8	3	5	0	.375	17	23	9	4	5	0	26	24
Brown	8	4	4	0	.500	16	26	8	4	4	0	16	26
Clarkson	9	8	1	0	.889	42	11	9	8	1	0	42	11
Colby	7	3	4	0	.429	16	12	7	3	4	0	16	12
Cornell	7	1	6	0	.143	10	23	7	1	6	0	10	23
Dartmouth	–	–	–	–	–	–	–	15	11	2	2	68	20
Hamilton	–	–	–	–	–	–	–	10	6	4	0	–	–
Harvard	8	7	0	1	.938	32	9	12	9	1	2	44	18
Massachusetts Agricultural	7	2	4	1	.357	5	10	7	2	4	1	5	10
Middlebury	6	6	0	0	1.000	25	7	6	6	0	0	25	7
MIT	8	3	4	1	.438	19	21	8	3	4	1	19	21
New Hampshire	6	6	0	0	1.000	22	7	6	6	0	0	22	7
Norwich	–	–	–	–	–	–	–	–	–	–	–	–	–
NYU	–	–	–	–	–	–	–	–	–	–	–	–	–
Princeton	6	2	4	0	.333	24	32	13	5	7	1	55	64
Providence	–	–	–	–	–	–	–	8	1	7	0	13	39
Rensselaer	–	–	–	–	–	–	–	3	0	2	1	–	–
St. Lawrence	–	–	–	–	–	–	–	7	3	4	0	–	–
Syracuse	–	–	–	–	–	–	–	–	–	–	–	–	–
Union	5	3	2	0	.600	18	14	5	3	2	0	18	14
Vermont	–	–	–	–	–	–	–	–	–	–	–	–	–
Williams	12	6	6	0	.500	38	40	12	6	6	0	38	40
Yale	12	8	3	1	.708	72	26	16	8	7	1	80	45
YMCA College	7	3	4	0	.429	16	19	7	3	4	0	16	19

== Schedule and results ==
Date	Opponent	Site	Result	Record
Regular Season
January 6	Westbrook Ramblers*	Delta Rink • Brunswick, Maine	W 9–1	1–0–0
January 8 ^{†}	at Colby*	Colby Rink • Waterville, Maine	L 2–7	1–1–0
January 12	at New Hampshire*	UNH Ice Rink • Durham, New Hampshire	L 1–4	1–2–0
January 18 ^{†}	Bates*	Delta Rink • Brunswick, Maine	L 5–6	1–3–0
January 21	at Providence*	Rhode Island Auditorium • Providence, Rhode Island	W 4–1	2–3–0
January 22	at Brown*	Rhode Island Auditorium • Providence, Rhode Island	L 1–2	2–4–0
February 8	vs. Colby*	South End Arena • Waterville, Maine	W 1–0 ^{2OT}	3–4–0
February 11	Colby*	Delta Rink • Brunswick, Maine	W 2–1	4–4–0
February 19	at Bates*	Bartlett Street Rink • Lewiston, Maine	L 1–2	4–5–0
*Non-conference game.

† Bates and Colby records indicate the first games as exhibition matches because they were not counted towards the state championship. They are both official matches.
