= 1926–27 Williams Ephs men's ice hockey season =

College ice hockey team season

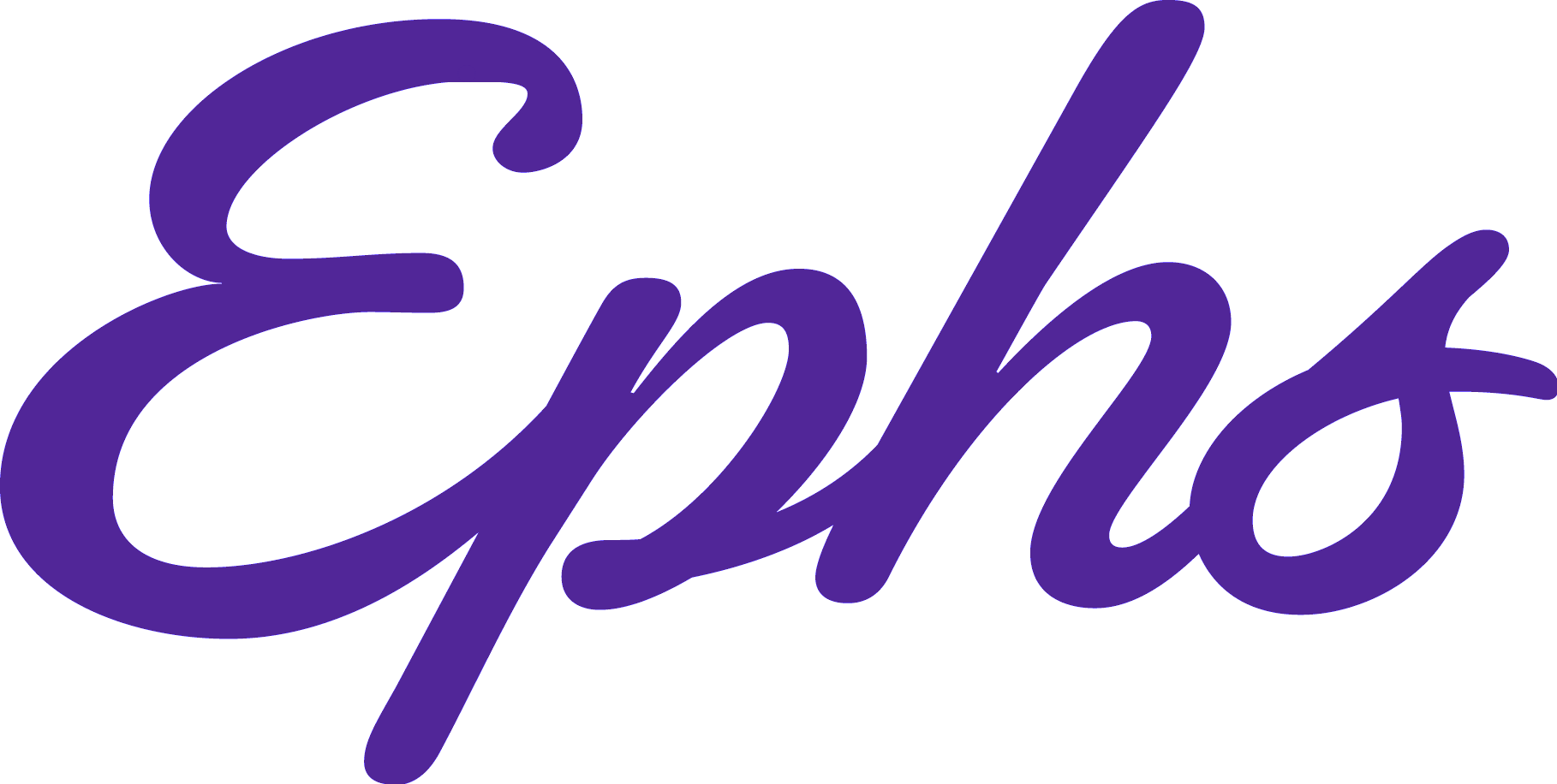
- Conference: Independent
- Home ice: Sage Hall Rink

Record
- Overall: 6–6–0
- Home: 2–1–0
- Road: 3–2–0
- Neutral: 1–3–0

Coaches and captains
- Head coach: Leo Bellerose
- Captain: Leonard Smith

The 1926–27 Williams Ephs men's ice hockey season was the 24th season of play for the program.

== Season ==
As the team began to meet in late-November, the Ephs new they had several challenges to overcome if they wanted to get anywhere close to the success they had seen in '26. First, the team was now led by Leo Bellerose, a professor of the French language who was recently hired by the college. With its 4th head coach in the past 5 seasons, the players would have to adapt to a new style once more. The lineup, however, provided a bigger test as four of the team's starters had now graduated. Replacing those major pieces would be slightly easier than normal as many of the prospective athletes had gotten ice time last season. The toughest obstacle was the same as it always had been for Williams: the weather. A late winter left the team without any usable ice when they started training and the team was forced into the college gymnasium. The temperature dropped low enough in December and the team used Leake's Pond as their practice facility once the surface froze to a satisfactory degree.

After three days of practice at the Springfield Arena, Williams arrived in Lake Placid on 26 December. The team had a difficult time adjusting to the larger skating surfaces and went through several more days of intense practice as they got themselves ready for the 4-game series with Dartmouth. The Ephs were facing their old bench boss, J. Philip Bower, and the Indians' coach knew many of the Purple players. That didn't stop Williams from giving the Green a tough test as the two fought through three close games. Dartmouth won the first three matches, greatly buoyed by the strength of All-American Myles Lane, but Williams was able to get better as their ice time increased as the Ephs were able to pull out a win in the final contest.

The team was able to get a short rest in before their next game and Williams had seemingly no difficulty from Rensselaer. Despite playing on a far smaller surface than they had at Lake Placid, the Ephs poured 8 goals into the RPI cage. A hat-trick from Howe paced all players while the forward unit of Brigham, Blaney and Smith accounted for the other five. Other than playing at home, there was little change in the next game as Williams was once more led by three goals from a defenseman. This time it was Austin's chance to shine and he led the team to a fairly easy win over YMCA College. The following game gave Williams an unexpected challenge as the team found itself down 0–2 in the second. Though a steady snowfall slowed the pace of play, Union didn't seem to mind and got out to an early lead. Once the precipitation began to peter out, the Ephs charged back to tie the game. The Dutchmen regained the lead at the start of the third but Williams kept attacking and were able to score twice before the end of regulation to escape with a win.

Warm weather hit the region afterwards and kept the team off of the ice. Not only were several games cancelled but the Ephs weren't able to practice and keep us their strengths. The next game for Williams didn't happen until early February and, by the time the faced off against Amherst, the ice on the Sage Hall Rink was soft but usable. The game was a slog and played mostly in the Lord Jeffs' end but the Ephs were unable to capitalize. A poor defensive play at the start of the second allowed Amherst to score the only goal of the game and drew the ire of the assembled crowd. The next night, Williams was in Ithaca and was again the better team on the ice. The goal guard for Cornell was the only thing standing in the way of the Ephs taking a sizable lead and the score sat tied at 2-all after regulation. Early in the game, Hutchins received a minor penalty for freezing the puck (illegal at the time) and was sent off the ice. Austin and Blaney subbed in goal while the rest of the team just skated the puck around the ice to prevent any shots from getting on goal. The game was also memorable for being played as four 15-minute quarters. In the first of the two 5-minute overtimes the teams went scoreless. Blaney made sure there was no repeat in the second when he scored twice to complete his hat-trick and win the game for the Ephs. One day on, the team was taking on Syracuse and soundly defeated the hapless Orangemen. While Williams was likely the better of the two, Syracuse was missing several players and had difficulty mustering any kind of challenge for the Ephs. Soft ice was the only thing that held the Purple back but even so, Austin's secon hat-trick of the season was more than enough to secure a victory.

The next game for the team saw the Ephs renew their annual meeting with Yale. Williams was a match for the Elis in the early part of the game, scoring first and then later tying the score at 2-all. 1,800 watched as the teams fought on sticky ice in a humid building that seemed to drag the Purple down as the game wore on. The game was even at about the halfway point but Yale, employing a bevy of alternates, was able to outlast Williams and scored the final five goals to win in convincing fashion. Afterwards, several more games were cancelled, including the rematch with Amherst, all due to a lack of ice in the region. The warm weather also, again, kept the team from being able to practice so that, by the time they headed down to New Jersey to take on Princeton, the team was in no shape to win. Predictably, the team was thumped by the Tigers, losing 3–9. Blaney was one of the few bright sports for the team as he scored twice but that did little to help the team avoid defeat. Captain Leonard Smith was unavailable for the game, however, his younger brother Darwin stepped in at Left Wing.

Berkley Hotchkiss served as team manager with William Eaton as his assistant.

== Roster ==
No.	Nat.	Player	Class	Pos	Height	Weight	DoB	Hometown	Previous team
	(United States)	Francis D. Austin	Junior	G/D				Douglaston, New York
	(United States)	Talcott M. Banks Jr.	Junior	D/LW				Williamstown, Massachusetts
	(United States)	Walter G. Bird	Sophomore				1906-04-08	New York, New York
	(United States)	William O. Blaney	Junior	G/F			1905-09-15	Waban, Massachusetts
	(United States)	H. Prescott Brigham Jr.	Sophomore	C/LW				West Newton, Massachusetts
	(United States)	Robert H. Field	Sophomore	C				Providence, Rhode Island
	(United States)	Arthur B. Hellyer	Sophomore	D/LW				Riverside, Illinois
	(United States)	Dunton Howe	Sophomore	D				Providence, Rhode Island
	(United States)	Franklin K. Hoyt	Freshman	LW			1907-09-11	West Newton, Massachusetts
	(United States)	Curtis M. Hutchins	Junior	G			1907-04-23	Newton, Massachusetts
	(United States)	George L. Nye	Sophomore	C/LW/RW				Minneapolis, Minnesota
	(United States)	Dwight C. Shepler	Junior	RW			1905-08-11	Newton Center, Massachusetts
	(United States)	Darwin A. Smith	Freshman	RW			1907-10-14	Brooklyn, New York
	(United States)	Leonard H. Smith Jr. (C)	Senior	RW			1904-02-03	Brooklyn, New York
	(United States)	Preston H. Watters	Sophomore				1907-01-12	West Roxbury, Massachusetts

== Standings ==
1926–27 Eastern Collegiate ice hockey standings
	Intercollegiate							Overall					
	GP	W	L	T	Pct.	GF	GA	GP	W	L	T	GF	GA
Amherst	8	3	2	3	.563	9	9	8	3	2	3	9	9
Army	3	0	2	1	.167	5	13	4	0	3	1	7	20
Bates	8	4	3	1	.563	17	18	10	6	3	1	22	19
Boston College	2	1	1	0	.500	2	3	6	3	3	0	15	18
Boston University	7	2	4	1	.357	25	18	8	2	5	1	25	23
Bowdoin	8	3	5	0	.375	17	23	9	4	5	0	26	24
Brown	8	4	4	0	.500	16	26	8	4	4	0	16	26
Clarkson	9	8	1	0	.889	42	11	9	8	1	0	42	11
Colby	7	3	4	0	.429	16	12	7	3	4	0	16	12
Cornell	7	1	6	0	.143	10	23	7	1	6	0	10	23
Dartmouth	–	–	–	–	–	–	–	15	11	2	2	68	20
Hamilton	–	–	–	–	–	–	–	10	6	4	0	–	–
Harvard	8	7	0	1	.938	32	9	12	9	1	2	44	18
Massachusetts Agricultural	7	2	4	1	.357	5	10	7	2	4	1	5	10
Middlebury	6	6	0	0	1.000	25	7	6	6	0	0	25	7
MIT	8	3	4	1	.438	19	21	8	3	4	1	19	21
New Hampshire	6	6	0	0	1.000	22	7	6	6	0	0	22	7
Norwich	–	–	–	–	–	–	–	–	–	–	–	–	–
NYU	–	–	–	–	–	–	–	–	–	–	–	–	–
Princeton	6	2	4	0	.333	24	32	13	5	7	1	55	64
Providence	–	–	–	–	–	–	–	8	1	7	0	13	39
Rensselaer	–	–	–	–	–	–	–	3	0	2	1	–	–
St. Lawrence	–	–	–	–	–	–	–	7	3	4	0	–	–
Syracuse	–	–	–	–	–	–	–	–	–	–	–	–	–
Union	5	3	2	0	.600	18	14	5	3	2	0	18	14
Vermont	–	–	–	–	–	–	–	–	–	–	–	–	–
Williams	12	6	6	0	.500	38	40	12	6	6	0	38	40
Yale	12	8	3	1	.708	72	26	16	8	7	1	80	45
YMCA College	7	3	4	0	.429	16	19	7	3	4	0	16	19

== Schedule and results ==
Date	Opponent	Site	Result	Record
Regular Season
December 29	vs. Dartmouth*	Lake Placid Rink • Lake Placid, New York	L 1–2	0–1–0
December 30	vs. Dartmouth*	Lake Placid Rink • Lake Placid, New York	L 0–8	0–1–0
December 31	vs. Dartmouth*	Lake Placid Rink • Lake Placid, New York	L 1–4	0–3–0
January 1	vs. Dartmouth*	Lake Placid Rink • Lake Placid, New York	W 4–2	1–3–0
January 8	at Rensselaer*	RPI Rink • Troy, New York	W 8–1	2–3–0
January 12	YMCA College*	Sage Hall Rink • Williamstown, Massachusetts	W 6–1	3–3–0
January 15	Union*	Sage Hall Rink • Williamstown, Massachusetts	W 4–3	4–3–0
February 3	Amherst*	Sage Hall Rink • Williamstown, Massachusetts	L 0–1	4–4–0
February 4	at Cornell*	Beebe Lake • Ithaca, New York	W 4–2	5–4–0
February 5	at Syracuse*	Syracuse, New York	W 5–0	6–4–0
February 9	at Yale*	New Haven Arena • New Haven, Connecticut	L 2–7	6–5–0
February 26	at Princeton*	Hobey Baker Memorial Rink • Princeton, New Jersey	L 3–9	6–6–0
*Non-conference game.

== Scoring statistics ==
Name	Position	Games	Goals
William Blaney	G/C	12	11
Francis Austin	G/D	12	9
Prescott Brigham	C/LW	12	6
Leonard Smith	RW	11	5
Dunton Howe	D	12	5
Arthur Hellyer	D/LW	11	1
Walter Bird	Substitute	1	0
Darwin Smith	RW	1	0
Preston Watters	Substitute	1	0
Jim Hoyt	LW	2	0
Talcott Banks	D/LW	4	0
George Nye	C/LW/RW	5	0
Robert Field	C	6	0
Dwight Shepler	RW	10	0
Curtis Hutchins	G	12	0
Total			37

Note: The scorer of the first goal on January 1 was not reported.
