= 1926–27 Middlebury Panthers men's ice hockey season =

- Conference: Independent
- Home ice: Middlebury Rink

Record
- Overall: 6–0–0
- Home: 3–0–0
- Road: 3–0–0

Coaches and captains
- Head coach: Carleton Simmons
- Captain: Carleton Simmons

The 1926–27 Middlebury Panthers men's ice hockey season was the 5th season of play for the program. The Panthers were led by player/coach by Carleton Simmons in his 1st season.

== Season ==
For the third consecutive season, the ice hockey program was led by a team captain.[1] In this season, Carleton Simmons assumed the role. The team experienced significant roster changes on defense, as both starting defensemen and the starting goaltender from the previous season had graduated, resulting in limited experience in defensive positions. However, several returning offensive players provided continuity for the team.

The team opened their schedule with a road trip to Hamilton once again. Middlebury was forced to play without their captain, who was unavailable due to injury, but they did see the return of both Hal Whittemore and Red Hill who had improved their grades enough to become eligible once more. Whittemore and Kelley both recorded hat-tricks to give the team a sizable margin for error. Bossert and Gruggel, both of whom had played forward the year before, filled in on defense and became more accustomed to the role as the game went on. By the time the third period rolled around, Middlebury was looked like a well-oiled machine and the team was able to effectively break up any additional scoring chances by the home squad.

After the fairly stunning win, Simmons returned to the lineup which was still limited when the team travelled to take on Providence. The Friars were a new program but were buoyed by the presence of the Rhode Island Auditorium, giving them consistent ice to mold their team into an effective unit. The Friars showed as much in the defensive struggle that resulted. Whittemore opened the scoring in the first three minutes of the game but nothing the Panthers did afterwards produced another goal. Fortunately, Middlebury's blueline looked like they were up to the challenge and held Providence off the scoresheet until the waning moment of the game. Unable to get close to the Panther cage, Providence threw the puck from long range in desperation and got a lucky shot from center ice that somehow eluded Finnegan and tied the match with three minutes to play. Whittemore's second goal came just over a minute into overtime while Kelley doubled the lead four minutes later. Providence scored on a mad dash up the ice shortly afterwards. The Friars nearly tied the match with a minute left when a loose puck was laying in front of a yawning cage but Gruggle got his stick on it first to clear it out of danger. After the match, the contest with Amherst was scrapped due to soft ice. Weather prevented the team from playing another match until February but the time off did allow Simmons to fully recover.

Middlebury opened its in-state series at Vermont and demonstrated that they were the superior team. The offense was the star of the show as the Panthers routinely charged down the ice and put pressure on the home team all evening. Vermont's defense held strong in the first two periods but finally succumbed in the third, surrendering three goals in the final period. Whittemore and Kelley, who had swapped positions, each scored twice while Simmons recorded his first of the season. Three days later, the team played its first home game of the season and delivered against Massachusetts Agricultural. The Aggies were hopelessly outgunned by the Panthers, having to play defense for nearly the entire game. Whittemore's opening tally stood as the game winner while Hill and Gruggel both nabbed their first of the year.

In their rematch with Vermont, Middlebury was an even more dominant force. In the first two periods, Whittemore recorded his second hat-trick of the season while the team possessed a 5–0 lead. Vermont was hemmed in their own zone for virtually the entire 30 minutes and induced captain Simmons to let the reserves finally get into a game. Jason, Melbye and McLeod all got their first taste of varsity play as the starting forwards and goaltender took a seat. Gruggel and Bossert remained in the match to prevent any rushes from the visitors but that needn't have worried. The only goal came from McLeod bringing the Panther's total up to six. That weekend the weather began to turn and a sunny day softened the rink's ice. Their game with Norwich was bogged down with played required to walk on the ice more than skate. The match saw Middlebury find itself behind for just the second time all season when a shot beat Finnegan 45 seconds into the game. The Panthers had to slog through the poor conditions and a stronger-than-expected offense from the Cadets but Kelley managed the tying goal at the end of the first. The situation with the ice was so bad that both teams agreed to shorten the final two periods to just 10 minutes. In the second frame, Whittemore fired the puck from the wall to beat the Norwich netminder. That marker was fortunate for Middlebury as the slush and water that accumulated afterwards made moving the puck all but impossible. Middlebury contented itself to play defense for the final period, however, an injury to Whittemore was bad enough to knock him out of the match.

Weather conditions did not improve after the Norwich game. Every match left on their schedule had to be abandoned, curtailing the best season the program had ever seen. Despite the reduced number of contests, Middlebury was able to lay claim on both the Vermont State Championship and the College (small school) Championship, sharing an undefeated record with New Hampshire. The club was so well-regarded by the school that the student body voted to promote the ice hockey team to major-status on March 1, providing a fitting end for their campaign.

H. Carleton Seymour served as team manager with Harold E. Kinne as his assistant.

== Roster ==
No.	Nat.	Player	Class	Pos	Height	Weight	DoB	Hometown	Previous team
	(United States)	Frederick G. Bossert	Sophomore	D			1907-08-15	Brooklyn, New York
	(United States)	Joseph L. Finnegan	Senior	G			1901-11-10	Cambridge, Massachusetts
	(United States)	Folke Gruggel	Sophomore	D			1908-02-28	Beechhurst, New York
	(United States)	Ralph A. Hill	Junior	LW/RW			1906-03-23	Walpole, Massachusetts
	(United States)	Otis R. Jason	Sophomore	C			1908-02-09	Cohasset, Massachusetts
	(United States)	Stillman F. Kelley II	Sophomore	C/LW			1906-06-03	Lexington, Massachusetts
	(United States)	Robert P. McLeod	Freshman	RW			1908-03-28	Natick, Massachusetts
	(United States)	Gordon H. Melbye	Freshman	G			1907-05-02	Norfolk, Massachusetts
	(United States)	Carleton H. Simmons (C)	Junior	LW/RW			1905-06-04	Wellesley Hills, Massachusetts
	(United States)	Harold B. Whittemore	Junior	C/RW			1903-05-10	Brookline, Massachusetts

== Standings ==
1926–27 Eastern Collegiate ice hockey standings
	Intercollegiate							Overall					
	GP	W	L	T	Pct.	GF	GA	GP	W	L	T	GF	GA
Amherst	8	3	2	3	.563	9	9	8	3	2	3	9	9
Army	3	0	2	1	.167	5	13	4	0	3	1	7	20
Bates	8	4	3	1	.563	17	18	10	6	3	1	22	19
Boston College	2	1	1	0	.500	2	3	6	3	3	0	15	18
Boston University	7	2	4	1	.357	25	18	8	2	5	1	25	23
Bowdoin	8	3	5	0	.375	17	23	9	4	5	0	26	24
Brown	8	4	4	0	.500	16	26	8	4	4	0	16	26
Clarkson	9	8	1	0	.889	42	11	9	8	1	0	42	11
Colby	7	3	4	0	.429	16	12	7	3	4	0	16	12
Cornell	7	1	6	0	.143	10	23	7	1	6	0	10	23
Dartmouth	–	–	–	–	–	–	–	15	11	2	2	68	20
Hamilton	–	–	–	–	–	–	–	10	6	4	0	–	–
Harvard	8	7	0	1	.938	32	9	12	9	1	2	44	18
Massachusetts Agricultural	7	2	4	1	.357	5	10	7	2	4	1	5	10
Middlebury	6	6	0	0	1.000	25	7	6	6	0	0	25	7
MIT	8	3	4	1	.438	19	21	8	3	4	1	19	21
New Hampshire	6	6	0	0	1.000	22	7	6	6	0	0	22	7
Norwich	–	–	–	–	–	–	–	–	–	–	–	–	–
NYU	–	–	–	–	–	–	–	–	–	–	–	–	–
Princeton	6	2	4	0	.333	24	32	13	5	7	1	55	64
Providence	–	–	–	–	–	–	–	8	1	7	0	13	39
Rensselaer	–	–	–	–	–	–	–	3	0	2	1	–	–
St. Lawrence	–	–	–	–	–	–	–	7	3	4	0	–	–
Syracuse	–	–	–	–	–	–	–	–	–	–	–	–	–
Union	5	3	2	0	.600	18	14	5	3	2	0	18	14
Vermont	–	–	–	–	–	–	–	–	–	–	–	–	–
Williams	12	6	6	0	.500	38	40	12	6	6	0	38	40
Yale	12	8	3	1	.708	72	26	16	8	7	1	80	45
YMCA College	7	3	4	0	.429	16	19	7	3	4	0	16	19

== Schedule and results ==
Date	Opponent	Site	Decision	Result	Record
Regular Season
December 18	at Hamilton*	Russell Sage Rink • Clinton, New York	Finnegan	W 6–3	1–0–0
January 15	at Providence*	Rhode Island Auditorium • Providence, Rhode Island	Finnegan	W 3–2 ^{OT}	2–0–0
February 2	at Vermont*	Centennial Rink • Burlington, Vermont	Finnegan	W 5–1	3–0–0
February 4	Massachusetts Agricultural*	Middlebury Rink • Middlebury, Vermont	Finnegan	W 3–0	4–0–0
February 9	Vermont*	Middlebury Rink • Middlebury, Vermont	Finnegan	W 6–0	5–0–0
February 12	Norwich*	Middlebury Rink • Middlebury, Vermont	Finnegan	W 2–1	6–0–0
*Non-conference game.

== Scoring statistics ==
Name	Position	Games	Goals
Hal Whittemore	C/RW	6	12
Still Kelley	C/LW	6	8
Carleton Simmons	LW/RW	5	2
Bob McLeod	RW	1	1
Barney Gruggle	D	6	1
Red Hill	LW/RW	6	1
Shorty Jason	C	1	0
Gordon Melbye	G	1	0
Fred Bossert	D	6	0
Joe Finnegan	G	6	0
Total			25

== Goaltending statistics ==
Name	Games	Minutes	Wins	Losses	Ties	Goals Against	Saves	Shut Outs	SV %	GAA
Gordon Melbye	1	10	0	0	0	0		0		0.00
Joe Finnegan	6	260	6	0	0	7		1		1.21
Total	6	270	6	0	0	7		2		1.17

Note: Finnegan and Melbye shared the shutout on February 9.
Note: goals against average is based upon a 45-minute regulation game.
