= 1926–27 United States collegiate men's ice hockey season =

- Duration: December 1926– March 1927
- East Collegiate champion: Harvard
- West Collegiate champion: None

The 33rd season of collegiate ice hockey in the United States was played in 1926–27.

== Regular season ==
=== Standings ===
1926–27 Eastern Collegiate ice hockey standings
	Intercollegiate							Overall					
	GP	W	L	T	Pct.	GF	GA	GP	W	L	T	GF	GA
Amherst	8	3	2	3	.563	9	9	8	3	2	3	9	9
Army	3	0	2	1	.167	5	13	4	0	3	1	7	20
Bates	8	4	3	1	.563	17	18	10	6	3	1	22	19
Boston College	2	1	1	0	.500	2	3	6	3	3	0	15	18
Boston University	7	2	4	1	.357	25	18	8	2	5	1	25	23
Bowdoin	8	3	5	0	.375	17	23	9	4	5	0	26	24
Brown	8	4	4	0	.500	16	26	8	4	4	0	16	26
Clarkson	9	8	1	0	.889	42	11	9	8	1	0	42	11
Colby	7	3	4	0	.429	16	12	7	3	4	0	16	12
Cornell	7	1	6	0	.143	10	23	7	1	6	0	10	23
Dartmouth	–	–	–	–	–	–	–	15	11	2	2	68	20
Hamilton	–	–	–	–	–	–	–	10	6	4	0	–	–
Harvard	8	7	0	1	.938	32	9	12	9	1	2	44	18
Massachusetts Agricultural	7	2	4	1	.357	5	10	7	2	4	1	5	10
Middlebury	6	6	0	0	1.000	25	7	6	6	0	0	25	7
MIT	8	3	4	1	.438	19	21	8	3	4	1	19	21
New Hampshire	6	6	0	0	1.000	22	7	6	6	0	0	22	7
Norwich	–	–	–	–	–	–	–	–	–	–	–	–	–
NYU	–	–	–	–	–	–	–	–	–	–	–	–	–
Princeton	6	2	4	0	.333	24	32	13	5	7	1	55	64
Providence	–	–	–	–	–	–	–	8	1	7	0	13	39
Rensselaer	–	–	–	–	–	–	–	3	0	2	1	–	–
St. Lawrence	–	–	–	–	–	–	–	7	3	4	0	–	–
Syracuse	–	–	–	–	–	–	–	–	–	–	–	–	–
Union	5	3	2	0	.600	18	14	5	3	2	0	18	14
Vermont	–	–	–	–	–	–	–	–	–	–	–	–	–
Williams	12	6	6	0	.500	38	40	12	6	6	0	38	40
Yale	12	8	3	1	.708	72	26	16	8	7	1	80	45
YMCA College	7	3	4	0	.429	16	19	7	3	4	0	16	19

1926–27 Western Collegiate ice hockey standings
	Intercollegiate							Overall					
	GP	W	L	T	Pct.	GF	GA	GP	W	L	T	GF	GA
Marquette	1	0	1	0	.000	4	7	7	5	2	0	33	18
Michigan College of Mines	6	5	1	0	.833	21	8	6	5	1	0	21	8
Michigan State	–	–	–	–	–	–	–	4	1	3	0	7	9
North Dakota Agricultural	–	–	–	–	–	–	–	–	–	–	–	–	–
Notre Dame	8	2	6	0	.250	8	29	11	3	7	1	11	34

1926–27 Big Ten standings
	Conference							Overall					
	GP	W	L	T	PTS	GF	GA	GP	W	L	T	GF	GA
Michigan †	8	6	2	0	.750	10	6	13	9	4	0	17	12
Minnesota †	8	6	2	0	.750	15	7	15	9	6	0	27	19
Wisconsin	8	0	8	0	.000	3	15	10	1	9	0	–	–
† indicates conference champion

1926–27 Minnesota Intercollegiate Athletic Conference ice hockey standings
	Conference							Overall					
	GP	W	L	T	PTS	GF	GA	GP	W	L	T	GF	GA
Augsburg	–	–	–	–	–	–	–	4	4	0	0	19	1
Macalester	–	–	–	–	–	–	–	6	0	4	2	4	20
St. Thomas	–	–	–	–	–	–	–	13	5	8	0	27	33
No Champion Named

1926–27 Southern California Ice Hockey League standings
	Conference							Overall					
	GP	W	L	T	PTS	GF	GA	GP	W	L	T	GF	GA
California Southern Campus †	6	6	0	0	1.000	19	7	7	6	1	0	21	11
USC	4	3	1	0	.750	17	11	4	2	2	0	10	15
Occidental	6	1	5	0	.167	15	21	7	2	5	0	19	22
Southwestern Law	6	1	5	0	.167	12	24	5	1	4	0	12	25
† indicates conference champion Note: USC and Southwestern Law played an exhibition match that was included in league standings.
