= 1929–30 Yale Bulldogs men's ice hockey season =

Eastern Collegiate, co-Champion
- Conference: Independent
- Home ice: New Haven Arena

Record
- Overall: 17–1–1
- Home: 10–1–1
- Road: 2–0–0
- Neutral: 5–0–0

Coaches and captains
- Head coach: Lawrence Noble
- Assistant coaches: Holcomb York; Richard Vaughan
- Captain: Bob Wilson

The 1929–30 Yale Bulldogs men's ice hockey season was the 35th season of play for the program. The Bulldogs represented Yale University and were coached by Lawrence Noble in his 2nd season.

== Season ==
After finally regaining the title as the best hockey team in the east, coach Noble arranged for the team to begin training earlier than normal. The Elis convened for the first practice before Thanksgiving rather than wait for early December. Approximately 30 men were dressed and ready to carry on the tradition and were initially instructed by assistant coaches Richard Vaughan (class of '28) and Holcomb York (class of '17). The two men were both former members of the team and would be leading the freshman and junior varsity teams respectively. Back for the initial practice were several key members of the championship team, including Ding Palmer and Frank Farrell, however, several players were missing thanks in part to their participation with other programs. The early practices were established primarily as a way of getting those players who did not play on fall teams into shape and to introduce the sophomores to their first taste of varsity hockey. Seniors, like Palmer and Jennison, were relied on more as coaches than players during this time. The first full practice didn't occur until after the completion of the football season and the arrival of head coach Lawrence Noble on November 25.

It wasn't until the beginning of December that the full complement of players was assembled. Only three players from last year's team had been lost to graduation, two of them starters, while most of the men who had appeared for the club in '29 were ready to earn their shot for '30. Because the school was utilizing a JV team for the first time, players who were cut from the varsity roster would still have an opportunity to remain in game shape and move up later in the season. Once team captain Bob Wilson had recovered from a leg injury he had suffered during the football season, he reported to practice and enabled coach Noble to select the men who would make up the team. With the departure of Paul Curtis, the top line was in need of a new winger and Stewart Iglehart was given the first shot and filling in beside Palmer and Luce despite his prominence as a defender. The gap on defense was first filled by Hickok, who had been a reserve player the year before and that arrangement appeared to work well for the early drills. The team's second unit was initially composed of Nelson, McLennan and Bent at forward, Austen and Snead on defense and Sizer in goal.

=== Early season ===
As they had the year before, Yale's first match was against Boston University. The team was without the services of Iglehart and Bent on account of illness but the rest of the Bulldogs were more than a match for the Terriers. Palmer showed that he was back to his former self by dominating play all evening and finishing the match with a hat-trick. Nelson, Schley and Winter each netted their first of the season while Farrell and Sizer both played well in goal, allowing a single marker each. The next match was against the collegiate all-star team that included Paul Curtis and former Crimson standout John Chase. They received a tough challenge from the visitors as both sides sallied up and down the ice. The defenses, however, were the stars of the show; Hickok and Wilson checked the opposition effectively all game and gave the all-stars few scoring opportunities. Farrell made several brilliant saves but was outshone by the opposing netminder mostly due to Yale having the better chances. The only goal of the game came from Frank Nelson midway through the first period but it was enough to secure the win.

=== Christmas break ===
In the week of practice that followed, coach Noble moved Dunbar Bostwick to starting winger while Iglehart shifted a more comfortable role as reserve defenseman. The move proved auspicious as Bostwick scored twice against Dartmouth while Nelson got his second game-winner in the 3–2 victory. After the game, the team left for their holiday but reassembled at the end of the month at Lake Placid. The Elis were set to face one of the western powerhouses, Michigan, in a three-game series. The Bulldogs began with a dominant performance; Bostwick scored twice and was joined on the scoresheet by Bent, Luce, Iglehart, Palmer and Nelson. The following day the team had more of a fight than a game with nineteen penalties being called in the match. Iglehart was the only man to find the back of the net but, thanks to the efforts of the defense, the Elis were still able to come away with a victory. The third and final game saw Luce take over as the star. The speedy center potted 5 goals, which included a three-minute period where he netted three goals. Bostwick, McLennan and Schley added goals of their own to give the team a resounding 8–2 victory and end the exhibition still undefeated.

After returning home, the team prepared themselves for possibly their toughest test of the season. Toronto had already defeated Harvard twice and had dismantled Dartmouth to the tune of 11–3. The Canadians opened the scoring at Madison Square Garden but they found it difficult to penetrate the Bulldog defense thanks to the consistent checking of Iglehart. Luce netted two goals in the second to give Yale the lead but, with 29 seconds left in the period, Toronto pulled even once more. The third saw both teams battle for national supremacy with Palmer netting the winning tally in the latter half of the period. The victory was impressive in its own right and established Yale as the preeminent college team in the country.

=== January ===
Yale's prowess was on full display in the next game when they hammered Michigan Tech by one of the most lopsided scores in program history. Using eighteen players in the game, the Elis made mince meat of the Huskies and were ahead 7–0 after the first 20 minutes. The Bulldogs took it easy in the second, adding just 2 to their total before resuming their demolition with 6 more in the third. Palmer ended the match with 4 goals, McLennan with 3 goals and an assist and Bostwick had 2 goals and 2 assists. The next game was to be at Dartmouth, however, weather conditions conspired to rob the Indians of their ice and the match was cancelled. In its place, Yale invited the newly constituted 'Boston Hockey Club' to New Haven. The team, which was similar to the University Club of Boston, was composed of former college players and had already defeated Boston University by a 9–1 margin. While there was some expectation of a good match, Palmer and Luce combined to turn the game into a rout. Ding netted 5 goals on the night, equaling the Bulldogs' season high, while Frank had to settle of only scoring a hat-trick. However, Luce had the more spectacular tally on the night when he scored while two Elis were in the penalty box. Even without Wilson and Farrell in the game, the Yale defense played well with Iglehart and Muhlfeld able to keep the opposition in check. Cruikshank and Cookman were brought up from the JV squad for the match with the latter scoring in the third. McLennan and Bent had the other two tallies.

Palmer and Luce continued their torrid pace in the succeeding match with the University Club. Both forwards scored twice and were matched on the scoresheet by Nelson. With the Elis still missing Wilson and Farrell, the team got off to a slow start and were outplayed in the first, however, the deluge of goals began in the second that allowed the team to easily dispatched the all-stars 8–1. The next game saw Dartmouth arrive for their long-awaited revenge match. Despite the closeness of the initial contest between the two, the Greens were helpless before the onslaught of the Yale offense. Luce led the way with another hat-trick while Bostwick, Palmer and Nelson each added two goals of their own. The middle of the game turned physical when Dartmouth tried to assert themselves but the penalties they received only fed the Yale power play and allowed the Bulldogs to pile up 11 goals on the night.

=== February ===
The Elis didn't play another game until after the exam break. With their studies taking precedence as well as the Arena being used for an auto show, the team didn't even practice again until the beginning of February. With Wilson and Farrell both returning to the team by then, the Elis were at full-strength with they welcomed Clarkson to town. The Golden Knights were one of the best small-school teams in the country, having lost only one game to Princeton and would help the Elis gear up for their series with the Tigers. The Bulldogs got a hard fight from Clarkson, who more than lived up to their billing, but the Yale offense was far superior and led the team to a 5–1 victory. Bostwick and McLennan sandwiched goals around a Tech marker in the first. The third saw Palmer, Bent and McLennan all add to the Bulldogs lead while Wilson and Hickok endured that no goals against were scored in the final 50 minutes of the game.

On back-to-back nights, Yale played host to a pair of difficult opponents. First up was Marquette, who was proving themselves to be the best team in the mid-west. The Hilltoppers provided a challenge to the Elis near that of Toronto by playing three defensemen all night to hold back the potent Bulldog offense. Early on, however, Luce was able to get the better of the visitors with 2 goals in the first period. The two then exchanged goals in the second with Palmer scoring a pair to leave the score 4–2 entering the third. Marquette narrowed the gap to 1 goal after 5 minutes and constantly threatened the Yale cage. However, as the match progressed, Yale's superior numbers began to take over. The Hilltoppers could not contend with the depth of the Eli's roster and began to wear out in the latter stages of the game. Yale racked up 4 goals in the final four minutes of the game to put the game out of reach and capture what had been one of their toughest challenges on the season. Palmer ended the match as the leading scorer with 3 goals and an assist. The following night, the team was led by the unlikely trio of Mills, Stoddard and Todd, the rarely-used third line for the Elis. With the top two lines still recovering from the taxing match with Marquette, coach Noble gave the depth players plenty of ice time and they rewarded the crowd with two goals on the evening. The lack of fight from the St. Nicholas Hockey Club was a feature of the game that was otherwise lifeless. Even exhausted, Palmer was able to made a couple of rushes up the ice for goals but he spent most of his time cheering for his teammates.

=== Princeton ===
Undefeated to this point, Yale would finish with two best-of-three series with its traditional rivals, Princeton and Harvard. The Tigers had not had a particularly good season, at least not by their standards, and Yale entered the match a bit overconfident in their chances. The Elis still appeared to be suffering a hangover the from Marquette game and hardly looked like themselves in the first two periods. Johnny Bent, who started the game at wing, opened the scoring just 20 seconds into the match. Frank Nelson added a second about 6 minutes later, but all that did was convince the Bulldogs that they were far superior to their opponents. The team played the next 35 minutes like they had already won the match and the teamwork that so characterized their stellar play went missing. Sensing their opportunity, Princeton responded with a determined effort and broke into the Yale zone without much resistance. Two goals, approximately 18 minutes apart, brought the match back to an even score and put the Elis in jeopardy of losing their first game of the season. It wasn't until the back half of the third that the top line was finally able to shake of whatever funk they were in and led the team to victory. Palmer and Bostwick each scored to regain a 2-goal edge and escape from the Bulldogs' worst performance of the season. After a week of practice, the team travelled to New Jersey for the rematch with Princeton. In their first away game of the season, the Elis appeared to have learned their lesson and did not take the Tigers lightly. They were a far more cohesive unit in the second game and did not give any of the 2,000 attendees any hope of seeing the home team victorious. The Princeton defense played well in the match, which was the only reason that the final score was as close as it was, but at no time was their a serious threat from the Tigers.

=== Harvard ===
Entering their final series of the season, Yale was widely viewed as the best team in the country. With wins over Marquette (western champions) and Toronto (Canadian runners-up) they possessed one of the best records of any college team in history but they still had to banish their long-time rivals, Harvard. The Crimson were not having an outstanding year, entering the match with a mark of 6–3, but they still had a chance to earn an eastern collegiate championship if they were to defeat the Bulldogs. Yale could equal the program record of 18 wins if they would take two from Harvard but the team was looking for more than that and wanted to finish the season with an undefeated record. While the Elis had what was supposed to be the better team, Harvard had history on its side, winning 40 of the 56 games played between the two since the turn of the century. Unfortunately for the Bulldogs, history repeated in the first match. Coach Noble made a surprising move by starting Colman Curtiss in goal instead of the more experienced Sizer or Farrell but the neophyte held up well against the Bostonians. Curtiss repeatedly turned aside shots from the Crimson forwards and kept Yale in the game all evening. The deciding factor in the game was the Harvard defense, which was playing its typical suffocating style. McLennan and Bent scored in the first to give the Elis a lead, breaking the Harvard defense. Despite having several opportunities for the remainder of the period, Yale was unable to build on its lead. From the start of the second, the Crimson were able to refocus to stop almost every chance from the Elis before it ever reached their net. No matter how hard they tried, the top line was unable to break through and Yale had to struggle to keep the game tied when the visitors inevitably charged towards Curtiss. A goal in the latter half of the second tied the game but both sides seemed unable to get another afterwards. Overtime was needed to settle the game and Harvard was finally able to break the tie two and half minutes in. Yale desperately tried to get the match knotted in the remaining time but none of their rushes proved fruitful and the Elis saw their undefeated season go up in flames.

Even with the loss, Yale's season was not over as they then had to travel up to Boston for the rematch. After a week of hard practice, the team was ready to save their season but would have to do so without one of their regulars. Frank Nelson had been injured in the first game and he was replaced as the second center by Cookman. After spending most of the season on the JV squad, Cookman made the most of his opportunity and opened the scoring after Harvard had dominated the balance of play in the first period. The Crimson responded a few minutes later with a tying goal but Yale began to take over the game in the second period. A brilliant bit of passing between Palmer and Luce resulted in a goal from the latter. Just before the end of the period, a shot from Palmer was stopped but Bostwick followed up on the rebound and caged the Elis' third goal. The third period consisted almost entirely of the defense turning Harvard aside, much to the chagrin of the 16,000 in attendance.

With the series tied, the two sides were set for a deciding match in the middle of the week. By prior arrangement, the game would take place at the Boston Garden with a record crowd expected for a college game. When the game began, Harvard was once again the aggressor. Curtiss was bested just 5 minutes into the game but that was all he would allow for the next 45 minutes. Palmer tied the score in the middle of the period before both defenses took over. For nearly 40 minutes in the middle of the game, neither side was able to score. Most rushes to the net were broken up by the skilled defenses but the few the got through could not beat either goaltender. In the second half of the third, Harvard was finally able to get into the lead for a second time and, with under 8 minutes to play, the crowd believed they had witnessed the winning goal. Yale began to send all five of their skaters into the offensive zone and their season was saved by an unlikely hero when Hickok, who had only scored 1 goal previously, managed to find the back of the net with less than four minutes to play. For the second time in the series the two needed overtime to decide the match; this time, however, neither would yield. Three 10-minute periods were played with no further scoring. With the game still tied after 90 minutes of play, the match was called and both teams had to settle for a draw.

With the series still tied after three games, an unprecedented fourth match between the two was proposed. Yale's administration favored playing one final game and the athletic directors of both schools met to decide on a course of action. Despite the insistence from George Nettleton, Harvard's W. J. Bingham decided to end the Crimson's ice hockey season and leave the two without a clear victor. 1930 was the first time since 1900 that Harvard and Yale's ice hockey teams finished with a draw over the course of a season. The result of the series was that, despite Yale possessing a far better record, the two would share the eastern championship.

J. B. Longstreet served as team manager with J. D. Garrison as his assistant.

== Roster ==
No.	Nat.	Player	Class	Pos	Height	Weight	DoB	Hometown	Previous team
	(United States)	David E. Austen	Junior	D			1909-10-21
	(United States)	John P. Bent	Senior	RW			1908-08-05	Eagles Mere, Pennsylvania
	(United States)	Dunbar W. Bostwick	Sophomore	RW			1908-01-10	Manhattan, New York
	(United States)	John E. Cookman	Junior	F			1909-09-02	Englewood, New Jersey
	(United States)	Harold L. Cruikshank	Junior	G			1905-12-12	Boston, Massachusetts
	(United States)	Colman Curtiss Jr.	Sophomore	G			1910-01-13	Buffalo, New York
	(United States)	Franklin T. Farrell III	Junior	G			1908-03-23	New Haven, Connecticut
	(United States)	D. Hastings Hickok	Senior	D			1907-08-20	Bellefonte, Pennsylvania
	(United States)	Stewart B. Iglehart	Sophomore	D/RW			1910-02-22	Valparaíso, Chile
	(United States)	Nahum E. Jennison	Senior				1908-03-28	La Grange, Illinois
	(United States)	Frank L. Luce Jr.	Junior	C				Boston, Massachusetts
	(United States)	Donald R. McLennan Jr.	Junior	LW			1908-02-28	Chicago, Illinois
	(United States)	Edward K. Mills Jr.	Junior	F			1906-03-19	Morristown, New Jersey
	(United States)	John E. Muhlfeld	Sophomore	D			1909-06-03
	(United States)	Francis A. Nelson Jr.	Junior	C			1910-01-24	New York, New York
	(United States)	Winthrop H. Palmer	Senior	LW			1906-12-05	Warehouse Point, Connecticut
	(United States)	Reeve Schley Jr.	Junior	RW			1908-09-07	Monmouth Beach, New Jersey
	(United States)	Winston H. Sizer	Senior	G				New York, New York
	(United States)	Charles S. Snead III	Junior	D			1907-03-09	Montclair, New Jersey
	(United States)	L. Ezekiel Stoddard Jr.	Sophomore	F			1913-12-11	New Haven, Connecticut
	(United States)	Kay Todd Jr.	Sophomore	F			1910-02-10	Saint Paul, Minnesota
	(United States)	Robert F. Wilson (C)	Senior	D				Middletown, Ohio
	(United States)	John K. Winter	Sophomore	D			1910-06-24	New York, New York

== Standings ==
1929–30 Eastern Collegiate ice hockey standings
	Intercollegiate							Overall					
	GP	W	L	T	Pct.	GF	GA	GP	W	L	T	GF	GA
Amherst	9	2	7	0	.222	12	30	9	2	7	0	12	30
Army	10	6	2	2	.700	28	18	11	6	3	2	31	23
Bates	11	6	4	1	.591	28	21	11	6	4	1	28	21
Boston University	10	4	5	1	.450	34	31	13	4	8	1	40	48
Bowdoin	9	2	7	0	.222	12	29	9	2	7	0	12	29
Brown	–	–	–	–	–	–	–	12	8	3	1	–	–
Clarkson	6	4	2	0	.667	50	11	10	8	2	0	70	18
Colby	7	4	2	1	.643	19	15	7	4	2	1	19	15
Colgate	6	1	4	1	.250	9	19	6	1	4	1	9	19
Connecticut Agricultural	–	–	–	–	–	–	–	–	–	–	–	–	–
Cornell	6	4	2	0	.667	29	18	6	4	2	0	29	18
Dartmouth	–	–	–	–	–	–	–	13	5	8	0	44	54
Hamilton	–	–	–	–	–	–	–	8	4	4	0	–	–
Harvard	10	7	2	1	.750	44	14	12	7	4	1	48	23
Massachusetts Agricultural	11	7	4	0	.636	25	25	11	7	4	0	25	25
Middlebury	8	6	2	0	.750	26	13	8	6	2	0	26	13
MIT	8	4	4	0	.500	16	27	8	4	4	0	16	27
New Hampshire	11	3	6	2	.364	20	30	13	3	8	2	22	42
Northeastern	–	–	–	–	–	–	–	7	2	5	0	–	–
Norwich	–	–	–	–	–	–	–	6	0	4	2	–	–
Pennsylvania	10	4	6	0	.400	36	39	11	4	7	0	40	49
Princeton	–	–	–	–	–	–	–	18	9	8	1	–	–
Rensselaer	–	–	–	–	–	–	–	3	1	2	0	–	–
St. John's	–	–	–	–	–	–	–	–	–	–	–	–	–
St. Lawrence	–	–	–	–	–	–	–	4	0	4	0	–	–
St. Stephen's	–	–	–	–	–	–	–	–	–	–	–	–	–
Union	5	2	2	1	.500	8	18	5	2	2	1	8	18
Vermont	–	–	–	–	–	–	–	–	–	–	–	–	–
Villanova	1	0	1	0	.000	3	7	4	0	3	1	13	22
Williams	9	4	4	1	.500	28	32	9	4	4	1	28	32
Yale	14	12	1	1	.893	80	21	19	17	1	1	110	28

== Schedule and results ==
Date	Opponent	Site	Result	Record
Regular Season
December 11	Boston University*	New Haven Arena • New Haven, Connecticut	W 6–2	1–0–0
December 14	University Club of Boston*	New Haven Arena • New Haven, Connecticut	W 1–0	2–0–0
December 21	vs. Dartmouth*	Madison Square Garden • Manhattan, New York	W 3–2	3–0–0
December 30	vs. Michigan*	Lake Placid Rink • Lake Placid, New York	W 7–1	4–0–0
December 31	vs. Michigan*	Lake Placid Rink • Lake Placid, New York	W 1–0	5–0–0
January 1	vs. Michigan*	Lake Placid Rink • Lake Placid, New York	W 8–2	6–0–0
January 4	vs. Toronto*	Madison Square Garden • Manhattan, New York	W 3–2	7–0–0
January 7	Michigan Tech*	New Haven Arena • New Haven, Connecticut	W 15–0	8–0–0
January 15	Boston Hockey Club*	New Haven Arena • New Haven, Connecticut	W 11–3	9–0–0
January 18	University Club of Boston*	New Haven Arena • New Haven, Connecticut	W 8–1	10–0–0
January 22	Dartmouth*	New Haven Arena • New Haven, Connecticut	W 11–1	11–0–0
February 9	Clarkson*	New Haven Arena • New Haven, Connecticut	W 5–1	12–0–0
February 11	Marquette*	New Haven Arena • New Haven, Connecticut	W 8–3	13–0–0
February 12	St. Nicholas Hockey Club*	New Haven Arena • New Haven, Connecticut	W 7–1	14–0–0
February 15	Princeton*	New Haven Arena • New Haven, Connecticut	W 4–2	15–0–0
February 22	at Princeton*	Hobey Baker Memorial Rink • Princeton, New Jersey	W 5–1	16–0–0
March 1	Harvard*	New Haven Arena • New Haven, Connecticut (Rivalry)	L 2–3 ^{OT}	16–1–0
March 8	at Harvard*	Boston Garden • Boston, Massachusetts (Rivalry)	W 3–1	17–1–0
March 12	Harvard*	Boston Garden • Boston, Massachusetts (Rivalry)	T 2–2 ^{3OT}	17–1–1
*Non-conference game.

== Scoring statistics ==
Name	Position	Games	Goals	Assists	Points
Ding Palmer	LW	-	27	10	37
Frank Luce	C	-	22	4	26
Dunbar Bostwick	RW	-	13	8	21
Chick McLennan	LW	-	13	2	15
Frank Nelson	C	-	11	4	15
Johnny Bent	RW	-	10	3	13
Stewart Iglehart	RW	-	3	4	7
Hastings Hickok	D	-	2	1	3
Johnny Cookman	F	-	2	0	2
Reeve Schley	RW	-	2	0	2
John Muhlfeld	D/F	-	1	1	2
Bob Wilson	D	-	1	1	2
Ezekiel Stoddard	F	-	1	0	1
Kay Todd	F	-	1	0	1
Jack Winter	D	-	1	0	1
David Austen	D	-	0	0	0
Colman Curtiss	G	-	0	0	0
Frank Farrell	G	-	0	0	0
Ed Mills	F	-	0	0	0
Winston Sizer	G	-	0	0	0
Charles Snead	D	-	0	0	0
Harold Cruikshank	G	1	0	0	0
Ned Jennison		1	0	0	0
Total			110		

Note: Primary assists were recorded infrequently.
