= 1927–28 Yale Bulldogs men's ice hockey season =

College ice hockey season

- Conference: Independent
- Home ice: New Haven Arena

Record
- Overall: 14–4–0
- Home: 11–3–0
- Road: 3–1–0

Coaches and captains
- Head coach: Clarence Wanamaker
- Assistant coaches: Lawrence Noble
- Captain: Richard Vaughan

The 1927–28 Yale Bulldogs men's ice hockey season was the 33rd season of play for the program. The Bulldogs represented Yale University and were coached by Clarence Wanamaker in his 7th season.

== Season ==
With the New Haven Arena in operation from the start of the season, Yale was able to get a jump on their practice schedule and hit the ice at the beginning of December. The team brought in an enviable class of sophomores, headed by Ding Palmer to an already strong team, however, there were a few issues. Warner was dealing with a minor injury, Wilson was sidelined with a case of grippe and Ed Manville, who had been a starting defenseman last season, was academically ineligible for the first part of the season. There was hope, however, that he would be able to get into the lineup after the exams in early February. After just a week and a half of practice, the team played its first game against the University Club of Boston. The amateur team was seen as the best available outfit for the 1928 Winter Olympics but Yale still gave them a good fight. In a penalty-filled game, Palmer recorded a hat-trick and led the offense in his first game, however, the Eli defense wasn't yet up to snuff and allowed 8 goals to the prospective Olympians. The loss wasn't all bad as it didn't harm Yale's ability to compete for an intercollegiate title while showing some issues that the team still had time to address. Yale's second game wouldn't come until just before New Year's so coach Wanamaker had plenty of time to get his team into shape.

During the winter break, Yale faced its first collegiate opponent of the season and was again led by the speedy Palmer. The sophomore winger scored 4 of Yale's 5 goals, doing so before 13 minutes had elapsed. The team then cruised to victory over the Eagles, demonstrating that their defense was much improved after three weeks of training. Shortly after classes resumed, the team met a very strong contingent from Toronto and gave the Canadians all they could handle. The two teams were evenly matched throughout the game and it wasn't until the waning seconds of the waning seconds gave Toronto the victory. Yale rebounded sharply after the narrow defeat and overwhelmed MIT in the next match, trouncing the Engineers on the strength of a 5-goal game from Palmer while Vaughan and Curtis each had hat-tricks.

Yale continued to dominate in the next four games as well with the top line consistently producing. Even in what was supposed to be an even match, the efforts of Palmer and his linemates, Vaughan and Cady, enabled the Elis to skate to a relatively easy victory. After a pair of wins in the middle of the week, Yale headed into the third weekend of January staring at its biggest test of the season. Dartmouth was having another good season and was expected to give the Bulldogs another tough fight for a collegiate championship. While the Indians were led by All-American Myles Lane, it was only though his efforts that the Greens weren't swept off the ice. Yale skated rings around the Dartmouth team with, once more, Palmer leading the way. The winger netted two goals and assisted on the game-winner from Vaughan as the Elis overcame the Indians for the first time in almost 3 years.

There was no letdown for the Bulldogs afterwards as the team ran roughshod over their next three opponents, averaging 10 goals per game. Palmer 's 7-goal outburst against New Hampshire raised his season total to 31, making him one of the few college players ever to reach that mark in one season. Several alternates were used in the game but all of the scoring came from the top unit. Even the exam break didn't stop the juggernaut that was Yale hockey as the team rolled over both St. Nicholas Hockey Club and Bates before heading up to New Hampshire for the return match with Dartmouth. While the game was limited to just 15 minute periods, the two teams still gave those in attendance a tremendous game. Both clubs were fast and provided a ton of offense but the two netminders, Hurd and Bott, were both sparkling in goal. Palmer continued his torrid scoring pace by recording all 4 of Yale's tallies. Though Dartmouth fought desperately to tie the score in the third, they were unable to match the Elis and the Bulldogs swept the season series.

After a second win over St. Nick's, the Elis avenged one of their early losses by overpowering the University Club of Boston. Palmer led the way one more with a 4-goal effort and had the team in contention for the intercollegiate championship. In the following game, the rematch with Princeton, another 4 goals from Palmer made his season the stuff of legend. That outburst raised his total on the year to 52, becoming the first person in the history of American college hockey to reach the half-century mark. Not only had he score more goals than anyone else but Palmer's average of 2.88 goals per game was slightly more than Hobey Baker had managed during his best season (1912–13). As of 2023, in the entirety of college hockey, only one player (Phil Latreille) has averaged more goals per game over the course of a full season.

The win was also the 13th consecutive victory for the Elis and set them up as the favorites for the championship as they headed into the showdown with Harvard. It was an old story between the two as the Elis' high powered offense tried to break through the impenetrable Crimson defense. Morrill, possibly the best goaltender in the country, continually kept Yale from scoring in the first and allowed Giddens to open the goal in the later part of the period. Neither team managed to score in the second but Curtis was finally able to break through with the tying marker early in the third. Shortly afterwards, a scrum in front of the Yale net resulted in Hurd taking a skate to the face. The laceration was bad enough for him to miss the rest of the game and Winston Sizer was cast in the role of reluctant hero. Despite coming in cold, the understudy made several key saves to keep Harvard from scoring and sent the game into overtime. Unfortunately, Yale's luck ran out in the extra period and the go-ahead goal was jammed into the cage by Harvard captain, John Chase. Now with a lead, Harvard pulled back and played defense for the rest of the overtime and Yale was unable to skate through the 5-man front.

Yale had to travel north for the rematch a week later and were met by a hostile crowd. As they had done in the first game, Harvard made sure to keep a tight lid on Palmer and stymied the speedy winger all game long. Yale was unable to get any sort of offense going early and the lack of punch allowed Harvard to score twice in the opening frame. Hurd and the defense stiffened afterwards but the offense was unable to get anything into the Harvard cage. What few opportunities the Elis were able to generate, all were stopped by Morrill and Yale's tremendous season ended in disappointment at the hands of their hated rivals.

J. K. Curtis served as team manager with G. H. Parker as his assistant.

== Roster ==
No.	Nat.	Player	Class	Pos	Height	Weight	DoB	Hometown	Previous team
	(United States)	John P. Bent	Sophomore	RW			1908-08-05	Eagles Mere, Pennsylvania
	(United States)	James C. Brady	Junior	C				New York, New York
	(United States)	Richard G. Cady	Junior	D			1907-01-11	Hartford, Connecticut
		Paul Curtis	Junior	RW
		Harold A. Fletcher	Junior	C
	(United States)	D. Hastings Hickok	Sophomore	D			1907-08-20	Bellefonte, Pennsylvania
	(United States)	Richard M. Hurd Jr.	Senior	G				New York, New York
		Richard C. Knight	Senior	LW
	(United States)	Winthrop H. Palmer	Sophomore	LW			1906-12-05	Warehouse Point, Connecticut
		Joseph Roby Jr.	Senior	RW
		Frederick B. Ryan Jr.	Senior	D
	(United States)	Winston H. Sizer	Sophomore	G				New York, New York
		John A. Thomas	Sophomore	LW
	(United States)	Richard F. Vaughan (C)	Senior	C				Rock, Wisconsin
	(United States)	Alden Y. Warner	Junior				1906-06-24	Pine Orchard, Connecticut
	(United States)	John C. West	Sophomore	C				Clayton, Missouri
	(United States)	Robert F. Wilson	Sophomore	D				Middletown, Ohio

== Standings ==
1927–28 Eastern Collegiate ice hockey standings
	Intercollegiate							Overall					
	GP	W	L	T	Pct.	GF	GA	GP	W	L	T	GF	GA
Amherst	7	4	2	1	.643	12	7	7	4	2	1	12	7
Army	8	1	7	0	.125	6	36	9	1	8	0	9	44
Bates	10	5	5	0	.500	21	26	12	6	5	1	26	28
Boston College	6	2	3	1	.417	18	23	7	2	4	1	19	25
Boston University	9	6	2	1	.722	42	23	9	6	2	1	42	23
Bowdoin	8	3	5	0	.375	16	27	9	4	5	0	20	28
Brown	–	–	–	–	–	–	–	12	4	8	0	–	–
Clarkson	10	9	1	0	.900	59	13	11	10	1	0	61	14
Colby	5	2	3	0	.400	10	16	7	3	3	1	20	19
Colgate	4	0	4	0	.000	4	18	4	0	4	0	4	18
Cornell	5	2	3	0	.400	11	29	5	2	3	0	11	29
Dartmouth	–	–	–	–	–	–	–	10	6	4	0	64	23
Hamilton	–	–	–	–	–	–	–	8	5	2	1	–	–
Harvard	6	5	1	0	.833	28	8	9	7	2	0	45	13
Holy Cross	–	–	–	–	–	–	–	–	–	–	–	–	–
Massachusetts Agricultural	6	0	6	0	.000	5	17	6	0	6	0	5	17
Middlebury	7	6	1	0	.857	27	10	8	7	1	0	36	11
MIT	5	1	3	1	.300	7	36	5	1	3	1	7	36
New Hampshire	8	6	1	1	.813	27	25	8	6	1	1	27	25
Norwich	–	–	–	–	–	–	–	4	0	2	2	–	–
Princeton	–	–	–	–	–	–	–	12	5	7	0	–	–
Rensselaer	–	–	–	–	–	–	–	4	2	1	1	–	–
St. Lawrence	–	–	–	–	–	–	–	4	2	2	0	–	–
Syracuse	–	–	–	–	–	–	–	–	–	–	–	–	–
Union	5	0	4	1	.100	10	21	5	0	4	1	10	21
Williams	8	6	2	0	.750	27	12	8	6	2	0	27	12
Yale	13	11	2	0	.846	88	22	18	14	4	0	114	39
YMCA College	6	2	4	0	.333	10	15	6	2	4	0	10	15

== Schedule and results ==
Date	Opponent	Site	Result	Record
Regular Season
December 10	University Club of Boston*	New Haven Arena • New Haven, Connecticut	L 5–8	0–1–0
December 31	Boston College*	New Haven Arena • New Haven, Connecticut	W 5–2	1–1–0
January 3	Toronto*	New Haven Arena • New Haven, Connecticut	L 3–4	1–2–0
January 7	MIT*	New Haven Arena • New Haven, Connecticut	W 12–1	2–2–0
January 10	at Brown*	Rhode Island Auditorium • Providence, Rhode Island	W 8–1	3–2–0
January 14	Princeton*	New Haven Arena • New Haven, Connecticut	W 6–2	4–2–0
January 17	Boston University*	New Haven Arena • New Haven, Connecticut	W 9–1	5–2–0
January 18	Bowdoin*	New Haven Arena • New Haven, Connecticut	W 8–0	6–2–0
January 21	Dartmouth*	New Haven Arena • New Haven, Connecticut	W 3–1	7–2–0
January 24	New Hampshire*	New Haven Arena • New Haven, Connecticut	W 11–2	8–2–0
February 4	St. Nicholas Hockey Club*	New Haven Arena • New Haven, Connecticut	W 7–2	9–2–0
February 8	Bates*	New Haven Arena • New Haven, Connecticut	W 12–3	10–2–0
February 11	at Dartmouth*	Occom Pond • Hanover, New Hampshire	W 4–3	11–2–0
February 15	St. Nicholas Hockey Club*	New Haven Arena • New Haven, Connecticut	W 6–2	12–2–0
February 18	University Club of Boston*	New Haven Arena • New Haven, Connecticut	W 5–1	13–2–0
February 22	at Princeton*	Hobey Baker Memorial Rink • Princeton, New Jersey	W 9–2	14–2–0
February 25	Harvard*	New Haven Arena • New Haven, Connecticut (Rivalry)	L 1–2 ^{2OT}	14–3–0
March 3	at Harvard*	Boston Arena • Boston, Massachusetts (Rivalry)	L 0–2	14–4–0
*Non-conference game.

== Scoring statistics ==
Name	Position	Games	Goals
Ding Palmer	LW	-	52
Johnny Bent	RW	-	-
Jim Brady	C	-	-
Richard Cady	D	-	-
Paul Curtis	RW	-	-
Harold Fletcher	C	-	-
Hastings Hickok	D	-	-
Dick Hurd	G	-	-
Richard Knight	LW	-	-
Barry Ryan	D	-	-
Winston Sizer	G	-	-
John Thomas	LW	-	-
Richard Vaughan	C	-	-
John West	C	-	-
Bob Wilson	D	-	-
Total			114

Note: Assists were not recorded as a statistic.
