= 1928–29 Yale Bulldogs men's ice hockey season =

Eastern Collegiate, Champion
- Conference: Independent
- Home ice: New Haven Arena

Record
- Overall: 15–1–1
- Home: 11–0–0
- Road: 2–1–1
- Neutral: 2–0–0

Coaches and captains
- Head coach: Lawrence Noble
- Captain: Richard Cady

The 1928–29 Yale Bulldogs men's ice hockey season was the 34th season of play for the program. The Bulldogs represented Yale University and were coached by Lawrence Noble in his 1st season.

== Season ==
Prior to the season, Yale welcomed Lawrence Noble as the team's new head coach, but he was already well known to the program. Noble had been a 3-year starter for the Elis and served as an assistant the year before while pursuing his J. D.. The continuity meant that very little was changing for one of the nation's top programs and, after a runner-up finish in 1928, there was not much that the Bulldogs needed to change. Chief among the returning players was Ding Palmer, who had set a new intercollegiate record with 52 goals the year before. However, the Elis would need to find a new starting goaltender as last year's #1 had graduated. As the team was gearing up for their opening match, they had good news for the future of the program as 70 men had shown up for freshman tryouts, the largest batch of recruits to date.

=== Early season ===
Yale's season began at home against Boston University. With just a few weeks of practice under their belt, the teamwork was lacking. The defense, led by team captain Richard Cady was impenetrable and helped Farrell earn his first career shutout. The reserve players had more to do with the scoring for Yale as both McLennan and Snead earned their first goals of the campaign, but Palmer was still omnipresent on the Eli attack. A few days later, the team welcomed a collection of former collegiate all-stars called the 'University Club of Boston'. Though the visitors were missing their captain, George Owen, they were still a formidable group that had defeated Yale several times over the past few years. Farrell was kept on his toes the entire game and responded with a brilliant performance. McLennan's tally at the end of the second was the only score for Yale and the defense ensured that it stood as the winner.

The Elis had a full week of practice before the next meeting when they took on McGill at Madison Square Garden. The Bulldogs started off slow but showed their teeth with a pair of goals in the second. The audience witnessed a tremendous level of teamwork in the final period that saw Curtis and Palmer whipping the puck around the rink to each tab their second goals of the game. Farrell's shutout streak was ended with 9 minutes to play but Luce tallied two goals to finish off the scoring and wrap up a stunning win for the American side. The Elis began their winter break immediately after the match and did not reconvene until the end of the month. They had a few hard practices to shake off the rust before meeting Dartmouth for a tune-up game that would not be counted towards the intercollegiate championship. That was fortunate for the greens as the Eli offense pummeled the opposing cage with a barrage of shots from the drop of the puck. Luce had two goals and an assist to his credit by the end of the first and that was more than enough for the Bulldogs as their defense remained as stout as ever. The Indians' lone tally came at the beginning of the second out of a net-front scrimmage but any chance they had was ended with Luce finished off his hat-trick at the end of the period. The team wrapped up their vacation with a second trip to MSG, this time facing down possibly the best college team in Canada. Toronto did not take the Elis lightly and played them hard from the start, opening the scoring just 3 minutes into the match. The defense tightened afterwards, holding the Varsity Blues scoreless for the remainder of the period. Luce tied the match at the beginning of the second but Toronto pull ahead in the middle of the second and looked to be the better of the two at the time. The Elis picked up the pace in the third and Curtis proved to be the hero of the match. After knotting the score at the 5-minute mark, Luce found him with a perfect pass in the middle of the frame for Yale's first lead of the match. Toronto ratcheted up the pressure and did everything they could to get their third goal but Farrell was unbeatable and kept his team in the lead until the final buzzer.

The team had a week of practice before their next game, a rematch with the University Club of Boston. This time, however, Owen would be on the ice for the visitors while Palmer was one of several players suffering from the flu and would miss the match. McLennan starred as Palmer's understudy and scored just 50 seconds into the game. Cady and Wilson had their hands full, holding off the potent offense of the all-stars but they were up to the task. Farrell turned aside the few chanced that slipped through the defense and shut down the visitors for the second time that season. Coach Noble cycled through his lines often, including swapping Farrell out for Sizer, to make sure none of his players got too tired. By the end of the night, the score was 4–0 for the Elis. Yale got a bit of a breather with their next game when Brown arrived. Even without Palmer, the Elis overwhelmed the Bears; Luce opened the scoring less than a minute into the game and the goals kept coming regardless of who was on the ice. Cruikshank was able to get a turn in goal since Sizer was out due to illness, playing the final two periods in relief. Jennison and McLennan both recorded a hat-tricks while Cady netted a pair for himself. With game essentially over by the start of the third, several reserves were able to get their first (and only) taste of game action for the year: Rudd, Thomas, Ellsworth, Fletcher and Clark.

=== January ===
The end of the week saw Dartmouth arrive in town, now at full strength and ready to avenge their earlier loss. Before a crowd of 1,800, Palmer returned just in time for defensive battle that saw scoring chances limited on both sides. Yale was the more aggressive of the two but they were facing perhaps the best goaltender in the nation and the Elis had great difficulty in getting the puck into the Indians' cage. Even when Lice was able to get a clean shot at a vacated net, he sent the puck wide and the two teams seemed destined for a scoreless game. The Bulldogs were having to contend with a 3-man defense from the greens which held off the starters on offense. Fortunately, the reserves were up to the task. Late in the third, Nelson picked up a loose puck and fired a hard shot on goal. He followed up by collecting the rebound and slapped the rubber into the top corner of the net for the first goal of the match. Dartmouth demanded that the referee wave off the goal for offsides but it was allowed to stand. The Greens relentlessly attacked Farrell's cage for the remainder of the game, desperately searching for the tying goal but the Eli defense held. Curtis scored what he thought was an insurance marker in the waning moments of the game but the referee had already blown the whistle and the score remained 1–0 until the final buzzer. Three days later, the team headed to Philadelphia for their first road game of the year and were easily able to dispatch the Penn Quakers. Penn was playing it first season since 1922 and the team as hardly a match for the Bulldogs. Johnny Bent was the game's high scorer, recording 6 goals for the Elis while Frank Nelson netted a trio of goals. With the team off until after the exams, coach Noble cancelled the remaining practices so his players would have extra time for study.

After the break, the players were put through their paces in preparation for the final game with Dartmouth. With snow falling throughout the game, the Elis were beset by an angry bunch on Indians on their home ice. Dartmouth got an early lead thanks to star center Eddie Jeremiah but Farrell refused to allow a second goal for the remainder of the match. Palmer had several chances to tie the game but was stymied by the green goalie time and again. With the clock winding down in the third, Bob Wilson netted his first goal of the season and forced the match into extra time. After the first period, the two sides agreed to stop every 10 minutes so that the snow could be cleaned off of the ice. Despite the stoppages, snow accumulated quickly and limited both offenses. Players on both sides continued to race up and down the ice but passing was at a premium. The overtime period was divided into the two 5-minute ends but neither side could find the goal and the two had to accept a draw. Yale returned home for a match with the St. Nicholas Hockey Club that saw Palmer look like himself for the first time since early January. With the defense stopping everything that could be summoned by the visitors, three goals from the top line was more than enough to earn the 10th victory of the year for the Elis.

=== Princeton ===
As the season was winding down, Yale still had to get through two of the best teams in college hockey. Princeton was having a renaissance and entered the first game with an undefeated record. Before a capacity crowd of 3,000 at the Hobey Baker Memorial Rink, the Tigers threw everything they had at the Elis. Farrell had another stellar game, holding Princeton scoreless through two periods but the Elis were also blanked for the first 40 minutes. Palmer finally broke the tie at the beginning of the third when he fired a long shot from center ice that surprised the Tiger netminder and bounced into the goal. Five minutes later, Princeton solved Farrell for the tying goal, much to the delight of the crowd. Undaunted, Luce weaved his way through the opposition defense and fired a hard shot into the goal. Princeton continued to attack the Eli net for the final 10 minutes but to no avail. Yale returned home with another win to its credit and were a step closer to a championship. Before the rematch, Yale met Boston College but it was clear from the start that the Bulldogs were the better of the two. The game was mostly played by Yale's reserves and the second team ended up netting four of the five goals in the game. The rematch with Princeton saw 3,600 in attendance and saw the best out of both teams. The top line of Luce, Palmer and Curtis were on display all evening but it was backup winger Don McLennan who opened the scoring at the end of the first after a brilliant bit of stickhandling. Early in the second, Palmer found Curtis alone in front of the cage with a pass from the corner for the second Eli goal. Less than a minute later, Curtis tallied again after a weak shot from the point trickled through the goaltenders pads. With a sizable lead, Yale cycled through its three forward lines as a matter of course and used their live legs to hold off the Tigers. In the third, with the withering attack beginning to wear Farrell down, Sizer was sent in as a replacement in goal but it nearly proved disastrous. Princeton finally got onto the board and shifted to total offense for the remainder of the match. Despite using four forwards, Princeton was unable to get a second goal and any chance they had at a title was ended by the Bulldogs.

=== Championship series ===
With the team still undefeated after fourteen games, the only team that stood in Yale's path was their old nemesis, Harvard. The Elis had over a week to prepare themselves for the trip north to Boston but even they had yet to see a defensive juggernaut like the vaunted Crimson. The first match between the two sides was played at the Boston Garden before 12,000 mostly hostile fans. The two teams attempted to batter one another into submission, with penalties aplenty being handed out to both sides, providing numerous power plays in the game. Harvard got the first lead of the game early in the second but Luce was eventually able to tie the match at the start of the third. Just 18 second elapsed before Harvard was in the lead once more. Yale was unable to penetrate the Crimson defense for the remainder of the game. Virtually every rush up the ice was stopped by the home team and they sent the Elis home, smarting over their first loss of the season. Going into the rematch, Yale had no margin for error but they were spurred on by a crowd 4,500, the largest ever assembled for a home game. Both defenses were nigh unbeatable in the game and neither side received many scoring chances. It was not until the middle of the third that the tie was finally broken when Luce was able to wrap the puck around from behind the goal. The end of the game saw an uptick in ferocity with several players being whistled for infractions. Farrell was called upon to save the day and he replied but stopping every single shot from the visitors. The win evened the season series and made a third game necessary to decide the championship.

By prior agreement, the rubber match would be played in New Haven and save the Elis from returning to the side of the only loss on the year. With around 4,000 in attendance, Yale and Harvard lived up to their billing as the two best college teams in the country. Even with Harvard having to turn to a third-string netminder, the visitors did not surrender an inch to the Bulldogs and got the game's first lead. Luce was quick to tie the score and Palmer gave the Elis their first lead just 10 seconds later. Harvard evened the score six minutes into the second and both defenses stiffened afterwards. Neither team could make much headway against the other, even when on one of the numerous power play opportunities that were handed out throughout the second half of the game. Even when Harvard had been whittled down to just two skaters, they still had enough aplomb to hold off the Bulldogs and force the game into overtime. Two 10-minute sessions went by to no avail while both teams used every player at their disposal. At the 7:05 mark of the third overtime, Frank Nelson took a pass from Johnny Bent off of a faceoff and fired the puck into the center of the Harvard net. The building exploded with cheers from the partisan crowd but the game was not yet over. Yale still had to defend against Harvard for the final three minutes or risk losing their shot at the title. Farrell remained a rock in goal and, despite having six attackers arrayed against him, kept the score static until end of the game. Yale claimed its first intercollegiate title since 1925 in one of the most dramatic finishes in program history.

T. C. Farnsworth served as team manager with J. B. Longstreet as his assistant.

== Roster ==
No.	Nat.	Player	Class	Pos	Height	Weight	DoB	Hometown	Previous team
	(United States)	David E. Austen	Sophomore				1909-10-21
	(United States)	John P. Bent	Junior	RW			1908-08-05	Eagles Mere, Pennsylvania
	(United States)	James Breckenridge	Sophomore	C			1909-02-08	New York, New York
	(United States)	Richard G. Cady (C)	Senior	D			1907-01-11	Hartford, Connecticut
		Clark
	(United States)	John E. Cookman	Sophomore	C			1909-09-02	Englewood, New Jersey
	(United States)	Harold L. Cruikshank	Sophomore	G			1905-12-12	Boston, Massachusetts
		Paul Curtis	Senior	RW
		Ellsworth
	(United States)	Franklin T. Farrell III	Sophomore	G			1908-03-23	New Haven, Connecticut
		Harold A. Fletcher	Senior
	(United States)	D. Hastings Hickok	Junior	D			1907-08-20	Bellefonte, Pennsylvania
	(United States)	Nahum E. Jennison	Junior	LW			1908-03-28	La Grange, Illinois
	(United States)	Frank L. Luce Jr.	Sophomore	C				Boston, Massachusetts
	(United States)	Donald R. McLennan Jr.	Sophomore	LW			1908-02-28	Chicago, Illinois
	(United States)	Francis A. Nelson Jr.	Sophomore	F			1910-01-24	New York, New York
	(United States)	Winthrop H. Palmer	Junior	LW			1906-12-05	Warehouse Point, Connecticut
		Rudd	Sophomore
	(United States)	Reeve Schley Jr.	Sophomore	RW			1908-09-07	Monmouth Beach, New Jersey
	(United States)	Winston H. Sizer	Junior	G				New York, New York
	(United States)	Charles S. Snead III	Sophomore	D			1907-03-09	Montclair, New Jersey
		John A. Thomas	Junior
	(United States)	John C. West	Junior					Clayton, Missouri
	(United States)	Robert F. Wilson	Junior	D				Middletown, Ohio

== Standings ==
1928–29 Eastern Collegiate ice hockey standings
	Intercollegiate							Overall					
	GP	W	L	T	Pct.	GF	GA	GP	W	L	T	GF	GA
Amherst	8	3	4	1	.438	13	18	9	3	5	1	14	20
Army	9	2	7	0	.222	11	50	12	3	9	0	23	61
Bates	11	4	6	1	.409	26	20	12	5	6	1	28	21
Boston College	10	4	6	0	.400	29	27	14	5	9	0	36	42
Boston University	10	9	1	0	.900	36	9	12	9	2	1	39	14
Bowdoin	9	5	4	0	.556	11	14	9	5	4	0	11	14
Brown	–	–	–	–	–	–	–	13	8	5	0	–	–
Clarkson	7	6	1	0	.857	43	11	10	9	1	0	60	19
Colby	5	0	4	1	.100	4	11	5	0	4	1	4	11
Colgate	7	4	3	0	.571	16	18	7	4	3	0	16	18
Connecticut Agricultural	–	–	–	–	–	–	–	–	–	–	–	–	–
Cornell	5	2	3	0	.400	7	9	5	2	3	0	7	9
Dartmouth	–	–	–	–	–	–	–	17	9	5	3	58	28
Hamilton	–	–	–	–	–	–	–	10	4	6	0	–	–
Harvard	7	4	3	0	.571	26	10	10	5	4	1	31	15
Massachusetts Agricultural	11	6	5	0	.545	30	20	12	7	5	0	33	21
Middlebury	10	7	3	0	.700	27	29	10	7	3	0	27	29
MIT	11	5	6	0	.455	26	32	11	5	6	0	26	32
New Hampshire	11	6	4	1	.591	23	20	11	6	4	1	23	20
Norwich	–	–	–	–	–	–	–	8	2	6	0	–	–
Pennsylvania	11	2	9	0	.182	12	82	13	2	10	1	–	–
Princeton	–	–	–	–	–	–	–	19	15	3	1	–	–
Rensselaer	–	–	–	–	–	–	–	4	1	3	0	–	–
St. John's	–	–	–	–	–	–	–	7	3	3	1	–	–
St. Lawrence	–	–	–	–	–	–	–	8	3	4	1	–	–
St. Stephen's	–	–	–	–	–	–	–	–	–	–	–	–	–
Syracuse	–	–	–	–	–	–	–	–	–	–	–	–	–
Union	5	2	2	1	.500	17	14	5	2	2	1	17	14
Vermont	–	–	–	–	–	–	–	–	–	–	–	–	–
Williams	10	6	4	0	.600	33	16	10	6	4	0	33	16
Yale	12	10	1	1	.875	47	9	17	15	1	1	64	12

== Schedule and results ==
Date	Opponent	Site	Result	Record
Regular Season
December 12	Boston University*	New Haven Arena • New Haven, Connecticut	W 3–0	1–0–0
December 15	University Club of Boston*	New Haven Arena • New Haven, Connecticut	W 1–0	2–0–0
December 22	vs. McGill*	Madison Square Garden • Manhattan, New York	W 6–1	3–0–0
January 2	Dartmouth*	New Haven Arena • New Haven, Connecticut	W 5–1	4–0–0
January 5	vs. Toronto*	Madison Square Garden • Manhattan, New York	W 3–2	5–0–0
January 12	University Club of Boston*	New Haven Arena • New Haven, Connecticut	W 4–0	6–0–0
January 16	Brown*	New Haven Arena • New Haven, Connecticut	W 10–1	7–0–0
January 19	Dartmouth*	New Haven Arena • New Haven, Connecticut	W 1–0	8–0–0
January 22	at Pennsylvania*	Philadelphia Ice Palace • Philadelphia, Pennsylvania	W 12–0	9–0–0
February 9	at Dartmouth*	Occom Pond • Hanover, New Hampshire	T 1–1 ^{2OT}	9–0–1
February 13	St. Nicholas Hockey Club*	New Haven Arena • New Haven, Connecticut	W 3–0	10–0–1
February 16	at Princeton*	Hobey Baker Memorial Rink • Princeton, New Jersey	W 2–1	11–0–1
February 19	Boston College*	New Haven Arena • New Haven, Connecticut	W 5–0	12–0–1
February 22	Princeton*	New Haven Arena • New Haven, Connecticut	W 3–1	13–0–1
March 2	at Harvard*	Boston Garden • Boston, Massachusetts (Rivalry)	L 1–2	13–1–1
March 9	Harvard*	New Haven Arena • New Haven, Connecticut (Rivalry)	W 1–0	14–1–1
March 13	Harvard*	New Haven Arena • New Haven, Connecticut (Rivalry)	W 3–2 ^{3OT}	15–1–1
*Non-conference game.

== Scoring statistics ==
Name	Position	Games	Goals	Assists	Points
Frank Luce	C	-	11	6	17
Paul Curtis	RW	-	9	4	13
Frank Nelson	F	-	7	5	12
Ding Palmer	LW	-	8	2	10
Don McLennan	LW	-	7	0	7
Johnny Bent	RW	-	6	0	6
Ned Jennison	LW	-	4	0	4
Johnny Cookman	C	-	2	2	4
Richard Cady	D	-	3	0	3
Charles Snead	D	-	3	0	3
John West		-	2	0	2
Reeve Schley	RW	-	1	0	1
Jim Breckenridge	C	-	0	1	1
Hastings Hickok	D	-	1	0	1
Bob Wilson	D	-	1	0	1
David Austen		-	0	0	0
Frank Farrell	G	-	0	0	0
Winston Sizer	G	-	0	0	0
Harold Cruikshank	G	-	0	0	0
Clark		1	0	0	0
Ellsworth		1	0	0	0
Harold Fletcher		1	0	0	0
Rudd		1	0	0	0
John Thomas		1	0	0	0
Total			64		

Note: Primary assists were recorded infrequently.
