= 1926–27 Yale Bulldogs men's ice hockey season =

College ice hockey season

- Conference: Independent
- Home ice: New Haven Arena

Record
- Overall: 8–7–1
- Home: 4–4–1
- Road: 2–2–0
- Neutral: 2–1–0

Coaches and captains
- Head coach: Clarence Wanamaker
- Captain: Lawrence Noble

The 1926–27 Yale Bulldogs men's ice hockey season was the 32nd season of play for the program. The Bulldogs represented Yale University and were coached by Clarence Wanamaker in his 6th season.

== Season ==
Before the team collected for its first meeting in early December, the program had already received news of two very positive developments. First, thanks to the efforts of Abraham Podoloff, the rebuild of the New Haven Arena was set to be finished in January and the school reached an agreement to rent the facility for four months out of the year for a 16-year period. Secondly, and perhaps more surprisingly, Yale University had decided to finally promote the men's ice hockey program to 'major' status in the athletic department. Aside from the prestige that this carried, the school was not fully committed to supporting the team which included a sizable increase in its operating budget. Before those changes took effect, however, the team had to shake off the rust and used both the Eastern States Coliseum and Hobey Baker Memorial Rink as practice venues in December. Because the team was hampered by a lack of practice time last season, the Elis decided against a heavy schedule over the winter break and would instead devote more time to training. This meant that the team would remain in the area over the holidays and played just 3 games during the vacation.

The Bulldogs needed the extra practice time as most of the team's started had graduated. John Frey and team captain Lawrence Noble were the only returning starters, though several had seen extra playing time due to injuries last year. Even with a new lineup, Yale was still able to get off to a good start in the season opener against McGill as Frey recorded the first goal of the season. Unfortunately, the Elis were unable to get another goal past the Red goalie. The Canadians picked up the pace in the second and started firing at the Yale cage. One of those pucks caught Richard Hurd in a vulnerable spot and injured the netminder. McGill ended up with 4 goals in the second half while Yale couldn't add to its total and dropped the match. A few days later, the Elis headed up to Springfield and got a tough test from MIT. With Wheelock now in goal, the Elis were able to rely on the more experienced goaltender to turn away several shots from the Engineers. He kept MIT off the scoresheet long enough for Frey's goal in the second period to give the team a lead. After their opponents rallied to tie the game in the third, the two agreed to play a 10-minute overtime period and gave Noble the time needed to score twice and give the Elis a lead they would not relinquish. MIT scored just as the extra time was coming to a close but that didn't stop Yale from posting its first win of the season. A week later, the team met Notre Dame for the first time on the ice and welcomed the visitors with a 5–0 victory. Noble was the star of the game and the score would have been even more lopsided if it weren't for the stellar play of the Irish netminder.

After that solid start, Yale was able to practice at the New Haven Arena after it finally reopened. They were able to use the extra ice time to great advantage over Brown, who were playing their first game in over 20 years. Expectedly, the Elis dominated the match and kept their winning streak alive with a 8–1 win. While the match was played with 15-minute periods, it was also notable for coach Wanamaker swapping Frey and Vaughan, with the former moving to center, and starting Robinson at left wing, who went on to record a hat-trick. The next game saw the team post an even more impressive victory when they took down Princeton 9–1. Noble and Vaughan were key in staking the team to a 3–0 lead just 6 minutes into the game while both were able to complete hat-tricks before the end of the second. The win not only put Yale into contention for a collegiate title but it avenged the season sweep at the hands of the Tigers the year before.

Yale was finally able to play a true home game when they met the St. Nicholas Hockey Club in mid January. They faced off against one of the best amateur teams in the country who were led by former star Bulldog, Alston Jenkins, in goal. In front of 2,500 fans, the Elis' former captain held the Bulldogs back and stopped them from completing a dramatic comeback, handing Yale a 2–3 defeat. Undaunted, the team rebounded with a strong performance against Boston University the following night. Led by a hat-trick from Vaughan, the Elis kept their record against collegiate opponents spotless and move them closer to a title. For their third game in 5 days, the team got a tough fight from Dartmouth. With a crowd of 3,500 supporters to cheer them on, the Elis and Indians battled through stingy defenses and were each only able to score a single goal. Outstanding goaltending was the rule for the day while goals from Vaughan and Noble were called on due to offsides. Hurd was the surprising starter in goal but only surrendered one marker to Dartmouth star, Myles Lane. Both teams appeared tired in the first two 10-minute overtime sessions but rallied for a furious 3rd extra period. However, after neither was able to score, the game was called a draw and both teamed looked forward to the rematch to settle things.

The team had some time off before their next match due to the exam break and didn't play again until February. They returned against the University Club of Boston, an aggregation of 13 amateur players who were vying to represent the United States at the next Winter Olympics. The team showed just how good it was by throttling Yale 1–7 with a collection of former college all-stars. Luckily, the Elis lost no standing by responding with a 7–2 win over Williams in a fairly slow match. Noble led the way with his second hat-trick of the season. A few days later the team headed up to Hanover for the return match with the Greens and, once again, Yale and Dartmouth were the equal of each other. With Ryan replacing Manville on the blueline, the game was close throughout. Yale got into the lead in the third period and held it until the final minute when Lane broke through the Bulldog defense to tie the score. Another long overtime was required, however, this time Dartmouth was able to get the game-winner near the end of the second extra session and take the season series.

With their championship aspirations suffering a mortal blow, the Elis responded with an overpowering performance against Syracuse, routing the Orangemen 18–1. Even with Noble out of the lineup, Vaughan led the way with 7 goals while Ryan added 4 as the Elis seemingly kept the puck in the Syracuse end for the entire game. Noble was back when the team met St. Nicholas for a rematch but, again, former captain Jenkins was the star of the show. The Elis used the unusual tactic of three defensemen and two forwards to break up the attack from the amateurs but were still able to get 4 goals of their own. Unfortunately, their ploy wasn't as effective as they would have liked and Yale came up short by a goal for the second time that season.

Yale didn't have any time to mull over its missed opportunities as the very next game was against arch-rival Harvard. Even though the Bulldogs wouldn't be able to win an intercollegiate title due to the loss to Dartmouth, the team could still play spoiler and stop the Crimson from winning the championship. Unfortunately, the huge crowd at the Boston Arena were rewarded with a dominant performance by the home town team. Harvard scored 4 goals in the first and then put the game on cruise control. Yale slowly clawed back with a pair of goals by the beginning of the third, however, as soon as there was any danger, the Crimson netted another pair of markers to take the game comfortably. The rematch with Princeton came just a few days later and the Elis found themselves in a tough battle. Despite losing their star player, Davis, early in the match, the Tigers kept close to the Bulldogs for the first two periods. The game was broken open in the third when Yale scored 5 times and ran away with the game. While Vaughan and Frey were the stars of the night, the game also saw Alden Warner play his first full game in goal. With Yale down to its final game of the season, they welcomed Harvard to New Haven and were hoping for a much better outcome against the Crimson. In front of a full arena, Yale attacked the Harvard cage time and time again, only to see Joe Morrill turn everything aside. Noble and Frey were in top form throughout the game as both were playing in their final match for the Bulldogs but the Crimson defense was just too strong. Harvard opened the scoring in the second half with a long shot from center ice that slipped through Warner and dribbled into the cage. Four minutes later, a strong shot from Tudor raised Harvard's lead to two. Noble was able to cut the lead in half with about 4 minutes left in the third but the Elis were unable to get the tying marker and could only watch as Harvard completed an undefeated season to capture another intercollegiate championship.

G. H. Walker Jr. served as team manager with J. Curtis as his assistant.

== Roster ==
No.	Nat.	Player	Class	Pos	Height	Weight	DoB	Hometown	Previous team
	(United States)	James C. Brady Jr.	Sophomore	D			1907-07-28	New York, New York
	(United States)	Richard G. Cady	Sophomore	LW/D			1907-01-11	Hartford, Connecticut
		Paul Curtis	Sophomore	LW
2	(United States)	John T. M. Frey	Senior	C/RW			1904-10-12	Brooklyn, New York
		John A. Herrman	Junior	C
15	(United States)	Richard M. Hurd Jr.	Junior	G				New York, New York
		Richard C. Knight	Junior	LW
	(United States)	Raymond W. Lapham	Junior	D			1903-12-14	Boston, Massachusetts
5	(United States)	Edward H. Manville Jr.	Sophomore	D				New York, New York
1	(United States)	Lawrence M. Noble (C)	Senior	D			1903-12-11	Monroe, Michigan
		D. L. Norris	Senior	D
16	(United States)	Frederick F. Robinson	Senior	LW				Watertown, New York
		Joseph Roby Jr.	Junior	RW
		Frederick B. Ryan Jr.	Junior	LW/D
3	(United States)	Richard F. Vaughan	Junior	C/RW				Rock, Wisconsin
	(United States)	Alden Y. Warner	Sophomore	G			1906-06-24	Pine Orchard, Connecticut
6		Joseph A. Wheelock	Senior	G

== Standings ==
1926–27 Eastern Collegiate ice hockey standings
	Intercollegiate							Overall					
	GP	W	L	T	Pct.	GF	GA	GP	W	L	T	GF	GA
Amherst	8	3	2	3	.563	9	9	8	3	2	3	9	9
Army	3	0	2	1	.167	5	13	4	0	3	1	7	20
Bates	8	4	3	1	.563	17	18	10	6	3	1	22	19
Boston College	2	1	1	0	.500	2	3	6	3	3	0	15	18
Boston University	7	2	4	1	.357	25	18	8	2	5	1	25	23
Bowdoin	8	3	5	0	.375	17	23	9	4	5	0	26	24
Brown	8	4	4	0	.500	16	26	8	4	4	0	16	26
Clarkson	9	8	1	0	.889	42	11	9	8	1	0	42	11
Colby	7	3	4	0	.429	16	12	7	3	4	0	16	12
Cornell	7	1	6	0	.143	10	23	7	1	6	0	10	23
Dartmouth	–	–	–	–	–	–	–	15	11	2	2	68	20
Hamilton	–	–	–	–	–	–	–	10	6	4	0	–	–
Harvard	8	7	0	1	.938	32	9	12	9	1	2	44	18
Massachusetts Agricultural	7	2	4	1	.357	5	10	7	2	4	1	5	10
Middlebury	6	6	0	0	1.000	25	7	6	6	0	0	25	7
MIT	8	3	4	1	.438	19	21	8	3	4	1	19	21
New Hampshire	6	6	0	0	1.000	22	7	6	6	0	0	22	7
Norwich	–	–	–	–	–	–	–	–	–	–	–	–	–
NYU	–	–	–	–	–	–	–	–	–	–	–	–	–
Princeton	6	2	4	0	.333	24	32	13	5	7	1	55	64
Providence	–	–	–	–	–	–	–	8	1	7	0	13	39
Rensselaer	–	–	–	–	–	–	–	3	0	2	1	–	–
St. Lawrence	–	–	–	–	–	–	–	7	3	4	0	–	–
Syracuse	–	–	–	–	–	–	–	–	–	–	–	–	–
Union	5	3	2	0	.600	18	14	5	3	2	0	18	14
Vermont	–	–	–	–	–	–	–	–	–	–	–	–	–
Williams	12	6	6	0	.500	38	40	12	6	6	0	38	40
Yale	12	8	3	1	.708	72	26	16	8	7	1	80	45
YMCA College	7	3	4	0	.429	16	19	7	3	4	0	16	19

== Schedule and results ==
Date	Opponent	Site	Result	Record
Regular Season
December 30	vs. McGill*	Madison Square Garden • Manhattan, New York	L 1–4	0–1–0
January 3	vs. MIT*	Eastern States Coliseum • Springfield, Massachusetts	W 3–2 ^{OT}	1–1–0
January 8	vs. Notre Dame*	Madison Square Garden • Manhattan, New York	W 5–0	2–1–0
January 12	at Brown*	Rhode Island Auditorium • Providence, Rhode Island	W 8–1 ^{†}	3–1–0
January 15	at Princeton*	Hobey Baker Memorial Rink • Princeton, New Jersey	W 9–1	4–1–0
January 18	St. Nicholas Hockey Club*	New Haven Arena • New Haven, Connecticut	L 2–3	4–2–0
January 19	Boston University*	New Haven Arena • New Haven, Connecticut	W 7–3	5–2–0
January 22	Dartmouth*	New Haven Arena • New Haven, Connecticut	T 1–1 ^{3OT}	5–2–1
February 5	University Club of Boston*	New Haven Arena • New Haven, Connecticut	L 1–7	5–3–1
February 9	Williams*	New Haven Arena • New Haven, Connecticut	W 7–2	6–3–1
February 12	at Dartmouth*	Occom Pond • Hanover, New Hampshire	L 3–4 ^{2OT}	6–4–1
February 14	Syracuse*	New Haven Arena • New Haven, Connecticut	W 18–1	7–4–1
February 16	St. Nicholas Hockey Club*	New Haven Arena • New Haven, Connecticut	L 4–5	7–5–1
February 19	at Harvard*	Boston Arena • Boston, Massachusetts (Rivalry)	L 2–6	7–6–1
February 22	Princeton*	New Haven Arena • New Haven, Connecticut	W 8–3	8–6–1
February 27	Harvard*	New Haven Arena • New Haven, Connecticut (Rivalry)	L 1–2	8–7–1
*Non-conference game.

† Yale's records have the score as 9–1.
Note: Yale's contemporary classification of their games as 'practice' or 'exhibition is misleading. The program referred to any contest before or during the winter break as such despite being official matches.

== Scoring statistics ==
Name	Position	Games	Goals
Richard Vaughan	C	-	24
Jack Frey	RW	-	15
Lawrence Noble	D	-	14
Paul Curtis	LW/RW	-	7
Barry Ryan	LW/D	-	6
Richard Knight	LW	-	5
Frederick Robinson	LW	-	4
John Herrman	C	-	2
Richard Cady	LW/D	-	1
Ed Manville	D	-	1
Jim Brady	D	-	0
Dick Hurd	G	-	0
Ray Lapham	D	-	0
D. Norris	D	-	0
Joseph Roby	RW	-	0
Alden Warner	G	-	0
Joe Wheelock	G	-	0
Total			79

Note: The statistics from the game against the University Club of Boston were not reported.
Note: Assists were not recorded as a statistic.
