= List of Boston University Terriers men's ice hockey seasons =

This is a season-by-season list of records compiled by Boston University in men's ice hockey.

Boston University has won five NCAA Men's Division I Ice Hockey Championships in its history, the most recent of which came in 2009. After two early attempts there has been an official ice hockey team at BU since 1922 with a short hiatus caused by World War II. After the war the program played as a club team for four years before returning to varsity status and promptly making the championship game in 1950. Despite good performances most years the Terriers didn't win their first title until 1971. Boston University's most productive period was the 1970s and saw them win 4 conference titles, 5 conference tournament titles and 3 national championships. The same decade also brought about the beginning of the longest tenure for one coach at any division I school when Jack Parker started a 40-year stint in 1973–74. After a mostly down period in the 1980s BU had a resurgence in the '90's, winning five consecutive Hockey East titles and appearing in four national championship games (though they could only win one of them).

== Season-by-season results ==
Note: GP = Games played, W = Wins, L = Losses, T = Ties

NCAA D-I Champions	NCAA Frozen Four	Conference regular season champions	Conference Playoff Champions

Season	Conference	Regular Season (Note: Code explanation; GP—Games Played, W—Wins, L—Losses, T—Tied games, OTW—Overtime Wins, OTL—Overtime Loses, 3/SW—Win in 3 on 3 overtime or shootout, Pts—Points*)														Conference Tournament Results	National Tournament Results
Season	Conference	Conference									Overall					Conference Tournament Results	National Tournament Results
Season	Conference	GP	W	L	T	OTW	OTL	3/SW	Pts*	Finish	GP	W	L	T	%	Conference Tournament Results	National Tournament Results
Edgar Burkhardt (1917 — 1918)
1917–18	Independent	–	–	–	–	–	–	–	–	–	1	0	1	0	.000		
Program Suspended Due to World War I
Harold Stuart (1919 — 1920)
1919–20	Independent	–	–	–	–	–	–	–	–	–	2	0	2	0	.000		
Program Suspended
John O'Hare (1922 — 1924)
1922–23	Independent	–	–	–	–	–	–	–	–	–	8	2	6	0	.250		
1923–24	Independent	–	–	–	–	–	–	–	–	–	9	1	8	0	.111		
Chippy Gaw (1924 — 1928)
1924–25	Independent	–	–	–	–	–	–	–	–	–	12	7	4	1	.625		
1925–26	Independent	–	–	–	–	–	–	–	–	–	15	7	8	0	.467		
1926–27	Independent	–	–	–	–	–	–	–	–	–	8	2	5	1	.313		
1927–28	Independent	–	–	–	–	–	–	–	–	–	9	6	2	1	.722		
Wayland Vaughan (1928 — 1940)
1928–29	Independent	–	–	–	–	–	–	–	–	–	12	9	2	1	.792		
1929–30	Independent	–	–	–	–	–	–	–	–	–	13	4	8	1	.346		
1930–31	Independent	–	–	–	–	–	–	–	–	–	12	6	6	0	.500		
1931–32	Independent	–	–	–	–	–	–	–	–	–	10	6	4	0	.600		
1932–33	Independent	–	–	–	–	–	–	–	–	–	10	7	3	0	.700		
1933–34	Independent	–	–	–	–	–	–	–	–	–	13	6	7	0	.462		
1934–35	Independent	–	–	–	–	–	–	–	–	–	11	5	6	0	.455		
1935–36	Independent	–	–	–	–	–	–	–	–	–	13	7	6	0	.538		
1936–37	NEIHL	7	5	2	0	–	–	–	–	2nd	14	8	6	0	.571		
1937–38	NEIHL	8	5	1	2	–	–	–	–	1st	15	9	4	2	.667		
1938–39	NEIHL	6	6	0	0	–	–	–	–	1st	14	10	4	0	.714		
1939–40	NEIHL	6	4	2	0	–	–	–	–	3rd	12	4	5	3	.458		
Sydney Brofsky (1940 — 1941)
1940–41	NEIHL	9	6	3	0	–	–	–	–	3rd	14	7	6	1	.536		
Wayland Vaughan (1941 — 1943)
1941–42	NEIHL	8	3	5	0	–	–	–	–	4th	14	3	11	0	.214		
1942–43	NEIHL	8	2	6	0	–	–	–	–	T–5th	13	2	11	0	.154		
Program suspended due to World War II
Harry Cleverly (1945 — 1962)
1945–46	Independent	–	–	–	–	–	–	–	–	–	3	2	0	1	.833		
1946–47	NEIHL	12	11	0	1	–	–	–	–	1st	21	15	5	1	.738		
1947–48	NEIHL	13	12	1	0	–	–	–	–	1st	24	20	4	0	.833	Lost Semifinal 5–8 (Northeastern) Won Consolation 18–4 (Bowdoin)	
1948–49	NEIHL	9	7	2	0	–	–	–	–	3rd	20	13	7	0	.650	Won Semifinal 13–1 (MIT) Lost Championship 5–6 (Boston College)	
1949–50	NEIHL	9	8	1	0	–	–	–	–	1st	23	18	5	0	.783	Won Semifinal 11–2 (Northeastern) Lost Championship 1–2 (Boston College)	Won National Semifinal 4–3 (Michigan); Lost National Championship 4–13 (Colorado College)
1950–51	NEIHL	7	6	1	0	–	–	–	–	T–2nd	21	16	5	0	.762	Won Semifinal 5–0 (Northeastern) Won Championship 4–1 (Boston College)	Lost Semifinal 2–8 (Michigan); Won Consolation Game 7–4 (Colorado College)
1951–52	NEIHL	7	5	2	0	–	–	–	–	4th	19	15	3	1	.816	Won Semifinal 3–1 (Northeastern) Won Championship 3–1 (Brown)	
1952–53	NEIHL	6	5	1	0	–	–	–	–	2nd	22	14	7	1	.659		Lost National Semifinal 2–14 (Michigan); Lost Consolation Game 3–6 (Rensselaer)
1953–54	NEIHL	6	2	4	0	–	–	–	–	T–8th	20	4	15	1	.225		
1954–55	Independent	–	–	–	–	–	–	–	–	–	23	4	19	0	.174		
1955–56	Independent	–	–	–	–	–	–	–	–	–	22	11	11	0	.500		
1956–57	Independent	–	–	–	–	–	–	–	–	–	23	13	9	1	.587		
1957–58	Independent	–	–	–	–	–	–	–	–	–	23	17	5	1	.761		
1958–59	Independent	–	–	–	–	–	–	–	–	–	23	13	8	2	.609		
1959–60	Independent	–	–	–	–	–	–	–	–	–	27	19	8	0	.704		Lost National Semifinal 4–6 (Denver); Won Consolation Game 7–6 (St. Lawrence)
1960–61	Independent	–	–	–	–	–	–	–	–	–	24	10	14	0	.417		
1961–62	ECAC Hockey	24	7	16	1	–	–	–	.313	22nd	25	7	17	1	.300		
Jack Kelley (1962 — 1972)
1962–63	ECAC Hockey	22	7	15	0	–	–	–	.318	22nd	23	7	16	0	.304		
1963–64	ECAC Hockey	21	9	12	0	–	–	–	.429	20th	22	9	13	0	.409		
University Division
1964–65	ECAC Hockey	18	15	3	0	–	–	–	.833	1st	31	25	6	0	.806	Won Quarterfinal 5–3 (Providence); Lost Semifinal 2–5 (Brown); Won Third-place game 4–0 (Clarkson)	
1965–66	ECAC Hockey	19	17	2	0	–	–	–	.895	2nd	35	27	8	0	.771	Won Quarterfinal 4–1 (Northeastern); Lost Semifinal 1–8 (Cornell); Won Third-place game 5–2 (Brown)	Lost National Semifinal 1–2 (Michigan State); Lost Consolation Game 3–4 (Denver)
1966–67	ECAC Hockey	20	19	0	1	–	–	–	.975	1st	31	25	5	1	.823	Won Quarterfinal 6–2 (Harvard); Won Semifinal 6–2 (St. Lawrence); Lost Championship 3–4 (Cornell)	Won National Semifinal 4–2 (Michigan State); Lost National Championship 1–4 (Cornell)
1967–68	ECAC Hockey	21	13	6	2	–	–	–	.667	T–4th	32	20	9	3	.672	Won Quarterfinal 6–3 (Harvard); Lost Semifinal 2–7 (Cornell); Lost Third-place game 1–4 (Clarkson)	
1968–69	ECAC Hockey	21	13	8	0	–	–	–	.619	6th	30	19	10	1	.650	Won Quarterfinal 4–2 (Rensselaer); Lost Semifinal 2–3 (Cornell); Won Third-place game 5–0 (Clarkson)	
1969–70	ECAC Hockey	22	17	5	0	–	–	–	.773	3rd	27	20	7	0	.741	Won Quarterfinal 2–0 (New Hampshire); Lost Semifinal 4–5 (Clarkson); Won Third-place game 8–2 (Harvard)	
1970–71	ECAC Hockey	20	18	1	1	–	–	–	.925	1st	31	28	2	1	.919	Won Quarterfinal 11–0 (Rensselaer); Lost Semifinal 2–4 (Harvard); Won Third-place game 6–5 (Cornell)	Won National Semifinal 4–2 (Denver); Won National Championship 4–2 (Minnesota)
1971–72	ECAC Hockey	20	15	4	1	–	–	–	.775	3rd	31	26	4	1	.855	Won Quarterfinal 8–2 (Rensselaer); Won Semifinal 3–1 (Harvard); Won Championship 4–1 (Cornell)	Won National Semifinal 4–1 (Wisconsin); Won National Championship 4–0 (Cornell)
Leon Abbott (1972 — 1973)
1972–73	ECAC Hockey	18	9†	8†	1†	–	–	–	.528†	8th†	29	11†	17†	1†	.397†	Lost Quarterfinal 3–7 (Pennsylvania)	
Division I
Jack Parker (1973 — 2013)
1973–74	ECAC Hockey	20	14‡	6‡	0‡	–	–	–	.700‡	3rd‡	31	23‡	8‡	0‡	.742‡	Won Quarterfinal 8–0 (Dartmouth); Won Semifinal 7–3 (Cornell); Won Championship 4–2 (Harvard)	Lost National Semifinal 4–5 (Minnesota); Won Consolation Game 7–5 (Harvard)
1974–75	ECAC Hockey	22	20	2	0	–	–	–	.909	2nd	32	26	5	1	.828	Won Quarterfinal 5–4 (Brown); Won Semifinal 7–3 (Vermont); Won Championship 7–3 (Harvard)	Lost National Semifinal 5–9 (Michigan Tech); Won Consolation Game 10–5 (Harvard)
1975–76	ECAC Hockey	23	21	2	0	–	–	–	.915	1st	30	25	5	0	.833	Won Quarterfinal 6–5 (Boston College); Won Semifinal 8–4 (Harvard); Won Championship 9–2 (Brown)	Lost National Semifinal 2–4 (Minnesota); Lost Consolation Game 7–8 (Brown)
1976–77	ECAC Hockey	24	16	7	1	–	–	–	.688	4th	34	22	11	1	.662	Won Quarterfinal 8–7 (Boston College); Won Semifinal 7–6 (Clarkson); Won Championship 8–6 (New Hampshire)	Lost National Semifinal 4–6 (Michigan); Won Consolation Game 6–5 (New Hampshire)
1977–78	ECAC Hockey	22	21	1	0	–	–	–	.955	1st	32	30	2	0	.938	Won Quarterfinal 6–5 (New Hampshire); Lost Semifinal 1–5 (Providence); Won Third-place game 8–4 (Brown)	Won First round 5–3 (Providence); Won National Semifinal 5–2 (Wisconsin); Won National Championship 5–3 (Boston College)
1978–79	ECAC Hockey	23	17	4	2	–	–	–	.783	1st	30	21	7	2	.733	Won Quarterfinal 4–3 (Vermont); Lost Semifinal 3–5 (Dartmouth); Lost Third-place game 4–7 (Cornell)	
1979–80	ECAC Hockey	22	8	14	0	–	–	–	.364	14th	28	11	17	0	.393		
1980–81	ECAC Hockey	22	10	12	0	–	–	–	.455	12th	29	14	15	0	.483		
1981–82	ECAC Hockey	22	9	10	3	–	–	–	.477	T–10th	28	14	11	3	.554		
1982–83	ECAC Hockey	21	14	7	0	–	–	–	.667	6th	30	18	11	1	.617	Lost Quarterfinal series 0–1–1 (New Hampshire)	
1983–84	ECAC Hockey	21	15	6	0	–	–	–	.714	T–2nd	40	28	11	1	.713	Won Quarterfinal series 2–1 (New Hampshire); Won Semifinal 6–4 (Boston College); Lost Championship 2–5 (Rensselaer)	Lost Quarterfinal series 7–8 (Bowling Green)
1984–85	Hockey East	34	19	11	4	–	–	–	42	2nd	42	24	14	4	.619	Won Quarterfinal series 2–0 (Maine); Lost Semifinal 2–5 (Providence); Won Consolation Game 6–4 (Lowell)	
1985–86	Hockey East	34	20	11	3	–	–	–	43	2nd	43	25	14	4	.628	Won Quarterfinal series 5–4 (New Hampshire); Won Semifinal 3–2 (Providence); Won Championship 9–4 (Boston College)	Lost Quarterfinal series 7–11 (Minnesota)
1986–87	Hockey East	32	15	14	3	–	–	–	33	4th	37	19	15	3	.554	Lost Quarterfinal 2–3 (Northeastern)	
1987–88	Hockey East	26	11	12	3	–	–	–	25	3rd	34	14	17	3	.456	Lost Quarterfinal series 6–9 (Providence)	
1988–89	Hockey East	26	10	15	1	–	–	–	21	5th	36	14	21	1	.403	Lost Quarterfinal 2–3 (Providence)	
1989–90	Hockey East	21	12	7	2	–	–	–	26	3rd	44	25	17	2	.591	Won Quarterfinal series 2–1 (Northeastern); Lost Semifinal 1–3 (Maine)	Won First round series 2–1 (North Dakota); Won National Quarterfinal series 2–1 (Michigan State); Lost National Semifinal 2–3 (Colgate)
1990–91	Hockey East	21	13	6	2	–	–	–	28	3rd	41	28	11	2	.707	Won Quarterfinal 7–1 (Merrimack); Won Semifinal 7–5 (Providence); Won Championship 4–3 (Maine)	Won National Quarterfinal series 2–0 (Michigan); Won National Semifinal 7–3 (Clarkson); Lost National Championship 7–8 (Northern Michigan)
1991–92	Hockey East	21	11^	6^	4^	–	–	–	26^	T–2nd^	35	23^	8^	4^	.714^	Lost Quarterfinal 2–5 (Boston College)	Lost regional quarterfinal 2–4 (Michigan State)
1992–93	Hockey East	24	18	5	1	–	–	–	37	2nd	40	29	9	2	.750	Won Quarterfinal series 11–3 (Boston College); Won Semifinal 2–0 (New Hampshire); Lost Championship 2–5 (Maine)	Won Regional Semifinal 4–1 (Northern Michigan); Lost National Semifinal 1–6 (Lake Superior State)
1993–94	Hockey East	24	21	3	0	–	–	–	42	1st	41	34	7	0	.829	Won Quarterfinal series 12–8 (Maine); Won Semifinal 5–2 (Northeastern); Won Championship 3–2 (Massachusetts–Lowell)	Won Regional Semifinal 4–1 (Wisconsin); Won National Semifinal 4–1 (Minnesota); Lost National Championship 1–9 (Lake Superior State)
1994–95	Hockey East	24	16	5	3	–	–	2	88	T–1st	40	31	6	3	.813	Won Quarterfinal 4–3 (Merrimack); Won Semifinal 4–2 (Massachusetts–Lowell); Won Championship 3–2 (Providence)	Won Regional Semifinal 6–2 (Lake Superior State); Won National Semifinal 7–3 (Minnesota); Won National Championship 6–2 (Maine)
1995–96	Hockey East	24	17	5	2	–	–	1	90	1st	40	30	7	3	.788	Won Quarterfinal series 2–0 (Massachusetts); Lost Semifinal 4–5 (Providence)	Won Regional Semifinal 3–2 (Clarkson); Lost National Semifinal 0–4 (Michigan)
1996–97	Hockey East	24	16	4	4	–	–	–	36	T–1st	41	26	9	6	.707	Won Quarterfinal series 2–0 (Northeastern); Won Semifinal 3–2 (Massachusetts–Lowell); Won Championship 4–2 (New Hampshire)	Won Regional Semifinal 4–3 (Denver); Won National Semifinal 3–2 (Michigan); Lost National Championship 4–6 (North Dakota)
1997–98	Hockey East	24	18	4	2	–	–	–	38	1st	38	28	8	2	.763	Lost Quarterfinal series 1–2 (Merrimack)	Lost Regional Semifinal 3–4 (New Hampshire)
1998–99	Hockey East	24	8	13	3	–	–	–	19	5th	37	14	20	3	.419	Lost Quarterfinal series 1–2 (Providence)	
1999–00	Hockey East	24	15	3	6	–	–	–	36	1st	42	25	10	7	.679	Won Quarterfinal series 2–0 (Massachusetts); Lost Semifinal 2–4 (Maine)	Won regional quarterfinal 5–3 (St. Cloud State); Lost Regional Semifinal 4–3 (St. Lawrence)
2000–01	Hockey East	24	9	12	3	–	–	–	23	5th	37	14	20	3	.419	Lost Quarterfinal series 1–2 (Providence)	
2001–02	Hockey East	24	15	6	3	–	–	–	33	T–2nd	38	25	10	3	.697	Won Quarterfinal series 2–0 (Providence); Lost Semifinal 3–4 (Maine)	Lost Regional Semifinal 3–4 (Maine)
2002–03	Hockey East	24	13	10	1	–	–	–	27	T–4th	42	25	14	3	.631	Won Quarterfinal series 2–0 (Providence); Won Semifinal 6–5 (Boston College); Lost Championship 0–1 (New Hampshire)	Won Regional Semifinal 6–4 (Harvard); Lost Regional Final 0–3 (New Hampshire)
2003–04	Hockey East	24	6	13	5	–	–	–	17	8th	38	12	17	9	.434	Won Quarterfinal series 2–1 (Boston College); Lost Semifinal 0–1 (Maine)	
2004–05	Hockey East	24	15	5	4	–	–	–	34	T–2nd	41	23	14	4	.610	Won Quarterfinal series 2–1 (Providence); Lost Semifinal 2–5 (New Hampshire)	Lost Regional Semifinal 0–4 (North Dakota)
2005–06	Hockey East	27	17	7	3	–	–	–	37	1st	40	26	10	4	.700	Won Quarterfinal series 2–0 (Massachusetts); Won Semifinal 9–2 (New Hampshire); Won Championship 2–1 (Boston College)	Won Regional Semifinal 9–2 (Nebraska–Omaha); Lost Regional Final 0–5 (Boston College)
2006–07	Hockey East	27	13	6	8	–	–	–	34	3rd	39	20	10	9	.628	Won Quarterfinal series 2–1 (Vermont); Lost Semifinal 2–6 (Boston College)	Lost Regional Semifinal 1–5 (Michigan State)
2007–08	Hockey East	27	15	9	3	–	–	–	33	2nd	40	19	17	4	.525	Won Quarterfinal series 2–1 (Massachusetts–Lowell); Lost Semifinal 1–3 (Vermont)	
2008–09	Hockey East	27	18	5	4	–	–	–	40	1st	45	35	6	4	.822	Won Quarterfinal series 2–1 (Maine); Won Semifinal 3–2 (Boston College); Won Championship 1–0 (Massachusetts–Lowell)	Won Regional Semifinal 8–3 (Ohio State); Won Regional Final 2–1 (New Hampshire); Won National Semifinal 5–4 (Vermont); Won National Championship 4–3 (Miami)
2009–10	Hockey East	27	13	12	2	–	–	–	28	T–3rd	38	18	17	3	.513	Won Quarterfinal series 2–1 (Merrimack); Lost Semifinal 2–5 (Maine)	
2010–11	Hockey East	27	15	6	6	–	–	–	36	3rd	39	19	12	8	.590	Lost Quarterfinal series 2–1 (Northeastern)	
2011–12	Hockey East	27	17	9	1	–	–	–	35	T–2nd	39	23	15	1	.603	Won Quarterfinal series 2–1 (New Hampshire); Lost Semifinal 3–5 (Maine)	Lost Regional Semifinal 3–7 (Minnesota)
2012–13	Hockey East	27	15	10	2	–	–	–	32	T–3rd	39	21	16	2	.564	Won Quarterfinal series 2–0 (Merrimack); Won Semifinal 6–3 (Boston College); Lost Championship 0–1 (Massachusetts–Lowell)	
David Quinn (2013 — 2018)
2013–14	Hockey East	20	5	12	3	–	–	–	13	9th	35	10	21	4	.343		
2014–15	Hockey East	22	14	5	3	–	–	–	31	1st	41	28	8	5	.744	Won Quarterfinal series 2–0 (Merrimack); Won Semifinal 4–1 (New Hampshire); Won Championship 5–3 (Massachusetts–Lowell)	Won Regional Semifinal 3–2 (Yale); Won Regional Final 3–2 (Minnesota–Duluth); Won NationalSemifinal 5–3 (North Dakota); Lost National Championship 3–4 (Providence)
2015–16	Hockey East	22	12	6	4	–	–	–	28	T–4th	36	21	10	5	.653	Won Opening Round series 2–0 (Massachusetts); Lost Quarterfinal series 0–2 (Massachusetts–Lowell)	Lost Regional Semifinal 2–7 (Denver)
2016–17	Hockey East	22	13	6	3	–	–	–	29	T–1st	39	24	12	3	.654	Won Quarterfinal series 2–0 (Northeastern); Lost Semifinal 2–3 (Boston College)	Won Regional Semifinal 4–3 (North Dakota); Lost Regional Final 2–3 (Minnesota–Duluth)
2017–18	Hockey East	24	12	8	4	–	–	–	28	4th	40	22	14	4	.600	Won Quarterfinal series 2–0 (Connecticut); Won Semifinal 4–3 (Boston College); Won Championship 2–0 (Providence)	Won Regional Semifinal 3–1 (Cornell); Lost Regional Final 3–6 (Michigan)
Albie O'Connell (2018 — 2022)
2018–19	Hockey East	24	12	9	3	–	–	–	27	5th	38	16	18	4	.474	Won Quarterfinal series, 2–1 (Massachusetts–Lowell); Lost Semifinal, 1–2 (OT) (Northeastern)	
2019–20	Hockey East	24	10	9	5	–	–	–	25	6th	34	13	13	8	.500	Tournament Cancelled	
2020–21	Hockey East	14	10	3	1	3	1	1	.714	2nd	16	10	5	1	.656	Lost Quarterfinal, 1–2 (Massachusetts–Lowell)	Lost Regional Semifinal, 2–6 (St. Cloud State)
2021–22	Hockey East	24	13	8	3	3	2	0	41	T–4th	35	19	13	3	.586	Lost Quarterfinal, 1–3 (Connecticut)	
Jay Pandolfo (2022 — Present)
2022–23	Hockey East	24	18	6	0	2	2	0	54	1st	40	29	11	0	.725	Won Quarterfinal, 3–1 (Vermont); Won Semifinal, 2–1 (OT) (Providence); Won Championship, 5–3 (Merrimack)	Won Regional Semifinal, 5–1 (Western Michigan); Won Regional Final, 2–1 (Cornell); Lost National Semifinal, 2–6 (Minnesota)
2023–24	Hockey East	24	18	4	2	1	1	1	57	2nd	40	28	10	2	.725	Won Quarterfinal, 4–2 (Northeastern); Won Semifinal, 4–1 (Maine); Lost Championship, 2–6 (Boston College)	Won Regional Semifinal, 6–3 (RIT); Won Regional Final, 6–3 (Minnesota); Lost National Semifinal, 1–2 (OT) (Denver)
2024–25	Hockey East	24	14	8	2	1	1	2	46	3rd	40	24	14	2	.625	Won Quarterfinal, 3–2 (OT) (Massachusetts); Lost Semifinal, 2–5 (Connecticut)	Won Regional Semifinal, 8–3 (Ohio State); Won Regional Final, 3–2 (OT) (Cornell); Won National Semifinal, 3–1 (Penn State); Lost National Championship, 2–6 (Western Michigan)
2025-26	Hockey East	24	12	12	0	3	2	0	35	6th	36	17	17	2	.500	Won Quarterfinal, 4-1 (Vermont) Lost Semifinal, 3-5 (Connecticut)	
Totals											GP	W	L	T	%	Championships	
Regular Season											2635	1544	906	185	.623	6 ECAC Hockey Championships, 12 Hockey East Championships	
Conference Post-season											177	115	60	2	.657	5 ECAC Hockey tournament championships, 10 Hockey East tournament championships	
NCAA Post-season											89	50	39	0	.562	39 NCAA Tournament appearances	
Regular Season and Post-season Record											2901	2709	1005	187	.623	5 NCAA Division I National Championships	

* Winning percentage is used when conference schedules are unbalanced.
† BU was forced to forfeit 11 games after the season for using an ineligible player.
‡ Leon Abbot was fired 6 games into the season and replaced by Jack Parker.
^ Maine was forced to forfeit 13 games after the season for using an ineligible player.
bold and italic are program records
