= Frank Farrell =

Frank Farrell may refer to:

- Frank J. Farrell (1866–1926), American baseball executive
- Frank Farrell (rugby league) (1916–1985), Australian rugby league footballer and policeman
- Frank Farrell (musician) (1947–1997), bassist of Supertramp
- Franklin Farrell (1908–2003), American ice hockey player

== See also ==
- Frank O'Farrell
