= 1926–27 Princeton Tigers men's ice hockey season =

College ice hockey season

- Conference: Independent
- Home ice: Hobey Baker Memorial Rink

Record
- Overall: 5–7–1
- Home: 5–2–1
- Road: 0–2–0
- Neutral: 0–3–0

Coaches and captains
- Head coach: Beattie Ramsay
- Captain: Austin Davis

The 1926–27 Princeton Tigers men's ice hockey season was the 27th season of play for the program. The Tigers represented Princeton University and were coached Beattie Ramsay in his 3rd season.

== Season ==
=== Conference dissolved ===
During the offseason, Harvard decided to withdraw from the Triangular Hockey League and cancel their annual meeting with Princeton. Other than the war year in 1918, this would be the first season that Harvard and Princeton would not play one another since 1904. Due in part to this development, Princeton got a jump on their season and began training in mid-November before the Baker Rink was ready. A problem with the refrigeration system caused a delay but, by the end of the month, the 50 candidates were able to get onto the ice.

=== Early season ===
With their schedule no longer centered around conference play, Princeton had to search for additional opponents. They secured a match with the Knickerbocker Club in early December, the program's earliest start date since 1908. The team, having been on the ice for just over a week, looked ragged against the New Yorkers but managed to hold their own. Hughes played a good game in goal despite a lack of help from the defense while the offense showed flashes of ability. G Jones scored the winning goal just moments before the end of regulation, however, in order to get some additional practice time, the two teams agreed to play an unofficial overtime period afterwards. A few days later, the team faced off against another amateur team, the St. Nicholas Hockey Club. Unfortunately team captain Austin Davis had been injured in the Knickerbocker match and was unavailable to participate. Early on, the Tigers didn't seem to notice as the Pitman scored twice in the opening minutes. With a 3–1 lead after one period, the team looked no worse for wear, however, the visitors charged hard in the middle frame. Hughes was peppered by shots in the second and, though he made several big saves, the amateurs were nonetheless able to score three times and take the lead. Strubing evened the count just before the end of the period, leading to an all-important third. While Pitman finished off his hat-trick, St. Nicks also scored and the match was tied at the end of regulation. Because St. Nicholas had to catch a train, no overtime was held and the game finished as a draw.

Two days later, the team had a match scheduled against the New York Athletic Club. However, the train carrying the visiting team was delayed for two hours due to a wreck on the Pennsylvania Railroad. While the club did eventually arrive, they no longer had time to play a full game so a 40-minute exhibition match was held instead. Coach Ramsay used the contest to give much needed game time to all his players. In the end, however, it was the two starting forwards, Pitman and Jones, who scored the two goals, witnessed by just a dozen spectators. The team then wrapped up its pre-Christmas slate with a fourth amateur set, the Crescent Athletic Club. The team's defense looked much more focused than it had in the earlier matches and provided some much-needed scoring as well. Still without Davis, the forward lines weren't able to score much on their own. However, after halting the visitor's attack, Trenholm, who had returned to campus after a year away, scored three consecutive goals to give the team a win.

=== Holiday trip ===
After opening the year going undefeated in four games, the Tigers began their annual holiday trip at Madison Square Garden. They faced Toronto, who may have been the best college team in all of Canada, and produced its best effort to date. Princeton showed up ready to play with Trenholm scoring just 37 into the match. The two teams then traded blows all evening, with the lead see-sawing back and forth. The two were tied after 60 minutes and overtime was required. Toronto got their lead back just over a minute into the first extra period and were able to hold off Princeton to escape with a win. Despite the loss, the Tigers had proven themselves to be a formidable squad and Hughes was sensational with 43 saves in the game. At the end of the month, the team was in Montreal to face Laval and produced an almost identical result. With four players scoring in the game, Princeton seemed to have put together a solid offense but their team defense still needed some work.

After New Year's, Princeton returned to MSG to meet Dartmouth in their first intercollegiate game of the season. They began well, holding a 1–0 lead after the first, but then crumbled under the weight of a superior starting lineup. The team then returned home for a brief pause before resuming against another Canadian outfit in Western Ontario. The Tigers were able to end their 3-game skid thanks to a fantastic exhibition from the offense. Five different Tigers scored in the match while Hughes made 35 stops despite battling through a bout of conjunctivitis.

=== Defensive troubles ===
After their hectic schedule to begin the year, Princeton would only play four games over the succeeding five weeks. With plenty of time to practice between matches, the Tigers were hoping to resolve some of their shortcomings, specifically on the back end. However, when Yale arrived for the first meeting of the year, the Elis steamrolled Princeton to the tune of 1–9. The Bulldogs were in control from the jump, outskating the Tigers and getting a jump on the home team anytime they dared to get near the puck. A near total lack of teamwork hampered Princeton's game, including a failure of the forwards to backcheck. Hughes was still dealing with poor vision and made several errors through the match. Rennard eventually replaced him in goal but did not perform much better. The poor effort in recent matches was criticized and the school paper questioned why the team had taken an unnecessary trip to Canada when they could have just as easily spent the time at home practicing. Captain Davis and coach Ramsay responded by refuting the claim that the team had not practiced during their trip. They both placed the blame on the team not being as talented as either Yale or Dartmouth, rather than resulting from a lack of preparation.

Fueled by the charges levied against them, the Tigers entered the game against Cornell looking for blood and they took no mercy on the hapless reds. With greater alacrity than they had shown all season, the Princeton forwards clobbered Cornell in the final two periods, outscoring them 7–0 after an even first. Strubing and Jones each scored twice while only a masterful performance in goal from the visiting netminder prevented an even more lopsided victory. Feeling that they had been vindicated, the team returned to Madison Square Garden for their fourth and final game against a Canadian college. The Redmen had already downed both Harvard and Yale, meaning that Princeton would be facing perhaps its biggest challenge yet. From the opening faceoff, the Tigers were obviously the weaker of the two. While the Nassau club scored twice, the Canadians netted 5 goals in the opening period, setting the tone with far superior teamwork. The next two periods also saw McGill outscore the American side and end the match without using a single substitution.

=== Poor finish ===
After pausing for the exam week, the team resumed practicing ahead of their rematches with Dartmouth and Yale. With the Indians in town, the team tried their best to keep up with the potent lineup but the Greens were just too fast. Rennard, who was making his first start, was brilliant in goal but he was outshone by the opposing netminder. Princeton was able to get the first goal but it was the only marker to their credit and the team failed once again to live up to expectations. The next week the team made their first appearance at the New Haven Arena since its resurrection. The Elis continued to that show Princeton's lack of speed was a critical failing that was made even worse when Davis was lost to injury just 2 minutes into the match. While Pitman recorded a hat-trick in the game, Yale nearly tripled that total and swept the Tigers off of the ice.

With such a poor showing for most of the year, Princeton got one final chance at redemption when they hosted Williams in the finale. They were met by a squad who had not been able to practice in 10 days thanks to a lack of ice at their own home rink. It was no small wonder that Princeton was able to capitalize on their hamstrung opponents and score the first 5 goals of the games. Jones was the leader on offense with 5 goals to his credit but it was too little too late for the Tigers and the victory closed a lamentable season.

Edward E. Colladay served as team manager with Sheldon S. Reynolds as his assistant.

== Roster ==
No.	Nat.	Player	Class	Pos	Height	Weight	DoB	Hometown	Previous team
	(United States)	James Carey	Sophomore	RW				Short Hills, New Jersey
	(United States)	Robert H. Casey	Senior	D/F			1904-05-14	Utica, New York
	(United States)	Austin D. S. Davis (C)	Senior	D/RW			1903-08-28	Albany, New York
	(United States)	Richard F. Green	Senior	D				Elizabeth, New Jersey
	(United States)	Henry K. Harding	Junior	C/LW			1904-12-20	Dedham, Massachusetts
	(United States)	Andrew H. M. Hughes	Junior	G				Edgewater Park, New Jersey
	(United States)	Graham Jones	Sophomore	LW/RW				Hartford, Connecticut
	(United States)	John R. Pitman Jr.	Senior	LW/RW				Orange, New Jersey
	(United States)	Theodore H. Price Jr.	Sophomore	RW				New York, New York
	(United States)	Joseph C. Rennard	Junior	G			1903-07-06	New York, New York
	(United States)	Edward W. Rice	Sophomore	C				Upper Montclair, New Jersey
	(United States)	Raymond A. Ruge	Sophomore	LW				Lake Mahopac, New York
	(United States)	John Stevens	Sophomore	D				Meriden, Connecticut
	(United States)	Philip H. Strubing Jr.	Sophomore	C			1907-08-09	Philadelphia, Pennsylvania
	(United States)	Henry W. Taylor	Junior	D			1904-10-04	Plainfield, New Jersey
	(United States)	George T. Trenholm	Senior	D			1902-11-11	Saint Paul, Minnesota

== Standings ==
1926–27 Eastern Collegiate ice hockey standings
	Intercollegiate							Overall					
	GP	W	L	T	Pct.	GF	GA	GP	W	L	T	GF	GA
Amherst	8	3	2	3	.563	9	9	8	3	2	3	9	9
Army	3	0	2	1	.167	5	13	4	0	3	1	7	20
Bates	8	4	3	1	.563	17	18	10	6	3	1	22	19
Boston College	2	1	1	0	.500	2	3	6	3	3	0	15	18
Boston University	7	2	4	1	.357	25	18	8	2	5	1	25	23
Bowdoin	8	3	5	0	.375	17	23	9	4	5	0	26	24
Brown	8	4	4	0	.500	16	26	8	4	4	0	16	26
Clarkson	9	8	1	0	.889	42	11	9	8	1	0	42	11
Colby	7	3	4	0	.429	16	12	7	3	4	0	16	12
Cornell	7	1	6	0	.143	10	23	7	1	6	0	10	23
Dartmouth	–	–	–	–	–	–	–	15	11	2	2	68	20
Hamilton	–	–	–	–	–	–	–	10	6	4	0	–	–
Harvard	8	7	0	1	.938	32	9	12	9	1	2	44	18
Massachusetts Agricultural	7	2	4	1	.357	5	10	7	2	4	1	5	10
Middlebury	6	6	0	0	1.000	25	7	6	6	0	0	25	7
MIT	8	3	4	1	.438	19	21	8	3	4	1	19	21
New Hampshire	6	6	0	0	1.000	22	7	6	6	0	0	22	7
Norwich	–	–	–	–	–	–	–	–	–	–	–	–	–
NYU	–	–	–	–	–	–	–	–	–	–	–	–	–
Princeton	6	2	4	0	.333	24	32	13	5	7	1	55	64
Providence	–	–	–	–	–	–	–	8	1	7	0	13	39
Rensselaer	–	–	–	–	–	–	–	3	0	2	1	–	–
St. Lawrence	–	–	–	–	–	–	–	7	3	4	0	–	–
Syracuse	–	–	–	–	–	–	–	–	–	–	–	–	–
Union	5	3	2	0	.600	18	14	5	3	2	0	18	14
Vermont	–	–	–	–	–	–	–	–	–	–	–	–	–
Williams	12	6	6	0	.500	38	40	12	6	6	0	38	40
Yale	12	8	3	1	.708	72	26	16	8	7	1	80	45
YMCA College	7	3	4	0	.429	16	19	7	3	4	0	16	19

== Schedule and results ==
Date	Opponent	Site	Result	Record
Regular Season
December 8	Knickerbocker Club*	Hobey Baker Memorial Rink • Princeton, New Jersey	W 4–3	1–0–0
December 11	St. Nicholas Hockey Club*	Hobey Baker Memorial Rink • Princeton, New Jersey	T 5–5	1–0–1
December 13	New York Athletic Club*	Hobey Baker Memorial Rink • Princeton, New Jersey (Exhibition)	W 2–1	
December 17	Crescent Athletic Club*	Hobey Baker Memorial Rink • Princeton, New Jersey	W 4–1	2–0–1
December 27	vs. Toronto*	Madison Square Garden • Manhattan, New York	L 4–5 ^{2OT}	2–1–1
December 30	at Laval*	Montreal, Quebec	L 4–5	2–2–1
January 6	vs. Dartmouth*	Madison Square Garden • Manhattan, New York	L 2–7	2–3–1
January 8	Western Ontario*	Hobey Baker Memorial Rink • Princeton, New Jersey	W 6–4 ^{2OT}	3–3–1
January 15	Yale*	Hobey Baker Memorial Rink • Princeton, New Jersey	L 1–9	3–4–1
January 22	Cornell*	Hobey Baker Memorial Rink • Princeton, New Jersey	W 8–1	4–4–1
January 29	vs. McGill*	Madison Square Garden • Manhattan, New York	L 4–9	4–5–1
February 17	Dartmouth*	Hobey Baker Memorial Rink • Princeton, New Jersey	L 1–4	4–6–1
February 22	at Yale*	New Haven Arena • New Haven, Connecticut	L 3–8	4–7–1
February 26	Williams*	Hobey Baker Memorial Rink • Princeton, New Jersey	W 9–3	5–7–1
*Non-conference game.
