= Wayland Vaughan =

American ice hockey coach

Biographical details
- Born: November 3, 1901; Janesville, Wisconsin, U.S.
- Died: January 21, 1961 (aged 59); Needham, Massachusetts, U.S.
- Education: Yale University

Playing career
- 1922–1923: Yale

Coaching career (HC unless noted)
- 1928–1940: Boston University
- 1941–1943: Boston University

Head coaching record
- Overall: 86–83–8 (.509)

Wayland Farries Vaughan (November 3, 1901 – January 21, 1961) was an American ice hockey player and coach who led the Boston University Terriers men's ice hockey team from 1928 until 1943.

== Early life ==
Vaughan was born on November 3, 1901 in Janesville, Wisconsin. He was one of two sons born to Richard Miner and Eleanor Jane (Farries) Vaughn. His father was a member of the faculty at the Newton Theological Institution. His brother, Richard, attended Yale University and was captain of the ice hockey team in 1928.

Vaughan graduated from Newton High School and Phillips Academy. He attended Yale University, where was a member of the freshmen wrestling and tennis teams, was a varsity tennis player his sophomore and junior years, and a member of the Yale Bulldogs men's ice hockey team his senior year. He graduated in 1923. He then attended Harvard University, where he earned his Master of Arts and Doctor of Philosophy degrees.

== Academic career ==
Vaughan was hired joined the faculty of the Boston University College of Liberal Arts in 1926. He became an assistant professor in 1928 and a professor in 1933. He was head of the university's psychology department from 1934 until he suffered a heart attack in 1946. From 1936 to 1957, he was a lecturer at the Harvard Extension School. He contributed to articles to professional journals and magazines and authored a number of books, including The Law of Superiority, Social Psychology, and Personal and Social Adjustment. He remained a member of the B.U. faculty until his death in 1961.

== Coaching ==
Vaughan became the head coach of the Boston University men's ice hockey team after the resignation of Chippy Gaw in 1928. He took a sabbatical during the 1940 season and was replaced on a temporary basis by former Terrier Syd Borofsky. He returned in 1941 and continued to coach until the hockey program was suspended in 1943 due to World War II. In all, Vaughan compiled an 86–83–7 record as a head coach.

== Death ==
Vaughan died on January 21, 1961 at his home in Needham, Massachusetts. He was survived by his wife, the former Clara Colton, and four children.

== Head coaching record ==
Record table
Season	Team	Overall	Conference	Standing	Postseason
Boston University Terriers Independent (1928–1940)
1928–29	Boston University	9–2–1			
1929–30	Boston University	4–8–1			
1930–31	Boston University	6–6–0			
1931–32	Boston University	6–4–0			
1932–33	Boston University	7–3–0			
1933–34	Boston University	6–7–0			
1934–35	Boston University	5–6–0			
1935–36	Boston University	7–6–0			
Boston University:		50–42–2			
Boston University Terriers (NEIHL) (1936–1940)
1936–37	Boston University	8–6–0	5–2–0		
1937–38	Boston University	9–4–2	5–1–2		
1938–39	Boston University	10–4–0	6–0–0		
1939–40	Boston University	4–5–3	4–2–0		
Boston University:		31–19–5	20–5–2		
Boston University Terriers (NEIHL) (1941–1943)
1941–42	Boston University	3–11–0	3–5–0		
1942–43	Boston University	2–11–0	2–6–0		
Boston University:		5–22–0	5–11–0		
Total:		86–83–7			
National champion Postseason invitational champion Conference regular season champion Conference regular season and conference tournament champion Division regular season champion Division regular season and conference tournament champion Conference tournament champion
