= Kay Todd Jr. =

American football and ice hockey player (1910–1944)

Personal information
- Born: February 10, 1910; Saint Paul, Minnesota, U.S.
- Died: June 12, 1944 (aged 34); Normandy, German-occupied France
- Position: Right halfback

Kay "Red" Todd Jr. (February 10, 1910 – June 12, 1944) was an American football player and ice hockey player who competed at the 1932 Summer Olympics. He also played hockey for Yale University.

== Personal life ==
Todd served in the United States Army during World War II. During the Normandy landings on June 6, 1944, he was part of the paratrooper force sent behind German lines. He was killed on June 12 attacking a machine-gun post during the Battle of Normandy.

== Hockey statistics ==
			Regular season					Playoffs
Season	Team	League	GP	G	A	Pts	PIM	GP	G	A	Pts	PIM
1929–32	Yale University Bulldogs	NCAA	–	–	–	–	–	–	–	–	–	–
Career totals			–	–	–	–	–	–	–	–	–	–
