= Lawrence Noble =

American ice hockey player

Biographical details
- Born: December 11, 1903; Monroe, Michigan, US
- Died: October 20, 1985 (aged 81); Westerly, Rhode Island, US
- Education: Yale University

Playing career
- 1924–1927: Yale
- Position: Forward / Defenseman

Coaching career (HC unless noted)
- 1927–1928: Yale freshmen
- 1928–1930: Yale

Head coaching record
- Overall: 32–2–2 (.917)

Accomplishments and honors

Championships
- 1925 East Intercollegiate Champion (player); 1928 East Freshman Champion; 1929 East Intercollegiate Champion; 1930 East Intercollegiate co-Champion

Lawrence Mason Noble was an American ice hockey forward, defenseman and coach. He led Yale to back-to-back intercollegiate championships in 1929 and 1930.

== Career ==
Born in Monroe, Michigan, Noble was raised in Syracuse, New York, and attended Kent School, a private prep school in Connecticut. After graduating, he began attending Yale University in the fall of 1923 and joined the freshman hockey team. Once he was eligible to play on the varsity teams, Noble was a member of the football and baseball teams but he excelled as a member of the ice hockey squad. As a sophomore, Noble played as a reserve forward, substituting in as required when the starters needed rest. That season he helped the Bulldogs win an intercollegiate title while losing just 1 game all season. The following year, Noble transitioned into a larger role with the team and began the year as a left wing, however, due to a rather poor season for the team he was shifted to defense. He remained on the blueline for his senior season and was named team captain for the program's first year as a major sport. Yale recovered with a solid season but was unable to get back to a championship level.

After graduating, Noble entered Yale Law School and spent his free time as the coach for the freshman hockey team. In his first year he helped the team win the yearling championship while also acting as an assistant coach for the varsity squad when required. Before the start of the following season, Clarence Wanamaker was transferred by the United States Rubber Company to a new posting in Williamsport, Pennsylvania, and would no longer be able to lead the varsity team. Noble was tabbed as his replacement in November and took over a team that had finished as the runners-up for the east intercollegiate title in 1928. Having played under Wanamaker, Noble continued to coach in the same style and the stability that provided enabled the Bulldogs to produce an outstanding season. In his first year behind the bench, Yale won 15 out of 17 games which included 8 shutouts. His second season was nearly as good with a 17–1–1 record, however, the Elis had to share the championship with Harvard.

Despite winning a championship in each of his three seasons as coach, Noble resigned from his position once he received his J. D. in 1930. He worked as an attorney afterwards but eventually found his vocation in education. He later became the director of admissions at Groton School.

== Personal ==
Noble married Louise McLanahan and the two remained together until his death in 1985. Their son, Lawrence Jr., also attended Yale, played on the ice hockey team, and served as captain during his senior season.

== Career statistics ==
			Regular season					Playoffs
Season	Team	League	GP	G	A	Pts	PIM	GP	G	A	Pts	PIM
1924–25	Yale	THL	—	—	—	—	—	—	—	—	—	—
1925–26	Yale	THL	—	—	—	—	—	—	—	—	—	—
1926–27	Yale	Independent	—	14	—	—	—	—	—	—	—	—

Note: assists were not an official statistic at the time.

== Head coaching record ==
Record table
Season	Team	Overall	Conference	Standing	Postseason
Yale Bulldogs Independent (1928–1930)
1928–29	Yale	15–1–1			East Intercollegiate Champion
1929–30	Yale	17–1–1			East Intercollegiate co-Champion
Yale:		32–2–2			
Total:		32–2–2			
National champion Postseason invitational champion Conference regular season champion Conference regular season and conference tournament champion Division regular season champion Division regular season and conference tournament champion Conference tournament champion
