= Winthrop Palmer =

American ice hockey player (1906–1970)

Medal record

Men's ice hockey

Representing United States

Olympic Games
Silver medal – second place	1932 Lake Placid	Team

World Championships
Gold medal – first place	1933 Prague	

Winthrop Hale "Ding" Palmer, Jr. (December 5, 1906 – February 4, 1970) was an American ice hockey player who competed in the 1932 Winter Olympics. He died in Warehouse Point, Connecticut.

== Early life ==
Born in Summit, New Jersey, Palmer graduated from Kent School in Kent, Connecticut in 1926 where he played on the team with fellow hockey Olympian Johnny Bent. Both Palmer and Bent also played hockey at Yale University prior to competing in the Olympics.

In 1932 he was a member of the Olympic American ice hockey team, which won the silver medal. He played all six matches and scored eight goals. He was also a member of the Massachusetts Rangers, the American team that won the 1933 World Ice Hockey Championships.

He was inducted into the United States Hockey Hall of Fame in 1973.

== Career statistics ==
			Regular season					Playoffs
Season	Team	League	GP	G	A	Pts	PIM	GP	G	A	Pts	PIM
1927–28	Yale	Independent	—	52	—	—	—	—	—	—	—	—
1928–29	Yale	Independent	—	8	2	10	—	—	—	—	—	—
1929–30	Yale	Independent	—	27	10	37	—	—	—	—	—	—
College totals			—	87	12	99	—	—	—	—	—	—

Note: Primary assists were only recorded infrequently.
