= Richard Vaughan (ice hockey) =

Biographical details
- Born: September 27, 1906; Rock, Wisconsin, US
- Died: June 14, 1987 (aged 80); Albuquerque, New Mexico, US

Playing career
- 1925–1928: Yale
- Position: Center/Right Wing

Coaching career (HC unless noted)
- 1929–1935: Yale (asst.)
- 1935–1943: Princeton
- 1946–1959: Princeton

Head coaching record
- Overall: 159–211–14

Richard Farries Vaughan (September 27, 1906 – June 14, 1987) was an American ice hockey player and head coach, best known for his long tenure at Princeton Tigers.

== Career ==
Vaughan played with the Yale Bulldogs university team for three seasons, serving as captain during his senior year. From 1929–1935 he was an assistant coach with the Yale Bulldogs.

Vaughan began coaching Princeton Tigers ice hockey team in 1935 and promptly raised the level of completion from a poor outing the previous year. The Tigers could not sustain the success and oscillated around the .500 mark for the next seven years. While the program was closed for two years during World War II, Vaughan was retained as head coach and resumed his work once the team returned to action in January 1946 (some sources list no coach for that abbreviated year). The post-war Tigers were not quite as good as their earlier iterations: Vaughan's squads hovered just below an even record for much of the time. He left in 1959 and was replaced by R. Norman Wood.

During the early part of his career, Vaughan published a book entitled Hockey which has since gone out of print.

== Personal life ==
Vaughan was the son of Baptist theologian Richard Miner Vaughan. His brother, Wayland, also attended Yale University, was a member of the ice hockey team and later coached at Boston University.

== Head coaching record ==
Vaughan's record as college head coach is:

Record table
Season	Team	Overall	Conference	Standing	Postseason
Princeton Tigers (Quadrangular League) (1935–1943)
1935–36	Princeton	13–8–1			
1936–37	Princeton	6–11–0			
1937–38	Princeton	5–12–1			
1938–39	Princeton	11–10–0			
1939–40	Princeton	9–7–3			
1940–41	Princeton	9–5–1			
1941–42	Princeton	10–6–0			
1942–43	Princeton	3–9–0			
Princeton:		66–68–6			
Princeton Tigers (Pentagonal League) (1946–1955)
1945–46	Princeton	1–3–0			
1946–47	Princeton	6–6–1			
1947–48	Princeton	10–11–0			
1948–49	Princeton	6–13–1			
1949–50	Princeton	6–13–1			
1950–51	Princeton	7–10–1			
1951–52	Princeton	8–7–0			
1952–53	Princeton	11–7–0			
1953–54	Princeton	4–12–2			
1954–55	Princeton	8–8–1			
Princeton Tigers Independent (1955–1957)
1955–56	Princeton	11–9–0			
1956–57	Princeton	2–17–0			
1957–58	Princeton	7–11–0			
1958–59	Princeton	6–16–1			
Princeton:		93–143–8			
Total:		159–211–14			
National champion Postseason invitational champion Conference regular season champion Conference regular season and conference tournament champion Division regular season champion Division regular season and conference tournament champion Conference tournament champion
