= Johnny Bent =

American ice hockey player

Medal record

Men's ice hockey

Representing the United States

Olympic Games
Silver medal – second place	1932 Lake Placid	Team competition

John Peale Bent (August 5, 1908 – June 5, 2004) was an American ice hockey player who competed in the 1932 Winter Olympics.

== Early life ==
Bent was born in Eagles Mere, Pennsylvania. He graduated from Kent School in Kent, Connecticut in 1926 where he played on the team with fellow hockey Olympian Winthrop Palmer. Both Bent and Palmer also played hockey at Yale University before competing in the Olympics.

In 1932 he was a member of the American ice hockey team, which won the silver medal. He played all six matches and scored three goals.

He died in Lake Forest, Illinois.
