= Franklin Farrell =

American ice hockey player

Medal record

Men's Ice hockey

Representing United States

Olympic Games
Silver medal – second place	1932 Lake Placid	Team competition

Franklin Tot Farrell III (March 23, 1908 – July 2, 2003) was an American ice hockey player who competed in the 1932 Winter Olympics.

He was born and died in New Haven, Connecticut.

In 1932 he was a member of the American ice hockey team, which won the silver medal. He played all six matches as goaltender.
