= Harvard–Yale hockey rivalry =

College sports rivalry

Harvard-Yale hockey rivalry
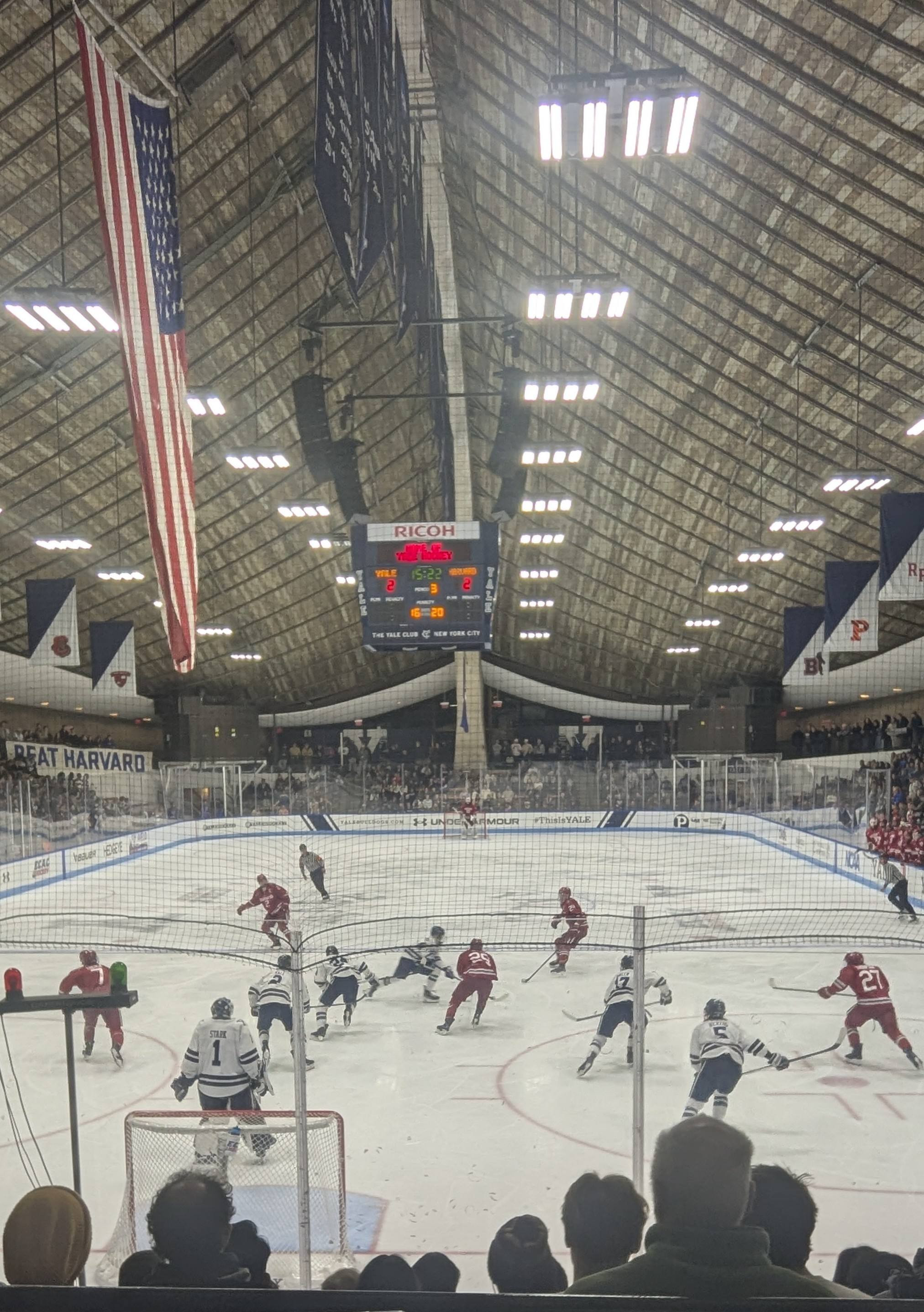
- 2025 game at Ingalls Rink

- Harvard Crimson Yale Bulldogs
- Sport: Ice hockey
- First meeting: Yale 5, Harvard 4 February 26, 1900
- Latest meeting: Harvard 4, Yale 3 February 28, 2025
- Next meeting: February 11, 2022
- Stadiums: Bright-Landry Hockey Center; Ingalls Rink

Statistics
- Total meetings: 271
- All-time series: Harvard leads, 154–92–23 (.615)
- Largest victory: Harvard 13, Yale 1 February 26, 1921
- Longest win streak: Harvard, 9 (February 1970 – February 1974)
- Longest unbeaten streak: Harvard, 11 (November 2018–present)
- Current win streak: Harvard, 8 (December 2021–present)
- Current unbeaten streak: Harvard, 11 (November 2018–present)

The Harvard–Yale hockey rivalry is a men's ice hockey sports rivalry between the Crimson of Harvard University and the Bulldogs of Yale University dating back to the 19th century.

Harvard and Yale play each other at least twice each season with most games at Harvard's Bright Hockey Center in Allston, Massachusetts and at Yale's Ingalls Rink in New Haven, Connecticut. Postseason meetings are common. Harvard and Yale have met more than 270 times on the ice with their first match coming on February 26, 1900.

== Game results ==
Harvard victories	Yale victories	Tie games

No.	Date	Location	Winner	Score	Notes
1	February 26, 1900	St. Nicholas Rink; New York, NY	Yale	5–4	
2	February 11, 1901	St. Nicholas Rink; New York, NY	Harvard	4–0	
3	February 11, 1902	St. Nicholas Rink; New York, NY	Yale	4–3	
4	March 14, 1902	St. Nicholas Rink; New York, NY	Yale	5–3	(Note: IHA Championship Game 1.)
5	March 17, 1902	St. Nicholas Rink; New York, NY	Yale	4–1	(Note: IHA Championship Game 2)
6	February 21, 1903	St. Nicholas Rink; New York, NY	Harvard	3–0	
7	February 27, 1903	St. Nicholas Rink; New York, NY	Harvard	6–2	
8	February 28, 1903	St. Nicholas Rink; New York, NY	Harvard	5–1	
9	February 22, 1904	St. Nicholas Rink; New York, NY	Harvard	5–2	(Note: Yale's 100th Game)
10	February 27, 1904	St. Nicholas Rink; New York, NY	Harvard	4–3	
11	February 18, 1905	St. Nicholas Rink; New York, NY	Harvard	7–1	
12	February 17, 1906	St. Nicholas Rink; New York, NY	Harvard	4–3	(a.e.t.)
13	February 16, 1907	St. Nicholas Rink; New York, NY	Harvard	3–2	
14	February 15, 1908	St. Nicholas Rink; New York, NY	Yale	3–2	
15	February 20, 1909	St. Nicholas Rink; New York, NY	Harvard	5–0	
16	February 19, 1910	St. Nicholas Rink; New York, NY	Harvard	3–0	
17	February 18, 1911	St. Nicholas Rink; New York, NY	Harvard	3–2	
18	February 17, 1912	Boston Arena; Boston, MA	Harvard	4–0	(Note: First game between Harvard and Yale played at a non-neutral site)
19	February 21, 1912	St. Nicholas Rink; New York, NY	Yale	3–2	
20	February 24, 1912	Boston Arena; Boston, MA	Harvard	4–2	
21	February 1, 1913	Boston Arena; Boston, MA	Harvard	4–0	
22	February 19, 1913	St. Nicholas Rink; New York, NY	Harvard	3–2	
23	February 6, 1914	Boston Arena; Boston, MA	Harvard	4–3	(a.e.t.)
24	February 11, 1914	Yale Arena; New Haven, CT	Yale	3–1	
25	February 28, 1914	Boston Arena; Boston, MA	Harvard	4–1	
26	January 30, 1915	Boston Arena; Boston, MA	Harvard	4–2	
27	February 23, 1915	New Haven Arena; New Haven, CT	Harvard	3–1	
28	February 12, 1916	Boston Arena, Boston, MA	Harvard	2–0	
29	February 26, 1916	New Haven Arena; New Haven, CT	Harvard	4–2	
30	February 17, 1917	New Haven Arena; New Haven, CT	Yale	2–0	
31	March 3, 1917	Boston Arena; Boston, MA	Harvard	5–0	
32	March 10, 1917	New Haven Arena; New Haven, CT	Yale	2–0	
33	February 8, 1919	Brooklyn Ice Palace; Brooklyn, NY	Harvard	4–1	
34	January 17, 1920	Pavilion Rink; Cambridge, MA	Harvard	5–4	(Note: The Pavilion Rink was used due to the Boston Arena being damaged by fire.)
35	February 21, 1920	Philadelphia Ice Palace; Philadelphia, PA	Harvard	3–0	(Note: Yale's home games were played in Philadelphia due to their rink being unplayable.)
36	February 05, 1921	Philadelphia Ice Palace; Philadelphia, PA	Harvard	7–0	
37	February 26, 1921	Boston Arena; Boston, MA	Harvard	13–1	
38	February 11, 1922	Boston Arena; Boston, MA	Harvard	6–2	
39	February 25, 1922	New Haven Arena; New Haven, CT	Harvard	3–1	
40	January 20, 1923	New Haven Arena; New Haven, CT	Harvard	3–2	(a.e.t.)
41	March 3, 1923	Boston Arena; Boston, MA	Yale	3–0	
42	March 7, 1923	New Haven Arena; New Haven, CT	Harvard	2–1	(a.e.t.)
43	February 9, 1924	Boston Arena; Boston, MA	Yale	3–0	
44	March 1, 1923	New Haven Arena; New Haven, CT	Yale	6–1	
45	January 17, 1925	Boston Arena; Boston, MA	Harvard	3–2	(a.e.t.)
46	February 11, 1925	Boston Arena; Boston, MA	Yale	3–2	
47	February 25, 1925	Boston Arena; Boston, MA	Yale	1–0	(a.e.t.)
48	February 13, 1926	Boston Arena; Boston, MA	Harvard	4–0	
49	February 27, 1926	Madison Square Garden; New York, NY	Harvard	2–0	(Note: Yale played all of their home games at Madison Square Garden in New York.)
50	February 19, 1927	Boston Arena; Boston, MA	Harvard	6–2	
51	February 26, 1927	New Haven Arena; New Haven, CT	Harvard	2–1	
52	February 25, 1928	New Haven Arena; New Haven, CT	Harvard	2–1	(a.e.t.)
53	March 3, 1928	Boston Arena; Boston, MA	Harvard	2–0	
54	March 2, 1929	Boston Garden; Boston, MA	Harvard	2–1	
55	March 9, 1929	New Haven Arena; New Haven, CT	Yale	1–0	
56	March 13, 1929	New Haven Arena; New Haven, CT	Yale	3–2	(a.e.t.)
57	March 1, 1930	New Haven Arena; New Haven, CT	Harvard	3–2	(a.e.t.)
58	March 8, 1930	Boston Garden; Boston, MA	Yale	3–1	(Note: Attendance was 15,000 fans.)
59	March 12, 1930	Boston Garden; Boston, MA	Tie	2–2	(a.e.t.)
60	February 28, 1931	Boston Garden; Boston, MA	Yale	5–1	
61	March 7, 1931	New Haven Arena; New Haven, CT	Yale	3–1	
62	February 27, 1932	New Haven, CT	Harvard	4–1	
63	March 5, 1932	Franklin Park, Boston, MA	Tie	1–1	(a.e.t.)
64	March 9, 1932	New Haven, CT	Tie	4–4	(a.e.t.)
65	February 25, 1933	New Haven, CT	Yale	4–1	
66	March 4, 1933	Franklin Park, Boston, MA	Harvard	4–1	
67	March 8, 1933	Franklin Park, Boston, MA	Harvard	4–3	(a.e.t.)
68	February 23, 1934	New Haven, CT	Harvard	6–2	
69	March 3, 1934	Franklin Park, Boston, MA	Yale	3–1	
70	March 7, 1934	New Haven, CT	Yale	5–4	(a.e.t.)
71	March 2, 1935	Franklin Park, Boston, MA	Yale	3–2	
72	March 9, 1935	New Haven, CT	Harvard	4–1	
73	March 13, 1935	Franklin Park, Boston, MA	Yale	3–2	
74	February 16, 1936	Franklin Park, Boston, MA	Harvard	5–2	
75	March 7, 1936	New Haven, CT	Harvard	11–0	
76	February 27, 1937	New Haven, CT	Harvard	8–5	
77	March 6, 1937	Franklin Park, Boston, MA	Harvard	5–0	
78	February 27, 1938	New Haven, CT	Harvard	5–4	
79	March 5, 1938	Franklin Park, Boston, MA	Yale	3–2	
80	March 10, 1938	New Haven, CT	Yale	2–1	(Note: Yale's 600th Game)
81	February 17, 1939	New Haven, CT	Tie	2–2	(a.e.t.)
82	March 4, 1939	Franklin Park, Boston, MA	Harvard	7–3	
83	March 2, 1940	Franklin Park, Boston, MA	Yale	4–2	
84	March 9, 1940	New Haven, CT	Yale	5–1	
85	March 1, 1941	New Haven, CT	Yale	8–2	
86	March 8, 1941	Franklin Park, Boston, MA	Yale	8–2	
87	February 28, 1942	Franklin Park, Boston, MA	Yale	4–2	
88	March 7, 1942	New Haven, CT	Yale	4–3	
89	February 27, 1943	New Haven, CT	Harvard	4–1	
90	March 6, 1943	Franklin Park, Boston, MA	Yale	4–2	
91	March 10, 1943	Franklin Park, Boston, MA	Harvard	5–3	
92	February 9, 1946	New Haven, CT	Yale	9–2	
93	March 1, 1947	Franklin Park, Boston, MA	Yale	6–4	
94	March 8, 1947	New Haven, CT	Yale	4–2	
95	March 6, 1948	New Haven, CT	Yale	4–3	
96	March 13, 1948	Franklin Park, Boston, MA	Harvard	1–0	
97	March 17, 1948	New Haven, CT	Yale	10–3	(Note: Harvard withdrew team from ice at 18:45 of third period after major brawl.)
98	March 5, 1949	Franklin Park, Boston, MA	Harvard	4–1	
99	March 12, 1949	New Haven, CT	Harvard	8–3	
100	March 4, 1950	New Haven, CT	Yale	4–1	
101	March 11, 1950	Franklin Park, Boston, MA	Harvard	2–1	
102	March 3, 1951	Franklin Park, Boston, MA	Harvard	4–0	
103	March 10, 1951	New Haven, CT	Yale	5–1	
104	March 1, 1952	New Haven, CT	Yale	4–3	
105	March 8, 1952	Franklin Park, Boston, MA	Yale	5–2	
106	February 28, 1953	Franklin Park, Boston, MA	Harvard	5–2	
107	March 7, 1953	New Haven, CT	Harvard	4–2	
108	February 27, 1954	New Haven, CT	Tie	3–3	(a.e.t.)
109	March 6, 1954	Franklin Park, Boston, MA	Tie	5–5	(a.e.t.)
110	February 26, 1955	Franklin Park, Boston, MA	Harvard	9–1	
111	March 5, 1955	New Haven, CT	Harvard	4–1	
112	March 5, 1956	New Haven, CT	Yale	1–0	
113	March 10, 1956	Franklin Park, Boston, MA	Harvard	2–0	
114	March 2, 1957	Donald C. Watson Rink, Allston, MA	Harvard	4–2	
115	March 9, 1957	New Haven, CT	Harvard	4–0	
116	March 1, 1958	New Haven, CT	Harvard	6–2	
117	March 8, 1958	Donald C. Watson Rink, Allston, MA	Harvard	6–0	
118	February 28, 1959	Donald C. Watson Rink, Allston, MA	Harvard	2–1	
119	March 7, 1959	Ingalls Rink, New Haven, CT	Tie	5–5	(a.e.t.)
120	February 27, 1960	Ingalls Rink, New Haven, CT	Harvard	5–0	
121	March 5, 1960	Donald C. Watson Rink, Allston, MA	Yale	3–2	
122	February 25, 1961	Donald C. Watson Rink, Allston, MA	Harvard	6–2	
123	March 4, 1961	Ingalls Rink, New Haven, CT	Tie	1–1	(a.e.t.)
124	February 24, 1962	Ingalls Rink, New Haven, CT	Harvard	2–1	
125	March 3, 1962	Donald C. Watson Rink, Allston, MA	Harvard	9–3	
126	February 23, 1963	Donald C. Watson Rink, Allston, MA	Harvard	6–5	
127	March 2, 1963	Ingalls Rink, New Haven, CT	Harvard	6–0	
128	February 29, 1964	Ingalls Rink, New Haven, CT	Harvard	12–2	
129	March 3, 1964	Boston Garden, Boston, MA	Harvard	3–2	
130	February 27, 1965	Donald C. Watson Rink, Allston, MA	Yale	4–3	
131	March 6, 1965	Ingalls Rink, New Haven, CT	Harvard	5–4	
132	January 1, 1966		Yale	3–2	(Note: Nichols School Tournament.)
133	February 26, 1966	Ingalls Rink, New Haven, CT	Yale	8–5	
134	March 5, 1966	Donald C. Watson Rink, Allston, MA	Yale	6–5	
135	February 25, 1967	Donald C. Watson Rink, Allston, MA	Harvard	7–3	
136	March 4, 1967	Ingalls Rink, New Haven, CT	Harvard	7–3	
137	February 24, 1968	Ingalls Rink, New Haven, CT	Harvard	7–1	
138	March 2, 1968	Donald C. Watson Rink, Allston, MA	Harvard	9–1	
139	February 22, 1969	Donald C. Watson Rink, Allston, MA	Harvard	7–2	
140	March 1, 1969	Ingalls Rink, New Haven, CT	Yale	3–2	(a.e.t.)
141	February 28, 1970	Ingalls Rink, New Haven, CT	Harvard	6–2	
142	March 7, 1970	Donald C. Watson Rink, Allston, MA	Harvard	9–0	
143	December 21, 1970	Madison Square Garden, New York, NY	Harvard	6–2	(Note: ECAC Holiday Festival.)
144	February 26, 1971	Donald C. Watson Rink, Allston, MA	Harvard	11–4	
145	March 6, 1971	Ingalls Rink, New Haven, CT	Harvard	11–2	
146	February 26, 1972	Ingalls Rink, New Haven, CT	Harvard	5–1	(Note: Yale's 1,300th game.)
147	March 4, 1972	Donald C. Watson Rink, Allston, MA	Harvard	8–4	
148	February 24, 1973	Donald C. Watson Rink, Allston, MA	Harvard	9–1	
149	March 3, 1973	Ingalls Rink, New Haven, CT	Harvard	2–1	
150	February 23, 1974	Ingalls Rink, New Haven, CT	Yale	6–1	
151	March 2, 1974	Donald C. Watson Rink, Allston, MA	Harvard	10–3	
152	December 28, 1974	Detroit Olympia Stadium, Detroit, MI	Harvard	8–3	(Note: Great Lakes Invitational.)
153	February 22, 1975	Donald C. Watson Rink, Allston, MA	Harvard	3–2	
154	March 1, 1975	Ingalls Rink, New Haven, CT	Harvard	7–2	
155	February 28, 1976	Ingalls Rink, New Haven, CT	Harvard	9–3	
156	March 6, 1976	Donald C. Watson Rink, Allston, MA	Harvard	7–2	
157	February 26, 1977	Donald C. Watson Rink, Allston, MA	Harvard	6–2	
158	March 5, 1977	Ingalls Rink, New Haven, CT	Harvard	5–3	
159	February 25, 1978	Ingalls Rink, New Haven, CT	Yale	3–2	
160	March 4, 1978	Donald C. Watson Rink, Allston, MA	Yale	4–3	
161	February 10, 1979	Walter Brown Arena, Boston, MA	Yale	4–1	
162	March 3, 1979	New Haven Coliseum, New Haven, CT	Yale	6–5	
163	February 23, 1980	New Haven Coliseum, New Haven, CT	Tie	6–6	(a.e.t.)
164	March 1, 1980	Bright-Landry Hockey Center, Allston, MA	Tie	4–4	(a.e.t.)
165	February 14, 1981	Bright-Landry Hockey Center, Allston, MA	Harvard	6–2	
166	February 21, 1981	Ingalls Rink, New Haven, CT	Tie	5–5	(a.e.t.)
167	February 6, 1982	Bright-Landry Hockey Center, Allston, MA	Tie	1–1	(a.e.t.)
168	February 20, 1982	Ingalls Rink, New Haven, CT	Yale	5–3	
169	February 5, 1983	New Haven Coliseum, New Haven, CT	Yale	5–0	
170	February 19, 1983	Bright-Landry Hockey Center, Allston, MA	Harvard	3–0	
171	February 4, 1984	Bright-Landry Hockey Center, Allston, MA	Harvard	2–1	
172	February 18, 1984	New Haven Coliseum, New Haven, CT	Tie	1–1	(a.e.t.)
173	November 17, 1984	Bright-Landry Hockey Center, Allston, MA	Harvard	3–1	
174	February 1, 1985	Ingalls Rink, New Haven, CT	Yale	6–2	
175	November 15, 1985	Ingalls Rink, New Haven, CT	Yale	7–5	(Note: Yale Coach Tim Taylor's 100th win.)
176	January 31, 1986	Bright-Landry Hockey Center, Allston, MA	Harvard	3–2	
177	March 15, 1986	Boston Garden, Boston, MA	Harvard	6–3	(Note: ECAC finals.)
178	November 15, 1986	Bright-Landry Hockey Center, Allston, MA	Harvard	4–1	
179	January 13, 1987	Ingalls Rink, New Haven, CT	Yale	4–2	
180	November 14, 1987	Ingalls Rink, New Haven, CT	Harvard	7–2	
181	January 17, 1988	Bright-Landry Hockey Center, Allston, MA	Harvard	8–1	
182	November 11, 1988	Bright-Landry Hockey Center, Allston, MA	Harvard	6–2	
183	January 31, 1989	Ingalls Rink, New Haven, CT	Yale	3–1	(Note: Harvard ranked No. 1 in the country.)
184	November 10, 1989	Ingalls Rink, New Haven, CT	Yale	6–2	
185	January 12, 1990	Bright-Landry Hockey Center, Allston, MA	Harvard	11–0	
186	November 10, 1990	Bright-Landry Hockey Center, Allston, MA	Harvard	7–1	
187	January 12, 1991	Ingalls Rink, New Haven, CT	Yale	5–2	
188	November 23, 1991	Bright-Landry Hockey Center, Allston, MA	Tie	2–2	(a.e.t.)
189	February 7, 1992	Ingalls Rink, New Haven, CT	Tie	5–5	(a.e.t.)
190	November 21, 1992	Ingalls Rink, New Haven, CT	Tie	5–5	(a.e.t.)
191	February 12, 1993	Bright-Landry Hockey Center, Allston, MA	Harvard	4–1	
192	November 12, 1993	Bright-Landry Hockey Center, Allston, MA	Harvard	4–0	
193	December 11, 1994	Ingalls Rink, New Haven, CT	Harvard	12–1	
194	November 11, 1994	Ingalls Rink, New Haven, CT	Yale	3–2	(Note: Yale coach Tim Taylor's 200th win.)
195	February 4, 1995	Bright-Landry Hockey Center, Allston, MA	Harvard	3–2	
196	November 17, 1995	Bright-Landry Hockey Center, Allston, MA	Harvard	5–2	
197	February 9, 1996	Ingalls Rink, New Haven, CT	Yale	6–5	(Note: Yale Coach Tim Taylor's 500th game.)
198	November 15, 1996	Ingalls Rink, New Haven, CT	Tie	2–2	(a.e.t.)
199	February 7, 1997	Bright-Landry Hockey Center, Allston, MA	Harvard	3–2	
200	November 15, 1997	Bright-Landry Hockey Center, Allston, MA	Yale	3–1	(Note: Yale's 2,000th Game)
201	February 14, 1998	Ingalls Rink, New Haven, CT	Yale	5–3	
202	March 21, 1998	Olympic Arena, Lake Placid, NY	Harvard	4–1	(Note: ECAC Third place Game)
203	November 21, 1998	Ingalls Rink, New Haven, CT	Yale	7–1	(Note: Yale Coach Tim Taylor's 100th Ivy League Win)
204	February 12, 1999	Bright-Landry Hockey Center, Allston, MA	Harvard	3–2	
205	January 7, 2000	Bright-Landry Hockey Center, Allston, MA	Harvard	3–2	
206	February 26, 2000	Ingalls Rink, New Haven, CT	Harvard	5–2	
207	January 13, 2001	Ingalls Rink, New Haven, CT	Yale	3–1	
208	March 2, 2001	Bright-Landry Hockey Center, Allston, MA	Harvard	6–4	
209	March 9, 2001	Bright-Landry Hockey Center, Allston, MA	Harvard	5–4	(Note: ECAC Quarterfinals)
210	March 10, 2001	Bright-Landry Hockey Center, Allston, MA	Harvard	7–4	
211	January 12, 2002	Bright-Landry Hockey Center, Allston, MA	Harvard	4–3	
212	March 1, 2002	Ingalls Rink, New Haven, CT	Yale	4–3	
213	December 7, 2002	Ingalls Rink, New Haven, CT	Harvard	6–3	
214	January 10, 2003	Bright-Landry Hockey Center, Allston, MA	Harvard	6–2	
215	November 15, 2003	Bright-Landry Hockey Center, Allston, MA	Harvard	4–1	
216	February 6, 2004	Ingalls Rink, New Haven, CT	Harvard	7–5	
217	November 12, 2004	Bright-Landry Hockey Center, Allston, MA	Harvard	3–1	
218	January 29, 2005	Ingalls Rink, New Haven, CT	Harvard	5–3	
219	November 18, 2005	Bright-Landry Hockey Center, Allston, MA	Harvard	4–3	(a.e.t.)
220	December 4, 2005	Ingalls Rink, New Haven, CT	Yale	4–3	(a.e.t.)
221	November 18, 2006	Bright-Landry Hockey Center, Allston, MA	Yale	5–2	
222	February 16, 2007	Ingalls Rink, New Haven, CT	Yale	5–1	
223	March 3, 2007	Bright-Landry Hockey Center, Allston, MA	Harvard	5–2	(Note: ECAC First Round)
224	March 4, 2007	Bright-Landry Hockey Center, Allston, MA	Harvard	2–1	
225	November 28, 2007	Ingalls Rink, New Haven, CT	Tie	3–3	(a.e.t.)
226	February 22, 2008	Bright-Landry Hockey Center, Allston, MA	Harvard	6–1	
227	January 10, 2009	Bright-Landry Hockey Center, Allston, MA	Yale	6–2	
228	February 6, 2009	Ingalls Rink, New Haven, CT	Yale	5–1	
229	January 12, 2010	Bright-Landry Hockey Center, Allston, MA	Harvard	3–2	
230	February 6, 2010	Ingalls Rink, New Haven, CT	Yale	6–3	
231	January 8, 2011	Bright-Landry Hockey Center, Allston, MA	Yale	4–2	
232	February 4, 2011	Ingalls Rink, New Haven, CT	Yale	1–0	
233	January 27, 2012	Bright-Landry Hockey Center, Allston, MA	Harvard	4–3	
234	February 18, 2012	Ingalls Rink, New Haven, CT	Yale	7–1	
235	March 9, 2012	Bright-Landry Hockey Center, Allston, MA	Yale	2–1	(a.e.t.)
236	March 10, 2012	Bright-Landry Hockey Center, Allston, MA	Harvard	4–3	(a.e.t.)
237	March 11, 2012	Bright-Landry Hockey Center, Allston, MA	Harvard	8–2	
238	November 3, 2012	Bright-Landry Hockey Center, Allston, MA	Yale	5–1	
239	January 18, 2013	Ingalls Rink, New Haven, CT	Yale	4–0	
240	December 7, 2013	Ingalls Rink, New Haven, CT	Tie	2–2	(a.e.t.)
241	January 11, 2014	Madison Square Garden, New York, NY	Yale	5–1	(Note: Rivalry on Ice.)
242	February 21, 2014	Bright-Landry Hockey Center, Allston, MA	Yale	5–2	
243	March 7, 2014	Ingalls Rink, New Haven, CT	Yale	4–0	
244	March 8, 2014	Ingalls Rink, New Haven, CT	Yale	2–1	
245	November 15, 2014	Bright-Landry Hockey Center, Allston, MA	Yale	2–1	
246	January 10, 2015	Madison Square Garden, New York, NY	Yale	4–1	
247	February 6, 2015	Ingalls Rink, New Haven, CT	Yale	3–0	
248	March 13, 2015	Ingalls Rink, New Haven, CT	Harvard	3–2	
249	March 14, 2015	Ingalls Rink, New Haven, CT	Yale	2–0	
250	March 15, 2015	Ingalls Rink, New Haven, CT	Harvard	3–2	(a.e.t.)
251	November 6, 2015	Bright-Landry Hockey Center, Allston, MA	Tie	2–2	(a.e.t.)
252	February 6, 2016	Ingalls Rink, New Haven, CT	Yale	2–1	
253	January 21, 2017	Bright-Landry Hockey Center, Allston, MA	Tie	1–1	
254	February 17, 2017	Ingalls Rink, New Haven, CT	Harvard	4–2	
255	March 10, 2017	Bright-Landry Hockey Center, Allston, MA	Harvard	6–4	
256	March 11, 2017	Bright-Landry Hockey Center, Allston, MA	Harvard	4–3	
257	November 3, 2017	Bright-Landry Hockey Center, Allston, MA	Yale	5–2	
258	February 24, 2018	Ingalls Rink, New Haven, CT	Yale	2–1	
259	November 9, 2018	Ingalls Rink, New Haven, CT	Tie	3–3	(a.e.t.)
260	February 23, 2019	Bright-Landry Hockey Center, Allston, MA	Harvard	3–0	
261	November 16, 2019	Ingalls Rink, New Haven, CT	Harvard	6–1	
262	January 11, 2020	Madison Square Garden, New York, NY	Harvard	7–0	
263	February 14, 2020	Bright-Landry Hockey Center, Allston, MA	Tie	4–4	(a.e.t.)
264	December 4, 2021	Ingalls Rink, New Haven, CT	Harvard	5–3	
265	February 11, 2022	Bright-Landry Hockey Center, Allston, MA	Harvard	2–0	
266	November 5, 2022	Bright-Landry Hockey Center, Allston, MA	Harvard	4–0	
267	January 20, 2023	Ingalls Rink, New Haven, CT	Harvard	3–2	(a.e.t.)
268	January 13, 2024	Ingalls Rink, New Haven, CT	Harvard	1–0	
269	March 1, 2024	Bright-Landry Hockey Center, Allston, MA	Harvard	2–1	
270	January 11, 2025	Bright-Landry Hockey Center, Allston, MA	Harvard	3–1	
271	February 28, 2025	Ingalls Rink, New Haven, CT	Harvard	4–3	(a.e.t.)
Series: Harvard leads 156–92–23

As of 31 October 2024

== Series facts ==
Statistic	Harvard	Yale
Games played	271	
Wins	156	92
Home wins	80	51
Road wins	53	28
Neutral site wins	21	13
Most goals scored in a game by one team	13 (1921)	10 (1948)
Most goals in a game by both teams	15 (1971 – Harvard 11, Yale 4)	
Fewest goals in a game by both teams	1 (1925, 1929, 1948, 1956, 2011)	
Fewest goals scored in a game by one team in a win	1 (1948)	1 (1925, 1929, 1956, 2011)
Most goals scored in a game by one team in a loss	5 (1937, 1963, 2004)	5 (1966, 1979, 1985, 1996)
Largest margin of victory	13 (1921)	7 (1948)
Smallest margin of victory	1 (1948)	1 (1925, 1929, 1956, 2011)
Longest winning streak	9 (February 1970 – February 1974)	7 (January 2014 – March 2015)
Longest unbeaten streak	11 (November 2018–present)	10 (November 2012 – March 2015)

== See also ==
- College rivalry
- Harvard Crimson
- Yale Bulldogs
