= New Haven Arena =

Defunct American indoor ice hockey arena

- Interactive map of New Haven Arena
- Location: New Haven, Connecticut, US
- Coordinates: 41°18′31″N 72°55′13.5″W
- Capacity: 4,000

Construction
- Opened: 1914, 1927 (reopened)
- Closed: 1924, 1972
- Demolished: 1974

Tenants
- New Haven Eagles (AHL) (1936–1952); New Haven Blades (EHL) (1952–1972); New Haven Elms (EPBL) (1965–1966); Yale hockey (NCAA)) (1914–1917, 1927–1959)

New Haven Arena was an indoor arena on Grove Street in New Haven, Connecticut, that served as a venue for ice hockey and concerts.

The first arena opened in 1914 but burned down in 1924. The new arena was started but went bankrupt; it was bought by Abraham Podoloff and his sons Nathan and Maurice and completed in 1927. It held over 4,000 people.

The Arena hosted the American Hockey League's New Haven Eagles from 1936 to 1952, the New Haven Blades of the Eastern Hockey League from 1954 to 1972, the New Haven Elms of the Eastern Professional Basketball League in 1965 and 1966, and Yale Hockey from 1914 to 1917 (at the first Arena) and from 1927 to 1959. The Rolling Stones, the Kinks, Bob Dylan, The Doors, Joan Baez, The Supremes, The Temptations, Cream and many music icons of the 1960s held concerts at the Arena.

In 1965, Ronald Reagan future president of the United States, delivered the "Myth of the Great Society" speech at the arena.

Perhaps one of the most famous incidents in the Arena's history occurred on December 9, 1967 when Jim Morrison, front man for the rock group The Doors, was arrested on stage during a performance, making him the first rock star to be taken into custody during a performance.

When the New Haven Coliseum was completed in 1972, most of the Arena's business went there. The Arena was demolished in 1974. The site is now the headquarters of the New Haven Division of the Federal Bureau of Investigation.

== See also ==
- New Haven Coliseum – Sports and entertainment arena in Connecticut, U.S.
- Professional ice hockey in Connecticut – History of ice hockey in Connecticut
