= 1928–29 Middlebury Panthers men's ice hockey season =

- Conference: Independent
- Home ice: Middlebury Rink

Record
- Overall: 7–3–0
- Home: 3–0–0
- Road: 4–3–0

Coaches and captains
- Head coach: Roy Clogston
- Captain: Stillman Kelley

The 1928–29 Middlebury Panthers men's ice hockey season was the 7th season of play for the program. The Panthers coached by Roy Clogston in his 1st season.

== Season ==
After being led by the team captain for each of the past four years, Middlebury finally brought in a full-time head coach for its ice hockey team. However, Roy Clogston was met with the same impediment that had hamstrung the team in many of those years: a lack of available ice. Warm weather forced the team to use nearby porter pond for training in December but it also caused three of the first four scheduled games to be cancelled. Fortunately, Brown had access to an indoor rink, allowing the Panthers to open the season in Rhode Island. Unfortunately, the team was missing several of its starters; even excluding the loss of three regulars to graduation, Chappell, Douglas and MacLeod were back at home recovering from the flu while Gruggel and Huntington limped around the ice nursing injuries. With only Still Kelley at full capacity, the team was shadow of itself and had yet to have any kind of practice time. Despite everything arrayed against them, Middlebury fought hard and had the match deadlocked at 3-all after two periods. However, the lack of reserves caught up with the team in the third period and when Brown got its second wind the Panthers were unable to keep up. The Bears racked up 4 scores in the final period, turning the close affair into a rout.

By the following week some of the team had recovered from their various ailments, however, Huntington had come down with pneumonia while MacLeod had developed pleurisy. Both players were likely out for the rest of the season while others such as Jason and Crocker (cold) would only be laid up for a short while. The team had to find replacements for the missing players which led to several new additions to the roster. Since the next match was at home, many appeared against Norwich since they did not have to worry about the price of a train ticket. With Douglas back in goal, Foote was able to pair with Gruggel on defense and form a formidable trio. Two member of the football team, Guarnaccia and Schmidt, were used as reserves on defense to give the group some recovery time. The visitors were stopped cold by Middlebury with Douglas stopping all 16 shots that got to the net. Kelley, meanwhile, provided all of the offense for the Panthers and chalked up a hat-trick for the clubs first win of the season. Continued poor weather ended any chance of another game in January and the team had to wait until after the exam break for their next match.

The extended time off was bit of a blessing, however, as it gave the players time to get back into game shape. While the Panthers were still short on practice, all but Huntington were physically ready to go when the next game was played. Additionally, because they had passed their first exams, three freshmen were added to the lineup and it was hoped that they would help the team continued its success in recent years. The team set out on the road for a three-game trip and began well. The rematch with Norwich was even better than the first with Middlebury completely dominating the Cadets. Kelley recorded another hat-trick and was joined on the scoresheet by Crocker and Melbye. Two days later the team headed west to meet Clarkson with the Golden Knights looking for revenge. Middlebury had been the only blemish on Clarkson's schedule the previous season, ruining a potential championship team for the New Yorkers. The match was played at night under floodlights but the Panthers may as well have been playing in the dark. The team suffered the worst defeat in their history, surrendering 13 goals to the home squad despite the omnipresent snowfall. It was only a single marker from Kelley that prevented a shutout but there was no doubt about which team was superior. The team recovered for their match the following night with St. Lawrence and the defense put up an impressive display. Douglas was required to make only 2 saves for the entire game while Kelley and Makela tallied for the visitors.

Middlebury returned to prepare for the next match with Vermont which could decide the state championship. In a game that was altered by a small-than-normal rink and an accumulation of snow on the surface, The Panthers' defense was key in their victory. On the few occasions when the offense was able to push the puck through the drifts, the Catamount netminder did his best to steal the show with save after spectacular save. Middlebury fired more than 70 shots on goal to just 9 for the home team, thanks to the stalwart play of Foote and Nelson. The game's only goal came with just 2 minutes to play when Kelley notched his tenth on the season. The team then returned home and prepared for their first ever meeting with St. Stephen's. The game was bogged down on account of soft ice but that didn't stop Makela from opening the scoring before three minutes had elapsed. Kelley followed suit at the 10-minute mark but that was the last goal that would come for either side. The periods were shorted to 17-minutes due to the poor quality of the ice and the match witnessed just 22 shots combined on the evening.

The final week of the hockey season began with a trip to face Princeton. The Tigers were one of the top teams in the nation, having handed Clarkson its only loss on the year, and were a daunting challenge for the undersized Panthers. Middlebury got off to a poor start in the game and found themselves down by 4 goals after the first. They recovered from the disastrous start and played Princeton mostly even for the remainder of the game Foote recorded his first goal of the season in the lopsided loss. On their way back, the Panthers stopped off for a match with Williams and were met by a far better fate. In a game that had been delayed for a month, Nelson and Kelley scored to match the efforts of the home team and force extra time. Kelley's second goal 2 minutes in ended up as the winning tally and ensured that the Panthers would finish the year with a winning record. The final game of the year was a rematch with Vermont that saw the Panthers prove themselves as the best college team in Vermont for the fourth consecutive season. Makela recorded his first career hat-trick in the 5–0 win which saw Douglas set a program record with his sixth shutout, doing so in just nine games.

Russell D. Brown served as team manager with Edward R. Allen as his assistant.

== Roster ==
No.	Nat.	Player	Class	Pos	Height	Weight	DoB	Hometown	Previous team
	(United States)	Philip E. Brewer	Sophomore	D			1909-05-10	Hartford, Connecticut
	(United States)	Ronald P. Burrows	Senior	LW			1907-06-11	St. Johnsbury, Vermont
	(United States)	Howard W. Chappell	Sophomore	LW				Clinton, New York
	(United States)	Walton T. Crocker	Sophomore	LW/RW			1909-05-06	Reading, Massachusetts
	(United States)	Gordon L. Douglas	Senior	G			1907-11-06	Flushing, New York
	(United States)	George E. Foote	Sophomore	G/D/F				Boston, Massachusetts
	(United States)	Folke Gruggel	Senior	D			1908-02-28	Beechhurst, New York
	(United States)	Samuel Guarnaccia	Junior	D			1908-10-01	Wakefield, Massachusetts
	(United States)	Theodore T. Huntington	Junior	D				New Rochelle, New York
	(United States)	Otis R. Jason	Senior	LW			1908-02-09	Cohasset, Massachusetts
	(United States)	Stillman F. Kelley II (C)	Senior	C			1906-06-03	Lexington, Massachusetts
	(United States)	Urho A. Makela	Freshman	LW			1909-12-02	Peabody, Massachusetts
	(United States)	Robert P. McLeod	Junior	LW/RW			1908-03-28	Natick, Massachusetts
	(United States)	Arnold T. Melbye	Freshman	C/LW				Wellesley Hills, Massachusetts
	(United States)	Walter J. Nelson	Freshman	D			1907-04-26	Boston, Massachusetts
	(United States)	Russell S. Schmidt	Senior	D			1908-10-01	Hastings-on-Hudson, New York
	(United States)	Henry M. Weston	Senior	LW			1907-10-20	Alameda, California

== Standings ==
1928–29 Eastern Collegiate ice hockey standings
	Intercollegiate							Overall					
	GP	W	L	T	Pct.	GF	GA	GP	W	L	T	GF	GA
Amherst	8	3	4	1	.438	13	18	9	3	5	1	14	20
Army	9	2	7	0	.222	11	50	12	3	9	0	23	61
Bates	11	4	6	1	.409	26	20	12	5	6	1	28	21
Boston College	10	4	6	0	.400	29	27	14	5	9	0	36	42
Boston University	10	9	1	0	.900	36	9	12	9	2	1	39	14
Bowdoin	9	5	4	0	.556	11	14	9	5	4	0	11	14
Brown	–	–	–	–	–	–	–	13	8	5	0	–	–
Clarkson	7	6	1	0	.857	43	11	10	9	1	0	60	19
Colby	5	0	4	1	.100	4	11	5	0	4	1	4	11
Colgate	7	4	3	0	.571	16	18	7	4	3	0	16	18
Connecticut Agricultural	–	–	–	–	–	–	–	–	–	–	–	–	–
Cornell	5	2	3	0	.400	7	9	5	2	3	0	7	9
Dartmouth	–	–	–	–	–	–	–	17	9	5	3	58	28
Hamilton	–	–	–	–	–	–	–	10	4	6	0	–	–
Harvard	7	4	3	0	.571	26	10	10	5	4	1	31	15
Massachusetts Agricultural	11	6	5	0	.545	30	20	12	7	5	0	33	21
Middlebury	10	7	3	0	.700	27	29	10	7	3	0	27	29
MIT	11	5	6	0	.455	26	32	11	5	6	0	26	32
New Hampshire	11	6	4	1	.591	23	20	11	6	4	1	23	20
Norwich	–	–	–	–	–	–	–	8	2	6	0	–	–
Pennsylvania	11	2	9	0	.182	12	82	13	2	10	1	–	–
Princeton	–	–	–	–	–	–	–	19	15	3	1	–	–
Rensselaer	–	–	–	–	–	–	–	4	1	3	0	–	–
St. John's	–	–	–	–	–	–	–	7	3	3	1	–	–
St. Lawrence	–	–	–	–	–	–	–	8	3	4	1	–	–
St. Stephen's	–	–	–	–	–	–	–	–	–	–	–	–	–
Syracuse	–	–	–	–	–	–	–	–	–	–	–	–	–
Union	5	2	2	1	.500	17	14	5	2	2	1	17	14
Vermont	–	–	–	–	–	–	–	–	–	–	–	–	–
Williams	10	6	4	0	.600	33	16	10	6	4	0	33	16
Yale	12	10	1	1	.875	47	9	17	15	1	1	64	12

== Schedule and results ==
Date	Opponent	Site	Decision	Result	Record
Regular Season
January 11	at Brown*	Rhode Island Auditorium • Providence, Rhode Island	Foote	L 3–7	0–1–0
January 16	Norwich*	Middlebury Rink • Middlebury, Vermont	Douglas	W 3–0	1–1–0
February 6	at Norwich*	Northfield, Vermont	Douglas	W 5–0	2–1–0
February 8	at Clarkson*	Ives Park • Potsdam, New York	Douglas	L 1–13	2–2–0
February 9	at St. Lawrence*	Weeks Field Rink • Canton, New York	Douglas	W 2–0	3–2–0
February 13	at Vermont*	Centennial Rink • Burlington, Vermont	Douglas	W 1–0	4–2–0
February 16	St. Stephen's*	Middlebury Rink • Middlebury, Vermont	Douglas	W 2–0	5–2–0
February 19	at Princeton*	Hobey Baker Memorial Rink • Princeton, New Jersey	Douglas	L 2–7	5–3–0
February 20	at Williams*	Sage Hall Rink • Williamstown, Massachusetts	Douglas	W 3–2 ^{OT}	6–3–0
February 23	Vermont*	Middlebury Rink • Middlebury, Vermont	Douglas	W 5–0	7–3–0
*Non-conference game.

== Scoring statistics ==
Name	Position	Games	Goals
Still Kelley	C	10	15
Urho Makela	RW	8	5
Walt Crocker	LW/RW	10	2
Ted Huntington	D	1	1
Barney Gruggle	D	8	1
Red Melbye	C/LW	8	1
Duke Nelson	D	8	1
George Foote	G/D/LW	10	1
Ron Burrows	LW	1	0
Dut Schmidt	D	1	0
Phil Brewer	D	2	0
Hen Weston	LW	2	0
Sammy Guarnaccia	D	3	0
Shorty Jason	LW	3	0
Bob McLeod	LW/RW	5	0
Pat Chappell	LW	6	0
Gordon Douglas	G	9	0
Total			27

Note: primary assists were an official statistic, however, they were only occasionally reported.

== Goaltending statistics ==
Name	Games	Minutes	Wins	Losses	Ties	Goals Against	Saves	Shut Outs	SV %	GAA
Gordon Douglas	9	526	7	2	0	22		6		2.51
George Foote	1	60	0	1	0	7		0		7.00
Total	10	586	7	3	0	29		6		2.97

Note: goals against average is based upon a 60-minute regulation game.
