= 1928–29 Clarkson Golden Knights men's ice hockey season =

Intercollegiate hockey season

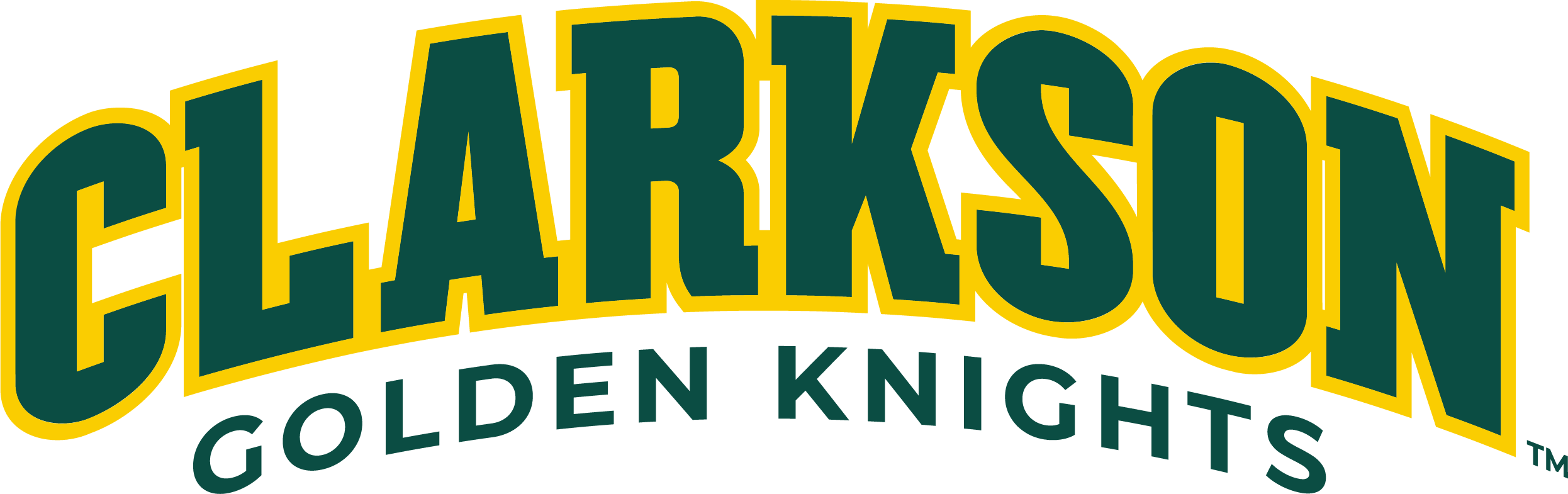
- Home ice: Ives Park

Record
- Overall: 9–1–0
- Home: 6–0–0
- Road: 3–1–0

Coaches and captains
- Head coach: Gordon Croskery
- Captain: Fred Dion

The 1928–29 Clarkson Golden Knights men's ice hockey season was the 9th season of play for the program. The team was coached by Gordon Croskery in his 6th season.

== Season ==
Clarkson entered its ninth season having already established itself as one of the top programs in the East. Despite the departure of its two defensive stalwarts, The Golden Knights were looking to try and finish the year undefeated, having missed that mark by just one game in back-to-back campaigns. From the start of the season, the team looked like they had a chance to do just that when they easily won a game over visiting Victoria College. The game saw the debut of three new players, with 'Ike' Houston leading the team in scoring. The match also saw the appearance of an 8-foot wooden fence around the Ives Park rink. The palisade was put in place so that spectators would have to pay an entry fee to watch the game.

The performance in the second game was just as dominating for Tech as the team brushed Vermont aside 9–0. The only thing that marred the game was a snow flurry that caused the final period to be cut down to 15 minutes. For their third game of the season, Clarkson travelled to Canton and met St. Lawrence without the services of three players. Donald, Houston and Williams were unable to participate because they were freshmen (Clarkson and St. Lawrence belonged to the same athletic conference which did not allow freshmen to play on varsity teams) and the shorthanded Knights had a fight on their hands as a result. The missing offensive punch caused Tech to be held back by the Larries' defense early, enabling the home team to score first. All-American captain Fred Dion scored twice before the end of the first but the offense continued to fall short afterwards. St. Lawrence tied the game in the second and the already-bitter rivals held one another scoreless for most of the third. Near the end of the game, Johnny Burke slipped through the defense and netted the game-winner, keeping Clarkson's record spotless.

Next, Clarkson went south to New Jersey to take on Princeton in a rematch of last year's 8–5 classic. With the ice in rough shape, the Tigers weren't about to take Tech lightly and put forth a stout performance. Princeton held the Clarkson offense at bay and built a 3–0 lead by the early part of the second period. Tech finally got their shots to go in afterwards, cutting the lead to just 1 by the start of the third, but the Tigers closed out the game strong and won 3–5. The Knights didn't have much time to lick their wounds as they returned home and faced an equally stiff challenge from Queen's. Leading up to the game the weather seemed to be accommodating, remaining cold and dry most of the week. Unfortunately, on game day the thermostat rose and sleet showered the ice, turning the match into a slog. To top it off, near-gale-force winds swept the rink during the game and hampered both teams abilities and opportunities. While Clarkson eked out a 1–0 victory, calls for an enclosed rink were renewed as a team befitting Clarkson's talent shouldn't have to put up with such circumstances.

In February, Clarkson faced Dartmouth, which entered the game with a 6–2–2 record and had suffered defeats only against Yale. Although Dartmouth was generally considered the stronger team, Clarkson controlled much of the play in front of a large crowd at Ives Park. Benefiting from favorable ice conditions, Clarkson outperformed Dartmouth in skating, shooting, and physical play. The victory was regarded as one of the most significant in the program's early history and demonstrated Clarkson's ability to compete with established collegiate hockey programs.

The momentum was carried over into the next three games and Clarkson rolled over its collegiate competition by a combined score of 24–4. In Late February the team concluded its season against the Nichols Club of Buffalo. The game was loose defensively and Clarkson allowed 6 goals to Nichols, however, they were also able to fire six shots into the net. For the overtime, the two teams had agreed to play two 5-minute periods and Clarkson was dominant in both, scoring three times while the play became increasingly physical. While the team's historical records includes a further game, contemporary accounts have Nichols being the final match. After the year, Fred Dion, who had switched from center to defense at the start of the season, was named to the (unofficial) All-American squad for a second straight year.

== Roster ==
No.	Nat.	Player	Class	Pos	Height	Weight	DoB	Hometown	Previous team
	(United States)	Charles Beneke	Sophomore	D				Liverpool, New York
	(Canada)	John Burke	Sophomore	F				London, Ontario
		John Cox	Senior
		John Cutting	Junior	F
	(Canada)	Alfred Dion (C)	Senior	F/D				Ottawa, Ontario
	(Canada)	C. Gordon Donald	Freshman	F				Carleton Place, Ontario
	(Canada)	Wallace Easton	Sophomore	G				Renfrew, Ontario
	(Canada)	Wilbur Guest	Sophomore	D				Renfrew, Ontario
	(Canada)	W. Harrison Heintzman	Junior	F				Arnprior, Ontario
	(Canada)	Clarence Houston	Freshman	F				Arnprior, Ontario
	(Canada)	Carol Williams	Freshman	F				Carleton Place, Ontario

== Standings ==
1928–29 Eastern Collegiate ice hockey standings
	Intercollegiate							Overall					
	GP	W	L	T	Pct.	GF	GA	GP	W	L	T	GF	GA
Amherst	8	3	4	1	.438	13	18	9	3	5	1	14	20
Army	9	2	7	0	.222	11	50	12	3	9	0	23	61
Bates	11	4	6	1	.409	26	20	12	5	6	1	28	21
Boston College	10	4	6	0	.400	29	27	14	5	9	0	36	42
Boston University	10	9	1	0	.900	36	9	12	9	2	1	39	14
Bowdoin	9	5	4	0	.556	11	14	9	5	4	0	11	14
Brown	–	–	–	–	–	–	–	13	8	5	0	–	–
Clarkson	7	6	1	0	.857	43	11	10	9	1	0	60	19
Colby	5	0	4	1	.100	4	11	5	0	4	1	4	11
Colgate	7	4	3	0	.571	16	18	7	4	3	0	16	18
Connecticut Agricultural	–	–	–	–	–	–	–	–	–	–	–	–	–
Cornell	5	2	3	0	.400	7	9	5	2	3	0	7	9
Dartmouth	–	–	–	–	–	–	–	17	9	5	3	58	28
Hamilton	–	–	–	–	–	–	–	10	4	6	0	–	–
Harvard	7	4	3	0	.571	26	10	10	5	4	1	31	15
Massachusetts Agricultural	11	6	5	0	.545	30	20	12	7	5	0	33	21
Middlebury	10	7	3	0	.700	27	29	10	7	3	0	27	29
MIT	11	5	6	0	.455	26	32	11	5	6	0	26	32
New Hampshire	11	6	4	1	.591	23	20	11	6	4	1	23	20
Norwich	–	–	–	–	–	–	–	8	2	6	0	–	–
Pennsylvania	11	2	9	0	.182	12	82	13	2	10	1	–	–
Princeton	–	–	–	–	–	–	–	19	15	3	1	–	–
Rensselaer	–	–	–	–	–	–	–	4	1	3	0	–	–
St. John's	–	–	–	–	–	–	–	7	3	3	1	–	–
St. Lawrence	–	–	–	–	–	–	–	8	3	4	1	–	–
St. Stephen's	–	–	–	–	–	–	–	–	–	–	–	–	–
Syracuse	–	–	–	–	–	–	–	–	–	–	–	–	–
Union	5	2	2	1	.500	17	14	5	2	2	1	17	14
Vermont	–	–	–	–	–	–	–	–	–	–	–	–	–
Williams	10	6	4	0	.600	33	16	10	6	4	0	33	16
Yale	12	10	1	1	.875	47	9	17	15	1	1	64	12

== Schedule and results ==
Date	Opponent	Site	Result	Record
Regular season
January 7	Victoria*	Ives Park • Potsdam, New York	W 7–2	1–0–0
January 11 ^{†}	Vermont*	Ives Park • Potsdam, New York	W 9–0	2–0–0
January 15	at St. Lawrence*	Weeks Field Rink • Canton, New York	W 3–2	3–0–0
January 19	at Princeton*	Hobey Baker Memorial Rink • Princeton, New Jersey	L 3–5	3–1–0
January 25	Queen's*	Ives Park • Potsdam, New York	W 1–0	4–1–0
February 4	Dartmouth*	Ives Park • Potsdam, New York	W 4–1	5–1–0
February 8	Middlebury*	Ives Park • Potsdam, New York	W 13–1	6–1–0
February 13	St. Lawrence*	Ives Park • Potsdam, New York	W 6–0	7–1–0
February 16	at Cornell*	Beebe Lake • Ithaca, New York	W 5–2	8–1–0
February 19	vs. Nichols Club*	Peace Bridge Arena • Fort Erie, Ontario	W 9–6 ^{2OT}	9–1–0
*Non-conference game.

Note: The dates for some games differ from what is listed in Clarkson's historical record. Additionally, two games are listed by Clarkson's records but do not appear to have been played.
