= 1928–29 Bates Bobcats men's ice hockey season =

Intercollegiate hockey season

- Conference: Independent
- Home ice: Bartlett Street Rink

Record
- Overall: 5–6–1
- Home: 2–4–1
- Road: 3–2–0

Coaches and captains
- Head coach: Carleton Wiggin
- Captain: Cecil Pooler

The 1928–29 Bates men's ice hockey season was the 10th season of play for the program.

== Season ==
At the start of the season, the program received some very unwelcome news. Carleton Wiggin, who had led the Bobcats for the previous 6 seasons and won 3 state championships, was being released from his position as athletics coach. While 'Wig" had gotten good records with the ice hockey team and solid if unspectacular results from the baseball squad, he was less effective as the coach of the football team. Under his watch, Bates had never had a winning season on the gridiron and had just finished a winless campaign, going 0–7. Even with the lack of success on the field, Wiggin was still a popular figure on campus, having also been a 4-sport star as an undergraduate. While the college could have kept him on staff in some capacity, the administration decided to have one man coach the baseball, hockey and football teams and announced that Dave Morey would take over at the start of the following school year. Wiggin was allowed to finish out the year as the coach of the hockey team and the players did their best to rally around their coach.

The team got as much practice in before the first game as possible but still appeared disorganized against the Brunswick Canadians. Johnny Cogan was about the only player of the 15 used in the match who appeared ready to play and he ended up scoring both of the team's goals in the win. The Garnet then opened their state series against Bowdoin a few days later and looked much more prepared despite having several days off. Cogan led off the scoring but the Bobcats were unable to build on the early lead. Bowdoin tied the game in the second and, despite having several scoring opportunities, Bates was unable to regain the lead. The game required overtime and ended up being a bit slow in the first extra session before breaking out in the second. Cogan, who had been injured in the third period, led the offense for Bates but it was Bowdoin who managed to net the game-winner.

The next game came versus Colby and resulted in a very rough match. 14 penalties were called in the contest, which included fighting majors to both Maher and Lovett, but it was the sensational play of Irvine that stole the show. The Mules' netminder made 35 saves in the match and kept Colby in the game despite being outplayed throughout. The loss of Secor to a shoulder injury hamstrung the offense though Cogan was still able to score a pair of goals. After 2 scoreless overtime periods the match was declared a draw. A rematch with Bowdoin came a few days later with the score being identical to the first go-round. Cogan, again, provided the only goal for the Bobcats who had reordered their forward line to try and improve the offense. Anderson, a new entry for the team, played at right wing while Johnson was moved over to the left side. Secor, who still nursing his injury, had been dropped back to defense but none of those changes seemed to work.

Bates took its annual trip south the following week and came back with mixed results. Even with Zeke Secor's injury, the offense finally woke up against Army and Johnson's hat-trick led the team to a 5–0 demolition of the Cadets. Hopes that the team had turned the corner were dashed in the next game when the Garnet failed to get a single goal against the Mass Aggies. The team could only manage 11 shots in the game and ended up squandering another strong performance from first-year starter Topolosky and the defense.

A return match with the Aggies ended up being the wildest game of the season. Cogan opened the scoring for Bates but the team was quickly buried under an avalanche of Aggie goals. down 1–4 at the start of the second, the Bobcats came roaring back with two goals from Johnson in the second and a trio of Cogan marker in the third. Having to devote their entire game to offense, Bates allowed two more scored and ended regulation ted at 6-all. UMass pulled ahead at the start of overtime and Bates was unable to get another tying goal, losing in heartbreaking fashion. The team then met Colby for an exhibition match but the game devolved into more of a street brawl. The referees allowed the overly-rough play to continue to a point that coach Wiggin could no longer abide. After leaving the ice for intermission, the Bobcats refused to return to the ice and the Mules were declared winners by default. Inconsistent goal scoring continued to plague Bates and the team was shutout by New Hampshire a few days later. Cogan and Johnson were visible throughout the game but were unable to crack the UNH defense. In an unfortunate turn of events, however, Cogan accidentally flipped the puck into his own cage while trying to clear the puck away and was credited with the winning goal.

The exam break paused the season afterwards and when the Bobcats reconvened they welcomed in several new players from the freshman team. Secor, now recovered enough to return to the team, was in fine form as was new entry McCluskey. Those two wingers combined with Cogan to completely dominate the game and lead the Bobcats to victory. The team was without Cogan in their meeting with MIT during the winter carnival but Farrell, who had taken over in goal from Topolosky after the exams, was a star in goal and kept the team in the game. With the team's newfound superiority and Cogan back in the lineup, the Bobcats downed Colby a few days later to take second place in the intrastate standings.

The final game of the season came against New Hampshire in a rematch. The Bobcats headed down to Durham and showed out far better than they had in the first meeting. McCluskey became the team's new star forward and led the way with a pair of goals as Bates ended the season on a high note.

Howard Knight served as team manager.

== Roster ==
No.	Nat.	Player	Class	Pos	Height	Weight	DoB	Hometown	Previous team
	(United States)	H. Charles Anderson	Junior	LW/RW			1909-09-14	Randolph, Maine
	(United States)	John B. Cogan	Junior	C			1908-08-06	Stoneham, Massachusetts
	(United States)	Eloi R. Daigle	Senior				1904-08-11	Fort Kent, Maine
	(United States)	Sydney W. Farrell	Freshman	G			1907-10-23
		Earl H. Garcelon	Junior
		George H. Johnson Jr.	Senior	LW/RW
	(United States)	Maurice J. Lane	Senior				1906-07-13	Lewiston, Maine
	(United States)	Pierce M. Maher Jr.	Senior	D			1906-01-30	New Haven, Connecticut
		Francis P. Malia	Senior	D/LW
	(United States)	Ray E. McCluskey	Freshman	RW			1910-10-05	Houlton, Maine
	(United States)	Joseph F. Murphy Jr.	Freshman				1906-09-12	Watertown, Massachusetts
	(United States)	Cecil F. Pooler (C)	Senior	D			1908-09-27	Brewer, Maine
	(United States)	Morris H. Secor	Junior	D/LW			1908-07-19	Belmont, Massachusetts
	(United States)	Joseph B. Topolosky	Senior	G			1908-02-27	Woodland, Maine

== Standings ==
1928–29 Eastern Collegiate ice hockey standings
	Intercollegiate							Overall					
	GP	W	L	T	Pct.	GF	GA	GP	W	L	T	GF	GA
Amherst	8	3	4	1	.438	13	18	9	3	5	1	14	20
Army	9	2	7	0	.222	11	50	12	3	9	0	23	61
Bates	11	4	6	1	.409	26	20	12	5	6	1	28	21
Boston College	10	4	6	0	.400	29	27	14	5	9	0	36	42
Boston University	10	9	1	0	.900	36	9	12	9	2	1	39	14
Bowdoin	9	5	4	0	.556	11	14	9	5	4	0	11	14
Brown	–	–	–	–	–	–	–	13	8	5	0	–	–
Clarkson	7	6	1	0	.857	43	11	10	9	1	0	60	19
Colby	5	0	4	1	.100	4	11	5	0	4	1	4	11
Colgate	7	4	3	0	.571	16	18	7	4	3	0	16	18
Connecticut Agricultural	–	–	–	–	–	–	–	–	–	–	–	–	–
Cornell	5	2	3	0	.400	7	9	5	2	3	0	7	9
Dartmouth	–	–	–	–	–	–	–	17	9	5	3	58	28
Hamilton	–	–	–	–	–	–	–	10	4	6	0	–	–
Harvard	7	4	3	0	.571	26	10	10	5	4	1	31	15
Massachusetts Agricultural	11	6	5	0	.545	30	20	12	7	5	0	33	21
Middlebury	10	7	3	0	.700	27	29	10	7	3	0	27	29
MIT	11	5	6	0	.455	26	32	11	5	6	0	26	32
New Hampshire	11	6	4	1	.591	23	20	11	6	4	1	23	20
Norwich	–	–	–	–	–	–	–	8	2	6	0	–	–
Pennsylvania	11	2	9	0	.182	12	82	13	2	10	1	–	–
Princeton	–	–	–	–	–	–	–	19	15	3	1	–	–
Rensselaer	–	–	–	–	–	–	–	4	1	3	0	–	–
St. John's	–	–	–	–	–	–	–	7	3	3	1	–	–
St. Lawrence	–	–	–	–	–	–	–	8	3	4	1	–	–
St. Stephen's	–	–	–	–	–	–	–	–	–	–	–	–	–
Syracuse	–	–	–	–	–	–	–	–	–	–	–	–	–
Union	5	2	2	1	.500	17	14	5	2	2	1	17	14
Vermont	–	–	–	–	–	–	–	–	–	–	–	–	–
Williams	10	6	4	0	.600	33	16	10	6	4	0	33	16
Yale	12	10	1	1	.875	47	9	17	15	1	1	64	12

== Schedule and results ==
Date	Opponent	Site	Result	Record
Regular Season
January 2	Brunswick Canadians*	Bartlett Street Rink • Lewiston, Maine	W 2–1	1–0–0
January 5	Bowdoin*	Bartlett Street Rink • Lewiston, Maine	L 1–2 ^{2OT}	1–1–0
January 12	Colby*	Bartlett Street Rink • Lewiston, Maine	T 2–2 ^{2OT}	1–1–1
January 16	at Bowdoin*	Delta Rink • Brunswick, Maine	L 1–2	1–2–1
January 19	at Army*	Stuart Rink • West Point, New York	W 5–0	2–2–1
January 21	at Massachusetts Agricultural*	Alumni Field Rink • Amherst, Massachusetts	L 0–1	2–3–1
January 25	Massachusetts Agricultural*	Bartlett Street Rink • Lewiston, Maine	L 6–7 ^{OT}	2–4–1
January 29	New Hampshire*	Bartlett Street Rink • Lewiston, Maine	L 0–1	2–5–1
February 13	Bowdoin*	Bartlett Street Rink • Lewiston, Maine	W 3–0	3–5–1
February 15	Colby*	Bartlett Street Rink • Lewiston, Maine (exhibition)	T 1–1 ^{forfeit}	
February 16	MIT*	Bartlett Street Rink • Lewiston, Maine	L 2–3	3–6–1
February 20	at Colby*	South End Arena • Waterville, Maine	W 3–1	4–6–1
February 23	at New Hampshire*	UNH Ice Rink • Durham, New Hampshire	W 3–1	5–6–1
*Non-conference game.

== Scoring statistics ==
Name	Position	Games	Goals
Johnny Cogan	C	-	15 ^{†}
Jerry Johnson	LW/RW	-	5
Ray McCluskey	LW/RW	-	3
Pooch Pooler	D	-	2
Pierce Maher	D	-	1
Pat Malia	D	-	1
Joe Murphy	Substitute	-	1
Zeke Secor	D/LW	-	1
Charlie Anderson	LW/RW	-	0
Eloi Daigle	Substitute	-	0
Sid Farrell	G	-	0
Earl Garcelon	Substitute	-	0
Tossy Lane	Substitute	-	0
Joe Topolosky	G	-	0
Total			29

† Cogan was credited with the goal scored by New Hampshire on January 29.
Note: Assists were infrequently recorded during the season.
