= 1928–29 MIT Engineers men's ice hockey season =

- Conference: Independent
- Home ice: Boston Arena

Record
- Overall: 5–6–0
- Home: 1–0–0
- Road: 4–3–0
- Neutral: 0–3–0

Coaches and captains
- Head coach: Bill Stewart
- Captain: George White

The 1928–29 MIT Engineers men's ice hockey season was the 28th season of play for the program. The Engineers were coached by Bill Stewart in his 4th season.

== Season ==
With many returning players from the previous season, MIT had a decent outlook on the year and got into action with an exhibition match in early December. The extra workout was designed to get the team into shape for its opening match with Boston University since the team had not been able to get onto the ice until late November. Despite being favored in the match, the Engineers' offense failed and weren't able to get a single goal against the Terriers. The defense performed well but couldn't stop the team from opening the year with a loss. The team had little time to address their problems as their annual tilt with Harvard was just four days away. Sure enough, Tech was overwhelmed by the Crimson. While Riley allowed 9 goals, Crosby was able to finally get one for the Engineers.

After the inauspicious start, coach Stewart had five days to get his team prepared for Norwich and changed up the forward unit. Team captain George White was moved to wing with Crosby assuming his old position at center. Cullinan was shifted up from defense to the other wing with Peene now serving as a reserve. Hazeltine took over the vacant position on the blueline next to Lucey. Those changes, combined with a weaker opponent, led MIT to its first win of the season in spectacular fashion. Crosby led the way with two goals and an assist and had the game so well in hand by the third period that Stewart was able to finish out the game with alternates, substituting nearly the entire team. The team headed into the winter break with their spirits high and hadn't lost any of that moxie upon their return. Their first road game of the year saw MIT score another 5 goals, leading to a win over New Hampshire. The team had only two alternated for the match but both got in on the scoring. Peene assisted on Hall's opening goal and the latter added a second on an individual play in the second. The team built a 5–0 lead after two periods and were content to play defense for the remainder of the match. UNH managed a late goal but that only prevented Riley from earning a second consecutive shutout.

Unfortunately, due to the heavy demand for ice time at the Boston Arena, the Engineers didn't have another game on their schedule until February. With nearly a month off, the team did what it could to stay in shape and continued their winning streak when they met Army for their second road game. Just as they had in the New Hampshire game, MIT used a strong second period to establish a solid lead before playing defense in the final 20 minutes. All 5 goals came from different players with Ford and Lucey joining in on the exploits of the starting forwards. 10 days later, the team's streak came to an abrupt end when they met Princeton. The Tigers were on a 12-game heater heading into the match and continued their stellar play by overpowering the Engineers. Even with a solid defensive performance Princeton still managed to get 7 goals past Riley and skated away with a relatively easy win.

MIT was able to shake off the loss during their trip north into Maine. The team first defeated Bowdoin 1–0 with the score being close only due to the inspired play of the Bears' netminder. The following evening, the team met Bates during the Bobcat's winter carnival and the two were neck-and-neck throughout the 2 hour match. Lucey and Crosby each gave MIT a lead but their hosts were able to tie the match soon afterwards. In the waning moments of the game, Hall scored the winning marker, stunning the home crowd. Due to their late return from the trip, the rematch with BU was delayed to the 21st but Tech's offense fared no better than the first game and the team lost 1–3.

The final two game of the year came in early March on a southerly road trip. Using a bus rather than the typical train, the team was able to send their entire 16-man team which included Cullinan, who had been injured during the BU match. When the game began, however, the Brunos leapt out to an early lead, scoring three goals before the Engineers knew what hit them. The defense recovered after that initial salvo but the offense remained silent until the third. White and Crosby cut into the lead in the final frame but the Engineer rally ran out of time and MIT fell by a single goal. The following night, the team was in Philadelphia, facing a Penn squad that hadn't won any of its 11 games to that point. Despite the recent result, MIT got off to a slow start once more but the offense took less time to make an appearance. Hall and Deyermond scored to give the team a 2–1 lead in the second. Their advantage didn't last long as the Quakers tied the match in the middle frame before retaking the lead in the third. Nothing that MIT sent towards the cage got past the Penn goalie and his spectacular play ended MIT's season with a loss.

Laurence Horan served as team manager with.

== Roster ==
No.	Nat.	Player	Class	Pos	Height	Weight	DoB	Hometown	Previous team
	(United States)	Ralph H. Crosby	Senior	C/LW			1906-11-05	Somerville, Massachusetts
	(United States)	William E. Cullinan Jr.	Senior	D/RW			1907-08-17	Cambridge, Massachusetts
	(Canada)	Albert B. Deyarmond	Sophomore				1909-02-26	Nova Scotia
	(United States)	Paul F. Donahue	Senior	D			1907-04-02	Roslindale, Massachusetts
	(United States)	John J. Fahey	Senior	RW			1906-08-14	Derby, Connecticut
		Horace S. Ford Jr.	Sophomore	C			1909-04-06
	(United States)	W. L. Penn-Gaskell Hall	Sophomore	LW/RW			1908-09-08	Philadelphia, Pennsylvania
		Benjamin P. Hazeltine III	Sophomore	D
	(United States)	Laurence A. Horan	Senior	D			1905-07-01	Boston, Massachusetts
	(United States)	Daniel V. Lucey	Junior	D			1907-07-23	Melrose, Massachusetts
	(United States)	Francis M. Mead	Senior	RW			1906-10-23	Belmont, Massachusetts
		Charles B. Pear Jr.	Sophomore
	(Canada)	David D. Peene	Senior	RW			1903-01-20	Hamilton, Ontario
	(United States)	Philip J. Riley	Junior	G			1906-01-08	Lawrence, Massachusetts
	(United States)	George E. White (C)	Senior	C/LW			1906-11-13	Quincy, Massachusetts

== Standings ==
1928–29 Eastern Collegiate ice hockey standings
	Intercollegiate							Overall					
	GP	W	L	T	Pct.	GF	GA	GP	W	L	T	GF	GA
Amherst	8	3	4	1	.438	13	18	9	3	5	1	14	20
Army	9	2	7	0	.222	11	50	12	3	9	0	23	61
Bates	11	4	6	1	.409	26	20	12	5	6	1	28	21
Boston College	10	4	6	0	.400	29	27	14	5	9	0	36	42
Boston University	10	9	1	0	.900	36	9	12	9	2	1	39	14
Bowdoin	9	5	4	0	.556	11	14	9	5	4	0	11	14
Brown	–	–	–	–	–	–	–	13	8	5	0	–	–
Clarkson	7	6	1	0	.857	43	11	10	9	1	0	60	19
Colby	5	0	4	1	.100	4	11	5	0	4	1	4	11
Colgate	7	4	3	0	.571	16	18	7	4	3	0	16	18
Connecticut Agricultural	–	–	–	–	–	–	–	–	–	–	–	–	–
Cornell	5	2	3	0	.400	7	9	5	2	3	0	7	9
Dartmouth	–	–	–	–	–	–	–	17	9	5	3	58	28
Hamilton	–	–	–	–	–	–	–	10	4	6	0	–	–
Harvard	7	4	3	0	.571	26	10	10	5	4	1	31	15
Massachusetts Agricultural	11	6	5	0	.545	30	20	12	7	5	0	33	21
Middlebury	10	7	3	0	.700	27	29	10	7	3	0	27	29
MIT	11	5	6	0	.455	26	32	11	5	6	0	26	32
New Hampshire	11	6	4	1	.591	23	20	11	6	4	1	23	20
Norwich	–	–	–	–	–	–	–	8	2	6	0	–	–
Pennsylvania	11	2	9	0	.182	12	82	13	2	10	1	–	–
Princeton	–	–	–	–	–	–	–	19	15	3	1	–	–
Rensselaer	–	–	–	–	–	–	–	4	1	3	0	–	–
St. John's	–	–	–	–	–	–	–	7	3	3	1	–	–
St. Lawrence	–	–	–	–	–	–	–	8	3	4	1	–	–
St. Stephen's	–	–	–	–	–	–	–	–	–	–	–	–	–
Syracuse	–	–	–	–	–	–	–	–	–	–	–	–	–
Union	5	2	2	1	.500	17	14	5	2	2	1	17	14
Vermont	–	–	–	–	–	–	–	–	–	–	–	–	–
Williams	10	6	4	0	.600	33	16	10	6	4	0	33	16
Yale	12	10	1	1	.875	47	9	17	15	1	1	64	12

== Schedule and results ==
Date	Opponent	Site	Result	Record
Regular Season
December 8	vs. Boston University*	Boston Arena • Boston, Massachusetts	L 0–2	0–1–0
December 12	vs. Harvard*	Boston Arena • Boston, Massachusetts	L 1–9	0–2–0
December 17	Norwich*	Boston Arena • Boston, Massachusetts	W 5–0	1–2–0
January 5	at New Hampshire*	UNH Ice Rink • Durham, New Hampshire	W 5–1	2–2–0
February 2	at Army*	Stuart Rink • West Point, New York	W 5–2	3–2–0
February 12	at Princeton*	Hobey Baker Memorial Rink • Princeton, New Jersey	L 1–7	3–3–0
February 15	at Bowdoin*	Delta Rink • Brunswick, Maine	W 1–0	4–3–0
February 16	at Bates*	Bartlett Street Rink • Lewiston, Maine	W 3–2	5–3–0
February 21	vs. Boston University*	Boston Arena • Boston, Massachusetts	L 1–3	5–4–0
March 2	at Brown*	Rhode Island Auditorium • Providence, Rhode Island	L 2–3	5–5–0
March 3	at Pennsylvania*	Philadelphia Ice Palace • Philadelphia, Pennsylvania	L 2–3	5–6–0
*Non-conference game.
