= 1928–29 Bowdoin Polar Bears men's ice hockey season =

Men's ice hockey

- Conference: Independent
- Home ice: Delta Rink

Record
- Overall: 5–4–0
- Home: 3–1–0
- Road: 2–3–0

Coaches and captains
- Head coach: Ben Houser
- Captain: Tubby Howland

The 1928–29 Bowdoin Polar Bears men's ice hockey season was the 10th season of play for the program.

== Season ==
As the players were getting ready for the first meeting in November, a slate of 11 games was put together for the Polar Bears. The weather in recent years had not been kind to the program as many games had to be cancelled, however, every scheduled match gave the team a chance to play even if a contest were postponed to a later date. With that in mind, seven games were set to take place in January and while that was typically a poor month for ice conditions, the relatively open schedule in February could absorb some of those game if necessary. An unexpected problem for the team was captain-elect Preston Rice had not returned to campus after the summer break and Bowdoin would need to pick a new leader for the team. Fortunately, Coach Houser had plenty men to pick from as 40 candidates showed up for the first practice with five lettermen returning. Due to a lack of ice, the team was forced to use whatever was at their disposal including a partially-frozen Harpswell Pond. Nothing, however, could help the team as much as a full on-ice practice.

Despite the problems, the team opened the season with a win, pulling away from Bates after two overtime periods. The Bobcats opened the scoring early but were unable to build on their lead thanks to the stellar goaltending of Tubby Howland. Tiemer tied the game midway through the second and the score remained unchanged until the end of regulation. After a fast first overtime, the game slowed down in the second 5-minute session but Bob Thayer had enough left in the tank to net the winning goal. The team headed south to see if it had improved since the previous year but ended up losing a third consecutive game to Boston University by a 3-goal margin. The lack of practice was the biggest culprit in Bowdoin's loss, as the team had only been able to hold practice on three occasions, but the Polar Bears still gave the Terriers a fight. The following night the team faced New Hampshire and coach Houser flipped the wingers to see if that could spark some offense. The plan didn't work and Bowdoin was shutout by the Wildcats. The Bears' defense was displayed prominently in the match but an ineffective attack saw the team unable to capitalize on their scoring chances.

Bowdoin returned home to fine that the weather had been kind and gave them a perfect sheet of ice for the rematch with Bates. Tiemer got the team off to a fast start with 2 goals in 6 seconds through the Garner were able to cut into the lead before the end of the first period. From then on the game took on a physical tone and both teams tried to batter the other into submission. Interspersed between mad dashes up the ice, the players threw their bodies at one another. Though they were sometimes called for penalties, neither team could find the net for the remainder of the contest and Bowdoin was ale to put itself into prime position for another state championship. A subsequent game with Colby saw the Bowdoin earn at least a share of the title with Tiemer's second 2-goal performance headlining the victory. Just before the exam break, the team got a match in with Massachusetts Agricultural and continued its strong defense play. Not only did Bowdoin hold the Aggies to a single goal but both defensemen scored in the match, the final coming from Stone in the waning moments of the third period.

The Polar Bears returned from the exam break by electing Howland as team captain. The team also welcomed in Don Sloan but the starting lineup remained unchanged. In the final match with Colby, the defense was its usual stout force and stopped many a rush from Colby. Unfortunately, the offense was typical as well with Tiemer being the only player to score in the first two periods. This allowed a quick shot from the Mules to tie the score 5 minutes into the third, however, Dwyer's first goal of the season with just 75 seconds left gave Bowdoin the win. The victory guaranteed a state championship for Bowdoin as they had twice beaten their in-state opponents but there was still one game left to play. The following night Bates arrived in town but, with little to play for, coach Houser decided to use a mostly reserve lineup to give the seconds some ice time. The result was a win for Bates but that didn't materially change anything for the Bears.

With a championship in their back pocket, the Bears welcomed MIT to the delta that weekend. While neither team was particularly good on offense, the goaltenders performed remarkably with both stopping more than 20 shots in the match. The puck got by Captain Howland just once but that was enough for the Engineers to take the game. Due to warm weather the final two games were cancelled but that didn't dampen one of the most successful seasons that Bowdoin had yet produced.

Carl Moses served as team manager.

== Roster ==
No.	Nat.	Player	Class	Pos	Height	Weight	DoB	Hometown	Previous team
	(United States)	Paul S. Andrews	Senior				1907-01-19	Clinton, Maine
	(United States)	Basil S. Dwyer	Sophomore	LW/RW			1910-04-08	Hebron, Maine
	(United States)	Winslow R. Howland (C)	Senior	G			1906-07-17	Framingham, Massachusetts
	(United States)	James M. Parker	Junior	LW/RW			1908-03-31	Portland, Maine
	(United States)	Herbert H. Rose	Sophomore	LW/RW			1909-09-20	Machias, Maine
	(United States)	Donald D. Sloan	Freshman	C			1911-11-11	Lynn, Massachusetts
	(United States)	George H. Souther	Sophomore				1907-08-26	Boston, Massachusetts
	(United States)	Stuart R. Stone	Junior	D			1906-08-27	Newton, Massachusetts
	(United States)	Harry B. Thayer Jr.	Junior	D			1907-11-08	Boston, Massachusetts
	(United States)	Wendell Ward	Senior	C/LW/RW			1907-07-30	Houlton, Maine

== Standings ==
1928–29 Eastern Collegiate ice hockey standings
	Intercollegiate							Overall					
	GP	W	L	T	Pct.	GF	GA	GP	W	L	T	GF	GA
Amherst	8	3	4	1	.438	13	18	9	3	5	1	14	20
Army	9	2	7	0	.222	11	50	12	3	9	0	23	61
Bates	11	4	6	1	.409	26	20	12	5	6	1	28	21
Boston College	10	4	6	0	.400	29	27	14	5	9	0	36	42
Boston University	10	9	1	0	.900	36	9	12	9	2	1	39	14
Bowdoin	9	5	4	0	.556	11	14	9	5	4	0	11	14
Brown	–	–	–	–	–	–	–	13	8	5	0	–	–
Clarkson	7	6	1	0	.857	43	11	10	9	1	0	60	19
Colby	5	0	4	1	.100	4	11	5	0	4	1	4	11
Colgate	7	4	3	0	.571	16	18	7	4	3	0	16	18
Connecticut Agricultural	–	–	–	–	–	–	–	–	–	–	–	–	–
Cornell	5	2	3	0	.400	7	9	5	2	3	0	7	9
Dartmouth	–	–	–	–	–	–	–	17	9	5	3	58	28
Hamilton	–	–	–	–	–	–	–	10	4	6	0	–	–
Harvard	7	4	3	0	.571	26	10	10	5	4	1	31	15
Massachusetts Agricultural	11	6	5	0	.545	30	20	12	7	5	0	33	21
Middlebury	10	7	3	0	.700	27	29	10	7	3	0	27	29
MIT	11	5	6	0	.455	26	32	11	5	6	0	26	32
New Hampshire	11	6	4	1	.591	23	20	11	6	4	1	23	20
Norwich	–	–	–	–	–	–	–	8	2	6	0	–	–
Pennsylvania	11	2	9	0	.182	12	82	13	2	10	1	–	–
Princeton	–	–	–	–	–	–	–	19	15	3	1	–	–
Rensselaer	–	–	–	–	–	–	–	4	1	3	0	–	–
St. John's	–	–	–	–	–	–	–	7	3	3	1	–	–
St. Lawrence	–	–	–	–	–	–	–	8	3	4	1	–	–
St. Stephen's	–	–	–	–	–	–	–	–	–	–	–	–	–
Syracuse	–	–	–	–	–	–	–	–	–	–	–	–	–
Union	5	2	2	1	.500	17	14	5	2	2	1	17	14
Vermont	–	–	–	–	–	–	–	–	–	–	–	–	–
Williams	10	6	4	0	.600	33	16	10	6	4	0	33	16
Yale	12	10	1	1	.875	47	9	17	15	1	1	64	12

== Schedule and results ==
Date	Opponent	Site	Result	Record
Regular Season
January 5	at Bates*	Bartlett Street Rink • Lewiston, Maine	W 2–1 ^{2OT}	1–0–0
January 11	at Boston University*	Boston Arena • Boston, Massachusetts	L 1–4	1–1–0
January 12	at New Hampshire*	UNH Ice Rink • Durham, New Hampshire	L 0–2	1–2–0
January 16	Bates*	Delta Rink • Brunswick, Maine	W 2–1	2–2–0
January 21	at Colby*	Waterville Club Rink • Waterville, Maine	W 2–0	3–2–0
January 26	Massachusetts Agricultural*	Delta Rink • Brunswick, Maine	W 2–1	4–2–0
February 12	Colby*	Delta Rink • Brunswick, Maine	W 2–1	5–2–0
February 13	at Bates*	Bartlett Street Rink • Lewiston, Maine	L 0–3	5–3–0
February 15	MIT*	Delta Rink • Brunswick, Maine	L 0–1	5–4–0
*Non-conference game.

Note: The game against BU was played with three 20-minute periods. All other games were played with 15-minute periods.

== Scoring statistics ==
Name	Position	Games	Goals	Assists	Points
Paul Tiemer	C	9	7	0	7
Sonny Dwyer	LW/RW	9	1	2	3
Bob Thayer	D	9	2	0	2
Stuart Stone	D	9	1	0	1
Paul Andrews	Substitute	1	0	0	0
George Souther	Substitute	1	0	0	0
Don Sloan	C	3	0	0	0
Tubby Howland	G	9	0	0	0
Jim Parker	LW/RW	9	0	0	0
Herbert Rose	LW/RW	7	0	0	0
Wendell Ward	C/LW/RW	9	0	0	0
Total			11	2	13

Note: assists were recorded infrequently.

== Goaltending statistics ==
Name	Games	Minutes	Wins	Losses	Ties	Goals Against	Saves	Shut Outs	SV %	GAA
Tubby Howland	9	430	5	4	0	14		1		1.47
Total	9	430	5	4	0	14		1		1.47

Note: goals against average is based upon a 45-minute regulation game.
