= 1928–29 Colgate men's ice hockey season =

- Conference: Independent
- Home ice: Freshman Football Rink

Record
- Overall: 4–3–0
- Home: 2–1–0
- Road: 2–2–0

Coaches and captains
- Head coach: Raymond A. Watkins
- Assistant coaches: J. Howard Starr
- Captain: Albert Chambers

The 1928–29 Colgate men's ice hockey season was the 6th season of play for the program. The team was coached by Raymond A. Watkins in his 1st season.

== Season ==
After experiencing a great deal of trouble with their home rink in 1928, the school decided to build a new temporary rink. Aside from the improvements in drainage the new rink measured in at 190' by 85'. After work had begun, the school announced that Raymond A. Watkins, who had recently been hired to coach the freshman teams at the school, agree to helm the ice hockey program. While Watkins had not played the game previously, he had coached the team at Bates a few years earlier and would be assisted by J. Howard Starr who had been on the ice hockey team at YMCA College.

The team began practicing on Taylor Lake while they waited for the weather to cool off. Due in part to the poor experience the year before, the team did not bother to schedule any intercollegiate games until February. In the meantime, however, the Maroons received a welcome cold snap in the first half of January that allowed the team to get some on-ice practice. The club played an exhibition match against an amateur club from Clinton in mid-January and lost 3–4. The team played terribly in the first period, allowing three goals against in a span of just 3 minutes, but they soon found their skating legs and made a game of it for the rest of the contest. Unfortunately, due to inclement weather, the team was unable to continue its exhibition calendar and had to cancel the rest of their January matches.

Colgate faced a trial by fire at the opening of their season and ended up getting burned by Dartmouth. Hampered by a lack of practice time leading into the match, the Maroons were overwhelmed by one of the top teams in college hockey. The offense was unable to keep pace with the fast Indian skaters. The Green were in control for the entire game and hardly let Colgate out of its own end. Only a goal from Hofheins in the second prevented the team from being shutout. Three days later the team went on the road to play Cornell. The defense had a much stronger performance in the second game, however, the offense was still lacking. Howe's lone goal was insufficient to keep in the game on slow, soft ice.

A week later the team was in Schenectady to take on Union and had a near-identical performance to the Cornell game. After allowing the opening goal, Howe tied the game in the second but, with the rest of the team unable to score, the Maroons lost again. At this point, Colgate had lost 11 consecutive games and had not been in the win column since 1921. Just as it appeared that the team might be staring down at another winless season, the Maroons completely turned their season against Army. The two teams matched one another closely in the first period but, once the second began, everything tilted in Colgate's favor. Three goals followed in the second and the avalanche kept coming with a further 4 in the third. Hofheins led the way with a hat-trick and lifted the Marrons to victory.

The Maroons carried their newfound confidence into the next game with St. Lawrence and won an overtime match thanks to the exploits of Howe and Hofheins. The end of the week saw Cornell arrive for the rematch and fought a pitched battle with the Big Red. Chambers allowed the opening goal of the game but refused entry to every shot thereafter. Hofheins tied the score before too long and set up a mildly controversial call from referee. After a pile-up in front of the Cornell net, Earnie Paul disentangled the jumble of players only to find the puck in the cage. Nelson was credited with the goal and the Colgate defense managed to hold on to their lead until the end of the match.

Colgate was suddenly sitting in a position to finish the year with a winning record and had just Hamilton left to contend with. The defense played a stout game throughout the match, turning aside chance after chance from the Continentals. Spelder and Barnes were instrumental in keeping the scoresheet empty and sending the match into overtime. A penalty by Spelder gave Hamilton a chance in the extra session but Chambers kept the puck out of the goal and enabled Hofheins to score with just over a minute left. The win gave Colgate its first winning season in over a decade.

Paul Wish served as team manager.

Note: Colgate's athletic teams did not have a moniker until 'Red Raiders' was adopted in 1932.

== Roster ==
No.	Nat.	Player	Class	Pos	Height	Weight	DoB	Hometown	Previous team
	(United States)	Clifton W. Anderson	Junior					Greenwich, Connecticut
	(United States)	Warren F. Barnes	Junior	D				Winchester, Massachusetts
	(United States)	Albert M. Chambers	Senior	G				Kew Gardens, New York
	(United States)	Howard B. Crane	Freshman					Mamaroneck, New York
	(United States)	Willard G. Fischer	Freshman	C				Buffalo, New York
	(United States)	Robert F. Hofheins	Sophomore	LW				Buffalo, New York
	(United States)	Francis W. Howe	Junior	C				Buffalo, New York
	(United States)	James A. Nelson	Sophomore	RW				Sea Cliff, New York
	(United States)	Samuel B. Noyes	Sophomore					Niagara Falls, New York
	(United States)	Arthur Schiebel	Freshman					Mount Vernon, New York
	(United States)	John M. Spelder	Senior	D				Buffalo, New York
	(United States)	Donald M. Terry	Sophomore					Albany, New York
	(United States)	Milford D. Walker	Freshman	D				Short Hills, New Jersey

== Standings ==
1928–29 Eastern Collegiate ice hockey standings
	Intercollegiate							Overall					
	GP	W	L	T	Pct.	GF	GA	GP	W	L	T	GF	GA
Amherst	8	3	4	1	.438	13	18	9	3	5	1	14	20
Army	9	2	7	0	.222	11	50	12	3	9	0	23	61
Bates	11	4	6	1	.409	26	20	12	5	6	1	28	21
Boston College	10	4	6	0	.400	29	27	14	5	9	0	36	42
Boston University	10	9	1	0	.900	36	9	12	9	2	1	39	14
Bowdoin	9	5	4	0	.556	11	14	9	5	4	0	11	14
Brown	–	–	–	–	–	–	–	13	8	5	0	–	–
Clarkson	7	6	1	0	.857	43	11	10	9	1	0	60	19
Colby	5	0	4	1	.100	4	11	5	0	4	1	4	11
Colgate	7	4	3	0	.571	16	18	7	4	3	0	16	18
Connecticut Agricultural	–	–	–	–	–	–	–	–	–	–	–	–	–
Cornell	5	2	3	0	.400	7	9	5	2	3	0	7	9
Dartmouth	–	–	–	–	–	–	–	17	9	5	3	58	28
Hamilton	–	–	–	–	–	–	–	10	4	6	0	–	–
Harvard	7	4	3	0	.571	26	10	10	5	4	1	31	15
Massachusetts Agricultural	11	6	5	0	.545	30	20	12	7	5	0	33	21
Middlebury	10	7	3	0	.700	27	29	10	7	3	0	27	29
MIT	11	5	6	0	.455	26	32	11	5	6	0	26	32
New Hampshire	11	6	4	1	.591	23	20	11	6	4	1	23	20
Norwich	–	–	–	–	–	–	–	8	2	6	0	–	–
Pennsylvania	11	2	9	0	.182	12	82	13	2	10	1	–	–
Princeton	–	–	–	–	–	–	–	19	15	3	1	–	–
Rensselaer	–	–	–	–	–	–	–	4	1	3	0	–	–
St. John's	–	–	–	–	–	–	–	7	3	3	1	–	–
St. Lawrence	–	–	–	–	–	–	–	8	3	4	1	–	–
St. Stephen's	–	–	–	–	–	–	–	–	–	–	–	–	–
Syracuse	–	–	–	–	–	–	–	–	–	–	–	–	–
Union	5	2	2	1	.500	17	14	5	2	2	1	17	14
Vermont	–	–	–	–	–	–	–	–	–	–	–	–	–
Williams	10	6	4	0	.600	33	16	10	6	4	0	33	16
Yale	12	10	1	1	.875	47	9	17	15	1	1	64	12

== Schedule and results ==
Date	Opponent	Site	Result	Record
Exhibition
January 12	Clinton Town*	Freshman Football Rink • Hamilton, New York (Exhibition)	L 3–4	
February 2	Clinton Town*	Clinton, New York (Exhibition)	W 4–1	
Regular Season
February 5	Dartmouth*	Freshman Football Rink • Hamilton, New York	L 1–9	0–1–0
February 8	at Cornell*	Beebe Lake • Ithaca, New York	L 1–3	0–2–0
February 15	at Union*	Central Park Rink • Schenectady, New York	L 1–3	0–3–0
February 16	at Army*	Stuart Rink • West Point, New York	W 8–1	1–3–0
February 20	St. Lawrence*	Freshman Football Rink • Hamilton, New York	W 2–1 ^{OT}	2–3–0
February 23	Cornell*	Freshman Football Rink • Hamilton, New York	W 2–1	3–3–0
March 2	at Hamilton*	Russell Sage Rink • Clinton, New York	W 1–0 ^{OT}	4–3–0
*Non-conference game.

== Scoring statistics ==
Name	Position	Games	Goals	Assists	Points
Bob Hofheins	LW	7	7	2	9
Francis Howe	C	7	5	1	6
James Nelson	RW	7	2	0	2
Willard Fischer	C	4	1	0	1
John Spelder	D	7	1	0	1
Clifton Anderson	Sub.	6	0	1	1
Albert Chambers	G	7	0	0	0
Milford Walker	D	-	0	0	0
Donald Terry	Sub.	-	0	0	0
Warren Barnes	D	-	0	0	0
Howard Crane	Sub.	-	0	0	0
Samuel Noyes	Sub.	-	0	0	0
Arthur Schiebel	Sub.	-	0	0	0
Total			16	4	20

Note: Assists were recorded infrequently.
