= 1928–29 New Hampshire Wildcats men's ice hockey season =

- Conference: Independent
- Home ice: UNH Ice Rink

Record
- Overall: 6–4–1
- Home: 3–3–0
- Road: 3–1–1

Coaches and captains
- Head coach: Ernest Christensen
- Captain: Al Reinhart

The 1928–29 New Hampshire Wildcats men's ice hockey season was the 5th season of play for the program. The Wildcats represented the University of New Hampshire and were coached by Ernest Christensen in his 4th season.

== Season ==
As the season began for New Hampshire, the team was having to deal with the loss of most of its experience. team captain Al Reinhart was the only returning starter, while only a handful of others had ever appeared in a game. The entire defense had to be rebuilt with all former defensemen and goaltenders having graduated, save for a brief appearance by Hunt the year before. While there was more to work with on the forward line, coach Christensen would have to find a replacement for Warren Percival, who had led the offence in scoring for the past three seasons.

Even with poor weather hampering their development, the Wildcats opened the year with a home game right after the winter break. The lack of teamwork and practice time left New Hampshire at a disadvantage to start and allowed the Engineers to score 5 goals in the first two periods. However, once the team got its skating legs, the played far better in the third. Plourde scored the only goal of the period, preventing the Wildcats from being shutout, and gave hope for better things to come. A few days later, the team looked ready from the drop of the puck and Ed Hunt put forth a far better performance. Only once did the senior netminder allow the rubber to get behind him while Plourde and Croke provided just enough offense for the win. The next game was much the same with the forward line providing two goals (Reinhart and Plourde). Hunt was even better in goal, stopping every shot for his first career shutout.

The team continued its hot streak by hosting the inexperienced and undermanned Connecticut Agricultural. The visitors battled hard but they were no match for the Wildcats. New Hampshire jumped out to an early lead and steamrolled the Aggies. Reinhart and Croke each recorded hat-tricks in the game while Young, who was one of many alternates used, scored the other two markers. Poor weather forced a rematch with Bowdoin and a second game against Colby to be cancelled. Instead of sitting around, the team arranged a three-game road trip on the fly. First up was a rematch with Brown with the Bears keen for revenge. Howie Crins, a former Wildcat who had transferred two years earlier, came back to haunt his old club by opening the scoring and then assisting on another marker. Brown scored the first four goals before Moore finally got New Hampshire on the scoresheet but by then it was too late. Hunt was kept busy all night and finished with 39 saves while UNH could only get the puck on goal 13 times. The team quickly recovered the following night and scored five times against a weak Army team but after that, the Wildcats' scoring dried up.

On their way back, the team stopped off for a game with Bates. Both teams skated up and down the ice and provided a good deal of excitement, however, neither could solve the opposing netminders. No matter what New Hampshire attempted, their efforts were stopped by a magnificent goaltending performance. The only score of the evening came from a Bobcat stick, however, it occurred when one of the forwards accidentally knocked the puck into his own goal. This is the first and only time in program history where the team won a game in regulation without any player being credited with a goal. After a brief stop back on campus, the team left for a quick jaunt to Amherst. Playing the local college first, the game was a defensive struggle from the start and neither team was able to score. Hunt was solely responsible for saving the team from defeat. After four 5-minute overtime periods, the game was called due to darkness. The following evening, the team faced Massachusetts Agricultural. The game had much more action that the one with Amherst but only slightly more scoring. Reinhart managed to score on a solo dash up the ice for the game's only goal. The match also saw Stan Hunt set program records for shutouts in a season (4) as well as consecutive (3) that would stand for many years.

UNH attempted to reschedule the Colby game for February 9, however, the weather would still no cooperate and the match was finally abandoned. Instead the team prepared to meet Boston University during the winter carnival but would have to do so without Croke. The starting winger had been suffered an off-ice accident than resulted in the loss of one of his fingers. While the team did feel his absence against the Terriers, it was the defense that faltered. Hunt played another stellar game in goal but he was left to fend for himself on too many occasions. BU's passing put the home team to shame and allowed them to rack up 5 goals against the star goalie. Plourde netted the only goal for UNH on the evening. A week later, the Wildcats wrapped up their season by welcoming Bates for a rematch. The recent dearth of scoring continued; the visitors netted three goals in the first 30 minutes while Reinhart scored the only goal for UNH in the third period. New Hampshire ended the year by scoring just four goals in its final five games but they came away with an even record during that stretch.

Robert L. Snodgrass served as team manager.

== Roster ==
No.	Nat.	Player	Class	Pos	Height	Weight	DoB	Hometown	Previous team
	(United States)	George C. Colburn Jr.	Sophomore	D/F			1907-02-09	Newton, Massachusetts
	(United States)	Henry W. Croke	Sophomore	RW				Claremont, New Hampshire
	(United States)	Paul W. Higgins	Sophomore	C/RW			1907-11-22	Cranston, Rhode Island
	(United States)	Edward H. Hunt	Senior	G			1904-11-22	Exeter, New Hampshire
	(United States)	Hubert A. Lavallee	Senior	C				Berlin, New Hampshire
	(United States)	Donald J. McFarland	Junior	D				Concord, New Hampshire
	(United States)	A. Dennis Michaud	Junior	D			1905-09-15	Gorham, New Hampshire
	(United States)	Everett B. Moore	Senior	RW			1907-03-28	Keene, New Hampshire
	(United States)	John A. Parkinson	Sophomore	RW			1909-09-16	Penacook, New Hampshire
	(United States)	Edward Plourde	Junior	C				Manchester, New Hampshire
	(United States)	Alvin R. Reinhart (C)	Senior	LW			1907-06-23	Medfield, Massachusetts
	(United States)	Clarence E. Sprague	Senior	D				Concord, New Hampshire
	(United States)	George W. Tasker	Sophomore	G			1906-07-01	New London, New Hampshire
	(United States)	Kenneth E. Wheeler	Junior	D/LW				New London, New Hampshire
	(United States)	William W. Wooldridge	Sophomore	LW				Laconia, New Hampshire
	(United States)	Norman H. Young	Senior	C/LW			1905-01-22	Portsmouth, New Hampshire

== Standings ==
1928–29 Eastern Collegiate ice hockey standings
	Intercollegiate							Overall					
	GP	W	L	T	Pct.	GF	GA	GP	W	L	T	GF	GA
Amherst	8	3	4	1	.438	13	18	9	3	5	1	14	20
Army	9	2	7	0	.222	11	50	12	3	9	0	23	61
Bates	11	4	6	1	.409	26	20	12	5	6	1	28	21
Boston College	10	4	6	0	.400	29	27	14	5	9	0	36	42
Boston University	10	9	1	0	.900	36	9	12	9	2	1	39	14
Bowdoin	9	5	4	0	.556	11	14	9	5	4	0	11	14
Brown	–	–	–	–	–	–	–	13	8	5	0	–	–
Clarkson	7	6	1	0	.857	43	11	10	9	1	0	60	19
Colby	5	0	4	1	.100	4	11	5	0	4	1	4	11
Colgate	7	4	3	0	.571	16	18	7	4	3	0	16	18
Connecticut Agricultural	–	–	–	–	–	–	–	–	–	–	–	–	–
Cornell	5	2	3	0	.400	7	9	5	2	3	0	7	9
Dartmouth	–	–	–	–	–	–	–	17	9	5	3	58	28
Hamilton	–	–	–	–	–	–	–	10	4	6	0	–	–
Harvard	7	4	3	0	.571	26	10	10	5	4	1	31	15
Massachusetts Agricultural	11	6	5	0	.545	30	20	12	7	5	0	33	21
Middlebury	10	7	3	0	.700	27	29	10	7	3	0	27	29
MIT	11	5	6	0	.455	26	32	11	5	6	0	26	32
New Hampshire	11	6	4	1	.591	23	20	11	6	4	1	23	20
Norwich	–	–	–	–	–	–	–	8	2	6	0	–	–
Pennsylvania	11	2	9	0	.182	12	82	13	2	10	1	–	–
Princeton	–	–	–	–	–	–	–	19	15	3	1	–	–
Rensselaer	–	–	–	–	–	–	–	4	1	3	0	–	–
St. John's	–	–	–	–	–	–	–	7	3	3	1	–	–
St. Lawrence	–	–	–	–	–	–	–	8	3	4	1	–	–
St. Stephen's	–	–	–	–	–	–	–	–	–	–	–	–	–
Syracuse	–	–	–	–	–	–	–	–	–	–	–	–	–
Union	5	2	2	1	.500	17	14	5	2	2	1	17	14
Vermont	–	–	–	–	–	–	–	–	–	–	–	–	–
Williams	10	6	4	0	.600	33	16	10	6	4	0	33	16
Yale	12	10	1	1	.875	47	9	17	15	1	1	64	12

== Schedule and results ==
Date	Opponent	Site	Result	Record
Regular Season
January 5	MIT*	UNH Ice Rink • Durham, New Hampshire	L 1–5	0–1–0
January 9	Brown*	UNH Ice Rink • Durham, New Hampshire	W 2–1	1–1–0
January 12	Bowdoin*	UNH Ice Rink • Durham, New Hampshire	W 2–0	2–1–0
January 16	Connecticut Agricultural*	UNH Ice Rink • Durham, New Hampshire	W 8–1	3–1–0
January 25	at Brown*	Rhode Island Auditorium • Providence, Rhode Island	L 1–4	3–2–0
January 26	at Army*	Stuart Rink • West Point, New York	W 5–1	4–2–0
January 29	at Bates*	Bartlett Street Rink • Lewiston, Maine	W 1–0	5–2–0
February 1	at Amherst*	Pratt Field Rink • Amherst, Massachusetts	T 0–0 ^{4OT}	5–2–1
February 2	at Massachusetts Agricultural*	Alumni Field Rink • Amherst, Massachusetts	W 1–0	6–2–1
February 16	Boston University*	UNH Ice Rink • Durham, New Hampshire	L 1–5	6–3–1
February 22	Bates*	UNH Ice Rink • Durham, New Hampshire	L 1–3	6–4–1
*Non-conference game.
