= 1928–29 Boston College Eagles men's ice hockey season =

- Conference: Independent
- Home ice: Boston Arena

Record
- Overall: 5–9–0
- Home: 3–2–0
- Road: 1–5–0
- Neutral: 1–2–0

Coaches and captains
- Head coach: Sonny Foley
- Captain(s): Art Morrissey; Nick Tedesco

The 1928–29 Boston College Eagles men's ice hockey season was the 12th season of play for the program. The Eagles were coached by Sonny Foley in his 2nd season.

== Season ==
Before the start of the season, Boston College was finally able to resolve the issues it had with scheduling college opponents and put together a slate that would allow the team to compete for an intercollegiate title. Unfortunately, the news wasn't all good; Nick Tedesco, one of the top-rated wingers in the country, was told by doctors that he would have to sit out the entire season. Worse, most of the returning players were unavailable for the first match against Dartmouth and coach Foley had to rely on a contingent made up entirely of men from last year's freshman team. Despite the long odds, the team did well to hold the powerful Indians to just 3 goals.

Once many of the regular starters returned after New Years, they showed a lack of teamwork as they had yet to figure out how to operate without Tedesco. Against Loyola, "Pete" Sanford was starting his first game at center but apparently didn't know how to fulfill the role and never attempted to pass the puck to his wingers. On the rare occasions where the Eagles were able to get into the Warriors' end, their shots were easily turned aside. On the other end of the ice, Art Morrissey had his hands full stemming the tide. Though BC made the Canadians work for every goal, there was no shortage in scoring and the Eagles were soundly beaten to the tune of 0–6.

The Eagles had little time to recover from their poor start as they played three games over a four-day road trip. They headed north first for a rematch with Dartmouth. While the club performed better than it had in the opening match, which included the first two goals on the year from Horan and Payson, they fell short by 3 goals once more. Two days later, the team got back on track against a Pennsylvania squad that was playing its first season in six years. That victory nearly carried over into the next night when BC gave another championship contender, Princeton, everything they could handle. Fitzgerald held the Tigers scoreless in the first two periods, allowing Sliney's goal early in the second to give BC a lead going into the third. The Eagles were playing a very strong game on both ends of the ice to that point but Princeton would not go down without a fight. Two goals midway through the period gave the Tigers their first lead, however, Gibson soon had the score tied While Morrissey got Boston College its second lead with less than 2 minutes to play. Unfortunately, the defense was caught napping after the faceoff and Princeton knotted the score once more just 18 seconds later. In the first the two 5-minute overtime periods, Princeton scored and then were content to play defense for the rest of the match. BC tried desperately to get another goal but they were turned aside each time.

Boston College returned from its arduous trip and began to prepare for the first of two games with rival Boston University. In a very physical game, the Terriers dominated play for most of the match. Gibson had the only tally for the Eagles, who were able to keep pace with BU at the start but wore down as time went on. The game also became increasingly physical as it progressed with 20 penalties were handed out between the two teams. By the end of the match, there were only five skaters on the ice (three for BU two for BC) with the rest having been crammed into the penalty box. After the game, the team elected Morrissey as team captain for the remainder of the season. The next week, the team took on the Boston Athletic Association and ended up getting into a track meet. At the start, the puck was skated up the ice constantly from BAA, with Boston College only shooting the puck down to the other end of the rink. Fitzgerald was left on his own during this time but he played brilliantly, making 10 saves in the first 5 minutes. The amateur netminder, on the other hand, faced just 3 shots in the first period. BC woke up in the second and began to attack the BAA cage. Both teams played like they were trying to outskate the other and treated the fans to a tremendous exhibition. The amateurs scored in the second but the goals was disallowed, leaving the game scoreless the start of the third. BC finally broke the tie when Scully sent a harmless shot from the corner in front of the goal. It rebounded off of a defender's skate and into the net. BAA tied the game a few minutes later with a head-hunting shot that forced Fitzgerald to duck out of the way. The final goal resulted when Gibson found an open Groden in front of the cage who whacked the puck past the amateurs' netminder for the winner.

After pausing for the exam break, the team returned with a match against Holy Cross. Fitzgerald was the star of the show, stopping several scoring opportunities from the Crusaders to earn his first shutout of the season. Morrissey bookended the scoring with two goals and the Eagles looked like they hand finally rounded into form. They got a chance to show off that presumed improvement with their rematch to Boston University in the next game. The game was only slightly less physical as both teams sought to beat the other into submission. Unfortunately for the Eagles, they were without the services of Gibson and their offense suffered accordingly. Though the play on the ice was mostly even, the score was identical to the first game and BC fell 1–4. Two days later the Eagles shook off the loss by downing Penn for the second time that season. Sanford's hat-trick led the way to a 6–1 win that saw Boston College dominate from the opening faceoff.

BC then headed off on its second road trip of the year, making its first stop in Connecticut for a match with Yale. The Elis had no sympathy for BC, who were still without Gibson, and pumped 5 goals past Fitzgerald. Though the Eagles managed to keep pace with the speedy Bulldogs for much of the game, they had no offensive punch and even managed to miss an open cage in the second period. By the end of the week, the Eagles were in Montreal for their second game with Loyola. This time the Maroon squad put up a decent fight and had the match tied entering the third period. However, the long trip may have taken something out of the team as it slowed visibly in the third. Loyola netted two quick goals and skated away with another win. The next night the team faced an aggregation of former Canadian college players who were used to facing professional clubs. Fitzgerald played what might have been the best game of his career, turning aside several glorious scoring chances. Though they ultimately fell in the game, the fact that the team managed to keep the score within one goal spoke very highly of the squad.

The final game came at the beginning of March against Holy Cross. Just as they had in the first match, BC overpowered the Crusaders, scoring 6 goals to carry the day. The one blemish came midway through when Fitzgerald let in a soft goal. After his shutout bid was ruined, Marr was installed in goal and allowed to get his first taste of game action.

Despite the poor record, BC had performed well during the season. Unfortunately, the program would later be shuttered due to the Wall Street crash and would not return until 1933.

Robert F. Buck served as team manager.

== Roster ==
No.	Nat.	Player	Class	Pos	Height	Weight	DoB	Hometown	Previous team
		Joseph W. Fallon	Junior	LW
	(United States)	Leon C. Fitzgerald	Junior	G			1908-01-30	Weymouth, Massachusetts
	(United States)	Lawrence W. Gibson	Junior	LW				Cambridge, Massachusetts
	(United States)	John F. Groden	Junior	RW			1908-03-16	Watertown, Massachusetts
		Lawrence J. Horan	Sophomore
	(United States)	Edmund L. Kelleher	Junior	C				West Roxbury, Massachusetts
	(United States)	John D. Marr Jr.	Freshman	G				Dorchester, Massachusetts
	(United States)	Arthur M. Morrissey (C)	Senior	D				Medford, Massachusetts
		John J. O'Neill	Sophomore	RW
	(United States)	Perley J. Payson	Junior	LW			1906-09-13	Quincy, Massachusetts
	(United States)	Laurence F. Sanford	Sophomore	C				Melrose, Massachusetts
	(United States)	Caleb J. Scully	Freshman	D			1906-05-14	Hamilton, Massachusetts
		Joseph W. Shea	Sophomore	C
	(United States)	Edward G. Sliney	Junior	D			1905-06-09	Boston, Massachusetts
	(United States)	Nicholas P. Tedesco (C)	Senior					West Newton, Massachusetts

== Standings ==
1928–29 Eastern Collegiate ice hockey standings
	Intercollegiate							Overall					
	GP	W	L	T	Pct.	GF	GA	GP	W	L	T	GF	GA
Amherst	8	3	4	1	.438	13	18	9	3	5	1	14	20
Army	9	2	7	0	.222	11	50	12	3	9	0	23	61
Bates	11	4	6	1	.409	26	20	12	5	6	1	28	21
Boston College	10	4	6	0	.400	29	27	14	5	9	0	36	42
Boston University	10	9	1	0	.900	36	9	12	9	2	1	39	14
Bowdoin	9	5	4	0	.556	11	14	9	5	4	0	11	14
Brown	–	–	–	–	–	–	–	13	8	5	0	–	–
Clarkson	7	6	1	0	.857	43	11	10	9	1	0	60	19
Colby	5	0	4	1	.100	4	11	5	0	4	1	4	11
Colgate	7	4	3	0	.571	16	18	7	4	3	0	16	18
Connecticut Agricultural	–	–	–	–	–	–	–	–	–	–	–	–	–
Cornell	5	2	3	0	.400	7	9	5	2	3	0	7	9
Dartmouth	–	–	–	–	–	–	–	17	9	5	3	58	28
Hamilton	–	–	–	–	–	–	–	10	4	6	0	–	–
Harvard	7	4	3	0	.571	26	10	10	5	4	1	31	15
Massachusetts Agricultural	11	6	5	0	.545	30	20	12	7	5	0	33	21
Middlebury	10	7	3	0	.700	27	29	10	7	3	0	27	29
MIT	11	5	6	0	.455	26	32	11	5	6	0	26	32
New Hampshire	11	6	4	1	.591	23	20	11	6	4	1	23	20
Norwich	–	–	–	–	–	–	–	8	2	6	0	–	–
Pennsylvania	11	2	9	0	.182	12	82	13	2	10	1	–	–
Princeton	–	–	–	–	–	–	–	19	15	3	1	–	–
Rensselaer	–	–	–	–	–	–	–	4	1	3	0	–	–
St. John's	–	–	–	–	–	–	–	7	3	3	1	–	–
St. Lawrence	–	–	–	–	–	–	–	8	3	4	1	–	–
St. Stephen's	–	–	–	–	–	–	–	–	–	–	–	–	–
Syracuse	–	–	–	–	–	–	–	–	–	–	–	–	–
Union	5	2	2	1	.500	17	14	5	2	2	1	17	14
Vermont	–	–	–	–	–	–	–	–	–	–	–	–	–
Williams	10	6	4	0	.600	33	16	10	6	4	0	33	16
Yale	12	10	1	1	.875	47	9	17	15	1	1	64	12

== Schedule and results ==
Date	Opponent	Site	Result	Record
Regular Season
December 21	Dartmouth*	Boston Arena • Boston, Massachusetts	L 0–3	0–1–0
January 5	Loyola*	Boston Arena • Boston, Massachusetts	L 0–6	0–2–0
January 9	at Dartmouth*	Occom pond • Hanover, New Hampshire	L 2–5	0–3–0
January 11	at Pennsylvania*	Philadelphia Ice Palace • Philadelphia, Pennsylvania	W 6–0	1–3–0
January 12	at Princeton*	Hobey Baker Memorial Rink • Princeton, New Jersey	L 3–4 ^{2OT}	1–4–0
January 18	vs. Boston University*	Boston Arena • Boston, Massachusetts (Rivalry)	L 1–4	1–5–0
January 25	vs. Boston Athletic Association*	Boston Arena • Boston, Massachusetts	W 2–1	2–5–0
February 6	Holy Cross*	Boston Arena • Boston, Massachusetts	W 4–0	3–5–0
February 13	vs. Boston University*	Boston Arena • Boston, Massachusetts (Rivalry)	L 1–4	3–6–0
February 15	Pennsylvania*	Boston Arena • Boston, Massachusetts	W 6–1	4–6–0
February 19	at Yale*	New Haven Arena • New Haven, Connecticut	L 0–5	4–7–0
February 22	at Loyola*	Montreal, Quebec	L 3–5	4–8–0
February 23	at Sherbrooke Hockey Club*	Sherbrooke, Quebec	L 2–3	4–9–0
March 1	Holy Cross*	Boston Arena • Boston, Massachusetts	W 6–1	5–9–0
*Non-conference game.
