= 1928–29 Union Skating Dutchmen ice hockey season =

- Conference: Independent
- Home ice: Central Park Rink

Record
- Overall: 2–2–1
- Home: 2–0–0
- Road: 0–2–0
- Neutral: 0–0–1

Coaches and captains
- Head coach: Harold A. Larrabee
- Captain: Bob Beale

The 1928–29 Union Skating Dutchmen men's ice hockey season was the 16th season of play for the program. The Skating Dutchmen represented Union College and were coached by Harold A. Larrabee in his 4th season.

== Season ==
Union received some welcome news at the start of the season as the city decided to build a new temporary ice rink atop the tennis courts in Central Park. The hope was that the new, larger rink would allow the team to be better prepared when it went on the road. More good new came in the form of the large contingent of players who appeared at the first practice of the season. While eleven of the twenty five candidates were freshman and would not be eligible to play until after the February exams, the continued interest would help keep the sport alive on campus. After the new year, Union's president, Frank Parker Day, announced that the school would adopt a new rule barring freshmen from participating in varsity sports. This policy had already been in effect at other institutions and was not unexpected, however, it would not come into effect until the following fall semester and didn't immediately affect the team.

The team's initial contest was supposed to be against Cornell at the start of the month. Unfortunately, several members of team came down with Influenza and the match was cancelled. While the team recovered, they were able to get some additional practice time in and get themselves better prepared for their first game. The Dutchmen made their first appearance of the season at Williamstown and looked equal to the task for most of the game. Union kept touch with Williams in the first two periods and entered the third tied at 1-all. Here, the superior depth of the Ephs came into play as Williams made many substitutions in the final frame and the fresh legs enabled the Purple to score four goals in quick succession to take the match. Union was then forced to cancel their match with Rensselaer due to a lack of ice.

The last game for the team before the midterm break was against Hamilton and the Garnet produced their best performance to date against the Continentals. While Hamilton gained an early edge, Union's defense didn't allow the blue and buff to get out of range. Henafelt knotted the score at the start of the second period while a goal from Hedinger soon after gave the Dutchmen the lead. Union held the edge until the waning moments of the third when Hamilton managed to slip the puck past Foster and send the match to extra time. After neither team could score in the first overtime, Hamilton potted two in the second overtime to take the game but Union had already proved themselves to be a much improved team.

After the exam break, Union returned to the ice and met Colgate at home. Carr, a freshman, was inserted into the lineup at center with team captain Bob Beale moving to wing. Two other freshmen, Drake and Catone, got onto the ice as well but it was the veterans that were the heroes for the Dutchmen. Captain Beale led off the scoring while a pair from Henafelt gave Union the win. Foster stopped 19 shots for the Garnet's first victory in almost two calendar years. A second match with RPI the following day was cancelled due to soft ice and the two were unable to renew their rivalry.

Union ended its season with a pair of games that gave the fans hope for future seasons. First, the Dutchmen were forced to play St. Lawrence on Rensselaer's rink but rather than being disadvantaged by the large surface, the Garnet thrived with the open ice. Union fired 30 shots on goal and only due to the stellar play of the Larries' netminder did the game end in a draw. Henafelt, Bob Beale and Jack Beale each scored in the game. The strong contingent were able to play the final game at home and walloped St. Stephen's 8–1. Captain Beale and Hedinger each had a hat-trick while Carr recorded the first goal of his career. The superiority of the Union squad was apparent all night and the only goal they surrendered came with under a minute to play when Townsend had replaced Foster in goal.

== Roster ==
No.	Nat.	Player	Class	Pos	Height	Weight	DoB	Hometown	Previous team
	(United States)	John S. Beale	Junior	D/LW			1908-11-06	Schenectady, New York
	(United States)	Robert B. Beale Jr. (C)	Senior	C/W			1906-10-06	Schenectady, New York
		Avery W. Carr	Freshman	C
		Vincent Catone	Freshman
		Drake	Freshman	D
		James S. Forbes	Sophomore	D
		Edward P. Foster Jr.	Sophomore	G
		John H. B. Hedinger Jr.	Sophomore	D
		Morton J. Henafelt	Junior	RW			1906-11-03
	(United States)	Arnold W. Kahn	Sophomore	LW/RW			1909-04-07	Waterville, Maine
		Charles L. P. Townsend	Freshman	G
		Weed		G
		Ira C. Werle	Junior	LW

== Standings ==
1928–29 Eastern Collegiate ice hockey standings
	Intercollegiate							Overall					
	GP	W	L	T	Pct.	GF	GA	GP	W	L	T	GF	GA
Amherst	8	3	4	1	.438	13	18	9	3	5	1	14	20
Army	9	2	7	0	.222	11	50	12	3	9	0	23	61
Bates	11	4	6	1	.409	26	20	12	5	6	1	28	21
Boston College	10	4	6	0	.400	29	27	14	5	9	0	36	42
Boston University	10	9	1	0	.900	36	9	12	9	2	1	39	14
Bowdoin	9	5	4	0	.556	11	14	9	5	4	0	11	14
Brown	–	–	–	–	–	–	–	13	8	5	0	–	–
Clarkson	7	6	1	0	.857	43	11	10	9	1	0	60	19
Colby	5	0	4	1	.100	4	11	5	0	4	1	4	11
Colgate	7	4	3	0	.571	16	18	7	4	3	0	16	18
Connecticut Agricultural	–	–	–	–	–	–	–	–	–	–	–	–	–
Cornell	5	2	3	0	.400	7	9	5	2	3	0	7	9
Dartmouth	–	–	–	–	–	–	–	17	9	5	3	58	28
Hamilton	–	–	–	–	–	–	–	10	4	6	0	–	–
Harvard	7	4	3	0	.571	26	10	10	5	4	1	31	15
Massachusetts Agricultural	11	6	5	0	.545	30	20	12	7	5	0	33	21
Middlebury	10	7	3	0	.700	27	29	10	7	3	0	27	29
MIT	11	5	6	0	.455	26	32	11	5	6	0	26	32
New Hampshire	11	6	4	1	.591	23	20	11	6	4	1	23	20
Norwich	–	–	–	–	–	–	–	8	2	6	0	–	–
Pennsylvania	11	2	9	0	.182	12	82	13	2	10	1	–	–
Princeton	–	–	–	–	–	–	–	19	15	3	1	–	–
Rensselaer	–	–	–	–	–	–	–	4	1	3	0	–	–
St. John's	–	–	–	–	–	–	–	7	3	3	1	–	–
St. Lawrence	–	–	–	–	–	–	–	8	3	4	1	–	–
St. Stephen's	–	–	–	–	–	–	–	–	–	–	–	–	–
Syracuse	–	–	–	–	–	–	–	–	–	–	–	–	–
Union	5	2	2	1	.500	17	14	5	2	2	1	17	14
Vermont	–	–	–	–	–	–	–	–	–	–	–	–	–
Williams	10	6	4	0	.600	33	16	10	6	4	0	33	16
Yale	12	10	1	1	.875	47	9	17	15	1	1	64	12

== Schedule and results ==
Date	Opponent	Site	Result	Record
Regular Season
January 16	at Williams*	Sage Hall Rink • Williamstown, Massachusetts	L 1–5	0–1–0
January 28	at Hamilton*	Russell Sage Rink • Clinton, New York	L 2–4 ^{2OT}	0–2–0
February 15	Colgate*	Central Park Rink • Schenectady, New York	W 3–1	1–2–0
February 22	vs. St. Lawrence*	RPI Rink • Troy, New York	T 3–3 ^{2OT}	1–2–1
February 23	St. Stephen's*	Central Park Rink • Schenectady, New York	W 8–1	2–2–1
*Non-conference game.

== Scoring statistics ==
Name	Position	Games	Goals
Bob Beale	C/LW/RW	5	5
Morton Henafelt	RW	5	5
John Hedinger	D	5	4
Jack Beale	D/LW	5	2
Avery Carr	C	3	1
Weed	G	1	0
James Forbes	D	2	0
Charles Townsend	G	2	0
Vincent Catone		3	0
Drake	D	3	0
Ira Werle	LW	3	0
Edward Foster	G	5	0
Arnold Kahn	LW/RW	5	0
Total			17
