= Raymond A. Watkins =

American football and ice hockey coach (1892–1972)

Biographical details
- Born: September 23, 1892
- Died: December 13, 1972 (aged 80); Carrabelle, Florida, U.S.

Playing career

Football
- 1917: Colgate
- Position: Quarterback

Coaching career (HC unless noted)

Football
- 1920: Holderness Prep (NJ)
- 1921: Bates
- 1923–1927: Rutherford HS (NJ)
- 1928–1932: Colgate (freshmen)

Ice hockey
- 1921–1922: Bates
- 1928–1932: Colgate

Accomplishments and honors

Awards
- First-team All-American (1917)

Raymond A. "Razor" Watkins (September 23, 1892 – December 13, 1972) was an American football and ice hockey coach. He served as the head football coach at Bates College in 1921. In 1928, he returned to his alma mater, Colgate University, to serve as the head ice hockey coach, a position he held from 1928 to 1932.

== Head coaching record ==
=== Ice hockey ===
Record table
Season	Team	Overall	Conference	Standing	Postseason
Bates Independent (1921–1922)
1921–22	Bates	8–5–0			
Bates:		8–5–0			
Colgate Red Raiders Independent (1928–1932)
1928–29	Colgate	4–3–0			
1929–30	Colgate	1–4–1			
1930–31	Colgate	1–2–0			
1931–32	Colgate	0–2–0			
Colgate:		6–11–1			
Total:		14–16–1			
