= 1928–29 Army Cadets men's ice hockey season =

- Conference: Independent
- Home ice: Stuart Rink; Bear Mountain Rink

Record
- Overall: 3–10–0
- Home: 3–9–0
- Road: 0–1–0

Coaches and captains
- Head coach: Ray Marchand
- Captain: Normando Costello

The 1928–29 Army Cadets men's ice hockey season was the 26th season of play for the program. The team finished with a record of 3–10–0, competing as an NCAA Division I independent. The season was coached by Ray Marchand in his 6th year at the helm. A colder winter allowed the team to return to a full schedule at the Stuart Rink for the first time in three years. Despite opening the season with a victory, Army dropped eight consecutive games before recovering to win two of their final four contests. Team captain Normando Costello, who played goal, was recognized as the team's best player throughout the season.

== Season ==
The 1928–29 season coincided with colder winter temperatures than the program had experienced in recent years. The dip in temperature allowed the team to return to a full schedule on the Stuart Rink for the first time in three years. The lack of practice time over that stretch continued to affect the team's performance, and after opening the season with a win, Army dropped eight contests in a row. During the losing streak, the Cadets were rarely competitive; however, results gradually improved as the season progressed.

Team captain Normando Costello was lauded for his play in goal and was regarded as the team's best player for much of the season. Observers attributed the high number of goals allowed primarily to the poor play of the team's skaters.

Regular access to Stuart Rink for most of the season allowed Marchand to develop greater cohesion within the team. In the last four games of the year, Army was able to score at least three goals in each game, a far cry from the 13 total markers they had earned in the first nine matches. The steady improvement gave hope to observers that Army could soon produce a winning season.

== Roster ==
No.	Nat.	Player	Class	Pos	Height	Weight	DoB	Hometown	Previous team
	(United States)	Marshall S. Carter	Sophomore	LW			1909-09-16	Fort Monroe, Virginia
	(United States)	Frederic H. Chaffee	Senior	LW/RW				Faribault, Minnesota
	(United States)	Normando A. Costello (C)	Senior	G			1905-06-19	Franklin, Massachusetts
	(United States)	Edward J. Cotter	Sophomore	LW			1908-04-30	Canton, Massachusetts
	(United States)	Rudolph Fink	Senior	D			1905-01-24	Nome, Alaska
	(United States)	Harvey P. Huglin	Freshman	D			1910-05-09	Fairfield, Iowa
	(United States)	Roy E. Lindquist	Junior	C			1907-02-18	West Newton, Massachusetts
	(United States)	Milton H. Pressley Jr.	Sophomore	D			1906-09-29	Miami, Florida
	(United States)	Jacquard H. Rothschild	Junior	RW			1907-12-22	Chicago, Illinois
	(United States)	Donald M. Schorr	Senior	D				New Jersey
	(United States)	Walter C. Sweeney Jr.	Junior	LW			1909-07-23	Wheeling, West Virginia
	(United States)	Field H. Tapping	Sophomore	C/RW			1905-12-29	Milwaukee, Wisconsin
	(United States)	John K. Waters	Sophomore	D			1906-12-20	Baltimore, Maryland

== Standings ==
1928–29 Eastern Collegiate ice hockey standings
	Intercollegiate							Overall					
	GP	W	L	T	Pct.	GF	GA	GP	W	L	T	GF	GA
Amherst	8	3	4	1	.438	13	18	9	3	5	1	14	20
Army	9	2	7	0	.222	11	50	12	3	9	0	23	61
Bates	11	4	6	1	.409	26	20	12	5	6	1	28	21
Boston College	10	4	6	0	.400	29	27	14	5	9	0	36	42
Boston University	10	9	1	0	.900	36	9	12	9	2	1	39	14
Bowdoin	9	5	4	0	.556	11	14	9	5	4	0	11	14
Brown	–	–	–	–	–	–	–	13	8	5	0	–	–
Clarkson	7	6	1	0	.857	43	11	10	9	1	0	60	19
Colby	5	0	4	1	.100	4	11	5	0	4	1	4	11
Colgate	7	4	3	0	.571	16	18	7	4	3	0	16	18
Connecticut Agricultural	–	–	–	–	–	–	–	–	–	–	–	–	–
Cornell	5	2	3	0	.400	7	9	5	2	3	0	7	9
Dartmouth	–	–	–	–	–	–	–	17	9	5	3	58	28
Hamilton	–	–	–	–	–	–	–	10	4	6	0	–	–
Harvard	7	4	3	0	.571	26	10	10	5	4	1	31	15
Massachusetts Agricultural	11	6	5	0	.545	30	20	12	7	5	0	33	21
Middlebury	10	7	3	0	.700	27	29	10	7	3	0	27	29
MIT	11	5	6	0	.455	26	32	11	5	6	0	26	32
New Hampshire	11	6	4	1	.591	23	20	11	6	4	1	23	20
Norwich	–	–	–	–	–	–	–	8	2	6	0	–	–
Pennsylvania	11	2	9	0	.182	12	82	13	2	10	1	–	–
Princeton	–	–	–	–	–	–	–	19	15	3	1	–	–
Rensselaer	–	–	–	–	–	–	–	4	1	3	0	–	–
St. John's	–	–	–	–	–	–	–	7	3	3	1	–	–
St. Lawrence	–	–	–	–	–	–	–	8	3	4	1	–	–
St. Stephen's	–	–	–	–	–	–	–	–	–	–	–	–	–
Syracuse	–	–	–	–	–	–	–	–	–	–	–	–	–
Union	5	2	2	1	.500	17	14	5	2	2	1	17	14
Vermont	–	–	–	–	–	–	–	–	–	–	–	–	–
Williams	10	6	4	0	.600	33	16	10	6	4	0	33	16
Yale	12	10	1	1	.875	47	9	17	15	1	1	64	12

== Schedule and results ==
Date	Opponent	Site	Result	Record
Regular Season
?	St. Stephen's*	Stuart Rink • West Point, New York	W 5–2	1–0–0
January 12	Williams*	Stuart Rink • West Point, New York	L 0–10	1–1–0
January 16	Massachusetts Agricultural*	Stuart Rink • West Point, New York	L 1–3	1–2–0
January 19	Bates*	Stuart Rink • West Point, New York	L 0–5	1–3–0
January 26	New Hampshire*	Stuart Rink • West Point, New York	L 1–5	1–4–0
February 2	MIT*	Stuart Rink • West Point, New York	L 2–5	1–5–0
February 6	Dartmouth*	Stuart Rink • West Point, New York	L 0–9	1–6–0
February 9	Amherst*	Stuart Rink • West Point, New York	L 3–4	1–7–0
February 16	Colgate*	Stuart Rink • West Point, New York	L 1–8	1–8–0
February	Norwich*	Stuart Rink • West Point, New York	W 3–1	2–8–0
February 23	at Royal Military College*	Kingston, Ontario (Rivalry)	L 3–7	2–9–0
February	Poughkeepsie*	Stuart Rink • West Point, New York	L 4–2 †	2–10–0
March 2	Rensselaer*	Bear Mountain Rink • Bear Mountain, New York	W 4–1	3–10–0
*Non-conference game.

† Contemporary Army records include a game against Poughkeepsie, however, those records are confused as to the result of the game. The game is listed as a loss for the Cadets but the score is recorded as 4–2 in their favor.
