= 1928–29 Cornell Big Red men's ice hockey season =

Intercollegiate hockey season

- Home ice: Beebe Lake

Record
- Overall: 2–3–0
- Home: 1–2–0
- Road: 1–1–0

Coaches and captains
- Head coach: Nick Bawlf
- Captain: Earl Clark

The 1928–29 Cornell Big Red Men's Ice Hockey Season was the 24th season of play for the program. The team secured two wins and three losses. The year marked the 9th season for coach Nick Bawlf.

== Season ==
The hockey team got some help at the start of the season when Beebe Lake froze in December. The ice was thin but it could be skated on, allowing the team to practice much earlier than they had in recent years. The team was preparing for their first game against Union but the game was scuppered when four members of the opposition came down with Influenza.

Weather became a concern prior to the next match but the Big Red managed to find enough solid ice to play the game. The puddles and cracks ended up hampering the team and led to a fairly slow match. Unfortunately, Cornell wasn't able to score in the game, despite several chances, and lost 0–1. Cornell was able to even their record with a road win against Williams a week later. Llop ended up with the team's first goal of the season but it was the defensive work in the later part of the game that won it for the Big Red.

After the semester break, Cornell would have to content with a change in net as Rhodes replaced Heye, whose heroics had won the Williams match. He ended up turning in a fine performance and the Big Red won their next game 3–1. Their next game looked to be the team's biggest challenge of the season as they took on a very strong Clarkson squad. The team played hard but the Golden Knights were too much for them and overwhelmed the normally stingy Cornell defense with 5 goals. Rhodes performed well despite taking a stick in the eye and remaining in the contest.

Entering the final game of the season, Cornell lost three regular players to academic ineligibility and would have to replace Guthrie, Kingsbury and Llop. Endemann, Redding and Schoales each played their first game of the season, serving as alternates, with normal alternates filling in the starting roles. Captain Clark also switched to wing for the game, allowing Spitzmiller to start at center. All the changes caused a bit of havoc for the team and the Big Red ended up losing the match 1–2.

== Roster ==
No.	Nat.	Player	Class	Pos	Height	Weight	DoB	Hometown	Previous team
	(United States)	Earl Clark (C)	Senior	C/RW				Utica, New York
	(United States)	Harold T. Clark	Sophomore	D				Utica, New York
	(United States)	Carleton Endemann	Sophomore					New York, New York
	(United States)	Edward Guthrie	Sophomore	W				Ithaca, New York
	(United States)	Lawrence Heye	Sophomore	G				Manhattan, New York
	(United States)	Ernest Kingsbury	Junior	D				Ithaca, New York
	(United States)	Richard Llop	Junior					Manhattan, New York
	(United States)	John Parker	Junior	D				Schenectady, New York
	(United States)	William Redding						Worcester, Massachusetts
	(United States)	Benjamin Rhodes	Sophomore	G				Niagara Falls, New York
	(United States)	Dudley Schoales						Cleveland, Ohio
	(United States)	Robert Spitzmiller	Sophomore	C				Buffalo, New York
	(United States)	Donald Uffinger	Junior	W				Summit, New Jersey
	(United States)	Carl Weagant	Senior					Wilkinsburg, Pennsylvania

== Standings ==
1928–29 Eastern Collegiate ice hockey standings
	Intercollegiate							Overall					
	GP	W	L	T	Pct.	GF	GA	GP	W	L	T	GF	GA
Amherst	8	3	4	1	.438	13	18	9	3	5	1	14	20
Army	9	2	7	0	.222	11	50	12	3	9	0	23	61
Bates	11	4	6	1	.409	26	20	12	5	6	1	28	21
Boston College	10	4	6	0	.400	29	27	14	5	9	0	36	42
Boston University	10	9	1	0	.900	36	9	12	9	2	1	39	14
Bowdoin	9	5	4	0	.556	11	14	9	5	4	0	11	14
Brown	–	–	–	–	–	–	–	13	8	5	0	–	–
Clarkson	7	6	1	0	.857	43	11	10	9	1	0	60	19
Colby	5	0	4	1	.100	4	11	5	0	4	1	4	11
Colgate	7	4	3	0	.571	16	18	7	4	3	0	16	18
Connecticut Agricultural	–	–	–	–	–	–	–	–	–	–	–	–	–
Cornell	5	2	3	0	.400	7	9	5	2	3	0	7	9
Dartmouth	–	–	–	–	–	–	–	17	9	5	3	58	28
Hamilton	–	–	–	–	–	–	–	10	4	6	0	–	–
Harvard	7	4	3	0	.571	26	10	10	5	4	1	31	15
Massachusetts Agricultural	11	6	5	0	.545	30	20	12	7	5	0	33	21
Middlebury	10	7	3	0	.700	27	29	10	7	3	0	27	29
MIT	11	5	6	0	.455	26	32	11	5	6	0	26	32
New Hampshire	11	6	4	1	.591	23	20	11	6	4	1	23	20
Norwich	–	–	–	–	–	–	–	8	2	6	0	–	–
Pennsylvania	11	2	9	0	.182	12	82	13	2	10	1	–	–
Princeton	–	–	–	–	–	–	–	19	15	3	1	–	–
Rensselaer	–	–	–	–	–	–	–	4	1	3	0	–	–
St. John's	–	–	–	–	–	–	–	7	3	3	1	–	–
St. Lawrence	–	–	–	–	–	–	–	8	3	4	1	–	–
St. Stephen's	–	–	–	–	–	–	–	–	–	–	–	–	–
Syracuse	–	–	–	–	–	–	–	–	–	–	–	–	–
Union	5	2	2	1	.500	17	14	5	2	2	1	17	14
Vermont	–	–	–	–	–	–	–	–	–	–	–	–	–
Williams	10	6	4	0	.600	33	16	10	6	4	0	33	16
Yale	12	10	1	1	.875	47	9	17	15	1	1	64	12

== Schedule and results ==
Date	Opponent	Site	Result	Record
Regular season
January 19	St. Lawrence*	Beebe Lake • Ithaca, New York	L 0–1	0–1–0
January 26	at Williams*	Sage Hall Rink • Williamstown, Massachusetts	W 1–0	1–1–0
February 8 ^{†}	Colgate*	Beebe Lake • Ithaca, New York	W 3–1	2–1–0
February 16	Clarkson*	Beebe Lake • Ithaca, New York	L 2–5	2–2–0
February 23	at Colgate*	Freshman Football Field Rink • Hamilton, New York	L 1–2	2–3–0
*Non-conference game.

† Cornell records have the Colgate game being played on February 9 and the score as 3–2 in their favor.
