= 1928–29 Colby Mules men's ice hockey season =

- Conference: Independent
- Home ice: Colby Rink

Record
- Overall: 0–4–1
- Home: 0–2–0
- Road: 0–2–1

Coaches and captains
- Head coach: Eddie Roundy
- Assistant coaches: Bill Millett
- Captain: Sten Carlson

The 1928–29 Colby Mules men's ice hockey season was the 8th season of play for the program. The Mules represented Colby College and were coached by Eddie Roundy in his 5th season.

== Season ==
As the season began, the biggest issue for Colby's ice hockey team was the lack of experience. Only Bob Scott and team captain Sten Carlson were returning lettermen, though others like Irvine had played in a few games. After getting in as much practice as they could manage, the team opened the year against Bates and looked to have the measure of the Bobcats early. Lovett scored off of pass from Pollard while Scott managed to sing a long shot from rage to give the Mules a 2-goal lead after the first period. The Garnet slowly tilted the match in their favor getting a goal in each of the next to periods to force overtime. Bates were the aggressors in the extra sessions but Carlson and Pollard put up a defensive wall and kept all their attempts to the outside. After just two overtimes, the match was declared a draw. The game had a hard edge to it, with four 5-minute penalties being handed out amidst a slew of minor infractions.

When Bowdoin arrived in town the following week, the Mules were missing two of their starters to illness. Delaware replaced Scott at right wing while MacDougall took over for Pollard on defense. The team played well and even carried the play for much of the second period, but without Scott the offense could not find the back of the net. Both clubs appeared to tire in the third and game slowed down, much to the displeasure of the audience. The team was supposed to play rematches with both of their in-state rivals before the exams, however, the Irving and Delaware both became sick and the Mules didn't have enough players to ice a team. To their credit, Bates and Bowdoin allowed the games to be cancelled instead of forcing a forfeit.

After the exams, most of the players had recovered enough to return to the ice and embark on a three-game road trip. Unfortunately, warm weather reared its head and caused two of the matches to be cancelled. The only game Colby was able to play was at Massachusetts Agricultural. The Blue and Grey looked fast despite their long layoff, however, with Scott still out of the lineup the offense remained unable to score. Two goals from the home team were enough to send Colby back to Maine still searching for their first win of the season. Colby was home just long enough to collect Scott before heading out to face Bowdoin in the rematch. The teams were evenly matched throughout, though Bowdoin led for most of the game. Lovett finally ended the Mules goal drought at the start of the third and the game seemed destined for overtime. In the waning minutes, Bowdoin scored off of a faceoff but the referee had blown his whistle just before the puck crossed the line. Despite protestations from Colby, the goal was allowed to stand and Bowdoin was guaranteed to win the state championship.

A few days later, the rematch with Bates was held and nothing was out of place for two periods. Kenney's first of the season had the Mules tied with the Bobcats after 30 minutes and the two were set for a deciding third. In the opening minutes of the final frame, Carlson gave a hard check to Bates' Secor and knocked him off the puck. Secor took issue with the hit and gave a two-handed slash to the back of Carlson. The Colby captain spun around and punched Secor in the face, starting a bench-clearing brawl between all of the players. It took the combined efforts of the referee and all three coaches to break up the melee. Once the two sides had been cleared off of the ice, Bates refused to continue playing. The game was cancelled and, though the Bobcats had technically forfeited, the two sides later agreed to reclassify the game as an exhibition match and reschedule the game. Colby's rink was in good enough condition for the final game to be played at home, through the ice was far from perfect. Slow from the start, Carlson's first career goal evened the score in the opening period but the Garnet were looking for revenge. The Bates offense was far superior to Colby's in the game and scored twice more in spite of the questionable ice conditions. The Mules were unable to match the effort and ended the season without a win to their credit.

In mid-February, Colby College announced that they had purchased a plot of land next to College Avenue that contained the South End Arena. This move was necessary for the future of the ice hockey team as the on-campus rink had proved too difficult to maintain in warm or inclement weather.

Horace P. Maxcy served as team manager.

== Roster ==
| No. | Nat. | Player | Class | Pos | Height | Weight | DoB | Hometown | Previous team |
|---|---|---|---|---|---|---|---|---|---|
| | (United States) | J. Sten Carlson (C) | Senior | D | | | | Norwood, Massachusetts |
| | (United States) | Roland S. Delaware | Junior | RW | | | 1907-05-12 | Augusta, Maine |
| | (United States) | Rupert M. Irvine | Senior | G | | | 1907-06-08 | Caribou, Maine |
| | (United States) | Thomas J. Kenney | Sophomore | LW/RW | | | 1907-06-10 | Cambridge, Massachusetts |
| | (United States) | Walter B. Lovett | Sophomore | C | | | 1906-03-09 | Hudson, Maine |
| | (Canada) | Lorimer F. MacDougall | Junior | D | | | 1905-03-25 | Nova Scotia |
| | (United States) | John F. Pollard | Sophomore | D | | | 1907-08-17 | Fairfield, Maine |
| | (United States) | Rudolph J. F. Pomerleau | Senior | LW | | | 1907-08-22 | Waterville, Maine |
| | (United States) | Robert W. Scott | Senior | LW | | | | Wilton, Maine |

== Standings ==
1928–29 Eastern Collegiate ice hockey standings
| | Intercollegiate | | | | | | | Overall | | | | | |
| | GP | W | L | T | Pct. | GF | GA | GP | W | L | T | GF | GA |
|---|---|---|---|---|---|---|---|---|---|---|---|---|---|
| Amherst | 8 | 3 | 4 | 1 | .438 | 13 | 18 | 9 | 3 | 5 | 1 | 14 | 20 |
| Army | 9 | 2 | 7 | 0 | .222 | 11 | 50 | 12 | 3 | 9 | 0 | 23 | 61 |
| Bates | 11 | 4 | 6 | 1 | .409 | 26 | 20 | 12 | 5 | 6 | 1 | 28 | 21 |
| Boston College | 10 | 4 | 6 | 0 | .400 | 29 | 27 | 14 | 5 | 9 | 0 | 36 | 42 |
| Boston University | 10 | 9 | 1 | 0 | .900 | 36 | 9 | 12 | 9 | 2 | 1 | 39 | 14 |
| Bowdoin | 9 | 5 | 4 | 0 | .556 | 11 | 14 | 9 | 5 | 4 | 0 | 11 | 14 |
| Brown | – | – | – | – | – | – | – | 13 | 8 | 5 | 0 | – | – |
| Clarkson | 7 | 6 | 1 | 0 | .857 | 43 | 11 | 10 | 9 | 1 | 0 | 60 | 19 |
| Colby | 5 | 0 | 4 | 1 | .100 | 4 | 11 | 5 | 0 | 4 | 1 | 4 | 11 |
| Colgate | 7 | 4 | 3 | 0 | .571 | 16 | 18 | 7 | 4 | 3 | 0 | 16 | 18 |
| Connecticut Agricultural | – | – | – | – | – | – | – | – | – | – | – | – | – |
| Cornell | 5 | 2 | 3 | 0 | .400 | 7 | 9 | 5 | 2 | 3 | 0 | 7 | 9 |
| Dartmouth | – | – | – | – | – | – | – | 17 | 9 | 5 | 3 | 58 | 28 |
| Hamilton | – | – | – | – | – | – | – | 10 | 4 | 6 | 0 | – | – |
| Harvard | 7 | 4 | 3 | 0 | .571 | 26 | 10 | 10 | 5 | 4 | 1 | 31 | 15 |
| Massachusetts Agricultural | 11 | 6 | 5 | 0 | .545 | 30 | 20 | 12 | 7 | 5 | 0 | 33 | 21 |
| Middlebury | 10 | 7 | 3 | 0 | .700 | 27 | 29 | 10 | 7 | 3 | 0 | 27 | 29 |
| MIT | 11 | 5 | 6 | 0 | .455 | 26 | 32 | 11 | 5 | 6 | 0 | 26 | 32 |
| New Hampshire | 11 | 6 | 4 | 1 | .591 | 23 | 20 | 11 | 6 | 4 | 1 | 23 | 20 |
| Norwich | – | – | – | – | – | – | – | 8 | 2 | 6 | 0 | – | – |
| Pennsylvania | 11 | 2 | 9 | 0 | .182 | 12 | 82 | 13 | 2 | 10 | 1 | – | – |
| Princeton | – | – | – | – | – | – | – | 19 | 15 | 3 | 1 | – | – |
| Rensselaer | – | – | – | – | – | – | – | 4 | 1 | 3 | 0 | – | – |
| St. John's | – | – | – | – | – | – | – | 7 | 3 | 3 | 1 | – | – |
| St. Lawrence | – | – | – | – | – | – | – | 8 | 3 | 4 | 1 | – | – |
| St. Stephen's | – | – | – | – | – | – | – | – | – | – | – | – | – |
| Syracuse | – | – | – | – | – | – | – | – | – | – | – | – | – |
| Union | 5 | 2 | 2 | 1 | .500 | 17 | 14 | 5 | 2 | 2 | 1 | 17 | 14 |
| Vermont | – | – | – | – | – | – | – | – | – | – | – | – | – |
| Williams | 10 | 6 | 4 | 0 | .600 | 33 | 16 | 10 | 6 | 4 | 0 | 33 | 16 |
| Yale | 12 | 10 | 1 | 1 | .875 | 47 | 9 | 17 | 15 | 1 | 1 | 64 | 12 |

== Schedule and results ==
| Date | Opponent | Site | Result | Record |
Regular Season
| January 12 | at Bates* | Bartlett Street Rink • Lewiston, Maine | T 2–2 ^{2OT} | 0–0–1 |
| January 21 | Bowdoin* | South End Arena • Waterville, Maine | L 0–2 | 0–1–1 |
| February 8 | at Massachusetts Agricultural* | Campus Pond • Amherst, Massachusetts | L 0–2 | 0–2–1 |
| February 12 | at Bowdoin* | Delta Rink • Brunswick, Maine | L 1–2 | 0–3–1 |
| February 15 | Bates* | Bartlett Street Rink • Lewiston, Maine (exhibition) | T 1–1 ^{forfeit} | |
| February 20 | Bates* | South End Arena • Waterville, Maine | L 1–3 | 0–4–1 |
*Non-conference game.

== Scoring statistics ==
| Name | Position | Games | Goals | Assists | Points |
|---|---|---|---|---|---|
| Red Lovett | C | 5 | 2 | 0 | 2 |
| Snub Pollard | D | 4 | 0 | 2 | 2 |
| Bob Scott | LW | 3 | 1 | 0 | 1 |
| Sten Carlson | D | 5 | 1 | 0 | 1 |
| Laurie MacDougall | D | 2 | 0 | 0 | 0 |
| Roland Delaware | RW | 5 | 0 | 0 | 0 |
| Rupe Irvine | G | 5 | 0 | 0 | 0 |
| Tom Kenney | LW/RW | 5 | 0 | 0 | 0 |
| Rudolph Pomerleau | LW | 5 | 0 | 0 | 0 |
| Total | | | 4 | | |

Note: Primary assists were reported infrequently.
