= 1928–29 Amherst Lord Jeffs men's ice hockey season =

- Conference: Independent
- Home ice: Pratt Field

Record
- Overall: 3–5–1
- Home: 1–1–1
- Road: 2–4–0

Coaches and captains
- Head coach: Henry F. White
- Captain: Christopher Parnall

The 1928–29 Amherst Lord Jeffs men's ice hockey season was the 16th season of play for the program. The Lord Jeffs were coached by Henry White in his 3rd season.

== Season ==
For the first time in years, Amherst did not have to contend with poor weather throughout the winter months. However, the team did have to deal with the loss of two of their top players. With both their starting goaltender and primary scorer having graduated, the team would need new players to step up and fill in the gaps. The Lord Jeffs would be able to rely on the defensive tandem of Parnall and Perry to help ease into the season as well as a long runup to their season opener. Due to recent experiences with cancelling games, Amherst held a three-game exhibition series with Williams around New Year's but didn't schedule its first official game until the beginning of February. The club was able to use the extra several weeks of practice to get the new team up to speed.

The Jeffmen opened their season at home against New Hampshire with a defensive battle. Both sides had their changes but both Hanson and the opposing netminder stopped every shot. After four overtimes the game was called due to darkness. A few days later the team had its annual dustup with Massachusetts Agricultural and the match turned into a scoring bonanza. The cross-town rivals battered one another in the game, with several penalties being handed out to both squads, which only served to fuel the scoring. Team captain Parnall netted the first goal halfway through the opening period thanks to an error by the Aggie netminder. The Purple defense faltered, allowing the next two goals, but Patrick came to the rescue, scoring twice in a short span followed by a third Amherst goal to earn a two-goal edge at the end of two. The club got into penalty trouble in the third and surrendered two quick power play markers to see the score knotted at four. In the dying seconds of regulation, Nichols made a brilliant pass to Felt who fired the puck into the MAC net for the winning goal.

After their highest offensive output in years, Amherst traveled south to take on the vaunted Princeton team. The Tigers were one of the best teams in college hockey that year, entering the game with an undefeated record through eleven matches. The only hope for the Purples was for the defense to stem the tide of their speedy opponents, however, the Sabrinas were badly mauled. Despite the Princeton coach being unhappy with his team's performance, the Tigers skated rings around Amherst and barely allowed the Lord jeffs out of their own zone. Hanson did well to limit the damage only to 6 goals as Amherst received a solid thrashing. On their way back home, the team stopped off at West Point for a match with Army. They were able to get back on the right track with a close victory, again showing that the team had some offensive punch.

In the middle of February, Amherst renewed aggression with Williams, playing the first of two games at home. The Lord Jeffs' offense was largely ineffective throughout the match, with attack routinely being broken up by a sturdy Eph defense. Williams' forwards were equally as inept at scoring, however, the Ephs were able to get two goals from their defense to take a lead into the third. The Sabrinas increased their pressure in the third, desperately searching for goals. Around the middle of the period, Felt won a faceoff directly to Patrick who fired the puck into the cage. The team surged afterwards, within just a single marker of tying the match, but they were unable to overcome the visitors a second time. Amherst began its second road trip by heading to Rochester, falling to a local team 1–2. The following night, the team rebounded by downing Hamilton 3–1 in what was probably the team best overall performance of the year.

On their way back, the Jeffmen met Williams for a rematch and got into another heated scrap with the Ephs. Snow fell throughout the game but that didn't cool any tempers. Amherst attempted to batter the Ephs into submission but the home team gave as good as it got. A goal by Williams just 3 minutes into the match was the only tally, thanks to the stellar efforts of both goaltenders and poor teamwork of both offenses. The final game of the year came on the road versus Brown. The match was scoreless for most of the contest with both sides playing rather poorly. Patrick and Nichols had several chances to score on individual efforts but nothing materialized in the form of a score. Midway through the third, the Bears broke the tie and then held on to hand Amherst its second 0–1 defeat.

Chauncey S. Kibbe served as team manager with Robert W. Griffith as his assistant.

== Roster ==
No.	Nat.	Player	Class	Pos	Height	Weight	DoB	Hometown	Previous team
	(United States)	Geoffrey G. Felt	Senior	C/RW			1907-02-12	Melrose, Massachusetts
	(United States)	S. Charles Hanson	Junior	G				Easthampton, Massachusetts
	(United States)	Martin W. Kellogg	Senior				1905-07-02	West Hartford, Connecticut
	(United States)	Willard M. Kellogg	Junior	LW			1907-11-20	West Hartford, Connecticut
	(United States)	Albert J. Nichols	Junior	C				West Hartford, Connecticut
	(United States)	Christopher G. Parnall Jr. (C)	Senior	D			1909-09-21	Rochester, New York
	(United States)	Rowland V. Patrick	Senior	LW				West Newton, Massachusetts
	(United States)	Hubert L. Perry	Junior	D			1908-05-20	Buffalo, New York
	(United States)	Gordon P. Stearns	Sophomore	D			1908-12-24	Providence, Rhode Island
	(United States)	Robert H. Waterman	Junior					Providence, Rhode Island
	(United States)	Arthur S. Williams Jr.	Sophomore	RW			1907-07-23	Montclair, New Jersey

== Standings ==
1928–29 Eastern Collegiate ice hockey standings
	Intercollegiate							Overall					
	GP	W	L	T	Pct.	GF	GA	GP	W	L	T	GF	GA
Amherst	8	3	4	1	.438	13	18	9	3	5	1	14	20
Army	9	2	7	0	.222	11	50	12	3	9	0	23	61
Bates	11	4	6	1	.409	26	20	12	5	6	1	28	21
Boston College	10	4	6	0	.400	29	27	14	5	9	0	36	42
Boston University	10	9	1	0	.900	36	9	12	9	2	1	39	14
Bowdoin	9	5	4	0	.556	11	14	9	5	4	0	11	14
Brown	–	–	–	–	–	–	–	13	8	5	0	–	–
Clarkson	7	6	1	0	.857	43	11	10	9	1	0	60	19
Colby	5	0	4	1	.100	4	11	5	0	4	1	4	11
Colgate	7	4	3	0	.571	16	18	7	4	3	0	16	18
Connecticut Agricultural	–	–	–	–	–	–	–	–	–	–	–	–	–
Cornell	5	2	3	0	.400	7	9	5	2	3	0	7	9
Dartmouth	–	–	–	–	–	–	–	17	9	5	3	58	28
Hamilton	–	–	–	–	–	–	–	10	4	6	0	–	–
Harvard	7	4	3	0	.571	26	10	10	5	4	1	31	15
Massachusetts Agricultural	11	6	5	0	.545	30	20	12	7	5	0	33	21
Middlebury	10	7	3	0	.700	27	29	10	7	3	0	27	29
MIT	11	5	6	0	.455	26	32	11	5	6	0	26	32
New Hampshire	11	6	4	1	.591	23	20	11	6	4	1	23	20
Norwich	–	–	–	–	–	–	–	8	2	6	0	–	–
Pennsylvania	11	2	9	0	.182	12	82	13	2	10	1	–	–
Princeton	–	–	–	–	–	–	–	19	15	3	1	–	–
Rensselaer	–	–	–	–	–	–	–	4	1	3	0	–	–
St. John's	–	–	–	–	–	–	–	7	3	3	1	–	–
St. Lawrence	–	–	–	–	–	–	–	8	3	4	1	–	–
St. Stephen's	–	–	–	–	–	–	–	–	–	–	–	–	–
Syracuse	–	–	–	–	–	–	–	–	–	–	–	–	–
Union	5	2	2	1	.500	17	14	5	2	2	1	17	14
Vermont	–	–	–	–	–	–	–	–	–	–	–	–	–
Williams	10	6	4	0	.600	33	16	10	6	4	0	33	16
Yale	12	10	1	1	.875	47	9	17	15	1	1	64	12

== Schedule and results ==
Date	Opponent	Site	Result	Record
Exhibition
December 30	vs. Williams*	Lake Placid Rink • Lake Placid, New York (Exhibition)	L 3–5	
December 31	vs. Williams*	Lake Placid Rink • Lake Placid, New York (Exhibition)	W 2–1	
January 1	vs. Williams*	Lake Placid Rink • Lake Placid, New York (Exhibition)	L 1–4	
Regular Season
February 1	New Hampshire*	Pratt Field Rink • Amherst, Massachusetts	T 0–0 ^{4OT}	0–0–1
February 5	Massachusetts Agricultural*	Pratt Field Rink • Amherst, Massachusetts	W 5–4	1–0–1
February 8	at Princeton*	Hobey Baker Memorial Rink • Princeton, New Jersey	L 0–6	1–1–1
February 9	at Army*	Stuart Rink • West Point, New York	W 4–3	2–1–1
February 13	Williams*	Pratt Field Rink • Amherst, Massachusetts	L 1–2	2–2–1
February	at Rochester*	Rochester, New York	L 1–2	2–3–1
February	at Hamilton*	Russell Sage Rink • Clinton, New York	W 3–1	3–3–1
February 21	at Williams*	Sage Hall Rink • Williamstown, Massachusetts	L 0–1	3–4–1
February 26	at Brown*	Rhode Island Auditorium • Providence, Rhode Island	L 0–1	3–5–1
*Non-conference game.
