= 1928–29 Penn Quakers men's ice hockey season =

- Home ice: Philadelphia Ice Palace

Record
- Overall: 2–10–1
- Home: 2–7–0
- Road: 0–3–0
- Neutral: 0–0–1

Coaches and captains
- Head coach: Normand Shay; Percy Fynan
- Captain: Ed O'Reilly

The 1929–30 Penn Quakers men's ice hockey season was the 13th season of play for the program.

== Season ==
Penn revived its ice hockey program and announced the team's schedule in early December. With new coach Normand Shay, a former NHL player, in charge of the program, there was hope that the team could do well despite several years of inactivity. To entice the potential fans even more was the skill of the freshman team which was supposed to make the Quakers viable in the coming years. The sport was reinstituted on a provision basis, however, and would only survive if this season if the university's Council of Athletics agreed to continue the program.

The team opened its season on the 11th of December and, while their loss was unsurprising, the magnitude of the defeat was a bit hard to swallow. the team was walloped 12–0 and would need to improve quickly if they wanted to compete with their contemporaries. One of the biggest issues for the club was the lack of conditioning that saw them flag badly in the later half of each period. Unfortunately, the team had little time to get better before their next game and fell 3–19 to a very strong Princeton team. In spite of the lopsided score, Penn showed some life late by scoring their three goals in the later half of the match.

A rematch with the Tigers awaited the team after the Christmas break and coach Shay left his starting lineup unchanged. While the Quakers lost the rematch, they nearly halved the number of goals they allowed, demonstrating significant improvement during the previous month. The team had a short turnaround before the next game and welcomed Boston College to Philadelphia for the first meeting between the two programs. While Penn lost again, the margin of their defeats continued to fall and the improved play of goaltender Goodman held their opponents to 6 goals on 33 shots.

Continued improvement put Penn closer to their first win of the season and they were within striking distance of Brown for much of their next match. The following game came against possibly the best team in the country when Yale arrived to revive the programs' rivalry. Yale ended up winning the game in dominating fashion, though Penn was missing one of its regular defensemen in Oldham.

Nearing the halfway point of their season, the Quakers had yet to win a game. However, excluding the Yale game, the team had produced better results each game and were progressing well with the training they received from coach Shay. The final game before the team paused for semester examinations was against the Pennsylvania Athletic Club and led by former Quaker player and coach, George Orton. It would turn out to be the final game behind the bench for Shay as he was replaced by Percy Fynan. The first game under Fynan was a debacle as the team was solidly defeated 1–9 but the team was getting used to their new coach as well as a new lineup. Captain O'Reilly had been shifted to wing while new addition Jim Holland was installed at center. The Quakers weren't able to improve on their first meeting with BC, mainly due to a lack of teamwork.

Two more losses followed in which the Quakers couldn't manage a goal but then coach Fynan had time to teach his men a new system. When the Quakers entered the game against a mediocre MIT they knew it was probably their best chance to win all season. Penn took an early lead, but soon found themselves behind. Goodman held MIT back for the remainder of the game and allowed Penn to score twice more to earn their first victory of the year. The program had one final game to play and closed out the year with a 3–1 win over Rensselaer.

The success at the end of the year convinced the athletic department to bring the team back for the following year.

== Roster ==
No.	Nat.	Player	Class	Pos	Height	Weight	DoB	Hometown	Previous team
		Boggs
	(United States)	Al Goodman		G				West Hartford, Connecticut
		Ken Grant		D
		Harcourt
		Jim Holland		C
		LaGost		LW
	(Canada)	Norm Moseley		D/LW				Saint-Hyacinthe, Quebec
	(United States)	Ed O'Reilly (C)		C				Mount Vernon, New York
	(Canada)	Bill Oldham	Senior	D				Sarnia, Ontario
		Pie
		Red Pringle		LW
	(United States)	W. O. Smith		RW				Bryn Athyn, Pennsylvania
		Stocking
	(United States)	Herb Woods		D				Brighton, Massachusetts

== Standings ==
1928–29 Eastern Collegiate ice hockey standings
	Intercollegiate							Overall					
	GP	W	L	T	Pct.	GF	GA	GP	W	L	T	GF	GA
Amherst	8	3	4	1	.438	13	18	9	3	5	1	14	20
Army	9	2	7	0	.222	11	50	12	3	9	0	23	61
Bates	11	4	6	1	.409	26	20	12	5	6	1	28	21
Boston College	10	4	6	0	.400	29	27	14	5	9	0	36	42
Boston University	10	9	1	0	.900	36	9	12	9	2	1	39	14
Bowdoin	9	5	4	0	.556	11	14	9	5	4	0	11	14
Brown	–	–	–	–	–	–	–	13	8	5	0	–	–
Clarkson	7	6	1	0	.857	43	11	10	9	1	0	60	19
Colby	5	0	4	1	.100	4	11	5	0	4	1	4	11
Colgate	7	4	3	0	.571	16	18	7	4	3	0	16	18
Connecticut Agricultural	–	–	–	–	–	–	–	–	–	–	–	–	–
Cornell	5	2	3	0	.400	7	9	5	2	3	0	7	9
Dartmouth	–	–	–	–	–	–	–	17	9	5	3	58	28
Hamilton	–	–	–	–	–	–	–	10	4	6	0	–	–
Harvard	7	4	3	0	.571	26	10	10	5	4	1	31	15
Massachusetts Agricultural	11	6	5	0	.545	30	20	12	7	5	0	33	21
Middlebury	10	7	3	0	.700	27	29	10	7	3	0	27	29
MIT	11	5	6	0	.455	26	32	11	5	6	0	26	32
New Hampshire	11	6	4	1	.591	23	20	11	6	4	1	23	20
Norwich	–	–	–	–	–	–	–	8	2	6	0	–	–
Pennsylvania	11	2	9	0	.182	12	82	13	2	10	1	–	–
Princeton	–	–	–	–	–	–	–	19	15	3	1	–	–
Rensselaer	–	–	–	–	–	–	–	4	1	3	0	–	–
St. John's	–	–	–	–	–	–	–	7	3	3	1	–	–
St. Lawrence	–	–	–	–	–	–	–	8	3	4	1	–	–
St. Stephen's	–	–	–	–	–	–	–	–	–	–	–	–	–
Syracuse	–	–	–	–	–	–	–	–	–	–	–	–	–
Union	5	2	2	1	.500	17	14	5	2	2	1	17	14
Vermont	–	–	–	–	–	–	–	–	–	–	–	–	–
Williams	10	6	4	0	.600	33	16	10	6	4	0	33	16
Yale	12	10	1	1	.875	47	9	17	15	1	1	64	12

== Schedule and results ==
Date	Opponent	Site	Result	Record
Regular Season
December 11	St. Nicholas Athletic Club*	Philadelphia Ice Palace • Philadelphia, Pennsylvania	L 0–12	0–1–0
December 15	Princeton*	Philadelphia Ice Palace • Philadelphia, Pennsylvania	L 3–19	0–2–0
January 9 ^{†}	at Princeton*	Hobey Baker Memorial Rink • Princeton, New Jersey	L 0–10	0–3–0
January 11	Boston College*	Philadelphia Ice Palace • Philadelphia, Pennsylvania	L 0–6	0–4–0
January 17	Brown*	Philadelphia Ice Palace • Philadelphia, Pennsylvania	L 1–4	0–5–0
January 22	Yale*	Philadelphia Ice Palace • Philadelphia, Pennsylvania	L 0–12	0–6–0
January 25	vs. Philadelphia Athletic Club*	Philadelphia Ice Palace • Philadelphia, Pennsylvania	T ?	0–6–1
February 8	at Williams*	Philadelphia Ice Palace • Philadelphia, Pennsylvania	L 1–9	0–7–1
February 15	at Boston College*	Boston Arena • Boston, Massachusetts	L 1–6	0–8–1
February 16	at Brown*	Rhode Island Auditorium • Providence, Rhode Island	L 0–4	0–9–1
February 22	Harvard*	Philadelphia Ice Palace • Philadelphia, Pennsylvania	L 0–9	0–10–1
March 3	MIT*	Philadelphia Ice Palace • Philadelphia, Pennsylvania	W 3–2	1–10–1
March 9	Rensselaer*	Philadelphia Ice Palace • Philadelphia, Pennsylvania	W 3–1	2–10–1
*Non-conference game.

† Most records erroneously have the game recorded as being played on January 10, when it was originally scheduled to be held.
