= 1928–29 Harvard Crimson men's ice hockey season =

College ice hockey season

- Conference: Independent
- Home ice: Boston Garden

Record
- Overall: 5–4–1
- Home: 3–0–1
- Road: 1–3–0
- Neutral: 1–1–0

Coaches and captains
- Head coach: Joseph Stubbs
- Captain: John Tudor

The 1928–29 Harvard Crimson men's ice hockey season was the 31st season of play for the program.

== Season ==
Before the season began a major change had to be undertaken; the Boston Madison Square Garden, the new indoor facility for the Boston Bruins, was going to serve as the new home for Harvard hockey, but due to a lack of ice, the team would have to travel south to use the New York Madison Square Garden for practices. Tex Rickard controlled both buildings and he was willing to let Harvard have access to either. There was also a change of university policy for the team as it was now able to play more than two away games per season.

The team opened their season with a pair of solid wins and then lost their two-game series against Toronto. Despite the loss, Harvard had pushed the Blues into overtime in both games and looked to be as strong as they were the year before. The second game only ended in a scoreless tie due to Toronto's captain throwing his stick to knock the puck off of a Crimson stick (not a penalty at the time). Harvard's championship hopes were dealt a serious blow when they lost the first game of their collegiate season on Dartmouth's new rink and then had to wait over a month before their next game.

The Crimson were able to exact some revenge in the rematch against the Indians but they had little margin for error after an easy tilt against Pennsylvania. They entered the series against Yale with their foes having gone undefeated to that point (13–0–1) but Harvard could still spoil the Eli's season. In front of 12,000 spectators at the Garden, Harvard ground out a 2–1 overtime win in a penalty-filled game. The rematch came a week later and once again the home team won, unfortunately that team was Yale. Harvard was held scoreless throughout the game but the defense remained stout and only surrendered a single goal in the third period. The final game, which would decide whether or not Yale could claim a championship, was played at Yale on 13 March and the two teams proved to be the equal of the other once more. While Yale appeared to be the better team at times during the game they would not distance themselves from the Crimson and the two teams finished regulation tied at 2-all. Overtime was needed but after a scoreless 10-minutes another was required. Neither team was able to end the game by the 80th minute so a third extra session was yet required. With both teams visible exhausted Frank Nelson was finally able to score the deciding goal, he just happened to be wearing an Eli sweater.

While Harvard finished with a less-than-satisfying result and their record was rather poor, the Crimson had played tremendously well through most of the year, they just couldn't get luck to side in their favor in 1929.

== Roster ==
No.	Nat.	Player	Class	Pos	Height	Weight	DoB	Hometown	Previous team
		S. L. Batchelder	Sophomore	D
		Albert S. Bigelow	Senior	D
		Hugh W. Bigelow	Senior	D
		Covel		D
		John Cross	Junior	LW
		William L. Elkins	Senior	G
		Horace D. Everett	Sophomore	C/LW
	(United States)	John B. Garrison	Sophomore	C			1909-02-13	West Newton, Massachusetts
		Rene F. G. Giddens	Junior	RW
		Guy C. Holbrook Jr.	Junior	C
		Orton P. Jackson	Senior	G
		Charles B. Lakin	Junior	RW
		B. Henry Newell	Senior	G
		Pruyn		RW
		Eliot T. Putnam	Senior	C/D
		Shearor		D
		Malcolm N. Stanley	Senior	LW/D
		John Tudor (C)	Senior	LW
		Watts		LW

== Standings ==
1928–29 Eastern Collegiate ice hockey standings
	Intercollegiate							Overall					
	GP	W	L	T	Pct.	GF	GA	GP	W	L	T	GF	GA
Amherst	8	3	4	1	.438	13	18	9	3	5	1	14	20
Army	9	2	7	0	.222	11	50	12	3	9	0	23	61
Bates	11	4	6	1	.409	26	20	12	5	6	1	28	21
Boston College	10	4	6	0	.400	29	27	14	5	9	0	36	42
Boston University	10	9	1	0	.900	36	9	12	9	2	1	39	14
Bowdoin	9	5	4	0	.556	11	14	9	5	4	0	11	14
Brown	–	–	–	–	–	–	–	13	8	5	0	–	–
Clarkson	7	6	1	0	.857	43	11	10	9	1	0	60	19
Colby	5	0	4	1	.100	4	11	5	0	4	1	4	11
Colgate	7	4	3	0	.571	16	18	7	4	3	0	16	18
Connecticut Agricultural	–	–	–	–	–	–	–	–	–	–	–	–	–
Cornell	5	2	3	0	.400	7	9	5	2	3	0	7	9
Dartmouth	–	–	–	–	–	–	–	17	9	5	3	58	28
Hamilton	–	–	–	–	–	–	–	10	4	6	0	–	–
Harvard	7	4	3	0	.571	26	10	10	5	4	1	31	15
Massachusetts Agricultural	11	6	5	0	.545	30	20	12	7	5	0	33	21
Middlebury	10	7	3	0	.700	27	29	10	7	3	0	27	29
MIT	11	5	6	0	.455	26	32	11	5	6	0	26	32
New Hampshire	11	6	4	1	.591	23	20	11	6	4	1	23	20
Norwich	–	–	–	–	–	–	–	8	2	6	0	–	–
Pennsylvania	11	2	9	0	.182	12	82	13	2	10	1	–	–
Princeton	–	–	–	–	–	–	–	19	15	3	1	–	–
Rensselaer	–	–	–	–	–	–	–	4	1	3	0	–	–
St. John's	–	–	–	–	–	–	–	7	3	3	1	–	–
St. Lawrence	–	–	–	–	–	–	–	8	3	4	1	–	–
St. Stephen's	–	–	–	–	–	–	–	–	–	–	–	–	–
Syracuse	–	–	–	–	–	–	–	–	–	–	–	–	–
Union	5	2	2	1	.500	17	14	5	2	2	1	17	14
Vermont	–	–	–	–	–	–	–	–	–	–	–	–	–
Williams	10	6	4	0	.600	33	16	10	6	4	0	33	16
Yale	12	10	1	1	.875	47	9	17	15	1	1	64	12

== Schedule and results ==
Date	Opponent	Site	Result	Record
Regular Season
December 12	vs. MIT*	Boston Garden • Boston, Massachusetts	W 9–1	1–0–0
December 21	McGill*	Boston Garden • Boston, Massachusetts	W 3–2 ^{OT}	3–1–0
December 31	vs. Toronto*	Madison Square Garden • Manhattan, New York	L 2–3 ^{OT}	2–1–0
January 3	Toronto*	Boston Garden • Boston, Massachusetts	T 0–0 ^{OT}	2–1–1
January 12	at Dartmouth*	Davis Rink • Hanover, New Hampshire	L 1–2	2–2–1
February 16	Dartmouth*	Boston Garden • Boston, Massachusetts	W 3–2	3–2–1
February 22	at Pennsylvania*	Philadelphia Ice Palace • Philadelphia, Pennsylvania	W 9–0	4–2–1
March 2	Yale*	Boston Garden • Boston, Massachusetts (Rivalry)	W 2–1	5–2–1
March 9	at Yale*	New Haven Arena • New Haven, Connecticut (Rivalry)	L 0–1	5–3–1
March 13	at Yale*	New Haven Arena • New Haven, Connecticut (Rivalry)	L 2–3 ^{3OT}	5–4–1
*Non-conference game.
