= Samuel Guarnaccia =

American football coach (1908–2001)

Biographical details
- Born: October 1, 1908; Wakefield, Massachusetts, U.S.
- Died: July 27, 2001 (aged 92); Weybridge, Vermont, U.S.

Coaching career (HC unless noted)
- 1942: Middlebury

Head coaching record
- Overall: 0–8

Samuel Guarnaccia (October 1, 1908 – July 27, 2001) was an American professor and college football coach. He served as the head football coach at Middlebury College in Middlebury, Vermont for one season, in 1942, compiling a record of 0–8. He also taught Spanish and Italian at Middlebury until 1968.

Guarnaccia was born on October 1, 1908, in Wakefield, Massachusetts. He attended Wakefield High School and graduated from Middlebury in 1930. He taught at Cheshire Academy in Cheshire, Connecticut and New York Military Academy in Cornwall, New York during the 1930s. During World War II, Guarnaccia served as a United States Navy lieutenant in Cuba and Naples. He died on July 27, 2001, at his home in Weybridge, Vermont.

== Head coaching record ==
Year	Team	Overall	Conference	Standing	Bowl/playoffs
Middlebury Panthers (Independent) (1942)
1942	Middlebury	0–8			
Middlebury:		0–8			
Total:		0–8			
