= 1928–29 United States collegiate men's ice hockey season =

- Duration: December 1928– March 1929
- East Collegiate champion: Yale
- West Collegiate champion: Minnesota

The 1928–29 United States collegiate men's ice hockey season was the 35th season of collegiate ice hockey in the United States.

== Regular season ==
=== Standings ===
1928–29 Eastern Collegiate ice hockey standings
| | Intercollegiate | | | | | | | Overall | | | | | |
| | GP | W | L | T | Pct. | GF | GA | GP | W | L | T | GF | GA |
|---|---|---|---|---|---|---|---|---|---|---|---|---|---|
| Amherst | 8 | 3 | 4 | 1 | .438 | 13 | 18 | 9 | 3 | 5 | 1 | 14 | 20 |
| Army | 9 | 2 | 7 | 0 | .222 | 11 | 50 | 12 | 3 | 9 | 0 | 23 | 61 |
| Bates | 11 | 4 | 6 | 1 | .409 | 26 | 20 | 12 | 5 | 6 | 1 | 28 | 21 |
| Boston College | 10 | 4 | 6 | 0 | .400 | 29 | 27 | 14 | 5 | 9 | 0 | 36 | 42 |
| Boston University | 10 | 9 | 1 | 0 | .900 | 36 | 9 | 12 | 9 | 2 | 1 | 39 | 14 |
| Bowdoin | 9 | 5 | 4 | 0 | .556 | 11 | 14 | 9 | 5 | 4 | 0 | 11 | 14 |
| Brown | – | – | – | – | – | – | – | 13 | 8 | 5 | 0 | – | – |
| Clarkson | 7 | 6 | 1 | 0 | .857 | 43 | 11 | 10 | 9 | 1 | 0 | 60 | 19 |
| Colby | 5 | 0 | 4 | 1 | .100 | 4 | 11 | 5 | 0 | 4 | 1 | 4 | 11 |
| Colgate | 7 | 4 | 3 | 0 | .571 | 16 | 18 | 7 | 4 | 3 | 0 | 16 | 18 |
| Connecticut Agricultural | – | – | – | – | – | – | – | – | – | – | – | – | – |
| Cornell | 5 | 2 | 3 | 0 | .400 | 7 | 9 | 5 | 2 | 3 | 0 | 7 | 9 |
| Dartmouth | – | – | – | – | – | – | – | 17 | 9 | 5 | 3 | 58 | 28 |
| Hamilton | – | – | – | – | – | – | – | 10 | 4 | 6 | 0 | – | – |
| Harvard | 7 | 4 | 3 | 0 | .571 | 26 | 10 | 10 | 5 | 4 | 1 | 31 | 15 |
| Massachusetts Agricultural | 11 | 6 | 5 | 0 | .545 | 30 | 20 | 12 | 7 | 5 | 0 | 33 | 21 |
| Middlebury | 10 | 7 | 3 | 0 | .700 | 27 | 29 | 10 | 7 | 3 | 0 | 27 | 29 |
| MIT | 11 | 5 | 6 | 0 | .455 | 26 | 32 | 11 | 5 | 6 | 0 | 26 | 32 |
| New Hampshire | 11 | 6 | 4 | 1 | .591 | 23 | 20 | 11 | 6 | 4 | 1 | 23 | 20 |
| Norwich | – | – | – | – | – | – | – | 8 | 2 | 6 | 0 | – | – |
| Pennsylvania | 11 | 2 | 9 | 0 | .182 | 12 | 82 | 13 | 2 | 10 | 1 | – | – |
| Princeton | – | – | – | – | – | – | – | 19 | 15 | 3 | 1 | – | – |
| Rensselaer | – | – | – | – | – | – | – | 4 | 1 | 3 | 0 | – | – |
| St. John's | – | – | – | – | – | – | – | 7 | 3 | 3 | 1 | – | – |
| St. Lawrence | – | – | – | – | – | – | – | 8 | 3 | 4 | 1 | – | – |
| St. Stephen's | – | – | – | – | – | – | – | – | – | – | – | – | – |
| Syracuse | – | – | – | – | – | – | – | – | – | – | – | – | – |
| Union | 5 | 2 | 2 | 1 | .500 | 17 | 14 | 5 | 2 | 2 | 1 | 17 | 14 |
| Vermont | – | – | – | – | – | – | – | – | – | – | – | – | – |
| Williams | 10 | 6 | 4 | 0 | .600 | 33 | 16 | 10 | 6 | 4 | 0 | 33 | 16 |
| Yale | 12 | 10 | 1 | 1 | .875 | 47 | 9 | 17 | 15 | 1 | 1 | 64 | 12 |

1928–29 Western Collegiate ice hockey standings
| | Intercollegiate | | | | | | | Overall | | | | | |
| | GP | W | L | T | Pct. | GF | GA | GP | W | L | T | GF | GA |
|---|---|---|---|---|---|---|---|---|---|---|---|---|---|
| California | – | – | – | – | – | – | – | – | – | – | – | – | – |
| Loyola | – | – | – | – | – | – | – | – | – | – | – | – | – |
| Marquette | 11 | 7 | 4 | 0 | .636 | 70 | 17 | 14 | 9 | 5 | 0 | 85 | 20 |
| Michigan | 14 | 4 | 9 | 1 | .321 | 34 | 65 | 17 | 5 | 11 | 1 | 46 | 74 |
| Michigan State | 2 | 0 | 2 | 0 | .000 | 3 | 17 | 7 | 3 | 3 | 1 | 23 | 19 |
| Michigan Tech | 8 | 1 | 4 | 3 | .313 | 13 | 18 | 13 | 2 | 8 | 3 | 16 | 35 |
| Minnesota | 15 | 13 | 2 | 0 | .867 | 57 | 12 | 17 | 14 | 2 | 1 | 62 | 13 |
| North Dakota Agricultural | – | – | – | – | – | – | – | – | – | – | – | – | – |
| Wisconsin | 13 | 5 | 6 | 2 | .462 | 24 | 33 | 20 | 11 | 7 | 2 | 42 | 39 |
| UCLA | 3 | 0 | 3 | 0 | .000 | 5 | 14 | 3 | 0 | 3 | 0 | 5 | 14 |
| USC | – | – | – | – | – | – | – | – | – | – | – | – | – |

1928–29 Minnesota Intercollegiate Athletic Conference ice hockey standings
| | Conference | | | | | | | Overall | | | | | |
| | GP | W | L | T | PTS | GF | GA | GP | W | L | T | GF | GA |
|---|---|---|---|---|---|---|---|---|---|---|---|---|---|
| Saint Mary's † | – | – | – | – | – | – | – | 14 | 11 | 2 | 1 | – | – |
| Augsburg | – | – | – | – | – | – | – | – | – | – | – | – | – |
| Concordia | – | – | – | – | – | – | – | 2 | 0 | 2 | 0 | – | – |
| Hamline | – | – | – | – | – | – | – | – | – | – | – | – | – |
| Macalester | – | – | – | – | – | – | – | – | – | – | – | – | – |
| St. Thomas | – | – | – | – | – | – | – | 11 | 6 | 5 | 0 | – | – |
† indicates conference champion

== Awards ==
All-American Team
| Player | Team | Position |
|---|---|---|
| Morrill Bott | Dartmouth | G |
| Fred Dion | Clarkson | D |
| John Jones | Princeton | D |
| Don McFadyen | Marquette | C |
| Rene Giddens | Harvard | RW |
| Ding Palmer | Yale | LW |
| Charles McCabe | Minnesota | Spare |
