= Norwood Lake =

- Location within New York Norwood Lake (the United States)
- Location: St. Lawrence County, New York, United States
- Coordinates: 44°39′30″N 74°59′27″W
- Type: Reservoir
- Primary inflows: Raquette River
- Primary outflows: Raquette River
- Basin countries: United States
- Surface area: 352 acres (1.42 km^{2})
- Average depth: 8 feet (2.4 m)
- Max. depth: 25 feet (7.6 m)
- Shore length^{1}: 3 miles (4.8 km)
- Surface elevation: 404 feet (123 m)
- Islands: 1
- Settlements: Norwood, New York
- ^{1} Shore length is not a well-defined measure.

Norwood Lake is a man-made lake located by Norwood, New York. Fish species present in the reservoir are smallmouth bass, northern pike, rock bass, yellow perch, and walleye. There is a carry down boat launch located on Riverside Road.
