= UNH Ice Rink =

Ice rink in Durham, New Hampshire

Coordinates: 43.1388°N 70.9328°W

- Interactive map of UNH Ice Rink
- Location: 124 Main St. Durham, New Hampshire, USA, 03824
- Owner: University of New Hampshire
- Operator: University of New Hampshire

Construction
- Opened: January 1926
- Closed: February 1955
- Demolished: yes

Tenant
- New Hampshire Wildcats men's ice hockey

The UNH Ice Rink was the first ice surface operated by the University of New Hampshire for its ice hockey program. The facility was a temporary, open-air ice rink that was subject to weather conditions and could only be used for part of the year.

== History ==
In 1924, football coach Hank Swasey announced the formation of an ice hockey team for UNH that would begin play that year. That team played just 4 games but, without a home venue, were forced to travel for each match. The following year, plans for an on-campus rink were finalized and the UNH Ice Rink was erected behind New Hampshire Hall on Main street. The Wildcats were able to use their rink more often than most due to their typically cold winters, however, they were affected by adverse weather conditions like snow and rain that could render the ice surface unusable. In order to protect the rink, it was moved to Lewis Field on the opposite side of Main street in 1939 to help protect it from inclement weather. Despite these issues, the ice hockey team continued to call the Rink home for nearly 30 years. It wasn't until a series of warm winter in the late 1940s that plans were put in place for a more suitable home for the program. In the mid-50s, alumnus Harry C. Batchelder donated equipment to build the first artificial rink for the program. The new rink was completed in February 1955, allowing the UNH Ice Rink to be taken down for the last time.
