= 1922–23 Bowdoin Polar Bears men's ice hockey season =

- Conference: Independent
- Home ice: Delta Rink

Record
- Overall: 5–4–0
- Home: 3–3–0
- Road: 2–1–0

Coaches and captains
- Head coach: Allen Morrell
- Captain: Arthur Miguel

The 1922–23 Bowdoin Polar Bears men's ice hockey season was the 4th season of play for the program.

== Season ==
Bowdoin entered the year with several changes to the program. Aside from the normal roster turnover from graduation, Al Morrell, who was graduating after the fall term, stepped down as coach and turned the team over to Jack Magee. While Morrell was unlikely to play as his studies took priority, Harold Stonemetz was academically ineligible for at least the first half of the season and the team would have to rely even more heavily on untested additions. Practice began after Thanksgiving and was conducted in the gymnasium while the team waited for the Delta Rink to be rebuilt. Bowdoin got several weeks of practice in before the first game and appeared to have put together a stronger unit that years past. Young, centering Bucknam and Bowker, made up an entirely new offensive unit but, with how poor the team had fared over the past two seasons, that wasn't necessarily a bad thing. Miguel was moved out of the goal to defense while Nichols, who had played well in one game between the pipes, took over the Bowdoin crease.

Renewed hopes were tested in the opening match against an independent aggregation from Lewiston and, at the start, everything looked good. Young opened the scoring early in the first period while Bowker doubled the lead at the start of the second. Lewiston fought back in the third and scored twice to tie the game. A 5-minute overtime was needed to settle the score and, unfortunately, the final goal came from a visitor. Despite the loss, the team had played well and there was belief that they could give Bates a fight when the Polar Bears started the state series. Miguel was back in goal for the game while Bowker moved back to defense and Needham took over at wing. The Garnet weren't impressed by Bowdoin or the lineup changes and hammered the home team 1–12. The visitors used a bevy of alternates in the match, allowing them to remain fresh through the contest, while Bowdoin's only substitute was Nichols. Widen caged the only goal for the Whites but that was an afterthought in the otherwise embarrassing defeat that saw the team outshot 6–47. With fears of a terrible season looming, Nichols returned to the crease while Miguel jumped up to take over at center. Bowker, Bucknam and Young rotated at wing while Al Morrell made a surprising appearance on defense. He brought his elder brother Malcolm with him and the two teamed with Widen to help lead Bowdoin to its first win on the season. In spite of poor ice, Bucknam gave Bowdoin an early lead with his second of the season. After the Mules tied the score, Morrell responded quickly with a score off the rush. Young replaced Bucknam in the third and promptly doubled the Bears' advantage. Colby was able to score late in the match but could not get the equalizer. Shortly before the game, the athletic council confirmed the appointment of Al Morrell as head coach of the team.

After returning from the exam break, the Polar Bears changed their lineup once more. Al Morrell, now ineligible due to graduation, was replaced by Preble in the latter's first appearance of the season. Another returnee, Plaisted, assumed the starting job at center. Miguel returned to the crease while Nichols served as a reserve center while Cutter was added at wing. The new-look team faced an amateur club from Cabot Mills and eviscerated their opponents 14–2. After scoring 2 goals in the first, Plainsted was replaced by Nichols and the sometime-goaltender scored six consecutive goals in one of the most stunning performances ever seen from a Bowdoin skater. With the score so lopsided, coach Morrell was able to use three full contingent in the game and give many new players their first taste of game action. Cabot's two goals came in the final frame after the third team had hit the ice but that didn't affect the outcome. The next was a much closer affair when Bowdoin took on Maine at home. The two battled in a close match for two periods but the Polar Bears were able to pull away in the final period with 4 unanswered goals. the starting forwards Cutter, Plaisted and Bucknam each scored twice in the match.

As the season was soon to end, the team crammed as many games as they could into the last few weeks. After avenging their earlier loss to the Lewiston Independents, Bowdoin fell in the rematch with Colby. The loss was a result of overconfidence on the part of the Bears with the Mules taking several turnovers the length of the ice for scores in the final period. The loss made it nigh-impossible for Bowdoin to win the state championship as Bates would have to lose the three remaining games on their schedule to fall behind the Whites. The rematch with the Garnet, which was moved to Auburn for the Winter Carnival, was much closer than the first meeting between the two. Miguel and Plaisted teamed up on defense to keep the power Bates offense at bay while Widen switched off with Cronin at center. Even on the blueline, Plaisted found time to score the Bears' goal that tied the score. The teams seemed destined for overtime but two quick goals before the end of the third gave Bates the win. The disheartened team seemed lost at the start of the rematch with Maine. After finding themselves down by 3 after the first period, Bucknam sparked a comeback in the second and Bowdoin scored four times in the middle frame. The defense held in the third to give the Polar Bears a win and its first winning season.

Alfred Stone served as team manager.

== Roster ==
No.	Nat.	Player	Class	Pos	Height	Weight	DoB	Hometown	Previous team
	(United States)	Everett M. Bowker	Sophomore	D/W			1901-09-17	Brookline, Massachusetts
	(United States)	Gordon Bucknam	Freshman	LW/RW			1904-09-15	Newton, Massachusetts
	(United States)	John W. Cronin	Sophomore	C/RW			1905-02-10	Lewiston, Maine
	(United States)	Charles N. Cutter	Freshman	LW			1904-03-05	Somerville, Massachusetts
	(United States)	William D. Littlefield	Junior	D			1899-04-23	Berwick, Maine
	(United States)	Arthur J. D. Miguel (C)	Junior	G/D/F			1901-08-29	Cambridge, Massachusetts
	(United States)	Allen E. Morrell	Senior	D			1897-07-07	Hyde Park, Massachusetts
	(United States)	Malcolm E. Morrell	Junior	D			1895-01-28	Boston, Massachusetts
	(United States)	Allen K. Needham	Junior	LW			1902-10-13	Manchester, Massachusetts
	(United States)	Barrett C. Nichols	Sophomore	G/D/F			1901-12-14	Boston, Massachusetts
	(United States)	Frank H. Plaisted	Junior	D/C			1900-09-18	Salt Lake City, Utah
	(United States)	Howard B. Preble	Sophomore	D			1904-07-10	Everett, Massachusetts
	(United States)	Albert W. Tolman Jr.	Sophomore	G			1904-06-08	Portland, Maine
	(United States)	William Widen	Freshman	D/C			1902-12-09	Boston, Massachusetts
	(United States)	Douglas W. Young	Junior	C/RW			1903-12-04	Boston, Massachusetts

== Standings ==
1922–23 Eastern Collegiate ice hockey standings
	Intercollegiate							Overall					
	GP	W	L	T	Pct.	GF	GA	GP	W	L	T	GF	GA
Amherst	8	4	3	1	.563	15	24	8	4	3	1	15	24
Army	11	5	6	0	.455	26	35	14	7	7	0	36	39
Bates	9	6	3	0	.667	34	25	12	8	4	0	56	32
Boston College	5	5	0	0	1.000	30	6	14	12	1	1	53	18
Boston University	7	2	5	0	.286	21	22	8	2	6	0	22	26
Bowdoin	6	3	3	0	.500	18	28	9	5	4	0	37	33
Clarkson	3	1	1	1	.500	3	14	6	2	3	1	18	28
Colby	6	2	4	0	.333	15	21	6	2	4	0	15	21
Columbia	9	0	9	0	.000	14	35	9	0	9	0	14	35
Cornell	6	1	3	2	.333	6	16	6	1	3	2	6	16
Dartmouth	12	10	2	0	.833	49	20	15	13	2	0	67	26
Hamilton	7	2	5	0	.286	20	34	10	4	6	0	37	53
Harvard	10	7	3	0	.700	27	11	12	8	4	0	34	19
Maine	6	2	4	0	.333	16	23	6	2	4	0	16	23
Massachusetts Agricultural	9	3	4	2	.444	13	24	9	3	4	2	13	24
Middlebury	3	0	3	0	.000	1	6	3	0	3	0	1	6
MIT	8	3	5	0	.375	16	52	8	3	5	0	16	52
Pennsylvania	6	1	4	1	.250	8	36	7	2	4	1	11	38
Princeton	15	11	4	0	.733	84	21	18	12	5	1	93	30
Rensselaer	5	1	4	0	.200	6	23	5	1	4	0	6	23
Saint Michael's	3	1	2	0	.333	4	5	–	–	–	–	–	–
Union	0	0	0	0	–	0	0	3	2	1	0	–	–
Williams	9	5	3	1	.611	33	17	10	6	3	1	40	17
Yale	13	9	4	0	.692	70	16	15	9	6	0	75	26

== Schedule and results ==
Date	Opponent	Site	Result	Record
Regular Season
January 13	Lewiston Independents*	Delta Rink • Brunswick, Maine	L 2–3 ^{OT}	0–1–0
January 17	Bates*	Delta Rink • Brunswick, Maine	L 1–12	0–2–0
January 20	at Colby*	South End Arena • Waterville, Maine	W 3–2	1–2–0
February 8	Cabot Mills*	Delta Rink • Brunswick, Maine	W 14–2	2–2–0
February 17	Maine*	Delta Rink • Brunswick, Maine	W 7–2	3–2–0
February 19	Lewiston Independents*	Delta Rink • Brunswick, Maine	W 3–0	4–2–0
February 21	Colby*	Delta Rink • Brunswick, Maine	L 2–6	4–3–0
February 22	vs. Colby*	Auburn Rink • Auburn, Maine	L 1–3	4–4–0
February 24	at Maine*	Alumni Field Rink • Orono, Maine	W 4–3	5–4–0
*Non-conference game.
