= 1922–23 Williams Ephs men's ice hockey season =

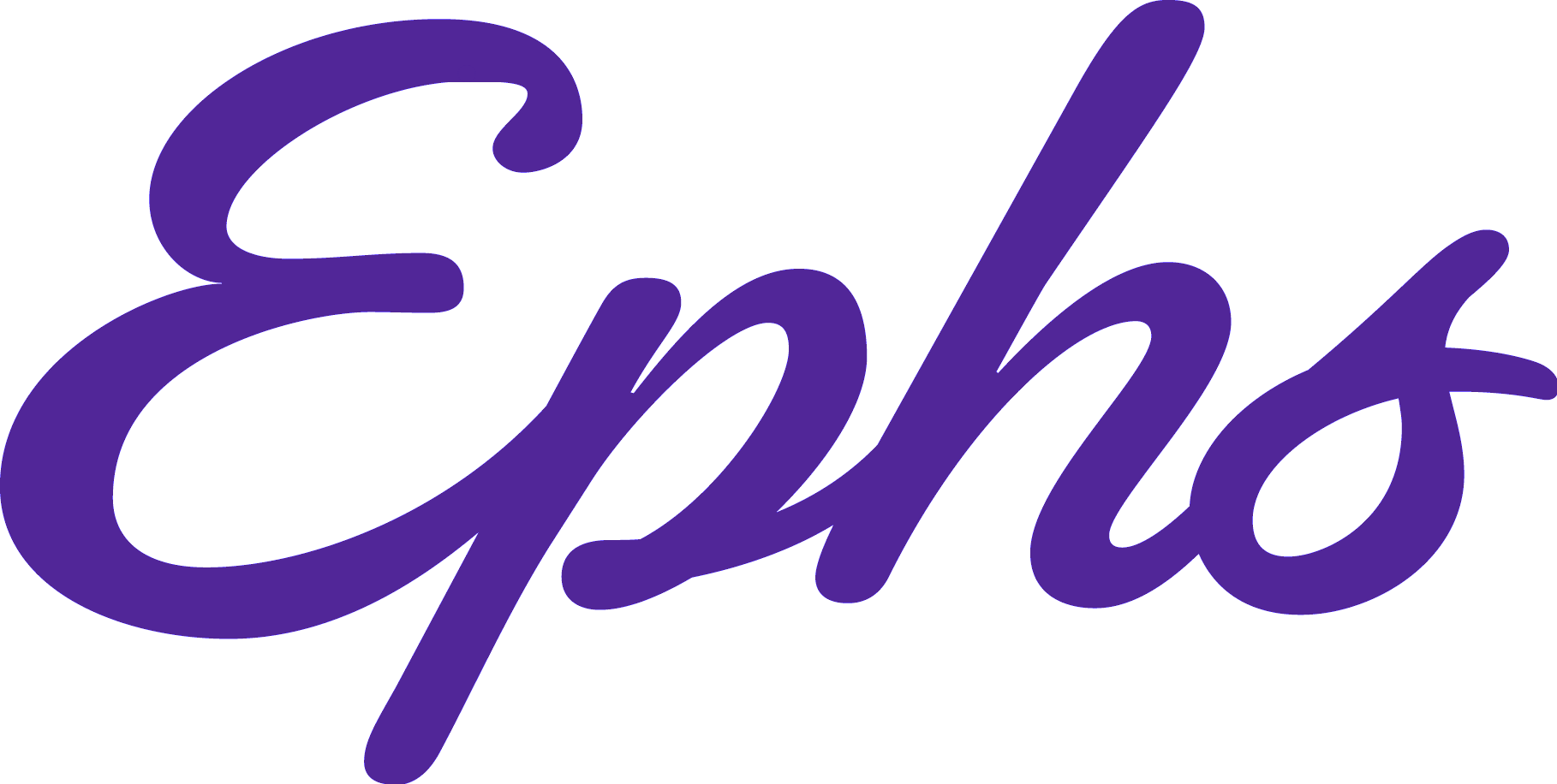
- Conference: Independent
- Home ice: Weston Field Rink

Record
- Overall: 6–3–1
- Home: 1–2–0
- Road: 5–1–1
- Neutral: 0–1–0

Coaches and captains
- Head coach: Russell Barkell
- Captain: William Stephenson

The 1922–23 Williams Ephs men's ice hockey season was the 20th season of play for the program.

== Season ==
For its 20th year of varsity ice hockey, Williams College finally hired a head coach for the program. Russell Barkell, a star player for Michigan during its club years, arrived after New Year's to take over. While the team had already been working out under the direction of team captain William Stephenson, it was when Barkell arrived that the real work began. The new bench boss took group of 20 prospective players and tried to craft a team out of equal parts veterans and rookies. Fortunately, cold weather made ice available for the team and they put in several intense sessions before the first game against Rensselaer. While the team was practicing, the school made the decision to construct a temporary rink on Weston Field, the football venue. This was done in part to try to address the problems with poor ice that had plagued the Ephs over the past several years.

Conditions for their first game were ideal and the Ephs displayed a far superior brand of hockey to the Engineers. While the score was a modest 3–0 margin, Lowes had to face just a single shot on goal all game thanks to the stifling defense from the brothers Stephenson. Due to poor ice conditions, the next game was moved to Pittsfield, Massachusetts. On game day, the temperature dipped below zero for the battle with the Mass Aggies. The defense played a strong game, limiting a fast Aggie group to just 2 goals but the offense could not take advantage despite three extra periods. Part of the reason was the bitter cold that saw the game slow down in the later stages and caused a bit of frostbite on some of the players' ears.

The third game of the year pitted Williams against one of the top teams in the nation, Dartmouth. The Ephs' offense looked much better against the Greens and skated well in the first period. Two Purple goals were scored in the opening minutes before the Indians realized they had a fight on their hands and started matching the level of play. Dartmouth cut into the led before the end of the first but Williams retained a 3–1 lead. The Ephs increased their margin in the second with two more goals to take a huge lead but there was still plenty of time left. After the fifth Williams marker, the sleeping giant awoke and began peppering the Purple cage with Shots. In just over a period of play, the Indians scored goals to tie the match and force overtime. Two 5-minute periods went by without another goal and a third, sudden death period was called for. It took 8 minutes for the winning goal to be scored but, unfortunately, it came from the stick of the Dartmouth captain and completed the astounding comeback.

The team had a long layoff afterwards and didn't hit the ice for over two weeks. Upon their return, the Purple club looked sluggish against their old rivals, Amherst. Williams was outplayed in the first two periods and entered the third down by a pair. After the Stephenson brothers were moved up to the forward line in the third, the team began to show signs of life. William scored to cut the lead in half but the resurgence came too late and the Ephs lost the match. A week later, Williams avenged the loss by dominating the Lord Jeffs on their home rink 5–0. The addition of three freshmen to the lineup, Watkins, Howe and Popham, led the team to a stark reversal even amidst a winter storm. Pressprich and Howe proved to be an invaluable combination on the blueline that seemingly stopped every Amherst rush before it neared Lowes.

The team continued its inspired play when it met Army a few days later and scored another 5 goals. Williams was visibly the better team, skating and passing with better efficacy than the Cadets. The Purple kept rolling on the road and trounced the Albany Country Club 7–0. While the game wasn't as bad as the score would indicate, the superiority of Williams' netminder caused the sizable discrepancy. After the game, the team received news that their upcoming game against Columbia was cancelled. The Lions had apparently used several players who were not eligible to participate in earlier games and, once the university found out, the remainder of the season was terminated. Fortunately, Hamilton was willing to step in a replacement opponent.

At the end of February, Williams played its final home game and posted their second consecutive shutout. RPI had arrived for a rematch but the Ephs were still too much for the Engineers and the new-look Purple easily defeated Rensselaer despite a lack of teamwork. The Stephenson brothers combined for 5 goals on the night with William recording a hat-trick. The very hot Ephs then travelled south to face their toughest opponent on the season in Princeton. The Tigers proved to be the better team in the first two periods, opening a 5-goal lead on Williams. The ice at the new Hobey Baker Memorial Rink was sticky due to the humidity in the building and slowed the players down. Lowes, meanwhile, was unable to drop to his knees to stop the puck under the rules outlined by the United States Hockey Association, under which Princeton played. The Purple acclimated to the style by the third and scored twice but it wasn't enough to overcome the large deficit. Soft ice marred the final game of the season, which was also played as four 10-minute periods. Lowes was twice removed from the game with minor penalty for dropping to his knees with John Stephenson subbing into the goal in both instances. During one of those occurrences, Stephenson allowed the only goal from Hamilton but that did not stop Williams from being to finish the season with a win.

After the season, Williams tabulated the cost of running its athletic programs and found that ice hockey, which had been budgeted for $1,000 had a slight overrun and came in at $1,025.48.

William Quaintance Jr. served as team manager with Benjamin Fawcett as his assistant.

== Roster ==
No.	Nat.	Player	Class	Pos	Height	Weight	DoB	Hometown	Previous team
	(United States)	Russell C. Clark	Senior	C/LW			1900-03-23	New Brighton, New York
	(United States)	Henry W. Comstock	Sophomore	D/F			1903-02-19	Buffalo, New York
	(United States)	Meredith Hemphill	Senior	RW			1902-03-05	New York, New York
	(United States)	Frederic W. Howe Jr.	Freshman	D				Providence, Rhode Island
	(United States)	Marvin M. Lowes	Junior	G			1903-06-12	Flushing, New York
	(United States)	Robert M. Popham	Freshman	C				New York, New York
	(United States)	Reginald W. Pressprich Jr.	Junior	D/F			1902-08-05	Rochester, New York
	(United States)	Ebenezer Smith	Freshman	D/W				New York, New York
	(United States)	John A. Stephenson Jr.	Junior	G/D/F			1902-03-20	Duluth, Minnesota
	(United States)	William R. Stephenson (C)	Senior	D/F			1900-05-27	Duluth, Minnesota
	(United States)	Harry A. Watkins	Freshman	C			1904-02-07	South Orange, New Jersey

== Standings ==
1922–23 Eastern Collegiate ice hockey standings
	Intercollegiate							Overall					
	GP	W	L	T	Pct.	GF	GA	GP	W	L	T	GF	GA
Amherst	8	4	3	1	.563	15	24	8	4	3	1	15	24
Army	11	5	6	0	.455	26	35	14	7	7	0	36	39
Bates	9	6	3	0	.667	34	25	12	8	4	0	56	32
Boston College	5	5	0	0	1.000	30	6	14	12	1	1	53	18
Boston University	7	2	5	0	.286	21	22	8	2	6	0	22	26
Bowdoin	6	3	3	0	.500	18	28	9	5	4	0	37	33
Clarkson	3	1	1	1	.500	3	14	6	2	3	1	18	28
Colby	6	2	4	0	.333	15	21	6	2	4	0	15	21
Columbia	9	0	9	0	.000	14	35	9	0	9	0	14	35
Cornell	6	1	3	2	.333	6	16	6	1	3	2	6	16
Dartmouth	12	10	2	0	.833	49	20	15	13	2	0	67	26
Hamilton	7	2	5	0	.286	20	34	10	4	6	0	37	53
Harvard	10	7	3	0	.700	27	11	12	8	4	0	34	19
Maine	6	2	4	0	.333	16	23	6	2	4	0	16	23
Massachusetts Agricultural	9	3	4	2	.444	13	24	9	3	4	2	13	24
Middlebury	3	0	3	0	.000	1	6	3	0	3	0	1	6
MIT	8	3	5	0	.375	16	52	8	3	5	0	16	52
Pennsylvania	6	1	4	1	.250	8	36	7	2	4	1	11	38
Princeton	15	11	4	0	.733	84	21	18	12	5	1	93	30
Rensselaer	5	1	4	0	.200	6	23	5	1	4	0	6	23
Saint Michael's	3	1	2	0	.333	4	5	–	–	–	–	–	–
Union	0	0	0	0	–	0	0	3	2	1	0	–	–
Williams	9	5	3	1	.611	33	17	10	6	3	1	40	17
Yale	13	9	4	0	.692	70	16	15	9	6	0	75	26

== Schedule and results ==
Date	Opponent	Site	Decision	Result	Record
Regular Season
January 13	at Rensselaer*	Russell Sage Rink • Troy, New York	Lowes	W 3–0	1–0–0
January 17	vs. Massachusetts Agricultural*	Commons Rink • Pittsfield, Massachusetts	Lowes	T 2–2 ^{3OT}	1–0–1
January 20	Dartmouth*	Weston Field Rink • Williamstown, Massachusetts	Lowes	L 5–6 ^{3OT}	1–1–1
February 8	Amherst*	Weston Field Rink • Williamstown, Massachusetts	Lowes	L 1–2	1–2–1
February 14	at Amherst*	Pratt Field Rink • Amherst, Massachusetts	Lowes	W 5–0	2–2–1
February 17	at Army*	Stuart Rink • West Point, New York	Lowes	W 5–1	3–2–1
February 20	at Albany Country Club*	Albany Country Club Rink • Albany, New York	Lowes	W 7–0	4–2–1
February 24	Rensselaer*	Weston Field Rink • Williamstown, Massachusetts	Lowes	W 8–0	5–2–1
March 2	at Princeton*	Hobey Baker Memorial Rink • Princeton, New Jersey	Lowes	L 2–5	5–3–1
March 3	at Hamilton*	Russell Sage Rink • Clinton, New York	Lowes	W 2–1	6–3–1
*Non-conference game.

== Scoring statistics ==
Name	Position	Games	Goals
William Stephenson	D/C/RW	10	10
Harry Watkins	C	6	6
John Stephenson	G/D/LW	10	6
Meredith Hemphill	RW	9	5
Reginald Pressprich	D/C/RW	10	5
Frederic Howe	D	6	4
Russell Clark	C/LW	9	2
Robert Popham	C	3	1
Henry Comstock	D/C/RW	5	1
Ebenezer Smith	D/LW/RW	3	0
Marvin Lowes	G	10	0
Total			40

== Goaltending statistics ==
Name	Games	Minutes	Wins	Losses	Ties	Goals Against	Saves	Shut Outs	SV %	GAA
Marvin Lowes	10	480	6	3	1	16		4		1.50
John Stephenson	1	4	0	0	0	1		0		11.25
Total	10	484	6	3	1	17		4		1.58

Note: goals against average is based upon a 45-minute regulation game.
