= 1922–23 Bates men's ice hockey season =

Intercollegiate hockey season

- Conference: Independent
- Home ice: Lake Andrews

Record
- Overall: 8–4–0
- Home: 2–1–0
- Road: 5–1–0
- Neutral: 1–2–0

Coaches and captains
- Head coach: Carleton Wiggin
- Captain: Eddie Roberts

The 1922–23 Bates men's ice hockey season was the 4th season of play for the program.

== Season ==
After the departure of coach Watkins in the offseason, the Bate hockey team was on its third head coach in just 4 years. The program turned to alumnus and former goaltender Carleton Wiggin who was also the head coach of the football team. At the start of the season, the team had an ambitious slate of 14 games arranged with a few more possibly in the works. Leading the team was 4-year player Eddie Roberts, who was expected to take charge on offense while the defense sorted itself out. Carl Rounds graduation was compounded by the loss of Bob Partridge in goal with the latter leaving school early. With the entire defense side needing work, Dick Stanley, who had played wing last year, was dropped back onto the blueline to head the defensive corps.

The first game for the team came in mid-January against Colby, who had now formally joined their CBB brethren in ice hockey. With a bit more experience as a varsity team, Bates was on the attack for most of the game and were able to skate rings around the defensive-minded Mules. Despite Stanley playing defense for the entire game, he was at the forefront of the offense and helped Bates earn a 5–0 win. A few days later, Bates took on St. Dominique's and had an impossible time scoring against the defensive squad. The only goal of the game was scored midway through the second but, unfortunately, the score was from the opposition. Roberts led a valiant effort to get the tying goal in the third but ultimately came up short. After their first loss, the team responded by completely trouncing Bowdoin 12–1, with Roberts and Cogan each netting hat-tricks goals leading the pack. The Garnet outshot the Bears 47–6 and were in control for the entire 45 minute match.

Bates' offense kept rolling in the next two games and flattened a pair of amateur clubs 11–3. The wide margins and relative unimportance of the outcomes allowed coach Wiggin to play many alternates in the games and ensure he had two units of players who knew what to do for the games ahead. In the Augusta game, however, the team was hit by the injury bug when Dick Stanley was forced to leave early and missed the following match. Despite the loss of their top defenseman, Roberts was able to put up 10 goals in the two games to lead the club.

The first big test of the season came with the team firing on all cylinders when they hit to the road to take on Army. Poor weather saw the rink covered in slush and snow that slowed the game and made any kind of teamwork nearly impossible. Roberts and Cogan each scored on individual plays and those two markers were enough to give the Garnet the win. The team continued its road trip by travelling to face Princeton and the game ended up going about as bad for Bates as possible. The Tiger sextet put up 6 goals in the first period and took control of the match. A further 3 goals in the middle period made it nearly impossible for the Garnet to mount a comeback but that didn't stop them from trying. Princeton used alternates for the third period but, despite employing a secondary unit, Bates was still unable to score a single goal. To add injury to insult, Cogan went down with a badly twisted ankle and his availability for the rest of the season was in question.

the exam break gave the team time to rest and recover from the loss and their various ailments and try to get back on the winning side in early-February when they reconvened. Unfortunately, a scarlet fever epidemic meant that the players were forced to stay away and cancel their first return game. The team had hardly any practice time ahead of the match with Maine and were unable to cope with the loss of Cogan, who was still nursing his ankle. Corey provided the only goal for the Garnet, who lost the Augusta Winter Sports Carnival title. A week later, the team faced Bowdoin in a rematch and the lack of ice time over the previous several weeks showed. Even with Cogan back in the lineup, the sluggish Garnet were outskated in the first period but did eventually get their legs beneath them. Despite having three goals disallowed, Bates was still able to take the match 3–1 and keep the hope of the state championship alive.

In the final event of the Auburn Winter Carnival, Boston University gave the Garnet a rude awakening with a 0–6 defeat. Despite outshooting the Bostonians, Cogan's bum ankle put the team at a disadvantage and unable to get the puck past the scarlet goaltender. The next match was a return game against Maine and would decide the state championship. The Orono boys were a match for Bates and the game see-sawed back and forth with neither able to get away from the other. The two teams were tied at 4-all at the end of regulation and agreed to play two 5-minute overtime periods to decide the winner. With just a minute left in the second extra period, Joe Cogan notched his second marker of the game and won the Pine Tree title for the Garnet. A few days later the team finished out its season with another 5-goal win over Colby, posting the best campaign in the history of the young program.

Frederick Noyes served as team manager.

Note: Bates did not adopt the 'Bobcats' moniker until 1924.

== Roster ==
No.	Nat.	Player	Class	Pos	Height	Weight	DoB	Hometown	Previous team
	(United States)	Raymond J. Batten	Senior	G			1901-03-09	Wakefield, Massachusetts
	(United States)	Joseph W. Cogan	Junior	C/RW			1902-01-01	Stoneham, Massachusetts
	(United States)	Ralph L. Corey	Sophomore	C/RW			1898-05-10	Springvale, Maine
	(United States)	John P. Davis	Freshman	D			1905-01-19	Washington, D.C.
	(United States)	Albert H. Dimlich	Sophomore	D/C			1903-02-10	Andover, Massachusetts
		Arthur A. Leonardi	Freshman	C/RW
		Maurice T. Messier	Freshman	C
		Maurice Rhuland	Freshman	RW
	(United States)	Edward F. Roberts (C)	Senior	LW			1901-10-14	Presque Isle, Maine
		Arthur E. Robinson	Freshman	RW
	(United States)	Arthur B. Scott	Junior	D/LW			1900-02-26	South Boston, Massachusetts
		John P. Stanley Jr.	Freshman	D/LW
	(United States)	Richard J. Stanley	Junior	D/C			1902-08-20	Lewiston, Maine
	(United States)	David Wyllie	Freshman	G			1904-07-11	Whitneyville, Connecticut

== Standings ==
1922–23 Eastern Collegiate ice hockey standings
	Intercollegiate							Overall					
	GP	W	L	T	Pct.	GF	GA	GP	W	L	T	GF	GA
Amherst	8	4	3	1	.563	15	24	8	4	3	1	15	24
Army	11	5	6	0	.455	26	35	14	7	7	0	36	39
Bates	9	6	3	0	.667	34	25	12	8	4	0	56	32
Boston College	5	5	0	0	1.000	30	6	14	12	1	1	53	18
Boston University	7	2	5	0	.286	21	22	8	2	6	0	22	26
Bowdoin	6	3	3	0	.500	18	28	9	5	4	0	37	33
Clarkson	3	1	1	1	.500	3	14	6	2	3	1	18	28
Colby	6	2	4	0	.333	15	21	6	2	4	0	15	21
Columbia	9	0	9	0	.000	14	35	9	0	9	0	14	35
Cornell	6	1	3	2	.333	6	16	6	1	3	2	6	16
Dartmouth	12	10	2	0	.833	49	20	15	13	2	0	67	26
Hamilton	7	2	5	0	.286	20	34	10	4	6	0	37	53
Harvard	10	7	3	0	.700	27	11	12	8	4	0	34	19
Maine	6	2	4	0	.333	16	23	6	2	4	0	16	23
Massachusetts Agricultural	9	3	4	2	.444	13	24	9	3	4	2	13	24
Middlebury	3	0	3	0	.000	1	6	3	0	3	0	1	6
MIT	8	3	5	0	.375	16	52	8	3	5	0	16	52
Pennsylvania	6	1	4	1	.250	8	36	7	2	4	1	11	38
Princeton	15	11	4	0	.733	84	21	18	12	5	1	93	30
Rensselaer	5	1	4	0	.200	6	23	5	1	4	0	6	23
Saint Michael's	3	1	2	0	.333	4	5	–	–	–	–	–	–
Union	0	0	0	0	–	0	0	3	2	1	0	–	–
Williams	9	5	3	1	.611	33	17	10	6	3	1	40	17
Yale	13	9	4	0	.692	70	16	15	9	6	0	75	26

== Schedule and results ==
Date	Opponent	Site	Result	Record
Regular Season
January 13	Colby*	Lake Andrews Rink • Lewiston, Maine	W 5–0	1–0–0
January 15	St. Dominique's*	Lake Andrews Rink • Lewiston, Maine	L 0–1	1–1–0
January 17	at Bowdoin*	Delta Rink • Brunswick, Maine	W 12–1	2–1–0
January 19	at Augusta Hockey Club*	Capital Park Rink • Augusta, Maine	W 11–3	3–1–0
January 21	Portland Knights of Columbus*	Lake Andrews Rink • Lewiston, Maine	W 11–3	4–1–0
January 23	at Army*	Stuart Rink • West Point, New York	W 2–1	5–1–0
January 27	at Princeton*	Hobey Baker Memorial Rink • Princeton, New Jersey	L 0–9	5–2–0
February 14	vs. Maine*	Capital Park Rink • Augusta, Maine	L 1–2	5–3–0
February 22	vs. Bowdoin*	Auburn Rink • Auburn, Maine	W 3–1	6–3–0
February 25	vs. Boston University*	Auburn Rink • Auburn, Maine	L 0–6	6–4–0
February 27	at Maine*	Alumni Field Rink • Orono, Maine	W 5–4 ^{2OT}	7–4–0
March 1	at Colby*	South End Arena • Waterville, Maine	W 6–1	8–4–0
*Non-conference game.

== Scoring statistics ==
Name	Position	Games	Goals
Eddie Roberts	LW	12	17
Joe Cogan	C/RW	11	16
Tibbie Leonardi	C/RW	9	7
Dick Stanley	C/D	10	6
Pop Corey	C/RW	12	6
Junie Stanley	D/LW	10	4
Maurice Messier	C	1	0
Maurice Rhuland	RW	1	0
Arthur Robinson	RW	1	0
Dave Wyllie	G	1	0
Al Dimlich	D/C	3	0
John Davis	D	4	0
Ray Batten	G	12	0
Red Scott	D/LW	12	0
Total			56
