= 1922–23 Penn Quakers men's ice hockey season =

- Home ice: Philadelphia Ice Palace

Record
- Overall: 2–4–1
- Home: 1–1–1
- Road: 0–3–0
- Neutral: 1–0–0

Coaches and captains
- Head coach: Eddie Powers
- Captain: Percy Wanamaker

The 1922–23 Penn Quakers men's ice hockey season was the 11th season of play for the program.

== Season ==
At the start of the season, Penn was able to get Eddie Powers to coach both the ice hockey and lacrosse teams. Early in the season the team had difficulty in getting ice time to practice. Despite the difficulty, there was some optimism surrounding the team as only one player was lost due to graduation and, with the club having played well, there was hope that the team could get over the hump in 1923.

The team played its first game just after returning from the Christmas break when they travelled to West Point. Playing through a blizzard, the two teams fought in a rough game that required overtime but Army ended up as the victor. An exhibition game came less than a week later when Penn arrived at the Hobey Baker Memorial Rink for the first time. Before the game began the Quakers were already at a disadvantage due to a lack of practice and lost their captain, Wanamaker, to a leg injury. The result was a complete demolition by the Tigers to the tune of 13–1. The team's second practice didn't occur until after the second game and, judging by the score, was sorely needed.

The biggest problem was having to contend with the lack of funds for the program. Due to the only available rink being the Philadelphia Ice Palace, Penn had to pay every time they wanted to use the facility. That wasn't a problem for games, as they would be able to recoup the cost with ticket sales, but practices were an expense the team, as a minor program, couldn't readily afford. Entering the next game the team was able to practice several times, but the most important aspect for the team was the attendance. The administration was having second thoughts about continuing the expensive program and would only allow it to continue if a significant number of spectators would show. The team performed well but lost the match 0–2. They did, however, draw a crowd of 1,200 and the team was allowed to continue.

During the examination period, Penn won its first game of the year when they downed an old foe, Swarthmore, but were stomped by a surging Yale squad before the week was out. The much smaller rink proved a hindrance to the Quakers, but the team forged ahead despite the loss. After a game against Lafayette was cancelled, Coach Powers left the team to handle a family illness. The team took care of itself in his absence and prepared for their game against Cornell. The team played its best all-around game of the year, earning a tie against the Big Red which included three extra periods.

The Quakers ended their season with a rematch against Princeton. With much more experience under their belt, the team was expected to play the Tigers much more effectively than they had back in January. The game started slowly but a 5-goal middle period from the visitors handed Penn another loss and the team ended the year with a poor record but had hope for the future with the team's renewed popularity.

== Roster ==
No.	Nat.	Player	Class	Pos	Height	Weight	DoB	Hometown	Previous team
		Caminez		G
		Gary		RW
		Richard Kearns Jr.		D/LW
		G. Murray		D
		O'Reilly		C/RW
		Andrew C. Pringle	Senior	C
		Scott		G
		C. Smith		D
	(United States)	Percy Wanamaker (C)	Senior	C/LW				Melrose, Massachusetts

== Standings ==
1922–23 Eastern Collegiate ice hockey standings
	Intercollegiate							Overall					
	GP	W	L	T	Pct.	GF	GA	GP	W	L	T	GF	GA
Amherst	8	4	3	1	.563	15	24	8	4	3	1	15	24
Army	11	5	6	0	.455	26	35	14	7	7	0	36	39
Bates	9	6	3	0	.667	34	25	12	8	4	0	56	32
Boston College	5	5	0	0	1.000	30	6	14	12	1	1	53	18
Boston University	7	2	5	0	.286	21	22	8	2	6	0	22	26
Bowdoin	6	3	3	0	.500	18	28	9	5	4	0	37	33
Clarkson	3	1	1	1	.500	3	14	6	2	3	1	18	28
Colby	6	2	4	0	.333	15	21	6	2	4	0	15	21
Columbia	9	0	9	0	.000	14	35	9	0	9	0	14	35
Cornell	6	1	3	2	.333	6	16	6	1	3	2	6	16
Dartmouth	12	10	2	0	.833	49	20	15	13	2	0	67	26
Hamilton	7	2	5	0	.286	20	34	10	4	6	0	37	53
Harvard	10	7	3	0	.700	27	11	12	8	4	0	34	19
Maine	6	2	4	0	.333	16	23	6	2	4	0	16	23
Massachusetts Agricultural	9	3	4	2	.444	13	24	9	3	4	2	13	24
Middlebury	3	0	3	0	.000	1	6	3	0	3	0	1	6
MIT	8	3	5	0	.375	16	52	8	3	5	0	16	52
Pennsylvania	6	1	4	1	.250	8	36	7	2	4	1	11	38
Princeton	15	11	4	0	.733	84	21	18	12	5	1	93	30
Rensselaer	5	1	4	0	.200	6	23	5	1	4	0	6	23
Saint Michael's	3	1	2	0	.333	4	5	–	–	–	–	–	–
Union	0	0	0	0	–	0	0	3	2	1	0	–	–
Williams	9	5	3	1	.611	33	17	10	6	3	1	40	17
Yale	13	9	4	0	.692	70	16	15	9	6	0	75	26

== Schedule and results ==
Date	Opponent	Site	Result	Record
Regular Season
January 6	at Army*	Stuart Rink • West Point, New York	L 1–2 ^{OT}	0–1–0
January 10 ^{†}	at Princeton*	Hobey Baker Memorial Rink • Princeton, New Jersey	L 1–13	0–2–0
January 22	Columbia*	Philadelphia Ice Palace • Philadelphia, Pennsylvania	W 0–2 ^{forfeit}	1–2–0
February 6	vs. Swarthmore ^{‡}*	Philadelphia Ice Palace • Philadelphia, Pennsylvania	W 3–2	2–2–0
February 10	at Yale*	New Haven Arena • New Haven, Connecticut	L 2–11	2–3–0
February 22	Cornell*	Philadelphia Ice Palace • Philadelphia, Pennsylvania	T 2–2 ^{3OT}	2–3–1
March 7	Princeton*	Philadelphia Ice Palace • Philadelphia, Pennsylvania	L 2–6	2–4–1
*Non-conference game.

† Penn regarded the first match against Princeton as a practice game, however, that was an unofficial distinction.
‡ Swarthmore did not field a varsity hockey team at this time.
