= 1922–23 Amherst Lord Jeffs men's ice hockey season =

- Conference: Independent
- Home ice: Pratt Field

Record
- Overall: 5–3–1
- Home: 3–1–0
- Road: 1–2–1
- Neutral: 1–0–0

Coaches and captains
- Captain: Leon Plumer

The 1922–23 Amherst Lord Jeffs men's ice hockey season was the 10th season of play for the program.

== Season ==
Amherst received welcome news at the start of the season when Leon Plumer was able to return to the ice for the first time in almost three years. The change came at a good time as the team's captain-elect, Frank Hunter, was ruled ineligible and the team's former coach was swiftly chosen as the replacement. For the first time in years, the weather was accommodating and allowed the team to get in several days of practice ahead of their opening match with Columbia. Though Amherst fell to the Lions 2–5, it was later revealed that Columbia used ringers in their games and the school forfeited all of their wins for the season. Amherst never claimed victory in the game and instead decided to list the match as a 'no-contest' in their records, however, the match is officially a forfeit by Columbia.

The first game that remained on the record happened the following evening when Amherst stopped in West Point. The game saw a distinct improvement by the club and, despite losing, the Lord Jeffs appeared to be rounding into form. That theory was tested the following week after returning home when they travelled across town to face their nemesis, Massachusetts Agricultural. From the drop of the puck both teams were skating up and down the ice. MAC got on the board first but stellar play from Leaycraft kept the purple within one. However, as time ticked away Amherst remained scoreless. With just 5 second left in regulation, Plumer poked the puck into the net and forced overtime. The fast pace of regulation took its toll on both squads and the extra sessions were visible slower. The Aggies had the better of the play but were unable to solve Leaycraft a second time. After six 5-minute overtimes passed without a further goal, both squads agreed to call the match a draw and prepared themselves for the rematch.

The first home game of the year came against the American School of Osteopathy, who were barnstorming though the northeast that winter. By all accounts the Lord Jeffs were the superior team but their lack of offense nearly cost them. The team managed to eke out a 1–0 win before pausing for the exam period. The break in the schedule gave the team time to try and work on its offense. Knowing they needed more heading into the rematch with the Aggies. Poor ice conditions caused the match to be postposed for a week but that served Amherst all the better. When the rematch finally did take place, fast ice allowed Albert Sylvester to score twice, sandwiching his goals around one marker from MAC and another from Titus. Two days later Sylvester was again the hero by scoring both goals in a win over Williams. The Jeffs then had the chance to prove that they were the best of the small schools in the rematch a week later, however, Williams buckled down and completely overwhelmed Amherst to split the season series.

A few days after the defeat, Amherst was able to take their frustrations out on a weak Rensselaer squad and posted the best offensive performance since before the war. The team then concluded its season the following week when they travelled south to take on Yale. While the Bulldogs were not having a good season by their standards, they were still one of the best college teams in the country; a fact they made very clear by their treatment of the Lord Jeffs. Amherst was completely at the mercy of the Eli attack all evening and they could only watch as goal after goal were scored in their cage. Leaycraft did his best against the Bulldogs but in the end the team lost 0–13, the worst defeat the purple had ever suffered.

In spite of the rather disastrous ending, Amherst was still able to claim success on the season. With a winning record and victories over their main rivals, the Lord Jeffs looked like they had recovered from their time off.

Howard C. Walker served as team manager with Lyall Merrill as his assistant.

== Roster ==
| No. | Nat. | Player | Class | Pos | Height | Weight | DoB | Hometown | Previous team |
|---|---|---|---|---|---|---|---|---|---|
| | (United States) | Crosby Allison | Sophomore | D | | | | Brooklyn, New York |
| | (United States) | Corydon Jones | Junior | D/LW | | | | Minneapolis, Minnesota |
| | (United States) | Joseph R. Kingman Jr. | Junior | LW | | | 1900-06-08 | Minneapolis, Minnesota |
| | (United States) | John W. Leaycraft | Junior | G | | | 1901-01-24 | Jersey City, New Jersey |
| | (United States) | Leonidas N. Plumer | Senior (RS) | D | | | | Newton Center, Massachusetts |
| | (United States) | Albert L. Sylvester Jr. | Junior | RW | | | 1903-05-06 | Norwell, Massachusetts |
| | (United States) | George L. Titus | Junior | C | | | 1903-01-30 | Brooklyn, New York |
| | (United States) | Charles S. Wilcox | Senior | D | | | 1901-11-22 | Rochester, New York |

== Standings ==
1922–23 Eastern Collegiate ice hockey standings
| | Intercollegiate | | | | | | | Overall | | | | | |
| | GP | W | L | T | Pct. | GF | GA | GP | W | L | T | GF | GA |
|---|---|---|---|---|---|---|---|---|---|---|---|---|---|
| Amherst | 8 | 4 | 3 | 1 | .563 | 15 | 24 | 8 | 4 | 3 | 1 | 15 | 24 |
| Army | 11 | 5 | 6 | 0 | .455 | 26 | 35 | 14 | 7 | 7 | 0 | 36 | 39 |
| Bates | 9 | 6 | 3 | 0 | .667 | 34 | 25 | 12 | 8 | 4 | 0 | 56 | 32 |
| Boston College | 5 | 5 | 0 | 0 | 1.000 | 30 | 6 | 14 | 12 | 1 | 1 | 53 | 18 |
| Boston University | 7 | 2 | 5 | 0 | .286 | 21 | 22 | 8 | 2 | 6 | 0 | 22 | 26 |
| Bowdoin | 6 | 3 | 3 | 0 | .500 | 18 | 28 | 9 | 5 | 4 | 0 | 37 | 33 |
| Clarkson | 3 | 1 | 1 | 1 | .500 | 3 | 14 | 6 | 2 | 3 | 1 | 18 | 28 |
| Colby | 6 | 2 | 4 | 0 | .333 | 15 | 21 | 6 | 2 | 4 | 0 | 15 | 21 |
| Columbia | 9 | 0 | 9 | 0 | .000 | 14 | 35 | 9 | 0 | 9 | 0 | 14 | 35 |
| Cornell | 6 | 1 | 3 | 2 | .333 | 6 | 16 | 6 | 1 | 3 | 2 | 6 | 16 |
| Dartmouth | 12 | 10 | 2 | 0 | .833 | 49 | 20 | 15 | 13 | 2 | 0 | 67 | 26 |
| Hamilton | 7 | 2 | 5 | 0 | .286 | 20 | 34 | 10 | 4 | 6 | 0 | 37 | 53 |
| Harvard | 10 | 7 | 3 | 0 | .700 | 27 | 11 | 12 | 8 | 4 | 0 | 34 | 19 |
| Maine | 6 | 2 | 4 | 0 | .333 | 16 | 23 | 6 | 2 | 4 | 0 | 16 | 23 |
| Massachusetts Agricultural | 9 | 3 | 4 | 2 | .444 | 13 | 24 | 9 | 3 | 4 | 2 | 13 | 24 |
| Middlebury | 3 | 0 | 3 | 0 | .000 | 1 | 6 | 3 | 0 | 3 | 0 | 1 | 6 |
| MIT | 8 | 3 | 5 | 0 | .375 | 16 | 52 | 8 | 3 | 5 | 0 | 16 | 52 |
| Pennsylvania | 6 | 1 | 4 | 1 | .250 | 8 | 36 | 7 | 2 | 4 | 1 | 11 | 38 |
| Princeton | 15 | 11 | 4 | 0 | .733 | 84 | 21 | 18 | 12 | 5 | 1 | 93 | 30 |
| Rensselaer | 5 | 1 | 4 | 0 | .200 | 6 | 23 | 5 | 1 | 4 | 0 | 6 | 23 |
| Saint Michael's | 3 | 1 | 2 | 0 | .333 | 4 | 5 | – | – | – | – | – | – |
| Union | 0 | 0 | 0 | 0 | – | 0 | 0 | 3 | 2 | 1 | 0 | – | – |
| Williams | 9 | 5 | 3 | 1 | .611 | 33 | 17 | 10 | 6 | 3 | 1 | 40 | 17 |
| Yale | 13 | 9 | 4 | 0 | .692 | 70 | 16 | 15 | 9 | 6 | 0 | 75 | 26 |

== Schedule and results ==
| Date | Opponent | Site | Result | Record |
Regular Season
| January 12 | vs. Columbia* | Iceland Rink • New York, New York | 2–5 (forfeit) | |
| January 13 | at Army* | Stuart Rink • West Point, New York | L 1–2 | 0–1–0 |
| January 20 ^{†} | at Massachusetts Agricultural* | Alumni Field Rink • Amherst, Massachusetts | T 1–1 ^{6OT} | 0–1–1 |
| January 24 | A.T. Still* | Pratt Field Rink • Amherst, Massachusetts | W 1–0 | 1–1–1 |
| February 6 | Massachusetts Agricultural* | Pratt Field Rink • Amherst, Massachusetts | W 3–1 | 2–1–1 |
| February 8 | at Williams* | Weston Field Rink • Williamstown, Massachusetts | W 2–1 | 3–1–1 |
| February 15 | Williams* | Pratt Field Rink • Amherst, Massachusetts | L 0–5 | 3–2–1 |
| February 17 | vs. Rensselaer* | Alumni Field Rink • Amherst, Massachusetts | W 7–1 | 4–2–1 |
| February 21 | at Yale* | New Haven Arena • New Haven, Connecticut | L 0–13 | 4–3–1 |
*Non-conference game.

† MAC records indicate the game was played on the 19th of January.
