= 1922–23 MIT Engineers men's ice hockey season =

- Conference: Independent
- Home ice: Boston Arena

Record
- Overall: 3–5–0
- Road: 1–3–0
- Neutral: 2–2–0

Coaches and captains
- Head coach: Al Blacklock
- Captain: Herbert Hayden

The 1922–23 MIT Engineers men's ice hockey season was the 22nd season of play for the program. The Engineers were coached by Al Blacklock in his 1st season.

== Season ==
With a new coach and half of the players new to the program, the Engineers had precious little time to get ready for their first game of the season. Despite the early start, MIT was nonetheless able to defeat Boston University in the opening match. With almost a month until the next game, the Engineers spent whatever time they could scrounge at the Boston Arena, preparing for the showdown with Princeton. Unfortunately, MIT was no match for the mighty Tigers and the Bostonians were swept off of the brand new Hobey Baker Memorial Rink. The following week, the team was blanked for a second time at the hands of Boston College. While those results weren't encouraging, the two losses came against two of the best teams in college hockey.

MIT was able to get back on the winning side of the ledger in their rematch with BU. Though it was a much closer game, the Engineers proved to be the superior squad and then carried that momentum into a win over Army a few days later. January ended with the team facing its old nemesis, Harvard, with MIT still hopelessly outgunned by the college hockey elite. Harvard steamrolled the Engineers 0–10, which was a portent of things to come. In their final two matches, MIT faced two more Ivy League teams and saw similar results in both. While their defense was slightly better against Yale, they suffered their worse loss on the year in the finale against Dartmouth.

Boynton Fletcher served as team manager with Theodore Butler and Walton Jarman as his assistants.

== Roster ==
No.	Nat.	Player	Class	Pos	Height	Weight	DoB	Hometown	Previous team
		George M. Balcom	Sophomore	C
	(United States)	William H. Blandy	Senior				1902-01-19	Newton, Massachusetts
	(United States)	Joseph G. Dalton	Junior	C			1899-11-12	Brookline, Massachusetts
		Cornelius M. Flynn	Sophomore	D
	(United States)	Herbert L. Hayden (C)	Junior	LW			1900-02-06	Cambridge, Massachusetts
		Edward B. Johnson	Junior	RW
	(Canada)	Neil A. MacNeil	Senior	D			1899-04-07	Grand Narrows, Nova Scotia
	(Canada)	Denton Massey	Senior	G			1900-06-20	Toronto, Ontario
	(United States)	Gardner B. McPherson	Junior				1903-04-05	Brookline, Massachusetts
		Edwin J. Moulton	Freshman	D
		Hugh D. Nickle	Senior	G			1900-11-14
		David D. Peene	Sophomore	D/W

== Standings ==
1922–23 Eastern Collegiate ice hockey standings
	Intercollegiate							Overall					
	GP	W	L	T	Pct.	GF	GA	GP	W	L	T	GF	GA
Amherst	8	4	3	1	.563	15	24	8	4	3	1	15	24
Army	11	5	6	0	.455	26	35	14	7	7	0	36	39
Bates	9	6	3	0	.667	34	25	12	8	4	0	56	32
Boston College	5	5	0	0	1.000	30	6	14	12	1	1	53	18
Boston University	7	2	5	0	.286	21	22	8	2	6	0	22	26
Bowdoin	6	3	3	0	.500	18	28	9	5	4	0	37	33
Clarkson	3	1	1	1	.500	3	14	6	2	3	1	18	28
Colby	6	2	4	0	.333	15	21	6	2	4	0	15	21
Columbia	9	0	9	0	.000	14	35	9	0	9	0	14	35
Cornell	6	1	3	2	.333	6	16	6	1	3	2	6	16
Dartmouth	12	10	2	0	.833	49	20	15	13	2	0	67	26
Hamilton	7	2	5	0	.286	20	34	10	4	6	0	37	53
Harvard	10	7	3	0	.700	27	11	12	8	4	0	34	19
Maine	6	2	4	0	.333	16	23	6	2	4	0	16	23
Massachusetts Agricultural	9	3	4	2	.444	13	24	9	3	4	2	13	24
Middlebury	3	0	3	0	.000	1	6	3	0	3	0	1	6
MIT	8	3	5	0	.375	16	52	8	3	5	0	16	52
Pennsylvania	6	1	4	1	.250	8	36	7	2	4	1	11	38
Princeton	15	11	4	0	.733	84	21	18	12	5	1	93	30
Rensselaer	5	1	4	0	.200	6	23	5	1	4	0	6	23
Saint Michael's	3	1	2	0	.333	4	5	–	–	–	–	–	–
Union	0	0	0	0	–	0	0	3	2	1	0	–	–
Williams	9	5	3	1	.611	33	17	10	6	3	1	40	17
Yale	13	9	4	0	.692	70	16	15	9	6	0	75	26

== Schedule and results ==
Date	Opponent	Site	Result	Record
Regular Season
December 8	vs. Boston University*	Boston Arena • Boston, Massachusetts	W 7–4	1–0–0
January 6	at Princeton*	Hobey Baker Memorial Rink • Princeton, New Jersey	L 0–9	1–1–0
January 11	vs. Boston College*	Boston Arena • Boston, Massachusetts	L 0–4	1–2–0
January 17	vs. Boston University*	Boston Arena • Boston, Massachusetts	W 3–2	2–2–0
January 20	at Army*	Stuart Rink • West Point, New York	W 6–5	3–2–0
January 26	vs. Harvard*	Boston Arena • Boston, Massachusetts	L 0–10	3–3–0
February 3	at Yale*	New Haven Arena • New Haven, Connecticut	L 0–6	3–4–0
February 10	at Dartmouth*	Occom Pond • Hanover, New Hampshire	L 0–12	3–5–0
*Non-conference game.
