= 1922–23 RPI Engineers men's ice hockey season =

- Conference: Independent

Record
- Overall: 1–4–0
- Home: 1–1–0
- Road: 0–3–0

Coaches and captains
- Head coach: Leroy Clark
- Captain: MacKenzie McIntyre

The 1922–23 RPI Engineers men's ice hockey season was the 20th season of play for the program. The team was coached by Leroy Clark in his 6th season.

== Season ==
Following a season with limited offensive production, Rensselaer began its twentieth year of ice hockey seeking improved performance. In the season opening against Williams, the team lost 0–3 while recording one shot on goal. One week later the Engineers faced Middlebury, a program playing its first varsity season with limited prior practice time. Middlebury remained competitive until the second half, when RPI began scoring. Reuther recorded a hat-trick in the game, exceeding the team's total scoring output from 1922 and securing the program's first victory in nearly two years.

Unfortunately, the team didn't have a chance to build upon their win as the next game for the Engineers didn't come for almost 3 weeks. In the interim the Engineers practiced as much as they could so by the time they hit the ice in West Point the team looked bit more composed than they did in January. RPI lost to Army, however, they were playing a squad that had just taken down one of the best teams in the country and the fact that RPI could hold its own was a testament to the team's improvement. Unfortunately, whatever positive signs was shown against the Cadets vanished in the final two games. Rensselaer was hammered by both Amherst and Williams, losing by a combined score of 1–15.

Even with the embarrassing loses, Rensselaer had shown modest improvement. However, it was not enough for the team's head coach as Leroy Clark stepped down from his post after the season.

== Roster ==
No.	Nat.	Player	Class	Pos	Height	Weight	DoB	Hometown	Previous team
		Cliffton W. Bolieau		RW
		William Cramp		C/LW
		Dureau		LW/RW
		Farquhar		D
		MacKenzie MacIntyre (C)		D
		John Reuther		C/RW
		Robbins		G
		White		RW

== Standings ==
1922–23 Eastern Collegiate ice hockey standings
	Intercollegiate							Overall					
	GP	W	L	T	Pct.	GF	GA	GP	W	L	T	GF	GA
Amherst	8	4	3	1	.563	15	24	8	4	3	1	15	24
Army	11	5	6	0	.455	26	35	14	7	7	0	36	39
Bates	9	6	3	0	.667	34	25	12	8	4	0	56	32
Boston College	5	5	0	0	1.000	30	6	14	12	1	1	53	18
Boston University	7	2	5	0	.286	21	22	8	2	6	0	22	26
Bowdoin	6	3	3	0	.500	18	28	9	5	4	0	37	33
Clarkson	3	1	1	1	.500	3	14	6	2	3	1	18	28
Colby	6	2	4	0	.333	15	21	6	2	4	0	15	21
Columbia	9	0	9	0	.000	14	35	9	0	9	0	14	35
Cornell	6	1	3	2	.333	6	16	6	1	3	2	6	16
Dartmouth	12	10	2	0	.833	49	20	15	13	2	0	67	26
Hamilton	7	2	5	0	.286	20	34	10	4	6	0	37	53
Harvard	10	7	3	0	.700	27	11	12	8	4	0	34	19
Maine	6	2	4	0	.333	16	23	6	2	4	0	16	23
Massachusetts Agricultural	9	3	4	2	.444	13	24	9	3	4	2	13	24
Middlebury	3	0	3	0	.000	1	6	3	0	3	0	1	6
MIT	8	3	5	0	.375	16	52	8	3	5	0	16	52
Pennsylvania	6	1	4	1	.250	8	36	7	2	4	1	11	38
Princeton	15	11	4	0	.733	84	21	18	12	5	1	93	30
Rensselaer	5	1	4	0	.200	6	23	5	1	4	0	6	23
Saint Michael's	3	1	2	0	.333	4	5	–	–	–	–	–	–
Union	0	0	0	0	–	0	0	3	2	1	0	–	–
Williams	9	5	3	1	.611	33	17	10	6	3	1	40	17
Yale	13	9	4	0	.692	70	16	15	9	6	0	75	26

== Schedule and results ==
Date	Opponent	Site	Result	Record
Regular Season
January 13	Williams*	Russell Sage Rink • Troy, New York	L 0–3	0–1–0
January 20	Middlebury*	Russell Sage Rink • Troy, New York	W 3–0	1–1–0
February 10	at Army*	Stuart Rink • West Point, New York	L 2–5	1–2–0
February 17	vs. Amherst*	Alumni Field Rink • Amherst, Massachusetts	L 1–7	1–3–0
February 24	at Williams*	Weston Field Rink • Williamstown, Massachusetts	L 0–8	1–4–0
*Non-conference game.
