= 1922–23 Boston University Terriers men's ice hockey season =

- Conference: Independent
- Home ice: Boston Arena

Record
- Overall: 2–6–0
- Home: 1–0–0
- Road: 1–1–0
- Neutral: 0–5–0

Coaches and captains
- Head coach: John O'Hare

The 1922–23 Boston University Terriers men's ice hockey season was the 3rd season of play for the program. The Terriers were coached by John O'Hare in his first season.

== Season ==
After two abortive attempts to start the program, Boston University was finally able to secure an arrangement to use the Boston Arena as its home venue. Not only did this give the program a home rink for the first time but it also allowed the Terriers to schedule more than a handful of games. The school brought in John O'Hare to head the program but, with no experienced players on the roster, the team had limited chances for wins.

BU opened the season with a pair of games in December against local colleges. The opening match, against MIT served as a poor omen for the Terriers as BU managed to score 4 goals, more than they had in their earlier two seasons combined, but allowed 7 in the loss. Though it was an unfortunate result, it was far better than the team had fared in either of their matches in 1920. Less than a week later, the team was set against three-time defending intercollegiate champions, Harvard. The Crimson scored twice in the first period, however, the BU defense tightened afterwards and didn't allow the mighty Harvard squad another goal. The surprising performance was not enough to give the Terriers a chance to win, however, as the Crimson defense was its typically impenetrable self.

It was nearly a month before the team's next game and the Terriers did what they could to work on the issues that had been revealed in the first two games. The time off appeared to work wonders for the team as they dominated a Massachusetts Agricultural team upon their return. Kontoff and Sterling were stellar on defense, breaking up many an attack from the Aggies. Almer scored the first hat-trick in program history to lead the team to its first ever win. The following Week the team got its chance for revenge against MIT. While the defense remained in fine form, The offense could only summon up a single goal. With the score even at the end of regulation, two 5-minute overtime periods were agreed to but, unfortunately, it was MIT who got the final marker.

A week or so after the near miss, BU met Boston College at the Arena. The Eagles were in the middle of a championship run and were expected to roll over the Terriers, however, BU had other ideas. Beauchemin played probably his best game of the season, repeatedly preventing BC from scoring what looked to be a sure goal and kept his team in the contest. Provost opened the scoring in the second, and the defense then tried to hold on to its 1-goal lead until the end of the match. The Eagles did eventually even the score but overtime was needed to settle the score. In the first of two 5-minute overtime periods, Almer gave BU its second lead of the game but the withering attack from Boston College tied the game for a second time. After the first two extra sessions, a third sudden death period was instituted. BU kept to its game, holding off the Eagles for about 15 minutes, but the both teams were looking increasingly exhausted as time went on. Eventually a tired Kontoff lost the puck to Len Morrissey who skated up the ice and wired a shot past Beauchemin for the winning goal. About two weeks later the two had a rematch and BC was not going to give the Terriers a second chance at an upset. The Eagles pumped 7 goals into the BU cage and put to rest any pretensions from the scarlet skaters.

A day after their second loss to Boston College, BU was in New Haven for its first road game and took on a local semi-pro outfit. Despite being vastly over-matched in terms of age, experience and size, the Terriers played well and only surrendered 4 goals to the New Haven Bears. After that, the team returned home and trained for over two weeks before hitting the road for their final game of the season. BU met Bates at the Winter Carnival in Auburn and showed out with a 6–0 win. Kontoff and Almer each scored a pair to end BU's first full season on a high note.

== Roster ==
No.	Nat.	Player	Class	Pos	Height	Weight	DoB	Hometown	Previous team
		Ernest J. Almer		F
		Carl Anderson		F
		Joseph Beauchemin		G
		Robert Blais		F
		Mickey Cochrane		D
		John Diehl		G
		Frazier		D
		Peter Kelley
		Morris Kontoff		D
		Roderick Ling
		Harry McArdle		F
		Adolphus Provost		D/F
		Louis Rosenfield
		Sherman		F
		George Sterling		D/F
		William Wennerberg

== Standings ==
1922–23 Eastern Collegiate ice hockey standings
	Intercollegiate							Overall					
	GP	W	L	T	Pct.	GF	GA	GP	W	L	T	GF	GA
Amherst	8	4	3	1	.563	15	24	8	4	3	1	15	24
Army	11	5	6	0	.455	26	35	14	7	7	0	36	39
Bates	9	6	3	0	.667	34	25	12	8	4	0	56	32
Boston College	5	5	0	0	1.000	30	6	14	12	1	1	53	18
Boston University	7	2	5	0	.286	21	22	8	2	6	0	22	26
Bowdoin	6	3	3	0	.500	18	28	9	5	4	0	37	33
Clarkson	3	1	1	1	.500	3	14	6	2	3	1	18	28
Colby	6	2	4	0	.333	15	21	6	2	4	0	15	21
Columbia	9	0	9	0	.000	14	35	9	0	9	0	14	35
Cornell	6	1	3	2	.333	6	16	6	1	3	2	6	16
Dartmouth	12	10	2	0	.833	49	20	15	13	2	0	67	26
Hamilton	7	2	5	0	.286	20	34	10	4	6	0	37	53
Harvard	10	7	3	0	.700	27	11	12	8	4	0	34	19
Maine	6	2	4	0	.333	16	23	6	2	4	0	16	23
Massachusetts Agricultural	9	3	4	2	.444	13	24	9	3	4	2	13	24
Middlebury	3	0	3	0	.000	1	6	3	0	3	0	1	6
MIT	8	3	5	0	.375	16	52	8	3	5	0	16	52
Pennsylvania	6	1	4	1	.250	8	36	7	2	4	1	11	38
Princeton	15	11	4	0	.733	84	21	18	12	5	1	93	30
Rensselaer	5	1	4	0	.200	6	23	5	1	4	0	6	23
Saint Michael's	3	1	2	0	.333	4	5	–	–	–	–	–	–
Union	0	0	0	0	–	0	0	3	2	1	0	–	–
Williams	9	5	3	1	.611	33	17	10	6	3	1	40	17
Yale	13	9	4	0	.692	70	16	15	9	6	0	75	26

== Schedule and results ==
Date	Opponent	Site	Result	Record
Regular Season
December 8	vs. MIT*	Boston Arena • Boston, Massachusetts	L 4–7	0–1–0
December 13	vs. Harvard*	Boston Arena • Boston, Massachusetts	L 0–2	0–2–0
January 11	Massachusetts Agricultural*	Boston Arena • Boston, Massachusetts	W 6–1	1–2–0
January 17	vs. MIT*	Boston Arena • Boston, Massachusetts	L 1–2 ^{2OT}	1–3–0
January 26	vs. Boston College*	Boston Arena • Boston, Massachusetts	L 2–3 ^{3OT}	1–4–0
February 7	vs. Boston College*	Boston Arena • Boston, Massachusetts	L 2–7	1–5–0
February 8	at New Haven Bears*	New Haven Arena • New Haven, Connecticut	L 1–4	1–6–0
February 24	at Bates*	Auburn Rink • Auburn, Maine	W 6–0	2–6–0
*Non-conference game.

== Scoring statistics ==
Name	Position	Games	Goals
Joseph Almer	C/LW	-	7
George Sterling	D/LW	8	4
Harry McArdle	C/LW/RW	6	1
Carl Anderson	C	1	0
Louis Rosenfield		1	0
Mickey Cochrane	D	2	0
John Diehl	G	2	0
Frazier	D	3	0
Joe Beauchemin	G	8	0
Peter Kelley		-	0
William Wennerberg		-	0
Robert Blais	RW	-	-
Morey Kontoff	D	-	-
Rod Ling		-	-
Adolphus Provost	D/C/LW	-	-
Sherman	LW/RW	-	-
Total			22
