= 1922–23 Army Cadets men's ice hockey season =

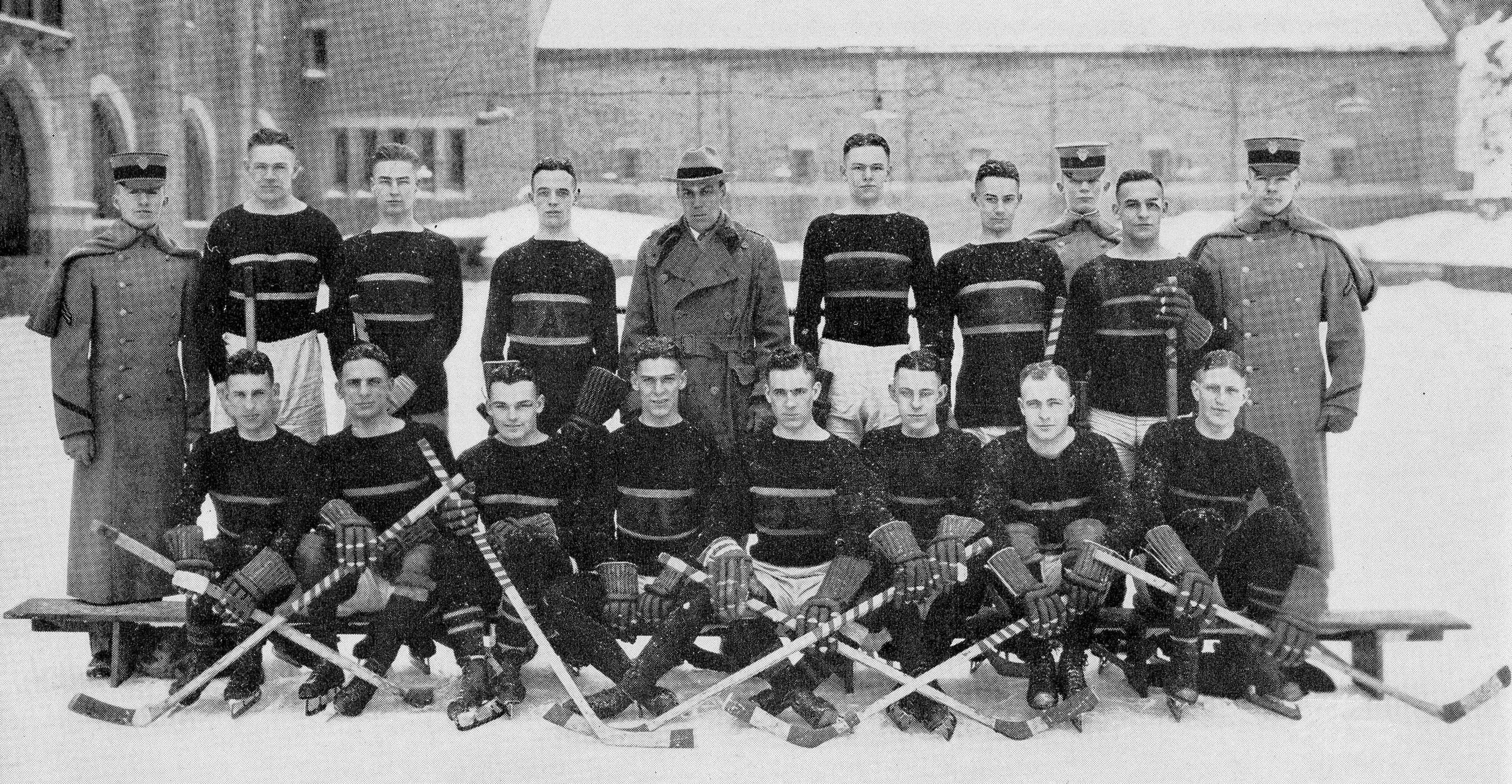
- Conference: Independent
- Home ice: Stuart Rink

Record
- Overall: 7–7–0
- Home: 7–7–0

Coaches and captains
- Head coach: Talbot Hunter
- Captain: Kevin O'Shea

The 1922–23 Army Cadets men's ice hockey season was the 20th season of play for the program. The team was coached by Talbot Hunter in his 3rd season.

== Season ==
Prior to the first game, Army was allowed to practice on the Hobey Baker Memorial Rink by Princeton. Since the Stuart Rink was not yet ready, this was critical to the progress of Army's team. While Kevin O'Shea was the only returning starter, the team coalesced swiftly around the forward combinations between O'Shea, Stevenson, Marinelli and Caywood. After New Years, consistent weather allowed army to play its full schedule of 14 games. Unfortunately, the cold temperatures, combined with the lack of seating at Stuart Rink, also restricted the size of the crowd at each of their games. With Baird providing capable goaltending, Army got off to a hot start, winning its first three games of the year. As their opposition become stronger, the Cadets began losing matches and they swiftly dropped down to a .500 record.

In early February, the defense put up a stout defense and Army was able to blank Dartmouth, defeating one of the best teams in the country. Army could not, however, sustain that effort and lost three of their last four games. While the cadets did break even with their record, the team's offense was limited to 1 goal or fewer in half of its games and would need to be better if Army was going to compete with the elite teams.

John Binns served as team manager with Charles Mason and Francis Graling as his assistants.

== Roster ==
No.	Nat.	Player	Class	Pos	Height	Weight	DoB	Hometown	Previous team
	(United States)	Willet J. Baird	Sophomore				1902-01-13	Cornwall-on-Hudson, New York
	(United States)	George R. Beane	Sophomore	G				Rhode Island
	(United States)	Lindsay P. Caywood	Junior	F			1900-02-19	Pittsburgh, Pennsylvania
	(United States)	Einar B. Gjelsteen	Senior	D			1900-10-18	Menominee, Michigan
	(United States)	Alvin A. Heidner	Freshman				1904-10-14	North Dakota
	(United States)	Robert C. Lawes	Junior				1899-07-06	Orange, New Jersey
	(United States)	Royal B. Lord	Senior				1899-09-13	Pawtucket, Rhode Island
	(United States)	Walter C. Marinelli	Junior	F				Calumet, Michigan
	(United States)	Raymond C. Maude	Freshman				1902-07-01	Framingham, Massachusetts
	(United States)	Kevin O'Shea (C)	Senior	F				New York, New York
	(United States)	John S. Sarcka	Sophomore					Vermont
	(United States)	Frederick F. Scheiffler	Freshman				1904-04-15	Alpena, Michigan
	(United States)	Charles G. Stevenson Jr.	Junior	F				Brooklyn, New York
	(United States)	Henry R. Westphalinger	Sophomore	D			1903-03-28	Saint Paul, Minnesota

== Standings ==
1922–23 Eastern Collegiate ice hockey standings
	Intercollegiate							Overall					
	GP	W	L	T	Pct.	GF	GA	GP	W	L	T	GF	GA
Amherst	8	4	3	1	.563	15	24	8	4	3	1	15	24
Army	11	5	6	0	.455	26	35	14	7	7	0	36	39
Bates	9	6	3	0	.667	34	25	12	8	4	0	56	32
Boston College	5	5	0	0	1.000	30	6	14	12	1	1	53	18
Boston University	7	2	5	0	.286	21	22	8	2	6	0	22	26
Bowdoin	6	3	3	0	.500	18	28	9	5	4	0	37	33
Clarkson	3	1	1	1	.500	3	14	6	2	3	1	18	28
Colby	6	2	4	0	.333	15	21	6	2	4	0	15	21
Columbia	9	0	9	0	.000	14	35	9	0	9	0	14	35
Cornell	6	1	3	2	.333	6	16	6	1	3	2	6	16
Dartmouth	12	10	2	0	.833	49	20	15	13	2	0	67	26
Hamilton	7	2	5	0	.286	20	34	10	4	6	0	37	53
Harvard	10	7	3	0	.700	27	11	12	8	4	0	34	19
Maine	6	2	4	0	.333	16	23	6	2	4	0	16	23
Massachusetts Agricultural	9	3	4	2	.444	13	24	9	3	4	2	13	24
Middlebury	3	0	3	0	.000	1	6	3	0	3	0	1	6
MIT	8	3	5	0	.375	16	52	8	3	5	0	16	52
Pennsylvania	6	1	4	1	.250	8	36	7	2	4	1	11	38
Princeton	15	11	4	0	.733	84	21	18	12	5	1	93	30
Rensselaer	5	1	4	0	.200	6	23	5	1	4	0	6	23
Saint Michael's	3	1	2	0	.333	4	5	–	–	–	–	–	–
Union	0	0	0	0	–	0	0	3	2	1	0	–	–
Williams	9	5	3	1	.611	33	17	10	6	3	1	40	17
Yale	13	9	4	0	.692	70	16	15	9	6	0	75	26

== Schedule and results ==
Date	Opponent	Site	Result	Record
Regular Season
January 6	Pennsylvania*	Stuart Rink • West Point, New York	W 2–1 ^{OT}	1–0–0
January 13	Amherst*	Stuart Rink • West Point, New York	W 2–1	2–0–0
January	Lafayette ^{†}*	Stuart Rink • West Point, New York	W 9–1	3–0–0
January 20	MIT*	Stuart Rink • West Point, New York	L 5–6	3–1–0
January 23	Bates*	Stuart Rink • West Point, New York	L 1–2	3–2–0
January	Albany Country Club*	Stuart Rink • West Point, New York	W 1–0	4–2–0
January 31	Princeton*	Stuart Rink • West Point, New York	L 2–6	4–3–0
February 3	Royal Military College*	Stuart Rink • West Point, New York	L 0–3	4–4–0
February 7	Dartmouth*	Stuart Rink • West Point, New York	W 1–0	5–4–0
February 10	Massachusetts Agricultural*	Stuart Rink • West Point, New York	L 1–2	5–5–0
February 10	Rensselaer*	Stuart Rink • West Point, New York	W 5–2	6–5–0
February 14	Columbia*	Stuart Rink • West Point, New York	W 5–1	7–5–0
February 17	Williams*	Stuart Rink • West Point, New York	L 1–5	7–6–0
February 21	Boston College*	Stuart Rink • West Point, New York	L 1–9	7–7–0
*Non-conference game.

† Lafayette was an unofficial club team.
