= 1922–23 Massachusetts Agricultural Aggies men's ice hockey season =

- Conference: Independent
- Home ice: Alumni Field Rink

Record
- Overall: 3–4–2
- Home: 1–0–1
- Road: 2–4–0
- Neutral: 0–0–1

Coaches and captains
- Head coach: Herbert Collins
- Captain: Doc Gordon

The 1922–23 Massachusetts Agricultural Aggies men's ice hockey season was the 15th season of play for the program. The Aggies were coached by Herbert Collins in his first season.

== Season ==
In late November, the hockey team held its first meeting and set about getting ready for the season. While the Aggies were looking at a difficult schedule that include some of the top college teams, MAC also had to deal with some off-ice upheaval. Elton Mansell, the team's leader for the past five years, was now gone. Herbert Collins took over as head coach, however, as he had played with the team over the previous four years the two were well acquainted with one another. The bigger issue was that just two lettermen (Doc Gordon and Shorty Hodsdon) were returning and Collins had to remake the team without a usable ice rink. The venue had been rebuilt by that time but the weather was not cold enough for the surface to freeze and the candidates were forced to train on the floor of Drill Hall. After returning from the winter break, the Aggies were happy to find that cold weather had arrived in the region and were able to get several practice sessions in before the first game.

Though their practice sessions may have been helpful, the raw team wasn't quite ready in time to face a strong Boston University outfit. Due to an illness, Hodsdon was only able to play for a few minutes in the match, leaving the defense in the lurch. Despite a solid game from Alger, the Aggies surrendered 6 goals in a game that was never close. The experience the team gained, however, seemed to work wonders as MAC was much more competitive in their next match. Originally, the Aggies were supposed to play at Williamstown but the game was moved due to a lack of ice on the Ephs home rink. The game was fast from the start and MAC looked like a completely different team. Hodsdon, now recovered, played the entire game and gave a big boost to the defense. The two teams traded goals in the first and second periods and were unable to break the deadlock in regulation. Overtime was needed and both continued to skate up and down the ice but neither goaltender would give an inch. After six 5-minute overtime periods and no further scoring, the teams agreed to call the game a draw. Nearly the same thing happened in the very next game when returned to face Amherst on their rink. This time it was only 1 goal per side that could be recorded but the result was the same. 30 minutes of overtime hockey was not enough to settle the score and both teams were too exhausted by the end to continue further.

A few days later, the Aggies played host to a rather unique team from the American School of Osteopathy. Hailing from Missouri, the osteopaths were taking a tour of the region and it was unknown if the match could be played due to rain leading up to the game. While the two were able to play, the poor condition of the ice slowed the pace down and limited the game to 12-minute periods. The only goal was scored by Gordon after a brilliant individual effort and gave the Aggies their first win of the year. Gordon kept rolling in the next game, scoring all three of the team's goals in their win over Cornell. Twice the Big Red managed to tie the score but Alger and Hodsdon combined to prevent a third marker and signify that the team had rounded into form.

Warm weather afterwards caused the postponement of the rematch with Amherst and hamstrung the team in their training for the contest with Dartmouth. By the time the Aggies made it to Hanover they were completely out of sorts and were swept off the ice by the Greens. It was only through a brilliant performance by Alger that limited Dartmouth to 5 goals. Afterwards, the ice rink in Amherst had recovered enough for the game with the Lord Jeffs to be held. On a brilliant play where he first stole the puck from a Sabrina and then dashed up the ice, Goldsmith fired the puck into the top corner of the net for his first goal of the year. Unfortunately, that was all MAC could produce and the team fell to their cross-town rivals.

Prospects for a win did not look good heading into the match with Army as MAC was still without usable ice and the Cadets had just shut down Dartmouth. Defying expectations, Gordon used a surprisingly fast surface to terrorize the West Pointers all night and even managed to open the scoring in the first period. Army tied the match early in the third but the work by Goldsmith prevented them from adding any more to their total. Goldsmith then turned defense into offense by stealing the puck in front of his own goal and skated up the ice. His rush ended with a shot from the middle of the ice that found its way into the cage and won the match for the Aggies. With a winning season in the balance, MAC headed south to take on Yale. The team was able to keep pace with the Bulldogs early as both outfits played a fast game. Captain Gordon tied the game in the first after his Yale counterpart started the scoring but the Elis managed a second goal before the frame was over. Yale was able to use its bevy of alternates to keep the blistering pace while the Aggies slowly succumbed. Down 1–4 entering the third, MAC got its second wind and attempted to stage a comeback but the Yale defense was too strong. The team was forced to concede defeat and returned home with a losing record.

Ernest Putnam served as team manager.

== Roster ==
No.	Nat.	Player	Class	Pos	Height	Weight	DoB	Hometown	Previous team
	(United States)	Mason W. Alger	Senior	G				West Bridgewater, Massachusetts
	(United States)	Eliot G. Goldsmith	Junior	D				Brookline, Massachusetts
	(United States)	Howard R. Gordon (C)	Senior	LW/RW				Ipswich, Massachusetts
	(United States)	Norman D. Hilyard	Senior	C/LW/RW			1900-09-11	Beverly, Massachusetts
	(United States)	Marshall S. Hodsdon	Senior	D/RW			1901-12-11	Melrose Highlands, Massachusetts
	(United States)	Eric F. Lamb	Junior	D/RW				Waban, Massachusetts
	(United States)	Arthur C. Nicholl	Junior	D/F				Quincy, Massachusetts
	(United States)	Charles J. Tewhill	Junior	D/LW			1899-08-06	Florence, Massachusetts
	(United States)	Holden Whitaker	Senior	C			1900-10-09	Newton Highlands, Massachusetts

== Standings ==
1922–23 Eastern Collegiate ice hockey standings
	Intercollegiate							Overall					
	GP	W	L	T	Pct.	GF	GA	GP	W	L	T	GF	GA
Amherst	8	4	3	1	.563	15	24	8	4	3	1	15	24
Army	11	5	6	0	.455	26	35	14	7	7	0	36	39
Bates	9	6	3	0	.667	34	25	12	8	4	0	56	32
Boston College	5	5	0	0	1.000	30	6	14	12	1	1	53	18
Boston University	7	2	5	0	.286	21	22	8	2	6	0	22	26
Bowdoin	6	3	3	0	.500	18	28	9	5	4	0	37	33
Clarkson	3	1	1	1	.500	3	14	6	2	3	1	18	28
Colby	6	2	4	0	.333	15	21	6	2	4	0	15	21
Columbia	9	0	9	0	.000	14	35	9	0	9	0	14	35
Cornell	6	1	3	2	.333	6	16	6	1	3	2	6	16
Dartmouth	12	10	2	0	.833	49	20	15	13	2	0	67	26
Hamilton	7	2	5	0	.286	20	34	10	4	6	0	37	53
Harvard	10	7	3	0	.700	27	11	12	8	4	0	34	19
Maine	6	2	4	0	.333	16	23	6	2	4	0	16	23
Massachusetts Agricultural	9	3	4	2	.444	13	24	9	3	4	2	13	24
Middlebury	3	0	3	0	.000	1	6	3	0	3	0	1	6
MIT	8	3	5	0	.375	16	52	8	3	5	0	16	52
Pennsylvania	6	1	4	1	.250	8	36	7	2	4	1	11	38
Princeton	15	11	4	0	.733	84	21	18	12	5	1	93	30
Rensselaer	5	1	4	0	.200	6	23	5	1	4	0	6	23
Saint Michael's	3	1	2	0	.333	4	5	–	–	–	–	–	–
Union	0	0	0	0	–	0	0	3	2	1	0	–	–
Williams	9	5	3	1	.611	33	17	10	6	3	1	40	17
Yale	13	9	4	0	.692	70	16	15	9	6	0	75	26

== Schedule and results ==
Date	Opponent	Site	Decision	Result	Record
Regular Season
January 11	at Boston University*	Boston Arena • Boston, Massachusetts	Alger	L 1–6	0–1–0
January 17	vs. Williams*	Commons Rink • Pittsfield, Massachusetts	Alger	T 2–2 ^{6OT ^{†}}	0–1–1
January 19	Amherst*	Alumni Field Rink • Amherst, Massachusetts	Alger	T 1–1 ^{6OT}	0–1–2
January 23	A.T. Still*	Alumni Field Rink • Amherst, Massachusetts	Alger	W 1–0	1–1–2
January 27	at Cornell*	Beebe Lake • Ithaca, New York	Alger	W 3–2	2–1–2
February 3	at Dartmouth*	Occom Pond • Hanover, New Hampshire	Alger	L 1–5	2–2–2
February 6	at Amherst*	Pratt Field Rink • Amherst, Massachusetts	Alger	L 1–3	2–3–2
February 10	at Army*	Stuart Rink • West Point, New York	Alger	W 2–1	3–3–2
February 14	at Yale*	New Haven Arena • New Haven, Connecticut	Alger	L 1–4	3–4–2
*Non-conference game.

† Williams records indicate that there were 3 overtime sessions at 10 minutes each.

== Scoring statistics ==
Name	Position	Games	Goals
Doc Gordon	LW/RW	9	8
Eliot Goldsmith	D	9	2
Eric Lamb	D/RW	9	2
Holden Whitaker	C	8	1
Chuck Tewhill	D/LW	4	0
Norman Hilyard	C/LW/RW	5	0
Art Nicholl	D/C/RW	6	0
Mase Alger	G	9	0
Shorty Hodsdon	D/RW	9	0
Total			13

== Goaltending statistics ==
Name	Games	Minutes	Wins	Losses	Ties	Goals Against	Saves	Shut Outs	SV %	GAA
Mase Alger	9	447	3	4	2	24		1		2.42
Total	9	447	3	4	2	24		1		2.42

Note: goals against average is based upon a 45-minute regulation game.
