= 1922–23 Columbia Lions men's ice hockey season =

1922-23 season was the 22nd season

- Home ice: Iceland Rink

Record
- Overall: 0–9–0
- Road: 0–5–0
- Neutral: 0–4–0

Coaches and captains
- Head coach: Tom Howard
- Captain: Walter Rollins

The 1922–23 Columbia men's ice hockey season was the 22nd season of play for the program.

== Season ==
Columbia started its second season under Tom Howard with a 3-game series against Dartmouth in Lake Placid, New York. they returned after Christmas against Amherst, looking for a better result. After a win over the Lord Jeffs, Columbia was hoping for a repeat performance against Princeton but instead the Tigers throttled the Lions by a 0–14 score. Coach Howard didn't allow the team to surrender after the embarrassing loss and ran the Lions through hard practices leading up to their next game against Pennsylvania. The work paid off with Columbia paying much more attention to their defensive game in a 2–0 win.

After another few weeks off the Lions travelled to upstate New York for a pair of games. Columbia earned a road split against two teams before heading to West Point to face Army. Despite concerns that the weather may not hold the game took place but the Lions fared poorly, losing the match 1–5.

In late February, however, news came to light that the team had committed several serious infractions. The team had played multiple ineligible players under false names after the Princeton game, a violation of sportsmanship and committee regulations in the eyes of Columbia University administration. Several members were disciplined and the remaining game on the schedule was abandoned. Columbia ultimately decided to forfeit all of their wins on the season.

Despite the scandal, the university was willing to continue to support the team. However, when a distinct lack of ice rinks became apparent the following November, Columbia announced that they were cancelling the season. The administration did say that they would bring the team back after one year if the rink situation had improved to their satisfaction, but the next game for the program wouldn't happen for almost 15 years.

== Roster ==
No.	Nat.	Player	Class	Pos	Height	Weight	DoB	Hometown	Previous team
		Marshall W. Baldwin	Junior	W
		Barthen	Freshman	D
		Folger		D
		Bill Gibb		G
		Frank Hanson	Sophomore	C
		Richard H. Marshall	Sophomore	LW
		Nash		D
		Mackey Rackow	Junior	D
		David B. Rogers	Senior	D/C					Acadia
		Walter Rollins (C)	Senior	RW
		Herman Wahlig	Junior	G

== Standings ==
1922–23 Eastern Collegiate ice hockey standings
	Intercollegiate							Overall					
	GP	W	L	T	Pct.	GF	GA	GP	W	L	T	GF	GA
Amherst	8	4	3	1	.563	15	24	8	4	3	1	15	24
Army	11	5	6	0	.455	26	35	14	7	7	0	36	39
Bates	9	6	3	0	.667	34	25	12	8	4	0	56	32
Boston College	5	5	0	0	1.000	30	6	14	12	1	1	53	18
Boston University	7	2	5	0	.286	21	22	8	2	6	0	22	26
Bowdoin	6	3	3	0	.500	18	28	9	5	4	0	37	33
Clarkson	3	1	1	1	.500	3	14	6	2	3	1	18	28
Colby	6	2	4	0	.333	15	21	6	2	4	0	15	21
Columbia	9	0	9	0	.000	14	35	9	0	9	0	14	35
Cornell	6	1	3	2	.333	6	16	6	1	3	2	6	16
Dartmouth	12	10	2	0	.833	49	20	15	13	2	0	67	26
Hamilton	7	2	5	0	.286	20	34	10	4	6	0	37	53
Harvard	10	7	3	0	.700	27	11	12	8	4	0	34	19
Maine	6	2	4	0	.333	16	23	6	2	4	0	16	23
Massachusetts Agricultural	9	3	4	2	.444	13	24	9	3	4	2	13	24
Middlebury	3	0	3	0	.000	1	6	3	0	3	0	1	6
MIT	8	3	5	0	.375	16	52	8	3	5	0	16	52
Pennsylvania	6	1	4	1	.250	8	36	7	2	4	1	11	38
Princeton	15	11	4	0	.733	84	21	18	12	5	1	93	30
Rensselaer	5	1	4	0	.200	6	23	5	1	4	0	6	23
Saint Michael's	3	1	2	0	.333	4	5	–	–	–	–	–	–
Union	0	0	0	0	–	0	0	3	2	1	0	–	–
Williams	9	5	3	1	.611	33	17	10	6	3	1	40	17
Yale	13	9	4	0	.692	70	16	15	9	6	0	75	26

== Schedule and results ==
Date	Opponent	Site	Result	Record
Regular Season
December 21	vs. Dartmouth*	Lake Placid Arena • Lake Placid, New York	L 1–2	0–1–0
December 22	vs. Dartmouth*	Lake Placid Arena • Lake Placid, New York	L 3–8	0–2–0
December 24	vs. Dartmouth*	Lake Placid Arena • Lake Placid, New York	L 0–2 ^{†}	0–3–0
January 12	vs. Amherst*	Iceland Rink • New York, New York	L 5–2 (forfeit)	0–4–0
January 17	at Princeton*	Hobey Baker Memorial Rink • Princeton, New Jersey	L 0–14	0–5–0
January 22	at Pennsylvania*	Philadelphia Ice Palace • Philadelphia, Pennsylvania	L 2–0 (forfeit)	0–6–0
February 9	at Cornell*	Beebe Lake • Ithaca, New York	L 1–0 (forfeit)	0–7–0
February 10	at Hamilton*	Russell Sage Rink • Clinton, New York	L 1–2	0–8–0
February 14	at Army*	Stuart Rink • West Point, New York	L 1–5	0–9–0
*Non-conference game.

† Dartmouth records have the score at 0–7 while contemporary accounts list the final as 0–2.
