= 1922–23 Middlebury Panthers men's ice hockey season =

- Conference: Independent
- Home ice: Middlebury Rink

Record
- Overall: 0–3–0
- Home: 0–1–0
- Road: 0–2–0

Coaches and captains
- Head coach: Erwin Drost

The 1922–23 Middlebury Panthers men's ice hockey season was the inaugural season of play for the program.

== Season ==
Increased interest by the student body caused Middlebury College to recognize ice hockey as a minor sport this season. The first game was swiftly arranged with Rensselaer and the team began to work on the temporary rink that had been built atop the tennis courts. The general lack of experience both with the game and with one another left the players handicapped in their opening match but the team still performed well. Middlebury limited the Engineers to just three goals and played aggressively despite their newness to the game.

Due to their late start, the team wasn't able to schedule another game for almost a month. However, The time in between games did give the Panthers a change to fine tune their game. When they finally travelled to play Saint Michael's, Middlebury looked far more composed and played the Purple Knights evenly all game. The offense had no ability to penetrate the St. Mike's defense and were restricted to long shots that missed more often than not. Fortunetely, the Panthers' defense was just as effective and neither team was able to score in regulation. During the overtime, a rink-length rush from Papineau resulted in the only goal of the game and gave Middlebury its second loss. The rematch wasn't long in coming as the two were set to play during Middlebury's Winter Carnival on the 22nd. Ross opened the scoring with the first goal in the program's history and had his team in the lead by the midway point of the game. Saint Michael's rallied with two goals in the second half to take the match but that didn't stop the first home game for the Panthers being a huge and popular success.

Erwin Drost served as team manager and head coach.

== Roster ==
No.	Nat.	Player	Class	Pos	Height	Weight	DoB	Hometown	Previous team
	(United States)	Stanton E. Ashley	Senior				1901-03-17	New Britain, Connecticut
	(United States)	Paris Fletcher	Junior	LW				Middlebury, Vermont
	(United States)	Elbert T. Gallagher	Senior	G				St. Johnsbury, Vermont
	(United States)	John J. Leary	Sophomore	D				Boston, Massachusetts
	(United States)	William J. McLaughlin	Freshman	D				Dorchester, Massachusetts
	(United States)	Donald Ross	Senior	RW				West Rutland, Vermont
	(United States)	Malcolm Ross	Senior	C				Rutland, Vermont
	(United States)	Edward S. Twitchell	Freshman	D				New Britain, Connecticut

== Standings ==
1922–23 Eastern Collegiate ice hockey standings
	Intercollegiate							Overall					
	GP	W	L	T	Pct.	GF	GA	GP	W	L	T	GF	GA
Amherst	8	4	3	1	.563	15	24	8	4	3	1	15	24
Army	11	5	6	0	.455	26	35	14	7	7	0	36	39
Bates	9	6	3	0	.667	34	25	12	8	4	0	56	32
Boston College	5	5	0	0	1.000	30	6	14	12	1	1	53	18
Boston University	7	2	5	0	.286	21	22	8	2	6	0	22	26
Bowdoin	6	3	3	0	.500	18	28	9	5	4	0	37	33
Clarkson	3	1	1	1	.500	3	14	6	2	3	1	18	28
Colby	6	2	4	0	.333	15	21	6	2	4	0	15	21
Columbia	9	0	9	0	.000	14	35	9	0	9	0	14	35
Cornell	6	1	3	2	.333	6	16	6	1	3	2	6	16
Dartmouth	12	10	2	0	.833	49	20	15	13	2	0	67	26
Hamilton	7	2	5	0	.286	20	34	10	4	6	0	37	53
Harvard	10	7	3	0	.700	27	11	12	8	4	0	34	19
Maine	6	2	4	0	.333	16	23	6	2	4	0	16	23
Massachusetts Agricultural	9	3	4	2	.444	13	24	9	3	4	2	13	24
Middlebury	3	0	3	0	.000	1	6	3	0	3	0	1	6
MIT	8	3	5	0	.375	16	52	8	3	5	0	16	52
Pennsylvania	6	1	4	1	.250	8	36	7	2	4	1	11	38
Princeton	15	11	4	0	.733	84	21	18	12	5	1	93	30
Rensselaer	5	1	4	0	.200	6	23	5	1	4	0	6	23
Saint Michael's	3	1	2	0	.333	4	5	–	–	–	–	–	–
Union	0	0	0	0	–	0	0	3	2	1	0	–	–
Williams	9	5	3	1	.611	33	17	10	6	3	1	40	17
Yale	13	9	4	0	.692	70	16	15	9	6	0	75	26

== Schedule and results ==
Date	Opponent	Site	Result	Record
Regular Season
January 20	at Rensselaer*	Russell Sage Rink • Troy, New York	L 0–3	0–1–0
February 17	at Saint Michael's*	Colchester, Vermont	L 0–1 ^{OT}	0–2–0
February 22	Saint Michael's*	Middlebury Rink • Middlebury, Vermont	L 1–2	0–3–0
*Non-conference game.
