= 1922–23 Cornell Big Red men's ice hockey season =

Intercollegiate hockey season

- Home ice: Beebe Lake

Record
- Overall: 0–4–2
- Home: 0–3–1
- Road: 0–1–1

Coaches and captains
- Head coach: Nick Bawlf
- Captain: Frank Tone

The 1922–23 Cornell Big Red men's ice hockey season was the 18th season of play for the program. The teams was coached by Nick Bawlf in his 3rd season.

== Season ==
After two good seasons, Cornell's third year back on the ice faced an uphill climb from the beginning. The team lost three of its stalwart players (Finn, Thornton and Wight) and would face a difficult task in replacing their talents. When the team was forming in early January, the team was further hamstring by the ineligibility of several potential replacement players. Coach Bawlf had no difficulty in finding students willing to play but the lack in quality led to grim projections for the season from the outset. Three returning players, Brockway, MacDonald and Tone, were known quantities for the Big Red but the rest of the potential lineup wasn't able to distinguish itself.

Despite concerns, Cornell opened their season well, losing to Dartmouth in overtime. The teams remained tied after three 12-minute periods but Dartmouth pulled away in overtime, scoring twice in the first 5-minute extra session. After a 0–0 tie against Clarkson the following week, The Big Red were handed their second loss of the season by MAC. Even will the poor start, Cornell was able to show that their defense was at least up to par.

After taking a week off for the semester break, the club returned with a game against Columbia. The forward roster was adjusted with Brockway going back to wing, where he had played last year, and Burnett and Davidson inserted into the starting lineup. Despite the changes, Cornell was unable to score and lost 0–1. A week later they hit the road and faced powerhouse Harvard. Though they fell 0–6, the Crimson were expected to be leagues ahead of the Big Red. The final game of the year came at Pennsylvania and Cornell was still unable to get a win, ending with a 2–2 tie after three extra periods.

Prior to the team's final game, Columbia had announced that it was forfeiting all of its victories on the year due to the team employing ineligible players in several games. One such game was the match with Cornell, giving the team their only win on the season, however, many Cornell records do not reflect this change and leave the match with the original outcome.

== Roster ==
No.	Nat.	Player	Class	Pos	Height	Weight	DoB	Hometown	Previous team
		Edward D. Betts	Junior
	(United States)	John D. Brockway	Senior	C/LW			1898-02-16	Syracuse, New York
	(United States)	Newton C. Burnett	Sophomore	C				Newton, Massachusetts
	(United States)	Charles L. Davidson	Senior	RW				Sault Ste. Marie, Michigan
	(Canada)	Russell W. Frost	Senior	LW/RW				Welland, Ontario
	(United States)	Charles L. MacDonald	Junior	LW/RW			1902-01-26	Duluth, Minnesota
		John G. Nesbett	Junior	D
	(United States)	Charles M. Stainton	Sophomore	G				Buffalo, New York
	(United States)	Frank J. Tone Jr. (C)	Junior	D			1901-03-30	Niagara Falls, New York
	(United States)	Richard C. Yates	Junior					Charlotte, New York

== Standings ==
1922–23 Eastern Collegiate ice hockey standings
	Intercollegiate							Overall					
	GP	W	L	T	Pct.	GF	GA	GP	W	L	T	GF	GA
Amherst	8	4	3	1	.563	15	24	8	4	3	1	15	24
Army	11	5	6	0	.455	26	35	14	7	7	0	36	39
Bates	9	6	3	0	.667	34	25	12	8	4	0	56	32
Boston College	5	5	0	0	1.000	30	6	14	12	1	1	53	18
Boston University	7	2	5	0	.286	21	22	8	2	6	0	22	26
Bowdoin	6	3	3	0	.500	18	28	9	5	4	0	37	33
Clarkson	3	1	1	1	.500	3	14	6	2	3	1	18	28
Colby	6	2	4	0	.333	15	21	6	2	4	0	15	21
Columbia	9	0	9	0	.000	14	35	9	0	9	0	14	35
Cornell	6	1	3	2	.333	6	16	6	1	3	2	6	16
Dartmouth	12	10	2	0	.833	49	20	15	13	2	0	67	26
Hamilton	7	2	5	0	.286	20	34	10	4	6	0	37	53
Harvard	10	7	3	0	.700	27	11	12	8	4	0	34	19
Maine	6	2	4	0	.333	16	23	6	2	4	0	16	23
Massachusetts Agricultural	9	3	4	2	.444	13	24	9	3	4	2	13	24
Middlebury	3	0	3	0	.000	1	6	3	0	3	0	1	6
MIT	8	3	5	0	.375	16	52	8	3	5	0	16	52
Pennsylvania	6	1	4	1	.250	8	36	7	2	4	1	11	38
Princeton	15	11	4	0	.733	84	21	18	12	5	1	93	30
Rensselaer	5	1	4	0	.200	6	23	5	1	4	0	6	23
Saint Michael's	3	1	2	0	.333	4	5	–	–	–	–	–	–
Union	0	0	0	0	–	0	0	3	2	1	0	–	–
Williams	9	5	3	1	.611	33	17	10	6	3	1	40	17
Yale	13	9	4	0	.692	70	16	15	9	6	0	75	26

== Schedule and results ==
Date	Opponent	Site	Result	Record
Regular season
January 13	Dartmouth*	Beebe Lake • Ithaca, New York	L 2–4 ^{2OT}	0–1–0
January 20	Clarkson*	Beebe Lake • Ithaca, New York	T 0–0	0–1–1
January 27	Massachusetts Agricultural*	Beebe Lake • Ithaca, New York	L 2–3	0–2–1
February 9	Columbia*	Beebe Lake • Ithaca, New York	W 0–1 ^{forfeit}	1–2–1
February 17	at Harvard*	Boston Arena • Boston, Massachusetts	L 0–6	1–3–1
February 22	at Pennsylvania*	Philadelphia Ice Palace • Philadelphia, Pennsylvania	T 2–2 ^{3OT}	1–3–2
*Non-conference game.
