= 1922–23 United States collegiate men's ice hockey season =

- Duration: December 1922 –March 1923
- East Collegiate champion: Boston College
- West Collegiate champion: Minnesota

The 1922–23 United States collegiate men's ice hockey season was the 29th season of collegiate ice hockey in the United States.

== Regular season ==
=== Standings ===
1922–23 Eastern Collegiate ice hockey standings
	Intercollegiate							Overall					
	GP	W	L	T	Pct.	GF	GA	GP	W	L	T	GF	GA
Amherst	8	4	3	1	.563	15	24	8	4	3	1	15	24
Army	11	5	6	0	.455	26	35	14	7	7	0	36	39
Bates	9	6	3	0	.667	34	25	12	8	4	0	56	32
Boston College	5	5	0	0	1.000	30	6	14	12	1	1	53	18
Boston University	7	2	5	0	.286	21	22	8	2	6	0	22	26
Bowdoin	6	3	3	0	.500	18	28	9	5	4	0	37	33
Clarkson	3	1	1	1	.500	3	14	6	2	3	1	18	28
Colby	6	2	4	0	.333	15	21	6	2	4	0	15	21
Columbia	9	0	9	0	.000	14	35	9	0	9	0	14	35
Cornell	6	1	3	2	.333	6	16	6	1	3	2	6	16
Dartmouth	12	10	2	0	.833	49	20	15	13	2	0	67	26
Hamilton	7	2	5	0	.286	20	34	10	4	6	0	37	53
Harvard	10	7	3	0	.700	27	11	12	8	4	0	34	19
Maine	6	2	4	0	.333	16	23	6	2	4	0	16	23
Massachusetts Agricultural	9	3	4	2	.444	13	24	9	3	4	2	13	24
Middlebury	3	0	3	0	.000	1	6	3	0	3	0	1	6
MIT	8	3	5	0	.375	16	52	8	3	5	0	16	52
Pennsylvania	6	1	4	1	.250	8	36	7	2	4	1	11	38
Princeton	15	11	4	0	.733	84	21	18	12	5	1	93	30
Rensselaer	5	1	4	0	.200	6	23	5	1	4	0	6	23
Saint Michael's	3	1	2	0	.333	4	5	–	–	–	–	–	–
Union	0	0	0	0	–	0	0	3	2	1	0	–	–
Williams	9	5	3	1	.611	33	17	10	6	3	1	40	17
Yale	13	9	4	0	.692	70	16	15	9	6	0	75	26

1922–23 Western Collegiate ice hockey standings
	Intercollegiate							Overall					
	GP	W	L	T	Pct.	GF	GA	GP	W	L	T	GF	GA
A.T. Still	–	–	–	–	–	–	–	–	–	–	–	–	–
Carleton	1	0	1	0	.000	1	4	2	0	2	0	4	14
Hamline	1	1	0	0	1.000	4	1	2	1	1	0	5	3
Marquette	5	0	3	2	.200	8	13	5	0	3	2	8	13
Michigan	10	4	6	0	.400	13	23	11	4	7	0	14	27
Michigan College of Mines	4	0	4	0	.000	8	22	4	0	4	0	8	22
Minnesota	11	9	1	1	.864	36	13	12	10	1	1	42	14
Notre Dame	7	6	1	0	.857	25	11	9	7	2	0	30	18
St. Thomas	6	3	3	0	.500	17	14	9	5	4	0	22	15
Wisconsin	–	–	–	–	–	–	–	11	3	5	3	–	–

1922–23 Triangular Hockey League standings
	Conference								Overall					
	GP	W	L	T	PTS	SW	GF	GA	GP	W	L	T	GF	GA
Harvard *	6	4	2	0	.667	2	9	10	12	8	4	0	34	19
Yale	6	3	3	0	.500	1	13	10	15	9	6	0	75	26
Princeton	6	2	4	0	.333	0	9	11	18	12	5	1	93	30
* indicates conference champion
