= 1922–23 Hamilton Continentals men's ice hockey season =

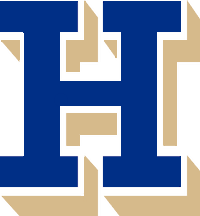
- Conference: Independent
- Home ice: Russell Sage Rink

Record
- Overall: 4–6–0

Coaches and captains
- Head coach: Albert Prettyman
- Captain: Watson Thompson

The 1922–23 Hamilton Continentals men's ice hockey season was the 5th season of play for the program. The Continentals represented Hamilton College and were coached by Albert Prettyman in his 5th season.

== Season ==
For the team's fifth season, Hamilton put together a very ambitions schedule of games. After opening with two matches against amateur clubs, the Continentals took on two ivy league teams that were routinely competing for the intercollegiate championship. After a loss to Dartmouth, who would end as the runners-up for the eastern championship, Hamilton travelled to Princeton for their first road game of the year. Captain Thompson scored twice, but Hamilton ultimately lost to the Tigers.

After the loss, the team took time off for the exam break before resume their season in early February. They won their first game back against Clarkson. A week later the team defeated Columbia.

The Continentals hosted Queen's, the world's oldest college program, in the middle of February. The team did well to score 4 goals against the Canadians but ultimately fell in the match. The next week Hamilton faced off against Boston College, who were undefeated to that point, and Hamilton proved to be just a bump in the road. The Blue and Buff were hardly able to compete with the Eagles, who would go on to claim the intercollegiate championship of the east at season's end. Two days later, the team travelled south to face another perennial powerhouse in Yale and were flattened by the Elis. Hamilton wasn't able to get any traction in the game and had to return home after a 0–8 drubbing.

The final game of the season came in early March and soft ice prevented the team from using their home rink effectively. Due to the conditions, the game was limited to four 10-minute periods. Williams, who was much more used to playing on poor ice, had an easier time navigating up and down the rank and managed to limit the Continentals' chances. The only goal from the home team came when the visiting netminder was serving one of his two penalties for dropping to the ice and covering the puck but it was not enough for Hamilton to stave off defeat and end the year with a losing record.

H. Louis George served as team manager.

== Roster ==
| No. | Nat. | Player | Class | Pos | Height | Weight | DoB | Hometown | Previous team |
|---|---|---|---|---|---|---|---|---|---|
| | (United States) | L. Danforth Bates | Junior | D | | | | Jamaica, New York |
| | (United States) | George A. Marks | Junior | G | | | | Old Forge, New York |
| | (United States) | Frank W. Marlow | Senior | D | | | 1902-01-23 | Syracuse, New York |
| | (United States) | Burton S. Price | Senior | | | | | New Rochelle, New York |
| | | A. Russell Thompson | Sophomore | RW |
| | (United States) | Watson M. Thompson (C) | Senior | C/LW | | | | Jamaica, New York |
| | (United States) | Harvey H. Valentine | Sophomore | D/C | | | 1904-10-22 | Wading River, New York |
| | (United States) | Joseph C. Valentine | Sophomore | RW | | | 1902-03-17 | Wading River, New York |
| | | Gilbert L. Van Vleet | Freshman | D |
| | (United States) | Harry D. Yates | Sophomore | C/LW | | | 1903-07-21 | Buffalo, New York |

== Standings ==
1922–23 Eastern Collegiate ice hockey standings
| | Intercollegiate | | | | | | | Overall | | | | | |
| | GP | W | L | T | Pct. | GF | GA | GP | W | L | T | GF | GA |
|---|---|---|---|---|---|---|---|---|---|---|---|---|---|
| Amherst | 8 | 4 | 3 | 1 | .563 | 15 | 24 | 8 | 4 | 3 | 1 | 15 | 24 |
| Army | 11 | 5 | 6 | 0 | .455 | 26 | 35 | 14 | 7 | 7 | 0 | 36 | 39 |
| Bates | 9 | 6 | 3 | 0 | .667 | 34 | 25 | 12 | 8 | 4 | 0 | 56 | 32 |
| Boston College | 5 | 5 | 0 | 0 | 1.000 | 30 | 6 | 14 | 12 | 1 | 1 | 53 | 18 |
| Boston University | 7 | 2 | 5 | 0 | .286 | 21 | 22 | 8 | 2 | 6 | 0 | 22 | 26 |
| Bowdoin | 6 | 3 | 3 | 0 | .500 | 18 | 28 | 9 | 5 | 4 | 0 | 37 | 33 |
| Clarkson | 3 | 1 | 1 | 1 | .500 | 3 | 14 | 6 | 2 | 3 | 1 | 18 | 28 |
| Colby | 6 | 2 | 4 | 0 | .333 | 15 | 21 | 6 | 2 | 4 | 0 | 15 | 21 |
| Columbia | 9 | 0 | 9 | 0 | .000 | 14 | 35 | 9 | 0 | 9 | 0 | 14 | 35 |
| Cornell | 6 | 1 | 3 | 2 | .333 | 6 | 16 | 6 | 1 | 3 | 2 | 6 | 16 |
| Dartmouth | 12 | 10 | 2 | 0 | .833 | 49 | 20 | 15 | 13 | 2 | 0 | 67 | 26 |
| Hamilton | 7 | 2 | 5 | 0 | .286 | 20 | 34 | 10 | 4 | 6 | 0 | 37 | 53 |
| Harvard | 10 | 7 | 3 | 0 | .700 | 27 | 11 | 12 | 8 | 4 | 0 | 34 | 19 |
| Maine | 6 | 2 | 4 | 0 | .333 | 16 | 23 | 6 | 2 | 4 | 0 | 16 | 23 |
| Massachusetts Agricultural | 9 | 3 | 4 | 2 | .444 | 13 | 24 | 9 | 3 | 4 | 2 | 13 | 24 |
| Middlebury | 3 | 0 | 3 | 0 | .000 | 1 | 6 | 3 | 0 | 3 | 0 | 1 | 6 |
| MIT | 8 | 3 | 5 | 0 | .375 | 16 | 52 | 8 | 3 | 5 | 0 | 16 | 52 |
| Pennsylvania | 6 | 1 | 4 | 1 | .250 | 8 | 36 | 7 | 2 | 4 | 1 | 11 | 38 |
| Princeton | 15 | 11 | 4 | 0 | .733 | 84 | 21 | 18 | 12 | 5 | 1 | 93 | 30 |
| Rensselaer | 5 | 1 | 4 | 0 | .200 | 6 | 23 | 5 | 1 | 4 | 0 | 6 | 23 |
| Saint Michael's | 3 | 1 | 2 | 0 | .333 | 4 | 5 | – | – | – | – | – | – |
| Union | 0 | 0 | 0 | 0 | – | 0 | 0 | 3 | 2 | 1 | 0 | – | – |
| Williams | 9 | 5 | 3 | 1 | .611 | 33 | 17 | 10 | 6 | 3 | 1 | 40 | 17 |
| Yale | 13 | 9 | 4 | 0 | .692 | 70 | 16 | 15 | 9 | 6 | 0 | 75 | 26 |

== Schedule and results ==
| Date | Opponent | Site | Result | Record |
Regular Season
| December 16 | Nichols Hockey Club* | Russell Sage Rink • Clinton, New York | W 5–4 | 1–0–0 |
| January 6 | Donnacona Hockey Club* | Russell Sage Rink • Clinton, New York | W 8–6 | 2–0–0 |
| January 13 | Dartmouth* | Russell Sage Rink • Clinton, New York | L 2–6 | 2–1–0 |
| January 20 | at Princeton* | Hobey Baker Memorial Rink • Princeton, New Jersey | L 2–10 | 2–2–0 |
| February 2 | Clarkson* | Russell Sage Rink • Clinton, New York | W 12–0 | 3–2–0 |
| February 10 | Columbia* | Russell Sage Rink • Clinton, New York | W 2–1 | 4–2–0 |
| February 17 | Queen's* | Russell Sage Rink • Clinton, New York | L 4–9 | 4–3–0 |
| February 22 | Boston College* | Russell Sage Rink • Clinton, New York | L 1–7 | 4–4–0 |
| February 24 | at Yale* | New Haven Arena • New Haven, Connecticut | L 0–8 | 4–5–0 |
| March 3 | Williams* | Russell Sage Rink • Clinton, New York | L 1–2 | 4–6–0 |
*Non-conference game.
