= 1922–23 Maine Black Bears men's ice hockey season =

- Conference: Independent
- Home ice: Alumni Field Rink

Record
- Overall: 2–4–0
- Home: 1–2–0
- Road: 1–2–0

Coaches and captains
- Head coach: Cuddy Murphy
- Captain: Drew Stearns

The 1922–23 Maine Black Bears men's ice hockey season was the inaugural season of play for the program.

== Season ==
In late November, the athletic department decided to assume control of the ice hockey team from the intramural association. This formalized the adoption of the sport by Maine and began the first varsity campaign in program history. By early December, Cuddy Murphy had been chosen to coach the team and a schedule was put together with a fairly ambitious slate. Two games would be played with each of the three other Maine schools (Bates, Bowdoin and Colby) while several matches with schools from Massachusetts were in the works. While it was assumed at the time that the program would begin as a minor sport, the university decided to allow the student body to make the ultimate determination.

Unfortunately, a warm winter caused many of the potential games to be either scrapped or delayed. Maine wasn't able to play its first game until February and, even then, the team had precious little time on the ice. In spite of these problems, the team didn't look bad in their loss to Colby. Before the match began, the two captains agreed to not have the outcome determine which of the two would play Bates at the Winter Carnival. Since the two were going to play a week later and Maine still needed some practice time on the ice they agreed to let the rematch decide that instead. A boisterous crowd was on hand for the Bears' first home game and the team provided their fans with the program's first victory. Drew Stearns was elected team captain just before the game and he responded by assisting on the final two goals to give the Black Bears a comeback win and a date with the Garnet in Augusta.

Maine switched their lineup for the Bates match by moving Stearns to wing, Elliott to center and Coakley to defense. The hastily altered group faced off against the best team in the state. Somehow, the defense held strong and allowed just a single goal to the Garnet. Stearns scored two goals for the second game in a row and led the team to victory while also putting them into a position to potentially win the state title. Afterwards, Maine travelled to meet Bowdoin and suffered a defeat at the hands of the Polar Bears. Stover and Stone were dropped back to defense while Mackay moved up to wing. The changes kept the two teams close for most of the match though Bowdoin held a narrow 3–2 lead at the start of the third. Maine's defensive effort collapsed in the final frame and they surrendered 4 goals to make the game seem more lopsided that it actually was.

A week later, the rematch with Bowdoin was held on poor ice but that didn't appear to slow down either team. After Stover started off the scoring twice in the first, Stearns grew the lead to 3 before the frame was out and Maine had a commanding lead after just 13 minutes. The Polar Bear surged back in the second and Maine was unable to stop the visitors from netting 4 goals in a stunning reversal of fortune. The choppy ice finally came into play in the third and helped prevent any more goals from being scored. The loss made it impossible for Maine to win the state championship but that didn't stop them from putting forth a valiant effort against Bates. The two fought bitterly with the Garnet still vying for the state title. Maine built a 2-goal lead thanks goals from Elliott and Stearns in the opening period. Bates cut the lead in half before the first intermission but Elliott restored the 2-goal margin early in the second. After Stearns got set off for a penalty, Bates came storming back and tied the game before the start of the third. The two exchanged goals early in the period but were unable to settle the score and overtime was required. The teams agreed to play two 5-minute periods but it wasn't until the end of the second that the winning goal was scored. Unfortunately, the puck was sent behind Baxter and Maine ended its season with another heartbreaking loss.

Hampton Bryant served as team manager.

== Roster ==
No.	Nat.	Player	Class	Pos	Height	Weight	DoB	Hometown	Previous team
	(United States)	Charles L. Baxter	Freshman	G				Rockland, Massachusetts
	(United States)	Roger G. Coakley	Freshman	D			1898-05-17	Beverly, Massachusetts
	(United States)	Wilmer R. Elliott	Sophomore	D/F			1903-06-21	Patten, Maine
	(United States)	John R. Foster	Sophomore	G				Roxbury, Massachusetts
	(United States)	Roger D. Mackay	Junior	D/LW				Dorchester, Massachusetts
	(United States)	Drew T. Stearns (C)	Junior	C/LW			1899-08-11	Hebron, Maine
	(United States)	Roger B. Stone	Freshman	D/LW			1901-11-11	Swampscott, Massachusetts
	(United States)	Clyde N. Stover	Freshman	D/RW			1903-03-06	York Beach, Maine

== Standings ==
1922–23 Eastern Collegiate ice hockey standings
	Intercollegiate							Overall					
	GP	W	L	T	Pct.	GF	GA	GP	W	L	T	GF	GA
Amherst	8	4	3	1	.563	15	24	8	4	3	1	15	24
Army	11	5	6	0	.455	26	35	14	7	7	0	36	39
Bates	9	6	3	0	.667	34	25	12	8	4	0	56	32
Boston College	5	5	0	0	1.000	30	6	14	12	1	1	53	18
Boston University	7	2	5	0	.286	21	22	8	2	6	0	22	26
Bowdoin	6	3	3	0	.500	18	28	9	5	4	0	37	33
Clarkson	3	1	1	1	.500	3	14	6	2	3	1	18	28
Colby	6	2	4	0	.333	15	21	6	2	4	0	15	21
Columbia	9	0	9	0	.000	14	35	9	0	9	0	14	35
Cornell	6	1	3	2	.333	6	16	6	1	3	2	6	16
Dartmouth	12	10	2	0	.833	49	20	15	13	2	0	67	26
Hamilton	7	2	5	0	.286	20	34	10	4	6	0	37	53
Harvard	10	7	3	0	.700	27	11	12	8	4	0	34	19
Maine	6	2	4	0	.333	16	23	6	2	4	0	16	23
Massachusetts Agricultural	9	3	4	2	.444	13	24	9	3	4	2	13	24
Middlebury	3	0	3	0	.000	1	6	3	0	3	0	1	6
MIT	8	3	5	0	.375	16	52	8	3	5	0	16	52
Pennsylvania	6	1	4	1	.250	8	36	7	2	4	1	11	38
Princeton	15	11	4	0	.733	84	21	18	12	5	1	93	30
Rensselaer	5	1	4	0	.200	6	23	5	1	4	0	6	23
Saint Michael's	3	1	2	0	.333	4	5	–	–	–	–	–	–
Union	0	0	0	0	–	0	0	3	2	1	0	–	–
Williams	9	5	3	1	.611	33	17	10	6	3	1	40	17
Yale	13	9	4	0	.692	70	16	15	9	6	0	75	26

== Schedule and results ==
Date	Opponent	Site	Result	Record
Regular Season
February 3	at Colby*	South End Arena • Waterville, Maine	L 2–4	0–1–0
February 9	at Colby*	Alumni Field Rink • Orono, Maine	W 3–2	1–1–0
February 14	vs. Bates*	Capital Park Rink • Augusta, Maine	W 2–1	2–1–0
February 17	at Bowdoin*	Delta Rink • Brunswick, Maine	L 2–7	2–2–0
February 24	Bowdoin*	Alumni Field Rink • Orono, Maine	L 3–4	2–3–0
February 27	Bates*	Alumni Field Rink • Orono, Maine	L 4–5 ^{2OT}	2–4–0
*Non-conference game.

Note: Maine archives differ from contemporary accounts about the dates and number of games.

== Scoring statistics ==
Name	Position	Games	Goals
Drew Stearns	C/LW	6	7
Clyde Stover	D/RW	6	4
Roger Stone	D/LW	4	3
Wilmer Elliott	D/C/RW	6	2
John Foster	G	1	0
Roger Coakley	D	5	0
Charles Baxter	G	6	0
Roger Mackay	D/LW	6	0
Total			16
