= 1922–23 Union Skating Dutchmen ice hockey season =

- Conference: Independent
- Home ice: Union Rink

Record
- Overall: 2–1–0
- Road: 2–0–0
- Neutral: 0–1–0

Coaches and captains
- Head coach: Elmer Oliphant
- Captain: Don Dold

The 1922–23 Union Skating Dutchmen men's ice hockey season was the 10th season of play for the program. The Skating Dutchmen represented Union College and were coached by Elmer Oliphant in his 1st season.

== Season ==
The hockey team received welcome news early in the year when the school decided to build a new temporary skating rink on the campus tennis courts. Unfortunately, poor weather conditions delayed the start of practice and caused the surface to be rough and slow. The season was set to begin just a few days after the first session was finally held but the team had more to play for than wins alone; the very future of the program was at stake. In 1920, the school had reportedly spent several hundred dollars on the program with little to show for their investment. After returning in '22, the team had drawn enough interest for Union to try once more and would need to see some potential for them to sign of on setting up an intercollegiate schedule.

Knowing what was on the line for the program, the team kicked off the season in style with an impressive win over the Schenectady Wanderers, a local amateur club. After the two other Schenectady teams were forced to cancel games, the rematch with the Wanderers a week later became an impromptu championship match. Though the score was closer, the second win by Union gave the Dutchmen the city championship. Union had a few weeks to prepare for their final game of the season, a trip to Albany to play the local country club. While the team lost its final match, and had several more canceled due to poor weather, the team had made enough of an impression on the athletic department for the team to return the following year.

Dick Meyer served as team manager.

== Roster ==
No.	Nat.	Player	Class	Pos	Height	Weight	DoB	Hometown	Previous team
		Bates Bishop
		Jackson S. Bishop
		John V. Dolan
		Donald T. Dold (C)
		William F. La Pan
		Hugh J. Slattery
		Nelson R. Zeitler

== Standings ==
1922–23 Eastern Collegiate ice hockey standings
	Intercollegiate							Overall					
	GP	W	L	T	Pct.	GF	GA	GP	W	L	T	GF	GA
Amherst	8	4	3	1	.563	15	24	8	4	3	1	15	24
Army	11	5	6	0	.455	26	35	14	7	7	0	36	39
Bates	9	6	3	0	.667	34	25	12	8	4	0	56	32
Boston College	5	5	0	0	1.000	30	6	14	12	1	1	53	18
Boston University	7	2	5	0	.286	21	22	8	2	6	0	22	26
Bowdoin	6	3	3	0	.500	18	28	9	5	4	0	37	33
Clarkson	3	1	1	1	.500	3	14	6	2	3	1	18	28
Colby	6	2	4	0	.333	15	21	6	2	4	0	15	21
Columbia	9	0	9	0	.000	14	35	9	0	9	0	14	35
Cornell	6	1	3	2	.333	6	16	6	1	3	2	6	16
Dartmouth	12	10	2	0	.833	49	20	15	13	2	0	67	26
Hamilton	7	2	5	0	.286	20	34	10	4	6	0	37	53
Harvard	10	7	3	0	.700	27	11	12	8	4	0	34	19
Maine	6	2	4	0	.333	16	23	6	2	4	0	16	23
Massachusetts Agricultural	9	3	4	2	.444	13	24	9	3	4	2	13	24
Middlebury	3	0	3	0	.000	1	6	3	0	3	0	1	6
MIT	8	3	5	0	.375	16	52	8	3	5	0	16	52
Pennsylvania	6	1	4	1	.250	8	36	7	2	4	1	11	38
Princeton	15	11	4	0	.733	84	21	18	12	5	1	93	30
Rensselaer	5	1	4	0	.200	6	23	5	1	4	0	6	23
Saint Michael's	3	1	2	0	.333	4	5	–	–	–	–	–	–
Union	0	0	0	0	–	0	0	3	2	1	0	–	–
Williams	9	5	3	1	.611	33	17	10	6	3	1	40	17
Yale	13	9	4	0	.692	70	16	15	9	6	0	75	26

== Schedule and results ==
Date	Opponent	Site	Result	Record
Regular Season
January 20	Schenectady Wanderers*	Union Rink • Schenectady, New York	W 6–1	1–0–0
January 27	Schenectady Wanderers*	Union Rink • Schenectady, New York	W 4–2	2–0–0
February 17	at Albany Country Club*	Country Club Rink • Albany, New York	L ?	2–1–0
*Non-conference game.
