= 1922–23 Harvard Crimson men's ice hockey season =

College ice hockey season

Triangular Hockey League, Champion
- Conference: 1st Triangular League
- Home ice: Boston Arena

Record
- Overall: 8–4–0
- Conference: 4–2–0
- Home: 3–4–0
- Road: 3–0–0
- Neutral: 2–0–0

Coaches and captains
- Head coach: William Claflin
- Captain: George Owen

The 1922–23 Harvard Crimson men's ice hockey season was the 25th season of play for the program.

== Season ==
At the start of their season, the Harvard Crimson did not demonstrate a strong offensive game. They were only able to defeat a weak BU squad 2–0 (albeit with a large number of alternates) and then managed just three goals in regulation against Toronto. When they began their conference schedule in mid-January the Crimson fell to Princeton for the first time since 1917 after only being able to muster a single goal. Harvard escaped with a win in the following game against Yale after another regulation with just a single goal scored.

While it may have appeared that Harvard was back to it dominating self after trouncing MIT 10–0, they were back to close games after a 19-day layoff. The Crimson defense remained stout through the remainder of the season, allowing just 6 goals in it final six games, but the offense was shut out twice and it was the meeting with Dartmouth on 21 February that cost Harvard dearly. The Dartmouth squad was one of the strongest in the nation and entered the contest with a record of 12–1. Harvard could ill afford a loss if they wanted to capture the intercollegiate title, but the offense was silenced by the Indians and the Crimson would be unable to claim another ice hockey championship.

Despite the offensive struggles, Harvard won three of their final four games, including the rubber matches against both Princeton and Yale to earn the Triangular League title. They also receive a bit of help from the Tigers, who downed Dartmouth in the final game for the Indians. The loss meant that Harvard, Dartmouth and Princeton were in a three-way tie with one another and a claim by any for the intercollegiate championship would be dubious at best.

In the team's final game of the season coach Clafin, in concert with captain Owen, invented a new strategy by changing all three forwards at the same time. This method would come to be called a 'line change' and is still used in modern hockey. While it is unknown whether or not the scheme had been used before, it was certainly the first time it had been employed in college hockey.

== Roster ==
No.	Nat.	Player	Class	Pos	Height	Weight	DoB	Hometown	Previous team
		William M. Austin	Sophomore	C/LW
	(United States)	Edward M. Beals Jr.	Sophomore	C/LW/RW
	(United States)	Chandler Bigelow	Junior	G				Boston, Massachusetts
		Henry M. Bohlen	Sophomore	D			1902-12-13
		Nelson Cabot	Junior	LW/RW
		Philip W. Chase	Sophomore	D
	(United States)	William E. Crosby Jr.	Junior	C/D				West Newton, Massachusetts
		J. H. Dempsey	Senior	RW
	(United States)	John G. Flint	Senior	G				Boston, Massachusetts
	(United States)	Harrison Gardner	Junior	C				Boston, Massachusetts
	(England)	Sidney C. Graves	Junior	LW/D			1901-07-21
		George C. Guild	Senior	C/RW
		John W. Hammond	Sophomore	RW/D
	(United States)	Francis S. Hill	Junior	C/LW/RW			1900-12-14	Boston, Massachusetts
	(United States)	Joseph Larocque Jr.	Senior	C/RW				Bernardsville, New Jersey
		J. J. Lee	Junior	LW/RW
	(United States)	George Owen Jr. (C)	Senior	C/LW/D	5' 11" (1.8 m)	190 lb (86 kg)	1901-12-02	Hamilton, Ontario
		Palmer		RW
		C. L. Pierson	Sophomore	LW/RW
		Laurence O. Pratt	Freshman	D			1904-05-07
	(United States)	George G. Walker	Junior	LW			1900-12-14	Richmond, New York	St. Paul's School

== Standings ==
1922–23 Eastern Collegiate ice hockey standings
	Intercollegiate							Overall					
	GP	W	L	T	Pct.	GF	GA	GP	W	L	T	GF	GA
Amherst	8	4	3	1	.563	15	24	8	4	3	1	15	24
Army	11	5	6	0	.455	26	35	14	7	7	0	36	39
Bates	9	6	3	0	.667	34	25	12	8	4	0	56	32
Boston College	5	5	0	0	1.000	30	6	14	12	1	1	53	18
Boston University	7	2	5	0	.286	21	22	8	2	6	0	22	26
Bowdoin	6	3	3	0	.500	18	28	9	5	4	0	37	33
Clarkson	3	1	1	1	.500	3	14	6	2	3	1	18	28
Colby	6	2	4	0	.333	15	21	6	2	4	0	15	21
Columbia	9	0	9	0	.000	14	35	9	0	9	0	14	35
Cornell	6	1	3	2	.333	6	16	6	1	3	2	6	16
Dartmouth	12	10	2	0	.833	49	20	15	13	2	0	67	26
Hamilton	7	2	5	0	.286	20	34	10	4	6	0	37	53
Harvard	10	7	3	0	.700	27	11	12	8	4	0	34	19
Maine	6	2	4	0	.333	16	23	6	2	4	0	16	23
Massachusetts Agricultural	9	3	4	2	.444	13	24	9	3	4	2	13	24
Middlebury	3	0	3	0	.000	1	6	3	0	3	0	1	6
MIT	8	3	5	0	.375	16	52	8	3	5	0	16	52
Pennsylvania	6	1	4	1	.250	8	36	7	2	4	1	11	38
Princeton	15	11	4	0	.733	84	21	18	12	5	1	93	30
Rensselaer	5	1	4	0	.200	6	23	5	1	4	0	6	23
Saint Michael's	3	1	2	0	.333	4	5	–	–	–	–	–	–
Union	0	0	0	0	–	0	0	3	2	1	0	–	–
Williams	9	5	3	1	.611	33	17	10	6	3	1	40	17
Yale	13	9	4	0	.692	70	16	15	9	6	0	75	26

1922–23 Triangular Hockey League standings
	Conference								Overall					
	GP	W	L	T	PTS	SW	GF	GA	GP	W	L	T	GF	GA
Harvard *	6	4	2	0	.667	2	9	10	12	8	4	0	34	19
Yale	6	3	3	0	.500	1	13	10	15	9	6	0	75	26
Princeton	6	2	4	0	.333	0	9	11	18	12	5	1	93	30
* indicates conference champion

== Schedule and results ==
Date	Opponent	Site	Result	Record
Regular season
December 13	vs. Boston University*	Boston Arena • Boston, Massachusetts	W 2–0	1–0–0
January 3	Toronto*	Boston Arena • Boston, Massachusetts	L 5–7 ^{2OT}	1–1–0
January 13	Princeton	Boston Arena • Boston, Massachusetts	L 1–3	1–2–0 (0–1–0)
January 20	at Yale	New Haven Arena • New Haven, Connecticut (Rivalry)	W 3–2 ^{3OT}	2–2–0 (1–1–0)
January 26	vs. MIT*	Boston Arena • Boston, Massachusetts	W 10–0	3–2–0
February 14	Queen's*	Boston Arena • Boston, Massachusetts	W 2–1	4–2–0
February 17	Cornell*	Boston Arena • Boston, Massachusetts	W 6–0	5–2–0
February 21	Dartmouth*	Boston Arena • Boston, Massachusetts	L 0–1	5–3–0
February 24	at Princeton	Hobey Baker Memorial Rink • Princeton, New Jersey	W 2–1	6–3–0 (2–1–0)
February 28	Princeton	Boston Arena • Boston, Massachusetts	W 1–0	7–3–0 (3–1–0)
March 3	Yale	Boston Arena • Boston, Massachusetts (Rivalry)	L 0–3	7–4–0 (3–2–0)
March 7	at Yale	New Haven Arena • New Haven, Connecticut (Rivalry)	W 2–1 ^{3OT}	8–4–0 (4–2–0)
*Non-conference game.
