= 1922–23 Colby Mules men's ice hockey season =

Men's ice hockey season in Maine

- Conference: Independent
- Home ice: South End Arena

Record
- Overall: 2–4–0
- Home: 1–2–0
- Road: 1–2–0

Coaches and captains
- Head coach: James Marsh
- Captain: John Berry

The 1922–23 Colby Mules men's ice hockey season was the 2nd season of play for the program. The Mules represented Colby College and were coached by James Marsh in his 1st season.

== Season ==
Though not yet a minor sport, Colby's second season of varsity play began with Professor James Marsh assuming the coaching responsibilities. Unfortunately, the players were more familiar with the game than their bench boss so the team was left mostly to their own devices. Not that it mattered much since the team didn't have any available ice during the first month of the season on account of the weather. The team had received a small stipend from the school for operating costs but it was barely enough to cover the expense of setting up a temporary rink. The team was forced to foot the bill for equipment themselves but persevered through their difficulties.

When the first game arrived, the team had been on the ice for just two practices and the results showed. Bates was able to take the game relatively easily. A week later the team played its first home game on the South End Arena and lost in a very close game to Bowdoin. With some experience under their belts, the team looked far better in the second game, despite the poor ice condition. McGowan and Huhn scored for the Mules on passed from Radcliffe but they were unable to overcome a pair of 2-goal leads from the Polar Bears.

The team got a few weeks off afterwards and didn't play again until the exam break. The reprieve allowed the team to recollect itself and get some practice time in which mightily improved their chances. They were also aided by the appearance of Grenville Vale, who had captained the team last season. Millett gave up his spot on the starting lineup while Huhn dropped back to defense. Vale was one of four players to score in the game and help push Colby to its first win on the season. The win kept the team's hopes for a championship alive but they would need a repeat performance when they travelled to Orono for the rematch a week later. Unfortunately, Maine got its revenge at home and Colby's title chances were next to nothing. The team played a fast game against the Black Bears but they were hampered by too few penalties on what they believed were infractions by Maine.

Colby got a 12-day break afterwards and returned for the final week of the season with a rematch against the Polar Bears. The game started well in Bowdoin's favor with the puck staying in Colby's end for almost the entire first period. Finding itself down by a pair at the start of the second, Vale led a charge with a hat-trick in the middle frame that ended with the Mules scoring the final six goals for a stunning victory. The final game came a week later with a home stand against Bates. While Colby couldn't win the title, they could pull even and spoil the Garnet's pursuit of the state championship at the same time. However, Bates was unbothered by the Mules and swatted the Blues aside with relative ease. Vale got the only goal for Colby in an otherwise terrible effort that ended their season on a low note.

Athletic Director C. Harry Edwards served as team manager.

== Roster ==
No.	Nat.	Player	Class	Pos	Height	Weight	DoB	Hometown	Previous team
	(United States)	John L. Berry (C)	Junior	G				Jeffersonville, Vermont
	(United States)	Samuel P. Huhn Jr.	Sophomore	D/LW				Philadelphia, Pennsylvania
	(United States)	Louis R. McBay	Sophomore	D				New Bedford, Massachusetts
	(United States)	John A. McGowan Jr.	Freshman	C/LW			1902-04-11	Cambridge, Massachusetts
	(United States)	E. Willis Millett	Sophomore	D/LW			1901-07-28	Whitman, Massachusetts
	(United States)	Richard J. Pike	Junior	RW				Winthrop, Massachusetts
	(United States)	Harland R. Ratcliffe	Senior	RW			1901-01-09	Melrose Highlands, Massachusetts
	(United States)	Grenville B. E. Vale	Junior	C				Glen Cove, New York
	(United States)	Ralph C. Young	Sophomore	G				Overbrook, Pennsylvania

== Standings ==
1922–23 Eastern Collegiate ice hockey standings
	Intercollegiate							Overall					
	GP	W	L	T	Pct.	GF	GA	GP	W	L	T	GF	GA
Amherst	8	4	3	1	.563	15	24	8	4	3	1	15	24
Army	11	5	6	0	.455	26	35	14	7	7	0	36	39
Bates	9	6	3	0	.667	34	25	12	8	4	0	56	32
Boston College	5	5	0	0	1.000	30	6	14	12	1	1	53	18
Boston University	7	2	5	0	.286	21	22	8	2	6	0	22	26
Bowdoin	6	3	3	0	.500	18	28	9	5	4	0	37	33
Clarkson	3	1	1	1	.500	3	14	6	2	3	1	18	28
Colby	6	2	4	0	.333	15	21	6	2	4	0	15	21
Columbia	9	0	9	0	.000	14	35	9	0	9	0	14	35
Cornell	6	1	3	2	.333	6	16	6	1	3	2	6	16
Dartmouth	12	10	2	0	.833	49	20	15	13	2	0	67	26
Hamilton	7	2	5	0	.286	20	34	10	4	6	0	37	53
Harvard	10	7	3	0	.700	27	11	12	8	4	0	34	19
Maine	6	2	4	0	.333	16	23	6	2	4	0	16	23
Massachusetts Agricultural	9	3	4	2	.444	13	24	9	3	4	2	13	24
Middlebury	3	0	3	0	.000	1	6	3	0	3	0	1	6
MIT	8	3	5	0	.375	16	52	8	3	5	0	16	52
Pennsylvania	6	1	4	1	.250	8	36	7	2	4	1	11	38
Princeton	15	11	4	0	.733	84	21	18	12	5	1	93	30
Rensselaer	5	1	4	0	.200	6	23	5	1	4	0	6	23
Saint Michael's	3	1	2	0	.333	4	5	–	–	–	–	–	–
Union	0	0	0	0	–	0	0	3	2	1	0	–	–
Williams	9	5	3	1	.611	33	17	10	6	3	1	40	17
Yale	13	9	4	0	.692	70	16	15	9	6	0	75	26

== Schedule and results ==
Date	Opponent	Site	Result	Record
Regular Season
January 12	at Bates*	Lake Andrews Rink • Lewiston, Maine	L 0–5	0–1–0
January 19	Bowdoin*	South End Arena • Waterville, Maine	L 2–3	0–2–0
February 3	Maine*	South End Arena • Waterville, Maine	W 4–2	1–2–0
February 9	at Maine*	Alumni Field Rink • Orono, Maine	L 2–3	1–3–0
February 21	at Bowdoin*	Delta Rink • Brunswick, Maine	W 6–2	2–3–0
February 27	Bates*	South End Arena • Waterville, Maine	L 1–6	2–4–0
*Non-conference game.

Note: Colby and Bates records disagree on the date of the second game with Bates reporting that the game took place on March 1.

== Scoring statistics ==
Name	Position	Games	Goals
Gren Vale	C	4	7
Sam Huhn	D/LW	6	3
John McGowan	C/LW	5	2
Harry Radcliffe	RW	6	2
Bill Millett	D/LW	4	1
Richard Pike	RW	2	0
Ralph Young	G	4	0
John Berry	G	6	0
Louis McBay	D	6	0
Total			15
