= 1922–23 Clarkson Golden Knights men's ice hockey season =

Intercollegiate hockey season

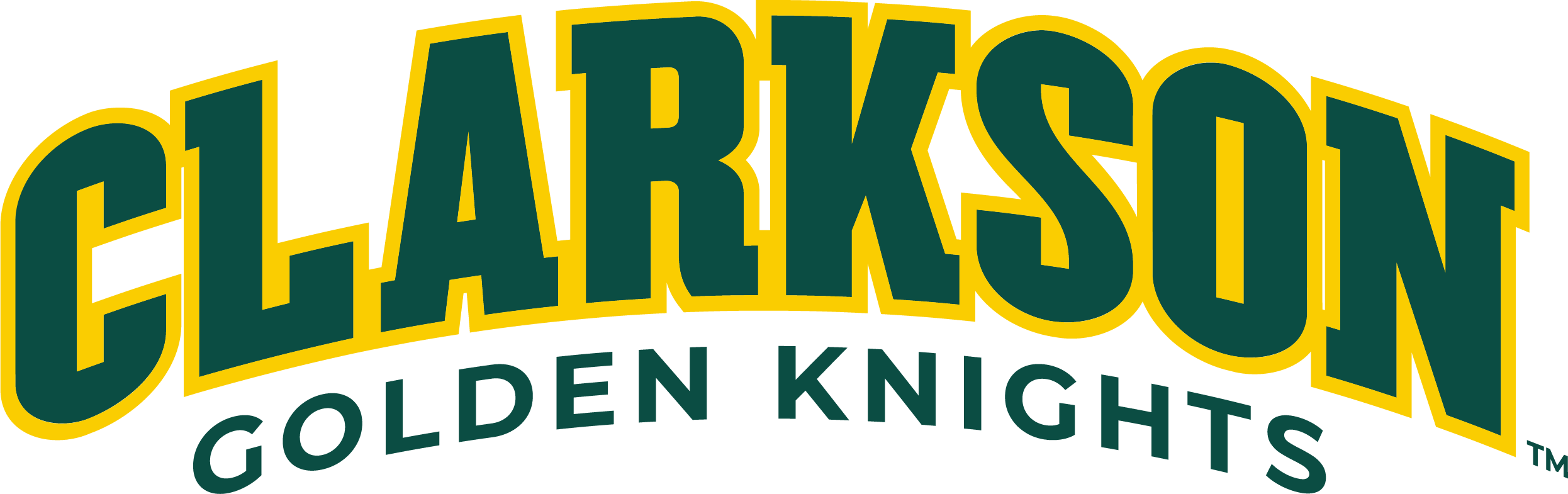
- Home ice: Ives Park

Record
- Overall: 3–2–1
- Home: 1–1–0
- Road: 2–1–1

Coaches and captains
- Captain: Bill Johnson

The 1922–23 Clarkson Golden Knights men's ice hockey season was the 3rd season of play for the program. The team was led by senior captain Bill Johnson and played its home games at Ives Park in Potsdam, New York.

== Season ==
The third season for the program began well, with Clarkson winning their first match against an amateur team from Ogdensburg. A week later they renewed their now-annual rivalry with Alexandria Bay, falling 3–6. The team then met Cornell for the first time and scratched out a 0–0 draw. It was the first intercollegiate game for Tech that didn't end in a lopsided defeat, so the program was at least improving in that regard. A rematch with Alexandria Bay at the end of the month served as the team's first home game. While the score was closer, the result was the same and Clarkson entered February with a losing record.

Of the team's final six games, four were eventually cancelled. While the Knights were able to finish the year on a high note, Hamilton handed Clarkson another embarrassing loss thanks to their indoor arena.

== Roster ==
No.	Nat.	Player	Class	Pos	Height	Weight	DoB	Hometown	Previous team
	(United States)	Cyril Fenn	Junior	F				New York, New York
		William Franse		G
		Franklin Hart		D
		Bill Johnson (C)	Senior	F/D
	(United States)	Samuel LaFontaine	Sophomore	F				Champlain, New York
	(United States)	Joseph Mercer	Sophomore					Malone, New York
		Russel Sanford	Junior	D
		Henry Wilson		F

== Standings ==
1922–23 Eastern Collegiate ice hockey standings
	Intercollegiate							Overall					
	GP	W	L	T	Pct.	GF	GA	GP	W	L	T	GF	GA
Amherst	8	4	3	1	.563	15	24	8	4	3	1	15	24
Army	11	5	6	0	.455	26	35	14	7	7	0	36	39
Bates	9	6	3	0	.667	34	25	12	8	4	0	56	32
Boston College	5	5	0	0	1.000	30	6	14	12	1	1	53	18
Boston University	7	2	5	0	.286	21	22	8	2	6	0	22	26
Bowdoin	6	3	3	0	.500	18	28	9	5	4	0	37	33
Clarkson	3	1	1	1	.500	3	14	6	2	3	1	18	28
Colby	6	2	4	0	.333	15	21	6	2	4	0	15	21
Columbia	9	0	9	0	.000	14	35	9	0	9	0	14	35
Cornell	6	1	3	2	.333	6	16	6	1	3	2	6	16
Dartmouth	12	10	2	0	.833	49	20	15	13	2	0	67	26
Hamilton	7	2	5	0	.286	20	34	10	4	6	0	37	53
Harvard	10	7	3	0	.700	27	11	12	8	4	0	34	19
Maine	6	2	4	0	.333	16	23	6	2	4	0	16	23
Massachusetts Agricultural	9	3	4	2	.444	13	24	9	3	4	2	13	24
Middlebury	3	0	3	0	.000	1	6	3	0	3	0	1	6
MIT	8	3	5	0	.375	16	52	8	3	5	0	16	52
Pennsylvania	6	1	4	1	.250	8	36	7	2	4	1	11	38
Princeton	15	11	4	0	.733	84	21	18	12	5	1	93	30
Rensselaer	5	1	4	0	.200	6	23	5	1	4	0	6	23
Saint Michael's	3	1	2	0	.333	4	5	–	–	–	–	–	–
Union	0	0	0	0	–	0	0	3	2	1	0	–	–
Williams	9	5	3	1	.611	33	17	10	6	3	1	40	17
Yale	13	9	4	0	.692	70	16	15	9	6	0	75	26

== Schedule and results ==
Date	Opponent	Site	Result	Record
Regular season
January 6	at Ogdensburg*	Ogdensburg, New York	W 7–2	1–0–0
January 13	at Alexandria Bay*	Alexandria Bay, New York	L 3–6	1–1–0
January 20	at Cornell*	Beebe Lake • Ithaca, New York	T 0–0 ^{OT}	1–1–1
January 27	vs. Alexandria Bay*	Ives Park • Potsdam, New York	L 5–6	1–2–1
February 2	at Hamilton*	Russell Sage Rink • Clinton, New York	L 0–12	1–3–1
February 10	vs. Saint Michael's*	Ives Park • Potsdam, New York	W 3–2	2–3–1
*Non-conference game.
