= John J. O'Hare =

American athlete (1897–1981)

Biographical details
- Born: July 6, 1897
- Died: November 20, 1981 (aged 84); Framingham, Massachusetts, U.S.

Playing career

Football
- 1919–1921: Boston University

Coaching career (HC unless noted)

Men's ice hockey
- 1922–1924: Boston University

Football
- 1922–1923: Boston University (Asst.)

Head coaching record
- Overall: 3-13

John James "Brick" O'Hare (July 6, 1897 – November 20, 1981) was an American athlete, coach, and lawyer who played football at Boston University and was head coach of the Boston University Terriers men's ice hockey team from 1922 to 1924.

== Early life ==
O'Hare was the son of John J. O'Hare, superintendent of the color department at The Boston Post for 30 years, and his wife, Katherine Whellen O'Hare. His uncle, J. Frank O'Hare, was a trustee of the Boston Elevated Railway. In 1913, O'Hare and his uncle Harry O'Hare saved a man and woman from drowning in Boston Harbor.

== Athletics ==
O'Hare attended The English High School, where he lettered in football, baseball, hockey, and track. While serving as manager of the school's hockey team, he rescued a player who had fallen through the ice on Hammond Pond. He was elected captain of English's 1916–17 hockey team, but resigned due to objections from his parents.

O'Hare served in the United States Navy during World War I and was a played cover point for the First Naval District hockey team. He played end and quarterback for the Boston University Terriers football team and was captain of the 1921 squad. He was also a member of the BU track and baseball teams. While attending the Boston University School of Law, O'Hare and athletic director George V. Brown convinced president Daniel L. Marsh to start the school's hockey program. O'Hare served as the team's head coach and compiled a 3–13 record over two seasons. He was also an assistant football coach.

O'Hare was inducted into the Boston University Athletic Hall of Fame in 1959.

== Legal career ==
O'Hare graduated from the Boston University School of Law in 1924 and was admitted to the bar that same year. He worked as a trial attorney for the Boston Elevated Railway and later, the MBTA. He was also a trustee of the Lotta Crabtree estate.

== Personal life ==
On September 12, 1925, O'Hare married BU Law classmate, Grace Minton. They had three daughters. He died on November 20, 1981 at a nursing home in Framingham, Massachusetts, after a long illness.
