= Mal Morrell =

American football coach and athletic director (1895–1968)

Biographical details
- Born: January 28, 1895; Boston, Massachusetts, U.S.
- Died: October 18, 1968 (aged 73); Brunswick, Maine, U.S.

Coaching career (HC unless noted)
- 1924: Cony HS (ME)
- 1925–1926: Bowdoin (assistant)
- 1927–1929: Bowdoin

Administrative career (AD unless noted)
- 1925–1927: Bowdoin (assistant)
- 1927–1967: Bowdoin

Head coaching record
- Overall: 6–15–2 (college)

Malcolm Elmer Morrell (January 28, 1895 – October 18, 1968) was an American football coach and administrator who was the athletic director at Bowdoin College from 1927 to 1967.

== Early life ==
Morrell was born in Hyde Park, Boston. His father, Harry Morrell, was a publisher who served as president of Lothrop, Lee, & Shepard. Morrell attended Wayland High School and Bowdoin College. At Bowdoin, he was a standout football and baseball player and was captain of the 1923 Bowdoin football team. He played alongside his brother, Al, who was an All-Maine halfback.

== Career ==
Morrell graduated from Bowdoin in 1924 and became the head football coach at Cony High School in Augusta, Maine that fall. He returned to Bowdoin in 1925 as an assistant to head football coach and athletic director John M. Cates. Following Cates' departure in 1927, Morrell was promoted to director of athletics, graduate manager of athletics, and head football coach. He stepped down as football coach after the 1929 season, but stayed on as athletic director. His career coaching record is 6–15–2. Morrell retired as athletic director at the end of the 1966–67 academic year. He died on October 18, 1968, in Brunswick, Maine. In 1969, Bowdoin's gymnasium was renamed the Malcolm E. Morrell Gymnasium in his honor.
