= Stuart Rink =

Military ice rink in West Point, New York

- Interactive map of Stuart Rink
- Location: West Point, New York 10996
- Coordinates: 41°23′35″N 73°57′25″W
- Owner: United States Military Academy
- Operator: United States Military Academy

Construction
- Opened: 1915 (110–111 years ago)
- Closed: 1930 (95–96 years ago)

Tenant
- Army ice hockey 1915–1930

The Stuart Rink was a temporary, outdoor ice rink that was built upon the parade ground on the campus of the United States Military Academy in West Point, New York. The rink served as the home for the Army ice hockey program for 15 years and was replaced by a permanent structure, the Smith Rink.

== History ==
Army began playing ice hockey in 1903–04 and initially used the Lusk Reservoir as their home venue. As the sport became more popular at West Point, the student body began to campaign for a greater investment in the program. Chief among the team's needs was stable and consistent ice. In 1914, the athletic department decided to allow a temporary rink to be constructed on the parade ground, behind the gymnasium. The rink was named in honor of Colonel Stuart, the man responsible for devising the scheme of using compacted ice as a bank and progressively filling up the resulting basin with water so the ice surface could be made.

While the purpose-built rink did help the team, it was still subject to local weather conditions. Still learning how to maintain the rink, Army was forced back onto the reservoir after a warm spell in January of 1916. After that small regression, Army rebuilt their rink the following year and was able to use it thereafter. In 1919, cold weather came late in the year and Lusk used instead while in 1928 the temperatures remained too warm for a full-sized rink to be made and the facility at Bear Mountain was used instead. In most seasons, warm air, sunshine and rain forced Army to cancel a few games but the team did receive better ice than that had on Lusk.

In 1930, after Army posted its first winning season in 9 years, The Academy decided that the program deserved to have a permanent home and began construction of the Smith Rink which was completed before the start of the following season.
