= Saint Michael's Purple Knights =

Saint Michael's College athletic teams

- University: Saint Michael's College
- Conference: Northeast-10 (primary); EISA (skiing); NEWHA (women's ice hockey)
- NCAA: Division II
- Athletic director: Matt Akins
- Location: Colchester, Vermont
- Varsity teams: 22 (10 men's, 11 women's, 1 co-ed)
- Basketball arena: Vincent C. Ross Sports Center
- Ice hockey arena: C. Douglas Cairns Recreation Arena
- Baseball stadium: George "Doc" Jacobs Field
- Softball stadium: George "Doc" Jacobs Field
- Soccer stadium: Christopher M. Duffy Artificial Turf Field
- Aquatics center: Vincent C. Ross Sports Center
- Lacrosse stadium: Christopher M. Duffy Artificial Turf Field
- Tennis venue: SMC Tennis Courts (outdoor), Tarrant Recreation Center (indoor)
- Mascot: Mike The Knight
- Nickname: Purple Knights
- Colors: Purple and gold
- Website: smcathletics.com

The Saint Michael's Purple Knights are the athletic teams that represent Saint Michael's College, located in Colchester, Vermont, in NCAA Division II intercollegiate sports.

The Purple Knights compete as members of the Northeast-10 Conference for most sports. Three teams compete as de facto Division I members. In skiing, a coeducational sport with a single NCAA team championship for all three divisions, the coed teams are part of the Eastern Intercollegiate Ski Association. In women's ice hockey, which has a combined Division I/II national championship, the Purple Knights are a member of the New England Women's Hockey Alliance.

== Varsity teams ==
Men's sports	Women's sports
Baseball	Basketball
Basketball	Cross country
Cross country	Field hockey
Golf	Ice hockey
Ice hockey	Lacrosse
Lacrosse	Soccer
Soccer	Softball
Swimming and diving	Swimming and diving
Tennis	Tennis
Track and field	Track and field
	Volleyball
Co-ed sports
Skiing (Note: The NCAA considers skiing to be a single sport that encompasses both Alpine and Nordic disciplines. While schools have separate men's and women's squads, with all races involving members of a single sex, the NCAA awards a single team championship.)

== Notable alumni ==
- Travis Warech (attended; born 1991), basketball player for Hapoel Be'er Sheva of the Israeli Premier League
