= Ernest Christensen =

Biographical details
- Born: November 10, 1897; Gloucester, Massachusetts, USA
- Died: May 7, 1977 (aged 79)
- Education: New Hampshire College

Playing career
- 1919–1921: New Hampshire
- Positions: Right Tackle, Center

Coaching career (HC unless noted)

Baseball
- 1924–1932: New Hampshire (freshmen)

Football
- 1924–1937: New Hampshire (asst.)

Ice Hockey
- 1925–1936: New Hampshire
- 1937–1938: New Hampshire

Lacrosse
- 1932–1936: New Hampshire
- 1938: New Hampshire

Head coaching record
- Overall: 55–57–8 (.492) [ice hockey] 30–15 (.667) [lacrosse]

Accomplishments and honors

Records
- Military career
- Allegiance: United States
- Branch: United States Army
- Service years: 1917-1918
- Rank: First sergeant

Ernest Waldemar "Chris" Christensen was an American athlete and coach and businessman. He both attended and coached at the University of New Hampshire for nearly two decades before running an insurance business for 24 years. He was inducted into the New Hampshire Wildcats Athletic Hall of Fame in 1982.

== Career ==
Christensen began attending New Hampshire College in the fall of 1916 after graduating from Gloucester High School. He was class vice president in his freshman year and pursuing a degree in agriculture. However, after just a year of studies he withdrew from college to join the Army after the United States had entered World War I. He served in the bicycle infantry with distinction, rising up to the rank of first sergeant by war's end. Afterwards, he resumed his studies at NHC, this time as a member of the Engineering department. Upon his return, Christensen joined the football team and eventually became a starter on the offensive line.

After graduating in 1922, Christensen spent two years away before returning to the college as an instructor of physical education. He was an assistant coach with the football team and the freshman baseball coach for several years. During that time he also accepted the role of head coach of the nascent ice hockey team in 1925. In 1932, when the school began sponsoring Lacrosse, Christensen became the program's first head coach. He was forced to take a leave of absence from his duties in 1937 while recovering from an attack of sinusitis.

In 1938, then an assistant professor, Christensen resigned from the university to pursue a career in business. He set up an insurance practice in Dover and worked there until his retirement in 1962. During that time, he served as a trustee for the university for 21 years, receiving an honorary doctorate in 1962. In 1970, one of the new residence halls was dedicated in his honor. Christensen Hall is a 10-story on-campus residence that remains in use by the school (as of 2024).

After his death in 1977, Christensen was inducted into the university athletic hall of fame.

== Head coaching record ==
=== Ice Hockey ===
Record table
Season	Team	Overall	Conference	Standing	Postseason
New Hampshire Bulls Independent (1925–1926)
1925–26	New Hampshire	1–6–0			
New Hampshire Wildcats Independent (1926–1936)
1926–27	New Hampshire	6–0–0			
1927–28	New Hampshire	7–1–1			
1928–29	New Hampshire	6–4–1			
1929–30	New Hampshire	3–8–2			
1930–31	New Hampshire	7–5–0			
1931–32	New Hampshire	0–8–0			
1932–33	New Hampshire	1–6–0			
1933–34	New Hampshire	5–6–1			
1934–35	New Hampshire	6–4–2			
1935–36	New Hampshire	7–6–0			
New Hampshire Wildcats Independent (1937–1938)
1937–38	New Hampshire	6–3–1			
New Hampshire:		55–57–8			
Total:		55–57–8			
National champion Postseason invitational champion Conference regular season champion Conference regular season and conference tournament champion Division regular season champion Division regular season and conference tournament champion Conference tournament champion

=== Lacrosse ===
Record table
Season	Team	Overall	Conference	Standing	Postseason
New Hampshire Wildcats Independent (1932–1936)
1932	New Hampshire	2–5			
1933	New Hampshire	5–3			
1934	New Hampshire	7–2			
1935	New Hampshire	5–2			
1936	New Hampshire	5–2			
New Hampshire Wildcats Independent (1938–1938)
1938	New Hampshire	6–1			
New Hampshire:		30–15			
Total:		30–15			
National champion Postseason invitational champion Conference regular season champion Conference regular season and conference tournament champion Division regular season champion Division regular season and conference tournament champion Conference tournament champion
