= 1925–26 Princeton Tigers men's ice hockey season =

College ice hockey season

- Conference: 3rd THL
- Home ice: Hobey Baker Memorial Rink

Record
- Overall: 7–9–0
- Conference: 2–2–0
- Home: 3–4–0
- Road: 4–2–0
- Neutral: 0–3–0

Coaches and captains
- Head coach: Beattie Ramsay
- Captain: Burt Wilkinson

The 1925–26 Princeton Tigers men's ice hockey season was the 26th season of play for the program. The Tigers represented Princeton University and were coached Beattie Ramsay in his 2nd season.

== Season ==
=== Clean slate ===
After playing ice hockey since the end of the 19th century, Princeton finally upgraded the men's program to major status in 1925. Aside from the increase in attention and prestige that came with the new designation, Princeton was now financially fully committed to support the team.

With this in mind, 145 men showed up for the first practice of the season at the beginning of December (both freshman and varsity). However, that huge number included only three returning lettermen and would mean that the starting lineup would have mostly new faces. Hindering their efforts, the Hobey Baker Rink was not ready in time for the start of the year. However, the issues were swiftly resolved and the team got to work by dividing into several groups. The team only had a few weeks to practice before their first game and ended up relying heaving on players who had made previous appearances. Aside from Colebrook and team captain Burt Wilkinson, Davis had returned to college after a year off and rejoined the ice hockey team. Casey, Hallock, Martin, Means and Pitman had all worn the orange and black but were now in the running to earn their letters.

The St. Nicholas Hockey Club provided an early-season glimpse at the team and would help coach Ramsay determine who and what skills still needed work. Hallock, starting at defense for the first time, was the standout star for the Tigers in the game. Not only did he help turn aside several rushes from the visitors but he also scored the game's first goal. Davis netted the second marker for Princeton while Colebrook kept his team in the lead for most of the match with several remarkable saves. However, the amateur club, which was made up primarily of former college stars, refused to go away and scored three times in the third period to steal the match. Afterwards, the team had over two full weeks to both practice and disband for the winter break before returning for a jam-packed trip through New York and Canada.

=== Holiday trip ===
Shortly after Christmas, the team played two games at the brand new Madison Square Garden against Canadian colleges. As had happened last season, coach Ramsay wanted to harden the squad through several difficult matches early in the year. Unfortunately, the strong play the Tigers had shown in their first game never materialized. Against both the Royal Military College and Montreal, Princeton had a distinct lack of teamwork that hamstrung their offense. After losing both games by a 2-goal margin, the team set off to Buffalo and were finally able to earn their first win against the Nichols Hockey Club. Princeton then headed north into Canada, stopping for a few practices before meeting the Quebec Sons of Ireland just after New Year's. The experienced amateur team got the better of the Tigers but the team was beginning to show an improved level of play.

=== Setback ===
After returning home, the Tigers had a short pause before heading back to Manhattan to face Queen's. Despite hopes that Princeton could exhibit a better brand of hockey after their arduous trip, the team's offense failed utterly and ended their non-collegiate schedule with a poor mark of 1–5. The club then had only a few days to prepare themselves for their first match with Harvard but they were ready to go once the puck dropped. Princeton jumped out to a huge lead on the Crimson, scoring three times in the first period and routinely held Harvard in their own end. By this point, Wilkinson had dropped back to join Hallock on defense and allowed Davis, Harding and Pitman to form a potent starting line. Each of the three forward recorded goals to give the Tigers a 2-goal lead after 20 minutes. However, as they were want to, Harvard used a large selection of alternates to keep fresh legs in the game. The play allowed the visiting team to turn the tide beginning at the start of the second and take over the remainder of the match. Colebrook was a dervish in the goal, moving as fast as he could to halt the attack. He made numerous brilliant stops, ending the match with 49 saves, but Princeton could not hold Harvard back. The Crimson were able to score once each period and end regulation with the score tied at 3-all. In the first of two 5-minute overtimes, Harvard got its first lead of the match and then continued to play its oppressive style to forestall any Princeton comeback.

=== Breakthrough ===
After such a disappointing loss, Princeton had a week to refocus and gear up for the first game with Yale. The Elis had made arrangements to use Madison Square Garden as their home rink this season since the New Haven Arena was still being rebuilt. In Princeton's fourth and final appearance of the year, they were greeted by 15,000 fans and gave the spectators a sight to behold. Wilkinson opened the scoring and the early foray seemed to spark a high-level performance from the rest of the team. Davis added a goal a few minutes later while several big saves enabled the team to carry a 2-goal lead into the second period. Princeton continued to carry the play, hemming Yale in the own end for much of the middle frame. Wilkinson scored to increase the team's lead further but then Tigers then got into some penalty trouble. With two men in the box, Yale was able to go on the offensive. Colebrook stopped every shot on the double disadvantage and, once it was over, Davis flashed down the rink and raised the score to 4–0. The third saw the Elis abandon any pretense at defense and focus solely on trying to score. The Tiger defense began to lose ground and were eventually pressed back into their own end in the latter stages of the game. Yale scored twice in the waning minutes but it was not enough to change the outcome.

After the mildly surprising victory, Princeton got their chance at revenge against St. Nicholas. After a scoreless first period, the two teams exchanged a barrage of goals with Hallock, Pitman, Davis and Wilkinson all contributing to a 4–3 lead at the start of the third. The offensive fireworks continued in the final period, however, St. Nicks' was the only one finding the back of the net. 5 goals got past Colebrook as the team's defense completely broke down. Three days later, the team got their chance for redemption against the New York Athletic Club. The Tigers were led from the back as Wilkinson and Hallock routinely skated the puck up the ice and fired shots on goal. The two defensemen both scored in regulation and were joined by Pitman to equal the total of the amateur club and force the match into overtime. The team was nearly met with disaster when Colebrook was caught out of position but two players jumped in front of the puck to stop the New Yorkers from scoring. As time was expiring in the second overtime, Wilkinson made one final rush that ended in a goal and a win for the Tigers.

=== Offensive struggles ===
Princeton had a week to prepare themselves for the rematch with Harvard. After their first two conference games, the Tigers thought well of their chances at a conference title but to do so they would have to defeated the Crimson. The defense, combining Wilkinson, Hallock and Colebrook, played a tremendous game with the blue liners combining for three goals in the match. However, the two forward lines were completely outplayed by the Bostonians and led to complete disaster for Princeton. After opening up a 2-goal lead, Princeton was pressed into their own zone for most of the game and were forced to defend against one of the most well-disciplined units in college hockey. Princeton's lead didn't even last until the end of the first and their only chance was for Colebrook to steal them the game. However, two more goals followed and put the Tigers behind the 8-ball. Hallock's second of the game came in the final minutes of the match and led to a spirited, if brief, resurgence but the team was handed a loss and their chances at a title fell by the wayside.

To try and get some life back into the forward, Wilkinson was moved back up to wing while DeLamater was promoted to starting center. Richman joined Hallock on defense and coach Ramsay hoped that the team would have a better performance against Dartmouth. However, the Tigers ended up running head-first into a buzz-saw and were trounced by the Indians 2–11. In what was described as the best performance ever seen from a collegiate team, Dartmouth began slow, with just a single goal in the first. Colebrook made several spectacular saves to keep the score close and limited the Greens to two markers in the second. Davis found the back of the net to make the score a credible 1–3 after 40 minutes. However, with live legs and a faster lineup, Dartmouth fired 8 goals into the net in the final period to trample the Tigers. Princeton was completely at the Indians' mercy and looked like they were playing a professional team rather than a fellow college.

=== Defensive success ===
After the debacle with Dartmouth, the team had two weeks to practice before the next game. They set out on a swing through upstate New York and met Cornell first. Wilkinson was dropped back to defense with Pitman resuming his place on the wing. With the offense rather anemic, the Tigers would have to ride their defensive prowess to victory. That plan succeeded in Ithaca, New York, thanks to just enough offense from Harding and DeLamater. After a second close victory, this time over Hamilton, the team returned home.

The rematch with Yale saw both teams struggle to score. Despite several rushes up and down the ice, neither goaltender yielded much in the game. The Bulldogs early and carried their narrow advantage late into the third. With just a few minutes left in the match, Hallock caged a goal and forced overtime. He scored his second of the game with just 10-second left in the first extra period and then helped to hold off the comeback attempt in the second overtime. The win gave Princeton its first series win in THL play since 1921. A few days later, the team ended its season by facing down Williams. The two teams were decidedly subdued and provided few offensive bursts for the crowd. Both sides occasionally made forays into the attacking zone but more often than not they were content with running into one another, which the home crowd seemed to appreciate. For the second consecutive game, Hallock scored the winning goal and ended Princeton's season with a 4-game winning streak.

Robert I. Hobson served as team manager with Edward E. Colladay as his assistant.

== Roster ==
No.	Nat.	Player	Class	Pos	Height	Weight	DoB	Hometown	Previous team
	(United States)	Robert H. Casey	Junior	RW			1904-05-14	Utica, New York
	(United States)	Martin A. Charles	Senior	D				San Francisco, California
	(United States)	Mulfred A. Colebrook	Senior	G				Rochester, New York
	(United States)	Austin D. S. Davis	Junior	C/RW			1903-08-28	Albany, New York
	(United States)	Cornelius H. DeLamater Jr.	Junior	C/LW			1903-09-03	Manhattan, New York
	(United States)	John W. Grange	Junior	LW			1904-08-31	Philadelphia, Pennsylvania
	(United States)	Gerard Hallock III	Senior	D			1905-06-14	Pottstown, Pennsylvania
	(United States)	Henry K. Harding	Sophomore	C			1904-12-20	Dedham, Massachusetts
	(United States)	E. Ralph Martin	Senior	C			1904-05-12	Brooklyn, New York
	(United States)	Richard H. Means	Senior	LW			1904-04-19	Buffalo, New York
	(United States)	John R. Pitman Jr.	Junior	C/LW				Orange, New Jersey
	(United States)	Grey D. Richman	Sophomore	D/LW				West Orange, New Jersey
	(United States)	Burton F. Wilkinson (C)	Senior	D/LW			1905-05-11	Buffalo, New York

== Standings ==
1925–26 Eastern Collegiate ice hockey standings
	Intercollegiate							Overall					
	GP	W	L	T	Pct.	GF	GA	GP	W	L	T	GF	GA
Amherst	7	1	4	2	.286	11	28	7	1	4	2	11	28
Army	8	3	5	0	.375	14	23	9	3	6	0	17	30
Bates	9	3	5	1	.389	18	37	9	3	5	1	18	37
Boston College	3	2	1	0	.667	9	5	15	6	8	1	46	54
Boston University	11	7	4	0	.636	28	11	15	7	8	0	31	28
Bowdoin	6	4	2	0	.667	18	13	7	4	3	0	18	18
Clarkson	5	2	3	0	.400	10	13	8	4	4	0	25	25
Colby	5	0	4	1	.100	9	18	6	1	4	1	–	–
Cornell	6	2	4	0	.333	10	21	6	2	4	0	10	21
Dartmouth	–	–	–	–	–	–	–	15	12	3	0	72	34
Hamilton	–	–	–	–	–	–	–	10	7	3	0	–	–
Harvard	9	8	1	0	.889	34	13	11	8	3	0	38	20
Massachusetts Agricultural	8	3	4	1	.438	10	20	8	3	4	1	10	20
Middlebury	8	5	3	0	.625	19	16	8	5	3	0	19	16
MIT	9	3	6	0	.333	16	32	9	3	6	0	16	32
New Hampshire	3	1	2	0	.333	5	7	7	1	6	0	11	29
Norwich	–	–	–	–	–	–	–	2	1	1	0	–	–
Princeton	8	5	3	0	.625	21	25	16	7	9	0	44	61
Rensselaer	–	–	–	–	–	–	–	6	2	4	0	–	–
Saint Michael's	–	–	–	–	–	–	–	–	–	–	–	–	–
St. Lawrence	2	0	2	0	.000	1	4	2	0	2	0	1	4
Syracuse	6	2	2	2	.500	8	7	7	3	2	2	10	7
Union	6	2	3	1	.417	18	24	6	2	3	1	18	24
Vermont	4	1	3	0	.250	18	11	5	2	3	0	20	11
Williams	15	10	4	1	.700	59	23	18	12	5	1	72	28
Yale	10	1	8	1	.150	9	23	14	4	9	1	25	30

1925–26 Triangular Hockey League standings
	Conference								Overall					
	GP	W	L	T	PTS	SW	GF	GA	GP	W	L	T	GF	GA
Harvard *	4	4	0	0	1.000	2	14	6	11	8	3	0	38	20
Princeton	4	2	2	0	.500	1	12	11	16	7	9	0	44	61
Yale	4	0	4	0	.000	0	3	12	14	4	9	1	25	30
* indicates conference champion

== Schedule and results ==
Date	Opponent	Site	Result	Record
Regular Season
December 12	St. Nicholas Hockey Club*	Hobey Baker Memorial Rink • Princeton, New Jersey	L 2–3	0–1–0
December 28	vs. Royal Military College*	Madison Square Garden • Manhattan, New York	L 1–3	0–2–0
December 29	vs. Montreal*	Madison Square Garden • Manhattan, New York	L 3–5	0–3–0
December 31	at Nichols Hockey Club*	Nichols School Rink • Buffalo, New York	W 4–1	1–3–0
January 2	at Quebec Sons of Ireland*	Toronto, Ontario	L 5–9	1–4–0
January 6	vs. Queen's*	Madison Square Garden • Manhattan, New York	L 0–4	1–5–0
January 9	Harvard	Hobey Baker Memorial Rink • Princeton, New Jersey	L 3–4 ^{2OT}	1–6–0 (0–1–0)
January 16	at Yale	Madison Square Garden • Manhattan, New York	W 4–2	2–6–0 (1–1–0)
January 20	St. Nicholas Hockey Club*	Hobey Baker Memorial Rink • Princeton, New Jersey	L 4–8	2–7–0
January 23	New York Athletic Club*	Hobey Baker Memorial Rink • Princeton, New Jersey	W 4–3 ^{2OT}	3–7–0
January 30	at Harvard	Boston Arena • Boston, Massachusetts	L 3–4	3–8–0 (1–2–0)
February 3	Dartmouth*	Hobey Baker Memorial Rink • Princeton, New Jersey	L 2–11	3–9–0
February 17	at Cornell*	Beebe Lake • Ithaca, New York	W 2–1	4–9–0
February 18	at Hamilton*	Russell Sage Rink • Clinton, New York	W 2–0	5–9–0
February 22	Yale	Hobey Baker Memorial Rink • Princeton, New Jersey	W 2–1 ^{2OT}	6–9–0 (2–2–0)
February 27	Williams*	Hobey Baker Memorial Rink • Princeton, New Jersey	W 3–2	7–9–0
*Non-conference game.

Note: a contemporary account refers to the match with the Nichols Hockey Club as a loss but does not report a score and is not corroborated in other records.
