= 1925–26 Boston University Terriers men's ice hockey season =

- Conference: Independent
- Home ice: Boston Arena

Record
- Overall: 7–8–0
- Home: 1–2–0
- Road: 2–4–0
- Neutral: 4–2–0

Coaches and captains
- Head coach: Chippy Gaw
- Captain: Rod Ling

The 1925-26 Boston University Terriers men's ice hockey season was the 6th season of play for the program. The Terriers were coached by Chippy Gaw in his 2nd season.

== Season ==
BU entered the season looking to sustain the level of play from the previous year. In the first game, the Terriers looked like a well-oiled machine with many returning players leading the effort. Don Martin was stellar in goal while Lawless, Scott and Gregoire routinely breaking through the MIT defense. Even the alternates got into the action with Kontoff ending the night's scoring. Coach Gaw then had two weeks to get the team into shape for their match with Harvard. Martin ended up having the best performance of his career, pitching a shutout against the vaunted crimson and giving BU its first ever win against the cross-town rivals.

Just before new year's, Boston University played host to one of Canada's top college teams but the Terriers weren't as ready for Toronto as they had been for Harvard. The Varsity Blues piled 8 goals into the BU cage and didn't surrender a one. After the embarrassing defeat, the team played in a fugue over their next two games. In the rematch with MIT the team slept-walked through the first two periods and only woke up when they found themselves down by a pair in the third. Scott managed to cut into the Engineers lead but there wasn't enough time to mount a proper comeback. The team looked better in their next match but they weren't able to distance themselves from Williams at any point in the match. Ling and Scott combined to give the team a lead in the second but it didn't last and BU went without a goal in the entire second half of the game.

After the failures on offense, coach Gaw changed his lineup by dropping Gregoire back to defense, moving team captain Ling up to left wing and starting Kontoff at right wing. The new-look Terriers responded with a dominant game over Bowdoin including a hat-trick from Gregoire. Martin split the shutout with his understudy, Silverberg. The following day the team took a trip to Buffalo to face the Nichols Club, a semi-pro outfit. After dropping the match they stopped off in Ithaca on their way home for a match with Cornell. Though they won the game, Gregoire netted the only goal of the match and all of the offensive lessons from the Bowdoin match seemed to have been forgotten. The final game before the exam break saw the Terriers make their debut on Broadway when they appeared at the newly opened Madison Square Garden. Their anemic offense didn't serve the Terriers well and the team fell to the St. Nicholas Hockey Club in a lopsided match.

With the offense no longer working, the team shifted its attentions to the defensive side of the puck and looked far better in their game with Boston College. From the start of the match the Terriers hit the Eagles hard and often. With the two playing for a trophy donated by Harvard's legendary coach, Alfred Winsor, the match was close throughout. Gregoire got the opening goal on a lucky bounce when he fired the puck from 3/4 the length of the ice. BC's goaltender was unable to keep sight of the puck and only knew it was coming towards him when it hit near his feet and bounded into the goal. Silverberg, who was starting in goal, played a terrific game by stopping many good chances from the Eagles but he couldn't save everything, and BC tied the game at the end of the second. By the third period both teams were visibly tired from the rough match and a quick shot out of a scramble in front of the net found its way into the BU cage. A few nights later the team travelled to West Point to shutout Army but then lost their first match after returning home.

The Terriers had to wait over two weeks for their next game but were finally able to settle the season series with MIT at the beginning of March. The game was fairly listless through two periods with only a goal from Jack Lawless on the scoresheet. During the second intermission, George V. Brown, the owner of the Boston Arena, decided that the game wasn't worth continuing and he ordered the match called. BU and the crowd then got ready to leave, however, Brown did not have the authority to end the match and referee Frank Synott along with MIT refused to comply. When the puck was dropped for the start of the third, BU was still packing their things in the locker room and MIT scored several goals into an empty cage. Eventually MIT's coach, Bill Stewart, called a halt to play and sent the team manager into the dressing room to convince the Terriers to return to the ice to finish the match. After a shot time, Gaw and the team agreed and the game was resumed at 11:30. In the meantime, Stewart had the scorekeeper erase the goals that had been scored by the Engineers as he did not want to win by default. The final 20 minutes of the match saw a much improved effort from both teams and were a sight for the few remaining fans. One more goal for BU was scored in the final frame and allowed the Terriers to claim supremacy for the year.

For their penultimate game, the Terriers got a rematch with Boston College and Silverberg made sure the Eagles would not get the better of him. With help from Ling and Viano on defense, every shot from BC went for naught and two markers from Lawless were more than enough to carry the day. The win ensured that the two were even not only on the season but also had to share honors for the Winsor trophy with each having scored 7 goals in the matches between themselves and Harvard. The final game for the Terriers came a week later against an amateur club, the Tech Beavers, which resulted in a loss.

== Roster ==
No.	Nat.	Player	Class	Pos	Height	Weight	DoB	Hometown	Previous team
		Thomas Cummings		LW
		David Duane		D
		William Goodale		LW/RW
		Ovila Gregoire	Sophomore	D/W
		Julian Kontoff		C/LW/RW
		John Lawless	Sophomore	LW/RW
		Roderick Ling		D/LW
		MacLean		C
		Donald Martin	Sophomore	G
		Chester Scott		C
		Sydney Silverberg	Freshman	G
		Charles Viano	Sophomore	D
		William Wennerberg		LW

== Standings ==
1925–26 Eastern Collegiate ice hockey standings
	Intercollegiate							Overall					
	GP	W	L	T	Pct.	GF	GA	GP	W	L	T	GF	GA
Amherst	7	1	4	2	.286	11	28	7	1	4	2	11	28
Army	8	3	5	0	.375	14	23	9	3	6	0	17	30
Bates	9	3	5	1	.389	18	37	9	3	5	1	18	37
Boston College	3	2	1	0	.667	9	5	15	6	8	1	46	54
Boston University	11	7	4	0	.636	28	11	15	7	8	0	31	28
Bowdoin	6	4	2	0	.667	18	13	7	4	3	0	18	18
Clarkson	5	2	3	0	.400	10	13	8	4	4	0	25	25
Colby	5	0	4	1	.100	9	18	6	1	4	1	–	–
Cornell	6	2	4	0	.333	10	21	6	2	4	0	10	21
Dartmouth	–	–	–	–	–	–	–	15	12	3	0	72	34
Hamilton	–	–	–	–	–	–	–	10	7	3	0	–	–
Harvard	9	8	1	0	.889	34	13	11	8	3	0	38	20
Massachusetts Agricultural	8	3	4	1	.438	10	20	8	3	4	1	10	20
Middlebury	8	5	3	0	.625	19	16	8	5	3	0	19	16
MIT	9	3	6	0	.333	16	32	9	3	6	0	16	32
New Hampshire	3	1	2	0	.333	5	7	7	1	6	0	11	29
Norwich	–	–	–	–	–	–	–	2	1	1	0	–	–
Princeton	8	5	3	0	.625	21	25	16	7	9	0	44	61
Rensselaer	–	–	–	–	–	–	–	6	2	4	0	–	–
Saint Michael's	–	–	–	–	–	–	–	–	–	–	–	–	–
St. Lawrence	2	0	2	0	.000	1	4	2	0	2	0	1	4
Syracuse	6	2	2	2	.500	8	7	7	3	2	2	10	7
Union	6	2	3	1	.417	18	24	6	2	3	1	18	24
Vermont	4	1	3	0	.250	18	11	5	2	3	0	20	11
Williams	15	10	4	1	.700	59	23	18	12	5	1	72	28
Yale	10	1	8	1	.150	9	23	14	4	9	1	25	30

== Schedule and results ==
Date	Opponent	Site	Result	Record
Regular Season
December 4	vs. MIT*	Boston Arena • Boston, Massachusetts	W 5–1	1–0–0
December 18	vs. Harvard*	Boston Arena • Boston, Massachusetts	W 3–0	2–0–0
December 31	Toronto*	Boston Arena • Boston, Massachusetts	L 0–8	2–1–0
January 13	vs. MIT*	Boston Arena • Boston, Massachusetts	L 1–2	2–2–0
January 16	at Williams*	Weston Field Rink • Williamstown, Massachusetts	L 2–3	2–3–0
January 20	Bowdoin*	Boston Arena • Boston, Massachusetts	W 6–0	3–3–0
January 22	at Nichols Club*	Nichols Rink • Buffalo, New York	L 1–2	3–4–0
January 23	at Cornell*	Beebe Lake • Ithaca, New York	W 1–0	4–4–0
January 27	at St. Nicholas Hockey Club*	Madison Square Garden • Manhattan, New York	L 1–5	4–5–0
February 4	vs. Boston College*	Boston Arena • Boston, Massachusetts	L 1–2	4–6–0
February 6	at Army*	Stuart Rink • West Point, New York	W 3–0	5–6–0
February 11	Dartmouth*	Boston Arena • Boston, Massachusetts	L 1–3	5–7–0
March 1	vs. MIT*	Boston Arena • Boston, Massachusetts	W 2–0	6–7–0
March 4	vs. Boston College*	Boston Arena • Boston, Massachusetts	W 3–0	7–7–0
March 10	at Tech Beavers*	Rhode Island Auditorium • Providence, Rhode Island	L 1–2	7–8–0
*Non-conference game.

== Scoring statistics ==
Name	Position	Games	Goals
Ovila Gregore	D/LW/RW	-	10
Chester Scott	C	-	8
MacLean	C	1	0
Tom Cummings	LW	4	0
David Duane	D	-	0
Donald Martin	G	-	0
Sydney Silverberg	G	-	0
William Wennerberg	LW	-	0
Bill Goodale	LW/RW	-	-
John Lawless	LW/RW	-	-
Rod Ling	D/LW	-	-
Julian Kontoff	C/LW/RW	-	-
Charles Viano	D	-	-
Total			
