= 1925–26 Army Cadets men's ice hockey season =

- Conference: Independent
- Home ice: Stuart Rink

Record
- Overall: 3–6–0
- Home: 3–5–0
- Neutral: 0–1–0

Coaches and captains
- Head coach: Ray Marchand
- Captain: Willet Baird

The 1925–26 Army Cadets men's ice hockey season was the 23rd season of play for the program. The team was coached by Ray Marchand in his 3rd season.

== Season ==
Entering the season with most of the previous team's starters still enrolled, Army had high hopes for the team in 1926 and arranged their schedule accordingly. Several strong team were engaged for a trip to West Point and the Cadets were preparing for a hard test throughout the year. Unfortunately, as luck would have it, the weather was not accommodating. The Cadets were unable to get Stuart Rink up and running in December and were forced to trek south to Bear Mountain and use the artificial rink there. Infrequent practices occurred over a two-week period before the first game, by which time Stuart had become usable. Even with a full series of practices under their belt, Army would have been hard pressed to win their first match. Dartmouth demonstrated that they were one of the best teams from the start of their season and they continued that trend by rolling over the Cadets.

Army got their first win of the season against Bates the following week but it didn't come easy. After surrendering a 2-goal lead to the Bobcats, Scheiffler netted the winning goal with a few minutes left in the game. The next game on Army's schedule was against Boston College, however, BC does not record the game as having taken place. Contemporary news accounts show that the team was worried about the condition of the ice prior to the match but makes no reference to the game afterwards. Its possible that a junior varsity squad was sent in their place, particularly since Army referred to the team as being full of players whose last names began with 'Mc' and 'O' while only one of the Eagles' regular players fell into that category.

The Cadets evened their record a second time with a win over Amherst and then a snowstorm dumped several feet of snow on West Point. Since the snow couldn't be cleared off of the rink in time, Army was forced back to Bear Mountain for their game against Boston University. Snowfall affected the next game as well as the match with Massachusetts Agricultural College was limited to just 2 periods. Army's losing streak ran to 3 games with a loss to Syracuse a few days later but the rink began to become rough afterwards. In the contest against Middlebury, which had been rescheduled from January 20 due to a lack of ice, was severely slowed by bad ice. Only one goal could be scored, early in the game, but fortunately for the Cadets it was from the stick of Heidner. Army ended their season against Williams and were shut down by the Ephs.

The game against Royal Military College was cancelled due to the death of one of the Paladins players.

Charles Sloane served as the team's manager.

== Roster ==
| No. | Nat. | Player | Class | Pos | Height | Weight | DoB | Hometown | Previous team |
|---|---|---|---|---|---|---|---|---|---|
| | (United States) | Willet J. Baird (C) | Senior (RS) | D | | | 1902-01-13 | Cornwall-on-Hudson, New York |
| | (United States) | Maurice F. Daly | Junior | D | | | 1901-07-20 | Hartford, Connecticut |
| | (United States) | Alvin A. Heidner | Senior | C | | | 1904-10-14 | North Dakota |
| | (United States) | Mark K. Lewis Jr. | Junior | G | | | 1902-10-29 | Maple Shade, New Jersey |
| | (United States) | Raymond C. Maude | Senior | LW | | | 1902-07-01 | Framingham, Massachusetts |
| | (United States) | Tito C. Moscatelli | Sophomore | RW | | | 1904-09-04 | Cagli, Italy |
| | (United States) | Frederick F. Scheiffler | Senior | F | | | 1904-04-15 | Alpena, Michigan |

== Standings ==
1925–26 Eastern Collegiate ice hockey standings
| | Intercollegiate | | | | | | | Overall | | | | | |
| | GP | W | L | T | Pct. | GF | GA | GP | W | L | T | GF | GA |
|---|---|---|---|---|---|---|---|---|---|---|---|---|---|
| Amherst | 7 | 1 | 4 | 2 | .286 | 11 | 28 | 7 | 1 | 4 | 2 | 11 | 28 |
| Army | 8 | 3 | 5 | 0 | .375 | 14 | 23 | 9 | 3 | 6 | 0 | 17 | 30 |
| Bates | 9 | 3 | 5 | 1 | .389 | 18 | 37 | 9 | 3 | 5 | 1 | 18 | 37 |
| Boston College | 3 | 2 | 1 | 0 | .667 | 9 | 5 | 15 | 6 | 8 | 1 | 46 | 54 |
| Boston University | 11 | 7 | 4 | 0 | .636 | 28 | 11 | 15 | 7 | 8 | 0 | 31 | 28 |
| Bowdoin | 6 | 4 | 2 | 0 | .667 | 18 | 13 | 7 | 4 | 3 | 0 | 18 | 18 |
| Clarkson | 5 | 2 | 3 | 0 | .400 | 10 | 13 | 8 | 4 | 4 | 0 | 25 | 25 |
| Colby | 5 | 0 | 4 | 1 | .100 | 9 | 18 | 6 | 1 | 4 | 1 | – | – |
| Cornell | 6 | 2 | 4 | 0 | .333 | 10 | 21 | 6 | 2 | 4 | 0 | 10 | 21 |
| Dartmouth | – | – | – | – | – | – | – | 15 | 12 | 3 | 0 | 72 | 34 |
| Hamilton | – | – | – | – | – | – | – | 10 | 7 | 3 | 0 | – | – |
| Harvard | 9 | 8 | 1 | 0 | .889 | 34 | 13 | 11 | 8 | 3 | 0 | 38 | 20 |
| Massachusetts Agricultural | 8 | 3 | 4 | 1 | .438 | 10 | 20 | 8 | 3 | 4 | 1 | 10 | 20 |
| Middlebury | 8 | 5 | 3 | 0 | .625 | 19 | 16 | 8 | 5 | 3 | 0 | 19 | 16 |
| MIT | 9 | 3 | 6 | 0 | .333 | 16 | 32 | 9 | 3 | 6 | 0 | 16 | 32 |
| New Hampshire | 3 | 1 | 2 | 0 | .333 | 5 | 7 | 7 | 1 | 6 | 0 | 11 | 29 |
| Norwich | – | – | – | – | – | – | – | 2 | 1 | 1 | 0 | – | – |
| Princeton | 8 | 5 | 3 | 0 | .625 | 21 | 25 | 16 | 7 | 9 | 0 | 44 | 61 |
| Rensselaer | – | – | – | – | – | – | – | 6 | 2 | 4 | 0 | – | – |
| Saint Michael's | – | – | – | – | – | – | – | – | – | – | – | – | – |
| St. Lawrence | 2 | 0 | 2 | 0 | .000 | 1 | 4 | 2 | 0 | 2 | 0 | 1 | 4 |
| Syracuse | 6 | 2 | 2 | 2 | .500 | 8 | 7 | 7 | 3 | 2 | 2 | 10 | 7 |
| Union | 6 | 2 | 3 | 1 | .417 | 18 | 24 | 6 | 2 | 3 | 1 | 18 | 24 |
| Vermont | 4 | 1 | 3 | 0 | .250 | 18 | 11 | 5 | 2 | 3 | 0 | 20 | 11 |
| Williams | 15 | 10 | 4 | 1 | .700 | 59 | 23 | 18 | 12 | 5 | 1 | 72 | 28 |
| Yale | 10 | 1 | 8 | 1 | .150 | 9 | 23 | 14 | 4 | 9 | 1 | 25 | 30 |

== Schedule and results ==
| Date | Opponent | Site | Result | Record |
Regular Season
| January 13 | Dartmouth* | Stuart Rink • West Point, New York | L 1–5 | 0–1–0 |
| January 16 | Bates* | Stuart Rink • West Point, New York | W 4–3 | 1–1–0 |
| January 30 | Boston College ^{†}* | Stuart Rink • West Point, New York | L 3–7 | 1–2–0 |
| February | Amherst* | Stuart Rink • West Point, New York | W 4–2 | 2–2–0 |
| February 6 | vs. Boston University* | Bear Mountain Rink • Bear Mountain, New York | L 0–3 | 2–3–0 |
| February 10 | Massachusetts Agricultural* | Stuart Rink • West Point, New York | L 1–2 | 2–4–0 |
| February 13 | Syracuse* | Stuart Rink • West Point, New York | L 1–4 | 2–5–0 |
| February 17 | Middlebury* | Stuart Rink • West Point, New York | W 3–1 ^{‡} | 3–5–0 |
| February 22 | Williams* | Stuart Rink • West Point, New York | L 0–3 | 3–6–0 |
*Non-conference game.

† Boston College does not record a game against Army this season.
‡ Army records list the game as a 1–0 win, however, Army's account is missing the events of the third period.
