= 1925–26 MIT Engineers men's ice hockey season =

- Conference: Independent
- Home ice: Boston Arena

Record
- Overall: 3–6–0
- Road: 2–2–0
- Neutral: 1–4–0

Coaches and captains
- Head coach: Bill Stewart
- Captain: John Deignan

The 1925–26 MIT Engineers men's ice hockey season was the 25th season of play for the program. The Engineers were coached by Bill Stewart in his 1st season.

== Season ==
MIT had made great strides the year before but still had a disappointing season. In order to continue their improvement, Bill Stewart was brought in as the program's new coach. He was a local Baseball and ice hockey coach and referee who had several years experience coaching high school hockey. One thing he found upon his arrival was that the team already had a good pair of starting defensemen. Deke Crandall and Bill Berkeley had been the team's two best defenders a year before and began as the main guardians for team captain Johnny Deignan. Hard practices had the team in shape for the opening match but the Engineers were no match for the fearsome offense possessed by Boston University. Time and again the Terriers swept down the ice and while the defense did turn aside many attempts, poor play from Deignan saw the Terriers score on many attempts. After the captain was pulled for backup Richards, the scoring decreased but MIT could not mount a successful reply and lost 1–5. The team was back on the ice a week later against Boston College and had even less success. Despite a visible improvement to their offense, BC's defense was unfazed and limited the Engineers to but a few rushes up the ice. Randell's solo goal was the only think that interrupted the deluge of Eagle goals and MIT fell 1–7.

After the lopsided loses, coach Stewart changed the lineup by moving Berkeley to the forward unit with Brooks taking over on the blueline. The with MIT being able to carry the puck up the ice more consistently, the pressure on the defense was lessened and the Engineers were more successful in holding back Harvard. Deignan was back in goal and looked far sharper with a reduced workload. While he made 11 saves in the first period, he only had to contend with five afterwards and kept his team in the match until the final buzzer. The new-look Engineers fought hard and held a scoreless tie until the Crimson deployed their greatest advantage; numbers. Harvard used 18 different players in the game, allowing the team to play hard at all times and still have fresh legs on the ice. It was only after deploying a second platoon that Harvard managed to score. Even with that handicap, MIT allowed just two goals and showed a vast improvement over their first two contests.

The team then disbanded for the winter break and reconvened after Christmas. They took a short jaunt to Amherst to face Massachusetts Agricultural and used their early-season experience to great effect. While originally scheduled for the 6th, the game was delayed for three days due to inclement weather but the adverse conditions didn't hamper the Engineers in the slightest. Weissner got the ball rolling in the first with his second goal of the year while Berkeley and Freeman added scores in the second. Crandall saw to it that very few Aggie chances got on goal, allowing Deignan and Richards to combine for the shutout. The following week the team got a chance for revenge with a rematch against Boston University. Demonstrating just how far they had come in such a short time, MIT held the Terriers off of the scoresheet for over two periods thanks to wonderful performances by Crandall and Richards. The Engineers were held without a goal for most of the game as well but finally broke through in the third when Brooks deflected a puck in off of the goaltender's skate. Randell doubled the team's lead a few minutes later and MIT then pulled back to hold off the BU attack. One goal managed to leak through Richards but the defense held and the team had their second win 2–1.

Due to the exam period, the team's next game wasn't for almost a full month and the Engineers had to fortify themselves with early-morning practice in the meantime. The team kicked off its return with a trip up to Maine and with the team expected to win after its recent performances, coach Stewart changed up the lines. With Brooks and Berkeley swapping spots (defense for wing), MIT found itself with a surprising fight on its hands. A much improved Bowdoin team was able to score three goals on Richards. Fortunately, Randell was able to spur the offense with a pair of goals, the final being the game-winner. After their narrow escape, MIT was expecting an easier game from a down Bates team that had won just one of their 6 games to that point but the Bobcats shocked all onlookers by scoring 5 goals in the match. The Engineers appeared to be tired after such a strenuous game the night before and the defense could not hold off the home squad. Goals from Brooks, Randell and Weissner gave the Engineers three separate 2-goal leads but none of them held and the team fell 4–5.

MIT returned home for a brief respite before head back out again, this time travelling to face Dartmouth. Unfortunately for the Engineers, they were no match for the vaunted Indians and were overrun by the Green juggernaut. Randell nabbed the lone goal for Tech in an otherwise deflating game. Due to the quick turnaround, the rubber match with BU that had been slated for the 18th was delayed until later in the season. MIT was expecting to go on another road trip, this time to the west, but games against Syracuse and Union were cancelled due to a lack of ice.

The final game with BU occurred on March 1 and turned out to be one of the strangest games ever played. Both teams appeared to be sleeping through the first two periods with no real fight being shown by either squad. BU was eventually able to summon up some offensive punch and scored in the second period. After 30 minutes of play, George V. Brown, the owner of the Boston Arena, decided that he had seen enough and ended the game. Despite his assertions, Brown had no authority over either team or the referee and Frank Synott, who was the official for the match, did not follow Brown's order. Neither did the Engineers, who were looking to overcome a 1-goal deficit in the third period. However, Boston University had followed the orders and did not appear on the ice for the third period. With only one team on the ice, Synott blew the whistle and started play. MIT scored multiple goals with no opposition but coach Stewart soon ordered his team to cease and went into the BU locker room to convince the Terriers to return to play. While many were already in their street clothes, they did agree to play out the final period and eventually the game was resumed at 11:30. Stewart had the goals that were scored during the Terriers' absence voided as he did not want to win by forfeit and the few remaining fans were rewarded by a spirited effort in the final 15 minutes. Both teams redoubled their efforts and fought a pitched battle that resulted in many penalties and one more goal but that too was in BU's favor. The match ended with a 0–2 defeat for the Engineers but both the team and Stewart were commended for their sportsmanship.

Richard S. Carroll served as team manager with Herbert Whiting and Arnold Archibald as his assistants.

== Roster ==
No.	Nat.	Player	Class	Pos	Height	Weight	DoB	Hometown	Previous team
	(United States)	William P. Berkeley	Junior	D/RW			1905-07-13	Cambridge, Massachusetts
	(United States)	Samuel W. Brooks	Senior	D/RW			1904-09-27	Everett, Massachusetts
	(United States)	Frank J. Crandall	Junior	D			1904-01-01	Everett, Massachusetts
	(United States)	John E. Deignan (C)	Senior	G			1903-04-16	East Orange, New Jersey
	(United States)	John J. Fahey	Sophomore				1906-08-14	Derby, Connecticut
	(United States)	Raymond A. Freeman	Senior	LW/RW			1905-11-19	Boston, Massachusetts
	(United States)	Francis M. Mead	Sophomore				1906-10-23	Belmont, Massachusetts
	(Canada)	Walter J. Nock	Sophomore				1906-10-13	Mexico City, Mexico
	(United States)	Sumner S. Randell Jr.	Senior	C			1904-02-19	Quincy, Massachusetts
	(United States)	William H. Richards	Junior	G			1906-06-16	Boston, Massachusetts
	(Canada)	Thomas M. Rowlands	Senior				1897-12-20	Victoria, British Columbia
	(United States)	Otto B. Wiessner	Senior	LW/RW			1904-03-22	Brookline, Massachusetts

== Standings ==
1925–26 Eastern Collegiate ice hockey standings
	Intercollegiate							Overall					
	GP	W	L	T	Pct.	GF	GA	GP	W	L	T	GF	GA
Amherst	7	1	4	2	.286	11	28	7	1	4	2	11	28
Army	8	3	5	0	.375	14	23	9	3	6	0	17	30
Bates	9	3	5	1	.389	18	37	9	3	5	1	18	37
Boston College	3	2	1	0	.667	9	5	15	6	8	1	46	54
Boston University	11	7	4	0	.636	28	11	15	7	8	0	31	28
Bowdoin	6	4	2	0	.667	18	13	7	4	3	0	18	18
Clarkson	5	2	3	0	.400	10	13	8	4	4	0	25	25
Colby	5	0	4	1	.100	9	18	6	1	4	1	–	–
Cornell	6	2	4	0	.333	10	21	6	2	4	0	10	21
Dartmouth	–	–	–	–	–	–	–	15	12	3	0	72	34
Hamilton	–	–	–	–	–	–	–	10	7	3	0	–	–
Harvard	9	8	1	0	.889	34	13	11	8	3	0	38	20
Massachusetts Agricultural	8	3	4	1	.438	10	20	8	3	4	1	10	20
Middlebury	8	5	3	0	.625	19	16	8	5	3	0	19	16
MIT	9	3	6	0	.333	16	32	9	3	6	0	16	32
New Hampshire	3	1	2	0	.333	5	7	7	1	6	0	11	29
Norwich	–	–	–	–	–	–	–	2	1	1	0	–	–
Princeton	8	5	3	0	.625	21	25	16	7	9	0	44	61
Rensselaer	–	–	–	–	–	–	–	6	2	4	0	–	–
Saint Michael's	–	–	–	–	–	–	–	–	–	–	–	–	–
St. Lawrence	2	0	2	0	.000	1	4	2	0	2	0	1	4
Syracuse	6	2	2	2	.500	8	7	7	3	2	2	10	7
Union	6	2	3	1	.417	18	24	6	2	3	1	18	24
Vermont	4	1	3	0	.250	18	11	5	2	3	0	20	11
Williams	15	10	4	1	.700	59	23	18	12	5	1	72	28
Yale	10	1	8	1	.150	9	23	14	4	9	1	25	30

== Schedule and results ==
Date	Opponent	Site	Result	Record
Regular Season
December 4	vs. Boston University*	Boston Arena • Boston, Massachusetts	L 1–5	0–1–0
December 11	vs. Boston College*	Boston Arena • Boston, Massachusetts	L 1–7	0–2–0
December 16	vs. Harvard*	Boston Arena • Boston, Massachusetts	L 0–2	0–3–0
January 9	at Massachusetts Agricultural*	Alumni Field Rink • Amherst, Massachusetts	W 3–0	1–3–0
January 13	vs. Boston University*	Boston Arena • Boston, Massachusetts	W 2–1	2–3–0
February 12	at Bowdoin*	Delta Rink • Brunswick, Maine	W 4–3	3–3–0
February 13	at Bates*	Bartlett Street Rink • Lewiston, Maine	L 4–5	3–4–0
February 17	at Dartmouth*	Occom Pond • Hanover, New Hampshire	L 1–7	3–5–0
March 1	vs. Boston University*	Boston Arena • Boston, Massachusetts	L 0–2	3–6–0
*Non-conference game.

== Scoring statistics ==
Name	Position	Games	Goals
Sumner Randell	C	-	6
Sam Brooks	D/RW	-	4
Otto Weissner	LW/RW	-	3
Bill Berkeley	D/RW	-	2
Ray Freeman	LW	-	1
Deke Crandall	D	-	0
Johnny Deignan	G	-	0
John Fahey		-	0
Francis Mead		-	0
Walter Nock	RW	-	0
Tom Rowlands		-	0
Bill Richards	G	-	0
Total			16
