= 1925–26 Boston College Eagles men's ice hockey season =

- Conference: Independent
- Home ice: Boston Arena

Record
- Overall: 6–9–1
- Home: 1–6–1
- Road: 1–1–0
- Neutral: 4–2–0

Coaches and captains
- Head coach: Fred Rocque
- Captain: Henry Groden

The 1925–26 Boston College Eagles men's ice hockey season was the 9th season of play for the program. The Eagles were coached by Fred Rocque in his 4th season.

== Season ==
After the departure of Charles Foote as head coach, the Eagles welcomed Fred Rocque back as their bench boss. The biggest task at the outset was getting a very raw into shape as most of the experienced players had graduated the previous spring. The team played well in their opening match of the year, albeit against weak competition. Several days of hard practice followed in order to get ready for the invaders from the north. Just before Christmas, the team arranged a game against Pere Marquette, an amateur club made up of BC alumni, and the new boys looked be the equals of Eagle teams past. Unfortunately for the Eagles, their next opponent was one of the best amateur teams in all of Canada and they were unable to halt the attack from Toronto.

The next two games for the Eagles came at the brand new Madison Square Garden and they displayed a fine form by winning two games against Canadian colleges. Mullowney, one of the few returning starters, was particularly noteworthy against Montreal, scoring twice while also holding the Carabins' offense at bay. The team's difficult slate of games caught up to them afterwards, however, and BC dropped each of their next five matches. By the time the team halted for the exam break the once-high hopes for the season had been shattered. Even worse, a match with Army had to be scrapped on account of the weather, leaving Boston University as the only American college left on their schedule. A rematch with Pere Marquette to end the first half of the season capped off the losing streak and saw few in attendance, though the explanation given was that students were busy studying.

Upon their return from the break, the team got into a pitched battle with rival BU. The game was a fast, physical affair that saw many checks thrown by both sides but neither team was willing to give an inch. Mike Dee, getting his first turn as the starting netminder, but things got off to a poor start when a puck leaked through his legs for the first goal. Afterwards, Dee made up for the mistake with an inspired performance that allowed the Eagles to gain and hold the lead. Red Groden tied the match in the second while Ed Mullowney scored the winning marker in the third to give BC the lead for the Winsor Cup.

A week later, the team took a trip north to Montreal for a pair of games. After losing to an amateur team on the first night, the Eagles salvaged the weekend with a win over Loyola thanks to Cronin and Groden both scoring twice in the match. The Eagles had a long layoff before their next game but hard practices from coach Rocque prevent any rust from accumulating. The third match with Pere Marquette was just as tightly contested as the others but this time BC was able to come away with a draw. The following night, with bragging right on the line, BC was swamped by BU, due in no small part to the absence of Frank Mahoney. The Eagles held firm for the first part of the game but were dealt a second blow when Mullowney was cut above the knee by one of his teammates. After he was taken to the hospital for treatment, Boston College was a shell of itself and Boston University took full advantage. BU scored three times in the third to take the match and tie the season series.

Two weeks later, the team's season came to a close when they met the Canadian amateur champion, Ottawa Burgs. The win ended the season on a high note but the lack of intercollegiate matches left the Eagles unable to compete for a championship with their peers.

George L. O'Brien served as team manager.

== Roster ==
No.	Nat.	Player	Class	Pos	Height	Weight	DoB	Hometown	Previous team
	(United States)	Cornelius P. Cronin	Junior	RW				Cambridge, Massachusetts
	(United States)	Michael Dee		G				Cambridge, Massachusetts
	(United States)	John C. Drummond	Junior	G				Boston, Massachusetts
	(United States)	William J. Dunn	Senior	G				Newton, Massachusetts
	(United States)	Eugene M. Fitzgerald	Sophomore	G				Cambridge, Massachusetts
	(United States)	Joseph F. Fitzgerald	Sophomore	G/F				Boston, Massachusetts
	(United States)	Pierce J. Fitzgerald	Junior	C/LW				Cambridge, Massachusetts
	(United States)	Arthur J. Gorman	Senior					Roxbury, Massachusetts
	(United States)	Henry E. Groden (C)	Senior	LW				Cambridge, Massachusetts
	(United States)	John F. Kelleher	Sophomore	D				Cambridge, Massachusetts
	(United States)	Francis X. Mahoney	Senior	D				Cambridge, Massachusetts
	(United States)	William H. Mahoney Jr.	Senior	D				Cambridge, Massachusetts
	(United States)	R. Terrance McGovern	Junior					Brighton, Massachusetts
		Joseph McGrath	Junior
		Francis J. McNamara	Freshman	D
	(United States)	Arthur M. Morrissey	Freshman	D				Medford, Massachusetts
	(United States)	Edward O. Mullowney	Senior	C/D				Brookline, Massachusetts
	(United States)	Nicholas P. Tedesco	Freshman					West Newton, Massachusetts

== Standings ==
1925–26 Eastern Collegiate ice hockey standings
	Intercollegiate							Overall					
	GP	W	L	T	Pct.	GF	GA	GP	W	L	T	GF	GA
Amherst	7	1	4	2	.286	11	28	7	1	4	2	11	28
Army	8	3	5	0	.375	14	23	9	3	6	0	17	30
Bates	9	3	5	1	.389	18	37	9	3	5	1	18	37
Boston College	3	2	1	0	.667	9	5	15	6	8	1	46	54
Boston University	11	7	4	0	.636	28	11	15	7	8	0	31	28
Bowdoin	6	4	2	0	.667	18	13	7	4	3	0	18	18
Clarkson	5	2	3	0	.400	10	13	8	4	4	0	25	25
Colby	5	0	4	1	.100	9	18	6	1	4	1	–	–
Cornell	6	2	4	0	.333	10	21	6	2	4	0	10	21
Dartmouth	–	–	–	–	–	–	–	15	12	3	0	72	34
Hamilton	–	–	–	–	–	–	–	10	7	3	0	–	–
Harvard	9	8	1	0	.889	34	13	11	8	3	0	38	20
Massachusetts Agricultural	8	3	4	1	.438	10	20	8	3	4	1	10	20
Middlebury	8	5	3	0	.625	19	16	8	5	3	0	19	16
MIT	9	3	6	0	.333	16	32	9	3	6	0	16	32
New Hampshire	3	1	2	0	.333	5	7	7	1	6	0	11	29
Norwich	–	–	–	–	–	–	–	2	1	1	0	–	–
Princeton	8	5	3	0	.625	21	25	16	7	9	0	44	61
Rensselaer	–	–	–	–	–	–	–	6	2	4	0	–	–
Saint Michael's	–	–	–	–	–	–	–	–	–	–	–	–	–
St. Lawrence	2	0	2	0	.000	1	4	2	0	2	0	1	4
Syracuse	6	2	2	2	.500	8	7	7	3	2	2	10	7
Union	6	2	3	1	.417	18	24	6	2	3	1	18	24
Vermont	4	1	3	0	.250	18	11	5	2	3	0	20	11
Williams	15	10	4	1	.700	59	23	18	12	5	1	72	28
Yale	10	1	8	1	.150	9	23	14	4	9	1	25	30

== Schedule and results ==
Date	Opponent	Site	Result	Record
Regular Season
December 11	vs. MIT*	Boston Arena • Boston, Massachusetts	W 7–1	1–0–0
December 23	Pere Marquette*	Boston Arena • Boston, Massachusetts	L 2–3	1–1–0
December 26	Toronto*	Boston Arena • Boston, Massachusetts	L 1–6	1–2–0
December 28	vs. Royal Military College*	Madison Square Garden • Manhattan, New York	W 7–6	2–2–0
December 29	vs. Montreal*	Madison Square Garden • Manhattan, New York	W 4–2	3–2–0
December 31	McGill*	Boston Arena • Boston, Massachusetts	L 2–3	3–3–0
January 1	Toronto*	Boston Arena • Boston, Massachusetts	L 1–5	3–4–0
January 9	Toronto*	Boston Arena • Boston, Massachusetts (Exhibition)	L 0–2	
January 21	Truro*	Boston Arena • Boston, Massachusetts	L 3–6	3–5–0
January 27	vs. Pere Marquette*	Boston Arena • Boston, Massachusetts	L 3–4	3–6–0
February 4	vs. Boston University*	Boston Arena • Boston, Massachusetts (Rivalry)	W 2–1	4–6–0
February 12	at Sherbrooke Wanderers*	Mount Royal Arena • Montreal, Quebec	L 2–3	4–7–0
February 13	at Loyola*	Mount Royal Arena • Montreal, Quebec	W 5–3	5–7–0
March 3	Pere Marquette*	Rhode Island Auditorium • Providence, Rhode Island	T 5–5	5–7–1
March 4	vs. Boston University*	Boston Arena • Boston, Massachusetts (Rivalry)	L 0–3	5–8–1
March 12	Ottawa Burgs*	Boston Arena • Boston, Massachusetts	W 2–1	6–8–1
*Non-conference game.
