= 1925–26 Bowdoin Polar Bears men's ice hockey season =

Men's ice hockey

- Conference: Independent
- Home ice: Delta Rink

Record
- Overall: 4–3–0
- Home: 1–1–0
- Road: 3–2–0

Coaches and captains
- Head coach: Ben Houser
- Captain: Charles Cutter

The 1925–26 Bowdoin Polar Bears men's ice hockey season was the 7th season of play for the program.

== Season ==
In the offseason, the team received some welcome news when Ben Houser signed a 3-year contract to remain with the college. While primarily a baseball coach, his success in the abbreviated '25 season showed that he wasn't bad at leading the ice hockey team. Additionally, the team had come in well under budget, costing $283.48 against a total funding of $482.50. The team held its first meeting immediately after the conclusion of the football season and tried to get a jump on the year. With the team returning six veterans, hopes were high for the Bears and they attempted to put together an ambitious schedule that included a 3-game swing through Massachusetts. Construction on the rink was nearly complete by the second week of December, thanks in part to an early winter, and floodlight were installed so that games could be played at night. As part of a new initiative by the school, students were required to participate in at least one sport to encourage physical fitness. While track and field was by far the most popular, with 193 participants, ice hockey came in second with 62 men working out on a daily basis. The popularity of the relatively new sport, despite all of the problems that had occurred over the past several seasons, was good news for the long-term future of the program.

After the winter break, Bowdoin kicked off the year by heading to Lewiston. They first took on Bates and had the measure of the Bobcats all night. the Polar Bears more than doubled the Garnet in shots (36 to 17) and Berry didn't give an inch in goal. The offense came from all quarters: starting center (Cutter), defense (Cole) and reserve forward (Thayer) to give the Whites a total victory over a team that was typically the class of the state. The team stayed in town for a match against St. Dominique but the game devolved into an ugly affair for the Polar Bears. The team was widely outplayed and were swept off the ice 0–5. Jim Berry played a tremendous game in goal, stopping 45 shots in 45 minutes, an impressive feat under any circumstance. The Bears returned home for a match with Colby and got into a pitched battle with the Mules. The match started slow but soon the Bowdoin offense began attacking the opposing cage. Cutter scored twice to pace all players but the Colby netminder, Fagerstrom, was the star of the game. Fortunately, Berry played another strong game and allowed the Polar Bears to eke out a 3–2 victory.

Bowdoin travelled south the following week to take on Amherst, however, the games was cancelled due to bad weather. A couple of days later, Bowdoin took on Boston University for the second year in a row and had about a much success the second time around. The Bears were swept off the ice by the Terriers 0–6 and were unable to score despite attacking the BU goal throughout the game. The ice was choppy due to an earlier game between Harvard and Williams but Boston University didn't appear to have any difficulties in the match. Bowdoin returned to Maine afterwards to take on Bates in a rematch. Despite having to use mostly reserve players (Bucknam and Widen were the only regulars in the lineup) the Bears were able to pull out a narrow victory. Lord played an admirable game in goal to match the standard set by Berry. The win made Bowdoin a virtual lock for the state championship as only the rematch with Colby remained.

Bowdoin went into hibernation for the exam break and emerged with a match against MIT. The time off appeared to have softened the Bears' defense as they weren't able to sustain a strong effort over the course of the game. Bowdoin held an early lead but allowed two goals in both the second and third periods to let the game slip away from them. Berry played his weakest game of the season while Cutter led a valiant effort from the offense that fell short by 1 goal. The following day they travelled to face Colby and posted their best performance of the year. Despite poor ice, Bowdoin's offense was in high gear with Cutter netting a hat-trick. The Bears' defense was unassailable and notched its third shutout of the season to win both the game and the state championship.

After the program won its second consecutive title, calls for better facilities began with a request for the school to build a rink that would not be as vulnerable to the weather as their current venue. At the time, Hebron Academy and St. Dominique had both built rinks for about $25,000, a considerable sum of money at the time, but Reggie Forsythe argued that the team and the sport had proven themselves to be worthy of investment.

Aubrey Fenderson served as team manager.

== Roster ==
No.	Nat.	Player	Class	Pos	Height	Weight	DoB	Hometown	Previous team
	(United States)	James Berry	Graduate	G			1904-08-19	Harwich, Massachusetts
	(United States)	Gordon W. Bryant	Sophomore	RW			1906-03-08	Boston, Massachusetts
	(United States)	Gordon Bucknam	Senior	RW			1904-09-15	Newton, Massachusetts
	(United States)	Clarence L. Cole	Junior	D			1905-06-28	Limington, Maine
	(United States)	Charles N. Cutter (C)	Senior	C			1904-03-05	Somerville, Massachusetts
	(United States)	William W. Fisher	Senior	LW/RW			1904-06-05	Middletown, Connecticut
	(United States)	J. Reginald Forsythe	Junior	RW			1902-11-12	Middlebury, Vermont
	(United States)	John A. Lord	Junior	G			1904-08-18	Foxboro, Massachusetts
	(United States)	Parker H. Rice	Freshman	RW			1906-11-03	Cambridge, Massachusetts
	(United States)	Richard S. Thayer	Sophomore	LW			1905-10-31	Stoneham, Massachusetts
	(United States)	Paul Tiemer	Sophomore	C			1905-06-11	Orange, New Jersey
	(United States)	John W. Vahey	Junior	C			1904-12-31	Watertown, Massachusetts
	(United States)	William L. Walsh	Sophomore	D			1905-02-24	Lewiston, Maine
		Whitman		LW
	(United States)	William Widen	Senior	D			1902-12-09	Boston, Massachusetts

Note: Whitman was listed as a starting winger for the team, however, no Whitman was attending Bowdoin at the time. Its possible that this was actually a misidentified Gordon Whitman Bryant.

== Standings ==
1925–26 Eastern Collegiate ice hockey standings
	Intercollegiate							Overall					
	GP	W	L	T	Pct.	GF	GA	GP	W	L	T	GF	GA
Amherst	7	1	4	2	.286	11	28	7	1	4	2	11	28
Army	8	3	5	0	.375	14	23	9	3	6	0	17	30
Bates	9	3	5	1	.389	18	37	9	3	5	1	18	37
Boston College	3	2	1	0	.667	9	5	15	6	8	1	46	54
Boston University	11	7	4	0	.636	28	11	15	7	8	0	31	28
Bowdoin	6	4	2	0	.667	18	13	7	4	3	0	18	18
Clarkson	5	2	3	0	.400	10	13	8	4	4	0	25	25
Colby	5	0	4	1	.100	9	18	6	1	4	1	–	–
Cornell	6	2	4	0	.333	10	21	6	2	4	0	10	21
Dartmouth	–	–	–	–	–	–	–	15	12	3	0	72	34
Hamilton	–	–	–	–	–	–	–	10	7	3	0	–	–
Harvard	9	8	1	0	.889	34	13	11	8	3	0	38	20
Massachusetts Agricultural	8	3	4	1	.438	10	20	8	3	4	1	10	20
Middlebury	8	5	3	0	.625	19	16	8	5	3	0	19	16
MIT	9	3	6	0	.333	16	32	9	3	6	0	16	32
New Hampshire	3	1	2	0	.333	5	7	7	1	6	0	11	29
Norwich	–	–	–	–	–	–	–	2	1	1	0	–	–
Princeton	8	5	3	0	.625	21	25	16	7	9	0	44	61
Rensselaer	–	–	–	–	–	–	–	6	2	4	0	–	–
Saint Michael's	–	–	–	–	–	–	–	–	–	–	–	–	–
St. Lawrence	2	0	2	0	.000	1	4	2	0	2	0	1	4
Syracuse	6	2	2	2	.500	8	7	7	3	2	2	10	7
Union	6	2	3	1	.417	18	24	6	2	3	1	18	24
Vermont	4	1	3	0	.250	18	11	5	2	3	0	20	11
Williams	15	10	4	1	.700	59	23	18	12	5	1	72	28
Yale	10	1	8	1	.150	9	23	14	4	9	1	25	30

== Schedule and results ==
Date	Opponent	Site	Decision	Result	Record
Regular Season
January 9	at Bates*	Bartlett Street Rink • Lewiston, Maine	Berry	W 3–0	1–0–0
January 11	at St. Dominique*	Bartlett Street Rink • Lewiston, Maine	Berry	L 0–5	1–1–0
January 13	Colby*	Delta Rink • Brunswick, Maine	Berry	W 3–2	2–1–0
January 20	at Boston University*	Boston Arena • Boston, Massachusetts	Berry	L 0–6	2–2–0
January 23	at Bates*	Bartlett Street Rink • Lewiston, Maine (Exhibition)	Lord	W 1–0	
February 12	MIT*	Delta Rink • Brunswick, Maine	Berry	L 3–4	2–3–0
February 13	Colby*	Colby Rink • Waterville, Maine	Berry	W 5–0	3–3–0
February 17	at Bates*	Bartlett Street Rink • Lewiston, Maine	Berry	W 4–1	4–3–0
*Non-conference game.

== Scoring statistics ==
Name	Position	Games	Goals
Charlie Cutter	C	6	7
Clem Cole	D	6	4
Dick Thayer	LW	6	2
Whitman	LW	4	1
Gordon Bucknam	RW	7	1
Gordon Bryant	RW	1	0
John Lord	G	1	0
Reggie Forsythe	RW	1	0
Parker Rice	RW	1	0
John Vahey	C	1	0
Bill Walsh	D	1	0
Paul Tiemer	C	2	0
Bill Fisher	LW/RW	3	0
Jim Berry	G	6	0
Bill Widen	D	7	0
Total			15
