= 1925–26 New Hampshire Bulls men's ice hockey season =

- Conference: Independent
- Home ice: UNH Ice Rink

Record
- Overall: 1–6–0
- Home: 1–3–0
- Road: 0–3–0

Coaches and captains
- Head coach: Ernest Christensen
- Captain: Fred Fudge

The 1925–26 New Hampshire Bulls men's ice hockey season was the 2nd season of play for the program. The Bulls represented the University of New Hampshire and were coached by Ernest Christensen in his 1st season.

== Season ==
Before the season, Hank Swasey turned control of the program over to Ernest Christensen. The new coach got his team onto the campus rink as soon as possible to prepare for its opening game at the beginning of January. Unfortunately, One of the three returning starters, William Proudman, did not return to campus for the spring semester and would need to be replaced. Due to weather delays, the opening match was postponed for a week but the team was eventually able to play its first game in mind January.

In the program's first ever home game, the Exeter Town Team gave the squad a bloody nose, scoring twice in the first. Percival, the starting center, did his best to even the count, notching two goals for the home side but a third marker from the visitors gave UNH its first loss of the year. When games with Bates and Massachusetts Agricultural were cancelled, the Exeter team stepped in as understudies for a rematch. Blewett and Fudge were stars of the game for the Bulls, holding off the fast amateur club. Percival continued to be the only one able to score for UNH and recorded the program's fist hat-trick. Unfortunately, the rest of the team wasn't able to keep up and the visitors scored four goals at the end of periods when the Bulls were tiring.

At the end of the month, UNH took a road trip through Maine and saw their offensive woes come to a head. Percival remained the only Bull able to find the back of the net but, in the three games combined, he scored just a single marker. Despite a valiant effort from Blewett against the St. Jean Club, the Bulls were handed their third loss of the year. The following day, the team was overwhelmed by one of the top amateur clubs in the region and forced to play defense for almost the entire match. The Association of St. Dominique's hammered New Hampshire 0–11 for a fourth consecutive defeat. In the final game, the exhausted team was barely able to keep up with Bates. Even with Blewett making 32 saves in the match, the offense was non-existent and the club was now winless in five games.

In early February, New Hampshire played its first home intercollegiate game and the team finally produced a solid effort. Dearington, who was the overall star of the match, scored his first goal of the year, as did Ide and Fudge. Percival, who assisted on two of the goals, also scored one himself to give the team enough offense to finally win a match. The team wrapped up their season a week later at the winter carnival against Massachusetts Agricultural. Percival opened the scoring with his 8th goal of the season, but that was the only goal the Bulls could muster. The Aggies far more experienced sextet outplayed UNH in the latter half of the match and took the game 1–3.

== Roster ==
No.	Nat.	Player	Class	Pos	Height	Weight	DoB	Hometown	Previous team
	(United States)	Henry B. Applin	Senior	D			1902-04-14	Providence, Rhode Island
	(United States)	Edward Y. Blewett	Senior	G			1905-03-22	Braintree, Massachusetts
	(United States)	Roland F. Chandler	Sophomore	D/RW			1905-05-30	Winchester, New Hampshire
	(United States)	Searls Dearington	Junior	LW			1903-04-04	Thompson, Connecticut
	(United States)	James H. English	Junior	LW			1903-08-16	Manchester, New Hampshire
	(United States)	Frederic W. Fudge	Senior	D				Stoneham, Massachusetts
	(United States)	Leo F. Garvey	Sophomore	RW				Dover, New Hampshire
	(United States)	Nicholas P. Ide	Senior	RW			1903-02-28	Wayland, Massachusetts
	(United States)	Warren E. Percival	Sophomore	C			1904-07-21	Gorham, New Hampshire
	(United States)	Albert R. Reinhart	Sophomore	LW			1903-06-02	West Roxbury, Massachusetts
	(United States)	Edwin B. Vatter	Senior	D			1904-12-16	Wayland, Massachusetts

== Standings ==
1925–26 Eastern Collegiate ice hockey standings
	Intercollegiate							Overall					
	GP	W	L	T	Pct.	GF	GA	GP	W	L	T	GF	GA
Amherst	7	1	4	2	.286	11	28	7	1	4	2	11	28
Army	8	3	5	0	.375	14	23	9	3	6	0	17	30
Bates	9	3	5	1	.389	18	37	9	3	5	1	18	37
Boston College	3	2	1	0	.667	9	5	15	6	8	1	46	54
Boston University	11	7	4	0	.636	28	11	15	7	8	0	31	28
Bowdoin	6	4	2	0	.667	18	13	7	4	3	0	18	18
Clarkson	5	2	3	0	.400	10	13	8	4	4	0	25	25
Colby	5	0	4	1	.100	9	18	6	1	4	1	–	–
Cornell	6	2	4	0	.333	10	21	6	2	4	0	10	21
Dartmouth	–	–	–	–	–	–	–	15	12	3	0	72	34
Hamilton	–	–	–	–	–	–	–	10	7	3	0	–	–
Harvard	9	8	1	0	.889	34	13	11	8	3	0	38	20
Massachusetts Agricultural	8	3	4	1	.438	10	20	8	3	4	1	10	20
Middlebury	8	5	3	0	.625	19	16	8	5	3	0	19	16
MIT	9	3	6	0	.333	16	32	9	3	6	0	16	32
New Hampshire	3	1	2	0	.333	5	7	7	1	6	0	11	29
Norwich	–	–	–	–	–	–	–	2	1	1	0	–	–
Princeton	8	5	3	0	.625	21	25	16	7	9	0	44	61
Rensselaer	–	–	–	–	–	–	–	6	2	4	0	–	–
Saint Michael's	–	–	–	–	–	–	–	–	–	–	–	–	–
St. Lawrence	2	0	2	0	.000	1	4	2	0	2	0	1	4
Syracuse	6	2	2	2	.500	8	7	7	3	2	2	10	7
Union	6	2	3	1	.417	18	24	6	2	3	1	18	24
Vermont	4	1	3	0	.250	18	11	5	2	3	0	20	11
Williams	15	10	4	1	.700	59	23	18	12	5	1	72	28
Yale	10	1	8	1	.150	9	23	14	4	9	1	25	30

== Schedule and results ==
Date	Opponent	Site	Result	Record
Regular Season
January 16	Exeter Town Team*	UNH Ice Rink • Durham, New Hampshire	L 2–3	0–1–0
January 23	Exeter Town Team*	UNH Ice Rink • Durham, New Hampshire	L 3–4	0–2–0
January 28	at St. Jean's Club*	West End Arena • Waterville, Maine	L 1–4	0–3–0
January 29	at St. Dominique's*	Bartlett Street Rink • Lewiston, Maine	L 0–11	0–4–0
January 30	at Bates*	Bartlett Street Rink • Lewiston, Maine	L 0–2 ^{†}	0–5–0
February 6	Colby*	UNH Ice Rink • Durham, New Hampshire	W 4–2	1–5–0
February 13	Massachusetts Agricultural*	UNH Ice Rink • Durham, New Hampshire	L 1–3	1–6–0
*Non-conference game.

† Bates records the score of the game as 0–1 in their favor.

== Scoring statistics ==
Name	Position	Games	Goals
Warren Percival	C	-	8
Searls Dearington	LW	-	1
Fred Fudge	D	-	1
Doc Ide	RW	-	1
Hank Applin	D	-	0
Duke Blewett	G	-	0
Baron Chandler	D/RW	-	0
Jim English	LW	-	0
Leo Garvey	RW	-	0
Al Reinheart	LW	-	0
Ed Vatter	D	-	0
Total			11
