= 1925–26 Union Skating Dutchmen ice hockey season =

- Conference: Independent
- Home ice: Central Park Rink

Record
- Overall: 2–3–1
- Home: 1–0–1
- Road: 1–3–0

Coaches and captains
- Head coach: Harold A. Larrabee
- Captain: John Gilmour

The 1925–26 Union Skating Dutchmen men's ice hockey season was the 13th season of play for the program. The Skating Dutchmen represented Union College and were coached by Harold A. Larrabee in his 1st season.

== Season ==
After a disastrous season the year before, it wasn't a surprise that the team was in search of a new coach at the start of the campaign. Training got underway in early January with team captain John Gilmour assuming the responsibilities of leadership. The first practices were held at the Mohawk Golf Club while the rink at Central Park was being finished. Many of the players ho had finished the year returned but of the six men who were ruled ineligible after the February exams, only Howard Hall was back with the team.

The Dutchmen got off to a quick start in their opening game. The forward combination of Gilmour, Clifford and Hyland was able to generate several scoring chances that resulted in a hat-trick for Hyland. The completely revamped defense manned by Schultze and Stone managed to hold off the Bobcats' attack while Bishop, another newcomer in goal, was key in Union's victory. After a game with Clarkson was cancelled on account of poor ice, the team travelled to Clinton to face Hamilton to following week. Slattery, another player who had been forced off the team last season, returned but his presence on the blueline didn't help the Dutchmen overcome the Continentals. Though no as bad as their last meeting, Hamilton still won in a walkover. Hyland opened the scoring early in the first and the team played well until the start of the second. From that point on the game was controlled by the Continentals and ended with the score 1–8.

With the upcoming exam break, the team paused until mid-February. During this time, H. A. Larrabee was brought in to be the team's coach. Upon their return, the Dutchmen didn't look any worse for wear and played well against Amherst. Clifford scored twice and had his team in the lead in the third, however, Amherst tied the score in the waning moments. Because both teams were active the following day, the two agreed to forgo any overtime and the match was called a draw. Clifford and Schultze swapped their positions for the next match as Union sought to get one over on Rensselaer. Hyland had suffered a slight injury in the Amherst game but attempted to gut it out against the Engineers. He was able to help Clifford and Gilmore score in the game but Union came up a goal shy.

A week later the team hit the road and headed to Vermont. Hyland had aggravated his leg injury against RPI and was doubtful for either of the two games up north. Despite the concern, he ended up playing a starring role in moth matches. Union got off to a good start against Vermont but ended up squandering their lead as the Catamounts forced overtime. Vermont then scored at the start of the overtime session to put the Dutchmen on the brink. Union fought back in the brief time they had remaining and managed to cage two shots in the final seconds to pull out a 5–4 victory. Two days later Union followed a similar scrip with Clifford twice giving the team a 1-goal lead. Neither edge held and Middlebury eventually scored the winning goal in the final minute of play.

Don Shannon served as team manager.

== Roster ==
No.	Nat.	Player	Class	Pos	Height	Weight	DoB	Hometown	Previous team
		Storrs M. Bishop Jr.	Senior	G
		Leslie P. Clifford	Junior	RW
		John G. Gilmour (C)	Junior	LW
	(United States)	Donald F. Hyland	Sophomore	C			1904-12-14	Utica, New York
		Charles G. Roberts	Sophomore	C/LW
		Paul E. Schultze Jr.	Sophomore	D
		Hugh J. Slattery	Senior	D
		Roger T. Stone	Sophomore	D			1906-04-05
	(United States)	Nelson R. Zeitler	Senior	D			1902-12-02	Albany, New York

== Standings ==
1925–26 Eastern Collegiate ice hockey standings
	Intercollegiate							Overall					
	GP	W	L	T	Pct.	GF	GA	GP	W	L	T	GF	GA
Amherst	7	1	4	2	.286	11	28	7	1	4	2	11	28
Army	8	3	5	0	.375	14	23	9	3	6	0	17	30
Bates	9	3	5	1	.389	18	37	9	3	5	1	18	37
Boston College	3	2	1	0	.667	9	5	15	6	8	1	46	54
Boston University	11	7	4	0	.636	28	11	15	7	8	0	31	28
Bowdoin	6	4	2	0	.667	18	13	7	4	3	0	18	18
Clarkson	5	2	3	0	.400	10	13	8	4	4	0	25	25
Colby	5	0	4	1	.100	9	18	6	1	4	1	–	–
Cornell	6	2	4	0	.333	10	21	6	2	4	0	10	21
Dartmouth	–	–	–	–	–	–	–	15	12	3	0	72	34
Hamilton	–	–	–	–	–	–	–	10	7	3	0	–	–
Harvard	9	8	1	0	.889	34	13	11	8	3	0	38	20
Massachusetts Agricultural	8	3	4	1	.438	10	20	8	3	4	1	10	20
Middlebury	8	5	3	0	.625	19	16	8	5	3	0	19	16
MIT	9	3	6	0	.333	16	32	9	3	6	0	16	32
New Hampshire	3	1	2	0	.333	5	7	7	1	6	0	11	29
Norwich	–	–	–	–	–	–	–	2	1	1	0	–	–
Princeton	8	5	3	0	.625	21	25	16	7	9	0	44	61
Rensselaer	–	–	–	–	–	–	–	6	2	4	0	–	–
Saint Michael's	–	–	–	–	–	–	–	–	–	–	–	–	–
St. Lawrence	2	0	2	0	.000	1	4	2	0	2	0	1	4
Syracuse	6	2	2	2	.500	8	7	7	3	2	2	10	7
Union	6	2	3	1	.417	18	24	6	2	3	1	18	24
Vermont	4	1	3	0	.250	18	11	5	2	3	0	20	11
Williams	15	10	4	1	.700	59	23	18	12	5	1	72	28
Yale	10	1	8	1	.150	9	23	14	4	9	1	25	30

== Schedule and results ==
Date	Opponent	Site	Result	Record
Regular Season
January 15	Bates*	Central Park Rink • Schenectady, New York	W 4–2	1–0–0
January 23	at Hamilton*	Russell Sage Rink • Clinton, New York	L 1–8	1–1–0
February 12	Amherst*	Central Park Rink • Schenectady, New York	T 3–3	1–1–1
February 13	at Rensselaer*	RPI Rink • Troy, New York (Rivalry)	L 2–3	1–2–1
February 20	at Vermont*	Kirby's Rink • Winooski, Vermont	W 5–4	2–2–1
February 22	at Middlebury*	Middlebury Rink • Middlebury, Vermont	L 3–4	2–3–1
*Non-conference game.
