= 1925–26 Middlebury Panthers men's ice hockey season =

- Conference: Independent
- Home ice: Middlebury Rink

Record
- Overall: 5–3–0
- Home: 2–0–0
- Road: 3–3–0

Coaches and captains
- Head coach: William McLaughlin
- Captain: William McLaughlin

The 1925–26 Middlebury Panthers men's ice hockey season was the 4th season of play for the program. The Panthers were led by player/coach by William McLaughlin in his 1st season.

== Season ==
After having their previous season ruined on account of poor weather, Middlebury was hoping for better luck in 1926. Most of the starters from last season returned, giving the Panthers a solid foundation for the club, who was once against led by its team captain. However, despite the experience, the team completely remade its forward line with Hill and Simmons flanking Whittemore. Hal Whittemore had been a member of the team in 1925 but did not play in either of their two games.

The Panthers began the season against Hamilton for a second consecutive year and produced a far better outcome. Whittemore scored twice against the Continentals, becoming the first player in program history to have a multi-goal game. Not only that, it was the first time the Panthers had ever recorded more than 1 goal in a game as a team. Conley performed well in goal, being aided from the experienced duo of Twitchell and McLaughlin, and held Hamilton to 2 goals in regulation. The teams agreed to play two 5-minute overtime periods where the home squad secured the winning tally. The team was overjoyed with their performance, which was a far sight better than the 0–8 loss they had suffered a year before.

The team had well over a month before their next game thanks to continued warm weather. However, when February rolled around the temperature finally dropped low enough for games to be played. Hurriedly, scheduled were rearranged to take advantage of the weather and Middlebury took a trip to Amherst right after the exam break. The first game, against Massachusetts Agricultural, saw Whittemore produce his second 2-goal game however, this time he was able to get the winning goal in overtime. Whittemore had been switched to wing for the match with newly added Kelley and Bossert playing at center. Though the Panthers were outplayed for stretches, Conley played another strong match and turned aside several scoring opportunities. Two days later the team travelled across town to take on Amherst but they were slow getting out of the gate. The Lord Jeffs tallied three times in the first period and the Panthers were forced to play catchup for the rest of the match. The Sabrinas' defense was formidable in the match and allowed Middlebury few chances. It wasn't until the waning minutes of the game that the team was finally able to get on the scoresheet. Twitchell and Whittemore found the back of the net but the time ran out before the tying goal could be secured.

Middlebury returned home to prepare for the first match of their series with Vermont. For the first official meeting between the two schools, Middlebury was without Whittemore and Hill as they had been ruled academically ineligible to compete. Despite the loss of their best goal-scorer, the match was dominated by the Panthers who spent most of the night in the Vermont end. Kelley, now the starter at center, was the star of the game and recorded the program's first hat-trick. Shortly after the game, the team rushed off to New York for two games that had been scheduled earlier in the year. Army played a tough brand of defense that stymied the Panthers for most of the match. It wasn't until the beginning of the third that Kelley was able to get Middlebury on the scoresheet, however, a late flurry by the Cadets enabled the home team to walk away with a win. Middlebury then travelled to face Renssealer and found themselves having to brawl for the win. Gruggel opened the scoring with his first career marker at the start of the game. Afterwards, the two battled it out over the ice with a multitude of penalties being awarded to either side. RPI tied the score just before the end of regulation to force overtime. In the single 10-minute extra period, Simmons scored from a scrimmage in front of the net and the team was able to continue their solid defensive effort until time expired.

After evening their record, the team received welcome news that their home rink was finally in a usable state. The final two games of the year were played on back-to-back nights and the team was able to reward the devotion of the student body with a pair of wins. In a fast match with Union, Twitchell scored twice on a pair of long shots while the winning tally was recorded by Simmons after a mad dash down the left wing boards. The next evening, Middlebury downed Vermont for a second time with another 2-goal effort from Kelley. Conley was unbeatable in the game, stopping every shot from the visitors for his first career shutout.

Lester W. Schaefer served as team manager with H. Carleton Seymour as his assistant.

== Roster ==
No.	Nat.	Player	Class	Pos	Height	Weight	DoB	Hometown	Previous team
	(United States)	Frederick G. Bossert	Freshman	C/RW			1907-08-15	Brooklyn, New York
	(United States)	Ronald P. Burrows	Freshman	RW			1907-06-11	St. Johnsbury, Vermont
	(United States)	John T. Conley	Senior	G				Brockton, Massachusetts
	(United States)	Folke Gruggel	Freshman	C/RW			1908-02-28	Beechhurst, New York
	(United States)	Ralph A. Hill	Sophomore	LW/RW			1906-03-23	Walpole, Massachusetts
	(United States)	Otis R. Jason	Freshman	LW			1908-02-09	Cohasset, Massachusetts
	(United States)	Stillman F. Kelley II	Freshman	C			1906-06-03	Lexington, Massachusetts
	(United States)	William J. McLaughlin (C)	Senior	D				Dorchester, Massachusetts
	(United States)	Carleton H. Simmons	Sophomore	LW			1905-06-04	Wellesley Hills, Massachusetts
	(United States)	Edward S. Twitchell	Senior	D				New Britain, Connecticut
	(United States)	Harold B. Whittemore	Sophomore	C/RW			1903-05-10	Brookline, Massachusetts

== Standings ==
1925–26 Eastern Collegiate ice hockey standings
	Intercollegiate							Overall					
	GP	W	L	T	Pct.	GF	GA	GP	W	L	T	GF	GA
Amherst	7	1	4	2	.286	11	28	7	1	4	2	11	28
Army	8	3	5	0	.375	14	23	9	3	6	0	17	30
Bates	9	3	5	1	.389	18	37	9	3	5	1	18	37
Boston College	3	2	1	0	.667	9	5	15	6	8	1	46	54
Boston University	11	7	4	0	.636	28	11	15	7	8	0	31	28
Bowdoin	6	4	2	0	.667	18	13	7	4	3	0	18	18
Clarkson	5	2	3	0	.400	10	13	8	4	4	0	25	25
Colby	5	0	4	1	.100	9	18	6	1	4	1	–	–
Cornell	6	2	4	0	.333	10	21	6	2	4	0	10	21
Dartmouth	–	–	–	–	–	–	–	15	12	3	0	72	34
Hamilton	–	–	–	–	–	–	–	10	7	3	0	–	–
Harvard	9	8	1	0	.889	34	13	11	8	3	0	38	20
Massachusetts Agricultural	8	3	4	1	.438	10	20	8	3	4	1	10	20
Middlebury	8	5	3	0	.625	19	16	8	5	3	0	19	16
MIT	9	3	6	0	.333	16	32	9	3	6	0	16	32
New Hampshire	3	1	2	0	.333	5	7	7	1	6	0	11	29
Norwich	–	–	–	–	–	–	–	2	1	1	0	–	–
Princeton	8	5	3	0	.625	21	25	16	7	9	0	44	61
Rensselaer	–	–	–	–	–	–	–	6	2	4	0	–	–
Saint Michael's	–	–	–	–	–	–	–	–	–	–	–	–	–
St. Lawrence	2	0	2	0	.000	1	4	2	0	2	0	1	4
Syracuse	6	2	2	2	.500	8	7	7	3	2	2	10	7
Union	6	2	3	1	.417	18	24	6	2	3	1	18	24
Vermont	4	1	3	0	.250	18	11	5	2	3	0	20	11
Williams	15	10	4	1	.700	59	23	18	12	5	1	72	28
Yale	10	1	8	1	.150	9	23	14	4	9	1	25	30

== Schedule and results ==
Date	Opponent	Site	Decision	Result	Record
Regular Season
December 18	at Hamilton*	Russell Sage Rink • Clinton, New York	Conley	L 2–3 ^{2OT}	0–1–0
February 6	at Massachusetts Agricultural*	Alumni Field Rink • Amherst, Massachusetts	Conley	W 2–1 ^{2OT}	1–1–0
February 8	at Amherst*	Pratt Field Rink • Amherst, Massachusetts	Conley	L 2–3	1–2–0
February 15	at Vermont*	Kirby's Rink • Winooski, Vermont	Conley	W 3–2	2–2–0
February 17	at Army*	Stuart Rink • West Point, New York	Conley	L 1–3	2–3–0
February 20	at Renssealer*	RPI Rink • Troy, New York	Conley	W 2–1 ^{OT}	3–3–0
February 22	Union*	Middlebury Rink • Middlebury, Vermont	Conley	W 4–3	4–3–0
February 23	Vermont*	Middlebury Rink • Middlebury, Vermont	Conley	W 3–0	5–3–0
*Non-conference game.

== Scoring statistics ==
Name	Position	Games	Goals
Still Kelley	C	7	7
Hal Whittemore	C/RW	3	5
Ed Twitchell	D	8	3
Carleton Simmons	LW	8	2
Barney Gruggle	C/RW	4	1
Fred Bossert	C/RW	6	1
Ron Burrows	RW	1	0
Red Hill	LW/RW	3	0
Shorty Jason	LW	3	0
John Conley	G	8	0
William McLaughlin	D	8	0
Total			19
