= 1925–26 Cornell Big Red men's ice hockey season =

Intercollegiate hockey season

- Home ice: Beebe Lake

Record
- Overall: 2–4–0
- Home: 1–3–0
- Road: 1–1–0

Coaches and captains
- Head coach: Nick Bawlf
- Captain: Benjamin Tilton

The 1925–26 Cornell Big Red men's ice hockey season was the 21st season of play for the program. The teams was coached by Nick Bawlf in his 6th season.

== Season ==
The Big Red began practicing in mid December with six games on their slate. In spite of the unpredictable nature of the weather, most of Cornell's game were scheduled to take place at Ithaca. With captain Tilton and Edminster forming the backbone of the team, the roster was compiled in early January and many of the players were familiar faces. One new arrival came in goal, Nash, necessitated by last year's starter having graduated. The team performed well in their first game with Tilton earning the game-winner with less than 3 minutes remaining.

There was considerable improvement in the team over the course of the following week, but their next opponent, Dartmouth was a very strong outfit. The Indians ended up proving that with a 12–1 demolition, including 6 goals in the first. Tilton's goal was one of the few bright lights for the squad and, despite the score, Nash was credited with solid play in net. The next game for the team was much closer but still resulted in a loss. Boston University kept the Big Red from scoring a single goal and recorded their only tally of the game in the waning minutes. The defeat left a foul taste in the team's mouth over the examination break and they were champing at the bit by early February.

Williams was next and coach Bawlf made several changed to the lineup. Ayers, a new entry, was put in as a starter on defense while Hoyt, now eligible in the new term, replaced Cooke at Left Wing. The new arrangement saw Cornell produce its biggest offensive output but the Ephs were able to use a fast start to say ahead of the Ithacans and win the match. The team continued its run of 1-goal losses against Princeton before finally winning its second game of the season to end the year. The final match was the first between Cornell and nearby Syracuse University on the ice and the Big Red earned their first shutout in over 3 years.

Tilton led the team with 7 goals.

== Roster ==
No.	Nat.	Player	Class	Pos	Height	Weight	DoB	Hometown	Previous team
	(United States)	Richard Aronson	Senior	LW/RW				Winthrop, Massachusetts
	(United States)	Joseph W. Ayers	Junior	D				Easton, Pennsylvania
	(United States)	Frank R. Benton Jr.	Junior	LW				Ithaca, New York
	(United States)	Frederick W. Boesche	Junior	D				Ithaca, New York
	(Canada)	Hugh Breckenridge	Senior	RW				Hamilton, Ontario
	(United States)	Joseph A. Cooke	Junior	LW/RW				Buffalo, New York
	(United States)	Frank C. Edminster Jr.	Senior	D				Ithaca, New York
	(United States)	Phillips B. Hoyt	Junior	LW				Indianapolis, Indiana
	(United States)	Arthur L. Nash	Junior	G				Queens, New York
		Andrew G. Sharp	Sophomore	RW
	(United States)	James B. Taylor Jr.	Sophomore	D				Ithaca, New York
	(United States)	Benjamin E. Tilton Jr. (C)	Senior	C				Washington D. C.
	(United States)	Thomas D. Watkins Jr.	Sophomore	LW/RW				Utica, New York

== Standings ==
1925–26 Eastern Collegiate ice hockey standings
	Intercollegiate							Overall					
	GP	W	L	T	Pct.	GF	GA	GP	W	L	T	GF	GA
Amherst	7	1	4	2	.286	11	28	7	1	4	2	11	28
Army	8	3	5	0	.375	14	23	9	3	6	0	17	30
Bates	9	3	5	1	.389	18	37	9	3	5	1	18	37
Boston College	3	2	1	0	.667	9	5	15	6	8	1	46	54
Boston University	11	7	4	0	.636	28	11	15	7	8	0	31	28
Bowdoin	6	4	2	0	.667	18	13	7	4	3	0	18	18
Clarkson	5	2	3	0	.400	10	13	8	4	4	0	25	25
Colby	5	0	4	1	.100	9	18	6	1	4	1	–	–
Cornell	6	2	4	0	.333	10	21	6	2	4	0	10	21
Dartmouth	–	–	–	–	–	–	–	15	12	3	0	72	34
Hamilton	–	–	–	–	–	–	–	10	7	3	0	–	–
Harvard	9	8	1	0	.889	34	13	11	8	3	0	38	20
Massachusetts Agricultural	8	3	4	1	.438	10	20	8	3	4	1	10	20
Middlebury	8	5	3	0	.625	19	16	8	5	3	0	19	16
MIT	9	3	6	0	.333	16	32	9	3	6	0	16	32
New Hampshire	3	1	2	0	.333	5	7	7	1	6	0	11	29
Norwich	–	–	–	–	–	–	–	2	1	1	0	–	–
Princeton	8	5	3	0	.625	21	25	16	7	9	0	44	61
Rensselaer	–	–	–	–	–	–	–	6	2	4	0	–	–
Saint Michael's	–	–	–	–	–	–	–	–	–	–	–	–	–
St. Lawrence	2	0	2	0	.000	1	4	2	0	2	0	1	4
Syracuse	6	2	2	2	.500	8	7	7	3	2	2	10	7
Union	6	2	3	1	.417	18	24	6	2	3	1	18	24
Vermont	4	1	3	0	.250	18	11	5	2	3	0	20	11
Williams	15	10	4	1	.700	59	23	18	12	5	1	72	28
Yale	10	1	8	1	.150	9	23	14	4	9	1	25	30

== Schedule and results ==
Date	Opponent	Site	Result	Record
Regular season
January 9	Clarkson*	Beebe Lake • Ithaca, New York	W 2–1	1–0–0
January 16	at Dartmouth*	Occom Pond • Hanover, New Hampshire	L 1–12	1–1–0
January 23	Boston University*	Beebe Lake • Ithaca, New York	L 0–1	1–2–0
February 5	Williams*	Beebe Lake • Ithaca, New York	L 4–5	1–3–0
February 17	Princeton*	Beebe Lake • Ithaca, New York	L 1–2	1–4–0
February 20	at Syracuse*	Syracuse, New York	W 2–0	2–4–0
*Non-conference game.
