= 1925–26 Harvard Crimson men's ice hockey season =

College ice hockey season

Eastern Intercollegiate Champion Triangular League, Champion
- Conference: 1st Triangular League
- Home ice: Boston Arena

Record
- Overall: 8–3–0
- Conference: 4–0–0
- Home: 6–2–0
- Road: 1–0–0
- Neutral: 1–1–0

Coaches and captains
- Head coach: Edward Bigelow
- Captain: Thayer Cummings

The 1925–26 Harvard Crimson men's ice hockey season was the 28th season of play for the program.

== Season ==
After surrendering the league championship to Yale two years running, Harvard was desperate to regain their crown. Early in the season, however, the team didn't perform well. After a less-than-impressive win over MIT the Crimson lost three consecutive games, however, two of those losses were to Canadian schools and the experience from playing tougher squads served Harvard well. When they opened their conference schedule against Princeton Harvard started slow but built up steam after the first to score the final three goals of the game, including an overtime winner from new sophomore star John Chase. The rematch came at the end of the month and the Crimson again had to come back from a two-goal deficit to win another 4–3 match and capture the season series.

Harvard began February with a game against undefeated Hamilton but the Crimson proved superior with a dominating 11–1 victory. The team then had a 10-day layoff before the long-awaited match with Yale. From the start of the game Harvard assailed the Eli net and scored just five minutes in. Three more goals came from Crimson players with none in opposition giving Harvard the first leg of the series. The following week Harvard faced a dangerous Dartmouth team and downed the Indians 3–2 in overtime. In doing so the Crimson had essentially erased their early-season loss to Boston University by defeating two teams that had defeated the Terriers (Williams and Dartmouth) while remaining unbeaten against all other colleges.

Harvard, however, still had one final game to play and the rematch with Yale was held at the Madison Square Garden, the home of the New York Americans. The game was played before some 11,000 spectators, by far the largest recorded crowd for a college game at the time, and saw Harvard fight a much tougher contest with the Elis than the first game. Harvard scored first but were unable to find the net again and had to carry a slim, 1–0 lead for most of the game. Captain Cummings did everything he could to keep the Elis from scoring and even with a furious effort in the third period the Yale scoresheet remained empty. Harvard tacked on a second goal just before the end of the game for a sweep of the Triangular League and a claim for the eastern Intercollegiate Championship.

== Roster ==
| No. | Nat. | Player | Class | Pos | Height | Weight | DoB | Hometown | Previous team |
|---|---|---|---|---|---|---|---|---|---|
| | (United States) | John P. Chase | Sophomore | C | | | 1906-06-12 | Milton, Massachusetts |
| | | Eben C. Clark | Senior | D |
| | | Clement D. Coady | Junior | D |
| | | George Crawford | Sophomore | D/RW |
| | (United States) | Thayer Cummings (C) | Senior | G | | | | New York, New York |
| | | John B. Durant | Junior | C/RW |
| | | William P. Ellison | Junior | D |
| | | Courtland S. Gross | Junior | LW |
| | | Nathaniel Hamlen | Junior | RW |
| | | Charles L. Harding Jr. | Senior | LW/D |
| | | Nathaniel S. Howe | Senior | LW/D |
| | | Joseph Morill Jr. | Sophomore | D |
| | | Laurence O. Pratt | Senior | D | | | 1904-05-07 |
| | | Richard S. Scott | Junior | C |
| | | Cecil I. Wylde | Junior | LW |
| | | Isadore Zarakov | Junior | LW/RW |

== Standings ==
1925–26 Eastern Collegiate ice hockey standings
| | Intercollegiate | | | | | | | Overall | | | | | |
| | GP | W | L | T | Pct. | GF | GA | GP | W | L | T | GF | GA |
|---|---|---|---|---|---|---|---|---|---|---|---|---|---|
| Amherst | 7 | 1 | 4 | 2 | .286 | 11 | 28 | 7 | 1 | 4 | 2 | 11 | 28 |
| Army | 8 | 3 | 5 | 0 | .375 | 14 | 23 | 9 | 3 | 6 | 0 | 17 | 30 |
| Bates | 9 | 3 | 5 | 1 | .389 | 18 | 37 | 9 | 3 | 5 | 1 | 18 | 37 |
| Boston College | 3 | 2 | 1 | 0 | .667 | 9 | 5 | 15 | 6 | 8 | 1 | 46 | 54 |
| Boston University | 11 | 7 | 4 | 0 | .636 | 28 | 11 | 15 | 7 | 8 | 0 | 31 | 28 |
| Bowdoin | 6 | 4 | 2 | 0 | .667 | 18 | 13 | 7 | 4 | 3 | 0 | 18 | 18 |
| Clarkson | 5 | 2 | 3 | 0 | .400 | 10 | 13 | 8 | 4 | 4 | 0 | 25 | 25 |
| Colby | 5 | 0 | 4 | 1 | .100 | 9 | 18 | 6 | 1 | 4 | 1 | – | – |
| Cornell | 6 | 2 | 4 | 0 | .333 | 10 | 21 | 6 | 2 | 4 | 0 | 10 | 21 |
| Dartmouth | – | – | – | – | – | – | – | 15 | 12 | 3 | 0 | 72 | 34 |
| Hamilton | – | – | – | – | – | – | – | 10 | 7 | 3 | 0 | – | – |
| Harvard | 9 | 8 | 1 | 0 | .889 | 34 | 13 | 11 | 8 | 3 | 0 | 38 | 20 |
| Massachusetts Agricultural | 8 | 3 | 4 | 1 | .438 | 10 | 20 | 8 | 3 | 4 | 1 | 10 | 20 |
| Middlebury | 8 | 5 | 3 | 0 | .625 | 19 | 16 | 8 | 5 | 3 | 0 | 19 | 16 |
| MIT | 9 | 3 | 6 | 0 | .333 | 16 | 32 | 9 | 3 | 6 | 0 | 16 | 32 |
| New Hampshire | 3 | 1 | 2 | 0 | .333 | 5 | 7 | 7 | 1 | 6 | 0 | 11 | 29 |
| Norwich | – | – | – | – | – | – | – | 2 | 1 | 1 | 0 | – | – |
| Princeton | 8 | 5 | 3 | 0 | .625 | 21 | 25 | 16 | 7 | 9 | 0 | 44 | 61 |
| Rensselaer | – | – | – | – | – | – | – | 6 | 2 | 4 | 0 | – | – |
| Saint Michael's | – | – | – | – | – | – | – | – | – | – | – | – | – |
| St. Lawrence | 2 | 0 | 2 | 0 | .000 | 1 | 4 | 2 | 0 | 2 | 0 | 1 | 4 |
| Syracuse | 6 | 2 | 2 | 2 | .500 | 8 | 7 | 7 | 3 | 2 | 2 | 10 | 7 |
| Union | 6 | 2 | 3 | 1 | .417 | 18 | 24 | 6 | 2 | 3 | 1 | 18 | 24 |
| Vermont | 4 | 1 | 3 | 0 | .250 | 18 | 11 | 5 | 2 | 3 | 0 | 20 | 11 |
| Williams | 15 | 10 | 4 | 1 | .700 | 59 | 23 | 18 | 12 | 5 | 1 | 72 | 28 |
| Yale | 10 | 1 | 8 | 1 | .150 | 9 | 23 | 14 | 4 | 9 | 1 | 25 | 30 |

1925–26 Triangular Hockey League standings
| | Conference | | | | | | | | Overall | | | | | |
| | GP | W | L | T | PTS | SW | GF | GA | GP | W | L | T | GF | GA |
|---|---|---|---|---|---|---|---|---|---|---|---|---|---|---|
| Harvard * | 4 | 4 | 0 | 0 | 1.000 | 2 | 14 | 6 | 11 | 8 | 3 | 0 | 38 | 20 |
| Princeton | 4 | 2 | 2 | 0 | .500 | 1 | 12 | 11 | 16 | 7 | 9 | 0 | 44 | 61 |
| Yale | 4 | 0 | 4 | 0 | .000 | 0 | 3 | 12 | 14 | 4 | 9 | 1 | 25 | 30 |
* indicates conference champion

== Schedule and results ==
| Date | Opponent | Site | Result | Record |
Regular season
| December 16 | vs. MIT* | Boston Arena • Boston, Massachusetts | W 2–0 | 1–0–0 |
| December 18 | vs. Boston University* | Boston Arena • Boston, Massachusetts | L 0–3 | 1–1–0 |
| January 2 | vs. McGill* | Madison Square Garden • Manhattan, New York | L 4–5 ^{3OT} | 1–2–0 |
| January 6 | Toronto* | Boston Arena • Boston, Massachusetts | L 0–2 | 1–3–0 |
| January 9 | at Princeton | Hobey Baker Memorial Rink • Princeton, New Jersey | W 4–3 ^{2OT} | 2–3–0 (1–0–0) |
| January 20 | Williams* | Boston Arena • Boston, Massachusetts | W 4–1 | 3–3–0 |
| January 30 | Princeton | Boston Arena • Boston, Massachusetts | W 4–3 | 4–3–0 (2–0–0) |
| February 3 | Hamilton* | Boston Arena • Boston, Massachusetts | W 11–1 | 5–3–0 |
| February 13 | Yale | Boston Arena • Boston, Massachusetts (Rivalry) | W 4–0 | 6–3–0 (3–0–0) |
| February 20 | Dartmouth* | Boston Arena • Boston, Massachusetts | W 3–2 ^{OT} | 7–3–0 |
| February 27 | vs. Yale | Madison Square Garden • Manhattan, New York (Rivalry) | W 2–0 | 8–3–0 (4–0–0) |
*Non-conference game.
