= 1925–26 Clarkson Golden Knights men's ice hockey season =

Intercollegiate hockey season

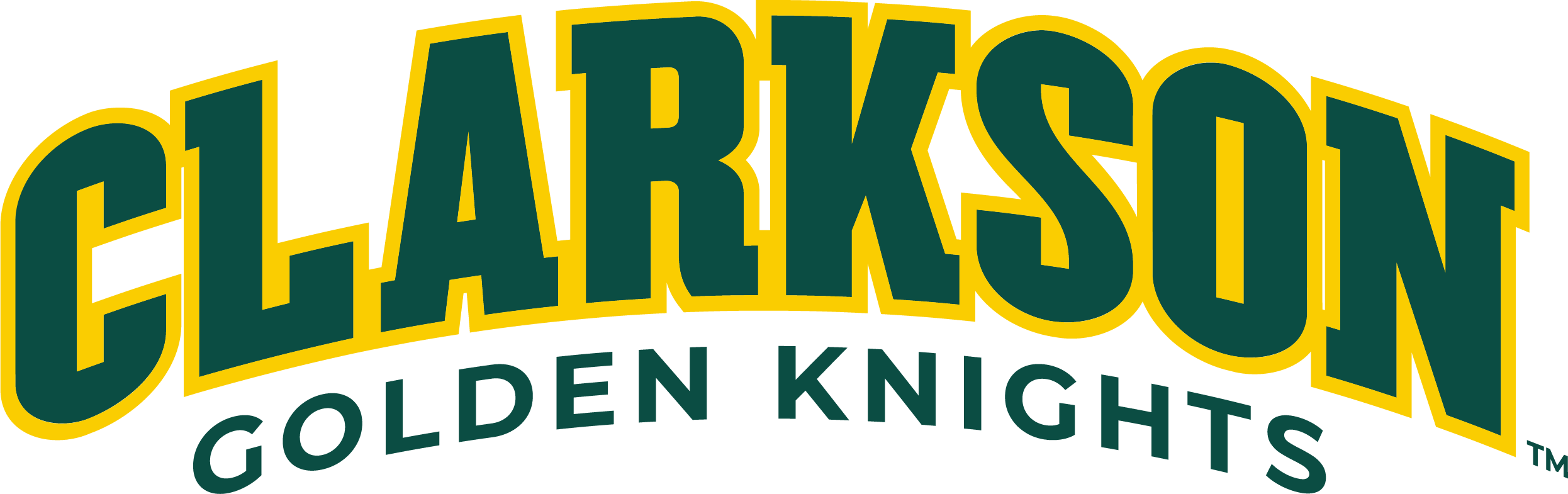
- Home ice: Ives Park

Record
- Overall: 4–4–0
- Home: 2–2–0
- Road: 2–2–0

Coaches and captains
- Head coach: Gordon Croskery
- Captain: Ray Wayland

The 1925–26 Clarkson Golden Knights men's ice hockey season was the 6th season of play for the program. The team was coached by Gordon Croskery in his 3rd season.

== Season ==
After a dismal season the year before, the program had nowhere to go than up. The team lost seven of its nine players to graduation, but that was a blessing in disguise as it allowed professor Croskery to swiftly remake the team. With the temporary on-campus rink not being sufficient, a new venue was built in Ives Park and practice began in earnest immediately after Christmas. 20 men showed up for the start, which was not an inconsiderable number for a school boasting a student body of less than 1,000. The team got in as much practice as they could before heading down to Ithaca for their first match. From the start the team looked much better than it had the year before, skating up and down the ice against Cornell The game was close throughout and Clarkson had a chance to end their losing streak all the way until the end, but ultimately fell 1–2.

The second game for tech would be their first at the new rink and they played host to Syracuse. Sensing a chance for the Knights to win, a large crowd of about 1,000 people showed up to the game. They were witness, however, to a masterful performance by the Orange netminder, Beishline, who turned away every Clarkson shot and allowed his team to win 4–0. Nearly two weeks passed before the third game but the extra practice time seemed to spark the Knights offense. Against the Cornwall Greys, an amateur club from Canada, Clarkson debuted their new goalie, John Klube. The team got down 2–5 after two periods but came storming back in the third. Wayland made a name for himself in the game as the Knights' comeback came up just short but with the team playing much better it was only a matter of time before they finally won a game.

The finally happened against the Winter Park Club from Ogdensburg. Even when they were missing their normal center, Jack Croskery, Tech ended their 10-game losing streak one day shy of the 2-year anniversary of their last win. Warm weather melted the ice for their next game, the first in program history against local college St. Lawrence. The Larries were fielding a varsity team for the first time and Clarkson welcomed them with an ice surface that was little better than a pond. Wayland was again the star for the team in their 1–0 win.

Clarkson ended its 4-game home stand and headed down to play Hamilton, who were having another strong season. The Knights were keen to improve on their 0–9 loss from a year before and did just that, scoring 5 times against the Continentals. Unfortunately, Tech couldn't pull away from Hamilton and ended up losing the match in overtime. Clarkson ended the year with a pair of game, the first a rematch with St. Lawrence on their rink. The change of venue didn't alter the result, however, and Clarkson won the game despite it devolving into a physical contest. The final game came against the Junior Chamber of Commerce team at Watertown and got a strong effort from their opposition. The game was close for the first half of the match, with Watertown twice taking a lead, but Clarkson proved stronger as the game went on and outpaced their opposition in the later half.

The vast improvement of the team over the course of the season, particularly since most of the players would be back next year, signaled good fortune for the Golden Knights in the near future.

== Roster ==
No.	Nat.	Player	Class	Pos	Height	Weight	DoB	Hometown	Previous team
	(Canada)	Jack Croskery	Junior	F/D				Kinburn, Ontario
	(United States)	John Klube	Junior	G				Syracuse, New York
	(United States)	Ernest Longton	Freshman	F				Clayton, New York
	(United States)	Bill Macartney	Junior	D				Fort Covington, New York
		Harold Myrback	Junior	G
	(United States)	Lloyd Northrup	Junior	F				Alexandria Bay, New York
		Ernest Pender	Sophomore
	(United States)	Harold Petrie	Freshman	F				Morristown, New York
	(United States)	Harold Smith	Sophomore	F				Lake George, New York
	(Canada)	Raymond Wayland (C)	Sophomore	D				Montreal, Quebec
		Darwin Wheeler	Freshman	F

== Standings ==
1925–26 Eastern Collegiate ice hockey standings
	Intercollegiate							Overall					
	GP	W	L	T	Pct.	GF	GA	GP	W	L	T	GF	GA
Amherst	7	1	4	2	.286	11	28	7	1	4	2	11	28
Army	8	3	5	0	.375	14	23	9	3	6	0	17	30
Bates	9	3	5	1	.389	18	37	9	3	5	1	18	37
Boston College	3	2	1	0	.667	9	5	15	6	8	1	46	54
Boston University	11	7	4	0	.636	28	11	15	7	8	0	31	28
Bowdoin	6	4	2	0	.667	18	13	7	4	3	0	18	18
Clarkson	5	2	3	0	.400	10	13	8	4	4	0	25	25
Colby	5	0	4	1	.100	9	18	6	1	4	1	–	–
Cornell	6	2	4	0	.333	10	21	6	2	4	0	10	21
Dartmouth	–	–	–	–	–	–	–	15	12	3	0	72	34
Hamilton	–	–	–	–	–	–	–	10	7	3	0	–	–
Harvard	9	8	1	0	.889	34	13	11	8	3	0	38	20
Massachusetts Agricultural	8	3	4	1	.438	10	20	8	3	4	1	10	20
Middlebury	8	5	3	0	.625	19	16	8	5	3	0	19	16
MIT	9	3	6	0	.333	16	32	9	3	6	0	16	32
New Hampshire	3	1	2	0	.333	5	7	7	1	6	0	11	29
Norwich	–	–	–	–	–	–	–	2	1	1	0	–	–
Princeton	8	5	3	0	.625	21	25	16	7	9	0	44	61
Rensselaer	–	–	–	–	–	–	–	6	2	4	0	–	–
Saint Michael's	–	–	–	–	–	–	–	–	–	–	–	–	–
St. Lawrence	2	0	2	0	.000	1	4	2	0	2	0	1	4
Syracuse	6	2	2	2	.500	8	7	7	3	2	2	10	7
Union	6	2	3	1	.417	18	24	6	2	3	1	18	24
Vermont	4	1	3	0	.250	18	11	5	2	3	0	20	11
Williams	15	10	4	1	.700	59	23	18	12	5	1	72	28
Yale	10	1	8	1	.150	9	23	14	4	9	1	25	30

== Schedule and results ==
Date	Opponent	Site	Result	Record
Regular Season
January 9	at Cornell*	Beebe Lake • Ithaca, New York	L 1–2	0–1–0
January 18	Syracuse*	Ives Park • Potsdam, New York	L 0–4	0–2–0
January 30	Cornwall Greys*	Ives Park • Potsdam, New York	L 5–6	0–2–0
February 8	Ogdensburg*	Ives Park • Potsdam, New York	W 4–3	1–3–0
February 13	St. Lawrence*	Ives Park • Potsdam, New York	W 1–0	2–3–0
February 20	at Hamilton*	Russell Sage Rink • Clinton, New York	L 5–6 ^{OT}	2–4–0
February 27	at St. Lawrence*	Weeks Field Rink • Canton, New York	W 3–1	3–4–0
March 1	at Watertown Junior Chamber of Commerce*	Novelty Rink • Watertown, New York	W 6–3	4–4–0
*Non-conference game.
