= 1925–26 Colby Mules men's ice hockey season =

- Conference: Independent
- Home ice: Colby Rink

Record
- Overall: 1–4–1
- Home: 1–1–0
- Road: 0–3–1

Coaches and captains
- Head coach: Eddie Roundy
- Captain: Harry Muir

The 1925–26 Colby Mules men's ice hockey season was the 5th season of play for the program. The Mules represented Colby College and were coached by Eddie Roundy in his 2nd season.

== Season ==
Despite their miserable season in 1925, Colby's ice hockey team continued to receive support from the student body. 40 men shoed up for the first practice, giving coach Roundy the biggest batch of recruits yet. The team began their workout as soon as they returned from the winter break and hoped that weather would not be a consideration this year. The Mules began their season on the road and looked a far sight better than they had a year ago. Though the team looked slow for most of the match, the defense was much better against Bowdoin and broke up many rushes by the Polar Bears. The offense scored more goal in the game than they had all of last season but it still wasn't enough to get a win. The next game was with St. Jean's but neither the score nor the result were reported.

The players returned to their studies for the exam period at the end of the month and didn't return to the ice for over a week. After a rematch with St. Jean's was cancelled, their next game was at New Hampshire. The team went down to defeat at the hands of the Bulls, though they again showed some fight in their game. The team was hoping to translate that effort into win in the rematch with Bowdoin but the weather had other ideas. Constant sunshine softened the home rink and slowed the game to a crawl. The Polar Bears seemed much more able to cope with the adverse conditions and swamped the home team with 4 goals in the second period. Colby tried to fight through the sable-clad opposition but they were wholly unable to stop Bowdoin from claiming the state championship.

Due to the problems with their home rink, the final series with Bates was played on the same day in Lewiston. Both teams were playing for second place and that seemed to light a fire under the Bobcats. Colby seemed completely unprepared for the morning match and surrendered four goals in the first period, however, the Blue and Grey found their skating legs afterwards and gave the home team all they could handle in the final 30 minutes. McGowan caged two goals and Gould one to bring the team within a goal but they could not find the equalizer. The resurgence of the team game them hope for the afternoon session but, once again, Bates drew blood early. The Garnet got out to a 1-goal lead after 15 minutes and put the Mules on the brink. Colby, for the second time that day, played much better in the latter part of the game and tied the match in the third. Both squads scored in the first overtime despite being exhausted. With neither team using alternates, the same twelve men had been skating up and down the ice for 95 minutes already and they looked ready to collapse. However, both teams soldiered on for two more 5-minute sessions before a final 12-minute overtime was instituted. After the final period neither team was able to continue and they agreed to declare the game a draw.

After another poor season that was hindered by the weather, there was a renewed call for the school to switch from ice hockey to basketball, leaving the future of the program in doubt once again. One mark in favor of the team was that it came in under budget. The school had allocated $500 for the program, including the freshman team and cost of equipment, but the program cost less than $400 for the year. In fact, the baseball team had a larger overdraw ($561) than the entire net operating cost of the ice hockey team ($383).

== Roster ==
No.	Nat.	Player	Class	Pos	Height	Weight	DoB	Hometown	Previous team
	(United States)	E. Richard Drummond II	Sophomore	D			1907-09-14	Waterville, Maine
	(United States)	W. Elmer Fagerstrom	Senior	G				Worcester, Massachusetts
	(United States)	Clarence W. Gould	Sophomore	LW			1904-02-23	Ipswich, Massachusetts
	(United States)	John A. McGowan Jr.	Senior	C			1902-04-11	Cambridge, Massachusetts
	(United States)	Harry Muir (C)	Senior	RW				North Vassalboro, Maine
	(United States)	Albert U. Peacock	Junior	D				Providence, Rhode Island

== Standings ==
1925–26 Eastern Collegiate ice hockey standings
	Intercollegiate							Overall					
	GP	W	L	T	Pct.	GF	GA	GP	W	L	T	GF	GA
Amherst	7	1	4	2	.286	11	28	7	1	4	2	11	28
Army	8	3	5	0	.375	14	23	9	3	6	0	17	30
Bates	9	3	5	1	.389	18	37	9	3	5	1	18	37
Boston College	3	2	1	0	.667	9	5	15	6	8	1	46	54
Boston University	11	7	4	0	.636	28	11	15	7	8	0	31	28
Bowdoin	6	4	2	0	.667	18	13	7	4	3	0	18	18
Clarkson	5	2	3	0	.400	10	13	8	4	4	0	25	25
Colby	5	0	4	1	.100	9	18	6	1	4	1	–	–
Cornell	6	2	4	0	.333	10	21	6	2	4	0	10	21
Dartmouth	–	–	–	–	–	–	–	15	12	3	0	72	34
Hamilton	–	–	–	–	–	–	–	10	7	3	0	–	–
Harvard	9	8	1	0	.889	34	13	11	8	3	0	38	20
Massachusetts Agricultural	8	3	4	1	.438	10	20	8	3	4	1	10	20
Middlebury	8	5	3	0	.625	19	16	8	5	3	0	19	16
MIT	9	3	6	0	.333	16	32	9	3	6	0	16	32
New Hampshire	3	1	2	0	.333	5	7	7	1	6	0	11	29
Norwich	–	–	–	–	–	–	–	2	1	1	0	–	–
Princeton	8	5	3	0	.625	21	25	16	7	9	0	44	61
Rensselaer	–	–	–	–	–	–	–	6	2	4	0	–	–
Saint Michael's	–	–	–	–	–	–	–	–	–	–	–	–	–
St. Lawrence	2	0	2	0	.000	1	4	2	0	2	0	1	4
Syracuse	6	2	2	2	.500	8	7	7	3	2	2	10	7
Union	6	2	3	1	.417	18	24	6	2	3	1	18	24
Vermont	4	1	3	0	.250	18	11	5	2	3	0	20	11
Williams	15	10	4	1	.700	59	23	18	12	5	1	72	28
Yale	10	1	8	1	.150	9	23	14	4	9	1	25	30

== Schedule and results ==
Date	Opponent	Site	Result	Record
Regular Season
January 13	at Bowdoin*	Delta Rink • Brunswick, Maine	L 2–3	0–1–0
January 16	St. Jean's Hockey Club*	Colby Rink • Waterville, Maine	W ?	1–1–0
February 6	at New Hampshire*	UNH Ice Rink • Durham, New Hampshire	L 2–4	1–2–0
February 13	Bowdoin*	Colby Rink • Waterville, Maine	L 0–5	1–3–0
February 22	at Bates*	Bartlett Street Rink • Lewiston, Maine	L 3–4	1–4–0
February 22	at Bates*	Bartlett Street Rink • Lewiston, Maine	T 2–2 ^{4OT}	1–4–1
*Non-conference game.
