= 1925–26 Bates Bobcats men's ice hockey season =

Intercollegiate hockey season

- Conference: Independent
- Home ice: Lake Andrews

Record
- Overall: 3–6–1
- Road: 0–4–0
- Neutral: 3–2–1

Coaches and captains
- Head coach: Carleton Wiggin
- Captain: Dave Wyllie

The 1925–26 Bates men's ice hockey season was the 7th season of play for the program.

== Season ==
As the season began, Bates was looking to recover from its worst performance but were not able to get any ice time in until New Year's. While there were many returning players, the team had missed the entire second half of the season due to a lack of ice and improving teamwork was a priority for coach Wiggin. Junie Stanley, who had been elected team captain after last season was no longer enrolled at Bates. The team would have to overcome his loss while Dave Wyllie assumed the mantle of leadership.

The Bobcats' first game came after just 9 days of practice against a veteran team from Bowdoin. The Garnet did their best but they were outmatched by the Polar Bears and sunk 0–3. The score could have been much worse but Wyllie did well in goal as the team was outshot 17–36. Al Lane nearly scored for Bates but the puck entered the net just after the second period had expired. The team then prepared for a 3-game road trip south and met Williams first. The Ephs had already dropped Yale twice and proved their superiority by throttling the Bobcats 0–13. After the worst loss in program history, Bates rebounded against Union. Though they lost the game, their performance was far better and the final score was a respectable 2–4. A day later the team had to contend with poor ice at Army but were still nearly able to pull out a win.

Despite losing all their games to that point, the steady improvement of the team gave hope that they could finish strong and vie for the state championship. They faced a shorthanded Bowdoin club in a rematch a week later but weren't able to take advantage. Wyllie played brilliantly, allowing just 1 goal in the match, but Bates was unable to score at all and lost their chance at a championship. Just before the exam break, Bates played host to New Hampshire and finally ended their losing streak. After losing 10 in a row, dating back to last season, Wyllie posted a shutout to lead the team to victory.

After a 2-week break for exams, Bates returned to the ice in mid-February and took on MIT. The lineup was reshuffled for the game with Lane moved to wing along with White while Foster took over at center. The new forward line provided nearly as much offense as the team had seen all season and popped in 5 goals for the Bobcats. Every score was needed against the Engineers, who netted 4 of their own, but a late goal by Foster gave the team their second win on the season. A third win by Bowdoin ensured the Polar Bears a state championship in the middle of the week but didn't deter the Bobcats from finishing strong. Because an earlier game against Colby had been postponed, the two agreed to play a doubleheader but that too was delayed until the 22nd. The first game Bates got off to a tremendous start by scored four times in the first period with White and Foster each in on two of those goals. The game slowed afterwards and that appeared to suit the Mules as Colby scored twice in the middle period. The pace picked up in the third but that didn't stop the comeback bid and Bates soon had its lead down to just a single goal. Wyllie stood tall in the final minutes, however, and enabled Bates to eke out a win. The second match was much tighter between the two and they finished regulation tied at 1-all. Foster put the team ahead in the first overtime period but it only took a couple of minutes for Colby to tie the game once more. After that the teams, who were visibly tired after an entire day of playing one another, were unable to get another goal. The match went to 4 overtime periods but nothing could be decided. After a total of 72 minutes, the games was called a draw and allowed Bates to claim the runner-up spot for the state championship.

Stanley Stuber served as team manager.

== Roster ==
No.	Nat.	Player	Class	Pos	Height	Weight	DoB	Hometown	Previous team
	(United States)	George H. Chase	Senior				1904-04-26	Cambridge, Massachusetts
	(United States)	Edward I. Erickson	Sophomore	D			1906-12-02	Newburyport, Massachusetts
	(United States)	Lewis F. Foster	Sophomore	D/C			1906-10-14	Belmont, Massachusetts
	(United States)	Fred T. Goggins	Junior					Portland, Maine
	(United States)	Almon G. Lane Jr.	Junior	C/LW			1905-07-12	Lewiston, Maine
		Thomas McCrae Jr.	Sophomore	LW
	(United States)	Lloyd V. Procter	Senior	D			1903-05-03	South Weymouth, Massachusetts
	(United States)	Roy U. Sinclair	Senior	RW			1902-06-03	Westbrook, Maine
	(United States)	Howard S. White	Sophomore	D/RW			1907-04-27	Belmont, Massachusetts
	(United States)	David Wyllie (C)	Senior	G			1904-07-11	Whitneyville, Connecticut

== Standings ==
1925–26 Eastern Collegiate ice hockey standings
	Intercollegiate							Overall					
	GP	W	L	T	Pct.	GF	GA	GP	W	L	T	GF	GA
Amherst	7	1	4	2	.286	11	28	7	1	4	2	11	28
Army	8	3	5	0	.375	14	23	9	3	6	0	17	30
Bates	9	3	5	1	.389	18	37	9	3	5	1	18	37
Boston College	3	2	1	0	.667	9	5	15	6	8	1	46	54
Boston University	11	7	4	0	.636	28	11	15	7	8	0	31	28
Bowdoin	6	4	2	0	.667	18	13	7	4	3	0	18	18
Clarkson	5	2	3	0	.400	10	13	8	4	4	0	25	25
Colby	5	0	4	1	.100	9	18	6	1	4	1	–	–
Cornell	6	2	4	0	.333	10	21	6	2	4	0	10	21
Dartmouth	–	–	–	–	–	–	–	15	12	3	0	72	34
Hamilton	–	–	–	–	–	–	–	10	7	3	0	–	–
Harvard	9	8	1	0	.889	34	13	11	8	3	0	38	20
Massachusetts Agricultural	8	3	4	1	.438	10	20	8	3	4	1	10	20
Middlebury	8	5	3	0	.625	19	16	8	5	3	0	19	16
MIT	9	3	6	0	.333	16	32	9	3	6	0	16	32
New Hampshire	3	1	2	0	.333	5	7	7	1	6	0	11	29
Norwich	–	–	–	–	–	–	–	2	1	1	0	–	–
Princeton	8	5	3	0	.625	21	25	16	7	9	0	44	61
Rensselaer	–	–	–	–	–	–	–	6	2	4	0	–	–
Saint Michael's	–	–	–	–	–	–	–	–	–	–	–	–	–
St. Lawrence	2	0	2	0	.000	1	4	2	0	2	0	1	4
Syracuse	6	2	2	2	.500	8	7	7	3	2	2	10	7
Union	6	2	3	1	.417	18	24	6	2	3	1	18	24
Vermont	4	1	3	0	.250	18	11	5	2	3	0	20	11
Williams	15	10	4	1	.700	59	23	18	12	5	1	72	28
Yale	10	1	8	1	.150	9	23	14	4	9	1	25	30

== Schedule and results ==
Date	Opponent	Site	Result	Record
Regular Season
January 9	vs. Bowdoin*	Bartlett Street Rink • Lewiston, Maine	L 0–3	0–1–0
January 14	at Williams*	Weston Field Rink • Williamstown, Massachusetts	L 0–13	0–2–0
January 15	at Union*	Central Park Rink • Schenectady, New York	L 2–4	0–3–0
January 16	at Army*	Stuart Rink • West Point, New York	L 3–4	0–4–0
January 23	vs. Bowdoin*	Bartlett Street Rink • Lewiston, Maine (Exhibition)	L 0–1	
January 30	vs. New Hampshire*	Bartlett Street Rink • Lewiston, Maine	W 1–0	1–4–0
February 13	vs. MIT*	Bartlett Street Rink • Lewiston, Maine	W 5–4	2–4–0
February 17	at Bowdoin*	Delta Rink • Brunswick, Maine	L 1–4	2–5–0
February 22	vs. Colby*	Bartlett Street Rink • Lewiston, Maine	W 4–3	3–5–0
February 22	vs. Colby*	Bartlett Street Rink • Lewiston, Maine	T 2–2 ^{4OT}	3–5–1
*Non-conference game.
