= 1925–26 Vermont men's ice hockey season =

- Conference: Independent
- Home ice: Kirby's Rink

Record
- Overall: 2–3–0
- Home: 1–2–0
- Road: 0–1–0
- Neutral: 1–0–0

Coaches and captains
- Head coach: E. L. Desautels
- Captain: Walter Denning

The 1925–26 Vermont men's ice hockey season was the inaugural season of play for the program. The team was coached by E. L. Desautels in his 1st season.

== Season ==
While Students at Vermont had been allowed to put a team together in 1924, it was only on an informal basis. The team was shuttered the following year due to a lack of funding but, thanks to pressure exerted by the '24 players, school President Bailey allocated a large sum of money for the team's return and the first official season for the program. The team managed to get access to Kirby's Rink in nearby Winooski and use the venue for its home rink. While the building gave the team a stable home, it did prevent many students from attending the games during the year due to its distance from campus.

The first match was held against a local semi-pro outfit and saw the team post its first win with Herbert scoring the first two goals in program history. Vermont then played Middlebury and Herbert against staked the team to a 2-goal lead. Unfortunately, the Panthers then staged a dramatic comeback and scored three unanswered to hand the Green and Gold their first defeat. The next game came against Union and turned out to be an exciting contest. The Dutchmen got an early lead but Vermont charged back in the second period. Herbert recorded his third consecutive 2-goal game and was joined by Wood in the third to tie the match at 3-all. Early in the first overtime, Wood notched his second marker to give the Greens a lead but Union quickly responded to tie the game once more. The second overtime saw Union gain the edge but Vermont was unable to respond.

The return game with Middlebury did not go as planned and the team was shutout for the first time. The defensive effort from Denning and Winchenbach was solid but the constant attack from the Panthers eventually worse down Vermont. The Greens then took out their frustrations on Saint Michael's and buried the purple team 12–0. Herbert set a program record with 8 goals in the game with Wood and Fitch each adding a pair. The game was so out of hand that coach Desautels was able to use 6 reserve players in the match in order to give them some game experience.

Chester B. Russell served as team manager.

== Roster ==
No.	Nat.	Player	Class	Pos	Height	Weight	DoB	Hometown	Previous team
	(United States)	Walter S. Denning (C)	Freshman	D				Brookline, Massachusetts
	(United States)	Perry M. Fitch	Freshman	F				St. Johnsbury, Vermont
	(United States)	Auxilien C. Gervais Jr.	Junior					Burlington, Vermont
	(United States)	Simeon L. Herbert	Senior	F				Rochester, Vermont
	(United States)	Donald F. Kimball	Senior					Enosburg Falls, Vermont
	(United States)	Edmund R. Mitiguy	Freshman	G				Burlington, Vermont
	(United States)	Francis A. Winchenbach	Sophomore	D				Framingham, Massachusetts
	(United States)	Nelson C. Wood	Freshman	F				Lyndonville, Vermont

== Standings ==
1925–26 Eastern Collegiate ice hockey standings
	Intercollegiate							Overall					
	GP	W	L	T	Pct.	GF	GA	GP	W	L	T	GF	GA
Amherst	7	1	4	2	.286	11	28	7	1	4	2	11	28
Army	8	3	5	0	.375	14	23	9	3	6	0	17	30
Bates	9	3	5	1	.389	18	37	9	3	5	1	18	37
Boston College	3	2	1	0	.667	9	5	15	6	8	1	46	54
Boston University	11	7	4	0	.636	28	11	15	7	8	0	31	28
Bowdoin	6	4	2	0	.667	18	13	7	4	3	0	18	18
Clarkson	5	2	3	0	.400	10	13	8	4	4	0	25	25
Colby	5	0	4	1	.100	9	18	6	1	4	1	–	–
Cornell	6	2	4	0	.333	10	21	6	2	4	0	10	21
Dartmouth	–	–	–	–	–	–	–	15	12	3	0	72	34
Hamilton	–	–	–	–	–	–	–	10	7	3	0	–	–
Harvard	9	8	1	0	.889	34	13	11	8	3	0	38	20
Massachusetts Agricultural	8	3	4	1	.438	10	20	8	3	4	1	10	20
Middlebury	8	5	3	0	.625	19	16	8	5	3	0	19	16
MIT	9	3	6	0	.333	16	32	9	3	6	0	16	32
New Hampshire	3	1	2	0	.333	5	7	7	1	6	0	11	29
Norwich	–	–	–	–	–	–	–	2	1	1	0	–	–
Princeton	8	5	3	0	.625	21	25	16	7	9	0	44	61
Rensselaer	–	–	–	–	–	–	–	6	2	4	0	–	–
Saint Michael's	–	–	–	–	–	–	–	–	–	–	–	–	–
St. Lawrence	2	0	2	0	.000	1	4	2	0	2	0	1	4
Syracuse	6	2	2	2	.500	8	7	7	3	2	2	10	7
Union	6	2	3	1	.417	18	24	6	2	3	1	18	24
Vermont	4	1	3	0	.250	18	11	5	2	3	0	20	11
Williams	15	10	4	1	.700	59	23	18	12	5	1	72	28
Yale	10	1	8	1	.150	9	23	14	4	9	1	25	30

== Schedule and results ==
Date	Opponent	Site	Result	Record
Regular Season
February 13	vs. Winooski Hockey Club*	Kirby's Rink • Winooski, Vermont	W 2–0	1–0–0
February 15	Middlebury*	Kirby's Rink • Winooski, Vermont	L 2–3	1–1–0
February 20	Union*	Kirby's Rink • Winooski, Vermont	L 4–5 ^{2OT}	1–2–0
February 23	at Middlebury*	Middlebury Rink • Middlebury, Vermont	L 0–3	1–3–0
February 24	Saint Michael's*	Kirby's Rink • Winooski, Vermont	W 12–0	2–3–0
*Non-conference game.

== Scoring statistics ==
Name	Position	Games	Goals
Simeon Herbert	F	-	14
Nelson Wood	F	-	4
Perry Fitch	F	-	2
Walter Denning	D	5	0
Francis Winchenbach	D	-	0
Edmund Mitiguy	G	-	0
Total			20
