= 1925–26 Amherst Lord Jeffs men's ice hockey season =

- Conference: Independent
- Home ice: Pratt Field

Record
- Overall: 1–4–2
- Home: 1–1–1
- Road: 0–3–1

Coaches and captains
- Captain: Samuel Cameron

The 1925–26 Amherst Lord Jeffs men's ice hockey season was the 13th season of play for the program.

== Season ==
For the second year in a row, bad weather played havoc with the program. The Jeffmen were unable to get any real practice time entering the season and were forced to cancel their first two games due to a lack of ice. To make matters worse, the team did not have a head coach who could guide the team through the troubled waters and had to rely on team captain Samuel Cameron to hold the group together. By mid-January, the situation was so bleak that the student body took the extraordinary measure of cancelling the entire season. The school's administration responded swiftly and tried to overrule the decision. The two sides came to agreement where the students reversed their motion after both Allison Marsh and Emory Grayson, the head coaches of the soccer and baseball teams respectively, agreed to assist the team for the remainder of the season.

Shortly after the compromise was reached, the weather improved. The team hit the ice as soon as it was ready and got in some training before their match with Massachusetts Agricultural. The game was marred by a distinct lack of teamwork by both sides but the defense help up well, keeping the game as a draw through two overtimes. Amherst played well in their next game, carrying a lead late into the second period. Unfortunately, the lack of practice caught up with the squad and Army used a superior brand of hockey to score three unanswered in the latter portion of the game.

The next match for the Lord Jeffs was supposed to be at Williams, however, a snowstorm forced the game to be postponed to the end of February. Instead, the team welcomed Middlebury and got off to a fast start. The Jeffmen scored three goals at the start of the game to take a sizable lead but weren't able to build on that for the rest of the match. The defense was stout for most of the contest but, similar to the game against Army, they faltered towards the end of the game. In the waning minutes, Middlebury scored twice to cut the lead to one but time ran out before they could complete the comeback.

Amherst took its second trip through New York in the middle of the month, stopping first to take on Union. For the second consecutive game each of the three starting forwards, Patrick, Lawson and Malcolm Cameron, each scored a goal. This time, however, the team could only manage a tie. Due to both teams playing the following night, no overtime was held. The Lord Jeffs then put up a valiant effort against Hamilton, In what was possible their best performance to date, Amherst fell 2–5.

After returning home, the team was met by warm weather once more and were forced to cancel the rematch with Massachusetts Agricultural. They got enough of a reprieve the following week to play Williams twice over the span of five days. At home for the first match, Amherst got the opening goal from Malcolm Cameron. After that, the team was forced to play defense for the remainder of the game. The battle-hardened Ephs were constantly on the attack and only through poor passing and stickhandling did the score remain close. Williams' victory set up a rematch for the Little Three rivals though Amherst may as well have not shown up. The Lord Jeffs were swept off the ice by an obviously superior club, losing 0–11.

Robert O. Anthony served as team manager with Lydon F. Maider as his assistant.

== Roster ==
No.	Nat.	Player	Class	Pos	Height	Weight	DoB	Hometown	Previous team
	(United States)	Malcolm K. Cameron	Sophomore	C			1905-12-30	Greenfield, Massachusetts
	(United States)	Samuel M. Cameron (C)	Senior	D			1904-11-21	Greenfield, Massachusetts
	(United States)	Charles R. Currier Jr.	Sophomore	D			1907-02-19	Jamaica Plain, Massachusetts
	(United States)	Donald W. Evers	Junior	LW				Glenbrook, Connecticut
	(United States)	Geoffrey G. Felt	Freshman	D			1907-02-12	Melrose, Massachusetts
	(United States)	Robert S. Hanford	Sophomore	RW				Rochester, New York
	(United States)	Norman Lawson	Junior	RW				Brooklyn, New York
	(United States)	Curtis S. Miller	Senior	G				Foxborough, Massachusetts
	(United States)	Christopher G. Parnall Jr.	Freshman	D			1909-09-21	Rochester, New York
	(United States)	Rowland V. Patrick	Freshman	LW				West Newton, Massachusetts

== Standings ==
1925–26 Eastern Collegiate ice hockey standings
	Intercollegiate							Overall					
	GP	W	L	T	Pct.	GF	GA	GP	W	L	T	GF	GA
Amherst	7	1	4	2	.286	11	28	7	1	4	2	11	28
Army	8	3	5	0	.375	14	23	9	3	6	0	17	30
Bates	9	3	5	1	.389	18	37	9	3	5	1	18	37
Boston College	3	2	1	0	.667	9	5	15	6	8	1	46	54
Boston University	11	7	4	0	.636	28	11	15	7	8	0	31	28
Bowdoin	6	4	2	0	.667	18	13	7	4	3	0	18	18
Clarkson	5	2	3	0	.400	10	13	8	4	4	0	25	25
Colby	5	0	4	1	.100	9	18	6	1	4	1	–	–
Cornell	6	2	4	0	.333	10	21	6	2	4	0	10	21
Dartmouth	–	–	–	–	–	–	–	15	12	3	0	72	34
Hamilton	–	–	–	–	–	–	–	10	7	3	0	–	–
Harvard	9	8	1	0	.889	34	13	11	8	3	0	38	20
Massachusetts Agricultural	8	3	4	1	.438	10	20	8	3	4	1	10	20
Middlebury	8	5	3	0	.625	19	16	8	5	3	0	19	16
MIT	9	3	6	0	.333	16	32	9	3	6	0	16	32
New Hampshire	3	1	2	0	.333	5	7	7	1	6	0	11	29
Norwich	–	–	–	–	–	–	–	2	1	1	0	–	–
Princeton	8	5	3	0	.625	21	25	16	7	9	0	44	61
Rensselaer	–	–	–	–	–	–	–	6	2	4	0	–	–
Saint Michael's	–	–	–	–	–	–	–	–	–	–	–	–	–
St. Lawrence	2	0	2	0	.000	1	4	2	0	2	0	1	4
Syracuse	6	2	2	2	.500	8	7	7	3	2	2	10	7
Union	6	2	3	1	.417	18	24	6	2	3	1	18	24
Vermont	4	1	3	0	.250	18	11	5	2	3	0	20	11
Williams	15	10	4	1	.700	59	23	18	12	5	1	72	28
Yale	10	1	8	1	.150	9	23	14	4	9	1	25	30

== Schedule and results ==
Date	Opponent	Site	Result	Record
Regular Season
January 26	Massachusetts Agricultural*	Pratt Field Rink • Amherst, Massachusetts	T 0–0 ^{2OT}	0–0–1
February	at Army*	Stuart Rink • West Point, New York	L 2–4	0–1–1
February 8	Middlebury*	Pratt Field Rink • Amherst, Massachusetts	W 3–2	1–1–1
February 12	at Union*	Central Park Rink • Schenectady, New York	T 3–3 ^{†}	1–1–2
February 13	at Hamilton*	Russell Sage Rink • Clinton, New York	L 2–5	1–2–2
February 20	Williams*	Pratt Field Rink • Amherst, Massachusetts	L 1–3	1–3–2
February 24	at Williams*	Sage Hall Rink • Williamstown, Massachusetts	L 0–11	1–4–2
*Non-conference game.

† A contemporary account of the game has the match played without overtime periods. Amherst's yearbook reports the game ending after two overtimes, however, its possible this was confused with the earlier overtime game against Massachusetts Agricultural.
