= 1925–26 Massachusetts Agricultural Aggies men's ice hockey season =

- Conference: Independent
- Home ice: Alumni Field Rink

Record
- Overall: 3–4–1
- Home: 1–2–0
- Road: 2–2–1

Coaches and captains
- Head coach: Lorin Ball
- Captain: Buddy Moberg

The 1925–26 Massachusetts Agricultural Aggies men's ice hockey season was the 18th season of play for the program. The Aggies were coached by Lorin Ball in his 2nd season.

== Season ==
The beginning of the season was a bit of a mixed bag for the Aggies. Coach Ball got a large number of men to show up for tryouts, however, a warm winter left the team unable to practice on ice for large stretches of time. In the meantime, A slate of 12 games was put together and only one of the college hockey powers (Dartmouth) appeared on the schedule. The team had only three returning lettermen: Red Potter, Cary Palmer and team captain Buddy Moberg. Most of the prospective candidates had barely played before and needed as much ice time as possible to get themselves into shape. It wasn't until New Year's that the Aggies were able to get onto the ice and the approximately twenty five students were put through their paces.

When the first game rolled around, the ice on Alumni Field Rink had been damaged by a warm spell that was followed by heavy snowfall. MIT, who were used to using the clean ice at Boston Arena, had less of a problem on the rough ice than the Aggies. The Engineers outskated MAC for most of the match and were able to build a 3–0 lead after two periods. The Aggie defense stiffened in the third but, as they still could not manufacture a goal, the game ended in defeat. The team looked much better in their second match a few days later. They pressed Hamilton, one of the best teams in the nation, hard. After the Continentals opened the scoring late in the first, MAC countered by attacking the Hamilton cage but were unable to score until the third when Forest tied the game. Shortly after Van Vleet gave Hamilton its second lead, the home team subbed in reserves on the forward line. The fresh troops immediately scored three goals to put the game out of reach. The Aggies continued their road trip with a stop in Troy the following night. Despite being tired from the previous game, Moberg's two goals were enough to earn MAC the win as the defense was aided by rough ice. The captain had been shifted to wing while Frese was moved up to center. Abrahamson, who had been one of several right wingers to this point, dropped back to take over the vacated defensive position next to Potter.

The following week, warm weather hit the area and caused the three game trip north to be cancelled. The team was also unable to get much practice in ahead of their meeting with Amherst and the results speak to that problem. Both the Aggies and the Lord Jeffs had trouble working as a team, though both were able to get several individual sallies up the ice. The defenses were able to stand first and end regulation without a single goal being scored. Two 5-minute overtime sessions were played without effect before the game was halted. Both teams were able to play on but the glare from the floodlights off of the ice left the players nearly blinded and both agreed to call the match a draw.

It was nearly two week before the team's next game but the time off seemed to work wonders for the Aggies. MAC played one its best games all season with the forwards acting they were on the same side for a change. While Middlebury scored early in the match, MAC was quick to tie the match. The referee ruled that the puck had entered the cage illegally and waved off the goal, returning the lead to the Panthers. The Aggies outplayed Middlebury in the second but found it impossible to score due to the brilliant performance of the Panther netminder. Forest finally got MAC on the board early in the third but the team was unable to take the lead. two 10-minute overtime periods were agreed to and the Vermont goalie turned aside everything that was sent his way. Middlebury managed to break the tie and held on to escape with a 2–1 win.

In spite of a snowstorm, MAC travelled to face Army for their next game. As they were want to do, the Aggies gave up the first goal but then shut down the Cadet offense for the rest of the match. After Potter tied the game, MAC hemmed Army in its own end for long stretches and Moberg was eventually able to get the winning goal with about 4 minutes to play. Three days later MAC allowed an early goal to New Hampshire but Forest was able to tie the game before the period was finished. Moberg and Frese added to the Aggies' total while the defense stopped the Wildcats from responding. The win put the team at .500 and gave them a chance at a winning season with just two games left.

MAC arrived in Williamstown to face an Ephs squad in the middle of a tremendous season. The Purple skated proved as much with a 0–7 demolition of the visitors that saw the Aggies outplayed in all facets of the game. MAC was able to keep close in the first 20 minutes, however, a 5-goal explosion in the second ended any chance the Maroon players had. Williams deployed reserves in the third but even that couldn't help the Aggies to score. The final game was supposed to be a rematch with Amherst, however, warm weather reared its ugly head once more and the game had to be cancelled.

Donald Williams served as team manager.

== Roster ==
No.	Nat.	Player	Class	Pos	Height	Weight	DoB	Hometown	Previous team
	(United States)	Howard J. Abrahamson	Sophomore	D/RW				Waltham, Massachusetts
	(United States)	Theodore A. Farwell	Junior	LW			1902-12-05	Turners Falls, Massachusetts
	(United States)	Joseph H. Forest	Sophomore	LW			1906-07-06	Arlington, Massachusetts
	(United States)	Paul F. Frese	Sophomore	D/C				Waltham, Massachusetts
	(United States)	Demetrius L. Galanie	Junior	G			1904-09-21	Natick, Massachusetts
	(United States)	Joseph R. Hilyard	Junior	RW				Beverly, Massachusetts
	(United States)	Herbert F. Moberg (C)	Senior	C/RW				Brockton, Massachusetts
	(United States)	Cary D. Palmer	Senior	G				Grafton, Vermont
	(United States)	Royal W. Potter	Senior	D			1901-11-06	Providence, Rhode Island
	(United States)	William T. Stopford	Senior	RW				Newtonville, Massachusetts
	(United States)	Frederick W. Swan	Junior	D/W				Milton, Massachusetts

== Standings ==
1925–26 Eastern Collegiate ice hockey standings
	Intercollegiate							Overall					
	GP	W	L	T	Pct.	GF	GA	GP	W	L	T	GF	GA
Amherst	7	1	4	2	.286	11	28	7	1	4	2	11	28
Army	8	3	5	0	.375	14	23	9	3	6	0	17	30
Bates	9	3	5	1	.389	18	37	9	3	5	1	18	37
Boston College	3	2	1	0	.667	9	5	15	6	8	1	46	54
Boston University	11	7	4	0	.636	28	11	15	7	8	0	31	28
Bowdoin	6	4	2	0	.667	18	13	7	4	3	0	18	18
Clarkson	5	2	3	0	.400	10	13	8	4	4	0	25	25
Colby	5	0	4	1	.100	9	18	6	1	4	1	–	–
Cornell	6	2	4	0	.333	10	21	6	2	4	0	10	21
Dartmouth	–	–	–	–	–	–	–	15	12	3	0	72	34
Hamilton	–	–	–	–	–	–	–	10	7	3	0	–	–
Harvard	9	8	1	0	.889	34	13	11	8	3	0	38	20
Massachusetts Agricultural	8	3	4	1	.438	10	20	8	3	4	1	10	20
Middlebury	8	5	3	0	.625	19	16	8	5	3	0	19	16
MIT	9	3	6	0	.333	16	32	9	3	6	0	16	32
New Hampshire	3	1	2	0	.333	5	7	7	1	6	0	11	29
Norwich	–	–	–	–	–	–	–	2	1	1	0	–	–
Princeton	8	5	3	0	.625	21	25	16	7	9	0	44	61
Rensselaer	–	–	–	–	–	–	–	6	2	4	0	–	–
Saint Michael's	–	–	–	–	–	–	–	–	–	–	–	–	–
St. Lawrence	2	0	2	0	.000	1	4	2	0	2	0	1	4
Syracuse	6	2	2	2	.500	8	7	7	3	2	2	10	7
Union	6	2	3	1	.417	18	24	6	2	3	1	18	24
Vermont	4	1	3	0	.250	18	11	5	2	3	0	20	11
Williams	15	10	4	1	.700	59	23	18	12	5	1	72	28
Yale	10	1	8	1	.150	9	23	14	4	9	1	25	30

== Schedule and results ==
Date	Opponent	Site	Result	Record
Regular Season
January 9	MIT*	Alumni Field Rink • Amherst, Massachusetts	L 0–3	0–1–0
January 15	at Hamilton*	Russell Sage Rink • Clinton, New York	L 2–5	0–2–0
January 16	Rensselaer*	Alumni Field Rink • Amherst, Massachusetts	W 2–1	1–2–0
January 26	at Amherst*	Pratt Field Rink • Amherst, Massachusetts	T 0–0 ^{2OT}	1–2–1
February 6	Middlebury*	Alumni Field Rink • Amherst, Massachusetts	L 1–2 ^{2OT}	1–3–1
February 10	at Army*	Stuart Rink • West Point, New York	W 2–1	2–3–1
February 13	at New Hampshire*	UNH Ice Rink • Durham, New Hampshire	W 3–1	3–3–1
February 16	at Williams*	Sage Hall Rink • Williamstown, Massachusetts	L 0–7	3–4–1
*Non-conference game.

Note: the games against Hamilton and Williams were played with 20-minute periods. All others used 15-minute periods.

== Scoring statistics ==
Name	Position	Games	Goals
Buddy Moberg	C/RW	8	4
Joe Forest	LW	8	4
Red Potter	D	8	1
Paul Frese	D/C	8	1
Ted Farwell	LW	1	0
Demmie Galanie	G	1	0
Joe Hilyard	RW	1	0
Bill Stopford	RW	1	0
Ducky Swan	D/LW/RW	6	0
Howard Abrahamson	D/RW	8	0
Cary Palmer	G	8	0
Total			10
