= 1925–26 United States collegiate men's ice hockey season =

- Duration: December 1925– March 1926
- East Collegiate champion: Harvard
- West Collegiate champion: Minnesota

The 1925–26 United States collegiate men's ice hockey season was the 32nd season of collegiate ice hockey in the United States.

== Regular season ==
=== Standings ===
1925–26 Eastern Collegiate ice hockey standings
	Intercollegiate							Overall					
	GP	W	L	T	Pct.	GF	GA	GP	W	L	T	GF	GA
Amherst	7	1	4	2	.286	11	28	7	1	4	2	11	28
Army	8	3	5	0	.375	14	23	9	3	6	0	17	30
Bates	9	3	5	1	.389	18	37	9	3	5	1	18	37
Boston College	3	2	1	0	.667	9	5	15	6	8	1	46	54
Boston University	11	7	4	0	.636	28	11	15	7	8	0	31	28
Bowdoin	6	4	2	0	.667	18	13	7	4	3	0	18	18
Clarkson	5	2	3	0	.400	10	13	8	4	4	0	25	25
Colby	5	0	4	1	.100	9	18	6	1	4	1	–	–
Cornell	6	2	4	0	.333	10	21	6	2	4	0	10	21
Dartmouth	–	–	–	–	–	–	–	15	12	3	0	72	34
Hamilton	–	–	–	–	–	–	–	10	7	3	0	–	–
Harvard	9	8	1	0	.889	34	13	11	8	3	0	38	20
Massachusetts Agricultural	8	3	4	1	.438	10	20	8	3	4	1	10	20
Middlebury	8	5	3	0	.625	19	16	8	5	3	0	19	16
MIT	9	3	6	0	.333	16	32	9	3	6	0	16	32
New Hampshire	3	1	2	0	.333	5	7	7	1	6	0	11	29
Norwich	–	–	–	–	–	–	–	2	1	1	0	–	–
Princeton	8	5	3	0	.625	21	25	16	7	9	0	44	61
Rensselaer	–	–	–	–	–	–	–	6	2	4	0	–	–
Saint Michael's	–	–	–	–	–	–	–	–	–	–	–	–	–
St. Lawrence	2	0	2	0	.000	1	4	2	0	2	0	1	4
Syracuse	6	2	2	2	.500	8	7	7	3	2	2	10	7
Union	6	2	3	1	.417	18	24	6	2	3	1	18	24
Vermont	4	1	3	0	.250	18	11	5	2	3	0	20	11
Williams	15	10	4	1	.700	59	23	18	12	5	1	72	28
Yale	10	1	8	1	.150	9	23	14	4	9	1	25	30

1925–26 Western Collegiate ice hockey standings
	Intercollegiate							Overall					
	GP	W	L	T	Pct.	GF	GA	GP	W	L	T	GF	GA
Alaska Agricultural	–	–	–	–	–	–	–	4	3	1	0	–	–
Marquette	6	0	5	1	.083	7	27	7	0	6	1	7	33
Michigan	–	–	–	–	–	–	–	10	3	5	2	16	20
Michigan College of Mines	1	0	1	0	.000	1	8	5	2	2	1	10	13
Michigan State	–	–	–	–	–	–	–	4	0	4	0	5	15
Minnesota	–	–	–	–	–	–	–	16	12	0	4	–	–
North Dakota Agricultural	–	–	–	–	–	–	–	–	–	–	–	–	–
Notre Dame	5	2	2	1	.500	14	17	6	3	2	1	17	18
USC	–	–	–	–	–	–	–	–	–	–	–	–	–
Wisconsin	–	–	–	–	–	–	–	15	8	3	4	–	–

1925–26 Minnesota Intercollegiate Athletic Conference ice hockey standings
	Conference							Overall					
	GP	W	L	T	PTS	GF	GA	GP	W	L	T	GF	GA
Augsburg	–	–	–	–	–	–	–	–	–	–	–	–	–
Hamline	–	–	–	–	–	–	–	–	–	–	–	–	–
Macalester	–	–	–	–	–	–	–	–	–	–	–	–	–
St. Thomas	–	–	–	–	–	–	–	11	10	1	0	–	–
No Champion Named

1925–26 Triangular Hockey League standings
	Conference								Overall					
	GP	W	L	T	PTS	SW	GF	GA	GP	W	L	T	GF	GA
Harvard *	4	4	0	0	1.000	2	14	6	11	8	3	0	38	20
Princeton	4	2	2	0	.500	1	12	11	16	7	9	0	44	61
Yale	4	0	4	0	.000	0	3	12	14	4	9	1	25	30
* indicates conference champion
