= Ben Houser =

American baseball player (1883-1952)

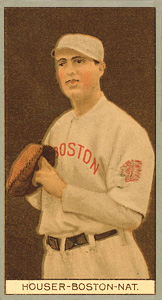
- First baseman
- Born: November 30, 1883; Frackville, Pennsylvania, U.S.
- Died: January 15, 1952 (aged 68); Augusta, Maine, U.S.
- Batted: Left Threw: Left

MLB debut
- May 2, 1910, for the Philadelphia Athletics

Last MLB appearance
- October 5, 1912, for the Boston Braves

MLB statistics
- Batting average: .267
- Home runs: 9
- Runs batted in: 75
- Stats at Baseball Reference

Teams
- Philadelphia Athletics (1910); Boston Rustlers/Braves (1911–1912); Coaching career

Coaching career (HC unless noted)

Baseball
- 1915: Colby
- 1916–1931: Bowdoin

Ice Hockey
- 1924–1931: Bowdoin

Head coaching record
- Overall: 102–141–3 (.421) [baseball]

Benjamin Franklin Houser (November 30, 1883 – January 15, 1952) was an American first baseman in Major League Baseball. He played for the Philadelphia Athletics during the 1910 season, the Boston Rustlers in 1911, and the Boston Braves in 1912. He tied for 8th in home runs in 1912 with 8 while playing for the Boston Braves.

In 162 games over three seasons, Houser posted a .267 batting average (126-for-472) with 58 runs, 9 home runs, 75 RBI and 37 bases on balls. He finished his career with a .989 fielding percentage as a first baseman.

After his playing career, Houser became the head baseball coach at Bowdoin College, remaining in that position for 15 years. During that time he also served as the head coach of the ice hockey team and was a trainer for the football team.

== Head coaching record ==
=== Ice hockey ===
Record table
Season	Team	Overall	Conference	Standing	Postseason
Bowdoin Independent (1924–1930)
1924–25	Bowdoin	2–2–0			State Championship
1925–26	Bowdoin	4–3–0			State Championship
1926–27	Bowdoin	4–4–0			
1927–28	Bowdoin	4–5–0			State Championship
1928–29	Bowdoin	5–4–0			State Championship
1929–30	Bowdoin	2–5–0			
1930–31	Bowdoin	2–6–0			
Bowdoin:		23–29–0			
Total:		23–29–0			
National champion Postseason invitational champion Conference regular season champion Conference regular season and conference tournament champion Division regular season champion Division regular season and conference tournament champion Conference tournament champion
