= 1924–25 Princeton Tigers men's ice hockey season =

College ice hockey season

- Conference: 3rd THL
- Home ice: Hobey Baker Memorial Rink

Record
- Overall: 8–9–0
- Conference: 0–4–0
- Home: 5–5–0
- Road: 3–3–0
- Neutral: 0–1–0

Coaches and captains
- Head coach: Beattie Ramsay
- Captain: Ed Stout

The 1924–25 Princeton Tigers men's ice hockey season was the 25th season of play for the program. The Tigers represented Princeton University and were coached Beattie Ramsay in his 1st season.

== Season ==
=== New coach ===
After two fantastic seasons under Chippy Gaw, Princeton lost its head coach to Boston University due to the Terriers giving him control both its ice hockey and baseball teams. Still hoping to compete with the elite programs, the university brought in Beattie Ramsay to helm the program. Ramsay was a graduate of the University of Toronto and had played four years on the varsity team before winning a gold medal at the 1924 Olympics. Despite his glittering resume as a player, Ramsay had never coached previously but the school was hoping that his experience with hockey in Canada would translate into a higher level of play from the Tigers. However, after watching his teams first practices, Ramsay revealed that there was little difference between Canadian and American styles on the ice. In his estimation, the only difference was the level of experience and training.

After a brief period of practice in early December, the team opened the year with a match against the St. Nicholas Hockey Club. Since the game would not be counted towards a collegiate championship, coach Ramsay decided to use the game more as an exhibition match to see how his team was shaping up. The game began well for the Tigers but the team found it difficult to score on the amateur club. After a scoreless first, however, the Princeton defense gave way and allowed three goals in the second. After two more in the third period, team captain Ed Stout, who had fully recovered from a lacerated arm suffered the year before, scored the Tigers' only goal of the game. A week later, the team was buoyed by the return of Bill Scull in the rematch. This time it was Princeton that was the aggressor on offense with St. Nicks having to respond. Davis led the way with 2 goals while Snyder capped off the night with the winning tally.

=== Christmas trip ===
After disbanding for the holiday, the team embarked on a trip to western New York that would test their mettle. Setting up residence in Buffalo shortly after Christmas, Princeton played six games in eight days. The Tigers opened their hectic week with a game against the Nichols Hockey Club, a local amateur outfit, and began with a resounding 8–4 victory. The following day they crossed the border to face a Canadian junior team from Niagara Falls. In their best match of the trip, Princeton came away with a 6–4 victory. After a day off, the team resumed play with a rematch against Nichols. Despite getting a harder fight from the locals, Princeton was again the victor. The next day the Tigers went back to Niagara Falls for a rematch with the junior club, however, they instead found themselves set against a local senior team. The much more experienced opponents laid into the Tigers, who were beginning to tire by that point, and handed them a 1–6 defeat after a rather lopsided game.

In desperate need of rest, the team had a second day off before returning to Canada to face a city team in Dunnville, Ontario. Princeton got out to an early lead but their exhausted legs could not keep up and the home team took full advantage. After losing 2–5, Princeton ended its stay with a game against Williams. The Ephs opened with two goals on long-range shots and were content to play defense for the remainder of the game. With virtually no strength left, the Tigers had no ability to fight through the defenses and were handed their third consecutive loss. Despite the poor finish, coach Ramsay hoped that the strenuous work would pay dividends later.

=== Scoring woes ===
After the team returned home, they got some much-needed rest before resuming practice. Coach Ramsay focused his attention on improving the team's checking, believing it to be their primary weakness. There was hope that the team had a fighting chance against the defending champions, however, the game very quickly got out of hand. Princeton opened with a flurry that was stopped by the Elis' star goaltender but, after three minutes of play, the Bulldogs took over. Over the next two periods, Yale completely dominated the match and by the time the Tigers put together a rally the score was 0–3 in the third. Davis and Stout did what they could to spark the Tigers but their effort went for naught. A week later, the team hosted Dartmouth and were hoping for a better result. Unfortunately, the Tigers were undone by the speed of the Indians and their losing streak continued. While the team didn't play particularly poorly, the minimal offense came as a result of poor passing. Trenholm was able to end Princeton's scoring drought in the third but that was about the only silver lining to be found in the game.

For their trip up to face Harvard, the Tigers were hoping to end two different streaks. Not only had they lost five in a row but Princeton and not conquered Harvard on the ice since Hobey Baker, losing sixteen of their last eighteen meetings. The Tigers showed a marked improvement over their performance in the previous two games and gave the Crimson a challenge all game. The difference in the game came as a result of two penalties assessed to Princeton at the start of the second period that put the Tigers two men down. Harvard scored on the power play and then twice more in rapid succession immediately afterwards. Princeton was able to close ranks after the barrage but the damage had already been done.

=== Return to form ===
The team was then supposed to take a few weeks off before returning after the exam break, however, Briarcliff Lodge was added to the schedule on short notice a few days later. Against the aggregate made mostly out of former college players, Princeton was finally able to breathe life back into their offense and scored 6 goals on the visitors. Originally, the team was supposed to take a trip up to Quebec and play two games in Montreal. When those plans fell though, an arrangement was made with Briarcliff that included a trip up to New York for a pair of return games just after the break. However, the visit was cancelled when the Lodge could not find accommodations for the Tigers. Instead, the team took a jaunt to Atlantic City for a short break before resuming their season.

With all of their remaining games at home, the Tigers first welcomed Army to New Jersey but had a bit of trouble shaking the rust off. The teams exchanged goals early in the game but the play was interrupted on several occasions due to rough play. No further scoring was made until just 10 minutes remained but that was when the Tigers recovered their strength. Stout began a 4-goal rally from the home team, ending the game with one of their best performances of the season. A few days later the team was able to take advantage of a Cornell squad that had hardly been able to practice. Pepper, who was now the leading man in goal, held the Big Red off of the scoresheet for most of the game and allowed the Tigers to build a considerable lead. The top line of Davis, Scull and Stout all scored in the rout and gave the fans hope for their upcoming rematches.

=== Conference losses ===
For the second time that season, Princeton faced Yale at home. Hoping to improve on the drubbing that had received earlier, Princeton got off to a fast start but, once again, they could not solve the Yale netminder. Pepper equaled the Eli goalie in the first but he was eventually beaten off of a rebound in the second. Yale doubled their lead with another rebound goal at the start of the third and prompted the Tigers to press their attack. However, none of their chances were able to find the back of the net and the Tigers hopes for a championship would have to wait for another year. After a win over Hamilton a few days later, Princeton wrapped up its season against Harvard. With only pride left to play for, the Tigers exhibited one of their finest games all season. After the Crimson opened the scoring, Princeton's offense came alive with Scull and Davis scoring to give the Tigers a lead. Pepper was responsible for preventing many more goals against in the first thanks to timely saves. After Harvard evened the count early in the second, Scull's second of the game regained the lead for the home team. He then finished off a hat-trick at the start of the third and made it appear that the two would need a third meeting to settle the season series. Unfortunately, during a battle for the puck next to the Princeton cage, Wilkinson inadvertently shot the rubber into his own net. The own-goal proved to be the spark that lit the Crimson comeback and the visitors scored twice more before the final buzzer to take the game and end Princeton's season.

Due to their home rink burning down, Princeton offered to make the Hobey Baker Memorial Rink available for Yale while they waited for temporary accommodations to be built early in the season. The Elis accepted and were very appreciative of the gesture.

Frederick B. Manchee served as team manager.

== Roster ==
No.	Nat.	Player	Class	Pos	Height	Weight	DoB	Hometown	Previous team
	(United States)	Robert H. Casey	Sophomore	RW			1904-05-14	Utica, New York
	(United States)	Mulfred A. Colebrook	Junior	G				Rochester, New York
	(United States)	Charles E. Davis Jr.	Senior	C				Albany, New York
	(United States)	Cornelius H. DeLamater Jr.	Sophomore	C			1903-09-03	Manhattan, New York
	(United States)	Gerard Hallock III	Junior	LW/RW			1905-06-14	Pottstown, Pennsylvania
	(United States)	Richard H. Means	Junior	D			1904-04-19	Buffalo, New York
	(United States)	Benjamin F. Pepper	Sophomore	G				Philadelphia, Pennsylvania
	(United States)	John R. Pitman Jr.	Sophomore	C				Orange, New Jersey
	(United States)	Theodore H. Price Jr.	Sophomore	RW				New York, New York
	(United States)	William S. Scull II	Senior	D/RW				Bryn Mawr, Pennsylvania
	(United States)	Robert M. Snyder	Senior	RW				Summit, New Jersey
	(United States)	Edmund C. Stout Jr. (C)	Senior	LW			1902-11-04	South Orange, New Jersey
	(United States)	Henry W. Taylor	Sophomore	D			1904-10-04	Plainfield, New Jersey
	(United States)	George T. Trenholm	Junior	D			1902-11-11	Saint Paul, Minnesota
	(United States)	Burton F. Wilkinson	Junior	D/W			1905-05-11	Buffalo, New York

== Standings ==
1924–25 Eastern Collegiate ice hockey standings
	Intercollegiate							Overall					
	GP	W	L	T	Pct.	GF	GA	GP	W	L	T	GF	GA
Amherst	5	2	3	0	.400	11	24	5	2	3	0	11	24
Army	6	3	2	1	.583	16	12	7	3	3	1	16	17
Bates	7	1	6	0	.143	12	27	8	1	7	0	13	33
Boston College	2	1	1	0	.500	3	1	16	8	6	2	40	27
Boston University	11	6	4	1	.591	30	24	12	7	4	1	34	25
Bowdoin	3	2	1	0	.667	10	7	4	2	2	0	12	13
Clarkson	4	0	4	0	.000	2	31	6	0	6	0	9	46
Colby	3	0	3	0	.000	0	16	4	0	4	0	1	20
Cornell	5	1	4	0	.200	7	23	5	1	4	0	7	23
Dartmouth	–	–	–	–	–	–	–	8	4	3	1	28	12
Hamilton	–	–	–	–	–	–	–	12	8	3	1	60	21
Harvard	10	8	2	0	.800	38	20	12	8	4	0	44	34
Massachusetts Agricultural	7	2	5	0	.286	13	38	7	2	5	0	13	38
Middlebury	2	1	1	0	.500	1	8	2	1	1	0	1	8
MIT	8	2	4	2	.375	15	28	9	2	5	2	17	32
New Hampshire	3	2	1	0	.667	8	6	4	2	2	0	9	11
Princeton	9	3	6	0	.333	27	24	17	8	9	0	59	54
Rensselaer	4	2	2	0	.500	19	7	4	2	2	0	19	7
Syracuse	1	1	0	0	1.000	3	1	4	1	3	0	6	13
Union	4	1	3	0	.250	8	22	4	1	3	0	8	22
Williams	7	3	4	0	.429	26	17	8	4	4	0	33	19
Yale	13	11	1	1	.885	46	12	16	14	1	1	57	16

1924–25 Triangular Hockey League standings
	Conference								Overall					
	GP	W	L	T	PTS	SW	GF	GA	GP	W	L	T	GF	GA
Yale *	5	4	1	0	.800	2	13	5	16	14	1	1	57	16
Harvard	5	3	2	0	.600	1	14	12	12	8	4	0	44	34
Princeton	4	0	4	0	.000	0	6	16	17	8	9	0	59	54
* indicates conference champion

== Schedule and results ==
Date	Opponent	Site	Result	Record
Regular Season
December 12	St. Nicholas Hockey Club*	Hobey Baker Memorial Rink • Princeton, New Jersey	L 1–5	0–1–0
December 18	St. Nicholas Hockey Club*	Hobey Baker Memorial Rink • Princeton, New Jersey	W 4–3	1–1–0
December 27	at Nichols Hockey Club*	Broadway Auditorium • Buffalo, New York	W 8–4	2–1–0
December 28	at Niagara Juniors*	Niagara Falls, Ontario	W 6–4	3–1–0
December 30	at Nichols Hockey Club*	Nichols School Rink • Buffalo, New York	W 4–2	4–1–0
December 31	at Niagara Seniors*	Niagara Falls, Ontario	L 1–6	4–2–0
January 1	at Dunnville*	Dunnville, Ontario	L 2–5	4–3–0
January 3	vs. Williams*	Nichols School Rink • Buffalo, New York	L 1–2	4–4–0
January 10	Yale	Hobey Baker Memorial Rink • Princeton, New Jersey	L 0–4	4–5–0 (0–1–0)
January 17	Dartmouth*	Hobey Baker Memorial Rink • Princeton, New Jersey	L 1–3	4–6–0
January 24	at Harvard	Boston Arena • Boston, Massachusetts	L 2–4	4–7–0 (0–2–0)
January 27	Briarcliff Lodge*	Hobey Baker Memorial Rink • Princeton, New Jersey	W 6–1	5–7–0
February 14	Army*	Hobey Baker Memorial Rink • Princeton, New Jersey	W 5–1	6–7–0
February 18	Cornell*	Hobey Baker Memorial Rink • Princeton, New Jersey	W 8–2	7–7–0
February 21	Yale	Hobey Baker Memorial Rink • Princeton, New Jersey	L 0–3	7–8–0 (0–3–0)
February 24	Hamilton*	Hobey Baker Memorial Rink • Princeton, New Jersey	W 6–0	8–8–0
February 28	Harvard	Hobey Baker Memorial Rink • Princeton, New Jersey	L 4–5	8–9–0 (0–4–0)
*Non-conference game.

Note: contemporary accounts have the second game with St. Nicholas on December 18. Additionally, the match with the Niagara Seniors took place on December 31 with a different final score than appears in the Princeton archives.
