= 1924–25 Clarkson Golden Knights men's ice hockey season =

Intercollegiate hockey season

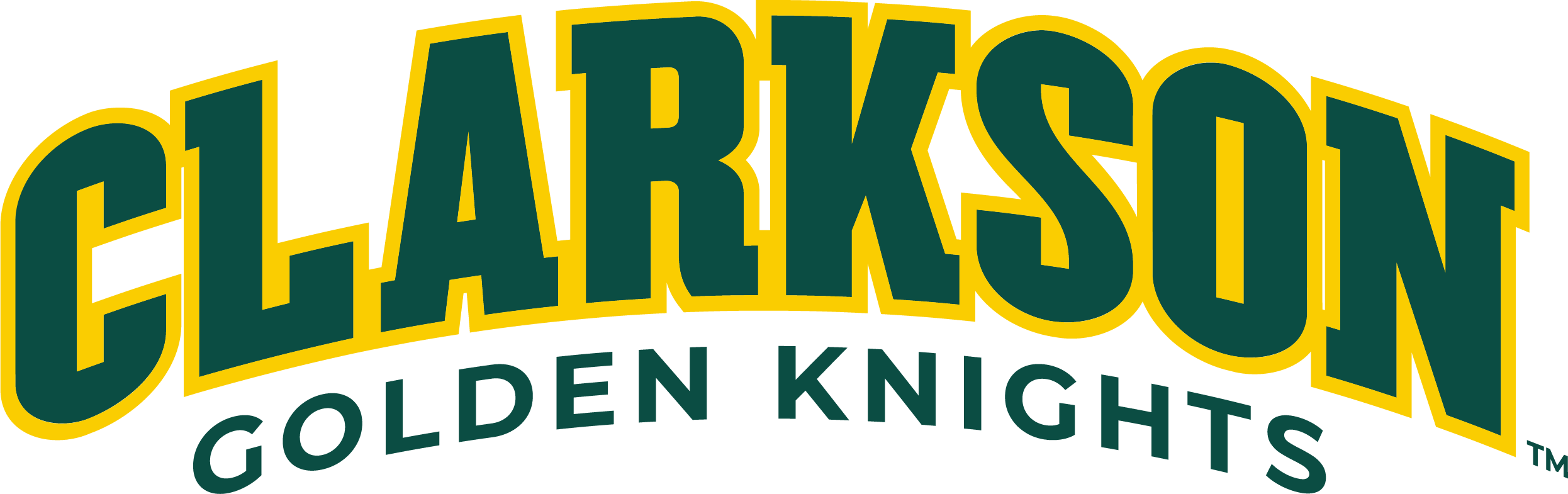
- Home ice: Clarkson Rink

Record
- Overall: 0–6–0
- Home: 0–2–0
- Road: 0–4–0

Coaches and captains
- Head coach: Gordon Croskery
- Captain: Everett Ginn

The 1924–25 Clarkson Golden Knights men's ice hockey season was the 5th season of play for the program. The team was coached by Gordon Croskery in his 2nd season.

== Season ==
There was a good deal of anticipation for the team entering the year, with ice hockey swiftly becoming popular on campus. Unfortunately for Tech, the results on ice could hardly have been worse. The first game against Syracuse happened after only a week of practice, so when the team flagged towards the end of the match there wasn't much concern. The second game against Massena, with Clarkson now playing at home, saw the team pitted against a squad made up mostly of Canadians. Even with a loss, scoring 5 goals showed that the team was at least playing better.

The weather became a factor in the third match. Snowy conditions made it almost impossible to move the puck along the ice so there was little that could be taken from their 2–5 loss. Even with all the excuses, Tech was 0–3 going into a big test in the Capital District. Neither Union nor Rensselaer were expected to be very good. RPI in particular had posted a losing record every year since 1907, and were embarrassed more often than not when playing other college teams. Clarkson arrived in Schenectady looking for their first win and instead they got flattened. Union took the first game 1–5 but it was the drubbing by Rensselaer that was surprising. The Cherry and White used their smaller rink to their advantage and walloped the Golden Knights 1–14.

The team had two weeks off before their final match, travelling downstate to play Hamilton, but the result was predictable. Because of weather conditions, the two ended up playing 4 periods rather than the standard three, but that hardly mattered for the final score. The Continentals were one of the best teams in the country and they proved as much with a 0–9 win, though Clarkson did perform better than they had in January.

Smith led the team in scoring with 4 goals.

== Roster ==
No.	Nat.	Player	Class	Pos	Height	Weight	DoB	Hometown	Previous team
	(United States)	Beverly Bond	Senior	D				Buffalo, New York
	(United States)	Elrick Cowie	Senior	F				Ogdensburg, New York
		James Cuthbert	Senior	F/D
	(United States)	Everett Ginn (C)	Senior	G				Rensselaer Falls, New York
	(United States)	Phillip Josslin	Senior					Mechanicville, New York
	(United States)	Samuel LaFontaine	Senior	F				Champlain, New York
	(United States)	Joseph Mercer	Senior	D				Malone, New York
	(United States)	Lloyd Northrup	Sophomore	F				Alexandria Bay, New York
	(United States)	Harold Smith	Freshman	F				Lake George, New York

== Standings ==
1924–25 Eastern Collegiate ice hockey standings
	Intercollegiate							Overall					
	GP	W	L	T	Pct.	GF	GA	GP	W	L	T	GF	GA
Amherst	5	2	3	0	.400	11	24	5	2	3	0	11	24
Army	6	3	2	1	.583	16	12	7	3	3	1	16	17
Bates	7	1	6	0	.143	12	27	8	1	7	0	13	33
Boston College	2	1	1	0	.500	3	1	16	8	6	2	40	27
Boston University	11	6	4	1	.591	30	24	12	7	4	1	34	25
Bowdoin	3	2	1	0	.667	10	7	4	2	2	0	12	13
Clarkson	4	0	4	0	.000	2	31	6	0	6	0	9	46
Colby	3	0	3	0	.000	0	16	4	0	4	0	1	20
Cornell	5	1	4	0	.200	7	23	5	1	4	0	7	23
Dartmouth	–	–	–	–	–	–	–	8	4	3	1	28	12
Hamilton	–	–	–	–	–	–	–	12	8	3	1	60	21
Harvard	10	8	2	0	.800	38	20	12	8	4	0	44	34
Massachusetts Agricultural	7	2	5	0	.286	13	38	7	2	5	0	13	38
Middlebury	2	1	1	0	.500	1	8	2	1	1	0	1	8
MIT	8	2	4	2	.375	15	28	9	2	5	2	17	32
New Hampshire	3	2	1	0	.667	8	6	4	2	2	0	9	11
Princeton	9	3	6	0	.333	27	24	17	8	9	0	59	54
Rensselaer	4	2	2	0	.500	19	7	4	2	2	0	19	7
Syracuse	1	1	0	0	1.000	3	1	4	1	3	0	6	13
Union	4	1	3	0	.250	8	22	4	1	3	0	8	22
Williams	7	3	4	0	.429	26	17	8	4	4	0	33	19
Yale	13	11	1	1	.885	46	12	16	14	1	1	57	16

== Schedule and results ==
Date	Opponent	Site	Result	Record
Regular season
January 10	at Syracuse*	Syracuse, New York	L 0–3	0–1–0
January 13	Massena H. C.*	Clarkson Rink • Potsdam, New York	L 5–10	0–2–0
January 16	Ogdensburg*	Clarkson Rink • Potsdam, New York	L 2–5	0–3–0
January 23	at Union*	Central Park Rink • Schenectady, New York	L 1–5	0–4–0
January 24	at Rensselaer*	Troy Rink • Troy, New York	L 1–14	0–5–0
February 7	at Hamilton*	Russell Sage Rink • Clinton, New York	L 0–9	0–6–0
*Non-conference game.
