= 1924–25 Harvard Crimson men's ice hockey season =

College ice hockey season

- Conference: 2nd Triangular League
- Home ice: Boston Arena

Record
- Overall: 8–4–0
- Conference: 2–2–0
- Home: 5–1–0
- Road: 1–1–0
- Neutral: 2–2–0

Coaches and captains
- Head coach: Edward Bigelow
- Captain: Edward Beals

The 1924–25 Harvard Crimson men's ice hockey season was the 27th season of play for the program.

== Season ==
With new coach Edward Bigelow behind the bench, Harvard received some impactful news in the offseason. Yale's home building, the New Haven Arena, had burned down, leaving the team without a local venue. This would give Harvard an advantage over the Elis as all games between the two teams would be played at the Boston Arena. Additionally, the team lost only five players to graduation and those spots would be filled by men from an undefeated freshman team.

Harvard got a quick start on the season, defeating MIT 8–3 and Boston University 6–1, before taking on the Boston hockey Club. The 1–8 loss demonstrated that the team still had a ways to go, but the return of Hammond, Howard and Chase from their respective absences would help the team's fortunes.

When Harvard returned from their winter break they found Toronto waiting for them for the fourth consecutive year. This time, however, Harvard was able to put together a winning effort for the first time since 1913. After narrowly losing to another amateur club, Harvard got a leg up on Yale with a 3–2 overtime win, then followed that with a defeat of Princeton the following week. After keeping its intercollegiate record unblemished, Harvard had two chances to defeat its conference rivals and would need them when Yale evened the series with their own 3–2 win.

After keeping their intercollegiate championship hopes alive with a close victory over Dartmouth, Harvard faced Yale in a rubber match that was likely to decide the Triangular League and Intercollegiate championships. The two titans fought a defensive battle with Yale utilizing a similar form of line change as the Crimson. The gambit allowed the Bulldogs' top players to keep up with Harvard long into the night and, after regulation ended without a goal, overtime was required. Neither goaltender surrendered a marker in the two extra periods so a third, sudden-death period was needed. It took six minutes for Yale's Harrison Turnbull to score the only goal of the game and end Harvard's pursuit of a championship.

Harvard won their final game of the season, narrowly defeating Princeton, to finish in second place in the Triangular League.

== Roster ==
No.	Nat.	Player	Class	Pos	Height	Weight	DoB	Hometown	Previous team
		William M. Austin	Senior	LW
		Edward H. Bailey	Sophomore	RW
		Edward M. Beals Jr. (C)	Senior	RW
		Henry M. Bohlen	Senior	D			1902-12-13
		George W. Burgess	Senior	LW
		Philip W. Chase	Senior	D
	(United States)	Thayer Cummings	Junior	G				New York, New York
		John B. Durant	Sophomore	C
		William P. Ellison	Sophomore	D
		Courtland S. Gross	Sophomore	C/LW
		Nathaniel Hamlen	Sophomore	RW
		John W. Hammond	Senior	D	5' 11" (1.8 m)	174 lb (79 kg)
	(United States)	Clark Hodder	Senior	C			1903-11-09	Newton, Massachusetts
		Willard Howard	Sophomore	D
		Nathaniel S. Howe	Junior	C/LW
		John L. Newell	Junior	G
		Charles L. Pierson	Senior	RW
		Laurence O. Pratt	Junior	D			1904-05-07
		Robert L. Pruyn	Sophomore	C			1904-11-05
		William T. Reid	Junior	G
		Richard S. Scott	Sophomore	LW
		Cecil I. Wylde	Sophomore	D
		Isadore Zarakov	Sophomore	RW

== Standings ==
1924–25 Eastern Collegiate ice hockey standings
	Intercollegiate							Overall					
	GP	W	L	T	Pct.	GF	GA	GP	W	L	T	GF	GA
Amherst	5	2	3	0	.400	11	24	5	2	3	0	11	24
Army	6	3	2	1	.583	16	12	7	3	3	1	16	17
Bates	7	1	6	0	.143	12	27	8	1	7	0	13	33
Boston College	2	1	1	0	.500	3	1	16	8	6	2	40	27
Boston University	11	6	4	1	.591	30	24	12	7	4	1	34	25
Bowdoin	3	2	1	0	.667	10	7	4	2	2	0	12	13
Clarkson	4	0	4	0	.000	2	31	6	0	6	0	9	46
Colby	3	0	3	0	.000	0	16	4	0	4	0	1	20
Cornell	5	1	4	0	.200	7	23	5	1	4	0	7	23
Dartmouth	–	–	–	–	–	–	–	8	4	3	1	28	12
Hamilton	–	–	–	–	–	–	–	12	8	3	1	60	21
Harvard	10	8	2	0	.800	38	20	12	8	4	0	44	34
Massachusetts Agricultural	7	2	5	0	.286	13	38	7	2	5	0	13	38
Middlebury	2	1	1	0	.500	1	8	2	1	1	0	1	8
MIT	8	2	4	2	.375	15	28	9	2	5	2	17	32
New Hampshire	3	2	1	0	.667	8	6	4	2	2	0	9	11
Princeton	9	3	6	0	.333	27	24	17	8	9	0	59	54
Rensselaer	4	2	2	0	.500	19	7	4	2	2	0	19	7
Syracuse	1	1	0	0	1.000	3	1	4	1	3	0	6	13
Union	4	1	3	0	.250	8	22	4	1	3	0	8	22
Williams	7	3	4	0	.429	26	17	8	4	4	0	33	19
Yale	13	11	1	1	.885	46	12	16	14	1	1	57	16

1924–25 Triangular Hockey League standings
	Conference								Overall					
	GP	W	L	T	PTS	SW	GF	GA	GP	W	L	T	GF	GA
Yale *	5	4	1	0	.800	2	13	5	16	14	1	1	57	16
Harvard	5	3	2	0	.600	1	14	12	12	8	4	0	44	34
Princeton	4	0	4	0	.000	0	6	16	17	8	9	0	59	54
* indicates conference champion

== Schedule and results ==
Date	Opponent	Site	Result	Record
Regular season
December 11	vs. MIT*	Boston Arena • Boston, Massachusetts	W 8–3	1–0–0
December 16	vs. Boston University*	Boston Arena • Boston, Massachusetts	W 6–1	2–0–0
December 19	vs. Boston Hockey Club*	Boston Arena • Boston, Massachusetts	L 1–8	2–1–0
January 2	Toronto*	Boston Arena • Boston, Massachusetts	W 2–1	3–1–0
January 10	vs. Boston Athletic Association*	Boston Arena • Boston, Massachusetts	L 5–6 ^{OT}	3–2–0
January 17	Yale	Boston Arena • Boston, Massachusetts (Rivalry)	W 3–2 ^{OT}	4–2–0 (1–0–0)
January 24	Princeton	Boston Arena • Boston, Massachusetts	W 4–2	5–2–0 (2–0–0)
February 5	Hamilton*	Boston Arena • Boston, Massachusetts	W 6–2	6–2–0
February 14	Yale	Boston Arena • Boston, Massachusetts (Rivalry)	L 2–3	6–3–0 (2–1–0)
February 21	Dartmouth*	Boston Arena • Boston, Massachusetts	W 2–1	7–3–0
February 25	Yale	Boston Arena • Boston, Massachusetts (Rivalry)	L 0–1 ^{3OT}	7–4–0 (2–2–0)
February 28	Princeton	Hobey Baker Memorial Rink • Princeton, New Jersey	W 5–4	8–4–0 (3–2–0)
*Non-conference game.
