= 1924–25 New Hampshire Bulls men's ice hockey season =

- Conference: Independent

Record
- Overall: 2–2–0
- Road: 2–2–0

Coaches and captains
- Head coach: Hank Swasey
- Captain: Bill Sayward

The 1924–25 New Hampshire Bulls men's ice hockey season was the inaugural season of play for the program. The Bulls represented the University of New Hampshire and were coached by Hank Swasey in his 1st season.

== Season ==
Hank Swasey, an assistant professor of physical education, who was also in charge of the baseball and soccer teams, decided to put the school's first varsity ice hockey team together. A temporary skating rink was built on one of the campus ponds to be used for both student recreation as well as training the ice hockey team. 25 men showed up for the initial practice and enabled the team to start off with a solid foundation. However, due to the small size of the rink and the uncertainty of using a natural surface, few of the team's games were scheduled at home for this season. Practice, too, was hampered by sudden changes in the weather and the team had to cancel several of its practices early in the season. However, since the team did not have its first scheduled game until late January, the new club had plenty of time to get onto the ice and mold themselves into a solid group.

UNH took its first road trip to Maine for a slate of three games on consecutive days. First, the team met Bates on a cold day and acquitted themselves well in the program's first appearance. The game was limited to 10-minute periods due to constant snowfall though even then play was only consistent for the first two minutes. The Bobcats opened the scoring but New Hampshire played well defensively and stopped the home team from building on their lead. Proudman scored the first UNH goal in history in the third and the team held on to force overtime. About three quarters of the way through the extra period, Morton collected the winning goal off of his own rebound. The next day the team met Colby and looked far more comfortable in their own skin. After a slow start, Proudman gave the Bulls the lead after some pretty stickhandling and UNH never looked back. The team racked up five goals on the home team while allowing none. The third meeting pitted New Hampshire against the Association of St. Dominique's in a night game before a crowd of around 5,000. The dim arc lamps made it difficult to see the puck while the team also had to contend with playing its first 60-minute game. Morton opened the scoring but from then on the amateur team took over the match and notched the next five goals. Despite suffering their first loss, UNH returned home having completed a very successful trip.

After a match with MIT was cancelled due to poor ice, the team took a trip south to face Boston University. Prior to the match, Ed Blewett, the starting goaltender, was sent to the hospital after taking a puck to the face in a practice match. He needed several stitches to close the cut but fought through the injury to start the game. After BU opened the match, Wyman tied the game but the bad eye proved too much for the netminder. Three more goals were scored by the Terriers and the period ended with them in command. Red Bartlett subbed in for Blewett at the start of the second and got a big lift from a solid defensive effort by the rest of the team. Once one goal was scored in the rest of the match, again from Boston University, and UNH was handed its second convincing loss.

Originally, BU was supposed to have a return match in Durham at the annual winter carnival, however, an early spring forced all festivities to be cancelled. Eventually the team had to accede to the weather and the rematch was officially abandoned when the temporary rink was dismantled.

== Roster ==
| No. | Nat. | Player | Class | Pos | Height | Weight | DoB | Hometown | Previous team |
|---|---|---|---|---|---|---|---|---|---|
| | (United States) | Francis W. Bartlett | Senior | G | | | | Plymouth, Massachusetts |
| | (United States) | Edward Y. Blewett | Junior | G | | | 1905-03-22 | Braintree, Massachusetts |
| | | Clark | | D |
| | (United States) | Frederic W. Fudge | Junior | D | | | | Stoneham, Massachusetts |
| | (United States) | John O. Morton | Senior | C | | | 1902-07-30 | Concord, New Hampshire |
| | (United States) | William Proudman | Sophomore | RW | | | 1905-02-26 | Freedom, New Hampshire |
| | (United States) | William S. Sayward (C) | Senior | D | | | 1901-04-15 | Cambridge, Massachusetts |
| | | Simpson | | LW |
| | | Warren | | LW |
| | | Eliot Wyman | Sophomore | LW |

== Standings ==
1924–25 Eastern Collegiate ice hockey standings
| | Intercollegiate | | | | | | | Overall | | | | | |
| | GP | W | L | T | Pct. | GF | GA | GP | W | L | T | GF | GA |
|---|---|---|---|---|---|---|---|---|---|---|---|---|---|
| Amherst | 5 | 2 | 3 | 0 | .400 | 11 | 24 | 5 | 2 | 3 | 0 | 11 | 24 |
| Army | 6 | 3 | 2 | 1 | .583 | 16 | 12 | 7 | 3 | 3 | 1 | 16 | 17 |
| Bates | 7 | 1 | 6 | 0 | .143 | 12 | 27 | 8 | 1 | 7 | 0 | 13 | 33 |
| Boston College | 2 | 1 | 1 | 0 | .500 | 3 | 1 | 16 | 8 | 6 | 2 | 40 | 27 |
| Boston University | 11 | 6 | 4 | 1 | .591 | 30 | 24 | 12 | 7 | 4 | 1 | 34 | 25 |
| Bowdoin | 3 | 2 | 1 | 0 | .667 | 10 | 7 | 4 | 2 | 2 | 0 | 12 | 13 |
| Clarkson | 4 | 0 | 4 | 0 | .000 | 2 | 31 | 6 | 0 | 6 | 0 | 9 | 46 |
| Colby | 3 | 0 | 3 | 0 | .000 | 0 | 16 | 4 | 0 | 4 | 0 | 1 | 20 |
| Cornell | 5 | 1 | 4 | 0 | .200 | 7 | 23 | 5 | 1 | 4 | 0 | 7 | 23 |
| Dartmouth | – | – | – | – | – | – | – | 8 | 4 | 3 | 1 | 28 | 12 |
| Hamilton | – | – | – | – | – | – | – | 12 | 8 | 3 | 1 | 60 | 21 |
| Harvard | 10 | 8 | 2 | 0 | .800 | 38 | 20 | 12 | 8 | 4 | 0 | 44 | 34 |
| Massachusetts Agricultural | 7 | 2 | 5 | 0 | .286 | 13 | 38 | 7 | 2 | 5 | 0 | 13 | 38 |
| Middlebury | 2 | 1 | 1 | 0 | .500 | 1 | 8 | 2 | 1 | 1 | 0 | 1 | 8 |
| MIT | 8 | 2 | 4 | 2 | .375 | 15 | 28 | 9 | 2 | 5 | 2 | 17 | 32 |
| New Hampshire | 3 | 2 | 1 | 0 | .667 | 8 | 6 | 4 | 2 | 2 | 0 | 9 | 11 |
| Princeton | 9 | 3 | 6 | 0 | .333 | 27 | 24 | 17 | 8 | 9 | 0 | 59 | 54 |
| Rensselaer | 4 | 2 | 2 | 0 | .500 | 19 | 7 | 4 | 2 | 2 | 0 | 19 | 7 |
| Syracuse | 1 | 1 | 0 | 0 | 1.000 | 3 | 1 | 4 | 1 | 3 | 0 | 6 | 13 |
| Union | 4 | 1 | 3 | 0 | .250 | 8 | 22 | 4 | 1 | 3 | 0 | 8 | 22 |
| Williams | 7 | 3 | 4 | 0 | .429 | 26 | 17 | 8 | 4 | 4 | 0 | 33 | 19 |
| Yale | 13 | 11 | 1 | 1 | .885 | 46 | 12 | 16 | 14 | 1 | 1 | 57 | 16 |

== Schedule and results ==
| Date | Opponent | Site | Result | Record |
Regular Season
| January 20 | at Bates* | Lake Andrews Rink • Lewiston, Maine | W 2–1 ^{OT} | 1–0–0 |
| January 21 | at Colby* | Colby Rink • Waterville, Maine | W 5–0 | 2–0–0 |
| January 22 | at St. Dominique's* | Bartlett Street Rink • Lewiston, Maine | L 1–5 | 2–1–0 |
| February 5 | at Boston University* | Boston Arena • Boston, Massachusetts | L 1–5 | 2–2–0 |
*Non-conference game.

== Scoring statistics ==
| Name | Position | Games | Goals |
|---|---|---|---|
| John Morton | C | 4 | 3 |
| Bill Proudman | RW | 4 | 3 |
| Simpson | LW/RW | 3 | 1 |
| Eliot Wyman | LW | 4 | 1 |
| Fred Fudge | D | 4 | 1 |
| Red Bartlett | G | 1 | 0 |
| Clark | D | 1 | 0 |
| Warren | LW | 1 | 0 |
| Duke Blewett | G | 4 | 0 |
| Bill Sayward | D | 4 | 0 |
| Total | | | 9 |

== Goaltending statistics ==
| Name | Games | Minutes | Wins | Losses | Ties | Goals Against | Saves | Shut Outs | SV % | GAA |
|---|---|---|---|---|---|---|---|---|---|---|
| Duke Blewett | 4 | 160 | 2 | 2 | 0 | 10 | | 1 | | 2.81 |
| Red Bartlett | 1 | 30 | 0 | 0 | 0 | 1 | | 0 | | 1.50 |
| Total | 4 | 190 | 2 | 2 | 0 | 11 | | 1 | | 2.61 |

Note: goals against average is based upon a 45-minute regulation game.
