= 1924–25 Bates Bobcats men's ice hockey season =

Intercollegiate hockey season

- Conference: Independent
- Home ice: Lake Andrews

Record
- Overall: 1–7–0
- Home: 0–2–0
- Road: 1–5–0

Coaches and captains
- Head coach: Carleton Wiggin
- Captain: Ralph Corey

The 1924–25 Bates men's ice hockey season was the 6th season of play for the program.

== Season ==
After Years of icing the best team in the state, Bates entered the season having to remake its lineup. Gone were offensive wizard Joe Cogan and two-way defenseman Dick Stanley, both lost to graduation. In order to fill in those sizable holes, coach Wiggin needed new blood and plenty of practice to get the newly named Bobcats up to snuff. Unfortunately, a new university rule barred freshmen from playing varsity sports during their first semester. This left the team unable to use some of the new students until after the exams in early February. The shorthanded team began their season in early February with a familiar opponent in Bowdoin. Both clubs appeared sluggish in the match and didn't generate many scoring opportunities, however, the Polar Bears were able to defeat Bates for the first time in almost 5 years. The second game saw the Bobcats play much better, however, their opponent was a far tougher match and the team fell to St. Dominique's.

The Bobcats got up off the mat when the headed down to Waterville and took on Colby. Corey and Stanley each scored two goals to led the team to their first win of the year and a renewed hope that the Garnet would be able to reclaim their position as the state champions. The next match was played during a blizzard that slowed the New Hampshire game to a crawl. Snow built up across the ice to such an extent that the puck could hardly be moved. It was a minor miracle that any goals were scored and unfortunate that the majority were caged by the visitors.

Bates then embarked on its annual swing south and did not get the results they were looking for. The Bobcats were trounced by Williams in the first match, will Wyllie surrendering 7 goals to Watkins. Though they were more evenly matched the following night, Bates was still routed by Army, this time only giving up 5 markers. A few nights later, the team looked to have finally pulled itself together and battled the Mass Aggies to an even mark at the end of regulation. Two 10-minute overtime periods failed to elicit any more scoring so a third was employed. This allowed the home team to put up two more markers and hand Bates its sixth defeat of the season. The final game before returning home came against Amherst and the team looked in good shape through two periods, however, playing so many game in such a short time eventually caught up to the Bobcats and they allowed 4 goals in the third to finish their trip by losing every match.

After returning home, the team was getting ready for the intrastate games to begin, unfortunately, an early thaw saw all of the ice rinks in Maine become unsuitable for play. The remainder of the season was cancelled for all colleges and left Bates with its worst record in program history.

Donald Hall served as team manager.

== Roster ==
No.	Nat.	Player	Class	Pos	Height	Weight	DoB	Hometown	Previous team
	(United States)	Ralph L. Corey (C)	Senior	RW			1898-05-10	Springvale, Maine
	(United States)	Albert H. Dimlich	Senior	D			1903-02-10	Andover, Massachusetts
	(United States)	Almon G. Lane Jr.	Sophomore	C			1905-07-12	Lewiston, Maine
	(United States)	John F. O'Connor	Senior	LW			1901-13-01	Dorchester, Massachusetts
	(United States)	Lloyd V. Procter	Junior	D			1903-05-03	South Weymouth, Massachusetts
	(United States)	Roy U. Sinclair	Junior	D			1902-06-03	Westbrook, Maine
		John P. Stanley Jr.	Junior	D
	(United States)	David Wyllie	Junior	G			1904-07-11	Whitneyville, Connecticut

== Standings ==
1924–25 Eastern Collegiate ice hockey standings
	Intercollegiate							Overall					
	GP	W	L	T	Pct.	GF	GA	GP	W	L	T	GF	GA
Amherst	5	2	3	0	.400	11	24	5	2	3	0	11	24
Army	6	3	2	1	.583	16	12	7	3	3	1	16	17
Bates	7	1	6	0	.143	12	27	8	1	7	0	13	33
Boston College	2	1	1	0	.500	3	1	16	8	6	2	40	27
Boston University	11	6	4	1	.591	30	24	12	7	4	1	34	25
Bowdoin	3	2	1	0	.667	10	7	4	2	2	0	12	13
Clarkson	4	0	4	0	.000	2	31	6	0	6	0	9	46
Colby	3	0	3	0	.000	0	16	4	0	4	0	1	20
Cornell	5	1	4	0	.200	7	23	5	1	4	0	7	23
Dartmouth	–	–	–	–	–	–	–	8	4	3	1	28	12
Hamilton	–	–	–	–	–	–	–	12	8	3	1	60	21
Harvard	10	8	2	0	.800	38	20	12	8	4	0	44	34
Massachusetts Agricultural	7	2	5	0	.286	13	38	7	2	5	0	13	38
Middlebury	2	1	1	0	.500	1	8	2	1	1	0	1	8
MIT	8	2	4	2	.375	15	28	9	2	5	2	17	32
New Hampshire	3	2	1	0	.667	8	6	4	2	2	0	9	11
Princeton	9	3	6	0	.333	27	24	17	8	9	0	59	54
Rensselaer	4	2	2	0	.500	19	7	4	2	2	0	19	7
Syracuse	1	1	0	0	1.000	3	1	4	1	3	0	6	13
Union	4	1	3	0	.250	8	22	4	1	3	0	8	22
Williams	7	3	4	0	.429	26	17	8	4	4	0	33	19
Yale	13	11	1	1	.885	46	12	16	14	1	1	57	16

== Schedule and results ==
Date	Opponent	Site	Result	Record
Regular Season
January 10	Bowdoin*	Lake Andrews Rink • Lewiston, Maine	L 1–2	0–1–0
January 14	at St. Dominique's*	Bartlett Street Rink • Lewiston, Maine	L 1–6	0–2–0
January 17	at Colby*	Colby Rink • Waterville, Maine	W 4–0	1–2–0
January 20	New Hampshire*	Lake Andrews Rink • Lewiston, Maine	L 1–2 ^{OT}	1–3–0
January 23	at Williams*	Weston Field Rink • Williamstown, Massachusetts	L 1–8	1–4–0
January 24	at Army*	Stuart Rink • West Point, New York	L 1–5	1–5–0
January 27	at Massachusetts Agricultural*	Alumni Field Rink • Amherst, Massachusetts	L 3–5 ^{3OT}	1–6–0
January 28	at Amherst*	Pratt Field Rink • Amherst, Massachusetts	L 1–5	1–7–0
*Non-conference game.
