= 1924–25 RPI Engineers men's ice hockey season =

- Conference: Independent
- Home ice: RPI Rink

Record
- Overall: 2–2–0
- Home: 2–1–0
- Road: 0–1–0

Coaches and captains
- Head coach: W. J. Cook
- Captain: William Cramp

The 1924–25 RPI Engineers men's ice hockey season was the 22nd season of play for the program. The Engineers represented Rensselaer Polytechnic Institute and were coached b W. J. Cook in his 1st season.

== Season ==
With the team now led by a coach once more, the Engineers opened the season at home against Union. The Cherry and White had a rotating cast at left wing for the game, including former team captain John Reuther, who had returned to the program. However, the scoring was led from the blueline with Farquhar and current captain William Cramp combining for 3 goals. The forward line remained muted in the second game and, unfortunately, the defense could not rescue them a second time. The third game of the season saw a fairly poor Clarkson team getting walloped by the Engineers. While boasting a greater speed than their opponents, RPI also was far more physical than the Golden Knights. The hard play wore down the visitors and Rensselaer was able to seeming score at will in the final period to finish with their biggest win of the season.

After their slate of games in January, poor weather forced the team off of the ice for nearly an entire month. Most of their practices and all of their games were cancelled save for a trip to face Hamilton. With the indoor Russell Sage Rink protected from much of the bad weather, the Engineers were able to end the season in late February. However, by then the team was out of game shape and completely at the mercy of the Continentals, who had been able to practice regularly ahead of the game. The Engineers ended the year with a loss but, even so, it was the first time they had not posted a losing record since 1908.

== Roster ==
No.	Nat.	Player	Class	Pos	Height	Weight	DoB	Hometown	Previous team
		Cliffton W. Bolieau		LW
		Carson		C/LW
		William Cramp (C)		D
	(United States)	William N. Farquhar	Sophomore	D			1904-08-31	Fort Covington, New York
		Gerald Fitzgerald		LW
	(United States)	A. J. Magadini	Freshman	LW			1906-03-19	Great Barrington, Massachusetts
		Quinn		C
		C Reuther		RW
	(United States)	John Reuther		LW				Bridgeport, Connecticut
		Robie		G

== Standings ==
1924–25 Eastern Collegiate ice hockey standings
	Intercollegiate							Overall					
	GP	W	L	T	Pct.	GF	GA	GP	W	L	T	GF	GA
Amherst	5	2	3	0	.400	11	24	5	2	3	0	11	24
Army	6	3	2	1	.583	16	12	7	3	3	1	16	17
Bates	7	1	6	0	.143	12	27	8	1	7	0	13	33
Boston College	2	1	1	0	.500	3	1	16	8	6	2	40	27
Boston University	11	6	4	1	.591	30	24	12	7	4	1	34	25
Bowdoin	3	2	1	0	.667	10	7	4	2	2	0	12	13
Clarkson	4	0	4	0	.000	2	31	6	0	6	0	9	46
Colby	3	0	3	0	.000	0	16	4	0	4	0	1	20
Cornell	5	1	4	0	.200	7	23	5	1	4	0	7	23
Dartmouth	–	–	–	–	–	–	–	8	4	3	1	28	12
Hamilton	–	–	–	–	–	–	–	12	8	3	1	60	21
Harvard	10	8	2	0	.800	38	20	12	8	4	0	44	34
Massachusetts Agricultural	7	2	5	0	.286	13	38	7	2	5	0	13	38
Middlebury	2	1	1	0	.500	1	8	2	1	1	0	1	8
MIT	8	2	4	2	.375	15	28	9	2	5	2	17	32
New Hampshire	3	2	1	0	.667	8	6	4	2	2	0	9	11
Princeton	9	3	6	0	.333	27	24	17	8	9	0	59	54
Rensselaer	4	2	2	0	.500	19	7	4	2	2	0	19	7
Syracuse	1	1	0	0	1.000	3	1	4	1	3	0	6	13
Union	4	1	3	0	.250	8	22	4	1	3	0	8	22
Williams	7	3	4	0	.429	26	17	8	4	4	0	33	19
Yale	13	11	1	1	.885	46	12	16	14	1	1	57	16

== Schedule and results ==
Date	Opponent	Site	Result	Record
Regular Season
January 10	Union*	RPI Rink • Troy, New York	W 4–0	1–0–0
January 17	Middlebury*	RPI Rink • Troy, New York	L 0–1	1–1–0
January 24	Clarkson*	RPI Rink • Troy, New York (Rivalry)	W 14–1	2–1–0
February 21	at Hamilton*	Russell Sage Rink • Clinton, New York	L 1–5	2–2–0
*Non-conference game.
