= 1924–25 Middlebury Panthers men's ice hockey season =

- Conference: Independent
- Home ice: Middlebury Rink

Record
- Overall: 1–1–0
- Road: 1–1–0

Coaches and captains
- Head coach: John Leary
- Captain: John Leary

The 1924–25 Middlebury Panthers men's ice hockey season was the 3rd season of play for the program. The Panthers were led by player/coach by John Leary in his 1st season.

== Season ==
As the season began for Middlebury, the team put together a sizable slate of games. Eleven contests were on the docket and, despite the loss of Erwin Drost as coach, team captain John Leary agreed to fill the role for the year. The Panthers went into the opening game with a handicap as they had yet to have any on-ice practice, and that showed in the result. Hamilton totally dominated the match, at times appearing to score at will. Middlebury showed some life in the third but were unable to breach the Continentals' defenses.

After the match, the team dispersed for the winter break and when they came back they were met with a huge problem. It had turned out to be a warm winter for the entire region. Not only was Middlebury's rink wholly unusable but virtually every outdoor rink in New England was in the same state. Despite the problems, the Panthers were able to play their match with Rensselaer on the 15th. Both teams had little offensive punch and only one goal was cored in the contest. Fortunately, Gonsalves' first career goal turned out to be the winner, giving the program its first ever victory. After the game, the weather got even worse and forced Middlebury to cancel the rest of its season.

Walter D. Gallagher served as team manager.

== Roster ==
No.	Nat.	Player	Class	Pos	Height	Weight	DoB	Hometown	Previous team
	(United States)	John T. Conley	Junior	G				Brockton, Massachusetts
	(United States)	John E. Connolly Jr.	Junior	G				New York, New York
	(Portugal)	John H. Gonsalves	Junior	C/RW			1901-04-09
	(United States)	John J. Leary (C)	Senior	D/C				Boston, Massachusetts
	(United States)	William J. McLaughlin	Junior	D				Dorchester, Massachusetts
	(United States)	Miller F. Naylor	Sophomore	LW			1905-03-15	Somerville, New Jersey
	(United States)	Edward S. Twitchell	Junior	D/RW				New Britain, Connecticut

== Standings ==
1924–25 Eastern Collegiate ice hockey standings
	Intercollegiate							Overall					
	GP	W	L	T	Pct.	GF	GA	GP	W	L	T	GF	GA
Amherst	5	2	3	0	.400	11	24	5	2	3	0	11	24
Army	6	3	2	1	.583	16	12	7	3	3	1	16	17
Bates	7	1	6	0	.143	12	27	8	1	7	0	13	33
Boston College	2	1	1	0	.500	3	1	16	8	6	2	40	27
Boston University	11	6	4	1	.591	30	24	12	7	4	1	34	25
Bowdoin	3	2	1	0	.667	10	7	4	2	2	0	12	13
Clarkson	4	0	4	0	.000	2	31	6	0	6	0	9	46
Colby	3	0	3	0	.000	0	16	4	0	4	0	1	20
Cornell	5	1	4	0	.200	7	23	5	1	4	0	7	23
Dartmouth	–	–	–	–	–	–	–	8	4	3	1	28	12
Hamilton	–	–	–	–	–	–	–	12	8	3	1	60	21
Harvard	10	8	2	0	.800	38	20	12	8	4	0	44	34
Massachusetts Agricultural	7	2	5	0	.286	13	38	7	2	5	0	13	38
Middlebury	2	1	1	0	.500	1	8	2	1	1	0	1	8
MIT	8	2	4	2	.375	15	28	9	2	5	2	17	32
New Hampshire	3	2	1	0	.667	8	6	4	2	2	0	9	11
Princeton	9	3	6	0	.333	27	24	17	8	9	0	59	54
Rensselaer	4	2	2	0	.500	19	7	4	2	2	0	19	7
Syracuse	1	1	0	0	1.000	3	1	4	1	3	0	6	13
Union	4	1	3	0	.250	8	22	4	1	3	0	8	22
Williams	7	3	4	0	.429	26	17	8	4	4	0	33	19
Yale	13	11	1	1	.885	46	12	16	14	1	1	57	16

== Schedule and results ==
Date	Opponent	Site	Decision	Result	Record
Regular Season
December 20	at Hamilton*	Russell Sage Rink • Clinton, New York	Connelly	L 0–8	0–1–0
January 15	at Rensselaer*	RPI Rink • Troy, New York	Connelly	W 1–0	1–1–0
*Non-conference game.

== Scoring statistics ==
Name	Position	Games	Goals
John Gonsalves	C/RW	2	1
John Conley	G	1	0
John Connelly	G	2	0
John Leary	D/C	2	0
William McLaughlin	D	2	0
Miller Naylor	LW	2	0
Ed Twitchell	D/RW	2	0
Total			1
