= 1924–25 Bowdoin Polar Bears men's ice hockey season =

Men's ice hockey

- Conference: Independent
- Home ice: Delta Rink

Record
- Overall: 2–2–0
- Home: 1–0–0
- Road: 1–2–0

Coaches and captains
- Head coach: Ben Houser
- Captain: Howard Preble

The 1924–25 Bowdoin Polar Bears men's ice hockey season was the 6th season of play for the program.

== Season ==
After a difficult season in 1924, the school decided to bring in the first full-time coach for the program and baseball manager, "Smiling" Ben Houser, agreed to take over. Prospects for the season appeared to be good early on as a large number of students showed up to the first practice. With seven lettermen returning, the Bears weren't without experience and all the team needed was decent weather so they could get onto the ice. In the meantime, the program had also proven to be less costly than expected. The team had come in under budget in each of the previous four years with 1924 being the best. On an operating budget of $733.50, the hockey team had only cost $536.01 and returned nearly $200 to the treasurer. The team was not profitable by itself, as $447 of its funds came from the athletic department. Also, the receipts for home games contributed just $30 since students could attend the games for free.

The first game was on January 9 and, thankfully, the team was able to get on-ice practice in beforehand. Cutter and Cronin returned as starting forwards while Preble, who had been elected team captain dropped back to defense to take over for Miguel, last year's captain. Buckham returned to the A-team after finishing out last season with the reserves while Widen and Berry resumed their roles on defense and in goal respectively. While the team was largely unaltered, the changes in style made by Ben Houser turned a solid squad into a defensive force that was able to stand up to perennial state champion Bates. Cutter scored twice against the Garnet who were only able to summon up one score and Bowdoin started the season off with a win for the first time in its history. The team hit the road a few days later and had their pretentions checked by St. Dominique. The defense was far less effective and surrendered 5 goals before any of the forwards could respond. The end of the week saw the Bears finally meet an opponent from Massachusetts when they travelled to face Boston University. Not only was it the first time the team had travelled out of state but it was also the first indoor rink the Polar Bears had ever used. Perhaps awestruck by the sights and sounds or the raucous crowd, Bowdoin was slow off the mark and found themselves down by three less than 10 minutes into the game. The defense tightened up in the middle period but the offense couldn't get anything going against the Terriers. Cutter finally was able to get Bowdoin on the board in the third but a pair of subsequent goals from BU turned the game into a whitewash and the Bears returned home with several issues to address.

After returning home, the team had a week to prepare for their next game and they used the opportunity to great effect. Bowdoin played possibly the best game in program history, looking like a well-oiled machine against Colby and completely dominated their in-state rivals 7–0. Even though they were slowed by poor ice, Cutter (4) and Buckham (3) combined to score every goal in about 18 minutes of game time. Coach Houser put the reserve forwards in for the latter half of the match and, though they failed to score, the Bears' defense made it impossible for the Mules to mount a comeback.

The team suspended play until after the exam break and were set to play MIT upon their return, however, the weather came into play once more. A thaw rendered their rink unusable and the match with the Engineers was cancelled. After terminating a rematch with Colby and postposing two others, the team was preparing itself for the possibility that no further games would be played. In the end, a total lack of ice ended the season for many teams in the region prematurely. Though Bowdoin had played just 4 matched, they were able to win their first state championship by defeating the other two active programs (Maine had suspended operations after last season).

Emlyn Vose served as team manager.

== Roster ==
No.	Nat.	Player	Class	Pos	Height	Weight	DoB	Hometown	Previous team
	(United States)	James Berry	Senior	G			1904-08-19	Harwich, Massachusetts
	(United States)	Frederick W. Browne	Senior	F			1903-01-31	Lawrence, Massachusetts
	(United States)	Gordon Bucknam	Junior	LW/RW			1904-09-15	Newton, Massachusetts
	(United States)	Clarence L. Cole	Sophomore	RW			1905-06-28	Limington, Maine
	(United States)	John W. Cronin	Senior	LW			1905-02-10	Lewiston, Maine
	(United States)	Charles N. Cutter	Junior	C			1904-03-05	Somerville, Massachusetts
	(United States)	William W. Fisher	Junior	LW			1904-06-05	Middletown, Connecticut
	(United States)	Roger H. Littlefield	Junior	D			1903-10-19	Dorchester, Massachusetts
	(United States)	John A. Lord Jr.	Sophomore	F			1904-08-18	Foxboro, Massachusetts
	(United States)	Howard B. Preble (C)	Senior	D			1904-07-10	Everett, Massachusetts
	(United States)	William Widen	Junior	D			1902-12-09	Boston, Massachusetts

== Standings ==
1924–25 Eastern Collegiate ice hockey standings
	Intercollegiate							Overall					
	GP	W	L	T	Pct.	GF	GA	GP	W	L	T	GF	GA
Amherst	5	2	3	0	.400	11	24	5	2	3	0	11	24
Army	6	3	2	1	.583	16	12	7	3	3	1	16	17
Bates	7	1	6	0	.143	12	27	8	1	7	0	13	33
Boston College	2	1	1	0	.500	3	1	16	8	6	2	40	27
Boston University	11	6	4	1	.591	30	24	12	7	4	1	34	25
Bowdoin	3	2	1	0	.667	10	7	4	2	2	0	12	13
Clarkson	4	0	4	0	.000	2	31	6	0	6	0	9	46
Colby	3	0	3	0	.000	0	16	4	0	4	0	1	20
Cornell	5	1	4	0	.200	7	23	5	1	4	0	7	23
Dartmouth	–	–	–	–	–	–	–	8	4	3	1	28	12
Hamilton	–	–	–	–	–	–	–	12	8	3	1	60	21
Harvard	10	8	2	0	.800	38	20	12	8	4	0	44	34
Massachusetts Agricultural	7	2	5	0	.286	13	38	7	2	5	0	13	38
Middlebury	2	1	1	0	.500	1	8	2	1	1	0	1	8
MIT	8	2	4	2	.375	15	28	9	2	5	2	17	32
New Hampshire	3	2	1	0	.667	8	6	4	2	2	0	9	11
Princeton	9	3	6	0	.333	27	24	17	8	9	0	59	54
Rensselaer	4	2	2	0	.500	19	7	4	2	2	0	19	7
Syracuse	1	1	0	0	1.000	3	1	4	1	3	0	6	13
Union	4	1	3	0	.250	8	22	4	1	3	0	8	22
Williams	7	3	4	0	.429	26	17	8	4	4	0	33	19
Yale	13	11	1	1	.885	46	12	16	14	1	1	57	16

== Schedule and results ==
Date	Opponent	Site	Decision	Result	Record
Regular Season
January 10	at Bates*	Lake Andrews Rink • Lewiston, Maine	Berry	W 2–1	1–0–0
January 12	at St. Dominique*	Bartlett Street Rink • Lewiston, Maine	Berry	L 2–6	1–1–0
January 16	at Boston University*	Boston Arena • Boston, Massachusetts	Berry	L 1–6	1–2–0
January 24	Colby*	Delta Rink • Brunswick, Maine	Berry	W 7–0	2–2–0
*Non-conference game.

== Scoring statistics ==
Name	Position	Games	Goals
Charlie Cutter	C	4	8
Gordon Bucknam	LW/RW	4	3
Howard Preble	D	4	1
Fred Browne	F	1	0
John Lord	F	1	0
Roger Littlefield	D	2	0
Bill Fisher	LW	3	0
Jim Berry	G	4	0
Clem Cole	RW	4	0
John Cronin	LW	4	0
Bill Widen	D	4	0
Total			12

== Goaltending statistics ==
Name	Games	Minutes	Wins	Losses	Ties	Goals Against	Saves	Shut Outs	SV %	GAA
Jim Berry	4	171	2	2	0	13		1		3.42
Total	4	171	2	2	0	13		1		3.42

Note: goals against average is based upon a 45-minute regulation game.
