= 1924–25 Syracuse Orangemen ice hockey season =

- Conference: Independent

Record
- Overall: 1–3–0

Coaches and captains
- Head coach: Hugh Keenleyside; Ernest Paul
- Captain: Benjamin Snow

The 1924–25 Syracuse Orangemen ice hockey season was the 4th season of play for the program. The Orangemen represented Syracuse University and were coached by Ernest Paul and Professor Hugh Keenleyside.

== Season ==
For the team's second official season, the players hit the ice as early as possible to get in as much practice as they could before the opening game. This was critical as most of the players had little to no experience with organized hockey. Their efforts appeared to work as the club won its season opener against Clarkson with Snow and Kopkind combining for three goals. Unfortunately, very little went right for the Orangemen afterwards.

After their second match with the Crescent Athletic Club was cancelled, the team was downed by Sedgwick Farms to the tune of 1–3. poor weather conditioned then set in, not only forcing the cancellation of three more matches (all against college opponents), but prevented the team from getting any on-ice practice. Syracuse managed to get in two games towards the end of the season but weren't able to win either.

Bernard Kopkind served as team manager.

== Roster ==
No.	Nat.	Player	Class	Pos	Height	Weight	DoB	Hometown	Previous team
	(United States)	William S. Beishline	Sophomore	G				Buffalo, New York
	(United States)	Russell W. Bill	Sophomore	C				Syracuse, New York
	(United States)	Everett M. Carhart	Senior	RW				Syracuse, New York
	(United States)	Kenneth E. Gray	Sophomore	D				Syracuse, New York
	(United States)	Bernard P. Kopkind	Junior	D			1905-01-03	New Haven, Connecticut
	(United States)	Lawrence E. Reed	Junior	RW				Buffalo, New York
	(United States)	Harger R. Schell	Sophomore	RW			1905-04-18	Syracuse, New York
	(United States)	Robert J. Sherwood	Sophomore	LW				Syracuse, New York
	(United States)	Benjamin A. Snow (C)	Junior	LW			1904-09-18	Cambridge, Massachusetts

== Standings ==
1924–25 Eastern Collegiate ice hockey standings
	Intercollegiate							Overall					
	GP	W	L	T	Pct.	GF	GA	GP	W	L	T	GF	GA
Amherst	5	2	3	0	.400	11	24	5	2	3	0	11	24
Army	6	3	2	1	.583	16	12	7	3	3	1	16	17
Bates	7	1	6	0	.143	12	27	8	1	7	0	13	33
Boston College	2	1	1	0	.500	3	1	16	8	6	2	40	27
Boston University	11	6	4	1	.591	30	24	12	7	4	1	34	25
Bowdoin	3	2	1	0	.667	10	7	4	2	2	0	12	13
Clarkson	4	0	4	0	.000	2	31	6	0	6	0	9	46
Colby	3	0	3	0	.000	0	16	4	0	4	0	1	20
Cornell	5	1	4	0	.200	7	23	5	1	4	0	7	23
Dartmouth	–	–	–	–	–	–	–	8	4	3	1	28	12
Hamilton	–	–	–	–	–	–	–	12	8	3	1	60	21
Harvard	10	8	2	0	.800	38	20	12	8	4	0	44	34
Massachusetts Agricultural	7	2	5	0	.286	13	38	7	2	5	0	13	38
Middlebury	2	1	1	0	.500	1	8	2	1	1	0	1	8
MIT	8	2	4	2	.375	15	28	9	2	5	2	17	32
New Hampshire	3	2	1	0	.667	8	6	4	2	2	0	9	11
Princeton	9	3	6	0	.333	27	24	17	8	9	0	59	54
Rensselaer	4	2	2	0	.500	19	7	4	2	2	0	19	7
Syracuse	1	1	0	0	1.000	3	1	4	1	3	0	6	13
Union	4	1	3	0	.250	8	22	4	1	3	0	8	22
Williams	7	3	4	0	.429	26	17	8	4	4	0	33	19
Yale	13	11	1	1	.885	46	12	16	14	1	1	57	16

== Schedule and results ==
Date	Opponent	Site	Result	Record
Regular Season
January 10	Clarkson*	Syracuse, New York	W 3–1	1–0–0
?	Sedgwick Farms*	?	L 1–3	1–1–0
?	Victoria College*	?	L 1–7	1–2–0
?	at Nichols Hockey Club*	Buffalo, New York	L 1–2	1–3–0
*Non-conference game.
