= 1924–25 Colby Mules men's ice hockey season =

- Conference: Independent
- Home ice: Colby Rink; South End Arena

Record
- Overall: 0–4–0
- Home: 0–3–0
- Road: 0–1–0

Coaches and captains
- Head coach: Eddie Roundy
- Captain: Jack McGowan

The 1924–25 Colby Mules men's ice hockey season was the 4th season of play for the program. The Mules represented Colby College and were coached by Eddie Roundy in his 1st season.

== Season ==
As Colby began its fourth season the program was in a state of limbo. While the team was being led by its fourth different head coach, rather than a professor the program was not headed by a full-time professional. Eddie Roundy was a Waterville native and also head of the football team. However, the school had just recently added basketball as a varsity sport and there was some worry that Colby would be unable to support both programs. Despite the worry, the team put together a slate of 12 games and began practice as soon as the rink was ready.

The season had an inauspicious start when the first game with the Augusta Hockey Club was postponed because the opponent had yet to have a single practice due to poor weather conditions. The persistent warm weather forced Colby to move their game with the St. Jean's Hockey Club to the South End Arena. Fagerstrom performed well in goal but the Mules were outclassed by the visitors. Jack McGowan scored the only Colby goal in the loss. A few days later, the campus rink was in good enough shape for the match with Bates, however, the team was not. Missing Bill Millett, the shorthanded Mules were unable to get any sort of offense going against the Garnet and surrendered the first game of the in-state series to the visitors. The final game in January came at home against a brand new program when New Hampshire arrived in town. Despite their greater experience, the Mules were trampled by the Bulls, and handed their second consecutive shutout.

The team received some good new when Millett returned to the lineup for the match with Bowdoin. Unfortunately, the team had its worst performance of the season. Fagerstrom had a particularly poor game, allowing several easy shots to slip into the goal, but even the 0–7 score did not indicate just how far apart the two teams were. The Polar Bears played without any semblance of teamwork and still dominated the Mules.

Colby was hoping that they could return with a better effort after the exam break, however, the weather got even worse and rendered virtually all of the rinks in the area unusable. The team held out hope until the end of the month but they were eventually forced to bow to reality. The remainder of their schedule was abandoned after just 4 games.

Roy Bither served as team manager.

== Roster ==
No.	Nat.	Player	Class	Pos	Height	Weight	DoB	Hometown	Previous team
	(United States)	W. Elmer Fagerstrom	Junior	G				Worcester, Massachusetts
	(United States)	Claes E. Johnson	Sophomore	D			1903-07-13	Norwood, Massachusetts
	(United States)	Carl R. MacPherson	Junior	RW			1904-04-09	Abington, Massachusetts
	(United States)	Louis R. McBay	Senior	D				New Bedford, Massachusetts
	(United States)	John A. McGowan Jr. (C)	Junior	C			1902-04-11	Cambridge, Massachusetts
	(United States)	E. Willis Millett	Senior	D			1901-07-28	Whitman, Massachusetts
	(United States)	Harry Muir	Junior	LW				North Vassalboro, Maine
	(United States)	Albert U. Peacock	Sophomore	D				Providence, Rhode Island

== Standings ==
1924–25 Eastern Collegiate ice hockey standings
	Intercollegiate							Overall					
	GP	W	L	T	Pct.	GF	GA	GP	W	L	T	GF	GA
Amherst	5	2	3	0	.400	11	24	5	2	3	0	11	24
Army	6	3	2	1	.583	16	12	7	3	3	1	16	17
Bates	7	1	6	0	.143	12	27	8	1	7	0	13	33
Boston College	2	1	1	0	.500	3	1	16	8	6	2	40	27
Boston University	11	6	4	1	.591	30	24	12	7	4	1	34	25
Bowdoin	3	2	1	0	.667	10	7	4	2	2	0	12	13
Clarkson	4	0	4	0	.000	2	31	6	0	6	0	9	46
Colby	3	0	3	0	.000	0	16	4	0	4	0	1	20
Cornell	5	1	4	0	.200	7	23	5	1	4	0	7	23
Dartmouth	–	–	–	–	–	–	–	8	4	3	1	28	12
Hamilton	–	–	–	–	–	–	–	12	8	3	1	60	21
Harvard	10	8	2	0	.800	38	20	12	8	4	0	44	34
Massachusetts Agricultural	7	2	5	0	.286	13	38	7	2	5	0	13	38
Middlebury	2	1	1	0	.500	1	8	2	1	1	0	1	8
MIT	8	2	4	2	.375	15	28	9	2	5	2	17	32
New Hampshire	3	2	1	0	.667	8	6	4	2	2	0	9	11
Princeton	9	3	6	0	.333	27	24	17	8	9	0	59	54
Rensselaer	4	2	2	0	.500	19	7	4	2	2	0	19	7
Syracuse	1	1	0	0	1.000	3	1	4	1	3	0	6	13
Union	4	1	3	0	.250	8	22	4	1	3	0	8	22
Williams	7	3	4	0	.429	26	17	8	4	4	0	33	19
Yale	13	11	1	1	.885	46	12	16	14	1	1	57	16

== Schedule and results ==
Date	Opponent	Site	Decision	Result	Record
Regular Season
January 14	St. Jean's Hockey Club*	South End Arena • Waterville, Maine	Fagerstrom	L 1–4	0–1–0
January 17	Bates*	Colby Rink • Waterville, Maine	Fagerstrom	L 0–4	0–2–0
January 21	New Hampshire*	Colby Rink • Waterville, Maine	Fagerstrom	L 0–5	0–3–0
January 24	at Bowdoin*	Delta Rink • Brunswick, Maine	Fagerstrom	L 0–7	0–4–0
*Non-conference game.

== Scoring statistics ==
Name	Position	Games	Goals
Jack McGowan	C	4	1
Louis McBay	D	1	0
Bill Millett	D	2	0
Claes Johnson	D	3	0
Elmer Fagerstrom	G	4	0
Carl MacPherson	LW	4	0
Harry Muir	RW	4	0
Al Peacock	D	4	0
Total			1
