= 1924–25 Union Skating Dutchmen ice hockey season =

- Conference: Independent
- Home ice: Central Park Rink

Record
- Overall: 1–3–0
- Home: 1–0–0
- Road: 0–3–0

Coaches and captains
- Head coach: Henry Gardner
- Captain: Storrs Bishop

The 1924–25 Union Skating Dutchmen ice hockey season was the 12th season of play for the program. The Skating Dutchmen represented Union College and were coached by Henry Gardner in his 1st season.

== Season ==
Seeking to raise the profile of the program, Union brought in a former college star player to lead the team. Henry Gardner was a standout goaltender for Harvard a dozen years earlier and had recorded the only shutout against Princeton during the Hobey Baker years. Gardner had the advantage of experience with his players as well since most of last year's team was returning. The troubles with temporary rink the team had used could have been an issue for the club but the school sought to address the problem with a new arrangement. D. J. Sweeney agreed to build a special rink on the picnic grounds in Schenectady's central park. The rink would be for the exclusive use of the Union hockey team and would be maintained by the park board. The rink would have dimensions of 100' by 200' and be outfitted with floodlights. The daily practices held by coach Gardner had observers expecting the team to continue improving and they were supposedly set up for success with their opening game against Rensselaer.

Union had soundly defeated RPI to end their season last year, however, the Engineers took to the opportunity to exact their revenge and handed the Dutchmen a 0–4 drubbing. While Union didn't play particularly poorly in the match, loose play in the middle frame allowed Rensselaer to notch three goals in rapid succession. Slattery and Mulqueen had several chances to score but were unable to get through the staunch defensive work of the home team. The team had little change to work on their issues as the second game was just few days away. Though the Dutchmen looked better despite the quick turnaround, they still lost the match at Army. Slattery missed the trip due to an illness, which hampered the efforts of the defense, however, Gilmour was able to get the first goal of the season for the team.

After poor weather caused the next game with Williams to be cancelled, the team got some practice time in before their match with Clarkson. In their only home game of the season, Union easily defeated the Golden Knights. The Dutchmen racked up three goals in the first and were then slowed by poor ice for the remainder of the match. After the exam break, the team received some very unwelcome news when Hall, Kerst, Kaiser, Mattern, Slattery and team captain Bishop were all ruled ineligible for the remainder of the year. While some had yet to play in any of the games, the loss of four starters would have a severe impact on their chances at winning. To make matters worse, poor weather continued to plague the program and caused a second cancellation, this time against Amherst. Clfford, who had been out for the first half of the year, was now eligible after the exams and arrived to help the team in its hour of need. He was joined by newcomers Hyland and Walker as well as several others who had failed to make the team during the December tryouts.

Despite their best efforts, the park board was unable to keep the rink in a usable condition on account of the warm weather. Two additional games were cancelled and Union was unable to get any practice time for their new lineup. Due to the total lack of ice, the team tried to cancel its final game but Hamilton would not agree. The Continentals demanded that Union fulfil its contract since Hamilton's rink was still in working order. The Garnet team that arrived in Clinton was short on experience, familiarity and hadn't been on the ice in nearly a month. Hamilton, meanwhile, had an on-campus indoor rink and had access to fresh ice whenever the mood took them. The game, unsurprisingly, was a debacle for Union from start to finish. The defense was completely helpless in front of the blue and buff attack, surrendering 13 goals in one of the worst games in program history.

Frank Long served as team manager with Don Shannon as his assistant.

== Roster ==
No.	Nat.	Player	Class	Pos	Height	Weight	DoB	Hometown	Previous team
		Storrs M. Bishop Jr. (C)	Junior	LW
		Cameron		RW
		Leslie P. Clifford	Sophomore	D
		Finegan		G
		John G. Gilmour	Sophomore	C/LW
		Wells W. Grotta	Junior				1902-04-19
	(United States)	Donald F. Hyland	Freshman	C			1904-12-14	Utica, New York
		Dwinal C. Kerst	Junior	C
	(United States)	Emmett C. Mattern	Junior	G			1903-06-06	Rush, New York
		Bruce A. Mulqueen	Sophomore	D
		Hugh J. Slattery	Junior	D
		Walker		RW

== Standings ==
1924–25 Eastern Collegiate ice hockey standings
	Intercollegiate							Overall					
	GP	W	L	T	Pct.	GF	GA	GP	W	L	T	GF	GA
Amherst	5	2	3	0	.400	11	24	5	2	3	0	11	24
Army	6	3	2	1	.583	16	12	7	3	3	1	16	17
Bates	7	1	6	0	.143	12	27	8	1	7	0	13	33
Boston College	2	1	1	0	.500	3	1	16	8	6	2	40	27
Boston University	11	6	4	1	.591	30	24	12	7	4	1	34	25
Bowdoin	3	2	1	0	.667	10	7	4	2	2	0	12	13
Clarkson	4	0	4	0	.000	2	31	6	0	6	0	9	46
Colby	3	0	3	0	.000	0	16	4	0	4	0	1	20
Cornell	5	1	4	0	.200	7	23	5	1	4	0	7	23
Dartmouth	–	–	–	–	–	–	–	8	4	3	1	28	12
Hamilton	–	–	–	–	–	–	–	12	8	3	1	60	21
Harvard	10	8	2	0	.800	38	20	12	8	4	0	44	34
Massachusetts Agricultural	7	2	5	0	.286	13	38	7	2	5	0	13	38
Middlebury	2	1	1	0	.500	1	8	2	1	1	0	1	8
MIT	8	2	4	2	.375	15	28	9	2	5	2	17	32
New Hampshire	3	2	1	0	.667	8	6	4	2	2	0	9	11
Princeton	9	3	6	0	.333	27	24	17	8	9	0	59	54
Rensselaer	4	2	2	0	.500	19	7	4	2	2	0	19	7
Syracuse	1	1	0	0	1.000	3	1	4	1	3	0	6	13
Union	4	1	3	0	.250	8	22	4	1	3	0	8	22
Williams	7	3	4	0	.429	26	17	8	4	4	0	33	19
Yale	13	11	1	1	.885	46	12	16	14	1	1	57	16

== Schedule and results ==
Date	Opponent	Site	Result	Record
Regular Season
January 10	at Rensselaer*	RPI Rink • Troy, New York (Rivalry)	L 0–4	0–1–0
January 14	at Army*	Stuart Rink • West Point, New York	L 1–4	0–2–0
January 23	Clarkson*	Central Park Rink • Schenectady, New York	W 5–1	1–2–0
March 3	Hamilton*	Russell Sage Rink • Clinton, New York	L 2–13	1–3–0
*Non-conference game.
