= 1924–25 Cornell Big Red men's ice hockey season =

Intercollegiate hockey season

- Home ice: Beebe Lake

Record
- Overall: 1–4–0
- Home: 1–1–0
- Road: 0–2–0
- Neutral: 0–1–0

Coaches and captains
- Head coach: Nick Bawlf
- Captain: Charles Stainton

The 1924–25 Cornell Big Red men's ice hockey season was the 20th season of play for the program. The teams was coached by Nick Bawlf in his 5th season.

== Season ==
The weather wasn't kind at the start of the season, but it was more accommodating than it had been the year before. Cornell was able to get some practice in before Christmas but the team had some unwelcome news at the beginning of their season. Two starters from '24 who were expected to be on the team were ineligible. Burnett and Kidd, key players in Cornell's offense, wouldn't be able to play this season and coach Bawlf would have to scramble to find their replacements. The lake froze well and the first game with Boston University was played on the 10th. The new lineup didn't have enough practice time together and visitors displayed much better cohesion in their 7–2 win.

An increase in practice time followed, and the team responded with a win over MAC the following week. The team's defense was far sturdier and held the Aggies without much of a chance to score for the first two periods. As had happened during the first game, Tilton remained at center for the entire contest while several players were rotated through both wing positions. The team played their next match a week later but were stymied by a stingy MIT squad, managing just 1 goal in a biting wind.

The team went dormant for several weeks during the exam period and their restart was delayed even further when the match against Clarkson was cancelled due to poor ice conditions. The next team was against a familiar opponent in Princeton and there was hope that the Big red could take advantage of a weakened Tiger squad. However, Cornell was hampered by a lack of practice and the team was soundly defeated. Moving Tilton back to defense provided a boon to the blue line, but the team was unable to stop the Princeton offense from seemingly scoring at will. The final game of the year came against Hamilton and the team was held scoreless by their opponents.

== Roster ==
| No. | Nat. | Player | Class | Pos | Height | Weight | DoB | Hometown | Previous team |
|---|---|---|---|---|---|---|---|---|---|
| | (United States) | Richard Aronson | Junior | F/D | | | | Winthrop, Massachusetts |
| | (United States) | Frank R. Benton Jr. | Sophomore | LW/RW | | | | Ithaca, New York |
| | (United States) | Frederick W. Boesche | Sophomore | C/LW | | | | Ithaca, New York |
| | (Canada) | Hugh Breckenridge | Junior | RW | | | | Hamilton, Ontario |
| | (United States) | Henry H. Bubier | Sophomore | LW/RW | | | | Wellesley, Massachusetts |
| | (United States) | Joseph A. Cooke | Sophomore | LW | | | | Buffalo, New York |
| | (United States) | Frank C. Edminster Jr. | Junior | D | | | | Ithaca, New York |
| | (United States) | Albert R. Hatfield Jr. | Sophomore | D | | | | Utica, New York |
| | (United States) | Phillips B. Hoyt | Sophomore | LW/D | | | | Indianapolis, Indiana |
| | (United States) | Charles M. Stainton (C) | Senior | G | | | | Buffalo, New York |
| | (United States) | Benjamin E. Tilton Jr. | Junior | C/D | | | | Washington D. C. |
| | | Rollin H. White Jr. | Junior | D |
| | | Theodore M. Wright | Senior | RW |

== Standings ==
1924–25 Eastern Collegiate ice hockey standings
| | Intercollegiate | | | | | | | Overall | | | | | |
| | GP | W | L | T | Pct. | GF | GA | GP | W | L | T | GF | GA |
|---|---|---|---|---|---|---|---|---|---|---|---|---|---|
| Amherst | 5 | 2 | 3 | 0 | .400 | 11 | 24 | 5 | 2 | 3 | 0 | 11 | 24 |
| Army | 6 | 3 | 2 | 1 | .583 | 16 | 12 | 7 | 3 | 3 | 1 | 16 | 17 |
| Bates | 7 | 1 | 6 | 0 | .143 | 12 | 27 | 8 | 1 | 7 | 0 | 13 | 33 |
| Boston College | 2 | 1 | 1 | 0 | .500 | 3 | 1 | 16 | 8 | 6 | 2 | 40 | 27 |
| Boston University | 11 | 6 | 4 | 1 | .591 | 30 | 24 | 12 | 7 | 4 | 1 | 34 | 25 |
| Bowdoin | 3 | 2 | 1 | 0 | .667 | 10 | 7 | 4 | 2 | 2 | 0 | 12 | 13 |
| Clarkson | 4 | 0 | 4 | 0 | .000 | 2 | 31 | 6 | 0 | 6 | 0 | 9 | 46 |
| Colby | 3 | 0 | 3 | 0 | .000 | 0 | 16 | 4 | 0 | 4 | 0 | 1 | 20 |
| Cornell | 5 | 1 | 4 | 0 | .200 | 7 | 23 | 5 | 1 | 4 | 0 | 7 | 23 |
| Dartmouth | – | – | – | – | – | – | – | 8 | 4 | 3 | 1 | 28 | 12 |
| Hamilton | – | – | – | – | – | – | – | 12 | 8 | 3 | 1 | 60 | 21 |
| Harvard | 10 | 8 | 2 | 0 | .800 | 38 | 20 | 12 | 8 | 4 | 0 | 44 | 34 |
| Massachusetts Agricultural | 7 | 2 | 5 | 0 | .286 | 13 | 38 | 7 | 2 | 5 | 0 | 13 | 38 |
| Middlebury | 2 | 1 | 1 | 0 | .500 | 1 | 8 | 2 | 1 | 1 | 0 | 1 | 8 |
| MIT | 8 | 2 | 4 | 2 | .375 | 15 | 28 | 9 | 2 | 5 | 2 | 17 | 32 |
| New Hampshire | 3 | 2 | 1 | 0 | .667 | 8 | 6 | 4 | 2 | 2 | 0 | 9 | 11 |
| Princeton | 9 | 3 | 6 | 0 | .333 | 27 | 24 | 17 | 8 | 9 | 0 | 59 | 54 |
| Rensselaer | 4 | 2 | 2 | 0 | .500 | 19 | 7 | 4 | 2 | 2 | 0 | 19 | 7 |
| Syracuse | 1 | 1 | 0 | 0 | 1.000 | 3 | 1 | 4 | 1 | 3 | 0 | 6 | 13 |
| Union | 4 | 1 | 3 | 0 | .250 | 8 | 22 | 4 | 1 | 3 | 0 | 8 | 22 |
| Williams | 7 | 3 | 4 | 0 | .429 | 26 | 17 | 8 | 4 | 4 | 0 | 33 | 19 |
| Yale | 13 | 11 | 1 | 1 | .885 | 46 | 12 | 16 | 14 | 1 | 1 | 57 | 16 |

== Schedule and results ==
| Date | Opponent | Site | Result | Record |
Regular season
| January 10 | Boston University* | Beebe Lake • Ithaca, New York | L 2–7 | 0–1–0 |
| January 17 | Massachusetts Agricultural* | Beebe Lake • Ithaca, New York | W 2–1 | 1–1–0 |
| January 24 | vs. MIT* | Cayuga Lake • New York | L 1–2 | 1–2–0 |
| February 18 | at Princeton* | Hobey Baker Memorial Rink • Princeton, New Jersey | L 2–8 | 1–3–0 |
| February 28 | at Hamilton* | Russell Sage Rink • Clinton, New York | L 0–5 | 1–4–0 |
*Non-conference game.

== Scoring Statistics ==
| Name | Position | Games | Goals |
|---|---|---|---|
| Benjamin Tilton | C/D | 5 | 3 |
| Joe Cooke | LW | 2 | 1 |
| Richard Aronson | C/LW/RW/D | 4 | 1 |
| Frank Benton | LW/RW | 4 | 1 |
| Henry Bubier | LW/RW | 5 | 1 |
| Hugh Breckenridge | RW | 1 | 0 |
| Ted Wright | RW | 1 | 0 |
| Rollin White | D | 2 | 0 |
| Fritz Boesche | C/RW | 3 | 0 |
| Phillips Hoyt | LW/D | 4 | 0 |
| Frank Edminster | D | 5 | 0 |
| Albert Hatfield | D | 5 | 0 |
| Charles Stainton | G | 5 | 0 |
| Total | | | 7 |

Note: Assists were not recorded as a statistic.
