= 1924–25 Army Cadets men's ice hockey season =

- Conference: Independent
- Home ice: Stuart Rink

Record
- Overall: 3–3–1
- Home: 3–2–1
- Road: 0–1–0

Coaches and captains
- Head coach: Ray Marchand
- Captain: Henry Westphalinger

The 1924–25 Army Cadets men's ice hockey season was the 22nd season of play for the program. The team was coached by Ray Marchand in his 2nd season.

== Season ==
For Marchand's second season behind the bench, he would have to rebuild a team that lost all three starting forwards and its goaltender. Two reserves from last season (Heidner and Maude) were joined by new entry Thiebaud for the new offensive line while last year's reserve netminder, Lewis, was promoted to the starting role. Unfortunately, Army was again hampered by a lack of ice due to warm weather and had few opportunities to practice throughout the season. Despite the lack of familiarity between the forwards, Army got off to a good start, scoring ten goals in its first three games. The match against MIT was affected by soft ice that bogged down players on both sides.

When Army met Boston University for the first time, both sides spent the first period feeling one another out. BU dominated the second period, scoring four times and making it seem like the game would be a rout. Army recovered in the final frame, however, and fired a barrage of shots at the opposing goaltender. Three managed to find the back of the next but the Cadets were prevented from tying the game by a stellar netminding performance. After a further win over Amherst, virtually all of the Stuart Rink ice melted and the team was unable to practice for two weeks. Things got so bad that Army was forced to play its first ever intercollegiate road game in mid-February, travelling south to take on Princeton.

With the ice missing, all signs were pointing to the rivalry game with the Royal Military College being cancelled. However, just prior to the match a cold wind blew in and Stuart Rink became usable once more. Just as they had over the previous two years, the Paladins proved superior and defeated the Cadets.

== Roster ==
| No. | Nat. | Player | Class | Pos | Height | Weight | DoB | Hometown | Previous team |
|---|---|---|---|---|---|---|---|---|---|
| | (United States) | Willet J. Baird | Senior | D | | | 1902-01-13 | Cornwall-on-Hudson, New York |
| | (United States) | Edmund K. Daley | Freshman | RW/D | | | 1907-07-28 | West Point, New York |
| | (United States) | Alvin A. Heidner | Junior | C | | | 1904-10-14 | North Dakota |
| | (United States) | Mark K. Lewis Jr. | Sophomore | G | | | 1902-10-29 | Maple Shade, New Jersey |
| | (United States) | Joseph Lovejoy Jr. | Freshman | D | | | | Martha's Vineyard, Massachusetts |
| | (United States) | Raymond C. Maude | Junior | LW | | | 1902-07-01 | Framingham, Massachusetts |
| | (United States) | Tito C. Moscatelli | Freshman | RW | | | 1904-09-04 | Cagli, Italy |
| | (United States) | Frederick F. Scheiffler | Junior | LW | | | 1904-04-15 | Alpena, Michigan |
| | (United States) | Kenneth E. Thiebaud | Sophomore | RW | | | 1904-05-08 | Saint Paul, Minnesota |
| | (United States) | Henry R. Westphalinger (C) | Senior | D | | | 1903-03-28 | Saint Paul, Minnesota |
| | (United States) | Robert M. Wohlforth | Sophomore | RW | | | 1904-02-25 | Spring Lake, New Jersey |

== Standings ==
1924–25 Eastern Collegiate ice hockey standings
| | Intercollegiate | | | | | | | Overall | | | | | |
| | GP | W | L | T | Pct. | GF | GA | GP | W | L | T | GF | GA |
|---|---|---|---|---|---|---|---|---|---|---|---|---|---|
| Amherst | 5 | 2 | 3 | 0 | .400 | 11 | 24 | 5 | 2 | 3 | 0 | 11 | 24 |
| Army | 6 | 3 | 2 | 1 | .583 | 16 | 12 | 7 | 3 | 3 | 1 | 16 | 17 |
| Bates | 7 | 1 | 6 | 0 | .143 | 12 | 27 | 8 | 1 | 7 | 0 | 13 | 33 |
| Boston College | 2 | 1 | 1 | 0 | .500 | 3 | 1 | 16 | 8 | 6 | 2 | 40 | 27 |
| Boston University | 11 | 6 | 4 | 1 | .591 | 30 | 24 | 12 | 7 | 4 | 1 | 34 | 25 |
| Bowdoin | 3 | 2 | 1 | 0 | .667 | 10 | 7 | 4 | 2 | 2 | 0 | 12 | 13 |
| Clarkson | 4 | 0 | 4 | 0 | .000 | 2 | 31 | 6 | 0 | 6 | 0 | 9 | 46 |
| Colby | 3 | 0 | 3 | 0 | .000 | 0 | 16 | 4 | 0 | 4 | 0 | 1 | 20 |
| Cornell | 5 | 1 | 4 | 0 | .200 | 7 | 23 | 5 | 1 | 4 | 0 | 7 | 23 |
| Dartmouth | – | – | – | – | – | – | – | 8 | 4 | 3 | 1 | 28 | 12 |
| Hamilton | – | – | – | – | – | – | – | 12 | 8 | 3 | 1 | 60 | 21 |
| Harvard | 10 | 8 | 2 | 0 | .800 | 38 | 20 | 12 | 8 | 4 | 0 | 44 | 34 |
| Massachusetts Agricultural | 7 | 2 | 5 | 0 | .286 | 13 | 38 | 7 | 2 | 5 | 0 | 13 | 38 |
| Middlebury | 2 | 1 | 1 | 0 | .500 | 1 | 8 | 2 | 1 | 1 | 0 | 1 | 8 |
| MIT | 8 | 2 | 4 | 2 | .375 | 15 | 28 | 9 | 2 | 5 | 2 | 17 | 32 |
| New Hampshire | 3 | 2 | 1 | 0 | .667 | 8 | 6 | 4 | 2 | 2 | 0 | 9 | 11 |
| Princeton | 9 | 3 | 6 | 0 | .333 | 27 | 24 | 17 | 8 | 9 | 0 | 59 | 54 |
| Rensselaer | 4 | 2 | 2 | 0 | .500 | 19 | 7 | 4 | 2 | 2 | 0 | 19 | 7 |
| Syracuse | 1 | 1 | 0 | 0 | 1.000 | 3 | 1 | 4 | 1 | 3 | 0 | 6 | 13 |
| Union | 4 | 1 | 3 | 0 | .250 | 8 | 22 | 4 | 1 | 3 | 0 | 8 | 22 |
| Williams | 7 | 3 | 4 | 0 | .429 | 26 | 17 | 8 | 4 | 4 | 0 | 33 | 19 |
| Yale | 13 | 11 | 1 | 1 | .885 | 46 | 12 | 16 | 14 | 1 | 1 | 57 | 16 |

== Schedule and results ==
| Date | Opponent | Site | Result | Record |
Regular Season
| January 14 | Union* | Stuart Rink • West Point, New York | W 4–1 | 1–0–0 |
| January 17 | MIT* | Stuart Rink • West Point, New York | T 1–1 | 1–0–1 |
| January 24 | Bates* | Stuart Rink • West Point, New York | W 5–1 | 2–0–1 |
| January 28 | Boston University* | Stuart Rink • West Point, New York | L 3–4 | 2–1–1 |
| January | Amherst* | Stuart Rink • West Point, New York | W 2–0 | 3–1–1 |
| February 14 | at Princeton* | Hobey Baker Memorial Rink • Princeton, New Jersey | L 1–5 | 3–2–1 |
| February 28 | Royal Military College* | Stuart Rink • West Point, New York | L 0–5 | 3–3–1 |
*Non-conference game.
