= 1924–25 Amherst Lord Jeffs men's ice hockey season =

- Conference: Independent
- Home ice: Pratt Field

Record
- Overall: 2–3–0
- Home: 1–0–0
- Road: 1–3–0

Coaches and captains
- Captain: Crosby Allison

The 1924–25 Amherst Lord Jeffs men's ice hockey season was the 12th season of play for the program.

== Season ==
After one of their best seasons in 1924, Amherst entered the year hoping for more of the same. Unfortunately, poor weather conditions plagues the team throughout the year. The Lord Jeffs were only able to play five of their scheduled nine games with only one at home. Amherst wasn't able to play their season opener until late January and, even then, they were forced to fight through a small blizzard against cross-town rival, Massachusetts Agricultural. Heavy wind and snow made passing very difficult, however, that did not stop Amherst from opening the scoring on a controversial play. In the first period, Norman Lawson was behind the Aggie cage and shot the puck through the netting to Malcom Cameron. Cameron then fired the puck back into the net for the score and, since there was no rule against such a play, the goal was allowed to stand. two second period goals put the Jeffs in the lead for good and they pulled out a narrow victory.

The next night, Amherst played host to Bates and the two were evenly matched for most of the contest. Amherst was able to capitalize on the fatigued squad in the third and Malcom Cameron led the way with 2 goals and 2 assists in the frame. The team took a quick trip to take on Army at the end of the month but their offense was silent for the entire match.

February began with another journey, this time to face Williams. The Lord Jeffs were flattened by the Ephs, completely overwhelmed by the teamwork of the home squad Malcom Cameron scored the only goal for Amherst in the 1–12 drubbing. The Jeffmen then ended their season with a slightly less embarrassing loss to Hamilton.

No coach was employed for this season, however, Frederick H. Tarr served as team manager with Robert O. Anthony as his assistant.

== Roster ==
No.	Nat.	Player	Class	Pos	Height	Weight	DoB	Hometown	Previous team
	(United States)	Crosby Allison (C)	Senior	D				Brooklyn, New York
	(United States)	Robert O. Anthony	Junior	RW			1904-06-22	Hanover, Massachusetts
	(United States)	Malcolm K. Cameron	Freshman	LW/RW			1905-12-30	Greenfield, Massachusetts
	(United States)	Samuel M. Cameron	Junior	LW/RW			1904-11-21	Greenfield, Massachusetts
	(United States)	G. Roland Crampton	Senior	LW			1901-07-25	Brookline, Massachusetts
	(United States)	Donald Lawson	Senior	D				Brooklyn, New York
	(United States)	Norman Lawson	Sophomore	C				Brooklyn, New York
	(United States)	John W. Leaycraft	Graduate	G			1901-01-24	Jersey City, New Jersey

== Standings ==
1924–25 Eastern Collegiate ice hockey standings
	Intercollegiate							Overall					
	GP	W	L	T	Pct.	GF	GA	GP	W	L	T	GF	GA
Amherst	5	2	3	0	.400	11	24	5	2	3	0	11	24
Army	6	3	2	1	.583	16	12	7	3	3	1	16	17
Bates	7	1	6	0	.143	12	27	8	1	7	0	13	33
Boston College	2	1	1	0	.500	3	1	16	8	6	2	40	27
Boston University	11	6	4	1	.591	30	24	12	7	4	1	34	25
Bowdoin	3	2	1	0	.667	10	7	4	2	2	0	12	13
Clarkson	4	0	4	0	.000	2	31	6	0	6	0	9	46
Colby	3	0	3	0	.000	0	16	4	0	4	0	1	20
Cornell	5	1	4	0	.200	7	23	5	1	4	0	7	23
Dartmouth	–	–	–	–	–	–	–	8	4	3	1	28	12
Hamilton	–	–	–	–	–	–	–	12	8	3	1	60	21
Harvard	10	8	2	0	.800	38	20	12	8	4	0	44	34
Massachusetts Agricultural	7	2	5	0	.286	13	38	7	2	5	0	13	38
Middlebury	2	1	1	0	.500	1	8	2	1	1	0	1	8
MIT	8	2	4	2	.375	15	28	9	2	5	2	17	32
New Hampshire	3	2	1	0	.667	8	6	4	2	2	0	9	11
Princeton	9	3	6	0	.333	27	24	17	8	9	0	59	54
Rensselaer	4	2	2	0	.500	19	7	4	2	2	0	19	7
Syracuse	1	1	0	0	1.000	3	1	4	1	3	0	6	13
Union	4	1	3	0	.250	8	22	4	1	3	0	8	22
Williams	7	3	4	0	.429	26	17	8	4	4	0	33	19
Yale	13	11	1	1	.885	46	12	16	14	1	1	57	16

== Schedule and results ==
Date	Opponent	Site	Result	Record
Regular Season
January 20	at Massachusetts Agricultural*	Alumni Field Rink • Amherst, Massachusetts	W 3–2	1–0–0
January 28	Bates*	Pratt Field Rink • Amherst, Massachusetts	W 5–1	2–0–0
January	at Army*	Stuart Rink • West Point, New York	L 0–2	2–1–0
February 5	at Williams*	Weston Field Rink • Williamstown, Massachusetts	L 1–12	2–2–0
February 14	at Hamilton*	Russell Sage Rink • Clinton, New York	L 2–7	2–3–0
*Non-conference game.
