= 1924–25 Boston University Terriers men's ice hockey season =

- Conference: Independent
- Home ice: Boston Arena

Record
- Overall: 7–4–1
- Home: 2–1–0
- Road: 3–1–0
- Neutral: 2–2–1

Coaches and captains
- Head coach: Chippy Gaw
- Captain: Morey Kontoff

The 1924–25 Boston University Terriers men's ice hockey season was the 5th season of play for the program. The Terriers were coached by Chippy Gaw in his 1st season.

== Season ==
After an abysmal season the year before, the athletic department decided to hire a new coach and were able to get Chippy Gaw from Princeton. Gaw's success with the Tigers recommended him for the job, however, the team did not get off to the best start. The first game with MIT was a hard-fought battle that with Goldfine scoring the first goal of the season. Julius Kontoff sandwiched a pair of goal around a MIT marker while the elder Kontoff and Viano held back the Engineers. However, with less than 2 minutes remaining, Tech was able to tie the match for a third time and send it into overtime. Neither squad could score in the 10 minutes that followed and the game was declared a draw. After both sides had agreed to a rematch later in the year, BU ran into the buzz saw that was Harvard. After a slow first period, BU began to play Harvard physically, hoping to get the Crimson off of their game. Harvard responded in kind and the rest of the game saw a consistent march to the penalty box. At one time in the third period, five players were sitting in the sin bin. Unfortunately for BU, the tactic didn't work and the Crimson were able to solve the Terriers' defense 6 times en route to a comfortable win. Viano netted the lone goal for BU in the match. Just before the winter break, BU renewed hostilities with their inaugural opponent, Boston College. Don Martin was the star of the game, turning aside every salvo from the Eagles while a solo rush from Viano ended up netting the first game-winner on the year.

Once the players returned from the break, they het the road for a 2-game swing through New York. Hamilton, one of the strongest teams in the country, proved too much for the Terriers. The offense faltered and was unable to get a single goal in the game. As if to makeup for the lack of scoring, the following night forward unit finally earned their stripes when Lawless and Scott each recorded a pair to lead the team to a 7–2 win. The victory proved to be a turning point for the program as it started the first winning streak in program history. The next game saw Scott and Ling with two goals apiece to mark the first time the program had won consecutive games in its history.

The rematch with MIT was just as close as the first, despite the absence of the Kontoff brothers, but the game saw Gregoire come into his own by netting both goals in the 2–1 win. At the end of the month, BU went on another journey through New York but this time was able to come back unscathed with wins against Army and Briarcliff Lodge. Captain Morey Kontoff was still away from the team when it took on New Hampshire in early February but the team didn't appear to notice as they easily handed the Wildcats, who were hampered by a lack of practice. Gregoire's hat-trick led the way for the team's sixth consecutive win. The game was also notable for the debut of Martin on the defense.

With the team already assured of their best season in program history, the team faced a very tough challenge in its final two games. With Martin back in the cage, the team played host to the Elis and their defense was tested throughout the game. Morey Kontoff, who was finally back with the club, opened the scoring in the first. The Terrier defense then set up a nigh-impenetrable wall for the remainder of the game and turned aside a myriad of Bulldogs chances. Yale's offense was too powerful to completely stop but BU held the Elis' to just 2 goals on the night. Unfortunately, the Yale defense was equally impressive and with Kontoff's marker being the only goal that the Terriers could get, the team fell to the eventual Intercollegiate Champions. Boston University ended the year with a rematch against BC and the Eagles were looking for revenge. Martin was again the star of the game, however, this time he was bested by Boston College. The Terrier offense never got going in the match and the team was shutout for the second time on the year.

== Roster ==
| No. | Nat. | Player | Class | Pos | Height | Weight | DoB | Hometown | Previous team |
|---|---|---|---|---|---|---|---|---|---|
| | | David Duane | | D |
| | | Flemming |
| | | David Goldfine | | D |
| | | Ovila Gregoire | Freshman | D/W |
| | | Peter Kelley | | G |
| | | Julian Kontoff | | C/LW |
| | | Morris Kontoff (C) | | D |
| | | John Lawless | Freshman | RW |
| | | Roderick Ling | | D/RW |
| | | Donald Martin | Freshman | G/D |
| | | Chester Scott | | C/LW/RW |
| | | Scribner | | LW |
| | | Charles Viano | Freshman | D |
| | | William Wennerberg | | C/RW |

== Standings ==
1924–25 Eastern Collegiate ice hockey standings
| | Intercollegiate | | | | | | | Overall | | | | | |
| | GP | W | L | T | Pct. | GF | GA | GP | W | L | T | GF | GA |
|---|---|---|---|---|---|---|---|---|---|---|---|---|---|
| Amherst | 5 | 2 | 3 | 0 | .400 | 11 | 24 | 5 | 2 | 3 | 0 | 11 | 24 |
| Army | 6 | 3 | 2 | 1 | .583 | 16 | 12 | 7 | 3 | 3 | 1 | 16 | 17 |
| Bates | 7 | 1 | 6 | 0 | .143 | 12 | 27 | 8 | 1 | 7 | 0 | 13 | 33 |
| Boston College | 2 | 1 | 1 | 0 | .500 | 3 | 1 | 16 | 8 | 6 | 2 | 40 | 27 |
| Boston University | 11 | 6 | 4 | 1 | .591 | 30 | 24 | 12 | 7 | 4 | 1 | 34 | 25 |
| Bowdoin | 3 | 2 | 1 | 0 | .667 | 10 | 7 | 4 | 2 | 2 | 0 | 12 | 13 |
| Clarkson | 4 | 0 | 4 | 0 | .000 | 2 | 31 | 6 | 0 | 6 | 0 | 9 | 46 |
| Colby | 3 | 0 | 3 | 0 | .000 | 0 | 16 | 4 | 0 | 4 | 0 | 1 | 20 |
| Cornell | 5 | 1 | 4 | 0 | .200 | 7 | 23 | 5 | 1 | 4 | 0 | 7 | 23 |
| Dartmouth | – | – | – | – | – | – | – | 8 | 4 | 3 | 1 | 28 | 12 |
| Hamilton | – | – | – | – | – | – | – | 12 | 8 | 3 | 1 | 60 | 21 |
| Harvard | 10 | 8 | 2 | 0 | .800 | 38 | 20 | 12 | 8 | 4 | 0 | 44 | 34 |
| Massachusetts Agricultural | 7 | 2 | 5 | 0 | .286 | 13 | 38 | 7 | 2 | 5 | 0 | 13 | 38 |
| Middlebury | 2 | 1 | 1 | 0 | .500 | 1 | 8 | 2 | 1 | 1 | 0 | 1 | 8 |
| MIT | 8 | 2 | 4 | 2 | .375 | 15 | 28 | 9 | 2 | 5 | 2 | 17 | 32 |
| New Hampshire | 3 | 2 | 1 | 0 | .667 | 8 | 6 | 4 | 2 | 2 | 0 | 9 | 11 |
| Princeton | 9 | 3 | 6 | 0 | .333 | 27 | 24 | 17 | 8 | 9 | 0 | 59 | 54 |
| Rensselaer | 4 | 2 | 2 | 0 | .500 | 19 | 7 | 4 | 2 | 2 | 0 | 19 | 7 |
| Syracuse | 1 | 1 | 0 | 0 | 1.000 | 3 | 1 | 4 | 1 | 3 | 0 | 6 | 13 |
| Union | 4 | 1 | 3 | 0 | .250 | 8 | 22 | 4 | 1 | 3 | 0 | 8 | 22 |
| Williams | 7 | 3 | 4 | 0 | .429 | 26 | 17 | 8 | 4 | 4 | 0 | 33 | 19 |
| Yale | 13 | 11 | 1 | 1 | .885 | 46 | 12 | 16 | 14 | 1 | 1 | 57 | 16 |

== Schedule and results ==
| Date | Opponent | Site | Result | Record |
Regular Season
| December 5 | vs. MIT* | Boston Arena • Boston, Massachusetts | T 3–3 ^{2OT} | 0–0–1 |
| December 16 | vs. Harvard* | Boston Arena • Boston, Massachusetts | L 1–6 | 0–1–1 |
| December 21 | vs. Boston College* | Boston Arena • Boston, Massachusetts | W 1–0 | 1–1–1 |
| January 9 | at Hamilton* | Russell Sage Rink • Clinton, New York | L 0–2 | 1–2–1 |
| January 10 | at Cornell* | Beebe Lake • Ithaca, New York | W 7–2 | 2–2–1 |
| January 16 | Bowdoin* | Boston Arena • Boston, Massachusetts | W 6–1 | 3–2–1 |
| January 21 | vs. MIT* | Boston Arena • Boston, Massachusetts | W 2–1 | 4–2–1 |
| January 28 | at Army* | Stuart Rink • West Point, New York | W 4–3 | 5–2–1 |
| January 31 | at Briarcliff Lodge* | Briarcliff Manor, New York | W 4–1 | 6–2–1 |
| February 5 | New Hampshire* | Boston Arena • Boston, Massachusetts | W 5–1 | 7–2–1 |
| February 11 | Yale* | Boston Arena • Boston, Massachusetts | L 1–2 | 7–3–1 |
| February 16 | vs. Boston College* | Boston Arena • Boston, Massachusetts | L 0–3 | 7–4–1 |
*Non-conference game.

== Scoring statistics ==
| Name | Position | Games | Goals |
|---|---|---|---|
| Ovila Gregore | D/LW/RW | - | 11 |
| David Goldfine | D | 10 | 2 |
| David Duane | D | - | 0 |
| Peter Kelley | G | - | 0 |
| Donald Martin | G/D | - | 0 |
| William Wennerberg | C/RW | - | 0 |
| Scribner | LW | 1 | 0 |
| John Lawless | RW | - | - |
| Rod Ling | D/RW | - | - |
| Julian Kontoff | C | - | - |
| Morey Kontoff | D | - | - |
| Chester Scott | C/LW/RW | - | - |
| Charles Viano | D | - | - |
| Total | | | |
