= 1924–25 Boston College Eagles men's ice hockey season =

- Conference: Independent
- Home ice: Boston Arena

Record
- Overall: 8–6–2
- Home: 5–7–0
- Road: 1–0–0
- Neutral: 1–3–1

Coaches and captains
- Head coach: Charles Foote
- Captain: Jack Culhane

The 1924–25 Boston College Eagles men's ice hockey season was the 8th season of play for the program. The Eagles were coached by Charles Foote in his 2nd season.

== Season ==
Before the start of the season, Charles Foote delayed signing on for a second season with the Eagles, however, he was unable to keep himself away. Jack Culhane was elected captain at the end of the previous year and led a squad that was largely unchanged from the previous season. BC's chief complaint from '24, a lack of reserves, was addressed by the addition of several new players as well as the return of Rocky Curry from appendicitis. While Boston College was still forced to schedule most of its games with amateur clubs and Canadian colleges, as the preeminent US schools still refused to meet the Eagles, the team rekindled its budding rivalry with Boston University with a pair of games.

BC kicked off the season just before Christmas against BU but found themselves on the wrong end of an 0–1 score. BC then played four games against visiting Canadian colleges and, though they kept the score close, lost three consecutive matches. BC finally ended their downwards spiral with a resounding victory over Queen's. While the offense finding its game was largely responsible for the victory, local lore attributed the change to Jack Fitzgerald's new haircut. During the 4-game losing streak, Fitzgerald had sported a von Hindenburg haircut and, convinced by $15 bet from his teammates, Fitzgerald agreed to shave his head completely before the match. The victory was the turning point of the season for the Eagles.

After an exhibition match with a collection of local college All-stars, BC went dormant for the exam break and gave time enough for Eddie Spang to arrange a trip north. Beginning in late January, the Eagles travelled to Canada, finally accepting the invitation from the northern colleges. Unfortunately, the trip ended up being cancelled and the Canadians were once more forced to travel to Boston. Instead, two amateur teams were swiftly scheduled but the Eagles rolled over their opponents regardless. Fitzgerald was nigh unbeatable over a 4-game stretch that saw him surrender just a single goal. The new-look Eagles were then tested when McGill arrived in mid-February. The results mirrored the earlier meeting between the two but BC was still unable to defeat the Redmen. The Eagles responded well the following week, downing Montreal in a pair of games to end the month with a winning record.

The team ended the year with three games against amateur teams in March. First was a rematch with the Boston Athletic Association that saw a tightly contested match head into overtime. The B.A.A. scored a quick goal and forced the Eagles to play the remainder of the session with six attackers but all was for naught and the Eagles were defeated. A few days later, the Montreal AAA arrived in town and BC put in a much sturdier defensive effort. The 3–1 victory ensured the team of a winning record on the season. The final game was the rubber match with B.A.A. and gave the rabid crowd a show. The teams exchanged goals at the start of the match but the amateurs pulled ahead just before the end of the period. The Eagles had to weather a barrage of shots in the middle frame and managed to keep the score at 1–2. It was much the same in the third, with Fitzgerald turning aside everything that was sent in his direction, but the Eagles still needed a goal to tie. With just 3 minutes to play, Eddie Mullowney raced down the ice and fired a hard shot wide. The puck rebounded off of the back wall and settled off to the side of the cage. Mullowney was the first to reach the puck and fired it from a difficult angle into the net for the tying goal. Three 10-minute overtime sessions were played but no further scoring occurred. After 75 minutes of hard, fast play, the game was called, leaving the better of the two squads undecided.

Edmund Spang served as team manager.

== Roster ==
No.	Nat.	Player	Class	Pos	Height	Weight	DoB	Hometown	Previous team
	(United States)	John F. Culhane	Senior					Cambridge, Massachusetts
	(United States)	John R. Curry	Senior (RS)					Cambridge, Massachusetts
	(United States)	John C. Fitzgerald (C)	Senior	G				Cambridge, Massachusetts
	(United States)	James H. Foley	Senior	F			1901-10-28	Cambridge, Massachusetts
	(United States)	Arthur J. Gorman	Junior					Roxbury, Massachusetts
	(United States)	Henry E. Groden	Junior					Cambridge, Massachusetts
	(United States)	Arthur R. Johnson	Junior					Brookline, Massachusetts
	(United States)	Francis X. Mahoney	Junior					Cambridge, Massachusetts
	(United States)	William H. Mahoney Jr.	Junior					Cambridge, Massachusetts
	(United States)	Edward O. Mullowney	Junior					Brookline, Massachusetts

== Standings ==
1924–25 Eastern Collegiate ice hockey standings
	Intercollegiate							Overall					
	GP	W	L	T	Pct.	GF	GA	GP	W	L	T	GF	GA
Amherst	5	2	3	0	.400	11	24	5	2	3	0	11	24
Army	6	3	2	1	.583	16	12	7	3	3	1	16	17
Bates	7	1	6	0	.143	12	27	8	1	7	0	13	33
Boston College	2	1	1	0	.500	3	1	16	8	6	2	40	27
Boston University	11	6	4	1	.591	30	24	12	7	4	1	34	25
Bowdoin	3	2	1	0	.667	10	7	4	2	2	0	12	13
Clarkson	4	0	4	0	.000	2	31	6	0	6	0	9	46
Colby	3	0	3	0	.000	0	16	4	0	4	0	1	20
Cornell	5	1	4	0	.200	7	23	5	1	4	0	7	23
Dartmouth	–	–	–	–	–	–	–	8	4	3	1	28	12
Hamilton	–	–	–	–	–	–	–	12	8	3	1	60	21
Harvard	10	8	2	0	.800	38	20	12	8	4	0	44	34
Massachusetts Agricultural	7	2	5	0	.286	13	38	7	2	5	0	13	38
Middlebury	2	1	1	0	.500	1	8	2	1	1	0	1	8
MIT	8	2	4	2	.375	15	28	9	2	5	2	17	32
New Hampshire	3	2	1	0	.667	8	6	4	2	2	0	9	11
Princeton	9	3	6	0	.333	27	24	17	8	9	0	59	54
Rensselaer	4	2	2	0	.500	19	7	4	2	2	0	19	7
Syracuse	1	1	0	0	1.000	3	1	4	1	3	0	6	13
Union	4	1	3	0	.250	8	22	4	1	3	0	8	22
Williams	7	3	4	0	.429	26	17	8	4	4	0	33	19
Yale	13	11	1	1	.885	46	12	16	14	1	1	57	16

== Schedule and results ==
Date	Opponent	Site	Result	Record
Regular Season
December 23	vs. Boston University*	Boston Arena • Boston, Massachusetts (Rivalry)	L 0–1	0–1–0
December 27	Toronto*	Boston Arena • Boston, Massachusetts	L 2–4	0–2–0
January 1	McGill*	Boston Arena • Boston, Massachusetts	L 1–2	0–3–0
January 3	Toronto*	Boston Arena • Boston, Massachusetts	L 2–4	0–4–0
January 6	Queen's*	Boston Arena • Boston, Massachusetts	W 7–1	1–4–0
January 8	vs. Boston All-Stars*	Jamaica Pond • Jamaica Plain, Massachusetts (Exhibition)	T 1–1	
January 31	Loyola*	Boston Arena • Boston, Massachusetts	W 3–1	2–4–0
February 7	St. Nicholas Hockey Club*	Boston Arena • Boston, Massachusetts	W 1–0	3–4–0
February 9	vs. Boston Athletic Association*	Boston Arena • Boston, Massachusetts	W 2–0	4–4–0
February 16	Boston University*	Boston Arena • Boston, Massachusetts (Rivalry)	W 3–0	5–4–0
February 19	McGill*	Boston Arena • Boston, Massachusetts	T 2–2	5–4–1
February 20	McGill*	Boston Arena • Boston, Massachusetts	L 1–2	5–5–1
February 27	Montreal*	Boston Arena • Boston, Massachusetts	W 3–0	6–5–1
February 28	Montreal*	Boston Arena • Boston, Massachusetts	W 4–2	7–5–1
March 5	Boston Athletic Association*	Boston Arena • Boston, Massachusetts	L 4–5 ^{OT}	7–6–1
March 7	Montreal AAA*	Boston Arena • Boston, Massachusetts	W 3–1	8–6–1
March 12	vs. Boston Athletic Association*	Boston Arena • Boston, Massachusetts	T 2–2 ^{3OT}	8–6–2
*Non-conference game.
