= 1924–25 Massachusetts Agricultural Aggies men's ice hockey season =

- Conference: Independent
- Home ice: Alumni Field Rink

Record
- Overall: 2–5–0
- Home: 2–1–0
- Road: 0–4–0

Coaches and captains
- Head coach: Lorin Ball
- Captain: John Crosby

The 1924–25 Massachusetts Agricultural Aggies men's ice hockey season was the 17th season of play for the program. The Aggies were coached by Lorin Ball in his first season.

== Season ==
For the third consecutive season, the ice hockey team had a new head coach. With the departure of Doc Gordon, the club needed a stable hand at the till and the freshman baseball coach, Lorin Ball agreed to take over. Essentially not having played the sport before, Ball had a steep learning curve and was forced to rely on the veteran players for guidance. Other than team captain John Crosby, only Sammy Gordon and Buddy Moberg had seen significant ice time previously and were largely responsible for designing the structure for the team. Warm weather forced the team onto a local pond for the opening game but the slow ice helped the Aggies to in the match. Williams was the faster of the two outfits and the poor conditions prevented them from using those strengths. Moberg's pair led MAC to victory and a positive outlook as the club headed into a busy schedule.

After the auspicious start, MAC headed south to take on Yale and were completely outplayed by the defending intercollegiate champions. Yale stormed out of the gate and scored 7 goals in the first period. The Elis were able to relax after the torrid start and only scored 4 more for the remainder of the game. Near the end of the match, Crosby got the Aggies on the board but that did nothing to change the outcome. The team continued its road swing into New York two days later and faced Hamilton on its home rink. Just like Yale, the Continentals used an indoor, artificial rink and the pristine ice left the slower Aggies unable to cope. MAC played better than they had against the Bulldogs but the offense was still lacking and they were unable to solve the Hamilton netminder. The end of the trip came against Cornell the following afternoon and provided the closest match of the season. While the Aggies were tired out from having little rest, the irregular ice on Beebe Lake was more familiar to the players and they were able to get to their game more effectively. Cornell opened the scoring after a slow start from MAC but the team seemed to find its skating legs in the second. A second goal from the Big Red resulted from a comedy of errors but still left the Aggies down by 2. Moberg finally got his team on the board with a few minutes remaining and the team did what it could to find the tying marker but time ran out before they could get another.

Once the team returned home, they found that the warm weather, which had caused an earlier match with Amherst to be scrapped, had returned. The second match with the Lord Jeffs was postponed for a week while the succeeding game against Bates was pushed until a week later. Without any ice to practice on, the time off wasn't of any particular help for the team, however, neither they nor Amherst were prepared to play a game in a blizzard. In severe conditions that saw the ice covered in snow despite the efforts of the freshman team to keep it clean, MAC played probably the most unique game in its history. The opening goal came as a result of Amherst sending the puck through a hole in the net and out in front of the cage before a second player shot it back into the cage. Moberg responded with a 0-angle shot that hit a Sabrina defender in the arm and deflected into the goal. the Jeffs scored two conventional goals in the second and while Potter was able to cut into the lead in the third, none of the Maroon players could get the tying goal. While the wind was just as blustery in the match with Bates, the snow was mercifully absent. Moberg and Crosby combined to give the team a 3-goal lead early in the game. Entering the third everything pointed to a win for the Aggies, however, the Bobcats roared back to the game and force overtime. Two 10-minute overtime periods passed without effect but Taylor finally managed to break the tie in the third. Moberg finished off his hat-trick in the waning moments to cap off the much-needed win.

The day after the games with Bates, MAC headed up to take on Dartmouth. The game was eerily reminiscent of the Yale game when the Greens got off to a flying start. When the dust settled, the Aggies were down 0–7 and the game was effectively over. The Indians used several substitutes afterwards and, though they scored a further 7 goals, the Aggies were able to get 2 goals against the reserves. MAC was hoping it could wash the taste of the embarrassing loss out in one of their final two games. Unfortunately, the weather grew warmer and both matches ended up being cancelled.

George Hanscomb served as team manager.

== Roster ==
No.	Nat.	Player	Class	Pos	Height	Weight	DoB	Hometown	Previous team
	(United States)	F. Joseph Cormier	Junior	D/W				Newtonville, Massachusetts
	(United States)	John S. Crosby (C)	Senior	D			1902-12-11	Arlington, Massachusetts
	(United States)	Samuel F. Gordon	Junior	D				Ipswich, Massachusetts
	(United States)	Charles R. McGeoch	Senior	D			1899-09-12	York, Maine
	(United States)	Herbert F. Moberg	Junior	C				Brockton, Massachusetts
	(United States)	Cary D. Palmer	Junior	G				Grafton, Vermont
	(United States)	Royal W. Potter	Junior	LW			1901-11-06	Providence, Rhode Island
	(United States)	Dudley D. Sprague	Senior	D			1902-03-26	Melrose, Massachusetts
	(United States)	William T. Stopford	Junior	LW/RW				Newtonville, Massachusetts
	(United States)	Milton W. Taylor	Senior	RW			1904-01-12	Chatham, Massachusetts
	(United States)	Montague White	Junior	F			1903-11-27	West Hartford, Connecticut

== Standings ==
1924–25 Eastern Collegiate ice hockey standings
	Intercollegiate							Overall					
	GP	W	L	T	Pct.	GF	GA	GP	W	L	T	GF	GA
Amherst	5	2	3	0	.400	11	24	5	2	3	0	11	24
Army	6	3	2	1	.583	16	12	7	3	3	1	16	17
Bates	7	1	6	0	.143	12	27	8	1	7	0	13	33
Boston College	2	1	1	0	.500	3	1	16	8	6	2	40	27
Boston University	11	6	4	1	.591	30	24	12	7	4	1	34	25
Bowdoin	3	2	1	0	.667	10	7	4	2	2	0	12	13
Clarkson	4	0	4	0	.000	2	31	6	0	6	0	9	46
Colby	3	0	3	0	.000	0	16	4	0	4	0	1	20
Cornell	5	1	4	0	.200	7	23	5	1	4	0	7	23
Dartmouth	–	–	–	–	–	–	–	8	4	3	1	28	12
Hamilton	–	–	–	–	–	–	–	12	8	3	1	60	21
Harvard	10	8	2	0	.800	38	20	12	8	4	0	44	34
Massachusetts Agricultural	7	2	5	0	.286	13	38	7	2	5	0	13	38
Middlebury	2	1	1	0	.500	1	8	2	1	1	0	1	8
MIT	8	2	4	2	.375	15	28	9	2	5	2	17	32
New Hampshire	3	2	1	0	.667	8	6	4	2	2	0	9	11
Princeton	9	3	6	0	.333	27	24	17	8	9	0	59	54
Rensselaer	4	2	2	0	.500	19	7	4	2	2	0	19	7
Syracuse	1	1	0	0	1.000	3	1	4	1	3	0	6	13
Union	4	1	3	0	.250	8	22	4	1	3	0	8	22
Williams	7	3	4	0	.429	26	17	8	4	4	0	33	19
Yale	13	11	1	1	.885	46	12	16	14	1	1	57	16

== Schedule and results ==
Date	Opponent	Site	Result	Record
Regular Season
January 10	Williams*	Campus Pond • Amherst, Massachusetts	W 2–0	1–0–0
January 14	at Yale*	Bishops Pond • Woodbridge, Connecticut	L 1–11	1–1–0
January 16	at Hamilton*	Russell Sage Rink • Clinton, New York	L 0–5	1–2–0
January 17	at Cornell*	Beebe Lake • Ithaca, New York	L 1–2	1–3–0
January 20	Amherst*	Alumni Field Rink • Amherst, Massachusetts	L 2–3	1–4–0
January 27	Bates*	Alumni Field Rink • Amherst, Massachusetts	W 5–3 ^{3OT}	2–4–0
February 4	at Dartmouth*	Occom Pond • Hanover, New Hampshire	L 2–14	2–5–0
*Non-conference game.

Note: the games against Yale, Amherst and Dartmouth were played with 20-minute periods. All others used 15-minute periods.

== Scoring statistics ==
Name	Position	Games	Goals
Buddy Moberg	C	7	7
John Crosby	D	7	2
Red Potter	LW	7	2
Milt Taylor	RW	7	2
Charles McGeoch	D	1	0
Dudley Sprague	D	1	0
Bill Stopford	LW/RW	4	0
Joe Cormier	D/LW/RW	5	0
Monty White	C/LW/RW	5	0
Sammy Gordon	D	7	0
Cary Palmer	G	7	0
Total			13

== Goaltending statistics ==
Name	Games	Minutes	Wins	Losses	Ties	Goals Against	Saves	Shut Outs	SV %	GAA
Cary Palmer	7	390	2	5	0	38		1		4.38
Total	7	390	2	5	0	38		1		4.38

Note: goals against average is based upon a 45-minute regulation game.
