= 1924–25 MIT Engineers men's ice hockey season =

- Conference: Independent
- Home ice: Boston Arena

Record
- Overall: 2–5–2
- Home: 0–1–0
- Road: 1–2–1
- Neutral: 1–2–1

Coaches and captains
- Head coach: Gerald Wiggett
- Captain: Philip Niles

The 1924–25 MIT Engineers men's ice hockey season was the 24th season of play for the program. The Engineers were coached by Gerald Wiggett in his 1st season.

== Season ==
MIT began their season in early November with former players Flint and Taylor putting the Engineers through their paces. While the team was only able to get ice time at 7:00 am, the team used the Boston Arena to the utmost and worked themselves into a cohesive unit. Just before the first game, the school hired Gerald Wiggett as the head coach and he arrived in time to make the final cuts. The Engineers started slow and found themselves down by a pair midway through the first. A long-distance shot from Randell just before the end of the period cut the lead in half. After Freeman tied the game at the midway point, Boston University regained their lead just 27 seconds into the third. MIT continually attacked the Terrier goal but were turned away time and again. With less than 2 minutes remaining, Morton finally broke through to tie the match and send it into overtime. Despite a concerted effort in two additional 10-minute periods, neither team was able to score and the game was declared a draw. BU requested a rematch immediately afterwards and while MIT agreed, a date for the second contest was not set until later.

After surpassing their entire offensive output of last season in just one game, MIT looked ready to take on their old nemesis and met Harvard the following week. The Engineers were expecting a hard fight from the Crimson and that's exactly what they got. Unfortunately, it was more than the team could handle; Harvard's much faster team kept MIT off of the scoresheet until the third period and managed to score the first 6 goals of the match. While the Engineers held the Crimson at bay in the first, a 4-goal second period all but ended the match. Moulton's two goals in the third made the final result a bit less embarrassing but the game was Harvard's from start to finish.

The team had nearly a month to prepare for the next match as the winter break put most colleges on pause until after Christmas. When MIT returned they did so against another top program and had a similar result to the Harvard game. Dartmouth was easily able to outpace the Engineers and send them back to Massachusetts with another 5-goal defeat. Though the loss was undeniable, it was an improvement over the 1–11 drubbing that they had received from the Indians the year before.

After another week of practice, MIT hit the road for a match with Army. The team looked like it had forgotten about their earlier defeats and played as well as it had all season. Unfortunately, the poor state of the ice prevented outstanding play and the Engineers were forced to restrict themselves to plodding along the soft ice. Randell scored the only goal for Tech and when regulation ended in a tie both teams agreed that the ice wasn't up to any more skating and agreed to call the match a draw. On their way home, the team played a match at the Briarcliff Lodge.

The following week, MIT was finally able to play off the tie with Boston University. The second game was just as close as the first with Randell opening the scoring in the first. BU nabbed two goals in the second to take the lead and were then able to ride the stellar play of their goaltender to a narrow victory. With Tech still looking for its first win of the season, they took a second trip to New York and met Cornell on Cayuga Lake. MIT had to defend the windy end of the rink but Berkley and Crandall played tremendously and held the Big Red back. Morton and Randell each scored to give MIT just enough offense for the win. The next night the team was in the much more comfortable Russell Sage Rink and enjoyed the fast ice. Weisser opened the scoring on a pass from Morton while Berkley's solo effort gave the Engineers a 2-goal lead. Deignan was a pillar in goal, stopping more than 50 shots in the game, but he couldn't keep everything out of the net. Hamilton scored twice to force overtime but MIT reversed the momentum and Morton scored in the first 90 seconds of extra time. Deignan and the defense combined to prevent any further goals and MIT skated away with their second win.

MIT was looking to keep its winning streak alive when it headed up to Maine in February, however, a warm spell rendered all available rink unusable. After being unable to find any place to play, MIT had to return home without anything to show for their trip. The team rounded out its season with a game against the nation's top team, Yale. The game was marred by poor ice that slowed down both teams but the Elis, unsurprisingly, proved to be the victors. The Bulldogs started strong with three goals in the first but MIT's defense responded afterwards. Yale scored just once in the final two periods and MIT acquitted themselves well against the eventual intercollegiate champions.

Charles E. Poore served as team manager with Richard Carroll, James Cassidy and Gordon Jacoby as his assistants.

== Roster ==
No.	Nat.	Player	Class	Pos	Height	Weight	DoB	Hometown	Previous team
	(United States)	William P. Berkeley	Sophomore	D			1905-07-13	Cambridge, Massachusetts
	(United States)	Samuel W. Brooks	Junior	C			1904-09-27	Everett, Massachusetts
	(United States)	Frank J. Crandall	Sophomore	D/RW			1904-01-01	Everett, Massachusetts
	(United States)	Henry V. Cunningham Jr.	Senior				1900-11-08	Boston, Massachusetts
	(United States)	John E. Deignan	Junior	G			1903-04-16	East Orange, New Jersey
	(United States)	Raymond A. Freeman	Junior	LW			1905-11-19	Boston, Massachusetts
	(United States)	William F. Morton	Senior	C			1905-06-29	Medford, Massachusetts
	(United States)	Edwin J. Moulton	Junior	C			1903-06-02	Boston, Massachusetts
	(Canada)	Philip C. Niles (C)	Senior	D/RW			1905-05-13	Toronto, Ontario
	(United States)	Sumner S. Randell Jr.	Junior	LW			1904-02-19	Quincy, Massachusetts
	(United States)	William H. Richards	Sophomore	G			1906-06-16	Boston, Massachusetts
	(United States)	Otto B. Wiessner	Junior	LW/RW			1904-03-22	Brookline, Massachusetts
	(Poland)	Eugene J. Zubrinski	Junior	D

== Standings ==
1924–25 Eastern Collegiate ice hockey standings
	Intercollegiate							Overall					
	GP	W	L	T	Pct.	GF	GA	GP	W	L	T	GF	GA
Amherst	5	2	3	0	.400	11	24	5	2	3	0	11	24
Army	6	3	2	1	.583	16	12	7	3	3	1	16	17
Bates	7	1	6	0	.143	12	27	8	1	7	0	13	33
Boston College	2	1	1	0	.500	3	1	16	8	6	2	40	27
Boston University	11	6	4	1	.591	30	24	12	7	4	1	34	25
Bowdoin	3	2	1	0	.667	10	7	4	2	2	0	12	13
Clarkson	4	0	4	0	.000	2	31	6	0	6	0	9	46
Colby	3	0	3	0	.000	0	16	4	0	4	0	1	20
Cornell	5	1	4	0	.200	7	23	5	1	4	0	7	23
Dartmouth	–	–	–	–	–	–	–	8	4	3	1	28	12
Hamilton	–	–	–	–	–	–	–	12	8	3	1	60	21
Harvard	10	8	2	0	.800	38	20	12	8	4	0	44	34
Massachusetts Agricultural	7	2	5	0	.286	13	38	7	2	5	0	13	38
Middlebury	2	1	1	0	.500	1	8	2	1	1	0	1	8
MIT	8	2	4	2	.375	15	28	9	2	5	2	17	32
New Hampshire	3	2	1	0	.667	8	6	4	2	2	0	9	11
Princeton	9	3	6	0	.333	27	24	17	8	9	0	59	54
Rensselaer	4	2	2	0	.500	19	7	4	2	2	0	19	7
Syracuse	1	1	0	0	1.000	3	1	4	1	3	0	6	13
Union	4	1	3	0	.250	8	22	4	1	3	0	8	22
Williams	7	3	4	0	.429	26	17	8	4	4	0	33	19
Yale	13	11	1	1	.885	46	12	16	14	1	1	57	16

== Schedule and results ==
Date	Opponent	Site	Result	Record
Regular Season
December 5	vs. Boston University*	Boston Arena • Boston, Massachusetts	T 3–3 ^{2OT}	0–0–1
December 11	vs. Harvard*	Boston Arena • Boston, Massachusetts	L 3–8	0–1–1
January 10	at Dartmouth*	Occom Pond • Hanover, New Hampshire	L 2–7	0–2–1
January 17	at Army*	Stuart Rink • West Point, New York	T 1–1	0–2–2
January 18	at Briarcliff Lodge*	Briarcliff Manor, New York	L 2–4	0–3–2
January 21	vs. Boston University*	Boston Arena • Boston, Massachusetts	L 1–2	0–4–2
January 23	at Cornell*	Cayuga Lake • Ithaca, New York	W 2–1	1–4–2
January 24	at Hamilton*	Russell Sage Rink • Clinton, New York	W 3–2 ^{2OT}	2–4–2
February 18	Yale*	Boston Arena • Boston, Massachusetts	L 0–4	2–5–2
*Non-conference game.
