= 1924–25 Williams Ephs men's ice hockey season =

College ice hockey team season

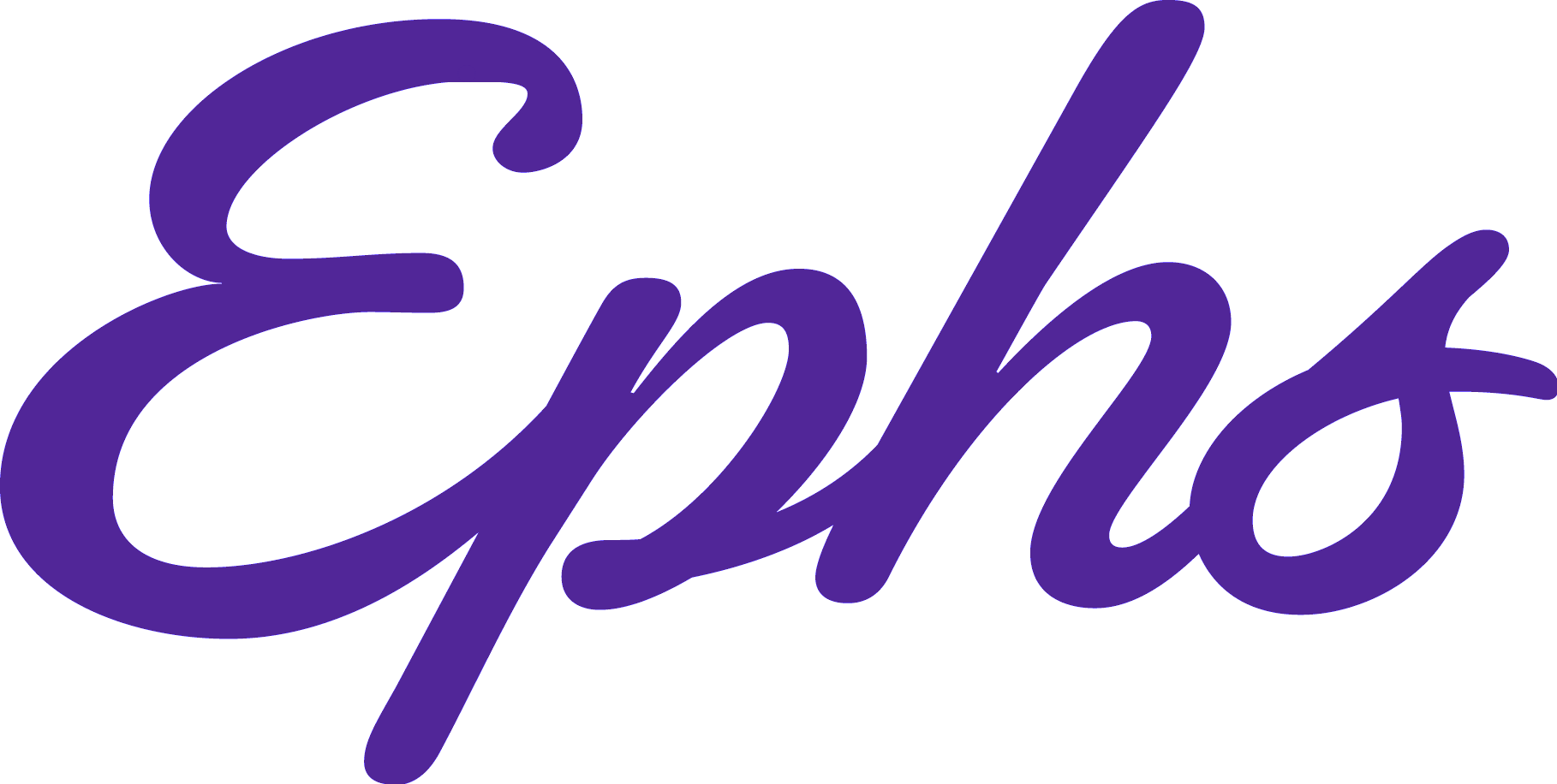
- Conference: Independent
- Home ice: Weston Field Rink

Record
- Overall: 4–4–0
- Home: 2–0–0
- Road: 1–1–0
- Neutral: 1–3–0

Coaches and captains
- Head coach: J. Philip Bower
- Captain: Harry Watkins

The 1924–25 Williams Ephs men's ice hockey season was the 22nd season of play for the program.

== Season ==
With the Ephs behind their third head coach in as many years, the team took a major step forward in the offseason when it was admitted into the Intercollegiate Ice Hockey Association. Williams was one of just two small colleges (the other being Hamilton) in the group with the other members being the seven active Ivy League schools. Rather than form a conference and compile a schedule, the league met to decide upon a uniform set of rules for college hockey, a vital necessity as there was no national governing body for the sport. The inclusion of Williams raised the profile for the program and gave it an authority commensurate with the school's longstanding dedication to the sport.

The team was also undergoing several changes on the ice, both positive and negative. With the loss of several key contributors, most notably star goaltender Marvin Lowes, Williams would need to replace a good number of its '24 lineup. Fortunately, the team had a very sizable contingent of players to pick from; 42 men showed up to the first practice which, unusually, was held in November. After having to deal with warm winters for several seasons, the region welcomed in an early chill and the surface of Leake's Pond froze over before Thanksgiving. At the time the team was being led solely by team captain Harry Watkins as a coach for the team had yet to be hired. In mid-December, the administration decided upon J. Philip Bower as the team's head coach and he immediately assumed the reigns.

With the team's impending Christmas trip to Lake Placid just weeks away, Bower had a shot time to put his stamp on the program. He did his best to organize the team around Watkins at center with Smith, Blaney and Popham on the wings. Howe, the veteran blueliner, stayed at his normal position while several players were cycled through on the other point. Chapman had an unenviable task of following one of the program's best goaltenders but still acquitted himself well in the opening series with Yale. Entering the games with fewer numbers and less preparation, the Ephs were soundly beaten in the first two matches. The defensing intercollegiate champion Elis were too fast for the Purple to keep up but, once they got their skating legs under them, Williams proved to be a match for the Bulldogs. The third game saw a much closer contest with the Ephs fighting back in the third. Watkins led a third period surge that came up just shy with the Purple falling 2–3. Though winless to this point, the Ephs strengthening performance in the series continued as they travelled to Buffalo and rolled over the Nichols hockey club 7–2. Popham was the star of the game with 4 goals but the biggest surprise came in the final match of the winter break when Williams defeated Princeton. The Tigers only goal came from when Popham accidentally knocked the puck into his own cage while Howe and Austin kept the Princeton attack at bay.

After their relatively successful start, the team was looking forward to a slate of 10 further games and opened against Massachusetts Agricultural. Unfortunately, poor ice conditions on the MAC rink forced the two teams onto a nearby pond. The less-than-satisfactory conditions were worsened by the lack of boards that forced the team to adapt a new style of play. The Ephs were unable to adjust in time and fell to the home team 0–2. After returning home, the team was met by the unwelcome sight of another warm winter. The team was hardly able to practice over a 2-week span and had to cancel a few games before finally squeezing in a match with Bates. As if he was making up for lost time, Watkins set a program record with 7 of the team's 8 goals in the game as the Ephs smothered the Bobcats. The game also had the distinction of being longer than normal with three 18-minute periods instead of the standard 15-minute frames.

The exam break caused the next pause to the season and Williams didn't play another game until early February. When they did get back onto the ice the Ephs demonstrated an overpowering brand of hockey seldom seen in a Purple jersey by hammering their ancient rivals, Amherst, 12–1. Watkins and Popham each recorded 4 goals in the game while Howe netted a pair. Several games remained on the team's schedule, however, due to a thaw throughout the region, Williams ended up having to cancel the remainder of their season. In all, the Ephs lost seven games to poor weather conditions, a fade made worse with how well the Purple had performed throughout the year.

Frank Gummey served as team manager with Frederick Cleveland as his assistant.

== Roster ==
| No. | Nat. | Player | Class | Pos | Height | Weight | DoB | Hometown | Previous team |
|---|---|---|---|---|---|---|---|---|---|
| | (United States) | Francis D. Austin | Freshman | D | | | | Douglaston, New York |
| | (United States) | Mills P. Baker | Junior | D | | | 1903-04-18 | Great Neck, New York |
| | (United States) | William O. Blaney | Freshman | RW | | | 1905-09-15 | Waban, Massachusetts |
| | (United States) | Daniel K. Chapman | Junior | G | | | | New York, New York |
| | (United States) | Lewis W. Francis Jr. | Senior | C/LW/RW | | | | Brooklyn, New York |
| | (United States) | Roger A. Gurley | Freshman | LW | | | 1905-11-16 | Minneapolis, Minnesota |
| | (United States) | Frederic W. Howe Jr. | Junior | D | | | | Providence, Rhode Island |
| | (United States) | Clinton S. Mason | Sophomore | RW | | | 1905-02-01 | Watertown, Massachusetts |
| | (United States) | Robert M. Popham | Junior | LW/RW | | | | New York, New York |
| | (United States) | Ebenezer Smith | Junior | D/RW | | | | New York, New York |
| | (United States) | Leonard H. Smith Jr. | Sophomore | LW/RW | | | 1904-02-03 | Brooklyn, New York |
| | (United States) | Harry A. Watkins | Junior | C | | | 1904-02-07 | South Orange, New Jersey |

== Standings ==
1924–25 Eastern Collegiate ice hockey standings
| | Intercollegiate | | | | | | | Overall | | | | | |
| | GP | W | L | T | Pct. | GF | GA | GP | W | L | T | GF | GA |
|---|---|---|---|---|---|---|---|---|---|---|---|---|---|
| Amherst | 5 | 2 | 3 | 0 | .400 | 11 | 24 | 5 | 2 | 3 | 0 | 11 | 24 |
| Army | 6 | 3 | 2 | 1 | .583 | 16 | 12 | 7 | 3 | 3 | 1 | 16 | 17 |
| Bates | 7 | 1 | 6 | 0 | .143 | 12 | 27 | 8 | 1 | 7 | 0 | 13 | 33 |
| Boston College | 2 | 1 | 1 | 0 | .500 | 3 | 1 | 16 | 8 | 6 | 2 | 40 | 27 |
| Boston University | 11 | 6 | 4 | 1 | .591 | 30 | 24 | 12 | 7 | 4 | 1 | 34 | 25 |
| Bowdoin | 3 | 2 | 1 | 0 | .667 | 10 | 7 | 4 | 2 | 2 | 0 | 12 | 13 |
| Clarkson | 4 | 0 | 4 | 0 | .000 | 2 | 31 | 6 | 0 | 6 | 0 | 9 | 46 |
| Colby | 3 | 0 | 3 | 0 | .000 | 0 | 16 | 4 | 0 | 4 | 0 | 1 | 20 |
| Cornell | 5 | 1 | 4 | 0 | .200 | 7 | 23 | 5 | 1 | 4 | 0 | 7 | 23 |
| Dartmouth | – | – | – | – | – | – | – | 8 | 4 | 3 | 1 | 28 | 12 |
| Hamilton | – | – | – | – | – | – | – | 12 | 8 | 3 | 1 | 60 | 21 |
| Harvard | 10 | 8 | 2 | 0 | .800 | 38 | 20 | 12 | 8 | 4 | 0 | 44 | 34 |
| Massachusetts Agricultural | 7 | 2 | 5 | 0 | .286 | 13 | 38 | 7 | 2 | 5 | 0 | 13 | 38 |
| Middlebury | 2 | 1 | 1 | 0 | .500 | 1 | 8 | 2 | 1 | 1 | 0 | 1 | 8 |
| MIT | 8 | 2 | 4 | 2 | .375 | 15 | 28 | 9 | 2 | 5 | 2 | 17 | 32 |
| New Hampshire | 3 | 2 | 1 | 0 | .667 | 8 | 6 | 4 | 2 | 2 | 0 | 9 | 11 |
| Princeton | 9 | 3 | 6 | 0 | .333 | 27 | 24 | 17 | 8 | 9 | 0 | 59 | 54 |
| Rensselaer | 4 | 2 | 2 | 0 | .500 | 19 | 7 | 4 | 2 | 2 | 0 | 19 | 7 |
| Syracuse | 1 | 1 | 0 | 0 | 1.000 | 3 | 1 | 4 | 1 | 3 | 0 | 6 | 13 |
| Union | 4 | 1 | 3 | 0 | .250 | 8 | 22 | 4 | 1 | 3 | 0 | 8 | 22 |
| Williams | 7 | 3 | 4 | 0 | .429 | 26 | 17 | 8 | 4 | 4 | 0 | 33 | 19 |
| Yale | 13 | 11 | 1 | 1 | .885 | 46 | 12 | 16 | 14 | 1 | 1 | 57 | 16 |

== Schedule and results ==
| Date | Opponent | Site | Decision | Result | Record |
Regular Season
| December 29 | vs. Yale* | Lake Placid Rink • Lake Placid, New York | Chapman | L 2–6 | 0–1–0 |
| December 30 | vs. Yale* | Lake Placid Rink • Lake Placid, New York | Chapman | L 0–3 | 0–2–0 |
| December 31 | vs. Yale* | Lake Placid Rink • Lake Placid, New York | Chapman | L 2–3 | 0–3–0 |
| January 2 | at Nichols Club* | Nichols School Rink • Buffalo, New York | Chapman | W 7–2 | 1–3–0 |
| January 3 | vs. Princeton* | Nichols School Rink • Buffalo, New York | Chapman | W 2–1 | 2–3–0 |
| January 10 | at Massachusetts Agricultural* | Campus Pond • Amherst, Massachusetts | Chapman | L 0–2 | 2–4–0 |
| January 23 | Bates* | Weston Field Rink • Williamstown, Massachusetts | Chapman | W 8–1 | 3–4–0 |
| February 5 | Amherst* | Weston Field Rink • Williamstown, Massachusetts | Chapman | W 12–1 | 4–4–0 |
*Non-conference game.

Note: Yale and Williams have the scores for the games on December 29 and 30 reversed with Yale reporting that the 0–3 game occurred first. Both list the games as wins for Yale.

== Scoring statistics ==
| Name | Position | Games | Goals |
|---|---|---|---|
| Francis Austin | D | 5 | - |
| Mills Baker | D | 8 | - |
| William Blaney | RW | 5 | - |
| Daniel Chapman | G | 8 | - |
| Lewis Francis | C/LW/RW | 3 | - |
| Roger Gurley | LW | 1 | - |
| Frederic Howe | D | 8 | - |
| Clinton Mason | RW | 3 | - |
| Robert Popham | LW/RW | 8 | - |
| Ebenezer Smith | D/RW | 8 | - |
| Leonard Smith | LW/RW | 8 | - |
| Harry Watkins | C | 8 | - |
| Total | | | 33 |
