= 1924–25 United States collegiate men's ice hockey season =

- Duration: December 1924– March 1925
- East Collegiate champion: Yale
- West Collegiate champion: Michigan

The 1924–25 United States collegiate men's ice hockey season was the 31st season of collegiate ice hockey in the United States.

== Regular season ==
=== Standings ===
1924–25 Eastern Collegiate ice hockey standings
	Intercollegiate							Overall					
	GP	W	L	T	Pct.	GF	GA	GP	W	L	T	GF	GA
Amherst	5	2	3	0	.400	11	24	5	2	3	0	11	24
Army	6	3	2	1	.583	16	12	7	3	3	1	16	17
Bates	7	1	6	0	.143	12	27	8	1	7	0	13	33
Boston College	2	1	1	0	.500	3	1	16	8	6	2	40	27
Boston University	11	6	4	1	.591	30	24	12	7	4	1	34	25
Bowdoin	3	2	1	0	.667	10	7	4	2	2	0	12	13
Clarkson	4	0	4	0	.000	2	31	6	0	6	0	9	46
Colby	3	0	3	0	.000	0	16	4	0	4	0	1	20
Cornell	5	1	4	0	.200	7	23	5	1	4	0	7	23
Dartmouth	–	–	–	–	–	–	–	8	4	3	1	28	12
Hamilton	–	–	–	–	–	–	–	12	8	3	1	60	21
Harvard	10	8	2	0	.800	38	20	12	8	4	0	44	34
Massachusetts Agricultural	7	2	5	0	.286	13	38	7	2	5	0	13	38
Middlebury	2	1	1	0	.500	1	8	2	1	1	0	1	8
MIT	8	2	4	2	.375	15	28	9	2	5	2	17	32
New Hampshire	3	2	1	0	.667	8	6	4	2	2	0	9	11
Princeton	9	3	6	0	.333	27	24	17	8	9	0	59	54
Rensselaer	4	2	2	0	.500	19	7	4	2	2	0	19	7
Syracuse	1	1	0	0	1.000	3	1	4	1	3	0	6	13
Union	4	1	3	0	.250	8	22	4	1	3	0	8	22
Williams	7	3	4	0	.429	26	17	8	4	4	0	33	19
Yale	13	11	1	1	.885	46	12	16	14	1	1	57	16

1924–25 Western Collegiate ice hockey standings
	Intercollegiate							Overall					
	GP	W	L	T	Pct.	GF	GA	GP	W	L	T	GF	GA
Carleton	4	3	1	0	.750	11	9	4	3	1	0	11	9
Hamline	2	0	2	0	.000	1	8	2	0	2	0	1	8
Macalester	4	2	2	0	.500	9	9	6	3	3	0	15	14
Marquette	2	0	2	0	.000	0	5	3	1	2	0	1	5
Michigan	–	–	–	–	–	–	–	6	4	1	1	12	6
Michigan Agricultural	–	–	–	–	–	–	–	1	0	1	0	3	6
Michigan College of Mines	0	0	0	0	–	0	0	6	2	4	0	12	18
Minnesota	–	–	–	–	–	–	–	10	8	1	1	18	4
Notre Dame	3	0	2	1	.167	3	6	4	0	2	2	5	8
St. Thomas	2	1	0	1	.750	9	3	2	1	0	1	9	3
USC	–	–	–	–	–	–	–	–	–	–	–	–	–
Wisconsin	–	–	–	–	–	–	–	9	1	7	1	6	14

1924–25 Triangular Hockey League standings
	Conference								Overall					
	GP	W	L	T	PTS	SW	GF	GA	GP	W	L	T	GF	GA
Yale *	5	4	1	0	.800	2	13	5	16	14	1	1	57	16
Harvard	5	3	2	0	.600	1	14	12	12	8	4	0	44	34
Princeton	4	0	4	0	.000	0	6	16	17	8	9	0	59	54
* indicates conference champion

1924–25 Western Intercollegiate Hockey League standings
	Conference							Overall					
	GP	W	L	T	Pct.	GF	GA	GP	W	L	T	GF	GA
Michigan *	4	3	0	1	.875	5	1	6	4	1	1	12	6
Minnesota	6	4	1	1	.750	9	3	10	8	1	1	18	4
Wisconsin	6	0	6	0	.000	1	11	9	1	7	1	6	14
* indicates conference champion
