= 1924–25 Yale Bulldogs men's ice hockey season =

College ice hockey season

Eastern Collegiate, Champion Triangular League, Champion
- Conference: 1st THL
- Home ice: Woodbridge Rink

Record
- Overall: 14–1–1
- Conference: 4–1–0
- Home: 1–0–1
- Road: 7–1–0
- Neutral: 6–0–0

Coaches and captains
- Head coach: Clarence Wanamaker
- Assistant coaches: Holcomb York
- Captain: Alston Jenkins

The 1924–25 Yale Bulldogs men's ice hockey season was the 30th season of play for the program. The Bulldogs represented Yale University and were coached by Clarence Wanamaker in his 4th season.

== Season ==
Before the season even began, hopes of the team repeating their championship performance were dealt a blow when the New Haven Arena burned down. Without their home of several years, the Bulldog leadership got together and arranged a plan to help the team remain together. Thankfully, rival club Princeton was willing to help and allowed Yale the use of their home venue, the Hobey Baker Memorial Rink, twice a week for practices until the Christmas break. Initially, the plan was to then move practices to Bishop's Pond in nearby Woodbridge, Connecticut but the weather would have the ultimate say on that idea. In any event, due to a lack of a home rink, the team would spend most of the season on the road.

When the team gathered for its first on-ice meeting in early December, they were already dealing with injuries. Two players, Cottle and Scott, had been injured during the football season and were unable to participate. In spite of the problems, the Bulldogs took the defense of their title seriously and dealt with the setbacks as best they could. By the time the winter break rolled around, the team had coalesced into a solid unit and were gearing up for a busy holiday. Before kicking off their extended road trip, the team's first game came against Kent School and they got a surprisingly tough fight from the prep schoolers. Regulation ended 0–0 and necessitated overtime, fortunately the Bulldog's depth allowed them to score three times in the extra 5 minutes and capture their first win of the year. While the game was a near disaster, it did give the team their first glimpse of future Bulldog star, Ding Palmer.

On Boxing Day, the team gathered in New York City to take a night train northwest to Lake Placid. The Bulldogs were put through their paces by Williams in three games but came out as the victor each time. Though the Ephs seemed to stronger with each contest, Yale was able to use their superior numbers and teamwork to hold off the purple attack. After a day of rest, the team then headed out to Pittsburgh for a pair of matches against Queen's. Despite the perceived superiority of their northern counterparts, Yale was again victorious in their games. While the Canadians grew more physical as the series progressed, Yale kept to their game and finished their road trip with an unblemished mark.

By this time, the starting line of Scott, Turnbull and Ferguson was a well-oiled machine but it was the team's defense that carried them to victory. Potts and Sargent were a nearly impenetrable duo on the blue line and whatever got past them was usually halted by team captain Alston Jenkins. The team routinely used several alternates to keep its starters fresh but also allowed the replacements to get significant playing time and get up to speed as well. The crammed session of games appeared to put the team in good standing because they were able to shutout the Tigers in their first conference game of the year. The Bulldogs took a bit of a breather in their next match which was also their first pseudo-home game of the year. The temperature had dropped low enough for the Woodbridge plan to work and the Elis enjoyed a relaxing evening at the expense of the Mass Aggies. The team won handily and did not even miss Ferguson, who was out with an injury. Lawrence Noble replaced him at the start of the match but the score was so lopsided that Yale was able to use all of its alternates after jumping out to a 7–0 lead by the end of the first period.

While the team was undefeated to that point in the season, arch-rival Harvard was next up and were expected to give the Elis their biggest test of the season. Despite being played in Boston, the game was marred by poor ice and slowed down the pace of play. The sad state of the rink affected both teams but did not stop Yale from getting two separate 1-goal leads. Unfortunately, Harvard was able to answer both times and the Elis had to rely on stellar play from Jenkins to stay in the match. Eventually the game was sent into overtime and Harvard got a glorious opportunity about half-way in. Crimson winger Austin broke in on the Bulldog cage while Jenkins charged out to meet him. A quick shot was partially stopped by the Yale netminder but the puck squirted between his pads and slid towards the goal. While the on-ice referee ruled that the puck had not completely crossed the line before being cleared away, the goal judge overruled the ref and credited Harvard with what turned out to be the game-winner. The Elis were forced to stew over the loss for a couple of weeks as the exam break had arrived and they did not play again until February. Unfortunately, by this time the weather had warmed and Bishop's pond had turned into a slushy quagmire. The ice was so bad that both teams agreed to only play two periods and neither was able to score. Jenkins was credited with a tremendous performance despite the conditions. Less than a week later, the two met for a rematch in Hanover and Yale's stingy defense enabled the Elis to take the game with a few quick passing plays.

As the season was beginning to wind down, Yale had to abandon any hope of playing at home and the remainder of their games were all on the road. After a very close win over Boston University, the Bulldogs got their rematch with Harvard. Yale had to win the game in order to have any hope for a league title. However, just before the game, Alston Jenkins was taken ill and had to be replaced in goal by Ives. This disaster led many to believe Harvard would win the game, not least of which because the Crimson had also dropped BU by a score of 6–1. Defying expectations, the entire team rallied behind Ives and acting-captain Henry Scott and put forth possibly their best performance of the season. Scott opened the scoring in the first while the defense held Harvard back. The two teams exchanged goals in the second, leaving Yale with the lead at the beginning of the final frame. Sargent scored his second marker early in the third and precipitated a desperate attempt by Harvard to tie the score. The Crimson managed to get one with about 3 minutes remaining but Yale held on to win 3–2 and force a rubber match later in the year.

Ives continued his inspired play by shutting out MIT in the next game but was replaced as soon as Jenkins was well again. The switch saw no drop in play as the team's captain blanked Princeton for the second tine that year, setting the team up for the deciding match with Harvard. Entering the game, both Harvard and Yale were undefeated against all other collegiate opponents. This meant that the winner of the game would be declared as the eastern champions. Throughout the match, both teams demonstrated staunch defensive play with both forward units being unable to get anything into the nets. The match was typified by reliable back-checking from the Harvard skaters and stellar defensive play from Jenkins. As the game wore on the ice grew rough and several otherwise glorious opportunities were squandered. The result was a 0–0 score after 60 minutes and the two prepared for overtime. Rough play in the first extra period led Scott to be removed due to a knee injury and Cotter took his place for the remainder of the match. The physicality continued until Harvard's Chase was given a penalty for checking Turnbull into the boards but the Elis were unable to capitalize on their advantage. After the second 5-minute overtime, the two headed into a sudden-death period that would, presumably, last until one team scored. Luckily for the Elis, Harrison Turnbull gathered the puck in his own end and skated nearly the length of the ice, weaving through the entire Harvard team, before firing a clean shot to win the game and the Championship for Yale.

J. H. P. Gould served as team manager with W. H. West Jr. as his assistant.

== Roster ==
No.	Nat.	Player	Class	Pos	Height	Weight	DoB	Hometown	Previous team
	(United States)	Horace W. Cole	Junior	D/LW				Hyde Park, Massachusetts
	(United States)	Edmund P. Cottle	Junior	LW/RW				Buffalo, New York
	(United States)	William H. Cushing	Sophomore					Baltimore, Maryland
	(United States)	Benjamin C. Cutler	Junior	D			1904-07-19	Winchester, Massachusetts
	(United States)	Stephen G. Farrington	Senior	LW			1904-02-20	Yonkers, New York
	(United States)	Samuel Ferguson Jr.	Junior	C				Greenwich, Connecticut
	(United States)	Harrison C. Freeman						Hartford, Connecticut
	(United States)	John T. M. Frey	Sophomore	C/RW			1904-10-12	Brooklyn, New York
		Gillespie
		John A. Herrman	Sophomore
	(United States)	Kenneth W. Ives	Junior	G			1904-05-21	Albany, New York
	(United States)	G. Alston Jenkins	Senior	G				Stamford, Connecticut
	(United States)	Alfred D. Lindley	Junior	D/F			1904-01-20	Paxton, Nebraska
	(United States)	Lawrence M. Noble	Sophomore	C/LW/RW			1903-12-11	Monroe, Michigan
		D. L. Norris	Sophomore
	(United States)	Frederick A. Potts II	Junior	D				New York, New York
	(United States)	Frederick F. Robinson	Sophomore	LW				Watertown, New York
	(United States)	Thomas D. Sargent	Senior	D			1901-12-30	New Haven, Connecticut
	(United States)	Henry C. Scott	Senior	LW/RW				New York, New York
	(United States)	A. Varick Stout	Junior					New York, New York
	(United States)	Harrison F. Turnbull	Senior	LW				Hartford, Connecticut

== Standings ==
1924–25 Eastern Collegiate ice hockey standings
	Intercollegiate							Overall					
	GP	W	L	T	Pct.	GF	GA	GP	W	L	T	GF	GA
Amherst	5	2	3	0	.400	11	24	5	2	3	0	11	24
Army	6	3	2	1	.583	16	12	7	3	3	1	16	17
Bates	7	1	6	0	.143	12	27	8	1	7	0	13	33
Boston College	2	1	1	0	.500	3	1	16	8	6	2	40	27
Boston University	11	6	4	1	.591	30	24	12	7	4	1	34	25
Bowdoin	3	2	1	0	.667	10	7	4	2	2	0	12	13
Clarkson	4	0	4	0	.000	2	31	6	0	6	0	9	46
Colby	3	0	3	0	.000	0	16	4	0	4	0	1	20
Cornell	5	1	4	0	.200	7	23	5	1	4	0	7	23
Dartmouth	–	–	–	–	–	–	–	8	4	3	1	28	12
Hamilton	–	–	–	–	–	–	–	12	8	3	1	60	21
Harvard	10	8	2	0	.800	38	20	12	8	4	0	44	34
Massachusetts Agricultural	7	2	5	0	.286	13	38	7	2	5	0	13	38
Middlebury	2	1	1	0	.500	1	8	2	1	1	0	1	8
MIT	8	2	4	2	.375	15	28	9	2	5	2	17	32
New Hampshire	3	2	1	0	.667	8	6	4	2	2	0	9	11
Princeton	9	3	6	0	.333	27	24	17	8	9	0	59	54
Rensselaer	4	2	2	0	.500	19	7	4	2	2	0	19	7
Syracuse	1	1	0	0	1.000	3	1	4	1	3	0	6	13
Union	4	1	3	0	.250	8	22	4	1	3	0	8	22
Williams	7	3	4	0	.429	26	17	8	4	4	0	33	19
Yale	13	11	1	1	.885	46	12	16	14	1	1	57	16

1924–25 Triangular Hockey League standings
	Conference								Overall					
	GP	W	L	T	PTS	SW	GF	GA	GP	W	L	T	GF	GA
Yale *	5	4	1	0	.800	2	13	5	16	14	1	1	57	16
Harvard	5	3	2	0	.600	1	14	12	12	8	4	0	44	34
Princeton	4	0	4	0	.000	0	6	16	17	8	9	0	59	54
* indicates conference champion

== Schedule and results ==
Date	Opponent	Site	Result	Record
Regular Season
December 20	vs. Kent School*	Hobey Baker Memorial Rink • Princeton, New Jersey	W 3–0 ^{OT}	1–0–0
December 29	vs. Williams*	Lake Placid Rink • Lake Placid, New York	W 6–2	2–0–0
December 30	vs. Williams*	Lake Placid Rink • Lake Placid, New York	W 2–0	3–0–0
December 31	vs. Williams*	Lake Placid Rink • Lake Placid, New York	W 3–2	4–0–0
January 2	vs. Queen's*	Duquesne Garden • Pittsburgh, Pennsylvania	W 3–1	5–0–0
January 3	vs. Queen's*	Duquesne Garden • Pittsburgh, Pennsylvania	W 5–3	6–0–0
January 10	at Princeton	Hobey Baker Memorial Rink • Princeton, New Jersey	W 4–0	7–0–0 (1–0–0)
January 14	Massachusetts Agricultural	Bishops Pond • Woodbridge, Connecticut	W 12–1	8–0–0
January 17	at Harvard	Boston Arena • Boston, Massachusetts (Rivalry)	L 2–3 ^{OT}	8–1–0 (1–1–0)
February 2	Dartmouth*	Bishops Pond • Woodbridge, Connecticut	T 0–0 ^{†}	8–1–1
February 7	at Dartmouth*	Occom Pond • Hanover, New Hampshire	W 3–1	9–1–1
February 11	at Boston University*	Boston Arena • Boston, Massachusetts	W 2–1	10–1–1
February 14	at Harvard	Boston Arena • Boston, Massachusetts (Rivalry)	W 3–2	11–1–1 (2–1–0)
February 18	at MIT*	Boston Arena • Boston, Massachusetts	W 4–0	12–1–1
February 21	at Princeton	Hobey Baker Memorial Rink • Princeton, New Jersey	W 3–0	13–1–1 (3–1–0)
February 25	at Harvard	Boston Arena • Boston, Massachusetts (Rivalry)	W 1–0 ^{3OT}	14–1–1 (4–1–0)
*Non-conference game.

† Game limited to two 20-minute periods due to poor ice conditions.
Note: Yale's contemporary classification of their games as 'practice' or 'exhibition is misleading. The program referred to any contest before or during the winter break as such despite being official matches.
