= 1925–26 Yale Bulldogs men's ice hockey season =

College ice hockey season

- Conference: 3rd THL
- Home ice: Madison Square Garden

Record
- Overall: 4–9–1
- Conference: 0–4–0
- Home: 2–3–0
- Road: 1–4–0
- Neutral: 1–2–1

Coaches and captains
- Head coach: Clarence Wanamaker
- Captain: Frederick Potts

The 1925–26 Yale Bulldogs men's ice hockey season was the 31st season of play for the program. The Bulldogs represented Yale University and were coached by Clarence Wanamaker in his 5th season.

== Season ==
While the team was coming off its second consecutive collegiate championship, the Bulldogs were still without a home. Plans for a replacement ice hockey rink in New Haven were put on hold when the replacement project went bankrupt. After last season's debacle with the Woodbridge Rink, Yale managed to arrange a deal with the operators of Madison Square Garden to use the large venue for the team's home games. the Elis' history of playing in New York City as well as a sizable contingent of alumni in the area likely made the prospect amenable despite the fact that Yale still had ice hockey classified as a minor sport. Similar to the year before, a few Bulldogs were already dealing with injuries from their time on the football team as Cutler was out with a knee injury while Noble was nursing a bum ankle.

While the team had to contend with the loss of their star goaltender, the '26 squad knew that they had a capable understudy coming into the season. The bigger question mark was who would replace the two starting wingers who were now lost through graduation. The Elis were again allowed to use the Hobey Baker Memorial Rink as a practice facility prior to the winter break and were gearing up for a 4-game series with Williams up in Lake Placid. Cutler was still out with his ailment but Noble had recovered in time for the first game with the Ephs. The team played its first match just before New Year's and while their defense was still formidable, the offense was lacking. John Frey kicked off the scoring but the Elis were unable to summon up any further goals and fell to the purple 1–3. Yale performed better in the second match and despite losing Cole to a foot injury, were able to even the series. The third game was a close affair and the team was further degraded as Stout was playing through a cold. Even with that handicap the Bulldogs finished regulation in a tie. Ordinarily an overtime session would have been played but it was called off due to the onset of darkness. That left the fourth and final game as the deciding factor between the two teams. Yale attacked the Williams cage repeatedly but could get nothing past Chapman, instead, the Ephs' only goal from Popham gave them the victory.

The early losses made it unlikely that Yale could win a third consecutive championship, however, the team had little time to lick its wounds and the Elis found themselves on a train to Cleveland immediately after their 4th game. With little time to rest, the team took on the Cleveland Collegians, an amalgamation of former college players who were living in the region. The team was captained by former Bulldog David Ingalls and fell to the Elis, allowing the team to climb back up to .500. Two days later, Yale played its first game at Madison Square Garden against a vaunted McGill team. The Eli's oppressive defense led them to victory and gave hope to the fans that the early-season troubles were over.

The team had some time off before their next match and tried to sort out its offense. Stout was inserted as a starting winger instead of an injured Frey, however, all of their plans had to be thrown out as soon as the game started because Cottle broke a rib at the start of the game. The loss of both their starting wingers put Yale on the back foot and left the team unable to solve the Dartmouth defense. Near the end of the match, starting center Sam Ferguson was forced out with a knee injury, curtailing any real chance at a late tying goal. Cottle was able to return for the next game but Cole went back on the shelf, leaving the team without half of its starters. Even then the Elis gave Princeton a fight but couldn't overcome a sluggish start that saw them surrender a pair of goals in each of the first two periods. Frey got into the game in the latter stages, scoring the first goal for the Elis, but it was too little to late for the Bulldogs.

Yale got a bit of a reprieve and had a week and a half before their next match, giving the players some time to recover from their various injuries. While Ferguson was still out, Cole returned while Frey had seemingly fully recovered and was again a starting winger. The nearly-whole Elis swamped New York A. C. with Wheelock earning the shutout in place of Ives.

After the exam break, the team returned with a rematch against Dartmouth. Wheelock was again starring in goal and had the Elis ahead by a single goal in the later part of the third period before the Indians finally broke through and opposing captain Manser notched a hat-trick in about 6 minutes to steal the game from Yale. The continued lack of scoring and practice time did not set the team up well for their showdown with Harvard, who were looking for revenge after missing out on the title the year before. Coach Wanamaker seemingly tried every lineup combination he could but nothing was able to get through the stingy Crimson defense and Harvard skated to a comfortable win.

After a loss to the George Owen-led Boston A. A. squad, Yale ended it season attempting to win at least one of the Triangular League series. First up was the Princeton rematch, and while the team was at its full complement of players, the Elis didn't have much practice time beforehand. Frey got an early goal but Princeton answered quickly. The rest of the game saw several opportunities but neither netminder gave in. Overtime was needed but it too was scoreless until just before the full 5 minutes had elapsed when Princeton's Hallock notched his second of the match.

Coming into the final game against Harvard, Yale had little to play for other than pride, but that didn't stop some 11,000 fans from attending. The Elis played as they had done all season, solid defensively but unable to generate much offence. The game was closely contested throughput, but Yale could not get past the Harvard defense and were shut out for the second time for season. While injuries and limited ice time were primary factors in the team's struggles, Yale still finished with its worst record in over 20 years.

W. H. West Jr. served as team manager with G. H. Walker as his assistant.

== Roster ==
No.	Nat.	Player	Class	Pos	Height	Weight	DoB	Hometown	Previous team
	(United States)	Horace W. Cole	Senior	D				Hyde Park, Massachusetts
	(United States)	Edmund P. Cottle Jr.	Senior	LW				Buffalo, New York
	(United States)	William H. Cushing	Junior					Baltimore, Maryland
	(United States)	Benjamin C. Cutler	Senior	C/RW			1904-07-19	Winchester, Massachusetts
	(United States)	Samuel Ferguson Jr.	Senior	C				Greenwich, Connecticut
	(United States)	John T. M. Frey	Junior	RW			1904-10-12	Brooklyn, New York
		John A. Herrman	Sophomore
	(United States)	Richard M. Hurd Jr.	Sophomore					New York, New York
	(United States)	Kenneth W. Ives	Senior	G			1904-05-21	Albany, New York
	(United States)	Lawrence M. Noble	Junior	LW/D			1903-12-11	Monroe, Michigan
	(United States)	Frederick A. Potts II (C)	Senior	D				New York, New York
		Sidney S. Quarrier	Sophomore	C/D
	(United States)	Frederick F. Robinson	Junior	LW				Watertown, New York
		Joseph Roby Jr.	Sophomore
	(United States)	A. Varick Stout	Senior	RW				New York, New York
	(United States)	Richard F. Vaughan	Sophomore	C				Rock, Wisconsin
		Joseph A. Wheelock	Junior	G

== Standings ==
1925–26 Eastern Collegiate ice hockey standings
	Intercollegiate							Overall					
	GP	W	L	T	Pct.	GF	GA	GP	W	L	T	GF	GA
Amherst	7	1	4	2	.286	11	28	7	1	4	2	11	28
Army	8	3	5	0	.375	14	23	9	3	6	0	17	30
Bates	9	3	5	1	.389	18	37	9	3	5	1	18	37
Boston College	3	2	1	0	.667	9	5	15	6	8	1	46	54
Boston University	11	7	4	0	.636	28	11	15	7	8	0	31	28
Bowdoin	6	4	2	0	.667	18	13	7	4	3	0	18	18
Clarkson	5	2	3	0	.400	10	13	8	4	4	0	25	25
Colby	5	0	4	1	.100	9	18	6	1	4	1	–	–
Cornell	6	2	4	0	.333	10	21	6	2	4	0	10	21
Dartmouth	–	–	–	–	–	–	–	15	12	3	0	72	34
Hamilton	–	–	–	–	–	–	–	10	7	3	0	–	–
Harvard	9	8	1	0	.889	34	13	11	8	3	0	38	20
Massachusetts Agricultural	8	3	4	1	.438	10	20	8	3	4	1	10	20
Middlebury	8	5	3	0	.625	19	16	8	5	3	0	19	16
MIT	9	3	6	0	.333	16	32	9	3	6	0	16	32
New Hampshire	3	1	2	0	.333	5	7	7	1	6	0	11	29
Norwich	–	–	–	–	–	–	–	2	1	1	0	–	–
Princeton	8	5	3	0	.625	21	25	16	7	9	0	44	61
Rensselaer	–	–	–	–	–	–	–	6	2	4	0	–	–
Saint Michael's	–	–	–	–	–	–	–	–	–	–	–	–	–
St. Lawrence	2	0	2	0	.000	1	4	2	0	2	0	1	4
Syracuse	6	2	2	2	.500	8	7	7	3	2	2	10	7
Union	6	2	3	1	.417	18	24	6	2	3	1	18	24
Vermont	4	1	3	0	.250	18	11	5	2	3	0	20	11
Williams	15	10	4	1	.700	59	23	18	12	5	1	72	28
Yale	10	1	8	1	.150	9	23	14	4	9	1	25	30

1925–26 Triangular Hockey League standings
	Conference								Overall					
	GP	W	L	T	PTS	SW	GF	GA	GP	W	L	T	GF	GA
Harvard *	4	4	0	0	1.000	2	14	6	11	8	3	0	38	20
Princeton	4	2	2	0	.500	1	12	11	16	7	9	0	44	61
Yale	4	0	4	0	.000	0	3	12	14	4	9	1	25	30
* indicates conference champion

== Schedule and results ==
Date	Opponent	Site	Result	Record
Regular Season
December 29	vs. Williams*	Lake Placid Rink • Lake Placid, New York	L 1–3	0–1–0
December 30	vs. Williams*	Lake Placid Rink • Lake Placid, New York	W 3–2	1–1–0
December 31	vs. Williams*	Lake Placid Rink • Lake Placid, New York	T 1–1	1–1–1
January 1	vs. Williams*	Lake Placid Rink • Lake Placid, New York	L 0–1	1–2–1
January 2	at Cleveland Collegians*	Elysium Arena • Cleveland, Ohio	W 4–2	2–2–1
January 4	McGill*	Madison Square Garden • Manhattan, New York	W 3–1	3–2–1
January 12	Dartmouth*	Madison Square Garden • Manhattan, New York	L 0–1	3–3–1
January 16	Princeton	Madison Square Garden • Manhattan, New York	L 2–4	3–4–1 (0–1–0)
January 27	New York A. C.*	Madison Square Garden • Manhattan, New York	W 6–0	4–4–1
February 6	at Dartmouth*	Occom Pond • Hanover, New Hampshire	L 1–3	4–5–1
February 13	at Harvard	Boston Arena • Boston, Massachusetts (Rivalry)	L 0–4	4–6–1 (0–2–0)
February 19	at Boston A. A.*	Boston Arena • Boston, Massachusetts	L 3–4	4–7–1
February 22	at Princeton	Hobey Baker Memorial Rink • Princeton, New Jersey	L 1–2 ^{2OT}	4–8–1 (0–3–0)
February 27	Harvard	Madison Square Garden • Manhattan, New York (Rivalry)	L 0–2	4–9–1 (0–4–0)
*Non-conference game.

Note: Yale's contemporary classification of their games as 'practice' or 'exhibition is misleading. The program referred to any contest before or during the winter break as such despite being official matches.
