= 1922–23 Dartmouth Indians men's ice hockey season =

- Conference: Independent
- Home ice: Occom Pond

Record
- Overall: 13–2–0
- Home: 2–0–0
- Road: 8–2–0
- Neutral: 3–0–0

Coaches and captains
- Head coach: Leon Tuck
- Captain: James Osborne

The 1922–23 Dartmouth Indians men's ice hockey season was the 17th season of play for the program. The Indians were coached by Leon Tuck in his 2nd season.

== Season ==
After narrowly missing out on a championship in 1922, Dartmouth entered this season looking to finally claim a title. In order to prevent one of the biggest problems from reoccurring, the team scheduled most of their games to be on the road as Occom Pond could not be counted on for consistent ice. Leon Tuck returned as coach after a year's absence and found a roster waiting for him that was already well experienced. While the Indians lost a few players to graduation, they got a boost from the return of Lloyd Neidlinger, who had been the starting goaltender in '21. The biggest problem was the ineligibility of Colder and Hall who would not be able to return to the team until at least February.

The team opened the season against Columbia at Lake Placid. The Greens found themselves in a tough fight at times but overall they proved that they were the better team. Dartmouth swept the three-game series and then took a week break over Christmas. The players then travelled to Buffalo for a two-game series with the Nichols Hockey Club. The Green found the semi-pros to be a stronger opponent than Columbia but were still able to keep their record spotless.

A few weeks later, the team was back on the road to New York for a pair of matches. After a relatively easy win over Hamilton, the Indians were stunned by the pushback they received from Cornell. Despite this being the Big Red's first game of the season, the typically weak squad fought hard against the undefeated greens. Goals from Sheehy and Foster were swiftly matched by the Cornell and regulation ended in a tie. Team captain Osborne made sure that Dartmouth would not lose its perfect record to the Reds with the first goal in overtime. Sheehy's second a few minutes later made sure that Dartmouth would return home with the record unblemished.

The team's narrow escape apparently did nothing to prepare them for their next match the following week because the Indians found themselves down by 4 goals midway through the second period. Dartmouth got off to a poor start in the match, allowing 3 goals to Williams in the first minutes of the game. Foster cut into the lead before the end of the period but that still left the Greens down by a pair. The sluggish play continued in the middle period and two more goals from the Purple made the game's result almost inevitable. However, the 5th goal from Williams appeared to light a fire under the team and Dartmouth began to resemble the dominant team that warranted their record. Sheehy, Lyon and Osborne all tallied before the end of the second to shrink the deficit to 1. Both defenses tightened in the third period and only one goal was scored. Fortunately for Dartmouth, it was Sheehy's second goal of the game and the two would need overtime to settle matters. Two 5-minute overtimes resulted in no further scoring so a third, sudden death period of 15 minutes (maximum) was adopted. About halfway through the third extra period, Foster fired the puck from center ice which then deflected off of Osborne's shoulder into the net, giving Dartmouth one of the most dramatic victories in its history.

Dartmouth had a few week off before the next game in which to relax and they returned against Massachusetts Agricultural with a more determined game. Playing at home for the first time, the team was able to demonstrate that they were worth of their undefeated record. The Aggies got on the scoresheet first but then Dartmouth's superior experience and training led them to take over for the rest of the game. Four different players joined in to score 5 goals for the Indians. The team was in such control that coach Tuck was able to let Ed Learnard get a turn in goal. With 9 wins already under its belt, Dartmouth headed south for the big showdown with Yale. Though the Elis were already out of the running for an intercollegiate title, they were still a dangerous team. Luckily, both Colder and Hall were now able to play for the Indians once more and the two were needed against a very fast Bulldog sextet. Yale opened the scoring early but, despite furious attempts by both teams, neither was able to score in the next 20 minutes. Sheehy finally tied the score in the second and, after the Elis regained the lead, Lyons potted two more before the period was over to give his team a 1-goal edge. The third saw Yale put all of their skaters on the offense but the Greens held and skated away with a 3–2 victory.

On the way back to Hanover, Dartmouth played Army in New York. Following their tenth win of the season, Dartmouth lost to Army, who shut out the team. Army scored one goal during the game. Because Dartmouth had games remaining against two other championship contenders on its schedule, the team could still secure the intercollegiate title but required wins in both remaining matchups.

The second and final home game of the year came against MIT. Just like the first, the Indians were no match for their opponent and Dartmouth was able to set a new program record with its 11th win of the year. After a week off to catch their breath, the team returned with a match against St. Paul's School. Despite being one of the top prep teams in the country, the teenagers were hopelessly outmatched by Dartmouth and gave the Indians their biggest win on the season. A few days later, Dartmouth headed south for the first of two games that would conceivably decide the championship. First up was Harvard and the three-time defending intercollegiate champions were loath to give up their crown. The two juggernauts fought a defensive battle with Harvard platooning wave after wave of fresh troops against Dartmouth to overwhelm the visitors. Dartmouth absorbed the attack and then countered with a single goal. Neidlinger and the defense made sure that lone tally held up and Dartmouth exorcised the Crimson demon, giving the Greens their first win over Harvard since 1915.

At 13–1, Dartmouth only had Princeton left on its schedule. Though the Tigers were having a bit of a renaissance season, they had lost twice to Harvard in the interim and were no longer in competition for the intercollegiate title. The only thing that Princeton could do in their final match was ruin Dartmouth's chances for the Indians' first title. Similar to the Harvard game, the two teams began with a defensive struggle that was vitally important for Dartmouth as Neidlinger was unavailable for the match and Learnard replaced him as the starting netminder. Dartmouth played a fairly rough game and was whistled for several penalties in the first two periods, however, rather than cost the Indians, the aggressive style put Princeton on the defensive and enabled Dartmouth to get a lead. The Greens did what they could to make Perry's goal early in the second stand up like that had against Harvard. Unfortunately, Princeton's offense fought back in the third. Less than a minute into the final frame, the score was tied and that caused Dartmouth to cease its overly-physical play. With the extra space needed, the Princeton forwards scored twice in the second half of the period and then played a 5-man defense over the last few minutes. Dartmouth was caught off-guard by the sudden turn of evens and the Indians were unable to mount a comeback.

The loss to Princeton was akin to a torpedo in the side of Dartmouth's championship hopes. While the Indians still had wins over Harvard and Yale, they did not have a match with the other team vying for the title: Boston College. BC had an undefeated record against intercollegiate opponents but they had only played 5 games and had not faced any of the ivies during the season. Unfortunately for Dartmouth, the two did have several opponents in common. Both had defeated the Nichols Hockey Club twice; both had shut out wins over MIT; both had sizable road victories at Hamilton. However, while Dartmouth had lost to Army, BC had smashed the Cadets 9–1 and finished the year with one loss to a western semi-pro team. In spite of the otherwise glorious season, Dartmouth would have to settle for second place once more.

== Roster ==
No.	Nat.	Player	Class	Pos	Height	Weight	DoB	Hometown	Previous team
	(United States)	Charles A. Colder	Senior	C/LW			1901-05-25	Cleveland, Ohio
	(United States)	Morton W. Fletcher	Senior	RW			1901-08-27	Greenfield, New Hampshire
	(United States)	John E. Foster	Senior	D			1900-06-28	Montclair, New Jersey
	(United States)	Edward R. Furey	Senior	LW			1897-05-10	New York, New York
	(United States)	Robert B. Hall	Junior	C/LW	5' 8" (1.73 m)	165 lb (75 kg)	1899-10-13	Oak Park, Illinois	Brooklyn Crescents
	(United States)	Edward H. Learnard	Junior	G			1902-12-19	Brighton, Massachusetts
	(United States)	Stanley H. Lyon	Junior	D/F			1903-02-05	Dorchester, Massachusetts
	(United States)	Lloyd K. Neidlinger	Senior	G			1901-12-23	Brooklyn, New York
	(United States)	James M. Osborne (C)	Senior	LW/RW			1901-05-09	Cleveland, Ohio
	(United States)	David A. Perry	Junior	D/F			1902-03-12	Sharon, Massachusetts
	(United States)	Francis E. Sheehy	Junior	C/LW			1902-04-16	Roxbury, Massachusetts
	(United States)	James B. Sly	Junior	C			1901-09-16	Elmira, New York

== Standings ==
1922–23 Eastern Collegiate ice hockey standings
	Intercollegiate							Overall					
	GP	W	L	T	Pct.	GF	GA	GP	W	L	T	GF	GA
Amherst	8	4	3	1	.563	15	24	8	4	3	1	15	24
Army	11	5	6	0	.455	26	35	14	7	7	0	36	39
Bates	9	6	3	0	.667	34	25	12	8	4	0	56	32
Boston College	5	5	0	0	1.000	30	6	14	12	1	1	53	18
Boston University	7	2	5	0	.286	21	22	8	2	6	0	22	26
Bowdoin	6	3	3	0	.500	18	28	9	5	4	0	37	33
Clarkson	3	1	1	1	.500	3	14	6	2	3	1	18	28
Colby	6	2	4	0	.333	15	21	6	2	4	0	15	21
Columbia	9	0	9	0	.000	14	35	9	0	9	0	14	35
Cornell	6	1	3	2	.333	6	16	6	1	3	2	6	16
Dartmouth	12	10	2	0	.833	49	20	15	13	2	0	67	26
Hamilton	7	2	5	0	.286	20	34	10	4	6	0	37	53
Harvard	10	7	3	0	.700	27	11	12	8	4	0	34	19
Maine	6	2	4	0	.333	16	23	6	2	4	0	16	23
Massachusetts Agricultural	9	3	4	2	.444	13	24	9	3	4	2	13	24
Middlebury	3	0	3	0	.000	1	6	3	0	3	0	1	6
MIT	8	3	5	0	.375	16	52	8	3	5	0	16	52
Pennsylvania	6	1	4	1	.250	8	36	7	2	4	1	11	38
Princeton	15	11	4	0	.733	84	21	18	12	5	1	93	30
Rensselaer	5	1	4	0	.200	6	23	5	1	4	0	6	23
Saint Michael's	3	1	2	0	.333	4	5	–	–	–	–	–	–
Union	0	0	0	0	–	0	0	3	2	1	0	–	–
Williams	9	5	3	1	.611	33	17	10	6	3	1	40	17
Yale	13	9	4	0	.692	70	16	15	9	6	0	75	26

== Schedule and results ==
Date	Opponent	Site	Result	Record
Regular Season
December 21	vs. Columbia*	Lake Placid Arena • Lake Placid, New York	W 2–1	1–0–0
December 22	vs. Columbia*	Lake Placid Arena • Lake Placid, New York	W 8–3	2–0–0
December 24	vs. Columbia*	Lake Placid Arena • Lake Placid, New York	W 7–0 ^{†}	3–0–0
January 1	at Nichols Hockey Club*	Broadway Auditorium • Buffalo, New York	W 5–1	4–0–0
January 2	at Nichols Hockey Club*	Broadway Auditorium • Buffalo, New York	W 3–2	5–0–0
January 12	at Hamilton*	Russell Sage Rink • Clinton, New York	W 6–2	6–0–0
January 13	at Cornell*	Beebe Lake • Ithaca, New York	W 4–2 ^{2OT}	7–0–0
January 20	at Williams*	Weston Field Rink • Williamstown, Massachusetts	W 6–5 ^{3OT}	8–0–0
February 3	Massachusetts Agricultural*	Occom Pond • Hanover, New Hampshire	W 5–1	9–0–0
February 6	at Yale*	New Haven Arena • New Haven, Connecticut	W 3–2	10–0–0
February 7	at Army*	Stuart Rink • West Point, New York	L 0–1	10–1–0
February 10	MIT*	Occom Pond • Hanover, New Hampshire	W 6–0	11–1–0
February 17	at St. Paul's School*	St. Paul's Rink • Concord, New Hampshire	W 10–3	12–1–0
February 21	at Harvard*	Boston Arena • Boston, Massachusetts	W 1–0	13–1–0
March 3	at Princeton*	Hobey Baker Memorial Rink • Princeton, New Jersey	L 1–3	13–2–0
*Non-conference game.

† Dartmouth records have the score at 0–7 while contemporary accounts list the final as 0–2.
