= 1922–23 Yale Bulldogs men's ice hockey season =

College ice hockey season

- Conference: 2nd THL
- Home ice: New Haven Arena

Record
- Overall: 9–6–0
- Conference: 3–3–0
- Home: 7–4–0
- Road: 2–1–0
- Neutral: 0–1–0

Coaches and captains
- Head coach: Clarence Wanamaker
- Assistant coaches: Holcomb York
- Captain: Joe Bulkley

The 1922–23 Yale Bulldogs men's ice hockey season was the 28th season of play for the program.

== Season ==
At the start of the season, Yale announced they would not be playing during the winter break, as they had traditionally done. Rule changes were also adopted that modified offside calls in an attempt to make them more fair and to aid the referees.

Yale played well in their opening loss to the St. Nicholas Hockey Club and, after the break, welcomed the first western team to play at the New Haven Arena. The Elis outclassed the American School of Osteopathy, and gave hope that Yale would finally be able to challenge their rival Harvard. Sure enough, in the following game Yale proved to be a match for the mighty Crimson and the defense from both teams was remarkable. Each squad was only able to muster one goal in regulation and two five-minute overtimes were required. O'Hearn scored half way through the first and it appeared that the Bulldogs might be able to take the contest. Harvard's captain, George Owen had other ideas and tied the game at 2-all with less than two minutes remaining in the second overtime. A third, sudden-death overtime was required and with both teams visibly tired Harvard's Hill notched the winning goal.

For their next game, Yale travelled south and made their first appearance at the Hobey Baker Memorial Rink, which had been completed in November. The Tigers had already produced several dominating performances and they continued their strong play against the Elis. Much of the scoring was done in the first half of the game, when both teams were still fresh. From the start of the third period both goaltenders grew stout in net, turning aside every chance that came their way. The first two 5-minute overtimes both passed without a goal being scored and Yale played their second consecutive sudden-death contest. This time it took six minutes before the final goal was scored and again Yale found itself on the wrong side.

Coming so close in both games was unfortunate for the Bulldogs but the Elis would have a second chance at both teams later in the season. Yale would have to get through a 10-day layoff first and then content with four games in 11 days. The Elis acquitted themselves well, taking three of the games and two with dominating performances. Their only loss came at the hand of an undefeated Dartmouth squad but, again, Yale's defeat was only by a single goal.

In the rematch against Princeton, Allston Jenkins did everything he could to keep the tigers from scoring and he was equaled, save-for-save by his counterpart. Neither team was able to score in regulation, or the first two overtime periods, so Yale would have to play in their third sudden-death contest of the Triangular Hockey League season. Both teams had agreed before the session started to play until one of them had scored and, after 13 minutes had elapsed, the 3,000-strong crowd witnessed the first goal of the game. Yale was finally able to capture a league game when Reid netted the winning tally.

Jenkins continued his stellar play, keeping the next two collegiate opponents from scoring as well. While the team's shutout streak was ended by the New Haven Bears, a local amateur team, they entered their rematch with Harvard full of confidence that the team was equal to the task at downing the Crimson. Jenkins was impenetrable in the contest and three goals from Eli sticks were more than enough to take the match. The win was Yale's first over Harvard since 1917 and their first win in Boston in program history.

Yale would not have long to savor the victory, as the rubber match against both Harvard and Princeton occurred during the following week. The Elis had a chance to win the Triangular League if it captured both games and both they and the Crimson fought a pitched battle on the 7th. The teams traded goals in the second period but thanks to Jenkins in net and the typically oppressive Harvard defense, neither team could score again and overtime was required once more. Both 5-minute sessions passed without incident and Yale played its fourth triple overtime of the season. Again, however, Harvard was able to outlast the Elis and take the Triangular League championship, having already defeated Princeton in their season series.

The final game would decide second place in the conference and, as they had for the bulk of the season, Yale relied on their goaltender to pull them through. Jenkins made 34 saves on the night, allowing just one goal during a raucous second period where Yale managed to find the back of the net three times, and allowed the Elis to win the game and finished the season with a 9–6 record, their best mark since the end of the war.

== Roster ==
| No. | Nat. | Player | Class | Pos | Height | Weight | DoB | Hometown | Previous team |
|---|---|---|---|---|---|---|---|---|---|
| | | Archibald Bell | Senior | G |
| | (United States) | Clifford V. Brokaw Jr. | Sophomore | G | | | 1902-01-11 | Manhattan, New York |
| | | Jonathan O. Bulkley (C) | Senior | LW |
| | | William Chisholm | Junior | LW/RW |
| | (United States) | Vincent Farnsworth Jr. | Junior | LW | | | 1901-04-11 | Revere, Massachusetts |
| | | Stephen G. Farrington | Sophomore | RW |
| | | G. Alston Jenkins | Sophomore | G |
| | (United States) | Alfred D. Lindley | Sophomore | D | | | 1904-01-20 | Paxton, Nebraska |
| | | Alfred L. Norris | Junior | D |
| | (United States) | Charles M. O'Hearn | Junior | D | | | | Brookline, Massachusetts |
| | (United States) | H. Dillingham Palmer | | LW | | | | Summit, New Jersey |
| | | Fergus Reid Jr. | Senior | C |
| | | Thomas D. Sargent | Sophomore | D | | | 1901-12-30 |
| | | Henry C. Scott | Sophomore | C |
| | | Harrison F. Turnbull | Sophomore | RW |
| | | Wayland F. Vaughan | Senior | D |

== Standings ==
1922–23 Eastern Collegiate ice hockey standings
| | Intercollegiate | | | | | | | Overall | | | | | |
| | GP | W | L | T | Pct. | GF | GA | GP | W | L | T | GF | GA |
|---|---|---|---|---|---|---|---|---|---|---|---|---|---|
| Amherst | 8 | 4 | 3 | 1 | .563 | 15 | 24 | 8 | 4 | 3 | 1 | 15 | 24 |
| Army | 11 | 5 | 6 | 0 | .455 | 26 | 35 | 14 | 7 | 7 | 0 | 36 | 39 |
| Bates | 9 | 6 | 3 | 0 | .667 | 34 | 25 | 12 | 8 | 4 | 0 | 56 | 32 |
| Boston College | 5 | 5 | 0 | 0 | 1.000 | 30 | 6 | 14 | 12 | 1 | 1 | 53 | 18 |
| Boston University | 7 | 2 | 5 | 0 | .286 | 21 | 22 | 8 | 2 | 6 | 0 | 22 | 26 |
| Bowdoin | 6 | 3 | 3 | 0 | .500 | 18 | 28 | 9 | 5 | 4 | 0 | 37 | 33 |
| Clarkson | 3 | 1 | 1 | 1 | .500 | 3 | 14 | 6 | 2 | 3 | 1 | 18 | 28 |
| Colby | 6 | 2 | 4 | 0 | .333 | 15 | 21 | 6 | 2 | 4 | 0 | 15 | 21 |
| Columbia | 9 | 0 | 9 | 0 | .000 | 14 | 35 | 9 | 0 | 9 | 0 | 14 | 35 |
| Cornell | 6 | 1 | 3 | 2 | .333 | 6 | 16 | 6 | 1 | 3 | 2 | 6 | 16 |
| Dartmouth | 12 | 10 | 2 | 0 | .833 | 49 | 20 | 15 | 13 | 2 | 0 | 67 | 26 |
| Hamilton | 7 | 2 | 5 | 0 | .286 | 20 | 34 | 10 | 4 | 6 | 0 | 37 | 53 |
| Harvard | 10 | 7 | 3 | 0 | .700 | 27 | 11 | 12 | 8 | 4 | 0 | 34 | 19 |
| Maine | 6 | 2 | 4 | 0 | .333 | 16 | 23 | 6 | 2 | 4 | 0 | 16 | 23 |
| Massachusetts Agricultural | 9 | 3 | 4 | 2 | .444 | 13 | 24 | 9 | 3 | 4 | 2 | 13 | 24 |
| Middlebury | 3 | 0 | 3 | 0 | .000 | 1 | 6 | 3 | 0 | 3 | 0 | 1 | 6 |
| MIT | 8 | 3 | 5 | 0 | .375 | 16 | 52 | 8 | 3 | 5 | 0 | 16 | 52 |
| Pennsylvania | 6 | 1 | 4 | 1 | .250 | 8 | 36 | 7 | 2 | 4 | 1 | 11 | 38 |
| Princeton | 15 | 11 | 4 | 0 | .733 | 84 | 21 | 18 | 12 | 5 | 1 | 93 | 30 |
| Rensselaer | 5 | 1 | 4 | 0 | .200 | 6 | 23 | 5 | 1 | 4 | 0 | 6 | 23 |
| Saint Michael's | 3 | 1 | 2 | 0 | .333 | 4 | 5 | – | – | – | – | – | – |
| Union | 0 | 0 | 0 | 0 | – | 0 | 0 | 3 | 2 | 1 | 0 | – | – |
| Williams | 9 | 5 | 3 | 1 | .611 | 33 | 17 | 10 | 6 | 3 | 1 | 40 | 17 |
| Yale | 13 | 9 | 4 | 0 | .692 | 70 | 16 | 15 | 9 | 6 | 0 | 75 | 26 |

1922–23 Triangular Hockey League standings
| | Conference | | | | | | | | Overall | | | | | |
| | GP | W | L | T | PTS | SW | GF | GA | GP | W | L | T | GF | GA |
|---|---|---|---|---|---|---|---|---|---|---|---|---|---|---|
| Harvard * | 6 | 4 | 2 | 0 | .667 | 2 | 9 | 10 | 12 | 8 | 4 | 0 | 34 | 19 |
| Yale | 6 | 3 | 3 | 0 | .500 | 1 | 13 | 10 | 15 | 9 | 6 | 0 | 75 | 26 |
| Princeton | 6 | 2 | 4 | 0 | .333 | 0 | 9 | 11 | 18 | 12 | 5 | 1 | 93 | 30 |
* indicates conference champion

== Schedule and results ==
| Date | Opponent | Site | Result | Record |
Regular season
| December 20 | St. Nicholas Hockey Club* | New Haven Arena • New Haven, Connecticut | L 4–5 | 0–1–0 |
| January 13 | A.T. Still* | New Haven Arena • New Haven, Connecticut | W 13–0 | 1–1–0 |
| January 20 | Harvard | New Haven Arena • New Haven, Connecticut (Rivalry) | L 2–3 ^{3OT} | 1–2–0 (0–1–0) |
| January 24 | at Princeton | Hobey Baker Memorial Rink • Princeton, New Jersey | L 3–4 ^{3OT} | 1–3–0 (0–2–0) |
| February 3 | MIT* | New Haven Arena • New Haven, Connecticut | W 6–0 | 2–3–0 |
| February 6 | Dartmouth* | New Haven Arena • New Haven, Connecticut | L 2–3 | 2–4–0 |
| February 10 | Pennsylvania* | New Haven Arena • New Haven, Connecticut | W 11–2 | 3–4–0 |
| February 14 | Massachusetts Agricultural* | New Haven Arena • New Haven, Connecticut | W 4–1 | 4–4–0 |
| February 17 | Princeton | New Haven Arena • New Haven, Connecticut | W 1–0 ^{3OT} | 5–4–0 (1–2–0) |
| February 21 | Amherst* | New Haven Arena • New Haven, Connecticut | W 13–0 | 6–4–0 |
| February 22 | vs. New Haven Bears* | New Haven Arena • New Haven, Connecticut | L 1–5 | 6–5–0 |
| February 24 | Hamilton* | New Haven Arena • New Haven, Connecticut | W 8–0 | 7–5–0 |
| March 3 | at Harvard | Boston Arena • Boston, Massachusetts (Rivalry) | W 3–0 | 8–5–0 (2–2–0) |
| March 7 | Harvard | New Haven Arena • New Haven, Connecticut (Rivalry) | L 1–2 ^{3OT} | 8–6–0 (2–3–0) |
| March 10 | at Princeton | Hobey Baker Memorial Rink • Princeton, New Jersey | W 3–1 | 9–6–0 (3–3–0) |
*Non-conference game.
