= 1925–26 Williams Ephs men's ice hockey season =

College ice hockey team season

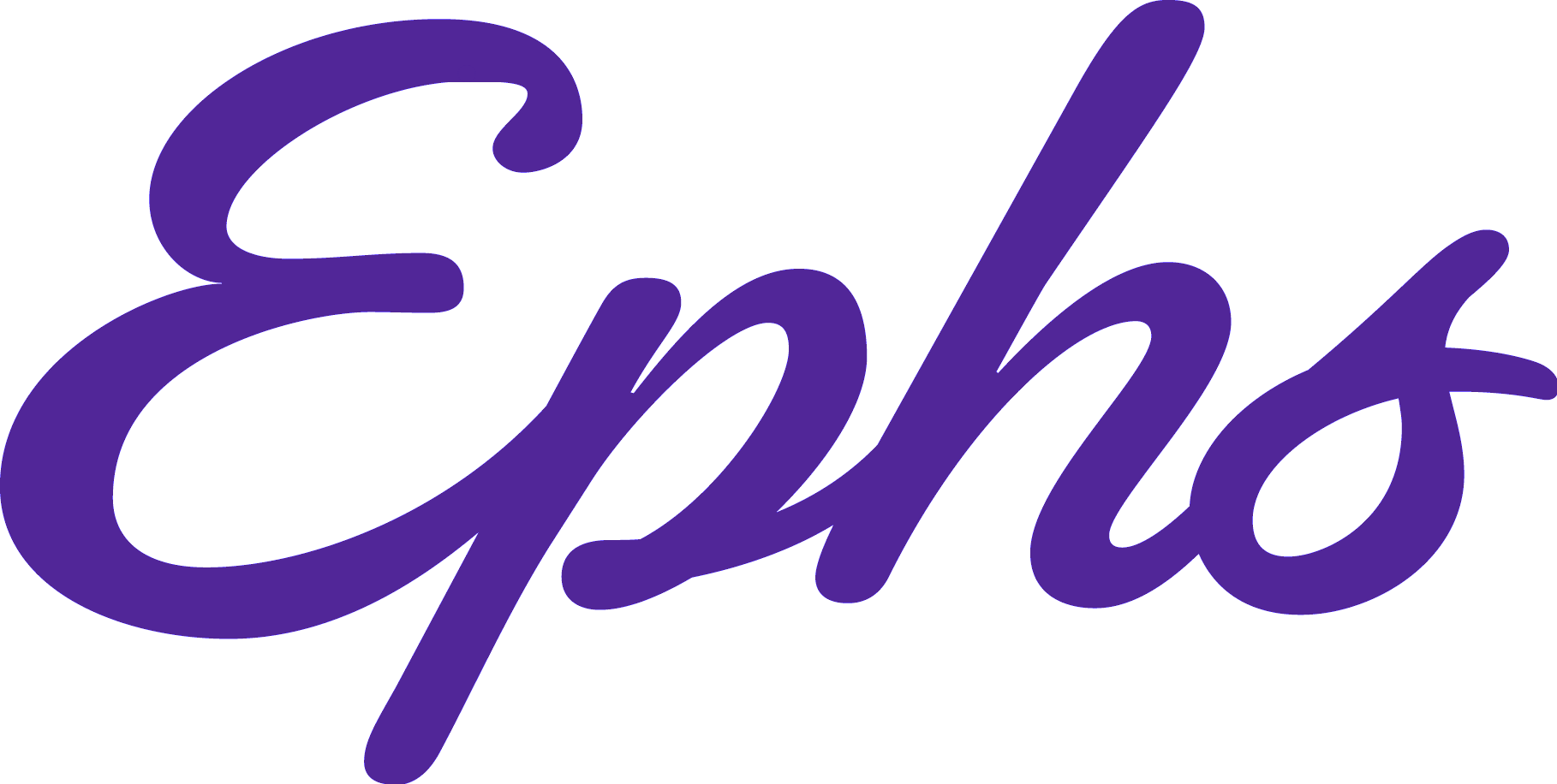
- Conference: Independent
- Home ice: Weston Field Rink; Sage Hall Rink

Record
- Overall: 12–5–1
- Home: 4–0–0
- Road: 6–2–0
- Neutral: 2–3–1

Coaches and captains
- Head coach: J. Philip Bower
- Captain: Harry Watkins

The 1925–26 Williams Ephs men's ice hockey season was the 23rd season of play for the program.

== Season ==
After the close of the football season, the first meeting was held for the ice hockey team and Williams was set up well for a good season. With just one player departing due to graduation and team captain Harry Watkins returning in the same capacity, the Ephs had a solid foundation for their '26 campaign. This was the first year in the history of the program that the club came into the year knowing who their head coach would be and Philip Bower had ample time to get his team ready. Early on, however, the pool of players was curtailed by several prospective members being academically ineligible. Blaney, Ebenezer Smith and several players who were on last year's freshman team would be unavailable to the Ephs until at least February. Fortunately, many of the team's former starters were still on hand for the start of the season. As part of the team's membership in the Intercollegiate Ice Hockey Association, Williams was able to schedule dates with all the Ivy League teams. However, due to budget constraints, they were forced to cancel the proposed match with Yale on February 10. Though disappointing, that was the most palatable solution for Williams as the team would open the season with a 4-game series against the Elis.

Due to an early chill, Williams was able to get their first on-ice practice in early December on Leake's Pond with about 40 men attending. Unfortunately, the weather did not hold and forced the team to find other means of training for over a week. They reformed to send 10 men up to Lake Placid to try and get as much practice in as possible before the matches with the Bulldogs. Watkins was back at his regular center position and flanked by Mason, Popham and Leonard Smith on the wings. Howe led the defense once more and was aided by Austin, Baker and Banks. Champman returned as the primary goaltender with Hutchins as his understudy. The hard work paid off in the first game when Williams defeated the 2-time defending Intercollegiate champions 3–1. The star of the game was Frederic Howe who, though suffering from an illness, managed to score twice. The Elis managed to brake through the Ephs' defense in the second match and evened the score with their own 3–2 win. The second game was played in a snowstorm and saw Yale get a narrow lead before Watkins tied the game after a furious attack. The weather conditions prevented the match from continuing beyond regulation but set up a deciding game on New Year's Day. Popham scored on a brilliant pass form Watkins in the second while Chapman and the defense proved to be invincible, turning aside everything the Elis could throw at them to take both the game and the series.

Williams kept rolling after their hot start in a match with the Apawamis club, easily winning 7–0, before heading to New York City to make their first appearance at Madison Square Garden. The building was brand new, having been open for just a few weeks, and the Ephs played before the largest crowd in the history of the program. Some 11,000 fans witnessed Williams take on Queen's and they were rewarded with a spectacular display of hockey. The Canadians opened the scoring but Watkins soon tied the match. After the Gaels got a second lead, Watkins scored his second goal of the game to send the match into overtime. Two 5-minute periods resulted in no further goals so another pair of overtimes was needed. Popham put the Ephs up by 1 in the third overtime but, in the longest game in the history of Williams hockey, the team was beginning to tire. After 77 minutes of ice time and few alternates used, the Ephs surrendered two goals in the final 3 minutes of the game and ended up on the losing end.

Hutchins was in goal for the team's next game, as was the second offensive unit of Mason, Austin and Banks, but little amounted from their efforts. It wasn't until the regular starters got into the game that the first goal was scored and Watkins again led the team with two of the three goals. Sticky ice slowed the match but hindered the home team just as much as the Ephs and Williams was able to shutout Rensselaer for their third zero of the season. Excellent ice conditions awaited the team for their first home game of the season and the Ephs used the atypical surface to great effect. Williams batter Bates 13–0 in one of the most lopsided results in program history. Watkins' 4 goals led the way but he assisted on several others as the Ephs had their way with the Bobcats. Dominant throughout the night, the starting forwards put up six goals in the first half of the match before they took a breather for the second half of the middle frame. Chapman, seeing little acting in the first, was replaced by Hutchins at the start of the second but the backup netminder had a rather easy night. Banks and Austin were each able to find the back of the cage and round out a stunning victory for Williams. The Purple continued their strong play against Boston University in a battle between two evenly-matched teams. Despite a strong goaltending performance from the scarlet netminder, Williams was able to dent the twine on three occasions with Watkins serving as the catalyst for the offense.

The next match for Williams was probably its most daunting challenge as the team was up against the preeminent power in college hockey, Harvard. Despite their tall task, Williams appeared to be the better of the two in the first period and gained a lead with Popham's opening marker. As the game wore on, Harvard was able to use is multitude of alternate players to wear down the Ephs as the Purple used just one extra player in the match. While the first and third periods went a standard 15 minutes, the middle from lasted for 20 minutes and saw the Purple flag badly in the later portion. Harvard scored three times in the second to take a lead they would not relinquish. The start to the third was delayed due to the first period of a match between BU and Bowdoin that took place in the interim. The long break allowed Williams to catch their breath and attempt a comeback but the Crimson defense was too good. Several scoring chanced were wiped away by the Harvard defenders while a fourth goal with about 5 minutes remaining put the final nail in Williams' coffin.

The team had to stew with that loss for over two weeks as their schedule was silent until after the exam break. Upon their return, no immediate changes were made to the lineup and nearly the same group that made the journey to Lake Placid headed over to Ithaca for the second road trip of the year. The team was supposed to kick of the back half of their schedule with a home game against Amherst on the 4th but that match had to be cancelled when the Lord Jeffs didn't show. Instead, Williams took on Cornell the following evening and got off to a quick start with three goals in the first. The Big Red picked up their play and tried to outmuscle the Ephs over the final 30 minutes but Williams was up to the task. Cornell scored four goals in the final two periods but the Purple got a pair themselves to stay in the lead and win by a single goal. The team took an overnight train to Buffalo and faced the Nichols Club, an amateur team made up of former college players. The game was slow due to soft ice but that didn't stop Williams from continuing their inspired play. The forward unit shelled the Nichols cage all night long and it was only through outstanding goaltending that the Ephs were limited to 3 goals. That was still enough to earn the Purple a victory and the team headed back to New York City hunting for bigger game.

Before the game with Dartmouth, Williams welcomed Blaney back into the lineup while freshmen Brigham and Field were now eligible to play, having completed one semester of study. Williams moved Smith to the second offensive group hoping to have plenty of substitutes for the team as they took on another imposing foe. This time the team was playing before 12,000 people at MSG but they couldn't quite provide the same level of drama as their earlier match. The Ephs did not look outclassed in the game and gave the Indians a tough challenge, but the Purple had a fatal tendency to play as individuals rather than as a team. A spectacular play from Watkins opened the scoring but Dartmouth took over afterwards and scored the final four goals of the match. While the game was a disappointment for Williams, as the team had been in the running for an Intercollegiate championship beforehand, the match had also doubled as benefit for the Cathedral of St. John the Divine and Bishop Manning had thanked the captains of both teams for their work before the start of the second period.

Williams returned home and, on a rink that had been built next to Sage Hall, proved they were still the class of the small colleges by dropping the Mass Aggies 7–0. Blaney's hat-trick showed that he was worthy of a spot on the top line while coach Bower used more than a dozen men in the contest including Ebenezer Smith and Shepler who were both seeing the first action of the season. The following game saw Williams post its first 10-win season in history when they took down rival Amherst. Despite playing a ragged game, the Ephs kept the puck in their opponent's end for most of the match and proved that they were still the class of the small colleges.

Over the final week of the season, Williams squeezed in three games with the first coming at West Point. In spite of soft ice, the Ephs were able to hem the Cadets in their own end for most of the game. Williams wasn't able to score until the second half of the match but as Army was on the defensive the almost entire time that didn't harm the Ephs chances at winning. Two days later the team faced Amherst in a rematch and completely swamped the Lord Jeffs. Hat-tricks from Popham and Watkins provide more than enough as the Ephs skated away with an 11–0 victory with nearly every player on the team seeing some ice time. The slightly longer game (20 minute second period) also served to complete the Little Three championship for Williams. The final game of the season came a few days later when the Ephs travelled down to face Princeton. In an almost carbon-copy of their earlier match with Harvard, Williams jumped out to an early lead but vast reserves employed by the Tigers enabled the home team to wear down the Purple squad and eventually eke out a win. Popham's two goals in the first came on outstanding plays, however, that was all that Williams could muster. Princeton tied the game in the final minutes of the frame and then proceeded to wear out the Ephs over the final 40 minutes. By the time Hallock scored the winning goal it seemed inevitable that the Ephs would lose but only because they could not match the manpower of the Tigers.

Frederick Cleveland served as team manager with Berkley Hotchkiss as his assistant.

== Roster ==
| No. | Nat. | Player | Class | Pos | Height | Weight | DoB | Hometown | Previous team |
|---|---|---|---|---|---|---|---|---|---|
| | (United States) | Francis D. Austin | Sophomore | D/F | | | | Douglaston, New York |
| | (United States) | Mills P. Baker | Senior | D | | | 1903-04-18 | Great Neck, New York |
| | (United States) | Talcott M. Banks Jr. | Sophomore | LW/RW | | | | Williamstown, Massachusetts |
| | (United States) | William O. Blaney | Sophomore | RW | | | 1905-09-15 | Waban, Massachusetts |
| | (United States) | H. Prescott Brigham Jr. | Freshman | C | | | | West Newton, Massachusetts |
| | (United States) | Daniel K. Chapman | Senior | G | | | | New York, New York |
| | (United States) | Robert H. Field | Freshman | LW | | | | Providence, Rhode Island |
| | (United States) | Arthur B. Hellyer | Freshman | D | | | | Riverside, Illinois |
| | (United States) | Dunton Howe | Freshman | D | | | | Providence, Rhode Island |
| | (United States) | Frederic W. Howe Jr. | Senior | D | | | | Providence, Rhode Island |
| | (United States) | Curtis M. Hutchins | Sophomore | G | | | 1907-04-23 | Newton, Massachusetts |
| | (United States) | Clinton S. Mason | Junior | C/LW | | | 1905-02-01 | Watertown, Massachusetts |
| | (United States) | Robert M. Popham | Senior | LW | | | | New York, New York |
| | (United States) | Dwight C. Shepler | Sophomore | RW | | | 1905-08-11 | Newton Center, Massachusetts |
| | (United States) | Ebenezer Smith | Senior | D | | | | New York, New York |
| | (United States) | Leonard H. Smith Jr. | Junior | RW | | | 1904-02-03 | Brooklyn, New York |
| | (United States) | Harry A. Watkins (C) | Senior | C | | | 1904-02-07 | South Orange, New Jersey |

== Standings ==
1925–26 Eastern Collegiate ice hockey standings
| | Intercollegiate | | | | | | | Overall | | | | | |
| | GP | W | L | T | Pct. | GF | GA | GP | W | L | T | GF | GA |
|---|---|---|---|---|---|---|---|---|---|---|---|---|---|
| Amherst | 7 | 1 | 4 | 2 | .286 | 11 | 28 | 7 | 1 | 4 | 2 | 11 | 28 |
| Army | 8 | 3 | 5 | 0 | .375 | 14 | 23 | 9 | 3 | 6 | 0 | 17 | 30 |
| Bates | 9 | 3 | 5 | 1 | .389 | 18 | 37 | 9 | 3 | 5 | 1 | 18 | 37 |
| Boston College | 3 | 2 | 1 | 0 | .667 | 9 | 5 | 15 | 6 | 8 | 1 | 46 | 54 |
| Boston University | 11 | 7 | 4 | 0 | .636 | 28 | 11 | 15 | 7 | 8 | 0 | 31 | 28 |
| Bowdoin | 6 | 4 | 2 | 0 | .667 | 18 | 13 | 7 | 4 | 3 | 0 | 18 | 18 |
| Clarkson | 5 | 2 | 3 | 0 | .400 | 10 | 13 | 8 | 4 | 4 | 0 | 25 | 25 |
| Colby | 5 | 0 | 4 | 1 | .100 | 9 | 18 | 6 | 1 | 4 | 1 | – | – |
| Cornell | 6 | 2 | 4 | 0 | .333 | 10 | 21 | 6 | 2 | 4 | 0 | 10 | 21 |
| Dartmouth | – | – | – | – | – | – | – | 15 | 12 | 3 | 0 | 72 | 34 |
| Hamilton | – | – | – | – | – | – | – | 10 | 7 | 3 | 0 | – | – |
| Harvard | 9 | 8 | 1 | 0 | .889 | 34 | 13 | 11 | 8 | 3 | 0 | 38 | 20 |
| Massachusetts Agricultural | 8 | 3 | 4 | 1 | .438 | 10 | 20 | 8 | 3 | 4 | 1 | 10 | 20 |
| Middlebury | 8 | 5 | 3 | 0 | .625 | 19 | 16 | 8 | 5 | 3 | 0 | 19 | 16 |
| MIT | 9 | 3 | 6 | 0 | .333 | 16 | 32 | 9 | 3 | 6 | 0 | 16 | 32 |
| New Hampshire | 3 | 1 | 2 | 0 | .333 | 5 | 7 | 7 | 1 | 6 | 0 | 11 | 29 |
| Norwich | – | – | – | – | – | – | – | 2 | 1 | 1 | 0 | – | – |
| Princeton | 8 | 5 | 3 | 0 | .625 | 21 | 25 | 16 | 7 | 9 | 0 | 44 | 61 |
| Rensselaer | – | – | – | – | – | – | – | 6 | 2 | 4 | 0 | – | – |
| Saint Michael's | – | – | – | – | – | – | – | – | – | – | – | – | – |
| St. Lawrence | 2 | 0 | 2 | 0 | .000 | 1 | 4 | 2 | 0 | 2 | 0 | 1 | 4 |
| Syracuse | 6 | 2 | 2 | 2 | .500 | 8 | 7 | 7 | 3 | 2 | 2 | 10 | 7 |
| Union | 6 | 2 | 3 | 1 | .417 | 18 | 24 | 6 | 2 | 3 | 1 | 18 | 24 |
| Vermont | 4 | 1 | 3 | 0 | .250 | 18 | 11 | 5 | 2 | 3 | 0 | 20 | 11 |
| Williams | 15 | 10 | 4 | 1 | .700 | 59 | 23 | 18 | 12 | 5 | 1 | 72 | 28 |
| Yale | 10 | 1 | 8 | 1 | .150 | 9 | 23 | 14 | 4 | 9 | 1 | 25 | 30 |

== Schedule and results ==
| Date | Opponent | Site | Result | Record |
Regular Season
| December 29 | vs. Yale* | Lake Placid Rink • Lake Placid, New York | W 3–1 | 1–0–0 |
| December 30 | vs. Yale* | Lake Placid Rink • Lake Placid, New York | L 2–3 | 1–1–0 |
| December 31 | vs. Yale* | Lake Placid Rink • Lake Placid, New York | T 1–1 | 1–1–1 |
| January 1 | vs. Yale* | Lake Placid Rink • Lake Placid, New York | W 1–0 | 2–1–1 |
| January 2 | at Apawamis Club* | Rye, New York | W 7–0 | 3–1–1 |
| January 5 | vs. Queen's* | Madison Square Garden • Manhattan, New York | L 3–4 ^{4OT} | 3–2–1 |
| January 10 | at Rensselaer* | RPI Rink • Troy, New York | W 3–0 | 4–2–1 |
| January 14 | Bates* | Weston Field Rink • Williamstown, Massachusetts | W 13–0 | 5–2–1 |
| January 16 | Boston University* | Weston Field Rink • Williamstown, Massachusetts | W 3–2 | 6–2–1 |
| January 20 | at Harvard* | Boston Arena • Boston, Massachusetts | L 1–4 | 6–3–1 |
| February 5 | at Cornell* | Beebe Lake • Ithaca, New York | W 5–4 | 7–3–1 |
| February 6 | at Nichols Club* | Nichols School Rink • Buffalo, New York | W 3–1 | 8–3–1 |
| February 13 | vs. Dartmouth* | Madison Square Garden • Manhattan, New York | L 1–4 | 8–4–1 |
| February 16 | Massachusetts Agricultural* | Sage Hall Rink • Williamstown, Massachusetts | W 7–0 | 9–4–1 |
| February 20 | at Amherst* | Pratt Field Rink • Amherst, Massachusetts | W 3–1 | 10–4–1 |
| February 22 | at Army* | Stuart Rink • West Point, New York | W 3–0 | 11–4–1 |
| February 24 | Amherst* | Sage Hall Rink • Williamstown, Massachusetts | W 11–0 | 12–4–1 |
| February 27 | at Princeton* | Hobey Baker Memorial Rink • Princeton, New Jersey | L 2–3 | 12–5–1 |
*Non-conference game.
