= 1922–23 Princeton Tigers men's ice hockey season =

College ice hockey season

- Conference: 3rd THL
- Home ice: Hobey Baker Memorial Rink

Record
- Overall: 12–5–1
- Conference: 2–4–0
- Home: 9–3–0
- Road: 3–2–0
- Neutral: 0–0–1

Coaches and captains
- Head coach: Chippy Gaw
- Captain: Howell Van Gerbig

The 1922–23 Princeton Tigers men's ice hockey season was the 23rd season of play for the program. The Tigers were coached Chippy Gaw in his 1st season.

== Season ==
The season began with drastic changes for the Tigers. Aside from the typical roster turnover, the team was welcoming in a new head coach for the third consecutive season. Chippy Gaw was coming off a successful season with Dartmouth and the Princeton faithful were hoping he could turn around a program that had flagged recently. The other big change, and one that was sure to provide a boost to the team, was the opening of the Hobey Baker Memorial Rink. The facility was the second on-campus ice rink in the country, being completed one year after the Russell Sage Rink. The call for candidates pulled in a bumper harvest of 80 students for the first practice, however, the team encountered an unforeseen problem early in the season. The new ice rink would need approximately 150,000 gallons of water over 3 days for the ice surface and the town's water supply wasn't able to handle that request. Princeton, New Jersey was experiencing a drought at the time and the school's allotment of water was already being used for other pursuits. The school asked the student body to try and conserve as much water as possible so that the ice could be formed, believing that a concerted effort would allow the rink to be usable within 3 or 4 days. Princeton was hoping to have this completed bY December 16, the day that the rink was set to be dedicated in honor of Hobey Baker. In the meantime, plans to build a cooling plant that would recycle water through the pipes was already underway but it could not be finished until at least the end of the month.

Hoping that the early-season plans would come to fruition, the team had its first game tentatively set for December 16 with potentially a few more during the winter break. The team ended having to travel to New York for their first on-ice practice as the water conservation did not yield the needed results. The rink's opening was rescheduled to January 5 and the opening game with the St. Nicholas Hockey Club was cancelled since the players would not have enough practice time ahead of the game. The Hobey Baker Memorial Rink was finally ready for use on the 15th and the team held its first practice on the new rink. Due to the nearly three week delay, the team ended up scrapping all of its games in December and set its first match for just after New Year's.

Princeton began the year at the Iceland Rink on the corner of Broadway and 53rd. They met McGill on January 2 and looked to be a far better unit than they had been the year before. With a forward unit of Davis, Norrie and Stout, the team was relying on a pair of new players for their offensive punch. The defense was composed of Howell Van Gerbig and Wall, both returning players who would be expected to hold off the opposition while another new player, Gleason, got use to starting in goal. While they opened the scoring and held the lead for much of the game, an injury to Wall allowed the Redmen to claw their way back and eke out a 1-goal victory. A few days later, 2,700 spectators crammed into the Hobey Baker Memorial Rink for the first game ever held under its roof. The team's play was loose and ragged in the early portion of the match, allowing St. Nicholas to build a 2-goal lead after the first period. Coach Gaw moved Van Gerbig to Right Wing at the start of the second and the adjustment paid dividends with the team's captain netting 2 goals in the middle frame. Davis joined in with a marker just before the second intermission and the defense then held off the amateurs for the remainder of the contest.

If the team was experiencing any jitters in the first two games, all those were forgotten when they took the ice against MIT. The Tigers skated rings around the Engineers and completely shut down the visitor's offense. Van Gerbig recorded 5 goals in the game and was joined on the scoresheet by Davis, Norrie and Sadler. The game went so well for Princeton that coach Gaw was able to give all 15 members of the team some time on the ice, including all three goaltenders. Princeton continued the torrid play a few days later when Penn arrived. The Tigers fired goal after goal into the cage, racking up a total of 13 markers in the match against a team that was hamstrung by a lack of practice time. This time Van Gerbig finished the game with 6 goals to his name while Davis wasn't far behind with 5. The lone goal scored by the Quakers came at the end of the third with most of the Tigers' starters having long been swapped out for their understudies.

With the next game coming against the vaunted Harvard Crimson it was all but certain that the team would not be able to keep up its scoring pace. Sure enough, once the game started, Harvard put up a far stronger defensive front than their other opponents, however, Princeton's inspired play continued and the Tigers' defense shut down the Crimson attack. Van Gerbig was again the star for Princeton, scoring the team's second and third goals before putting up a defensive wall that made sure one would stand as the game-winner. This was the first road win for Princeton against Harvard since 1912, when Hobey Baker was playing for the Tigers.

Princeton didn't lose an ounce of its power after the biggest win in nearly a decade and romped over Columbia a few days later. Davis recorded a hat-trick in the first four minutes of the match and paced the team to an 8-goal opening period. Davis finished the match with 5 markers while Van Gerbig and Stout each had hat-trick of their own. The team scored 14 in all and didn't allow a single goal in retaliation. The win tied the program record for the largest margin of victory, matching the previous record that was set during the Hobey Baker-era. The end of the week saw another overpowering performance from Princeton, this time by swamping Hamilton 10–2. Stout had his best game of the year, leading the pack with 5 goals and the team didn't even appear to miss Van Gerbig who was absent due to a minor injury.

With Yale up next, the Tigers had a chance to make themselves the favorite for the Intercollegiate championship. In order to curtail Princeton's offensive advantage, Yale essentially played with three defenseman during the game as one of the forwards would stay back to stop any counterattack from the Tigers. Early on, at least, that didn't appear to help the Bulldogs as Stout got the ball rolling early in the first period. After Van Gerbig made it 2–0 a minute later. O'Hearn and Bulkley scored before and after the first intermission to tie the score but Davis put Princeton back into the lead in the middle of the second. Yale tied the game once more at the end of the period and then played total defense for the remainder of the match in order to prevent another Princeton goal. While the tactic worked, it also stopped Yale from being able to do much on offense and both goaltenders began to turn in stellar performances. with no goals in the third, two 5-minute overtime periods were agreed to but the score stubbornly refused to change. A third, sudden death overtime was then called for and at about the 6-minute mark, Wall fired home the winning goal.

Princeton rounded out the month in style, dominating Bates with another outstanding game for the home fans. Davis netted 4 goals while Van Gerbig and Stout each had a pair. The team hit the road for the last match, meeting Army for another easy win, though the team was a bit slowed due to the absence of Van Gerbig and Stout.

With the team at 9–1 and possessing wins over their conference rivals, Princeton was the class of college hockey and was in position for the thirst championship since 1914. Unfortunately, due to the exam schedule, the team did not have another game scheduled for over two weeks. The team arranged a trip during the 3-day vacation period after the exams and met the Nichols Club of Buffalo for an away game. While the score was close, that was entirely due to the herculean efforts of the opposing goaltender, who stopped at least 50 shots in the game. The team then practiced at Lake Placid before taking an early train to New Haven for the rematch with Yale. Princeton was missing Norrie from their starting lineup but was otherwise the same team that had defeated the Elis earlier. Yale continued their defensive style from earlier and succeeded in stopping the Princeton offense cold; the Tigers were unable to get anything into the Bulldog cage. Fortunately, Gleason was just as stingy in Princeton's end and regulation ended without a goal on either side. Just like the earlier match, two overtime periods resulted in no scoring so a third and final session was needed. This time it took 13 minutes before the winning goal was scored but now it was the Elis who had reason to celebrate. Yale's winning goal was the first loss for Princeton against a collegiate opponent but it didn't end their pursuit of a championship as a third and deciding game between the two would be played later.

Princeton then returned home and played host to another Canadian college. Montreal gave the Tigers a stiff challenge and it took seeming all they had to overcome an early deficit and force a tie. The Carabins led by 2–1 and 4–2 before a stellar third period saw Princeton tie the match. Van Gerbig and Stout each scored twice to save the Tigers from defeat. Because Montreal had a train to catch, the team was unable to play any overtime sessions and the game was declared a draw. The ten was sent into a collision course with Harvard. The Crimson, three-time defending champions, had already suffered three losses and a further defeat to the Tigers would end any chance of their winning a championship. Harvard followed the Yale blueprint and played a stifling brand of defense against the Tigers. The tactic resulted in 0 goals through the first two periods but Harvard got into the lead at the start of the third. Davis tied the game just 30 seconds later and the two went back to battling for the lead. In the middle of the period, Davis had the puck in front of the Harvard net before the Crimson captain, George Owen stole the puck, skated the length of the ice, and scored the winning goal. Princeton tried to even the score a second time but the Harvard bulwark was too much for the Tigers to overcome.

The loss to Harvard was only a minor setback since the two would play the deciding match just 4 days later. Up in Boston another defensive battle ensued and, once more, Princeton could not overcome the oppressive play of Harvard. Harvard opened the scoring when Beals scored off of a rebound in the first period and then were content to nurse their slight advantage to the end of the game. Despite a desperate attack, none of Princeton's shots were able to get past the Harvard netminder and the Tigers saw their chances at a championship dwindle away to nothing.

While the team was no longer in the running for a championship, the Tigers could still play spoiler. After a relatively easy win over Williams, Princeton hosted Dartmouth, who had vaulted into the top spot after Princeton's poor February. The game followed an almost identical pattern that their last few games had as Dartmouth got a lead early in the second and then played a staunch defensive game to retain the advantage. It wasn't until the start of the third that Princeton was finally able to break through and scored just 32 seconds into the frame. The goal seemed to turn the tide in Princeton's favor with Scull and Van Gerbig adding goals to give the black and orange the victory. For Dartmouth the loss was catastrophic as it ended up costing the Indians the intercollegiate championship.

The following week saw Princeton travel south for a rematch with Penn. The score was much closer than the first meeting but the result was the same. After a slow opening period, Davis and Stout combined for 5 goals in the second and effectively ended the game. The Quakers were able to get two on the board in the third, once coach Gaw began substituting players, but that hardly changed the character of the match. The game saw the first appearance on the year for Jackson, who had played with the team the year before. The rubber match with Yale was the final game of the year for Princeton and the Tigers looked to be the better squad for most of the game. The defensive style continued to perplex the Tigers, who were only able to get a single goal in the game, but they had a lead by the midway point of the match. Unfortunately, a brief offensive flurry at the end of the second doomed the Tigers. After the game had been tied, Yale recorded 2 goals in 23 seconds to take the lead and Princeton was unable to answer. Despite desperate attempts by Davis and Van Gerbig, Princeton could not break through the Eli defense and ended their best season in almost a decade with a loss.

== Roster ==
No.	Nat.	Player	Class	Pos	Height	Weight	DoB	Hometown	Previous team
	(United States)	William H. Brown	Senior	D/F				Lewiston, New York
		Charles E. Davis Jr.	Sophomore	C
	(United States)	John A. Gleason	Sophomore	G				New York, New York
		Green		LW/RW
	(United States)	Wellington S. Henderson	Sophomore	C/LW			1902-02-15	Elko, Nevada
	(Canada)	William H. Jackson	Junior	C				Scotch Lake, New Brunswick
	(United States)	John H. Jewett	Senior	LW/RW			1902-02-21
	(United States)	Ralph C. McLeod	Sophomore	G			1900-12-29	Albemarle, North Carolina
	(United States)	Frederic B. Mohle	Junior	D			1901-02-23	New York, New York
		Lewis G. Norrie	Junior	D/F			1901-12-25
		Houstoun M. Sadler	Junior	LW/RW
		William S. Scull	Sophomore	D/RW
		Robert M. Snyder	Sophomore	C
	(United States)	Edmund C. Stout Jr.	Sophomore	LW			1902-11-04	South Orange, New Jersey
		Frank D. Talmage	Sophomore	G			1901-01-17
	(United States)	Howell Van Gerbig (C)	Junior	D/RW			1902-06-19	New York, New York
	(United States)	Albert C. Wall	Junior	D			1902-02-12	South Orange, New Jersey

== Standings ==
1922–23 Eastern Collegiate ice hockey standings
	Intercollegiate							Overall					
	GP	W	L	T	Pct.	GF	GA	GP	W	L	T	GF	GA
Amherst	8	4	3	1	.563	15	24	8	4	3	1	15	24
Army	11	5	6	0	.455	26	35	14	7	7	0	36	39
Bates	9	6	3	0	.667	34	25	12	8	4	0	56	32
Boston College	5	5	0	0	1.000	30	6	14	12	1	1	53	18
Boston University	7	2	5	0	.286	21	22	8	2	6	0	22	26
Bowdoin	6	3	3	0	.500	18	28	9	5	4	0	37	33
Clarkson	3	1	1	1	.500	3	14	6	2	3	1	18	28
Colby	6	2	4	0	.333	15	21	6	2	4	0	15	21
Columbia	9	0	9	0	.000	14	35	9	0	9	0	14	35
Cornell	6	1	3	2	.333	6	16	6	1	3	2	6	16
Dartmouth	12	10	2	0	.833	49	20	15	13	2	0	67	26
Hamilton	7	2	5	0	.286	20	34	10	4	6	0	37	53
Harvard	10	7	3	0	.700	27	11	12	8	4	0	34	19
Maine	6	2	4	0	.333	16	23	6	2	4	0	16	23
Massachusetts Agricultural	9	3	4	2	.444	13	24	9	3	4	2	13	24
Middlebury	3	0	3	0	.000	1	6	3	0	3	0	1	6
MIT	8	3	5	0	.375	16	52	8	3	5	0	16	52
Pennsylvania	6	1	4	1	.250	8	36	7	2	4	1	11	38
Princeton	15	11	4	0	.733	84	21	18	12	5	1	93	30
Rensselaer	5	1	4	0	.200	6	23	5	1	4	0	6	23
Saint Michael's	3	1	2	0	.333	4	5	–	–	–	–	–	–
Union	0	0	0	0	–	0	0	3	2	1	0	–	–
Williams	9	5	3	1	.611	33	17	10	6	3	1	40	17
Yale	13	9	4	0	.692	70	16	15	9	6	0	75	26

1922–23 Triangular Hockey League standings
	Conference								Overall					
	GP	W	L	T	PTS	SW	GF	GA	GP	W	L	T	GF	GA
Harvard *	6	4	2	0	.667	2	9	10	12	8	4	0	34	19
Yale	6	3	3	0	.500	1	13	10	15	9	6	0	75	26
Princeton	6	2	4	0	.333	0	9	11	18	12	5	1	93	30
* indicates conference champion

== Schedule and results ==
Date	Opponent	Site	Result	Record
Regular Season
January 2	vs. McGill*	Iceland Rink • New York, New York	L 2–3	0–1–0
January 5	St. Nicholas Hockey Club*	Hobey Baker Memorial Rink • Princeton, New Jersey	W 3–2	1–1–0
January 6	MIT*	Hobey Baker Memorial Rink • Princeton, New Jersey	W 9–0	2–1–0
January 10	Pennsylvania*	Hobey Baker Memorial Rink • Princeton, New Jersey	W 13–1	3–1–0
January 13	at Harvard	Boston Arena • Boston, Massachusetts	W 3–1	4–1–0 (1–0–0)
January 17	Columbia*	Hobey Baker Memorial Rink • Princeton, New Jersey	W 14–0	5–1–0
January 20	Hamilton*	Hobey Baker Memorial Rink • Princeton, New Jersey	W 10–2	6–1–0
January 24	Yale	Hobey Baker Memorial Rink • Princeton, New Jersey	W 4–3 ^{3OT}	7–1–0 (2–0–0)
January 27	Bates*	Hobey Baker Memorial Rink • Princeton, New Jersey	W 9–0	8–1–0
January 31	at Army*	Stuart Rink • West Point, New York	W 6–2	9–1–0
February 14	at Nichols Hockey Club*	Broadway Auditorium • Buffalo, New York (Exhibition)	W 4–2	
February 17	at Yale	New Haven Arena • New Haven, Connecticut	L 0–1 ^{3OT}	9–2–0 (2–1–0)
February 21	Montreal*	Hobey Baker Memorial Rink • Princeton, New Jersey	T 4–4	9–2–1
February 24	Harvard	Hobey Baker Memorial Rink • Princeton, New Jersey	L 1–2	9–3–1 (2–2–0)
February 28	at Harvard	Boston Arena • Boston, Massachusetts	L 0–1	9–4–1 (2–3–0)
March 2	Williams*	Hobey Baker Memorial Rink • Princeton, New Jersey	W 5–2	10–4–1
March 3	Dartmouth*	Hobey Baker Memorial Rink • Princeton, New Jersey	W 3–1	11–4–1
March 7	at Pennsylvania*	Philadelphia Ice Palace • Philadelphia, Pennsylvania	W 6–2	12–4–1
March 10	Yale	Hobey Baker Memorial Rink • Princeton, New Jersey	L 1–3	12–5–1 (2–4–0)
*Non-conference game.
