= 1928–29 Williams Ephs men's ice hockey season =

College ice hockey team season

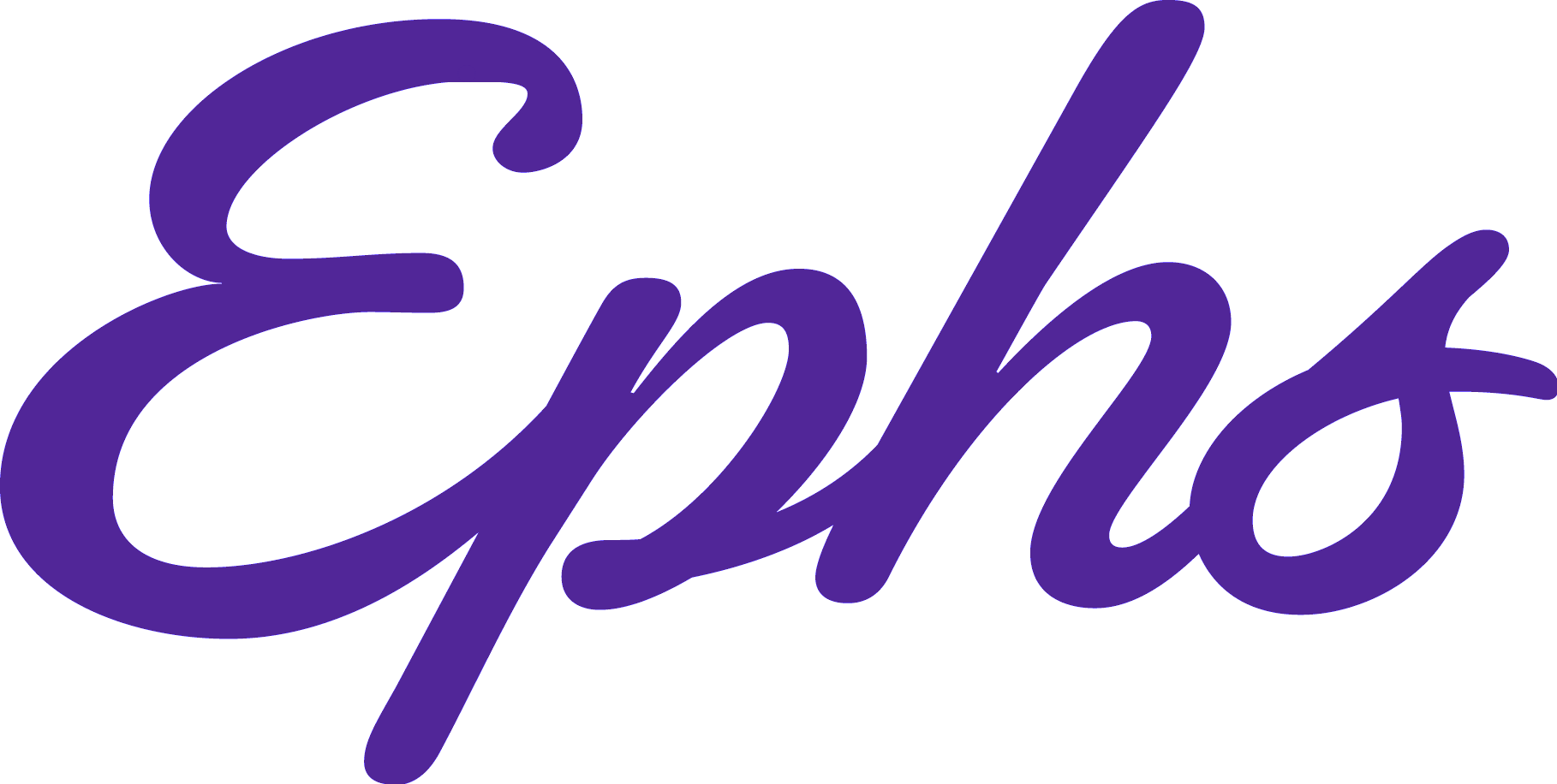
- Conference: Independent
- Home ice: Sage Hall Rink

Record
- Overall: 6–4–0
- Home: 2–3–0
- Road: 4–1–0

Coaches and captains
- Head coach: Leo Bellerose
- Captain: Dunton Howe

The 1928–29 Williams Ephs men's ice hockey season was the 26th season of play for the program.

== Season ==
Just before the team was called to the first meeting, coach Bellerose met with representatives of the other Intercollegiate Ice Hockey Association of America members in New York City. Several topics were discussed, chief among which was the addition of Pennsylvania to the league, bringing up the total membership to 10 (the other schools were Boston College, Columbia, Cornell, Dartmouth, Hamilton, Harvard, Princeton and Yale). The Association announced that the western teams were largely following the rules set out by the eastern counterparts and that Spalding would soon publish a handbook containing the rules adopted by their members. The Association made one rule change; referees were to now refrain from stopping play to call a penalty on a defending team if the attacking team was in the process of attempting to score. The committee decided that an attacking team should not be deprived of a scoring opportunity in the event of a foul from their opponent. They also decided that, in the event that a goal was not scored, the ensuing faceoff should take place at the defender's blue line. The final decision by the Association was to submit a proposal that in future Olympic years, the highest ranking college team be used as the American representative. To forestall objections to this plan, a second suggestion was put forth that a committee be organized to instead select the members of an All-American team from the various programs.

Once the team convened, the Ephs found the weather to be much more accommodating than in recent years. A colder winter helped to freeze the campus ponds and the team was able to work through several training sessions on Cole Field Pond. The extended training time allowed the team to fill in several gaps of now-graduated players. team captain Dunton Howe was paired with Ben Langmaid, who had played last year on the freshman team. Watters was promoted to starting goaltender after serving as a backup and had a pair of men battling to become his understudy. The forward contingent was in flux as prospective starting winger Wheeler was nursing a knee injury. Brigham, the nominal center, was moved to right wing with Nye slotting in at the pivot position while they waited for Wheeler's return. A good many alternates were available for Williams and, because of the team's increasing prominence, 15 men were allowed to make the annual trip to Lake Placid. Just before their trip, the weather took a turn and warmed up. The team was unable to follow up their early practice before the trip but still felt good about their chances against Amherst.

The team arrived on the 27th and were able to get in two solid days of practice before their opening game. The Ephs got off to a quick start and netted four goals in the first period with Howe and Langmaid combining for 3 scores. the Sabrinas stages a late comeback but were unable to overcome the sizable lead and Williams took the opening round. The second game was marred by poor ice and an overconfidence on the part of Williams. The Ephs got the lead in the first, however, this time they were only able to get a single goal. When Amherst stages their surge in the second, they had a much easier time surmounting the Purple and tied the series with a close victory. The deciding game of the series was held on New Year's Day and, once again, the starting defensemen led off the scoring with the first two goals. The offense joined the party in the second and Williams built another 4-goal edge. Amherst was unable to keep pace and could only earn a single marker, allowing Williams to take the series and return home victorious.

Back in Williamstown, the team found that the weather had cooled off once more and they were able to get several days of practice in before they headed off to take on Army. By then, Wheeler had recovered from his ailment and was back with the team. The full contingent of Ephs rolled over the Cadets, scoring 10 goals to Army's 0 and looked every bit the team that could vie for a championship. Brigham and Langmaid each recorded hat-tricks while Watters and Sholes shared the shutout. The next match saw Williams battle in a close match with an undermanned Union team for over two periods. The Ephs were a bit slow out of the gate and managed just 1 goal in the first 40 minutes, a feat equaled by the Dutchmen. The offense came alive in the third, however and Brigham's hat-trick paced the Purple to a comfortable margin for their fourth win of the season.

Williams was next supposed to renew their season series with Amherst on the 19th but that game was postponed due to inclement weather. Instead, the Ephs faced down Massachusetts Agricultural a few days later and got into a defensive struggle. Coach Bellerose referred to the Aggies as a "Basketball team on skates" due to their peculiar though effective 5-man defense. Williams was held in check all afternoon except on one occasion when Brigham was able to get on a break and score the only goal of the game. With Williams climbing up the rankings, the team welcomed Cornell to Williamstown but found themselves unable to break through another stout defensive unit. Cornell opened the scoring in the first and fought hard to keep their advantage. The Ephs increased the pressure in the final period but could not slip the puck past the Red goaltender and fell 0–1.

Williams had to stew in that loss over the exam break and seemed reinvigorated when they went south to take on Pennsylvania. The Quakers were unable to withstand the Williams attack and even after the second offensive unit had been subbed in, the Purple were still able to find the back of the net. Howe was the leader for the night with 3 goals. The following night the team resumed its annual contest with Princeton and gave the Tigers a tough fight through two periods. Williams surrendered 2 goals in the opening 5 minutes of the game but then settled down defensively and kept pace with Princeton for the next 40 minutes. Brigham had had several scoring opportunities in that stretch but was unable to capitalize on any of them. Over the final 15 minutes, apparently tired of such a close game, the Tigers scored 4 goals in quick succession to build an insurmountable lead over Williams. Brigham did finally get the Purple on the board but it was too little too late and the Ephs returned home after a road split.

The earlier match with Amherst finally took place a few days later as the two teams heading in different directions. Williams had been treading water and was hampered by a lack of practice time while Amherst was entering after toppling Army and were looking for revenge after the early-season defeats. Howe and Langmaid turned in stellar performances with each recording a goal and then holding off the Lord Jeffs in the later half of the game. Despite a furious comeback attempt, Amherst was only able to score once and Williams remained the better of the two. Perhaps just as important, Williams was now 7–0 in Little Three matches with Amherst, not having dropped any of the regular football, soccer or ice hockey games between the two. A rematch between the two was supposed to take place on the 19th but had to be delayed until after the match with Middlebury. The Panthers brought a physical game with them and tried to impose their will on the Ephs. The northerners managed to build a 2-goal lead at the start of the third but scored by Hoyt and Brigham just 2 minutes apart tied the match. Overtime was needed to settle the account and Middlebury pulled ahead on a goal from Kelley. Despite their best efforts, Williams was unable to tie the game a second time. The final match with Amherst saw Williams' offense continue to struggle with Brigham getting the Ephs' only goal just 3 minutes into the game. Snowfall hampered both teams and the physical play increased. There was a fairly consistent parade of players to the penalty box but neither was able to convert on any of the opportunities and the rest of the game went by without another goal. Amherst tried to assail the Williams cage in the final 10 minutes, once the floodlights were turned on, but the defense held and sent Amherst packing for the fourth time that year.

Williams ended the season with a rematch against Princeton. In the Tigers' first trip to Williamstown, the two fought a mostly clean game that still possessed an edge. Many players were sent to the ice throughout the contest but only two penalties were called for illegal plays. Williams' forwards were unable to get much going in the game so it was left up to the defense to score. After Princeton's two goals in the first, Schwartz, playing in just his second game of the season, cut the lead in half in the middle frame. Early in the second, Howe, who was playing in his final game for Williams, tied the match and gave hope that the team would be able to get one over on the visiting Orange. Unfortunately, Princeton was able to regain their lead with just 4 minutes remaining thanks to the sun shining in Watters' eyes. The team valiantly tried to score but a tripping call to Langmaid curtailed the comeback attempt and Williams went down in defeat.

Andrew Williamson served as team manager with Edward Reeves as his assistant.

== Roster ==
No.	Nat.	Player	Class	Pos	Height	Weight	DoB	Hometown	Previous team
	(United States)	Henry L. Ballou	Senior	RW			1905-12-22	Woonsocket, Rhode Island
	(United States)	H. Prescott Brigham Jr.	Senior	C				West Newton, Massachusetts
	(United States)	Robert H. Field	Senior	LW				Providence, Rhode Island
	(United States)	Harold B. Gross	Junior	LW			1908-03-28	Providence, Rhode Island
	(United States)	Robert P. Hazzard Jr.	Junior	D			1908-10-07	Gardiner, Maine
	(United States)	Dunton Howe (C)	Senior	D				Providence, Rhode Island
	(United States)	Franklin K. Hoyt	Junior	LW/RW			1907-09-11	West Newton, Massachusetts
	(United States)	Brinckerhoff W. Kendall	Sophomore					Concord, New Hampshire
	(United States)	Benjamin Langmaid	Sophomore	D				Swampscott, Massachusetts
	(United States)	George L. Nye	Senior	C				Minneapolis, Minnesota
	(United States)	Herman L. Schwartz Jr.	Sophomore	D				Ardmore, Pennsylvania
	(United States)	Frederick T. Sholes Jr.	Sophomore	G			1908-03-15	Geneva, New York
	(United States)	William R Stanwood	Sophomore				1908-02-18	Wellesley Hills, Massachusetts
	(United States)	Preston H. Watters	Senior	G			1907-01-12	West Roxbury, Massachusetts
	(United States)	Daniel F. Wheeler Jr.	Junior	LW/RW			1907-05-05	Bridgeport, Connecticut

== Standings ==
1928–29 Eastern Collegiate ice hockey standings
	Intercollegiate							Overall					
	GP	W	L	T	Pct.	GF	GA	GP	W	L	T	GF	GA
Amherst	8	3	4	1	.438	13	18	9	3	5	1	14	20
Army	9	2	7	0	.222	11	50	12	3	9	0	23	61
Bates	11	4	6	1	.409	26	20	12	5	6	1	28	21
Boston College	10	4	6	0	.400	29	27	14	5	9	0	36	42
Boston University	10	9	1	0	.900	36	9	12	9	2	1	39	14
Bowdoin	9	5	4	0	.556	11	14	9	5	4	0	11	14
Brown	–	–	–	–	–	–	–	13	8	5	0	–	–
Clarkson	7	6	1	0	.857	43	11	10	9	1	0	60	19
Colby	5	0	4	1	.100	4	11	5	0	4	1	4	11
Colgate	7	4	3	0	.571	16	18	7	4	3	0	16	18
Connecticut Agricultural	–	–	–	–	–	–	–	–	–	–	–	–	–
Cornell	5	2	3	0	.400	7	9	5	2	3	0	7	9
Dartmouth	–	–	–	–	–	–	–	17	9	5	3	58	28
Hamilton	–	–	–	–	–	–	–	10	4	6	0	–	–
Harvard	7	4	3	0	.571	26	10	10	5	4	1	31	15
Massachusetts Agricultural	11	6	5	0	.545	30	20	12	7	5	0	33	21
Middlebury	10	7	3	0	.700	27	29	10	7	3	0	27	29
MIT	11	5	6	0	.455	26	32	11	5	6	0	26	32
New Hampshire	11	6	4	1	.591	23	20	11	6	4	1	23	20
Norwich	–	–	–	–	–	–	–	8	2	6	0	–	–
Pennsylvania	11	2	9	0	.182	12	82	13	2	10	1	–	–
Princeton	–	–	–	–	–	–	–	19	15	3	1	–	–
Rensselaer	–	–	–	–	–	–	–	4	1	3	0	–	–
St. John's	–	–	–	–	–	–	–	7	3	3	1	–	–
St. Lawrence	–	–	–	–	–	–	–	8	3	4	1	–	–
St. Stephen's	–	–	–	–	–	–	–	–	–	–	–	–	–
Syracuse	–	–	–	–	–	–	–	–	–	–	–	–	–
Union	5	2	2	1	.500	17	14	5	2	2	1	17	14
Vermont	–	–	–	–	–	–	–	–	–	–	–	–	–
Williams	10	6	4	0	.600	33	16	10	6	4	0	33	16
Yale	12	10	1	1	.875	47	9	17	15	1	1	64	12

== Schedule and results ==
Date	Opponent	Site	Result	Record
Exhibition
December 30	vs. Amherst*	Lake Placid Rink • Lake Placid, New York (Exhibition)	W 5–3	
December 31	vs. Amherst*	Lake Placid Rink • Lake Placid, New York (Exhibition)	L 1–2	
January 1	vs. Amherst*	Lake Placid Rink • Lake Placid, New York (Exhibition)	W 4–1	
Regular Season
January 12	at Army*	Stuart Rink • West Point, New York	W 10–0	1–0–0
January 16	Union*	Sage Hall Rink • Williamstown, Massachusetts	W 5–1	2–0–0
January 22	at Massachusetts Agricultural*	Alumni Field Rink • Amherst, Massachusetts	W 1–0	3–0–0
January 26	Cornell*	Sage Hall Rink • Williamstown, Massachusetts	L 0–1	3–1–0
February 8	at Pennsylvania*	Philadelphia Ice Palace • Philadelphia, Pennsylvania	W 9–1	4–1–0
February 9	at Princeton*	Hobey Baker Memorial Rink • Princeton, New Jersey	L 1–6	4–2–0
February 13	at Amherst*	Pratt Field Rink • Amherst, Massachusetts	W 2–1	5–2–0
February 20	Middlebury*	Sage Hall Rink • Williamstown, Massachusetts	L 2–3 ^{OT}	5–3–0
February 21	Amherst*	Sage Hall Rink • Williamstown, Massachusetts	W 1–0	6–3–0
February 23	Princeton*	Sage Hall Rink • Williamstown, Massachusetts	L 2–3	6–4–0
*Non-conference game.

== Scoring statistics ==
Name	Position	Games	Goals
Prescott Brigham	C	-	10
Dunton Howe	D	-	8
Benjamin Langmaid	D	-	6
Jim Hoyt	LW/RW	-	4
Henry Ballou	RW	-	1
Robert Hazzard	D	-	1
George Nye	C	-	1
Herman Schwartz	D	-	1
Daniel Wheeler	LW/RW	-	1
Robert Field	LW	-	0
Harold Gross	LW	-	0
Brinckerhoff Kendall	Substitute	-	0
Frederick Sholes	G	-	0
William Stanwood	Substitute	-	0
Preston Watters	G	-	0
Total			33
