= Clarence Wanamaker =

American ice hockey player and coach

Biographical details
- Born: August 3, 1892; Wakefield, Massachusetts, U.S.
- Died: October 28, 1979 (aged 87); Great Barrington, Massachusetts, U.S.
- Education: Dartmouth College

Playing career
- 1912–1915: Dartmouth
- Position: Rover

Coaching career (HC unless noted)
- 1915–1920: Dartmouth
- 1921–1928: Yale

Head coaching record
- Overall: 97–57–4 (.627)

Accomplishments and honors

Championships
- 1924 THL Championship; 1924 East Intercollegiate Championship; 1925 THL Championship; 1925 East Intercollegiate Championship

Clarence Leroy "Bags" Wanamaker (August 3, 1892 – October 28, 1979) was an American ice hockey player and coach who was active in the 1910s and 1920s.

== Career ==
Wanamaker began attending Dartmouth College in the fall of 1911 and played for the freshman ice hockey team. While catching for the baseball team, he jumped up to the varsity ice hockey squad just in time for the arrival of Fred Rocque as head coach and led the team in scoring when it set a new program record with an 8–2 record. He followed that up with a 20-goal season while Dartmouth was again near the top of the college hockey world. In his senior season the Rover only posted 6 goals and the team finished with a losing record, but they were able to finally get wins over both Princeton and Harvard.

After graduating Wanamaker signed a contract with the New York Giants as a catcher but he never appeared in a game for the club. Wanamaker returned to his alma mater to serve as head coach after Roque left and remained with the program until 1920. In 1921 he became the head coach for Yale and led a renaissance for the program, winning back-to-back Intercollegiate Championships in 1924 and 1925. The two titles were the catalyst for convincing Yale to promote the ice hockey team to 'major' status in 1926. After a runner-up finish in 1928 Wanamaker resigned and turned over coaching duties to one of his former players, Lawrence Noble.

The 18 wins Yale earned in 1924 were a program record for over 60 years.

== Statistics ==
=== Regular season and playoffs ===
			Regular season					Playoffs
Season	Team	League	GP	G	A	Pts	PIM	GP	G	A	Pts	PIM
1912–13	Dartmouth	NCAA	—	12	—	12	—	—	—	—	—	—
1913–14	Dartmouth	NCAA	—	20	—	20	—	—	—	—	—	—
1914–15	Dartmouth	NCAA	—	6	—	6	—	—	—	—	—	—
NCAA totals			—	38	—	38	—	—	—	—	—	—

Note: Assists were not recorded as an official statistic.

== Head coaching record ==
Record table
Season	Team	Overall	Conference	Standing	Postseason
Dartmouth Independent (1915–1920)
1915–16	Dartmouth	6–5–0			
1916–17	Dartmouth	7–3–0			
1917–18	Dartmouth	2–4–0			
1919–20	Dartmouth	6–4–0			
Dartmouth:		21–16–0			
Yale Bulldogs (Triangular Hockey League) (1921–1926)
1921–22	Yale	9–10–0	2–2–0	2nd	
1922–23	Yale	9–6–0	3–3–0	2nd	
1923–24	Yale	18–4–1	4–1–0	1st	
1924–25	Yale	14–1–1	4–1–0	1st	
1925–26	Yale	4–9–1	0–4–0	3rd	
Yale:		54–39–3	13–11–0		
Yale Bulldogs Independent (1926–1928)
1926–27	Yale	8–7–1			
1927–28	Yale	14–4–0			
Yale:		22–11–1			
Total:		97–57–4			
National champion Postseason invitational champion Conference regular season champion Conference regular season and conference tournament champion Division regular season champion Division regular season and conference tournament champion Conference tournament champion
