= J. Philip Bower =

American ice hockey player

J. Philip Bowers
Biographical details
- Born: October 22, 1894; Richmond, Virginia, U.S.
- Died: July 11, 1975 (aged 80); Vergennes, Vermont, U.S.
- Education: Middlebury College; Dartmouth College

Playing career

Football
- 1915–1916: Middlebury
- 1918–1920: Dartmouth
- 1921: Cleveland Indians

Ice hockey
- 1918–1921: Dartmouth

Baseball
- 1919–1920: Dartmouth
- Position: Quarterback/Defenseman

Coaching career (HC unless noted)

Ice hockey
- 1924–1926: Williams
- 1926–1933: Dartmouth

Baseball
- 1926: Williams

Head coaching record
- Overall: 58–50–6 (.535)

Accomplishments and honors

Records
- Military career
- Burial place: Mount Pleasant Cemetery; Arlington, Massachusetts, U.S.
- Allegiance: United States
- Branch: United States Army
- Service years: 1917–1918

James Philip Bower (October 22, 1894 – July 12, 1975) was an American athlete and coach who played for the Cleveland Indians of the American Professional Football Association (later renamed the National Football League) in 1921 and was the head men's ice hockey coach at Williams College (1924–1926) and Dartmouth College (1926–1933).

== Career ==
Bower was born on October 22, 1894 in Richmond, Virginia. He attended Arlington High School in Arlington, Massachusetts and helped lead the hockey team to the 1913 Interscholastic Hockey League championship. He then attended the Worcester Academy, where he was a letterman in baseball, football and ice hockey.

Bower attended Middlebury College for two years and was captain-elect of the 1917 football team. However, he suspended his studies to enlist in the Army during World War I. After the war, Bower enrolled at Dartmouth College. During his time in Hanover, Bower was a multi-sport star for the Greens, serving as the quarterback for the football team and a defenseman on the ice hockey team. He graduated from Dartmouth in 1921.

Bower played five games for the Cleveland Indians of the American Professional Football Association during the 1921 season.

In 1924, he was hired as the third head coach for Williams hockey team and guided the team for two seasons. He also coached the Williams baseball team for one season (1926). After a stellar sophomore campaign that saw the Ephs finish 12–5–1, Bower returned to his alma mater as the head coach for the Dartmouth hockey team. In his first year behind the Indians' bench, he nearly led the program to its first championship, finishing in second only to Harvard. In 1929, he was also hired as an assistant professor by the university. A few solid but underwhelming seasons followed before the great depression hit and severely impacted the team. In the early 30's, Dartmouth was a shell of its former self and posted losing seasons every year. After going winless against Harvard and Yale for four consecutive seasons, Bower resigned from his post in 1933.

== Personal life and death ==
Bower married Irene Carroll. Towards the end of his life, he lived in Addison, Vermont. He died following an automobile accident on July 12, 1975, aged 80. He was buried in Mount Pleasant Cemetery in Arlington, Massachusetts.

== Head coaching record ==
Record table
| Season | Team | Overall | Conference | Standing | Postseason |
|---|---|---|---|---|---|
Williams Ephs Independent (1924–1926)
| 1924–25 | Williams | 4–4–0 | | | |
| 1925–26 | Williams | 12–5–1 | | | |
| Williams: | | 16–9–1 | | | |
Dartmouth Indians Independent (1926–1933)
| 1926–27 | Dartmouth | 11–2–2 | | | |
| 1927–28 | Dartmouth | 6–4–0 | | | |
| 1928–29 | Dartmouth | 9–5–3 | | | |
| 1929–30 | Dartmouth | 5–8–0 | | | |
| 1930–31 | Dartmouth | 5–8–0 | | | |
| 1931–32 | Dartmouth | 4–6–0 | | | |
| 1932–33 | Dartmouth | 2–8–0 | | | |
| Dartmouth: | | 42–41–5 | | | |
| Total: | | 58–50–6 | | | |
National champion Postseason invitational champion Conference regular season champion Conference regular season and conference tournament champion Division regular season champion Division regular season and conference tournament champion Conference tournament champion
