= Jack Shea Arena =

Indoor ice rink in Lake Placid, New York

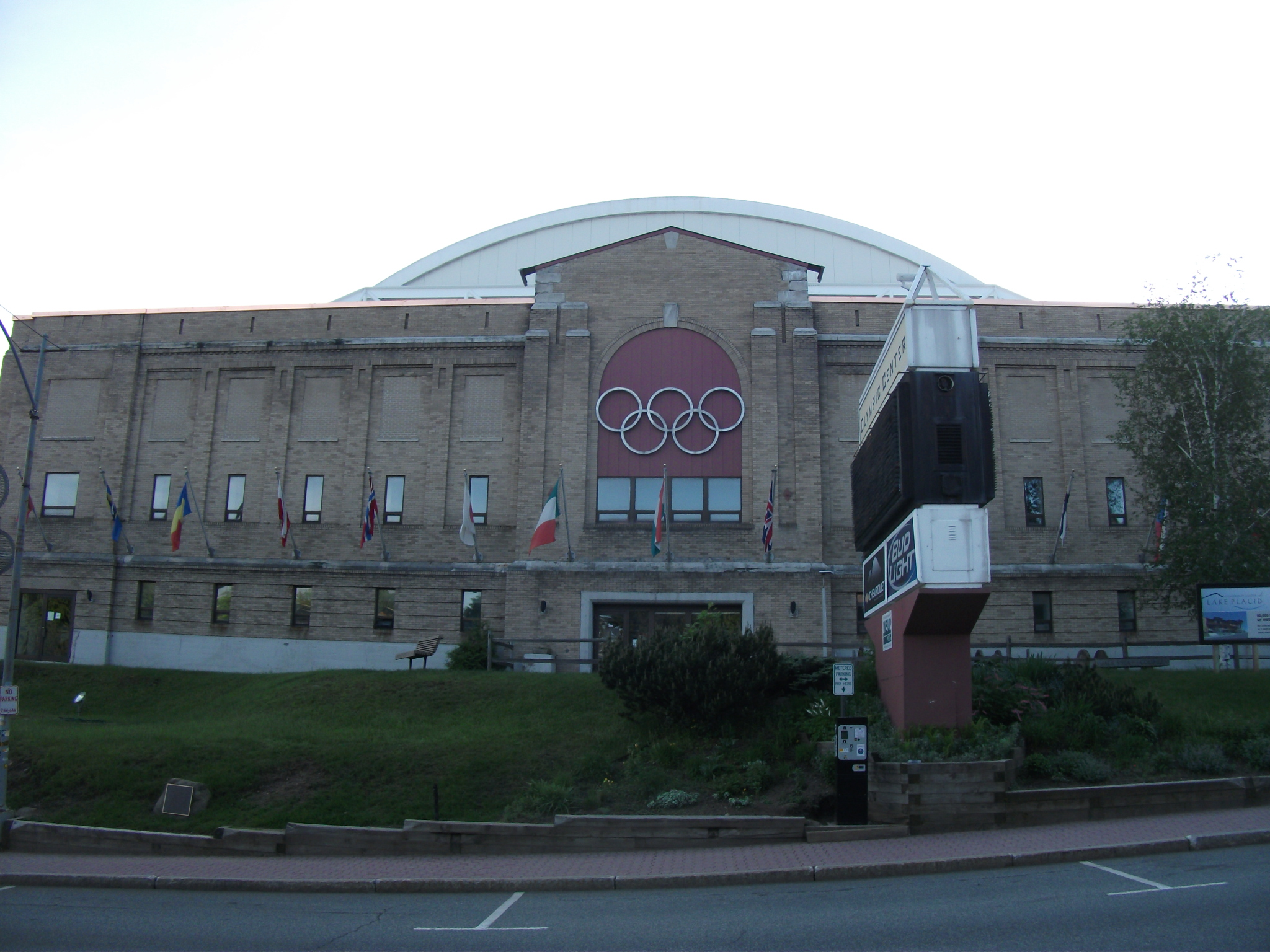
- The arena in 2011
- Interactive map of Jack Shea Arena
- Former names: 1932 Arena
- Location: 2634 Main St, Lake Placid, New York, 12946
- Coordinates: 44°17′02″N 73°59′05″W
- Operator: Olympic Center
- Surface: 200 ft. by 100 ft. (convertible)

Construction
- Opened: 1932 (93–94 years ago)
- Architects: William G. Distin and A. G. Wilson

The Jack Shea Arena is an indoor, artificial ice rink that was used for both figure skating and ice hockey competitions at the 1932 Winter Olympics. It is part of the Olympic Center complex.

== History ==
When Lake Placid was selected as the host of the 1932 Winter Olympics, the area already had several facilities, including an ice rink. However, the local rink was an open-air venue that was subject to weather conditions. Due to the time constraints and number of events that would take place, the Olympic Committee decided that an additional ice rink would need to be built. An indoor, artificial venue was completed in time for the games. The 1932 Arena, as it was originally known, was enclosed by a curved, vaulted ceiling and had seating for more than 4,000. After hosting 6 of the 12 ice hockey games at the 1932 Olympics, the rink was used for competitions for many years afterwards.

In 1980, when the Olympics returned to Lake Placid, the '32 Rink was still in operation. However, by then it was nearly 50 years old and was not deemed to be sufficient for a modern Olympics. The 1932 Arena faded into the background afterwards and, though it remained in operation, it did not possess the same amount of caché that its replacement did, particularly after the Miracle on Ice.

In 2005, the rink was renamed after Jack Shea, who had won two speed skating gold medals in 1932. Nearing its 90th birthday, the rink was in a decrepit state. Instead of razing the venue, however, the Olympic Regional Development Authority decided to renovate the building. After nine months of work, the Jack Shea Arena reopened on December 3, 2021, featuring many new amenities, including a dehumidification system, new refrigeration system, concession area, and the ability to be converted between Olympic (100 feet wide) and NHL (85 feet wide) sizes.

== Gallery ==
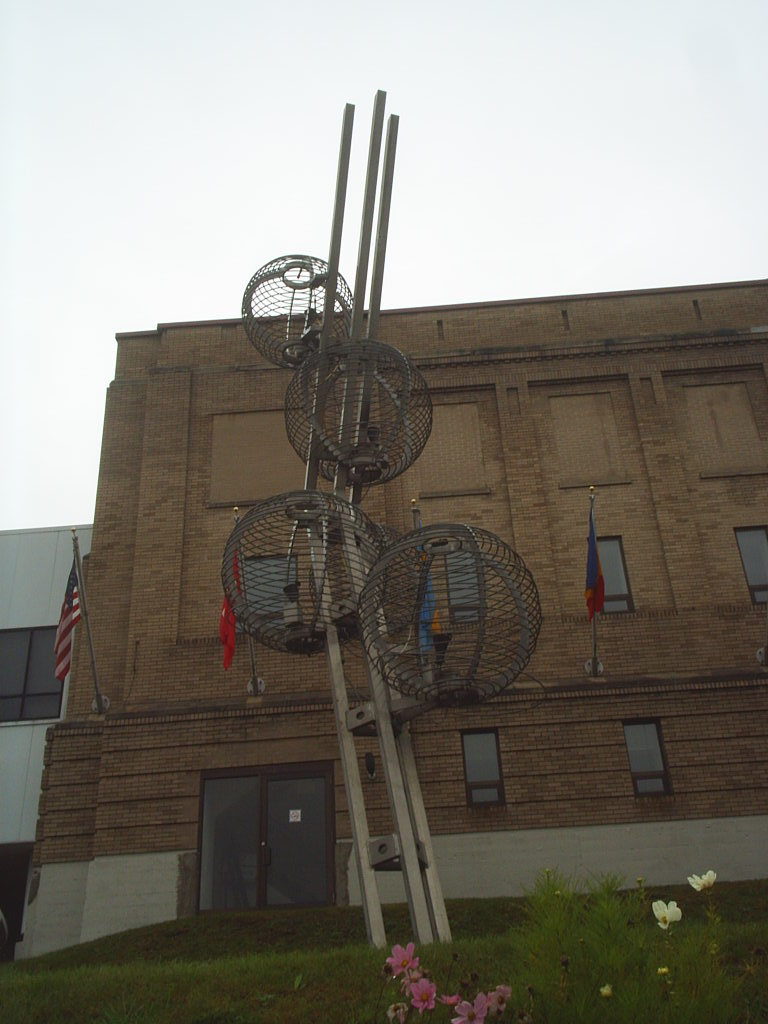
Outside the arena

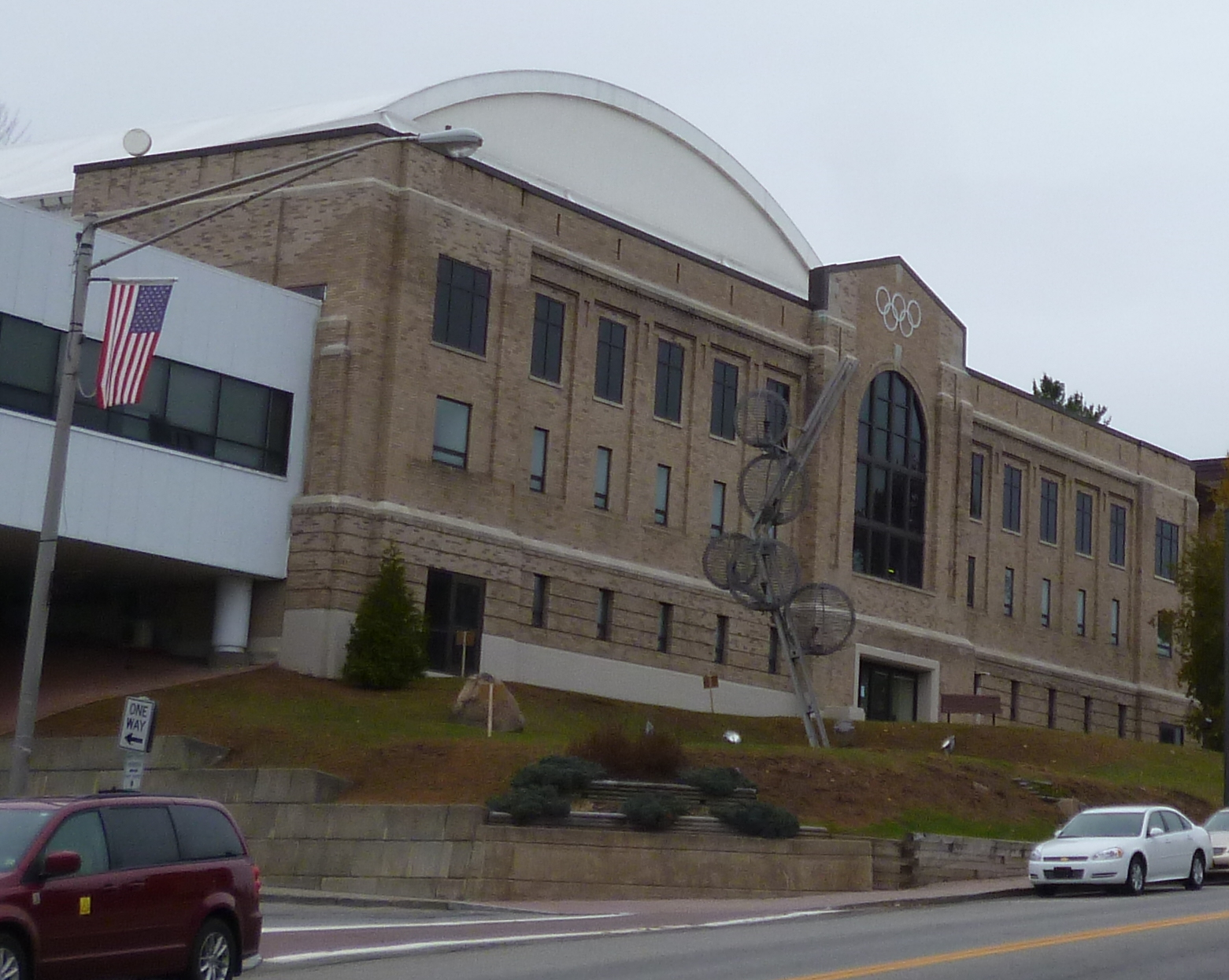
Arena facade

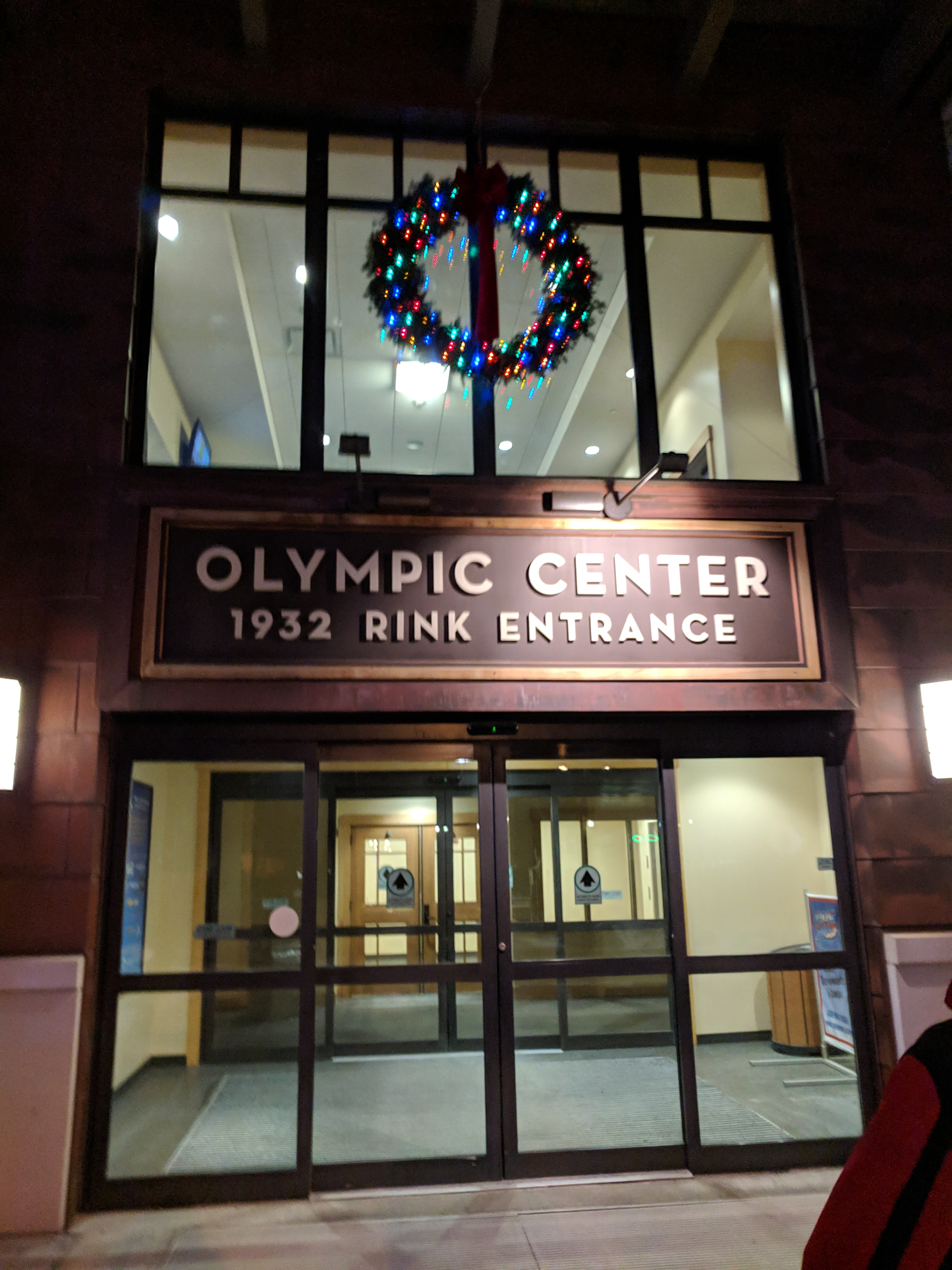
Entrance to the arena

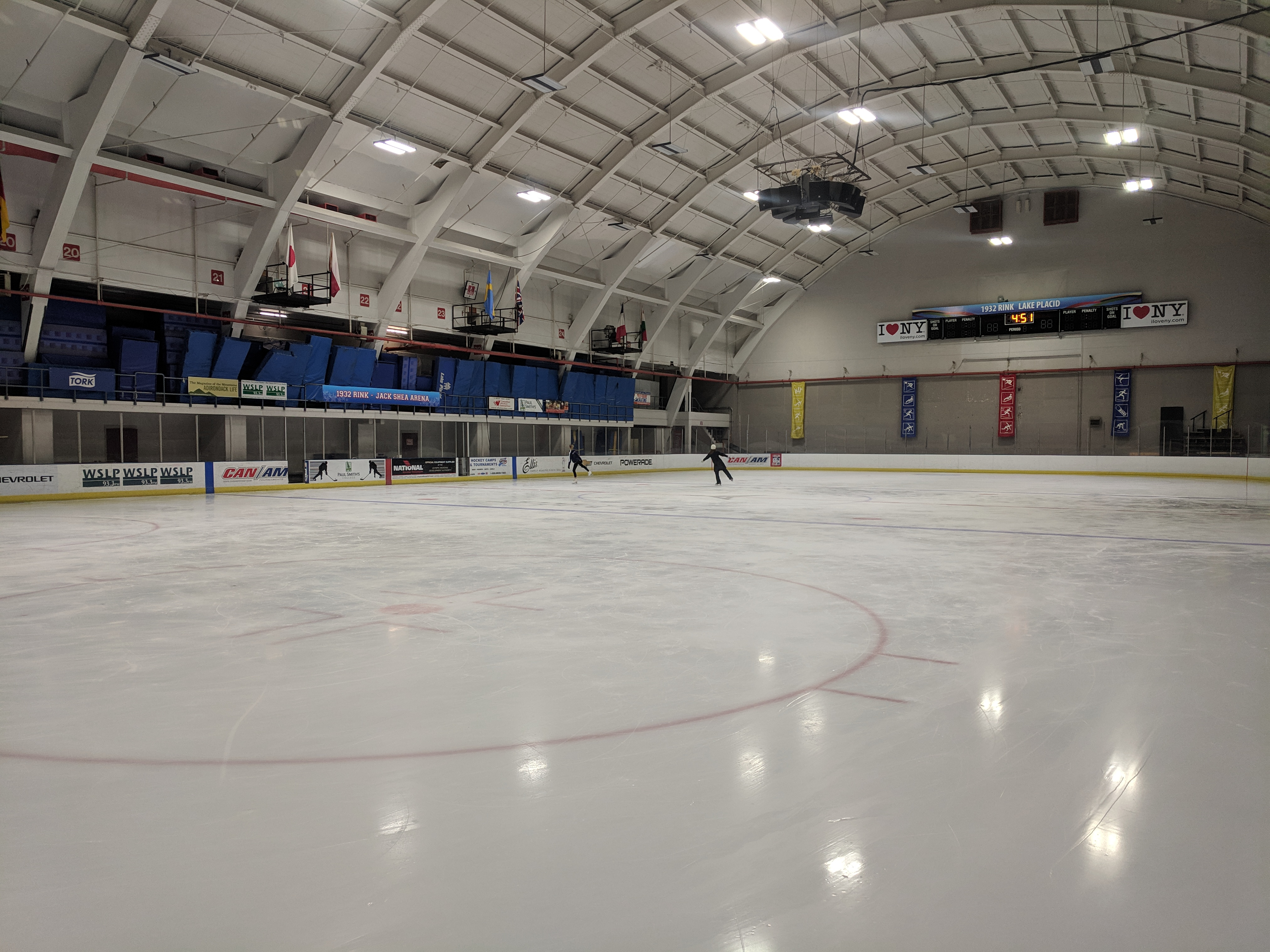
Inside the arena
