= Lake Placid Rink =

Outdoor ice rink in Lake Placid, New York

- Interactive map of Lake Placid Rink
- Location: Lake Placid, New York, 12946
- Coordinates: 44°16′57″N 73°59′02″W
- Surface: Variable

Construction
- Opened: cir. 1921 (104–105 years ago)
- Closed: February 13, 1932 (94 years ago)

The Lake Placid Rink was an outdoor ice rink that was used for various winter sports including speed skating, figure skating and ice hockey. The venue was in use through the end of the 1932 Winter Olympics, after which it was replaced by the Jack Shea Arena and James B. Sheffield Olympic Skating Rink.

== History ==
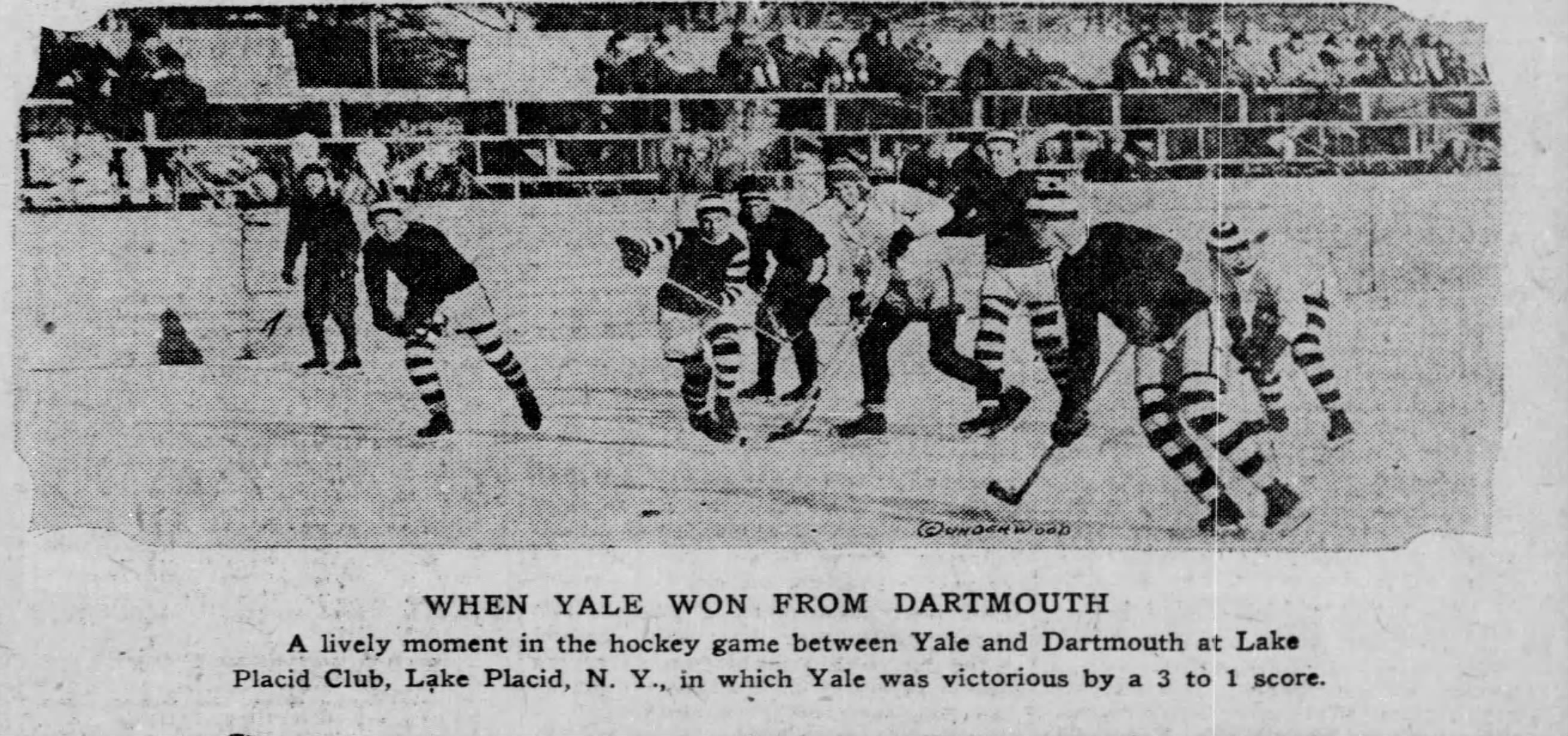
A photograph from a game between Dartmouth and Yale on January 1, 1924

In the early part of the 20th century, Melvil Dewey helped establish Lake Placid as a resort town that quickly became a home for winter sports. By the early 1920s, a ski association was formed and a ski jump facility was built near the resort. Around the same time the Lake Placid Rink was built. Originally designed as a venue for speed skating, the Rink was soon modified for both figure skating and ice hockey.

The venue helped to raise the profile of Lake Placid in athletic circles and was critical in convincing the Olympic Committee to select Lake Placid as the site of the 1932 Winter Olympics. However, due to the number of events that were to take place, additional venues would be needed for the games. Rather than build temporary facilities, Lake Placid built a state-of-the-art indoor facility for ice hockey and figure skating and refurbished the speed skating track that encircled the outdoor skating rink. Both were designed with the intent to completely supplant the original venue once the games had been completed. The Lake Placid Rink hosted six of the twelve ice hockey matches for the '32 games as well as some of the figure skating competitions. After the closing ceremonies, the central rink was dismantled.
