= Triangular Hockey League =

US hockey tournament

- Founded: 1919
- Folded: 1927
- Sports fielded: Ice hockey
- No. of teams: 3
- Region: Northeastern United States

The Triangular Hockey League began as an agreement between Harvard, Princeton and Yale to play one another in best-of-three series during the season.

== History ==
The Triangular League followed a similar pattern to the Intercollegiate Hockey League, which had existed before World War I but rather than expand to include other teams as they had previously, the Trianular league remained a 3-team conference. The future Ivy League squads were typically considered the cream of college ice hockey during the 1920s and, as a result, the League champion would often claim to be the Eastern hockey champion. The League lasted seven years and ended when Harvard and Princeton discontinued their season series in 1927.

== Members ==
Locations of member teams

Institution	Nickname	Location	Founded	Tenure	Fate	Current conference
Harvard University	Crimson	Boston, Massachusetts	1636	1919–1926	Independent	ECAC Hockey
Princeton University	Tigers	Princeton, New Jersey	1746	1919–1926	Independent	ECAC Hockey
Yale University	Bulldogs	New Haven, Connecticut	1701	1919–1926	Independent	ECAC Hockey

== See also ==
- Intercollegiate Hockey Association
- Intercollegiate Hockey League
- Pentagonal League
