= Hobey Baker Memorial Rink =

Hockey arena in New Jersey, U.S.

Coordinates: 40.3429°N 74.6578°W

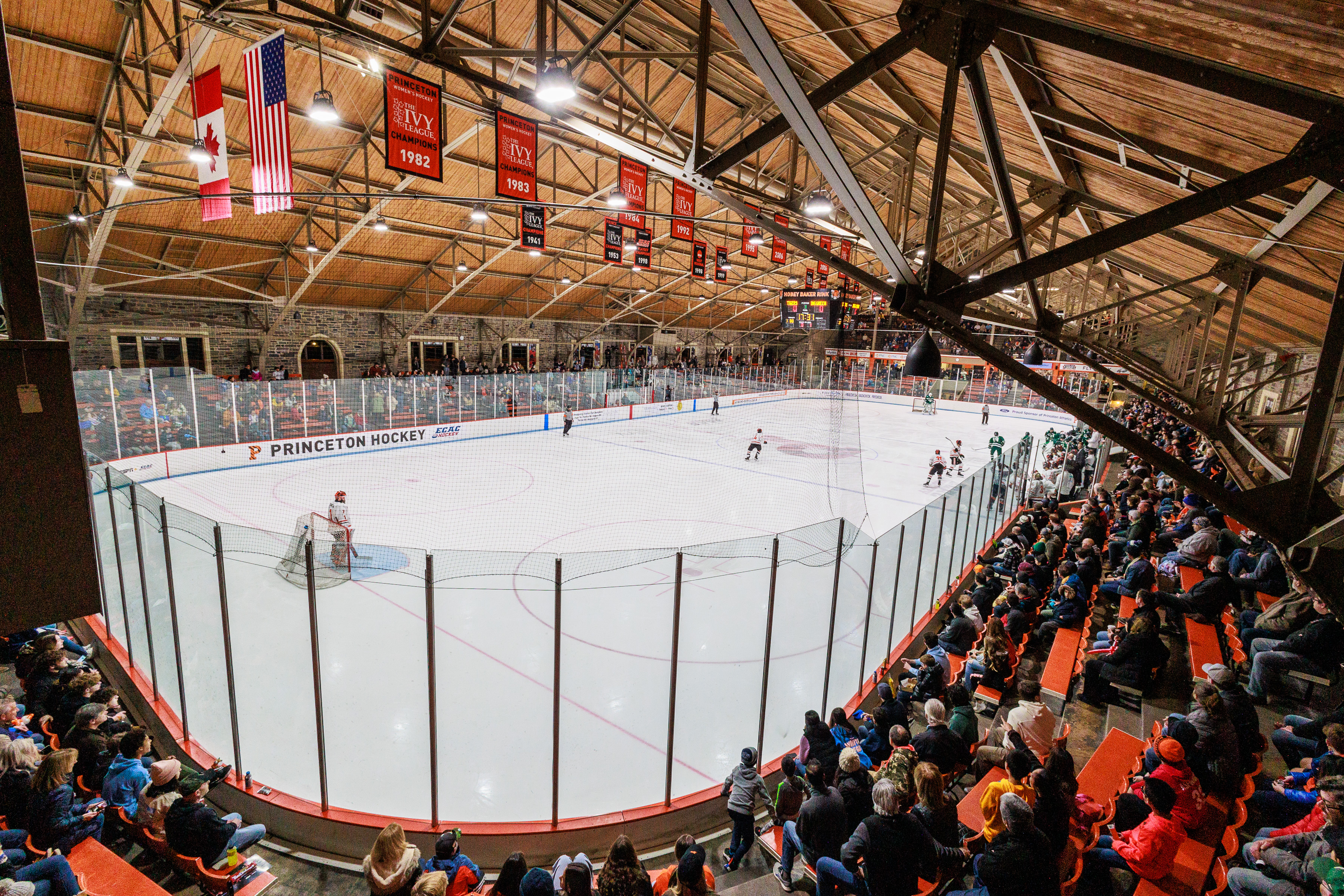
- Hobey Baker Rink in 2024
- Interactive map of Hobey Baker Memorial Rink
- Location: Princeton, New Jersey
- Owner: Princeton University
- Operator: Princeton University
- Capacity: 2,054 (hockey)
- Surface: 200x85 ft (hockey)

Construction
- Groundbreaking: 1922
- Opened: January 5, 1923

Tenants
- Princeton Tigers (men's and women's ice hockey)

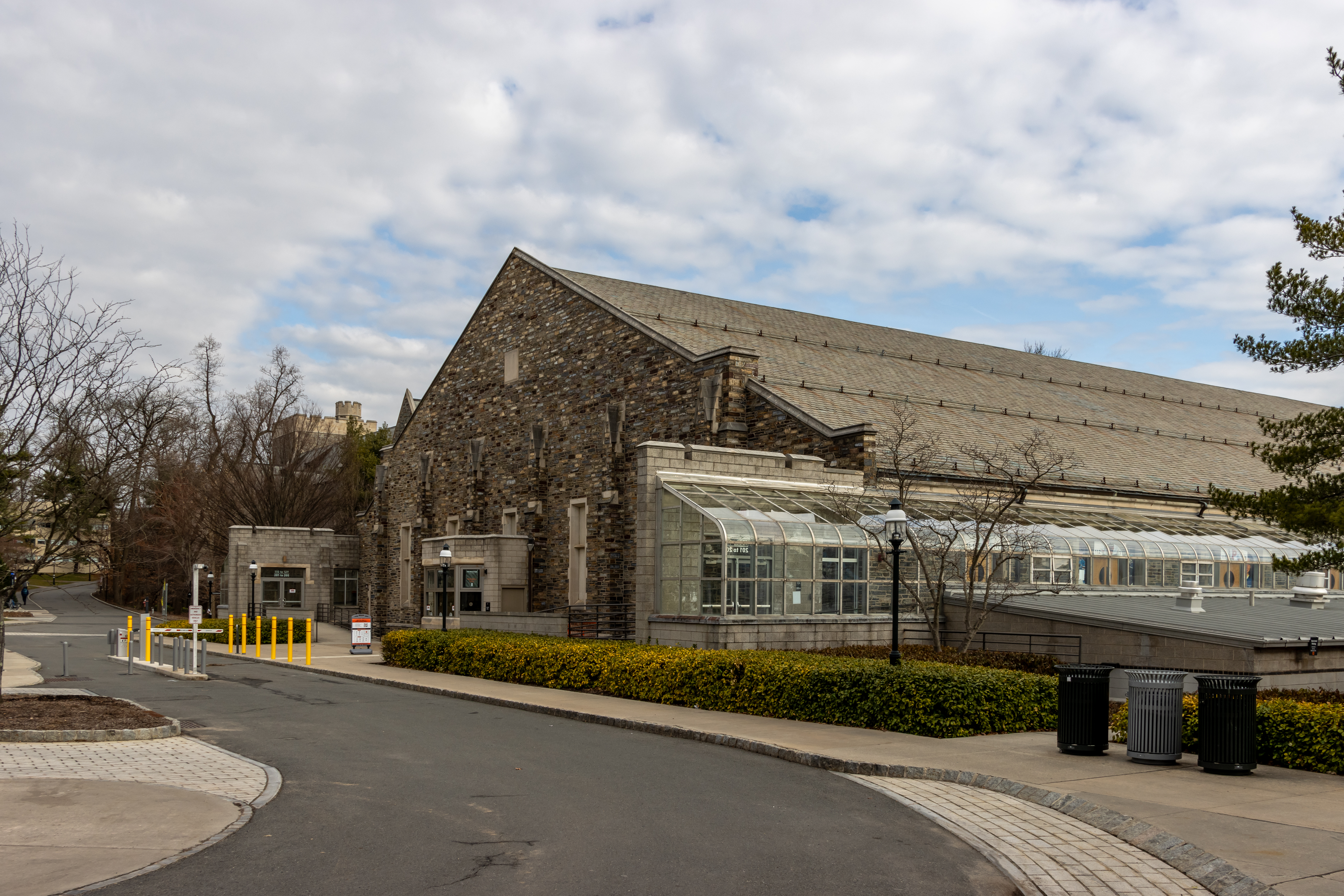
Exterior

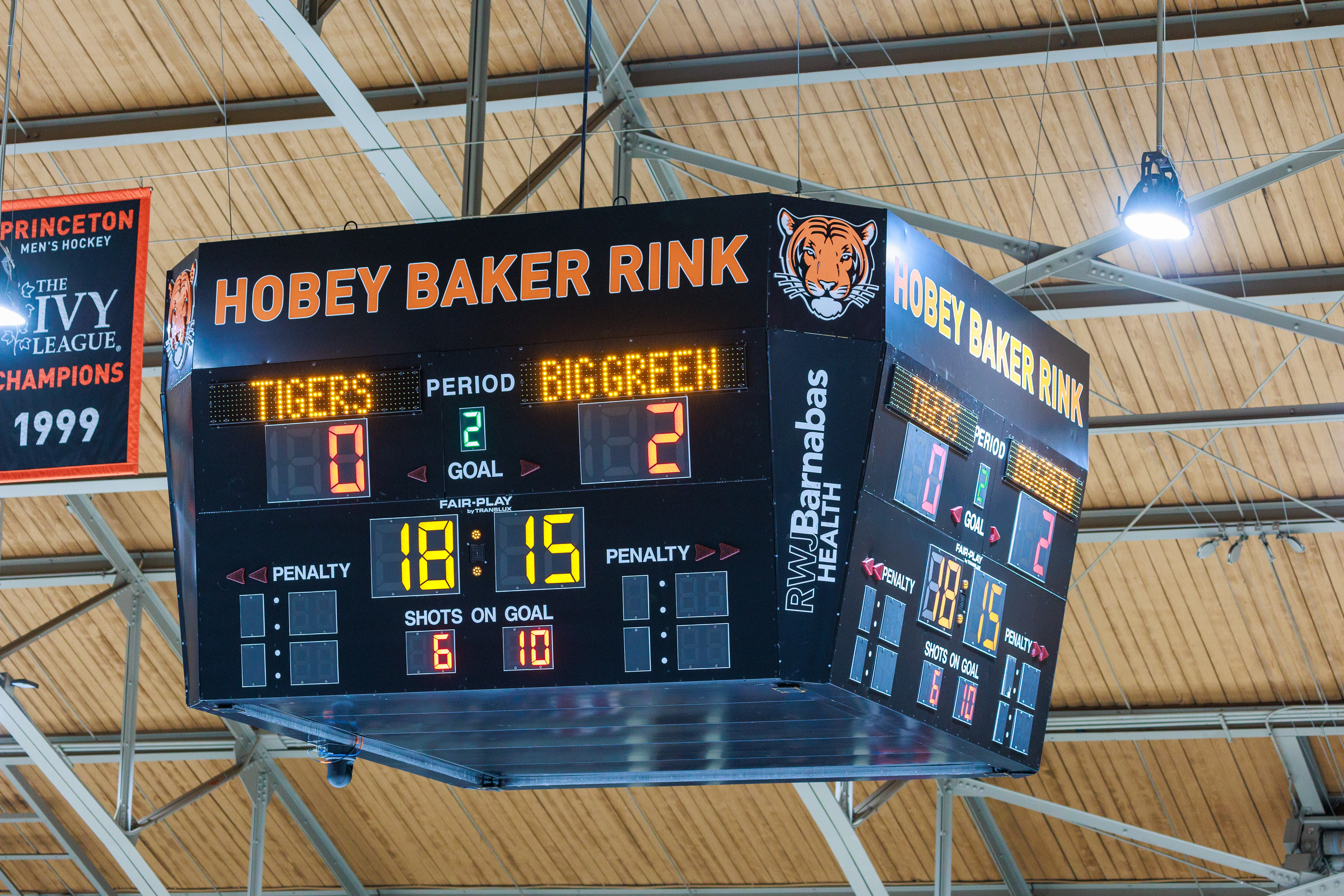
Scoreboard

Hobey Baker Memorial Rink is a 2,054-seat hockey arena in Princeton, New Jersey. It is home to the Princeton University Tigers men's and women's ice hockey teams as well as the venue for club and intramural hockey teams, intramural broomball, figure skating and recreational skating. It is the only ice skating rink on the Princeton University campus.

== Description and history ==
The rink is named in honor of former Princeton star Hobart A.H. "Hobey" Baker, '14. Baker was a football and hockey star who died shortly after World War I. In December 1921, it was decided to build an on-campus arena for the hockey team, and to name it after Baker.

It is the oldest arena still in use in NCAA Division I hockey, following the closure and demolition of Matthews Arena at Northeastern University; however, Northeastern only began playing at Matthews Arena in 1930, giving Princeton the distinction of being the school that has played in its current home the longest.

After the fire that destroyed University Gymnasium in 1944 the basketball team played at the rink while Dillon Gymnasium was being built.

Near the end of September 2017, the rink hosted its first, and, as of 2026, only, women's professional game, as the then-Metropolitan Riveters of the National Women's Hockey League took on visiting Luleå HF of the Swedish Women's Hockey League; Luleå won the game, 4-2, winning the first game of the Champions Cup, which had been planned to be an annual series, but would only result in one more three-game series held over in Sweden, the following year, which the Swedish team would also win.

=== Renovations ===
While the game experience in the rink is largely unaltered since the building opened, many upgrades and renovations have been performed behind the scenes for players and spectator comfort.

Efforts to modernize the arena began in the mid-1970s with major improvements including the addition of locker rooms, a skate sharpening room and a stick storage room in 1981, a new scoreboard and lighting improvements in 1984 and a renovation of the roof in 2002.

2016 season saw the introduction of a new sound system in the rink, as well as a team video room, including a smart board and theater-style seating. The men's and women's locker rooms were renovated in 2017, and a new scoreboard was installed in 2018.

A major renovation of the rink occurred during the summer of 2025 which included replacement of the ice plant, rink floor, boards, glass, roof, HVAC systems, and electrical systems.

== See also ==
- Hobey Baker Award
