= Boston College Eagles men's ice hockey =

College hockey team in Boston MA

- Current season
- University: Boston College
- Conference: Hockey East
- First season: 1917–18
- Head coach: Greg Brown; 4th season, 75–30–9 (.697)
- Assistant coaches: Mike Ayers; Brendan Buckley; Paul Carey
- Arena: Kelley Rink at Conte Forum; Chestnut Hill, Massachusetts
- Colors: Maroon and gold
- Fight song: For Boston
- Mascot: Baldwin the Eagle

NCAA tournament champions
- 1949, 2001, 2008, 2010, 2012

NCAA tournament runner-up
- 1965, 1978, 1998, 2000, 2006, 2007, 2024

NCAA tournament Frozen Four
- 1948, 1949, 1950, 1954, 1956, 1959, 1963, 1965, 1968, 1973, 1978, 1985, 1990, 1998, 1999, 2000, 2001, 2004, 2006, 2007, 2008, 2010, 2012, 2014, 2016, 2024

NCAA tournament appearances
- 1948, 1949, 1950, 1954, 1956, 1959, 1963, 1965, 1968, 1973, 1978, 1984, 1985, 1986, 1987, 1989, 1990, 1991, 1998, 1999, 2000, 2001, 2003, 2004, 2005, 2006, 2007, 2008, 2010, 2011, 2012, 2013, 2014, 2015, 2016, 2021, 2024, 2025

Conference tournament champions
- ECAC: 1965, 1978; Hockey East: 1987, 1990, 1998, 1999, 2001, 2005, 2007, 2008, 2010, 2011, 2012, 2024

Conference regular season champions
- ECAC: 1980, 1981, 1984; Hockey East: 1985, 1986, 1987, 1989, 1990, 1991, 2001, 2003, 2004, 2005, 2011, 2012, 2014, 2016, 2017, 2018, 2020, 2024, 2025

Current uniform

The Boston College Eagles men's ice hockey team is an NCAA Division I college ice hockey program that represents Boston College in Chestnut Hill, Massachusetts. The team has competed in Hockey East since 1984, having previously played in the ECAC. The Eagles have won five national championships, the most recent coming in 2012. Home games have been played at Kelley Rink at Conte Forum, named in honor of long–time BC hockey coach John "Snooks" Kelley, since 1986, having previously played at McHugh Forum. The Eagles are coached by former Eagles and NHL defenseman Greg Brown, who recently took over the reins after the retirement of Jerry York.

== Boston College hockey history ==
Boston College is among the top and oldest college hockey programs in the country. The Eagles first fielded a team from 1917 to 1929. School officials briefly dropped hockey as a cost–cutting measure in the wake of the Great Depression.

The modern era of hockey on the Heights began when former player John "Snooks" Kelley agreed to coach a small team of BC students who formed a team midway through the 1932–33 season. Apart from a short break during World War II, Kelley would lead the Eagles until 1972. He led the Eagles to their first national championship in 1949, along the way establishing Boston College as a perennial powerhouse in both regular season and post–season play.

From 1933 to 2022, BC hockey only had three other full–time coaches, Len Ceglarski, Steve Cedorchuk, and Jerry York, all Boston College alumni. They all continued to build upon the success began by Kelley. Ceglarski achieved over 400 career wins with the Eagles; York attained over 600 as head coach of the program, and retired with over 1,100 career wins overall, the most by any coach in collegiate history and only one over 1,000.

To date, BC has won 14 conference tournament titles, including 12 Hockey East titles, a conference record. Their most recent triumph in 2024 came after beating Boston University 6–2 in the championship game.

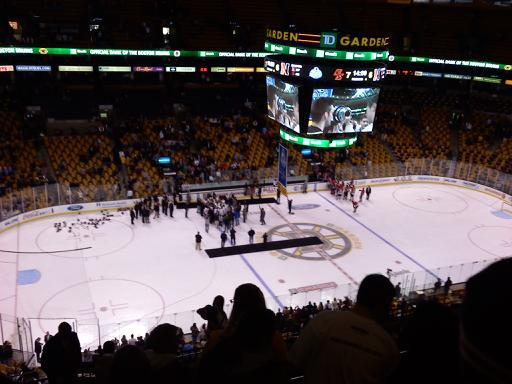
On ice celebrations after BC defeated Northeastern in the 2011 Beanpot final.

=== Post–season and Frozen Four ===
Boston College has made 36 NCAA tournament appearances, reaching the tournament's Frozen Four 25 times, second only to Michigan's 26 appearances.

Under John "Snooks" Kelley, BC advanced to the NCAA tournament three straight years from 1948 to 1950 (when the field was only four teams), winning the National Championship in 1949 after defeating Dartmouth 4–3 in Colorado Springs, CO.

After Jerry York took over as head coach in 1994, the Eagles began to work their way back to the NCAA tournament, having not qualified since 1991, and not having been to a Frozen Four since 1990. In 1998, four years after York became head coach, the Eagles were back in the national championship game, losing to the Michigan Wolverines men's ice hockey in Boston. BC was back in the national championship game in 2000, facing North Dakota. They lost the game 4–2, but returned the favor a year later in 2001, beating North Dakota 3–2 in overtime thanks to a sensational Krys Kolanos goal. This was the Eagles first national championship since 1949. The championship was all the more satisfying for BC as the Eagles defeated in the process the three teams that had eliminated them from the previous three tournaments (Michigan, Maine, North Dakota). The 2001 National Championship team contained current NHL standouts Brian Gionta, Brooks Orpik, and Chuck Kobasew.

The Eagles returned to the national championship game in 2006, facing the Wisconsin Badgers in Milwaukee, WI. The Eagles lost 2–1. A Brian Boyle shot was denied by the post as time expired, securing the win for the Badgers. The Eagles made it back to the national championship game in 2007, riding on the heels of a 13–game winning streak. However, they came up short again, losing 3–1 to the Michigan State Spartans.

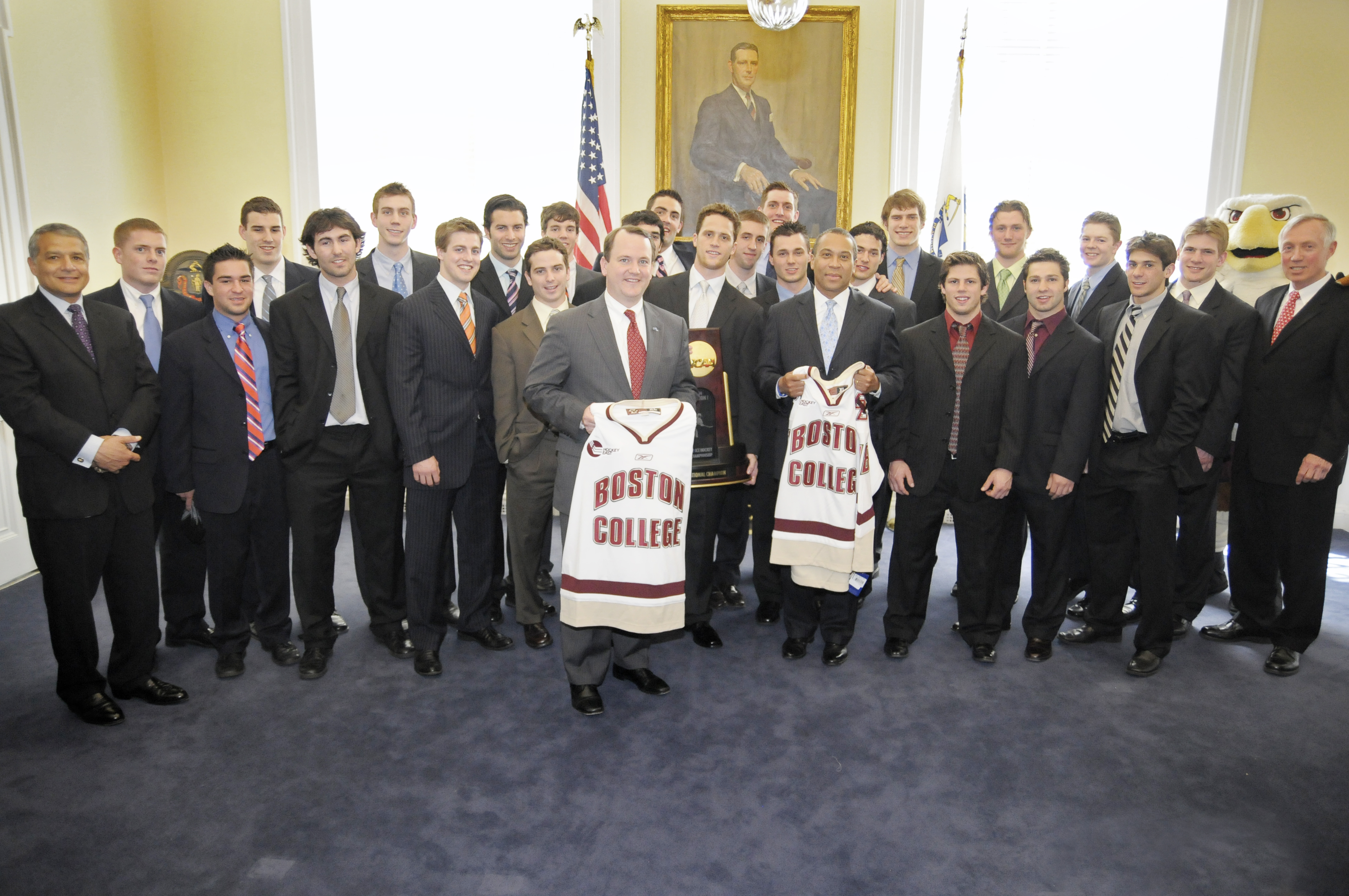
Boston College Eagles players and coaches celebrate their 2008 Frozen Four victory at the Massachusetts State House with Governor Deval Patrick and Lieutenant Governor Tim Murray

BC got back to the national championship game in 2008, disposing of Minnesota, Miami (OH), and North Dakota in the Frozen Four semifinals along the way. The 2008 tournament marked the third year in a row that the Eagles ending Miami's season, beating the top seeded Red Hawks 4–3 in overtime thanks to an acrobatic goal by freshman Joe Whitney. In the national championship game, the Eagles met the Notre Dame Fighting Irish, who had upset Michigan in the other semifinal. The Eagles won the contest by a score of 4–1, behind an MVP performance by Nathan Gerbe. The defeat of the Irish by BC has added fuel to the growing rivalry between Boston College and Notre Dame, carrying over to the ice what has been being fought on the gridiron for years between the two schools' football teams in the Holy War. The hockey rivalry, called the Holy War on Ice added the moniker "on ice" in reference to the aforementioned rivalry.

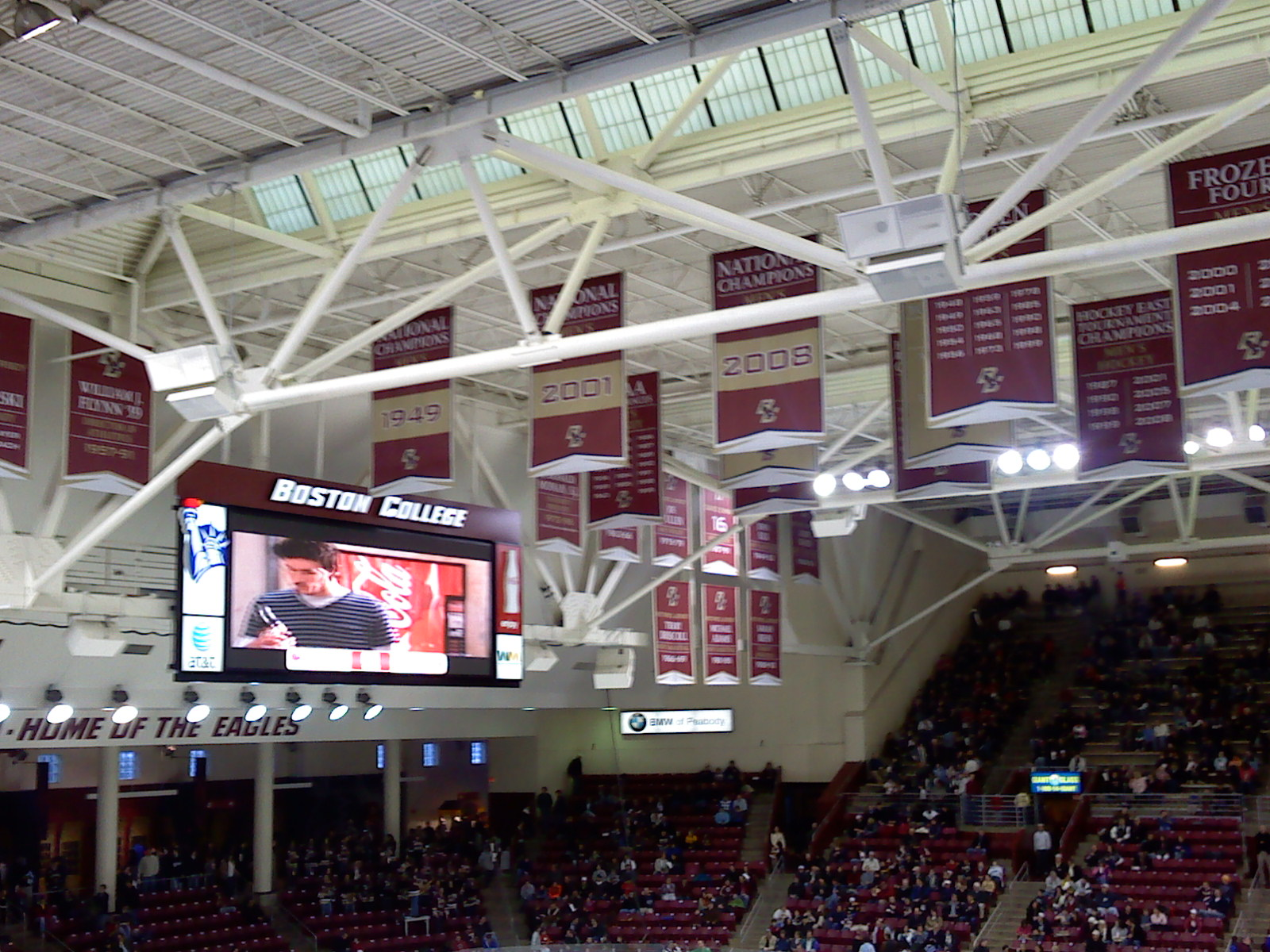
BC's National Championship banners at Kelley Rink prior to the 2010 championship.

After missing out on the 2009 tournament, BC returned in 2010 as a number one seed. The Eagles defeated Alaska and Yale in the Northeast Regional in Worcester, earning them a berth in the Frozen Four to be played at Ford Field in Detroit. BC defeated Miami (OH) 7–1 in the national semifinal, the fourth time in five years that the Eagles ended the RedHawks' season in the NCAA tournament. BC would face Wisconsin in the championship, a rematch of the 2006 title game. The Eagles avenged that loss by defeating the Badgers 5–0 behind a two–goal effort from sophomore Cam Atkinson and an MVP performance by senior Ben Smith, who would be named the Frozen Four's Most Outstanding Player. Junior John Muse became just the fourth goalie to record a shutout in a title game. The game was played before a record crowd of 37,592, the largest to attend an indoor hockey game.

After a first round loss to Colorado College in the 2011 tournament, BC once again returned to the Frozen Four on the heels of a 15–game winning streak in 2012. After dispatching Air Force and Minnesota–Duluth with two shutouts in the Northeast Regional in Worcester, they advanced to their 23rd Frozen Four played at the Tampa Bay Times Forum in Tampa, Florida. The continued their now 17–game winning streak, making quick work of Minnesota in a 6–1 rout thanks to the efforts of forward Chris Kreider and a 30–save performance by netminder Parker Milner. The Eagles would go on to win the national championship by defeating the Ferris State Bulldogs in a 4–1 victory, featuring a highlight–reel goal by rookie Johnny Gaudreau late in the 3rd to secure the Eagles' fifth national title. Kreider would go on to join the New York Rangers in the 2012 Stanley Cup playoffs, where he would score 5 goals and 7 points before ever playing a regular NHL season game, a feat unaccomplished by any player before him.

Once again, the Eagles would continue their every–other–year or even–numbered–years trend by missing out on the Frozen Four in the 2013 tournament via a 5–1 first round loss to Union College and returning the following year in 2014. After defeating Denver 6–2 and UMass Lowell 4–3 in Worcester, the Eagles advanced to their NCAA–leading 24th Frozen Four appearance played at the Wells Fargo Center in Philadelphia, having tied the record with Michigan. However, they would not continue to win the championship in their every–other–year trend, as they lost once again to Union in a close 5–4 match. Junior Johnny Gaudreau had a tremendous season, scoring 80 points in 40 games, with a 31–game point streak during the season, and was named the Hobey Baker winner, the third in school history.

The Eagles' season in 2014–15 was not up to their usual standards. Despite a respectable 21–14–3 record and finishing 2nd in the conference, the Eagles were bounced out of their 34th NCAA tournament bid in the first round, a 5–2 loss to Denver, who took revenge for the previous year's defeat.

Again finding success in even–numbered years, the Eagles advanced to an NCAA–record 25th Frozen Four in 2016 after dispatching Harvard 4–1 and Minnesota–Duluth 3–2 in the Northeast regional, held in Worcester. After heading to Amalie Arena in Tampa, FL for the Frozen Four, however, they would fail to advance to the title game at the hands of the Quinnipiac Bobcats, who defeated the Eagles 3–2 in the programs' first–ever meeting. Junior goaltender Thatcher Demko was named a Hobey Baker hat trick finalist as well as the winner of the Mike Richter Award after leading the NCAA with a school–record 10 shutouts during the season.

2017 was a down year for the Eagles, as they failed to qualify for the NCAA tournament for the first time since 2009. Although, they did finish with a strong 21–15–4 (13–6–3) record and a share of the regular season conference title (shared with UMass Lowell and Boston University). They also made it to the Hockey East tournament championship, but would fall 4–3 to the River Hawks of Lowell, ending their effort to earn an auto–bid into the NCAA tournament.

In 2022 Jerry York would retire from his position, and former defenseman Greg Brown would take the helm of the Eagles. In his second season, he would lead the star-studded Eagles to the National Championship game at the Xcel Energy Center. The team was loaded with future NHL talent, Will Smith, Cutter Gauthier, Ryan Leonard, Jacob Fowler and Gabe Perreault were all among the Eagles ranks. The top-seeded Eagles would shut-out powerful Michigan Wolverines team 4-0 in the semifinal before being shutout themselves in the title game by a well led Denver team 2-0. The Eagles would again return to the tournament in the following 2023-2024 season, but would fall short to Denver again in the Manchester Regional Final.

Since 1998, the Eagles have qualified for the NCAA tournament 20 times, making it to 13 Frozen Fours, Nine National Championship games, and have won four national titles.

== Championships ==
=== National Championships ===
Year	Champion	Score	Runner–up	City	Arena
1949	Boston College	4–3	Dartmouth	Colorado Springs, CO	Broadmoor Arena
2001	Boston College	3–2 (OT)	North Dakota	Albany, NY	Pepsi Arena
2008	Boston College	4–1	Notre Dame	Denver, CO	Pepsi Center
2010	Boston College	5–0	Wisconsin	Detroit, MI	Ford Field
2012	Boston College	4–1	Ferris State	Tampa, FL	Tampa Bay Times Forum

Runners–up in 1965, 1978, 1998, 2000, 2006, 2007 and 2024.

=== Hockey East Tournament championships ===
Year	Champion	Score	Runner–up	Notes
1987	Boston College	4–2	Maine	Hockey East regular–season champions
1990	Boston College	4–3	Maine	Hockey East regular–season champions
1998	Boston College	3–2	Maine	lost to Michigan in National Championship game
1999	Boston College	5–4 (OT)	New Hampshire	lost to Maine in Frozen Four
2001	Boston College	5–3	Providence	defeated North Dakota in National Championship game
2005	Boston College	3–1	New Hampshire	Hockey East regular–season champions
2007	Boston College	5–2	New Hampshire	lost to Michigan State in National Championship game
2008	Boston College	4–0	Vermont	defeated Notre Dame in National Championship game
2010	Boston College	7–6 (OT)	Maine	defeated Wisconsin in National Championship game
2011	Boston College	5–3	Merrimack	Hockey East regular–season champions
2012	Boston College	4–1	Maine	defeated Ferris State in National Championship game
2024	Boston College	6–2	Boston University	lost to Denver in National Championship Game

Runners–up in 1985, 1986, 1989, 2000, 2006, 2017, and 2019

=== Hockey East regular–season championships ===
Year	Conference record	Overall record	Coach
1984–85	24–9–1	28–15–2	Len Ceglarski
1985–86	23–9–2	26–13–3	Len Ceglarski
1986–87	26–6–0	31–8–0	Len Ceglarski
1988–89	16–6–4	25–11–4	Len Ceglarski
1989–90	15–6–0	28–13–1	Len Ceglarski
1990–91	16–5–0	27–12–0	Len Ceglarski
2000–01	17–5–2	33–8–2	Jerry York
2002–03†	16–6–2	24–11–4	Jerry York
2003–04	17–4–3	29–9–4	Jerry York
2004–05	14–3–7	26–7–7	Jerry York
2010–11	20–6–1	30–8–1	Jerry York
2011–12	19–7–1	33–10–1	Jerry York
2013–14	16–2–2	28–8–4	Jerry York
2015–16‡	15–2–5	28–8–5	Jerry York
2016–17#	13–6–3	21–15–4	Jerry York
2017–18	18–6–0	20–14–3	Jerry York
2019–20	17–6–1	24–8–2	Jerry York
2023–24	20–3–1	31–5–1	Greg Brown

† Shared with New Hampshire
‡ Shared with Providence
# Shared with Boston University and UMass–Lowell

- The Eagles achieved the highest finish in Hockey East conference standings during the 2020–21 season, however, no regular season title was officially awarded, due to disparities in scheduling caused by the COVID-19 pandemic.

Runners–up in 1997–98, 2005–06, 2006–07, 2009–10, 2012–13, 2014–15

=== ECAC Tournament championships ===
Year	Champion	Score	Runner–up	Notes
1965	Boston College	6–2	Brown	lost to Michigan Tech in National Championship game
1978	Boston College	4–2	Providence	lost to Boston University in National Championship game

Runners–up in 1963, 1968, and 1973

=== ECAC regular–season championships ===
Year	Conference record	Overall record	Coach
1979–80	18–3–1 (East)	25–7–2	Len Ceglarski
1980–81	13–6–3 (East)	20–8–3	Len Ceglarski
1983–84†	15–6–0 (East)	26–13–0	Len Ceglarski

† Shared with Boston University

Runners–up in 1964–65, 1968–69, 1972–73

=== The Beanpot ===
See: The Beanpot

BC competes in the annual Beanpot tournament with fellow Boston–area schools Boston University, Harvard, and Northeastern. The Eagles have won 21 Beanpots, their most recent being the 2026 tournament that saw the Eagles defeat Boston University.

Year	Champion	Score	Runner–up	Coach
1954	Boston College	4–1	Harvard	John "Snooks" Kelley
1956	Boston College	4–2	Harvard	John "Snooks" Kelley
1957	Boston College	5–4 (OT)	Boston University	John "Snooks" Kelley
1959	Boston College	7–4	Boston University	John "Snooks" Kelley
1961	Boston College	4–2	Harvard	John "Snooks" Kelley
1963	Boston College	3–1	Harvard	John "Snooks" Kelley
1964	Boston College	6–5	Boston University	John "Snooks" Kelley
1965	Boston College	5–4	Boston University	John "Snooks" Kelley
1976	Boston College	6–3	Boston University	Len Ceglarski
1983	Boston College	8–2	Northeastern	Len Ceglarski
1994	Boston College	2–1 (OT)	Harvard	Steve Cedorchuck
2001	Boston College	5–3	Boston University	Jerry York
2004	Boston College	2–1 (OT)	Boston University	Jerry York
2008	Boston College	6–5 (OT)	Harvard	Jerry York
2010	Boston College	4–3	Boston University	Jerry York
2011	Boston College	7–6 (OT)	Northeastern	Jerry York
2012	Boston College	3–2 (OT)	Boston University	Jerry York
2013	Boston College	6–3	Northeastern	Jerry York
2014	Boston College	4–1	Northeastern	Jerry York
2016	Boston College	1–0 (OT)	Boston University	Jerry York
2026	Boston College	6–2	Boston University	Greg Brown

Runners–up in 1955, 1970, 1973, 1979, 1980, 1981, 1982, 1986, 1991, 1995, 1997, 2000, 2003, 2006, 2007, 2019, and 2025

== Rivals ==
=== Boston University Terriers ===
Boston College's chief and biggest rival is the Boston University Terriers, separated by a mere four miles on Boston's Commonwealth Avenue. The rivalry is often referred to as the Green Line Rivalry, as the MBTA Green Line is the principal mode of transportation between the two schools. BC–BU is considered one of the top rivalries in college sports as well as the number one rivalry in college hockey. The rivalry has been renewed annually since the 1946–47 season, and the two teams have met at least twice a year since 1949. The schools regularly meet in Hockey East play three times each season. Besides meeting in conference play, the two schools often meet in the annual Beanpot tournament. Although Boston University has historically dominated the tournament, Boston College has commanded the cross town competition in recent years, winning five titles in a row from 2010 to 2014.

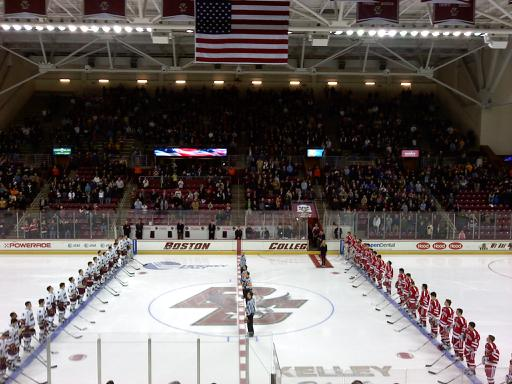
BC and BU before the start of a game at Kelley Rink on January 22, 2010.

The two schools have also met in NCAA tournament play. In one of their most memorable meetings, Boston College skated to a 5–0 victory against the top seeded Terriers in the 2006 NCAA Men's Division I Ice Hockey tournament Northeast Regional Final. The Eagles and Terriers have met once in the NCAA tournament championship game in 1978, with BU winning 5–3 in Providence, RI. BC and BU have combined for ten national championships, with each school having won five. Most recently, in the 2024 Hockey East men's tournament, the top-seeded Boston College Eagles defeated the second-ranked Boston University Terriers in a 6–2 victory, winning the Hockey East Men's Championship for the first time in 12 years.

Games between the two schools are also highlighted by the intensity of the two school's student sections, the BC Superfans and the BU Dog Pound. The BU students often shout their infamous "BC Sucks" or "Sunday School" chants while the Superfans will retort with "Safety School", "Sucks to BU", or "BC Rejects" at their counterparts.

The two schools have met on the ice over 250 times, leading the rivalry to be one of the most historic and well known in college hockey. The Terriers have the edge in wins in the series; currently the record sits at 139–133 (with 21 ties).

Boston College and Boston University faced off in Hockey East play at Fenway Park on January 8, 2010. The game was the first men's college hockey game played at Fenway Park, with a women's game between Northeastern and New Hampshire played earlier in the day. BU edged BC for a 3–2 win.

=== North Dakota Fighting Hawks ===
Boston College has developed a national rivalry with the North Dakota Fighting Hawks (formerly the Fighting Sioux), a rivalry fueled by each teams post–season success. Boston College ended North Dakota's season in three straight Frozen Fours, most recently winning 6–1 in 2008 en route to a national championship, while in the 2005 tournament the Sioux beat the Eagles in the East Regional finals, 6–3.

In 2000, the Sioux triumphed over BC 4–2 in the national championship game in Rhode Island. A year later, in 2001, the Eagles and Hawks met again in Albany, this time with BC prevailing 3–2 in overtime. In 1963, the Sioux beat Boston College by a score of 8–2 in the National Semifinal game. Two years later in 1965, Boston College defeated North Dakota 4–3 in the National Semifinal game.

On October 10, 2007, the two teams squared off in a regular season match best remembered for the unusual circumstances in which the game ended. Midway through the second period, the power went out at BC's Conte Forum. When power was restored, the ice surface began to melt, leading to the game being called after two periods due to the hazardous playing conditions. The game ended 0–0.

The Eagles and Hawks last met in the championship game of the 2011 Ice Breaker Tournament at the Ralph Engelstad Arena, with BC defeating North Dakota 6–2.

=== New Hampshire Wildcats ===
The rivalry between Boston College and the New Hampshire Wildcats has grown in recent years due to the success of the two programs. UNH leads the all–time Hockey East regular season series over BC. The Eagles, however, hold a distinct advantage in Hockey East tournament play, holding an 8–3 record. Most recently, in the 2009 Hockey East Tournament, UNH hosted BC in the quarterfinals on their home ice at the Whittemore Center. UNH had the chance to end BC's season and their hopes of reaching the NCAA tournament to defend their national title. BC won the best–of–three series 2–0.

During the 2007–2008 season, the Wildcats swept the season series and won the Hockey East regular season championship. The two teams met in the semifinals of the Hockey East tournament, with the top–seeded and favored UNH squad jumping out to a 4–1 midway through the second period. The Eagles mounted a comeback, however, and won the game 5–4 in triple overtime.

Both UNH and BC have also competed closely for the Hockey East regular season championship. In the 2009–2010 season, the Wildcats cemented the title on the final weekend of the season, earning a 3–3 tie against the Eagles at the Whittemore Center in the penultimate game season after BC jumped out to a 3–0 lead. In the 2010–2011 season, the regular season title was again decided on the final weekend, with the Eagles, sitting in second place, sweeping a home–and–home series against the Wildcats, earning their 11th regular season championship.

=== Notre Dame Fighting Irish ===
Boston College and the Notre Dame Fighting Irish first met on the ice in 1969, and have faced–off annually since 1994. BC leads the all–time series 24–21–2, including beating the Irish in the 2008 National Championship game, as the Eagles captured their third national title in a 4–1 victory. After Notre Dame joined Hockey East in 2014, the rivalry evolved into a conference rivalry as well as a school rivalry. In their first meeting as conference foes, Boston College defeated the Irish 4–3 on January 4, 2013, played at Fenway Park during the league's third Frozen Fenway exhibit. The two teams also met in the Hockey East tournament during the Irish's first year of league membership, where Notre Dame defeated the Eagles in the best–of–three Quarterfinals at BC's Kelley Rink. The in–conference rivalry was short–lived however, as the Irish's stay in Hockey East lasted only four season, as they left to join the Big Ten Conference in 2017–18. The teams played 11 games as conference foes, with Notre Dame edging out the Eagles 6–5 during that time.

The rivalry is commonly referred to as "The Holy War on Ice," a take on the name of the football rivalry between the two schools.

== Awards and honors ==
=== Hockey Hall of Fame ===
- Brian Leetch (2009)
- Joe Mullen (2000)
- Jerry York (2019)

=== United States Hockey Hall of Fame ===
- Len Ceglarski (1992)
- John Cunniff (2003)
- Bill Guerin (2013)
- Craig Janney (2016)
- John Kelley (1974)
- Brian Leetch (2008)
- Joe Mullen (1998)
- Jerry York (2020)

=== National ===
==== Individual awards ====
Hobey Baker Memorial Award

- Johnny Gaudreau: 2014
- Mike Mottau: 2000
- David Emma: 1991

Mike Richter Award

- Thatcher Demko: 2016
- Jacob Fowler: 2025

Tim Taylor Award

- Alex Newhook: 2020

Spencer Penrose Award

- Len Ceglarski: 1973, 1985
- John Kelley: 1959, 1972

USCHO Coach of the Year

- Jerry York: 2010

USA Hockey National College Player of the Year

- Johnny Gaudreau: 2014
- Nathan Gerbe: 2008
- Mike Mottau: 2000

NCAA Scoring Champion

- Will Smith: 2024
- Johnny Gaudreau: 2014
- Nathan Gerbe: 2008
- Marty Reasoner: 1998
- Tim Sheehy: 1970
- Jerry York: 1967
- John Cunniff: 1965

NCAA tournament Most Outstanding Player

- Parker Milner: 2012
- Ben Smith: 2010
- Nathan Gerbe: 2008
- Chuck Kobasew: 2001

==== All–Americans ====
AHCA First Team All–Americans

- 2024–25: Jacob Fowler, G; Ryan Leonard, F
- 2023–24: Jacob Fowler, G; Cutter Gauthier, F; Will Smith, F
- 2020–21: Spencer Knight, G; Matt Boldy, F
- 2013-14: Johnny Gaudreau, F; Kevin Hayes, F
- 2012-13: Johnny Gaudreau, F; Steven Whitney, F
- 2011-12: Brian Dumoulin, D
- 2010-11: Brian Dumoulin, D; Cam Atkinson, F
- 2007-08: Nathan Gerbe, F
- 2006-07: Brian Boyle, F
- 2005-06: Chris Collins, F; Peter Harrold, D; Cory Schneider, G
- 2004-05: Andrew Alberts, D; Patrick Eaves, F
- 2003-04: Andrew Alberts, D; Tony Voce, F
- 2002-03: Ben Eaves, F
- 2000-01: Bobby Allen, D; Brian Gionta, F
- 1999-00: Jeff Farkas, F; Brian Gionta, F; Mike Mottau, D
- 1998-99: Brian Gionta, F; Mike Mottau, D;
- 1997-98: Marty Reasoner, F
- 1990-91: David Emma, F
- 1989-90: Greg Brown, D; David Emma, F; Steve Heinze, F
- 1988-89: Greg Brown, D
- 1986-87: Craig Janney, F; Brian Leetch, D
- 1985-86: Scott Harlow, F
- 1979-80: Bill Army, F
- 1978-79: Joe Mullen, F
- 1977-78: Joe Mullen, F
- 1972-73: Tom Mellor, D
- 1969-70: Tim Sheehy, F
- 1968-69: Paul Hurley, D; Tim Sheehy, F
- 1966-67: Jerry York, F
- 1965-66: John Cunniff, F
- 1964-65: John Cunniff, F
- 1962-63: Jack Leetch, F
- 1961-62: Bill Hogan, F
- 1960-61: Red Martin, D
- 1959-60: Red Martin, D
- 1958-59: Joe Jangro, D
- 1953-54: Bob Kiley, D
- 1952-53: Wellington Burtnett, F
- 1949-50: Warren Lewis, F
- 1948-49: Butch Songin, D
- 1947-48: Butch Songin, D

=== Hockey East ===
==== Individual awards ====
Player of the Year

- Spencer Knight: 2021
- Thatcher Demko: 2016 (shared with Kevin Boyle)
- Johnny Gaudreau: 2013, 2014
- Chris Collins: 2006
- Patrick Eaves: 2005
- Ben Eaves: 2003 (Shared with Mike Ayers)
- Brian Gionta: 2001
- Mike Mottau: 1900 (Shared with Ty Conklin)
- David Emma: 1991
- Greg Brown: 1989, 1990
- Brian Leetch: 1987
- Scott Harlow: 1986

Rookie of the Year

- Nikita Nesterenko: 2021 (shared with Josh Lopina)
- Alex Newhook: 2020
- Logan Hutsko: 2018
- Colin White: 2016
- Chuck Kobasew: 2001
- Brian Gionta: 1998
- Marty Reasoner: 1996
- Ian Moran: 1992 (shared with Craig Darby)
- Brian Leetch: 1987
- Ken Hodge, Jr.: 1985

Best Defensive Defenseman

- Eamon Powell: 2025
- Drew Helleson: 2021
- Casey Fitzgerald: 2018
- Steve Santini: 2016
- Patrick Wey: 2013
- Brian Dumoulin: 2011, 2012
- Peter Harrold: 2006
- Andrew Alberts: 2004
- Bobby Allen: 2001
- Mike Mottau: 2000

Best Defensive Forward

- Marc McLaughlin: 2021
- Austin Cangelosi: 2017
- Bill Arnold: 2014
- Matt Greene: 2008
- Joe Rooney: 2007
- Mike Lephart: 2001

Goaltending Champion

- Jacob Fowler: 2024
- Spencer Knight: 2021
- Thatcher Demko: 2014
- Parker Milner: 2012
- John Muse: 2011
- Cory Schneider: 2006
- Matti Kaltiainen: 2003, 2005
- Scott Clemmensen: 2000
- Scott LaGrand: 1991
- David Littman: 1989
- Scott Gordon: 1986

Scoring Champion

- Ryan Leonard: 2025
- Johnny Gaudreau: 2013, 2014
- Brian Boyle: 2007
- Chris Collins: 2006
- Tony Voce: 2004
- Ryan Shannon: 2004
- Ben Eaves: 2003
- Brian Gionta: 2001
- Marty Reasoner: 1998
- David Emma: 1990, 1991
- Tim Sweeney: 1989
- Craig Janney: 1987
- Scott Harlow: 1986

Bob Kullen Coach of the Year

- Greg Brown: 2024
- Jerry York: 2004, 2011, 2014, 2018, 2021
- Len Ceglarski: 1985

William Flynn Tournament Most Valuable Player

- Will Smith: 2024
- Johnny Gaudreau: 2012
- Cam Atkinson: 2011
- Matt Lombardi: 2010
- Nathan Gerbe: 2008
- Brock Bradford: 2007
- Brian Boyle: 2005
- Chuck Kobasew: 2001
- Blake Bellefeuille: 1999
- Marty Reasoner: 1998
- Scott LaGrand: 1990
- Brian Leetch: 1987

=== ECAC Hockey ===
==== Individual awards ====
Player of the Year

- Tom Mellor: 1973
- Tim Sheehy: 1970
- John Cunniff: 1965

Rookie of the Year

- Paul Skidmore: 1976
- Tom Mellor: 1970
- John Cunniff: 1964

== Statistical leaders ==
=== Career scoring leaders ===
GP = Games played; G = Goals; A = Assists; Pts = Points; PIM = Penalty minutes

Player	Years	GP	G	A	Pts	PIM
David Emma	1987–1991	147	112	127	239	
Brian Gionta	1997–2001	164	123	109	232	
Scott Harlow	1982–1986	149	105	118	223	
Joe Mullen	1975–1979	110	110	102	212	
Richie Smith	1972–1976	110	94	104	198	
Dan Shea	1984–1988	155	66	124	190	
Jeff Farkas	1996–2000	159	88	102	190	
Tim Sheehy	1967–1970	80	74	111	185	
Paul Barrett	1974–1978	121	78	99	177	
Johnny Gaudreau	2011–2014	119	78	97	175	

=== Career goaltending leaders ===
GP = Games played; Min = Minutes played; GA = Goals against; SO = Shutouts; SV% = Save percentage; GAA = Goals against average

Since 1932

Player	Years	GP	Min	W	L	T	GA	SO	SV%	GAA
Matti Kaltiainen	2001–2005	136	6572	66	32	10	224	8	.908	2.05
Thatcher Demko	2013–2016	124	5915	62	26	10	205	13	.928	2.08
Cory Schneider	2004–2007	123	5861	65	25	7	201	15	.926	2.09
Parker Milner	2009–2013	119	5448	64	20	5	203	6	.919	2.24
John Muse	2007–2011	170	8651	89	39	16	346	12	.914	2.40

Statistics current through the start of the 2018–19 season.

=== Records ===
- Brian Gionta is BC's all–time leading goal–scorer, netting 123 goals in his college career.
- Mike Mottau is BC's all–time assists leader, with 130 in his career at the Heights.
- David Emma is BC's all–time leading scorer, with 239 points in his four years.
- Rob Scuderi has played in the most games at BC, appearing in an Eagles uniform 168 times in his four–year career at Boston College.
- Chuck Kobasew is tied for first place in the number of game–winning–goals scored in a season with ten in 2000–01.

For more Boston College stats, visit Boston College on Internet Hockey Database.

- On March 16, 1985, BC goalie Scott Gordon and Chris Terreri (playing with Providence College) both placed water bottles on the top of their nets. This would be the first time ever that goalies would place water bottles on the top of nets in a hockey game.

== Head coaching records ==
As of the end of the 2024–25 season.

Tenure	Coach	Years	Record	Pct.
1917–1919	Robert Fowler	2	4–2	.667
1919–1920	Walter Falvey	1	6–1	.857
1920–1923, 1925–1927	Fred Rocque	5	32–18–3	.632
1923–1925	Charles Foote	2	15–16–4	.486
1927–1929	Sonny Foley	2	7–13–1	.357
1932–1942, 1946–1972	John "Snooks" Kelley	36	501–247–15	.666
1942–1943	John Temple	1	7–2	.778
1945–1946	Joseph Glavin	1	1–2	.333
1972–1992	Len Ceglarski	20	420–242–27	.629
1992–1994	Steve Cedorchuk	2	24–40–10	.392
1994–2022	Jerry York	28	656–347–94	.642
2022–present	Greg Brown	3	75–30–9	.697
Totals	12 coaches	103 seasons	1,748–960–163	.637

== Current roster ==
As of September 7, 2025.

No.	Nat.	Player	Class	Pos	Height	Weight	DoB	Hometown	Previous team	NHL rights
1	(Canada)	Louka Cloutier	Freshman	G	6' 2" (1.88 m)	168 lb (76 kg)	2006-08-22	Sherbrooke, Quebec	Chicago Steel (USHL)	COL, 132nd overall 2024
2	(Sweden)	Kristian Kostadinski	Freshman	D	6' 6" (1.98 m)	220 lb (100 kg)	2005-05-20	Göteborg, Sweden	USNTDP (USHL)	BOS, 220th overall 2023
4	(United States)	Teddy Stiga	Sophomore	F	5' 10" (1.78 m)	179 lb (81 kg)	2006-04-05	Sudbury, Massachusetts	USNTDP (USHL)	NSH, 55th overall 2024
5	(United States)	Drew Fortescue	Junior	D	6' 2" (1.88 m)	170 lb (77 kg)	2005-04-28	Pearl River, New York	USNTDP (USHL)	NYR, 90th overall 2023
7	(United States)	Will Skahan	Sophomore	D	6' 4" (1.93 m)	216 lb (98 kg)	2006-05-14	Orange, California	USNTDP (USHL)	UTA, 65th overall 2024
8	(United States)	Lukas Gustafsson (C)	Senior	D	5' 10" (1.78 m)	190 lb (86 kg)	2002-12-16	Atlanta, Georgia	Chicago Steel (USHL)	—
10	(United States)	James Hagens	Sophomore	F	5' 10" (1.78 m)	172 lb (78 kg)	2006-11-03	Hauppauge, New York	USNTDP (USHL)	BOS, 7th overall 2025
11	(United States)	Michael Hagens	Sophomore	D	5' 11" (1.8 m)	170 lb (77 kg)	2002-08-07	Hauppauge, New York	Chicago Steel (USHL)	—
12	(United States)	Jake Sondreal	Sophomore	F	5' 11" (1.8 m)	163 lb (74 kg)	2004-02-19	Woodbury, Minnesota	Dubuque Fighting Saints (USHL)	—
14	(United States)	Landan Resendes	Freshman	F	5' 10" (1.78 m)	183 lb (83 kg)	2005-12-10	Marlborough, Massachusetts	Youngstown Phantoms (USHL)	—
15	(Sweden)	Oskar Jellvik	Junior	F	5' 11" (1.8 m)	180 lb (82 kg)	2003-02-08	Täby, Sweden	Djurgårdens J20 (J20 Nationell)	BOS, 149th overall 2021
17	(United States)	Aram Minnetian	Junior	D	5' 11" (1.8 m)	194 lb (88 kg)	2005-03-19	Woodcliff Lake, New Jersey	USNTDP (USHL)	DAL, 125th overall 2023
18	(United States)	Paul Davey	Senior	F	6' 2" (1.88 m)	195 lb (88 kg)	2003-01-11	Greenwich, Connecticut	Des Moines Buccaneers (USHL)	—
19	(United States)	Brady Berard (C)	Senior	F	6' 1" (1.85 m)	198 lb (90 kg)	2004-02-26	East Greenwich, Rhode Island	Providence (HEA)	—
22	(United States)	Will Vote	Junior	F	5' 8" (1.73 m)	161 lb (73 kg)	2005-02-22	Arlington, Massachusetts	USNTDP (USHL)	—
23	(United States)	Will Traeger	Senior	F	5' 8" (1.73 m)	172 lb (78 kg)	2002-04-10	Mendota Heights, Minnesota	New Jersey Hitmen (NCDC)	—
24	(United States)	Andre Gasseau (C)	Senior	F	6' 4" (1.93 m)	215 lb (98 kg)	2003-07-03	Garden Grove, California	Fargo Force (USHL)	BOS, 213th overall 2021
26	(Slovakia)	Luka Radivojevič	Freshman	D	5' 10" (1.78 m)	172 lb (78 kg)	2007-01-03	Edina, Minnesota	Muskegon Lumberjacks (USHL)	—
27	(United States)	Nolan Joyce	Junior	D	6' 1" (1.85 m)	192 lb (87 kg)	2003-09-25	Dedham, Massachusetts	Chicago Steel (USHL)	—
28	(United States)	Timmy Delay	Junior	F	6' 1" (1.85 m)	170 lb (77 kg)	2003-06-16	Hingham, Massachusetts	Chilliwack Chiefs (BCHL)	—
29	(Canada)	Dean Letourneau	Sophomore	F	6' 7" (2.01 m)	214 lb (97 kg)	2006-02-21	Braeside, Ontario	St. Andrew's College (Midget AAA)	BOS, 25th overall 2024
30	(Slovakia)	Jan Korec	Junior	G	6' 1" (1.85 m)	185 lb (84 kg)	2004-09-28	Bratislava, Slovakia	Des Moines Buccaneers (USHL)	—
31	(United States)	Alex Musielak	Junior	G	6' 4" (1.93 m)	183 lb (83 kg)	2003-07-23	Buffalo, New York	Kemptville 73's (CCHL)	—
36	(United States)	Ryan Conmy	Junior	F	5' 10" (1.78 m)	190 lb (86 kg)	2004-10-23	Alexandria, Virginia	New Hampshire (HEA)	LAK, 182nd overall 2023
37	(United States)	Gavin Cornforth	Freshman	F	5' 10" (1.78 m)	170 lb (77 kg)	2006-12-15	Boston, Massachusetts	Dubuque Fighting Saints (USHL)	—
40	(Canada)	Will Moore	Freshman	F	6' 3" (1.91 m)	181 lb (82 kg)	2007-03-24	Mississauga, Ontario	USNTDP (USHL)	BOS, 51st overall 2025

== Olympians ==
This is a list of Boston College alumni were a part of an Olympic team.

Name	Position	Boston College Tenure	Team	Year	Finish
Joseph Fitzgerald	Forward	1924–1928	(United States) USA	1932	Silver
Len Ceglarski	Forward	1948–1951	(United States) USA	1952	Silver
Jack Mulhern	Forward	1948–1951	(United States) USA	1952	Silver
Wellington Burtnett	Center	1949–1953	(United States) USA	1956	Silver
Red Martin	Defenseman	1958–1961	(United States) USA	1964	5th
Jim Logue	Goaltender	1958–1961	(United States) USA	1968	6th
John Cunniff	Left wing	1963–1966	(United States) USA	1968	6th
Paul Hurley	Defenseman	1964–1967	(United States) USA	1968	6th
Kevin Ahearn	Left wing	1967–1970	(United States) USA	1972	Silver
Tim Sheehy	Right wing	1967–1970	(United States) USA	1972	Silver
Tom Mellor	Defenseman	1968–1971	(United States) USA	1972	Silver
Gary Sampson	Forward	1978–1982	(United States) USA	1984	7th
Kevin Stevens	Center	1983–1987	(United States) USA	1988	7th
Craig Janney	Center	1985–1987	(United States) USA	1988	7th
Brian Leetch	Defenseman	1986–1987	(United States) USA	1988, 1998, 2002	7th, 6th, Silver
Greg Brown	Defenseman	1986–1987, 1988–1990	(United States) USA	1988, 1992	7th, 4th
Scott Gordon	Goaltender	1982–1986	(United States) USA	1992	4th
Tim Sweeney	Left wing	1985–1989	(United States) USA	1992	4th
David Emma	Right wing	1987–1991	(United States) USA	1992	4th
Steve Heinze	Right wing	1988–1991	(United States) USA	1992	4th
Marty McInnis	Center	1988–1991	(United States) USA	1992	4th
Ted Crowley	Defenseman	1988–1991	(United States) USA	1992	4th
Bill Guerin	Defenseman	1989–1991	(United States) USA	1998, 2002, 2006	6th, Silver, 8th
Brian Gionta	Right wing	1997–2001	(United States) USA	2006, 2018	8th, 7th
Brooks Orpik	Defenseman	1998–2001	(United States) USA	2010, 2014	Silver, 4th
Jack McBain	Center	2018–2022	(Canada) CAN	2022	6th
Marc McLaughlin	Center	2018–2022	(United States) USA	2022	5th
Drew Helleson	Defenseman	2019–2022	(United States) USA	2022	5th
Noah Hanifin	Defenseman	2014–2015	(United States) USA	2026	Gold
Matt Boldy	Left Wing	2019–2021	(United States) USA	2026	Gold

== Eagles in the NHL ==
as of July 1, 2025.

= NHL All–Star team	= NHL All–Star	= NHL All–Star and NHL All–Star team	= Hall of Famers

Player	Position	Team(s)	Years	Games	Stanley Cups
Andrew Alberts	Defenseman	BOS, PHI, CAR, VAN	2005–2014	459	0
Bobby Allen	Defenseman	EDM, BOS	2002–2008	51	0
Bill Arnold	Center	CGY	2013–2014	1	0
Cam Atkinson	Right wing	CBJ, PHI, TBL	2011–Present	809	0
Blake Bellefeuille	Center	CBJ	2001–2003	5	0
Harvey Bennett Jr.	Center	PIT, WAS, PHI, MNS, STL	1974–1979	268	0
Matt Boldy	Left wing	MIN	2021–Present	285	0
Brian Boyle	Center	LAK, NYR, TBL, TOR, NJD, NSH, FLA, PIT	2007–2022	871	0
Doug Brown	Right wing	NJD, PIT, DET	1986–2001	854	2
Greg Brown	Defenseman	BUF, PIT, WIN	1990–1995	94	0
Patrick Brown	Center	CAR, VGK, PHI, OTT, BOS	2014–Present	164	0
Dominic Campedelli	Defenseman	MTL	1985–1986	2	0
Paul Carey	Center	COL, WAS, NYR, OTT, BOS	2013–2020	100	0
Scott Clemmensen	Goaltender	NJD, TOR, FLA	2001–2015	191	0
Tommy Cross	Defenseman	BOS	2015–2017	3	0
Ted Crowley	Center	HFD, COL, NYI	1993–1999	34	0
Thatcher Demko	Goaltender	VAN	2017–Present	242	0
Brian Dumoulin	Defenseman	PIT, SEA, ANA, NJD	2013–Present	706	2
Patrick Eaves	Right wing	OTT, CAR, DET, NSH, DAL, ANA	2005–2019	633	0
David Emma	Right wing	NJD, BOS, FLA	1992–2001	34	0
Jeff Farkas	Center	TOR, ATL	1999–2003	11	0
Benn Ferriero	Right wing	SJS, NYR, VAN	2009–2014	98	0
Casey Fitzgerald	Defenseman	BUF, FLA	2021–2023	63	0
Johnny Gaudreau	Left wing	CGY, CBJ	2013–2024	763	0
Nathan Gerbe	Center	BUF, CAR, CBJ	2008–2018	435	0
Cutter Gauthier	Left wing	ANA	2023–Present	83	0
Patrick Giles	Right wing	FLA, SJS	2024–Present	17	0
Brian Gionta	Right wing	NJD, MTL, BUF, BOS	2001–2018	1,026	1
Stephen Gionta	Right wing	NJD, NYI	2010–2019	301	0
Jeff Giuliano	Right wing	LAK	2005–2008	101	0
Matt Glennon	Left wing	BOS	1991–1992	3	0
Scott Gordon	Goaltender	QUE	1989–1991	23	0
Bill Guerin	Right wing	NJD, EDM, BOS, DAL, STL, SJS, NYI, PIT	1991–2010	1,263	2
Noah Hanifin	Defenseman	CAR, CGY, VGK	2015–Present	758	0
Mike Hardman	Left wing	CHI, NJD	2020–Present	39	0
Scott Harlow	Left wing	STL	1987–1988	1	0
Peter Harrold	Defenseman	LAK, NJD	2006–2015	274	0
Jimmy Hayes	Right wing	CHI, FLA, BOS, NJD	2011–2018	334	0
Kevin Hayes	Forward	NYR, WPG, PHI, STL, PIT	2013–Present	777	0
Steve Heinze	Right wing	BOS, CBJ, BUF, LAK	1991–2003	694	0
Drew Helleson	Defenseman	ANA	2022–Present	59	0
Ken Hodge Jr.	Center	MNS, BOS, TBL	1988–1993	142	0
Paul Hurley	Defenseman	BOS	1968–1969	1	0
Craig Janney	Center	BOS, STL, SJS, WIN, PHO, TBL, NYI	1988–1999	760	0
Spencer Knight	Goaltender	FLA, CHI	2021–Present	95	0
Chuck Kobasew	Right wing	CGY, BOS, MIN, COL, PIT	2002–2014	601	0
Krys Kolanos	Center	PHO, EDM, MIN, CGY	2001–2012	149	0

Player	Position	Team(s)	Years	Games	Stanley Cups
Chris Kreider	Left wing	NYR	2011–Present	883	0
Brian Leetch	Defenseman	NYR, TOR, BOS	1987–2006	1,205	1
Ryan Leonard	Right wing	WSH	2024–Present	9	0
David Littman	Goaltender	BUF, TBL	1990–1993	3	0
Ben Lovejoy	Defenseman	PIT, ANA, NJD	2008–2019	544	1
Mike Matheson	Defenseman	FLA, PIT, MTL	2015–Present	627	0
Jack McBain	Center	ARI, UTA	2021–Present	241	0
Ian McCoshen	Defenseman	FLA	2016–2018	60	0
Marty McInnis	Left wing	NYI, CGY, ANA, BOS	1991–2003	796	0
Marc McLaughlin	Center	BOS, NJD	2021–Present	28	0
Tom Mellor	Defenseman	DET	1973–1975	26	0
Ian Moran	Right wing	PIT, BOS, ANA	1994–2007	489	0
Mike Mottau	Defenseman	NYR, CGY, NJD, NYI, BOS, FLA	2000–2014	321	0
Joe Mullen	Right wing	STL, CGY, PIT, BOS	1979–1997	1,062	3
Nikita Nesterenko	Center	ANA	2022–Present	32	0
Alex Newhook	Center	COL, MTL	2021–Present	296	1
Billy O'Dwyer	Center	LAK, BOS	1983–1990	120	0
Brooks Orpik	Defenseman	PIT, WAS	2002–2019	1,035	2
Gabriel Perreault	Right Wing	NYR	2024–Present	5	0
Nick Petrecki	Goaltender	SJS	2012–2013	1	0
Adam Pineault	Defenseman	CBJ	2007–2008	3	0
Marty Reasoner	Center	STL, EDM, BOS, ATL, FLA, NYI	1998–2013	798	0
Gary Sampson	Left wing	WAS	1983–1987	105	0
Philip Samuelsson	Defenseman	PIT, ARI	2013–2016	13	0
Zach Sanford	Left wing	WAS, STL, OTT, WIN, NSH, ARI, CHI	2016–2024	334	1
Steven Santini	Defenseman	NJD, NSH, STL, TBL	2015–Present	124	0
Cory Schneider	Goaltender	VAN, NJD, NYI	2008–2022	410	0
Rob Scuderi	Defenseman	PIT, LAK, CHI	2003–2016	783	2
Ryan Shannon	Center	ANA, VAN, OTT, TBL	2006–2012	305	1
Tim Sheehy	Center	DET, HFD	1977–1980	27	0
Paul Skidmore	Goaltender	STL	1981–1982	2	0
Ben Smith	Right wing	CHI , SJS, TOR, COL	2010–2017	237	1
Will Smith	Center	SJS	2024–Present	74	0
Carl Sneep	Defenseman	PIT	2011–2012	1	0
Tom Songin	Right wing	BOS	1978–1981	43	0
Jack St. Ivany	Defenseman	PIT	2023–Present	33	0
Kevin Stevens	Left wing	PIT, BOS, LAK, NYR, PHI	1987–2002	874	2
Bob Sweeney	Center	BOS, BUF, NYI, CGY	1986–1996	639	0
Tim Sweeney	Left wing	CGY, BOS, ANA, NYR	1990–1998	291	0
Alex Tuch	Right wing	MIN, VGK, BUF	2016–Present	536	0
Oliver Wahlstrom	Right wing	NYI, BOS	2019–Present	236	0
Patrick Wey	Defenseman	WAS	2013–2014	9	0
Colin White	Center	OTT, FLA, PIT, MTL, SJS	2016–Present	323	0
Joe Whitney	Left wing	NJD	2013–2015	5	0
Joseph Woll	Goaltender	TOR	2021–Present	78	0
Miles Wood	Left wing	NJD, COL	2015–Present	513	0

=== WHA ===
Player	Position	Team(s)	Years	Avco Cups
Kevin Ahearn	Left wing	NEW	1972–1973	1
John Cunniff	Left wing	NEW, QUE	1972–1976	1
Rich Hart	Defenseman	BIR	1976–1977	0
Paul Hurley	Defenseman	NEW, EDM, CAC	1972–1977	1
Tim Sheehy	Center	NEW, EDM, BIR	1972–1978	1

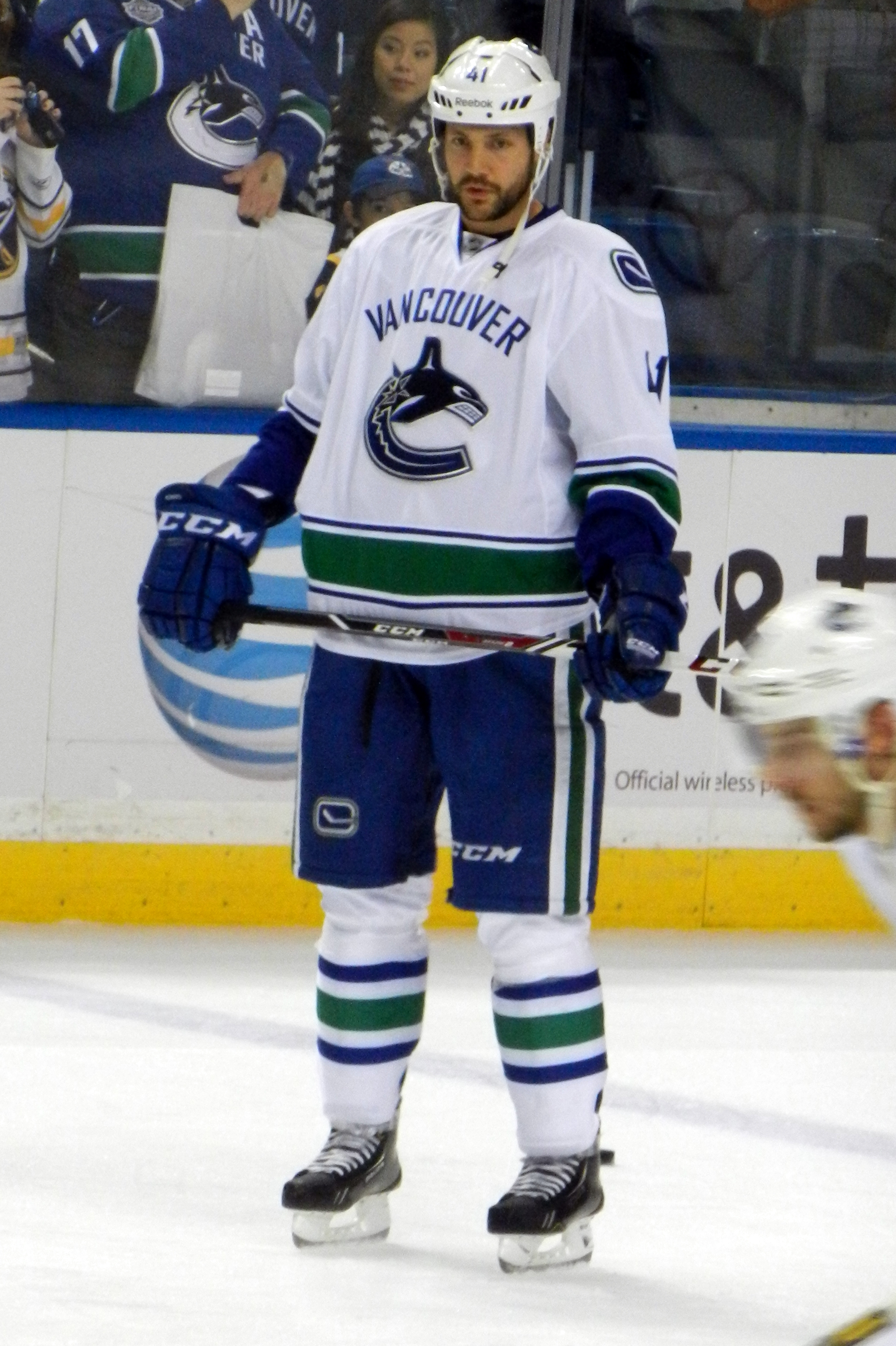
Andrew Alberts

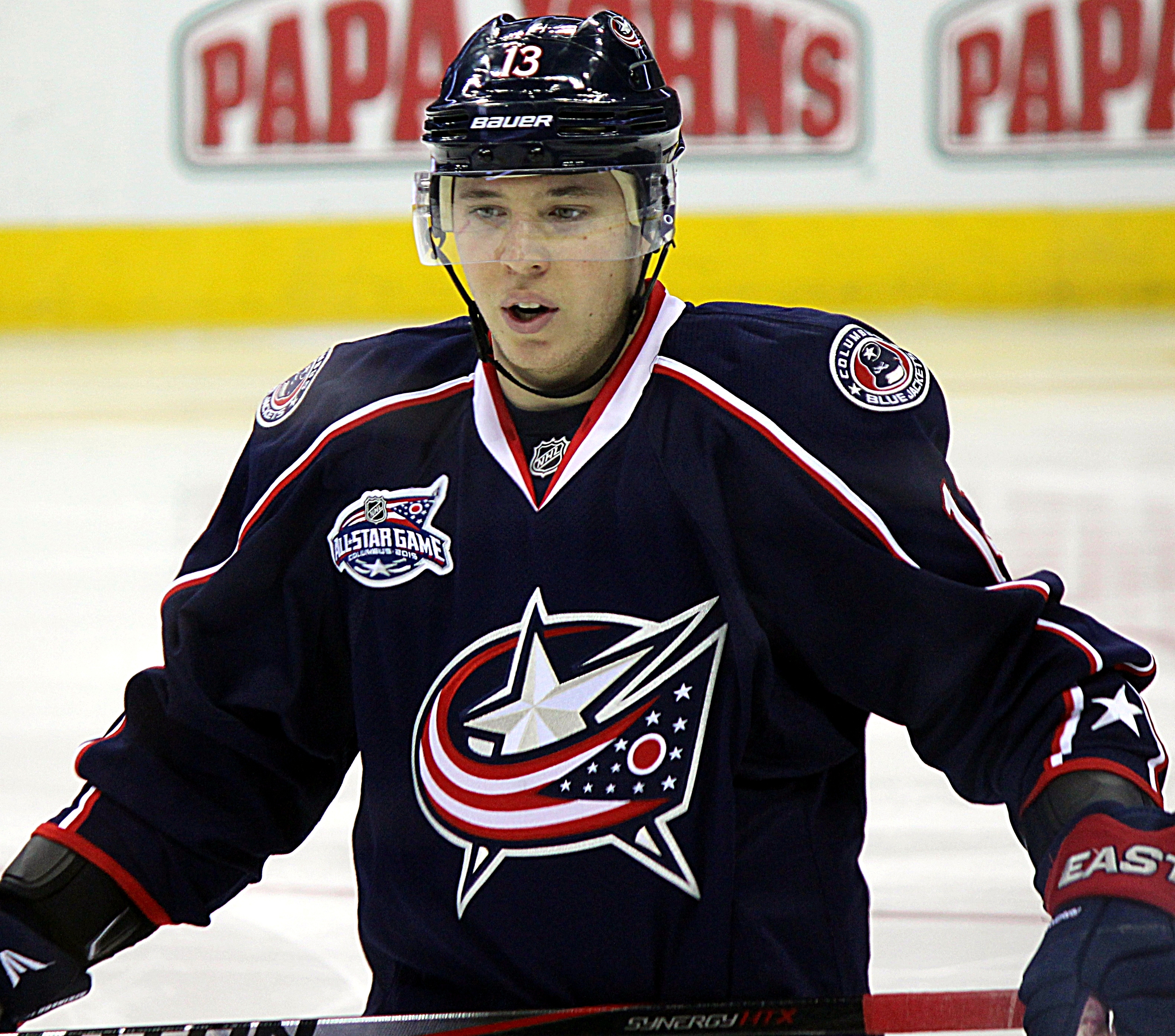
Cam Atkinson

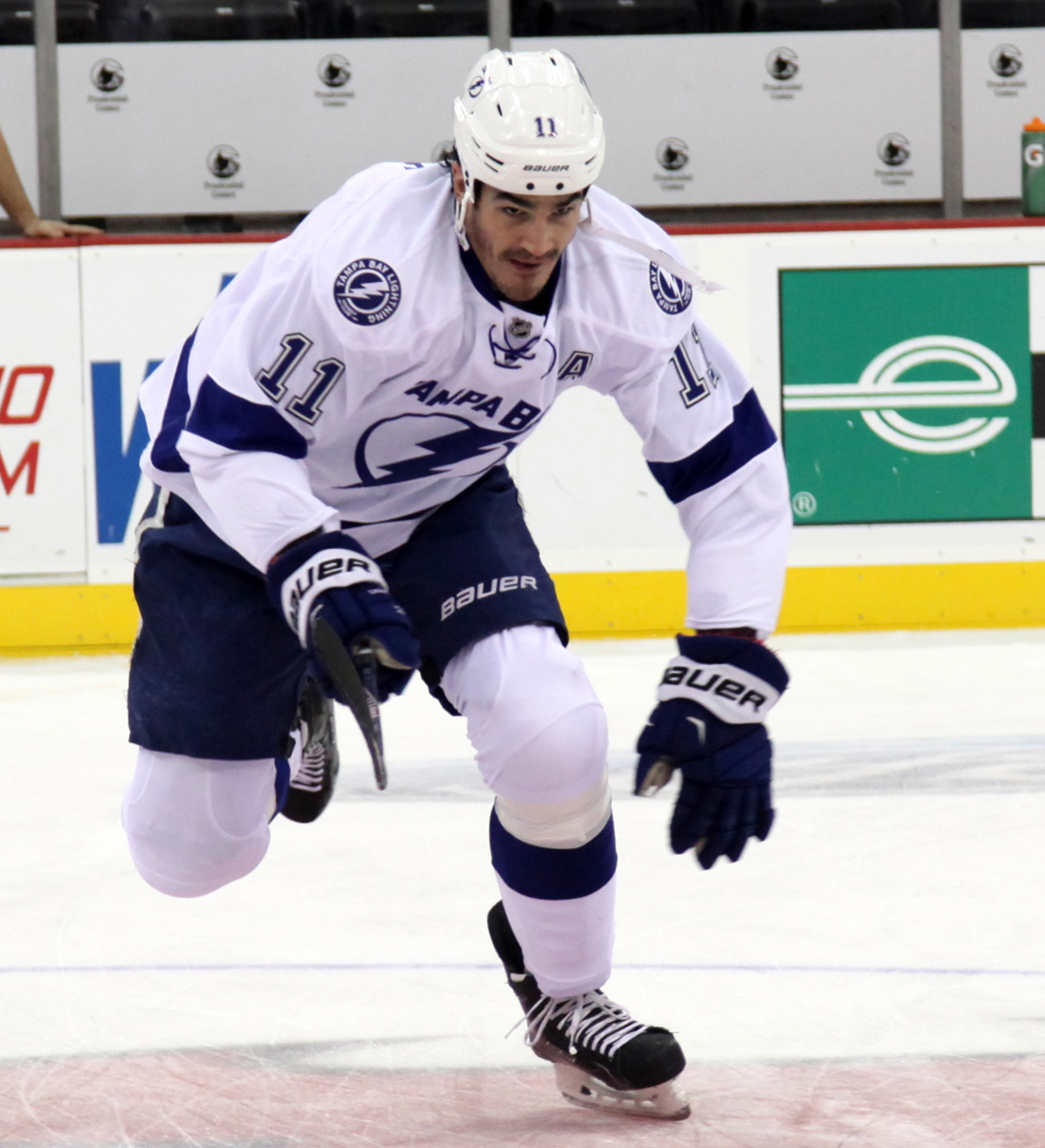
Brian Boyle

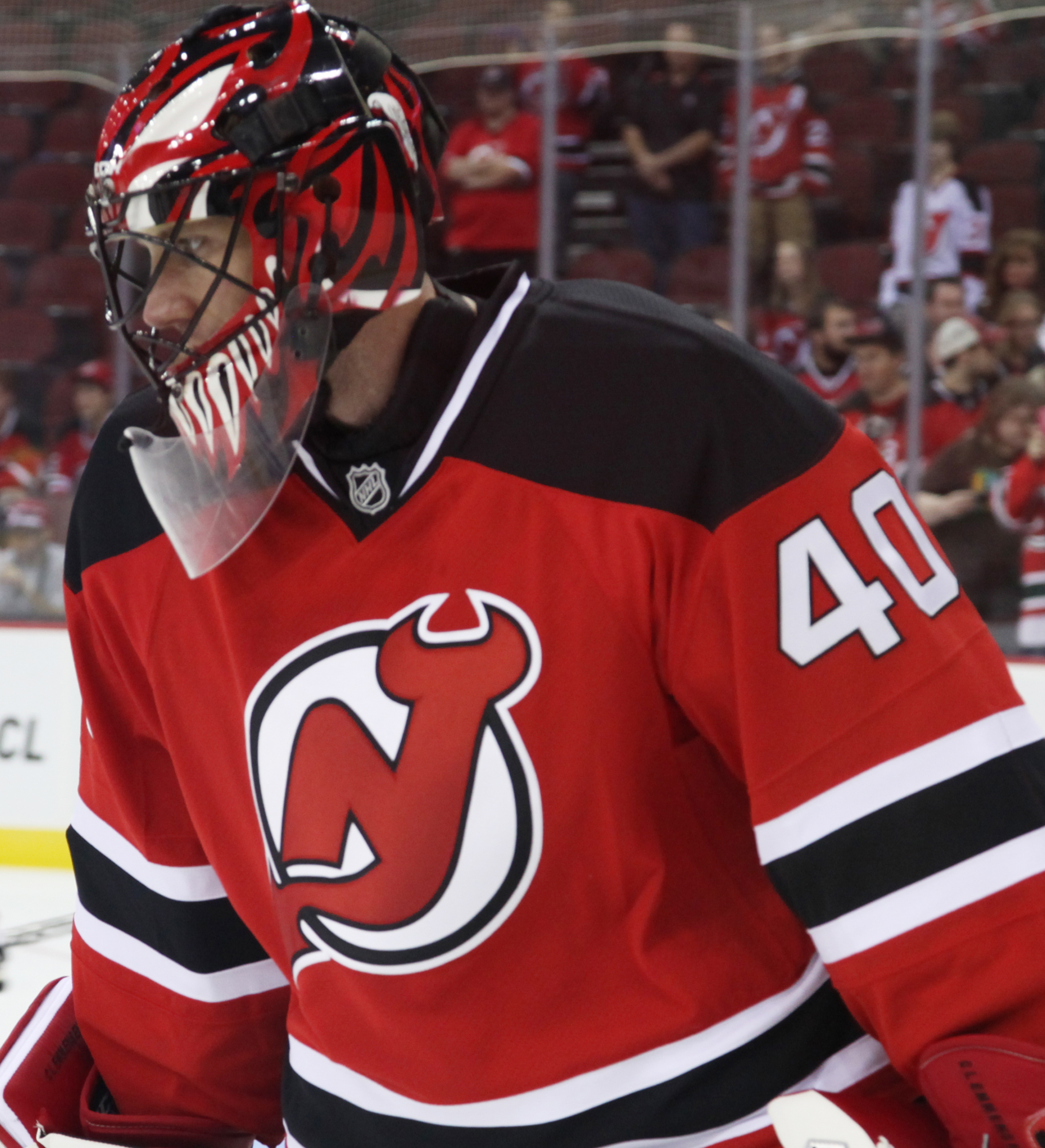
Scott Clemmensen

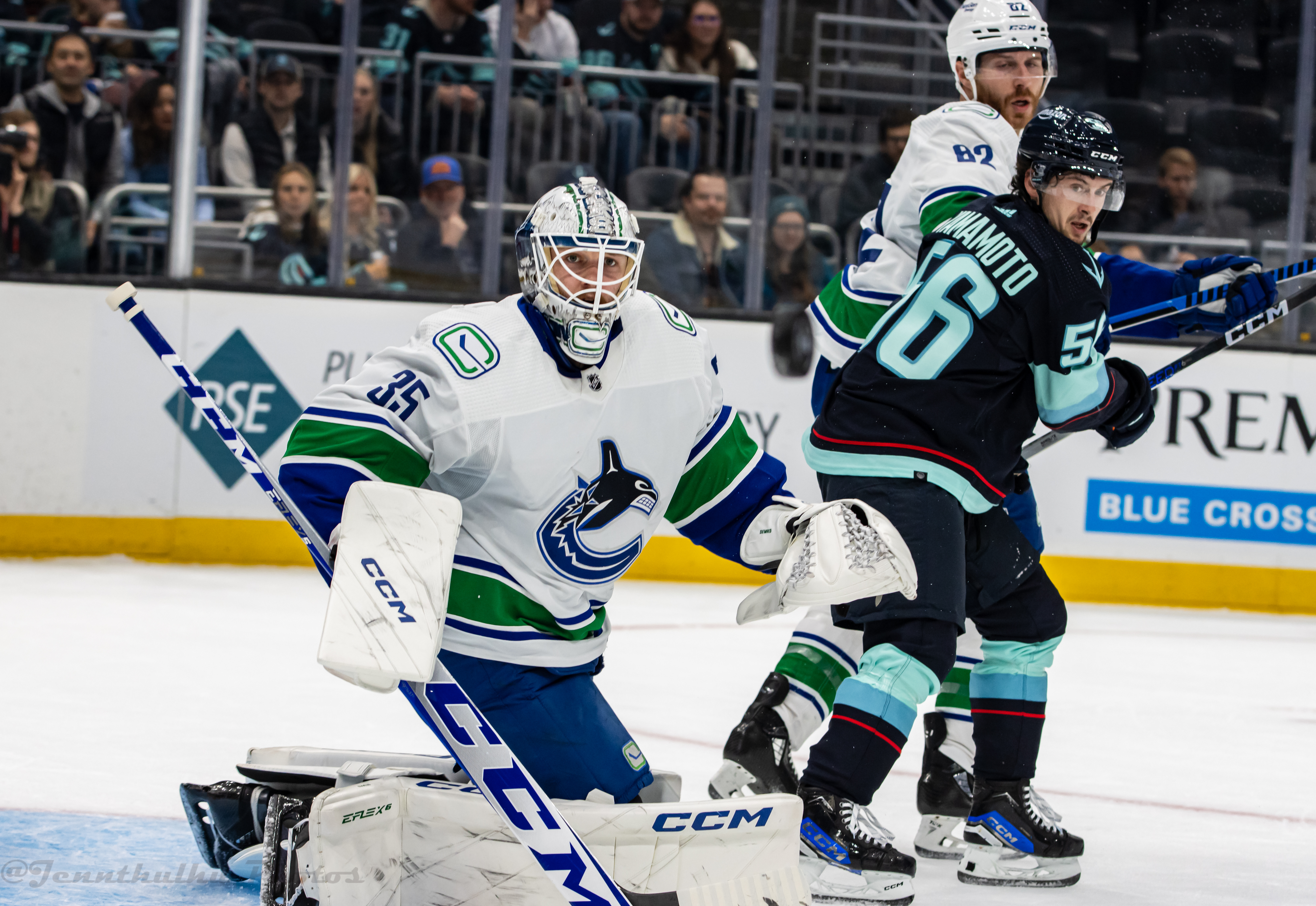
Thatcher Demko

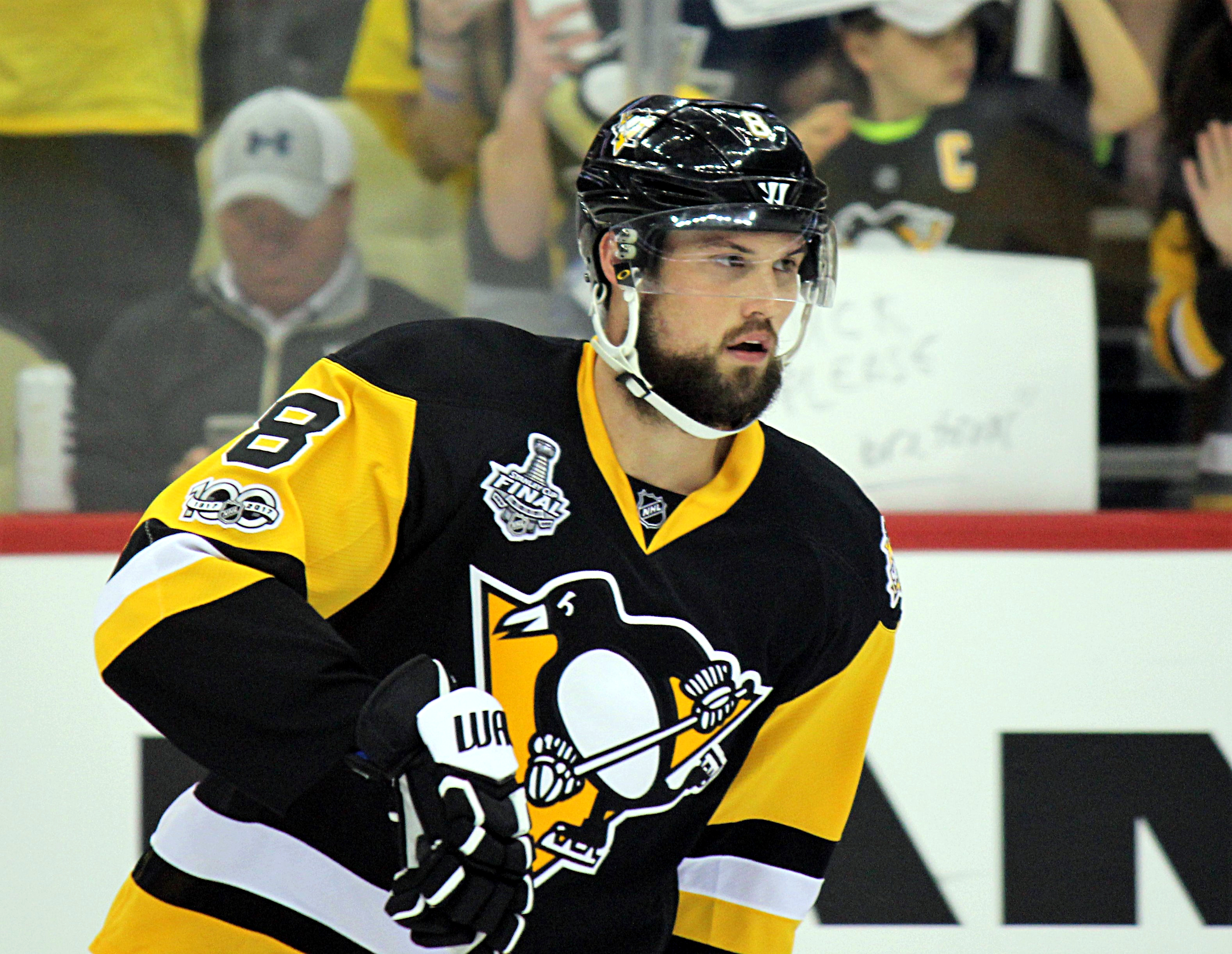
Brian Dumoulin

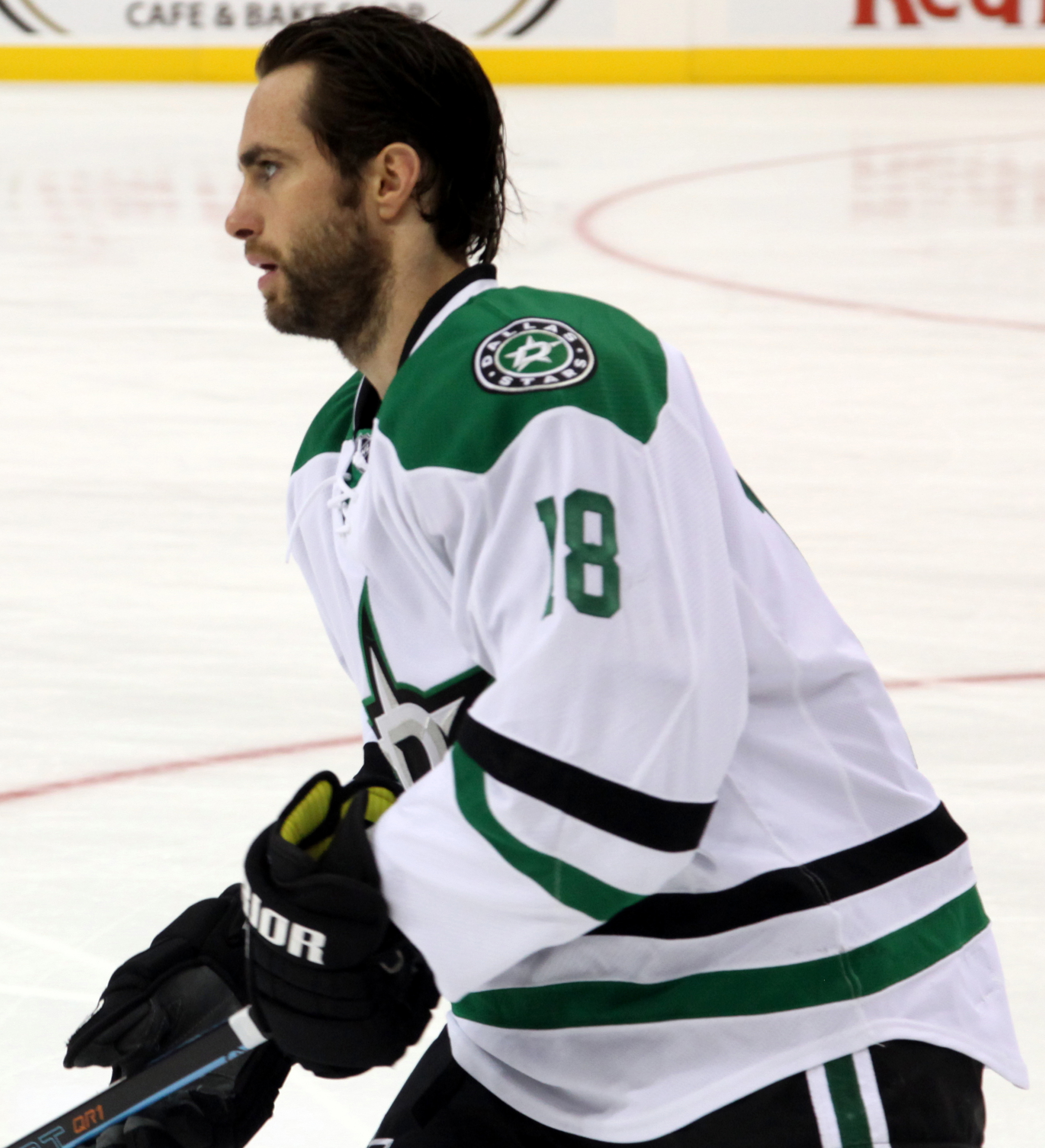
Patrick Eaves

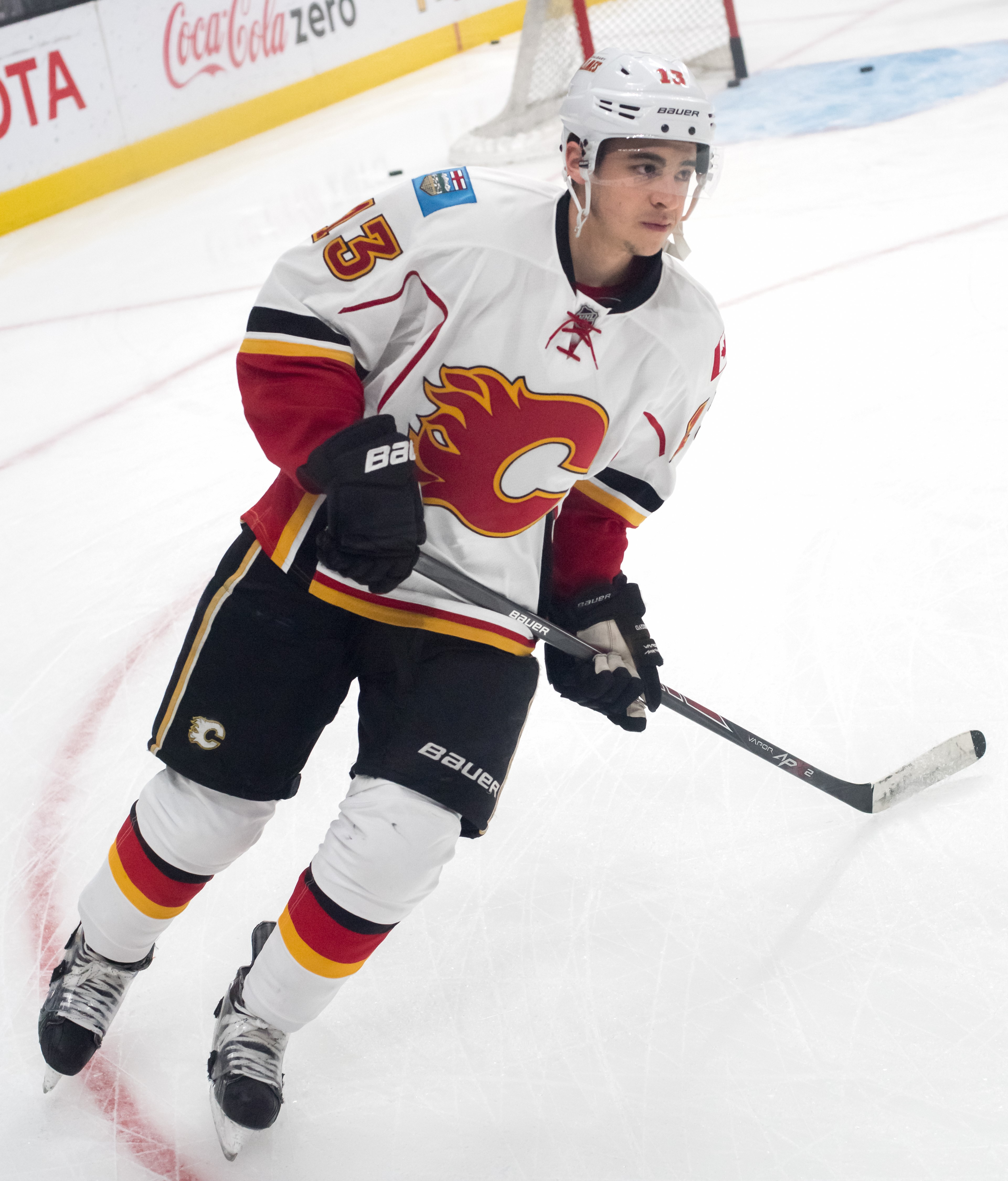
Johnny Gaudreau

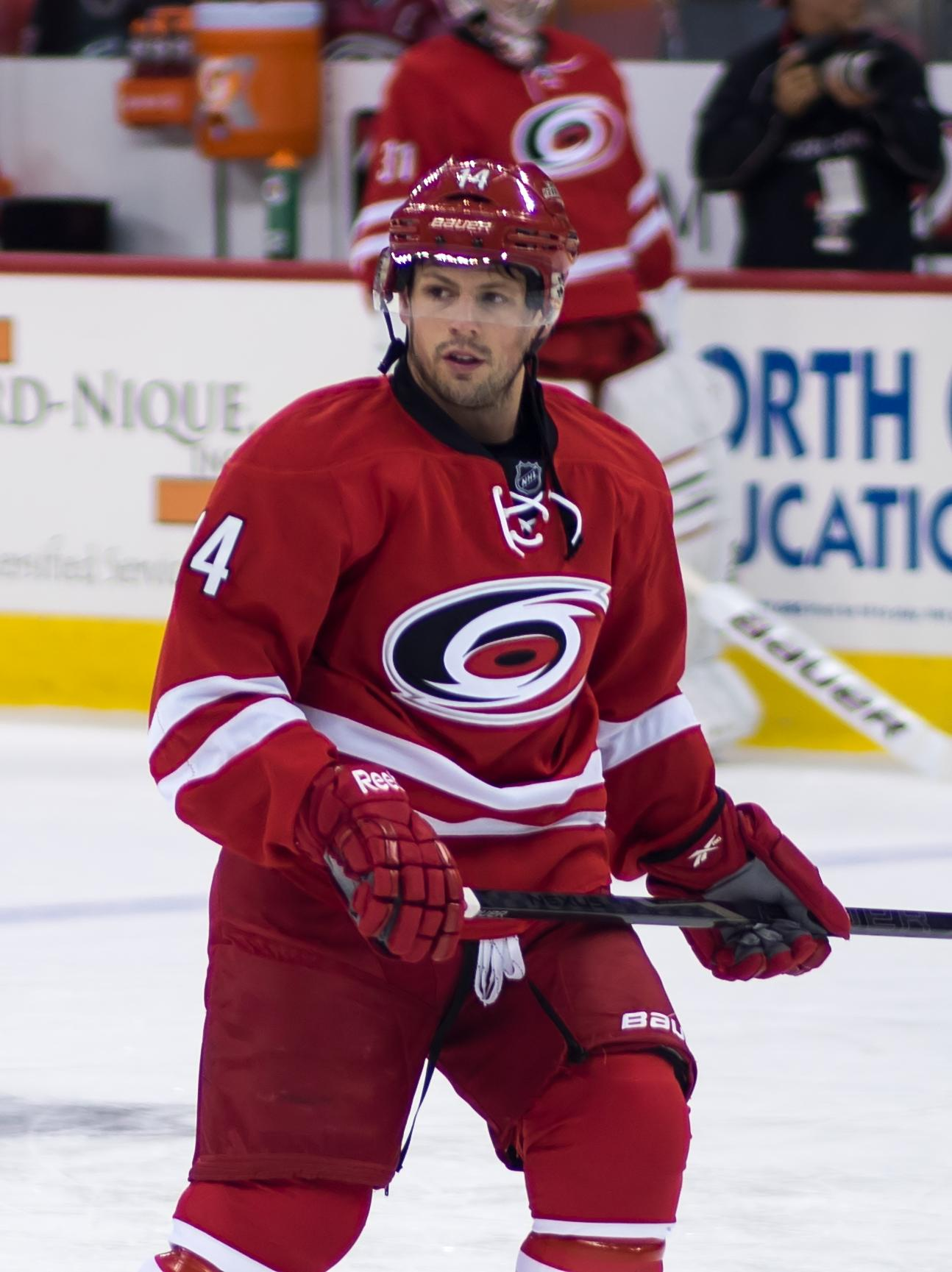
Nathan Gerbe

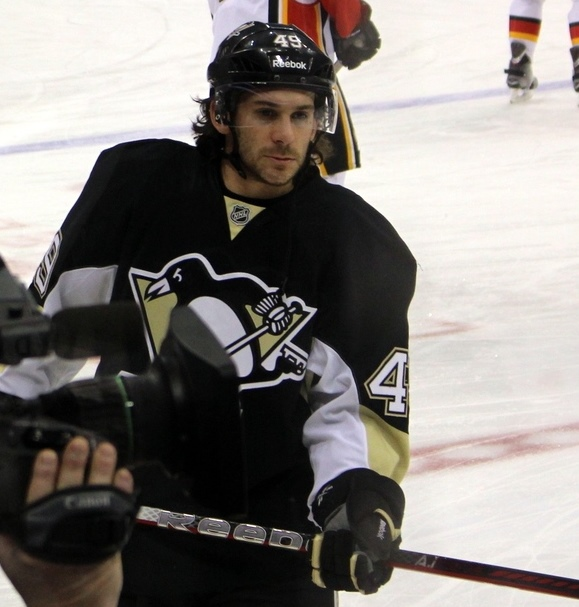
Brian Gibbons

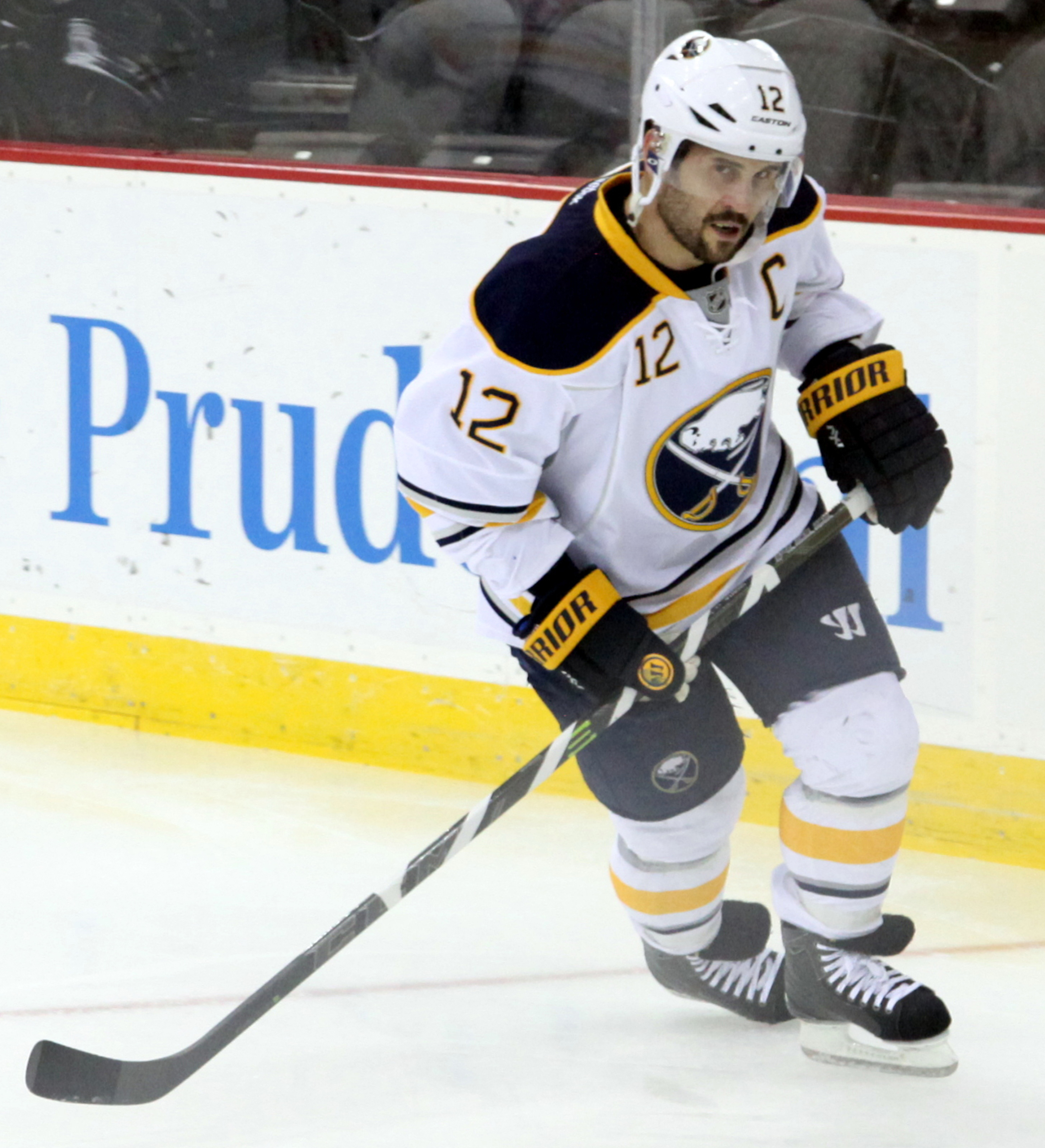
Brian Gionta

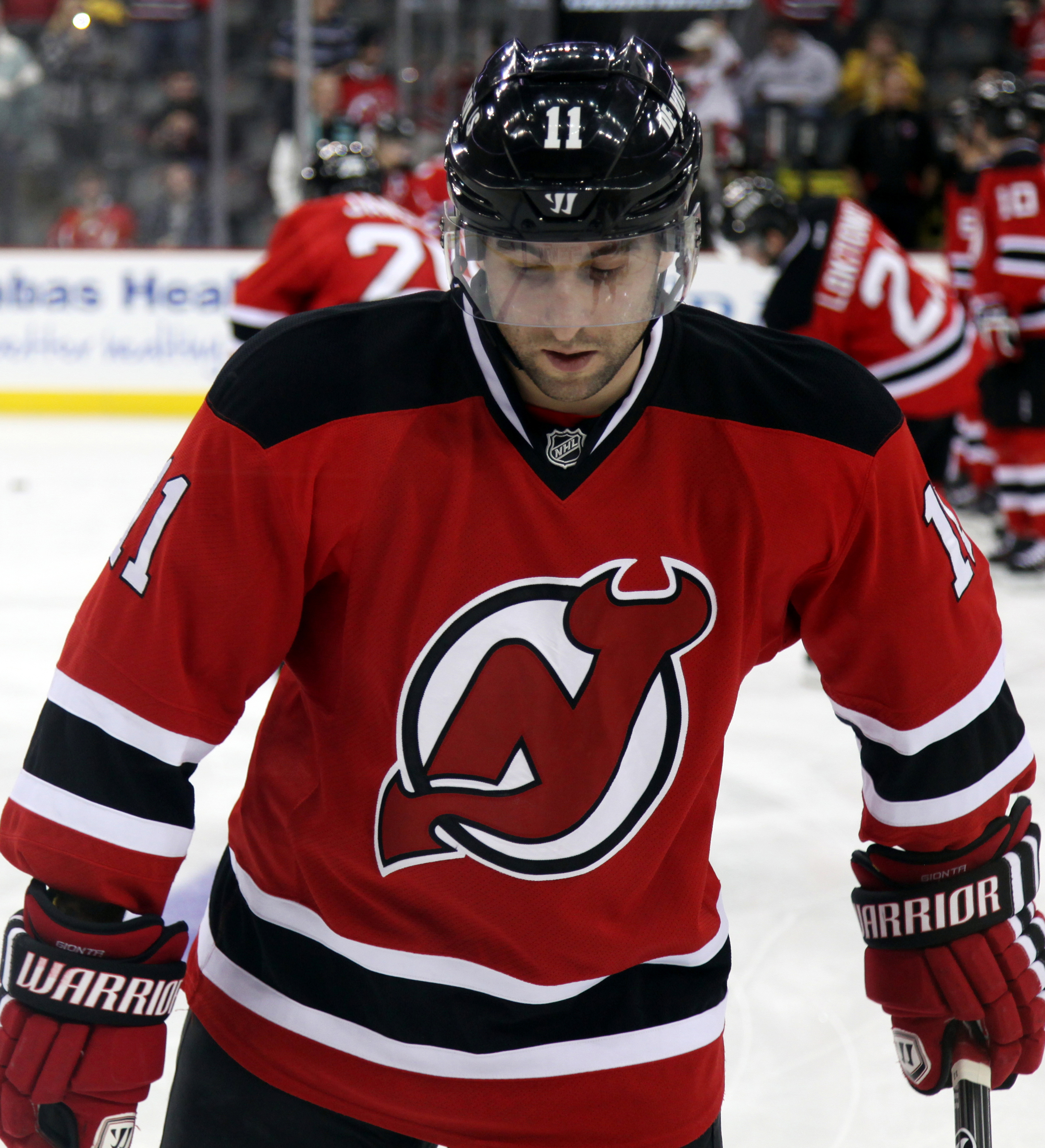
Stephen Gionta

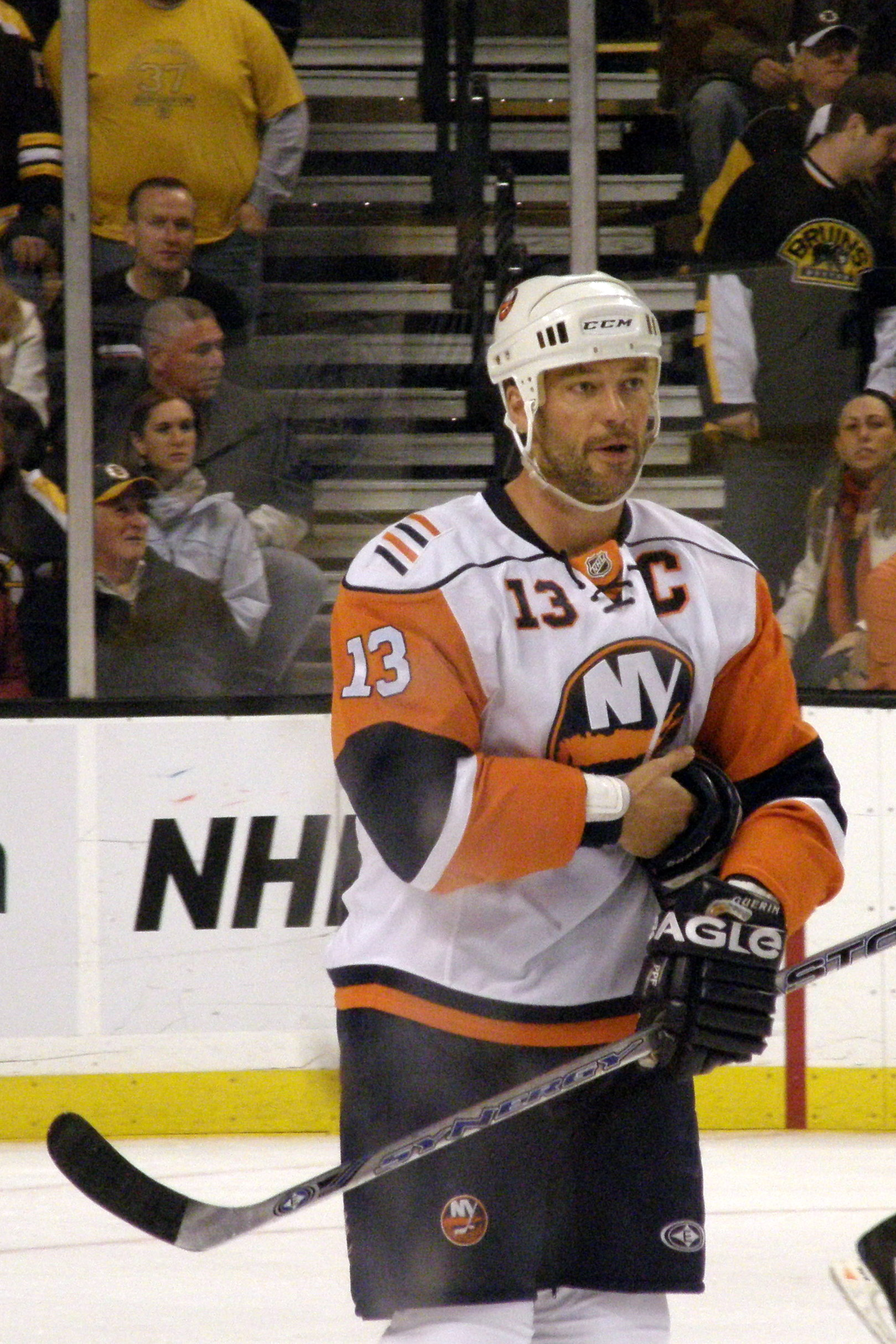
Bill Guerin

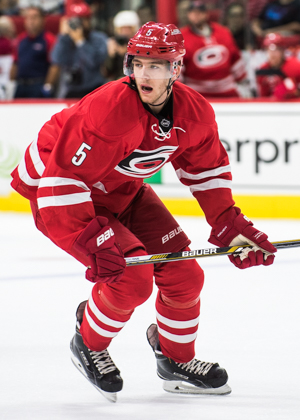
Noah Hanifin

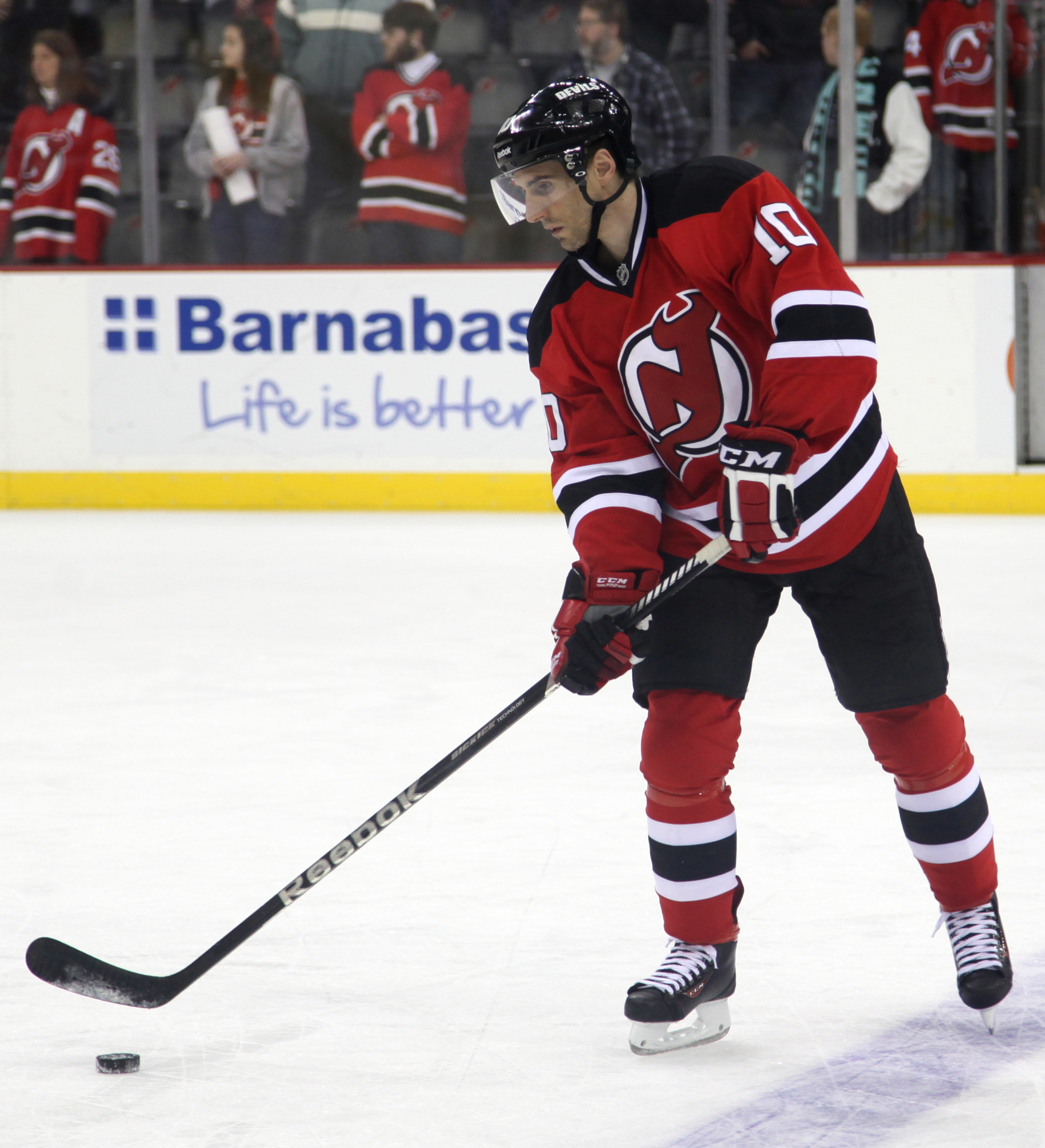
Peter Harrold

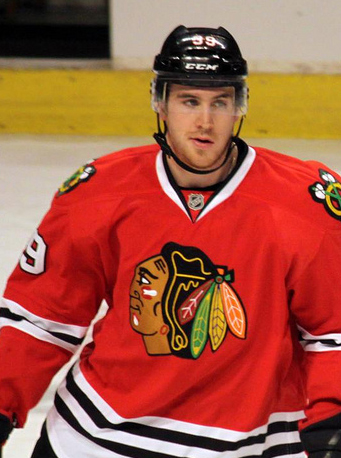
Jimmy Hayes

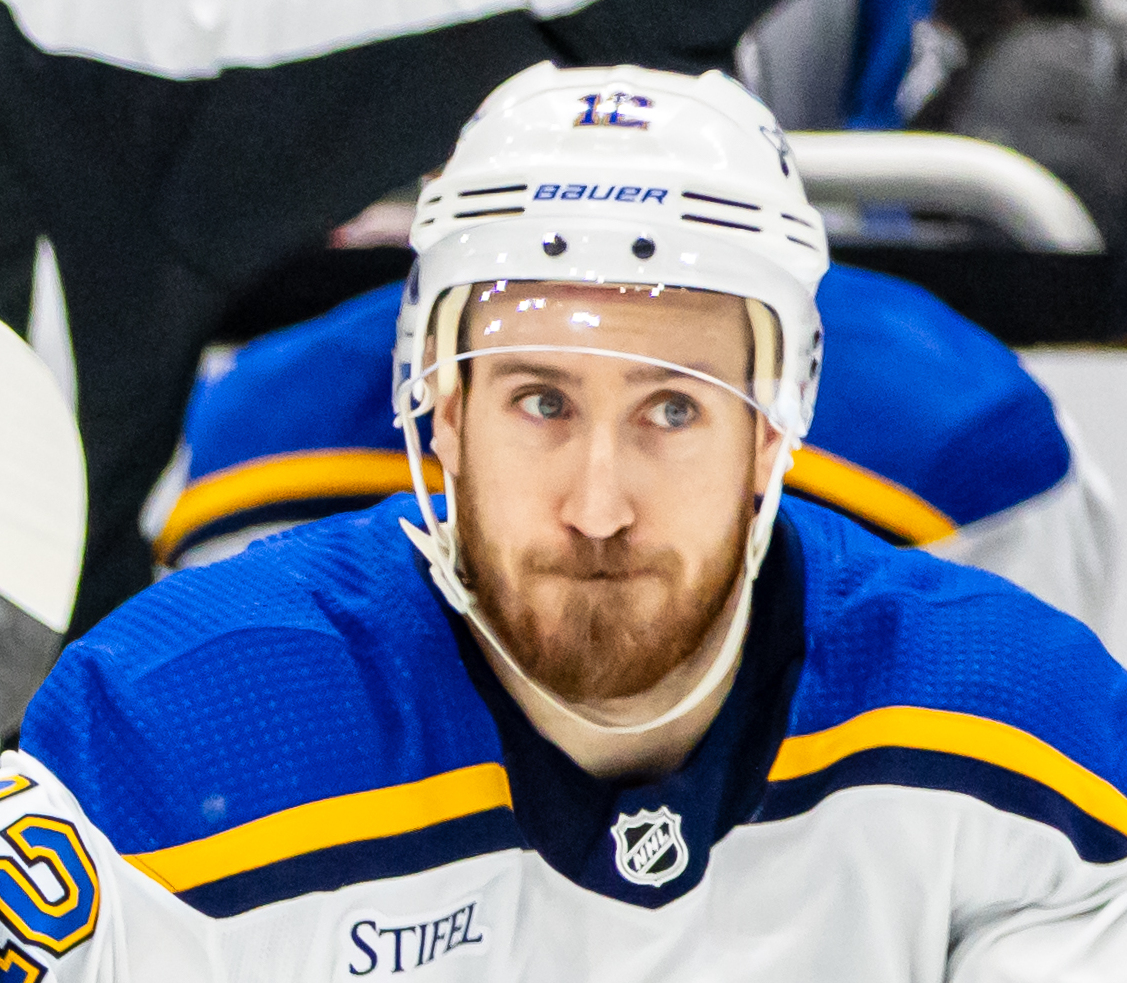
Kevin Hayes

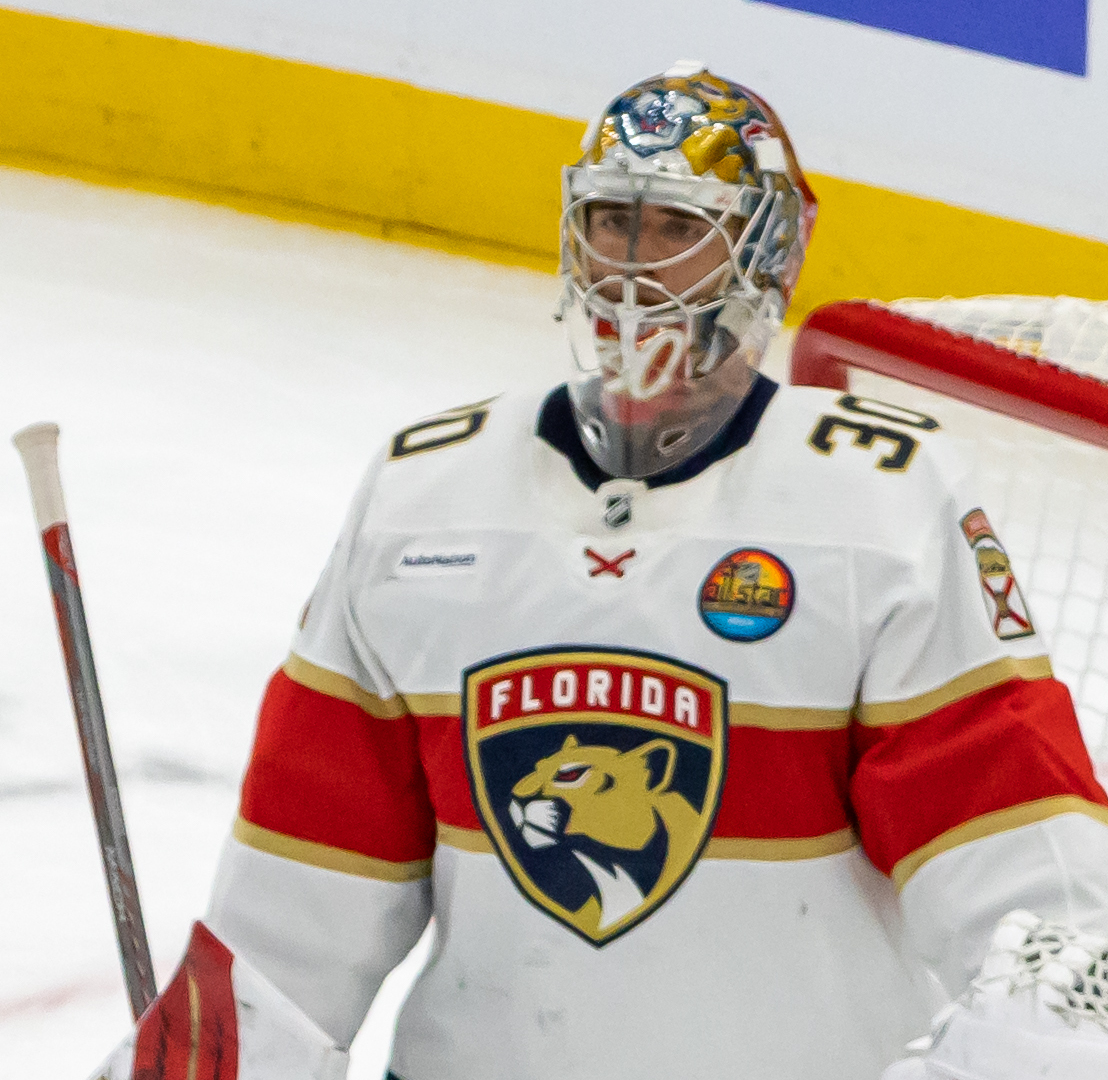
Spencer Knight

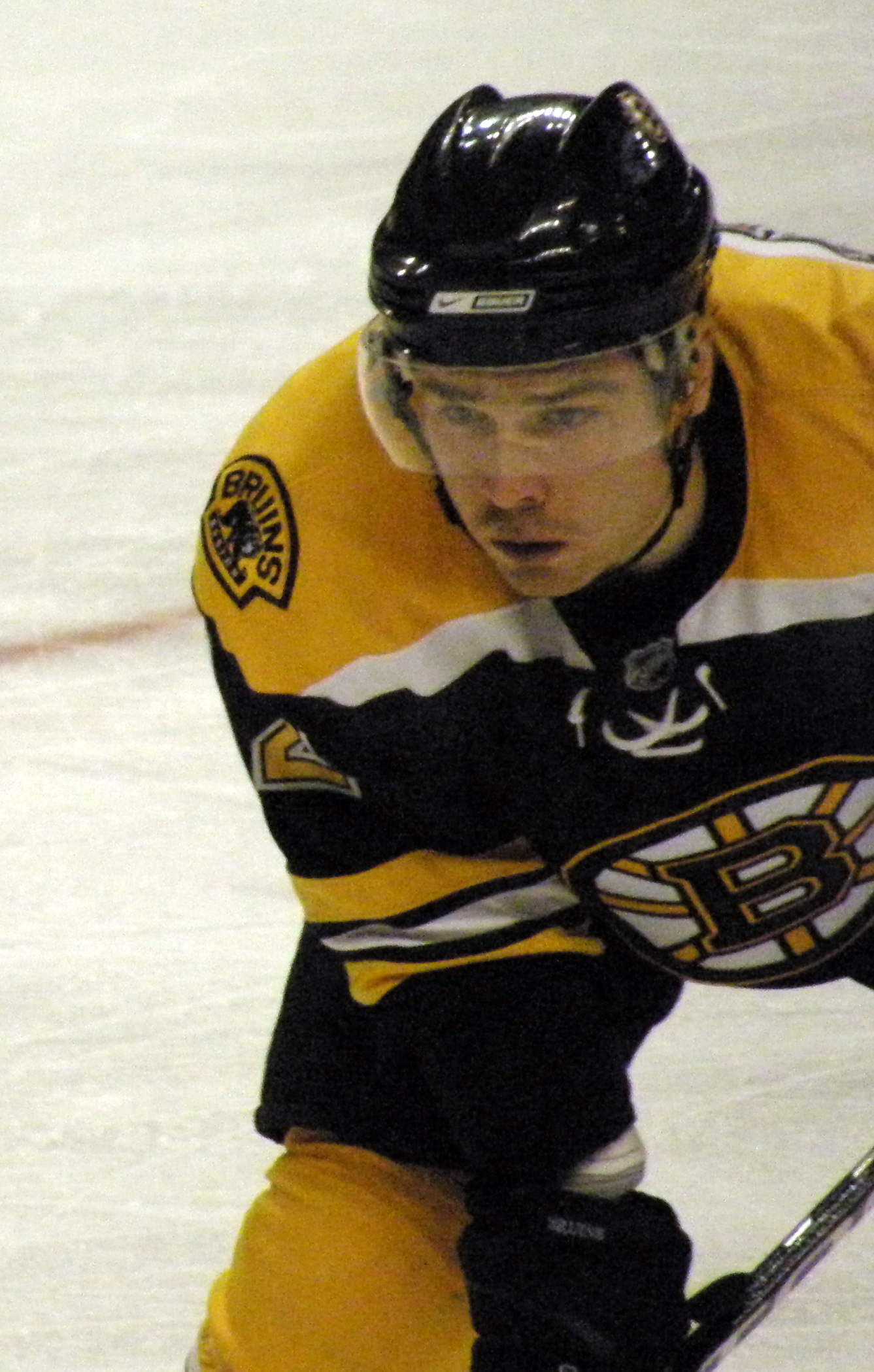
Chuck Kobasew

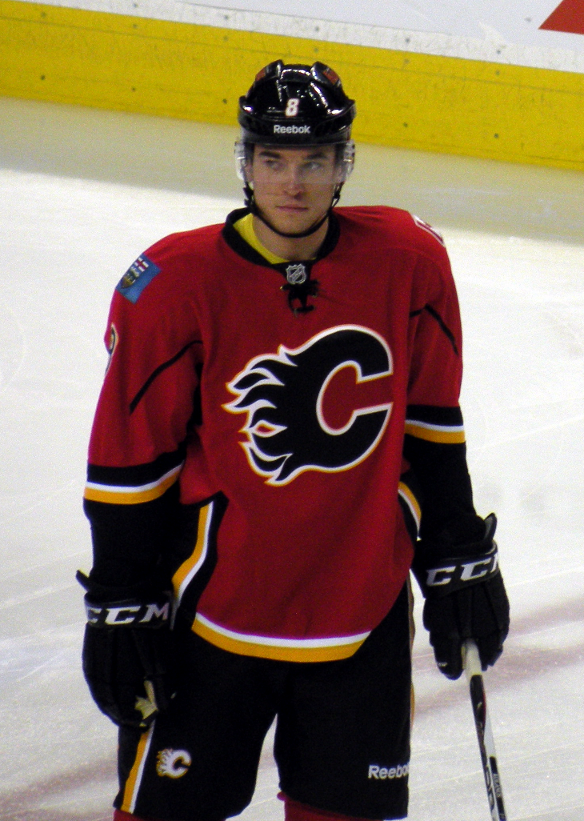
Krys Kolanos

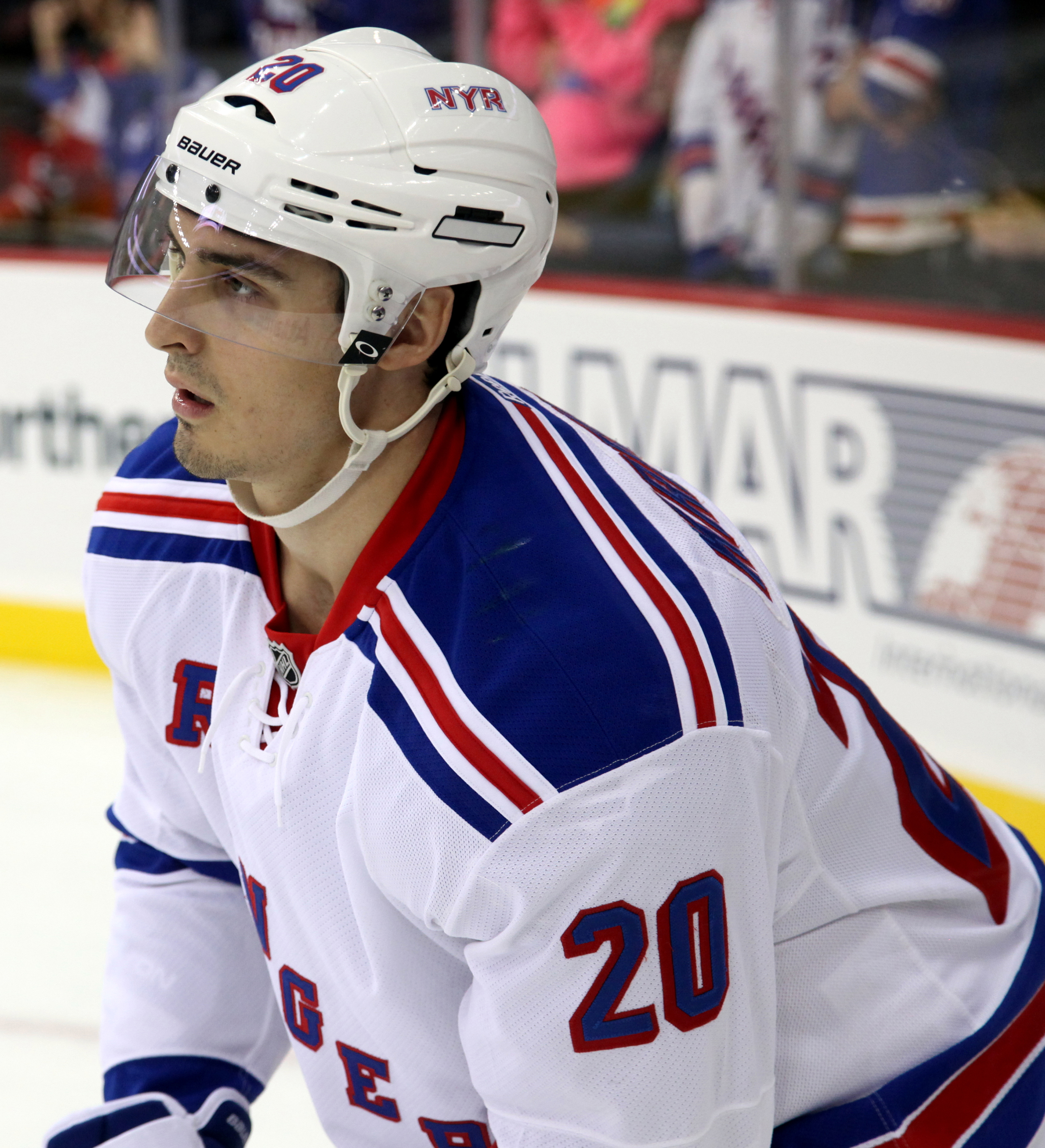
Chris Kreider

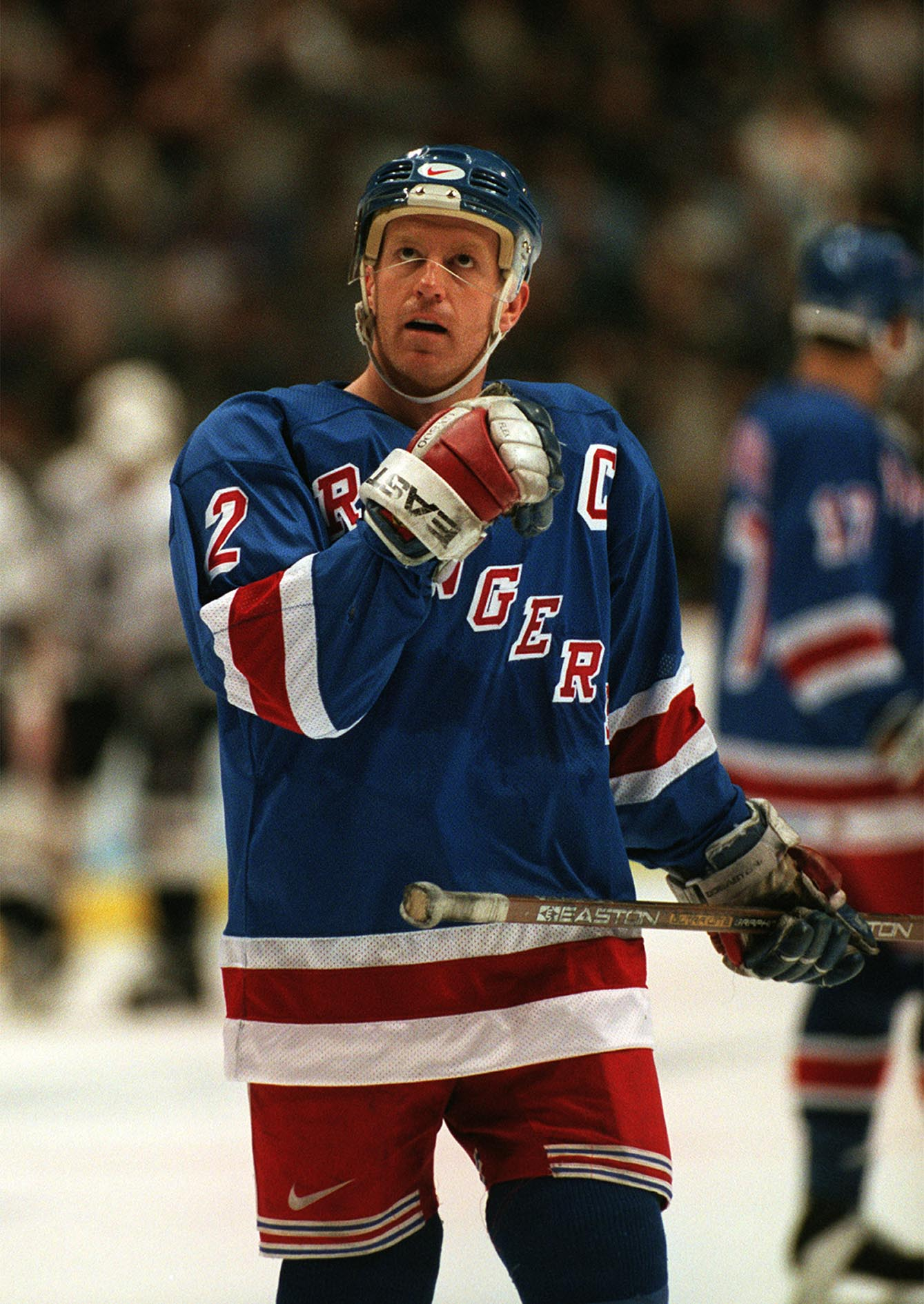
Brian Leetch

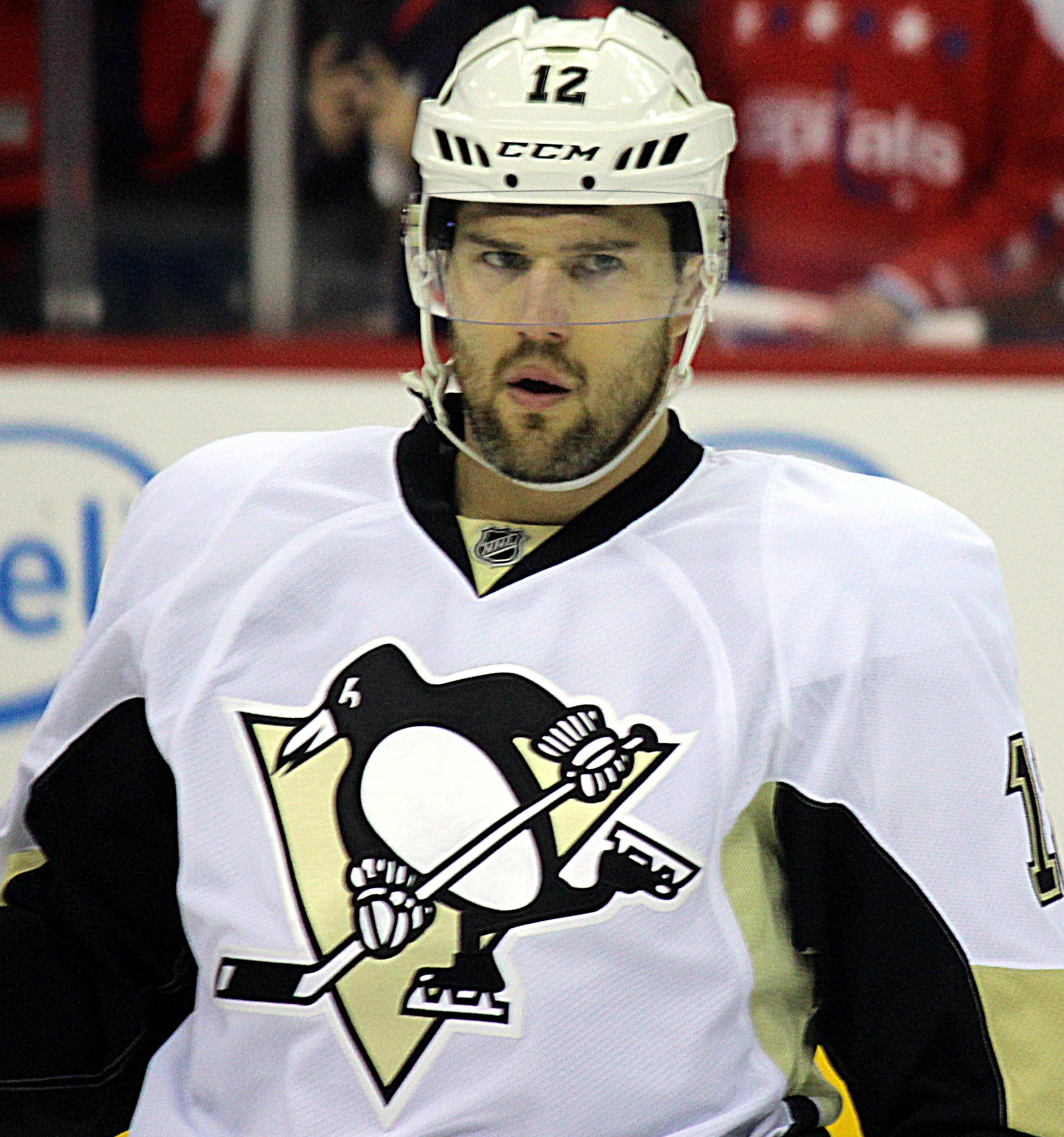
Ben Lovejoy

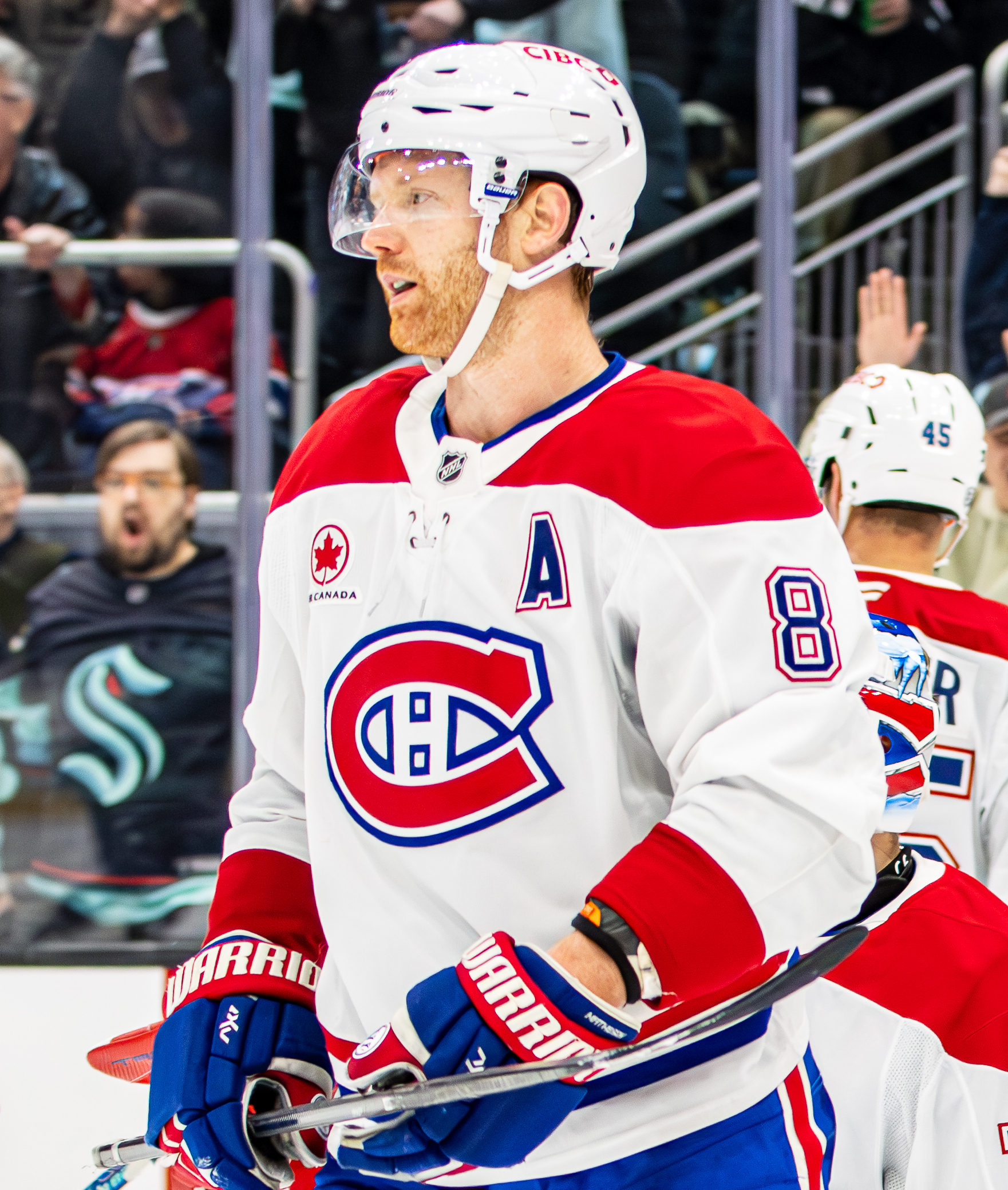
Mike Matheson

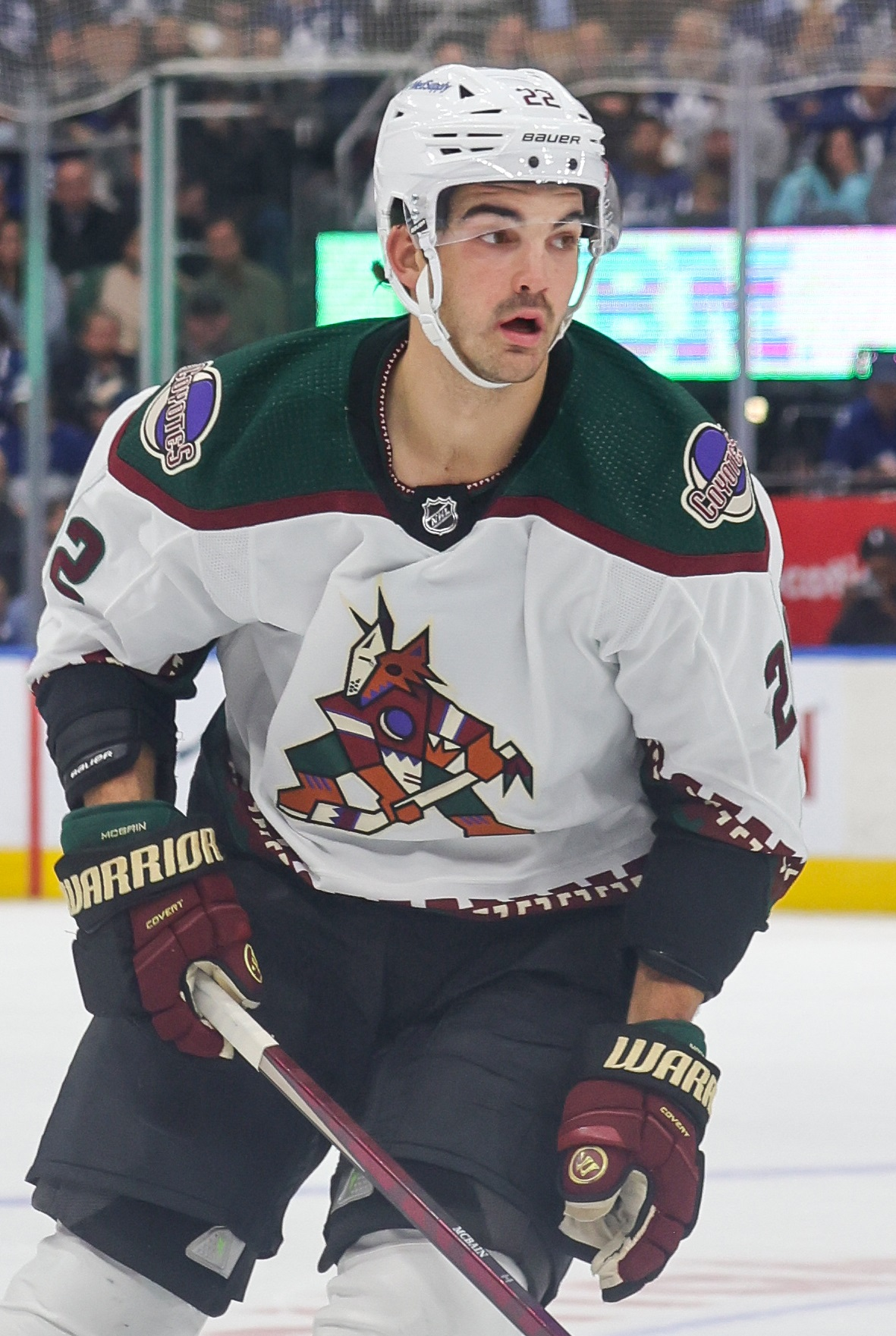
Jack McBain

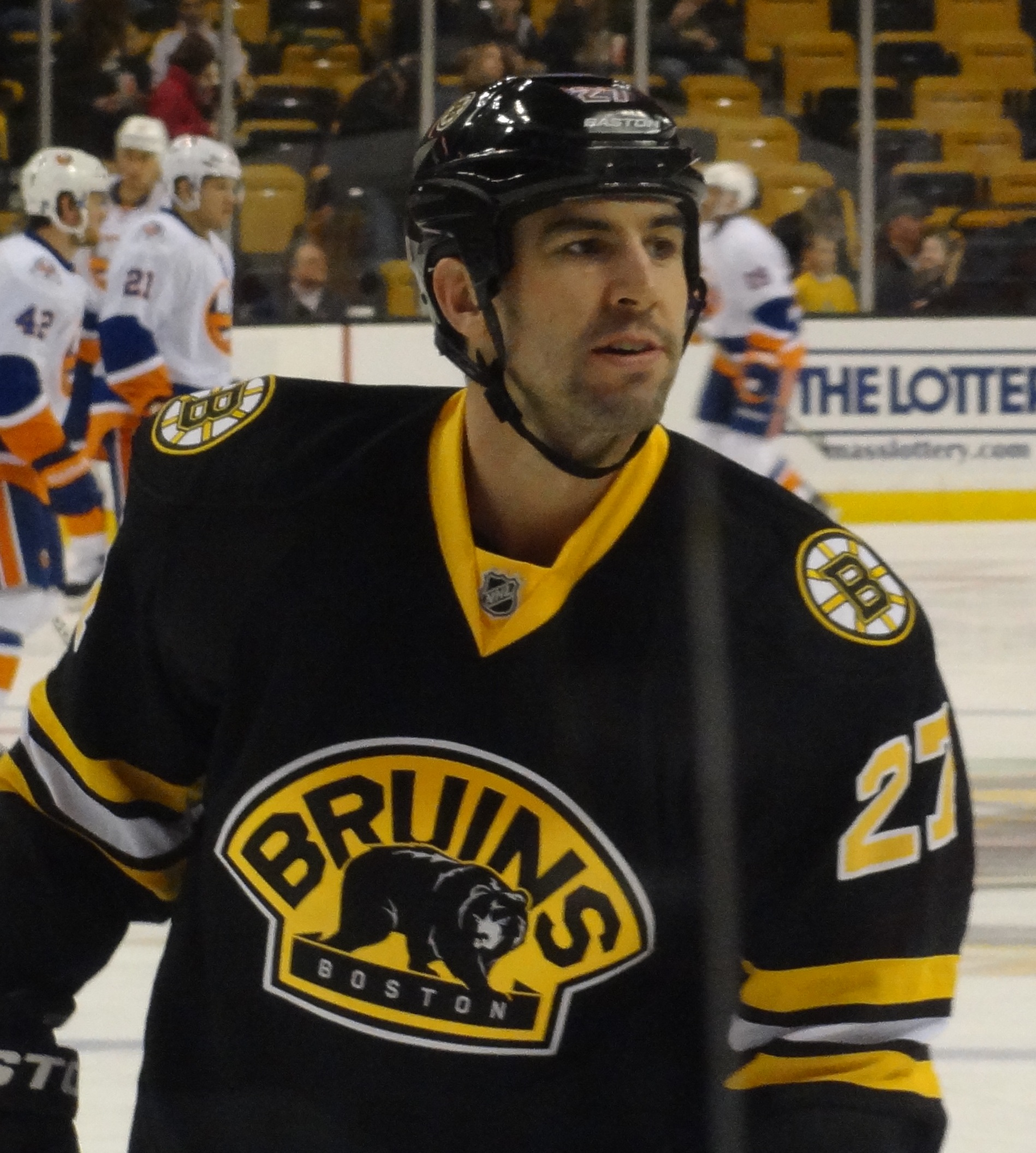
Mike Mottau

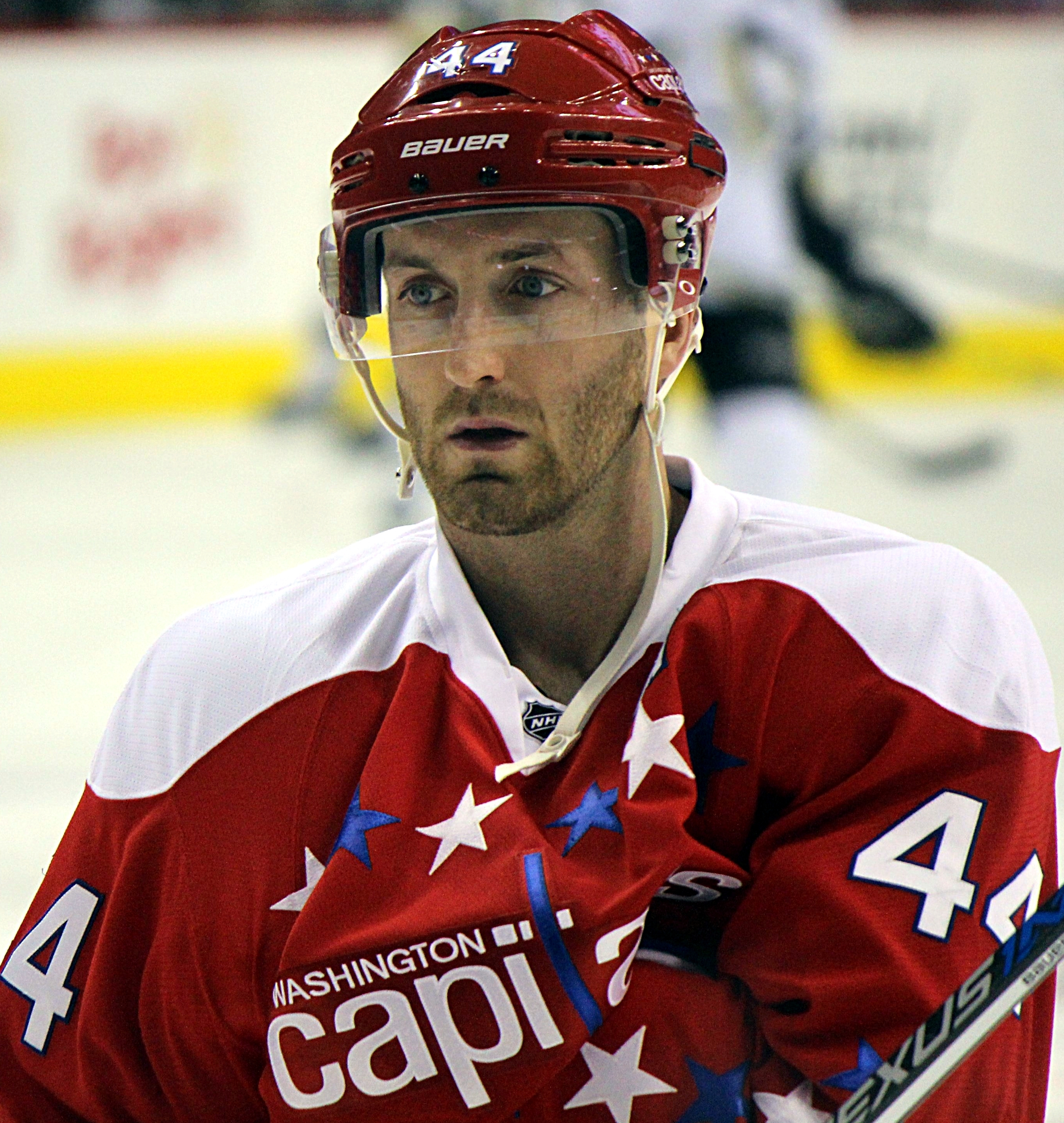
Brooks Orpik

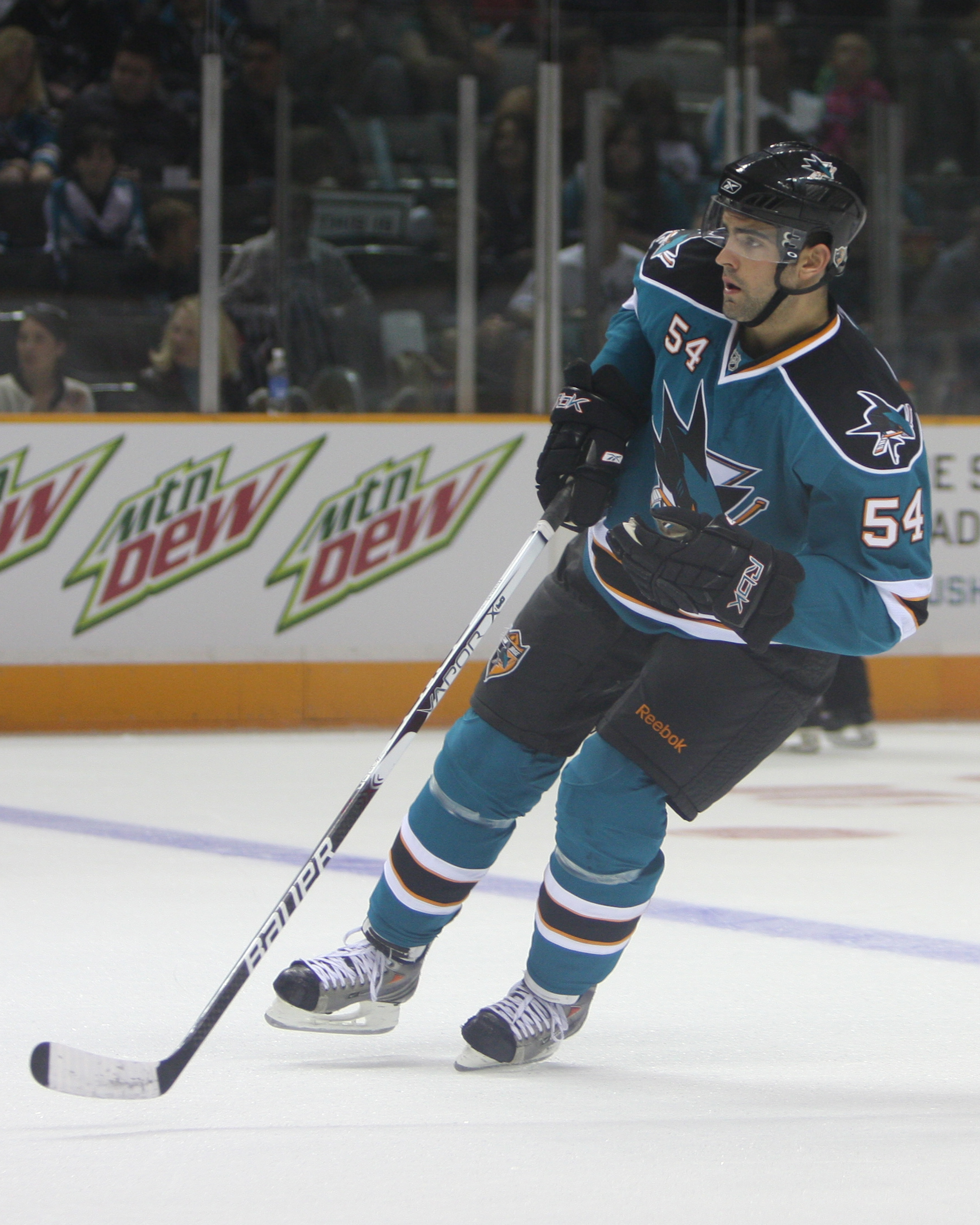
Nick Petrecki

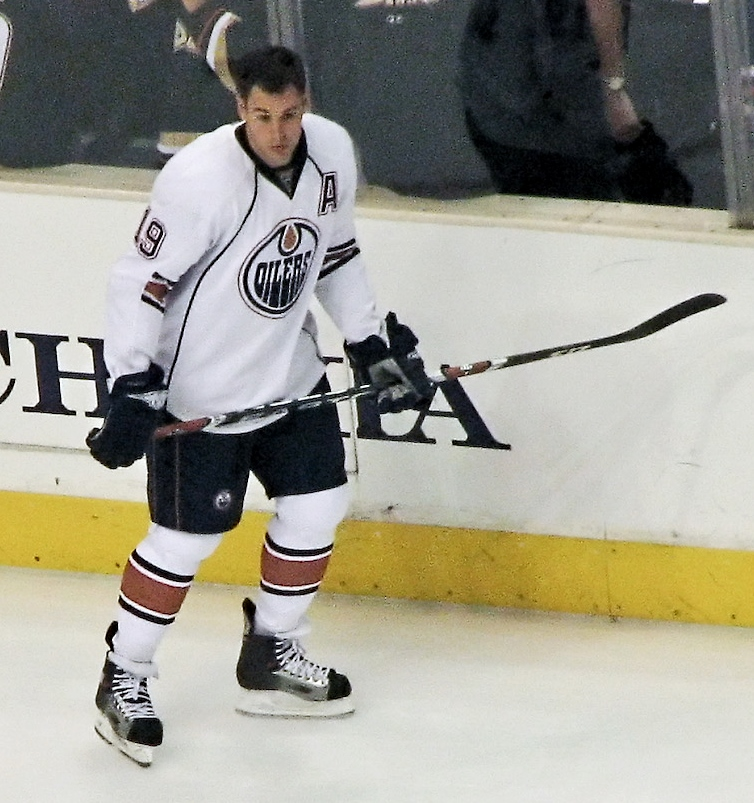
Marty Reasoner

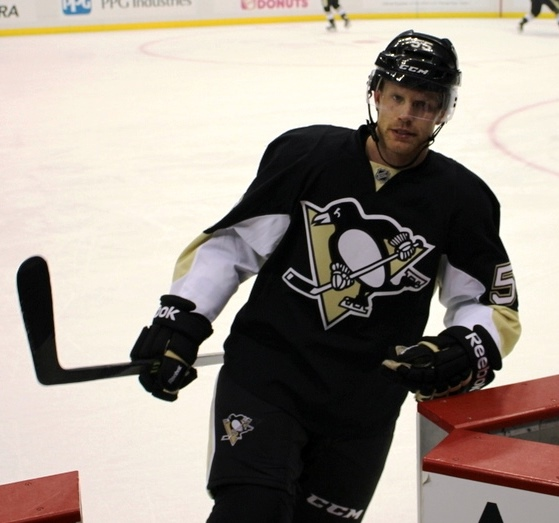
Philip Samuelsson

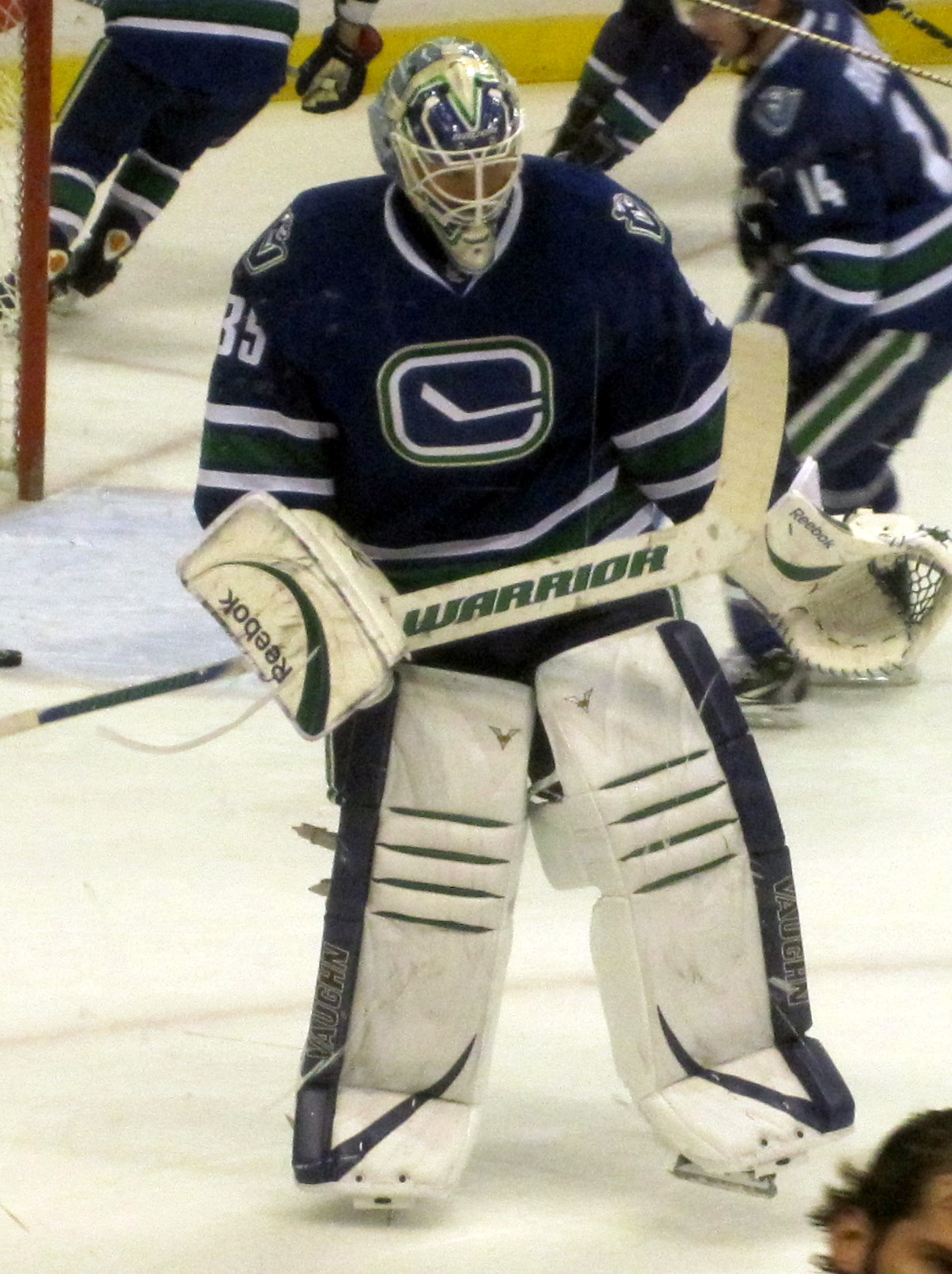
Cory Schneider

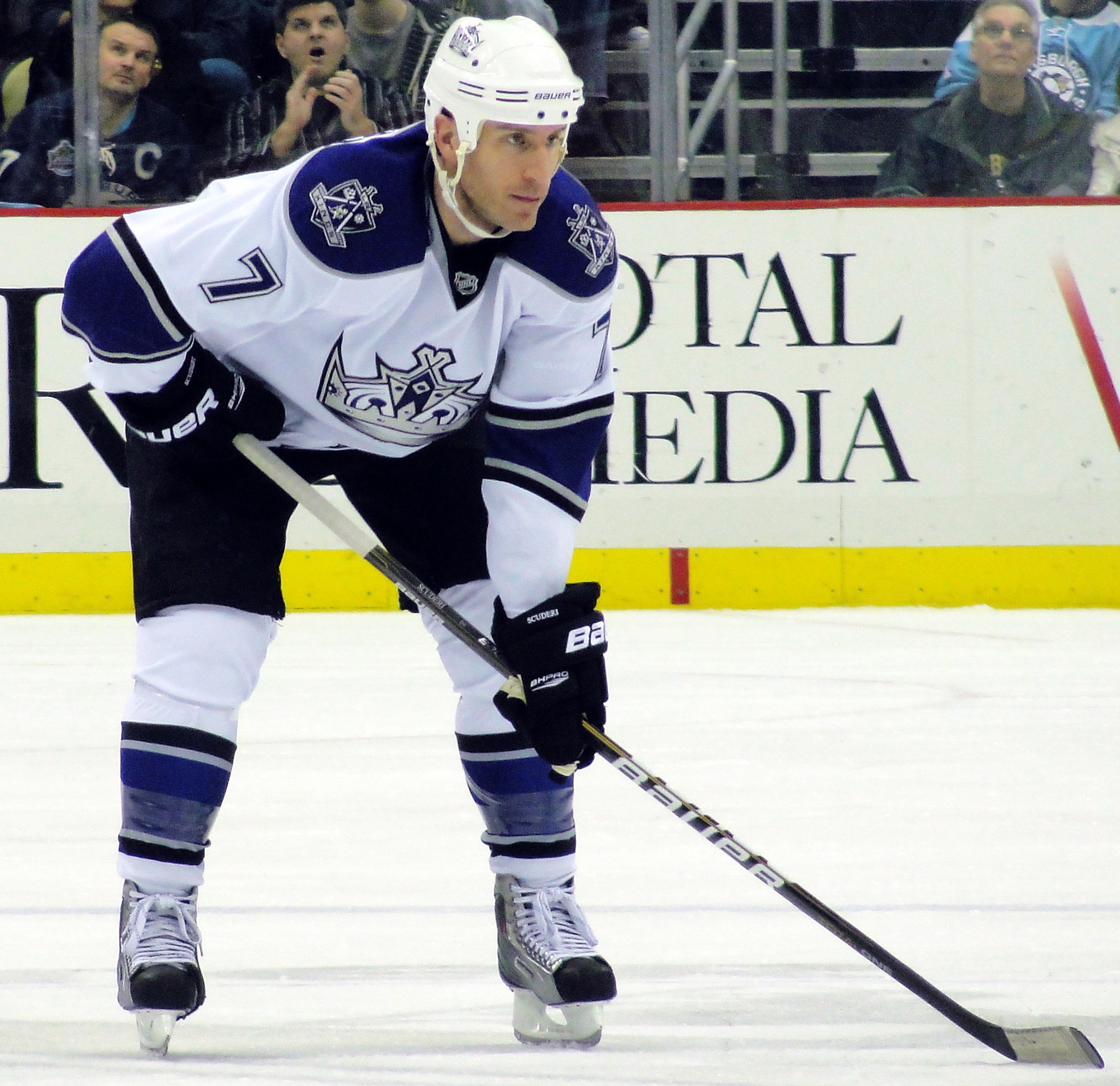
Rob Scuderi

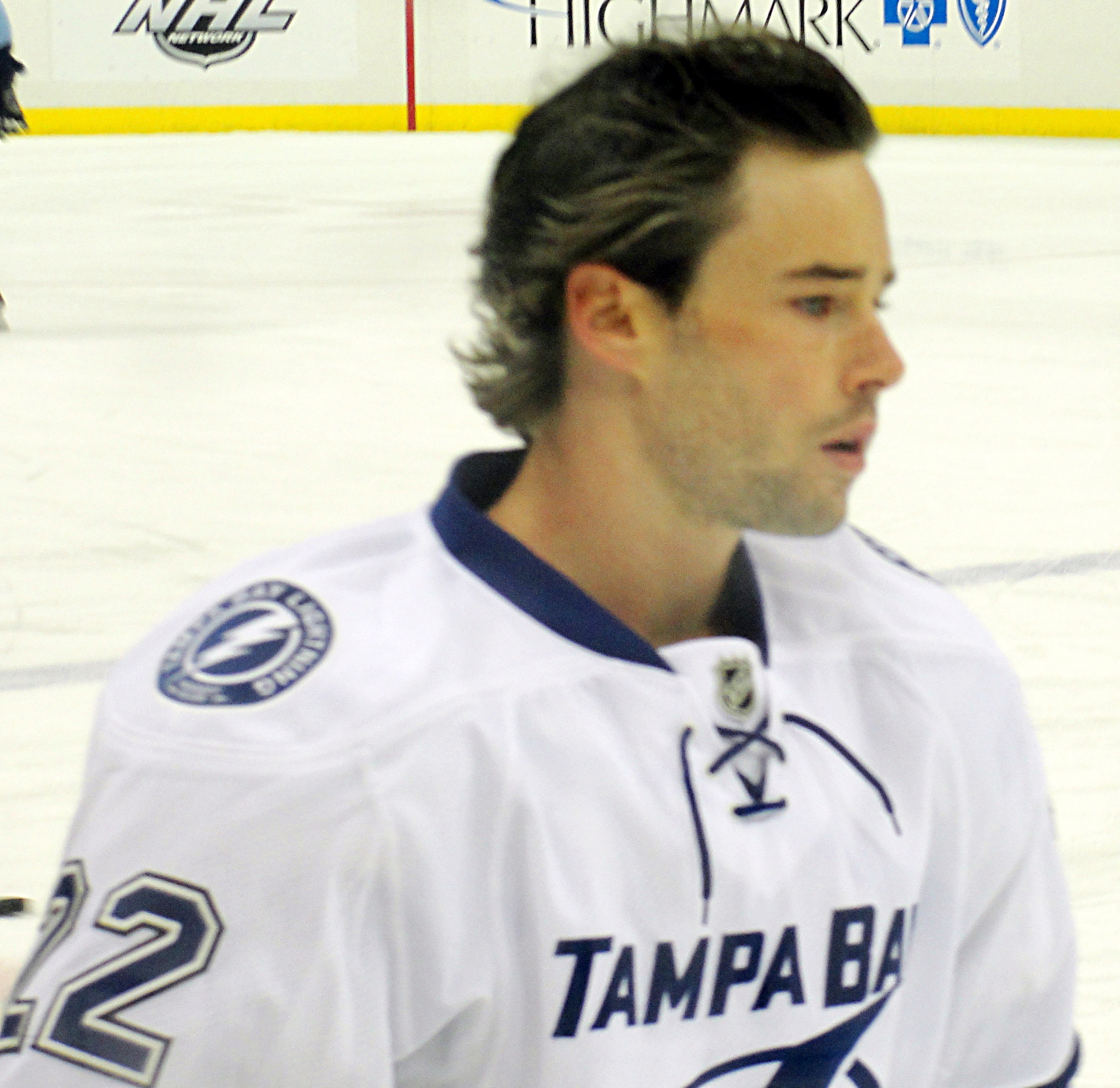
Ryan Shannon

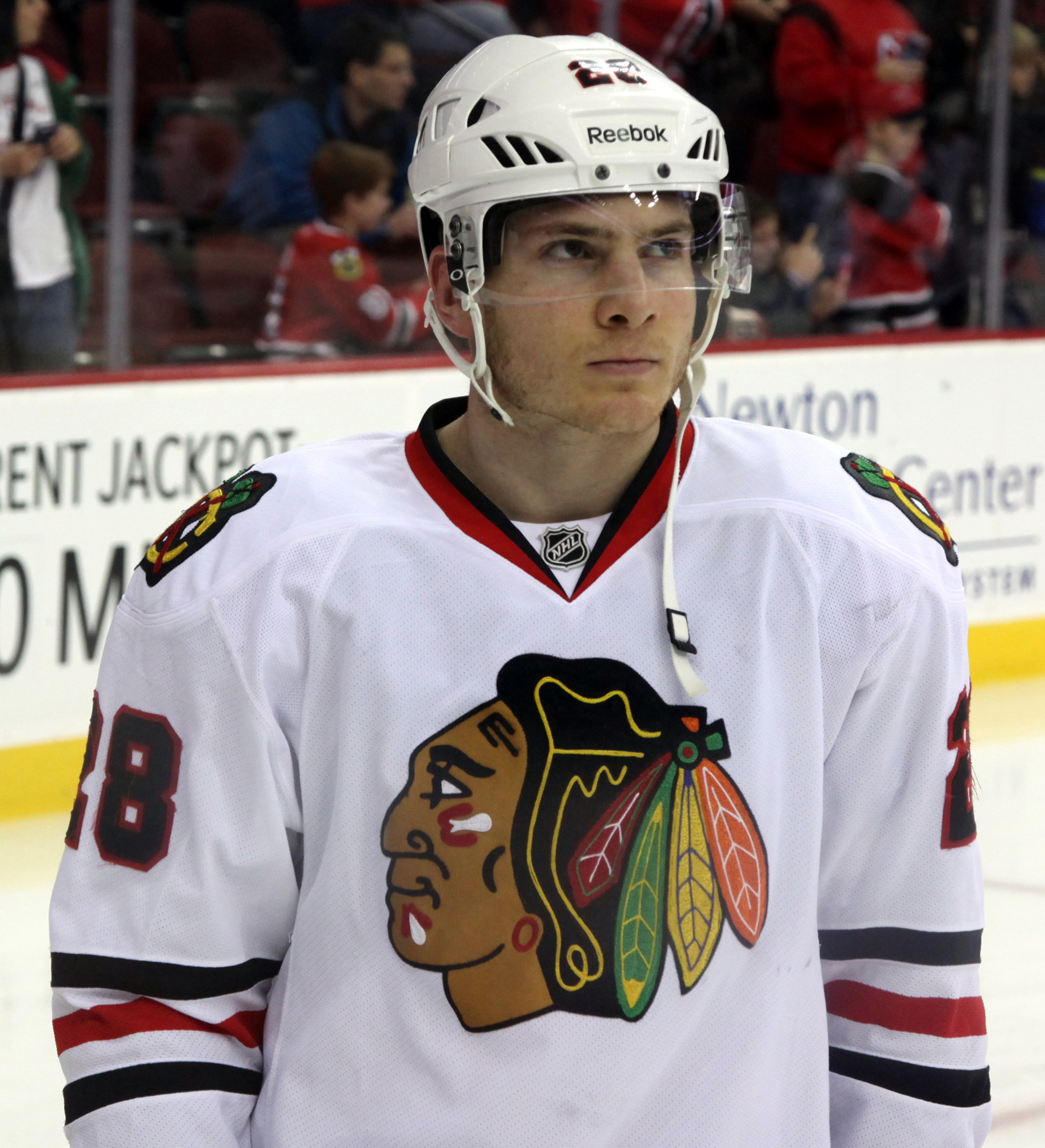
Ben Smith

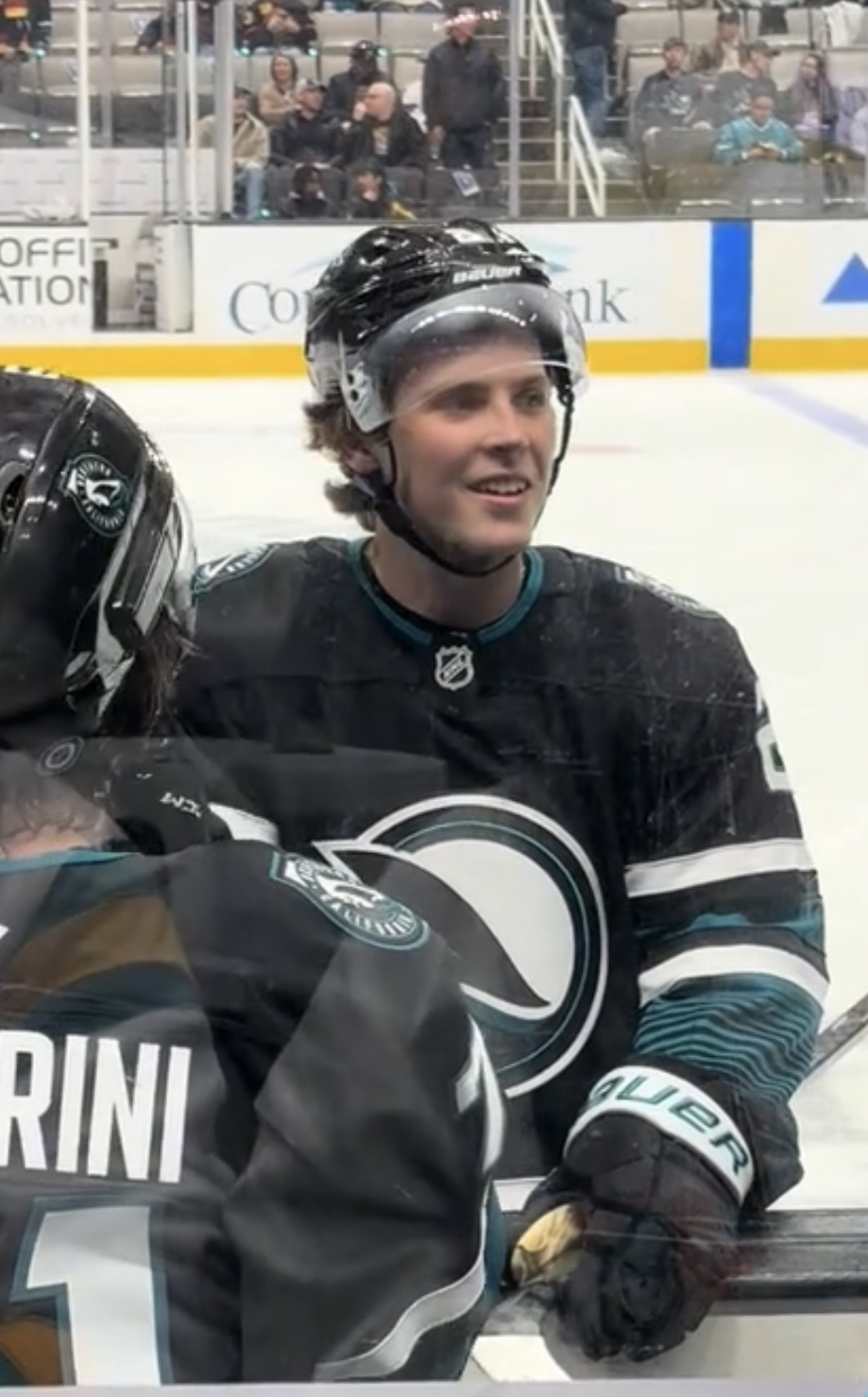
Will Smith

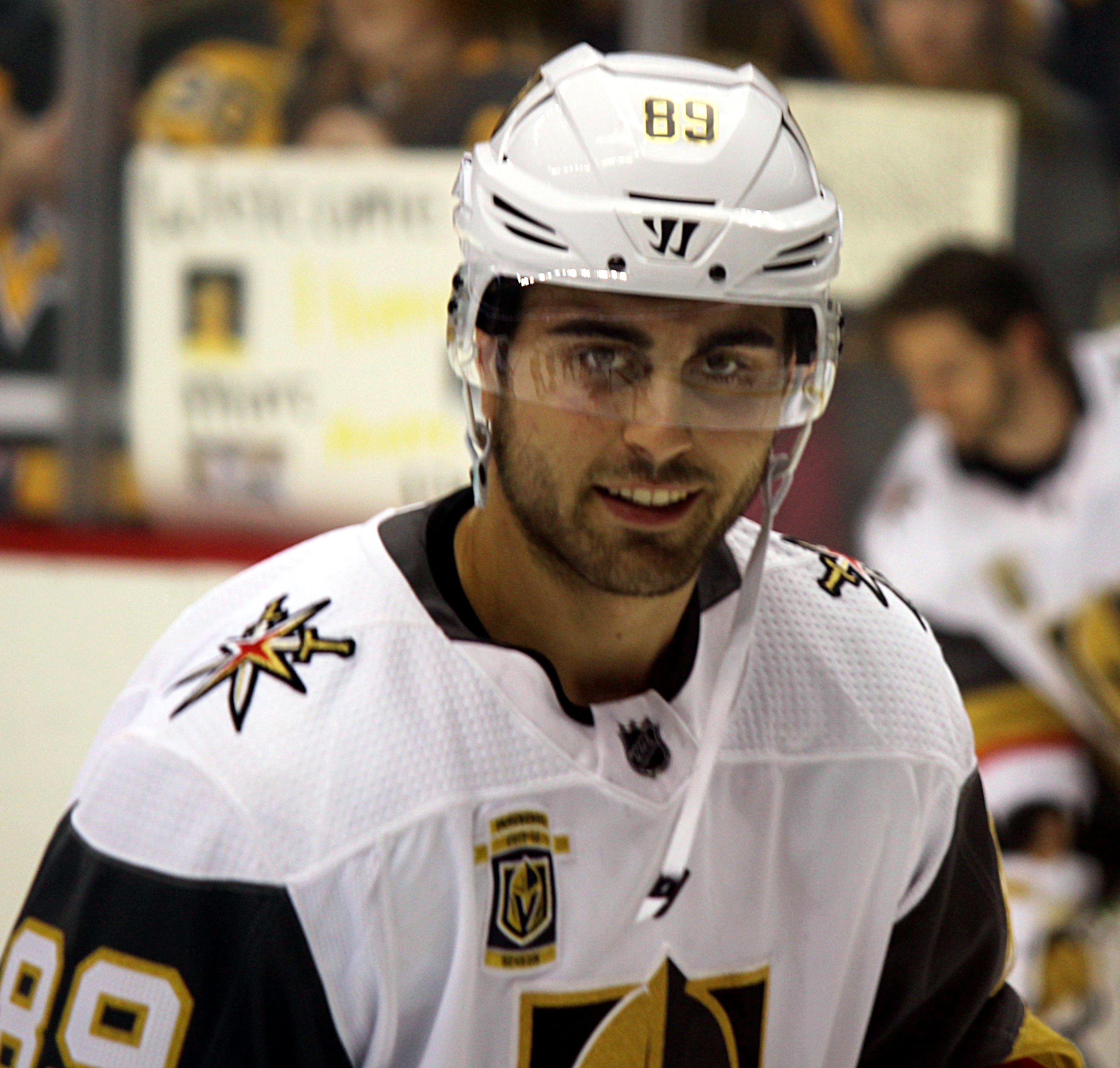
Alex Tuch

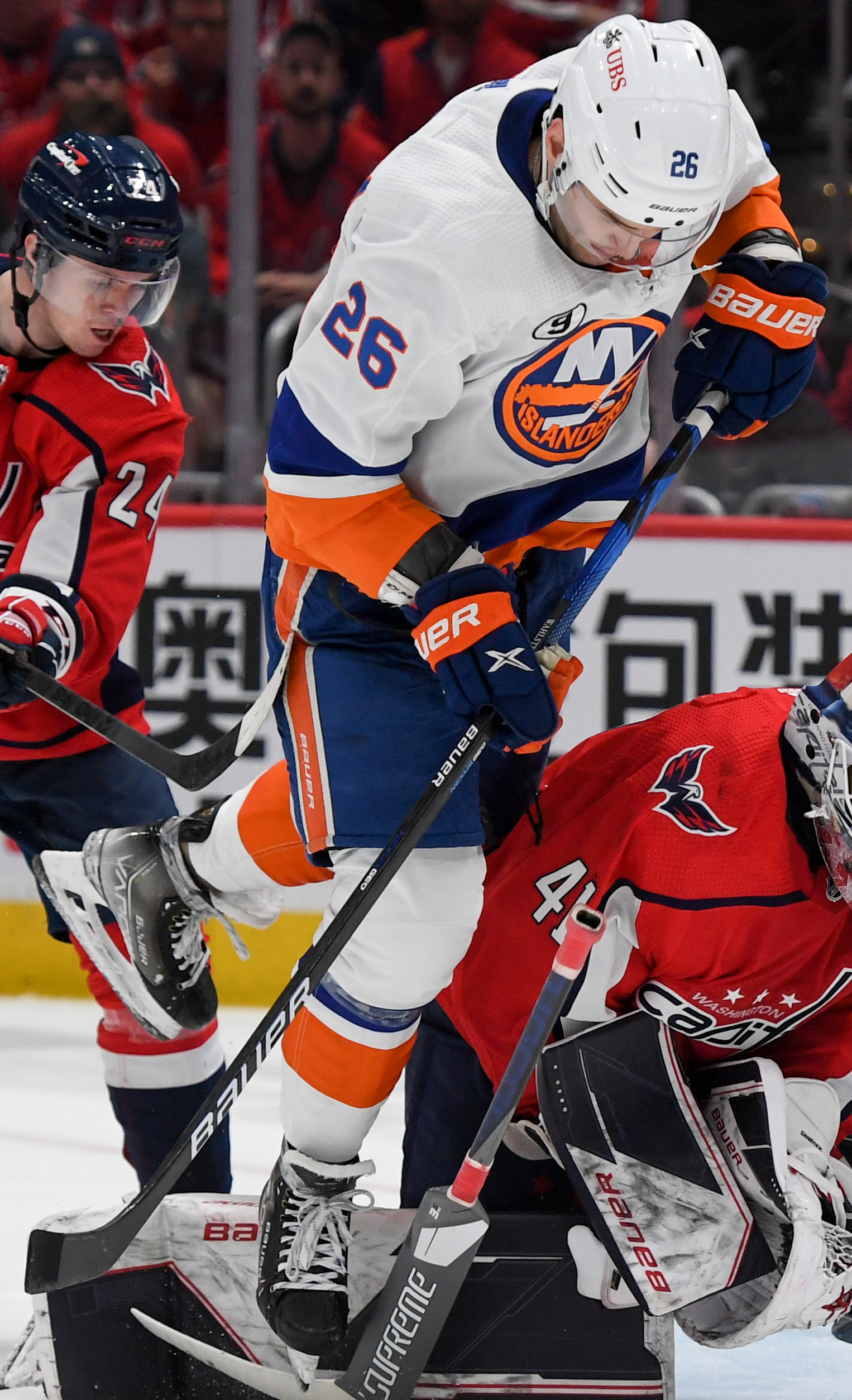
Oliver Wahlstrom

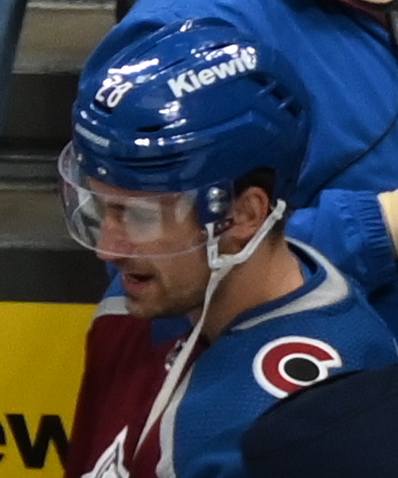
Miles Wood

== See also ==
- Boston College Eagles women's ice hockey
