= Raymond Marchand =

American-born Canadian ice hockey player

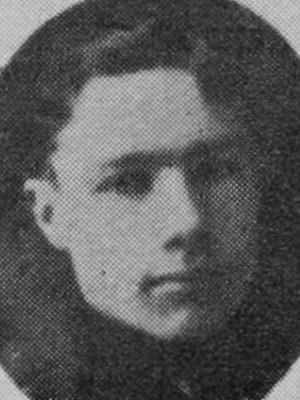
- Marchand with the Cleveland A.C. in 1911–12
- Born: October 18, 1890; Philadelphia, Pennsylvania, United States
- Died: April 6, 1969 (aged 78); Cornwall-on-Hudson, New York, United States
- Height: 5 ft 11 in (180 cm)
- Weight: 160 lb (73 kg; 11 st 6 lb)
- Position: Goaltender
- Caught: Left
- Played for: Toronto Blueshirts; Montreal Canadiens
- Playing career: 1908–1916

Raymond Wilfred Marchand (October 18, 1890 – April 6, 1969) was an American-born Canadian professional ice hockey player, with a hometown of Kingston, Ontario.

== Career ==
He played with the Toronto Blueshirts of the National Hockey Association in the 1912–13 season. Marchand signed with the Montreal Canadiens in 1915 to backup Georges Vezina, and they went on to win the Stanley Cup that season (1916).

In 1924 the United States Military Academy, West Point, N.Y. hired Mr. Marchand to coach its ice hockey and soccer teams, The Black Knights. He held that post for the next 20 years – the second longest tenure of any Army hockey coach before or since. That same year, for the first time in program history, Marchand took his ice hockey team, the Black Knights, across the border to face the Royal Military College of Canada (RMC) in Kingston, Ontario. While the Paladins downed the Cadets, 10–5, in 1935 the Black Knights ended their 15-game losing streak with a 4–4 tie, and in 1939 they enjoyed their first victory, 3–2. The RMC vs USMA game is the most-played rivalry at the academy to this day. The idea for this match-up between the Canadian and American service academies was crafted by then Brig. Gen. Douglas MacArthur and RMC's commandant, Maj. Gen. Sir Archibald Macdonnell.

During Marchand's first seven years coaching the USMA ice hockey team, games were held during the winter on The Plain adjacent to the Gymnasium. During those days, the area was flooded with water in late fall so Stuart Rink could form by midwinter. In 1931, Marchand oversaw the opening of the academy's indoor Smith Rink, where the present day Herbert Hall stands.

Raymond Wilfred Marchand died in Cornwall-on-Hudson, New York on April 6, 1969.

== College Head coaching record ==
=== Ice Hockey ===
Statistics overview
Season	Team	Overall	Conference	Standing	Postseason
Army Cadets Independent (1923–1943)
1923–24	Army	3–5–0			
1924–25	Army	3–3–1			
1925–26	Army	3–6–0			
1926–27	Army	0–3–1			
1927–28	Army	1–8–0			
1928–29	Army	3–9–0			
1929–30	Army	6–3–2			
1930–31	Army	4–6–0			
1931–32	Army	5–4–0			
1932–33	Army	5–4–0			
1933–34	Army	4–6–0			
1934–35	Army	4–5–1			
1935–36	Army	5–4–0			
1936–37	Army	5–5–0			
1937–38	Army	5–4–1			
1938–39	Army	6–4–0			
1939–40	Army	6–2–2			
1940–41	Army	4–6–1			
1941–42	Army	1–11–0			
1942–43	Army	3–8–0			
Army:		76–106–9			
Total:		76–106–9			
National champion Postseason invitational champion Conference regular season champion Conference regular season and conference tournament champion Division regular season champion Division regular season and conference tournament champion Conference tournament champion
