= 1923–24 Bowdoin Polar Bears men's ice hockey season =

- Conference: Independent
- Home ice: Delta Rink

Record
- Overall: 1–3–2
- Home: 1–0–1
- Road: 0–3–1

Coaches and captains
- Captain: Arthur Miguel

The 1923–24 Bowdoin Polar Bears men's ice hockey season was the 5th season of play for the program.

== Season ==
Changes were coming for the hockey program in 1924. The first was a new policy that affected several programs at the school; Bowdoin adopted the increasingly popular one-semester rule that barred freshman from participating in varsity sports until they had completed at least one semester of classes. The school's athletic council announced their decision after a meeting on December 20 and it would be implemented immediately. This caused the team to have to wait for several prospective players who had already been training with the team since the beginning of the month. While another warm winter played havoc with the available ice, the team was trying to sort itself out without a head coach. Al Morrell, who had served as a player/coach for two years, had graduated and was no longer able to serve in that capacity.

By the time the first game rolled around, the Polar Bears had yet to hold a single practice as a group and had been consigned to working out in the gymnasium. It was hardly surprising that Bowdoin was unable to score a single goal in their first two matches, both held in Lewiston, despite all of its starters having played the year before. The weather refused to comply with Bowdoin's desires and a further game with Colby was postponed to a later date.

Bowdoin wasn't able to play its third game until after the exam break though that did allow the freshman players to join the varsity squad. While the lack of practice was still an omnipresent issue, the team was hoping to get onto the right track against Maine. With Berry now manning the pipes, Nichols was a reserve forward along with new entry Cole. The Polar Bears were able to finally get on the scoresheet but they were once more outplayed due to a lack of teamwork. Mercifully, the ice solidified enough to allow Bowdoin to get some training time in for the next game. The awaited match with Colby finally was held on the 13th and the team looked like a completely different team. While starting the exact same players as they had against Maine, Bowdoin led off the scoring and then exploded for 3 goals in the second period. They were matched goal for goal by the Mules and ended regulation with 4 each. Three overtime periods passed without effect and the game was called due to darkness. Bowdoin retained the newfound vigor for their rematch with Maine and demonstrated just how important practice was for the team. In a complete reversal of fortune, Bowdoin dominated the game from the outset, scoring three goals in the first period, two coming from Cutter, to take a commanding lead. The White defense was the star in the second and stopped many a rush from the Blues. Cutter finished off his hat-trick in the third to lead the club to its first win of the season.

Just as the team was getting into its stride, the ice melted and prevented the team from playing all but one game for the rest of the season. The final game was a rematch with Colby that saw both teams slowed by very soft ice. Cutter netter the only goal for the Bears but it was enough to secure a tie. Due to having three of their state series games cancelled, Bowdoin finished with a 1–2–2 record which was good enough for them to finish in a tie for second with Maine (Bates was undefeated in 5 games).

John Whitcomb served as team manager.

== Roster ==
| No. | Nat. | Player | Class | Pos | Height | Weight | DoB | Hometown | Previous team |
|---|---|---|---|---|---|---|---|---|---|
| | (United States) | James Berry | Junior | G | | | 1904-08-19 | Harwich, Massachusetts |
| | (United States) | Gordon Bucknam | Sophomore | RW | | | 1904-09-15 | Newton, Massachusetts |
| | (United States) | Clarence L. Cole | Freshman | D/W | | | 1905-06-28 | Limington, Maine |
| | (United States) | John W. Cronin | Junior | C/RW | | | 1905-02-10 | Lewiston, Maine |
| | (United States) | Charles N. Cutter | Sophomore | C | | | 1904-03-05 | Somerville, Massachusetts |
| | (United States) | J. Reginald Forsythe | Freshman | RW | | | 1902-11-12 | Middlebury, Vermont |
| | (United States) | Roger H. Littlefield | Sophomore | D/W | | | 1903-10-19 | Dorchester, Massachusetts |
| | (United States) | Arthur J. D. Miguel (C) | Senior | D | | | 1901-08-29 | Cambridge, Massachusetts |
| | (United States) | Barrett C. Nichols | Junior | G/F | | | 1901-12-14 | Boston, Massachusetts |
| | (United States) | Howard B. Preble | Junior | LW | | | 1904-07-10 | Everett, Massachusetts |
| | (United States) | William Widen | Sophomore | D | | | 1902-12-09 | Boston, Massachusetts |

== Standings ==
1923–24 Eastern Collegiate ice hockey standings
| | Intercollegiate | | | | | | | Overall | | | | | |
| | GP | W | L | T | Pct. | GF | GA | GP | W | L | T | GF | GA |
|---|---|---|---|---|---|---|---|---|---|---|---|---|---|
| Amherst | 11 | 5 | 5 | 1 | .500 | 16 | 17 | 11 | 5 | 5 | 1 | 16 | 17 |
| Army | 6 | 3 | 3 | 0 | .500 | 15 | 13 | 8 | 3 | 5 | 0 | 23 | 30 |
| Bates | 8 | 8 | 0 | 0 | 1.000 | 31 | 3 | 11 | 9 | 2 | 0 | 34 | 9 |
| Boston College | 1 | 1 | 0 | 0 | 1.000 | 6 | 3 | 18 | 7 | 10 | 1 | 32 | 45 |
| Boston University | 7 | 1 | 6 | 0 | .143 | 10 | 34 | 9 | 1 | 8 | 0 | 11 | 42 |
| Bowdoin | 5 | 1 | 2 | 2 | .400 | 10 | 17 | 6 | 1 | 3 | 2 | 10 | 24 |
| Clarkson | 4 | 1 | 3 | 0 | .250 | 6 | 12 | 7 | 3 | 4 | 0 | 11 | 19 |
| Colby | 7 | 1 | 4 | 2 | .286 | 9 | 18 | 8 | 1 | 5 | 2 | 11 | 21 |
| Cornell | 4 | 2 | 2 | 0 | .500 | 22 | 11 | 4 | 2 | 2 | 0 | 22 | 11 |
| Dartmouth | – | – | – | – | – | – | – | 17 | 10 | 5 | 2 | 81 | 32 |
| Hamilton | – | – | – | – | – | – | – | 12 | 7 | 3 | 2 | – | – |
| Harvard | 9 | 6 | 3 | 0 | .667 | 35 | 19 | 18 | 6 | 10 | 2 | – | – |
| Maine | 7 | 3 | 4 | 0 | .429 | 20 | 18 | 12 | 4 | 8 | 0 | 33 | 60 |
| Massachusetts Agricultural | 8 | 2 | 6 | 0 | .250 | 17 | 38 | 9 | 3 | 6 | 0 | 19 | 38 |
| Middlebury | 5 | 0 | 4 | 1 | .100 | 2 | 10 | 7 | 0 | 6 | 1 | 3 | 16 |
| MIT | 4 | 0 | 4 | 0 | .000 | 2 | 27 | 4 | 0 | 4 | 0 | 2 | 27 |
| Pennsylvania | 6 | 1 | 4 | 1 | .250 | 6 | 23 | 8 | 1 | 5 | 2 | 8 | 28 |
| Princeton | 13 | 8 | 5 | 0 | .615 | 35 | 20 | 18 | 12 | 6 | 0 | 63 | 28 |
| Rensselaer | 5 | 2 | 3 | 0 | .400 | 5 | 31 | 5 | 2 | 3 | 0 | 5 | 31 |
| Saint Michael's | – | – | – | – | – | – | – | – | – | – | – | – | – |
| Syracuse | 2 | 1 | 1 | 0 | .500 | 5 | 11 | 6 | 2 | 4 | 0 | 11 | 24 |
| Union | 4 | 2 | 2 | 0 | .500 | 13 | 10 | 5 | 3 | 2 | 0 | 18 | 12 |
| Williams | 11 | 2 | 7 | 2 | .273 | 11 | 22 | 13 | 4 | 7 | 2 | 18 | 24 |
| Yale | 15 | 14 | 1 | 0 | .933 | 60 | 12 | 23 | 18 | 4 | 1 | 80 | 33 |
| YMCA College | 6 | 1 | 5 | 0 | .167 | 6 | 39 | 7 | 2 | 5 | 0 | 11 | 39 |

== Schedule and results ==
| Date | Opponent | Site | Decision | Result | Record |
Regular Season
| January 15 | at Bates* | Lake Andrews Rink • Lewiston, Maine | Nichols | L 0–7 | 0–1–0 |
| January 18 | at St. Dominique* | Bartlett Street Rink • Lewiston, Maine | Nichols | L 0–5 | 0–2–0 |
| February 8 | at Maine* | Alumni Field Rink • Orono, Maine | Berry | L 1–6 | 0–3–0 |
| February 13 | Colby* | Delta Rink • Brunswick, Maine | Berry | T 4–4 ^{3OT} | 0–3–1 |
| February 16 | Maine* | Delta Rink • Brunswick, Maine | Berry | W 4–1 | 1–3–1 |
| February 25 | at Colby* | Colby Rink • Waterville, Maine | Berry | T 1–1 | 1–3–2 |
*Non-conference game.

== Scoring statistics ==
| Name | Position | Games | Goals |
|---|---|---|---|
| Charles Cutter | C | 4 | 6 |
| John Cronin | C/RW | 6 | 2 |
| Clarence Cole | D/LW/RW | 4 | 1 |
| Howard Preble | LW | 6 | 1 |
| Reginald Forsythe | RW | 1 | 0 |
| Gordon Bucknam | RW | 3 | 0 |
| James Berry | G | 4 | 0 |
| Roger Littlefield | D/LW/RW | 4 | 0 |
| Barrett Nichols | G/RW | 4 | 0 |
| Arthur Miguel | D | 6 | 0 |
| William Widen | D | 6 | 0 |
| Total | | | 10 |
