= 1923–24 MIT Engineers men's ice hockey season =

- Conference: Independent
- Home ice: Boston Arena

Record
- Overall: 0–4–0
- Road: 0–2–0
- Neutral: 0–2–0

Coaches and captains
- Head coach: Al Blacklock
- Captain: Denton Massey

The 1923–24 MIT Engineers men's ice hockey season was the 23rd season of play for the program.

== Season ==
Looking to improve upon a solid performance the year before, very few things went right for the Engineers in 1924. After opening the year with two massive defeats, the team wasn't able to play a single game for almost four weeks. Once they returned in early February the team was so out of sorts that they went scoreless against a down Army team before being embarrassed in their final game of the year.

Theodore H. Butler served as team manager with James Carey and Martin Walter as his assistants.

== Roster ==
No.	Nat.	Player	Class	Pos	Height	Weight	DoB	Hometown	Previous team
	(United States)	Joseph G. Dalton	Senior	C			1899-11-12	Brookline, Massachusetts
		Cornelius M. Flynn	Junior	D
		Walter O. Locke	Freshman	LW
	(United States)	Gardner B. McPherson	Senior	RW			1903-04-05	Brookline, Massachusetts
	(Canada)	Denton Massey (C)	Senior	G			1900-06-20	Toronto, Ontario
		Edwin J. Moulton	Sophomore	RW
	(Canada)	Philip C. Niles	Junior	D			1905-05-13	Toronto, Ontario
		David D. Peene	Junior	D
	(United States)	Preston M. Putnam	Junior				1902-08-20	Danvers, Massachusetts
	(United States)	Sumner S. Randell Jr.	Sophomore	LW			1904-02-19	Quincy, Massachusetts
		John P. Sawyer	Junior	D
	(United States)	Otto B. Wiessner	Sophomore	LW			1904-03-22	Brookline, Massachusetts

== Standings ==
1923–24 Eastern Collegiate ice hockey standings
	Intercollegiate							Overall					
	GP	W	L	T	Pct.	GF	GA	GP	W	L	T	GF	GA
Amherst	11	5	5	1	.500	16	17	11	5	5	1	16	17
Army	6	3	3	0	.500	15	13	8	3	5	0	23	30
Bates	8	8	0	0	1.000	31	3	11	9	2	0	34	9
Boston College	1	1	0	0	1.000	6	3	18	7	10	1	32	45
Boston University	7	1	6	0	.143	10	34	9	1	8	0	11	42
Bowdoin	5	1	2	2	.400	10	17	6	1	3	2	10	24
Clarkson	4	1	3	0	.250	6	12	7	3	4	0	11	19
Colby	7	1	4	2	.286	9	18	8	1	5	2	11	21
Cornell	4	2	2	0	.500	22	11	4	2	2	0	22	11
Dartmouth	–	–	–	–	–	–	–	17	10	5	2	81	32
Hamilton	–	–	–	–	–	–	–	12	7	3	2	–	–
Harvard	9	6	3	0	.667	35	19	18	6	10	2	–	–
Maine	7	3	4	0	.429	20	18	12	4	8	0	33	60
Massachusetts Agricultural	8	2	6	0	.250	17	38	9	3	6	0	19	38
Middlebury	5	0	4	1	.100	2	10	7	0	6	1	3	16
MIT	4	0	4	0	.000	2	27	4	0	4	0	2	27
Pennsylvania	6	1	4	1	.250	6	23	8	1	5	2	8	28
Princeton	13	8	5	0	.615	35	20	18	12	6	0	63	28
Rensselaer	5	2	3	0	.400	5	31	5	2	3	0	5	31
Saint Michael's	–	–	–	–	–	–	–	–	–	–	–	–	–
Syracuse	2	1	1	0	.500	5	11	6	2	4	0	11	24
Union	4	2	2	0	.500	13	10	5	3	2	0	18	12
Williams	11	2	7	2	.273	11	22	13	4	7	2	18	24
Yale	15	14	1	0	.933	60	12	23	18	4	1	80	33
YMCA College	6	1	5	0	.167	6	39	7	2	5	0	11	39

== Schedule and results ==
Date	Opponent	Site	Result	Record
Regular Season
December 11	vs. Boston University*	Boston Arena • Boston, Massachusetts	L 1–7	0–1–0
January 9	vs. Harvard*	Boston Arena • Boston, Massachusetts	L 0–7	0–2–0
February 2	at Army*	Stuart Rink • West Point, New York	L 0–2	0–3–0
February 10	at Dartmouth*	Occom Pond • Hanover, New Hampshire	L 1–11	0–4–0
*Non-conference game.
