= 1923–24 Massachusetts Agricultural Aggies men's ice hockey season =

- Conference: Independent
- Home ice: Alumni Field Rink

Record
- Overall: 3–6–0
- Home: 1–2–0
- Road: 2–4–0

Coaches and captains
- Head coach: Doc Gordon
- Captain(s): Eliot Goldsmith; Eric Lamb (acting after Feb. 7)

The 1923–24 Massachusetts Agricultural Aggies men's ice hockey season was the 16th season of play for the program. The Aggies were coached by Doc Gordon in his first season.

== Season ==
After just one season as a coach, Herbert Collins left in the offseason to take over as director of athletics for Natick High School. In his place the school turned to another former Aggie and Howard "Doc" Gordon agreed to take over control of the ice hockey team. He got news early in the year as 30 men showed up for the first practice in December, the largest group of candidates the program had yet seen. Several veteran players were returning, led by team captain Eliot Goldsmith, and would be augmented by several good prospects from the freshman team. The biggest concern, however, was in goal and the team knew that would have to resolve their netminding position if they had a chance of competing. MAC had set up a very difficult schedule with several games against strong programs.

Heading into the first game at Dartmouth, the Aggies had very little practice time owing to a lack of ice. The team had tried to get over to use the Boston Arena during the winter break, however, the rink was in high demand from many other colleges and organizations and MAC could only get in one full practice session. Once ice did form on Alumni Field, coach Gordon tried to cram as much training as he could into a short span of time. After a temperature spike caused the game to be postponed until a later date, the Aggies returned home and played host to Amherst. Due to the weather, the game was played on a campus pond rather than the rink and the rough ice slowed the game to a crawl. Several stoppages were needed to retrieve the puck when it was sent over the low boards that further deadened the game. Neither goaltender was busy during the match as both teams had trouble getting to the offense. The first goal was scored by Amherst through a deflection off of one of the MAC players and followed by about 20 minutes of even but scoreless play. In the third, Kane, the Aggie goaltender, stumbled to the ice but managed to make the save. The referee, Granger, was slow in getting to the net and awarded the goal to the Sabrinas. Neither team appeared happy with the decision but both had to accept the ruling. It was somewhat fortunate that the second goal didn't decide the game as it prevented a controversial outcome, but it still left the Aggies with a loss to open the year.

Weather caused two further games to be cancelled and the team scrambled to find a place that had usable ice. Eventually they managed to secure a match with the Albany Country Club. While the golfers were former college players themselves, the soft ice gave the game a similar character to the Amherst match and provided the Aggies with an unexpected advantage. Goldsmith and Crosby put up a stirling performance on the blueline while Kane came into his own with several stellar saves. The defensive work allowed the forwards the time needed to find their game. Lamb and Nicoll scored in the third period of the abbreviated game to give the Aggies the win. The team then took a night train and had little sleep before their next game the following day with Hamilton. The Continentals got off to a quick start, scoring twice in the first period. They added two more markers in the second to just one for MAC, leaving the visitors looking up at a 3-goal disadvantage. The team played about as well as could be expected and scored twice in the final period but each goal was matched but one from Hamilton and the Aggies were unable to wear down their opponents.

During the winter break the team headed down to Connecticut to take on Yale and the differences between the two teams could not have been more stark. After a scoreless first period, Yale's offense broke through in the second, scoring 4 goals. The Elis swept MAC off of the ice in the third with a further 6 markers. The blame for the colossal defeat was laid on the size of Bulldog team as Yale could rely on many more substitutes than MAC to keep their players fresh throughout the match. The following week the team played host to YMCA College and thing began to look up for the Aggies in the second. During a scrum in front of the Maroon cage, however, Goldsmith was knocked to the ice and was bleeding profusely from his eye. The captain had been cut by a stick and was taken to Cooley Dickinson Hospital in nearby Northampton. Sam Gordon took Goldsmith's place in the lineup for the remainder of the match. The team redoubled its efforts and scored four goals in the middle from while adding another three in the third.

With Goldsmith still receiving treatment and out for the rest of the year, Gordon started the next game at Army and the team played its fastest game of the year. The MAC forwards bombarded the Cadet cage with shots all game long but could not pull away from the home team. The teams exchanged leads in the first two periods and entered the third ties at 2-all. Army got its second lead with about 10 minutes to play and sent the Aggies scrambling for a reply. MAC desperately tried to win the match for their fallen captain and launched about 20 shots at the Army net in the final five minutes but nothing got past the Cadet goalkeeper. The next game saw the Aggies finally get their match with Dartmouth and suffered their second embarrassing loss of the year. While the margin was same as seen against Yale, the Indians were obviously the better of the two from the jump and even the presence of Goldsmith wouldn not have changed the outcome. The Greens were up by 2 goals before 90 seconds had elapsed and then toyed with the Aggies for the remainder of the match.

MAC began the final week of the season with a home stand against Williams. The two teams were the equal of the other for the first two periods and entered the final frame with one goal apiece. John Stephenson took over the game in the third, scoring 4 goals in quick succession and putting the match out of reach for the Aggies. The team ended the year with a short jaunt to the Lord Jeffs' rink for a rematch with Amherst. While the game started slow, the Aggies picked up the pace as the match wore on. MAC played as a team throughout the evening and ensured that Lamb's solo marker was all that was needed for a victory.

Leon Regan served as team manager.

== Roster ==
No.	Nat.	Player	Class	Pos	Height	Weight	DoB	Hometown	Previous team
	(United States)	John S. Crosby	Junior	D			1902-12-11	Arlington, Massachusetts
	(United States)	Leland L. Currier	Junior				1904-05-16	Marblehead, Massachusetts
	(United States)	Eliot G. Goldsmith (C)	Senior	D				Brookline, Massachusetts
	(United States)	Samuel F. Gordon	Sophomore	D				Ipswich, Massachusetts
	(United States)	Edward A. Kane	Senior	G				Westfield, Massachusetts
	(United States)	Eric F. Lamb (C)	Senior	C				Waban, Massachusetts
	(United States)	Herbert F. Moberg	Sophomore	LW				Brockton, Massachusetts
	(United States)	Arthur C. Nicholl	Senior	RW				Quincy, Massachusetts
	(United States)	Cary D. Palmer	Sophomore	G				Grafton, Vermont
	(United States)	Dudley D. Sprague	Junior	LW			1902-03-26	Melrose, Massachusetts
	(United States)	Milton W. Taylor	Junior				1904-01-12	Chatham, Massachusetts
	(United States)	Charles J. Tewhill	Senior	D/LW			1899-08-06	Florence, Massachusetts
	(United States)	Windsor B. Wade	Sophomore	LW			1902-06-26	Andover, Massachusetts

== Standings ==
1923–24 Eastern Collegiate ice hockey standings
	Intercollegiate							Overall					
	GP	W	L	T	Pct.	GF	GA	GP	W	L	T	GF	GA
Amherst	11	5	5	1	.500	16	17	11	5	5	1	16	17
Army	6	3	3	0	.500	15	13	8	3	5	0	23	30
Bates	8	8	0	0	1.000	31	3	11	9	2	0	34	9
Boston College	1	1	0	0	1.000	6	3	18	7	10	1	32	45
Boston University	7	1	6	0	.143	10	34	9	1	8	0	11	42
Bowdoin	5	1	2	2	.400	10	17	6	1	3	2	10	24
Clarkson	4	1	3	0	.250	6	12	7	3	4	0	11	19
Colby	7	1	4	2	.286	9	18	8	1	5	2	11	21
Cornell	4	2	2	0	.500	22	11	4	2	2	0	22	11
Dartmouth	–	–	–	–	–	–	–	17	10	5	2	81	32
Hamilton	–	–	–	–	–	–	–	12	7	3	2	–	–
Harvard	9	6	3	0	.667	35	19	18	6	10	2	–	–
Maine	7	3	4	0	.429	20	18	12	4	8	0	33	60
Massachusetts Agricultural	8	2	6	0	.250	17	38	9	3	6	0	19	38
Middlebury	5	0	4	1	.100	2	10	7	0	6	1	3	16
MIT	4	0	4	0	.000	2	27	4	0	4	0	2	27
Pennsylvania	6	1	4	1	.250	6	23	8	1	5	2	8	28
Princeton	13	8	5	0	.615	35	20	18	12	6	0	63	28
Rensselaer	5	2	3	0	.400	5	31	5	2	3	0	5	31
Saint Michael's	–	–	–	–	–	–	–	–	–	–	–	–	–
Syracuse	2	1	1	0	.500	5	11	6	2	4	0	11	24
Union	4	2	2	0	.500	13	10	5	3	2	0	18	12
Williams	11	2	7	2	.273	11	22	13	4	7	2	18	24
Yale	15	14	1	0	.933	60	12	23	18	4	1	80	33
YMCA College	6	1	5	0	.167	6	39	7	2	5	0	11	39

== Schedule and results ==
Date	Opponent	Site	Result	Record
Regular Season
January 15	Amherst*	Campus Pond • Amherst, Massachusetts	L 0–2	0–1–0
January 25	at Albany Country Club*	Empire Rink • Albany, New York	W 2–0	1–1–0
January 26	at Hamilton*	Russell Sage Rink • Clinton, New York	L 3–6	1–2–0
February 2	at Yale*	New Haven Arena • New Haven, Connecticut	L 1–10	1–3–0
February 7	YMCA College*	Alumni Field Rink • Amherst, Massachusetts	W 7–1	2–3–0
February 9	at Army*	Stuart Rink • West Point, New York	L 2–3	2–4–0
February 16	at Dartmouth*	Occom Pond • Hanover, New Hampshire	L 2–11	2–5–0
February 19	Williams*	Alumni Field Rink • Amherst, Massachusetts	L 1–5	2–6–0
February 21	at Amherst*	Pratt Field Rink • Amherst, Massachusetts	W 1–0	3–6–0
*Non-conference game.
