= 1923–24 RPI Engineers men's ice hockey season =

- Conference: Independent
- Home ice: RPI Rink

Record
- Overall: 2–3–0
- Home: 2–0–0
- Road: 0–3–0

Coaches and captains
- Captain(s): John Reuther; Dureau (acting after Feb. 1)

The 1923–24 RPI Engineers men's ice hockey season was the 21st season of play for the program.

== Season ==
For the first time since before the war, Rensselaer was left without a hockey coach. After the departure of Leroy Clark, the squad was ostensibly run by team captain John Reuther. He, along with the team manager, put together a normal slate of games for the Engineers and the team set about practicing once the weather became cold enough. Unfortunately, while the team was able to get some practice in, their match with YMCA College had to be postponed. That meant Middlebury would be the first opponent of the season and that couldn't have turned out better for RPI. The Engineers won the match 2–0 and then prepared themselves for YMCA the following week. The game was held in a snowstorm but the ice was good enough to see Rensselaer earn its second victory of the year.

With the program on the cusp of its first winning season in 17 years, RPI had a 2-week break before they hit the road and met Hamilton. Unfortunately, in the interim, Reuther was forced to leave the team. Dureau was appointed acting captain but was unable to prevent RPI from being routed in the match. While the team may have been able to mollify itself with the fact that the Continentals were one of the best programs in the country, their subsequent opponents could not say the same. A week later, still without their captain, the team faced Cornell and were completely swept off of the ice. The Big Red scored 13 goals and, while Bolieau scored once for RPI, it didn't make the final score any less embarrassing. The final game was little better and Rensselaer resumed their capital district rivalry against Union with an 0–7 drubbing.

== Roster ==
No.	Nat.	Player	Class	Pos	Height	Weight	DoB	Hometown	Previous team
		Allis		LW
		Cliffton W. Bolieau		C
		William Cramp		D
		Dureau		RW
	(United States)	William N. Farquhar	Freshman	D			1904-08-31	Fort Covington, New York
		Lawler		G
	(United States)	John Reuther (C)						Bridgeport, Connecticut

== Standings ==
1923–24 Eastern Collegiate ice hockey standings
	Intercollegiate							Overall					
	GP	W	L	T	Pct.	GF	GA	GP	W	L	T	GF	GA
Amherst	11	5	5	1	.500	16	17	11	5	5	1	16	17
Army	6	3	3	0	.500	15	13	8	3	5	0	23	30
Bates	8	8	0	0	1.000	31	3	11	9	2	0	34	9
Boston College	1	1	0	0	1.000	6	3	18	7	10	1	32	45
Boston University	7	1	6	0	.143	10	34	9	1	8	0	11	42
Bowdoin	5	1	2	2	.400	10	17	6	1	3	2	10	24
Clarkson	4	1	3	0	.250	6	12	7	3	4	0	11	19
Colby	7	1	4	2	.286	9	18	8	1	5	2	11	21
Cornell	4	2	2	0	.500	22	11	4	2	2	0	22	11
Dartmouth	–	–	–	–	–	–	–	17	10	5	2	81	32
Hamilton	–	–	–	–	–	–	–	12	7	3	2	–	–
Harvard	9	6	3	0	.667	35	19	18	6	10	2	–	–
Maine	7	3	4	0	.429	20	18	12	4	8	0	33	60
Massachusetts Agricultural	8	2	6	0	.250	17	38	9	3	6	0	19	38
Middlebury	5	0	4	1	.100	2	10	7	0	6	1	3	16
MIT	4	0	4	0	.000	2	27	4	0	4	0	2	27
Pennsylvania	6	1	4	1	.250	6	23	8	1	5	2	8	28
Princeton	13	8	5	0	.615	35	20	18	12	6	0	63	28
Rensselaer	5	2	3	0	.400	5	31	5	2	3	0	5	31
Saint Michael's	–	–	–	–	–	–	–	–	–	–	–	–	–
Syracuse	2	1	1	0	.500	5	11	6	2	4	0	11	24
Union	4	2	2	0	.500	13	10	5	3	2	0	18	12
Williams	11	2	7	2	.273	11	22	13	4	7	2	18	24
Yale	15	14	1	0	.933	60	12	23	18	4	1	80	33
YMCA College	6	1	5	0	.167	6	39	7	2	5	0	11	39

== Schedule and results ==
Date	Opponent	Site	Result	Record
Regular Season
January 19	Middlebury*	RPI Rink • Troy, New York	W 2–0	1–0–0
January 26	YMCA College*	RPI Rink • Troy, New York	W 2–1	2–0–0
February 9	at Hamilton*	Russell Sage Rink • Clinton, New York	L 0–10	2–1–0
February 16	at Cornell*	Beebe Lake • Ithaca, New York	L 1–13	2–2–0
February 23	at Union*	Union Rink • Schenectady, New York (Rivalry)	L 0–7	2–3–0
*Non-conference game.
