= 1923–24 Amherst Lord Jeffs men's ice hockey season =

- Conference: Independent
- Home ice: Pratt Field

Record
- Overall: 5–5–1
- Home: 2–1–0
- Road: 3–1–0
- Neutral: 0–3–1

Coaches and captains
- Head coach: H. L. Davenport
- Captain: Albert Sylvester

The 1923–24 Amherst Lord Jeffs men's ice hockey season was the 11th season of play for the program. The Lord Jeffs were coached by H. L. Davenport in his 1st season.

== Season ==
With Leon Plumer, the unofficial head of the hockey program, having graduated, the school decided to bring in a coach to guide the team for the first time. H. L. Davenport was put in charge of a team that was already well arranged with many players returning from last year's team. As a bonus, Frank Hunter was now academically eligible and he rejoined the team for his senior season. The Lord Jeffs started the year by participating in a 4-team exhibition held in Lake Placid. The purple defense, led by Allison and Hunter, held up well but the offense had trouble getting on track. It was only in the final game that Amherst was able to score but that couldn't stop the team from returning without a win.

While the difficult preamble set the team back a bit, the Jeffmen were well sorted as a result and ready to take on Massachusetts Agricultural when they started the heart of their season. Poor conditions forced the game to be played on one of the campus ponds rather than the Aggie's rink and slowed down the match. Few shots were taken in the game as the puck would not behave due to the rough ice but the Purple still managed to get two into the Aggie cage. Titus' marker in the third proved to be the game-winner and got the Lord Jeff off and running. bad weather forced a match with Army to be cancelled but the time off didn't seem to hamper the purple in the least. In their first home game at the end of January, Amherst dispatched YMCA College with another round of solid defensive play.

That trend continued into February when the annual series with Williams was resumed. Looking for revenge for the loss in Lake Placid, Amherst came out flying and tried to overwhelm the Ephs. The home team didn't budge, however, and the two battled to a scoreless draw for two periods. 5 minutes into the third, Titus finally broke the tie and put the Jeffs in front. Williams got the tying goal with just two minutes to spare and the game was sent into overtime. Two 5-minute sessions were called for and passed without further effect. In the third 5-minute frame, Titus' second put Amherst in the lead while Sylveser sealed the win with his marker in the fourth overtime. The rematch a week later was a little less dramatic but no less successful for Amherst. Martin earned his third shutout of the season while a clean sheet of ice let Titus and Sylvester skate rings around the Ephs. The two scored a goal each en route to the Lord Jeff's fourth consecutive win.

The next game was shortened to 12-minute periods on account of weather but that didn't stop Amherst from swamping Union in the first two periods. After building a 4-goal lead, the team appeared to take the third off, which ended up costing Martin another shutout, but did not change the result. Amherst continued their jaunt through New York with a match against Hamilton. Unfortunately, the powerful Continentals proved too much for the purple and Martin surrendered 3 goals in a losing effort.

Hoping to end their season on a high note, the team returned more for the final game with the Aggies. The game was slow throughout and defense was the key feature of the match. The visitors scored the lone goal of the evening and prevented Amherst from posting its second consecutive winning season.

Lyall Merrill served as team manager with Frederick H. Tarr as his assistant.

== Roster ==
No.	Nat.	Player	Class	Pos	Height	Weight	DoB	Hometown	Previous team
	(United States)	Crosby Allison	Junior	D				Brooklyn, New York
	(United States)	Samuel M. Cameron	Sophomore	LW			1904-11-21	Greenfield, Massachusetts
	(United States)	Frank H. Hunter	Senior	D			1901-10-22	Wexford, Pennsylvania
	(United States)	Corydon Jones	Senior	D/C				Minneapolis, Minnesota
	(United States)	Joseph R. Kingman Jr.	Senior	LW			1900-06-08	Minneapolis, Minnesota
	(United States)	Donald Lawson	Junior	D				Brooklyn, New York
	(United States)	Norman Lawson	Freshman	RW				Brooklyn, New York
	(United States)	Harry B. Martin	Senior	G				Brooklyn, New York
	(United States)	Albert L. Sylvester Jr. (C)	Junior	RW			1903-05-06	Norwell, Massachusetts
	(United States)	George L. Titus	Junior	C			1903-01-30	Brooklyn, New York

== Standings ==
1923–24 Eastern Collegiate ice hockey standings
	Intercollegiate							Overall					
	GP	W	L	T	Pct.	GF	GA	GP	W	L	T	GF	GA
Amherst	11	5	5	1	.500	16	17	11	5	5	1	16	17
Army	6	3	3	0	.500	15	13	8	3	5	0	23	30
Bates	8	8	0	0	1.000	31	3	11	9	2	0	34	9
Boston College	1	1	0	0	1.000	6	3	18	7	10	1	32	45
Boston University	7	1	6	0	.143	10	34	9	1	8	0	11	42
Bowdoin	5	1	2	2	.400	10	17	6	1	3	2	10	24
Clarkson	4	1	3	0	.250	6	12	7	3	4	0	11	19
Colby	7	1	4	2	.286	9	18	8	1	5	2	11	21
Cornell	4	2	2	0	.500	22	11	4	2	2	0	22	11
Dartmouth	–	–	–	–	–	–	–	17	10	5	2	81	32
Hamilton	–	–	–	–	–	–	–	12	7	3	2	–	–
Harvard	9	6	3	0	.667	35	19	18	6	10	2	–	–
Maine	7	3	4	0	.429	20	18	12	4	8	0	33	60
Massachusetts Agricultural	8	2	6	0	.250	17	38	9	3	6	0	19	38
Middlebury	5	0	4	1	.100	2	10	7	0	6	1	3	16
MIT	4	0	4	0	.000	2	27	4	0	4	0	2	27
Pennsylvania	6	1	4	1	.250	6	23	8	1	5	2	8	28
Princeton	13	8	5	0	.615	35	20	18	12	6	0	63	28
Rensselaer	5	2	3	0	.400	5	31	5	2	3	0	5	31
Saint Michael's	–	–	–	–	–	–	–	–	–	–	–	–	–
Syracuse	2	1	1	0	.500	5	11	6	2	4	0	11	24
Union	4	2	2	0	.500	13	10	5	3	2	0	18	12
Williams	11	2	7	2	.273	11	22	13	4	7	2	18	24
Yale	15	14	1	0	.933	60	12	23	18	4	1	80	33
YMCA College	6	1	5	0	.167	6	39	7	2	5	0	11	39

== Schedule and results ==
Date	Opponent	Site	Result	Record
Regular Season
December 28	vs. Williams*	Lake Placid Rink • Lake Placid, New York	T 0–0 ^{2OT}	0–0–1
December 29	vs. Williams*	Lake Placid Rink • Lake Placid, New York	L 0–2	0–1–1
December 30	vs. Yale*	Lake Placid Rink • Lake Placid, New York	L 0–4	0–2–1
December 31	vs. Dartmouth*	Lake Placid Rink • Lake Placid, New York	L 2–4	0–3–1
January 15	at Massachusetts Agricultural*	Campus Pond • Amherst, Massachusetts	W 2–1	1–3–1
January 30	YMCA College*	Pratt Field Rink • Amherst, Massachusetts	W 2–0	2–3–1
February 7	at Williams*	Weston Field Rink • Williamstown, Massachusetts	W 3–1 ^{4OT}	3–3–1
February 13	Williams*	Pratt Field Rink • Amherst, Massachusetts	W 2–0	4–3–1
February 15	at Union*	Union Rink • Schenectady, New York	W 4–1	5–3–1
February 16	at Hamilton*	Russell Sage Rink • Clinton, New York	L 1–3	5–4–1
February 23	Massachusetts Agricultural*	Pratt Field Rink • Amherst, Massachusetts	L 0–1	5–5–1
*Non-conference game.
