= 1923–24 Penn Quakers men's ice hockey season =

- Home ice: Philadelphia Ice Palace

Record
- Overall: 1–5–2
- Home: 0–1–2
- Road: 1–3–0
- Neutral: 0–1–0

Coaches and captains
- Head coach: Eddie Powers
- Captain: Andy Pringle

The 1923–24 Penn Quakers men's ice hockey season was the 12th season of play for the program.

== Season ==
Penn's season began normally, with a slew of new players trying out for the squad. Despite much more practice time entering this season than the year before, coach Powers wasn't too optimistic about the team's first game and results bore that out. a 1–4 loss to began didn't harm the team too much as it was against an amateur team and wouldn't impair their collegiate ranking. After some lineup changes, the Quakers travelled up to West Point and won their first game despite very poor ice conditions. After a match with Lafayette was canceled, the spot was filled by a team composed of Princeton alumni who resided in and around Philadelphia. The game proved to be an even match and ended in a tie., which led the Quakers into their normal intercollegiate season with a .500 record.

The first big test for the team came against Yale and the Quakers were completely outmatched. Yale had several advantages in the game, including playing their 14th game of the season, but the biggest was how the Bulldogs used the closeness of the boards to the net and shot pucks off of the back wall and had them rebound out in front of the goal. Exams caused the team's next game to be played in early February and the time off didn't appear to help the squad. The next game, a few days later, also ended in a loss but the team nearly managed to overcome an early deficit and lead to some hope for the near future. The rematch with Hamilton happened at the end of the month and, despite Warner returning from a shoulder injury, the Quakers could only earn a tie with the Continentals. On a positive note, the game did attract 2,000 spectators so even in the midst of a poor season the team could still command a good-sized crowd.

The Quakers' season ended after a 1–5 loss to Dartmouth but worse news was soon to come. Due to financial constraints, the team was discontinued after the 1924 season and wouldn't play again for four years.

== Roster ==
No.	Nat.	Player	Class	Pos	Height	Weight	DoB	Hometown	Previous team
		Caminez		G
		Emmerling		RW
		Gray		RW
		Judd		LW
		MacGregor		D
		G. Murray		D
		Prince		LW
		Andrew C. Pringle (C)	Graduate	C
		Warner		D

== Standings ==
1923–24 Eastern Collegiate ice hockey standings
	Intercollegiate							Overall					
	GP	W	L	T	Pct.	GF	GA	GP	W	L	T	GF	GA
Amherst	11	5	5	1	.500	16	17	11	5	5	1	16	17
Army	6	3	3	0	.500	15	13	8	3	5	0	23	30
Bates	8	8	0	0	1.000	31	3	11	9	2	0	34	9
Boston College	1	1	0	0	1.000	6	3	18	7	10	1	32	45
Boston University	7	1	6	0	.143	10	34	9	1	8	0	11	42
Bowdoin	5	1	2	2	.400	10	17	6	1	3	2	10	24
Clarkson	4	1	3	0	.250	6	12	7	3	4	0	11	19
Colby	7	1	4	2	.286	9	18	8	1	5	2	11	21
Cornell	4	2	2	0	.500	22	11	4	2	2	0	22	11
Dartmouth	–	–	–	–	–	–	–	17	10	5	2	81	32
Hamilton	–	–	–	–	–	–	–	12	7	3	2	–	–
Harvard	9	6	3	0	.667	35	19	18	6	10	2	–	–
Maine	7	3	4	0	.429	20	18	12	4	8	0	33	60
Massachusetts Agricultural	8	2	6	0	.250	17	38	9	3	6	0	19	38
Middlebury	5	0	4	1	.100	2	10	7	0	6	1	3	16
MIT	4	0	4	0	.000	2	27	4	0	4	0	2	27
Pennsylvania	6	1	4	1	.250	6	23	8	1	5	2	8	28
Princeton	13	8	5	0	.615	35	20	18	12	6	0	63	28
Rensselaer	5	2	3	0	.400	5	31	5	2	3	0	5	31
Saint Michael's	–	–	–	–	–	–	–	–	–	–	–	–	–
Syracuse	2	1	1	0	.500	5	11	6	2	4	0	11	24
Union	4	2	2	0	.500	13	10	5	3	2	0	18	12
Williams	11	2	7	2	.273	11	22	13	4	7	2	18	24
Yale	15	14	1	0	.933	60	12	23	18	4	1	80	33
YMCA College	6	1	5	0	.167	6	39	7	2	5	0	11	39

== Schedule and results ==
Date	Opponent	Site	Result	Record
Regular Season
January 9	vs. Quaker City Club*	Philadelphia Ice Palace • Philadelphia, Pennsylvania	L 1–4	0–1–0
January 12	at Army*	Stuart Rink • West Point, New York	W 2–1	1–1–0
January 18	Princeton Alumni*	Philadelphia Ice Palace • Philadelphia, Pennsylvania	T 1–1	1–1–1
January 23	at Yale*	New Haven Arena • New Haven, Connecticut	L 0–8	1–2–1
February 8	at Cornell*	Beebe Lake • Ithaca, New York	L 1–6	1–3–1
February 11	at Hamilton*	Russell Sage Rink • Clinton, New York	L 2–3	1–4–1
February 26	Hamilton*	Philadelphia Ice Palace • Philadelphia, Pennsylvania	T 0–0	1–4–2
February 29	Dartmouth*	Philadelphia Ice Palace • Philadelphia, Pennsylvania	L 1–5	1–5–2
*Non-conference game.
