= 1923–24 Army Cadets men's ice hockey season =

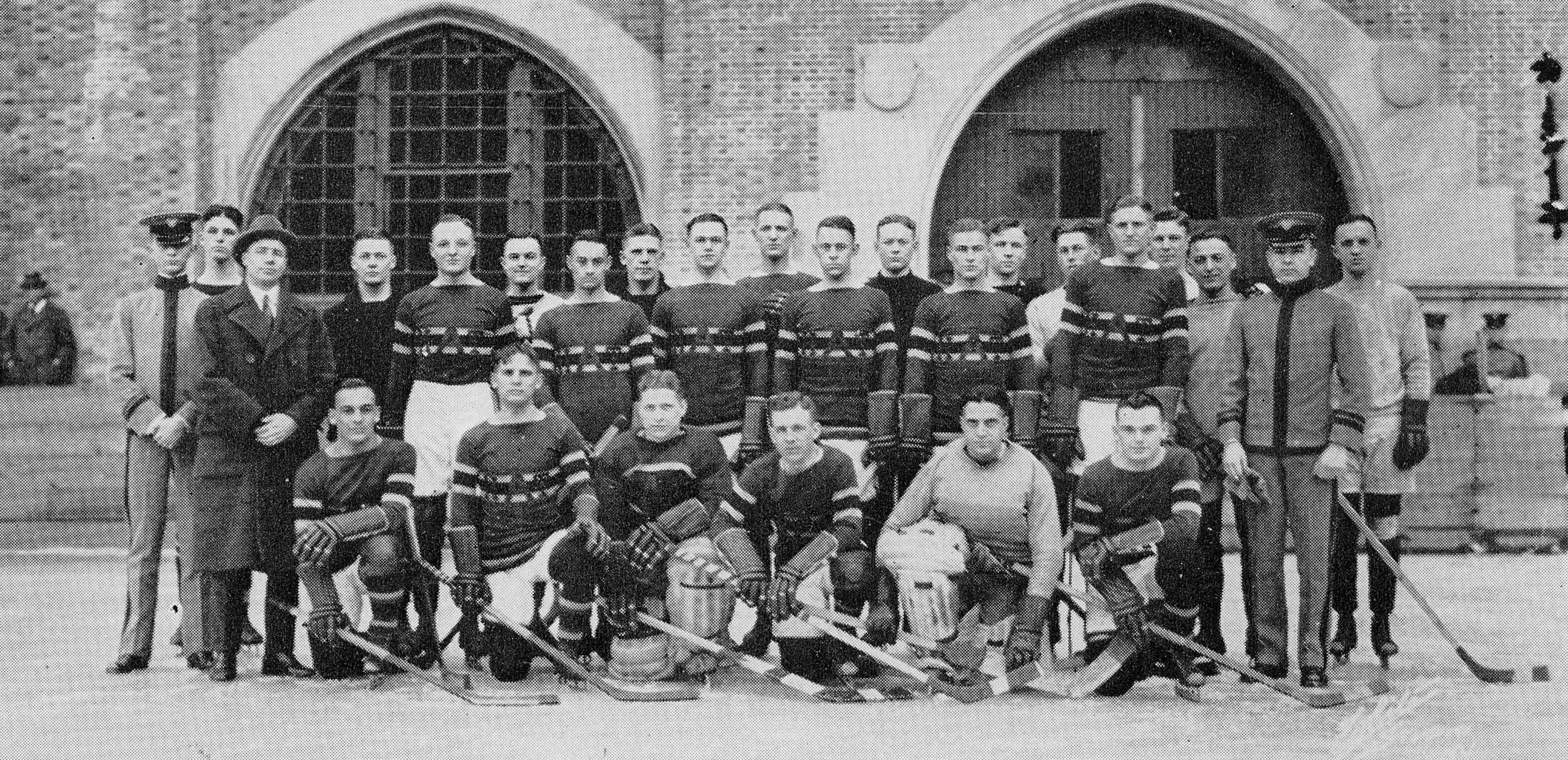
- Conference: Independent
- Home ice: Stuart Rink

Record
- Overall: 3–5–0
- Home: 3–5–0

Coaches and captains
- Head coach: Ray Marchand
- Captain: Lindsay Caywood

The 1923–24 Army Cadets men's ice hockey season was the 21st season of play for the program. The team was coached by Ray Marchand in his 1st season.

== Season ==
Army's hockey team began a tremendous change when Talbot Hunter was replaced by Ray Marchand as head coach. Their new bench boss overhauled the entire style of play for the Cadets and, while the new scheme would eventually pay dividends, the team was a little slow on the uptake. Part of the problem early in the year was the lack of ice resulting from a late winter. Army had just two partial practice sessions before their first game on January 5 and the resulting 3–7 loss was hardly surprising. Army fared much better in their second match, holding a 1–1 tie with Pennsylvania until the last minute of play. After the match with Penn, Stuart Rink was turned into little more than a puddle for a 10-day period and the Cadets were again unable to improve their play. The lack of ice time caused Army to drop their third game of the season to Bates which did not bode well for the remainder of the year.

After games against Amherst and Princeton were cancelled due to a lack of ice, February brought colder temperatures to West Point and Army was able to welcome MIT to Stuart Rink. Army played far better than they had in any of their previous games and dominated the Engineers despite the close score. A week later, a hat-trick by Walter Marinelli gave the Cadets a 3–2 win. Army ran its winning streak to 3 with a strong performance against Union but were then thoroughly beaten by their rivals to the north, the Royal Military College Paladins.

Entering their final weekend of the season, Army had a chance to earn a winning record. That possibility was ended, however, when Williams lost their goaltender Lowes before the match. Army's reserve netminder Lewis was put into the Ephs' cage and the two teams agreed to count the match as an exhibition. Army still had a chance to reach .500 but they would have to get through one of the nation's top teams in Boston College. Another hat-trick from Marinelli gave the Cadets a miraculous lead, which they carried late into the game, but BC managed to tie the score with just a few minutes to play. In the overtime session, the Bostonians overwhelmed Army and scored three times to capture the match and end the Cadets' season on a loss.

== Roster ==
No.	Nat.	Player	Class	Pos	Height	Weight	DoB	Hometown	Previous team
	(United States)	Willet J. Baird	Junior	D			1902-01-13	Cornwall-on-Hudson, New York
	(United States)	Lindsay P. Caywood (C)	Senior	RW			1900-02-19	Pittsburgh, Pennsylvania
	(United States)	Alvin A. Heidner	Sophomore	LW/RW			1904-10-14	North Dakota
	(United States)	Robert C. Lawes	Senior	D/RW			1899-07-06	Orange, New Jersey
	(United States)	Walter C. Marinelli	Senior	C				Calumet, Michigan
	(United States)	Raymond C. Maude	Sophomore	D/C			1902-07-01	Framingham, Massachusetts
	(United States)	James W. A. McNary	Senior	G			1899-11-23	Pittsburgh, Pennsylvania
	(United States)	Frederick F. Scheiffler	Sophomore	LW/RW			1904-04-15	Alpena, Michigan
	(United States)	Charles G. Stevenson Jr.	Senior	LW				Brooklyn, New York
	(United States)	Henry R. Westphalinger	Junior	D			1903-03-28	Saint Paul, Minnesota

== Standings ==
1923–24 Eastern Collegiate ice hockey standings
	Intercollegiate							Overall					
	GP	W	L	T	Pct.	GF	GA	GP	W	L	T	GF	GA
Amherst	11	5	5	1	.500	16	17	11	5	5	1	16	17
Army	6	3	3	0	.500	15	13	8	3	5	0	23	30
Bates	8	8	0	0	1.000	31	3	11	9	2	0	34	9
Boston College	1	1	0	0	1.000	6	3	18	7	10	1	32	45
Boston University	7	1	6	0	.143	10	34	9	1	8	0	11	42
Bowdoin	5	1	2	2	.400	10	17	6	1	3	2	10	24
Clarkson	4	1	3	0	.250	6	12	7	3	4	0	11	19
Colby	7	1	4	2	.286	9	18	8	1	5	2	11	21
Cornell	4	2	2	0	.500	22	11	4	2	2	0	22	11
Dartmouth	–	–	–	–	–	–	–	17	10	5	2	81	32
Hamilton	–	–	–	–	–	–	–	12	7	3	2	–	–
Harvard	9	6	3	0	.667	35	19	18	6	10	2	–	–
Maine	7	3	4	0	.429	20	18	12	4	8	0	33	60
Massachusetts Agricultural	8	2	6	0	.250	17	38	9	3	6	0	19	38
Middlebury	5	0	4	1	.100	2	10	7	0	6	1	3	16
MIT	4	0	4	0	.000	2	27	4	0	4	0	2	27
Pennsylvania	6	1	4	1	.250	6	23	8	1	5	2	8	28
Princeton	13	8	5	0	.615	35	20	18	12	6	0	63	28
Rensselaer	5	2	3	0	.400	5	31	5	2	3	0	5	31
Saint Michael's	–	–	–	–	–	–	–	–	–	–	–	–	–
Syracuse	2	1	1	0	.500	5	11	6	2	4	0	11	24
Union	4	2	2	0	.500	13	10	5	3	2	0	18	12
Williams	11	2	7	2	.273	11	22	13	4	7	2	18	24
Yale	15	14	1	0	.933	60	12	23	18	4	1	80	33
YMCA College	6	1	5	0	.167	6	39	7	2	5	0	11	39

== Schedule and results ==
Date	Opponent	Site	Result	Record
Regular Season
January 5	Royal Bank of Canada*	Stuart Rink • West Point, New York	L 3–7	0–1–0
January 12	Pennsylvania*	Stuart Rink • West Point, New York	L 1–2	0–2–0
January 23	Bates*	Stuart Rink • West Point, New York	L 0–1	0–3–0
February 2	MIT*	Stuart Rink • West Point, New York	W 2–0	1–3–0
February 9	Massachusetts Agricultural*	Stuart Rink • West Point, New York	W 3–2	2–3–0
February 13	Union*	Stuart Rink • West Point, New York	W 6–2	3–3–0
February 16	at Royal Military College*	Kingston, Ontario	L 5–10	3–4–0
February 22	Williams*	Stuart Rink • West Point, New York (Exhibition)	W 6–3	
February 23	Boston College*	Stuart Rink • West Point, New York	L 3–6 ^{OT}	3–5–0
*Non-conference game.
