= 1923–24 Williams Ephs men's ice hockey season =

College ice hockey team season

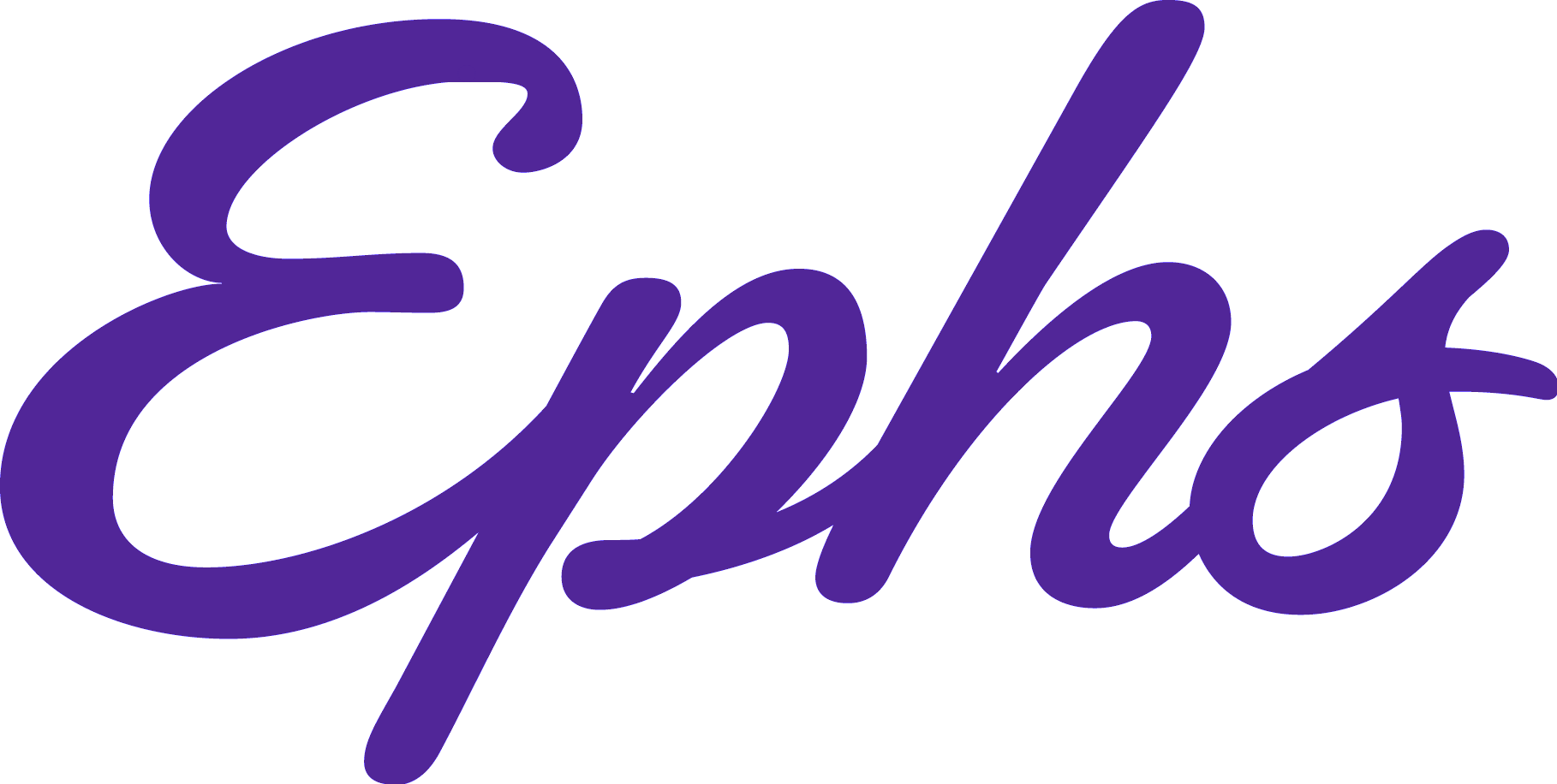
- Conference: Independent
- Home ice: Weston Field Rink

Record
- Overall: 4–7–2
- Home: 0–3–0
- Road: 1–2–1
- Neutral: 3–2–1

Coaches and captains
- Head coach: Ralph Cordingly
- Captain: John Stephenson

The 1923–24 Williams Ephs men's ice hockey season was the 21st season of play for the program.

== Season ==
Despite a successful season the year before, Williams had to replace the hockey team's coach with Ralph Cordingly. The team assembled in early December though, without any available ice, the candidates were forced to use the gymnasium for the tryouts. As the team was gearing up for their rapid-fire schedule at the end of December, some of the players attempted to get ice time on an individual basis at the rinks around Boston and New York but the first time the team would appear on the ice would be the opening match on Boxing Day.

From December 26 through January 1, the Williams ice hockey team played one game a day and came away with a surprisingly strong record. The first four-game took place at Lake Placid In the opening match against Dartmouth, neither team had been able to get much practice in ahead of time and the game was considerably slowed when the surface cracked and allowed water to seep up from below. Poor ice continued in the next two matches with Amherts, the first of which was also held in blizzard conditions. The teams played about as well as could be expected but after two overtimes and no goals to show for their efforts, the first match was called a draw. Williams finally got its first goals of the season in its third match and rode a second consecutive shutout from Lowes to its first win on the year. Despite playing so many games in such a short time, the Ephs looked better as their trip went along. Nowhere was this fact more evident than the match against Yale; the Bulldogs had been playing together since mid-November and were one of the best teams in the nation but were still only able to get a single goal past Lowes. While the offense wasn't able to conjure up a goal, the play of the team in the game demonstrated just how good the team could be if they had adequate facilities.

The team took an overnight train to Buffalo for a match on New Year's Eve but found that the local rink had been made unusable by a thaw. Frank Baird helped the team quickly gain the use of a rink at Port Colborne, about 25 miles away from Buffalo, and hastily played a game against a local aggregation. Though informal, it was the first game outside the United States in the history of the program. The following night the team played its scheduled game against the Nichols Club, a team made mostly of former college players. The defense remained a formidable asset for the team and helped them to their second win of the year.

Williams returned home after their hectic opening to the season and found that the weather had not been kind. The rink on Weston Field was still out of sorts and the team had to practice on Leake's Pond. They were able to eventually get some time in on the artificial rink but only briefly. The team was supposed to kick off its home slate with a game against Middlebury on January 12, however, that game was cancelled due to poor ice conditions. The first home game didn't come until the following week when YMCA College came to town, however, the layoff had not the team any favors. For the fourth time in six games, Williams was held without a goal and the Ephs wasted an outstanding performance from their goaltender. Soft, slushy ice and a late rain limited the game to just 30 minutes and slowing the players down but it was the defensive efforts of the visitors that prevented any Eph from finding the twine. Just 15 shots were attempted by the two teams combined but it was enough to hand Williams another loss. With the poor ice refusing to clear up, a match with Bates was postponed until the 22nd. When it finally was held, the team looked completely disorganized and fell 1–4. On an individual basis, the Purple players appeared to be better than their northern counterparts, however, the severe lack of practice left them playing as solitary figures rather than a team. Superior teamwork, particularly with regards to passing, led to the team's downfall. Captain Stephenson was moved back to defense in place of Pressprich while Popham assumed the role at left wing but that change didn't provide any tangible benefit. Stephenson's first goal of the season was the only marker Williams could manage and the team was forced back to the drawing board.

The exam break put the team on the sidelines for two weeks when what it really needed was practice, but that move was unavoidable. When the team did finally resume the season, they welcomed Amherst for the Ephs' final home match on the year. In the interim the team had been able to address some of their issues and coach Cordingly had inserted Pressprich at left wing. Both squads were evenly matched throughout the game but the Lord Jeffs held a narrow lead in the third and were trying to squeeze out a close win. Pressprich scored with just 2 minutes remaining to ruin those plans and forced the old foes into an overtime battle. The first two 5-minute periods ended with no additional goals so a second pair of overtimes was agreed upon. Tired out by the pace of the game, the Ephs' defense allowed two goals in the third and fourth overtimes and handed bragging rights, at least temporarily, to Amherst. The rematch happened a week later at Amherst with a freshman, Russ, being inserted at right wing while Stephenson and Pressprich were returned to their former position. Unfortunately, the team was still unable to get its offense going and was blanked yet again.

Williams travelled down to Connecticut for their second game of the year against Yale and were completely overwhelmed by the nation-leading Elis. Having learned from their previous game, the Bulldogs didn't take the Ephs lightly and assailed the Purple cage all game. Yale outshot Williams 18–64 using a bevy of substitutes in the game to keep their players fresh. In spite of the result, Williams played its best game in over a month and Lowes was hailed for his performance in goal as the score would have been much worse than 0–5 without him. The experience gained in recent weeks ended up paid dividends as the Ephs were finally able to get their offense going against the Mass Aggies. Stephenson had one of the most outstanding individual performances by scoring all 5 goals for his team but the credit for each marker needed to be shared with the rest of the team as each goal came as a result of a pass from behind the Aggies' goal.

A miscommunication between Williams and Army caused the next game to be played as an exhibition match. The managers for Williams had assumed the game would take place in the afternoon, as normal. With that in mind, Lowes made arrangements to arrive in West Point around noon. Army, however, had scheduled the match to take place at 10:30 A.M. and the contest would have been over by the time he arrived. Feeling that it would be unfair to ask Williams to play without its regular goal guard, Army offered not only to loan the Ephs their backup netminder but to also not count the game as an official match. The following day the team win in Morristown, New Jersey taking on a contingent of country club players. With Lowes in goal the Ephs easily defeated the golfers and then returned home to practice for their final matches of the year.

The Ephs headed out at the end of February to take on the Albany Country Club but the game was cancelled due to poor ice conditions. The following day the team met Hamilton and fought to a draw. Hamilton, having won 8 of their 10 games, was expected to win the match with relative ease but the Ephs were far better than their record would indicate. With a good ice surface, the Williams contingent was able to demonstrate just how fast it was and routinely broke away for rushes towards the Continental goal. Stephenson, Pressprich and Lowes were each playing their final college games and were vital in keeping Hamilton from scoring. Chase and Watkins provided the two Williams goals while the two teams went scoreless in overtime and ended with a respectable, if unsatisfying, end to their seasons.

Benjamin Fawcett served as team manager with Frank Gummey as his assistant.

== Roster ==
No.	Nat.	Player	Class	Pos	Height	Weight	DoB	Hometown	Previous team
	(United States)	Orville S. Chase	Freshman	C			1904-07-03	Geneva, New York
	(United States)	Henry W. Comstock	Junior	RW			1903-02-19	Buffalo, New York
	(United States)	Allen W. Fincke	Senior	D/RW			1902-03-12	Englewood, New Jersey
	(United States)	Lewis W. Francis Jr.	Junior	C				Brooklyn, New York
	(United States)	Charles L. Hibbard Jr.	Junior	D				Pittsfield, Massachusetts
	(United States)	Frederic W. Howe Jr.	Sophomore	D				Providence, Rhode Island
	(United States)	Marvin M. Lowes	Senior	G			1903-06-12	Flushing, New York
	(United States)	Robert M. Popham	Sophomore	C/LW/RW				New York, New York
	(United States)	Reginald W. Pressprich Jr.	Senior	D/LW			1902-08-05	Rochester, New York
	(United States)	John R. Russ	Freshman	RW				Newton Center, Massachusetts
	(United States)	Paul D. Shores	Senior	LW/RW			1901-05-12	Northampton, Massachusetts
	(United States)	Leonard H. Smith Jr.	Freshman				1904-02-03	Brooklyn, New York
	(United States)	John A. Stephenson Jr. (C)	Senior	D/F			1902-03-20	Duluth, Minnesota
	(United States)	Harry A. Watkins	Sophomore	C/LW			1904-02-07	South Orange, New Jersey

== Standings ==
1923–24 Eastern Collegiate ice hockey standings
	Intercollegiate							Overall					
	GP	W	L	T	Pct.	GF	GA	GP	W	L	T	GF	GA
Amherst	11	5	5	1	.500	16	17	11	5	5	1	16	17
Army	6	3	3	0	.500	15	13	8	3	5	0	23	30
Bates	8	8	0	0	1.000	31	3	11	9	2	0	34	9
Boston College	1	1	0	0	1.000	6	3	18	7	10	1	32	45
Boston University	7	1	6	0	.143	10	34	9	1	8	0	11	42
Bowdoin	5	1	2	2	.400	10	17	6	1	3	2	10	24
Clarkson	4	1	3	0	.250	6	12	7	3	4	0	11	19
Colby	7	1	4	2	.286	9	18	8	1	5	2	11	21
Cornell	4	2	2	0	.500	22	11	4	2	2	0	22	11
Dartmouth	–	–	–	–	–	–	–	17	10	5	2	81	32
Hamilton	–	–	–	–	–	–	–	12	7	3	2	–	–
Harvard	9	6	3	0	.667	35	19	18	6	10	2	–	–
Maine	7	3	4	0	.429	20	18	12	4	8	0	33	60
Massachusetts Agricultural	8	2	6	0	.250	17	38	9	3	6	0	19	38
Middlebury	5	0	4	1	.100	2	10	7	0	6	1	3	16
MIT	4	0	4	0	.000	2	27	4	0	4	0	2	27
Pennsylvania	6	1	4	1	.250	6	23	8	1	5	2	8	28
Princeton	13	8	5	0	.615	35	20	18	12	6	0	63	28
Rensselaer	5	2	3	0	.400	5	31	5	2	3	0	5	31
Saint Michael's	–	–	–	–	–	–	–	–	–	–	–	–	–
Syracuse	2	1	1	0	.500	5	11	6	2	4	0	11	24
Union	4	2	2	0	.500	13	10	5	3	2	0	18	12
Williams	11	2	7	2	.273	11	22	13	4	7	2	18	24
Yale	15	14	1	0	.933	60	12	23	18	4	1	80	33
YMCA College	6	1	5	0	.167	6	39	7	2	5	0	11	39

== Schedule and results ==
Date	Opponent	Site	Decision	Result	Record
Regular Season
December 27	vs. Dartmouth*	Lake Placid Rink • Lake Placid, New York	Lowes	L 0–3	0–1–0
December 28	vs. Amherst*	Lake Placid Rink • Lake Placid, New York	Lowes	T 0–0 ^{2OT}	0–1–1
December 29	vs. Amherst*	Lake Placid Rink • Lake Placid, New York	Lowes	W 2–0	1–1–1
December 30	vs. Yale*	Lake Placid Rink • Lake Placid, New York	Lowes	L 0–1	1–2–1
December 31	at Port Colborne*	Port Colborne, Ontario (Exhibition)	Lowes	W 3–1	
January 1	vs. Nichols Club*	Port Colborne, Ontario	Lowes	W 2–1	2–2–1
January 16	YMCA College*	Weston Field Rink • Williamstown, Massachusetts	Lowes	L 0–1	2–3–1
January 22	Bates*	Weston Field Rink • Williamstown, Massachusetts	Lowes	L 1–4	2–4–1
February 7	Amherst*	Weston Field Rink • Williamstown, Massachusetts	Lowes	L 1–3 ^{4OT}	2–5–1
February 13	at Amherst*	Pratt Field Rink • Amherst, Massachusetts	Lowes	L 0–2	2–6–1
February 16	at Yale*	New Haven Arena • New Haven, Connecticut	Lowes	L 0–5	2–7–1
February 19	at Massachusetts Agricultural*	Alumni Field Rink • Amherst, Massachusetts	Lowes	W 5–1	3–7–1
February 22	at Army*	Stuart Rink • West Point, New York (Exhibition)		L 3–6	
February 23	at Morris Country Coub*	Morristown, New Jersey	Lowes	W 5–1	4–7–1
March 1	at Hamilton*	Russell Sage Rink • Clinton, New York	Lowes	T 2–2 ^{2OT}	4–7–2
*Non-conference game.

== Scoring statistics ==
Name	Position	Games	Goals
John Stephenson	D/C/LW	13	7
Harry Watkins	C/LW	13	3
Henry Comstock	RW	13	2
Robert Popham	C/LW/RW	13	2
Orville Chase	C	3	1
Reginald Pressprich	D/LW	12	1
Frederic Howe	D	13	1
Leonard Smith	Substitute	1	0
Lewis Francis	C	1	0
John Russ	RW	4	0
Charles Hibbard	D	5	0
Paul Shores	LW/RW	6	0
Allen Finke	D/RW	11	0
Marvin Lowes	G	13	0
Total			17

Note: The first goal in the game against the Morris Country Club was deflected in off of a player's shin but neither the name nor team of that player was reported.
