= 1923–24 Union Skating Dutchmen ice hockey season =

- Conference: Independent
- Home ice: Union Rink

Record
- Overall: 3–2–0
- Home: 3–1–0
- Road: 0–1–0

Coaches and captains
- Head coach: Ambrose Clark
- Captain: William La Pan

The 1923–24 Union Skating Dutchmen men's ice hockey season was the 11th season of play for the program. The Skating Dutchmen represented Union College and were coached by Ambrose Clark in his 3rd season.

== Season ==
With the school's administration signing off on a limited travel budget for the team, the Skating Dutchmen were finally able to put together an intercollegiate schedule. Despite plans of starting the season early, however, warm weather caused the cancellation of the first game. The loss of that match did not put a damper on what turned out to be the season-opener as Middlebury arrived in town. The Rink was in decent condition for the match and the team had welcomed the addition of floodlight which had allowed the players to practice long after the sun set. The large size of the rink also enabled the game to me moved to a different section if one part was unsuitable for play. The inaugural intercollegiate match for the program turned out better than the Dutchmen could have hoped as Union downed Middlebury 3–0. Bishops pair was interrupted by one from Bates and Mattern earned the first official shutout since the end of the war.

The weather and exam break had the team on the shelf for most of the next month and they finally returned to play in mid-February. The team met the Schenectady Golf Club for a warm up match before returning to intercollegiate play and won their second game on the season on the strength of a solid defensive performance. The team travelled down to West Point for a match with Army and, at least early on, the Garnet held their own. Due to several players being ruled ineligible, three freshmen were inserted in the lineup. Union had difficulty handling Army's star forward, Marinelli, but team captain La Pan was able to tie the match in the second. Slattery, who had been pressed into service as a goaltender held up in the first two periods but the Dutch defense collapsed in the third. The team surrendered 4 goals to turn what had been an even game into a rout. The same lineup was used in the next game just a few days later and the team was about as successful against Amherst. Though the team was able to use substitutions for the home game, none of the additional players managed to help on the offensive side of the puck. Clifford scored the only goal in the loss to the Lord Jeffs and had the Dutchmen on the cusp of a losing season.

The final game of the season saw Union resume its rivalry with Rensselaer. The game quickly tilted in favor of the Dutchmen with Union displaying a much more cohesive brand of hockey. A hat-trick from Clifford was more than enough as Union won the match 7–0. Slattery earned the shoutout, perhaps becoming the only player to start the season as a forward and blank an opponent for an entire game.

== Roster ==
No.	Nat.	Player	Class	Pos	Height	Weight	DoB	Hometown	Previous team
		Bates Bishop		LW
		Storrs M. Bishop Jr.	Sophomore	D/F
		Cameron		LW
		Leslie P. Clifford	Freshman	C/RW
		John G. Gilmour	Freshman	RW
		Wells W. Grotta	Sophomore	RW			1902-04-19
		Dwinal C. Kerst	Sophomore	D
		William F. La Pan (C)		RW
	(United States)	Emmett C. Mattern	Sophomore	G			1903-06-06	Rush, New York
		Bruce A. Mulqueen	Freshman	D
		James T. Noye	Freshman	D
		Robinson		G/F
		Hugh J. Slattery	Sophomore	G/F
	(United States)	Nelson R. Zeitler	Sophomore	D			1902-12-02	Albany, New York

== Standings ==
1923–24 Eastern Collegiate ice hockey standings
	Intercollegiate							Overall					
	GP	W	L	T	Pct.	GF	GA	GP	W	L	T	GF	GA
Amherst	11	5	5	1	.500	16	17	11	5	5	1	16	17
Army	6	3	3	0	.500	15	13	8	3	5	0	23	30
Bates	8	8	0	0	1.000	31	3	11	9	2	0	34	9
Boston College	1	1	0	0	1.000	6	3	18	7	10	1	32	45
Boston University	7	1	6	0	.143	10	34	9	1	8	0	11	42
Bowdoin	5	1	2	2	.400	10	17	6	1	3	2	10	24
Clarkson	4	1	3	0	.250	6	12	7	3	4	0	11	19
Colby	7	1	4	2	.286	9	18	8	1	5	2	11	21
Cornell	4	2	2	0	.500	22	11	4	2	2	0	22	11
Dartmouth	–	–	–	–	–	–	–	17	10	5	2	81	32
Hamilton	–	–	–	–	–	–	–	12	7	3	2	–	–
Harvard	9	6	3	0	.667	35	19	18	6	10	2	–	–
Maine	7	3	4	0	.429	20	18	12	4	8	0	33	60
Massachusetts Agricultural	8	2	6	0	.250	17	38	9	3	6	0	19	38
Middlebury	5	0	4	1	.100	2	10	7	0	6	1	3	16
MIT	4	0	4	0	.000	2	27	4	0	4	0	2	27
Pennsylvania	6	1	4	1	.250	6	23	8	1	5	2	8	28
Princeton	13	8	5	0	.615	35	20	18	12	6	0	63	28
Rensselaer	5	2	3	0	.400	5	31	5	2	3	0	5	31
Saint Michael's	–	–	–	–	–	–	–	–	–	–	–	–	–
Syracuse	2	1	1	0	.500	5	11	6	2	4	0	11	24
Union	4	2	2	0	.500	13	10	5	3	2	0	18	12
Williams	11	2	7	2	.273	11	22	13	4	7	2	18	24
Yale	15	14	1	0	.933	60	12	23	18	4	1	80	33
YMCA College	6	1	5	0	.167	6	39	7	2	5	0	11	39

== Schedule and results ==
Date	Opponent	Site	Result	Record
Regular Season
January 18	Middlebury*	Union Rink • Schenectady, New York	W 3–0	1–0–0
February 9	Schenectady Golf Club*	Union Rink • Schenectady, New York	W 5–2	2–0–0
February 13	at Army*	Stuart Rink • West Point, New York	L 2–6	2–1–0
February 15	Amherst*	Union Rink • Schenectady, New York	L 1–4	2–2–0
February 23	Rensselaer*	Union Rink • Schenectady, New York (Rivalry)	W 7–0	3–2–0
*Non-conference game.
