= 1923–24 Middlebury Panthers men's ice hockey season =

- Conference: Independent
- Home ice: Middlebury Rink; Porter Pond

Record
- Overall: 0–6–1
- Home: 0–2–1
- Road: 0–3–0
- Neutral: 0–1–0

Coaches and captains
- Head coach: Erwin Drost
- Captain: Paris Fletcher

The 1923–24 Middlebury Panthers men's ice hockey season was the 2nd season of play for the program. The Panthers were coached by Erwin Drost in his 2nd season.

== Season ==
Despite the teams lack of success and minimal games played, the enthusiasm shown by the student body convinced the school to continue the ice hockey program. Most of the players were lost to graduation so the Panthers had to form essentially a brand new team. Erwin Drost, the coach of the freshman teams, returned and put the prospective players through their paces while a temporary rink was built atop the tennis courts near the chemistry building.

The first scheduled game was to be at Williams on January 12, however the match was cancelled due to poor ice. The extra week gave the team time to get in more practice time on Otter Creek and Porter Pond since the home rink had yet to become suitable for play. A week later the team took a trip to the capital district for a pair of games, finally opening their season against Union. Middlebury played well in the game but there was a distinct lack of teamwork that hamstrung their efforts to score. The following night went pretty much the same with Middlebury dropping a 0–2 decision to Rensselaer. After returning home, the team had several weeks before their next match, which would come after the exam break.

Early February saw the home rink finally in a usable state and provide the team with a much-needed playing surface. Unfortunately, the state of the ice was questionable and hampered the Panthers' performance. Many passing attempts were thwarted by rough ice and the same story played out when Clarkson arrived on the 8th. Despite showing a greater level of teamwork, Middlebury was shutout for the third consecutive game, though they gave the sizable home crowd something to cheer about with the pace of play. The match saw the return of McLaughlin to the lineup, which allowed Weekes to move up to wing and allow Fletcher to take over from Gonsalves at center. The next evening, the team was in Burlington to face Saint Michael's. Team captain Paris Fletcher scored the first goal of the season for the Panthers but it was not enough to carry the day. The Knights scored off a rebound in the waning moments of the match to take the contest 1–2.

A week later, the team faced off against Vermont on Porter Pond. Finnegan took over from Connelly in goal and performed well in the game. However, the Panthers' offense was still very weak despite ideal conditions for the game. Fletcher scored the only marker in the 1–3 loss. The team ended the season with back-to-back rematches against their in-state opponents. First, against Saint Michael's, the team had its best outing of the season, holding the Purples to just a single goal in the match. Leary managed the only tally for Middlebury to force a draw between the two. No overtime was played due to the visitors needing to catch a train. This was the first game in program history that did not end with the loss for the Panthers. The following day, in Burlington, the team was unable to avenge its earlier loss to Vermont and were blanked for the fourth time on the year. Despite the sorry state of the offense, the team continued to receive attention from the student body which was a good sign for the continued existence of the program.

Paris Fletcher served as team manager.

== Roster ==
| No. | Nat. | Player | Class | Pos | Height | Weight | DoB | Hometown | Previous team |
|---|---|---|---|---|---|---|---|---|---|
| | (United States) | John E. Connolly Jr. | Sophomore | G | | | | New York, New York |
| | (United States) | Joseph L. Finnegan | Freshman | G | | | 1901-11-10 | Cambridge, Massachusetts |
| | (United States) | Paris Fletcher (C) | Senior | C/LW | | | | Middlebury, Vermont |
| | (Portugal) | John H. Gonsalves | Sophomore | C | | | 1901-04-09 |
| | (United States) | John J. Leary | Junior | D | | | | Boston, Massachusetts |
| | (United States) | William J. McLaughlin | Sophomore | D | | | | Dorchester, Massachusetts |
| | (United States) | Edward S. Twitchell | Sophomore | RW | | | | New Britain, Connecticut |
| | (United States) | Donald F. Weekes | Senior | D/LW | | | 1901-02-07 | Lynn, Massachusetts |
| | (United States) | George W. Wilson | Junior | LW | | | | Springfield, Massachusetts |

== Standings ==
1923–24 Eastern Collegiate ice hockey standings
| | Intercollegiate | | | | | | | Overall | | | | | |
| | GP | W | L | T | Pct. | GF | GA | GP | W | L | T | GF | GA |
|---|---|---|---|---|---|---|---|---|---|---|---|---|---|
| Amherst | 11 | 5 | 5 | 1 | .500 | 16 | 17 | 11 | 5 | 5 | 1 | 16 | 17 |
| Army | 6 | 3 | 3 | 0 | .500 | 15 | 13 | 8 | 3 | 5 | 0 | 23 | 30 |
| Bates | 8 | 8 | 0 | 0 | 1.000 | 31 | 3 | 11 | 9 | 2 | 0 | 34 | 9 |
| Boston College | 1 | 1 | 0 | 0 | 1.000 | 6 | 3 | 18 | 7 | 10 | 1 | 32 | 45 |
| Boston University | 7 | 1 | 6 | 0 | .143 | 10 | 34 | 9 | 1 | 8 | 0 | 11 | 42 |
| Bowdoin | 5 | 1 | 2 | 2 | .400 | 10 | 17 | 6 | 1 | 3 | 2 | 10 | 24 |
| Clarkson | 4 | 1 | 3 | 0 | .250 | 6 | 12 | 7 | 3 | 4 | 0 | 11 | 19 |
| Colby | 7 | 1 | 4 | 2 | .286 | 9 | 18 | 8 | 1 | 5 | 2 | 11 | 21 |
| Cornell | 4 | 2 | 2 | 0 | .500 | 22 | 11 | 4 | 2 | 2 | 0 | 22 | 11 |
| Dartmouth | – | – | – | – | – | – | – | 17 | 10 | 5 | 2 | 81 | 32 |
| Hamilton | – | – | – | – | – | – | – | 12 | 7 | 3 | 2 | – | – |
| Harvard | 9 | 6 | 3 | 0 | .667 | 35 | 19 | 18 | 6 | 10 | 2 | – | – |
| Maine | 7 | 3 | 4 | 0 | .429 | 20 | 18 | 12 | 4 | 8 | 0 | 33 | 60 |
| Massachusetts Agricultural | 8 | 2 | 6 | 0 | .250 | 17 | 38 | 9 | 3 | 6 | 0 | 19 | 38 |
| Middlebury | 5 | 0 | 4 | 1 | .100 | 2 | 10 | 7 | 0 | 6 | 1 | 3 | 16 |
| MIT | 4 | 0 | 4 | 0 | .000 | 2 | 27 | 4 | 0 | 4 | 0 | 2 | 27 |
| Pennsylvania | 6 | 1 | 4 | 1 | .250 | 6 | 23 | 8 | 1 | 5 | 2 | 8 | 28 |
| Princeton | 13 | 8 | 5 | 0 | .615 | 35 | 20 | 18 | 12 | 6 | 0 | 63 | 28 |
| Rensselaer | 5 | 2 | 3 | 0 | .400 | 5 | 31 | 5 | 2 | 3 | 0 | 5 | 31 |
| Saint Michael's | – | – | – | – | – | – | – | – | – | – | – | – | – |
| Syracuse | 2 | 1 | 1 | 0 | .500 | 5 | 11 | 6 | 2 | 4 | 0 | 11 | 24 |
| Union | 4 | 2 | 2 | 0 | .500 | 13 | 10 | 5 | 3 | 2 | 0 | 18 | 12 |
| Williams | 11 | 2 | 7 | 2 | .273 | 11 | 22 | 13 | 4 | 7 | 2 | 18 | 24 |
| Yale | 15 | 14 | 1 | 0 | .933 | 60 | 12 | 23 | 18 | 4 | 1 | 80 | 33 |
| YMCA College | 6 | 1 | 5 | 0 | .167 | 6 | 39 | 7 | 2 | 5 | 0 | 11 | 39 |

== Schedule and results ==
| Date | Opponent | Site | Result | Record |
Regular Season
| January 18 | at Union* | Union Rink • Schenectady, New York | L 0–3 | 0–1–0 |
| January 19 | at Rensselaer* | RPI Rink • Troy, New York | L 0–2 | 0–2–0 |
| February 8 | Clarkson* | Middlebury Rink • Middlebury, Vermont | L 0–2 | 0–3–0 |
| February 9 | vs. Saint Michael's* | Centennial Rink • Burlington, Vermont | L 1–2 | 0–4–0 |
| February 16 | Vermont ^{†}* | Porter Pond • Middlebury, Vermont | L 1–3 | 0–5–0 |
| February 22 | Saint Michael's* | Porter Pond • Middlebury, Vermont | T 1–1 | 0–5–1 |
| February 23 | at Vermont ^{†}* | Centennial Rink • Burlington, Vermont | L 0–3 | 0–6–1 |
*Non-conference game.

† Vermont did not officially sanction ice hockey until 1926.

== Scoring statistics ==
| Name | Position | Games | Goals |
|---|---|---|---|
| Paris Fletcher | C/LW | - | 2 |
| John Leary | D | - | 1 |
| John Connelly | G | - | 0 |
| Joe Finnegan | G | - | 0 |
| John Gonsalves | C | - | 0 |
| William McLaughlin | D | - | 0 |
| Ed Twitchell | RW | - | 0 |
| Donald Weekes | D/LW | - | 0 |
| George Wilson | D | 1 | 0 |
| Total | | | 3 |
