= 1923–24 Boston University Terriers men's ice hockey season =

- Conference: Independent
- Home ice: Boston Arena

Record
- Overall: 1–8–0
- Home: 0–2–0
- Road: 0–4–0
- Neutral: 1–2–0

Coaches and captains
- Head coach: John O'Hare
- Captain(s): Joseph Almer; Morey Kontoff

The 1923–24 Boston University Terriers men's ice hockey season was the fourth season of play for the program. The Terriers were coached by John O'Hare in his second season.

== Season ==
For the second season after their return, BU was hoping to build on a solid performance in '23. The opening match early in the year made it appear that this may even be possible as the Terriers dropped MIT with a 7-goal performance. A week later BU met Harvard for the first of two games on the year. If the first period the two were evenly match and, though Harvard scored first, Blais knocked in an Almer rebound to even the count. However, Harvard was able to deploy an entirely new contingent of players in the second period and the fresh reserved rolled right over the Terrier defense. After three goals were scored in quick succession, Kelley replaced Hurteau in goal but that didn't stem the Crimson tide. Harvard got one more goal before the end of the period and then tacked on three more in the third to turn the match into an embarrassing route. The team's woes continued a few days later when a raw Princeton team arrived in town and easily dispatched BU.

Boston University had several weeks off before their next game and coach O'Hare was hoping that extended training sessions would hale to improve the team's offense. Unfortunately, the lack of scoring continued upon their return and the Terriers scored just one goal in their next game. The rematch with Harvard followed at the end of the month but, now without Almer, nothing seemed to be working for the Terriers. Harvard scored 5 goals in the first 20 minutes to take a commanding lead and, though the defense played much better in the second half, the forwards were unable to penetrate the Harvard defenses.

The Terriers hit the road in February, travelling up to Maine for a pair of matches at the beginning of the month. The dearth of scoring continued in a loss to the Association of St. Dominiques but the offense finally returned the following day. Maine opened a 2-goal lead after the first period before Kontoff and Provost combined to tie the game in the second. However, just as the Terriers were beginning to think that they may have a chance at a win, the Black Bears responded with two quick goals in the third to keep BU's losing streak alive.

The following week, BU headed south for a rematch with Princeton. The Tigers were coming off of their exam break and hadn't been on the ice in weeks but were still too much for the Terriers. Boston University was able to keep up with Princeton for the first 10 minutes but the defense faltered afterwards. The lack of reserves severely hampered the Terriers as Princeton used the same tactic that Harvard had employed by cycling through several lines of players to keep their skaters fresh. BU used only one alternate in the game and was outskated by the Tigers all evening. A few days later, the team's finale came against Yale but they didn't have any more luck then they had in New Jersey. The Bulldogs scored early and often, ending the first period with a 4-goal lead. Afterward, the team took a more casual approach to the game and only scored once in each of the succeeding periods. BU, however, was shutout for the fifth time on the year and ended the worst campaign in program history on a sour note.

== Roster ==
No.	Nat.	Player	Class	Pos	Height	Weight	DoB	Hometown	Previous team
		E. Joseph Almer (C)		F
		Arle Ashcraft		D/F
		Robert Blais		F
		Bradley
		Joe Brown		D
		Edmund Burke		D
		George Feldman		F
		Oscar Hurteau		G
		Peter Kelley		G
		Morris Kontoff (C)		D
		Roderick Ling		F
		McRae		F
		Stanfield Morrison
		Adolphus Provost		D/F
		Robertson
		William Wennerberg		F
		Whitman

== Standings ==
1923–24 Eastern Collegiate ice hockey standings
	Intercollegiate							Overall					
	GP	W	L	T	Pct.	GF	GA	GP	W	L	T	GF	GA
Amherst	11	5	5	1	.500	16	17	11	5	5	1	16	17
Army	6	3	3	0	.500	15	13	8	3	5	0	23	30
Bates	8	8	0	0	1.000	31	3	11	9	2	0	34	9
Boston College	1	1	0	0	1.000	6	3	18	7	10	1	32	45
Boston University	7	1	6	0	.143	10	34	9	1	8	0	11	42
Bowdoin	5	1	2	2	.400	10	17	6	1	3	2	10	24
Clarkson	4	1	3	0	.250	6	12	7	3	4	0	11	19
Colby	7	1	4	2	.286	9	18	8	1	5	2	11	21
Cornell	4	2	2	0	.500	22	11	4	2	2	0	22	11
Dartmouth	–	–	–	–	–	–	–	17	10	5	2	81	32
Hamilton	–	–	–	–	–	–	–	12	7	3	2	–	–
Harvard	9	6	3	0	.667	35	19	18	6	10	2	–	–
Maine	7	3	4	0	.429	20	18	12	4	8	0	33	60
Massachusetts Agricultural	8	2	6	0	.250	17	38	9	3	6	0	19	38
Middlebury	5	0	4	1	.100	2	10	7	0	6	1	3	16
MIT	4	0	4	0	.000	2	27	4	0	4	0	2	27
Pennsylvania	6	1	4	1	.250	6	23	8	1	5	2	8	28
Princeton	13	8	5	0	.615	35	20	18	12	6	0	63	28
Rensselaer	5	2	3	0	.400	5	31	5	2	3	0	5	31
Saint Michael's	–	–	–	–	–	–	–	–	–	–	–	–	–
Syracuse	2	1	1	0	.500	5	11	6	2	4	0	11	24
Union	4	2	2	0	.500	13	10	5	3	2	0	18	12
Williams	11	2	7	2	.273	11	22	13	4	7	2	18	24
Yale	15	14	1	0	.933	60	12	23	18	4	1	80	33
YMCA College	6	1	5	0	.167	6	39	7	2	5	0	11	39

== Schedule and results ==
Date	Opponent	Site	Result	Record
Regular Season
December 7	vs. MIT*	Boston Arena • Boston, Massachusetts	W 7–1	1–0–0
December 18	vs. Harvard*	Boston Arena • Boston, Massachusetts	L 1–8	1–1–0
December 21	Princeton*	Boston Arena • Boston, Massachusetts	L 0–4	1–2–0
January 16	Maple Athletic Association*	Boston Arena • Boston, Massachusetts	L 1–5	1–3–0
January 30	vs. Harvard*	Boston Arena • Boston, Massachusetts	L 0–5	1–4–0
February 1	at St. Dominiques*	Bartlett Street Rink • Lewiston, Maine	L 0–3	1–5–0
February 2	at Maine*	Alumni Field Rink • Orono, Maine	L 2–4	1–6–0
February 9	at Princeton*	Hobey Baker Memorial Rink • Princeton, New Jersey	L 0–6	1–7–0
February 13	at Yale*	New Haven Arena • New Haven, Connecticut	L 0–6	1–8–0
*Non-conference game.

== Scoring statistics ==
Name	Position	Games	Goals
Joseph Almer	C	-	4
Robert Blais	C/RW	-	4
George Feldman		1	0
Sanfield Morrison		1	0
Robertson		1	0
Whitman		1	0
Bradley		3	0
McRae	C/LW	4	0
Joe Brown	D	6	0
Oscar Hurteau	G	6	0
Edmund Burke	D	7	0
Arle Ashcraft	D/C/LW/RW	8	0
Peter Kelley	G	-	0
Morey Kontoff	D	-	-
Rod Ling	LW	-	-
Adolphus Provost	D/C	-	-
William Wennerberg	LW/RW	-	0
Total			11
