= 1923–24 Colby Mules men's ice hockey season =

- Conference: Independent
- Home ice: Colby Rink; South End Arena

Record
- Overall: 1–5–2
- Home: 1–1–1
- Road: 0–2–1
- Neutral: 0–2–0

Coaches and captains
- Head coach: Euclid Heile
- Captain: Grenville Vale

The 1923–24 Colby Mules men's ice hockey season was the 3rd season of play for the program. The Mules represented Colby College and were coached by Euclid Heile in his 1st season.

== Season ==
The outlook for Colby's third season were good at the start. The team was helmed by a new head coach but Professor Euclid Heile had earned his degreed in Canada and was more familiar with the game than his predecessors. Also, with the school now fully recognizing ice hockey as a minor sport, the college built an on-campus rink for the first time. Located at the north end of campus along the river bank, the rink was a massive sheet of ice, measuring more than 200 by 125 feet. Even with its size, the rink was ready for use by early January and twenty five men showed up for the initial practice.

The team had a few weeks to get ready for the opening match with Maine, however, when they arrived they were hesitant to play. The Bears' home rink was in a sorry state and coach Heile asked that the game be postponed or cancelled. Maine refused and insisted that the match could proceed, though they agreed to limit the game to three 10-minute periods. Colby had little choice but to play the game even though they were at a huge disadvantage. Already missing McBay on defense, Vale was struck in the mouth in the opening minutes and had to retire in order to get stitches. Without their captain, Colby couldn't hold off the Maine offense and swiftly found themselves behind. Fagerstrom did his best to keep the team in the game but without any scoring to speak of, the Mules were dead in the water. Three days later, the two met for a rematch in Waterville. Unfortunately, by that time the campus rink was in a similar state as Maine's and the match was moved to the South End Arena. On a relatively clean sheet of ice, Colby played far better in the rematch and it was only through the efforts of the visiting netminder that the score was not more lopsided. Vale and Millett were able to score in the second period and that was enough for Colby to even the series.

The team then had the rest of January off due to weather playing havoc with rinks throughout the region and did not return to the ice until after the exam break. The long wait also allowed the new rink be worked into shape and finally see some game action. Unfortunately, the Mules christened the ice with a loss. Colby played a fast game against Bates before several hundred spectators but they were unable to solve the brilliant goaltending of the Garnets. McGowan netted the only tally for the home team but it wasn't nearly enough to stave off defeat. A few days later, the team travelled to face the Association of St. Dominique's and put forth a far better effort. Vale netted two goals and gave the Mules a lead going into the final period, however, the home team was able to turn the tide and pull out a narrow victory in the end. The team continued its travels and visited Bowdoin the following day. Wore out from their close defeat, the team was slow off the mark against the Polar Bears and quickly found themselves down 0–3. McGowan scored twice in quick succession to get his team back in the contest before McBay tied the score with a shot from the neutral zone. The teams exchanged a pair of goals in the final period to force overtime, much to the chagrin of the exhausted Mules. Despite their fatigue, Colby managed to hold on through three 5-minte periods and earn a draw. Their final game of the week was a rematch with Bates at the Auburn Winter Carnival. The Mules were keen to get their revenge for the earlier loss and deny Bates the state championship. However, just like the earlier game, Colby found it night impossible to overcome the Garnet defense. Nothing that the Mules tried seemed to work and most of the rushes were turned aside before they even got to the net. After getting the best effort that the Blue and Gray could muster, which included moving McBay up to wing to get some extra speed on offense, Bates still proved victorious.

The final week of the season began with a third encounter with Bates. At the August Carnival, Colby desperately tried to get one over on the Garnet but the third time was not the charm for the Mules. Playing as well as they had in the previous match, Colby could not overcome the superior teamwork from Bates and Vale's lone goal was the only marker the team could conjure up. Fagerstrom gave a decent performance in goal but it was not enough and the Mules were bested for the third time, leaving no doubt as to which team was superior. Two days later, the team returned home for the rematch with Bowdoin. Fagerstrom was much better in the season finale, turning aside every Polar Bear shot in the first two periods and allowing just one on the night. Unfortunately, the offense gave their goaltender very little support and the only goal came from McGowan with just 90 seconds left in regulation. Colby was ready to play overtime, however, Bowdoin had to decline so that they could make the 6:28 train back to Brunswick. Colby had to accept the draw, leaving them with a three-way tie for second with both Maine and Bowdoin for the year.

Joseph P. Gorham served as team manager.

== Roster ==
No.	Nat.	Player	Class	Pos	Height	Weight	DoB	Hometown	Previous team
	(United States)	W. Elmer Fagerstrom	Sophomore	G				Worcester, Massachusetts
	(United States)	Louis R. McBay	Junior	D/RW				New Bedford, Massachusetts
	(United States)	John A. McGowan Jr.	Sophomore	LW			1902-04-11	Cambridge, Massachusetts
	(United States)	Carl R. MacPherson	Sophomore	D/RW			1904-04-09	Abington, Massachusetts
	(United States)	E. Willis Millett	Junior				1901-07-28	Whitman, Massachusetts
	(United States)	Harry Muir	Sophomore	LW				North Vassalboro, Maine
	(United States)	Richard J. Pike	Senior	D				Winthrop, Massachusetts
	(United States)	Albert H. Scott	Senior	D				Wilton, Maine
	(United States)	Grenville B. E. Vale	Senior	C				Glen Cove, New York

== Standings ==
1923–24 Eastern Collegiate ice hockey standings
	Intercollegiate							Overall					
	GP	W	L	T	Pct.	GF	GA	GP	W	L	T	GF	GA
Amherst	11	5	5	1	.500	16	17	11	5	5	1	16	17
Army	6	3	3	0	.500	15	13	8	3	5	0	23	30
Bates	8	8	0	0	1.000	31	3	11	9	2	0	34	9
Boston College	1	1	0	0	1.000	6	3	18	7	10	1	32	45
Boston University	7	1	6	0	.143	10	34	9	1	8	0	11	42
Bowdoin	5	1	2	2	.400	10	17	6	1	3	2	10	24
Clarkson	4	1	3	0	.250	6	12	7	3	4	0	11	19
Colby	7	1	4	2	.286	9	18	8	1	5	2	11	21
Cornell	4	2	2	0	.500	22	11	4	2	2	0	22	11
Dartmouth	–	–	–	–	–	–	–	17	10	5	2	81	32
Hamilton	–	–	–	–	–	–	–	12	7	3	2	–	–
Harvard	9	6	3	0	.667	35	19	18	6	10	2	–	–
Maine	7	3	4	0	.429	20	18	12	4	8	0	33	60
Massachusetts Agricultural	8	2	6	0	.250	17	38	9	3	6	0	19	38
Middlebury	5	0	4	1	.100	2	10	7	0	6	1	3	16
MIT	4	0	4	0	.000	2	27	4	0	4	0	2	27
Pennsylvania	6	1	4	1	.250	6	23	8	1	5	2	8	28
Princeton	13	8	5	0	.615	35	20	18	12	6	0	63	28
Rensselaer	5	2	3	0	.400	5	31	5	2	3	0	5	31
Saint Michael's	–	–	–	–	–	–	–	–	–	–	–	–	–
Syracuse	2	1	1	0	.500	5	11	6	2	4	0	11	24
Union	4	2	2	0	.500	13	10	5	3	2	0	18	12
Williams	11	2	7	2	.273	11	22	13	4	7	2	18	24
Yale	15	14	1	0	.933	60	12	23	18	4	1	80	33
YMCA College	6	1	5	0	.167	6	39	7	2	5	0	11	39

== Schedule and results ==
Date	Opponent	Site	Decision	Result	Record
Regular Season
January 16	at Maine*	Alumni Field Rink • Orono, Maine	Fagerstrom	L 0–3	0–1–0
January 19	Maine*	South End Arena • Waterville, Maine	Fagerstrom	W 2–1	1–1–0
February 9	Bates*	Colby Rink • Waterville, Maine	Fagerstrom	L 1–5	1–2–0
February 12	at St. Dominique's*	Bartlett Street Rink • Lewiston, Maine	Fagerstrom	L 2–3	1–3–0
February 13	at Bowdoin*	Delta Rink • Brunswick, Maine	Fagerstrom	T 4–4 ^{3OT}	1–3–1
February 15	vs. Bates*	Auburn Rink • Auburn, Maine	Fagerstrom	L 0–2	1–4–1
February 23	vs. Bates*	Augusta, Maine	Fagerstrom	L 1–2	1–5–1
February 25	Bowdoin*	Colby Rink • Waterville, Maine	Fagerstrom	T 1–1	1–5–2
*Non-conference game.

Note: Colby's yearbook has incorrect dates for most of the games.

== Scoring statistics ==
Name	Position	Games	Goals
Gren Vale	C	8	5
John McGowan	LW	8	4
Louis McBay	D/RW	7	1
Bill Millett	D	8	1
Albert Scott	D	1	0
Carl MacPherson	D/RW	3	0
Richard Pike	D	5	0
Harry Muir	RW	7	0
Elmer Fagerstrom	G	8	0
Total			11
