= 1923–24 Maine Black Bears men's ice hockey season =

- Conference: Independent
- Home ice: Alumni Field Rink

Record
- Overall: 4–8–0
- Home: 4–1–0
- Road: 0–7–0

Coaches and captains
- Head coach: Stanley Wallace
- Captain: Wilmer Elliot

The 1923–24 Maine Black Bears men's ice hockey season was the 2nd season of play for the program. The Black Bears represented the University of Maine and were coached by Stanley Wallace in his 1st season.

== Season ==
For Maine's second season of varsity hockey, the team had a new head coach in Stanley Wallace. However, with several veterans returning, there was at last a solid foundation for the team. The campaign did not have an auspicious start, with the Braes losing 4–12 to the Association of St. Dominique's, but the game did serve as a wake-up call for the program.

When the team hit the ice for a home-and-home series with Colby in the middle of January, the Bears looked far better than they had in their first match. The offense had a good start to the game, with Stone and Stover combining for three goals, but it was the defense that dominated all evening. Baxter made several brilliant saves throughout the contest kept the Mules off the scoresheet for the entire game. The rematch saw Baxter again as the standout player for the Black bears, however, the effort from the rest of the team was a little lacking. Maine only got 7 shots on goal for the game and, while Stover scored his second of the season, it wasn't enough to avoid defeat. The team ended its January schedule with a solid effort against the Brownville Hockey Club, making up for their poor performance in the season opener.

After the exam break, the team resumed its season with a match against Boston University. Drew Stearns was back in the lineup as a starter and made up for lost time by scoring twice against the Terriers. Stone and Elliott added markers of their own to get the team back above .500. The team then began a stretch of four games in eleven days, all against in-state college with all being included for the state championship. First up was Bates and the Bears had to not only fight through the opposition but also a consistent snowfall and a headwind for much of the game. Very little went right for Maine as the team got down early and struggled to put together any kind of offense. Baxter was the only reason the final score wasn't worse but the 0–4 loss was bad enough.

Two days later, the team got their chance at redemption against Bowdoin. The Black Bears thoroughly dominated the match but that was due as much to the poor teamwork of the Polar bears as it was to the quality of the home team. Stearns and Stover were all over the ice but it was Elliott who led the scoring with the program's first 5-goal game. In the rematch with Bates, the Black Bears still had an outside chance at a state championship but the Garnet swiftly dashed Maine's hope. The Black Bears were blanked for the second time by Bates with the score closer than the play on the ice would demand. Maine didn't get any attack going until the third period, after the result was all but decided. In the finale with Bowdoin, the Black Bears was assaulted by a barrage of shots by the home team and failed to weather the storm. The Polar Bears netted three goals in the first period to take a commanding lead and Maine was unable to respond. Stearns scored the only goal for the Black Bears and ended their intercollegiate schedule with a disappointing defeat.

At the end of February, the team travelled north into Canada to take on three amateur clubs. Predictably, the college team did not fare well in the three games against much older and more experienced men. However, despite the outcome, the team received plaudits from the onlookers who were impressed that the Black Bears didn't look too out of place on the ice.

After the season, there was a push for the school to reclassify the program as a major sport. Though most who were against this proposal wanted ice hockey to remain a minor sport, the university ended up deciding to scrap the program entirely. The primary reason for this was that the school believed that without a permanent, indoor facility, the team was too susceptible to weather conditions and would be too expensive to run compared to other sports. The veterans of the '24 team gathered together the following winter to try and convince the administration to chance their minds but to no avail. It would take more than 50 years for varsity hockey to return to Orono.

J. Theodore Sckofield served as team manager with Arthur Parmenter and Arthur Pendleton as his assistants.

== Roster ==
No.	Nat.	Player	Class	Pos	Height	Weight	DoB	Hometown	Previous team
	(United States)	Charles L. Baxter	Sophomore	G				Rockland, Massachusetts
	(United States)	James T. Blair	Junior	D				Medford, Massachusetts
	(United States)	C. Michael Dowd	Sophomore	D			1903-04-05	Worcester, Massachusetts
	(United States)	Wilmer R. Elliott (C)	Junior	C			1903-06-21	Patten, Maine
	(United States)	Roger D. Mackay	Sophomore	D				Dorchester, Massachusetts
	(United States)	Drew T. Stearns	Senior	LW			1899-08-11	Hebron, Maine
	(United States)	Roger B. Stone	Sophomore	LW/RW			1901-11-11	Swampscott, Massachusetts
	(United States)	Clyde N. Stover	Sophomore	LW/RW			1903-03-06	York Beach, Maine
	(United States)	William H. True Jr.	Sophomore	LW				Roxbury, Massachusetts

== Standings ==
1923–24 Eastern Collegiate ice hockey standings
	Intercollegiate							Overall					
	GP	W	L	T	Pct.	GF	GA	GP	W	L	T	GF	GA
Amherst	11	5	5	1	.500	16	17	11	5	5	1	16	17
Army	6	3	3	0	.500	15	13	8	3	5	0	23	30
Bates	8	8	0	0	1.000	31	3	11	9	2	0	34	9
Boston College	1	1	0	0	1.000	6	3	18	7	10	1	32	45
Boston University	7	1	6	0	.143	10	34	9	1	8	0	11	42
Bowdoin	5	1	2	2	.400	10	17	6	1	3	2	10	24
Clarkson	4	1	3	0	.250	6	12	7	3	4	0	11	19
Colby	7	1	4	2	.286	9	18	8	1	5	2	11	21
Cornell	4	2	2	0	.500	22	11	4	2	2	0	22	11
Dartmouth	–	–	–	–	–	–	–	17	10	5	2	81	32
Hamilton	–	–	–	–	–	–	–	12	7	3	2	–	–
Harvard	9	6	3	0	.667	35	19	18	6	10	2	–	–
Maine	7	3	4	0	.429	20	18	12	4	8	0	33	60
Massachusetts Agricultural	8	2	6	0	.250	17	38	9	3	6	0	19	38
Middlebury	5	0	4	1	.100	2	10	7	0	6	1	3	16
MIT	4	0	4	0	.000	2	27	4	0	4	0	2	27
Pennsylvania	6	1	4	1	.250	6	23	8	1	5	2	8	28
Princeton	13	8	5	0	.615	35	20	18	12	6	0	63	28
Rensselaer	5	2	3	0	.400	5	31	5	2	3	0	5	31
Saint Michael's	–	–	–	–	–	–	–	–	–	–	–	–	–
Syracuse	2	1	1	0	.500	5	11	6	2	4	0	11	24
Union	4	2	2	0	.500	13	10	5	3	2	0	18	12
Williams	11	2	7	2	.273	11	22	13	4	7	2	18	24
Yale	15	14	1	0	.933	60	12	23	18	4	1	80	33
YMCA College	6	1	5	0	.167	6	39	7	2	5	0	11	39

== Schedule and results ==
Date	Opponent	Site	Result	Record
Regular Season
January 9	at St. Dominique's*	Bartlett Street Rink • Lewiston, Maine	L 4–12	0–1–0
January 16	Colby*	Alumni Field Rink • Orono, Maine	W 3–0	1–1–0
January 19	at Colby*	South End Arena • Waterville, Maine	L 1–2	1–2–0
January 24	Brownville Hockey Club*	Alumni Field Rink • Orono, Maine	W 6–1	2–2–0
February 2	Boston University*	Alumni Field Rink • Orono, Maine	W 4–2	3–2–0
February 6	at Bates*	Lake Andrews Rink • Lewiston, Maine	L 0–4	3–3–0
February 8	Bowdoin*	Alumni Field Rink • Orono, Maine	W 6–1	4–3–0
February 13	Bates*	Alumni Field Rink • Orono, Maine	L 0–5	4–4–0
February 16	at Bowdoin*	Delta Rink • Brunswick, Maine	L 1–4	4–5–0
February 21	at Fredericton Athletic Club*	Fredericton, New Brunswick	L 3–14	4–6–0
February 22	at St. John's Athletic Club*	Saint John, New Brunswick	L 1–7	4–7–0
February 23	at St. Stephens Athletic Club*	Saint John, New Brunswick	L 4–8	4–8–0
*Non-conference game.
