= 1923–24 Clarkson Golden Knights men's ice hockey season =

Intercollegiate hockey season

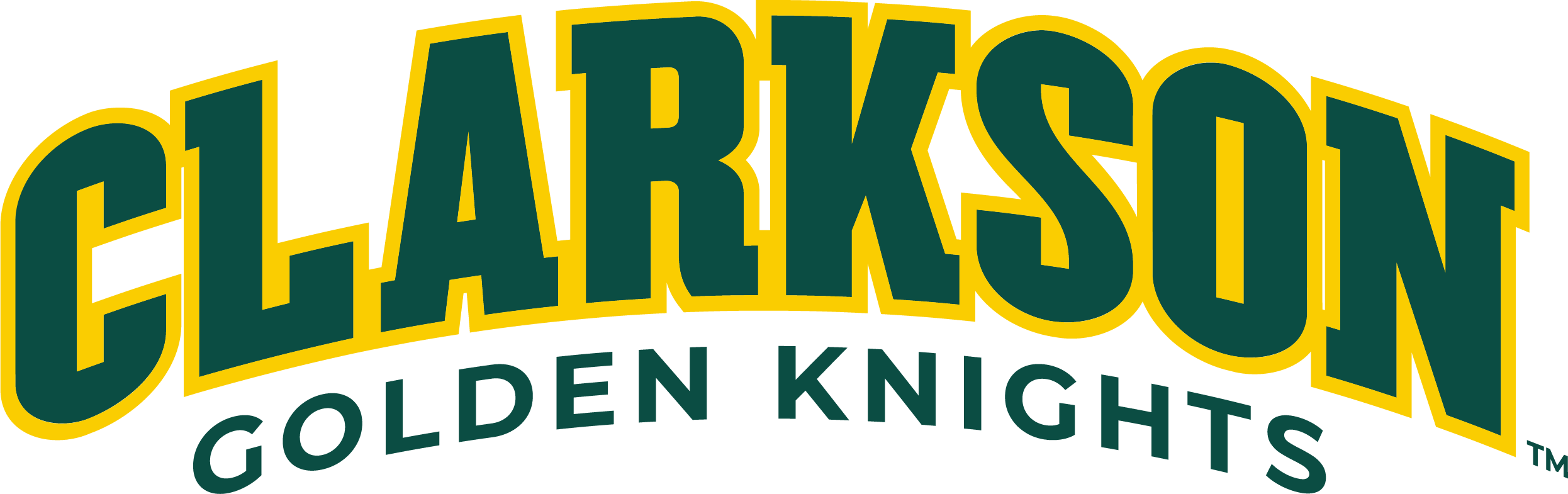
- Home ice: Clarkson Rink

Record
- Overall: 3–4–0
- Home: 1–2–0
- Road: 2–2–0

Coaches and captains
- Head coach: Gordon Croskery
- Captain: Cyril Fenn

The 1923–24 Clarkson Golden Knights men's ice hockey season was the 4th season of play for the program. The team was coached by Gordon Croskery in his first season.

== Season ==
Entering its fourth year, Clarkson's ice hockey team were now without the services of three-year captain Bill Johnson. Two events demonstrated that the team would be able to survive after his graduation, however; a temporary rink was built next to Main Street so that the players could both practice and play on consistent ice, and the team secured the services of a coach to help improve their game. Gordon Croskery, an assistant professor of Engineering at the school and a World War I veteran, was a Canadian who had grown up with the game and would be able to teach some of the finer points to the players. While he technically wasn't the team's coach, he is typically regarded as the program's first bench boss.

Clarkson's season began with a game against Hamilton and the loss of Johnson's offensive touch was felt in their 0–5 loss. The team's defence shut down Ogdensburg in the next game, winning 1–0 in overtime. After losing the next two games, Clarkson earned two more shutouts on the year, defeating a pair of Vermont colleges before the Green Mountain State got its revenge with Saint Michael's handing Tech their fourth loss of the year in double overtime.

Russell Sanford served as team manager with Roland Fitch as an assistant.

== Roster ==
No.	Nat.	Player	Class	Pos	Height	Weight	DoB	Hometown	Previous team
	(United States)	Beverly Bond	Senior	F				Buffalo, New York
	(Canada)	Jack Croskery	Freshman	D				Kinburn, Ontario
	(United States)	Cyril Fenn (C)	Senior	F				New York, New York
	(United States)	Everett Ginn	Junior	G				Rensselaer Falls, New York
	(United States)	Samuel LaFontaine	Junior	D				Champlain, New York
	(United States)	Bill Macartney	Freshman	F				Fort Covington, New York
	(United States)	Joseph Mercer	Junior	F				Malone, New York
	(United States)	Lloyd Northup	Freshman	F				Alexandria Bay, New York

== Standings ==
1923–24 Eastern Collegiate ice hockey standings
	Intercollegiate							Overall					
	GP	W	L	T	Pct.	GF	GA	GP	W	L	T	GF	GA
Amherst	11	5	5	1	.500	16	17	11	5	5	1	16	17
Army	6	3	3	0	.500	15	13	8	3	5	0	23	30
Bates	8	8	0	0	1.000	31	3	11	9	2	0	34	9
Boston College	1	1	0	0	1.000	6	3	18	7	10	1	32	45
Boston University	7	1	6	0	.143	10	34	9	1	8	0	11	42
Bowdoin	5	1	2	2	.400	10	17	6	1	3	2	10	24
Clarkson	4	1	3	0	.250	6	12	7	3	4	0	11	19
Colby	7	1	4	2	.286	9	18	8	1	5	2	11	21
Cornell	4	2	2	0	.500	22	11	4	2	2	0	22	11
Dartmouth	–	–	–	–	–	–	–	17	10	5	2	81	32
Hamilton	–	–	–	–	–	–	–	12	7	3	2	–	–
Harvard	9	6	3	0	.667	35	19	18	6	10	2	–	–
Maine	7	3	4	0	.429	20	18	12	4	8	0	33	60
Massachusetts Agricultural	8	2	6	0	.250	17	38	9	3	6	0	19	38
Middlebury	5	0	4	1	.100	2	10	7	0	6	1	3	16
MIT	4	0	4	0	.000	2	27	4	0	4	0	2	27
Pennsylvania	6	1	4	1	.250	6	23	8	1	5	2	8	28
Princeton	13	8	5	0	.615	35	20	18	12	6	0	63	28
Rensselaer	5	2	3	0	.400	5	31	5	2	3	0	5	31
Saint Michael's	–	–	–	–	–	–	–	–	–	–	–	–	–
Syracuse	2	1	1	0	.500	5	11	6	2	4	0	11	24
Union	4	2	2	0	.500	13	10	5	3	2	0	18	12
Williams	11	2	7	2	.273	11	22	13	4	7	2	18	24
Yale	15	14	1	0	.933	60	12	23	18	4	1	80	33
YMCA College	6	1	5	0	.167	6	39	7	2	5	0	11	39

== Schedule and results ==
Date	Opponent	Site	Result	Record
Regular season
January 19	at Hamilton*	Russell Sage Rink • Clinton, New York	L 0–5	0–1–0
January 26	Ogdensburg*	Clarkson Rink • Potsdam, New York	W 1–0 ^{OT}	1–1–0
February 2	Syracuse*	Clarkson Rink • Potsdam, New York	L 2–4	1–2–0
February 5	at Massena A. C.*	Massena, New York	L 1–7	1–3–0
February 8	at Middlebury*	Middlebury, Vermont	W 2–0	2–3–0
February 9	at Vermont ^{†}*	Burlington, Vermont	W 3–0	3–3–0
February 16	Saint Michael's*	Clarkson Rink • Potsdam, New York	L 2–3 ^{2OT}	3–4–0
*Non-conference game.

† Vermont did not field a varsity team at this time.
