= 1923–24 Syracuse Orangemen ice hockey season =

- Conference: Independent

Record
- Overall: 1–3–0

Coaches and captains
- Head coach: Hugh Keenleyside; Laurie D. Cox
- Captain: Lawrence Reed

The 1923–24 Syracuse Orangemen ice hockey season was the 3rd season of play for the program. The Orangemen represented Syracuse University and were coached by Professor Hugh Keenleyside.

== Season ==
At the beginning of the school year, Syracuse had no intention of fielding an ice hockey team. However, thanks to the efforts of Hugh Keenleyside, a Canadian professor at the college, he was able to convince enough students to band together and form a club. After a little prodding, the university gave the program its blessing and allowed varsity ice hockey to return for the first time in over a decade. The Orangemen hastily put together a slate of game but, due to the lateness of their start, only a few matches were against fellow colleges.

The team had a good start to its season, winning their first two games. Unfortunately, the trajectory of the year swiftly changed and the Orangemen lost the final four games that they played. The team was aided by Laurie D. Cox, the coach of the lacrosse team.

Stanley Mahon served as team manager.

== Roster ==
No.	Nat.	Player	Class	Pos	Height	Weight	DoB	Hometown	Previous team
	(United States)	Everett M. Carhart	Junior					Syracuse, New York
	(United States)	William T. Davison	Junior					Syracuse, New York
	(United States)	Bernard P. Kopkind	Sophomore				1905-01-03	New Haven, Connecticut
		Nordblom
	(United States)	Ernest R. Park	Senior					Syracuse, New York
	(United States)	Lawrence E. Reed (C)	Sophomore					Buffalo, New York
	(United States)	Benjamin A. Snow	Sophomore				1904-09-18	Cambridge, Massachusetts

== Standings ==
1923–24 Eastern Collegiate ice hockey standings
	Intercollegiate							Overall					
	GP	W	L	T	Pct.	GF	GA	GP	W	L	T	GF	GA
Amherst	11	5	5	1	.500	16	17	11	5	5	1	16	17
Army	6	3	3	0	.500	15	13	8	3	5	0	23	30
Bates	8	8	0	0	1.000	31	3	11	9	2	0	34	9
Boston College	1	1	0	0	1.000	6	3	18	7	10	1	32	45
Boston University	7	1	6	0	.143	10	34	9	1	8	0	11	42
Bowdoin	5	1	2	2	.400	10	17	6	1	3	2	10	24
Clarkson	4	1	3	0	.250	6	12	7	3	4	0	11	19
Colby	7	1	4	2	.286	9	18	8	1	5	2	11	21
Cornell	4	2	2	0	.500	22	11	4	2	2	0	22	11
Dartmouth	–	–	–	–	–	–	–	17	10	5	2	81	32
Hamilton	–	–	–	–	–	–	–	12	7	3	2	–	–
Harvard	9	6	3	0	.667	35	19	18	6	10	2	–	–
Maine	7	3	4	0	.429	20	18	12	4	8	0	33	60
Massachusetts Agricultural	8	2	6	0	.250	17	38	9	3	6	0	19	38
Middlebury	5	0	4	1	.100	2	10	7	0	6	1	3	16
MIT	4	0	4	0	.000	2	27	4	0	4	0	2	27
Pennsylvania	6	1	4	1	.250	6	23	8	1	5	2	8	28
Princeton	13	8	5	0	.615	35	20	18	12	6	0	63	28
Rensselaer	5	2	3	0	.400	5	31	5	2	3	0	5	31
Saint Michael's	–	–	–	–	–	–	–	–	–	–	–	–	–
Syracuse	2	1	1	0	.500	5	11	6	2	4	0	11	24
Union	4	2	2	0	.500	13	10	5	3	2	0	18	12
Williams	11	2	7	2	.273	11	22	13	4	7	2	18	24
Yale	15	14	1	0	.933	60	12	23	18	4	1	80	33
YMCA College	6	1	5	0	.167	6	39	7	2	5	0	11	39

== Schedule and results ==
Date	Opponent	Site	Result	Record
Regular Season
?	Sedgwick Farms*	?	W 5–3	1–0–0
February 2	at Clarkson*	Clarkson Rink • Potsdam, New York	W 4–2	2–0–0
?	Canadian Hockey Club*	?	L 0–4	2–1–0
?	Hamilton*	?	L 1–9	2–2–0
?	Sedgwick Farms*	?	L 0–3	2–3–0
?	Brockville Wanderers*	?	L 1–3	2–4–0
*Non-conference game.
