= 1923–24 Cornell Big Red men's ice hockey season =

Intercollegiate hockey season

- Home ice: Beebe Lake

Record
- Overall: 2–2–0
- Home: 2–0–0
- Road: 0–2–0

Coaches and captains
- Head coach: Nick Bawlf
- Captain: Frank Tone

The 1923–24 Cornell Big Red men's ice hockey season was the 19th season of play for the program. The teams was coached by Nick Bawlf in his 4th season.

== Season ==
After a terrible season, Cornell's chance to improve itself was delayed due to a lack of ice and the team didn't play its first practice until January 7. The late start caused the team to compress its schedule to play 5 or 6 games, but that was reduced when the first game against Buffalo was cancelled. Even though the team could practice on Beebe Lake, soft ice and rain made playing the game impossible. This was the first game that the team had to cancel since returning after World War I. The weather got so bad that the second schedule match, a week later, also had to be cancelled.

While the start to their season couldn't have been worse, Cornell knew that weather wouldn't cancel their third game as they were to travel to Princeton. Predictably, the delayed start caused the team to come out flat against the Tigers and the Big Red lost their opening game 0–5. Stainton played well in net, however, stopping 36 shots and kept Cornell in the match until the 3rd period. By the time of their next scheduled game, Beebe Lake had frozen enough to be usable and the Big Red were finally able to play a home game. Coach Bawlf changed up his offense by swapping in Tilton at center with Burnett and started Kidd at left wing. The changes seemed to work as Cornell dominated a good Penn team to earn their first win in almost 2 years. The Big Red scored as many goals in the game as they had the entire previous year.

The veritable offensive deluge continued in the next match when Cornell throttled Renssealer 13–1. The team tied the program record for goals in a game and gave hope that, despite facing Yale, the Big Red may be able to finish the season with a winning record. To that point, Yale had gone 11–0 against fellow varsity clubs and hadn't allowed a goal over their previous four games. Despite playing at the Bulldogs's home arena, Cornell gave the Elis a tough test. Yale jumped out to a 2–0 lead after the first period but Tilton cut their advantage in half at the start of the second. From then on the team traded goals with the Big Red coming with a goal of tying the score on three separate occasions, but they could never find the equalizer and Yale escaped with a victory.

== Roster ==
| No. | Nat. | Player | Class | Pos | Height | Weight | DoB | Hometown | Previous team |
|---|---|---|---|---|---|---|---|---|---|
| | (United States) | Richard Aronson | Sophomore | LW | | | | Winthrop, Massachusetts |
| | | Edward D. Betts | Senior | LW |
| | (United States) | Newton C. Burnett | Junior | C/RW | | | | Newton, Massachusetts |
| | (United States) | Robert P. B. Kidd | Sophomore | LW | | | | Tivoli, New York |
| | | John G. Nesbett | Senior | D |
| | (United States) | J. Ainsworth Rane | Sophomore | LW | | | | Durham, New Hampshire |
| | (United States) | Charles M. Stainton | Junior | G | | | | Buffalo, New York |
| | (United States) | Benjamin E. Tilton Jr. | Sophomore | C/RW | | | | Washington D. C. |
| | (United States) | Frank J. Tone Jr. (C) | Senior | D | | | 1901-03-30 | Niagara Falls, New York |
| | | Rollin H. White Jr. | Sophomore | D |

== Standings ==
1923–24 Eastern Collegiate ice hockey standings
| | Intercollegiate | | | | | | | Overall | | | | | |
| | GP | W | L | T | Pct. | GF | GA | GP | W | L | T | GF | GA |
|---|---|---|---|---|---|---|---|---|---|---|---|---|---|
| Amherst | 11 | 5 | 5 | 1 | .500 | 16 | 17 | 11 | 5 | 5 | 1 | 16 | 17 |
| Army | 6 | 3 | 3 | 0 | .500 | 15 | 13 | 8 | 3 | 5 | 0 | 23 | 30 |
| Bates | 8 | 8 | 0 | 0 | 1.000 | 31 | 3 | 11 | 9 | 2 | 0 | 34 | 9 |
| Boston College | 1 | 1 | 0 | 0 | 1.000 | 6 | 3 | 18 | 7 | 10 | 1 | 32 | 45 |
| Boston University | 7 | 1 | 6 | 0 | .143 | 10 | 34 | 9 | 1 | 8 | 0 | 11 | 42 |
| Bowdoin | 5 | 1 | 2 | 2 | .400 | 10 | 17 | 6 | 1 | 3 | 2 | 10 | 24 |
| Clarkson | 4 | 1 | 3 | 0 | .250 | 6 | 12 | 7 | 3 | 4 | 0 | 11 | 19 |
| Colby | 7 | 1 | 4 | 2 | .286 | 9 | 18 | 8 | 1 | 5 | 2 | 11 | 21 |
| Cornell | 4 | 2 | 2 | 0 | .500 | 22 | 11 | 4 | 2 | 2 | 0 | 22 | 11 |
| Dartmouth | – | – | – | – | – | – | – | 17 | 10 | 5 | 2 | 81 | 32 |
| Hamilton | – | – | – | – | – | – | – | 12 | 7 | 3 | 2 | – | – |
| Harvard | 9 | 6 | 3 | 0 | .667 | 35 | 19 | 18 | 6 | 10 | 2 | – | – |
| Maine | 7 | 3 | 4 | 0 | .429 | 20 | 18 | 12 | 4 | 8 | 0 | 33 | 60 |
| Massachusetts Agricultural | 8 | 2 | 6 | 0 | .250 | 17 | 38 | 9 | 3 | 6 | 0 | 19 | 38 |
| Middlebury | 5 | 0 | 4 | 1 | .100 | 2 | 10 | 7 | 0 | 6 | 1 | 3 | 16 |
| MIT | 4 | 0 | 4 | 0 | .000 | 2 | 27 | 4 | 0 | 4 | 0 | 2 | 27 |
| Pennsylvania | 6 | 1 | 4 | 1 | .250 | 6 | 23 | 8 | 1 | 5 | 2 | 8 | 28 |
| Princeton | 13 | 8 | 5 | 0 | .615 | 35 | 20 | 18 | 12 | 6 | 0 | 63 | 28 |
| Rensselaer | 5 | 2 | 3 | 0 | .400 | 5 | 31 | 5 | 2 | 3 | 0 | 5 | 31 |
| Saint Michael's | – | – | – | – | – | – | – | – | – | – | – | – | – |
| Syracuse | 2 | 1 | 1 | 0 | .500 | 5 | 11 | 6 | 2 | 4 | 0 | 11 | 24 |
| Union | 4 | 2 | 2 | 0 | .500 | 13 | 10 | 5 | 3 | 2 | 0 | 18 | 12 |
| Williams | 11 | 2 | 7 | 2 | .273 | 11 | 22 | 13 | 4 | 7 | 2 | 18 | 24 |
| Yale | 15 | 14 | 1 | 0 | .933 | 60 | 12 | 23 | 18 | 4 | 1 | 80 | 33 |
| YMCA College | 6 | 1 | 5 | 0 | .167 | 6 | 39 | 7 | 2 | 5 | 0 | 11 | 39 |

== Schedule and results ==
| Date | Opponent | Site | Result | Record |
Regular season
| January 26 | at Princeton* | Hobey Baker Memorial Rink • Princeton, New Jersey | L 0–5 | 0–1–0 |
| February 8 | Pennsylvania* | Beebe Lake • Ithaca, New York | W 6–1 | 1–1–0 |
| February 16 | Rensselaer* | Beebe Lake • Ithaca, New York | W 13–1 | 2–1–0 |
| February 19 | at Yale* | New Haven Arena • New Haven, Connecticut | L 3–4 | 2–2–0 |
*Non-conference game.
