= 1923–24 YMCA College Maroons men's ice hockey season =

- Conference: Independent

Record
- Overall: 2–5–0
- Road: 2–5–0

Coaches and captains
- Captain: Bud Granger

The 1923–24 YMCA College Maroons men's ice hockey season was the 19th season of play for the program.

== Season ==
After losing an entire season, the ice hockey program attempted a comeback in 1924. The team was organized by the students without the benefit of a head coach but they did receive the blessing of the school for an official team. Unfortunately, the college decided against building a temporary rink on Pratt Field and the team was forced to find other accommodations.

The initial game of the year was supposed to be played against Rensselaer, however, warm weather forced that game to be postponed. Instead, the team travelled to take on Williams for the opening match. The ice was in very poor condition with slush and water littering its surface. passing and stickhandling were nigh impossible which actually helped the Maroons as the team had hardly been able to train on an ice surface prior to the contest. The team slogged over the soft ice and managed to fend off the Ephs for the entire match. In the second, a long-distance shot from Witherall found its way into the net and was the only score of the game. The succeeding match with Cornell was cancelled and the team instead took on the local amateur hockey club. The Maroons were by far the better of the two and got goals from all three forwards in the game.

With the surprising start to the season, it appeared that YMCA might be able to produce a fine campaign. The team next had the makeup game with RPI and were expected to win since the Engineers were still one of the worst programs in college hockey. Unfortunately, the team found a blizzard waiting for them in Troy and found it very difficult to play in the adverse conditions. Hamm was able to score in the middle frame but that wasn' enough to overcome Rensselaer. The following week the team travelled to take on Amherst and got into another close battle with the Sabrinas. When the dust settles the team was one goal short and the loss dropped them back to an even record. While the team didn't know it at the time, the next game would mark a turning point of the season. A week later the team was back in Amherst, this time to take on the Mass Aggies. On poor ice, the teams started out with a scoreless first period. The second saw the Aggies' captain hit in the eye by a stick and sent to the hospital. The irate Agates took over the game and crushed the Maroons in the second half of the match, scoring 4 goals in the second and then adding another 3 in the third.

Still reeling from their third consecutive loss, the team headed up to New Hampshire to take on one of the top teams in the nation and Dartmouth showed no sympathy to the Maroons. The Indians hammered YMCA 0–15, inflicting the worst defeat for the program in nineteen years. Without any usable ice, the team could not fix any of its problems afterwards. 10 days later, the team was embarrassed again, this time to the tune of 1–12 by Hamilton. The final game on the schedule, March 1 at Army, was cancelled due to bad weather.

The collapse of the team at the end, coupled with the lack of a rink for the program, convinced the school to suspend the program once more and it would be nearly three years before the team played its next game.

M. M. Swartz served as team manager.

== Roster ==
No.	Nat.	Player	Class	Pos	Height	Weight	DoB	Hometown	Previous team
	(United States)	Edward E. Bond	Sophomore	D				Dover, Massachusetts
	(United States)	George L. Chesley	Junior	G				Concord, New Hampshire
	(United States)	Lancelot Fowler	Sophomore	G				Whitinsville, Massachusetts
	(United States)	Walter A. Granger (C)	Senior	D				East Lynn, Massachusetts
	(United States)	William A. Hamm	Senior	RW				Bridgeport, Connecticut
	(United States)	Ronald B. Morgan	Sophomore	D				Russell, Kentucky
		A. Weatherall		LW
		C. White		C

== Standings ==
1923–24 Eastern Collegiate ice hockey standings
	Intercollegiate							Overall					
	GP	W	L	T	Pct.	GF	GA	GP	W	L	T	GF	GA
Amherst	11	5	5	1	.500	16	17	11	5	5	1	16	17
Army	6	3	3	0	.500	15	13	8	3	5	0	23	30
Bates	8	8	0	0	1.000	31	3	11	9	2	0	34	9
Boston College	1	1	0	0	1.000	6	3	18	7	10	1	32	45
Boston University	7	1	6	0	.143	10	34	9	1	8	0	11	42
Bowdoin	5	1	2	2	.400	10	17	6	1	3	2	10	24
Clarkson	4	1	3	0	.250	6	12	7	3	4	0	11	19
Colby	7	1	4	2	.286	9	18	8	1	5	2	11	21
Cornell	4	2	2	0	.500	22	11	4	2	2	0	22	11
Dartmouth	–	–	–	–	–	–	–	17	10	5	2	81	32
Hamilton	–	–	–	–	–	–	–	12	7	3	2	–	–
Harvard	9	6	3	0	.667	35	19	18	6	10	2	–	–
Maine	7	3	4	0	.429	20	18	12	4	8	0	33	60
Massachusetts Agricultural	8	2	6	0	.250	17	38	9	3	6	0	19	38
Middlebury	5	0	4	1	.100	2	10	7	0	6	1	3	16
MIT	4	0	4	0	.000	2	27	4	0	4	0	2	27
Pennsylvania	6	1	4	1	.250	6	23	8	1	5	2	8	28
Princeton	13	8	5	0	.615	35	20	18	12	6	0	63	28
Rensselaer	5	2	3	0	.400	5	31	5	2	3	0	5	31
Saint Michael's	–	–	–	–	–	–	–	–	–	–	–	–	–
Syracuse	2	1	1	0	.500	5	11	6	2	4	0	11	24
Union	4	2	2	0	.500	13	10	5	3	2	0	18	12
Williams	11	2	7	2	.273	11	22	13	4	7	2	18	24
Yale	15	14	1	0	.933	60	12	23	18	4	1	80	33
YMCA College	6	1	5	0	.167	6	39	7	2	5	0	11	39

== Schedule and results ==
Date	Opponent	Site	Result	Record
Regular Season
January 16	at Williams*	Weston Field Rink • Williamstown, Massachusetts	W 1–0	1–0–0
January 19	at Springfield Hockey Club*	Eastern States Coliseum • Springfield, Massachusetts	W 5–0	2–0–0
January 26	at Rensselaer*	RPI Rink • Troy, New York	L 1–2	2–1–0
February 1	at Amherst*	Pratt Field Rink • Amherst, Massachusetts	L 2–3	2–2–0
February 7	at Massachusetts Agricultural*	Alumni Field Rink • Amherst, Massachusetts	L 1–7	2–3–0
February 13	at Dartmouth*	Occom Pond • Hanover, New Hampshire	L 0–15	2–4–0
February 23	at Hamilton*	Russell Sage Rink • Clinton, New York	L 1–12	2–5–0
*Non-conference game.
