= 1923–24 Bates men's ice hockey season =

Intercollegiate hockey season

- Conference: Independent
- Home ice: Lake Andrews

Record
- Overall: 9–2–0
- Home: 2–2–0
- Road: 5–0–0
- Neutral: 2–0–0

Coaches and captains
- Head coach: Carleton Wiggin
- Captain: Dick Stanley

The 1923–24 Bates men's ice hockey season was the 5th season of play for the program.

== Season ==
After claiming the state championship the previous year, coach Wiggin was hoping for an bigger profile for the ice hockey team. Unfortunately, at the first meeting of the season, only about 20 men bothered to show up. Wiggin implored any among the student body with skating experience to show up to further practices but, due to a lack of ice before the winter break, all early-season training was done inside the campus gymnasium. Despite the difficulties, many former players were available for the Garnet and the team was well sorted by the time the season began. They opened with a practice game against Jordan High School who, unfortunately, did not have a goaltender on hand. Dave Wyllie agreed to sub into the goal for the opposition and had his hands busy in the match.

The first official game for the team happened a few days later when they faced the Association of St. Dominique's. The amateur squad played a fast, physical game but the teamwork and passing employed by Bates helped them carry the day. Cogan's two goals were the only markers in the game and the defense kept Wyllie from seeing too much action. At the end of the week, Bates welcomed Bowdoin to town for a resumption of the annual rivalry. The fast, experienced Garnet were leagues ahead of their black and white foes and took the opening match 7–0. Due to the prowess of the Stanleys and Scott on the blueline, hardly any scoring opportunities made it to the Bates cage and whatever did get through was easily turned aside by Wyllie. Cogan's 5 goals in the game were a sign if things to come and of particular import as Leonardi had missed the game with an illness.

After that strong start, the team travelled south to take on Williams but they ran into a problem. The ice on the Weston Field Rink was too soft so the teams decided to wait until the following day in the hopes of better conditions. Luckily, the rink was serviceable by the next afternoon and the Garnet were able to display their typical effective play. Following the win over the Ephs, Bates met Army for their toughest test of the season. Not only was Army a well-disciplined team, but their ice surface was in poor condition, leaving Bates to battle two different opponents in the match. While the offense wasn't suited to the slog, the Garnet defense was as strong as it had been in earlier games. Bates produced its third shutout in four games while Red Scott score the only goal of the game. Just before the exam break, Bates played a rematch with St. Dominique's and the two were evenly matched throughout. Cogan was the only one to score for Bates, however, Wyllie kept his team in the game and forced overtime. After 11 minutes, the winning tally came from A.S.D. and was the first blemish on the year for the Garnet.

When the team reconvened after exams, they did so without defensive stalwart Red Scott. The captain of the football team had graduated in the interim and was no longer eligible to play, leaving the team to contend with the loss in experience and talent. Maine was next up for the Garnet and they were expecting a hard fight after two close games the year before. Wyllie, however, had other ideas and continued his rare form in goal. The netminder recorded his 4th shutout of the season while the offense did its part. The inspired play continued the next week when Bates dropped both Colby and Maine to all but guarantee themselves another state championship. Cogan had another 5-goal game by scoring every marker against the Mules but could 'only' manage a hat-trick in the rematch with the Orono squad. Wyllie's 5th shutout on the year also set a program record.

The rematch with Colby would decide the state championship and both teams showed up to play. The game was much more physical than the earlier meeting but the Garnet netminder was impenetrable once more. Even with poor lighting for the rink, Cogan scored the first goal for Bates and that was all the team needed for the victory. O'Connor's first goal of the season capped off the game and left the team undefeated in intercollegiate play. In the final week of the season, Bates met St. Dominique's for the rubber match to decide the season series between the two. Unfortunately, without Red Scott on hand, the Garnet were unable to hold off the fast aggregation and fell 0–4. The final game came at the Augusta Winter Sports Carnival and they faced Colby for the third time that year. Just like the previous two occurrences, Bates came away as the victor with Cogan leading the scoring charge. The victory left Bates with not only an undefeated season in intercollegiate play, but also allowed them to take home the Governor Baxter trophy as the state champions in ice hockey.

Clarence Gilpatric served as team manager.

Note: Bates did not adopt the 'Bobcats' moniker until 1924.

== Roster ==
No.	Nat.	Player	Class	Pos	Height	Weight	DoB	Hometown	Previous team
	(United States)	Donald P. Bryant	Freshman	D/F			1903-09-06	Lewiston, Maine
	(United States)	Joseph W. Cogan	Senior	C			1902-01-01	Stoneham, Massachusetts
	(United States)	Ralph L. Corey	Junior	LW/RW			1898-05-10	Springvale, Maine
	(United States)	Almon G. Lane Jr.	Freshman	C/LW			1905-07-12	Lewiston, Maine
		Arthur A. Leonardi	Sophomore	LW
	(United States)	John F. O'Connor	Junior	LW/RW			1901-13-01	Dorchester, Massachusetts
	(United States)	Arthur B. Scott	Senior	D			1900-02-26	South Boston, Massachusetts
		John P. Stanley Jr.	Sophomore	D/LW
	(United States)	Richard J. Stanley (C)	Senior	D			1902-08-20	Lewiston, Maine
	(United States)	David Wyllie	Sophomore	G			1904-07-11	Whitneyville, Connecticut

== Standings ==
1923–24 Eastern Collegiate ice hockey standings
	Intercollegiate							Overall					
	GP	W	L	T	Pct.	GF	GA	GP	W	L	T	GF	GA
Amherst	11	5	5	1	.500	16	17	11	5	5	1	16	17
Army	6	3	3	0	.500	15	13	8	3	5	0	23	30
Bates	8	8	0	0	1.000	31	3	11	9	2	0	34	9
Boston College	1	1	0	0	1.000	6	3	18	7	10	1	32	45
Boston University	7	1	6	0	.143	10	34	9	1	8	0	11	42
Bowdoin	5	1	2	2	.400	10	17	6	1	3	2	10	24
Clarkson	4	1	3	0	.250	6	12	7	3	4	0	11	19
Colby	7	1	4	2	.286	9	18	8	1	5	2	11	21
Cornell	4	2	2	0	.500	22	11	4	2	2	0	22	11
Dartmouth	–	–	–	–	–	–	–	17	10	5	2	81	32
Hamilton	–	–	–	–	–	–	–	12	7	3	2	–	–
Harvard	9	6	3	0	.667	35	19	18	6	10	2	–	–
Maine	7	3	4	0	.429	20	18	12	4	8	0	33	60
Massachusetts Agricultural	8	2	6	0	.250	17	38	9	3	6	0	19	38
Middlebury	5	0	4	1	.100	2	10	7	0	6	1	3	16
MIT	4	0	4	0	.000	2	27	4	0	4	0	2	27
Pennsylvania	6	1	4	1	.250	6	23	8	1	5	2	8	28
Princeton	13	8	5	0	.615	35	20	18	12	6	0	63	28
Rensselaer	5	2	3	0	.400	5	31	5	2	3	0	5	31
Saint Michael's	–	–	–	–	–	–	–	–	–	–	–	–	–
Syracuse	2	1	1	0	.500	5	11	6	2	4	0	11	24
Union	4	2	2	0	.500	13	10	5	3	2	0	18	12
Williams	11	2	7	2	.273	11	22	13	4	7	2	18	24
Yale	15	14	1	0	.933	60	12	23	18	4	1	80	33
YMCA College	6	1	5	0	.167	6	39	7	2	5	0	11	39

== Schedule and results ==
Date	Opponent	Site	Result	Record
Exhibition
January 8	Jordan High School*	Lake Andrews Rink • Lewiston, Maine (Exhibition)	W 8–0	
Regular Season
January 10	at St. Dominique's*	Bartlett Street Rink • Lewiston, Maine	W 2–0	1–0–0
January 15	Bowdoin*	Lake Andrews Rink • Lewiston, Maine	W 7–0	2–0–0
January 22	at Williams*	Weston Field Rink • Williamstown, Massachusetts	W 4–1	3–0–0
January 23	at Army*	Stuart Rink • West Point, New York	W 1–0	4–0–0
January 29	St. Dominique's*	Lake Andrews Rink • Lewiston, Maine	L 1–2 ^{OT}	4–1–0
February 6	Maine*	Lake Andrews Rink • Lewiston, Maine	W 4–0	5–1–0
February 9	at Colby*	Colby Rink • Waterville, Maine	W 5–1	6–1–0
February 13	at Maine*	Alumni Field Rink • Orono, Maine	W 5–0	7–1–0
February 15	vs. Colby*	Auburn Rink • Auburn, Maine	W 2–0	8–1–0
February 22	St. Dominique's*	Lake Andrews Rink • Lewiston, Maine	L 0–4	8–2–0
February 23	vs. Colby*	Augusta, Maine	W 3–1	9–2–0
*Non-conference game.

== Scoring statistics ==
Name	Position	Games	Goals
Joe Cogan	C	11	22
Pop Corey	LW/RW	11	5
Dick Stanley	D	11	5
Red Scott	D	5	1
Johnnie O'Connor	LW/RW	11	1
Don Bryant	D/C/RW	3	0
Tibbie Leonardi	LW	5	0
Al Lane	C/LW	7	0
Junie Stanley	D/LW	10	0
Dave Wyllie	G	11	0
Total			34
