= 1923–24 United States collegiate men's ice hockey season =

- Duration: December 1923– March 1924
- East Collegiate champion: Yale
- West Collegiate champion: Minnesota

The 1923–24 United States collegiate men's ice hockey season was the 30th season of collegiate ice hockey in the United States.

== Regular season ==
=== Standings ===
1923–24 Eastern Collegiate ice hockey standings
	Intercollegiate							Overall					
	GP	W	L	T	Pct.	GF	GA	GP	W	L	T	GF	GA
Amherst	11	5	5	1	.500	16	17	11	5	5	1	16	17
Army	6	3	3	0	.500	15	13	8	3	5	0	23	30
Bates	8	8	0	0	1.000	31	3	11	9	2	0	34	9
Boston College	1	1	0	0	1.000	6	3	18	7	10	1	32	45
Boston University	7	1	6	0	.143	10	34	9	1	8	0	11	42
Bowdoin	5	1	2	2	.400	10	17	6	1	3	2	10	24
Clarkson	4	1	3	0	.250	6	12	7	3	4	0	11	19
Colby	7	1	4	2	.286	9	18	8	1	5	2	11	21
Cornell	4	2	2	0	.500	22	11	4	2	2	0	22	11
Dartmouth	–	–	–	–	–	–	–	17	10	5	2	81	32
Hamilton	–	–	–	–	–	–	–	12	7	3	2	–	–
Harvard	9	6	3	0	.667	35	19	18	6	10	2	–	–
Maine	7	3	4	0	.429	20	18	12	4	8	0	33	60
Massachusetts Agricultural	8	2	6	0	.250	17	38	9	3	6	0	19	38
Middlebury	5	0	4	1	.100	2	10	7	0	6	1	3	16
MIT	4	0	4	0	.000	2	27	4	0	4	0	2	27
Pennsylvania	6	1	4	1	.250	6	23	8	1	5	2	8	28
Princeton	13	8	5	0	.615	35	20	18	12	6	0	63	28
Rensselaer	5	2	3	0	.400	5	31	5	2	3	0	5	31
Saint Michael's	–	–	–	–	–	–	–	–	–	–	–	–	–
Syracuse	2	1	1	0	.500	5	11	6	2	4	0	11	24
Union	4	2	2	0	.500	13	10	5	3	2	0	18	12
Williams	11	2	7	2	.273	11	22	13	4	7	2	18	24
Yale	15	14	1	0	.933	60	12	23	18	4	1	80	33
YMCA College	6	1	5	0	.167	6	39	7	2	5	0	11	39

1923–24 Western Collegiate ice hockey standings
	Intercollegiate							Overall					
	GP	W	L	T	Pct.	GF	GA	GP	W	L	T	GF	GA
A.T. Still	–	–	–	–	–	–	–	–	–	–	–	–	–
Marquette	7	3	4	0	.429	10	13	8	3	5	0	11	15
Michigan	–	–	–	–	–	–	–	11	6	4	1	24	24
Michigan College of Mines	0	0	0	0	–	0	0	5	0	5	0	–	–
Minnesota	–	–	–	–	–	–	–	14	13	1	0	–	–
Notre Dame	2	0	2	0	.000	2	5	5	0	5	0	5	20
Wisconsin	–	–	–	–	–	–	–	13	3	9	1	–	–

1923–24 Minnesota Intercollegiate Athletic Conference ice hockey standings
	Conference							Overall					
	GP	W	L	T	PTS	GF	GA	GP	W	L	T	GF	GA
St. Thomas	2	2	0	0	1.000	26	1	10	8	2	0	73	15
Carleton	3	2	1	0	.667	9	14	5	3	2	0	17	26
Macalester	3	0	3	0	.000	2	22	4	1	3	0	5	23
No Champion Named

1923–24 Triangular Hockey League standings
	Conference								Overall					
	GP	W	L	T	PTS	SW	GF	GA	GP	W	L	T	GF	GA
Yale *	5	4	1	0	.800	2	15	6	23	18	4	1	80	33
Harvard	4	2	2	0	.500	1	7	12	18	6	10	2	–	–
Princeton	5	1	4	0	.200	0	8	12	18	12	6	0	63	28
* indicates conference champion
