= Gerry Geran =

American ice hockey player (1896–1981)

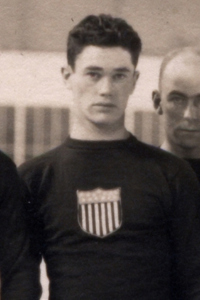
- Geran at the 1920 Summer Olympics
- Born: August 3, 1896 Holyoke, Massachusetts, U.S.
- Died: September 8, 1981 (aged 85) Brooklyn, New York, U.S.
- Height: 5 ft 9 in (175 cm)
- Weight: 180 lb (82 kg; 12 st 12 lb)
- Position: Center
- Shot: Right
- Played for: Montreal Wanderers; Français Volants; Boston Bruins; Racing Club de France
- National team: United States
- Playing career: 1917–1933
Medal record
Olympic Games
Silver medal – second place	1920 Antwerp	Team

Pierce George "Gerry" Geran (August 3, 1896 – September 8, 1981) was an American ice hockey player. The first American-born player in the National Hockey League (NHL), he appeared in four games with the Montreal Wanderers in the NHL's first season, 1917–18. He would later play one season in France, the first American to do so, and spent several years playing in the United States Amateur Hockey Association. He returned to the NHL in 1925–26 with the Boston Bruins, and finished his career one season later in the American Hockey Association. Internationally Geran played for the American national team at the 1920 Summer Olympics, the first Olympics to feature ice hockey, and won a silver medal.

== Playing career ==
Geran was the first player from the United States to make the NHL, starting with the Montreal Wanderers in the NHL's inaugural season, 1917–18. The Wanderers arena, the Westmount Arena, burnt down on January 2, 1918, and with no alternative the team folded after six games; Geran had played in four of them but recorded no points.

In 1921–22 Geran signed with Français Volants, a team based in Paris, becoming the first American to play in France. He scored 88 goals in eight games there. He returned to the US and spent the next several years playing in Boston in the United States Amateur Hockey Association, and in 1925 went back to the NHL as he signed with the Boston Bruins. The manager of the Bruins was Art Ross, who had been Geran's teammate on the Wanderers and a good friend. Geran played 33 games in 1925–26, scoring five goals and one assist, and left the league after that. In 37 career NHL games, he scored five goals and six points.

Geran's first two goals as a Bruin came in the same game, his team's 5-3 loss to the Pittsburgh Pirates on December 11, 1925.

He joined the St. Paul Saints of the new American Hockey Association, and spent one year there. He returned to France in 1932 and played a final season of hockey with Racing Club de France before retiring. At the time of his retirement from hockey, in 1933, Geran was the last player from the Wanderers still playing professional hockey. After retiring he took part in a 1941 effort to unionize hockey players, but that did not lead to anything, and his last known work was in 1962 as a federal worker in New York City.

== International career ==
Geran was named to the American national team for the 1920 Summer Olympics in Antwerp, Belgium, the first Olympics to feature ice hockey, and helped them win the silver medal, scoring a hat trick against Sweden. In spite of this professional obstacle, he was nevertheless allowed to play in the Olympic Games. He was named to the American team for the 1924 Winter Olympics, but never joined the team, though it is not clear why.

== Career statistics ==
=== Regular season and playoffs ===
			Regular season					Playoffs
Season	Team	League	GP	G	A	Pts	PIM	GP	G	A	Pts	PIM
1915–16	Dartmouth College	Uni	6	1	0	1	12	—	—	—	—	—
1916–17	Dartmouth College	Uni	—	—	—	—	—	—	—	—	—	—
1917–18	Boston Navy Yard	USNHL	11	7	0	7	—	—	—	—	—	—
1917–18	Montreal Wanderers	NHL	4	0	0	0	0	—	—	—	—	—
1919–20	Boston Shoe Trades	USAHA	—	—	—	—	—	—	—	—	—	—
1920–21	Boston Shoe Trades	USAHA	6	3	0	3	—	—	—	—	—	—
1921–22	Français Volants	FRA	8	88	0	88	0	—	—	—	—	—
1922–23	Boston AA Unicorns	USAHA	9	14	0	14	—	4	4	0	4	—
1923–24	Boston AA Unicorns	USAHA	10	9	0	9	—	3	3	1	4	—
1924–25	Boston AA Unicorns	USAHA	19	13	0	13	—	4	0	0	0	0
1925–26	Boston Bruins	NHL	33	5	1	6	6	—	—	—	—	—
1926–27	St. Paul Saints	AHA	12	1	1	2	0	—	—	—	—	—
1932–33	Racing Club de France	FRA	—	—	—	—	—	—	—	—	—	—
NHL totals			37	5	1	6	6	—	—	—	—	—

=== International ===
Year	Team	Event	GP	G	A	Pts	PIM
1920	United States	Oly	2	3	0	3	0
Senior totals			2	3	0	3	0
