= Ag Smith =

Canadian-American ice hockey player and referee

- Born: August 10, 1894 Jarvis, Ontario, Canada
- Died: October 12, 1972 (aged 78)
- Height: 5 ft 10 in (178 cm)
- Weight: 180 lb (82 kg; 12 st 12 lb)
- Position: Defence
- Played for: Commerce Bank; Hamilton Tigers; Westminster Hockey Club; Boston A. A. Boston Tigers
- Playing career: 1912–1927

Adam George "Ag" Smith (August 10, 1894 – October 12, 1972) was a Canadian-American ice hockey player and official. After an amateur hockey career in Hamilton, Ontario and Boston, Smith spent 13 years as an official in the National Hockey League.

== Early life ==
Smith was one of 11 children born to Mr. and Mrs. Robert W. Smith. He began his hockey career at the age of 14 in his hometown of Jarvis, Ontario. During the 1912–13 season, he played for the Commerce team in the Bank League. He then moved to Saskatchewan, where he played for teams in Caron and Moose Jaw.

== World War I ==
On December 10, 1915, Smith joined the 68th Battalion of the Canadian Expeditionary Force. He was later transferred to the 7th Battalion. He suffered a gunshot wound to his left wrist during the Battle of Vimy Ridge. Later that year he fractured his leg playing baseball in Seaford, East Sussex. His unit was demobilized in September 1919 and he returned to Canada on the RMS Royal George the following month. He was discharged on November 9, 1919.

== Hockey career ==
Smith resumed his playing career in 1919 with the Hamilton Tigers of the OHA Senior A League. In 1921, he and teammate Herb Rhéaume moved to Boston and joined the Westminster Hockey Club, an amateur team consisting of mostly Canadian players that captured the 1922 United States Amateur Hockey Association championship.

Smith joined the Boston Athletic Association ice hockey team in 1922 and was a member of the B.A.A. team that won the 1923 USAHA title. He served as the team's acting captain while Justin McCarthy was playing in the 1924 Winter Olympics. As Smith was not yet a U.S. citizen, he could not join his B.A.A. teammates on the Olympic squad. The B.A.A. dismissed all of the hockey players after the 1924–25 season due to rumors that they were receiving money.

During the 1926–27 season, Smith was captain of the Boston Tigers of the Canadian–American Hockey League, playing alongside former Hamilton stars George Redding, Fred Litzen, and Herb Rhéaume.

=== Officiating ===
Smith refereed Eastern Amateur Hockey League games during the 1925–26 season. In 1930, he was elected vice-president of the New England Association of Hockey Officials. In 1932, he became a referee in the Canadian–American Hockey League. He was a top referee in the CAHL's successor organization – the American Hockey League.

Smith was a National Hockey League official from 1933 to 1946. He worked primarily as a linesman at the Boston Garden, as unlike referees, they didn't rotate between cities. He worked as a linesman in other cities during the playoffs. He officiated games during 1935, 1936, 1938, 1939, and 1940 Stanley Cup Finals.

=== Coaching ===
Smith coached the amateur Boston Hockey Club during the 1931–32 season. On March 17, 1932, the club defeated the Fredericton Millionaires 8–6 in double overtime in what some observers believed to be a fixed game. As a result of the controversy, Smith resigned, five players (Winthrop Palmer, John Chase, John Garrison, Caswell McGregor, and Charles C. Cunningham) left the team, and the New England Amateur Referees' Association ordered its members not to referee any more games between the two teams.

== Later life and death ==
Smith resided in Centerville, Massachusetts until 1941, when he moved to Quincy, Massachusetts. He died on October 12, 1972 at a nursing home after a long illness. He was survived by his wife, the former Helen M. Tagen, and seven of his siblings.
