= Mickey Roach =

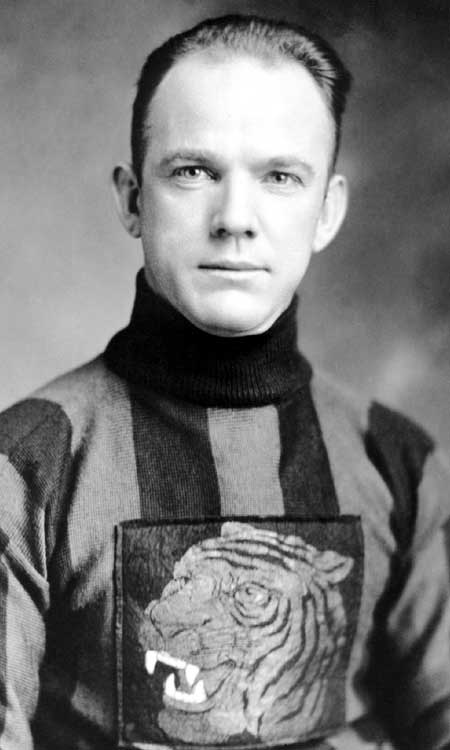
- Born: May 7, 1895 Glace Bay, Nova Scotia, Canada
- Died: April 1, 1977 (aged 81) Whitby, Ontario, Canada
- Height: 5 ft 6 in (168 cm)
- Weight: 158 lb (72 kg; 11 st 4 lb)
- Position: Centre
- Shot: Left
- Played for: Toronto St. Pats; Hamilton Tigers; New York Americans
- Playing career: 1913–1931

Michael Richard Roach (May 7, 1895 – April 1, 1977) was a Canadian-born professional ice hockey player who played eight seasons in the National Hockey League for the Toronto St. Pats, Hamilton Tigers and New York Americans. He was born in Glace Bay, Nova Scotia but moved to Boston, Massachusetts during his early life.

Roach is co-holder of the NHL record for most goals scored in a single period. He scored 4 goals and added 1 assist during a game against the Quebec Bulldogs on 03/06/1920 while playing for the Toronto St. Patricks.

Following his retirement from hockey, he joined the Canadian Customs office in Sydney, Nova Scotia. Roach later joined the Glace Bay baseball team, playing in the Cape Breton Professional Baseball League where was a left-handed star at both first and third base. Mickey Roach is an original member of the Nova Scotia Sport Hall of Fame.

== Career statistics ==
=== Regular season and playoffs ===
			Regular season					Playoffs
Season	Team	League	GP	G	A	Pts	PIM	GP	G	A	Pts	PIM
1913–14	Boston Pilgrims	Exhib.	8	4	0	4	—	2	0	0	0	3
1913–14	Boston English High	High-MA	—	—	—	—	—	—	—	—	—	—
1914–15	Boston Arenas	AAHL	10	14	0	14	—	7	4	0	4	—
1915–16	Boston Arenas	AAHL	6	11	0	11	—	—	—	—	—	—
1916–17	Brooklyn Crescents	AAHL	6	5	0	5	—	6	4	0	4	—
1917–18	New York Wanderers	USNHL	10	12	0	12	—	—	—	—	—	—
1918–19	Hamilton Tigers	OHA-Sr.	8	17	12	29	—	4	4	3	7	—
1918–19	Hamilton Tigers	Al-Cup	—	—	—	—	—	2	1	1	2	0
1919–20	Toronto St. Pats	NHL	21	11	2	13	4	—	—	—	—	—
1920–21	Toronto St. Pats	NHL	9	1	1	2	2	—	—	—	—	—
1920–21	Hamilton Tigers	NHL	14	9	8	17	0	—	—	—	—	—
1921–22	Hamilton Tigers	NHL	24	14	6	20	7	—	—	—	—	—
1922–23	Hamilton Tigers	NHL	24	17	10	27	8	—	—	—	—	—
1923–24	Hamilton Tigers	NHL	20	5	3	8	7	—	—	—	—	—
1924–25	Hamilton Tigers	NHL	30	6	4	10	8	—	—	—	—	—
1925–26	New York Americans	NHL	25	3	0	3	4	—	—	—	—	—
1926–27	New York Americans	NHL	44	11	0	11	14	—	—	—	—	—
1927–28	Niagara Falls Cataracts	Can-Pro	41	12	6	18	23	—	—	—	—	—
1928–29	Windsor Bulldogs	Can-Pro	42	8	9	17	0	7	1	0	1	2
1929–30	Buffalo Bisons	IHL	10	0	0	0	0	—	—	—	—	—
NHL totals			211	77	34	111	54	—	—	—	—	—

== See also ==
- List of players with five or more goals in an NHL game
