= Raymie Skilton =

American ice hockey player

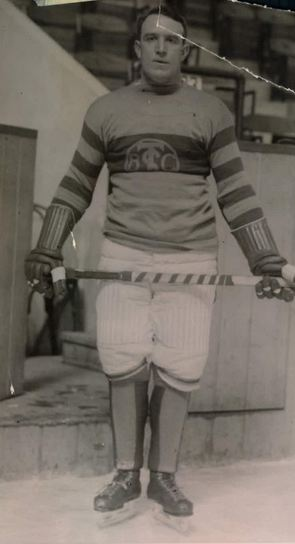
- Born: September 26, 1889 Cambridge, Massachusetts, U.S.
- Died: July 1, 1961 (aged 71)
- Height: 5 ft 10 in (178 cm)
- Weight: 190 lb (86 kg; 13 st 8 lb)
- Position: Defense
- Shot: Right
- Played for: Montreal Wanderers
- Playing career: 1911–1923

Raymond Nelson Skilton (September 26, 1889 – July 1, 1961) was an American ice hockey defenseman who played one game in the National Hockey League for the Montreal Wanderers. The rest of his career was spent playing amateur hockey in the Boston area, and he retired in 1923.

== Playing career ==
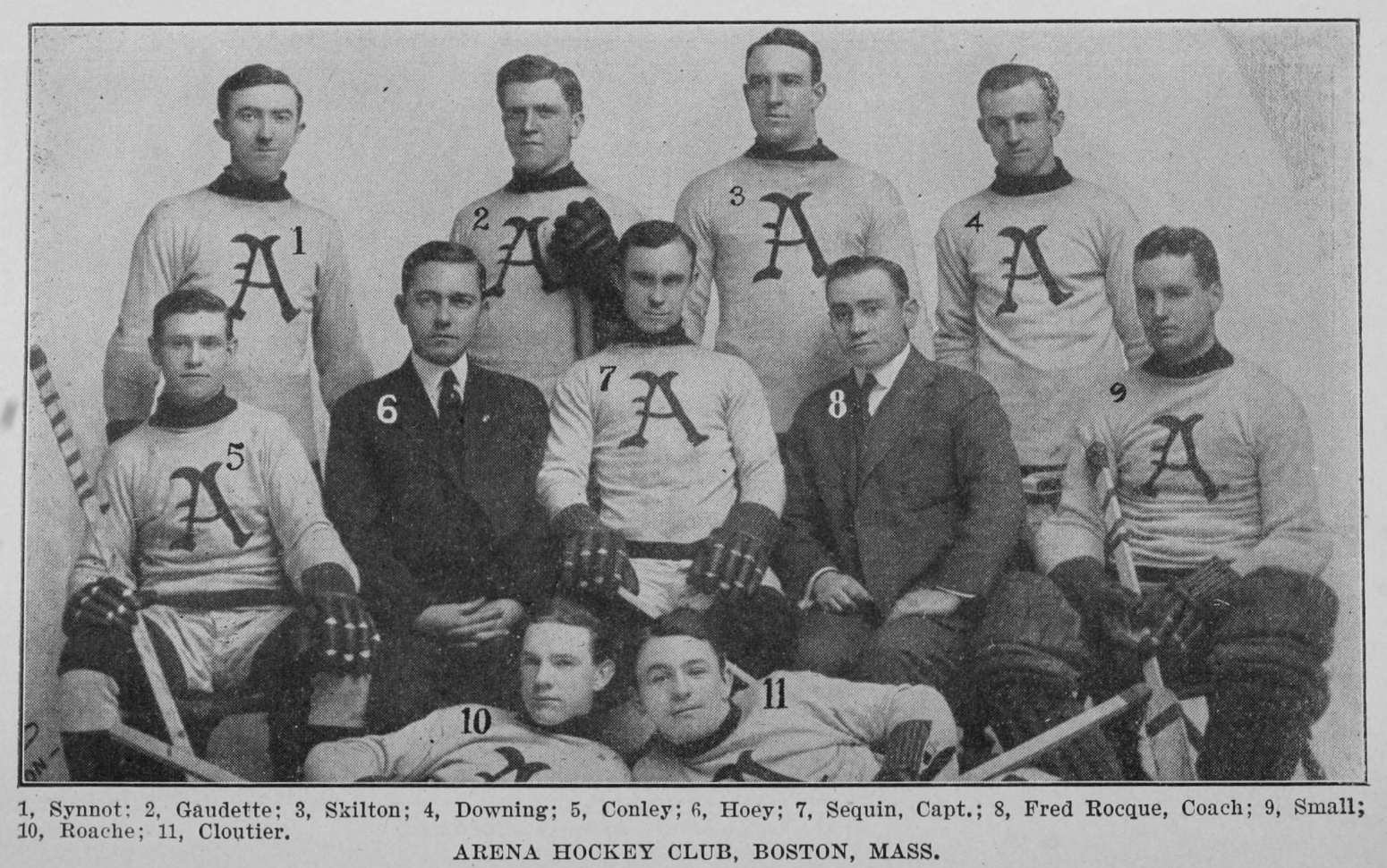
Boston Arenas in 1914–15. Skilton (3) is standing third from left in the top row.

Skilton was working as a munitions expert posted by the U.S. government in Montreal and offered the Wanderers $1 to play in the NHL. His lone game came on December 22, 1917, against the Montreal Canadiens. He continued to play amateur hockey in the Boston area after World War I.

== Legal issues ==
In 1926, Skilton was found not guilty of leaving the scene of an accident.

In 1928, Skilton was charged with larceny of $10,000 from the Framingham National Bank. The bank accused Skilton of making a false statement by claiming assets of over $150,000 during loan negotiations when he was virtually bankrupt. Skilton contented that the bank knew of his financial situation and was acquitted. He later sued the bank and 10 individuals for malicious prosecution. He sought $1.5 million, but a jury awarded him $13,508 from one defendant – Framingham police chief William W. Holbrook.

On January 21, 1929, Skilton was found in contempt of court for failing to pay a $287.19 judgment against him. He was released from jail later that day after arranging to pay the judgment.

In 1939, Skilton was shot by his father-in-law Sewall Ellison. Ellison claimed that Skilton had attacked him and his gun went off accidentally when he drew it in self-defense. He was found not guilty of attempted murder.

== Career statistics ==
=== Regular season and playoffs ===
| | | | Regular season | | | | | Playoffs |
| Season | Team | League | GP | G | A | Pts | PIM | GP | G | A | Pts | PIM |
|---|---|---|---|---|---|---|---|---|---|---|---|---|
| 1911–12 | Boston AA Unicorns | BSrHA | — | — | — | — | — | — | — | — | — | — |
| 1912–13 | Sherbrooke Saints | IPAHU | — | — | — | — | — | — | — | — | — | — |
| 1913–14 | Boston Irish Americans | Exib | 7 | 8 | 0 | 8 | — | — | — | — | — | — |
| 1914–15 | Boston Arenas | Exhib | 5 | 9 | 0 | 9 | — | 6 | 7 | 0 | 7 | — |
| 1915–16 | Boston AA Unicorns | AAHL | 7 | 2 | 0 | 2 | — | 3 | 2 | 0 | 2 | — |
| 1916–17 | Boston Arenas | AAHL | 8 | 4 | 0 | 4 | — | — | — | — | — | — |
| 1917–18 | Montreal Wanderers | NHL | 1 | 0 | 0 | 0 | 0 | — | — | — | — | — |
| 1917–18 | Boston Navy Yard | USNHL | 11 | 11 | 0 | 11 | — | — | — | — | — | — |
| 1920–21 | Boston Shoe Trades | USAHA | 3 | 2 | 0 | 2 | — | — | — | — | — | — |
| 1921–22 | Boston Shoe Trades | USAHA | — | — | — | — | — | — | — | — | — | — |
| 1922–23 | Boston Vics | NHL | 3 | 1 | 0 | 1 | — | — | — | — | — | — |
| NHL totals | | | 1 | 0 | 0 | 0 | 0 | — | — | — | — | — |

== See also ==
- List of players who played only one game in the NHL
