= Irving Small =

American ice hockey player

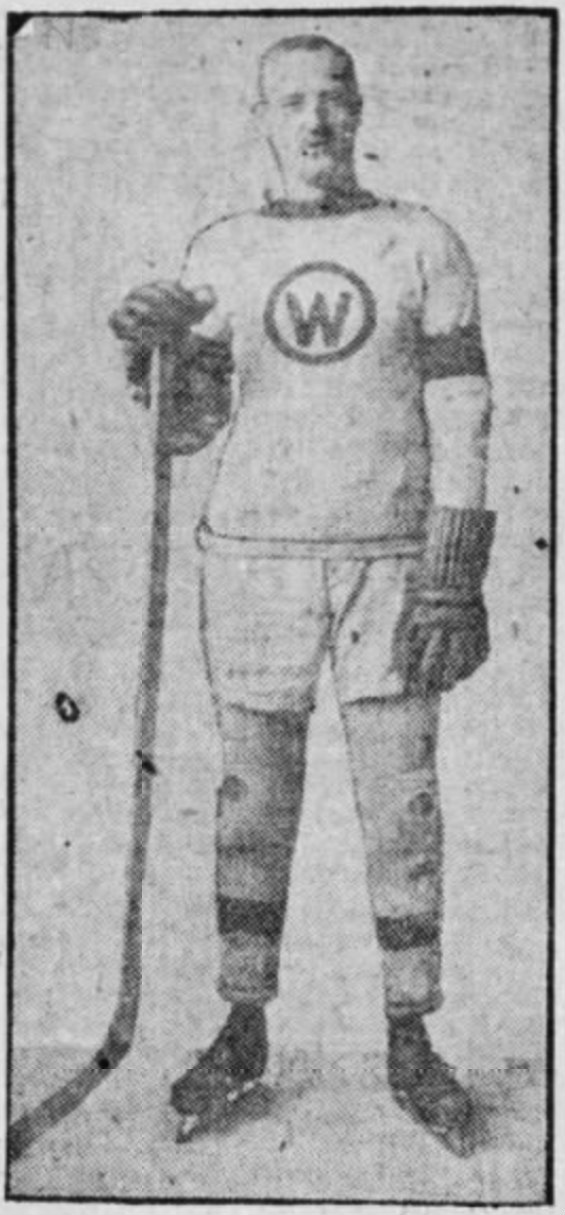
- Small with the Westminster Hockey Club in 1921–22
- Born: July 9, 1891 Cambridge, Massachusetts, U.S.
- Died: December 12, 1955 (aged 64) Monrovia, California, U.S.
- Weight: 174 lb (79 kg; 12 st 6 lb)
- Position: Forward/Defence
- Shot: Left
- Played for: Boston Arenas; Boston Shoe Trades; Westminster Hockey Club; Boston A.A.
- National team: United States
- Playing career: 1910–1925
Medal record
Men's Ice hockey
Representing the United States
Silver medal – second place	1924 Chamonix	Team

Irving Wheeler Small (July 19, 1891 – December 12, 1955) was an American ice hockey player who took part in the 1924 Winter Olympics. He played on the U.S. national ice hockey team that earned the silver medal at the Chamonix Games that year.

== Biography ==
Small was born in Cambridge, Massachusetts, and spent his early years growing up in the state, where he played amateur hockey in Boston. In 1913, he relocated to California but continued to travel back east during the winters to compete in hockey. He captured the 1922 United States Amateur Hockey Association (USAHA) championship as a member of the Westminster Hockey Club. The following year, he helped the Boston Athletic Association ice hockey team secure the 1923 USAHA title and was one of five B.A.A. players chosen to represent the United States at the 1924 Winter Olympics.

In May 1925, Small initiated legal action against the New Boston Arena Company, asserting that he was entitled to $1,000 in unpaid salary for his time playing with the B.A.A. hockey team. Small alleged that the Arena's management covertly paid its amateur players, violating the amateurism rules of the time, with some athletes reportedly earning as much as $2,500 per year. He further claimed that these secret payments were concealed in hidden locations throughout the arena to avoid detection. However, rather than proceed through a lengthy court battle, both sides reached an undisclosed out-of-court agreement, and the lawsuit was formally withdrawn on May 22, 1925.

Small died on December 12, 1955, in Monrovia, California.
