= 1950–51 1re série season =

French professional ice hockey season

The 1950–51 1re série season was the 30th season of the 1re série, the top level of ice hockey in France. Five teams participated in the league, and Racing Club de France won their second championship.

== First round ==
=== Paris Group ===
	Club
1.	Racing Club de France
2.	CO Billancourt
3.	Paris Université Club

=== Alpes Group ===
	Club
1.	Chamonix Hockey Club
2.	Diables Rouges de Briançon

== Final round ==
	Club	GP	W	T	L	GF	GA	Pts
1.	Racing Club de France	2	1	1	0	14	8	3
2.	Chamonix Hockey Club	2	1	1	0	13	9	3
3.	CO Billancourt	2	0	0	2	5	15	0
