= Justin McCarthy (ice hockey) =

American ice hockey player

Olympic medal record

Men's Ice hockey
Silver medal – second place	1924 Chamonix	Team competition

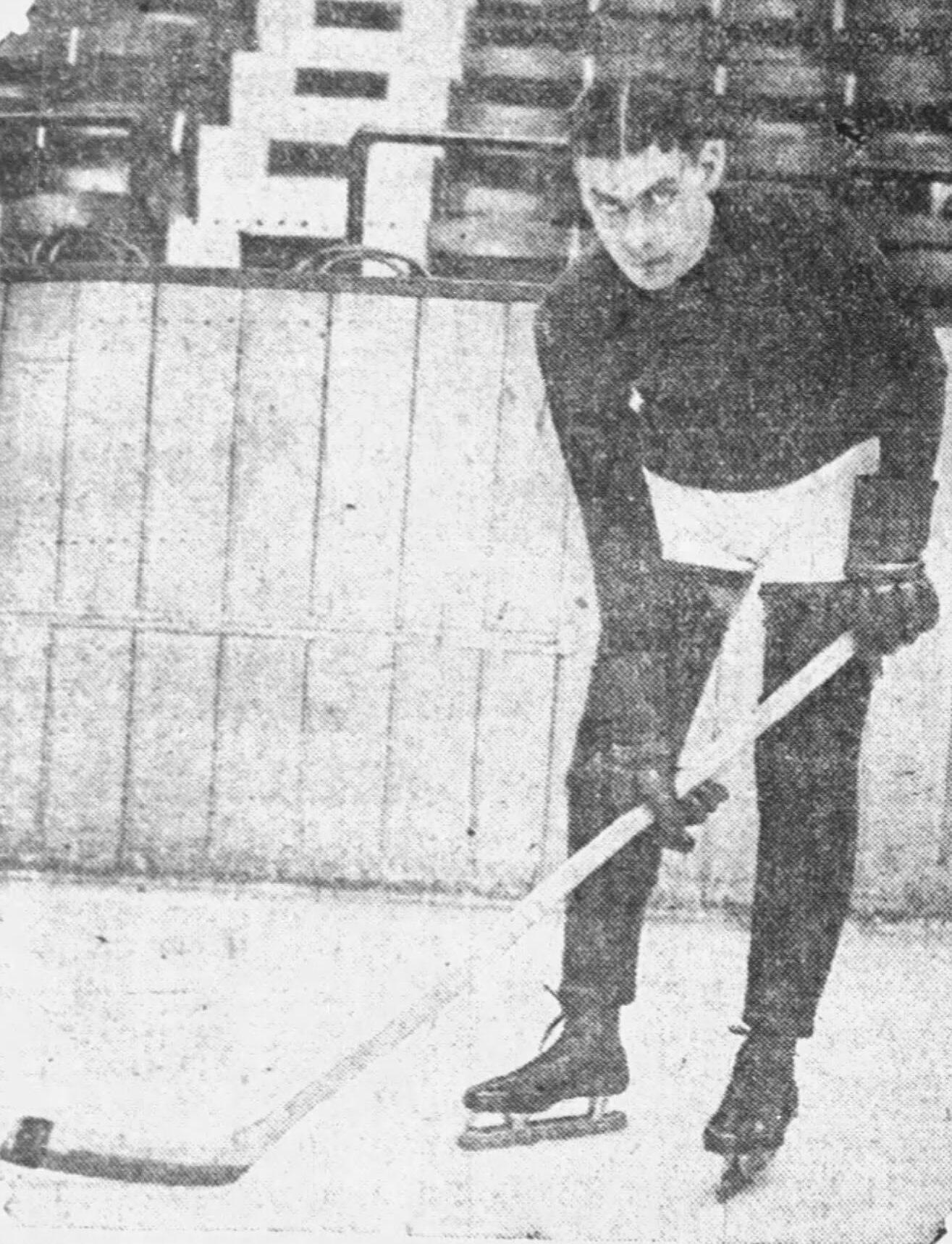
1923 photograph in the Boston Globe of McCarthy

Justin Jeremiah "Jerry" McCarthy (January 25, 1899 – April 8, 1976) was an American ice hockey player who competed in the 1924 Winter Olympics.

He was a graduate of the Massachusetts Agricultural College in 1921, (later, the University of Massachusetts), where he was a member of Phi Sigma Kappa fraternity. He played for the Boston Athletic Association ice hockey team and was captain of the B.A.A team that won the 1923 United States Amateur Hockey Association championship.

Selected for the USA squad, McCarthy was the captain of the American ice hockey team, which won the silver medal. He died in Centerville, Massachusetts.
