= Boston Athletic Association ice hockey team =

American amateur ice hockey team

Boston Athletic Association
- City: Boston; USA
- League: AAHL (1914–17); USAHA (1920–25); EAHL (1925–26)
- Operated: 1911–1926
- Home arena: Boston Arena
- Owner: Boston Athletic Association
- General manager: George V. Brown (1911–21); Tom Kanaly (1921–26)
- Head coach: Alfred Winsor (1911–15); Fred Huntington (1915–17); Alfred Winsor (1921–22); Fred Rocque (1922–23); Skeets Canterbury (1923–26)
- Captain: Alfred Winsor (1911–12); Trafford Hicks (1912–14); Fred Huntington (1914–17); Jack Hutchinson (1920); Leon Tuck (1920–21); George A. Percy (1921); Dave Ingalls (1921–22); Justin McCarthy (1922–24); Ag Smith (1924)

The Boston Athletic Association ice hockey team was an American amateur ice hockey team sponsored by the Boston Athletic Association that played in the American Amateur Hockey League, United States Amateur Hockey Association, and Eastern Amateur Hockey League. The team won the AAHL title in 1916 and 1917 and the USAHA championship in 1923, and the EAHL title in 1926. The team was nicknamed the Unicorn after the association's symbol.

== Beginnings ==
=== 1911–12 ===
Team founder George V. Brown

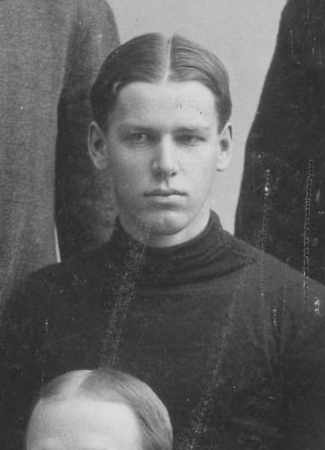
Inaugural coach Alfred Winsor

Following the construction of the Boston Arena, Boston Athletic Association athletic director George V. Brown pushed for the creation of a B.A.A. hockey team to play in the new building. Most of the initial members of B.A.A. club came from the Boston Hockey Club; an amateur team consisting of former Harvard players. Alfred Winsor was the B.A.A.’s first captain and head coach. Other members of the inaugural team were Skeets Canterbury, Trafford Hicks, George Peabody Gardner Jr., Ralph Hornblower, Howard C. “Old Doc” Leslie, Newton Foster, John Foster, Hatherly Foster Jr., Peter Sortwell, and John Heron.

The B.A.A. played its first game on November 17, 1911, against the Massachusetts Institute of Technology. The B.A.A. won 6–2.

The 1911–12 team scored victories against the St. Nicholas Hockey Club, Amherst Aggies, Montreal Westmount, New York Athletic Club, University of Ottawa, the Montreal AAA, tied the Intercolonials, and lost to McGill University, the Montreal Victorias, the Cleveland Athletic Club, and the Sherbrooke Canadiens. The B.A.A. and the Intercolonial hockey team played a best of five series for the Massachusetts hockey championship, which the Intercolonials won in four games. Afterwards, the B.A.A. played one additional game, which ended in an 8–6 victory over the Montreal Victorias.

=== 1912–13 ===
Hicks replaced Winsor as the captain for the 1912–13 season and Robert Clifford replaced Winsor as the starting center. Also joining the team this season were Forrest Osgood, Fred Huntington, and Harry Gardner.

The B.A.A. started their season on November 28, 1912, with a 7–5 victory over Harvard. The B.A.A. defeated MIT, St. Nicholas, Irish American Athletic Club, University of Toronto, St. Nicholas, McGill University, and Montreal AAA before losing their first game to the University of Toronto on January 16, 1913. The B.A.A. also dropped its next game to the Hobey Baker-led Princeton Tigers. They finished the season out with victories against the Montreal Victorias, Trois-Rivières, McGill University, Ottawa Stewartons, and Winnipeg All-Stars. The B.A.A. was scheduled to play the Sherbrooke Canadians on March 1, 1913, but refused to play.

=== 1913–14 ===
Charles L. Foote and Ollie Chadwick were added to the team during the 1913–14 season. The B.A.A. defeated regular opponents Harvard, St. Nicholas, University of Toronto, and MIT. They once again lost to Hobey Baker's Princeton Tigers. Games against the New York Wanderers and the Montreal AAA ended in ties, with the later game concluding at the end of the first half when Winsor unsuccessfully demanded a change of officials.

The 1913–14 season featured the first series between the B.A.A. and the city's other leading athletic club, the Pilgrim Athletic Association. The B.A.A. won the series two games to none.

== American Amateur Hockey League ==
=== 1914–15 ===
On November 12, 1914, the B.A.A. was admitted to the American Amateur Hockey League, becoming the league's first team outside of New York City. Prior to the start of the season, Foote left the team to join an automobile ambulance corps and Sortwell was unable to play due to outside commitments. Hamlyn Robbins, Paul Smart, Stephen Hopkins, Dettmar Jones, and Jack Hutchinson began playing for the B.A.A this year. Fred Huntington was elected team captain.

Prior to the start of the AAHL season, the B.A.A. played a series of games against college teams. After losing to the University of Ottawa, they defeated the University of Toronto, Harvard, and Princeton.

The B.A.A. finished the AAHL season with a 6–2 record, good for second place in the five-team league.

The B.A.A. played a seven-game series against the city's other top amateur team, the Boston Arenas, which the Arenas won 4 games to 3.

=== 1915–16 ===
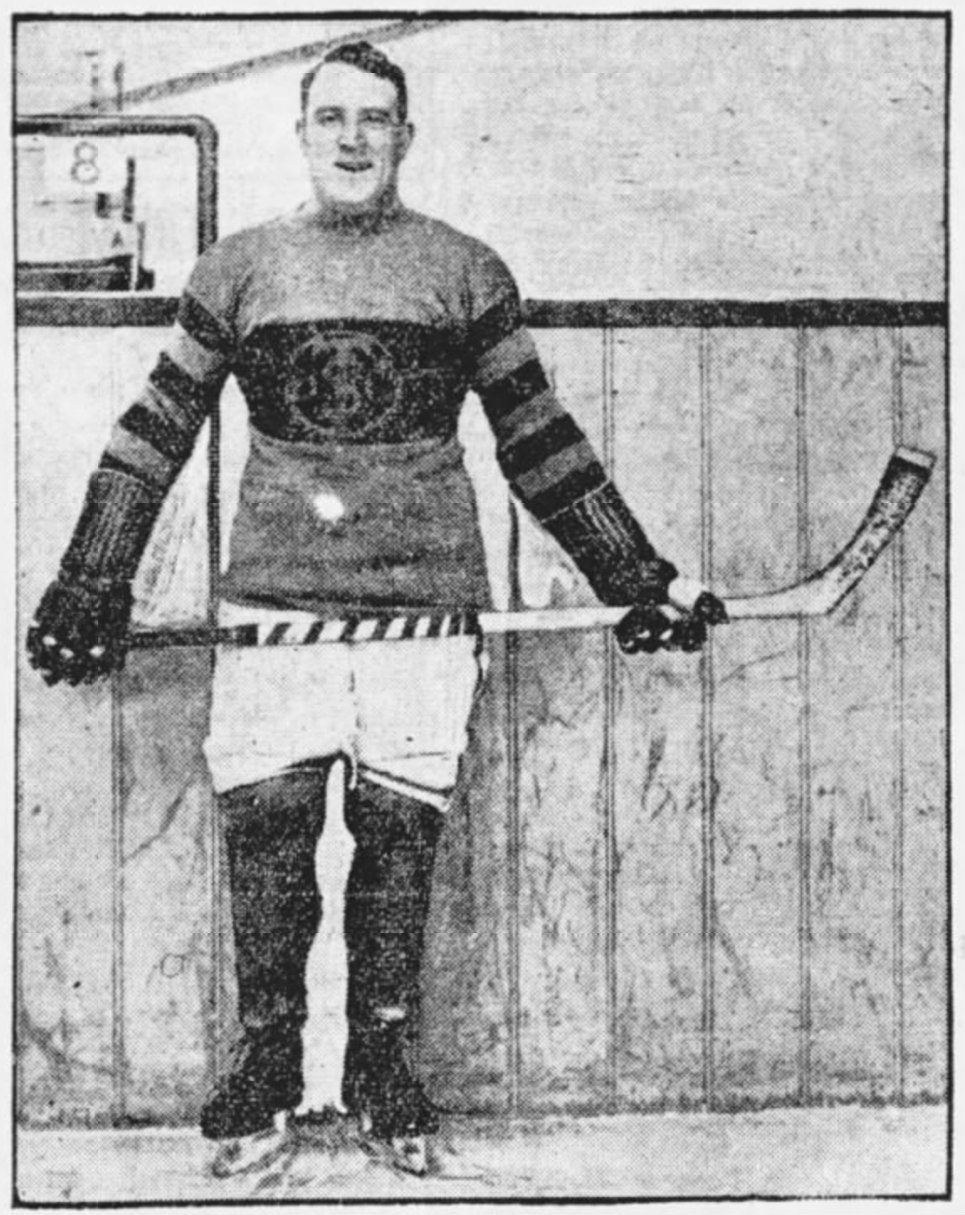
Raymie Skilton as a member of the Boston Shoe Trades

A second Boston team, the Harvard Club, joined the AAHL for the 1915–16 season. B.A.A. coach Alfred Winsor left to coach the Harvard Club and was replaced by Fred Huntington. Raymie Skilton, the star of the Boston Arenas the previous season, and Dartmouth goaltender Arthur Donahue, both joined the team for the 1915–16 season. Huntington also secured the services of some former high school players, including Cliff Peabody, Don Sands, Milton Stearns, and Sammy Wendell.

On December 22, 1915, Huntington, Harvard Club captain William Henry Claflin Jr., Arena Hockey Club manager Dr. Edward F. Murphy, and Boston Arena manager Walter Loguee organized a Boston Hockey League. The three teams would play a round-robin schedule of 12 games to determine the city champion.

On January 29, the B.A.A. defeated Yale 6–1 at the New Haven Arena.

The Boston Athletic Association and St. Nicholas Hockey Club both finished the AAHL season with 6–2 records and played a three-game playoff series to determine the champion. The first game was played on March 18, 1916, at the St. Nicholas Rink and was won 4–1 by the B.A.A. Game two was played a week later at the Boston Arena and drew a crowd of 5,000. St. Nicholas won 2–1 to tie the series. On April 1, the B.A.A. won the deciding game 7–0.

On April 5, the Arenas defeated the B.A.A. 4–2 to win the Boston League championship.

=== 1916–17 ===
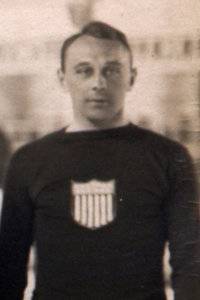
Leon Tuck in 1920

After protracted negotiations, the B.A.A. and the Boston Arena reached an agreement on December 13, 1916, that would allow the team to play there for the 1916–17 season. As part of the agreement, the B.A.A. would receive an increase in the amount of money they received from the arena.

Huntington, Skilton, Donahue, Sands, Jones, and Hutchinson all returned for the 1916–17 season. They were joined by newcomers Leon Tuck and Frank Downing.

For the 1916–17 season, the AAHL was split into two divisions – one consisting of four teams from New York City (St. Nicholas, Brooklyn Crescents, the New York Hockey Club, and the Irish American Athletic Club) and the other consisting of three Boston teams (the B.A.A., the Arenas, and the Harvard Club, which had changed its name to the Boston Hockey Club).

On December 18, 1916, the B.A.A. and Harvard played a game that saw the teams use a total of 46 players (28 by Harvard and 18 by the B.A.A.). The B.A.A. won 6–0.

The B.A.A finished the regular season with a 4–3 record, which put them in second place behind the Arenas. To decide the league champions, the top two teams in each division played in a double round robin tournament. The B.A.A. beat the Arenas and Irish A.C. twice and split its series with the Crescents to win the AAHL title for a second year in a row.

=== B.A.A. drops hockey ===
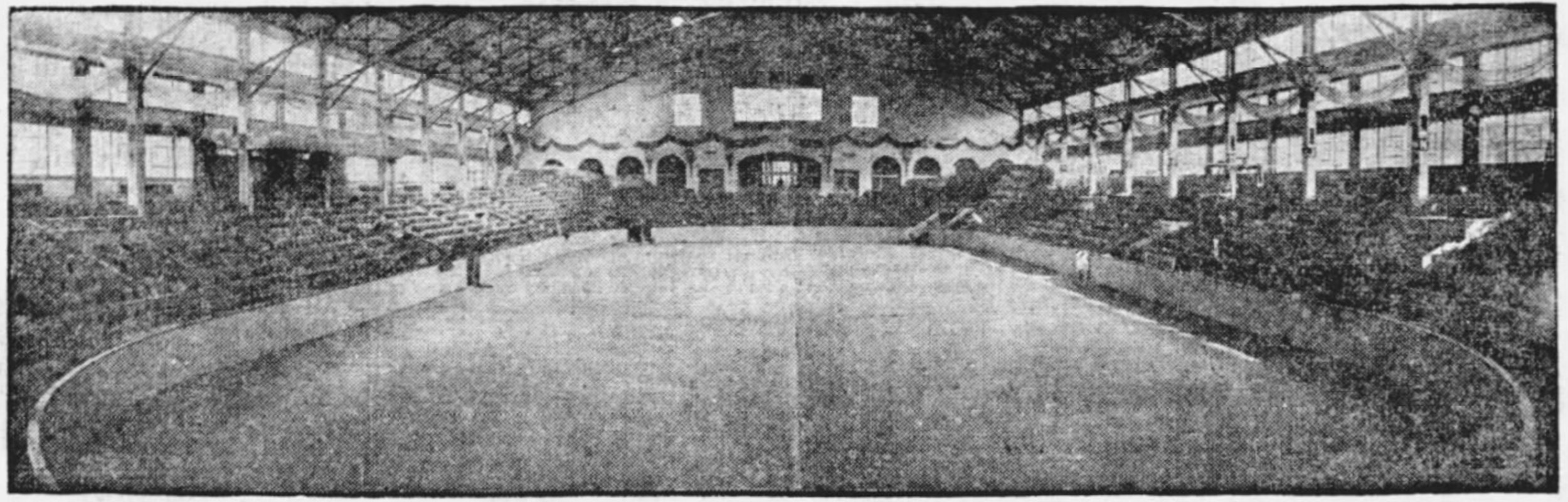
Rebuilt Boston Arena in 1920

On December 22, 1917, the Boston Athletic Association voted to abolish its hockey club. All of the team's members were serving in the armed forces and many were fighting with the American Expeditionary Forces in France. Instead, the B.A.A. elected to focus its efforts on promoting athletic programs in the area's Army camps during World War I.

The Boston Arena was partially destroyed by fire on December 18, 1918. It was rebuilt, and the new facility opened January 1, 1921.

== Post-War return ==
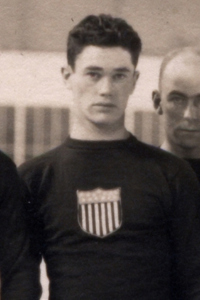
Gerry Geran in 1920

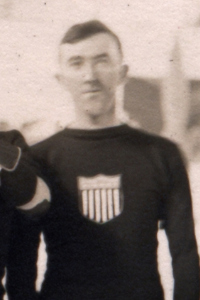
Frank Synott in 1920

In January 1920, the Boston Athletic Association returned to the ice as part of the Boston Amateur Hockey League, which consisted of the B.A.A., Harvard Club, Dartmouth Club, and Yankee Division. Due to destruction of the old Boston Arena, the teams played in the 1,100 seat Ice Pavilion in Cambridge. B.A.A. captain Jack Hutchinson was tasked with rebuilding the team. He, Willard Rice, Alphonse Lacroix, Gerry Geran, Frank Synott, Irving Small, Frank Downing, Sammy Wendell, Paul O'Sullivan, Dave Buttrick, Eddie Enright, Nelson Jost, Stanley Morton, and Wendell Reycroft would all suit up for the B.A.A this season.

On January 10, 1920, the B.A.A. defeated the Harvard varsity squad 5–4 in their first post-war game.

The B.A.A. defeated the Yankee Division 11–1, the Dartmouth Club 7–3, and Harvard Club 6–3 to win the Boston Amateur Hockey League's Pavilion Cup.

On March 13, the B.A.A. traveled to the Philadelphia Ice Palace, where they defeated the New Rochelle team 8–2.

Two of the B.A.A.’s players (Gerry Geran and Frank Synott) and one former player (Leon Tuck) played on the United States national hockey team at the 1920 Summer Olympics.

== United States Amateur Hockey Association ==
=== 1920–21 ===
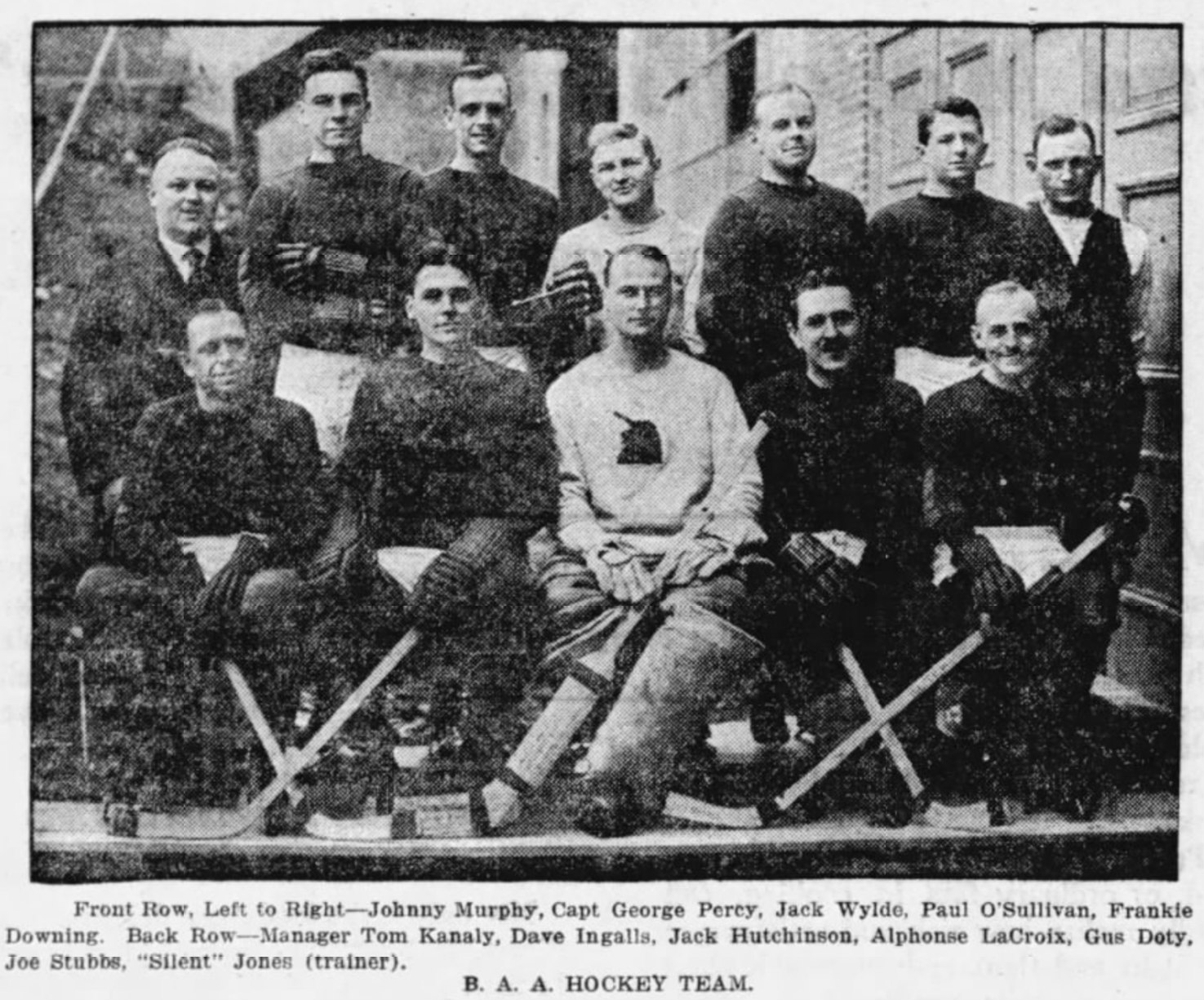
1920–21 Boston Athletic Association hockey team

The B.A.A. was one of the founding members of the United States Amateur Hockey Association. Leon Tuck, who had come over from the Dartmouth Club, was chosen to serve as interim captain of the Unicorn squad. He had a large selection of players to choose from, with Hutchinson, Downing, Rice, LaCroix, and Morton returning and former college players Johnny Murphy, Dave Ingalls, and Joe Stubbs trying out. After the Harvard Club folded, George A. Percy, Gus Doty, Jack Wylde, and Alec Bright signed with the B.A.A. Tuck's former Dartmouth Club teammate Harris Murchie also joined the team. Before the season began, Tuck was named head coach of the Dartmouth Big Green men's ice hockey team and was replaced as captain by Percy.

The B.A.A. started the season with a non-league game against Harvard, which the Edward Bigelow-led Crimson won 4–1. Their first USAHA game took place two nights later and ended in a 3–1 victory over St. Nicholas.

The USAHA's two Boston teams – the B.A.A. and the Shoe Trades, played a best-of-five in-season series for the Winsor Cup. The B.A.A won the first two games before dropping the third 4–3. On February 17, the Boston A.A. defeated the Shoe Trades 5 to 3 in double overtime to win both the Winsor Cup and the group one championship. The final game was played under protest, as the Shoe Trade's leading scorer, George Dufresne, was declared ineligible by the league.

The Unicorn played the Cleveland Athletic Club in a four-game playoff, with the winner facing Eveleth for the league championship. The teams split the series, but Cleveland advanced on goal differential (10–8).

On March 22, 1921, league president William S. Haddock reversed his decision regarding Dufresne's eligibility and ordered that the B.A.A. and the Shoe Trades play once again. If the Shoe Trades won, they would play Eveleth in a four-game series with the winner advancing to face Cleveland. On March 26, 1921, the Boston Athletic Association defeated the Shoe Trades 4–3, eliminating them from championship contention.

The B.A.A. also played a series of games against Canadian teams. They defeated La Tuque and Queen's College and lost to the Winnipeg Hockey Club and the Toronto Aura Lee (the latter team beating the B.A.A. twice).

=== 1921–22 ===
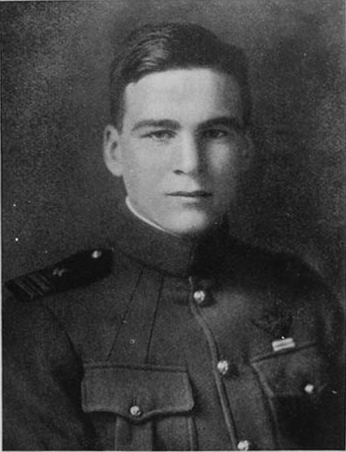
B.A.A. captain David Sinton Ingalls in military uniform

The B.A.A. added Ned Bigelow, Justin McCarthy, Harry Snelling, Bobby Emmons, and Carl Stillman to play alongside returning players Percy, Hutchinson, Ingalls, Rice, Bright, Stubbs, Doty, and LaCroix. Dave Ingalls was the team captain this season.

They started the 1921–22 season with two exhibition games against Harvard University and a contest against the Sudbury Wolves, all of which were won by the Boston Athletic Association.

Before the start of the USAHA season, a four-team tournament was held to determine which three Boston teams would make the league. The B.A.A. defeated the Melrose Hockey Club, a new team made up mostly of players who had never played club hockey before, 7–0. In the final game, the Unicorn lost to the Westminster Hockey Club 2–1. Pere Marquette defeated Melrose in the consolation game to claim the final spot. The B.A.A. finished the USAHA season with a 5–3 record, losing the eastern division to the Westministers.

The Unicorn also played against college teams, defeating MIT and Boston College and losing to the University of Toronto. On January 31, the B.A.A. and Harvard played to a 1–1 time in a charity game to raise funds for the construction of the Hobey Baker Memorial Rink.

The B.A.A. finished the season by playing against Canadian clubs, losing to the Toronto Aura Lees and Montreal Victorias.

=== 1922–23 ===
Ag Smith (formerly of the Westminsters) and Ajax Campbell (formerly of Pere Marquette) joined the Unicorn for the 1922–23 season. Also playing for the B.A.A. this year were Eddie Enright, Gerry Geran, Irving Small, Willard Rice, John Lyons, and Alphonse Lacroix. Justin McCarthy served as team captain. A dispute between athletic committee chairman Albert Geiger Jr. and head coach Ralph Winsor led to Winsor not returning. Alec Bright, Joe Stubbs, and Carl Stillman left the team in support of Winsor. Fred Rocque replaced Winsor while continuing to serve as Boston College's hockey coach.

The Unicorn began its season on December 9, 1922, with a 4–0 victory over the Boston Victorias. A week later, the B.A.A defeated the Montreal Nationals 3–0.

The Boston Athletic Association compiled a 9–1 record during the United States Amateur Hockey Association season and won the eastern title. They played the St. Paul Athletic Club in a best-of-five series for the league championship. They won the first two games, but dropped game three 2–1. On March 24, the B.A.A defeated St. Paul 2–1 to win the national amateur title.

Outside of league play, the B.A.A. defeated Harvard, lost to the Aura Lees and Boston College, and tied with the University of Toronto.

On April 14, 1923, the Boston Athletic Association hockey players were presented with gold watches at a banquet held at the club.

On October 29, 1923, the members of the United States Amateur Hockey Association voted to build the 1924 U.S. Olympic squad around the champion B.A.A. team. Five of the eleven Team USA players came from the B.A.A. roster (Alphonse Lacroix, John Lyons, Justin McCarthy, Willard Rice, and Irving Small).

=== 1923–24 ===
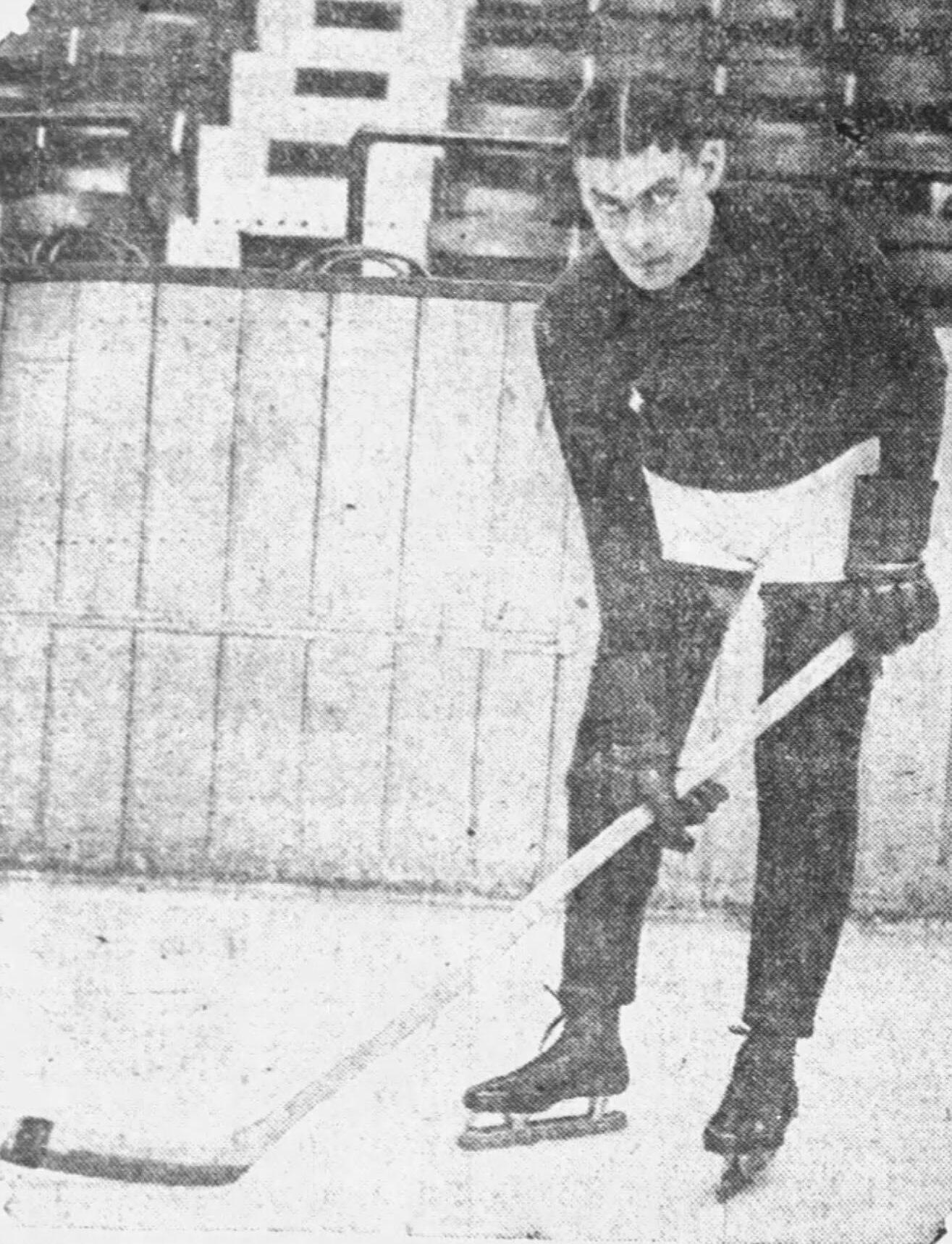
B.A.A. captain Justin McCarthy in 1923

McCarthy was reelected captain for the 1923–24 season. He, Small, Geran, Enright, Campbell, Smith, Lyons, Rice, and LaCroix returned while Jim Healey (Victorias), Hago Harrington (Melrose High School), Len Morrissey (Boston College), Hugh Nickle (MIT), and Tubber Cronin (Cambridge High and Latin School) joined this year. When McCarthy left the team to play in the Olympics, Ag Smith took over as captain. Head coach Fred Rocque left to Boston to become the head coach of the Minneapolis Millers and was replaced by former B.A.A. goaltender Skeets Canterbury.

The Unicorn started its season on December 8, 1923, with a 2–0 win over Boston's newest USAHA team – the Maple Athletic Association. On January 23, 1924, the B.A.A. and the Maple A.A. played to a 4–4 tie in what was the second longest game in U.S. amateur history. The two teams remained deadlocked after four overtime periods and under USAHA rules, the game was supposed to continue until a winner was decided. However, referee Ernie Doody ended the game at the request of Boston Arena management. On March 1, the B.A.A. clinched its third consecutive Eastern title with a 2–1 victory over the New Haven Bears. On March 12, the Unicorn defeated Boston College 3–1 to win the Winsor Cup.

The B.A.A. faced off against the Pittsburgh Yellow Jackets in a best-of-seven series for the league championship. Pittsburgh's roster included top Canadian amateur Lionel Conacher and U.S. Olympian Herb Drury. Pittsburgh won games one and two in Boston, but dropped game three 4–1. When the series moved to Pittsburgh for Game 4, Tubber Cronin was unable to join the team, as his studies at Boston College prevented him from traveling. The B.A.A. narrowly lost Game 4, but were blown out 6–1 in the deciding Game 5.

=== 1924–25 ===
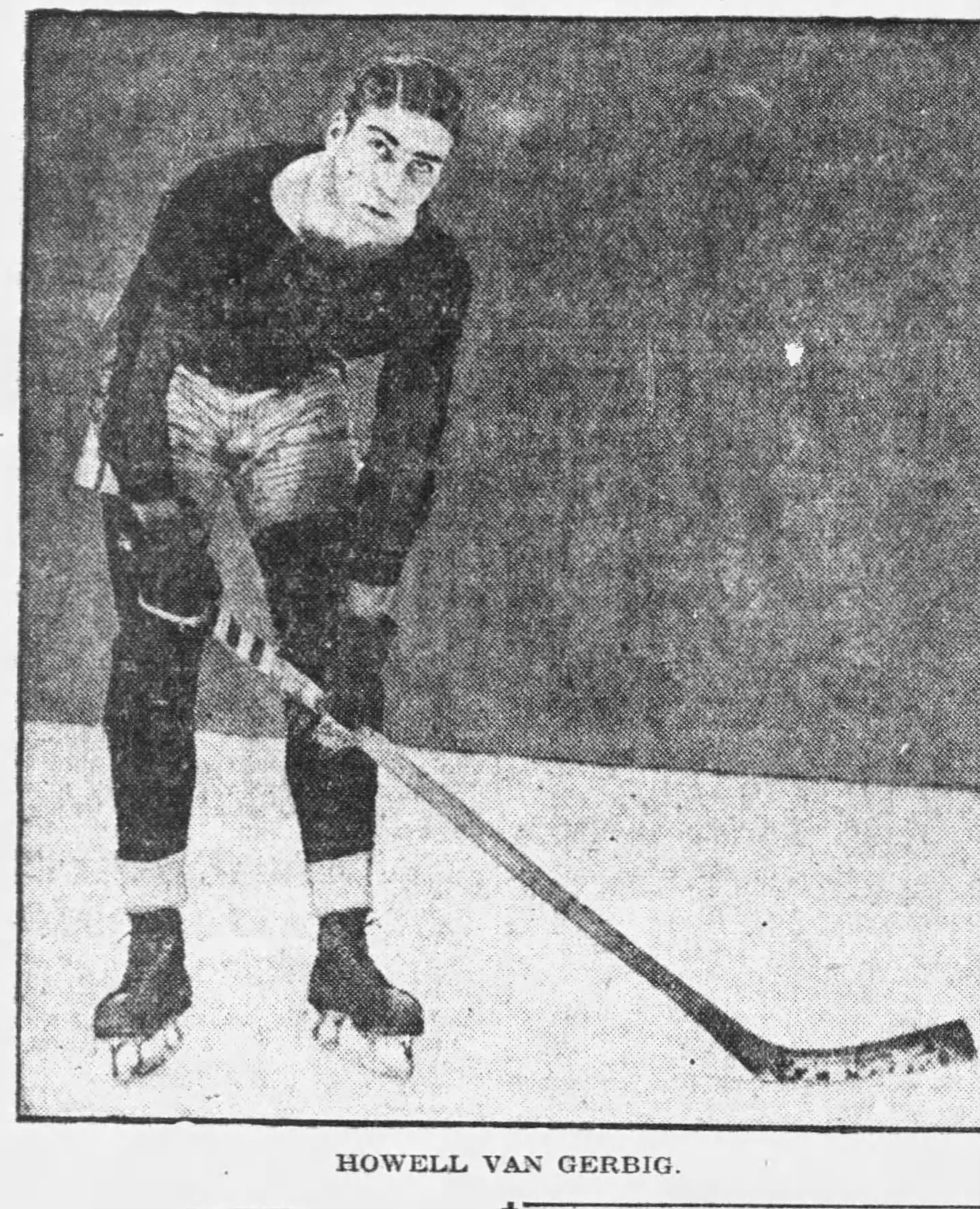
Howell Van Gerbig

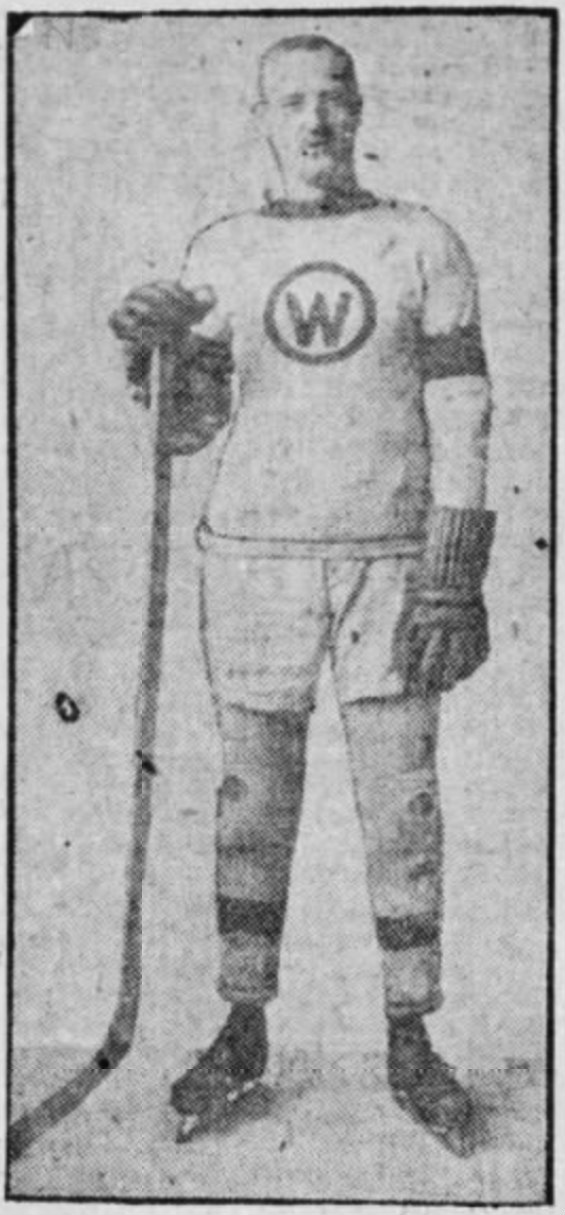
Irving Small as a member of the Westminsters

In November, The Boston Globe reported that Princeton star Howell Van Gerbig would replace Tubber Cronin, who had joined the B.C. hockey team, for the upcoming season.

During a January 17 game at the Duquesne Garden, Fort Pitt Hornet Joe Sills struck Boston Athletic Association player Leo Hughes in the eyes with his stick. Hughes' right eye was removed as a result, but doctors were able to save his left one. On January 20, B.A.A vice president George W. Wightman issued the following statement regarding Hughes' injury: "The governing committee of the Boston Athletic Association...deplores the rough tactics which it believes members of the Pittsburg team were permitted to employ in that game. Boston Athletic Association has undertaken to go through the 1924-1925 hockey season, but unless the officials of the United States A.H.A. put an immediate stop to unnecessary or wilful roughing in league hockey, the B.A.A. in the interest of clean sport, will withdraw its team from further league competition and will forthwith resign its membership in the United States Amateur Hockey Association." On February 9, the Unicorn played a testimonial game for Hughes against his alma mater, Boston College. The Eagles won the game 2–0, which raised $3,100 for Hughes.

The B.A.A was plagued with injuries throughout the season. The only player not to go to the hospital during the season was goaltender Alphonse Lacroix. Howell Van Gerbig suffered an injury to his cheek during the same game Hughes lost his eye that doctors recommended he sit out the team's next game against Fort Pitt, which he refused to do. Van Gerbig was eventually convinced by his mother to sit out the remainder of the regular season, however he returned for the Eastern championship series against the Hornets. Irving Small was knocked unconscious in a game against Berlin when defenseman Bill Sharpe hit him across the face with his stick in retaliation for hooking.

As players were leaving the ice after the February 13 game between the Boston Athletic Association and the Maple Athletic Association, Maple defenseman Clarence "Brick" Morrison skated across the ice and jumped on the neck of B.A.A's Irving Small. Players and spectators crowded the pair and police intervened to separate the two.

The B.A.A. and Hornets faced off in a best-of-three series for the eastern championship. Boston won the first game 1–0. The Hornets won Game 2 in Pittsburgh 6–1. Small was unable to play due to injury and Van Gerbig left the game due to an injured shoulder. Small and Van Gerbig missed game three, which was won by Fort Pitt 3–1.

On April 7, 1925, the athletic committee of the Boston Athletic Association unanimously voted to withdraw from the United States Amateur Hockey Association. B.A.A. athletic committee chairman Elbert Geiger stated that he did not believe the league was doing enough to uphold amateurism. The B.A.A. also voted to dismiss all of the hockey players from the association due to rumors that they were receiving money.

In May 1925, Irving Small sued the New Boston Arena Company, claiming that the company owed him $1,000 in salary for playing for the B.A.A. According to Small, members of the B.A.A. team were paid as much as $2,500 a year by Arena management, which hid the payments in secret locations throughout the building. Small dropped the case on May 22, 1925, after the two sides agreed to an out-of-court settlement.

== Eastern Amateur Hockey League ==
=== 1925–26 ===
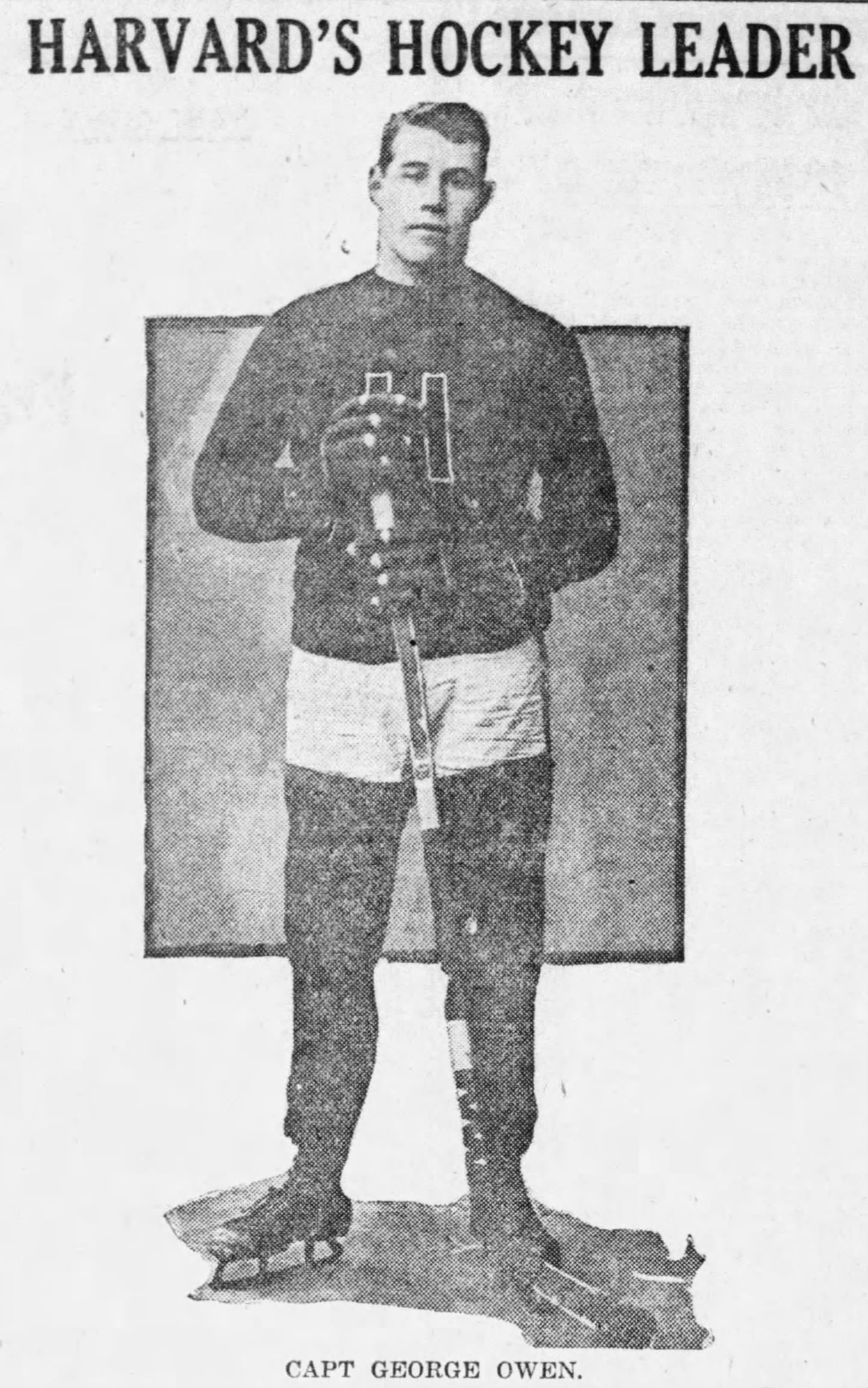
George Owen Jr.

On November 30, 1925, the B.A.A, Pere Marquette, St. Nicholas, New York Athletic Club, and New York Knickerbocker Club formed the Eastern Amateur Hockey League. William F. Garcelon was named league president, George Owen Sr. was chosen to serve as secretary–treasurer, and Ralph Hornblower, Rudolph von Bernuth, and Alfred Winsor were elected to the board of governors. von Bernuth replaced Garcelon as league president on December 16. Hornblower and Harry Cox were elected vice presidents at the same meeting and Owen was retained as secretary–treasurer.

The new B.A.A. team included George Owen Jr., Jack Hutchinson, Johnny Martin, Buck Dumaine, Art Langley, Bub Eaton, and Clark Hodder.

The EAHL began play on December 19, 1925. The Unicorn defeated St. Nicholas 2–0 and Pere Marquette beat the New York Athletic Club 7–1 in a doubleheader at the Boston Arena. On December 27, the Unicorn traveled to Madison Square Garden, where they beat the New York A.C. 5–2 before a crowd of 6,000 in a doubleheader that also featured the Knickerbockers and St. Nicholas.

The Unicorn and Pere Marquette finished atop the league standings and on March 23, 1926, the teams announced that the league championship would be decided in a two-game series that would be played as part of a double bill with the Boston Bruins and Portland Rosebuds. The B.A.A. won game one 3–1 and game two ended in a tie, which gave the league title to the Unicorn on goal differential.

The EAHL folded after one season and the B.A.A. did not field a team in 1926. Many of the Unicorn players joined the University Club team.

== Revivals ==
In 1928, the B.A.A. returned to the ice to play a schedule of games against club and college teams. The Unicorn defeated the Pleon Yacht Club 9–2 in its first game back from hiatus. The B.A.A tied with Boston University, then dropped their next two games to Harvard and Boston College. On February 12, the Unicorns came back from a 3–1 deficit to beat Harvard 6–4 in overtime. The B.A.A then lost 5–1 to the University Club in the feature event of the American Legion ice carnival at the Boston Garden. The two teams faced off at the Garden again a week later and the University Club won 9–5. The Unicorn defeated Boston University 3–1 in their final game of the season.

The Unicorn revived its hockey program again in 1946 and won that season's New England Amateur Athletic Union championship. The Boston Athletic Association lost the National A.A.U. hockey championship to the Hanover Indians 6–2 at the Rhode Island Auditorium.
