= Patsy Séguin =

Canadian ice hockey player

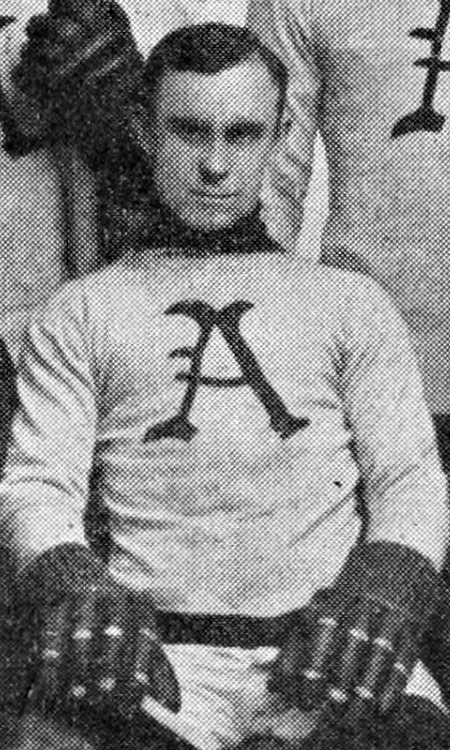
- Patsy Séguin with the Boston Arenas in the 1914–15 season.
- Born: May 2, 1887 Montreal, Quebec, Canada
- Died: August 8, 1918 (aged 31) Amiens, France
- Height: 5 ft 5 in (165 cm)
- Weight: 130 lb (59 kg; 9 st 4 lb)
- Position: Left wing
- Shot: Left
- Played for: Montreal Nationals; Montreal Canadiens; Halifax Crescents; Boston Arenas; New York Irish-Americans
- Playing career: 1908–1917

Joseph Alexandre "Patsy" Séguin (May 2, 1887 – August 8, 1918) was a Canadian professional ice hockey player. He played two games with the Montreal Canadiens of the National Hockey Association in the inaugural 1910 season, and scored one goal for the club. He was killed in action while serving in World War I in the Battle of Amiens.

== Playing style ==
Séguin was a small player in stature who liked to play rough and mix it up with his opponents on the ice. In 1912 Edgar Dey of the Halifax Socials was fined $50 by Halifax magistrate's court in Nova Scotia for assaulting Séguin in a January 5 MPHL game. Dey himself died the following month on February 13 from chest injuries thought to have stemmed partly from his tussle with Séguin.
