= 1949–50 1re série season =

French professional ice hockey season

The 1949–50 1re série season was the 29th season of the 1re série, the top level of ice hockey in France. Five teams participated in the league, and Racing Club de France won their first championship.

== First round ==
=== Paris Group ===
	Club
1.	Racing Club de France
2.	Lions de Paris

=== Alpes Group ===
	Club
1.	Chamonix Hockey Club
2.	Ours de Villard-de-Lans
3.	Diables Rouges de Briançon

== Final round ==
	Club	GP	W	T	L	GF	GA	Pts
1.	Racing Club de France	3	2	1	0	21	5	5
2.	Lions de Paris	3	1	2	0	18	6	4
3.	Chamonix Hockey Club	3	1	1	1	6	8	3
4.	Ours de Villard-de-Lans	3	0	0	3	4	30	0
