= 1943–44 1re série season =

French professional ice hockey season

The 1943–44 1re série season was the 26th season of the 1re série, the top level of ice hockey in France. Chamonix Hockey Club won their 10th championship.

== Final ==
- Chamonix Hockey Club - Racing Club de France 5:0 (1:0, 3:0, 1:0)
