= Skeets Canterbury =

American athlete and coach

Biographical details
- Born: February 25, 1878; Boston, Massachusetts, U.S.
- Died: June 2, 1954 (aged 76); Weymouth, Massachusetts, U.S.
- Education: Harvard College

Playing career

Hockey
- 1898–1901: Harvard
- 1906–1907: Brae Burn
- 1910–1911: Boston Hockey Club
- 1911–1914: Boston A.A.
- Position: Forward/Goaltender

Coaching career (HC unless noted)

Hockey
- 1913–1941: Harvard (Goalies)
- 1923–1926: Boston A.A.
- 1942: Harvard (Asst.)
- 1942–43: Harvard (Freshman/JV)

George Wood Canterbury (February 25, 1878 – June 2, 1954) was an American ice hockey player and coach for the Harvard Crimson men's ice hockey team.

== Early life ==
Canterbury was born in Boston on February 25, 1878, to William Headly and Helen Homer (Pierce) Canterbury. He prepared for college at the Hopkinson School in Boston.

== Playing ==
During his youth, Canterbury played shinny on Hammond and Jamaica Ponds. At the Hopkinson School, Canterbury played another informal version of hockey known as ice polo. From 1898 to 1901, Canterbury was a forward on the Harvard hockey team. Canterbury graduated from Harvard College in 1901, but continued to play amateur hockey for the Brae Burn Country Club, Boston Hockey Club, and Boston Athletic Association. Early on in his amateur career, Canterbury was asked to fill-in as goaltender and remained in that position until his retirement in 1914.

== Coaching ==
Canterbury began coaching Harvard's goaltenders in 1913. He replaced Fred Rocque as the head coach of the Boston Athletic Association hockey team in 1923 and remained with the club until it folded after the 1925–26 season. In 1941, Canterbury was replaced on the Harvard coaching staff by Fred V. Maloon Jr. On January 15, 1942, Harvard athletic director W. J. Bingham fired Maloon and head coach Clark Hodder after several members of the hockey team caused a disturbance during a Christmas trip to Lake Placid, New York. John Chase was brought in to replace Hodder and Canterbury returned as assistant coach. During the 1942–43 season, Canterbury was the freshman and junior varsity coach while also instructing the goaltenders.

== Automobile sales ==
In 1906, Canterbury began a career in automobile sales with the Harry Fosdick Company. From 1907 to 1914, he sold Stevens-Duryea cars for the J. W. Bowman Company. In 1914, he formed George W. Canterbury Inc., which served as the New England agency for the Simplex Automobile Company. In 1920, the company became the eastern New England distributor for Stevens-Duryea and moved from Boylston Street to Commonwealth Avenue. That year, George W. Canterbury Inc. ran the Stevens-Duryea and Brewster & Co. exhibitions at the Boston Auto Show. By 1922, Canterbury was a Winton dealer. In 1923, he formed the Boston Overland Company and began selling Willys–Overland and Willys-Knight vehicles. In 1928, his dealership closed and he joined C. E. Fay Co. as a special representative. He left the following year to become a branch manager for Duesenberg.

== Personal life ==
On June 8, 1908, Canterbury married Adelaide Merrill Gay in Brookline, Massachusetts. They had two sons (George Jr. and William) as well as a daughter (Gertrude) who died at the age of two. The family lived in Brookline, but later moved to Hingham, Massachusetts, where Canterbury was the harbormaster for many years. Canterbury died on June 2, 1954, at South Shore Hospital.

== Canterbury Society ==
In the 1930s, Harvard goaltender Dave Mittell created the Canterbury Society, an informal social club for past and present Harvard goalies which he named in honor of the school's longtime coach. The society sponsored the George W. Canterbury Award, which was presented annually to the top goaltender in the Ivy League.
