= 1962–63 1re série season =

French professional ice hockey season

The 1962–63 1re série season was the 42nd season of the 1re série, the top level of ice hockey in France. Eight teams participated in the first round, and Chamonix Hockey Club won their 19th league title.

== First round ==
=== Paris ===
	Club	Pts
1.	Athletic Club de Boulogne-Billancourt	12
2.	Lions de Paris	8
3.	Racing Club de France	4
4.	US Métro	0

=== Alpes ===
	Club	GP	W	T	L	GF	GA	Pts
1.	Chamonix Hockey Club	6	5	0	1	50	12	10
2.	Gap Hockey Club	6	4	0	2	23	31	8
3.	Sporting Hockey Club Saint Gervais	6	3	0	3	32	26	6
4.	Ours de Villard-de-Lans	6	0	0	6	3	39	0

== Final round ==
	Club	GP	W	T	L	GF	GA	Pts
1.	Chamonix Hockey Club	6	6	0	0	58	16	12
2.	Athletic Club de Boulogne-Billancourt	6	4	0	2	36	20	8
3.	Gap Hockey Club	5	1	0	4	13	42	2
4.	Lions de Paris	5	0	0	5	11	40	0
