= Westminster Hockey Club =

Westminster Hockey Club New Haven Bears
- City: Boston (1921–22); New Haven, Connecticut (1922–24); USA
- League: USAHA
- Operated: 1921–1924
- Home arena: Boston Arena (1921–22); New Haven Arena (1922–24)
- General manager: Charles Van Norman (1921–23); John Fillman (1923–24)
- Head coach: Eddie Powers (1921–22)
- Captain: Frank Downing (1921–22); Normand Shay (1922–24)

The Westminster Hockey Club (also known as the Westminsters or the Waiters) was an American amateur ice hockey team that played in the United States Amateur Hockey Association from 1921 to 1924. The team played its first season in Boston and won the 1922 USAHA championship. The team moved to New Haven, Connecticut for the 1922–23 season and, during that season, were kicked out of the league for failing to show up for a scheduled game. The Westminsters were then replaced by the New Haven Bears, which consisted of most of the same players as the Westminster Hockey Club, but had different management.

== Inaugural season in Boston ==
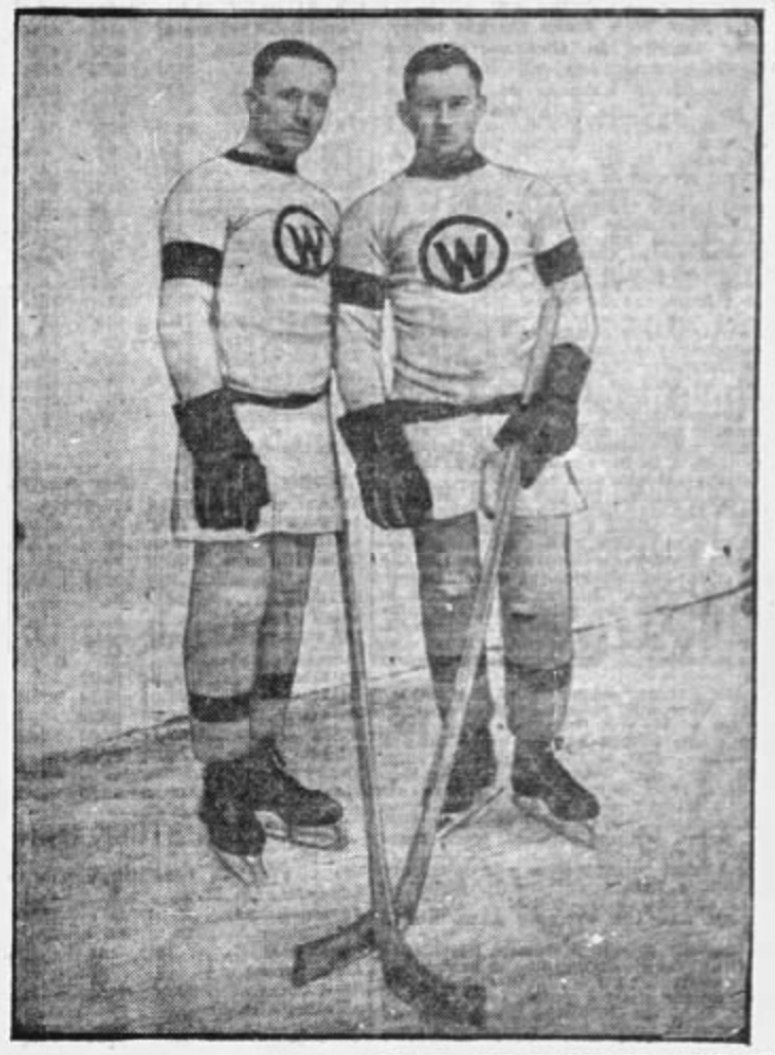
Shorty & Wilfred Veno

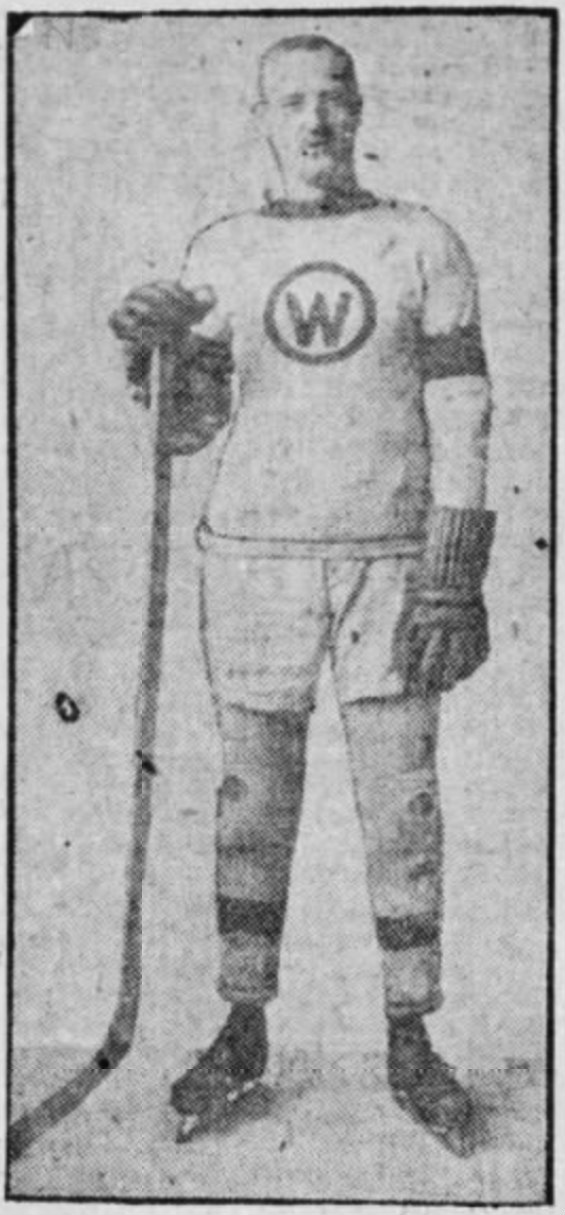
Irving Small

The Westminster Hockey Club was one of three admitted to the United States Amateur Hockey Association in 1921. The team almost exclusively consisted Canadian players. It was coached by Eddie Powers and was captained by Frank Downing. The roster included brothers Shorty & Wilfred Veno, Irving Small, Ag Smith, Herb Rhéaume, Dinty Moore, Normand Shay, and Phil Rudolph. Almost immediately after joining the USAHA, the club's amateur status was challenged. Club president Emile Conlon publicly refuted rumors that the team's Canadian players were ineligible to play in the USAHA.

Before the start of the season, a four-team tournament was held to determine which three Boston teams would make the league. The Westminsters defeated Pere Marquette 4–3 in double overtime, beat the Boston Athletic Association 2–1, and shutout the Melrose Hockey Club 4–0 to secure a spot in the league. The Westminsters finished the regular season with a 6–2 record. They clinched the eastern title on February 25, 1922, with a 14–0 victory over the St. Nicholas Hockey Club.

The Westminster Hockey Club faced the St. Paul Saints in a three-game series to decide the league championship. The Westminsters won game one 3–0. Irving Small, Shorty Veno, and Francis Downing scored the goals and goaltender Herb Rhéaume recorded the shutout. Game two ended in a scoreless tie after three overtime periods. Prior to game three, it was decided that game two would count as a half victory for each time. The Westministers won game three 2–0 to win the United States' amateur hockey championship.

The Westministers sought to play that year's Canadian amateur champions, the Toronto Granites, but only one Granite player, Dunc Munro, accepted the challenge. Munro instead former a team with junior and industrial league players known as the Toronto Invaders that lost two games to the Westminster Hockey Club.

== Move to New Haven ==
In September 1922, the Westminster Hockey Club moved to New Haven, Connecticut after the team reached an with the agreement with the Yale Athletic Association to lease the New Haven Arena.

Prior to the January 23, 1923 game against the Boston Athletic Association, Wesminsters manager Charles Van Norman informed USAHA president William S. Haddock that the team would not take the ice unless they received certificates of standing for Canadian players they wanted to add to the roster. Haddock told Van Norman that the certificates would not be approved until the USAHA received information from the Canadian Amateur Hockey Association and if the Westminster Hockey Club did not take the ice, the team would be "barred forever". On orders from the team's sponsor, Francis J. Sullivan, the team did not travel to Boston for the scheduled game and were expelled from the league three days later. On January 30, Sullivan and Van Norman announced they were leaving the Westminster Hockey Club, citing not the team's expulsion, but rather the arrest of two players (Normand Shay and Lorn Armstrong), as the reason for their departure. That same day, a group of New Haven businessmen led by John Fillman organized to form a new team, known as the New Haven Bears to take the Westminsters' place in the USAHA. On February 1, the USAHA approved Fillman's application to join the league. The Westminsters and Bears had a combined record of 6–3, putting them in a tie for second place with the Boston Hockey Club.

Prior to the 1923–24 season, the Bears added three Canadian players – Arthur Veno, Ted Behan, and Vincent Heaney. That same offseason, the St. Nicholas Hockey Club of New York City withdrew from the league, leaving New Haven as the only non-Boston team in the eastern group. New Haven finished the season with a 6–6 record, once again putting them in a tie for second place with the Boston Hockey Club.

The New Haven Arena was damaged by a fire in June 1924, which left the team without a venue to play in. The team disbanded and USAHA dissolved a year later.
