= Boston Arenas =

American amateur ice hockey team

- City: Boston, Massachusetts; USA
- League: Boston City Hockey League 1915–16; American Amateur Hockey League 1916–17
- Home arena: Boston Arena (now Matthews Arena)
- Colors: Red, White
- Head coach: Fred Rocque

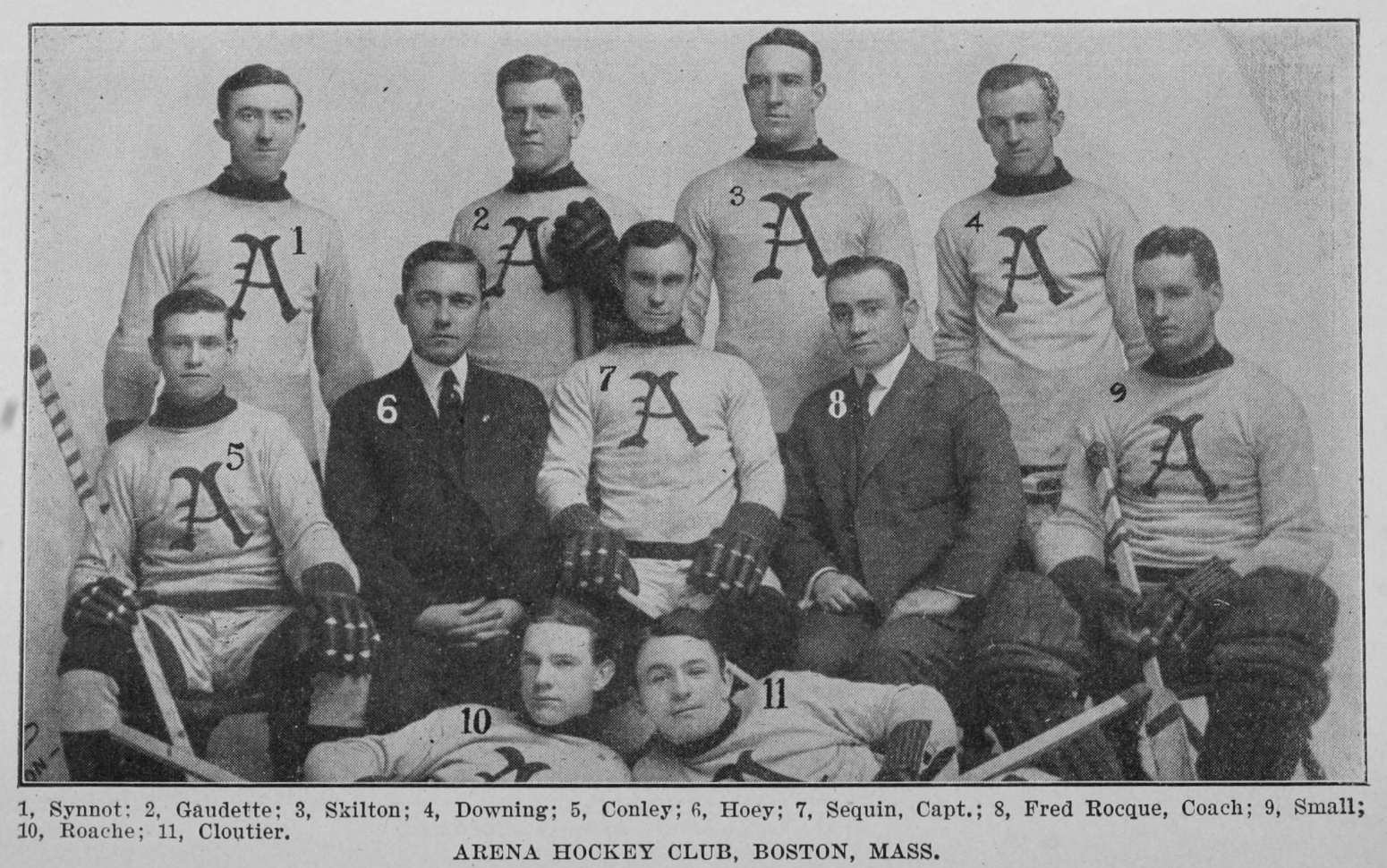
Boston Arenas in 1914–15. At left in the top row (1) is Frank Synott. Sitting in the middle (7) is Patsy Séguin. Raymie Skilton (3) is standing third from left in the top row and Mickey Roach (10) is lying at left beneath the front row. Both Skilton and Roach would later play in the National Hockey League.

The Boston Arena Hockey Club, colloquially known as the Boston Arenas, were an American amateur ice hockey team from Boston, Massachusetts. The Boston Arenas played its home games at the Boston Arena (now Matthews Arena) at 238 St. Botolph Street in Boston.

== History ==
The Boston Arenas played exhibition games in 1914–15, and in 1915–16 the club played in the Boston City Hockey League. For the 1916–17 season the club joined the American Amateur Hockey League where it played against its main city rival the Boston Athletic Association, as well as against two teams from New York City: the Brooklyn Crescents and the New York Irish-Americans. In 1917–18 the club played in the United States National Hockey League (USNHL).

=== NHL alumni ===
- Raymie Skilton – Montreal Wanderers, one game in 1917–18
- Mickey Roach – Toronto St. Pats, Hamilton Tigers, New York Americans, 1919–1927
