= Racing Club de France (ice hockey) =

Disbanded ice hockey team in France

- City: Paris, France
- Founded: 1931; 95 years ago
- Dissolved: 1963; 63 years ago
- Colours: Sky blue White

Franchise history
- 1931–1963: Racing Club de France

Racing Club de France was an ice hockey team in Paris, France. They were a member of the Racing Club de France sports association.

== History ==
The club first participated in the 1re série during the 1931-32 season. They lost to Stade Français in the final, 3–2 in overtime. The following season, Racing Club was again defeated by Stade Français in the final, this time by a score of 1–0. The club again played in the final in the 1943-44 season, but were shutout by Chamonix Hockey Club, 5–0. In the 1949-50 season, Racing Club won their first French championship, a feat they would accomplish again the following season. Their last appearance in the 1re série was in the 1962-63 season.

== Honours ==
- 1re Série (2): 1949–50, 1950–51
