= 1921–22 French Ice Hockey Championship =

The 1921–22 French Ice Hockey Championship was the eighth edition of the French Ice Hockey Championship, the national ice hockey championship in France. Club des Sports d'Hiver de Paris won their first championship.

== Final ==
- Chamonix Hockey Club - Club des Sports d’Hiver de Paris 2:6 (1:2, 1:4)
