= United States National Hockey League =

Amateur ice hockey league active in 1918

- Countries: United States
- Region: Northeast
- Founded: 1918
- Folded: 1918
- No. of teams: 4
- Most successful club: Pittsburgh Athletic Association (1 title)

The United States National Hockey League (or National Amateur Hockey League) was an amateur ice hockey league that operated in Boston, New York City and Pittsburgh for one season in early 1918.

== History ==
The league consisted of the New York Wanderers, Pittsburgh Athletic Association, Boston Arenas and a team representing the Boston Navy Yard. It formed in January 1918 after the American Amateur Hockey League, in which New York and Boston teams had previously participated, failed to survive the player shortages of World War I. Each team was scheduled to play each of the other teams four times (twice home and twice away, except when the two Boston teams played each other at their shared home rink).

The Pittsburgh Athletic Association won its first ten games to clinch the league title. The team thus earned the right to face the holders of the Art Ross Cup in a three-game international championship series. Pittsburgh defeated the Montreal Hochelaga club in that series to claim a new honor called the Fellowes International Trophy.

At one point during the season, the league's governing body, the International Skating Union of America, was hopeful that the circuit would not only return for the following winter but also expand to Cleveland, Detroit, and possibly Chicago and New Haven. The outlook turned grim in the off-season, as a war effort to divert use of ammonia from ice rink operations to munitions production led to expectations of prolonged rink closures. Suspension of the league was all but ensured as St. Nicholas Arena in New York was leased out for roller skating and dancing, Pittsburgh's Duquesne Garden was given over for use as a barracks, and the Boston Arena burned down. The league never returned before a new national amateur league was created in 1920 under the governance of the United States Amateur Hockey Association.

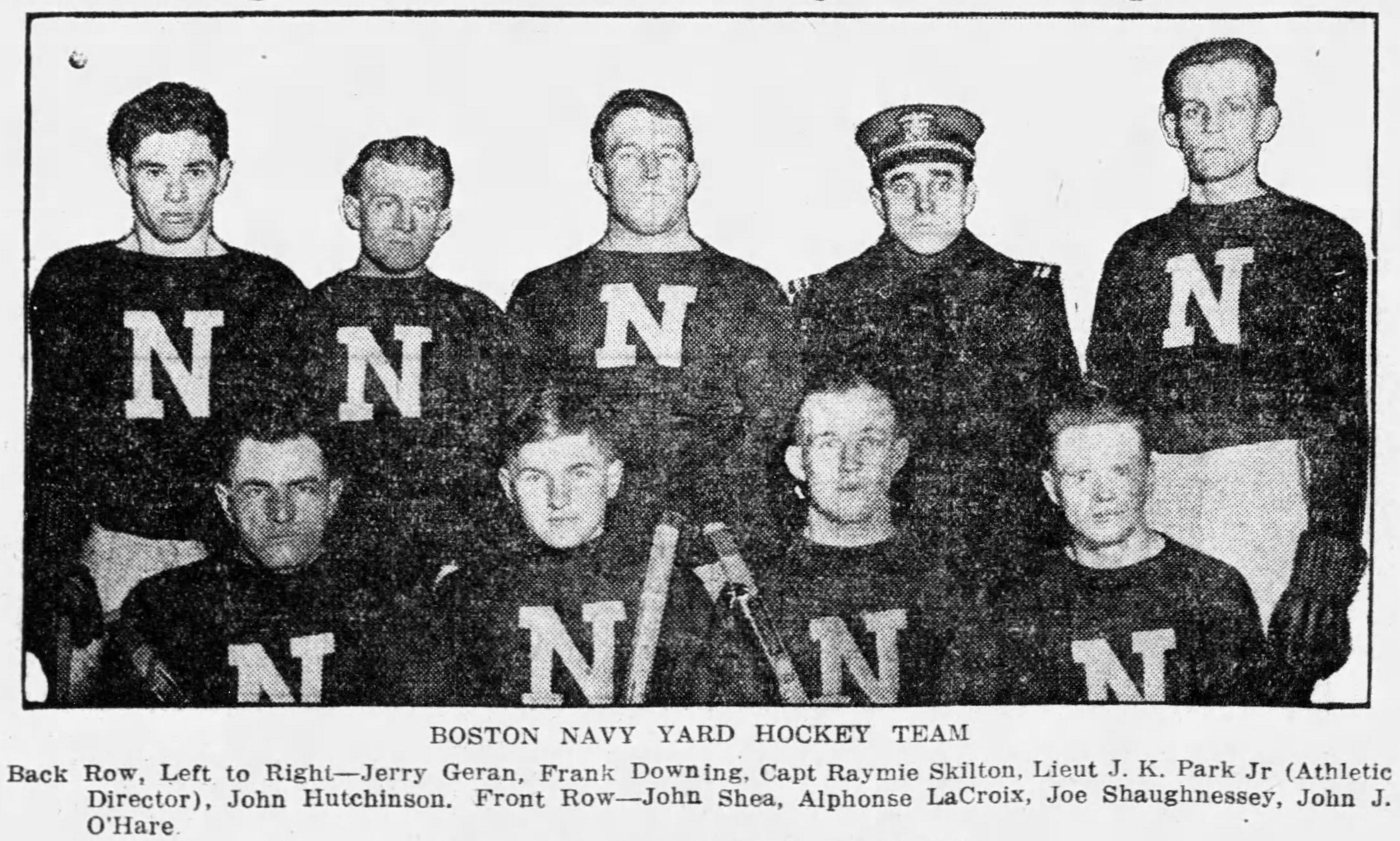
Boston Navy Yard team

=== Final standings ===
GP = Games Played, W = Wins, L = Losses, T = Ties, GF = Goals For, GA = Goals Allowed

Team	GP	W	L	T	GF	GA
Pittsburgh Athletic Association	12	10	2	0	48	26
Boston Navy Yard	11	7	4	0	41	22
New York Wanderers	10	3	7	0	28	42
Boston Arenas	11	2	9	0	15	42
