= United States Amateur Hockey Association =

Ice hockey governing body in the U.S.

- Founded: 1920
- Folded: 1930
- Replaced by: American Hockey Association
- No. of teams: 8 to 15
- Country: United States

The United States Amateur Hockey Association (USAHA) was an ice hockey governing body in the United States from 1920 to 1930, which operated an amateur league from 1920 to 1925. The league was filled with predominantly Canadian-born players, but struggled to achieve consistent attendance figures in the days before large arenas with artificial ice. The league disbanded in 1925, with some teams eventually joining the American Hockey Association, and one team joining the National Hockey League. It continued as a governing body until 1930, when its responsibilities were assumed by the Amateur Athletic Union.

== History ==
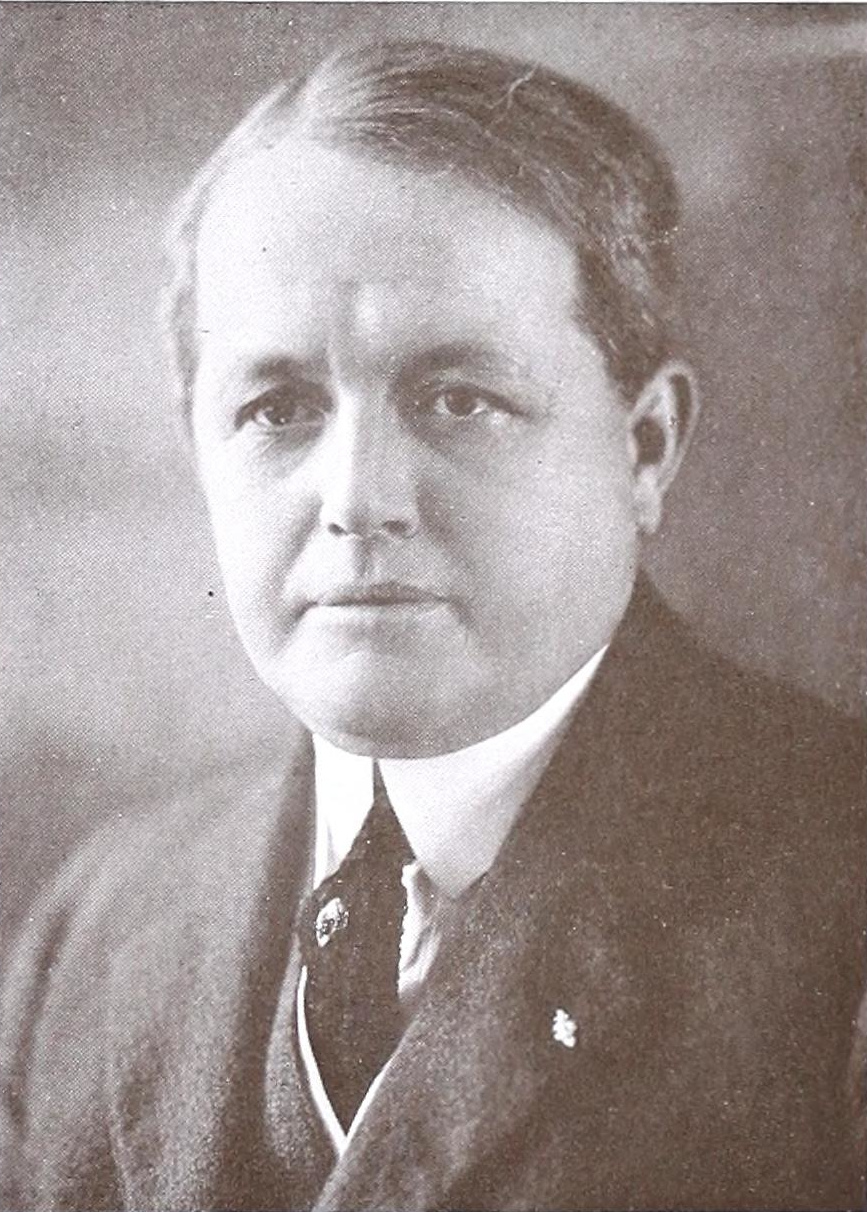
USAHA president William S. Haddock

The United States Amateur Hockey Association (USAHA) was founded on October 25, 1920 in Philadelphia. The International Skating Union of America which had governed ice hockey until then, resolved to turn over control of the sport with the approval of the Amateur Athletic Union (AAU). The USAHA also inherited the existing affiliation agreement with the Canadian Amateur Hockey Association (CAHA), which allowed teams from the USAHA to play against teams in either the AAU or the CAHA.

William S. Haddock from Pittsburgh was elected the first president of the USAHA. The original eight teams in the USAHA included the Pittsburgh Yellow Jackets, and teams from Boston, Cleveland, New York City, Philadelphia, and three from Minnesota including Duluth, Eveleth, and Saint Paul. Later additions were the Boston Athletic Association, the Fort Pitt Hornets, Milwaukee, Minneapolis, and three transfers from the American Amateur Hockey Association which included teams from Calumet, Houghton and Sault Ste. Marie, Michigan. The USAHA divided its team into three divisions for the first two seasons, with teams grouped in the east, the mid-west and northwest. From 1922 onward, the association was grouped into eastern and western divisions.

In 1922, an annual post-season series was arranged for the USAHA champion to play the senior hockey champion of the CAHA for the Hamilton B. Wills Trophy, but no such series was played for various reasons. In 1923, the USAHA and the CAHA negotiated an agreement to govern the migration of senior hockey players between the associations. Persistent disagreements on player movements between the USAHA and the CAHA, led to CAHA president Silver Quilty cancelling the agreement in 1925. The USAHA stopped league play after the 1924–25 season. The Pittsburgh Yellow Jackets joined the National Hockey League, and the western teams were reorganized as the Central Hockey League in 1925, which later became the American Hockey Association in 1926.

The association had faced difficulties with consistent refereeing, and the lack of suitable ice for the whole season since most teams played on natural outdoor ice surfaces instead of arenas. The Minneapolis Arena, and the Duquesne Garden in Pittsburgh were the largest rinks at the time. The association also struggled with attendance figures due to the varying arena capacities.

Although league play ceased in 1925, the USAHA continued to oversee amateur hockey in the United States, included United States Olympic hockey team. The USAHA selected the Augsburg College hockey team to represent the US at the 1928 Winter Olympics, however the American Olympic Committee, led by Douglas MacArthur, refused to certify the Augsburg team due to the lack of Olympic trials. Haddock insisted that the Augsburg team was the only one in the country that had the ability and the funds to compete in the Olympics and refused to approve any other team. As a result, the United States did not have an Olympic hockey team in 1928. In 1930, the USAHA was dissolved and the AAU took control of ice hockey.

== Teams ==
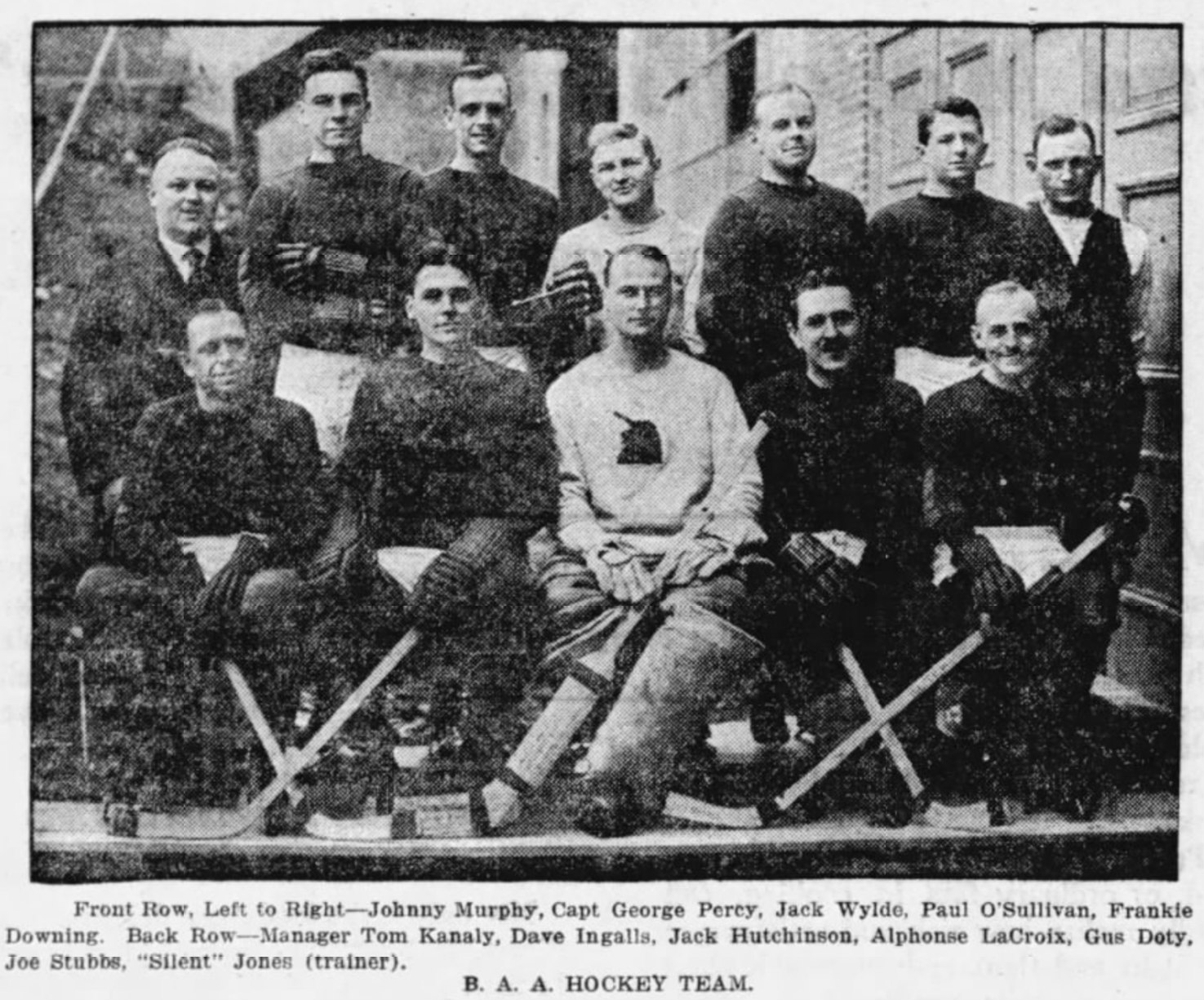
Boston Athletic Association team in 1920–21

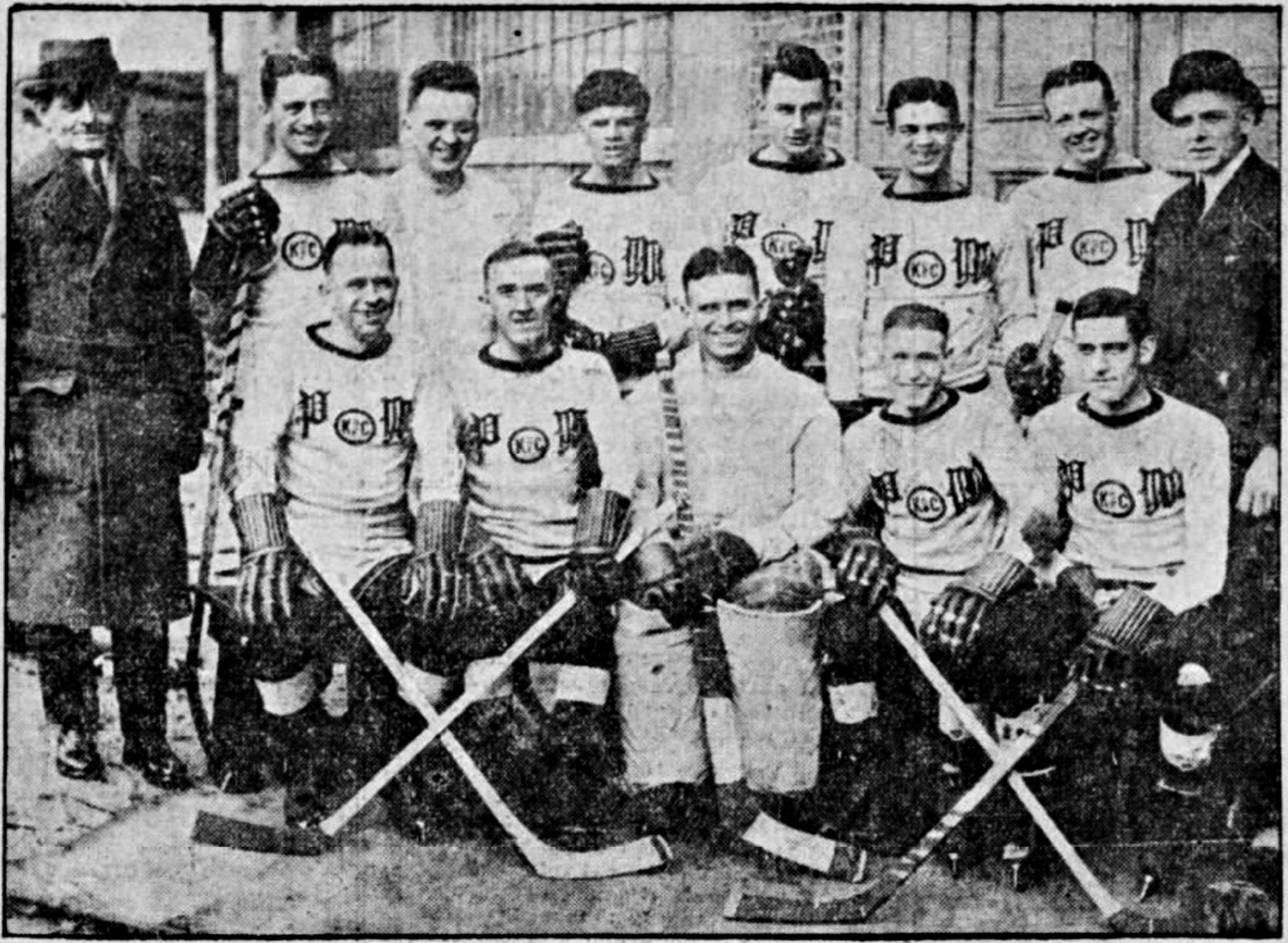
Boston Pere Marquette team in 1921–22 (Top row left to right: E. Anderson, Jim Healy, Frank Storey, Billy Roach, Alec Campbell, Bernie Healy, J. Collins (trainer), Spike Doran. Bottom row left to right: Johnny Murphy, Frank Synott, Arthur Donahue, Farrell Conley, Eddie Enright)

- Boston AA (1920–1925)
- Boston Hockey Club (1922–1925)
- Boston Maples (1923–1925)
- Boston Pere Marquette Knights of Columbus (1921–22)
- Boston Shoe Trades (1920–21)
- Boston Victorias (1922–23)
- Calumet HC (1920–1922)
- Canadian Soo Greyhounds (1920–1922)
- Cleveland Hockey Club (a.k.a. "Indians" or "Blues") (1920–1925)
- Duluth Hornets (1920–1925)
- Eveleth Reds (1920–1924)
  - Eveleth Arrowheads (1924–25)
- Fort Pitt Hornets (1924–25)
- Michigan Soo Wildcats (1920–1922)
- Milwaukee AC (1922–23)
- Minneapolis Millers (1923–24)
  - Minneapolis Rockets (1924–25)
- New York Canadian Club (1922–23)
- New York St. Nicholas (1920–1923)
- Philadelphia Quaker City (1920–1922)
- Pittsburgh Yellowjackets (1921–1925)
- Portage Lakes HC (1920–1922)
- St. Paul Athletic Club/Saints (1920–1925)
- Westminster Hockey Club (1921–23)
  - New Haven Bears (1923–24)

== Players ==
USAHA players were predominantly Canadians, with the St. Paul and Duluth teams being the exceptions. Rosters were typically small and ranged from nine to twelve players, and teams did not usually have an alternate goaltender.

Notable players from the USAHA include:

- Taffy Abel
- Nobby Clark
- Lionel Conacher
- Anthony Conroy
- Vic Desjardins
- Herb Drury
- Percy Galbraith
- Moose Goheen
- Magnus Goodman
- Ching Johnson
- Herbie Lewis
- Joseph McCormick
- Lawrence McCormick
- Mickey McGuire
- Hib Milks
- Muzz Murray
- Herb Rhéaume
- Eddie Rodden
- Jim Seaborn
- Raymie Skilton
- Art Somers
- Nels Stewart
- Tiny Thompson
- Vern Turner
- Flat Walsh
- Cooney Weiland
- Frank Winters
- Roy Worters

== Player gallery ==
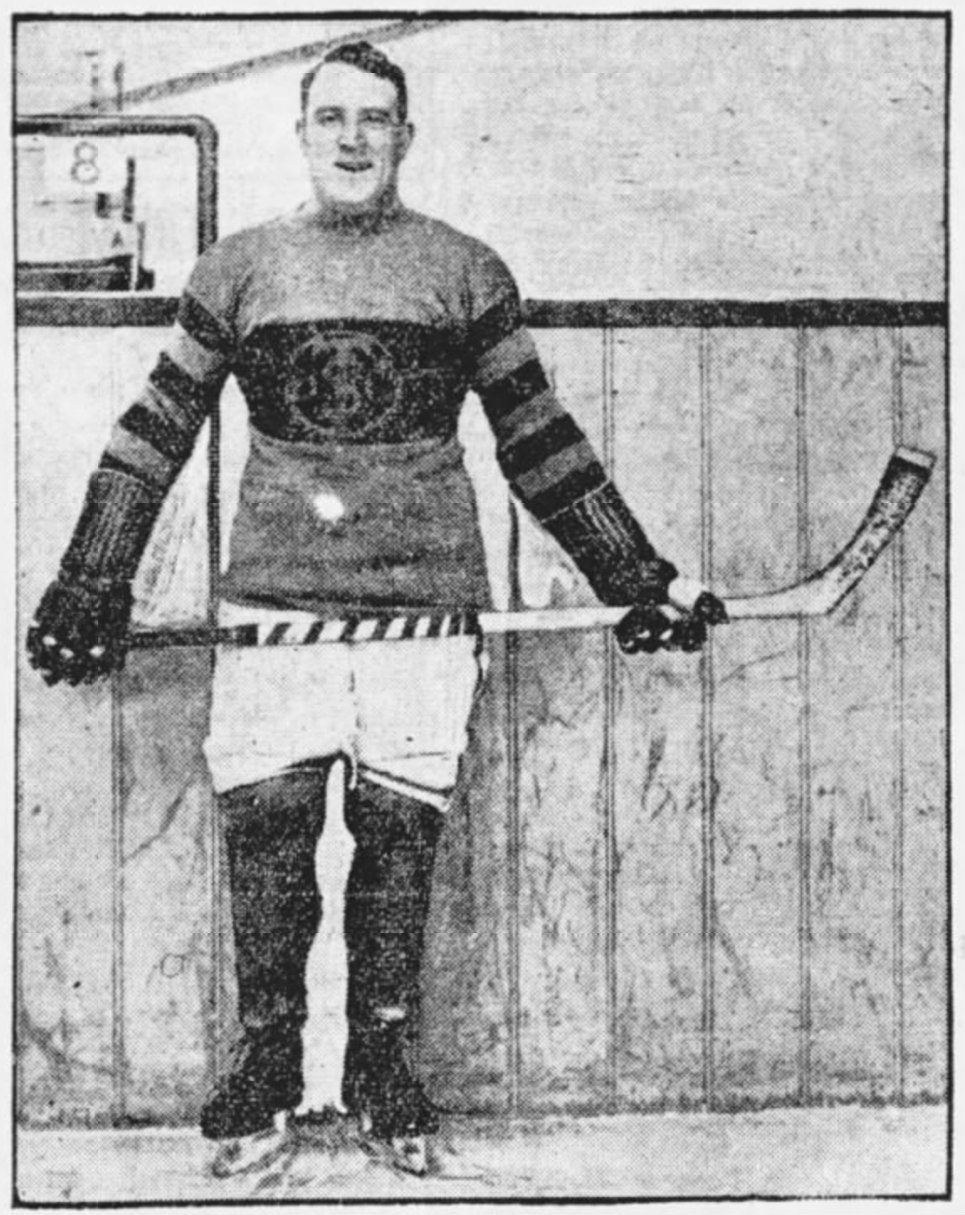
Raymie Skilton with the Boston Shoe Trades (1920–21)

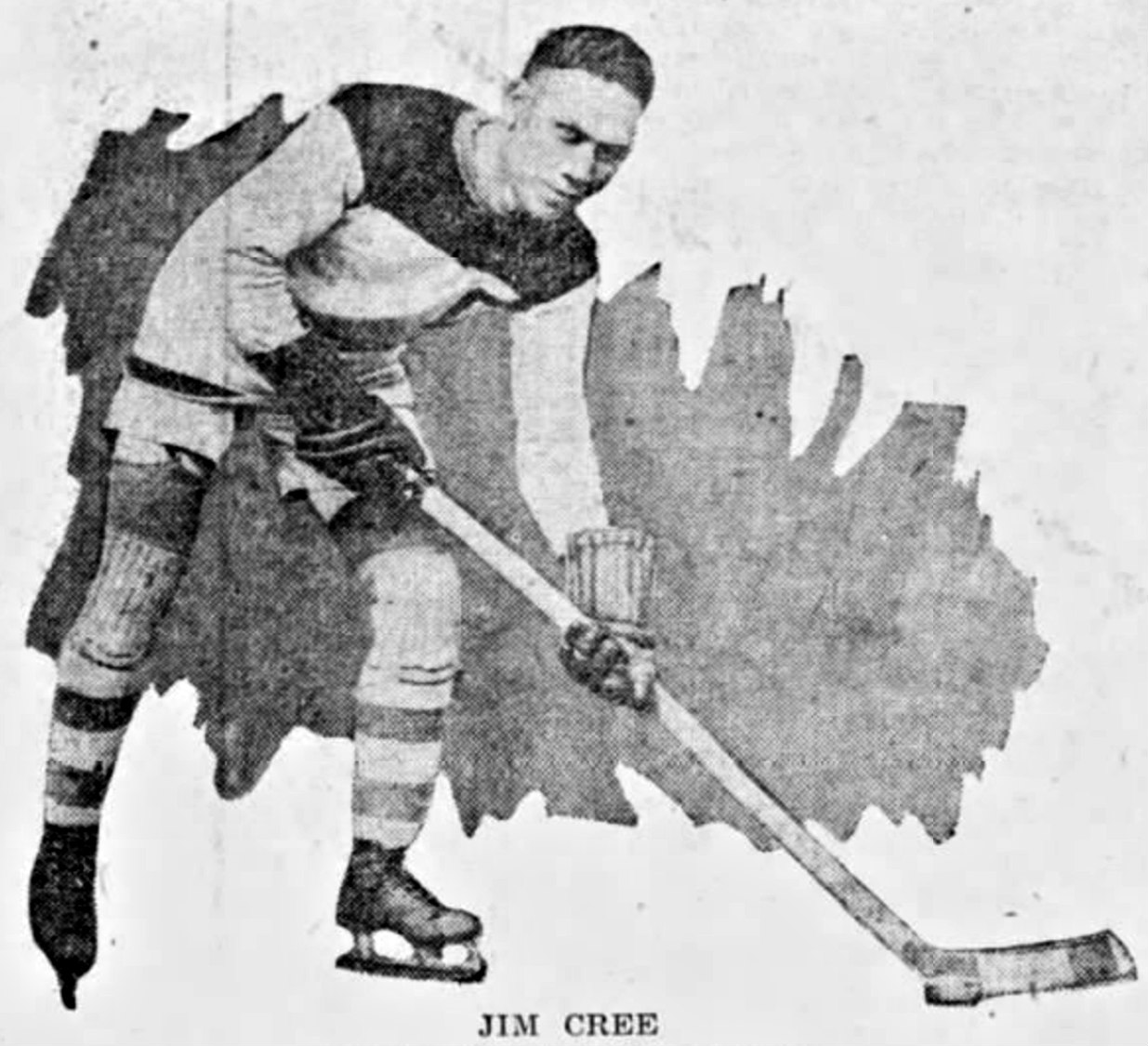
Jim Cree with the Cleveland Hockey Club (1920–21)

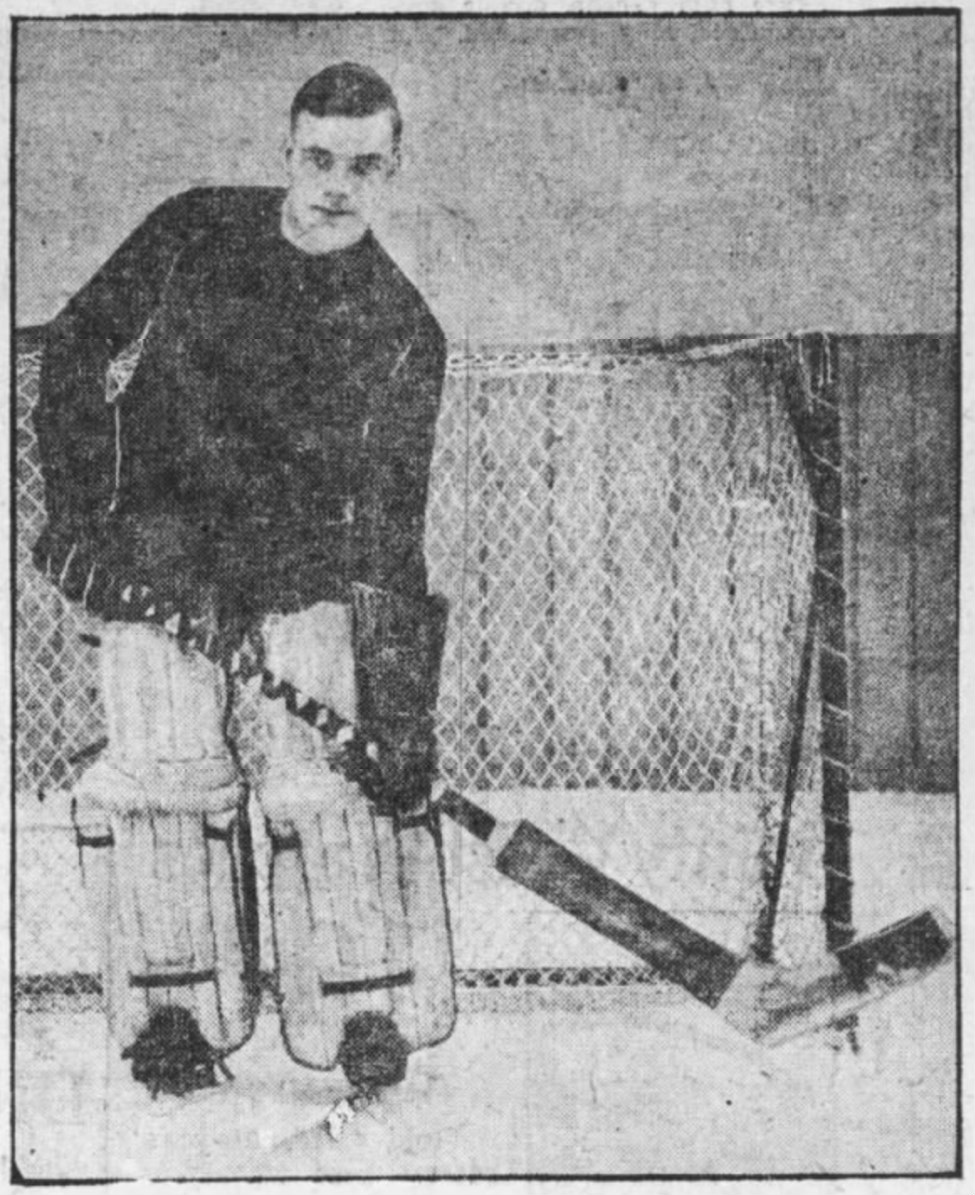
Herb Rhéaume with the Westminster Hockey Club (1921–22)

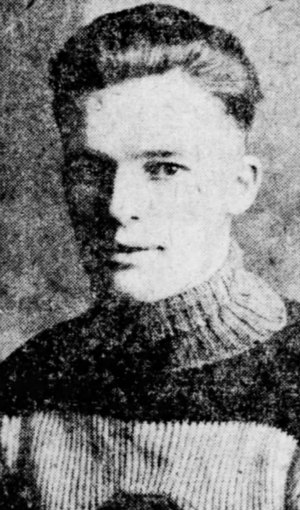
Nels Stewart with the Cleveland Hockey Club (1922–23)

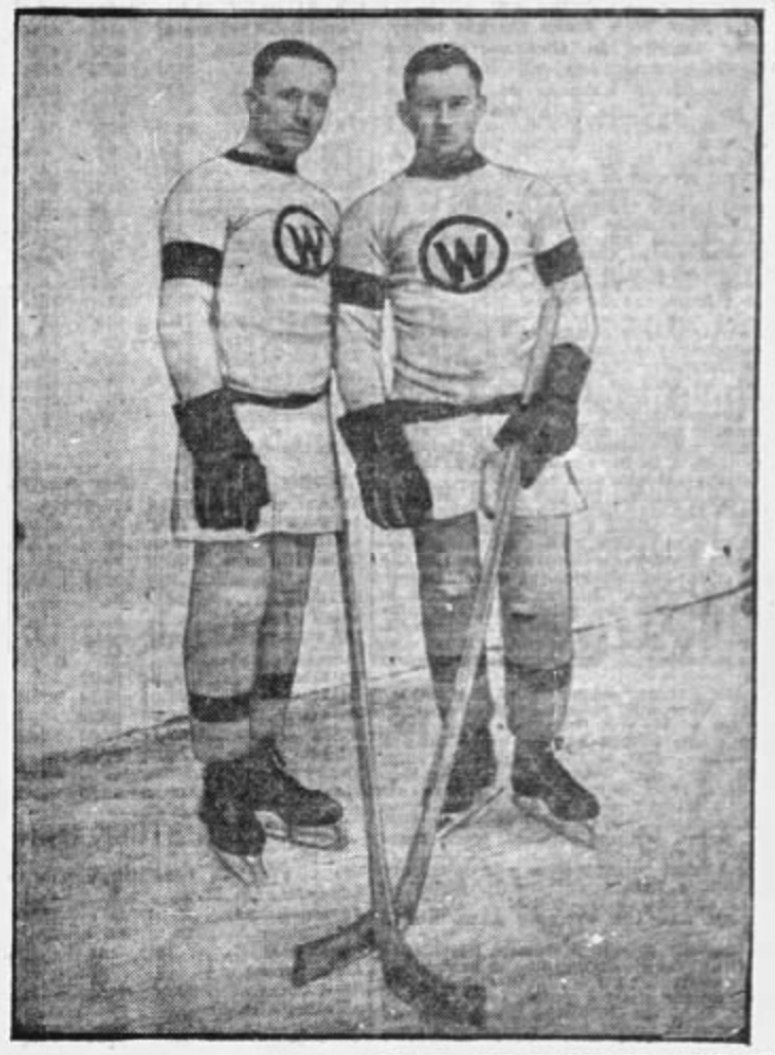
Shorty & Wilfred Veno with the Westminster Hockey Club (1921–22)

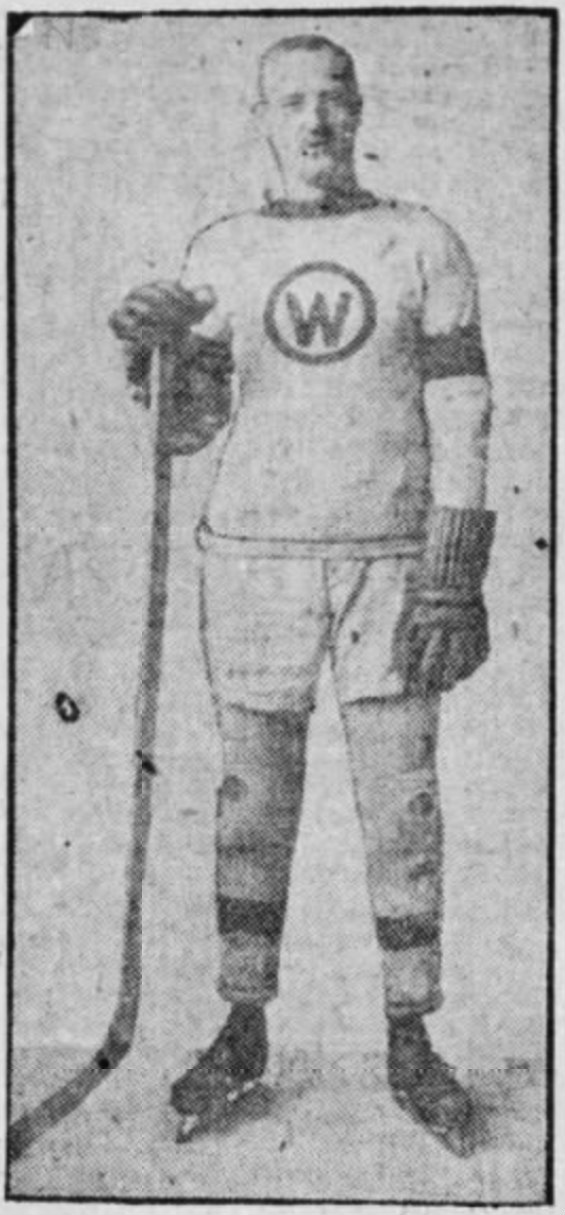
Irving Small with the Westminster Hockey Club (1921–22)

== Champions ==
United States Amateur Hockey Association regular season and playoff champions.

| Season | Regular season champions | Playoff champions |
|---|---|---|
| 1920–21 | Group One: Boston A.A. Group Two: Cleveland HC; Group Three: Eveleth | Cleveland HC (14-12 on total goals) |
| 1921–22 | Group One: Westminster Hockey Club; Group Two: St. Paul; Group Three: Canadian Soo* | Westminster Hockey Club |
| 1922–23 | Eastern division: Boston A.A. Western division: St. Paul | Boston Athletic Association |
| 1923–24 | Eastern division: Boston A.A. Western division: Pittsburgh Yellow Jackets | Pittsburgh Yellow Jackets |
| 1924–25 | Eastern division: Fort Pitt Hornets; Western division (1st half): Pittsburgh Yellow Jackets; Western division (2nd half): Eveleth | Pittsburgh Yellow Jackets |

*Canadian Soo was ineligible to compete for the U.S. championship, so group runner-up Eveleth entered the playoffs instead.
