= 1923–24 Boston College Eagles men's ice hockey season =

- Conference: Independent
- Home ice: Boston Arena

Record
- Overall: 7–10–1
- Home: 5–7–0
- Road: 1–0–0
- Neutral: 1–3–1

Coaches and captains
- Head coach: Charles Foote
- Captain: Jack Fitzgerald

The 1923–24 Boston College Eagles men's ice hockey season was the 7th season of play for the program. The Eagles were coached by Charles Foote in his 1st season.

== Season ==
After winning the program's first championship, Fred Rocque resigned as head coach. The school did not settle on his replacement until December when they brought in Charley Foote to be the new bench boss. While he had several returning players to rely upon, the team barely was able to get in any practice time before the first game.

When the team hit the ice for their first match, the biggest change was on the blueline. Both starting defensemen had graduated so Culhane, who had previously played wing, was deployed alongside Mahoney, who had been a reserve player as a freshman. There was a bit of hand-wringing over the novice defense but the Boston Hockey Club showed that the bigger worry was on offense. The forwards were without star center Leo Hughes and found it difficult to score in the opening loss. The following week saw those trends continue as the forwards could still only record a single goal, however, the defense was better than advertised and provided the team a win with a 1–0 shutout of McGill. Just as the team was beginning to feel good about its chances, however, the hopes of a repeat championship were dashed by a pair of Canadian colleges after Christmas. The smaller BC team was pushed around by their northern opponents and could only manage 2 goals in 3 consecutive defeats.

Though the first part of the season would not normally have precluded Boston College from competing for a second championship, the Eagles were scheduled to play just three intercollegiate games all season. This happened in part because the team was unable to afford playing more than a few road games but also because the future Ivy League team would not play against BC. This left BC only able to judge itself against common opponents and many of the teams that they faced were superior in talent, training and experience. Even when they played local teams like the Boston Athletic Association, they were playing against semi-pros, many of whom were former college stars. BC did well to keep the score close in those games but they finished out the month of January with three further losses and sat with a terrible 1–7 record midway through their season. Hampering the efforts of the club was the lack of suitable reserve players that forced the starters to play most of if not all of the time. Several of their games were lost in the final minutes but that fact did little to improve their chances for a title.

After a match with the B.A.A. at Green Hill Park during the exam break, the team returned home with a renewed fight from the forwards. Groden opened the scoring against the Boston Hockey Club but it was Culhane who was the star. The junior winger netted two goals, including the overtime winner, to give BC its first win in almost two months. After a pair of close wins over amateur clubs, BC travelled to meet Army for their only intercollegiate match of the season. The Eagles fought bitterly with the Cadets for the win and the two sides needed overtime to settle the score. In the extra session, however, the game completely tilted in favor of Boston College and the Maroons scored three additional goals to take the match. During that stretch, Mahoney had been felled by an injury and was replaced on the blueline by Fitzgerald. Fitz' place in goal was aptly filled by Connell.

With their winning streak up to 4 games, BC headed home with a chance to finish the year above .500. The only problem was that in all 5 of their remaining games, the team would face amateur or semi-pro teams made up of more experience players. The Eagles didn't seem to mind when they dispatched Montreal Le National after a brilliant opening period. A further win brought the team's record back to even but that was as far as the Eagles could go. The offense sputtered in the final three games of the year, all losses, and even with the return of Mahoney, the defense wasn't able to withstand the attack from their opponents. To add insult to injury, in the final game of the year a fight broke out in the stands. One man was injured after being pushed down the stone stairs and the police were called in to break up the melee. While The section that contained the students from BC were not a part of the riot, the school was nonetheless censured for the disruption.

William Kelleher served as team manager.

== Roster ==
| No. | Nat. | Player | Class | Pos | Height | Weight | DoB | Hometown | Previous team |
|---|---|---|---|---|---|---|---|---|---|
| | | Connell | Junior | G |
| | (United States) | John F. Culhane | Junior | D | | | | Cambridge, Massachusetts |
| | (United States) | John R. Curry | Senior (RS) | F | | | | Cambridge, Massachusetts |
| | (United States) | John C. Fitzgerald (C) | Junior | G/D | | | | Cambridge, Massachusetts |
| | (United States) | James H. Foley | Junior | F | | | 1901-10-28 | Cambridge, Massachusetts |
| | (United States) | Henry E. Groden | Junior | F | | | | Cambridge, Massachusetts |
| | (United States) | Francis X. Mahoney | Sophomore | D | | | | Cambridge, Massachusetts |

== Standings ==
1923–24 Eastern Collegiate ice hockey standings
| | Intercollegiate | | | | | | | Overall | | | | | |
| | GP | W | L | T | Pct. | GF | GA | GP | W | L | T | GF | GA |
|---|---|---|---|---|---|---|---|---|---|---|---|---|---|
| Amherst | 11 | 5 | 5 | 1 | .500 | 16 | 17 | 11 | 5 | 5 | 1 | 16 | 17 |
| Army | 6 | 3 | 3 | 0 | .500 | 15 | 13 | 8 | 3 | 5 | 0 | 23 | 30 |
| Bates | 8 | 8 | 0 | 0 | 1.000 | 31 | 3 | 11 | 9 | 2 | 0 | 34 | 9 |
| Boston College | 1 | 1 | 0 | 0 | 1.000 | 6 | 3 | 18 | 7 | 10 | 1 | 32 | 45 |
| Boston University | 7 | 1 | 6 | 0 | .143 | 10 | 34 | 9 | 1 | 8 | 0 | 11 | 42 |
| Bowdoin | 5 | 1 | 2 | 2 | .400 | 10 | 17 | 6 | 1 | 3 | 2 | 10 | 24 |
| Clarkson | 4 | 1 | 3 | 0 | .250 | 6 | 12 | 7 | 3 | 4 | 0 | 11 | 19 |
| Colby | 7 | 1 | 4 | 2 | .286 | 9 | 18 | 8 | 1 | 5 | 2 | 11 | 21 |
| Cornell | 4 | 2 | 2 | 0 | .500 | 22 | 11 | 4 | 2 | 2 | 0 | 22 | 11 |
| Dartmouth | – | – | – | – | – | – | – | 17 | 10 | 5 | 2 | 81 | 32 |
| Hamilton | – | – | – | – | – | – | – | 12 | 7 | 3 | 2 | – | – |
| Harvard | 9 | 6 | 3 | 0 | .667 | 35 | 19 | 18 | 6 | 10 | 2 | – | – |
| Maine | 7 | 3 | 4 | 0 | .429 | 20 | 18 | 12 | 4 | 8 | 0 | 33 | 60 |
| Massachusetts Agricultural | 8 | 2 | 6 | 0 | .250 | 17 | 38 | 9 | 3 | 6 | 0 | 19 | 38 |
| Middlebury | 5 | 0 | 4 | 1 | .100 | 2 | 10 | 7 | 0 | 6 | 1 | 3 | 16 |
| MIT | 4 | 0 | 4 | 0 | .000 | 2 | 27 | 4 | 0 | 4 | 0 | 2 | 27 |
| Pennsylvania | 6 | 1 | 4 | 1 | .250 | 6 | 23 | 8 | 1 | 5 | 2 | 8 | 28 |
| Princeton | 13 | 8 | 5 | 0 | .615 | 35 | 20 | 18 | 12 | 6 | 0 | 63 | 28 |
| Rensselaer | 5 | 2 | 3 | 0 | .400 | 5 | 31 | 5 | 2 | 3 | 0 | 5 | 31 |
| Saint Michael's | – | – | – | – | – | – | – | – | – | – | – | – | – |
| Syracuse | 2 | 1 | 1 | 0 | .500 | 5 | 11 | 6 | 2 | 4 | 0 | 11 | 24 |
| Union | 4 | 2 | 2 | 0 | .500 | 13 | 10 | 5 | 3 | 2 | 0 | 18 | 12 |
| Williams | 11 | 2 | 7 | 2 | .273 | 11 | 22 | 13 | 4 | 7 | 2 | 18 | 24 |
| Yale | 15 | 14 | 1 | 0 | .933 | 60 | 12 | 23 | 18 | 4 | 1 | 80 | 33 |
| YMCA College | 6 | 1 | 5 | 0 | .167 | 6 | 39 | 7 | 2 | 5 | 0 | 11 | 39 |

== Schedule and results ==
| Date | Opponent | Site | Result | Record |
Regular Season
| December 13 | vs. Boston Hockey Club* | Boston Arena • Boston, Massachusetts | L 1–5 | 0–1–0 |
| December 20 | McGill* | Boston Arena • Boston, Massachusetts | W 1–0 | 1–1–0 |
| December 27 | New Brunswick* | Boston Arena • Boston, Massachusetts | L 1–3 | 1–2–0 |
| December 28 | Toronto* | Boston Arena • Boston, Massachusetts | L 1–3 | 1–3–0 |
| January 1 | Toronto* | Boston Arena • Boston, Massachusetts | L 0–3 | 1–4–0 |
| January 15 | vs. Boston Athletic Association* | Boston Arena • Boston, Massachusetts | L 1–3 | 1–5–0 |
| January 17 | Berlin Hockey Club* | Boston Arena • Boston, Massachusetts | L 1–3 | 1–6–0 |
| January 21 | Maple Athletic Association* | Boston Arena • Boston, Massachusetts | L 1–2 ^{OT} | 1–7–0 |
| February 2 | vs. Boston Athletic Association* | Green Hill Park • Worcester, Massachusetts | T 0–0 | 1–7–1 |
| February 7 | vs. Boston Hockey Club* | Boston Arena • Boston, Massachusetts | W 4–3 ^{2OT} | 2–7–1 |
| February 15 | Abegweits* | Boston Arena • Boston, Massachusetts | W 2–1 | 3–7–1 |
| February 20 | Maple Athletic Association* | Boston Arena • Boston, Massachusetts | W 1–0 | 4–7–1 |
| February 23 | at Army* | Stuart Rink • West Point, New York | W 6–3 ^{OT} | 5–7–1 |
| February 29 | Montreal Le National* | Boston Arena • Boston, Massachusetts | W 3–1 | 6–7–1 |
| March 5 | Nashua Nationals* | Boston Arena • Boston, Massachusetts | W 7–3 | 7–7–1 |
| March 7 | Ottawa Shamrocks* | Boston Arena • Boston, Massachusetts | L 0–3 | 7–8–1 |
| March 12 | vs. Boston Athletic Association* | Boston Arena • Boston, Massachusetts | L 1–3 | 7–8–1 |
| March 14 | Montreal Victorias* | Boston Arena • Boston, Massachusetts | L 1–6 | 7–10–1 |
*Non-conference game.
