= Francis Reynolds =

Francis Reynolds may refer to:

- Francis A. Reynolds (died 1970), American college athletics administrator
- Francis Reynolds-Moreton, 3rd Baron Ducie (1739–1808), British naval officer
- Francis Reynolds (priest) (died 1852), archdeacon of Bombay
- Francis Esmond Reynolds (1882–1967), British pathologist and medical author
- Francis Reynolds (legal scholar) (born 1932), professor of law at the University of Oxford
- Francis Reynolds (politician) (died 1773), British politician, member of parliament for Lancaster

== See also ==
- Frances Reynolds (disambiguation)
