= 1922–23 Boston College Eagles men's ice hockey season =

East Intercollegiate Champions
- Conference: Independent
- Home ice: Boston Arena

Record
- Overall: 12–1–1
- Home: 4–1–0
- Road: 4–0–0
- Neutral: 4–0–1

Coaches and captains
- Head coach: Fred Rocque
- Captain: Ed Garrity

The 1922–23 Boston College Eagles men's ice hockey season was the 6th season of play for the program. The Eagles were coached by Fred Rocque in his 3rd season.

== Season ==
Boston College entered its third season under Fred Rocque with a vastly expanded schedule. Team captain Ed Garrity wrote an op-ed in the student newspaper, presenting a case for great optimism for the program. One of the biggest reasons for his assertion was that all of the players who were on the previous year's (claimed but unrealized) championship team were back with the Eagles. Coach Rocque echoed his captain's sentiment and pushed the team heard through their training sessions in December. While a number of new freshmen were keen to join the team, the starting lineup was almost unchanged from a year ago. Once more, BC attempted to lure Harvard into an official game rather than the exhibition match that the Crimson had accented to a year before. As Harvard were the three-time defending champions, the Eagles saw this potential game as key to their claim for a championship. The Crimson, however, remained coy about the match and never agreed to term with BC.

On Christmas day, Boston College opened its season with a preliminary match against the Boston Hockey Club. The team they faced was composed of former college players and the Eagles did well to come out of the game with a tie. A bigger test came three days later when McGill arrived for their seemingly annual trip south. The Redmen had taken BC to task a year before but the Eagles were well prepared for the Canadian invaders. BC outplayed the men from Montreal and strangled the McGill offense with the outstanding play of Garrity and Leo Morrissey. Fitzgerald, too, was stout in goal and limited the reds to just a single goal. The BC offense was in full flight and ended the night with three goal to avenge their loss from '21.

The Eagles were feeling even better about their prospects after the auspicious start and seemed to take MIT a bit lightly a few weeks later. While BC was in control for the entire game, the Eagles didn't show the same fight they had in December. Fortunately, the defense was still on point and prevented any lapses by the forwards from triggering an upset. Bill Morrissey, Len's younger brother, played opposite to Garrity in Len absence and didn't look out of place on the blueline. The following night, the team faced Red Synnott's Victorias Hockey Club and the Eagles resumed their early-season form. Despite some doomsayers projecting a loss on the Eagles, BC got off to a quick start and Culhane had the Maroon and Gold on the scoresheet in under 2 minutes. Sonny Foley scored on a pass from Culhane in the second and was the darling of the crowd, skating in a flourish all night. Unfortunately, he took a hard tumble in the later portion of the match that cost him a tooth and forced him to miss the end of the game. Luckily, Boston College was ahead by then and the total team defense was effective in keeping the Victorias back. Culhane's second goal of the evening finished off the scoring and turned BC into the prohibitive favorites for the intercollegiate title.

Despite a two-week gap in their schedule, the Eagles were unable to add any games and had to contend themselves with practice sessions until the 26th when they met Boston University. Even with Culhane out of the lineup, the Eagles' attack was impressive. The BU goalie, however, put on a masterful performance and kept a sure goal out of the net time and again. The Eagles' defense, however, didn't seem to take the scarlet skaters seriously and took it easy in the first part of the match. BC received a shock at the start of the second when it suddenly found itself down by a goal. While the team shored up its defenses, there was no panic on the offensive side as the Eagles believed they could score at will against their Bostonian counterparts. However, Boston University pulled its forwards back afterwards and played a 5-man defense in the hopes of carrying their lead to the end. Nearly two periods passed before the Eagles could respond and it was former captain, Leo Hughes, who was the hero of the night by tying the match in the waning moments. Two 5-minute overtime sessions were agreed upon which was to be followed by a sudden death period if the score remained even. In the first mist of extra play, BU regained the lead and once more tried to hold off the Eagles. This time it was current captain Garrity who knotted the score with seconds to spare in the second overtime. By the time the third overtime began, both teams looked exhausted. The only sub that BC had used in the match was Groden, but BU wasn't in much better shape. After about 15 minutes of play from the tired men, Len Morrissey stole the puck, made a desperate rush towards the net and fired the puck into the goal for the winning score. A week later the teams met in a rematch with Culhane back on the ice. BU was unable to get a repeat performance from their goaltender and surrendered 7 goals to fully-powered eagles, extending BC's unbeaten streak to six.

With the Eagles as the front-runners for the title, they accepted a game with the Canadian collegiate champions, Queen's. Even if Boston College couldn't schedule a match with Harvard, they could at least get in a match with a squad that was no worse than the Crimson's equal. The anticipation for the game caused spectators to pack themselves into the Boston Arena and watch as the large Canadians took on the smaller, but faster, Eagle sextet. Foley and Culhane appeared to skate rings around the Gaels and distracted the Queen's defenders long enough for Hughes to pot two goals. Meanwhile, Len Morrissey, Garrity and Fitzgerald played one of the best defensive games ever seen from a college team and held the Gales to a single goal. The mildly stunning win gave Boston College a claim on an international college title so long as they could hold onto their domestic crown.

A little over a week later, BC headed out on its only road trip of the season. The team was set to play four games in four days starting with a match against Army. This was the final game in a long season for the Cadets, who had posted a respectable record. The West Pointers were no match for the Eagles, however, and BC hammered their opponents 9–1. The next day the team was set against Hamilton who were at the end of a rather down year. Boston College were again victors in a lopsided match. The games were so controlled by BC that Dan Murphy was inserted into the goal in both matches. Probably the biggest note of the weekend was the return of John Curry, who had missed most of the season due to injury. The Eagles ended their trip with a two-night stay in Buffalo against the Nichols Club. Similar to the Boston Hockey Club, Nichols was stocked with former college stars and would prove a much tougher challenge than the other two New York teams. Fitzgerald proved to be the deciding factor in both games, holding on to a narrow lead in the first that was provided by Leo Hughes, the BC netminder then shutout Nichols in the rematch to give the team a clean sweep of their road trip.

After returning home the team was able to get in some needed rest before a match against the Boston Athletic Association. Once more, the defense was impenetrable and Fitzgerald earned his third shutout of the year. Culhane was injured by a hard check in the middle of the game and Groden stepped in to take his place. By the third, however, Culhane was back on the ice and he teamed up with Foley to score the first goal of the game and break the deadlock. Len Morrissey added another to end the scoring and give the Eagles the unquestioned title of 'Eastern Intercollegiate Champions'.

The newly minted champions were not finished with their season, however, and played a match against a club team from Duluth. The Eagles were slow out of the gate and found themselves down by a goal just 30 seconds into the match. Culhane evened the score several minutes later but BC knew they had a fight on their hands. The Minnesotans were at least as fast as the Eagles and Boston College was not able to simply outskate their opponents as they had done all season. Just before the close of the first, two Duluth skaters broke through the BC defense and scored to regain the lead. The two team battled to get the next goal but neither netminder was accommodating. BC was constantly having to play a stout defense to hold off Duluth that, though it succeeded, curtailed their efforts to tie the game. In the end the team ran out of time and opportunity and were never able to overcome the second deficit.

Though no longer undefeated, the team still had one final game to play and met the New Haven Hockey Club for their season finale. Taking a page from Duluth, BC got off to a quick start and scored three goals in the first few minutes of the game. New Haven responded with a redoubled defensive effort and then cut into the lead but the Eagles' advantage was too much. BC ended the year with their twelfth win and set a program record that would stand for almost 20 years.

Tom Cannon served as team manager.

== Roster ==
No.	Nat.	Player	Class	Pos	Height	Weight	DoB	Hometown	Previous team
	(United States)	John F. Culhane	Sophomore	W				Cambridge, Massachusetts
	(United States)	John R. Curry	Senior	W				Cambridge, Massachusetts
	(United States)	Raymond Duffy	Junior					Brighton, Massachusetts
	(United States)	John C. Fitzgerald	Sophomore	G				Cambridge, Massachusetts
	(United States)	James H. Foley	Sophomore	W			1901-10-28	Cambridge, Massachusetts
	(United States)	T. Edmund Garrity (C)	Senior	D				Belmont, Massachusetts
	(United States)	Henry E. Groden	Freshman	W				Cambridge, Massachusetts
	(United States)	S. Leo Hughes	Senior (RS)	C				Newton, Massachusetts
	(United States)	Arthur R. Johnson	Freshman					Brookline, Massachusetts
	(United States)	Francis X. Mahoney	Freshman					Cambridge, Massachusetts
	(United States)	Leonard G. Morrissey	Senior	D				Medford, Massachusetts
	(United States)	William A. Morrissey	Sophomore	D				Medford, Massachusetts
	(United States)	Edward O. Mullowney	Freshman					Brookline, Massachusetts
	(United States)	Daniel J. Murphy	Junior	G				Arlington, Massachusetts

== Standings ==
1922–23 Eastern Collegiate ice hockey standings
	Intercollegiate							Overall					
	GP	W	L	T	Pct.	GF	GA	GP	W	L	T	GF	GA
Amherst	8	4	3	1	.563	15	24	8	4	3	1	15	24
Army	11	5	6	0	.455	26	35	14	7	7	0	36	39
Bates	9	6	3	0	.667	34	25	12	8	4	0	56	32
Boston College	5	5	0	0	1.000	30	6	14	12	1	1	53	18
Boston University	7	2	5	0	.286	21	22	8	2	6	0	22	26
Bowdoin	6	3	3	0	.500	18	28	9	5	4	0	37	33
Clarkson	3	1	1	1	.500	3	14	6	2	3	1	18	28
Colby	6	2	4	0	.333	15	21	6	2	4	0	15	21
Columbia	9	0	9	0	.000	14	35	9	0	9	0	14	35
Cornell	6	1	3	2	.333	6	16	6	1	3	2	6	16
Dartmouth	12	10	2	0	.833	49	20	15	13	2	0	67	26
Hamilton	7	2	5	0	.286	20	34	10	4	6	0	37	53
Harvard	10	7	3	0	.700	27	11	12	8	4	0	34	19
Maine	6	2	4	0	.333	16	23	6	2	4	0	16	23
Massachusetts Agricultural	9	3	4	2	.444	13	24	9	3	4	2	13	24
Middlebury	3	0	3	0	.000	1	6	3	0	3	0	1	6
MIT	8	3	5	0	.375	16	52	8	3	5	0	16	52
Pennsylvania	6	1	4	1	.250	8	36	7	2	4	1	11	38
Princeton	15	11	4	0	.733	84	21	18	12	5	1	93	30
Rensselaer	5	1	4	0	.200	6	23	5	1	4	0	6	23
Saint Michael's	3	1	2	0	.333	4	5	–	–	–	–	–	–
Union	0	0	0	0	–	0	0	3	2	1	0	–	–
Williams	9	5	3	1	.611	33	17	10	6	3	1	40	17
Yale	13	9	4	0	.692	70	16	15	9	6	0	75	26

== Schedule and results ==
Date	Opponent	Site	Result	Record
Regular Season
December 25	vs. Boston Hockey Club*	Boston Arena • Boston, Massachusetts	T 3–3	0–0–1
December 28	McGill*	Boston Arena • Boston, Massachusetts	W 3–1	1–0–1
January 11	vs. MIT*	Boston Arena • Boston, Massachusetts	W 4–0	2–0–1
January 12	Victorias Hockey Club*	Boston Arena • Boston, Massachusetts	W 3–1	3–0–1
January 26	vs. Boston University*	Boston Arena • Boston, Massachusetts	W 3–2 ^{3OT}	4–0–1
February 7	vs. Boston University*	Boston Arena • Boston, Massachusetts	W 7–2	5–0–1
February 12	Queen's*	Boston Arena • Boston, Massachusetts	W 2–1	6–0–1
February 21	at Army*	Stuart Rink • West Point, New York	W 9–1	7–0–1
February 22	at Hamilton*	Russell Sage Rink • Clinton, New York	W 7–1	8–0–1
February 23	at Nichols Hockey Club*	Broadway Auditorium • Buffalo, New York	W 3–2	9–0–1
February 24	at Nichols Hockey Club*	Broadway Auditorium • Buffalo, New York	W 3–0	10–0–1
March 1	vs. Boston Athletic Association*	Boston Arena • Boston, Massachusetts	W 2–0	11–0–1
March 6	Duluth Hockey Club*	Boston Arena • Boston, Massachusetts	L 1–2	11–1–1
March 9	New Haven Hockey Club*	Boston Arena • Boston, Massachusetts	W 3–2	12–1–1
*Non-conference game.
