= Richard A. O'Brien =

American Jesuit and university official

The Reverend Richard A. O'Brien SJ
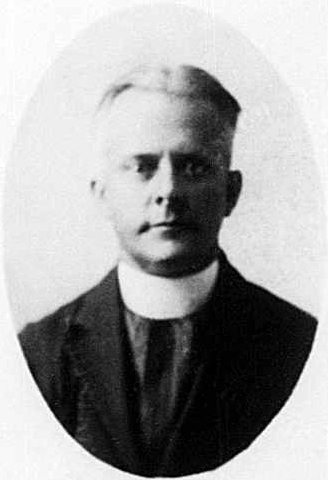

16th Rector of the Ateneo de Manila University
- In office 1927–1933
- Preceded by: Francis J. Carlin
- Succeeded by: Henry C. Avery

Boston College Athletic Director
- In office 1919–1924 Serving with Francis A. Reynolds
- President: William J. Devlin
- Preceded by: Rev. John P. Meagher
- Succeeded by: Francis A. Reynolds
- In office 1916–1918
- President: Charles W. Lyons
- Preceded by: Rev. William F. McFadden
- Succeeded by: Rev. John P. Meagher

Personal details
- Born: August 15, 1880 Baltimore, U.S.
- Died: December 5, 1933 (aged 53) Manila, Philippines
- Education: Woodstock College
- Profession: Professor; Athletic director Jesuit Priest

Richard Albert O'Brien (August 15, 1880 – December 5, 1933) was an American Jesuit official who served as rector of Ateneo de Manila University and athletic director of Boston College.

== Early life ==
O'Brien was born in Baltimore on August 15, 1880. His father, William J. O'Brien, was a member of the United States House of Representatives and a judge of the orphans' court of Baltimore. His brother was Frederick O'Brien, author of White Shadows in the South Seas. O'Brien entered the Jesuit order in 1901 and studied at Woodstock College. He was ordained in 1912 and completed his tertianship at St. Andrew-on-Hudson in Poughkeepsie, New York in 1915.

== Boston College ==
In 1915 O'Brien joined the Boston College faculty as a professor of Latin, Greek, English, and Evidence of Religion as well as faculty director of athletics. During his tenure as athletic director, the school's athletic teams quickly improved. In 1916, the football team defeated their rival Holy Cross for the first time since 1899. In 1918 O’Brien entered the United States Army as a chaplain. He returned to BC in 1919. That year, O'Brien and BC President William J. Devlin recruited Francis A. Reynolds to the position of graduate director of athletics. Reynolds was responsible for hiring football coach Frank Cavanaugh, hockey coaches Fred Rocque and Sonny Foley, baseball coaches Olaf Henriksen, Jack Slattery, and Hugh Duffy, and track coach Jack Ryder.

== Philippines ==
In 1924, O’Brien left Boston College for the Philippines. In 1927 he was appointed Rector of Ateneo de Manila University by Rev. James J. Carlin. In July 1932 he was made treasurer of the Jesuit order in the Philippines. In August 1932, Ateneo de Manila University was destroyed by fire and O'Brien took over the College of San Jose in Manila. He oversaw the construction of new buildings and the expansion of existing ones so that the work of Ateneo de Manila could continue. O’Brien died on December 5, 1933, in Manila of a heart attack. He was 53 years old.
