= Frances Reynolds =

Frances Reynolds may refer to:

- Frances Reynolds (artist), British artist
- Frances Reynolds (academic), British historian and Assyriologist
- Frances Reynolds (fencer), Welsh fencer
- Frances Reynolds Keyser, née Reynolds, American suffragist, clubwoman, and educator

== See also ==
- Francis Reynolds (disambiguation)
