= 1923–24 Princeton Tigers men's ice hockey season =

College ice hockey season

- Conference: 3rd THL
- Home ice: Hobey Baker Memorial Rink

Record
- Overall: 12–6–0
- Conference: 1–4–0
- Home: 9–2–0
- Road: 3–4–0

Coaches and captains
- Head coach: Chippy Gaw
- Captain: Albert Wall

The 1923–24 Princeton Tigers men's ice hockey season was the 24th season of play for the program. The Tigers represented Princeton University and were coached Chippy Gaw in his 2nd season.

== Season ==
=== Early triumphs ===
As Princeton was still getting used to operating their own rink the team had a slight delay in getting its first on-ice practice. Chippy Gaw was coach of the team once more and the team hoped to improve on a tremendous performance that came up just shy against their conference rivals. However, the bench boss was less than happy to see just 31 men dressed for the initial practice, which included just 5 returning lettermen. While most colleges would have been overjoyed to get such numbers, Princeton was supposed to be competing for an intercollegiate title with Dartmouth, Harvard and Yale and the Tigers would need every man at their disposal to have a fighting chance. For comparison, 30 freshmen attended the first practice for the yearling team. Despite the hand-wringing, the team began to round into shape by the middle of December and the Tigers were getting ready for their first match just before the Christmas break.

Princeton opened its season against the St. Nicholas Hockey Club with a resounding victory. The Tigers looked like a well-oiled machine in the match and demonstrated a high level of teamwork and defense that should serve them well as the season progressed. Despite Princeton grad Jewitt opening the scoring for the visitors, Princeton was able to finish the first period with a lead thanks to tallies from Van Gerbig and captain Wall. Constant pressure by the Tigers eventually broke through a masterful goaltending performance in the second for the team's third goal. Play opened up in the final period but Princeton's defenses refused to yield. Alex Sayles was the high-scorer in his first varsity game with 2 goals but the entire team was responsible for the win. The team then travelled north to take on Boston University. The one-sided match ended in favor of the Tigers and the team disbanded for their holiday break afterwards.

The players gathered together on the 27th to begin practicing for the game with the Boston Athletic Association. The club was the defending national amateur champions and would send five players to the upcoming Olympics. A hard-fought match ended with Princeton suffering its first loss of the year but it was hardly a black-mark for the program. A few days later, the team ended its road excursion with a visit to Dartmouth. The two teams were evenly-matched in talent, however, with Princeton able to train more often than the Greens, the Tigers were able to pull out a victory in the end. Unfortunately, late in the game Ed Stout was cut on the arm, severing a tendon. The team feared that he would be lost for the season if not longer.

=== Narrow losses ===
After their game with Maine was cancelled, the team met St. Nicholas for a rematch. This time the Tigers had to battle through a tremendous display of goaltending from the amateurs in the form of former Harvard standout, Jabish Holmes. The game was scoreless until the third period when Gleason surrendered the game's first marker. Princeton upped their attack and managed to get the tying goal four minutes later when Charles Davis converted on a Van Gerbig pass. In the back half of the period, Austin Davis scored the go-ahead goal but the team still had to resist a counterattack. After Van Gerbig was called for an infraction, the Tigers were forced to kill off a penalty in the final 2 minutes but Gleason managed to save the day hold of St. Nicks for the win.

The good start to the season set Princeton up for their opening Triangular Hockey League games. The first leg of both series were played in mid-January with a trip to Yale on the 12th. 3,500 were able to witness Van Gerbig have one of the best games by a Princeton player since before the war. However, his two goals were matched by the Bulldogs. The Tigers were able to go the entire game without taking a penalty but a weak defensive effort still allowed the Elis to break into the Princeton end. After 45 minutes, the score was tied 2–2 and overtime was needed. Yale began the first extra session by scoring what they hoped was the winning goal, however, Van Gerbig finished off his hat-trick before time had elapsed and forced a second overtime. Yale again took a lead but this time Princeton was unable to respond went home defeated. A week later the team welcomed Harvard to town but the defense was again a weak point for the Tigers. The Crimson played an outstanding game but were given few opportunities to score due to the Tigers once more not taking a single penalty in the game. Princeton, on the other hand, was now down two starting forwards as Sayles had received a cut to the head during warmups, though he was only expected to miss one game. After a scoreless first period, the game seemed to be setting up as a defensive battle. However, in the second period Harvard scored on a long shots from center ice. The play caught Gleason completely by surprise and he barely reacted to the puck as it sailed into the net. Nine minutes, later, the Crimson repeated the feat from even longer range and gave themselves a rather unearned 2-goal lead. Colebrook replaced Gleason in goal and the Tigers had to switch to a more offensive footing in the third, employing four forwards for the entire period. Unfortunately, all that served to do was open up their defenses to Harvard's attack. The two teams exchanged goals in the third but, with their offense crippled due to injury, the Tigers could not overcome the errors in the second.

=== Hot streak ===
After the disappointing losses, Princeton had to recollect itself for the third meeting with St. Nicholas. Keen to avenge the earlier losses, the Tigers treated the game as more of a practice session in preparation for Cornell later in the week. Gleason was back in as a starter, however, he was yanked immediately after surrendering the opening goal just 3 minutes into the game. Princeton kept the balance of play for most of the match, nearly doubling St. Nick's in shots on goal, but Holmes was a veritable wall in goal and would not allow the Tigers an inch. A Princeton goal at the end of the second was wave off because a forward pass had immediately preceded the shot. Undeterred, Van Gerbig finally got the Tigers on the board at the start of the third after a solo rush up the ice. Regulation ended with the score unchanged with both goaltenders being the starts of the match. Overtime was another matter entirely. Captain Wall broke the tie 29 seconds into the first extra session and was followed three minutes later by Van Gerbig. Howell completed his hat-trick with a minute left in the second overtime as Princeton was able to capitalize on exhausted amateurs who did not use any alternates in the game. A few days later the team hosted Cornell but the visitors were hampered by a severe lack of practice. The match was hardly in doubt with the carnelian club reduced to playing as individuals in their first game of the year while the Tigers were in mid-season form. Coach Gaw was able to use virtually every player available in the game at multiple positions. Gleason and Colebrook shared the shutout while Charles David and Van Gerbig finished with 3 and 2 goals respectively.

The following week, Princeton travelled to face Army but the match was ruined by poor ice conditions. The rink's surface was so soft that the players could hardly skate and the game was shortened to one 15-minute period. Largely having to walk from one side to the other, Sayles scored the only goal in the rather comical contest. Getting back to playing hockey, the Tigers manhandled the Quaker Athletic Club 13–1 with the puck leaving the opponent's zone for only brief moments. Van Gerbig, Sayles and Scull each recorded hat-tricks in the game while Hallock, Stevens, Wall and Wilkinson rounded out the scoring.

=== Rematches ===
The team spent most of the next week taking their exams and entered the rematch with BU a bit rusty. However, the game was a mismatch and the Terriers were at the mercy of the Tigers all evening. Scull and Sayles each scored twice while Gleason and Colebrook continued to share the goal. The team then disbanded for a week to get some rest before heading into their showdown with Harvard. The Crimson had played just two games since defeated the Tigers a month earlier but they were buoyed in the game by a raucous home crowd. Charles Davis gave Harvard a taste of its own medicine by scoring the opening goal from center ice. Unfortunately, the Crimson defense remained one of the best units in all of college hockey and refused to allow a second goal to the invaders. Harvard tied the game at the start of the second and the two teams battled to great fanfare but little effect for the rest of regulation. The winning goal was scored by Harvard in the middle of the second overtime and ended any real chance the Tigers had at an intercollegiate title. Despite the fallout from the loss, Princeton was greeted by a capacity crowd for their next home game against Yale. Defense was again the story of the game with both teams proving resilient in the face of a desperate attack all night. While the puck entered the cages, no goals were scored in regulation or the first overtime due several that were disallowed for offsides. However, 45 seconds into the fifth period, Van Gerbig netted the only tally that was allowed to lead the Tigers to victory. Colebrook was called upon more than once to save the day and make a spectacular saves, playing the entire game in goal.

As Princeton already had three games scheduled for the following week, the rubber match with Yale was put off until the second week of March. In the meantime, the Tigers had to face Hamilton without the services of Van Gerbig or Austin Davis. While the star center was only temporarily unavailable, Davis had not done well in his exams and was ruled ineligible to play for the remainder of the year. Missing two of its top players, the team's offense looked sluggish in the first two periods with only a single goal Sayles to their credit. Fortunately, the defense appeared no worse for wear and the Continentals failed to score once. The third period saw a drastic uptick in scoring with the home team doubling up the visitors 4–2 to take the game. Sayles ended up with a hat-trick for his efforts. The next game brought Dartmouth to town looking for revenge. The Indians played the entire match using three defensemen and two forwards but it was an explosion on offense that typified the match. After Princeton entered the second with a 2–1 lead on goals from Sayles and Van Gerbig, the Greens dumped an avalanche of goals into the cage, led by a pair from Bob Hall. Finding themselves down by 3 goals entering the third, the Tigers tried to claw their way back into the game. While they were whistled for a few uncharacteristic penalties, the team was severely impacted when Sayles and Davis ran into one another at high speed. Sayles was able to finish the game and though Davis attempted to continue even managing to score a few minutes later, he eventually had to retire prematurely. Van Gerbig cut the deficit to 1 with about three and a half minutes to play but the Dartmouth defense closed ranks in final moments and didn't surrender any further opportunities.

=== Disappointing finish ===
In their penultimate game, the team played before a mostly empty arena against an amateur team with little history of playing hockey. The game was mostly a goaltending battle with Princeton able to score twice in the first two periods despite juggling their lines. The visitors were able to tie the score late in the third but it took the Tigers just 40 seconds to regain the lead and end with a win. Around that time, the administration decided that they needed to take steps in order to prevent head injuries. The school ordered that for any practices or games, the players would need to wear some kind of leather helmet or headgear, similar to that worn by the football team. Entering the final game, a win by the Tigers would result in a three-way tie foe the THL standings, since the Elis had already defeated Harvard, and likely result in no team being able to claim the east intercollegiate championship. The game started with Yale crashing down on the Princeton cage but Wall and the defense were able to turn the Elis back. In the back half of the period the Bulldogs were finally able to break through and carry their lead into the second. Just 55 seconds after the middle frame started, Wilkinson tied the match and began a long stretch of brilliant hockey. Austin Davis, who had been able to resolve his academic issues, was back in the lineup and nearly gave the Tigers the lead after a long rush up the ice by Wall. A few minutes later, a Yale player got on a breakaway and beat Colebrook but the goal was denied for offsides. After a second Yale goal was disallowed, both teams had to settle for a tie entering the third. The final period was muted at the start and didn't see much action until the second half. Suddenly, Yale raced up the ice and fired a shot past a startled Colebrook for their second goal of the game. The Elis then collapsed down to protect their cage for the final five minutes and were able to come away with both a win and intercollegiate championship.

Frederick B. Manchee served as team manager.

== Roster ==
No.	Nat.	Player	Class	Pos	Height	Weight	DoB	Hometown	Previous team
	(United States)	Mulfred A. Colebrook	Sophomore	G				Rochester, New York
	(United States)	Austin D. S. Davis	Sophomore	RW			1903-08-28	Albany, New York
	(United States)	Charles E. Davis Jr.	Junior	C/LW				Albany, New York
	(United States)	John A. Gleason	Junior	G				New York, New York
	(United States)	Gerard Hallock III	Sophomore	D/LW			1905-06-14	Pottstown, Pennsylvania
	(United States)	Alden Holm-Smith	Junior	D/LW				Boston, Massachusetts
	(United States)	E. Ralph Martin	Sophomore	D/F			1904-05-12	Brooklyn, New York
	(United States)	Karl H. Michelet	Sophomore	D/F			1904-04-03	Washington, D.C.
	(United States)	Frederic B. Möhle	Senior	D/LW			1901-02-23	New York, New York
	(United States)	Alexander Sayles	Sophomore	D/F			1903-04-08	New York, New York
	(United States)	William S. Scull II	Junior	D/W				Bryn Mawr, Pennsylvania
	(United States)	Robert M. Snyder	Junior	D/F				Summit, New Jersey
		Stevens		D/LW
	(United States)	Edmund C. Stout Jr.	Junior	LW/RW			1902-11-04	South Orange, New Jersey
	(United States)	George T. Trenholm	Sophomore	D/F			1902-11-11	Saint Paul, Minnesota
	(United States)	Howell Van Gerbig	Senior	D/F			1902-06-19	New York, New York
	(United States)	Albert C. Wall (C)	Senior	D/C			1902-02-12	South Orange, New Jersey
	(United States)	Burton F. Wilkinson	Sophomore	D/W			1905-05-11	Buffalo, New York

== Standings ==
1923–24 Eastern Collegiate ice hockey standings
	Intercollegiate							Overall					
	GP	W	L	T	Pct.	GF	GA	GP	W	L	T	GF	GA
Amherst	11	5	5	1	.500	16	17	11	5	5	1	16	17
Army	6	3	3	0	.500	15	13	8	3	5	0	23	30
Bates	8	8	0	0	1.000	31	3	11	9	2	0	34	9
Boston College	1	1	0	0	1.000	6	3	18	7	10	1	32	45
Boston University	7	1	6	0	.143	10	34	9	1	8	0	11	42
Bowdoin	5	1	2	2	.400	10	17	6	1	3	2	10	24
Clarkson	4	1	3	0	.250	6	12	7	3	4	0	11	19
Colby	7	1	4	2	.286	9	18	8	1	5	2	11	21
Cornell	4	2	2	0	.500	22	11	4	2	2	0	22	11
Dartmouth	–	–	–	–	–	–	–	17	10	5	2	81	32
Hamilton	–	–	–	–	–	–	–	12	7	3	2	–	–
Harvard	9	6	3	0	.667	35	19	18	6	10	2	–	–
Maine	7	3	4	0	.429	20	18	12	4	8	0	33	60
Massachusetts Agricultural	8	2	6	0	.250	17	38	9	3	6	0	19	38
Middlebury	5	0	4	1	.100	2	10	7	0	6	1	3	16
MIT	4	0	4	0	.000	2	27	4	0	4	0	2	27
Pennsylvania	6	1	4	1	.250	6	23	8	1	5	2	8	28
Princeton	13	8	5	0	.615	35	20	18	12	6	0	63	28
Rensselaer	5	2	3	0	.400	5	31	5	2	3	0	5	31
Saint Michael's	–	–	–	–	–	–	–	–	–	–	–	–	–
Syracuse	2	1	1	0	.500	5	11	6	2	4	0	11	24
Union	4	2	2	0	.500	13	10	5	3	2	0	18	12
Williams	11	2	7	2	.273	11	22	13	4	7	2	18	24
Yale	15	14	1	0	.933	60	12	23	18	4	1	80	33
YMCA College	6	1	5	0	.167	6	39	7	2	5	0	11	39

1923–24 Triangular Hockey League standings
	Conference								Overall					
	GP	W	L	T	PTS	SW	GF	GA	GP	W	L	T	GF	GA
Yale *	5	4	1	0	.800	2	15	6	23	18	4	1	80	33
Harvard	4	2	2	0	.500	1	7	12	18	6	10	2	–	–
Princeton	5	1	4	0	.200	0	8	12	18	12	6	0	63	28
* indicates conference champion

== Schedule and results ==
Date	Opponent	Site	Result	Record
Regular Season
December 17	St. Nicholas Hockey Club*	Hobey Baker Memorial Rink • Princeton, New Jersey	W 5–1	1–0–0
December 21	at Boston University*	Boston Arena • Boston, Massachusetts	W 4–0	2–0–0
December 31	at Boston Athletic Association*	Boston Arena • Boston, Massachusetts	L 1–2	2–1–0
January 4	at Dartmouth*	Occom Pond • Hanover, New Hampshire	W 2–1	3–1–0
January 8	St. Nicholas Hockey Club*	Hobey Baker Memorial Rink • Princeton, New Jersey	W 2–1	4–1–0
January 12	at Yale	New Haven Arena • New Haven, Connecticut	L 3–4 ^{2OT}	4–2–0 (0–1–0)
January 19	Harvard	Hobey Baker Memorial Rink • Princeton, New Jersey	L 2–4	4–3–0 (0–2–0)
January 24	St. Nicholas Hockey Club*	Hobey Baker Memorial Rink • Princeton, New Jersey	W 4–1 ^{2OT}	5–3–0
January 26	Cornell*	Hobey Baker Memorial Rink • Princeton, New Jersey	W 5–0	6–3–0
January 30	at Army*	Stuart Rink • West Point, New York	W 1–0	7–3–0
February 2	Quaker Athletic Club*	Hobey Baker Memorial Rink • Princeton, New Jersey	W 13–1	8–3–0
February 9	Boston University*	Hobey Baker Memorial Rink • Princeton, New Jersey	W 6–0	9–3–0
February 18	at Harvard	Boston Arena • Boston, Massachusetts	L 1–2 ^{2OT}	9–4–0 (0–3–0)
February 22	Yale	Hobey Baker Memorial Rink • Princeton, New Jersey	W 1–0 ^{2OT}	10–4–0 (1–3–0)
February 27	Hamilton*	Hobey Baker Memorial Rink • Princeton, New Jersey	W 5–2	11–4–0
March 1	Dartmouth*	Hobey Baker Memorial Rink • Princeton, New Jersey	L 4–5	11–5–0
March 5	at Briarcliff Lodge*	Hobey Baker Memorial Rink • Princeton, New Jersey	W 3–2	12–5–0
March 8	at Yale	New Haven Arena • New Haven, Connecticut	L 1–2	12–6–0 (1–4–0)
*Non-conference game.

Note: contemporary accounts have the game with Briarcliff Lodge on the March 5.
