= 1923–24 Yale Bulldogs men's ice hockey season =

College ice hockey season

Eastern Collegiate, Champion Triangular League, Champion
- Conference: 1st THL
- Home ice: New Haven Arena

Record
- Overall: 18–4–1
- Conference: 4–1–0
- Home: 12–0–1
- Road: 2–2–0
- Neutral: 4–2–0

Coaches and captains
- Head coach: Clarence Wanamaker
- Assistant coaches: Holcomb York
- Captain: Charles O'Hearn

The 1923–24 Yale Bulldogs men's ice hockey season was the 29th season of play for the program.

== Season ==
Yale's season began much like any other, with the exception of their captain sidelined due to an injured ankle. Even with their best defender missing, the team was able to score enough to outlast the St. Nicholas Hockey Club and open with a win. After a mid-week loss to the New Haven Bears, who had swiftly become one of the top amateur clubs in the country, Yale played host to McGill and the backup netminder Ives earned a hard-fought shutout due to Jenkin's illness.

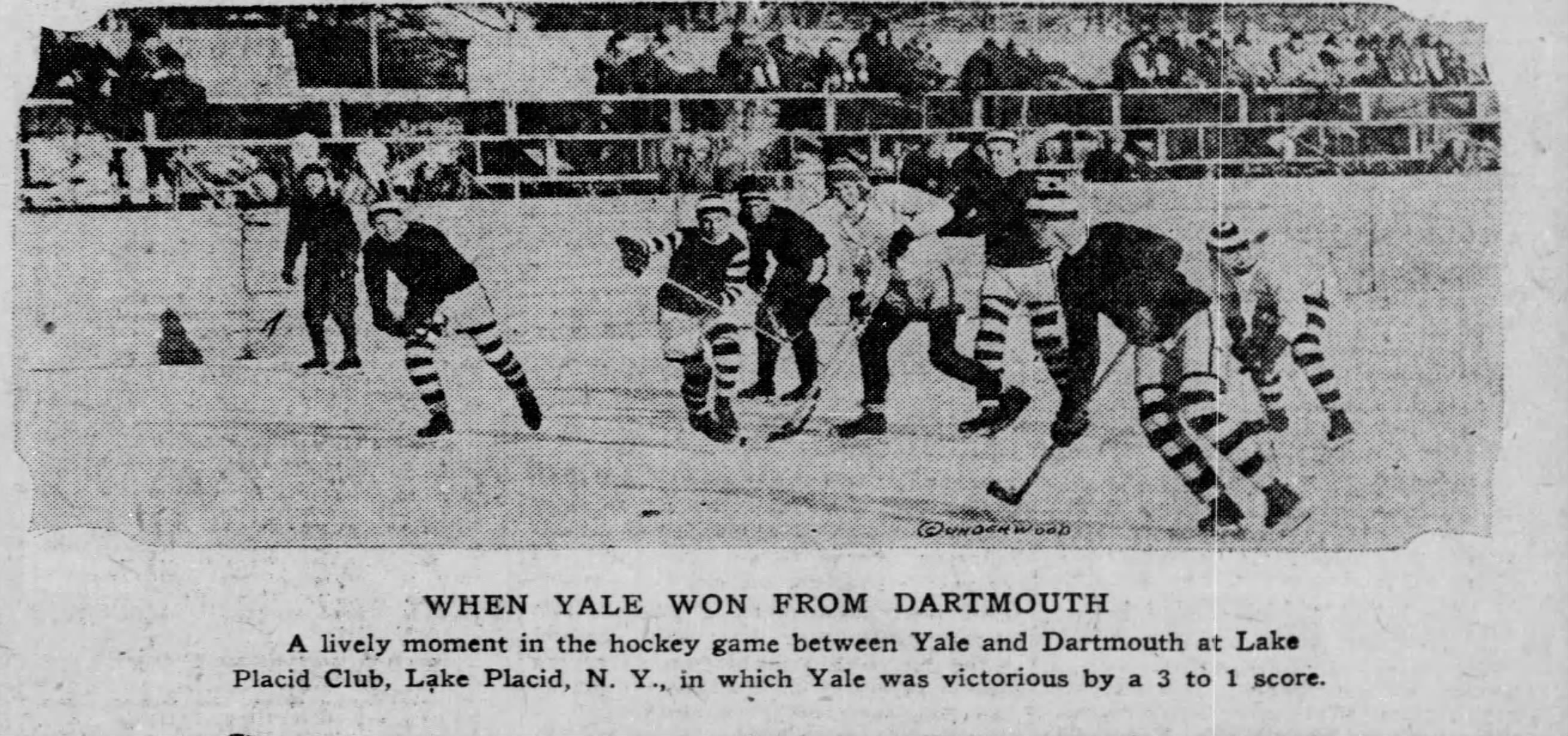
A photograph from the January 1, 1924 game against Dartmouth at Lake Placid

The victory over the Canadian team propelled Yale into their winter break and the team headed first to Cleveland. They played fairly even hockey with the local All-Stars and Athletic Club but the team began to hit its stride when it went to Lake Placid. Over a four-day span Yale played four other college teams and won every match. The team didn't score many goals, but the defense and goaltending was superb, limiting their opponents to 2 goals in the 4 games. Yale kept rolling when they returned home, defeating and then tying two more Canadian colleges to run their record to an impressive 8–2–1 as they entered their conference schedule.

They met Princeton on 12 January and the two teams looked to be the match of each other. Yale would go ahead twice, only for the Tigers to even the score both times and end regulation tied 2–2. The teams agreed to play two 5-minute overtime sessions and just 23 seconds into the first one Thomas Sargent scored to give Yale its third lead of the game. Princeton again tied the score before the frame had ended and after a mad dash for the net, Sargent scored his second overtime goal of the game. Yale held the Tigers back for the final three minutes and the team earned an impressive victory.

After losing to the New Haven Bears yet again, the Elis ran roughshod over their opponents for several weeks. Yale dominated both Pennsylvania and Massachusetts Agricultural College, outscoring the two 18–1. The only goal scored resulted from a bad bounce off of Farnsworth's skate and, in response, Jenkins refused to allow another for four games. The streak included wins over both Dartmouth and Harvard and gave Yale an inside track for the Eastern Collegiate Championship. With everything going their way, Yale was nearly toppled by Cornell. The Bulldogs scored twice in the first and appeared to relax, not taking their opponents seriously, which almost cost them the game. The Reds scored twice in the second but were still behind due to a third score from the Elis. The undermanned Cornell squad didn't use a single substitution in the game but they still skated rings around the Bulldogs. Yale's fourth goal proved too much for Cornell to overcome and the Elis escaped with a win.

In their next game Yale had apparently not learned its lesson and the team failed to score a single goal, losing 0–1 to Princeton after the Tigers scored with just 45 seconds remaining in the second extra session. Yale would have a third game with Princeton to decide the season series, but first they had to face Harvard. The Crimson may have been eager to repay Yale for the 3–0 loss earlier in the season but the Bulldogs were the stronger squad and send Harvard packing after a 6–1 victory. The win caped the first series win over their arch rivals in seven years and made this season the first since 1908 that Yale had not been defeated by Harvard (excluding the war year when Harvard did not field a team).

In their final game of the season, Yale could capture both the league championship and the Eastern Collegiate title with a win and they played hard defensive match against Princeton. Yale took a lead after one period but the Tigers tied the game less than a minute into the middle frame. With both goaltenders playing tremendously, it looked like the contest may be another overtime classic, however, a hard shot from O'Hearn with just over five minutes remaining put Yale ahead and the team formed a defensive shell around their net, preventing the Tigers from tying the score and Yale earned their first Championship in over fifteen years.

== Roster ==
No.	Nat.	Player	Class	Pos	Height	Weight	DoB	Hometown	Previous team
	(United States)	Clifford V. Brokaw Jr.	Junior	G			1902-01-11	Manhattan, New York
		William Chisholm	Senior	C
		Horace W. Cole	Sophomore	D
		Edmund P. Cottle	Sophomore	LW
		Benjamin C. Cutler	Sophomore	C
	(United States)	Vincent Farnsworth Jr.	Senior	LW			1901-04-11	Revere, Massachusetts
		Stephen G. Farrington	Junior	RW
		Samuel Ferguson Jr.	Sophomore	C
		Kenneth W. Ives	Sophomore	G
		G. Alston Jenkins	Junior	G
	(United States)	Alfred D. Lindley	Junior	D			1904-01-20	Paxton, Nebraska
	(United States)	Charles M. O'Hearn (C)	Senior	D				Brookline, Massachusetts
		Frederick A. Potts II	Sophomore	D
		Thomas D. Sargent	Junior	D			1901-12-30
	(United States)	Henry C. Scott	Junior	LW/RW				New York, New York
		A. Varick Stout	Sophomore	RW
		Harrison F. Turnbull	Junior	LW/RW

== Standings ==
1923–24 Eastern Collegiate ice hockey standings
	Intercollegiate							Overall					
	GP	W	L	T	Pct.	GF	GA	GP	W	L	T	GF	GA
Amherst	11	5	5	1	.500	16	17	11	5	5	1	16	17
Army	6	3	3	0	.500	15	13	8	3	5	0	23	30
Bates	8	8	0	0	1.000	31	3	11	9	2	0	34	9
Boston College	1	1	0	0	1.000	6	3	18	7	10	1	32	45
Boston University	7	1	6	0	.143	10	34	9	1	8	0	11	42
Bowdoin	5	1	2	2	.400	10	17	6	1	3	2	10	24
Clarkson	4	1	3	0	.250	6	12	7	3	4	0	11	19
Colby	7	1	4	2	.286	9	18	8	1	5	2	11	21
Cornell	4	2	2	0	.500	22	11	4	2	2	0	22	11
Dartmouth	–	–	–	–	–	–	–	17	10	5	2	81	32
Hamilton	–	–	–	–	–	–	–	12	7	3	2	–	–
Harvard	9	6	3	0	.667	35	19	18	6	10	2	–	–
Maine	7	3	4	0	.429	20	18	12	4	8	0	33	60
Massachusetts Agricultural	8	2	6	0	.250	17	38	9	3	6	0	19	38
Middlebury	5	0	4	1	.100	2	10	7	0	6	1	3	16
MIT	4	0	4	0	.000	2	27	4	0	4	0	2	27
Pennsylvania	6	1	4	1	.250	6	23	8	1	5	2	8	28
Princeton	13	8	5	0	.615	35	20	18	12	6	0	63	28
Rensselaer	5	2	3	0	.400	5	31	5	2	3	0	5	31
Saint Michael's	–	–	–	–	–	–	–	–	–	–	–	–	–
Syracuse	2	1	1	0	.500	5	11	6	2	4	0	11	24
Union	4	2	2	0	.500	13	10	5	3	2	0	18	12
Williams	11	2	7	2	.273	11	22	13	4	7	2	18	24
Yale	15	14	1	0	.933	60	12	23	18	4	1	80	33
YMCA College	6	1	5	0	.167	6	39	7	2	5	0	11	39

1923–24 Triangular Hockey League standings
	Conference								Overall					
	GP	W	L	T	PTS	SW	GF	GA	GP	W	L	T	GF	GA
Yale *	5	4	1	0	.800	2	15	6	23	18	4	1	80	33
Harvard	4	2	2	0	.500	1	7	12	18	6	10	2	–	–
Princeton	5	1	4	0	.200	0	8	12	18	12	6	0	63	28
* indicates conference champion

== Schedule and results ==
Date	Opponent	Site	Result	Record
Regular season
December 12	St. Nicholas Hockey Club*	New Haven Arena • New Haven, Connecticut	W 6–5	1–0–0
December 15	vs. New Haven Bears*	New Haven Arena • New Haven, Connecticut	L 1–4	1–1–0
December 19	McGill*	New Haven Arena • New Haven, Connecticut	W 1–0	2–1–0
December 21	at Cleveland All-Stars*	Elysium Arena • Cleveland, Ohio	W 3–2	3–1–0
December 22	at Cleveland Athletic Club*	Elysium Arena • Cleveland, Ohio	L 2–3	3–2–0
December 29	vs. Dartmouth*	Lake Placid Rink • Lake Placid, New York	W 2–1	4–2–0
December 30	vs. Williams*	Lake Placid Rink • Lake Placid, New York	W 1–0	5–2–0
December 30	vs. Amherst*	Lake Placid Rink • Lake Placid, New York	W 4–0	6–2–0
January 1	vs. Dartmouth*	Lake Placid Rink • Lake Placid, New York	W 3–1	7–2–0
January 3	Montreal*	New Haven Arena • New Haven, Connecticut	W 5–1	8–2–0
January 5	Queen's*	New Haven Arena • New Haven, Connecticut	T 2–2 ^{2OT}	8–2–1
January 12	Princeton	New Haven Arena • New Haven, Connecticut	W 4–3 ^{2OT}	9–2–1 (1–0–0)
January 18	vs. New Haven Bears*	New Haven Arena • New Haven, Connecticut	L 0–4	9–3–1
January 23	Pennsylvania*	New Haven Arena • New Haven, Connecticut	W 8–0	10–3–1
February 2	Massachusetts Agricultural*	New Haven Arena • New Haven, Connecticut	W 10–1	11–3–1
February 4	Dartmouth*	New Haven Arena • New Haven, Connecticut	W 2–0	12–3–1
February 9	at Harvard	Boston Arena • Boston, Massachusetts (Rivalry)	W 3–0	13–3–1 (2–0–0)
February 13	Boston University*	New Haven Arena • New Haven, Connecticut	W 6–0	14–3–1
February 16	Williams*	New Haven Arena • New Haven, Connecticut	W 5–0	15–3–1
February 19	Cornell*	New Haven Arena • New Haven, Connecticut	W 4–3	16–3–1
February 22	at Princeton	Hobey Baker Memorial Rink • Princeton, New Jersey	L 0–1	16–4–1 (2–1–0)
March 1	Harvard	New Haven Arena • New Haven, Connecticut (Rivalry)	W 6–1	17–4–1 (3–1–0)
March 8	Princeton	New Haven Arena • New Haven, Connecticut	W 2–1	18–4–1 (4–1–0)
*Non-conference game.

Note: Yale played twice on December 30, facing Williams during the day and Amherst in the evening.
