= Francis A. Reynolds =

American athletics administrator

Francis A. Reynolds was an American college athletics administrator who served as graduate manager of athletics at Boston College from 1919 to 1929.

== Early life ==
A graduate of Boston College High School, Reynolds attended Boston College, where he was the first baseman on the baseball team in 1913 and 1914. He was the assistant manager of the football team in 1914 and team manager in 1915. He graduated in 1916. During World War I, Reynolds was a lieutenant in the United States Army Air Service and served an aviation instructor at the Army Balloon School at Fort Omaha. In 1922 he married Lucy E. McCarthy of Roxbury. The ceremony was performed by Boston College president William J. Devlin.

== Athletic director ==
In 1919, Boston College President William J. Devlin and faculty director of athletics Richard A. O'Brien recruited Reynolds to the position of graduate director of athletics. The school's athletic reputation grew under Reynolds and his coaches, which included football coaches Frank Cavanaugh and Joe McKenney, track coach Jack Ryder, baseball coaches Olaf Henriksen, Jack Slattery, and Hugh Duffy, and hockey coaches Fred Rocque and Sonny Foley. Boston College's football teams, led by Luke Urban, Tony Comerford, Warren McGuirk, Al Weston, and Jack Heaphy, went undefeated 1920 and 1928.

In 1920, officials from Boston College and Johnny Evers reached a verbal agreement for Evers to become the school's head baseball coach. however, Evers instead accepted a last minute offer to join the New York Giants as a coach. Reynolds was instead able to sign Tommy McCarthy to a three-year contract, although he left after a year to join the Brooklyn Dodgers coaching staff.

After Harvard University removed Boston College from their 1920 football schedule, Reynolds canceled Boston College's scheduled baseball and hockey games against Harvard. BC and Harvard would not play each other in any sport again until 1943, when Harvard chose to play an informal schedule against local colleges and military teams due to World War II.

In November 1929, Reynolds left Boston College to enter the business world.

== Later life ==
In 1931 Reynolds opened a travel agency on Beacon Street in Boston. By 1967 he was living at the Brockton VA Medical Center in Brockton, Massachusetts. He died on November 21, 1970, after a long illness.
