= 1923–24 Harvard Crimson men's ice hockey season =

College ice hockey season

- Conference: 2nd Triangular League
- Home ice: Boston Arena

Record
- Overall: 6–7–1
- Conference: 2–2–0
- Home: 2–6–1
- Road: 1–1–0
- Neutral: 3–0–0

Coaches and captains
- Head coach: Alfred Winsor
- Captain: William Crosby

The 1923–24 Harvard Crimson men's ice hockey season was the 26th season of play for the program.

== Season ==
Though he is credited with coaching the 1923–24 team, William Henry Claflin Jr. left Harvard after 1923 and was replaced by his predecessor for one season. Alfred Winsor faced a tough task in trying to implement his defensive structure with college hockey now playing a 6-on-6 format rather than the 7-on-7 that saw him win seven Intercollegiate Championships. After early season success, the team faced a tough challenge from visiting Canadian colleges and lost all three matches, though the defense did perform well. After winning their next three intercollegiate games Harvard had hopes of winning another championship, but their campaign took a hit when they were stymied by Yale in early February.

Harvard still had a chance for the championship if they could win the season series against the Elis, but they would have to get by three other clubs before the rematch. After winning the season series over Princeton, Harvard had to face down Dartmouth and lost to the Indians for the second year in a row. No longer in the running for the Intercollegiate Championship, Harvard could still manage a league title if they could defeat Yale but the Elis had other ideas and downed the Crimson 6–1.

== Roster ==
| No. | Nat. | Player | Class | Pos | Height | Weight | DoB | Hometown | Previous team |
|---|---|---|---|---|---|---|---|---|---|
| | | William M. Austin | Junior | LW |
| | | Edward M. Beals Jr. | Junior | RW |
| | | Edward H. Bradford | Sophomore | G |
| | | George W. Burgess | Junior | C/LW/RW |
| | | Philip W. Chase | Junior | C/D |
| | (United States) | William E. Crosby Jr. (C) | Senior | D | | | | West Newton, Massachusetts |
| | (United States) | Thayer Cummings | Sophomore | G | | | | New York, New York |
| | (United States) | Harrison Gardner | Senior | C | | | | Boston, Massachusetts |
| | (England) | Sidney C. Graves | Senior | D | | | 1901-07-21 |
| | | John W. Hammond | Junior | D | 5' 11" (1.8 m) | 174 lb (79 kg) |
| | | Charles L. Harding Jr. | Sophomore | C/LW |
| | (United States) | Francis S. Hill | Senior | LW/RW | | | 1900-12-14 | Boston, Massachusetts |
| | (United States) | Clark Hodder | Junior | C/RW | | | 1903-11-09 | Newton, Massachusetts |
| | | Nathaniel S. Howe | Sophomore | LW/RW/D |
| | | Everett W. Martin | Sophomore | D |
| | | John L. Newell | Sophomore | G |
| | | Charles L. Pierson | Junior | RW |
| | | Laurence O. Pratt | Sophomore | D | | | 1904-05-07 |
| | (United States) | George G. Walker | Senior | LW | | | 1900-12-14 | Richmond, New York | St. Paul's School |

== Standings ==
1923–24 Eastern Collegiate ice hockey standings
| | Intercollegiate | | | | | | | Overall | | | | | |
| | GP | W | L | T | Pct. | GF | GA | GP | W | L | T | GF | GA |
|---|---|---|---|---|---|---|---|---|---|---|---|---|---|
| Amherst | 11 | 5 | 5 | 1 | .500 | 16 | 17 | 11 | 5 | 5 | 1 | 16 | 17 |
| Army | 6 | 3 | 3 | 0 | .500 | 15 | 13 | 8 | 3 | 5 | 0 | 23 | 30 |
| Bates | 8 | 8 | 0 | 0 | 1.000 | 31 | 3 | 11 | 9 | 2 | 0 | 34 | 9 |
| Boston College | 1 | 1 | 0 | 0 | 1.000 | 6 | 3 | 18 | 7 | 10 | 1 | 32 | 45 |
| Boston University | 7 | 1 | 6 | 0 | .143 | 10 | 34 | 9 | 1 | 8 | 0 | 11 | 42 |
| Bowdoin | 5 | 1 | 2 | 2 | .400 | 10 | 17 | 6 | 1 | 3 | 2 | 10 | 24 |
| Clarkson | 4 | 1 | 3 | 0 | .250 | 6 | 12 | 7 | 3 | 4 | 0 | 11 | 19 |
| Colby | 7 | 1 | 4 | 2 | .286 | 9 | 18 | 8 | 1 | 5 | 2 | 11 | 21 |
| Cornell | 4 | 2 | 2 | 0 | .500 | 22 | 11 | 4 | 2 | 2 | 0 | 22 | 11 |
| Dartmouth | – | – | – | – | – | – | – | 17 | 10 | 5 | 2 | 81 | 32 |
| Hamilton | – | – | – | – | – | – | – | 12 | 7 | 3 | 2 | – | – |
| Harvard | 9 | 6 | 3 | 0 | .667 | 35 | 19 | 18 | 6 | 10 | 2 | – | – |
| Maine | 7 | 3 | 4 | 0 | .429 | 20 | 18 | 12 | 4 | 8 | 0 | 33 | 60 |
| Massachusetts Agricultural | 8 | 2 | 6 | 0 | .250 | 17 | 38 | 9 | 3 | 6 | 0 | 19 | 38 |
| Middlebury | 5 | 0 | 4 | 1 | .100 | 2 | 10 | 7 | 0 | 6 | 1 | 3 | 16 |
| MIT | 4 | 0 | 4 | 0 | .000 | 2 | 27 | 4 | 0 | 4 | 0 | 2 | 27 |
| Pennsylvania | 6 | 1 | 4 | 1 | .250 | 6 | 23 | 8 | 1 | 5 | 2 | 8 | 28 |
| Princeton | 13 | 8 | 5 | 0 | .615 | 35 | 20 | 18 | 12 | 6 | 0 | 63 | 28 |
| Rensselaer | 5 | 2 | 3 | 0 | .400 | 5 | 31 | 5 | 2 | 3 | 0 | 5 | 31 |
| Saint Michael's | – | – | – | – | – | – | – | – | – | – | – | – | – |
| Syracuse | 2 | 1 | 1 | 0 | .500 | 5 | 11 | 6 | 2 | 4 | 0 | 11 | 24 |
| Union | 4 | 2 | 2 | 0 | .500 | 13 | 10 | 5 | 3 | 2 | 0 | 18 | 12 |
| Williams | 11 | 2 | 7 | 2 | .273 | 11 | 22 | 13 | 4 | 7 | 2 | 18 | 24 |
| Yale | 15 | 14 | 1 | 0 | .933 | 60 | 12 | 23 | 18 | 4 | 1 | 80 | 33 |
| YMCA College | 6 | 1 | 5 | 0 | .167 | 6 | 39 | 7 | 2 | 5 | 0 | 11 | 39 |

1923–24 Triangular Hockey League standings
| | Conference | | | | | | | | Overall | | | | | |
| | GP | W | L | T | PTS | SW | GF | GA | GP | W | L | T | GF | GA |
|---|---|---|---|---|---|---|---|---|---|---|---|---|---|---|
| Yale * | 5 | 4 | 1 | 0 | .800 | 2 | 15 | 6 | 23 | 18 | 4 | 1 | 80 | 33 |
| Harvard | 4 | 2 | 2 | 0 | .500 | 1 | 7 | 12 | 18 | 6 | 10 | 2 | – | – |
| Princeton | 5 | 1 | 4 | 0 | .200 | 0 | 8 | 12 | 18 | 12 | 6 | 0 | 63 | 28 |
* indicates conference champion

== Schedule and results ==
| Date | Opponent | Site | Result | Record |
Regular season
| December 15 | Aura Lees* | Boston Arena • Boston, Massachusetts | L ? | 0–1–0 |
| December 18 | vs. Boston University* | Boston Arena • Boston, Massachusetts | W 8–1 | 1–1–0 |
| December 21 | McGill* | Boston Arena • Boston, Massachusetts | L 0–2 | 1–2–0 |
| January 3 | Toronto* | Boston Arena • Boston, Massachusetts | L 1–2 | 1–3–0 |
| January 5 | Toronto* | Boston Arena • Boston, Massachusetts | L 1–4 | 1–4–0 |
| January 9 | vs. MIT* | Boston Arena • Boston, Massachusetts | W 7–0 | 2–4–0 |
| January 14 | Maple Athletic Association* | Boston Arena • Boston, Massachusetts | T 1–1 ^{2OT} | 2–4–1 |
| January 19 | at Princeton | Hobey Baker Memorial Rink • Princeton, New Jersey | W 4–2 | 3–4–1 (1–0–0) |
| January 24 | Maple Athletic Association* | Boston Arena • Boston, Massachusetts | L 1–3 ^{OT} | 2–5–1 |
| January 30 | vs. Boston University* | Boston Arena • Boston, Massachusetts | W 5–0 | 4–5–1 |
| February 9 | Yale | Boston Arena • Boston, Massachusetts (Rivalry) | L 0–3 | 4–6–1 (1–1–0) |
| February 13 | vs. Boston Athletic Association* | Boston Arena • Boston, Massachusetts | L 1–8 | 4–7–1 |
| February 18 | Princeton | Boston Arena • Boston, Massachusetts | W 2–1 ^{2OT} | 5–7–1 (2–1–0) |
| February 20 | Hamilton* | Boston Arena • Boston, Massachusetts | W 5–2 | 6–7–1 |
| February 23 | Dartmouth* | Boston Arena • Boston, Massachusetts | L 3–4 | 6–8–1 |
| March 1 | at Yale | New Haven Arena • New Haven, Connecticut (Rivalry) | L 1–6 | 6–9–1 (2–2–0) |
| ? | ? | ? | L ? | |
| ? | ? | ? | T ? | |
*Non-conference game.
