= William J. O'Brien (politician) =

American politician from Maryland (1836–1905)

Representative William James O'Brien
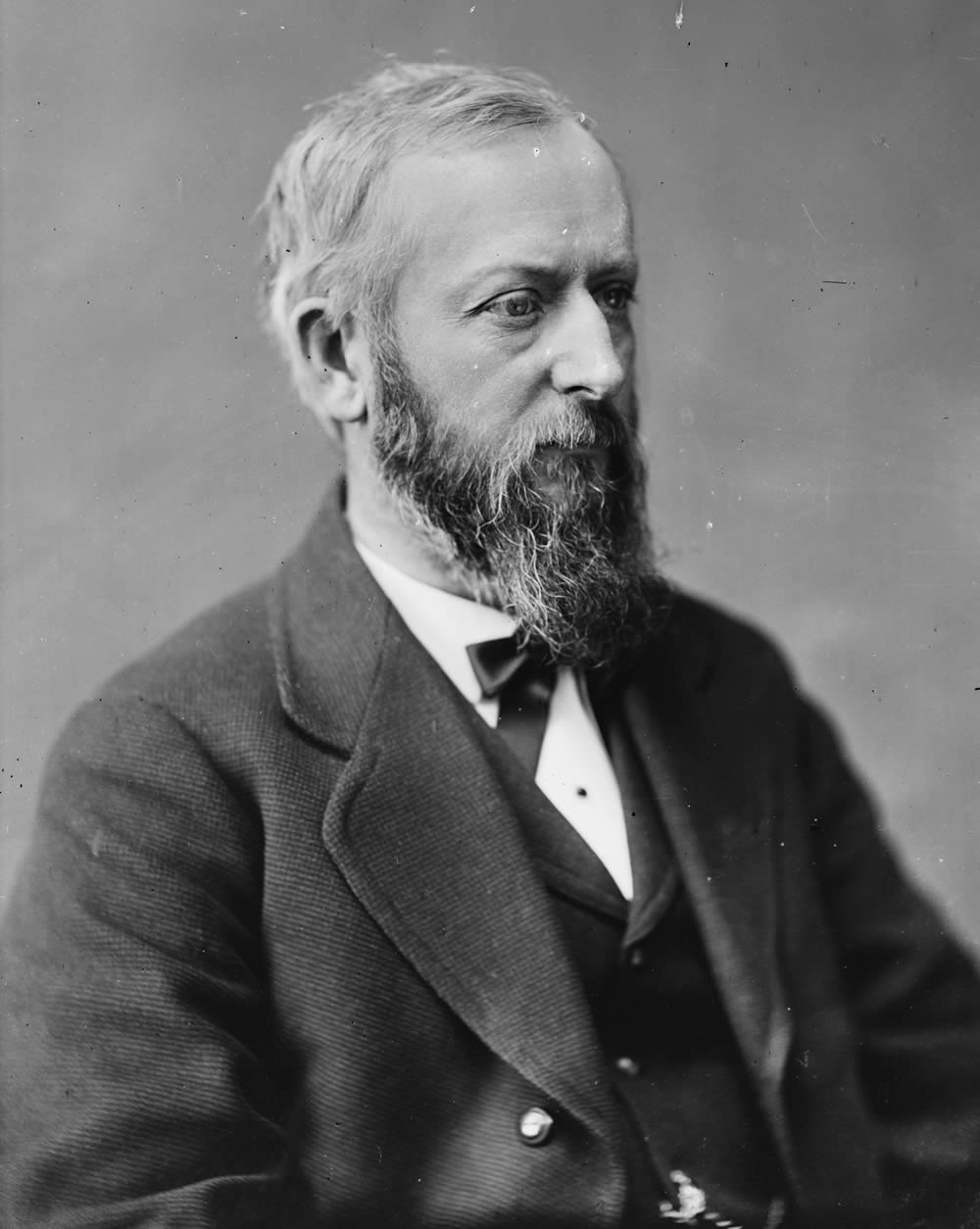

Member of the U.S. House of Representatives from Maryland's 3rd congressional district
- In office March 4, 1873 – March 3, 1877
- Preceded by: Thomas Swann
- Succeeded by: William Kimmel

Personal details
- Born: May 28, 1836 Baltimore, Maryland
- Died: November 13, 1905 (aged 69) Baltimore, Maryland
- Party: Democratic
- Children: Frederick O'Brien; Rev. Richard A. O'Brien
- Education: St. Mary's Seminary
- Profession: Attorney

William James O'Brien (May 28, 1836 – November 13, 1905) was a U.S. Congressman from the third district of Maryland, serving two terms from 1873 until 1877.

Born in Baltimore, Maryland, O'Brien attended the common schools and pursued classical studies in the old St. Mary's College of Baltimore. He studied law, and was admitted to the bar in 1858, commencing practice in Baltimore.

He was elected as a Democrat to the Forty-third and Forty-fourth Congresses, serving from March 4, 1873, until March 3, 1877, but was not a candidate for renomination in 1876.

After Congress, O'Brien resumed the practice of law in Baltimore, and was appointed in 1901 and elected in 1903 as judge of the orphans' court of Baltimore, serving in that capacity until his death in Baltimore in 1905. He is interred in Bonnie Brae Cemetery.

O'Brien's son was travel author Frederick O'Brien.

U.S. House of Representatives
Preceded by Thomas Swann	U.S. Congressman from the 3rd district of Maryland; 1873–1877	Succeeded by William Kimmel
