= Frederick O'Brien =

American journalist

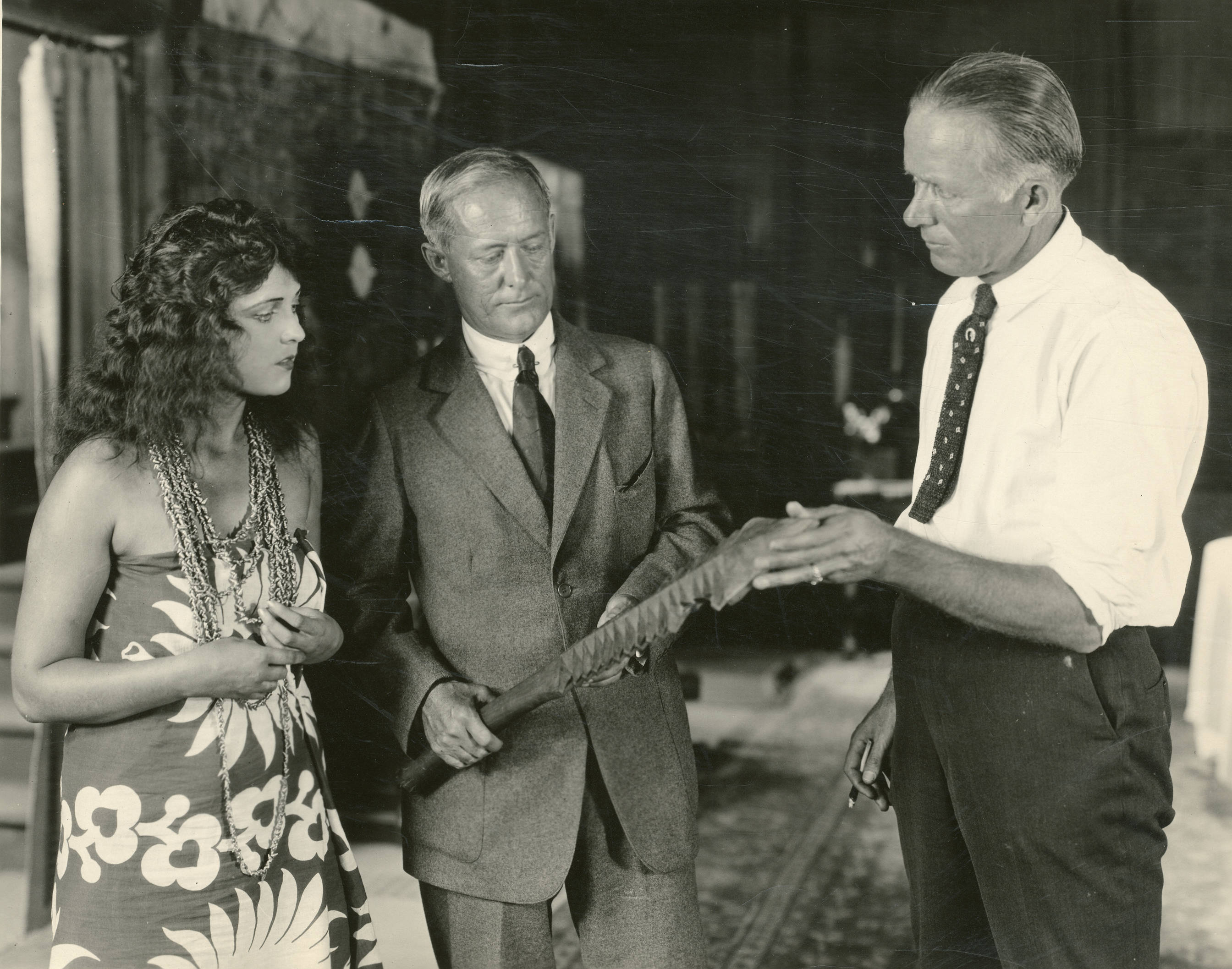
- Actress Jacqueline Logan, Frederick O'Brien, and director George Melford on the set of the film Ebb Tide (1922)
- Born: June 16, 1869; Baltimore, Maryland
- Died: January 9, 1932 (aged 62); San Francisco, California
- Spouse: Gertrude Harriman Frye (m. 1897)
- Relatives: William J. O'Brien (father); Rev. Richard A. O'Brien (brother)

Frederick O'Brien (16 June 1869 – 9 January 1932) was an American author, journalist, hobo, peripatetic world traveler, and public administrator. He wrote three best-selling travel books about French Polynesia between 1919 and 1922: White Shadows in the South Seas, Mystic Isles of the South Seas, and Atolls of the Sun. A movie was made in 1928 of White Shadows in the South Seas.

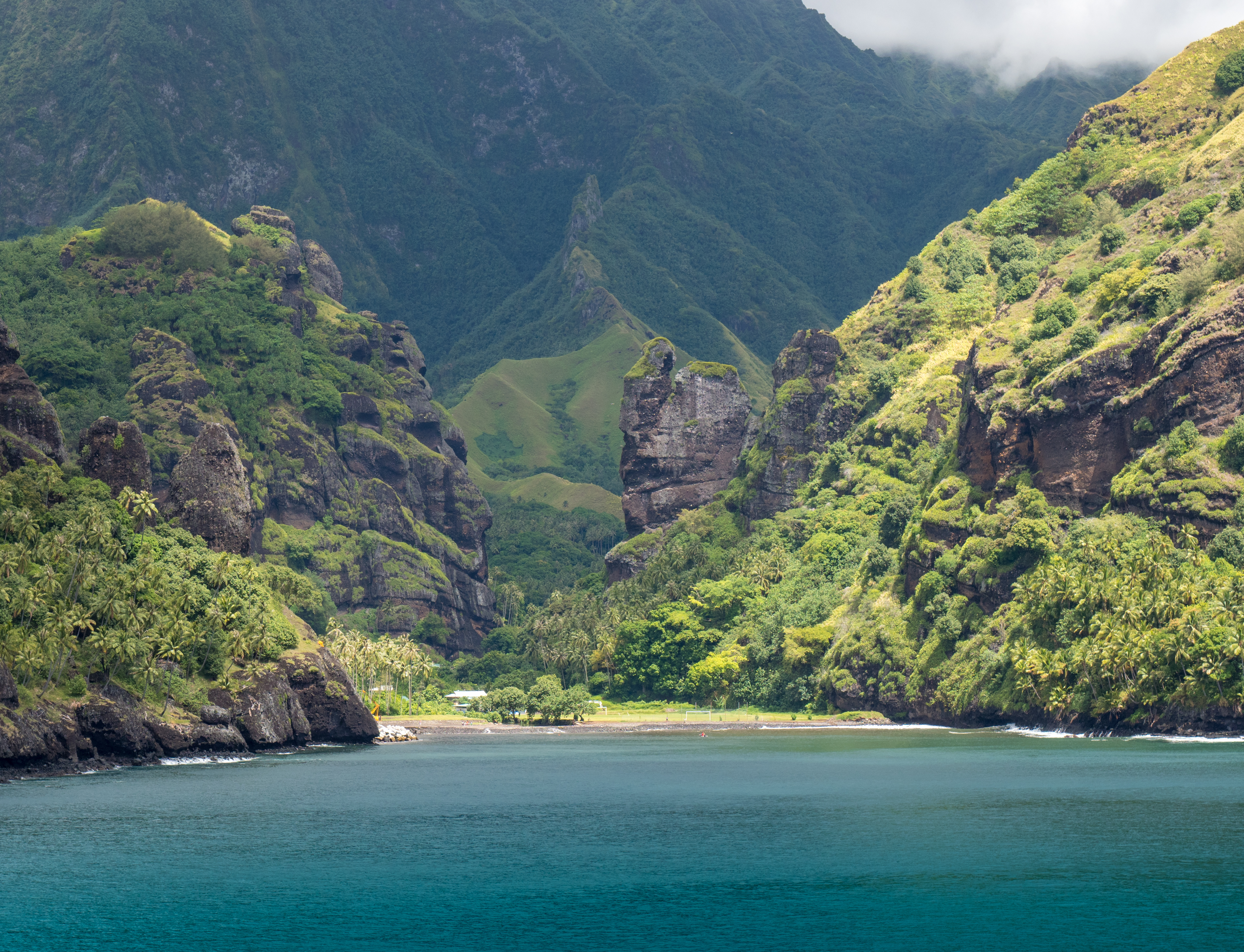
Hanavave, the "Bay of Virgins," on Fatu Hiva. O'Brien crossed the island on foot.

== Early life ==
Frederick O'Brien was born in 1869 in Baltimore into a comfortable Irish Catholic family. Family beliefs tended to leftist activism and outrage over social injustice. He referred to his devout sister Mary as a Catholic Trotskyite for her radicalism. Following three years at Loyola Jesuit College, he dropped out to travel. He spent 1887 exploring Venezuela and Brazil by foot, and worked in asphalt pits in Trinidad. Returning home, he studied law briefly, "plodding through irksome duties as a law clerk." Setting out again as a self-proclaimed hobo, he traveled throughout the States. He worked as a reporter for future U.S. president Warren Harding's newspaper in Marion, Ohio. In 1894 he was a general in Coxey's Army of the unemployed and its march on Washington, D.C. On May 26, 1897, in Chicago, Illinois he married Gertude Harriman Frye. They had no children and soon lived apart.

== Career ==
After Coxey's Army, O'Brien worked mostly as an "accomplished, though itinerant, journalist." He continued to travel about the world. He worked for the Columbus (Ohio) Dispatch, filed articles with such outlets as The Honolulu Advertiser and the San Francisco Chronicle. From 1902 to 1909 he was editor of Cablenews-American in Manila. From 1903 to 1909 he was the East Asian correspondent for the New York Herald, covering events such as the Russo-Japanese War. In 1906–1907, he traveled to Europe, Africa, and Central and South America. His experiences led him to advocate for Philippine Independence and to become anti-imperialistic, opposing U.S. imperial ambitions in the Philippines and Latin America. Returning to California in 1909, he edited newspapers in Riverside and Oxnard, California. In 1913, he journeyed to the remote Marquesas Islands where he spent a year as a beachcomber. Returning to the United States, he served during World War I for the State Food Administration in California and the United States Food Administration in Washington, D.C., working under Herbert Hoover. In 1918-1919 he returned to Manila as publisher of the Manila Times. He visited Tahiti and Samoa in 1921 researching for his next book.

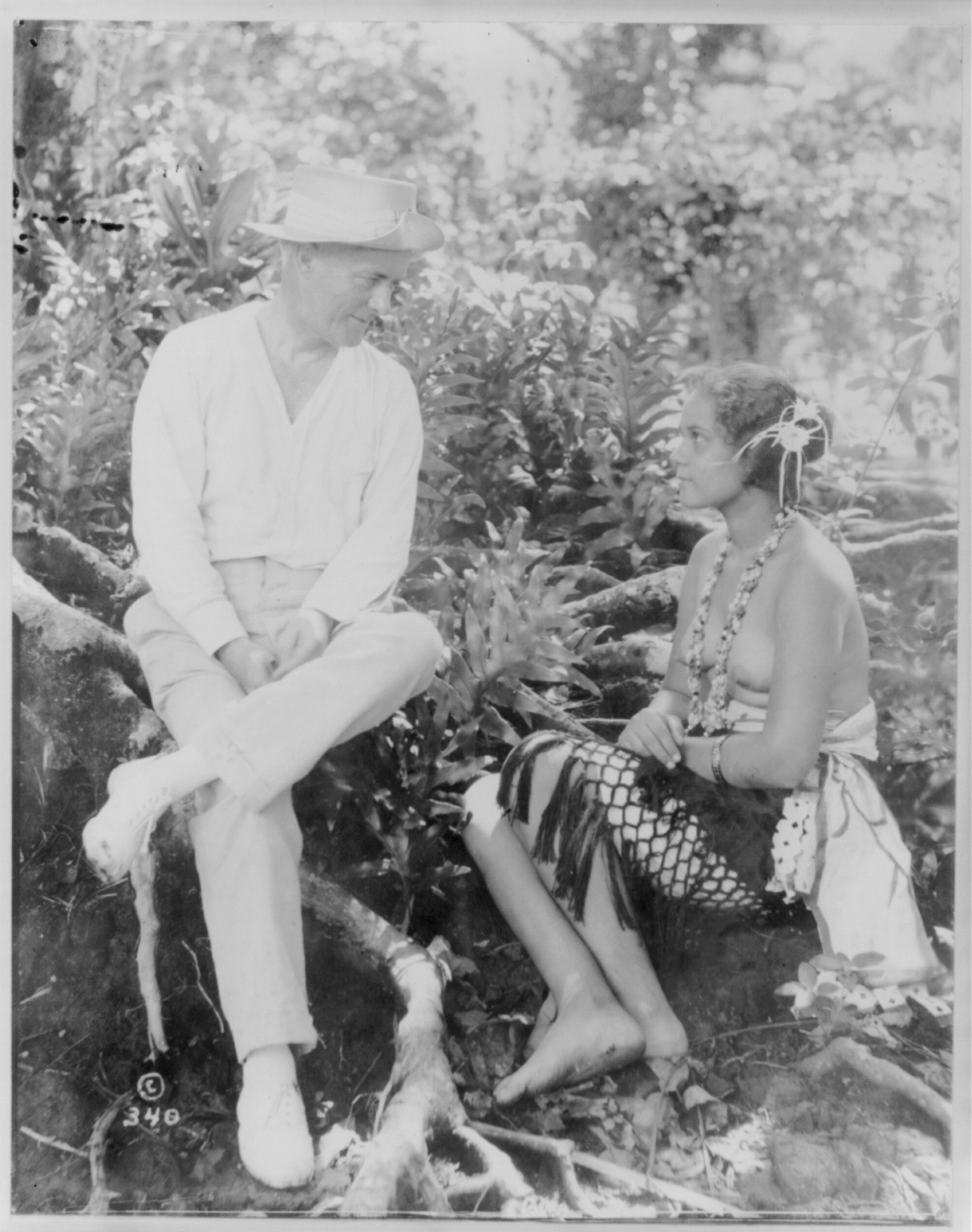
Frederick O'Brien and a Samoan girl (1921).

"I am a Marylander, and first a sailor and then a law student at a university; a laborer, a tramp, a reporter in the United States, Hawaii and the Philippines; a correspondent and traveler in Asia, Africa and Europe; a gardener and keeper of chickens, gold-fish, goats; a beach-comber in the South seas, a political writer, a public utility expert, acting State Food Administrator in California, one of Herbert Hoover's assistants in Washington; always a lover of sunsets on far shores, of books, of sea, of speculations of life and morals, customs and reactions, of merry song and brave deed, and also of being alone"

— O'Brien in an interview, later quoted in The New York Times.

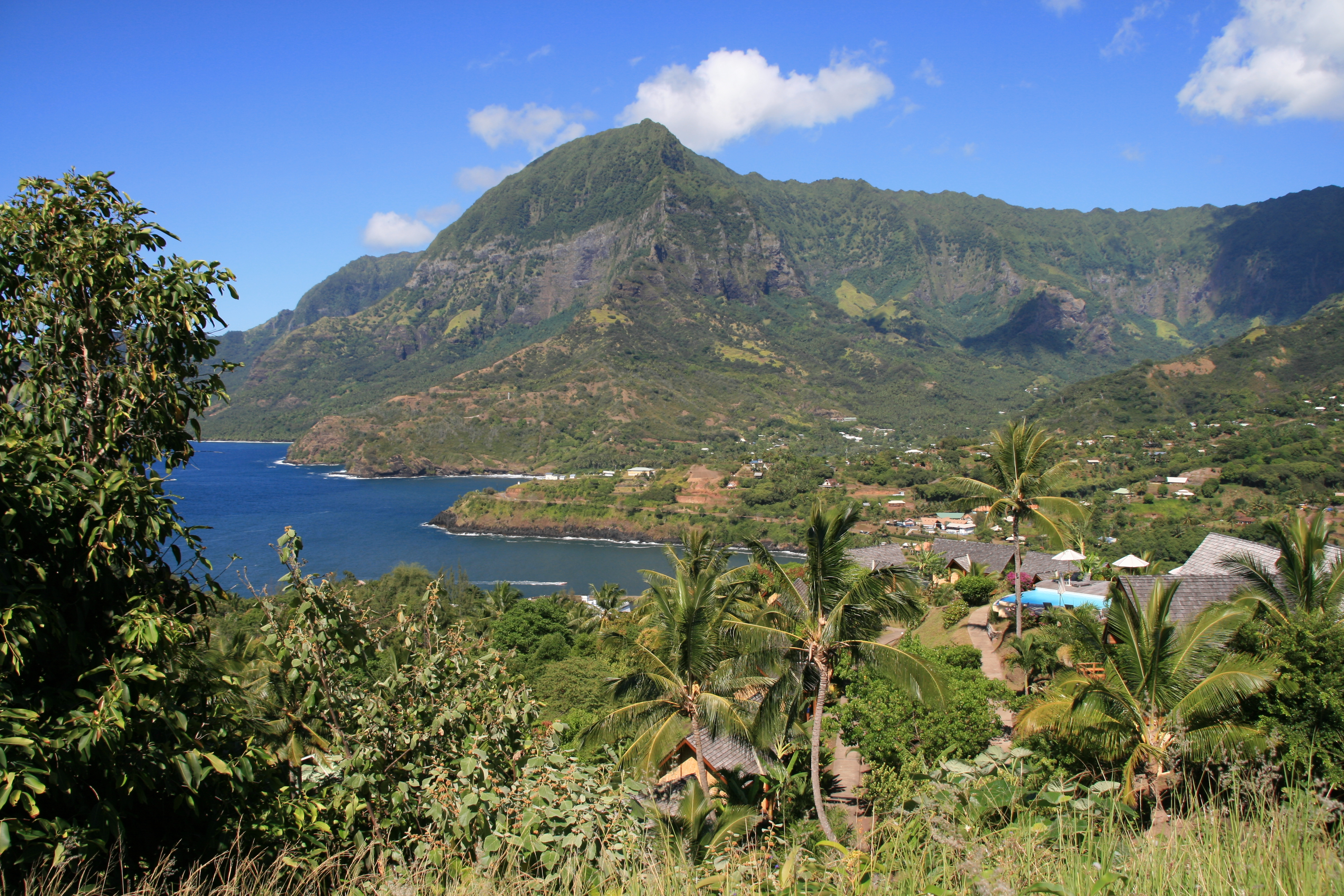
O'Brien lived in the town of Atuona on the island of Hiva Oa during his stay in the Marquesas.

== Author ==
"Where is the boy who has not dreamed of the cannibal isles, those strange fantastic places over the rim of the world, where naked brown men move like shadows through unimaginable jungles and horrid feasts are celebrated to the "boom, boom, boom!" of the 12 foot drums."

— An example of O'Brien's prose.

After his year living in Polynesia, especially the Marquesas, in 1913-1914 O'Brien spent five years attempting to have his story published. With the editorial assistance of aspiring writer Rose Wilder Lane, his first book White Shadows in the South Sea was finally published in 1919. Wilder later sued O'Brien, claiming that she was the ghost writer of White Shadows and deserved co-authorship and half the royalties, a claim with some credibility as O'Brien was a storyteller, rather than a disciplined writer. Also, an excerpt from the book, published in August 1919, listed them as co-authors. The lawsuit was settled out of court.

White Shadows in the South Seas established O'Brien's reputation as a travel writer. Focusing on the remote Marquesas Islands of the south Pacific Ocean, he recounted his visits to islanders still isolated from Western ways, whose life style was free from modern pressures. O'Brien enchanted readers with his skillful depiction of moonlit walks along warm-water beaches, exotic tales and scenes, and photos of bare-breasted Polynesian women. But in the native areas impacted by colonialism, he also found disease and loss of cultural vitality. The book was described "as a bitter denunciation of white civilization and its destructive effects on the lifestyles and cultural traditions of a Polynesian paradise." Despite the serious underpinning, the book became a best seller. In 1928, directors Robert Flaherty and W.S. Van Dyke made a motion picture version of the book that remained true to the exotic, but dystopian theme.

O'Brien's second book, Mystic Isles of the South Seas (1921) was set on the islands of Tahiti and Moorea in the Society Islands. The date of his visit to the Society Islands was in early 1914, which is established by his meeting with poet Rupert Brooke who was there at this time. His third book, Atolls of the Sun, (1922) was set in the Tuamotu Islands, a large group of low-lying atolls in the Pacific Ocean, and the Marquesas. Atolls was not "entirely successful" with reviews suggesting that O'Brien had run out of ideas. While writing these books, O'Brien lived at times with writer Charmian Kittredge London at her ranch. Widow of Jack London, she assisted him as an editor and encouraged his efforts. A woman of many lovers, he was the one man whom she loved after the death of London. Fame as an author did not come easily to O'Brien. As one observer noted, "he didn't love writing. He didn't get from it the joy of the artist in full swing. He was essentially a talker. He thrilled to the response of his listeners. As he went on repeating his stories he would make them finer."

== Importance ==
The San Francisco Call and Post said that O'Brien's three books were "more successful than almost any other travel books of our time." The Oxford Companion to American Literature credits him with reviving interest in Herman Melville who also wrote about the Marquesas and "inspiring a host of imitators exploiting the glamour of the Pacific Islands." The movie based on his book was well received. However, O'Brien's prominence quickly receded into obscurity and in 1955 his name was dropped from the standard reference book American Authors.

== Later life ==
O'Brien settled in Sausalito, California in 1920 and lived there most of the rest of his life. Journalist Margaret Wickham Watson (1891–1934) was his usual companion, his secretary, and sometimes cited as his wife although the two were never married and O'Brien was never divorced from his first wife. O'Brien became a local radio personality, "displaying his characteristic flair for humor, political commentary, and storytelling." However he was a long-time alcoholic, had growing financial problems and ill health, and "all his artistic creative force had left him." he traveled to Europe in 1923 and 1925, both of them attempting to revive their literary careers. O'Brien wrote more stories about the South Seas and worked on his autobiography and a biography of Father Damien, the priest who lived among the lepers in Molokai, Hawaii. He died of congestive heart failure on January 9, 1932. O'Brien's body was cremated and his ashes were scattered by a friend at the Golden Gate strait on San Francisco Bay.

Watson attempted without success after O'Brien's death to find publishers for his letters and autobiography. In 1934, Watson committed suicide in her apartment in San Francisco by shooting herself in the heart. O'Brien's unfinished and unpublished manuscripts disappeared with her death.
