= Charles L. Foote =

American ice hockey player and coach

Biographical details
- Born: May 15, 1893
- Died: March 27, 1975 (aged 81)
- Education: Massachusetts Institute of Technology

Playing career
- 1912–13: MIT Engineers
- 1913–15: Boston Athletic Association
- 1914–15: Boston Arenas

Coaching career (HC unless noted)
- 1916–17: St. Mark's School
- 1923–25: Boston College

Head coaching record
- Overall: 12-13-3 (NCAA)

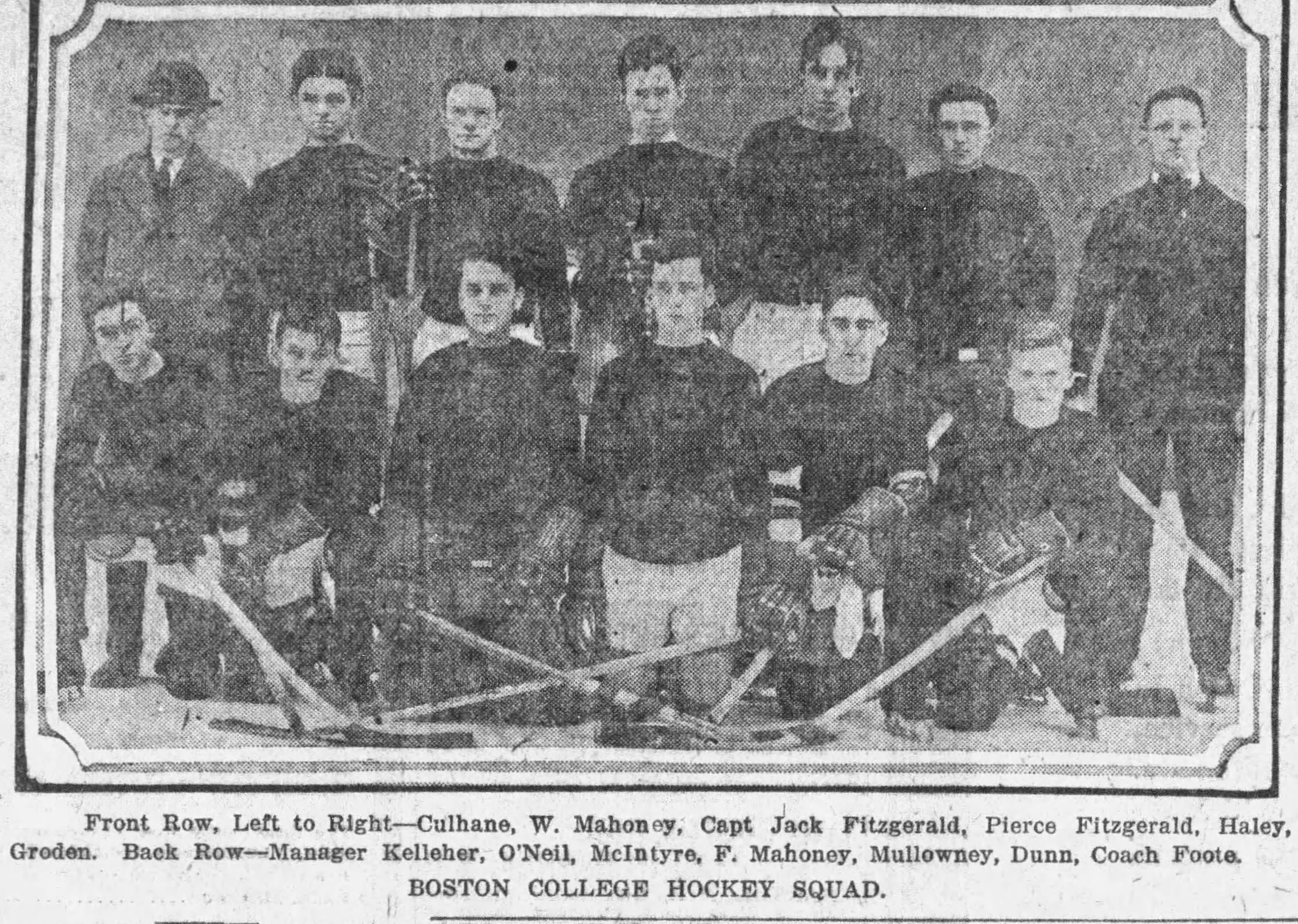
Front row, Left to Right- Culhane, W. Mahoney, Capt. Jack Fitzgerald, Pierce Fitzgerald, Haley, Groden. Back row-Manager Kelleher, O'Neil, McIntyre, F. Mahoney, Mullowney, Dunn, Coach Foote.

Charles Lincoln Foote (May 15, 1893 – March 27, 1975) was an American ice hockey player and coach who served as head coach of the Boston College Eagles men's ice hockey team from 1923 to 1925.

== Hockey ==
=== Playing ===
Foote was a two time Boston Globe All-Scholastic player at Newton High School in Newton, Massachusetts and was team captain his senior season. He attended the Massachusetts Institute of Technology, where he played for the MIT Engineers men's ice hockey team. In 1913, Foote joined the Boston Athletic Association's hockey team. He also played for the Boston Arenas. In February 1915, Foote joined an automobile ambulance corps, however illness prevented him from going overseas.

=== Coaching ===
In 1916, Foote succeeded Fred Rocque as head coach at St. Mark's School. In his first season, Foote led the hockey team to a private school championship. In 1923, he succeeded Rocque as head coach of the Boston College Eagles men's ice hockey team. He compiled a 12-13-3 record over two seasons at BC.

== Business career ==
Foote worked Sherwood, Inc., Industrial Sound Pictures, and the United-Carr Fastener Company. During World War II he was the state pricing officer and acting regional administrator for the Office of Price Administration. In 1948 he joined H. M. Sawyer & Son Company as general manager. In 1953, he succeeded the deceased Howard M. Sawyer as president. In 1955, he led a group that purchased the company from the Sawyer estate. In 1956, H. M. Sawyer merged with two other rainwear and protective clothing companies, A. J. Tower Company and J. F. Carter Company, to form Sawyer-Tower Inc. Foote served as president of the new company.
