= William Kimmel =

American politician (1812–1886)

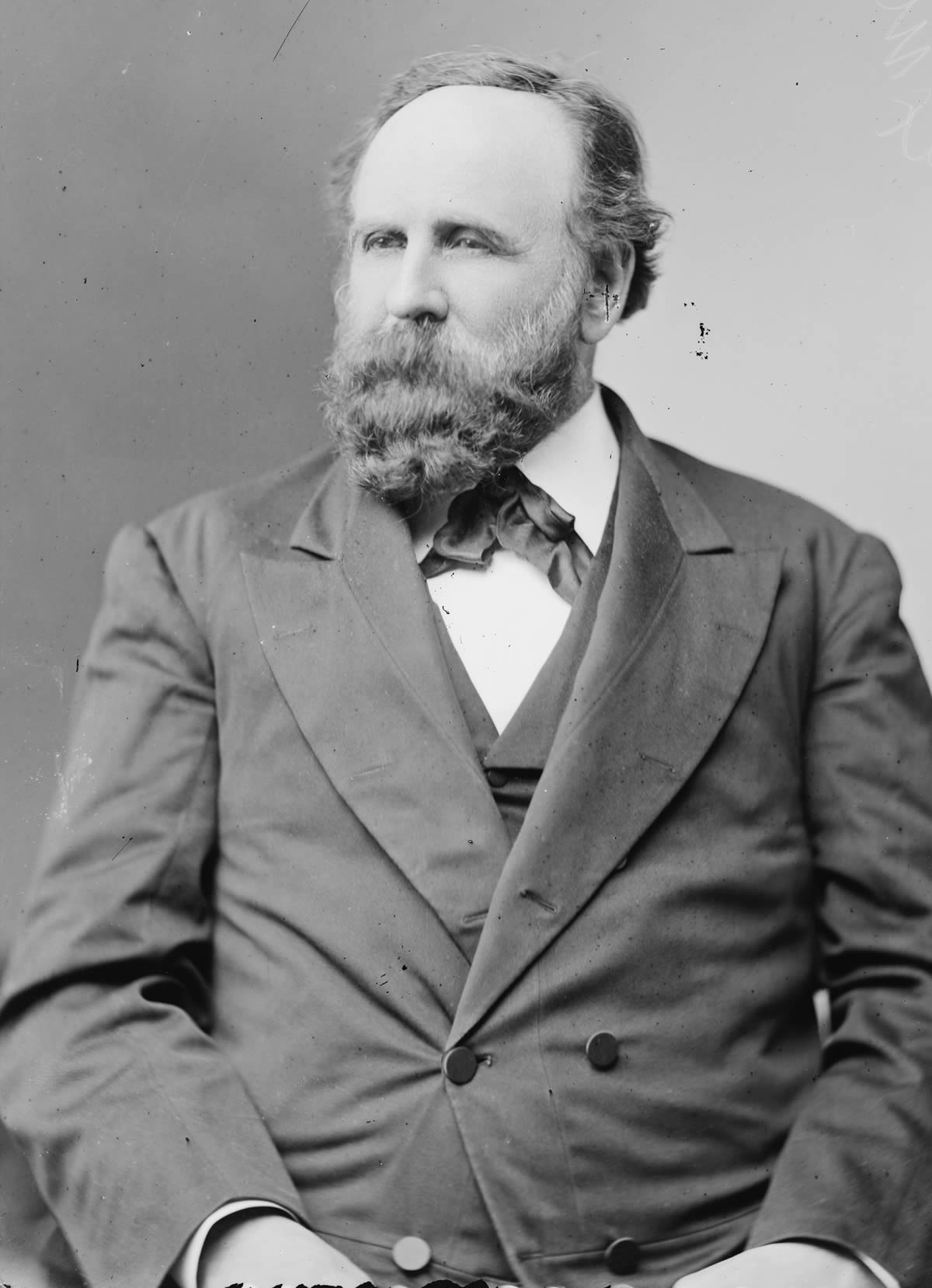
William Kimmel

William Kimmel (August 15, 1812 – December 28, 1886) was a U.S. Congressman from the third district of Maryland, serving two terms from 1877 to 1881.

Kimmel was born in Baltimore, Maryland, and attended St. Mary’s College and Baltimore College. He studied law, and was admitted to the bar, commencing practice in Baltimore. He became interested in agricultural and business pursuits, and served as State director of the Baltimore and Ohio Railroad, director in the Union Railroad company, and in the Western Maryland extension.

Kimmel served as a member of the State Democratic committee from 1862 to 1866, and as a delegate to the Democratic National Convention in 1864. He was an unsuccessful candidate for election in 1864 to the Thirty-ninth Congress, and served as a member of the Maryland State Senate from 1866 until 1871. He served as a director of the Canton Company of Baltimore from 1869 until 1873, and as solicitor and land agent of the company in 1871 and 1872.

Kimmel was elected as a Democrat to the Forty-fifth and Forty-sixth Congresses (serving March 4, 1877—March 3, 1881). He resumed the practice of his profession in Baltimore, and died there in 1886. He is interred in Loudon Park Cemetery.

U.S. House of Representatives
| Preceded by William J. O'Brien | U.S. Congressman from the 3rd district of Maryland; 1877–1881 | Succeeded by Fetter Hoblitzell |
