= Francis Reynolds (priest) =

Francis Cocks Puget Reynolds was Archdeacon of Bombay from 1855 until his death on 28 July 1859.

Reynolds was educated at St John's College, Cambridge and ordained in 1841. After a curacy at Denton, Norfolk he was Chaplain to HEICS until his appointment as Archdeacon.
