= Francis Esmond Reynolds =

British pathologist and author

Francis Esmond Reynolds FRSE (1882–1967) was a 20th-century British pathologist and medical author.

== Birth and education ==
Esmond Reynolds was born in Ilkley in Yorkshire on 17 July 1882. His family moved to Birmingham whilst he was still young. He was educated at King Edward's School, Birmingham.

He studied medicine at Edinburgh University, qualifying as a Licentiate in Midwifery of the Coombe Hospital in Dublin in 1907, and graduating MB, ChB in 1908. He then undertook postgraduate studies under Prof Wassermann in Berlin, and in Brussels. He was employed as Assistant to the Professor of Pathology in Edinburgh, 1911–1912.

== Career ==
In 1913 he was appointed Senior Medical Officer, Taheiho in China, and joined the Manchurian Plague Prevention Service in May, 1913, to commence work as Bacteriologist, stationed at Harbin. He resigned in December 1914, to return to Europe to join the armed forces.

He attained the rank of captain in the Yorkshire Hussars and Royal Army Medical Corps during the First World War, serving in Salonika, the Caucasus, and Asia Minor with the 27th Division. For a time he commanded the 28th Mobile Bacteriological Laboratory at Baku.

During 1919-1920 he held the appointment of Professor of Pathology in the Qasr El Eyni School of Medicine, Cairo, before returning to Edinburgh to join the Department of Pathology in the University as Senior Lecturer under Professor Lorrain Smith. He was remembered as a successful teacher of undergraduates who made a considerable impression on his students. He was also an eminent histopathologist. Subsequently, he was appointed Director of the Scottish Mental Hospitals' Laboratory and first Lecturer on Neuropathology in Edinburgh University.

He received a Diploma in Tropical Medicine and Hygiene (DTMH) from Cambridge University in 1920, and ten years later, in 1930, was elected MRCP, Edinburgh and awarded the MD (Edinburgh), with Gold Medal. In 1928 he was elected a member of the Harveian Society of Edinburgh.

In March, 1932, he was appointed Pathologist at Stobhill Hospital and other general hospitals controlled by the Glasgow Corporation.

He was elected a Fellow of the Royal College of Physicians of Edinburgh in 1937.

In 1941 he was elected a Fellow of the Royal Society of Edinburgh. His proposers were Edward Hindle, John Walton, John Glaister and George Walter Tyrrell.

== Personal life and death ==
Reynolds was married in St Giles Cathedral, Edinburgh on 17 November 1926 to Caroline Mary Bruce Balfour.

He died in Rothesay on 10 April 1967.

== Publications ==
- Reynolds, F.E., "On the Results Obtained by the Weil-Felix Reaction for Typhus Fever at the Garrison of Baku during the Period March–July 1919, Inclusive" in Journal of the Royal Army Medical Corps (vol. 35) (London, 1920), p. 25.
- Reynolds, F.E., "A Study of the Pathology of a Case of Glioma Cerebri," in Brain (vol. 52, issue 4) (1 December 1929), pp. 436–441.
- Reynolds, F. E., and Slater, J. K., "A Contribution to the Pathology of the Later Manifestations of Encephalitis Lethargica" in Journ. of Neur. and Psychopath (January, 1930).
- Reynolds, F.E. & Slater, J.K., "Über die Pathologie der Gliome" in Virchows Arch. path Anat. (1931) 282: 772.
- Turner, A. L. and Reynolds, F. E., Intracranial Pyogenic Diseases. 1931. Edinburgh, Oliver & Boyd.
