= Alex Sayles =

American ice hockey player and coach (1903–1967)

Biographical details
- Born: April 8, 1903; Manhattan, New York, US
- Died: April 27, 1967 (aged 64)
- Education: Princeton University

Playing career

Ice hockey
- 1922–1923: Princeton (freshmen)
- 1923–1924: Princeton
- 1925–1927: Boston Hockey Club

Coaching career (HC unless noted)
- 1925–1927: Phillips Academy
- 1927–1929: Pomfret School
- 1929–1932: Williams

Head coaching record
- Overall: 15–13–2 (.533)

Alexander Sayles (April 8, 1903 – April 27, 1967) was an American ice hockey player and coach in the 1920s and 30s.

== Playing career ==
Raised in New York City, Sayles graduated from Phillips Academy in 1922. While there he was a member of several athletic clubs but it was the ice hockey team that would garner him the most fame. He began attending Princeton University that following fall and was a star for the freshman team. he joined the varsity as a sophomore and was one of the top scorers for the Tigers, helping the team compile a good record in 1923–24. After incurring a few injuries during the year, Sayles withdrew from the team to focus on his studies and graduated a year early in 1925.

== Coaching career ==
Sayles returned to his alma mater and served as the head coach for Phillips for two years. During that time he was also a member of the Boston Hockey Club, one of the top amateur teams at the time. After two seasons, he assumed a similar role with the Pomfret School before accepting a job as the head coach for Williams in 1929. Sayles led the Ephs for three seasons resigning in 1932.

== Career statistics ==
=== Regular season and playoffs ===
			Regular season					Playoffs
Season	Team	League	GP	G	A	Pts	PIM	GP	G	A	Pts	PIM
1922–23	Princeton (freshman)	Independent	—	—	—	—	—	—	—	—	—	—
1923–24	Princeton	THL	—	—	—	—	—	—	—	—	—	—
1925–26	Boston Hockey Club	USAHA	—	—	—	—	—	—	—	—	—	—
1926–27	Boston Hockey Club	USAHA	—	—	—	—	—	—	—	—	—	—

Note: assists were not an official statistic or were recorded infrequently.

== Head coaching record ==
=== Ice hockey ===
Record table
Season	Team	Overall	Conference	Standing	Postseason
Williams Ephs Independent (1929–1932)
1929–30	Williams	4–4–1			
1930–31	Williams	6–6–1			
1931–32	Williams	5–3–0			
Williams:		15–13–2			
Total:		15–13–2			
National champion Postseason invitational champion Conference regular season champion Conference regular season and conference tournament champion Division regular season champion Division regular season and conference tournament champion Conference tournament champion
