= Frances Reynolds (academic) =

Assyriologist

Frances Reynolds is a Shillito Fellow in Assyriology at the Oriental Institute St Benet's Hall, Oxford. Her speciality is in Babylonian and Assyrian intellectual history, literature and religion, with an emphasis on the late second and first millennia BC.

Reynolds was a consultant for the BBC2 series Divine Women (2011) and the BBC series History of the World (2011–12). From 1998 she has been an honorary Research Fellow in Assyriology at the University of Birmingham.

== Selected publications ==
- Reynolds, Frances (2007), "Luxury Goods in the Ancient Near East", Antiquity, 81 (312), Antiquity, v81 n312: 465–467, doi:10.1017/S0003598X0009534X
- Reynolds, Frances; Project, Neo-Assyrian Text Corpus; Orient-Gesellschaft, Deutsche (2003), State archives of Assyria / Volume XVIII. The Babylonian correspondence of Esarhaddon and letters to Assurbanipal and Sin-šarru-iškun from Northern and Central Babylonia / edited by Frances Reynolds; with contributions by Simo Parpola; illustrations edited by Julian Reade, Helsinki University Press, ISBN 9789515700025
- Reynolds, Frances; Birmingham, University of (1994), Esoteric Babylonian Learning : a First Millennium Calendar Text, University of Birmingham, OCLC 757061767
