= Fred Rocque =

Canadian ice hockey coach

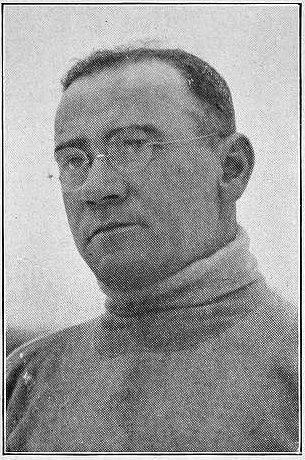
- Rocque in 1923

Biographical details
- Born: April 22, 1880; Sherbrooke, Quebec, Canada
- Died: February 5, 1956 (aged 75); Somerville, Massachusetts, U.S.

Coaching career (HC unless noted)

Hockey
- 1912–1915: Dartmouth
- 1914–1916: Boston Arenas
- 1916–1917: Yale
- 1920–1923: Boston College
- 1922–1923: Boston Athletic Association
- 1923–1924: Minneapolis Millers
- 1924–1925: Minneapolis Rockets
- 1925–1927: Boston College

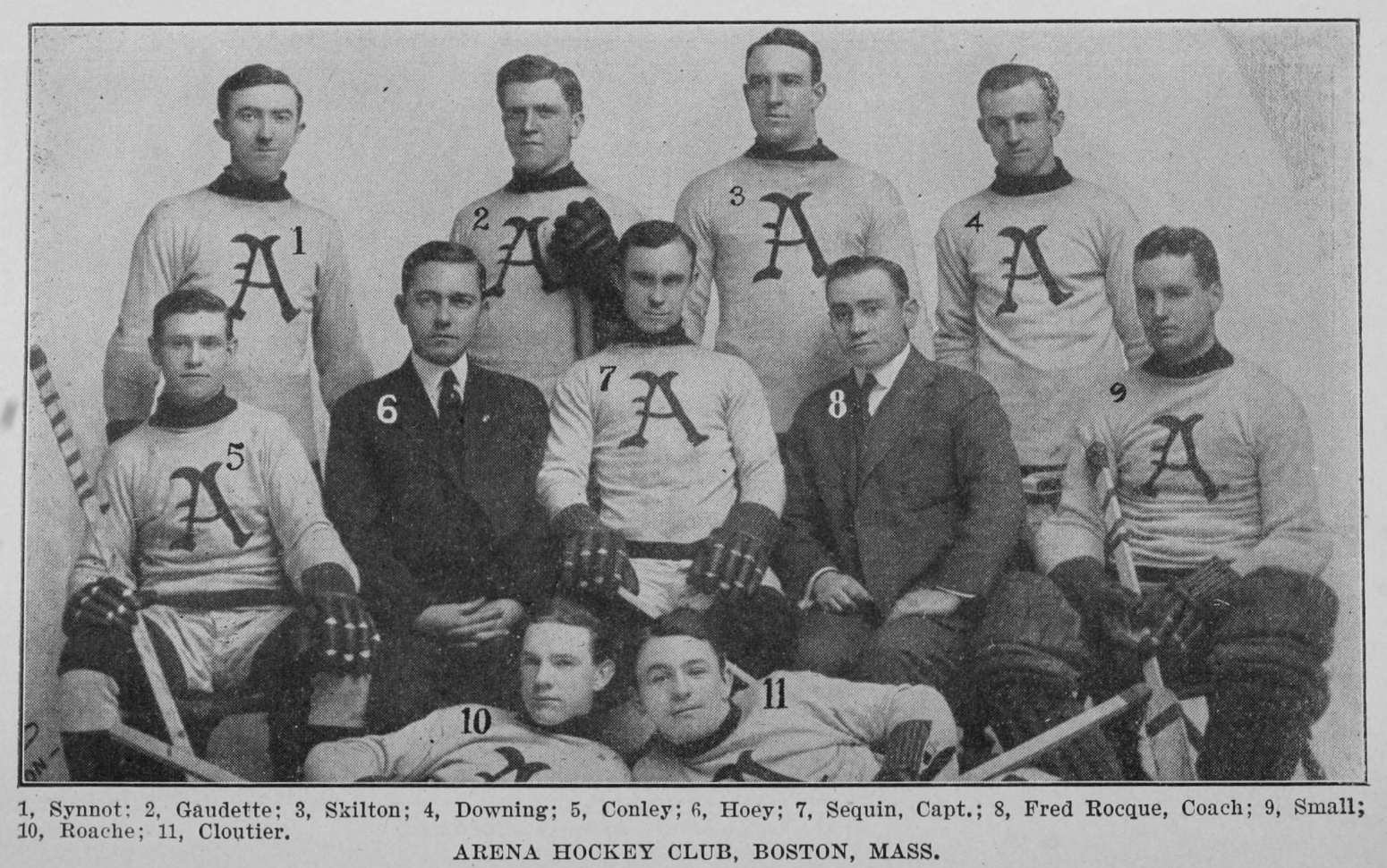
Rocque (pictured as #8) with the Boston Arenas during the 1914–15 season.

Napoleon Frederick Rocque (April 22, 1880 – February 5, 1956) was a Canadian ice hockey coach who was active in the United States during the 1910s and 1920s.

== Career ==
Born in Sherbrooke, Rocque played ice hockey as a goaltender in his hometown in Canada before moving to the United States.

Rocque coached hockey at two Ivy League schools: Dartmouth and Yale. At Dartmouth, he coached the likes of Clarence Wanamaker and Lawrence Whitney. The former would succeed him as head coach at the school, as well as at Yale, though not immediately. After Yale, Rocque moved to Boston College, when he was hired by Francis A. Reynolds. While in Boston, Rocque also coached the Boston Arenas and the Boston Athletic Association Unicorns hockey teams. Between 1923 and 1925 he coached in Minneapolis.

Rocque died in Somerville on February 5, 1956, from injuries sustained in an accident six days earlier.

== Head coaching record ==
Statistics overview
Season	Team	Overall	Conference	Standing	Postseason
Dartmouth (IHA) (1912–1913)
1912–13	Dartmouth	8–2–0	1–1–0	2nd	
Dartmouth:		8–2–0	1–1–0		
Dartmouth Independent (1913–1915)
1913–14	Dartmouth	7–2–0			
1914–15	Dartmouth	4–3–0			
Dartmouth:		11–5–0			
Yale Bulldogs Independent (1916–1917)
1916–17	Yale	10–4–0			
Yale:		10–4–0			
Boston College Eagles Independent (1920–1923)
1920–21	Boston College	6–2–0			
1921–22	Boston College	5–3–1			
1922–23	Boston College	12–1–1			
Boston College Eagles Independent (1925–1927)
1925–26	Boston College	6–9–1			
1926–27	Boston College	3–3–0			
Boston College:		32–18–3			
Total:		61–29–3			
National champion Postseason invitational champion Conference regular season champion Conference regular season and conference tournament champion Division regular season champion Division regular season and conference tournament champion Conference tournament champion
