= Sonny Foley =

American athlete, coach, and official (1901–1981)

- Foley in 1928

Biographical details
- Born: October 28, 1901; Cambridge, Massachusetts, U.S.
- Died: January 26, 1981 (aged 79); Concord, Massachusetts, U.S.
- Education: Boston College

Playing career

Hockey
- 1921–25: Boston College
- 1926–27: Providence Reds

Baseball
- 1921–25: Boston College

Football
- 1921: Boston College
- Positions: Center (hockey); Third baseman (baseball); Quarterback (football)

Coaching career (HC unless noted)

Baseball
- 1926–27: Rindge Technical School (Fresh.)
- 1936–67: Cambridge Latin School

Hockey
- 1926–27: Rindge Technical School (Fresh.)
- 1927–36: Rindge Technical School
- 1927–29: Boston College

James H. "Sonny" Foley (October 28, 1901 – January 26, 1981) was an American athlete, coach, and official.

== Playing ==
A native of Cambridge, Massachusetts, Foley was a standout athlete at Cambridge High and Latin School. At Boston College he spent four years as the Eagles starting third baseman in baseball and center in hockey. He was regarded as one of the best fielding third basemen in BC history and one of the best college hockey players of his generation. He also played quarterback for the Boston College Eagles football team his freshman year. After graduating in 1925, Foley played hockey for the semi-pro Pere Marquette and the Providence Reds of the Canadian–American Hockey League.

== Coaching ==
In 1926, Foley was named freshman baseball coach at the Rindge Technical School. He also coached the school's freshman hockey team. In 1927 he was promoted to head coach of the varsity hockey team. Later that year, Boston College, which had adopted a policy of hiring graduates to coach their athletic teams, hired Foley to coach the Boston College Eagles men's ice hockey team. In 1929, Boston College dropped its hockey program due to financial difficulties brought on by the Wall Street Crash. Foley continued to coach hockey at Rindge until 1936, when he became head baseball coach at his alma mater - Cambridge Latin. He remained at Cambridge Latin for 32 years, retiring after the 1967 season. Foley also worked for the city of Cambridge as the submaster of the Wellington and Harrington elementary schools.

== Officiating ==
Foley was a referee in the Canadian–American Hockey League for one year, the Eastern Hockey League for eight years, and for college and high school hockey games for 25 years. He also spent over 20 years as a goal judge at Boston Bruins games.

== Death ==
Foley died unexpectedly on January 26, 1981, at the age of 79. He was survived by five sisters and a brother.
