= 1929–30 Colby Mules men's ice hockey season =

- Conference: Independent
- Home ice: Colby Rink

Record
- Overall: 4–2–1
- Home: 1–0–1
- Road: 3–2–0

Coaches and captains
- Head coach: Bill Millett
- Captain: Red Lovett

The 1929–30 Colby Mules men's ice hockey season was the 9th season of play for the program. The Mules represented Colby College and were coached by Bill Millett in his 1st season.

== Season ==
Prior to the season, Eddie Roundy turned control of the program over to assistant coach, Bill Millett. The team gathered after the Christmas break with the new coach having few returning players. Not only had three lettermen graduated but Snub Pollard was likely out for the year after being injured during the football season. Kenney, Delaware and captain Lovett were back at forward and were supported by a solid cast from last year's freshman team. The defense, on the other hand would have to be completely remade with none of the candidates having any experience, save that of the freshman squad. Colby opened the season on the road, facing down two-time defending state champion Bowdoin. Defying prediction, the Mules took control of the game form the start and barely allowed the home team an opening. The offense looked far better than it had a year before, scoring once per period, but it was on the defensive side that Colby raised eyebrows. Millett had worked wonders with the revamped defense with all four defensemen cycling through to keep their legs fresh. Bowdoin responded with a hard charge in the second period but Dyer stood tall in goal, keeping the Polar Bears off the scoresheet for the entire match. The team was still rising high when they met Bates two days later. The team continued their high level of play but they were stymied by a tremendous performance by the Garnet defense. Lovett didn't get the team on the board until the third period but by then the Blue and Grey were already three goals down. Colby was only able to get 8 shots on goal for the entire 60 minutes while Bates was able to get twice as many opportunities despite playing defense for most of the second half.

The following week, Bowdoin arrived for the rematch and for a great portion of the game, the Polar Bears looked like the better outfit. Colby was out of sorts in the first two periods and allowed the visitors to build a 1–4 lead. Lovett, who had opened the scoring, netted a goal just before the end of the second and that seemed to spark the team needed. Art Howard caged his first of the year after a brilliant passing play and the final minutes of the game saw the home team throw everything they had at the net. After several near-misses, Lovett fired a puck off the rush into the top corner of the net and sent the match into overtime. Neither side had much chance to score in the first overtime but in the second session, Delaware became the hero. The center got ahold of the puck in his own and wound his way behind the Colby cage to pick up speed. By the time he was leaving the zone, Del had a head of steam and the Bowdoin defenders couldn't keep up. Once he got close to the net, Delaware rifles a shot into the top corner for the go-ahead marker. the Bears tried to claim that the puck had hit the side of the net and not gone in but the referee declared it a good goal and it stood as the eventual game-winner. Colby ended its January slate with a second game against Bates. Delaware opened with a goal in the middle of the first before Dyer was besieged by the Bobcat offense. For a great portion of the game, the puck remained in Colby's end but Dyer produced one of the best goaltending performances in program history. He kept the puck out for two periods but, by the third, the team began to tire from their constant defensive posture. The Garnet tied the team in the early part of the third and prompted the team to resume an attack. Unfortunately, the Mules were weary by that point and began to take penalties as they could hardly keep up with the Bobcats. Colby was able to weather the Bates power play and the game looked set for overtime. However, with less than a minute to play, the Bobcat captain broke loose and fired a seeing-eye shot past a sea of bodies into the net. The loss put Colby squarely behind Bates in the state championship standings and they would need help from Bowdoin to have any chance at their first title.

After the exam break, the team returned to the ice and got set for a tight-packed schedule to end the year. Pomerleau and Wilson joined from the freshman team and both made their first appearance in the third meeting with Bowdoin. However it was the absence of Delaware and the Tufts brothers that was a bigger concern for the team. With Wilson starting at center, Lovett got the team off to a good start with a goal and an assist early in the first but from then on the offense was silent. Fortunately, the defense showed out with Howard now playing alongside Draper. The two proved to be a potent combo but it was Dyer in net who save the day with several critical saves in the third. Only once did the puck get past the Colby netminder and he was able to secure the third win over Bowdoin on the season.

The next week the team took a three-game trip through New England. The first match with Vermont was cancelled but they were able to hit the ice against Norwich the following day. Colby got a tougher-than-expected fight from the Cadets but still managed to come out on top. Delaware was back in action and both he and Lovett tallied in the match. Dyer remained a brick wall in goal and stopped every shot sent his way to set a new program record for wins in a season. A match was scheduled with Nashua two days later but there's no mention of what the result was or if it was even played.

The Mules returned home and wrapped up their season with the final game against Bates. Despite having lost to the Bobcats twice, Colby could still earn a state title as the Garnet had lost one of their earlier matches to Bowdoin and still had one remaining. The home team was missing Draper due to an eye injury but had a capable replacement with Wilson. The freshman looked to be the best player on the ice, making up for his lack of experience with blazing speed. He rushed the puck up the ice several times, defying his position and scored the game's opening goal. The second saw a deluge of scoring with Bates racking up two markers before Colby could respond. Lovett and Kenney combined for three goals but the team was even with the Garnet by the end of the period. After a scoreless third period, overtime was needed once more. Bates took a lead in the first 5-minute session and were within minutes of guaranteeing themselves a championship. Wilson had other plans and scored his second of the game in the second overtime period. Both teams desperately search for the championship goal but, as the light was fading, they had to settle for a draw. The tie meant that Colby's only chance of a state title was a loss by Bates in their final game. Unfortunately, the Garnet proved victorious in their finally, consigning the Mules to second place once again.

Lucius H. Stebbins served as team manager.

== Roster ==
No.	Nat.	Player	Class	Pos	Height	Weight	DoB	Hometown	Previous team
	(United States)	Roland S. Delaware	Senior	C			1907-05-12	Augusta, Maine
	(United States)	Herbert K. Draper Jr.	Senior	D			1907-07-16	Canton, Massachusetts
	(United States)	Clarence A. Dyer	Senior	G			1908-11-09	Sumner, Maine
	(United States)	Charles W. Hedderieg	Junior	C				Whitman, Massachusetts
	(United States)	Myron M. Hilton	Sophomore	RW			1908-06-28	Augusta, Maine
	(United States)	Arthur K. Howard	Sophomore	D/C				Waterville, Maine
	(United States)	Thomas J. Kenney	Junior	RW			1907-06-10	Cambridge, Massachusetts
	(United States)	Walter B. Lovett	Junior	LW			1906-03-09	Hudson, Maine
	(United States)	George A. McDonald	Sophomore	D/LW			1911-08-14	Waterville, Maine
	(United States)	Ulric R. Pomerleau	Freshman	F				Waterville, Maine
	(United States)	Hugh K. Tufts	Sophomore	D			1909-06-21	Westboro, Massachusetts
	(United States)	Wendall A. Tufts	Senior	D				Westboro, Massachusetts
	(United States)	Brittan Webster	Sophomore	D				Lexington, Massachusetts
	(United States)	William M. Wilson	Freshman	D/C				Framingham, Massachusetts

== Standings ==
1929–30 Eastern Collegiate ice hockey standings
	Intercollegiate							Overall					
	GP	W	L	T	Pct.	GF	GA	GP	W	L	T	GF	GA
Amherst	9	2	7	0	.222	12	30	9	2	7	0	12	30
Army	10	6	2	2	.700	28	18	11	6	3	2	31	23
Bates	11	6	4	1	.591	28	21	11	6	4	1	28	21
Boston University	10	4	5	1	.450	34	31	13	4	8	1	40	48
Bowdoin	9	2	7	0	.222	12	29	9	2	7	0	12	29
Brown	–	–	–	–	–	–	–	12	8	3	1	–	–
Clarkson	6	4	2	0	.667	50	11	10	8	2	0	70	18
Colby	7	4	2	1	.643	19	15	7	4	2	1	19	15
Colgate	6	1	4	1	.250	9	19	6	1	4	1	9	19
Connecticut Agricultural	–	–	–	–	–	–	–	–	–	–	–	–	–
Cornell	6	4	2	0	.667	29	18	6	4	2	0	29	18
Dartmouth	–	–	–	–	–	–	–	13	5	8	0	44	54
Hamilton	–	–	–	–	–	–	–	8	4	4	0	–	–
Harvard	10	7	2	1	.750	44	14	12	7	4	1	48	23
Massachusetts Agricultural	11	7	4	0	.636	25	25	11	7	4	0	25	25
Middlebury	8	6	2	0	.750	26	13	8	6	2	0	26	13
MIT	8	4	4	0	.500	16	27	8	4	4	0	16	27
New Hampshire	11	3	6	2	.364	20	30	13	3	8	2	22	42
Northeastern	–	–	–	–	–	–	–	7	2	5	0	–	–
Norwich	–	–	–	–	–	–	–	6	0	4	2	–	–
Pennsylvania	10	4	6	0	.400	36	39	11	4	7	0	40	49
Princeton	–	–	–	–	–	–	–	18	9	8	1	–	–
Rensselaer	–	–	–	–	–	–	–	3	1	2	0	–	–
St. John's	–	–	–	–	–	–	–	–	–	–	–	–	–
St. Lawrence	–	–	–	–	–	–	–	4	0	4	0	–	–
St. Stephen's	–	–	–	–	–	–	–	–	–	–	–	–	–
Union	5	2	2	1	.500	8	18	5	2	2	1	8	18
Vermont	–	–	–	–	–	–	–	–	–	–	–	–	–
Villanova	1	0	1	0	.000	3	7	4	0	3	1	13	22
Williams	9	4	4	1	.500	28	32	9	4	4	1	28	32
Yale	14	12	1	1	.893	80	21	19	17	1	1	110	28

== Schedule and results ==
Date	Opponent	Site	Result	Record
Regular Season
January 11	at Bowdoin*	Delta Rink • Brunswick, Maine	W 3–0	1–0–0
January 13	at Bates*	Bartlett Street Rink • Lewiston, Maine	L 1–3	1–1–0
January 20	Bowdoin*	South End Arena • Waterville, Maine	W 5–4 ^{2OT}	2–1–0
January 23	at Bates*	Bartlett Street Rink • Lewiston, Maine	L 1–2	2–2–0
February 11	at Bowdoin*	South End Arena • Waterville, Maine	W 2–1	3–2–0
February 14	at Norwich*	Sabine Field Rink • Northfield, Vermont	W 2–0	4–2–0
February 16	at Nashua*	Sabine Field Rink • Nashua, New Hampshire		
February 18	Bates*	South End Arena • Waterville, Maine	T 5–5 ^{2OT}	4–2–1
*Non-conference game.

Note: Colby records indicate that the team lost two games this season. If the match with Nashua took place, it was either a win or a tie for the Mules.

== Scoring statistics ==
Name	Position	Games	Goals	Assists	Points
Red Lovett	LW	-	9	1	10
Tom Kenney	RW	-	4	1	5
Roland Delaware	C	-	3	1	4
Bill Wilson	D/C	-	2	0	2
Art Howard	D/C	-	1	0	1
Bill Draper	D	-	0	0	0
Snub Dyer	G	-	0	0	0
Charlie Hedderieg	C	-	0	0	0
Myron Hilton	RW	-	0	0	0
George MacDonald	D/LW	-	0	0	0
Ulric Pommerleau	F	-	0	0	0
Hugh Tufts	D	-	0	0	0
Wendall Tufts	D	-	0	0	0
Britt Webster	D	-	0	0	0
Total			19		

Note: Primary assists were reported infrequently.
