= 1929–30 Massachusetts Agricultural Aggies men's ice hockey season =

- Conference: Independent
- Home ice: Alumni Field Rink; Campus Pond

Record
- Overall: 7–4–0
- Home: 3–0–0
- Road: 3–4–0
- Neutral: 1–0–0

Coaches and captains
- Head coach: Lorin Ball
- Captain: Dicky Bond

The 1929–30 Massachusetts Agricultural Aggies men's ice hockey season was the 22nd season of play for the program. The Aggies were coached by Lorin Ball in his 6th season.

== Season ==
After its first good season in many years, MAC was able to put together a schedule with tougher opponents who, coincidentally, had more consistent access to usable ice. To help the team continue its winning ways, all but one of last season's lettermen were returning (minus Robby Nash), though only about fifteen men showed up for tryouts at the beginning of December. With a more experienced team than usual, coach Ball could take his time settling the roster and ended up tabbing Gunness to take over Nash's spot on the blueline. Another new entry to the squad was Herb Forest, younger brother of former team captain Joe Forest.

The first game of the season was set to take place on January 7, however, due to poor ice conditions the match was postponed for a couple of days. When the weather did not improve, the team faced the prospect of a second postponement. Instead of putting the match off a second time, the Aggies were able to secure the Eastern States Coliseum and play on a pristine sheet of ice. Though there was little teamwork in the first two periods, MAC was able to take a 1-goal lead from Forest's first of the year. The team looked much more composed in the third and began to play as a unit. The Aggies kept the puck in the Connecticut end and scored four more goals to walk away with a win. The team then headed out to face off against Hamilton. In the previous six meeting between the two, the Continentals had won every match but the Aggies had been getting closer and closer to the Blue and Buff in recent years. Early on, it appeared as if the streak would continue when Hamilton took a 2-goal lead just seven minutes into the game. However, The Aggies' defense stiffened afterwards and stopped several attempts at increasing the Continental's score. Frost halved the lead a few minutes later and Gunness tied the match just seconds before the buzzer. MAC attacked the Hamilton cage in the third but the Blue netminder played and outstanding period and didn't let anything get behind him. The constant assault did eventually wear down the Hamilton defense and Davis gave the Aggies their first lead early in the third. A solid defensive effort from Bond and Gunness for the remainder of the game allowed just 6 shots on Myrick in the final period, all of which he stopped.

The first extend road trip began with the team traveling to face Army but, due to the weather, the game had to be played at Bear Mountain. Playing in fog that obscured either end of the rink, the MAC defense was unable to stop the attack from Lindquist as the Cadet captain scored 4 goals seemingly by himself. The Aggies had a hard time finding their skating legs and didn't score until the final 22 minutes of the game. Though three Aggie goals were scored, it wasn't enough to complete the comeback and MAC was handed its first loss of the season. Weather remained a problem and a succeeding match with St. Stephen's was cancelled, leaving the team to travel down to Rhode Island and face Brown. Unfortunately, the team played a terrible first period and found itself down 0–4. The Bears coasted in the final two periods and scored three more goals while the Bruno netminder stymied MAC by stopping every shot that came his way. After the embarrassing end to the trip, MAC returned home and had good enough weather to play its first home game of the year. After allowing a goal early, the Aggies redoubled their efforts on the defensive end and put the clamps on the Bates offense. Art Brown, plying in his first game of the year, tied the score just before the end of the first. Frost gave the team the lead in the second and the defense then fended off a desperate band of Bobcats in the third to eke out a victory.

With the team back in the win column, the Aggies headed out on a northern swing and made their first stop in New Hampshire. For a change, MAC took a lead against the Wildcats when Manty scored after stealing the puck. UNH tie the match before the first period was over but neither team could manage score afterwards. A 10-minute overtime was arranges and MAC continued to pour on the offense. It took 5 minutes for Davis to give the lead back to the Aggies, who outshout their opponents 38–18 in the match, and the defense was able to carry the club the rest of the way. Frost was injured in the overtime by a hard blow to the leg but he managed to play in the rematch with Bates the following evening. The Bobcats gave MAC a fight and fired more than 30 shots on goal. Though three got past Myrick, he was credited with keeping his team in the game against a withering attack. The offense was well represented with goals from four different forwards, the final coming from Waechter about halfway through the third.

Almost as soon as the team got back home they were back on the road and the Aggies were off to Boston. The team met Northeastern for a goaltending battle that saw no scoring in the first two periods. A 15-foot shot eluded Myrick and found its way into the net in the third, which turned out to be the only goal of the match. After losing a practice game to a team composed of former college players, led by former captain Jack Hutchinson, MAC renewed their series with cross-town rival Amherst. Forced onto the local pond due to warm weather, MAC attacked the Purple net all evening and never once gave the Sabrinas a chance to score. Herb Forest converted two brilliant passed from Dicky Bond into goals in the first and that was all the offense the team needed. While the Amherst netminder played an outstanding game, the total lack of scoring from the Lord Jeffs doomed the visitors and assured the Aggies a second consecutive winning season. The game was notable for the absence of Gunness, who was replaced on the blueline by Brown.

The next game on the schedule was supposed to be a road trip to Storrs, Connecticut, however, due to no ice on account of the weather, the rematch with the Connecticut Aggies was played on the campus pond in Amherst. The nutmegers were a vastly improved team over the outfit that MAC had faced in the first match of the season. The opposing netminder stopped many good chances from the Maroons in the first two periods, though Frost was able to get one goal at the start of the second. CAC tied the game early in the third, however, just two minutes later, Manty scored the final goal of the game to take season series for the second year in a row. Gunness returned to the lineup, however, with how well Brown had played in on defense, he took over as the starting blueliner while Gunness served as a reserve winger. The final game came a few days later when the team travelled to Williamstown. Though they fought valiantly, it was readily apparent that the Ephs were the better team than the Aggies. Williams held the balance of play in the middle period, scoring three goals to take a commanding lead. Forest and Bond combined to attempt a comeback but it wasn't to be and MAC ended an otherwise successful season with a loss.

Vincent Riley served as team manager.

== Roster ==
No.	Nat.	Player	Class	Pos	Height	Weight	DoB	Hometown	Previous team
	(United States)	Richard H. Bond Jr.	Senior	D				Dover, Massachusetts
	(United States)	Arthur E. Brown	Sophomore	D/C				Dover, Massachusetts
	(United States)	Richard W. Davis	Junior	D/C				Melrose, Massachusetts
	(United States)	Herbert L. Forest	Sophomore	C/LW/RW				Arlington, Massachusetts
	(United States)	Edmund L. Frost	Junior	LW			1908-03-12	Arlington, Massachusetts
	(United States)	Robert C. Gunness	Sophomore	D/LW			1911-07-28	Amherst, Massachusetts
	(United States)	Ernest L. Hayes	Senior	C/LW			1906-08-11	Milton, Massachusetts
	(United States)	Charles W. Manty Jr.	Junior	D/W			1908-07-24	Maynard, Massachusetts
	(United States)	Norman Myrick	Junior	G				Longmeadow, Massachusetts
	(United States)	G. Dean Swift	Senior	D/LW				Melrose, Massachusetts
	(United States)	Peter H. Waechter Jr.	Senior	RW			1909-06-11	Walpole, Massachusetts
	(United States)	Allen J. Warren	Senior	D			1907-05-19	New Haven, Connecticut
	(United States)	Albert P. Zuger	Senior	D/LW			1907-03-11	New Haven, Connecticut

== Standings ==
1929–30 Eastern Collegiate ice hockey standings
	Intercollegiate							Overall					
	GP	W	L	T	Pct.	GF	GA	GP	W	L	T	GF	GA
Amherst	9	2	7	0	.222	12	30	9	2	7	0	12	30
Army	10	6	2	2	.700	28	18	11	6	3	2	31	23
Bates	11	6	4	1	.591	28	21	11	6	4	1	28	21
Boston University	10	4	5	1	.450	34	31	13	4	8	1	40	48
Bowdoin	9	2	7	0	.222	12	29	9	2	7	0	12	29
Brown	–	–	–	–	–	–	–	12	8	3	1	–	–
Clarkson	6	4	2	0	.667	50	11	10	8	2	0	70	18
Colby	7	4	2	1	.643	19	15	7	4	2	1	19	15
Colgate	6	1	4	1	.250	9	19	6	1	4	1	9	19
Connecticut Agricultural	–	–	–	–	–	–	–	–	–	–	–	–	–
Cornell	6	4	2	0	.667	29	18	6	4	2	0	29	18
Dartmouth	–	–	–	–	–	–	–	13	5	8	0	44	54
Hamilton	–	–	–	–	–	–	–	8	4	4	0	–	–
Harvard	10	7	2	1	.750	44	14	12	7	4	1	48	23
Massachusetts Agricultural	11	7	4	0	.636	25	25	11	7	4	0	25	25
Middlebury	8	6	2	0	.750	26	13	8	6	2	0	26	13
MIT	8	4	4	0	.500	16	27	8	4	4	0	16	27
New Hampshire	11	3	6	2	.364	20	30	13	3	8	2	22	42
Northeastern	–	–	–	–	–	–	–	7	2	5	0	–	–
Norwich	–	–	–	–	–	–	–	6	0	4	2	–	–
Pennsylvania	10	4	6	0	.400	36	39	11	4	7	0	40	49
Princeton	–	–	–	–	–	–	–	18	9	8	1	–	–
Rensselaer	–	–	–	–	–	–	–	3	1	2	0	–	–
St. John's	–	–	–	–	–	–	–	–	–	–	–	–	–
St. Lawrence	–	–	–	–	–	–	–	4	0	4	0	–	–
St. Stephen's	–	–	–	–	–	–	–	–	–	–	–	–	–
Union	5	2	2	1	.500	8	18	5	2	2	1	8	18
Vermont	–	–	–	–	–	–	–	–	–	–	–	–	–
Villanova	1	0	1	0	.000	3	7	4	0	3	1	13	22
Williams	9	4	4	1	.500	28	32	9	4	4	1	28	32
Yale	14	12	1	1	.893	80	21	19	17	1	1	110	28

== Schedule and results ==
Date	Opponent	Site	Result	Record
Regular Season
January 9	vs. Connecticut Agricultural*	Eastern States Coliseum • Springfield, Massachusetts	W 5–0	1–0–0
January 11	at Hamilton*	Russell Sage Rink • Clinton, New York	W 3–2	2–0–0
January 16	at Army*	Bear Mountain Rink • Bear Mountain, New York	L 3–5	2–1–0
January 18	at Brown*	Rhode Island Auditorium • Providence, Rhode Island	L 0–7	2–2–0
January 20	Bates*	Alumni Field Rink • Amherst, Massachusetts	W 2–1	3–2–0
January 24	at New Hampshire*	UNH Ice Rink • Durham, New Hampshire	W 2–1 ^{OT}	4–2–0
January 25	at Bates*	Bartlett Street Rink • Lewiston, Maine	W 4–3	5–2–0
January 29	at Northeastern*	Boston Arena • Boston, Massachusetts	L 0–1	5–3–0
February 1	Boston All-Stars*	Alumni Field Rink • Amherst, Massachusetts (Exhibition)	L 4–6	
February 5	Amherst*	Campus Pond • Amherst, Massachusetts	W 2–0	6–3–0
February 10	Connecticut Agricultural*	Alumni Field Rink • Amherst, Massachusetts	W 2–1	7–3–0
February 12	at Williams*	Sage Hall Rink • Williamstown, Massachusetts	L 2–4	7–4–0
*Non-conference game.

Note: most games were played with 20-minute periods.

== Scoring statistics ==
Name	Position	Games	Goals	Assists	Points
Herb Forest	C/LW/RW	11	8	1	9
Charlie Manty	D/LW/RW	11	4	2	6
Luke Frost	LW	11	4	0	4
Dicky Bond	D	11	2	2	4
Pete Waechter	RW	11	2	1	3
Dick Davis	D/C	11	2	1	3
Art Brown	D/C	7	2	0	2
Bob Gunness	D/LW	9	1	1	2
Allen Warren	D	2	0	0	0
Dean Swift	D/LW	3	0	0	0
Al Zuger	D/LW	4	0	0	0
Ernest Hayes	C/LW	5	0	0	0
Norm Myrick	G	11	0	0	0
Total			25	8	33

Note: Assists were reported infrequently.
