= 1929–30 Union Skating Dutchmen ice hockey season =

- Conference: Independent
- Home ice: Ryder Rink

Record
- Overall: 2–2–1
- Home: 2–0–0
- Road: 0–2–1

Coaches and captains
- Head coach: Harold A. Larrabee
- Captain: Jack Beale

The 1929–30 Union Skating Dutchmen men's ice hockey season was the 17th season of play for the program. The Skating Dutchmen represented Union College and were coached by Harold A. Larrabee in his 5th season.

== Season ==
After years of contending with unsuitable conditions at the Central Park Rink, Union officials finally allowed a temporary rink to be built on campus. After the side boards were set up, the flooding began in early December when the weather became cold enough for the ice to form. The rink was able to be built thanks to a gift from H. Russell Ryder and was named in his honor. After practice was well underway, coach Larrabee was invited to represent Union at the hockey rules meeting of the National Collegiate Athletic Association. The meeting was of particular interest as professional hockey had just introduced significant rule changes, particularly with regard to passing and offside. College teams were expected to keep their current rules in place and wait to change until the kinks had been worked out.

Once the team returned from their winter break, they found that the weather was still unkind despite their new home. The opening match with Cornell had to be cancelled due to a lack of ice, which had happened the year before as well. The school staff went to work trying to get the ice into a usable condition. Luckily, a cold spell at the end of the week enabled Union to open the season against Connecticut Agricultural. School President Frank Parker Day was on hand to drop the ceremonial first puck for the new rink and then watch as Union won its first game with a solid performance. With lineup full of veteran players, the Dutchmen attacked the Aggies relentlessly and a pair of goals from Henafelt was more than enough to carry the day. The following evening, the team took on St. John's and, while they faced a tougher opponent, the Dutchmen were no less successful. Two more goals from Henafelt paced all players and Union was off to a fast start with two wins in as many days.

During the exam break, the Garnet travelled up to Vermont to take on Norwich and were locked into a tight battle. Kahn was the only Dutchmen to find the back of the net and the team relied on Foster to keep them in the match. A 10-minute overtime wasn't able to settle matters and, with the light fading, the game was called a draw. The subsequent match with Amherst was cancelled due to poor ice conditions and left the team with little practice time ahead of the game at Cornell. To make matters worse, one of the team's top defensemen, Harry Hedinger, was ruled ineligible for the rest of the year. Forbes was tasked with taking his spot while Savage was set to be used as a replacement for Werle, who was constantly handicapped due to having his stick on the wrong side. Nothing, however, prepared the team for the offensive onslaught that Cornell led with and the Big Red charged out to an insurmountable lead in first. Kahn netted the only goal for the Dutchmen in an otherwise terrible game.

After warm weather caused the cancellation of three more games, the Dutchmen were able to end the season with a trip to Philadelphia. The total lack of ice ahead of the game left the team slow and rusty but they put forth a valiant effort. Union held the Quakers to 2 goals in the first two periods but their lack of conditioning caught up to them in the third when Penn got the puck behind Foster seven different times to turn the match into a route.

== Roster ==
No.	Nat.	Player	Class	Pos	Height	Weight	DoB	Hometown	Previous team
	(United States)	John S. Beale (C)	Senior	D			1908-11-06	Schenectady, New York
		James S. Forbes	Junior	D
		Edward P. Foster Jr.	Junior	G
		John H. B. Hedinger Jr.	Junior	D
		Morton J. Henafelt	Senior	RW			1906-11-03
	(United States)	Arnold W. Kahn	Junior	C			1909-04-07	Waterville, Maine
		Charles C. Savage	Sophomore	RW
		Douglas M. Stewart	Sophomore
		Charles L. P. Townsend	Sophomore	G
		Ira C. Werle	Senior	LW

== Standings ==
1929–30 Eastern Collegiate ice hockey standings
	Intercollegiate							Overall					
	GP	W	L	T	Pct.	GF	GA	GP	W	L	T	GF	GA
Amherst	9	2	7	0	.222	12	30	9	2	7	0	12	30
Army	10	6	2	2	.700	28	18	11	6	3	2	31	23
Bates	11	6	4	1	.591	28	21	11	6	4	1	28	21
Boston University	10	4	5	1	.450	34	31	13	4	8	1	40	48
Bowdoin	9	2	7	0	.222	12	29	9	2	7	0	12	29
Brown	–	–	–	–	–	–	–	12	8	3	1	–	–
Clarkson	6	4	2	0	.667	50	11	10	8	2	0	70	18
Colby	7	4	2	1	.643	19	15	7	4	2	1	19	15
Colgate	6	1	4	1	.250	9	19	6	1	4	1	9	19
Connecticut Agricultural	–	–	–	–	–	–	–	–	–	–	–	–	–
Cornell	6	4	2	0	.667	29	18	6	4	2	0	29	18
Dartmouth	–	–	–	–	–	–	–	13	5	8	0	44	54
Hamilton	–	–	–	–	–	–	–	8	4	4	0	–	–
Harvard	10	7	2	1	.750	44	14	12	7	4	1	48	23
Massachusetts Agricultural	11	7	4	0	.636	25	25	11	7	4	0	25	25
Middlebury	8	6	2	0	.750	26	13	8	6	2	0	26	13
MIT	8	4	4	0	.500	16	27	8	4	4	0	16	27
New Hampshire	11	3	6	2	.364	20	30	13	3	8	2	22	42
Northeastern	–	–	–	–	–	–	–	7	2	5	0	–	–
Norwich	–	–	–	–	–	–	–	6	0	4	2	–	–
Pennsylvania	10	4	6	0	.400	36	39	11	4	7	0	40	49
Princeton	–	–	–	–	–	–	–	18	9	8	1	–	–
Rensselaer	–	–	–	–	–	–	–	3	1	2	0	–	–
St. John's	–	–	–	–	–	–	–	–	–	–	–	–	–
St. Lawrence	–	–	–	–	–	–	–	4	0	4	0	–	–
St. Stephen's	–	–	–	–	–	–	–	–	–	–	–	–	–
Union	5	2	2	1	.500	8	18	5	2	2	1	8	18
Vermont	–	–	–	–	–	–	–	–	–	–	–	–	–
Villanova	1	0	1	0	.000	3	7	4	0	3	1	13	22
Williams	9	4	4	1	.500	28	32	9	4	4	1	28	32
Yale	14	12	1	1	.893	80	21	19	17	1	1	110	28

== Schedule and results ==
Date	Opponent	Site	Result	Record
Regular Season
January 17	Connecticut Agricultural*	Central Park Rink • Schenectady, New York	W 3–0	1–0–0
January 18	St. John's*	Central Park Rink • Schenectady, New York	W 3–1	2–0–0
February 1	at Norwich*	Northfield, Vermont	T 1–1 ^{OT}	2–0–1
February 15	at Cornell*	Beebe Lake • Ithaca, New York	L 1–7	2–1–1
February 27	at Pennsylvania*	Philadelphia Ice Palace • Philadelphia, Pennsylvania	L 0–9	2–2–1
*Non-conference game.

== Scoring statistics ==
Name	Position	Games	Goals
Arnold Kahn	C	-	4
Morton Henafelt	LW	-	4
Jack Beale	D	-	0
James Forbes	D	-	0
Edward Foster	D	-	0
John Hedinger	D	-	0
Charles Savage	RW	-	0
Doug Stewart		-	0
Charles Townsend	G	-	0
Ira Werle	RW	-	0
Total			8
