= 1929–30 Amherst Lord Jeffs men's ice hockey season =

- Conference: Independent
- Home ice: Pratt Field

Record
- Overall: 2–7–0
- Home: 0–1–0
- Road: 2–6–0

Coaches and captains
- Head coach: Ellsworth Richardson
- Captain: Albert Nichols

The 1929–30 Amherst Lord Jeffs men's ice hockey season was the 17th season of play for the program. The Lord Jeffs were coached by Ellsworth Richardson in his 1st season.

== Season ==
Amherst began its first season under Richardson with a four-game exhibition against the Speculator Hockey Club during the winter break. The team was hoping to build on the experience and produce a good season, however, poor weather reared its head once more and the team found it difficult to get practice time during the season. The lack of ice caused the Lord Jeffs to cancel several scheduled games during the year but they still managed to play nine matches over the course of the season.

The club opened on the road with a trip south to play Pennsylvania at the new Philadelphia Ice Palace. The Jeffmen continued their recent brand of rough and tumble hockey, receiving several penalties in the game, but they swiftly built a lead with goals from Nichols and Turner in the first. Penn fought back in the second but was never quite able to catch the purple squad, who left with a 3–2 victory. The next night the team was in New Jersey to take on Princeton and nearly caught the mighty Tigers off guard. Hanson was under attack from the drop of the puck but kept everything out in the first period, finishing the game with 41 saves. Princeton finally beat the purple netminder at the start of the second but Nichols was quick to reply and tied the game 30 seconds later. At the end of the period, Williams gave Amherst the lead but, replying in kind, the Tigers scored their second goal just 25 seconds afterwards. The game was a slough in the third with neither side providing much in the way of organized hockey. Unfortunately, with just 2 minutes left, Princeton got into the lead for good and managed to hold of a last-gasp attempt by Amherst to banish the Sabrinas.

Back at home for the following weekend, Amherst hosted Williams for the only home game of the season. Nichols and Turner were again the leaders on offense, with the latter getting the opening goal. After the Ephs tied the match, Arthur Williams scored on an individual effort to put his team on top for a second time. The visitors knotted the score in the back half of the second and then put the pressure on Hanson in the third. For the second straight contest the Amherst netminder made more than 40 saves and kept the final frame scoreless to force overtime. Williams turned up the heat in the extra session and were finally able to beat Hanson after a scramble in front of the goal. Around tis time, the team began to suffer the effects of poor weather and saw their home rink rendered unusable for most of the rest of the season. The lack of ice time hamstrung the team and rendered them unable to score in each of their next three matches.

Despite the continued poor weather, Amherst and Massachusetts Agricultural were able to play their annual match on one of the local ponds in early February. That loss with followed by another three days later in Durham, New Hampshire. Despite the defeat, Amherst began to show signs of life against the Wildcats and had many more scoring opportunities than they had in the previous two matches. Those embers burst back into flame in the rematch with Williams that saw Amhest defeat their Little Three rival for the first time in over two years. Arthur Williams, who had scored the last Amherst goal in mid-January, ended the Lord Jeffs' drought late in the first period. Less than a minute later, Nichols flopped a puck towards the Ephs' cage that caught their netminder off guard for a second tally. The home team replied with a furious effort in the second that resulted in one goal but Hanson kept everything else out of the net. Knutson added an insurance marker in the third and enabled the Lord Jeffs to earn their second win of the season.

Any celebrations for the team was short-lived as they headed back to New Hampshire the next day for a tilt with Dartmouth. Though in the midst of a poor season overall, the Indians proved to be far superior to the Sabrinas by clobbering the Jeffmen 1–11. The team tried to recover after being humbles by the ivy-leaguers but ended their season with a loss to Hamilton on the road.

Robert W. Griffith served as team manager with John M. Miller as his assistant.

== Roster ==
No.	Nat.	Player	Class	Pos	Height	Weight	DoB	Hometown	Previous team
	(United States)	Robert S. Bowditch	Senior	C			1909-06-18	Hillsdale, Michigan
	(United States)	Emmons Bryant Jr.	Sophomore	D			1910-01-01	Yonkers, New York
	(United States)	G. Burton Cumming	Sophomore	LW			1909-10-12	Concord, New Hampshire
	(United States)	Donald P. Felt	Senior				1908-10-30	Melrose, Massachusetts
	(United States)	Finley R. Greene	Freshman				1911-11-14	Buffalo, New York
	(United States)	S. Charles Hanson	Senior	G				Easthampton, Massachusetts
	(United States)	Willard M. Kellogg	Senior				1907-11-20	West Hartford, Connecticut
	(United States)	Frederick W. Knutson	Sophomore	D			1910-09-09	Boston, Massachusetts
	(United States)	Albert J. Nichols (C)	Senior	C				West Hartford, Connecticut
	(United States)	Hubert L. Perry	Senior	D			1908-05-20	Buffalo, New York
	(United States)	Norman W. Turner	Sophomore	RW				Waltham, Massachusetts
	(United States)	Arthur S. Williams Jr.	Junior	LW			1907-07-23	Montclair, New Jersey

== Standings ==
1929–30 Eastern Collegiate ice hockey standings
	Intercollegiate							Overall					
	GP	W	L	T	Pct.	GF	GA	GP	W	L	T	GF	GA
Amherst	9	2	7	0	.222	12	30	9	2	7	0	12	30
Army	10	6	2	2	.700	28	18	11	6	3	2	31	23
Bates	11	6	4	1	.591	28	21	11	6	4	1	28	21
Boston University	10	4	5	1	.450	34	31	13	4	8	1	40	48
Bowdoin	9	2	7	0	.222	12	29	9	2	7	0	12	29
Brown	–	–	–	–	–	–	–	12	8	3	1	–	–
Clarkson	6	4	2	0	.667	50	11	10	8	2	0	70	18
Colby	7	4	2	1	.643	19	15	7	4	2	1	19	15
Colgate	6	1	4	1	.250	9	19	6	1	4	1	9	19
Connecticut Agricultural	–	–	–	–	–	–	–	–	–	–	–	–	–
Cornell	6	4	2	0	.667	29	18	6	4	2	0	29	18
Dartmouth	–	–	–	–	–	–	–	13	5	8	0	44	54
Hamilton	–	–	–	–	–	–	–	8	4	4	0	–	–
Harvard	10	7	2	1	.750	44	14	12	7	4	1	48	23
Massachusetts Agricultural	11	7	4	0	.636	25	25	11	7	4	0	25	25
Middlebury	8	6	2	0	.750	26	13	8	6	2	0	26	13
MIT	8	4	4	0	.500	16	27	8	4	4	0	16	27
New Hampshire	11	3	6	2	.364	20	30	13	3	8	2	22	42
Northeastern	–	–	–	–	–	–	–	7	2	5	0	–	–
Norwich	–	–	–	–	–	–	–	6	0	4	2	–	–
Pennsylvania	10	4	6	0	.400	36	39	11	4	7	0	40	49
Princeton	–	–	–	–	–	–	–	18	9	8	1	–	–
Rensselaer	–	–	–	–	–	–	–	3	1	2	0	–	–
St. John's	–	–	–	–	–	–	–	–	–	–	–	–	–
St. Lawrence	–	–	–	–	–	–	–	4	0	4	0	–	–
St. Stephen's	–	–	–	–	–	–	–	–	–	–	–	–	–
Union	5	2	2	1	.500	8	18	5	2	2	1	8	18
Vermont	–	–	–	–	–	–	–	–	–	–	–	–	–
Villanova	1	0	1	0	.000	3	7	4	0	3	1	13	22
Williams	9	4	4	1	.500	28	32	9	4	4	1	28	32
Yale	14	12	1	1	.893	80	21	19	17	1	1	110	28

== Schedule and results ==
Date	Opponent	Site	Result	Record
Regular Season
January 10	at Pennsylvania*	Philadelphia Ice Palace • Philadelphia, Pennsylvania	W 3–2	1–0–0
January 11	at Princeton*	Hobey Baker Memorial Rink • Princeton, New Jersey	L 2–3	1–1–0
January 18	Williams*	Alumni Field Rink • Amherst, Massachusetts	L 2–3 ^{OT}	1–2–0
January ?	at Union*	Central Park Rink • Schenectady, New York	L 0–2 ^{†}	1–3–0
February 5	at Massachusetts Agricultural*	Campus Pond • Amherst, Massachusetts	L 0–2	1–4–0
February 8	at New Hampshire*	UNH Ice Rink • Durham, New Hampshire	L 0–2	1–5–0
February 11	at Williams*	Sage Hall Rink • Williamstown, Massachusetts	W 3–1	2–5–0
February 12	at Dartmouth*	Davis Rink • Hanover, New Hampshire	L 1–11	2–6–0
February ?	at Hamilton*	Russell Sage Rink • Clinton, New York	L 1–4	2–7–0
*Non-conference game.

† Union records do not include a game with Amherst this season.
