= 1929–30 Bates Bobcats men's ice hockey season =

Intercollegiate hockey season

- Conference: Independent
- Home ice: Bartlett Street Rink

Record
- Overall: 6–4–1
- Home: 5–1–0
- Road: 1–3–1

Coaches and captains
- Head coach: Dave Morey
- Captain: Johnny Cogan

The 1929–30 Bates men's ice hockey season was the 11th season of play for the program.

== Season ==
Under new bench boss Dave Morey, the Bobcats entered the season with a strong lineup headed by center and team captain Johnny Cogan. With Secor and McCluskey on the wings, the forward contingent was expected to be a powerful combination for the Garnet while he defense sorted itself out. Anderson, who had played at wing last year, was moved back to defense and joined by new entry Ben White. Sid Farrell was expected to return as the starting goaltender, however, he was unable to play at the start of the year and John Manning took his place in goal. Despite the expectations, the team got off to a slow start when they travelled to Brunswick as the ice there was covered in slush. With both teams playing slow as a result, the Bobcats were unable to get much offense going and fell 1–2 with Cogan potting the goal.

After the lack of scoring, the lineup was changed with Anderson moving back to wing and McCluskey dropping back to the blueline. Kenison was added as a spare defenseman while Garcelon and Johnson joined in as reserve forwards to give the starters a breather when needed. Those moves were on full display when the team headed down to play New Hampshire a few days later and the changes paid off. Three different players scored against the Wildcats and it was just enough to earn the team a win over a strong UNH team. Soft ice was an issue in the next game but this time the team seemed better prepared. Two goals in the first staked Bates to a lead they would not relinquish and the Bobcats pulled even in the state series with a win over Colby.

Poor weather prevented the team from practicing ahead of their road trip south and the Bobcats' condition was a relative unknown as they took on Army. The lack of ice time appeared to take its toll on the Garnet as they dropped both games and got their only goal from Johnson against Massachusetts Agricultural. Though Cogan got several scoring opportunities in both games, he was stymied by the defense on both occasions.

The Garnet returned home and immediately resumed their state series with Colby. The visiting Mules scored early but all that served to do was raise the ire of the Bobcats. Bates fired a sustained barrage of shots on goal but the enemy goalie held. However, in the third, McCluskey finally converted on a Cogan pass to tie the game and sent both teams scrambling for the go-ahead marker. Just as time was ticking down, Cogan managed to elude the checking of Draper and fired the winning goal off of a rush. The return game with the Aggies followed but Bates found itself on the short end once more. The forward line did some damage to MAC, however, Manning didn't play particularly well and cost his team a chance at victory. The last game before the exam break came against New Hampshire in a rematch. The two teams were evenly matched throughout with neither being able to score until the final minutes of regulation. Cogan skated the length of the ice and fired the winning goal to lift the team back up to .500.

Upon the team's return a few weeks later, they were looking for revenge against Bowdoin from the loss earlier in the season. Secor ended up having his best game of the season, scoring twice to lead the team to victory and a stranglehold on the state series. Joe Murphy played in his first game of the season while McCluskey and Johnson play a major part in deciding the outcome. A week later the team's series with Colby came to a close with a 5–5 tie. The Mules started fast and had Bates hemmed in their own end for most of the first period, however, they could only manage one goal. The match broke open in the second with 7 goals being scored. Bates tallied three times before Colby responded and the two eventually finished tied at 4-all. The third ended with the same score and sent both teams into overtime. Secor scored early in the frame but the game was soon knotted again and remained there until time was called.

As the team prepared for their final game against Bowdoin, the result of the Colby series meant that all they needed was a tie to win the state championship. Unfortunately, the weather was not accommodating and water had to be removed from the rink prior to the match. Soft ice slowed the match but Cogan, in his final match, played probably his best game for the Bobcats. The speedy center scored all four of the Garnet goals en route to a 4–1 win and give Bates the state championship in not only hockey but track, baseball and football over the previous year.

Richard Gilbert served as team manager.

== Roster ==
No.	Nat.	Player	Class	Pos	Height	Weight	DoB	Hometown	Previous team
	(United States)	H. Charles Anderson	Senior	D/RW			1909-09-14	Randolph, Maine
	(United States)	Herbert O. Berry	Freshman				1911-01-11	Watertown, Massachusetts
	(United States)	John B. Cogan	Senior	C			1908-08-06	Stoneham, Massachusetts
		Earl H. Garcelon	Senior	D/C
	(United States)	Lloyd A. Heldman	Senior				1909-02-23	Lewiston, Maine
		George H. Johnson Jr.	Senior	LW/RW
	(United States)	Samuel M. Kenison	Junior	D			1909-09-01	Ossipee, New Hampshire
	(United States)	John H. Manning	Senior	G			1909-05-12	Auburn, Maine
	(United States)	Ray E. McCluskey	Sophomore	D/W			1910-10-05	Houlton, Maine
	(United States)	Joseph F. Murphy Jr.	Sophomore	C			1906-09-12	Watertown, Massachusetts
	(United States)	John J. Pendergast	Junior				1906-03-01	Lewiston, Maine
	(United States)	Morris H. Secor	Senior	LW/RW			1908-07-19	Belmont, Massachusetts
	(United States)	Benjamin F. White III	Sophomore	D			1910-01-12	Westwood, Massachusetts

== Standings ==
1929–30 Eastern Collegiate ice hockey standings
	Intercollegiate							Overall					
	GP	W	L	T	Pct.	GF	GA	GP	W	L	T	GF	GA
Amherst	9	2	7	0	.222	12	30	9	2	7	0	12	30
Army	10	6	2	2	.700	28	18	11	6	3	2	31	23
Bates	11	6	4	1	.591	28	21	11	6	4	1	28	21
Boston University	10	4	5	1	.450	34	31	13	4	8	1	40	48
Bowdoin	9	2	7	0	.222	12	29	9	2	7	0	12	29
Brown	–	–	–	–	–	–	–	12	8	3	1	–	–
Clarkson	6	4	2	0	.667	50	11	10	8	2	0	70	18
Colby	7	4	2	1	.643	19	15	7	4	2	1	19	15
Colgate	6	1	4	1	.250	9	19	6	1	4	1	9	19
Connecticut Agricultural	–	–	–	–	–	–	–	–	–	–	–	–	–
Cornell	6	4	2	0	.667	29	18	6	4	2	0	29	18
Dartmouth	–	–	–	–	–	–	–	13	5	8	0	44	54
Hamilton	–	–	–	–	–	–	–	8	4	4	0	–	–
Harvard	10	7	2	1	.750	44	14	12	7	4	1	48	23
Massachusetts Agricultural	11	7	4	0	.636	25	25	11	7	4	0	25	25
Middlebury	8	6	2	0	.750	26	13	8	6	2	0	26	13
MIT	8	4	4	0	.500	16	27	8	4	4	0	16	27
New Hampshire	11	3	6	2	.364	20	30	13	3	8	2	22	42
Northeastern	–	–	–	–	–	–	–	7	2	5	0	–	–
Norwich	–	–	–	–	–	–	–	6	0	4	2	–	–
Pennsylvania	10	4	6	0	.400	36	39	11	4	7	0	40	49
Princeton	–	–	–	–	–	–	–	18	9	8	1	–	–
Rensselaer	–	–	–	–	–	–	–	3	1	2	0	–	–
St. John's	–	–	–	–	–	–	–	–	–	–	–	–	–
St. Lawrence	–	–	–	–	–	–	–	4	0	4	0	–	–
St. Stephen's	–	–	–	–	–	–	–	–	–	–	–	–	–
Union	5	2	2	1	.500	8	18	5	2	2	1	8	18
Vermont	–	–	–	–	–	–	–	–	–	–	–	–	–
Villanova	1	0	1	0	.000	3	7	4	0	3	1	13	22
Williams	9	4	4	1	.500	28	32	9	4	4	1	28	32
Yale	14	12	1	1	.893	80	21	19	17	1	1	110	28

== Schedule and results ==
Date	Opponent	Site	Result	Record
Regular Season
January 6	at Bowdoin*	Delta Rink • Brunswick, Maine	L 1–2	0–1–0
January 10	at New Hampshire*	UNH Ice Rink • Durham, New Hampshire	W 3–2	1–1–0
January 13	Colby*	Bartlett Street Rink • Lewiston, Maine	W 3–1	2–1–0
January 18	at Army*	Stuart Rink • West Point, New York	L 0–2	2–2–0
January 20	at Massachusetts Agricultural*	Alumni Field Rink • Amherst, Massachusetts	L 1–2	2–3–0
January 23	Colby*	Bartlett Street Rink • Lewiston, Maine	W 2–1	3–3–0
January 25	Massachusetts Agricultural*	Bartlett Street Rink • Lewiston, Maine	L 3–4	3–4–0
February 1	New Hampshire*	Bartlett Street Rink • Lewiston, Maine	W 2–0	4–4–0
February 13	Bowdoin*	Bartlett Street Rink • Lewiston, Maine	W 4–1	5–4–0
February 18	at Colby*	South End Arena • Waterville, Maine	T 5–5 ^{2OT}	5–4–1
February 24	Bowdoin*	Bartlett Street Rink • Lewiston, Maine	W 4–1	6–4–1
*Non-conference game.

== Scoring statistics ==
Name	Position	Games	Goals	Assists	Points
Johnny Cogan	C	11	12	1	13
Ray McCluskey	D/LW/RW	-	5	1	6
Ben White	D	-	4	0	4
Zeke Secor	LW/RW	-	3	0	3
Jerry Johnson	LW	-	3	0	3
Sam Kenison	D	-	1	0	1
Chick Anderson	D/RW	-	0	0	0
Herb Berry	Substitute	-	0	0	0
Gus Garcelon	D/C	-	0	0	0
Lloyd Heldman	Substitute	-	0	0	0
John Manning	G	11	0	0	0
Joe Murphy	C	-	0	0	0
Jack Pendergast	Substitute	-	0	0	0
Total			28	2	30

Note: Assists were infrequently recorded during the season.
