= 1929–30 MIT Engineers men's ice hockey season =

- Conference: Independent
- Home ice: Boston Arena

Record
- Overall: 4–4–0
- Road: 2–3–0
- Neutral: 2–1–0

Coaches and captains
- Head coach: Bill Stewart
- Captain: Bill Cullinan

The 1929–30 MIT Engineers men's ice hockey season was the 29th season of play for the program. The Engineers were coached by Bill Stewart in his 5th season.

== Season ==
MIT began the season at the beginning of December when the team held its first meetings. With team captain Bill Cullinan hanging around for an extra season, the team was full of experienced players but coach Stewart saw fit to find new uses for some of his returning charges. Dan Lucey was moved from defense to center with new man Peterson assuming defensive responsibilities. Riley, who had been in goal for the entire '29 season, found himself being challenged by sophomores Coleman and Whiston but the veteran was in net for the opening match. Boston University, who had become an annual foe, was first on the slate. The Terriers had already been on the ice for 6 weeks and were expected to win the match but Riley had a whale of a game and limited BU to just a single goal. Hall's marker in the second proved to be the game winner and MIT won its season opener for the first time in seven years.

The team had over three weeks off before their next match and they spent as much time as they could getting ready for their nemesis, Harvard. Unfortunately, the team was no match for the Crimson and no matter how hard the Engineers tried, they could not match the speed of their cross-town rivals. Peterson, Ford and Hall were notable for their many sallies up the ice but only Ben Hazeltine managed to score for Harvard in an otherwise dismal affair. After a match with Williams was cancelled, the team had just the game with Northeastern before the exam break. Lucey opened the scoring in the first but the Huskies soon had the score tied once more. Riley turned in another stellar performance in the second half of the game, routinely stopping everything that was sent his way. The near-shutout performance allowed Peterson to score the winning goal in the second but it was the play on the penalty kill that was the story of the match. MIT saw a constant march of its players to the box during the match and at one point gave NU a 5-on-3 advantage for nearly 2 minutes. Riley was able to weather the storm and earned MIT its second victory.

The Engineers took their first road trip of the season during the break and met Clarkson up in the north country. The match had been rescheduled from the 10th due to warm weather but the time off did not favor the Engineers. Tech was trounced by the Knights and were shutout for the only time on the season. The team was able to swiftly recover and banish the aftertaste of the embarrassing loss by defeating St. Lawrence and New Hampshire on consecutive nights. The team ended its travels with a match at Princeton. The team looked much better at the Baker Rink than they had the year before and kept the score close. While the defense performed well, Hall's lone goal was the only marker for Tech and not enough to stave off defeat.

The team had a few weeks off to recover from the hectic schedule and played their final game of the season at Brown. Hall scored in the first to match an opening score from the Bears but, once again, that was the only offense the team could muster and MIT ended the year with a loss and allowed another possible winning season to slip through their fingers.

Paul A. Davis served as team manager with.

== Roster ==
No.	Nat.	Player	Class	Pos	Height	Weight	DoB	Hometown	Previous team
	(United States)	Richard M. Cochrane	Sophomore	C			1910-09-27	Melrose, Massachusetts
	(United States)	Philip A. Coleman	Sophomore	G			1908-12-17	Somerville, Massachusetts
	(United States)	William E. Cullinan Jr. (C)	Senior	RW			1907-08-17	Cambridge, Massachusetts
	(United States)	Albert B. Deyarmond	Junior	D			1909-02-26	Nova Scotia
		Joseph P. Fahey	Sophomore	RW
		Horace S. Ford Jr.	Junior	RW			1909-04-06
	(United States)	W. L. Penn-Gaskell Hall	Junior	LW			1908-09-08	Philadelphia, Pennsylvania
		Benjamin P. Hazeltine III	Junior	D
	(United States)	Daniel V. Lucey	Senior	C			1907-07-23	Melrose, Massachusetts
	(United States)	Charles H. Marvin	Sophomore				1909-04-14	Beverly, Massachusetts
		Otto A. Peterson Jr.	Sophomore	D			1911-11-02
		Thomas W. Reagan	Sophomore	LW			1910-09-19
	(United States)	Philip J. Riley	Senior	G			1906-01-08	Lawrence, Massachusetts
		Donald Whiston	Sophomore	G
		James A. Wyszynski	Sophomore	D

== Standings ==
1929–30 Eastern Collegiate ice hockey standings
	Intercollegiate							Overall					
	GP	W	L	T	Pct.	GF	GA	GP	W	L	T	GF	GA
Amherst	9	2	7	0	.222	12	30	9	2	7	0	12	30
Army	10	6	2	2	.700	28	18	11	6	3	2	31	23
Bates	11	6	4	1	.591	28	21	11	6	4	1	28	21
Boston University	10	4	5	1	.450	34	31	13	4	8	1	40	48
Bowdoin	9	2	7	0	.222	12	29	9	2	7	0	12	29
Brown	–	–	–	–	–	–	–	12	8	3	1	46	25
Clarkson	6	4	2	0	.667	50	11	10	8	2	0	70	18
Colby	7	4	2	1	.643	19	15	7	4	2	1	19	15
Colgate	6	1	4	1	.250	9	19	6	1	4	1	9	19
Connecticut Agricultural	–	–	–	–	–	–	–	7	0	6	1	13	25
Cornell	6	4	2	0	.667	29	18	6	4	2	0	29	18
Dartmouth	–	–	–	–	–	–	–	13	5	8	0	44	54
Hamilton	–	–	–	–	–	–	–	8	4	4	0	24	19
Harvard	10	7	2	1	.750	44	14	14	9	4	1	56	29
Massachusetts Agricultural	11	7	4	0	.636	25	25	11	7	4	0	25	25
Middlebury	8	6	2	0	.750	26	13	8	6	2	0	26	13
MIT	8	4	4	0	.500	16	27	8	4	4	0	16	27
New Hampshire	11	3	6	2	.364	20	30	13	3	8	2	22	42
Northeastern	–	–	–	–	–	–	–	7	2	5	0	9	12
Norwich	–	–	–	–	–	–	–	6	0	4	2	4	12
Pennsylvania	10	4	6	0	.400	36	39	11	4	7	0	40	49
Princeton	–	–	–	–	–	–	–	18	9	8	1	47	50
Rensselaer	–	–	–	–	–	–	–	3	1	2	0	6	8
St. John's	–	–	–	–	–	–	–	4	1	3	0	9	14
St. Lawrence	–	–	–	–	–	–	–	4	0	4	0	4	40
St. Stephen's	–	–	–	–	–	–	–	7	5	2	0	21	19
Union	5	2	2	1	.500	8	18	5	2	2	1	8	18
Vermont	–	–	–	–	–	–	–	5	1	3	1	7	20
Villanova	1	0	1	0	.000	3	7	4	0	3	1	13	22
Wesleyan	–	–	–	–	–	–	–	3	0	2	1	6	20
Williams	9	4	4	1	.500	28	32	9	4	4	1	28	32
Yale	14	12	1	1	.893	80	21	19	17	1	1	110	28

== Schedule and results ==
Date	Opponent	Site	Result	Record
Regular Season
December 13	vs. Boston University*	Boston Arena • Boston, Massachusetts	W 3–1	1–0–0
January 6	vs. Harvard*	Boston Arena • Boston, Massachusetts	L 1–8	1–1–0
January 17	vs. Northeastern*	Boston Arena • Boston, Massachusetts	W 2–1	2–1–0
February 3	at Clarkson*	Ives Park • Potsdam, New York	L 0–9	2–2–0
February 4	at St. Lawrence*	Brewer Field Rink • Canton, New York	W 6–1	3–2–0
February 5	at New Hampshire*	UNH Ice Rink • Durham, New Hampshire	W 2–1	4–2–0
February 7	at Princeton*	Hobey Baker Memorial Rink • Princeton, New Jersey	L 1–3	4–3–0
March 1	at Brown*	Rhode Island Auditorium • Providence, Rhode Island	L 1–3	4–4–0
*Non-conference game.
