= 1929–30 Army Cadets men's ice hockey season =

- Conference: Independent
- Home ice: Stuart Rink; Bear Mountain Rink

Record
- Overall: 6–3–2
- Home: 6–2–2
- Road: 0–1–0

Coaches and captains
- Head coach: Ray Marchand
- Captain: Roy Lindquist

The 1929–30 Army Cadets men's ice hockey season was the 27th season of play for the program. The team was coached by Ray Marchand in his 7th season.

== Season ==
Due to the continued inconsistencies with weather, the academy decided to build an artificial rink next to the Lusk Reservoir, the program's former home. However, because the open-air rink would not be ready until the following year, the team had to continue augmenting its use of the Stuart Rink with the nearby venue at Bear Mountain. In spite of the weather not cooperating during the early part of the season, Army was able to start off with a win over Connecticut Agriculture. Waters proved his mettle in goal with a shutout, which the team hoped was an omen of things to come.

A week later, Williams arrived, which was expected to be the first big test for the Cadets. The typically strong Ephs skated circles around Army, however, the defense held up the constant attack. Waters turned in another brilliant performance, stopping several scoring chances by the purple forwards. Team captain Roy Lindquist took advantage of the stellar goaltending and scored on a rush to give Army an early lead. The pressure from Williams continued until the visitors finally broke through early in the second but Waters continued his impressive performance afterwards and stopped everything else in the period. Williams pulled ahead with a marker at the 5-minute mark of the third and, with Army's offense virtually nonexistent, it appeared that the Cadets would lose the match. However, with the team now trailing, Army began to attack the Williams cage and turn the tide of the match. With the Ephs suddenly on the back-foot, the visitors were forced to play defense and stem the tide. With under 3 minutes left in regulation, Tapping scored the tying goal and forced the game into overtime. After an extra 10 minute period, the score remained the same and both teams were forced to accept a draw. The next match saw Lindquist as the hero with the center potting 4 goals against Massachusetts Agricultural. Waters made 30 saves in the win despite the ice being covered by a thick fog for most of the match. A few days later, Army was again victorious thanks to the combined efforts of Lindquist and Waters with a 2–0 shutout of Bates.

Army continued its strong season with a tie against Colgate. Despite looking like the better team for most of the match, the Cadets showed a weakness with the offense being entirely dependent on Lindquist. The home team couldn't capitalize on their chances in the first two periods and could only manage a draw thanks to a pair of goal from their captain. After two overtime periods results in no further scoring, the game was called. The final game in January proved to be the biggest win for the Cadets all season, though the team was taking advantage of a Vermont squad that had yet to play a match due to the weather.

In February, the team played some atypical matches, the first of which came against Marquette. The Cadets rarely played teams from the west but put up a good fight against the Hilltopers, who had recently taken down Harvard, and would go on to claim the western collegiate championship. The following week, Army hit the road for its first away game in almost a year. The match was delayed due to a mixup by B&M Rail that caused the team to arrive without its equipment. When the game did finally start, Goodrich took his turn as the team's offensive star, scoring twice in the first two periods to give his team a 2–1 lead. Unfortunately, the Cadets flagged in the final period, surrendering 3 goals and lost their second consecutive match.

Army returned home for their final three games and ended their slump with a solid victory over St. Stephen's. The next match saw Army take on their Canadian counterparts and produce their best result to date against the Royal Military College. Lindquist tied the match late in the third but the Cadets were outclassed by the much more experienced Redmen. After their third loss of the season, Army ended the year with Rensselaer and Waters turned in his fourth shutout of the season, giving Army its best campaign since the end of World War I.

Paul A. Chalmers served as team manager.

== Roster ==
No.	Nat.	Player	Class	Pos	Height	Weight	DoB	Hometown	Previous team
	(United States)	Roger D. Black Jr.	Sophomore				1908-07-19	Fort Leavenworth, Kansas
	(United States)	James A. Cain Jr.	Sophomore				1908-05-22	Staten Island, New York
	(United States)	Marshall S. Carter	Junior				1909-09-16	Fort Monroe, Virginia
	(United States)	Edward J. Cotter	Junior	D			1908-04-30	Canton, Massachusetts
	(United States)	Thomas C. Darcy	Sophomore				1910-08-12	Boston, Massachusetts
	(United States)	Walter R. Goodrich	Sophomore	LW				Portsmouth, New Hampshire
	(United States)	Harvey P. Huglin	Sophomore				1910-05-09	Fairfield, Iowa
	(United States)	Roy E. Lindquist (C)	Senior	C			1907-02-18	West Newton, Massachusetts
	(United States)	Benedict Ray	Sophomore					Worcester, Massachusetts
	(United States)	Jacquard H. Rothschild	Senior	RW			1907-12-22	Chicago, Illinois
	(United States)	Walter C. Sweeney Jr.	Senior				1909-07-23	Wheeling, West Virginia
	(United States)	Field H. Tapping	Junior	D			1905-12-29	Milwaukee, Wisconsin
	(United States)	Herbert B. Thatcher	Sophomore				1909-05-01	East Orange, New Jersey
	(United States)	Walter M. Tisdale	Sophomore				1909-07-15	Niagara Falls, New York
	(United States)	William P. Turpin III	Junior				1908-08-23	Ogden, Utah
	(United States)	John K. Waters	Junior	G			1906-12-20	Baltimore, Maryland
	(United States)	Kenneth F. Zitzman	Sophomore				1909-06-05	Ridgefield Park, New Jersey

== Standings ==
1929–30 Eastern Collegiate ice hockey standings
	Intercollegiate							Overall					
	GP	W	L	T	Pct.	GF	GA	GP	W	L	T	GF	GA
Amherst	9	2	7	0	.222	12	30	9	2	7	0	12	30
Army	10	6	2	2	.700	28	18	11	6	3	2	31	23
Bates	11	6	4	1	.591	28	21	11	6	4	1	28	21
Boston University	10	4	5	1	.450	34	31	13	4	8	1	40	48
Bowdoin	9	2	7	0	.222	12	29	9	2	7	0	12	29
Brown	–	–	–	–	–	–	–	12	8	3	1	–	–
Clarkson	6	4	2	0	.667	50	11	10	8	2	0	70	18
Colby	7	4	2	1	.643	19	15	7	4	2	1	19	15
Colgate	6	1	4	1	.250	9	19	6	1	4	1	9	19
Connecticut Agricultural	–	–	–	–	–	–	–	–	–	–	–	–	–
Cornell	6	4	2	0	.667	29	18	6	4	2	0	29	18
Dartmouth	–	–	–	–	–	–	–	13	5	8	0	44	54
Hamilton	–	–	–	–	–	–	–	8	4	4	0	–	–
Harvard	10	7	2	1	.750	44	14	12	7	4	1	48	23
Massachusetts Agricultural	11	7	4	0	.636	25	25	11	7	4	0	25	25
Middlebury	8	6	2	0	.750	26	13	8	6	2	0	26	13
MIT	8	4	4	0	.500	16	27	8	4	4	0	16	27
New Hampshire	11	3	6	2	.364	20	30	13	3	8	2	22	42
Northeastern	–	–	–	–	–	–	–	7	2	5	0	–	–
Norwich	–	–	–	–	–	–	–	6	0	4	2	–	–
Pennsylvania	10	4	6	0	.400	36	39	11	4	7	0	40	49
Princeton	–	–	–	–	–	–	–	18	9	8	1	–	–
Rensselaer	–	–	–	–	–	–	–	3	1	2	0	–	–
St. John's	–	–	–	–	–	–	–	–	–	–	–	–	–
St. Lawrence	–	–	–	–	–	–	–	4	0	4	0	–	–
St. Stephen's	–	–	–	–	–	–	–	–	–	–	–	–	–
Union	5	2	2	1	.500	8	18	5	2	2	1	8	18
Vermont	–	–	–	–	–	–	–	–	–	–	–	–	–
Villanova	1	0	1	0	.000	3	7	4	0	3	1	13	22
Williams	9	4	4	1	.500	28	32	9	4	4	1	28	32
Yale	14	12	1	1	.893	80	21	19	17	1	1	110	28

== Schedule and results ==
Date	Opponent	Site	Result	Record
Regular Season
January 4	Connecticut Agriculture*	Bear Mountain Rink • Bear Mountain, New York	W 3–0	1–0–0
January 11	Williams*	Bear Mountain Rink • Bear Mountain, New York	T 2–2 ^{OT}	1–0–1
January 16	Massachusetts Agricultural*	Bear Mountain Rink • Bear Mountain, New York	W 5–3	2–0–1
January 18	Bates*	Stuart Rink • West Point, New York	W 2–0	3–0–1
January 25	Colgate*	Stuart Rink • West Point, New York	T 2–2 ^{2OT}	3–0–2
February 1	Vermont*	Stuart Rink • West Point, New York	W 7–2	4–0–2
February 8	Marquette*	Bear Mountain Rink • Bear Mountain, New York	L 1–5	4–1–2
February 15	New Hampshire*	UNH Ice Rink • Durham, New Hampshire	L 2–4	4–2–2
February 19	St. Stephen's*	Bear Mountain Rink • Bear Mountain, New York	W 3–0	5–2–2
February 22	Royal Military College*	Bear Mountain Rink • Bear Mountain, New York (Rivalry)	L 3–5	5–3–2
March 2	Rensselaer*	Bear Mountain Rink • Bear Mountain, New York	W 1–0	6–3–2
*Non-conference game.
