= 1929–30 Williams Ephs men's ice hockey season =

College ice hockey team season

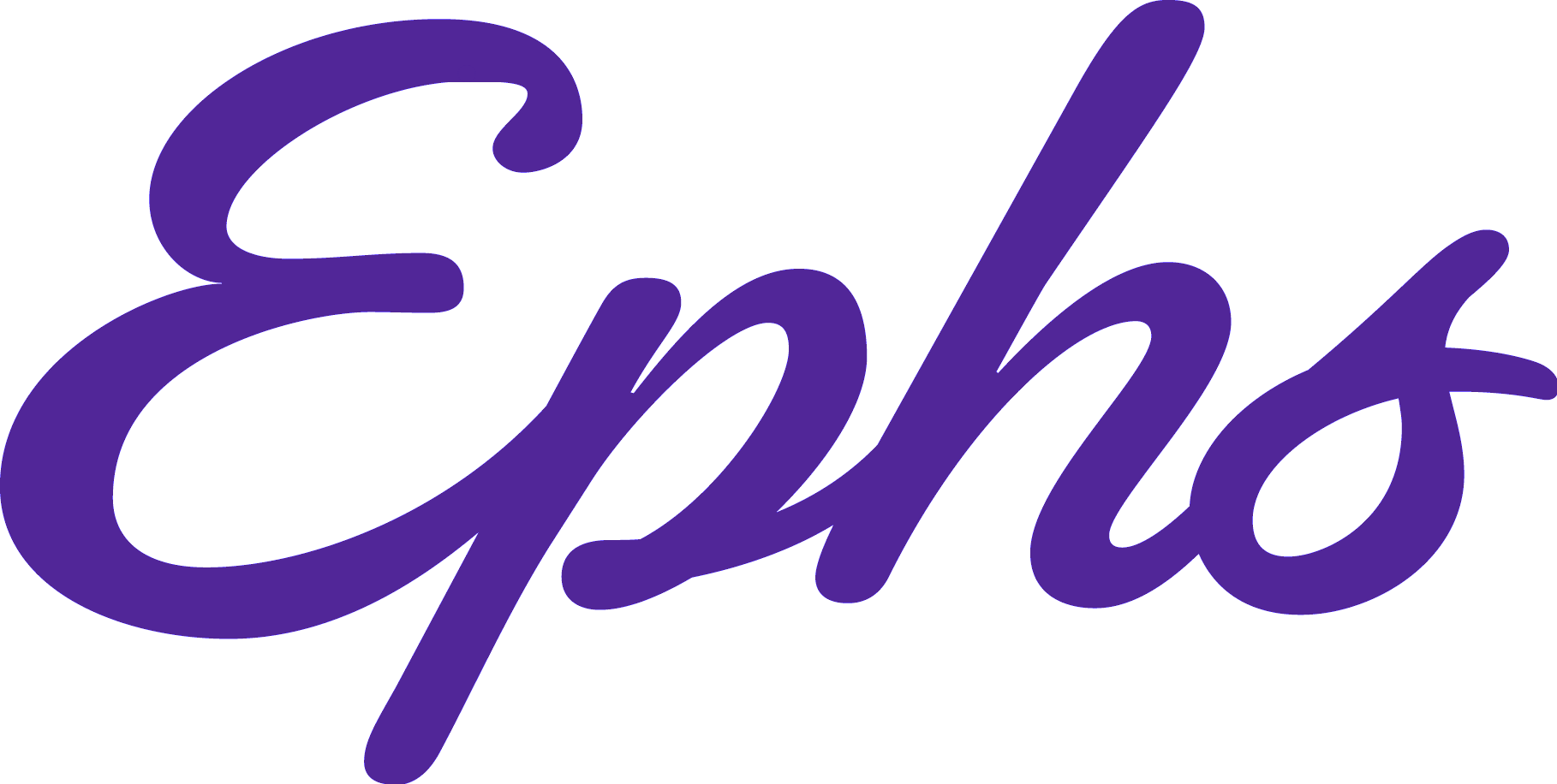
- Conference: Independent
- Home ice: Sage Hall Rink

Record
- Overall: 4–4–1
- Home: 2–1–0
- Road: 1–3–1
- Neutral: 1–0–0

Coaches and captains
- Head coach: Alex Sayles
- Captain: Franklin Hoyt

The 1929–30 Williams Ephs men's ice hockey season was the 27th season of play for the program.

== Season ==
Before the start to the season, the team learned that it would be losing its head coach for the past three years. Leo Bellerose, who was also at the helm of the lacrosse program, was busy putting together a thesis for his master's degree from the Sorbonne and did not have the free time required to coach either team. For a replacement, the school turned to Princeton alum Alex Sayles who had spent the past four years coaching high school hockey at Phillips Academy and Pomfret School. At the same time as they announced the new head coach, the school also was mulling over building an indoor ice rink for the program while planning for two temporary rinks to be available for this year.

Practice began in early December, despite Sayles being unable to attend for the first two weeks, and were conducted under the direction of team captain Franklin Hoyt. While the team had a mix of veterans and new players, the biggest concern for the Ephs was in goal. With the graduation of Watters, the team had no candidates who had played varsity hockey before. Hamilton and Lessing had shared the net for the freshman team so there was some experience but the team would have to hope that at least one of them could assume the responsibilities. Once Sayles arrived he found the team in dire need of ice time as the winter was, once again unaccommodatingly warm. The team had little chance to work together prior to the winter break and made arrangements with Princeton to use the Hobey Baker Memorial Rink for a few days before the team took on the Tigers in an exhibition game. The lack of proper training led to a rather poor showing by the team as they lost 3–7 but the Ephs grew stronger as the game went along.

Williams had about two weeks to get ready for their first official game and looked superior to Army in their opening tilt. However, the Ephs were unable to take advantage of many an opportunity and could only manage a tie in the game. Williams was supposed to return for their home opener against MIT on the 15th, however, the same warm weather that prevented them from practicing caused the match to be cancelled. Instead, the team headed out of town for their first contest with Amherst. The warm weather had rendered the Lord Jeffs' rink a quagmire so the two were forced to play on the Mass Aggies' venue. The game had a similar feeling to the Army match and saw Williams twice overcome deficits to force overtime. The attack from Langmaid, Hoyt and Gross was key in keeping Amherst on the defensive for much of the game and continued in the extra session. The Amherst cage was under siege all night with the Ephs firing 46 shots on goal to just 14 from the Sabrinas. The constant pressure finally resulted in Langmaid's second goal of the match at the 7:30 mark of overtime and the first win for Williams. By then, the weather had cooled off enough for the Ephs to play at home and they played Middlebury mostly even for 40 minutes. The Panthers brought a physical game with them and tried to batter the Ephs into submission but the Purple held served and answered both Middlebury scored in the first period. After a scoreless second, the Blue defenders faltered and 4 goals from Williams put the game out of reach.

As they had the year before, Williams took a road swing south and played Princeton and Penn. Coincidentally, the results were nearly the same as well with a loss to the Tigers following a win over the Quakers. Hazzard, who was the team's most consistent defenseman, was unavailable and his absence was felt as the Ephs surrendered 9 goals in the two games. The team then returned home for its final two home games of the year and played a listless game against Amherst. The Sabrinas were able to avenge their earlier loss against a seemingly uninterested Purple squad. The loss, however, seemed to light a fire under the Ephs and they roared back the following night for a victory over Massachusetts Agricultural. Hazzard's first two goals of the season proved to be the difference for Williams.

Due to the lack of practice for the team, they decided to arrange an exhibition match with Albany High School that they hoped would set them up for success as they closed out the season. While they won the match, the score was very close and, if anything, demonstrated that the team had regressed due to their lack of ice time. After cancelling a match with Union, the team ended the year with a trip east and ended up losing both matches. The first, versus Boston University, turned into a debacle for the Ephs as they allowed a season-worst 8 goals. Both Ward and Lessing played in the game but neither was capable of handling the Terriers' assault. The start of their final game was more promising as they held Brown scoreless for the first 19 minutes but the Brunos provided an unrelenting barrage of shots that sunk the Ephs. Lessing made 42 saves in a heroic effort but the Bears didn't give Williams much in the way of chances an their season ended with a 1–4 loss.

Edward Reeves served as team manager with Sterling Hiles as his assistant.

== Roster ==
| No. | Nat. | Player | Class | Pos | Height | Weight | DoB | Hometown | Previous team |
|---|---|---|---|---|---|---|---|---|---|
| | (United States) | J. Stanford Doughty | Sophomore | LW | | | | Williamstown, Massachusetts |
| | (United States) | Harold B. Gross | Senior | D/F | | | 1908-03-28 | Providence, Rhode Island |
| | (United States) | James E. Hanrahan | Sophomore | C | | | | Buffalo, New York |
| | (United States) | Robert P. Hazzard Jr. | Senior | D | | | 1908-10-07 | Gardiner, Maine |
| | (United States) | Franklin K. Hoyt (C) | Senior | LW | | | 1907-09-11 | West Newton, Massachusetts |
| | (United States) | Benjamin Langmaid | Junior | C | | | | Swampscott, Massachusetts |
| | (United States) | Lawrence A. Lessing Jr. | Sophomore | G | | | | Bayport, New York |
| | (United States) | Herman L. Schwartz Jr. | Junior | D | | | | Ardmore, Pennsylvania |
| | (United States) | Frederick T. Sholes Jr. | Junior | G | | | 1908-03-15 | Geneva, New York |
| | (United States) | William R Stanwood | Junior | RW | | | 1908-02-18 | Wellesley Hills, Massachusetts |
| | (United States) | Grant van Sant Jr. | Sophomore | | | | | New York, New York |
| | (United States) | William D. Ward | Junior | G | | | | Nyack, New York |
| | (United States) | Daniel F. Wheeler Jr. | Senior | RW | | | 1907-05-05 | Bridgeport, Connecticut |

== Standings ==
1929–30 Eastern Collegiate ice hockey standings
| | Intercollegiate | | | | | | | Overall | | | | | |
| | GP | W | L | T | Pct. | GF | GA | GP | W | L | T | GF | GA |
|---|---|---|---|---|---|---|---|---|---|---|---|---|---|
| Amherst | 9 | 2 | 7 | 0 | .222 | 12 | 30 | 9 | 2 | 7 | 0 | 12 | 30 |
| Army | 10 | 6 | 2 | 2 | .700 | 28 | 18 | 11 | 6 | 3 | 2 | 31 | 23 |
| Bates | 11 | 6 | 4 | 1 | .591 | 28 | 21 | 11 | 6 | 4 | 1 | 28 | 21 |
| Boston University | 10 | 4 | 5 | 1 | .450 | 34 | 31 | 13 | 4 | 8 | 1 | 40 | 48 |
| Bowdoin | 9 | 2 | 7 | 0 | .222 | 12 | 29 | 9 | 2 | 7 | 0 | 12 | 29 |
| Brown | – | – | – | – | – | – | – | 12 | 8 | 3 | 1 | – | – |
| Clarkson | 6 | 4 | 2 | 0 | .667 | 50 | 11 | 10 | 8 | 2 | 0 | 70 | 18 |
| Colby | 7 | 4 | 2 | 1 | .643 | 19 | 15 | 7 | 4 | 2 | 1 | 19 | 15 |
| Colgate | 6 | 1 | 4 | 1 | .250 | 9 | 19 | 6 | 1 | 4 | 1 | 9 | 19 |
| Connecticut Agricultural | – | – | – | – | – | – | – | – | – | – | – | – | – |
| Cornell | 6 | 4 | 2 | 0 | .667 | 29 | 18 | 6 | 4 | 2 | 0 | 29 | 18 |
| Dartmouth | – | – | – | – | – | – | – | 13 | 5 | 8 | 0 | 44 | 54 |
| Hamilton | – | – | – | – | – | – | – | 8 | 4 | 4 | 0 | – | – |
| Harvard | 10 | 7 | 2 | 1 | .750 | 44 | 14 | 12 | 7 | 4 | 1 | 48 | 23 |
| Massachusetts Agricultural | 11 | 7 | 4 | 0 | .636 | 25 | 25 | 11 | 7 | 4 | 0 | 25 | 25 |
| Middlebury | 8 | 6 | 2 | 0 | .750 | 26 | 13 | 8 | 6 | 2 | 0 | 26 | 13 |
| MIT | 8 | 4 | 4 | 0 | .500 | 16 | 27 | 8 | 4 | 4 | 0 | 16 | 27 |
| New Hampshire | 11 | 3 | 6 | 2 | .364 | 20 | 30 | 13 | 3 | 8 | 2 | 22 | 42 |
| Northeastern | – | – | – | – | – | – | – | 7 | 2 | 5 | 0 | – | – |
| Norwich | – | – | – | – | – | – | – | 6 | 0 | 4 | 2 | – | – |
| Pennsylvania | 10 | 4 | 6 | 0 | .400 | 36 | 39 | 11 | 4 | 7 | 0 | 40 | 49 |
| Princeton | – | – | – | – | – | – | – | 18 | 9 | 8 | 1 | – | – |
| Rensselaer | – | – | – | – | – | – | – | 3 | 1 | 2 | 0 | – | – |
| St. John's | – | – | – | – | – | – | – | – | – | – | – | – | – |
| St. Lawrence | – | – | – | – | – | – | – | 4 | 0 | 4 | 0 | – | – |
| St. Stephen's | – | – | – | – | – | – | – | – | – | – | – | – | – |
| Union | 5 | 2 | 2 | 1 | .500 | 8 | 18 | 5 | 2 | 2 | 1 | 8 | 18 |
| Vermont | – | – | – | – | – | – | – | – | – | – | – | – | – |
| Villanova | 1 | 0 | 1 | 0 | .000 | 3 | 7 | 4 | 0 | 3 | 1 | 13 | 22 |
| Williams | 9 | 4 | 4 | 1 | .500 | 28 | 32 | 9 | 4 | 4 | 1 | 28 | 32 |
| Yale | 14 | 12 | 1 | 1 | .893 | 80 | 21 | 19 | 17 | 1 | 1 | 110 | 28 |

== Schedule and results ==
| Date | Opponent | Site | Result | Record | |
Exhibition
| December 30 | vs. Princeton* | Madison Square Garden • Manhattan, New York (Exhibition) | Lessing | L 3–7 | |
Regular Season
| January 11 | at Army* | Bear Mountain Rink • Bear Mountain, New York | Lessing | T 2–2 ^{OT} | 0–0–1 |
| January 18 | vs. Amherst* | Alumni Field Rink • Amherst, Massachusetts | Lessing | W 3–2 ^{OT} | 1–0–1 |
| January 22 | Middlebury* | Sage Hall Rink • Williamstown, Massachusetts | Ward | W 6–2 | 2–0–1 |
| February 7 | at Pennsylvania* | Philadelphia Ice Palace • Philadelphia, Pennsylvania | Ward | W 6–4 | 3–0–1 |
| February 8 | at Princeton* | Hobey Baker Memorial Rink • Princeton, New Jersey | Ward | L 2–5 | 3–1–1 |
| February 11 | Amherst* | Sage Hall Rink • Williamstown, Massachusetts | Sholes | L 1–3 | 3–2–1 |
| February 12 | Massachusetts Agricultural* | Sage Hall Rink • Williamstown, Massachusetts | Ward | W 4–2 | 4–2–1 |
| February 14 | Albany High School* | Sage Hall Rink • Williamstown, Massachusetts (Exhibition) | Ward | W 3–2 | |
| February 21 | at Boston University* | Boston Arena • Boston, Massachusetts | Ward | L 3–8 | 4–3–1 |
| February 22 | at Brown* | Rhode Island Auditorium • Providence, Rhode Island | Lessing | L 1–4 | 4–4–1 |
*Non-conference game.

== Scoring statistics ==
| Name | Position | Games | Goals | Assists | Points |
|---|---|---|---|---|---|
| Benjamin Langmaid | C | 9 | 9 | 2 | 11 |
| Jim Hoyt | LW | 9 | 7 | 0 | 7 |
| Harold Gross | D/F | 8 | 2 | 2 | 4 |
| Robert Hazzard | D | 7 | 3 | 0 | 3 |
| Daniel Wheeler | RW | 9 | 3 | 0 | 3 |
| Herman Schwartz | D | 9 | 2 | 1 | 3 |
| Stanford Doughty | LW | 9 | 1 | 1 | 2 |
| James Hanrahan | C | 6 | 1 | 0 | 1 |
| Grant Van Sant | Substitute | 1 | 0 | 0 | 0 |
| Frederick Sholes | G | 1 | 0 | 0 | 0 |
| Larry Lessing | G | 5 | 0 | 0 | 0 |
| William Ward | G | 5 | 0 | 0 | 0 |
| William Stanwood | RW | 9 | 0 | 0 | 0 |
| Total | | | 28 | 6 | 34 |

Note: Only the primary assist was recorded infrequently.
