= 1929–30 Bowdoin Polar Bears men's ice hockey season =

Men's ice hockey

- Conference: Independent
- Home ice: Delta Rink

Record
- Overall: 2–5–0
- Home: 2–1–0
- Road: 0–4–0

Coaches and captains
- Head coach: Ben Houser
- Captain: Stuart Stone

The 1929–30 Bowdoin Polar Bears men's ice hockey season was the 11th season of play for the program.

== Season ==
Before the season began, a question was asked of approximately 200 Bowdoin student if they were in favor of abolishing any of the active athletic programs. While a vast majority (145) wanted to retain all sports, 31 suggested dropping one of the programs. Of these, only one person put forth ice hockey to be abandoned, which was fewer than basketball (2), baseball (8), and fencing (22) among others. The relative popularity of hockey in this regard, along with the recent success, gave a good indication as to the stability of the program and its likelihood of survival. These questions were more pressing than usual in the wake of the stock market crash, particularly as Bowdoin was a small college and did not have the funding to support an infinite number of athletic programs. While the program was likely to stick around, its hopes of getting an indoor rink would have to be put off to a later date despite continued cries for its approval.

Off-ice issues aside, the team entered the year looking to win a third consecutive state title and had several returning players to help the Bears along. While most positions were covered, the biggest question mark was in goal where coach Houser had no one on hand with any varsity experience. By the second week of December the rink was up and ready and the team was only waiting for the ice to form. As was typical, the weather prevented any on-ice practice from occurring until early January so the Bears had to stay in shape with games of 'Houserball'.

The Bears were only able to get in one practice before the first game but still managed to pull off a win. the two most veteran players, Bob Thayer and team captain Stuart Stone, were towers on defense and helped Drew keep the Garnet from scoring but once in the match. Souther, a reserve wing, got the team off and running with the first goal and was soon followed by a second from Ward. The Bears were able to hold onto their lead for the duration of the game and jump to the top of the in-state standings. After a match with New Hampshire was postponed and later scrapped due to poor ice, the Polar Bears continued their Maine campaign with a visit from Colby. The Mules offense looked far more composed that Bowdoin's, who were still suffering from a lack of training time. Thayer made several sprints up the ice but found himself alone most of the time and was unable to score by himself. Colby, meanwhile, was able to effectively pass the puck between its three forwards and overcome the stout Bear defense. Hirtle got his first turn in goal in the third period but he was unable to turn the tide and the Mules took the lead in the state series.

Coach Houser decided to go with Stockman in goal for the next game and the change worked. Northeastern peppered the Bowdoin cage with shots but only one managed to find its way into the goal. The inspiring netminding buoyed the rest of the team and spurred on the rest of the Polar Bears who hardly looked anything like the men who had lost to Colby. Rose made a beautiful pass to Dwyer for the first goal and then, after the game had been tied, fished the puck out of a melee of players and roofed the game-winner to give Bowdoin its first win over a Boston-area team. After the rematch with Bates was postponed, the team headed down to face Boston University. The team ended up having to rely on Dennison in goal, the fourth goalie in as many games. Worse, the team regressed back into the same squad that had lost to Colby and played more like a collection of individuals rather than a team. Stone's lone goal came after the game was already well out of hand.

For the rematch with Colby, it appeared the team had recollected itself and the offense finally got on track. After the Mules opened the scoring, Bilodeau and Ward each scored twice over a 20-minute span to give the Bears a commanding lead. Colby, however, refused to stay down and scored three times in the final 20 minutes to tie the game. In the second 5-minute overtime, the Mules' Delaware skated the length of the ice, danced around Stone and fired the puck into the top of the net. Bowdoin was unable to match the score in the remaining 2 minutes and lost in heartbreaking fashion. The defeat put Bowdoin in a precarious position for the state title and the team could not afford another loss if they wanted to retain the crown.

The exam break put the team on the shelf for the better part of three weeks and, once they returned, Bowdoin found that heavy rains had put a damper on their season. Two more matches had to be cancelled but the Bears managed to trek up to Lewiston for a rematch with Bates since their own rink was unusable. With a distinct lack of practice heading into the match, the team looked out of sorts and were easy prey for the Bobcats. Even Thayer and Stone appeared slow in the match that saw Bates take an insurmountable lead in the state series. Because Bates had defeated Colby twice in the interim, the Bobcats were guaranteed to win the state title.

No ice plagued the team for the remainder of the year and the Polar Bears looked like a shell of their early-season selves in the final two games. Northeastern was easily able to avenge their earlier loss despite the furious play from some of the players while Bates capped off a successful season with a routine victory in the season finale. The poor finish was blamed primarily on the lack of an indoor rink and calls were renewed for the school to properly support the program.

F. B. Neal served as team manager.

== Roster ==
No.	Nat.	Player	Class	Pos	Height	Weight	DoB	Hometown	Previous team
	(United States)	Blanchard W. Bates	Junior	F			1908-06-19	Portland, Maine
	(United States)	Charles C. Bilodeau	Sophomore	C			1910-01-08	Augusta, Maine
	(United States)	Frederick C. Dennison	Junior	G			1908-10-06	Lynn, Massachusetts
	(United States)	Elmer B. Drew	Senior	G			1907-09-20	Boston, Massachusetts
	(United States)	Basil S. Dwyer	Junior	LW			1910-04-08	Hebron, Maine
	(United States)	Ralph B. Hirtle	Senior	G			1907-01-07	Malden, Massachusetts
	(United States)	William H. Lowell Jr.	Freshman	LW			1909-05-12	Winchester, Massachusetts
	(United States)	Malcolm MacLaughlin	Sophomore	W			1911-03-24	Greenland, New Hampshire
	(United States)	James M. Parker	Senior	RW			1908-03-31	Portland, Maine
	(United States)	Herbert H. Rose	Junior	C			1909-09-20	Machias, Maine
	(United States)	Donald D. Sloan	Sophomore	C			1911-11-11	Lynn, Massachusetts
	(United States)	George H. Souther	Junior	LW			1907-08-26	Boston, Massachusetts
	(United States)	Donald A. Stockman	Sophomore	G			1910-01-22	Cambridge, Massachusetts
	(United States)	Stuart R. Stone	Senior	D			1906-08-27	Newton, Massachusetts
	(United States)	Harry B. Thayer Jr.	Senior	D			1907-11-08	Boston, Massachusetts
	(United States)	Wendell Ward	Senior	LW/RW			1907-07-30	Houlton, Maine

== Standings ==
1929–30 Eastern Collegiate ice hockey standings
	Intercollegiate							Overall					
	GP	W	L	T	Pct.	GF	GA	GP	W	L	T	GF	GA
Amherst	9	2	7	0	.222	12	30	9	2	7	0	12	30
Army	10	6	2	2	.700	28	18	11	6	3	2	31	23
Bates	11	6	4	1	.591	28	21	11	6	4	1	28	21
Boston University	10	4	5	1	.450	34	31	13	4	8	1	40	48
Bowdoin	9	2	7	0	.222	12	29	9	2	7	0	12	29
Brown	–	–	–	–	–	–	–	12	8	3	1	–	–
Clarkson	6	4	2	0	.667	50	11	10	8	2	0	70	18
Colby	7	4	2	1	.643	19	15	7	4	2	1	19	15
Colgate	6	1	4	1	.250	9	19	6	1	4	1	9	19
Connecticut Agricultural	–	–	–	–	–	–	–	–	–	–	–	–	–
Cornell	6	4	2	0	.667	29	18	6	4	2	0	29	18
Dartmouth	–	–	–	–	–	–	–	13	5	8	0	44	54
Hamilton	–	–	–	–	–	–	–	8	4	4	0	–	–
Harvard	10	7	2	1	.750	44	14	12	7	4	1	48	23
Massachusetts Agricultural	11	7	4	0	.636	25	25	11	7	4	0	25	25
Middlebury	8	6	2	0	.750	26	13	8	6	2	0	26	13
MIT	8	4	4	0	.500	16	27	8	4	4	0	16	27
New Hampshire	11	3	6	2	.364	20	30	13	3	8	2	22	42
Northeastern	–	–	–	–	–	–	–	7	2	5	0	–	–
Norwich	–	–	–	–	–	–	–	6	0	4	2	–	–
Pennsylvania	10	4	6	0	.400	36	39	11	4	7	0	40	49
Princeton	–	–	–	–	–	–	–	18	9	8	1	–	–
Rensselaer	–	–	–	–	–	–	–	3	1	2	0	–	–
St. John's	–	–	–	–	–	–	–	–	–	–	–	–	–
St. Lawrence	–	–	–	–	–	–	–	4	0	4	0	–	–
St. Stephen's	–	–	–	–	–	–	–	–	–	–	–	–	–
Union	5	2	2	1	.500	8	18	5	2	2	1	8	18
Vermont	–	–	–	–	–	–	–	–	–	–	–	–	–
Villanova	1	0	1	0	.000	3	7	4	0	3	1	13	22
Williams	9	4	4	1	.500	28	32	9	4	4	1	28	32
Yale	14	12	1	1	.893	80	21	19	17	1	1	110	28

== Schedule and results ==
Date	Opponent	Site	Decision	Result	Record
Regular Season
January 6	Bates*	Delta Rink • Brunswick, Maine	Drew	W 2–1	1–0–0
January 11	Colby*	Delta Rink • Brunswick, Maine	Drew	L 0–3	1–1–0
January 13	Northeastern*	Delta Rink • Brunswick, Maine	Stockman	W 2–1	2–1–0
January 17	at Boston University*	Boston Arena • Boston, Massachusetts	Dennison	L 1–5	2–2–0
January 20	at Colby*	South End Rink • Waterville, Maine	Dennison	L 4–5 ^{2OT}	2–3–0
February 11	at Colby*	South End Rink • Waterville, Maine	Dennison	L 1–2	2–4–0
February 13	at Bates*	Bartlett Street Rink • Lewiston, Maine	Dennison	L 1–4	2–5–0
February 21	at Northeastern*	Boston Arena • Boston, Massachusetts	Dennison	L 0–4	2–6–0
February 24	at Bates*	Bartlett Street Rink • Lewiston, Maine	Dennison	L 1–4	2–7–0
*Non-conference game.
