= 1929–30 Villanova Wildcats men's ice hockey season =

- Home ice: Philadelphia Ice Palace

Record
- Overall: 0–3–1
- Neutral: 0–3–1

Coaches and captains
- Head coach: Levine
- Captain: Phil Hillen

The 1929–30 Villanova Wildcats men's ice hockey season was the inaugural season of play for the program.

== Season ==
Despite problems from the Great Depression, Villanova was able to join several other local schools and clubs in the area and found an official ice hockey team in late 1929. Rudy Fried, the owner of the Philadelphia Ice Palace, was of particular help to the program by allowing the team to use the locker rooms and rink. Mr. Meyer, the manager of the Philadelphia Arrows, was also a big help by lending the Arrows' equipment in lieu of their own. One of the Arrows' players, Herb Gardiner agreed to coach the team, however, as he was also engaged by Penn, he was eventually replaced by Levine.

The Wildcats played an exhibition game in early January against the Philadelphia Monarchs. They were able to win the game 3–0 and provide hope that the team's first season could be better than expected. After electing Phil Hillen as team captain by a coin toss, Villanova's first official game was against the Penn Athletic Club on February 16. Eskimo Kennedy recorded two goals while line mate Joe Delaney nabbed the other in the team's surprising 3–3 tie. After the match, Penn A.C. requested a return game to settle the draw and the Wildcats agreed. Before that could take place, however, Villanova faced Penn on the 22nd. Since Penn A. C. had already defeated the Quakers twice that year, the Wildcats believed they had a chance for a victory. Unfortunately, a massive 7-goal second period from the Quakers ended any chance for Villanova that they fell 3–7.

After the humbling loss, the team had a couple weeks for practice before the rematch with Penn A. C. They looked more like they had in their first few games but, due to a hat-trick from former Harvard star William Saltonstall, they dropped their second game of the season. The two teams then agreed to play one final time, with the third match happening in Atlantic City. Coming into the game, the team was set on stopping Saltonstall, which they accomplished. Unfortunately, Roger Buntin was able to take up the mantle and score three goals for the Pennacs. Despite the loss, the team had thrilled the crowd of 3,500 with 5 goals of their own. Kennedy was the team's high-scorer, netting a hat-trick himself to finish the year as the Wildcats' leading scorer.

Julius Becza served as team manager.

== Roster ==
No.	Nat.	Player	Class	Pos	Height	Weight	DoB	Hometown	Previous team
		John Brandy		W
		Joseph Delaney		C
		John Faughnan		W
	(United States)	John F. Flanagan	Senior	D				Brewster, New York
		Phillip F. Hillen Jr. (C)	Senior	D
		Arthur Kennedy		W
		John Masucci		C
		Joseph Matera		W
		Robert O'Farrell		G
		John O'Neill		D
		William Orcutt		D
	(United States)	Joseph E. Welch	Senior	W				Brewster, New York

== Standings ==
1929–30 Eastern Collegiate ice hockey standings
	Intercollegiate							Overall					
	GP	W	L	T	Pct.	GF	GA	GP	W	L	T	GF	GA
Amherst	9	2	7	0	.222	12	30	9	2	7	0	12	30
Army	10	6	2	2	.700	28	18	11	6	3	2	31	23
Bates	11	6	4	1	.591	28	21	11	6	4	1	28	21
Boston University	10	4	5	1	.450	34	31	13	4	8	1	40	48
Bowdoin	9	2	7	0	.222	12	29	9	2	7	0	12	29
Brown	–	–	–	–	–	–	–	12	8	3	1	–	–
Clarkson	6	4	2	0	.667	50	11	10	8	2	0	70	18
Colby	7	4	2	1	.643	19	15	7	4	2	1	19	15
Colgate	6	1	4	1	.250	9	19	6	1	4	1	9	19
Connecticut Agricultural	–	–	–	–	–	–	–	–	–	–	–	–	–
Cornell	6	4	2	0	.667	29	18	6	4	2	0	29	18
Dartmouth	–	–	–	–	–	–	–	13	5	8	0	44	54
Hamilton	–	–	–	–	–	–	–	8	4	4	0	–	–
Harvard	10	7	2	1	.750	44	14	12	7	4	1	48	23
Massachusetts Agricultural	11	7	4	0	.636	25	25	11	7	4	0	25	25
Middlebury	8	6	2	0	.750	26	13	8	6	2	0	26	13
MIT	8	4	4	0	.500	16	27	8	4	4	0	16	27
New Hampshire	11	3	6	2	.364	20	30	13	3	8	2	22	42
Northeastern	–	–	–	–	–	–	–	7	2	5	0	–	–
Norwich	–	–	–	–	–	–	–	6	0	4	2	–	–
Pennsylvania	10	4	6	0	.400	36	39	11	4	7	0	40	49
Princeton	–	–	–	–	–	–	–	18	9	8	1	–	–
Rensselaer	–	–	–	–	–	–	–	3	1	2	0	–	–
St. John's	–	–	–	–	–	–	–	–	–	–	–	–	–
St. Lawrence	–	–	–	–	–	–	–	4	0	4	0	–	–
St. Stephen's	–	–	–	–	–	–	–	–	–	–	–	–	–
Union	5	2	2	1	.500	8	18	5	2	2	1	8	18
Vermont	–	–	–	–	–	–	–	–	–	–	–	–	–
Villanova	1	0	1	0	.000	3	7	4	0	3	1	13	22
Williams	9	4	4	1	.500	28	32	9	4	4	1	28	32
Yale	14	12	1	1	.893	80	21	19	17	1	1	110	28

== Schedule and results ==
Date	Opponent	Site	Result	Record
Regular season
January	vs. Philadelphia Monarchs*	Philadelphia Ice Palace • Philadelphia, Pennsylvania (Exhibition)	W 3–0	
February 16	vs. Penn Athletic Club*	Philadelphia Ice Palace • Philadelphia, Pennsylvania	T 3–3	0–0–1
February 22	vs. Pennsylvania*	Philadelphia Ice Palace • Philadelphia, Pennsylvania	L 3–7	0–1–1
March 8	vs. Penn Athletic Club*	Philadelphia Ice Palace • Philadelphia, Pennsylvania	L 2–4	0–2–1
March 22	vs. Penn Athletic Club*	Boardwalk Hall • Atlantic City, New Jersey	L 5–8	0–3–1
*Non-conference game.

== Scoring statistics ==
Name	Position	Games	Goals	Assists	Points
Eskimo Kennedy	LW	-	7	0	7
John Faughnan	W	-	2	0	2
Joe Delaney	C	-	2	0	2
John O'Neill	D	-	1	1	2
Jack Brandy	RW	-	1	0	1
Joe Masucci	C	-	0	0	0
Joe Matera	W	-	0	0	0
Joe Welch	W	-	0	0	0
Bill Orcutt	D	-	0	0	0
Phil Hillen	D	-	0	0	0
John Flanagan	D	-	0	0	0
Bob O'Farrell	G	-	0	0	0
Total			13	1^{†}	14

† Assists were infrequently recorded and/or reported.
