= 1929–30 Penn Quakers men's ice hockey season =

- Home ice: Philadelphia Ice Palace

Record
- Overall: 4–7–0
- Home: 4–6–0
- Road: 0–1–0

Coaches and captains
- Head coach: Herb Gardiner; William Farson
- Captain: Ed O'Reilly

The 1929–30 Penn Quakers men's ice hockey season was the 14th season of play for the program.

== Season ==
Penn began the season under the leadership of NHL alumnus Herb Gardiner but he turned control of the team over to William Farson after the first game. The initial match against the Penn Athletic Club, a collection of former college players, happened early in the season and did so while the team was missing a pair of starters. The loss of Strain in goal was catastrophic; the team was hammered 10–4 with little coming from the game other than knowing that they needed improved play in net.

While coach Farson tried to address the problem in goal with the addition of Klein to the team, he added Quaker football player Greene to the defense, hoping that he would shore up the early deficiencies. The second game was played against St. John's just before the winter break with Woods shifted to forward in place of LaGhost and, though the team did show a great deal of improvement, they were able to eke out a 6–5 victory in overtime.

After returning from the break, the team went through a series of intensive practices to get them ready for the match against Amherst, which had been added to the schedule just prior to the St. John's game. The defense turned in a much better effort, limiting their opponents to just 3 goals but the team fell to purple team 2–3. Rough play characterized the next game a week later and several penalties led to Penn surrendering their early advantage.

The team had a quick turnaround for their next match and welcomed one of the strongest teams in the country on the 21st. Clarkson proved too much for the Quakers to handle and dispatched Penn 0–12. Penn's losing streak continued through a match with Colgate and the team entered the semester break with little to show for their efforts.

The first game after the break resulted in another loss for the Quakers. Penn began slow, with only Klein's play keeping them in the match. The team surged in the final 20 minutes, however, and tried to overcome Williams lead, ultimately failing to surpass the Ephs. The team then played their lone road game of the season the following week, losing to Brown to extend their streak to six games.

Penn finally won another game when they met Villanova near the end of February. The two teams entered the third period tied at 1-all but the Quakers' offense exploded for 6 goals in the final frame, doing so in front of approximately 1,000 spectators. The team headed into their final pair of games for the season without their captain as O'Reilly was out with an illness. In spite of his absence, the Quakers defeated the visiting Dutchmen and did so in convincing fashion. The team continued the inspired play with a second consecutive shutout, downing RPI 2–0 and ending on a high note.

The moderate success of the team and the support from the student body led most to believe the program would return the following year, however, the realities of the Great Depression eventually took their toll. The expensive program was suspended before the next season began. The team returned in an unofficial capacity at the beginning of the next decade but World War II prevented anything from formally occurring until the mid-60's.

== Roster ==
No.	Nat.	Player	Class	Pos	Height	Weight	DoB	Hometown	Previous team
		Adams		RW
		Greene		D
		Klein		G
		Jim Holland		D
		Holbrook	Sophomore	G
		LaGost		RW
	(United States)	Ed O'Reilly (C)		C				Mount Vernon, New York
		Red Pringle		LW
		Smyth
	(United States)	Herb Woods		D/RW				Brighton, Massachusetts

== Standings ==
1929–30 Eastern Collegiate ice hockey standings
	Intercollegiate							Overall					
	GP	W	L	T	Pct.	GF	GA	GP	W	L	T	GF	GA
Amherst	9	2	7	0	.222	12	30	9	2	7	0	12	30
Army	10	6	2	2	.700	28	18	11	6	3	2	31	23
Bates	11	6	4	1	.591	28	21	11	6	4	1	28	21
Boston University	10	4	5	1	.450	34	31	13	4	8	1	40	48
Bowdoin	9	2	7	0	.222	12	29	9	2	7	0	12	29
Brown	–	–	–	–	–	–	–	12	8	3	1	–	–
Clarkson	6	4	2	0	.667	50	11	10	8	2	0	70	18
Colby	7	4	2	1	.643	19	15	7	4	2	1	19	15
Colgate	6	1	4	1	.250	9	19	6	1	4	1	9	19
Connecticut Agricultural	–	–	–	–	–	–	–	–	–	–	–	–	–
Cornell	6	4	2	0	.667	29	18	6	4	2	0	29	18
Dartmouth	–	–	–	–	–	–	–	13	5	8	0	44	54
Hamilton	–	–	–	–	–	–	–	8	4	4	0	–	–
Harvard	10	7	2	1	.750	44	14	12	7	4	1	48	23
Massachusetts Agricultural	11	7	4	0	.636	25	25	11	7	4	0	25	25
Middlebury	8	6	2	0	.750	26	13	8	6	2	0	26	13
MIT	8	4	4	0	.500	16	27	8	4	4	0	16	27
New Hampshire	11	3	6	2	.364	20	30	13	3	8	2	22	42
Northeastern	–	–	–	–	–	–	–	7	2	5	0	–	–
Norwich	–	–	–	–	–	–	–	6	0	4	2	–	–
Pennsylvania	10	4	6	0	.400	36	39	11	4	7	0	40	49
Princeton	–	–	–	–	–	–	–	18	9	8	1	–	–
Rensselaer	–	–	–	–	–	–	–	3	1	2	0	–	–
St. John's	–	–	–	–	–	–	–	–	–	–	–	–	–
St. Lawrence	–	–	–	–	–	–	–	4	0	4	0	–	–
St. Stephen's	–	–	–	–	–	–	–	–	–	–	–	–	–
Union	5	2	2	1	.500	8	18	5	2	2	1	8	18
Vermont	–	–	–	–	–	–	–	–	–	–	–	–	–
Villanova	1	0	1	0	.000	3	7	4	0	3	1	13	22
Williams	9	4	4	1	.500	28	32	9	4	4	1	28	32
Yale	14	12	1	1	.893	80	21	19	17	1	1	110	28

== Schedule and results ==
Date	Opponent	Site	Result	Record
Regular season
December 12	Penn Athletic Club*	Philadelphia Ice Palace • Philadelphia, Pennsylvania	L 4–10	0–1–0
December 19	St. John's*	Philadelphia Ice Palace • Philadelphia, Pennsylvania	W 6–5 ^{OT}	1–1–0
January 10	Amherst*	Philadelphia Ice Palace • Philadelphia, Pennsylvania	L 2–3	1–2–0
January 17	New Hampshire*	Philadelphia Ice Palace • Philadelphia, Pennsylvania	L 1–3	1–3–0
January 21	Clarkson*	Philadelphia Ice Palace • Philadelphia, Pennsylvania	L 0–12	1–4–0
January 24	Colgate*	Philadelphia Ice Palace • Philadelphia, Pennsylvania	L 2–3	1–5–0
February 7	Williams*	Philadelphia Ice Palace • Philadelphia, Pennsylvania	L 4–6	1–6–0
February 15	at Brown*	Rhode Island Auditorium • Providence, Rhode Island	L 3–4	1–7–0
February 22	Villanova*	Philadelphia Ice Palace • Philadelphia, Pennsylvania	W 7–3	2–7–0
February 27	Union*	Philadelphia Ice Palace • Philadelphia, Pennsylvania	W 9–0	3–7–0
March 7	Rensselaer*	Philadelphia Ice Palace • Philadelphia, Pennsylvania	W 2–0	4–7–0
*Non-conference game.
