= 1929–30 Colgate men's ice hockey season =

- Conference: Independent
- Home ice: Freshman Football Rink

Record
- Overall: 1–4–1
- Home: 0–2–0
- Road: 1–2–1

Coaches and captains
- Head coach: Raymond A. Watkins
- Captain: Frank Howe

The 1929–30 Colgate men's ice hockey season was the 7th season of play for the program. The team was coached by Raymond A. Watkins in his 2nd season.

== Season ==
Eager to build on its first winning season in over a decade, Colgate began the year with renewed hope for the program. Unfortunately, the weather was abysmal for the team's ice rink. The Maroons weren't able to get a single on-ice practice in ahead of the first game and even had to have the foundation of the temporary rink rebuilt just days before the first match. The team wasn't able to play until the end of January when they hit the road and took on Penn. Team captain Frank Howe was sick prior to the trip but was well enough to open the scoring against the Quakers. The two then exchanged goals and ended up tied heading to the end of regulation. Just before the final buzzer sounded, Colgate netted its third goal of the evening to win their opening match in a rather improbable manner. The following evening saw a close copy of the opening match when Anderson opened the scoring against Army. This time there were no late-game heroics and the two finished regulation tied at 2-all. Despite firing a barrage of shots at the Cadet cage through 2 overtime periods, Colgate could not break the tie and had to return home without a second win.

By the end of the following week, the team's rink was in good enough shape for the Maroons to play their first home game. Unfortunately the team had a poor start against Middlebury and found themselves down 0–3 after the first period. The Maroons redoubled their efforts once the second period began and played the Panthers even for the remainder of the game but they could not overcome the early deficit. A week later the team travelled to face Cornell and the Big Red took revenge for the loss a year before. Colgate was walloped 1–7 and showed a distinct lack of teamwork and preparation in the game.

A week afterwards, the team was back on the ice but were without their captain. Playing host to St. Stephen's, the Maroons didn't look particularly invested in the game and put up a lackluster performance. It wasn't until the end of the third, when they found themselves down by a goal, that the players showed any fight. Hofheins caged a shot to send the game into overtime but a snowstorm curtailed their attack afterwards. The reprieve allowed St. Stephen's to score the winning goal in overtime, handing Colgate its third consecutive loss. For their final game the team travelled to face Hamilton and could not escape the weather even in an enclosed building. The ice was rough and slow, forcing the teams to play four 12-minute periods so that the surface could be cleaned more often. Neither team could get any offense going in the match and the only goal came with about 5 minutes to play. Unfortunately, the goal came from a Continental player and Colgate ended a forgettable year with another loss.

Thomas R. Klein served as team manager.

Note: Colgate's athletic teams did not have a moniker until 'Red Raiders' was adopted in 1932.

== Roster ==
No.	Nat.	Player	Class	Pos	Height	Weight	DoB	Hometown	Previous team
	(United States)	Clifton W. Anderson	Senior					Greenwich, Connecticut
	(United States)	Howard B. Crane	Sophomore	D				Mamaroneck, New York
	(United States)	Willard G. Fischer	Sophomore					Buffalo, New York
	(United States)	George A. Hamilton	Junior	G				Flushing, New York
	(United States)	Robert F. Hofheins	Junior	LW				Buffalo, New York
	(United States)	Francis W. Howe	Senior	RW				Buffalo, New York
	(United States)	Eliot B. MacSwan	Sophomore	D				Natick, Massachusetts
	(United States)	James A. Nelson (C)	Junior	C				Sea Cliff, New York
	(United States)	W. Kenneth Squires	Sophomore	G				Pittsburgh, Pennsylvania
	(United States)	Donald M. Terry	Junior					Albany, New York
	(United States)	James B. Visel	Junior				1907-12-07	New Haven, Connecticut
	(United States)	Milford D. Walker	Sophomore	D/C				Short Hills, New Jersey
	(United States)	William B. Wiley	Sophomore					Maplewood, New Jersey

== Standings ==
1929–30 Eastern Collegiate ice hockey standings
	Intercollegiate							Overall					
	GP	W	L	T	Pct.	GF	GA	GP	W	L	T	GF	GA
Amherst	9	2	7	0	.222	12	30	9	2	7	0	12	30
Army	10	6	2	2	.700	28	18	11	6	3	2	31	23
Bates	11	6	4	1	.591	28	21	11	6	4	1	28	21
Boston University	10	4	5	1	.450	34	31	13	4	8	1	40	48
Bowdoin	9	2	7	0	.222	12	29	9	2	7	0	12	29
Brown	–	–	–	–	–	–	–	12	8	3	1	–	–
Clarkson	6	4	2	0	.667	50	11	10	8	2	0	70	18
Colby	7	4	2	1	.643	19	15	7	4	2	1	19	15
Colgate	6	1	4	1	.250	9	19	6	1	4	1	9	19
Connecticut Agricultural	–	–	–	–	–	–	–	–	–	–	–	–	–
Cornell	6	4	2	0	.667	29	18	6	4	2	0	29	18
Dartmouth	–	–	–	–	–	–	–	13	5	8	0	44	54
Hamilton	–	–	–	–	–	–	–	8	4	4	0	–	–
Harvard	10	7	2	1	.750	44	14	12	7	4	1	48	23
Massachusetts Agricultural	11	7	4	0	.636	25	25	11	7	4	0	25	25
Middlebury	8	6	2	0	.750	26	13	8	6	2	0	26	13
MIT	8	4	4	0	.500	16	27	8	4	4	0	16	27
New Hampshire	11	3	6	2	.364	20	30	13	3	8	2	22	42
Northeastern	–	–	–	–	–	–	–	7	2	5	0	–	–
Norwich	–	–	–	–	–	–	–	6	0	4	2	–	–
Pennsylvania	10	4	6	0	.400	36	39	11	4	7	0	40	49
Princeton	–	–	–	–	–	–	–	18	9	8	1	–	–
Rensselaer	–	–	–	–	–	–	–	3	1	2	0	–	–
St. John's	–	–	–	–	–	–	–	–	–	–	–	–	–
St. Lawrence	–	–	–	–	–	–	–	4	0	4	0	–	–
St. Stephen's	–	–	–	–	–	–	–	–	–	–	–	–	–
Union	5	2	2	1	.500	8	18	5	2	2	1	8	18
Vermont	–	–	–	–	–	–	–	–	–	–	–	–	–
Villanova	1	0	1	0	.000	3	7	4	0	3	1	13	22
Williams	9	4	4	1	.500	28	32	9	4	4	1	28	32
Yale	14	12	1	1	.893	80	21	19	17	1	1	110	28

== Schedule and results ==
Date	Opponent	Site	Result	Record
Regular Season
January 24	at Pennsylvania*	Philadelphia Ice Palace • Philadelphia, Pennsylvania	W 3–2	1–0–0
January 25	at Army*	Stuart Rink • West Point, New York	T 2–2 ^{2OT}	1–0–1
January 31	Middlebury*	Freshman Football Rink • Hamilton, New York	L 2–5	1–1–1
February 7	at Cornell*	Beebe Lake • Ithaca, New York	L 1–7	1–2–1
February 14	St. Stephen's*	Freshman Football Rink • Hamilton, New York	L 1–2 ^{OT}	1–3–1
March 1	at Hamilton*	Russell Sage Rink • Clinton, New York	L 0–1	1–4–1
*Non-conference game.
