= 1929–30 New Hampshire Wildcats men's ice hockey season =

- Conference: Independent
- Home ice: UNH Ice Rink

Record
- Overall: 3–8–2
- Home: 2–4–1
- Road: 1–4–1

Coaches and captains
- Head coach: Ernest Christensen
- Captain: Donald McFarland

The 1929–30 New Hampshire Wildcats men's ice hockey season was the 6th season of play for the program. The Wildcats represented the University of New Hampshire and were coached by Ernest Christensen in his 5th season.

== Season ==
With several good seasons under their belt, New Hampshire put together one of its most ambitious schedules for 1930. The team try to play 16 games, the most it had ever attempted. Unfortunately, weather delays played a part early in the season. The team did not gather for its first practice until after Christmas, but, even then, they could only work out for a few days before the temperature spiked and the ice was rendered unusable. The home rink's ice was too soft to practice on and eventually forced the first two games of the season to be cancelled.

The opening game didn't happen until the 11th when Bates Bobcats arrived. The rink was in a good enough state for the game, but the team was not. Hampered by a lack of ice time, the Wildcats were slow out of the gate and quickly found themselves behind. Ed Plourde evened the count before the end of the first period, but the Bobcats continued to pressure Tasker, who was making his first start in goal. The visitors got back into the lead at the end of the second period while UNH, despite using many alternates in the match, looked to tire as the period went on. Bates doubled its lead early in the third period and looked to be heading for a win with how poorly the home side had been playing. In the final minutes, UNH got its second wind and Croke converted on a pass from Plourde for a second marker. Unfortunately, there were only seconds left in the game and New Hampshire was forced to admit defeat.

The team hit the road the following week and travelled down to Philadelphia to face Penn. The few extra days of practice looked to have done wonders for the team. The Wildcats and Quakers spent most of the game skating up and down the rink, while the defenses broke up the scoring chances as a matter of course. Penn relied heavily on a play where the center would pass to the right wing and then skate right in front of the UNH cage. As soon as he got close enough, the center would then receive a return pass and fire the puck at the net. The maneuver worked once, in the first period, but once New Hampshire got wise to the strategy, the defense was able to stop the ploy from working a second time. It took a little longer for the Wildcats to get their offense on track, but Colburn did eventually tie the game in the middle frame. Wendelin and Croke followed up with two goals off of the rush. Two further tallies from the visitors were waved off for offsides and, reportedly, because when the puck was shot into the goal, it sailed through a hole in the netting and was missed by the goal judge. A few days later, the team wrapped up is trip with a game against the junior varsity squad from Yale. Despite playing a collection that failed to make the top squad, UNH found itself overwhelmed by the Elis. Yale demonstrated that even their B-team was a force to be reckoned with by hammering the Wildcats 0–7. While New Hampshire fought hard, their opponents were far more experience and, with consistent ice to practice on, had far better teamwork.

After returning home, the team got ready for a busy week and welcomed Brown on the 22nd. Team captain Donald McFarland opened the scoring on a pass from Plourde but the Bears counterattacked and netted three goals before the end of the first. The home side pressured the visiting cage consistently over the final two periods but they were unable to get a second marker past the Brown goaltender. Two days later, Massachusetts Agricultural arrived and the two teams started off slow. Little happened for the first 10 minutes but, with a flourish, MAC got on the board in the middle of the period. Harry Croke was quick to respond and tie the game which then returned to being a fairly lazy affair for the remainder of regulation. A 10-minute overtime period was used and the Aggies grabbed the lead 4-minutes in. New Hampshire did what it could to stave off defeat but all of their attempts were stopped by the visiting netminder. The next morning the team took a train south for a rematch with Brown. With Tasker out due to illness, Dave Wark got his first start in the UNH crease. Additionally, Al Reinhart, coach of the freshman team and last year's captain, subbed in for coach Christensen who was in the hospital for sinus trouble for the second time that term. The game was even faster than the first with both sides providing plenty of action. Croke opened the scoring while two goals from Wendelin gave the team a 3–1 lead early in the second. The Bears responded with two markers in the third to force overtime. In the 10-minute extra period, the brunos gained a lead at around the midway point. UNH, desperate not to lose another heartbreaker, threw everything they had at the Brown cage. The team attacked the home side physically and were getting very close to losing control when McFarland knotted the score on a shot from the point. The Wildcats relaxed after the outburst and played a more defensive style for the remainder of the period. A second overtime saw more physical play but no further goals and, at its conclusion, the match was declared a draw. The aggressive style employed resulted in a few injuries for New Hampshire; Croke was knocked out but returned to the game after recovering. Wendelin was checked hard into the boards and though he didn't break any bones, as was initially feared, he would be out of the lineup for at least a week.

The next week, the team was back in Durham for the first of two games against Boston University. The visitors opened with fast attack, scoring twice before the close of the first period. Howard Hanley got the Wildcats going in the second with his first career goal but the rest of the team could not follow up on the momentum shift. It wasn't until the final moments of the third that Eddie Plourde tied the game after collecting a loose puck in the BU zone. Due to having to catch a train, no overtime was played. A few days later, the team was in Maine and looking for revenge against Bates. While the defense played a strong game, the offense was unable to beat the Bobcat netminder. Bates collected the only goals of the game in the final few minutes and handed UNH its fifth loss of the year.

With the season spiraling out of control, the Wildcats tried to stop the bleeding when MIT appeared in early February. After exchanging goals in the first, the two sides refused to budge for the remainder of the game and UNH found itself in another overtime game. Unfortunately, the Engineers were able to score at the 3-minute mark and then hold off the inevitable surge from New Hampshire that followed. It wasn't until their game with Amherst that the team returned to its full strength. However, even with all of their principles in the lineup, the Wildcats were unable to score until the middle of the third period. Fortunately, Wark had kept the Jeffmen off the scoresheet so the two makers from Plourde and Croke were enough to secure the win. Two days later, the team was back in Maine for a match with Bowdoin but an early-morning thaw ruined the local rink and forced the game to be cancelled.

The team got some welcome news with appropriately cold weather for the start of the winter carnival. The game was delayed due to some trouble with the trains but UNH was able to host Army to fulfill their part of the festivities. Several hundred people showed up despite the hasty rescheduling and got to witness one of the Wildcats' best performances of the year. The Cadets opened the scoring midway through the first. The two exchanged volleys in the second with McFarland picking up a goal, but the third belonged to New Hampshire. Parkinson tied the game which then shifted from alternating salvos to a fierce melee. Both teams engaged physically with UNH perhaps having a slight edge in the exchange. McFarland gave the home team its first lead with a head-high shot that nearly clipped the Cadet netminder. Army battled hard for another goal but none was forthcoming. McFarland finished off his hat-trick with just 5 second leaf on the clock, providing a fitting end to the victory.

After the win, the team headed to Boston to face a second JV squad, this time in the form of the Harvard Crimson. UNH had very little practice time leading into the match but still managed to give the home side a fight. However, just like they had been against the Yale seconds, New Hampshire was outclassed by the Harvard understudies. Croke and Wendelin scored to keep the two squads tied through 30 minutes but the Crimson distanced themselves in the latter half of the match. Warm weather persisted afterwards and the team was unable to practice at all heading into their final match with BU. Knowing that they had little chance due to their circumstances, coach Christensen brought the entire team to Boston and used the game as more of a glorified practice than an official match. The Terriers took full advantage of their hamstrung opponents and lit up the Wildcats 0–9.

Floyd G. Bryant served as team manager.

== Roster ==
No.	Nat.	Player	Class	Pos	Height	Weight	DoB	Hometown	Previous team
	(United States)	George C. Colburn Jr.	Junior	D			1907-02-09	Newton, Massachusetts
	(United States)	Henry W. Croke	Junior	LW				Claremont, New Hampshire
	(United States)	Howard E. Hanley	Junior	D			1908-05-30	Providence, Rhode Island
	(United States)	Donald J. McFarland (C)	Senior	RW				Concord, New Hampshire
	(United States)	A. Dennis Michaud	Senior	D/LW			1905-09-15	Gorham, New Hampshire
	(United States)	John A. Parkinson	Junior	D			1909-09-16	Penacook, New Hampshire
	(United States)	Howard D. Penley	Sophomore	C			1908-04-18	Laconia, New Hampshire
	(United States)	Edward Plourde	Senior	C				Manchester, New Hampshire
	(United States)	George W. Tasker	Junior	G			1906-07-01	New London, New Hampshire
	(United States)	Lawrence F. Viano	Sophomore	C			1909-08-12	North Hampton, New Hampshire
	(United States)	David L. Wark	Sophomore	G			1910-08-13	Winchester, New Hampshire
	(United States)	Carl G. Wendelin	Senior	D/RW			1905-09-05	Concord, New Hampshire
	(United States)	William W. Wooldridge	Junior	C				Laconia, New Hampshire

== Standings ==
1929–30 Eastern Collegiate ice hockey standings
	Intercollegiate							Overall					
	GP	W	L	T	Pct.	GF	GA	GP	W	L	T	GF	GA
Amherst	9	2	7	0	.222	12	30	9	2	7	0	12	30
Army	10	6	2	2	.700	28	18	11	6	3	2	31	23
Bates	11	6	4	1	.591	28	21	11	6	4	1	28	21
Boston University	10	4	5	1	.450	34	31	13	4	8	1	40	48
Bowdoin	9	2	7	0	.222	12	29	9	2	7	0	12	29
Brown	–	–	–	–	–	–	–	12	8	3	1	–	–
Clarkson	6	4	2	0	.667	50	11	10	8	2	0	70	18
Colby	7	4	2	1	.643	19	15	7	4	2	1	19	15
Colgate	6	1	4	1	.250	9	19	6	1	4	1	9	19
Connecticut Agricultural	–	–	–	–	–	–	–	–	–	–	–	–	–
Cornell	6	4	2	0	.667	29	18	6	4	2	0	29	18
Dartmouth	–	–	–	–	–	–	–	13	5	8	0	44	54
Hamilton	–	–	–	–	–	–	–	8	4	4	0	–	–
Harvard	10	7	2	1	.750	44	14	12	7	4	1	48	23
Massachusetts Agricultural	11	7	4	0	.636	25	25	11	7	4	0	25	25
Middlebury	8	6	2	0	.750	26	13	8	6	2	0	26	13
MIT	8	4	4	0	.500	16	27	8	4	4	0	16	27
New Hampshire	11	3	6	2	.364	20	30	13	3	8	2	22	42
Northeastern	–	–	–	–	–	–	–	7	2	5	0	–	–
Norwich	–	–	–	–	–	–	–	6	0	4	2	–	–
Pennsylvania	10	4	6	0	.400	36	39	11	4	7	0	40	49
Princeton	–	–	–	–	–	–	–	18	9	8	1	–	–
Rensselaer	–	–	–	–	–	–	–	3	1	2	0	–	–
St. John's	–	–	–	–	–	–	–	–	–	–	–	–	–
St. Lawrence	–	–	–	–	–	–	–	4	0	4	0	–	–
St. Stephen's	–	–	–	–	–	–	–	–	–	–	–	–	–
Union	5	2	2	1	.500	8	18	5	2	2	1	8	18
Vermont	–	–	–	–	–	–	–	–	–	–	–	–	–
Villanova	1	0	1	0	.000	3	7	4	0	3	1	13	22
Williams	9	4	4	1	.500	28	32	9	4	4	1	28	32
Yale	14	12	1	1	.893	80	21	19	17	1	1	110	28

== Schedule and results ==
Date	Opponent	Site	Result	Record
Regular Season
January 10	Bates*	UNH Ice Rink • Durham, New Hampshire	L 2–3	0–1–0
January 16	at Pennsylvania*	Philadelphia Ice Palace • Philadelphia, Pennsylvania	W 3–1	1–1–0
January 18	at Yale JV*	New Haven Arena • New Haven, Connecticut	L 0–7	1–2–0
January 22	Brown*	UNH Ice Rink • Durham, New Hampshire	L 1–3	1–3–0
January 24	Massachusetts Agricultural*	UNH Ice Rink • Durham, New Hampshire	L 1–2 ^{OT}	1–4–0
January 25	at Brown*	Rhode Island Auditorium • Providence, Rhode Island	T 4–4 ^{2OT}	1–4–1
January 29	Boston University*	UNH Ice Rink • Durham, New Hampshire	T 2–2	1–4–2
February 1	at Bates*	Bartlett Street Rink • Lewiston, Maine	L 0–2	1–5–2
February 5	MIT*	UNH Ice Rink • Durham, New Hampshire	L 1–2 ^{OT}	1–6–2
February 8	Amherst*	UNH Ice Rink • Durham, New Hampshire	W 2–0	2–6–2
February 15	Army*	UNH Ice Rink • Durham, New Hampshire	W 4–2	3–6–2
February 19	at Harvard JV*	Boston Garden • Boston, Massachusetts	L 2–5	3–7–2
February 26	at Boston University*	Boston Arena • Boston, Massachusetts	L 0–9	3–8–2
*Non-conference game.
