= 1929–30 Middlebury Panthers men's ice hockey season =

- Conference: Independent
- Home ice: Middlebury Rink

Record
- Overall: 6–2–0
- Home: 2–0–0
- Road: 4–2–0

Coaches and captains
- Head coach: Richard Phelan
- Captain: George Foote

The 1929–30 Middlebury Panthers men's ice hockey season was the 8th season of play for the program. The Panthers coached by Richard Phelan in his 1st season.

== Season ==
With Roy Clogston departing from his post after one season, the college turned to assistant football coach, Richard Phelan, to take over the ice hockey program. Phelan had some good fortune in his first season as the weather was cold enough for the home rink to form in December, allowing the team to get some practice time in before the first game. With the Panthers ready for their match with Norwich, the team easily took down their in-state rivals. It was only through a tremendous effort by the opposing netminder that the score was only 2–0.

After returning from the holiday break, Middlebury had three games in quick succession, however, two were scrapped due to a lack of ice. Only their game at Princeton took place, but it did give the team a change to show that was at the same level as other major programs. The Tigers got out to a 2–0 lead but Makela single-handedly tied the game, netting his second late in the third. Webster played brilliantly in goal, turning aside several chances from the home team to give the Panthers a chance. Unfortunately, shortly after Makela's second marker, Princeton tallied for a third time and held off Middlebury for the final five minutes to take the match. A week later, the Panthers lost to Williams when they kicked off their second road trip. Aside from it being the first time Middlebury had lost consecutive games since 1924, the defense, which had usually been the team's strength failed in the third period. Makela and Crocker gave the Panthers two 1-goal leads in the first but neither lasted for very long. After a scoreless second, the home team completely dominated play in the third. Foote and Nelson were unable to hold back the Ephs' attack and four goals got past Webster to conclusively hand the game to the purple squad.

After the second loss, Middlebury headed west and was forced to cancel a match with Union, again due to problems with ice. Instead, the Panthers continued on to Hamilton and faced off with Colgate at the end of the month. By then, Duke Nelson had been moved up to center with Huntington replacing him on defense. Melbye was then moved to wing while Crocker was used as a reserve instead of a starter. The new lineup worked; Middlebury came storming out of the gate and had a 3–0 lead after the first period. Makela added two more goals in the third to ensure the win and propel the team forward with renewed confidence. At the beginning of February, The Panthers met Hamilton for what was expected to be a very close match and the two did not disappoint. The Panthers ended their road trip with a 2–1 victory and returned home to seek their fifth consecutive state championship.

In a rematch with Norwich, the two battled to almost an identical result with the defense giving almost no scoring chances to the opposition. Middlebury was set to wrap up the in-state season with a home-and-home series against Vermont. The first game saw Red Melbye as the overwhelming hero, setting a new program record with 4 goals on the evening. Two days later, the Panthers invaded Burlington and came out with an even bigger victory. In the middle of a winter storm, Nelson, Melbye and Makela each scored twice to blow the Catamounts off of the ice and claim the program's fourth consecutive state championship. The final game on the schedule, slated for February 22 with St. Lawrence, was cancelled due to insufficient ice.

Edward R. Allen served as team manager with Maynard C. Robinson as his assistant.

== Roster ==
No.	Nat.	Player	Class	Pos	Height	Weight	DoB	Hometown	Previous team
	(United States)	Robert A. Bakeman Jr.	Sophomore				1910-05-30	Peabody, Massachusetts
	(United States)	Howard W. Chappell	Junior					Clinton, New York
	(United States)	Walton T. Crocker	Junior	D/LW			1909-05-06	Reading, Massachusetts
	(United States)	Lester W. Eaton	Sophomore				1910-07-27	Bradford, Vermont
	(United States)	George E. Foote (C)	Junior	D				Boston, Massachusetts
	(United States)	Theodore T. Huntington	Senior	D				New Rochelle, New York
	(United States)	Urho A. Makela	Sophomore	RW			1909-12-02	Peabody, Massachusetts
	(United States)	Robert P. McLeod	Senior	LW			1908-03-28	Natick, Massachusetts
	(United States)	Arnold T. Melbye	Sophomore	C/LW				Wellesley Hills, Massachusetts
	(United States)	Walter J. Nelson	Sophomore	C/D			1907-04-26	Boston, Massachusetts
	(United States)	Howard C. Viehman	Sophomore				1909-10-24	Brooklyn, New York
	(United States)	Carl B. Webster	Junior	G			1909-07-11	Petersburg, New York
	(United States)	George E. Yeomans	Freshman				1911-09-16	Canton, Massachusetts

== Standings ==
1929–30 Eastern Collegiate ice hockey standings
	Intercollegiate							Overall					
	GP	W	L	T	Pct.	GF	GA	GP	W	L	T	GF	GA
Amherst	9	2	7	0	.222	12	30	9	2	7	0	12	30
Army	10	6	2	2	.700	28	18	11	6	3	2	31	23
Bates	11	6	4	1	.591	28	21	11	6	4	1	28	21
Boston University	10	4	5	1	.450	34	31	13	4	8	1	40	48
Bowdoin	9	2	7	0	.222	12	29	9	2	7	0	12	29
Brown	–	–	–	–	–	–	–	12	8	3	1	–	–
Clarkson	6	4	2	0	.667	50	11	10	8	2	0	70	18
Colby	7	4	2	1	.643	19	15	7	4	2	1	19	15
Colgate	6	1	4	1	.250	9	19	6	1	4	1	9	19
Connecticut Agricultural	–	–	–	–	–	–	–	–	–	–	–	–	–
Cornell	6	4	2	0	.667	29	18	6	4	2	0	29	18
Dartmouth	–	–	–	–	–	–	–	13	5	8	0	44	54
Hamilton	–	–	–	–	–	–	–	8	4	4	0	–	–
Harvard	10	7	2	1	.750	44	14	12	7	4	1	48	23
Massachusetts Agricultural	11	7	4	0	.636	25	25	11	7	4	0	25	25
Middlebury	8	6	2	0	.750	26	13	8	6	2	0	26	13
MIT	8	4	4	0	.500	16	27	8	4	4	0	16	27
New Hampshire	11	3	6	2	.364	20	30	13	3	8	2	22	42
Northeastern	–	–	–	–	–	–	–	7	2	5	0	–	–
Norwich	–	–	–	–	–	–	–	6	0	4	2	–	–
Pennsylvania	10	4	6	0	.400	36	39	11	4	7	0	40	49
Princeton	–	–	–	–	–	–	–	18	9	8	1	–	–
Rensselaer	–	–	–	–	–	–	–	3	1	2	0	–	–
St. John's	–	–	–	–	–	–	–	–	–	–	–	–	–
St. Lawrence	–	–	–	–	–	–	–	4	0	4	0	–	–
St. Stephen's	–	–	–	–	–	–	–	–	–	–	–	–	–
Union	5	2	2	1	.500	8	18	5	2	2	1	8	18
Vermont	–	–	–	–	–	–	–	–	–	–	–	–	–
Villanova	1	0	1	0	.000	3	7	4	0	3	1	13	22
Williams	9	4	4	1	.500	28	32	9	4	4	1	28	32
Yale	14	12	1	1	.893	80	21	19	17	1	1	110	28

== Schedule and results ==
Date	Opponent	Site	Result	Record
Regular Season
January 11	Norwich*	McCullough Rink • Middlebury, Vermont	W 2–0	1–0–0
January 15	at Princeton*	Hobey Baker Memorial Rink • Princeton, New Jersey	L 2–3	1–1–0
January 22	at Williams*	Sage Hall Rink • Williamstown, Massachusetts	L 2–6	1–2–0
January 31	at Colgate*	Freshman Football Rink • Hamilton, New York	W 5–2	2–2–0
February 1	at Hamilton*	Russell Sage Rink • Clinton, New York	W 2–1	3–2–0
February 11	at Norwich*	Sabine Field Rink • Northfield, Vermont	W 3–0	4–2–0
February 15	Vermont*	McCullough Rink • Middlebury, Vermont	W 4–1	5–2–0
February 17	at Vermont*	UVM Ice Rink • Burlington, Vermont	W 6–0	6–2–0
*Non-conference game.
