= 1929–30 Cornell Big Red men's ice hockey season =

Intercollegiate hockey season

- Home ice: Beebe Lake

Record
- Overall: 4–2–0
- Home: 3–1–0
- Road: 1–1–0

Coaches and captains
- Head coach: Nick Bawlf
- Captain: Harold Clark

The 1929–30 Cornell Big Red men's ice hockey season was the 25th season of play for the program. The teams was coached by Nick Bawlf in his 10th season.

== Season ==
Cornell began the season like it had many before; struggling to get usable ice during a warm winter. Sure enough, the ice wasn't good enough for the team's first scheduled game and the match with Union was postponed. The following week the team headed to Clinton to face Hamilton and, in a surprising result, routed the Continentals 6–0. It was the most goals Cornell had scored in a game in six years and gave hope for a program that was typically bereft of offensive firepower.

Most of that hope evaporated during the next game when Clarkson throttled Cornell 0–8. The team was able to get several practices in afterwards, during the examination break, and they were much better prepared for their next opponent. Cornell made swift work of Colgate, again showing their scoring potential with a 7–1 victory. The game saw the debut of Shields in net for Cornell and coach Bawlf was hoping he had found a new star. Shields took a puck over his eye during practice and sported a sizable gash in the next game against St. Lawrence. Cornell lambasted the Saints, scoring seemingly at will against a team that had given them fits over the previous two years. The win ensured that Cornell would have at least a .500 record for the year and saw every reserve member see some playing time.

The team's next game came just three days later and the lack of rest didn't blunt the team's scoring. Cornell won its 4th game of the year with a 7–1 score, giving the Big Red their first winning season in eight years. The squad had another short break before heading down to New Jersey for their final game of the year. Despite all that they had accomplished, Princeton easily handled the Big Red, serving notice that Cornell still had a ways to go before they could compete with the college hockey elite.

== Roster ==
| No. | Nat. | Player | Class | Pos | Height | Weight | DoB | Hometown | Previous team |
|---|---|---|---|---|---|---|---|---|---|
| | (United States) | Harold T. Clark (C) | Junior | D | | | | Utica, New York |
| | (United States) | Carleton Endemann | Junior | | | | | New York, New York |
| | (United States) | Edward Guthrie | Junior | RW | | | | Ithaca, New York |
| | (United States) | Charles Hapgood | Junior | | | | | Manhattan, New York |
| | (United States) | Ernest Kingsbury | Senior | D | | | | Ithaca, New York |
| | (United States) | Richard Llop | Senior | | | | | Manhattan, New York |
| | (United States) | James McKowne | Sophomore | C | | | | Buffalo, New York |
| | (United States) | John Parker | Senior | D | | | | Schenectady, New York |
| | (United States) | Gordon Priedeman | | | | | | Minneapolis, Minnesota |
| | (United States) | William Redding | | | | | | Worcester, Massachusetts |
| | (United States) | Benjamin Rhodes | Junior | G | | | | Niagara Falls, New York |
| | (Canada) | Jack Shields | Sophomore | G | | | | East Gwillimbury, Ontario |
| | (United States) | Robert Spitzmiller | Junior | LW | | | | Buffalo, New York |
| | (United States) | Donald Uffinger | Senior | | | | | Summit, New Jersey |
| | (United States) | John Walsh | Senior | | | | | Dorchester, Massachusetts |

== Standings ==
1929–30 Eastern Collegiate ice hockey standings
| | Intercollegiate | | | | | | | Overall | | | | | |
| | GP | W | L | T | Pct. | GF | GA | GP | W | L | T | GF | GA |
|---|---|---|---|---|---|---|---|---|---|---|---|---|---|
| Amherst | 9 | 2 | 7 | 0 | .222 | 12 | 30 | 9 | 2 | 7 | 0 | 12 | 30 |
| Army | 10 | 6 | 2 | 2 | .700 | 28 | 18 | 11 | 6 | 3 | 2 | 31 | 23 |
| Bates | 11 | 6 | 4 | 1 | .591 | 28 | 21 | 11 | 6 | 4 | 1 | 28 | 21 |
| Boston University | 10 | 4 | 5 | 1 | .450 | 34 | 31 | 13 | 4 | 8 | 1 | 40 | 48 |
| Bowdoin | 9 | 2 | 7 | 0 | .222 | 12 | 29 | 9 | 2 | 7 | 0 | 12 | 29 |
| Brown | – | – | – | – | – | – | – | 12 | 8 | 3 | 1 | – | – |
| Clarkson | 6 | 4 | 2 | 0 | .667 | 50 | 11 | 10 | 8 | 2 | 0 | 70 | 18 |
| Colby | 7 | 4 | 2 | 1 | .643 | 19 | 15 | 7 | 4 | 2 | 1 | 19 | 15 |
| Colgate | 6 | 1 | 4 | 1 | .250 | 9 | 19 | 6 | 1 | 4 | 1 | 9 | 19 |
| Connecticut Agricultural | – | – | – | – | – | – | – | – | – | – | – | – | – |
| Cornell | 6 | 4 | 2 | 0 | .667 | 29 | 18 | 6 | 4 | 2 | 0 | 29 | 18 |
| Dartmouth | – | – | – | – | – | – | – | 13 | 5 | 8 | 0 | 44 | 54 |
| Hamilton | – | – | – | – | – | – | – | 8 | 4 | 4 | 0 | – | – |
| Harvard | 10 | 7 | 2 | 1 | .750 | 44 | 14 | 12 | 7 | 4 | 1 | 48 | 23 |
| Massachusetts Agricultural | 11 | 7 | 4 | 0 | .636 | 25 | 25 | 11 | 7 | 4 | 0 | 25 | 25 |
| Middlebury | 8 | 6 | 2 | 0 | .750 | 26 | 13 | 8 | 6 | 2 | 0 | 26 | 13 |
| MIT | 8 | 4 | 4 | 0 | .500 | 16 | 27 | 8 | 4 | 4 | 0 | 16 | 27 |
| New Hampshire | 11 | 3 | 6 | 2 | .364 | 20 | 30 | 13 | 3 | 8 | 2 | 22 | 42 |
| Northeastern | – | – | – | – | – | – | – | 7 | 2 | 5 | 0 | – | – |
| Norwich | – | – | – | – | – | – | – | 6 | 0 | 4 | 2 | – | – |
| Pennsylvania | 10 | 4 | 6 | 0 | .400 | 36 | 39 | 11 | 4 | 7 | 0 | 40 | 49 |
| Princeton | – | – | – | – | – | – | – | 18 | 9 | 8 | 1 | – | – |
| Rensselaer | – | – | – | – | – | – | – | 3 | 1 | 2 | 0 | – | – |
| St. John's | – | – | – | – | – | – | – | – | – | – | – | – | – |
| St. Lawrence | – | – | – | – | – | – | – | 4 | 0 | 4 | 0 | – | – |
| St. Stephen's | – | – | – | – | – | – | – | – | – | – | – | – | – |
| Union | 5 | 2 | 2 | 1 | .500 | 8 | 18 | 5 | 2 | 2 | 1 | 8 | 18 |
| Vermont | – | – | – | – | – | – | – | – | – | – | – | – | – |
| Villanova | 1 | 0 | 1 | 0 | .000 | 3 | 7 | 4 | 0 | 3 | 1 | 13 | 22 |
| Williams | 9 | 4 | 4 | 1 | .500 | 28 | 32 | 9 | 4 | 4 | 1 | 28 | 32 |
| Yale | 14 | 12 | 1 | 1 | .893 | 80 | 21 | 19 | 17 | 1 | 1 | 110 | 28 |

== Schedule and results ==
| Date | Opponent | Site | Result | Record |
Regular season
| January 18 | at Hamilton* | Russell Sage Rink • Clinton, New York | W 6–0 | 1–0–0 |
| January 26 | Clarkson* | Beebe Lake • Ithaca, New York | L 0–8 | 1–1–0 |
| February 7 | Colgate* | Beebe Lake • Ithaca, New York | W 7–1 | 2–1–0 |
| February 12 ^{†} | St. Lawrence* | Beebe Lake • Ithaca, New York | W 9–2 | 3–1–0 |
| February 15 | Union* | Beebe Lake • Ithaca, New York | W 7–1 | 4–1–0 |
| February 19 | at Princeton* | Hobey Baker Memorial Rink • Princeton, New Jersey | L 0–6 | 4–2–0 |
*Non-conference game.

† Cornell records have the St. Lawrence game being played on January 25 and the score as 4–2 in their favor.
