= 1929–30 Harvard Crimson men's ice hockey season =

College ice hockey season

East Intercollegiate, co-Champion
- Conference: Independent
- Home ice: Boston Garden

Record
- Overall: 7–4–1
- Home: 4–3–1
- Road: 3–0–0
- Neutral: 0–1–0

Coaches and captains
- Head coach: Joseph Stubbs
- Captain: Eliot Putnam

The 1929–30 Harvard Crimson men's ice hockey season was the 32nd season of play for the program.

== Season ==
Prior to the season, in order to settle the confusion caused by using professional referees in amateur games, a meeting was held at the Harvard Club so that colleges could agree on a uniform code of rules to be observed by all. The meeting specifically did not address the new offside rule that the NHL was implementing, though that probably was for the best as the NHL would have to alter its rule during the 1929–30 season to counteract the ballooning goal totals. In addition, Harvard began recording assists as an official statistic for this season.

For the first time in 6 years Harvard did not open its season against MIT, instead they returned to their former home to play Boston University. Despite the change in opponent, Harvard still won its inaugural game though both teams weren't particularly sharp in the contest. In their annual contests against Canadian colleges, Harvard fell to Toronto twice but then rebounded after shuffling their lineup against usual opponent MIT.

On January 8 Harvard played only the second game in the program's history against a western opponent when they faced Michigan Tech. The game was a debacle for the visitors as Harvard won 11–0 and looked well on their way to giving Yale a run for the intercollegiate championship. After another win over Boston University, Harvard welcomed Marquette to the Boston Garden on February 5 but the three-week layoff since their previous game appeared to have the Crimson champing at the bit. Harvard took 10 penalties during the game, giving Marquette two separate 5-on-3 advantages. The Crimson defense responded well, holding back the Hilltoppers through most of the game, but Marquette slowly built a 2–1 lead and carried into the third period. With only 5 minutes remaining both teams began a furious effort to score and four goals were made at the end of the game, however, Harvard couldn't catch Marquette and lost 3–4.

Harvard had their two series against Dartmouth and Yale remaining and redoubled their defensive efforts for the contests. In the two games against the Indians Harvard surrendered just one goal and then had a two-week wait for the showdown with their arch rival. The Elis entered the series undefeated for the second year in a row and Harvard would have the honor of trying to spoil their season once more. In the first game the two traded one-goals leads but by the end of 60 minutes the score was tied 2–2 and another overtime thriller was in the making. Harvard double-teamed Hale Palmer, the Elis' high-scoring winger, every time he touched the puck which enabled captain Putnam to score the winner early in the 10-minute extra-session.

The following week Harvard again prevented Palmer from scoring, but his work in the offensive end caused two of Yale's goals and the Bulldogs won the rematch 3–1. The playoff between the two would decide the Intercollegiate title and both teams prepared for a battle. Harvard, who had been outshone by Yale through most of the season, took two leads during the game but was unable to hold onto either for too long and, once more, overtime was required. Rather than attack, Yale held back, playing a defensive style much like Harvard and the two teams rarely threatened each other's netminders. The result was three rather dull overtime periods and the game ended in a draw.

Plans for a fourth and (hopefully) deciding game began immediately after the contest was over. A few days later, after a conference between the athletic directors of each school, W. J. Bingham of Harvard ultimately decided to end the Crimson's ice hockey season and leave the two without a clear victor. 1930 was the first time since 1900 that Harvard and Yale's ice hockey teams finished with a draw over the course of a season. The result was that both teams had claims to the eastern intercollegiate championship and would have to share the crown.

== Roster ==
No.	Nat.	Player	Class	Pos	Height	Weight	DoB	Hometown	Previous team
		S. L. Batchelder	Junior	D
		Wilson H. Crosby	Sophomore	LW/D
		John Cross	Senior	LW
		Charles C. Cunningham	Sophomore	D
		Charles D. Draper	Sophomore	G
		Harwood Ellis	Junior	G
		Horace D. Everett	Junior	LW/RW
	(United States)	John B. Garrison	Junior	C/D			1909-02-13	West Newton, Massachusetts
		Rene F. G. Giddens	Senior	RW
		John W. Hallowell	Junior	D
		Francis A. Harding	Senior	C
		Guy C. Holbrook Jr.	Senior	C/RW
		Charles B. Lakin	Senior	RW
		Eliot T. Putnam	Graduate	C/LW
		Frank R. Stubbs Jr.	Sophomore	RW
		W. Barry Wood Jr.	Sophomore	C/LW/D

== Standings ==
1929–30 Eastern Collegiate ice hockey standings
	Intercollegiate							Overall					
	GP	W	L	T	Pct.	GF	GA	GP	W	L	T	GF	GA
Amherst	9	2	7	0	.222	12	30	9	2	7	0	12	30
Army	10	6	2	2	.700	28	18	11	6	3	2	31	23
Bates	11	6	4	1	.591	28	21	11	6	4	1	28	21
Boston University	10	4	5	1	.450	34	31	13	4	8	1	40	48
Bowdoin	9	2	7	0	.222	12	29	9	2	7	0	12	29
Brown	–	–	–	–	–	–	–	12	8	3	1	46	25
Clarkson	6	4	2	0	.667	50	11	10	8	2	0	70	18
Colby	7	4	2	1	.643	19	15	7	4	2	1	19	15
Colgate	6	1	4	1	.250	9	19	6	1	4	1	9	19
Connecticut Agricultural	–	–	–	–	–	–	–	7	0	6	1	13	25
Cornell	6	4	2	0	.667	29	18	6	4	2	0	29	18
Dartmouth	–	–	–	–	–	–	–	13	5	8	0	44	54
Hamilton	–	–	–	–	–	–	–	8	4	4	0	24	19
Harvard	10	7	2	1	.750	44	14	14	9	4	1	56	29
Massachusetts Agricultural	11	7	4	0	.636	25	25	11	7	4	0	25	25
Middlebury	8	6	2	0	.750	26	13	8	6	2	0	26	13
MIT	8	4	4	0	.500	16	27	8	4	4	0	16	27
New Hampshire	11	3	6	2	.364	20	30	13	3	8	2	22	42
Northeastern	–	–	–	–	–	–	–	7	2	5	0	9	12
Norwich	–	–	–	–	–	–	–	6	0	4	2	4	12
Pennsylvania	10	4	6	0	.400	36	39	11	4	7	0	40	49
Princeton	–	–	–	–	–	–	–	18	9	8	1	47	50
Rensselaer	–	–	–	–	–	–	–	3	1	2	0	6	8
St. John's	–	–	–	–	–	–	–	4	1	3	0	9	14
St. Lawrence	–	–	–	–	–	–	–	4	0	4	0	4	40
St. Stephen's	–	–	–	–	–	–	–	7	5	2	0	21	19
Union	5	2	2	1	.500	8	18	5	2	2	1	8	18
Vermont	–	–	–	–	–	–	–	5	1	3	1	7	20
Villanova	1	0	1	0	.000	3	7	4	0	3	1	13	22
Wesleyan	–	–	–	–	–	–	–	3	0	2	1	6	20
Williams	9	4	4	1	.500	28	32	9	4	4	1	28	32
Yale	14	12	1	1	.893	80	21	19	17	1	1	110	28

== Schedule and results ==
Date	Opponent	Site	Result	Record
Regular Season
December 18	at Boston University*	Boston Arena • Boston, Massachusetts	W 4–0	1–0–0
December 20	at University Club of Boston*	Boston Arena • Boston, Massachusetts	W 4–3 ^{OT}	2–0–0
December 28	vs. Toronto*	Madison Square Garden • Manhattan, New York	L 2–3	2–1–0
January 2	Toronto*	Boston Garden • Boston, Massachusetts	L 2–6	2–2–0
January 6	MIT*	Boston Garden • Boston, Massachusetts	W 8–1	3–2–0
January 8	Michigan Tech*	Boston Garden • Boston, Massachusetts	W 11–0	4–2–0
January 15	Boston University*	Boston Garden • Boston, Massachusetts	W 6–1	5–2–0
February 5	at Marquette*	Boston Garden • Boston, Massachusetts	L 3–4	5–3–0
February 8	Dartmouth*	Davis Rink • Hanover, New Hampshire	W 2–1	6–3–0
February 12	at University Club of Boston*	Boston Arena • Boston, Massachusetts	W 4–3 ^{OT}	7–3–0
February 15	at Dartmouth*	Boston Garden • Boston, Massachusetts	W 4–0	8–3–0
March 1	at Yale*	New Haven Arena • New Haven, Connecticut (Rivalry)	W 3–2 ^{OT}	9–3–0
March 8	Yale*	Boston Garden • Boston, Massachusetts (Rivalry)	L 1–3	9–4–0
March 13	Yale*	Boston Garden • Boston, Massachusetts (Rivalry)	T 2–2 ^{3OT}	9–4–1
*Non-conference game.
