= Bill Millett =

American sports coach and professor (1901–1966)

Biographical details
- Born: July 8, 1901; Whitman, Massachusetts, U.S.
- Died: October 19, 1966 (aged 65); Waterville, Maine, U.S.
- Education: Colby College (B.S.); Columbia University (M.A.)

Playing career

Football
- 1921–1924: Colby
- Positions: Fullback (football); Defenseman, winger (ice hockey); Second baseman (baseball)

Coaching career (HC unless noted)

Football
- 1931–1941: Colby (freshmen)
- 1942: Colby
- 1945: Colby
- 1946–1947: Colby (freshmen)

Ice hockey
- 1927–1929: Colby (assistant)
- 1929–1942: Colby
- 1946–1948: Colby

Baseball
- 1925–1927: Waterville HS (ME)
- 1927–1930: Colby (assistant)
- 1930–1942: Colby (freshmen)
- 1933–1942: Colby (assistant)
- 1943–1944: Colby

Administrative career (AD unless noted)
- 1943–1945: Colby

Head coaching record
- Overall: 4–4–1 (college football); 73–57–9 {college ice hockey)

Ellsworth Willis "Bill" Millett (July 8, 1901 – October 19, 1966) was an American baseball, football, and ice hockey player and coach and college professor. He was a fixture at Colby College, in Waterville, Maine, for 25 years, before his retirement in 1948.

== Career ==
Millett began attending Colby College in the fall of 1921. He joined the baseball and football teams as a freshman, playing second base and fullback for the Mules. The following year he also joined the ice hockey team as a defenseman and sometime winger. He helped the Mules win or tie the state championship in all three in 1923. Millett graduated in 1925 and returned to his alma mater as an assistant coach two years later. Millett was eventually promoted to being the head coach of the ice hockey team in 1929 and the freshman baseball team the following spring. By the mid-30s he had taken over the freshman football squad and had also been hired on as an assistant professor by the school. During this time Millett had enrolled at Columbia University and earned his master's degree in 1939.

Millett remained with the college during World War II and served as acting athletic director in the absence of Mike Loebs. He was head coach of the football team for one season upon its return to play in 1945. In 1946, he served as interim basketball coach after Eddie Roundy fell seriously ill. The class of 1947 dedicated the school yearbook in his honor. In 1948, Millett was appointed to a fundraising committee for the Mayflower Hill Campus. Due to the requirements for the new project he was forced to turn over coaching duties to others.

Millett remained in Waterville after his retirement and died in 1966. Colby honors his memory by conferring the Bill Millett Award to one male and one female student athlete who have contributed the most to Colby Athletics over their four years at the college.

== Personal life and death ==
Millett married Mary Rollins in 1932 and they had two daughters; Mary, born in 1933 and Martha, born in 1937. Millett died on October 20, 1966, at Thayer Hospital in Waterville.

== Head coaching record ==
=== College football ===
Year	Team	Overall	Conference	Standing	Bowl/playoffs
Colby Mules (Maine Intercollegiate Athletic Association) (1942–1945)
1942	Colby	3–4	1–2		
1943	No team—World War II				
1944	No team—World War II				
1945	Colby	1–0–1			
Colby:		4–4–1			
Total:		4–4–1			

=== Ice hockey ===
Record table
Season	Team	Overall	Conference	Standing	Postseason
Colby Independent (1929–1936)
Colby (NEIHL) (1936–1942)
Colby (NEIHL) (1946–1948)
1947–48	Colby	2–6–0	1–4–0	10th	
Colby:		73–57–9			
Total:		73–57–9			
National champion Postseason invitational champion Conference regular season champion Conference regular season and conference tournament champion Division regular season champion Division regular season and conference tournament champion Conference tournament champion
