= 1928–29 Marquette Hilltoppers men's ice hockey season =

American college hockey season

- Conference: 2nd NIHA
- Home ice: Hilltop Rink

Record
- Overall: 9–5–0
- Conference: 7–4–0
- Home: 6–2–0
- Road: 3–3–0

Coaches and captains
- Head coach: Kay Iverson
- Captain: Pudge MacKenzie

The 1928–29 Marquette Hilltoppers men's ice hockey season was the 7th season of play for the program.

== Season ==
Marquette entered the year looking to repeat as league champions and, with most of their players returning, the newly renamed Hilltoppers would have a good chance. The "Two Macs", MacKenzie and McFadyen led the way at the start, opening the year with four huge wins over NIHL opponents. In the second game against Michigan, the play turned rough and several Hilltoppers ended up with serious injuries; McFadyen broke a rib MacKenzie was cut over the eye, Buck had four teeth knocked out and Horrigan sprained his ankle. This put the team in a difficult position 4 days later when they took on Chicago A.C.; rough play continued to the point when Marquette officials considered pulling their team off of the ice but they allowed the match to conclude with the Blue and Gold losing their first game of the season. When Marquette took on Wisconsin on the 18th, approximately 2,000 people showed up to see the Hilltoppers trounce the Badgers 9–0. The ice hockey team had become a big draw at Marquette and with the program continuing to play well under Kay Iverson, there was no reason to think that would change any time soon.

After a few weeks off, Marquette returned to the ice against Janesville at a nearby winter carnival. An easy victory set them up for a rematch against Chicago A.C. and the team got their revenge against the amateur club with a 4–1 victory. The following weekend was the first of two showdowns against Minnesota and the two best teams in the west. The Hilltoppers looked like a shoo-in to repeat their championship when they took the first game 5–2 but the Gophers rallied for a victory in the second game, handing the Blue and Gold their first conference loss of the season. Both games were seen by about 2,500 fans despite the bitter cold. After Marquette's final home game of the year, another victory, the team hit the road but were stunned by Wisconsin and handed a 0–1 loss. The result came as a surprise, especially considering the Blue and Gold's earlier 9–0 win. The loss was matched, however, with one by Minnesota a week earlier making the two teams essentially tied for the Intercollegiate lead. Marquette didn't play another game for three weeks and a final series was scheduled in Minnesota against the Gophers. The Hilltoppers didn't look rusty at all to start the game and they scored twice in the first to take a 2–1 lead. Unfortunately, Minnesota shut them down the rest of the game and scored three times to win 4–2. Marquette had to win the game to have any hope of holding on to their crown and both teams played a tough game. McFadyen scored in the second for the Hilltoppers but Minnesota's defense proved too good and skated to a 2–1 victory, consigning Marquette to runner-up status.

Oliver Seahawer served as team manager.

== Roster ==
No.	Nat.	Player	Class	Pos	Height	Weight	DoB	Hometown	Previous team
	(United States)	Clarence E. Barta	Freshman					Racine, Wisconsin
		Roy Buck		G
		John Cooper
	(United States)	Donald M. De Courcey	Senior					Saint Paul, Minnesota
	(United States)	R. Ward Dunphy	Sophomore					Milwaukee, Wisconsin
	(United States)	Rudolph P. Gingrass	Sophomore					Milwaukee, Wisconsin
		Paul Horrigan
	(United States)	Emil R. Kaminski	Junior					West Allis, Wisconsin
		Hank Kearns	Sophomore
	(Canada)	Clarence A. MacKenzie (C)	Junior	RW	5' 8" (1.73 m)	175 lb (79 kg)	1909-07-11	Cambridge, Massachusetts
	(United States)	Clifford H. McDonald	Junior					Sault Ste. Marie, Michigan
	(Canada)	Donald P. McFadyen	Junior	C	5' 9" (1.75 m)	163 lb (74 kg)	1907-03-24	Crossfield, Alberta
	(United States)	William E. Schultz	Sophomore	G				Neenah, Wisconsin
	(United States)	Cosmas B. Young	Sophomore					Fort Madison, Iowa
	(United States)	Francis L. Zimmerman	Senior	G				Milwaukee, Wisconsin

== Standings ==
1928–29 Western Collegiate ice hockey standings
	Intercollegiate							Overall					
	GP	W	L	T	Pct.	GF	GA	GP	W	L	T	GF	GA
California	–	–	–	–	–	–	–	–	–	–	–	–	–
Loyola	–	–	–	–	–	–	–	–	–	–	–	–	–
Marquette	11	7	4	0	.636	70	17	14	9	5	0	85	20
Michigan	14	4	9	1	.321	34	65	17	5	11	1	46	74
Michigan State	2	0	2	0	.000	3	17	7	3	3	1	23	19
Michigan Tech	8	1	4	3	.313	13	18	13	2	8	3	16	35
Minnesota	15	13	2	0	.867	57	12	17	14	2	1	62	13
North Dakota Agricultural	–	–	–	–	–	–	–	–	–	–	–	–	–
Wisconsin	13	5	6	2	.462	24	33	20	11	7	2	42	39
UCLA	3	0	3	0	.000	5	14	3	0	3	0	5	14
USC	–	–	–	–	–	–	–	–	–	–	–	–	–

== Schedule and results ==
Date	Opponent	Site	Result	Record
Regular season
January 6	North Dakota Agricultural	Hilltop Rink • Milwaukee, Wisconsin	W 12–0	1–0–0 (1–0–0)
January 7	North Dakota Agricultural	Hilltop Rink • Milwaukee, Wisconsin	W 11–1	2–0–0 (2–0–0)
January 11	at Michigan	Weinberg Coliseum • Ann Arbor, Michigan	W 10–1	3–0–0 (3–0–0)
January 12	at Michigan	Weinberg Coliseum • Ann Arbor, Michigan	W 13–1	4–0–0 (4–0–0)
January 16	Chicago A.C.*	Hilltop Rink • Milwaukee, Wisconsin	L 0–1	4–1–0
January 18	Wisconsin	Hilltop Rink • Milwaukee, Wisconsin	W 9–0	5–1–0 (5–0–0)
February 2	vs. Janesville A.C.*	Oconomowoc, Wisconsin (Oconomowoc Winter Carnival)	W 11–1	6–1–0
February 7	Chicago A.C.*	Hilltop Rink • Milwaukee, Wisconsin	W 4–1	7–1–0
February 11	Minnesota	Hilltop Rink • Milwaukee, Wisconsin	W 5–2	8–1–0 (6–0–0)
February 12	Minnesota	Hilltop Rink • Milwaukee, Wisconsin	L 2–3	8–2–0 (6–1–0)
February 16	Michigan	Hilltop Rink • Milwaukee, Wisconsin	W 5–2	9–2–0 (7–1–0)
February 21	at Wisconsin	Madison, Wisconsin	L 0–1	9–3–0 (7–2–0)
March 14	at Minnesota	Minneapolis Arena • Minneapolis, Minnesota	L 2–4	9–4–0 (7–3–0)
March 15	at Minnesota	Minneapolis Arena • Minneapolis, Minnesota	L 1–2 ^{†}	9–5–0 (7–4–0)
*Non-conference game.

† Minnesota records the score of the game as 2–0 in their favor.
