= 1929–30 Marquette Hilltoppers men's ice hockey season =

American college hockey season

Western Intercollegiate Champions
- Conference: 1st NIHA
- Home ice: Hilltop Rink

Record
- Overall: 12–4–0

Coaches and captains
- Head coach: Kay Iverson
- Captain: Don McFadyen

The 1929–30 Marquette Hilltoppers men's ice hockey season was the 8th season of play for the program.

== Season ==
After coming up short the previous year, Marquette did not shy away from a challenge and put together the toughest schedule the team had yet undertaken. The Hilltoppers began with a tour of northern Michigan and Minnesota, playing two city teams in Northern Minnesota. The team got a hard fight in the second half of their road trip but managed to hand Virginia its first loss of the season, having been 5–0 coming into the game. When the team returned home they took on Janesville A.C. and coach Iverson gave increased playing time to some of the newer player. Furlong and Moore responded with good performances, meaning that the team may be able to stay in the upper echelon of their division after the Two Macs graduated. In the drubbing of Janesville, despite not starting the match, MacKenzie and McFadyen each scored four goals.

With the team having settled back in Milwaukee, they welcomed in Minnesota for a tough series. The team pulled out a narrow win in the first game but the second was delayed for a day due to soft ice. After a cold night the teams finished off the series with Marquette laying into the Gophers with a 5–1 victory. The win not only had the Hilltoppers atop the league standings, but gave Minnesota their fourth consecutive loss and fifth overall, meaning it would be impossible for the Gophers to challenge for the Intercollegiate title this season. Marquette finished up their home schedule with a pair of wins while Moore and Furlong both continued to show improvement.

The Hilltoppers hit the road for the remainder of the season. First the team stopped off in Ann Arbor at the end of January but could only manage a split against the Wolverines. This was the first win for Michigan over Marquette but with the Hilltoppers' lead in the standings they could absorb the loss. A few days later the team met Harvard, playing an eastern team for the first time in program history, and produced a surprising result. The Blue and Gold played a nearly perfect game, coming away with a victory over the perennial power (who were in contention for the eastern crown themselves) "Porky" Furlong had his best game to date, scoring twice to push Marquette over the top and leaving little doubt that the western clubs deserved to be on equal footing with the traditional powers of the east. After downing Army, Marquette took on the best team in the nation and produced one of the most memorable games in the history of the program. Yale entered the game 12–0 and Marquette set about trying to dent the Bulldogs for the first time on the year. Owing to the skill of the Elis, Marquette used three defensive players at a time rather than the standard two, this was caused as much by Yale's offense as the fact that no one on the team could keep up with McFadyen and MacKenzie when the Macs were skating at full tilt. The plan did not seem to work at the start as Yale came away with a 2–0 lead after the first period. Marquette began to climb back in the second; the Macs alternated goals with Yale and cut the lead to one at the start of the third. The two teams fought hard but Marquette's long road trip began to wear on the team and Yale scored its fifth goal with less than four minutes to play. The Hilltoppers knew they were swamped; the Elis surged in the final few minutes, scoring three more times before the clock read '0' and turning a very tight game into a rout.

Even with the loss to Yale, Marquette had acquitted themselves well against the east. Games had been planned against Wisconsin and Michigan Tech, but had to be cancelled due to warm weather before their final series with Minnesota. When the two met at the beginning of March, Marquette was so far ahead in the standings that they had already sewn up the western championship but the two were not going to let that stop them, the teams still had a great deal of pride. The Hilltoppers split the series with the Gophers, ensuring that they had a winning record against all major competition and earned their second league championship in three seasons. The games would be the last two coached between the brothers Iverson as Emil, the Minnesota coach, had announced his resignation in February. After the season, Kay following his brother's example and resigned as the Hilltoppers' bench boss. The loss compounded the difficulties that were sure to result from losing MacKenzie and McFadyen to graduation.

== Roster ==
No.	Nat.	Player	Class	Pos	Height	Weight	DoB	Hometown	Previous team
	(United States)	Arthur F. Baier	Sophomore					Chilton, Wisconsin
	(United States)	Clifford F. Broderick	Sophomore					Milwaukee, Wisconsin
	(United States)	R. Ward Dunphy	Junior					Milwaukee, Wisconsin
	(United States)	Clarence J. Furlong	Sophomore					Hibbing, Minnesota
		Cyril Hegy	Junior
	(United States)	Emil R. Kaminski	Senior	D				West Allis, Wisconsin
	(Canada)	Clarence A. MacKenzie	Senior	RW	5' 8" (1.73 m)	175 lb (79 kg)	1909-07-11	Cambridge, Massachusetts
	(United States)	Clifford H. McDonald	Senior					Sault Ste. Marie, Michigan
	(Canada)	Donald P. McFadyen (C)	Senior	C	5' 9" (1.75 m)	163 lb (74 kg)	1907-03-24	Crossfield, Alberta
	(Canada)	Harold K. McFadyen	Sophomore	D				Crossfield, Alberta
		James Moore	Sophomore	LW
	(United States)	William E. Schultz	Junior	G				Neenah, Wisconsin
		Snavely
	(United States)	Cosmas B. Young	Junior					Fort Madison, Iowa

== Standings ==
1929–30 Western Collegiate ice hockey standings
	Intercollegiate							Overall					
	GP	W	L	T	Pct.	GF	GA	GP	W	L	T	GF	GA
Loyola	–	–	–	–	–	–	–	–	–	–	–	–	–
Marquette	12	9	3	0	.750	39	26	16	12	4	0	60	33
Michigan	19	10	7	2	.579	47	34	21	12	7	2	55	36
Michigan State	2	0	2	0	.000	1	14	5	1	4	0	5	18
Michigan Tech	10	2	7	1	.250	14	48	13	5	7	1	56	51
Minnesota	16	7	8	1	.469	38	35	18	7	9	2	42	44
North Dakota	1	0	1	0	.000	1	6	1	0	1	0	1	6
North Dakota Agricultural	–	–	–	–	–	–	–	–	–	–	–	–	–
Wisconsin	11	5	5	1	.500	20	23	12	5	6	1	22	26

== Schedule and results ==
Date	Opponent	Site	Result	Record
Regular season
December 24	at Michigan Tech	Houghton, Michigan ^{†}	W 3–1	1–0–0 (1–0–0)
December 28	at Hibbing City	Hibbing, Minnesota	W 5–0	2–0–0
December 30	at Hibbing City	Hibbing, Minnesota	L 2–3 ^{2OT}	2–1–0
?	at Virginia	Virginia, Minnesota	W 4–3	3–1–0
January 10	Janesville A.C.*	Hilltop Rink • Milwaukee, Wisconsin	W 10–1	4–1–0
January 13	Minnesota	Hilltop Rink • Milwaukee, Wisconsin	W 2–1	5–1–0 (2–0–0)
January 15	Minnesota	Hilltop Rink • Milwaukee, Wisconsin	W 5–1	6–1–0 (3–0–0)
January 22	Michigan	Hilltop Rink • Milwaukee, Wisconsin	W 3–1	7–1–0 (4–0–0)
January 25	Wisconsin	Hilltop Rink • Milwaukee, Wisconsin	W 4–0	8–1–0 (5–0–0)
January 30	at Michigan	Weinberg Coliseum • Ann Arbor, Michigan	L 1–4	8–2–0 (5–1–0)
January 31	at Michigan	Weinberg Coliseum • Ann Arbor, Michigan	W 3–2	9–2–0 (6–1–0)
February 2	at Harvard*	Boston Garden • Boston, Massachusetts	W 4–3	10–2–0
February 8	vs. Army*	Lake Popolopen • Bear Mountain, New York	W 5–1	11–2–0
February 11	at Yale*	New Haven Arena • New Haven, Connecticut	L 3–8	11–3–0
March 3	at Minnesota	Minneapolis Arena • Minneapolis, Minnesota	L 2–3	11–4–0 (6–2–0)
March 4	at Minnesota	Minneapolis Arena • Minneapolis, Minnesota	W 4–1	12–4–0 (7–2–0)
*Non-conference game.

† Michigan Tech records the game as being played in Milwaukee.
