= 1929–30 UCLA Bruins men's ice hockey season =

Intercollegiate hockey season

- Conference: 3rd PCC
- Home ice: Palais de Glace

Record
- Overall: 0–4–1
- Conference: 0–4–1

Coaches and captains
- Head coach: Harvey Tafe
- Captain: Clarence Scott

The 1929–30 UCLA Bruins men's ice hockey season was the program's fourth season of play.

== Season ==
After the turmoil of the previous season, the team was well served by having some stability. While the coach and captain returned, most of the team was different than the previous season and that did not help the Bruins against their two opponents. They faced California and USC in two series during the year and didn't win a single game. In most games the team's defense was good enough to keep the score close but, as it had been last year, the offense was lacking. Only towards the end of the year did UCLA look like a unified squad. While it was too late to salvage the 1930 season, since most of the players were to return for the following year there was some hope of improvement from the Bruins.

The ice hockey team was the only minor sport at UCLA that was able to turn a profit for the year. Jacobs served as team manager. UCLA used the same colors as University of California, Berkeley until 1949.

== Roster ==
No.	Nat.	Player	Class	Pos	Height	Weight	DoB	Hometown	Previous team
	(United States)	J. Albert Bertea	Freshman					Los Angeles, California
		Chadwick
		Donald Clow		F
		Cothran
		Vincent Ford		D
		William Halstead
		Holyman
	(United States)	F. Harleigh Kyson	Freshman	G				Hollywood, California
		Francis LaGasse
	(United States)	John McMillan	Junior					Los Angeles, California
		Alberto Pearson		D
	(United States)	William L. Schaefer	Junior					Montrose, California
	(United States)	Clarence L. Scott (C)	Junior	F				Los Angeles, California
	(United States)	Rollin E. Staples	Senior					Los Angeles, California
	(United States)	Claude H. Van Norman	Junior					Independence, California

== Standings ==
1929–30 Pacific Coast Conference ice hockey standings
	Conference							Overall					
	GP	W	L	T	PTS	GF	GA	GP	W	L	T	GF	GA
California	–	–	–	–	–	–	–	–	–	–	–	–	–
USC	–	–	–	–	–	–	–	–	–	–	–	–	–
UCLA	5	0	4	1	.100	8	21	5	0	4	1	8	21
* indicates conference champion

== Schedule and results ==
Date	Opponent	Site	Result	Record
Regular Season
?	California	Palais de Glace • Los Angeles, California	L 0–4	0–1–0 (0–1–0)
?	vs. USC	Palais de Glace • Los Angeles, California	L 1–4	0–2–0 (0–2–0)
?	California	Palais de Glace • Los Angeles, California	L 1–2	0–3–0 (0–3–0)
?	vs. USC	Palais de Glace • Los Angeles, California	T 3–3	0–3–1 (0–3–1)
?	vs. USC	Palais de Glace • Los Angeles, California	L 3–8	0–4–1 (0–4–1)
*Non-conference game.
