= 1930–31 Marquette Hilltoppers men's ice hockey season =

American college hockey season

- Conference: Independent
- Home ice: Hilltop Rink

Record
- Overall: 8–5–1
- Home: 4–0–1
- Road: 4–5–0

Coaches and captains
- Head coach: John W. Hancock
- Captain: William Schultz

The 1930–31 Marquette Hilltoppers men's ice hockey season was the 9th season of play for the program.

== Season ==
Before the season began, Marquette had to content with forces that were affecting everyone in the region. The reality of the Great Depression was beginning to set in and two NIHL member schools suspended their programs (Michigan State and North Dakota Agricultural College). While the league was effectively dissolved by that point, Marquette's team was popular enough to stave off oblivion for the time being, but the Hilltoppers saw an old nemesis rear it head. The region experienced a warm winter, costing the team much-needed practice time. With a great many new faces in the lineup and a new head coach to boot, Marquette opened with a sleepy first game before coach Hancock took the team on a northern trip. In their 3-game swing through Minnesota the team got the needed ice time and began working together. The Hilltoppers didn't have the same scoring punch they had with the loss of their two Canadian stars, but the Blue and Gold could play defense well.

Marquette headed to Madison for their first intercollegiate game of the season and took on the Badgers. Wisconsin had just come off of back-to-back shutouts over Michigan and continued their stellar play by holding the Hilltoppers to a single goal. Marquette's defense was up to the challenge and allowed just one score themselves, leading the game into overtime. During the extra time, captain Bill Schultz made a save on a 15-foot shot but the referee ruled that he had been behind the goal line and counted a score for the Badgers. Marquette was unable to equal the score before time expired and found themselves behind the eight ball. Marquette returned home and played host to Michigan the next weekend. Unfortunately, the ice at the rink became slushy and the first game was marred by slow play. The Hilltoppers eked out a 4–2 victory in overtime but, due to the poor ice, Michigan called off the second game.

A few days afterwards, Minnesota arrived in Milwaukee but the Gophers were still finding their feet with a new bench boss. After a close game that ended in a draw, Marquette dominated the second match and won 6–3. Just when it looked like the Hilltoppers had a chance at another Intercollegiate title, warm weather forced them to take a few weeks off with sparse practice time. When they arrived in Ann Arbor they were met by a Michigan team looking for revenge. The Wolverines swamped the Hilltoppers, winning both games in the series and leaping ahead of Marquette in the process. The Hilltoppers travelled to Minneapolis the next weekend and battled the Gophers in the second series of the year. Marquette's defense was much improved from the week before and the Hilltoppers limited Minnesota to a single goal in each game. After sweeping the series they returned home and managed to play one more game, evening the score with Wisconsin, before ending their season earlier than usual.

The two losses to Michigan cost Marquette an opportunity to win an Intercollegiate title but the team still performed well in spite of the troubles they faced.

== Roster ==
No.	Nat.	Player	Class	Pos	Height	Weight	DoB	Hometown	Previous team
	(United States)	Arthur F. Baier	Junior					Chilton, Wisconsin
	(United States)	R. Ward Dunphy	Senior					Milwaukee, Wisconsin
	(United States)	Sverre A. Elnes	Junior	F				Hibbing, Minnesota
	(Canada)	George L. Finkbeiner	Freshman	F				Listowel, Ontario
	(United States)	Clarence J. Furlong	Junior	F				Hibbing, Minnesota
		Roderick MacDonald		F
	(Canada)	Harry J. McCann	Sophomore	F				Sydney, Nova Scotia
	(Canada)	Harold K. McFadyen	Junior	D				Crossfield, Alberta
		James Moore	Junior	LW
		Archibald Nicholson		F
		Ras Nielsen
	(United States)	Arthur Peterson		D				Duluth, Minnesota
	(United States)	William E. Schultz (C)	Senior	G				Neenah, Wisconsin
		Oscar Wettlaufer		F

== Standings ==
1930–31 Western Collegiate ice hockey standings
	Intercollegiate							Overall					
	GP	W	L	T	Pct.	GF	GA	GP	W	L	T	GF	GA
Marquette	9	5	3	1	.611	19	18	14	8	5	1	30	22
Michigan	12	7	4	1	.625	21	16	17	10	5	2	40	25
Michigan Tech	4	0	4	0	.000	5	20	9	2	7	0	14	27
Minnesota	15	6	8	1	.433	35	30	19	7	11	1	48	50
Minnesota–Duluth	0	0	0	0	–	0	0	3	0	3	0	4	15
North Dakota	–	–	–	–	–	–	–	1	0	1	0	–	–
Wisconsin	9	4	4	1	.500	10	12	11	4	6	1	13	19

== Schedule and results ==
Date	Opponent	Site	Result	Record
Regular season
December ?	American Legion of Chicago*	Hilltop Rink • Milwaukee, Wisconsin	W 3–0	1–0–0
December ?	at Duluth A.C.*	Duluth, Minnesota	L 1–2	1–1–0
December ?	at Hibbing Junior College*	Hibbing, Minnesota	L 1–2	1–2–0
December ?	at Hibbing Junior College*	Hibbing, Minnesota	W 3–0	2–2–0
January 1	at Wausau A.C.*	Wausau, Wisconsin	W 3–0	3–2–0
January 2	at Wisconsin*	Madison, Wisconsin	L 1–2 ^{OT}	3–3–0
January 9	Michigan*	Hilltop Rink • Milwaukee, Wisconsin	W 4–2 ^{†} ^{2OT}	4–3–0
January 12	Minnesota*	Hilltop Rink • Milwaukee, Wisconsin	T 1–1 ^{2OT}	4–3–1
January 13	Minnesota*	Hilltop Rink • Milwaukee, Wisconsin	W 6–3	5–3–1
January 29	at Michigan*	Weinberg Coliseum • Ann Arbor, Michigan	L 1–4	5–4–1
January 30	at Michigan*	Weinberg Coliseum • Ann Arbor, Michigan	L 0–4	5–5–1
February 5	at Minnesota*	Minneapolis Arena • Minneapolis, Minnesota	W 3–1	6–5–1
February 6	at Minnesota*	Minneapolis Arena • Minneapolis, Minnesota	W 2–1 ^{OT}	7–5–1
February 11	Wisconsin*	Hilltop Rink • Milwaukee, Wisconsin	W 1–0	8–5–1
*Non-conference game.

† Michigan archives list the game with a 3–2 score.
