= 1927–28 Marquette Blue and Gold men's ice hockey season =

American college hockey season

Western Intercollegiate Champion
- Conference: 1st NIHA
- Home ice: Hilltop Rink

Record
- Overall: 12–1–1
- Conference: 6–1–1

Coaches and captains
- Head coach: Kay Iverson
- Captain: Andrew Jackson

The 1927–28 Marquette Blue and Gold men's ice hockey season was the 6th season of play for the program.

== Season ==
There was again quite a bit of change from last years' varsity team, including the "Three Macs" being reduced to two with George McTeer transferring to McGill University. Fortunately, the other two Macs stayed and spearheaded a season for the ages. At the end of the previous season, at the invitation of Minnesota's head coach Emil Iverson (the brother of Kay Iverson), Marquette joined with several other regional schools to form the Northern Intercollegiate Hockey Association. The group of 16 schools, included some members of the MIAC and two junior colleges. The organization was designed to codify rules under which the midwestern teams would play and give support to members by attempting to schedule one another where applicable. The 'major' universities included Michigan, Michigan State, Michigan Tech, Minnesota and Wisconsin, all of the schools who participated for the regional intercollegiate championship. The result of their association was that Marquette was able to play an expansive schedule against other colleges and use their revamped lineup to great effect.

The Blue and Gold began the season with two overpowering games against a local amateur club. McFadyen and MacKenzie demonstrated that they had lost none of their speed and talent in the two games and the rest of the team was coming along as well. After another pair of wins over a second local club, Marquette played their first intercollegiate game of the season and escaped with a narrow victory over Wisconsin. The team had a long layoff before returning to the ice in late January and attending their second Wausau tournament. This time the hilltoppers won both games and prepared for the start of their Michigan road trip. The team played three games in three days, beginning with a relatively easy victory over Michigan State and then began to look tired in the two matches against Michigan. The Wolverines were not a good team that season, winning just 2 of 13 games, but they seemed to find their game against the Blue and Gold. Fortunately, Marquette was able to skate to victory in both games and returned home for a showdown against the powerhouse, Minnesota.

The Gophers were coming off of a bad series at Wisconsin and seemed lost playing near the Illinois border. They were routed by the Blue and Gold, keeping Marquette's record pristine and placing the hilltoppers firmly at the top of the league standings. After a second victory over Wisconsin a week later, Marquette was just one game away from capturing their first championship and they headed to Minneapolis at the end of the month with that goal in mind. Because Minnesota had two losses in league play, the Gophers would have to win both games against Marquette to surpass the Blue and Gold. In the first game, Marquette fought a much more even duel with the Maroons and, in front of 5,000 spectators, the game was a defensive battle throughout regulation. The teams were tied at one apiece going into overtime and it took until the second extra session for another goal to be scored. Minnesota was finally able to pull ahead and then tried to hold onto their lead (sudden death rules were not in effect) but McFadyen managed to even the score before time had expired and the game was declared a draw. The tie meant that Minnesota, who was 8–2–2 in league play, couldn't finish ahead of Marquette (6–0–1) so the Blue and Gold were guaranteed the Western Intercollegiate title. The Gophers got a bit of revenge in the final game, preventing Marquette from finishing with an undefeated record, but Iverson's team were Collegiate Champions.

John Boman served as team manager.

== Roster ==
No.	Nat.	Player	Class	Pos	Height	Weight	DoB	Hometown	Previous team
		Roy Buck		G
	(United States)	Donald M. De Courcey	Junior					Saint Paul, Minnesota
	(United States)	John M. Hanley	Sophomore					Calumet, Michigan
	(United States)	Claire J. E. Harrington	Sophomore					West Allis, Wisconsin
		Paul Horrigan
	(United States)	Andrew E. Jackson (C)	Junior	G				Milwaukee, Wisconsin
	(United States)	Emil R. Kaminski	Sophomore					West Allis, Wisconsin
		Hank Kearns
	(Canada)	Clarence A. MacKenzie	Sophomore	RW	5' 8" (1.73 m)	175 lb (79 kg)	1909-07-11	Cambridge, Massachusetts
	(United States)	Clifford H. McDonald	Sophomore					Sault Ste. Marie, Michigan
	(Canada)	Donald P. McFadyen	Sophomore	C	5' 9" (1.75 m)	163 lb (74 kg)	1907-03-24	Crossfield, Alberta
	(United States)	William E. Schmitz	Junior					Saint Joseph, Missouri
	(United States)	Gerald J. Sylvian	Sophomore					Butte, Montana
	(United States)	Cosmas B. Young	Freshman					Fort Madison, Iowa

== Standings ==
1927–28 Western Collegiate ice hockey standings
	Intercollegiate							Overall					
	GP	W	L	T	Pct.	GF	GA	GP	W	L	T	GF	GA
Marquette	8	6	1	1	.813	25	12	14	12	1	1	62	23
Michigan	12	2	9	1	.208	12	27	13	2	10	1	12	31
Michigan State	4	1	3	0	.250	4	14	6	3	3	0	6	14
Michigan Tech	–	–	–	–	–	–	–	6	5	1	0	–	–
Minnesota	13	9	2	2	.769	49	15	13	9	2	2	49	15
North Dakota Agricultural	–	–	–	–	–	–	–	–	–	–	–	–	–
Occidental	–	–	–	–	–	–	–	–	–	–	–	–	–
UCLA	5	1	4	0	.200	10	17	5	1	4	0	10	17
USC	–	–	–	–	–	–	–	–	–	–	–	–	–
Wisconsin	12	3	6	3	.375	14	27	16	5	7	4	23	32

== Schedule and results ==
Date	Opponent	Site	Result	Record
Regular season
December ?	Kearns Service*	Milwaukee, Wisconsin	W 11–2	1–0–0
December ?	Kearns Service*	Milwaukee, Wisconsin	W 11–4	2–0–0
?	Milwaukee A.C.*	Milwaukee, Wisconsin	W 5–3	3–0–0
?	Milwaukee A.C.*	Milwaukee, Wisconsin	W 4–1	4–0–0
January 6	at Wisconsin	Madison, Wisconsin	W 3–2	5–0–0 (1–0–0)
January ?	at Wausau A.C.*	Wausau, Wisconsin (Wausau Ice Carnival)	W 3–1	6–0–0
January ?	vs. Rhinelander A.C.*	Wausau, Wisconsin (Wausau Ice Carnival)	W 3–0	7–0–0
February 2	at Michigan State	East Lansing, Michigan	W 5–1	8–0–0 (2–0–0)
February 3 ^{†}	at Michigan	Weinberg Coliseum • Ann Arbor, Michigan	W 3–1	9–0–0 (3–0–0)
February 4 ^{†}	at Michigan	Weinberg Coliseum • Ann Arbor, Michigan	W 1–0	10–0–0 (4–0–0)
February 7	Minnesota	Hilltop Rink • Milwaukee, Wisconsin	W 4–0 ^{†}	11–0–0 (5–0–0)
February 15 ^{†}	Wisconsin	Hilltop Rink • Milwaukee, Wisconsin	W 6–2	12–0–0 (6–0–0)
February 28	at Minnesota	Minneapolis Arena • Minneapolis, Minnesota	T 2–2 ^{2OT}	12–0–1 (6–0–1)
March 1	at Minnesota	Minneapolis Arena • Minneapolis, Minnesota	L 1–4	12–1–1 (6–1–1)
*Non-conference game.

† Michigan archives incorrectly list the two games as being played in January. Minnesota records the score of the game as 4–1. Wisconsin has the game being played on February 15.
