= 1926–27 Michigan College of Mines Huskies men's ice hockey season =

- Conference: Independent

Record
- Overall: 5–1–0
- Home: 1–0–0
- Road: 3–1–0
- Neutral: 1–0–0

Coaches and captains
- Head coach: Carlos Haug
- Captain: Paul Pesonen

The 1926–27 Michigan College of Mines Huskies men's ice hockey season was the 8th season of play for the program. The Huskies were coached by Carlos Haug in his 1st season.

== Season ==
This season brought about a great change in the ice hockey program. First, though the team was once again led by a new coach, Carlos Haug was an experienced player in his own right, having won the U.S. Amateur Championship with the Portage Lakers in 1913. Additionally, the team was finally able to switch back to an intercollegiate schedule, playing all of their games against fellow colleges this season.

The Huskies opened the year at Michigan and looked disjoined for most of the game. The offense was rarely able to put together any kind of attack though the visitors were kept in the match thanks to a solid defensive effort. Only one goal got past Pesonen but it was enough to sink the Huskies. The following evening, the Miners repaid the favor with a 1–0 win of their own thanks to a second period tally from Tessen and a suffocating brand of checking throughout the match.

A week later, the team travelled to South Bend and took on Notre Dame. After the match was delayed for a day due to poor ice, The Miners netted two early goals put the Huskies ahead for good. The defense was once more the star of the game with the Irish rarely threatening to score. The Huskies returned home and waited for Notre Dame to arrive for a return series. There, the offense asserted itself with the Miners netting 10 goals in the two games.

The team finished the year with a short jaunt south to take on Marquette. In the first meeting between the two programs, Michigan College of Mines piled up the goals. The Huskies netted seven markers on the evening to take the match and improve to 5–1 on the year. Despite the solid finish, the school was unable to claim the western intercollegiate title as they had not played any of the Minnesota schools and their wins over Notre Dame and Marquette came against questionable teams.

== Roster ==
No.	Nat.	Player	Class	Pos	Height	Weight	DoB	Hometown	Previous team
		Crawford		D
		Gillis
		Koleman		C
		Latva		D
		Mason
		Nelson
		Ollila
		Paul Pesonen (C)		G
		Roy		RW
		Tessen		LW

== Standings ==
1926–27 Western Collegiate ice hockey standings
	Intercollegiate							Overall					
	GP	W	L	T	Pct.	GF	GA	GP	W	L	T	GF	GA
California Southern Campus	6	6	0	0	1.000	19	7	6	6	0	0	19	7
Marquette	1	0	1	0	.000	4	7	7	5	2	0	33	18
Michigan	–	–	–	–	–	–	–	13	9	4	0	17	12
Michigan College of Mines	6	5	1	0	.833	21	8	6	5	1	0	21	8
Michigan State	–	–	–	–	–	–	–	4	1	3	0	7	9
Minnesota	–	–	–	–	–	–	–	15	9	6	0	–	–
North Dakota Agricultural	–	–	–	–	–	–	–	–	–	–	–	–	–
Notre Dame	8	2	6	0	.250	8	29	11	3	7	1	11	34
Occidental	–	–	–	–	–	–	–	–	–	–	–	–	–
Southwestern	–	–	–	–	–	–	–	–	–	–	–	–	–
USC	–	–	–	–	–	–	–	–	–	–	–	–	–
Wisconsin	–	–	–	–	–	–	–	10	1	9	0	–	–

== Schedule and results ==
Date	Opponent	Site	Result	Record
Regular Season
January 17	at Michigan*	Weinberg Coliseum • Ann Arbor, Michigan	L 0–1	0–1–0
January 18	at Michigan*	Weinberg Coliseum • Ann Arbor, Michigan	W 1–0	1–1–0
January 22	at Notre Dame*	St. Mary's Lake • South Bend, Indiana	W 3–0	2–1–0
February 4	vs. Notre Dame*	Calumet Colosseum • Calumet, Michigan	W 4–0	3–1–0
February 5	Notre Dame*	Mohawk Glacidome • Houghton, Michigan	W 6–3	4–1–0
February 18	at Marquette*	Hilltop Rink • Milwaukee, Wisconsin	W 7–4 ^{†}	5–1–0
*Non-conference game.

† Marquette's records have the final score being 5–3 in favor of the Huskies.
