= 1930–31 UCLA Bruins men's ice hockey season =

Intercollegiate hockey season

- Conference: 2nd PCC
- Home ice: Palais de Glace

Record
- Overall: 6–4–0
- Conference: 2–3–0

Coaches and captains
- Head coach: Harvey Tafe
- Assistant coaches: Colonel Bain
- Captain: Don Clow

The 1930–31 UCLA Bruins men's ice hockey season was the fifth season of play for the program.

== Season ==
Hopes were high for the Burins entering the season as the team returned several starters while California and USC lost many of their players to graduation. There was also a push for the team to be reclassified as a major sport since it had turned a profit the previous year, as opposed to some actual major sports, namely baseball, tennis and track.

The team began the season with a winter carnival held at Lake Yosemite. The Bruins were entered in both the ice hockey and speed skating events and the school with the best combined finish would be awarded the President Herbert Hoover Cup. Despite high hopes, several injuries severely curtailed UCLA's ability compete. Eight players were injured with ailments ranging from a broken nose to a dislocated elbow. Worse, assistant coach Colonel Bain was struck in the head by a stick while standing on the bench. He received a concussion and a cut that required 8 stitches to close and it was possible he might lose sight in one eye. The team's second game resulted in the program's first win in almost 2 years and did give hope for the Bruins in spite of the injuries.

UCLA was scheduled to compete in a second winter carnival, this time at Lake Arrowhead, but transportation difficulties caused the team to arrive just before night and the game was postponed. After winning their second game of the season, UCLA had to go into the rematch with Loyola missing their star center, Clarence Scott, who was suffering from a punctured Kidney. The team as a whole was rather battered by this point and the game was eventually postponed until later in the year.

When the team returned to action in late February, coach Tafe made several lineup changes, including placing "Frenchy" LaGasse in goal. The team ended up producing its best effort to that point, winning the game 4–1. At this point the Bruins were well in the mix for a championship but they would have to do something they had never done in program history; defeat USC. With Scott still recovering from his Kidney injury, the team met the Trojans for the third time that season. Once again the game went into overtime and, once again, Southern California ended as the winner. The two teams had planned on having up to 5 games between one another during the season but, with USC already possessing two wins in conference play, the third game could end up being the last.

USC won the final match, shutting down the entire Bruin offense. Coach Tafe was so dissatisfied with his captain's play that he demoted Clow to the second line for the remainder of the season. UCLA used the same colors as the University of California, Berkeley until 1949.

== Roster ==
No.	Nat.	Player	Class	Pos	Height	Weight	DoB	Hometown	Previous team
		Leonard Bergdahl	Sophomore	D
		Donald Clow (C)		F
		Jack De La Haye	Sophomore	F
	(United States)	Edgar R. Haley	Sophomore	F				Santa Monica, California
		William Halstead		F
	(United States)	F. Harleigh Kyson	Sophomore	G				Hollywood, California
		Francis LaGasse		G/D
		John W. McCloskey	Freshman	D
	(United States)	John McMillan	Junior					Los Angeles, California
		Alberto Pearson		D
		Jack Price		F
	(United States)	William L. Schaefer	Senior					Montrose, California
	(United States)	Clarence L. Scott	Senior	F				Los Angeles, California

== Standings ==
1930–31 Pacific Coast Conference ice hockey standings
	Conference							Overall					
	GP	W	L	T	PTS	GF	GA	GP	W	L	T	GF	GA
USC *	–	–	–	–	–	–	–	–	–	–	–	–	–
California	–	–	–	–	–	–	–	–	–	–	–	–	–
Loyola	–	–	–	–	–	–	–	–	–	–	–	–	–
UCLA	5	2	3	0	.400	8	9	10	6	4	0	–	–
* indicates conference champion

== Schedule and results ==
Date	Opponent	Site	Result	Record
Yosemite Sports Carnival
January ?	vs. USC*	Lake Yosemite • California (Game 1)	L 1–2	0–1–0
January ?	vs. California	Lake Yosemite • California (Game 2)	W 4–3	1–1–0
Regular Season
February 5	vs. USC	Palais de Glace • Los Angeles, California	L 1–2 ^{OT}	1–2–0 (0–1–0)
February 7	vs. Loyola	Palais de Glace • Los Angeles, California	W 1–0	2–2–0 (1–1–0)
February 28	California	Palais de Glace • Los Angeles, California	W 4–1	3–2–0 (2–1–0)
March 7	vs. USC	Palais de Glace • Los Angeles, California	L 2–3 ^{OT}	3–3–0 (2–2–0)
March 12	vs. Los Angeles A.C.*	Palais de Glace • Los Angeles, California	W 5–2	4–3–0
March 14	vs. USC	Palais de Glace • Los Angeles, California	L 0–3	4–4–0 (2–3–0)
?	vs. Los Angeles A.C.*	Palais de Glace • Los Angeles, California	W ?	5–4–0
March 19	vs. Los Angeles A.C.*	Palais de Glace • Los Angeles, California	W 3–1	6–4–0
*Non-conference game.
