= Kay Iverson =

Canadian ice hockey coach

Biographical details
- Born: Copenhagen, Denmark

Coaching career (HC unless noted)
- 1924–1926: Wisconsin
- 1926–1930: Marquette
- 1932: Tulsa Oilers

Head coaching record
- Overall: 47–22–6 (.667)

Accomplishments and honors

Championships
- 1928 West Intercollegiate Championship; 1930 West Intercollegiate Championship

Kay Iverson was a Danish-born Canadian ice hockey coach who led Marquette to two intercollegiate championships.

== Career ==
Iverson followed his older brother Emil into the coaching ranks of college hockey when he became the third head coach for the program at Wisconsin in 1924. After a poor first season, the Badgers produced the team's first winning record in 1926. In the offseason, Iverson left Wisconsin and made the short trek to Milwaukee to take over at Marquette. His first recruiting class included three Canadian players; Pudge MacKenzie, Don McFadyen, and George McTeer, nicknamed "the three Macs". Those players formed the nucleus of the team and helped the Blue and Gold produce its first winning season.

McTeer left after just one year, but the other two remained. Iverson built the program around their talents and the team went nearly undefeated in 1928, winning the western intercollegiate championship after claiming the season series over Minnesota. After finishing in second place the following year, Marquette returned to the top of the field in 1930, managing to defeat Harvard during the year.

Iverson left Marquette after the second championship and was later the coach for the Tulsa Oilers at the start of the 1932–33 season.

== Head coaching record ==
Record table
Season	Team	Overall	Conference	Standing	Postseason
Wisconsin Badgers Independent (1924–1926)
1924–25	Wisconsin	1–7–1			
1925–26	Wisconsin	8–3–4			
Wisconsin:		9–10–5			
Marquette Blue and Gold Independent (1926–1928)
1926–27	Marquette	5–2–0			
1927–28	Marquette	12–1–1			
Marquette:		17–3–1			
Marquette Hilltoppers Independent (1928–1930)
1928–29	Marquette	9–5–0			
1929–30	Marquette	12–4–0			
Marquette:		21–9–0			
Total:		47–22–6			
National champion Postseason invitational champion Conference regular season champion Conference regular season and conference tournament champion Division regular season champion Division regular season and conference tournament champion Conference tournament champion
