= Polar Palace =

Indoor, artificial ice rink

- Glacier Palace; Winter Garden
- Interactive map of Polar Palace
- Location: 613 N. Van Ness Ave; Los Angeles, California, 90004
- Coordinates: 34°04′56″N 118°18′57″W
- Capacity: 6,500
- Surface: 220 x 100 ft.

Construction
- Opened: 1928
- Closed: May 16, 1963
- Demolished: 1963 (fire)

Tenants
- UCLA Bruins men's ice hockey (1934–1938); USC Trojans men's ice hockey (1934–1938)

The Polar Palace in Los Angeles, California was an indoor, artificial ice rink. Primarily used as a figure skating rink, the building was also used for ice hockey and carnival shows throughout the years.

== History ==
Plans for the "Glacier Palace" began as far back as March 1925, however, less than a year later the Palais de Glace opened a few blocks away from the proposed site. Despite the competition, the second venue was built and opened its doors in 1928. The venue was larger, both in its ice surface (220 by 100 ft.) and seating capacity (6,500 vs. 4,500). However, rather than compete for the same events, the Glacier Palace was used mostly as a figure skating rink, leaving ice hockey to the other site. Those plans were changed in 1934 when the Palais de Glace burned down and the existing ice hockey teams moved to since-renamed Polar Palace.

During this time, Sonja Henie began holding ice shows at the Polar Palace which helped launch her film career. Once the Tropical Ice Gardens opened in 1938, the ice hockey teams left. With much more ice time now available and Henie helping to popularize ice shows, the Ice Follies arrived for the first time in May 14 of that year while the Ice Capades were not far behind.

The rink played host to those shows, as well as several figure skating championships, for many years. Despite being remodeled in 1960, the building was starting to show its age and most of the events were moved over to the newer and larger Los Angeles Memorial Sports Arena.

== Fire ==
On May 16, 1963, at approximately 3:00 am local time, old wiring in the rink's coffee shop caught fire. The flames spread quickly and soon the entire building was ablaze. One of the Palace guards, who lived across the street, rushed to the building when the alarm was raised but by then it was already too late. It took 90 firefighters from 15 companies just to contain the conflagration but when everything was said and done, the Polar Palace was gone.

Afterwards, the rink's trustees decided against rebuilding, allowing the Polar Palace to fade into history.
