= 1925–26 Notre Dame Fighting Irish men's ice hockey season =

- Conference: Independent
- Home ice: St. Mary's Lake

Record
- Overall: 3–2–1
- Home: 1–0–0
- Road: 2–2–1

Coaches and captains
- Head coach: Tom Lieb; Hector McNeil
- Captain: Gerald Timmins

The 1925–26 Notre Dame Fighting Irish men's ice hockey season was the 9th season of play for the program. The team was coached by Tom Lieb in his 3rd season and Hector McNeil in his 1st.

== Season ==
Notre Dame received welcome news at the start of the season with the weather dropping in late December. The freeze allowed the team to get on the ice as soon as they returned from the winter break while a temporary rink was built between Badin and Walsh halls. The team practiced as often as they could ahead of their opening game but clear skies turned the CMA rink into a quagmire. The ice had turned to slush and forced the two to play on the local lake. Though the conditions were marginally better, cloud cover combined with a lack of lighting forced the game to be called after just 15 minutes. Luckily, the Irish had gotten off to a fast start and their three goals were enough for the win.

Poor weather conditions persisted in the region and the team was only able to get three practice sessions in ahead of their next match. The Badin Hall rink was unsuitable for use so the team had to use St. Mary's Lake once more. Despite the adverse conditions, Notre Dame and Marquette gave the fans a tremendous show with 12 goals in the match. Much to the home crowd's delight, the Irish came out on top thanks to the program's best offensive performance in almost 4 years. Captain Timmins led of the scoring and was joined by McSorley and Stadel with each netting a pair. Many of their goals came after spectacular passes from Hicok who ended the scoring and even Boeringer was credited with goal, albeit into his own goal. Notre Dame tried several times to set up a return game with Culver but weather would not permit any of those attempts to succeed and the rematch was eventually abandoned.

After the exam break, the Irish set out on a road trip. Their first stop was at Wisconsin and the match was delayed due to soft ice. Once the rink was in a usable state the two battled on the rough surface and found it difficult to generate offense. McSorley finally broke the tie early in the second but a Wisconsin marker soon thereafter knotted the game once more. The third was played to no effect and while both teams were able to continue, the fading light forced the matched to end without overtime. Two days later the Irish were up in Minneapolis taking on the top western team. Notre Dame gave Minnesota everything they had and had a lead after a 3-goal second period. Unfortunately, the Gophers would not go quietly and, after tying the game in the third, Notre Dame needed to battle in overtime to settle the match. Minnesota was able to use its superior numbers by deploying an entirely new set of attackers. While the weren't as strong as the starters, fresh legs allowed the substitutes to quickly put Minnesota in front. After catching their breaths, the starters were swapped back in for the second overtime and extended the Gopher margin, leading to a win for the home squad. The Irish had apparently spent everything they had in the first match because the offense was entirely absent the following night.

On their way back home, Notre Dame stopped in Milwaukee for a rematch with Marquette. Neither team was able to score in the first two periods as both goaltenders were outstanding. McSorley finally broke through early in the third period and put the Irish ahead. A few minutes later, Coogan, the Blue and Gold's netminder, tried to clear the puck from the front of his cage only to see the rubber rebound off a skate and into the goal. Marquette scored late in the period but was unable to get the equalizer, giving Coogan the unfortunate distinction of scoring a game-winning goal on himself. Continue warm weather prevented any further games from being played but Notre Dame was finally able to produce a winning season.

== Roster ==
No.	Nat.	Player	Class	Pos	Height	Weight	DoB	Hometown	Previous team
	(United States)	Arthur B. Boeringer	Junior	D				Saint Paul, Minnesota
	(United States)	Robert Brennan		RW				Northampton, Massachusetts
	(United States)	Dean						Leetonia, Ohio
	(United States)	John S. Hicok	Junior	LW				Hancock, Michigan
	(United States)	Austin Holland		C				Brookline, Massachusetts
	(United States)	Charles Martin	Junior	RW				Pittsburgh, Pennsylvania
	(United States)	John McSorley		C				Pittsburgh, Pennsylvania
	(United States)	John Murphy	Junior	G				Bridgeport, Connecticut
	(United States)	Richard Smith		G				Combined Locks, Wisconsin
	(United States)	George Stadel		LW				Stamford, Connecticut
	(Canada)	Gerald Timmins (C)	Senior	D				Montreal, Quebec

== Standings ==
1925–26 Western Collegiate ice hockey standings
	Intercollegiate							Overall					
	GP	W	L	T	Pct.	GF	GA	GP	W	L	T	GF	GA
Alaska Agricultural	–	–	–	–	–	–	–	4	3	1	0	–	–
Marquette	6	0	5	1	.083	7	27	7	0	6	1	7	33
Michigan	–	–	–	–	–	–	–	10	3	5	2	16	20
Michigan College of Mines	1	0	1	0	.000	1	8	5	2	2	1	10	13
Michigan State	–	–	–	–	–	–	–	4	0	4	0	5	15
Minnesota	–	–	–	–	–	–	–	16	12	0	4	–	–
North Dakota Agricultural	–	–	–	–	–	–	–	–	–	–	–	–	–
Notre Dame	5	2	2	1	.500	14	17	6	3	2	1	17	18
USC	–	–	–	–	–	–	–	–	–	–	–	–	–
Wisconsin	–	–	–	–	–	–	–	15	8	3	4	–	–

== Schedule and results ==
Date	Opponent	Site	Result	Record
Regular Season
January 16	at Culver Military Academy*	Lake Maxinkuckee • Culver, Indiana	W 3–1	1–0–0
January 23	Marquette*	St. Mary's Lake • South Bend, Indiana	W 7–5	2–0–0
February 6	at Wisconsin*	UW Ice Rink • Madison, Wisconsin	T 1–1	2–0–1
February 8	at Minnesota*	Minneapolis Arena • Minneapolis, Minnesota	L 4–6 ^{2OT}	2–1–1
February 9	at Minnesota*	Minneapolis Arena • Minneapolis, Minnesota	L 0–4	2–2–1
February 10	at Marquette*	Hilltop Rink • Milwaukee, Wisconsin	W 2–1	3–2–1
*Non-conference game.

== Scoring statistics ==
Name	Position	Games	Goals
John McSorley	C	-	9
Gerald Timmins	D	-	3
George Stadel	LW	-	2
John Hicok	LW	-	1
Bud Boeringer	D	-	1 ^{†}
Charles Martin	RW	-	1
Robert Brennan	RW	-	0
Dean		-	0
Austin Holland	C	-	0
Hughes		-	0
Snubber Murphy	G	-	0
Richard Smith	G	-	0
Total			17 ^{†}

† Boeringer was credited with a goal for Marquette on January 23. Coogan, of Marquette, was credited with a goal for Notre Dame on February 10.
