= 1931–32 Marquette Hilltoppers men's ice hockey season =

American college hockey season

- Conference: Independent
- Home ice: Hilltop Rink

Record
- Overall: 5–4–1
- Home: 1–0–1
- Road: 3–3–0
- Neutral: 1–1–0

Coaches and captains
- Head coach: John W. Hancock
- Assistant coaches: Art Klopf
- Captain(s): Clarence Furlong; Harold McFadyen

The 1931–32 Marquette Hilltoppers men's ice hockey season was the 10th season of play for the program.

== Season ==
After a good season, Marquette was hoping to see their team return to the top of the heap but the weather had different ideas. A very mild winter left the Hilltoppers with essentially no ice prior to their first slate of games during the Christmas holiday. The team was led by Harold McFadyen and showed great improvement during their trek through Northern Michigan and Minnesota. After the team culminated their 4-game trip with a 14–2 win, they returned home, ready to continue their 22-game schedule. Unfortunately, the warm weather had not abated and Marquette was forced to remain idle for the entire month of January.

It wasn't until February that the Hilltoppers were able to play another game. The day before they were set to play, however, it was revealed that "Yank" McFadyen had earned too many credit hours and was no longer eligible to play. His role as captain was assumed by "Porky" Furlong. With their ice just barely serviceable, they welcomed Michigan Tech for a pair of games and won the series despite the layoff. Those games turned out to be the only home matches for the entire season and Marquette had to piece together the rest of their schedule on the fly. The Hilltoppers, who had built a reputation after winning two Intercollegiate titles in three years, played a game against the Poland National Team, who were gearing up for the 1932 Winter Olympics (they would place 4th of 4 teams) and performed well, losing the match 2–4. The next game for the team came on Big Cedar Lake against a local athletic club and the Hilltoppers showed that all it took was a few games to get them into shape.

The team ended its season with a pair of games against Michigan and, while the teams were essentially even in their play, the score of both games went to the Wolverines by a single goal. After the season Marquette lost its head coach, who was a football coach by trade, to Colorado Normal School. The Hilltoppers would have to contend with another new coach but the bigger concern was the lack of ice.

== Roster ==
No.	Nat.	Player	Class	Pos	Height	Weight	DoB	Hometown	Previous team
	(United States)	Sverre A. Elnes	Senior	F				Hibbing, Minnesota
	(Canada)	George L. Finkbeiner	Sophomore	F				Listowel, Ontario
	(United States)	Clarence J. Furlong (C)	Senior	F				Hibbing, Minnesota
	(Canada)	Kenneth Hood	Sophomore	F				Calgary, Alberta
	(Canada)	Harry J. McCann	Junior	F				Sydney, Nova Scotia
	(Canada)	Harold K. McFadyen (C)	Senior	D				Crossfield, Alberta
	(Canada)	William J. McIntyre	Sophomore	F				Listowel, Ontario
		Archibald Nicholson		F
	(United States)	Donald A. Olson	Sophomore	F				Duluth, Minnesota
	(United States)	Arthur Peterson		D				Duluth, Minnesota
	(Canada)	Earl J. Thompson	Sophomore	G				Caron, Saskatchewan
		Oscar Wettlaufer		F

== Standings ==
1931–32 Western Collegiate ice hockey standings
	Intercollegiate							Overall					
	GP	W	L	T	Pct.	GF	GA	GP	W	L	T	GF	GA
Marquette	5	2	2	1	.500	11	10	10	5	4	1	39	22
Michigan	8	4	3	1	.563	18	10	17	9	6	2	49	32
Michigan Tech	8	1	5	2	.250	13	36	13	5	6	2	37	47
Minnesota	9	7	1	1	.833	44	12	16	12	3	1	68	24
Minnesota–Duluth	0	0	0	0	–	0	0	7	2	5	0	11	18
North Dakota	–	–	–	–	–	–	–	1	1	0	0	–	–
St. Cloud State	6	1	5	0	.167	8	26	8	1	7	0	9	32
Wisconsin	2	0	2	0	.000	1	15	4	1	3	0	6	17

== Schedule and results ==
Date	Opponent	Site	Result	Record
Regular season
December 18	at Michigan Tech*	Calumet, Michigan ^{†}	W 4–3	1–0–0
December 21	at Duluth West Ends*	Duluth, Minnesota	L 2–3	1–1–0
December 22	at Duluth Junior College*	Duluth, Minnesota	W 3–2 ^{2OT}	2–1–0
December ?	at South Superior A.C.*	Duluth, Minnesota	W 14–2	3–1–0
February 1	Michigan Tech*	Hilltop Rink • Milwaukee, Wisconsin	W 3–1	4–1–0
February 2	Michigan Tech*	Hilltop Rink • Milwaukee, Wisconsin	T 1–1	4–1–1
February ?	vs. Poland National Team*	Chicago Stadium • Chicago, Illinois	L 2–4	4–2–1
February ?	West Bend A.C.*	Big Cedar Lake • Big Cedar Lake, Wisconsin	W 7–1	5–2–1
February 26	at Michigan*	Weinberg Coliseum • Ann Arbor, Michigan	L 0–1	5–3–1
February 27	at Michigan*	Weinberg Coliseum • Ann Arbor, Michigan	L 3–4	5–4–1
*Non-conference game.

† Michigan Tech lists the game as being played at Milwaukee.
