= 1926–27 Marquette Blue and Gold men's ice hockey season =

American college hockey season

- Conference: Independent
- Home ice: Hilltop Rink

Record
- Overall: 5–2–0

Coaches and captains
- Head coach: Kay Iverson
- Captain: Reuben Bergman

The 1926–27 Marquette Blue and Gold men's ice hockey season was the 5th season of play for the program.

== Season ==
For the fifth consecutive season, Marquette brought in a new head coach. This time the Hilltoppers were led by Kay Iverson, who had helmed the program at Wisconsin the previous two seasons. The team returned just two players from the previous year's squad and Iverson brought in a large number of new players, many of whom were freshman. While even the varsity team had a number of first-year players, three standouts were not included in this group. George McTeer, Don McFadyen and Pudge MacKenzie all grew up in the Calgary-area with the first two having won the 1926 Memorial Cup and MacKenzie on the provincial runner-up team. The "Three Macs" turned in tremendous performances early in the season, helping Marquette to a 14–0 win and then a sweep of Chicago A.C., a strong amateur club.

Marquette finished as the runner up for the Winter Frolic tournament and used an lineup made entirely of freshman in their only intercollegiate game of the season. While several of the players on the freshman team also played on varsity squad, not all were included in the varsity lineup.

Dean Van Patter served as team manager.

== Roster ==
No.	Nat.	Player	Class	Pos	Height	Weight	DoB	Hometown	Previous team
	(United States)	Reuben B. Bergman (C)	Senior	C				Milwaukee, Wisconsin
	(United States)	William F. Clancy	Sophomore					Milwaukee, Wisconsin
	(United States)	Matt J. Coogan	Senior	G				Watertown, Wisconsin
		Hegge
	(United States)	Andrew E. Jackson	Sophomore					Milwaukee, Wisconsin
	(United States)	Emil R. Kaminski	Freshman					West Allis, Wisconsin
	(United States)	John A. Kluwin	Freshman					Milwaukee, Wisconsin
	(Canada)	Clarence A. MacKenzie	Freshman	RW	5' 8" (1.73 m)	175 lb (79 kg)	1909-07-11	Cambridge, Massachusetts
	(United States)	Clifford H. McDonald	Freshman					Sault Ste. Marie, Michigan
	(Canada)	Donald P. McFadyen	Freshman	C	5' 9" (1.75 m)	163 lb (74 kg)	1907-03-24	Crossfield, Alberta
	(Canada)	George S. McTeer	Freshman	LW			1906-01-01	Quebec City, Quebec
		Pintar
		Washick

== Standings ==
1926–27 Western Collegiate ice hockey standings
	Intercollegiate							Overall					
	GP	W	L	T	Pct.	GF	GA	GP	W	L	T	GF	GA
Marquette	1	0	1	0	.000	4	7	7	5	2	0	33	18
Michigan College of Mines	6	5	1	0	.833	21	8	6	5	1	0	21	8
Michigan State	–	–	–	–	–	–	–	4	1	3	0	7	9
North Dakota Agricultural	–	–	–	–	–	–	–	–	–	–	–	–	–
Notre Dame	8	2	6	0	.250	8	29	11	3	7	1	11	34

== Schedule and results ==
Date	Opponent	Site	Result	Record
Regular season
January 11	Ke-Nash-A*	Hilltop Rink • Milwaukee, Wisconsin	W 8–0	1–0–0
January 15	Chicago A.C.*	Hilltop Rink • Milwaukee, Wisconsin	W 4–2	2–0–0
January 16	Chicago A.C.*	Gordon Park • Milwaukee, Wisconsin	W 3–2	3–0–0
January 22	at Illinois A.C.*	Oak Park Stadium • Chicago, Illinois	W 6–2	4–0–0
January 30	at Wausau A.C.*	Wausau, Wisconsin (Winter Frolic Championship)	W 6–2	5–0–0
?	Rhinelander A.C.*	Hilltop Rink • Milwaukee, Wisconsin	L 2–3	5–1–0
February 18	at Michigan College of Mines*	Houghton, Michigan	L 4–7 ^{†}	5–2–0
*Non-conference game.

† Marquette's records give a conflicting account of the score with one source claiming 4–7 and another saying 3–5. Michigan Tech lists the score as 4–7.
