= 1927–28 North Dakota Flickertails men's ice hockey season =

College ice hockey season

- Conference: Independent
- Home ice: Memorial Stadium

Record
- Overall: 0–1–3

Coaches and captains
- Head coach: Lawrence Quinn

The 1927–28 North Dakota Flickertails men's ice hockey season was the inaugural season of play for the program. The team played on a temporary rink built on the school's new football field at Memorial Stadium. The Flickertails were coached by Captain Lawrence Quinn.

== Season ==
After two years of intramural ice hockey at North Dakota, the school decided to sponsor varsity ice hockey this season. Rather than use the extant Steffanson Rink, North Dakota chose to build a temporary rink on the brand new football field. While this plan had been very successful at other schools, North Dakota was not so lucky. The rink on Memorial Stadium could not be flooded properly and would not be used again as an ice rink after this year. Despite the circumstances of their rink, the ice hockey team managed to play four games; two each against the Warren Hockey Club of Warren, Minnesota and North Dakota Agricultural. The Flickertails tied three of the matches with the other being a 1-2 loss to the Bison in the program's first intercollegiate game. Buddrick Howe scored all three of the team's goals on the season.

== Roster ==
No.	Nat.	Player	Class	Pos	Height	Weight	DoB	Hometown	Previous team
		John Adams		LW
		Donald Dryden
		Edward Forseth		D
		Robert Hallenberg
		Buddrick Howe
		Carl Lindquist		G
		Gordon Martin		RW
		Donovan Salley		C
		Wilbur Schwartz		D
		Ward Thomas
		John Wooledge

== Standings ==
1927–28 Western Collegiate ice hockey standings
	Intercollegiate							Overall					
	GP	W	L	T	Pct.	GF	GA	GP	W	L	T	GF	GA
Marquette	8	6	1	1	.813	25	12	14	12	1	1	62	23
Michigan	12	2	9	1	.208	12	27	13	2	10	1	12	31
Michigan State	4	1	3	0	.250	4	14	6	3	3	0	6	14
Michigan Tech	–	–	–	–	–	–	–	6	5	1	0	–	–
Minnesota	13	9	2	2	.769	49	15	13	9	2	2	49	15
North Dakota	2	0	1	1	.250	1	2	4	0	1	3	3	4
North Dakota Agricultural	–	–	–	–	–	–	–	–	–	–	–	–	–
Occidental	–	–	–	–	–	–	–	–	–	–	–	–	–
UCLA	5	1	4	0	.200	10	17	5	1	4	0	10	17
USC	–	–	–	–	–	–	–	–	–	–	–	–	–
Wisconsin	12	3	6	3	.375	14	27	16	5	7	4	23	32

== Schedule and results ==
Date	Opponent	Site	Result	Record
Regular Season
February ?	Warren Hockey Club*	? • ?	T 1–1 ^{2OT}	0–0–1
February 22	North Dakota Agricultural*	Memorial Stadium • Grand Forks, North Dakota	L 1–2	0–1–1
February ?	Warren Hockey Club*	? • ?	T 1–1 ^{2OT}	0–1–2
March 3	at North Dakota Agricultural*	State College Rink • Fargo, North Dakota	T 0–0	0–1–3
*Non-conference game.
