= 1926–27 California Southern Campus Grizzlies men's ice hockey season =

Intercollegiate hockey season

- Home ice: Palais de Glace

Record
- Overall: 6–0–0
- Home: 6–0–0

Coaches and captains
- Captain: Harvey Tafe

The 1926–27 California Southern Campus Grizzlies men's ice hockey season was the inaugural season of the program which became known as UCLA Bruins men's ice hockey the following year.

== Season ==
The California Southern Campus joined the ranks college hockey programs, founding their program in a sport that had only been in the state for two years. With their team so new, the Grizzlies were only able to schedule six games with two opponents. Southern Campus performed well in the games, winning all despite the score being close in most. Foran scored the first goal in program history. California Southern Campus were to play USC on March 11 in an unofficial match, but the game was called off due to Southern California's policy against playing CSC. Instead the team played the Palais de Glace club team and lost 4–2. Near the end of their season, the team was formally recognized by the Athletic and Student university councils and officially made a minor sport for the school.

No coach was listed for the team. Artemus Lane served as team manager. The California Southern Campus, later known as UCLA, used the same colors as University of California, Berkeley until 1949.

== Roster ==
No.	Nat.	Player	Class	Pos	Height	Weight	DoB	Hometown	Previous team
		Burke		F
	(United States)	Adam E. Diehl	Senior	G				Los Angeles, California
		Red Dutton		G
		Foran		F
		Kenneth Frogley		F
	(Canada)	Douglas F. Hamlin	Junior	F				Moose Jaw, Saskatchewan
	(United States)	Paul H. Mitchem	Junior	D				Spokane, Washington
	(United States)	Rollin E. Staples	Freshman					Los Angeles, California
	(United States)	Harvey C. Tafe (C)	Junior	D				Cleveland, Ohio
		Ben T. Trump	Freshman
		Everett Wendell	Sophomore	F
		Donald Wentzell		F

== Standings ==
1926–27 Western Collegiate ice hockey standings
	Intercollegiate							Overall					
	GP	W	L	T	Pct.	GF	GA	GP	W	L	T	GF	GA
Marquette	1	0	1	0	.000	4	7	7	5	2	0	33	18
Michigan College of Mines	6	5	1	0	.833	21	8	6	5	1	0	21	8
Michigan State	–	–	–	–	–	–	–	4	1	3	0	7	9
North Dakota Agricultural	–	–	–	–	–	–	–	–	–	–	–	–	–
Notre Dame	8	2	6	0	.250	8	29	11	3	7	1	11	34

== Schedule and results ==
Date	Opponent	Site	Result	Record
Regular season
February 25	vs. Southwestern*	Palais de Glace • Los Angeles, California	W 2–1 ^{OT}	1–0–0
March 4	vs. Occidental*	Palais de Glace • Los Angeles, California	W 3–2	2–0–0
March 11	vs. Palais de Glace Club Team*	Palais de Glace • Los Angeles, California (Exhibition)	L 2–4	
March 18	vs. Southwestern*	Palais de Glace • Los Angeles, California	W 3–1	3–0–0
March 25	vs. Occidental*	Palais de Glace • Los Angeles, California	W 6–1	4–0–0
April 1	vs. Southwestern*	Palais de Glace • Los Angeles, California	W 3–1	5–0–0
April 8	vs. Occidental*	Palais de Glace • Los Angeles, California	W 2–1	6–0–0
*Non-conference game.
