= 1928–29 UCLA Bruins men's ice hockey season =

Intercollegiate hockey season

- Home ice: Palais de Glace

Record
- Overall: 0–3–0
- Road: 0–3–0

Coaches and captains
- Head coach: Harvey Tafe
- Captain: Clarence Scott

The 1928–29 UCLA Bruins men's ice hockey season was the 3rd season of play for the program.

== Season ==
Entering the season, UCLA joined several other schools in the Pacific Coast Conference, though ice hockey was not yet sponsored by the conference. They were also joined on the ice by two other California programs (California and Loyola) for their first official seasons. UCLA, however did have to content with several problems throughout the season. The first issue was a lack of a head coach for the team. Former team captain Harvey Tafe was brought in to keep the team afloat. The Bruins also had to scramble to find a place to practice and were only able to schedule three games on the year. The team didn't even meet until February 25 but, by the time they did, the program had been rescued from the abyss. The reason the team was so late in starting was that the school's administration had decided to discontinue the program after the second season but a later meeting approved its renewal for the spring semester.

After some wrangling, the team scheduled three games against USC with the first coming on March 12. Unsurprisingly, with the Trojans having been together for far longer than the Bruins, UCLA lost a lopsided affair to begin their season. Afterwards, UCLA played far better against Southern California. The return of Chester Englund between the pipes helped keep their final two games within one goal, though they lost both. Jacobs served as team manager. Until 1949, UCLA used the same colors as University of California, Berkeley.

== Roster ==
| No. | Nat. | Player | Class | Pos | Height | Weight | DoB | Hometown | Previous team |
|---|---|---|---|---|---|---|---|---|---|
| | | Donald Clow | | LW |
| | | Chester Englund | Senior | G |
| | | John Ford | Sophomore |
| | | R. Guhl |
| | (United States) | Alwin W. Johnson | Senior | D | | | | Minneapolis, Minnesota |
| | | G. Johnson | | RW |
| | | A. Jonsson |
| | (United States) | William F. Keefe | Sophomore | G | | | | Inglewood, California |
| | | Piasek | | D |
| | (United States) | Carl P. Schlicke | Sophomore | | | | | Los Angeles, California |
| | (United States) | Clarence L. Scott (C) | Sophomore | C | | | | Los Angeles, California |
| | (United States) | Rollin E. Staples | Junior | | | | | Los Angeles, California |

== Standings ==
1928–29 Western Collegiate ice hockey standings
| | Intercollegiate | | | | | | | Overall | | | | | |
| | GP | W | L | T | Pct. | GF | GA | GP | W | L | T | GF | GA |
|---|---|---|---|---|---|---|---|---|---|---|---|---|---|
| California | – | – | – | – | – | – | – | – | – | – | – | – | – |
| Loyola | – | – | – | – | – | – | – | – | – | – | – | – | – |
| Marquette | 11 | 7 | 4 | 0 | .636 | 70 | 17 | 14 | 9 | 5 | 0 | 85 | 20 |
| Michigan | 14 | 4 | 9 | 1 | .321 | 34 | 65 | 17 | 5 | 11 | 1 | 46 | 74 |
| Michigan State | 2 | 0 | 2 | 0 | .000 | 3 | 17 | 7 | 3 | 3 | 1 | 23 | 19 |
| Michigan Tech | 8 | 1 | 4 | 3 | .313 | 13 | 18 | 13 | 2 | 8 | 3 | 16 | 35 |
| Minnesota | 15 | 13 | 2 | 0 | .867 | 57 | 12 | 17 | 14 | 2 | 1 | 62 | 13 |
| North Dakota Agricultural | – | – | – | – | – | – | – | – | – | – | – | – | – |
| Wisconsin | 13 | 5 | 6 | 2 | .462 | 24 | 33 | 20 | 11 | 7 | 2 | 42 | 39 |
| UCLA | 3 | 0 | 3 | 0 | .000 | 5 | 14 | 3 | 0 | 3 | 0 | 5 | 14 |
| USC | – | – | – | – | – | – | – | – | – | – | – | – | – |

== Schedule and results ==
| Date | Opponent | Site | Result | Record |
Regular Season
| March 12 | vs. USC* | Palais de Glace • Los Angeles, California | L 2–9 | 0–1–0 |
| March 19 | vs. USC* | Palais de Glace • Los Angeles, California | L 1–2 | 0–2–0 |
| March 23 | vs. USC* | Palais de Glace • Los Angeles, California | L 2–3 | 0–3–0 |
*Non-conference game.
