= 1927–28 UCLA Grizzlies men's ice hockey season =

Intercollegiate hockey season

- Home ice: Palais de Glace

Record
- Overall: 1–4–0
- Neutral: 1–4–0

Coaches and captains
- Head coach: Frampton
- Captain: Harvey Tafe

The 1927–28 UCLA Grizzlies men's ice hockey season was the second season of the program and the first season in which the team was known as UCLA. In the team's inaugural 1926–27 season, the school was known as California Southern Campus.

== Season ==
Fresh off of their first official season, and an undefeated one no less, UCLA was slated to play their first game against USC. The game was delayed, however, and the team played a familiar opponent to begin their season, Occidental. The team lost its first game in two years and followed that up with a second consecutive defeat, putting them in a poor position right at the start. With so few games on their schedule, UCLA couldn't afford to lose any more and the team recovered with a hard fought win in game 3. The two early losses, and USC's dominance over Occidental, meant that UCLA could only hope for a tie with the Trojans for the crown but that could only happen if the Grizzlies won each of their remaining 3 games.

In the pivotal game with Southern California, the Trojans got out to a 2-goal lead but UCLA was able to tie the game and make it look like they had a chance for a time. Unfortunately the attack from USC was to strong and the Grizzlies surrendered 6 goals, handing the city championship over to the Trojans. After a second loss to Occidental, the team's lineup was changed with Tafe dropping back to defense (where he had played the year before) and Al Johnson jumping up to the forward position. The game was delayed when USC got the date wrong and didn't show up to the game. The Grizzlies could have claimed a win on a forfeit but the team refused to do so. It was rescheduled for a week later but eventually cancelled.

Artemus Lane served as team manager. UCLA used the same colors as University of California Berkeley until 1949.

== Roster ==
No.	Nat.	Player	Class	Pos	Height	Weight	DoB	Hometown	Previous team
		Chester Englund	Junior	G
		John Ford	Freshman	D
	(United States)	Alwin W. Johnson	Junior	F/D				Minneapolis, Minnesota
		G. Johnson		F
		Kenneth Frogley		F
	(United States)	Clarence L. Scott	Freshman	C				Los Angeles, California
	(United States)	Harvey C. Tafe (C)	Senior	F/D				Cleveland, Ohio
		Everett Wendell	Junior	D
		Donald Wentzell		D
		Young		D

== Standings ==
1927–28 Western Collegiate ice hockey standings
	Intercollegiate							Overall					
	GP	W	L	T	Pct.	GF	GA	GP	W	L	T	GF	GA
Marquette	8	6	1	1	.813	25	12	14	12	1	1	62	23
Michigan	12	2	9	1	.208	12	27	13	2	10	1	12	31
Michigan State	4	1	3	0	.250	4	14	6	3	3	0	6	14
Michigan Tech	–	–	–	–	–	–	–	6	5	1	0	–	–
Minnesota	13	9	2	2	.769	49	15	13	9	2	2	49	15
North Dakota Agricultural	–	–	–	–	–	–	–	–	–	–	–	–	–
Occidental	–	–	–	–	–	–	–	–	–	–	–	–	–
UCLA	5	1	4	0	.200	10	17	5	1	4	0	10	17
USC	–	–	–	–	–	–	–	–	–	–	–	–	–
Wisconsin	12	3	6	3	.375	14	27	16	5	7	4	23	32

== Schedule and results ==
Date	Opponent	Site	Result	Record
Regular Season
?	vs. Southwestern*	Big Bear Lake • Big Bear Lake, California (Exhibition)	W 8–0	
March 10	vs. Occidental*	Palais de Glace • Los Angeles, California	L 3–4	0–1–0
March 17	vs. USC*	Palais de Glace • Los Angeles, California	L 0–2	0–2–0
March 21	vs. Occidental*	Palais de Glace • Los Angeles, California	W 3–2	1–2–0
March ?	vs. Palais de Glace Club Team*	Palais de Glace • Los Angeles, California (Exhibition)	W 6–5	
April 1	vs. USC*	Palais de Glace • Los Angeles, California	L 3–6	1–3–0
April 4	vs. Occidental*	Palais de Glace • Los Angeles, California	L 1–3	1–4–0
*Non-conference game.
