= 1925–26 Marquette Blue and Gold men's ice hockey season =

American college hockey season

- Conference: Independent
- Home ice: Hilltop Rink

Record
- Overall: 0–6–1
- Home: 0–2–1
- Road: 0–4–0

Coaches and captains
- Head coach: Art Schinner
- Captain: Gordon Thomas

The 1925–26 Marquette Blue and Gold men's ice hockey season was the 4th season of play for the program.

== Season ==
Marquette team continued to suffer from the effects of warm weather and were unable to practice much throughout the season. When the team opened the season against Wisconsin, the Badgers challenged Gordon Thomas's eligibility, saying that he had already played three years of varsity. The captain was able to get in the second game, strengthening the team, but it didn't change the outcome and Marquette was swept in their opening weekend.

The team played their first home game in nearly two years when they took on defending western champion Minnesota. The Blue and Gold demonstrated a great deal of improvement with a 0–0 tie I the first game. The Gophers couldn't be contained, however, and ended up winning the next game 4–1 with captain Thomas scoring Marquette's first goal of the season. The Blue and Gold were finally able to get a decent number of goals in the game against Notre Dame but, as the rest of their season went, the team still couldn't win a game.

An additional difficulty the team had was the lack of a full-time coach. Art Schinner provided some guidance, but the team was mostly run by the players themselves. With only two returning for the following season, the team had its work cut out for it.

Ted Wedemeyer served as team manager with Edward Barrett as an assistant.

== Roster ==
No.	Nat.	Player	Class	Pos	Height	Weight	DoB	Hometown	Previous team
	(United States)	Reuben B. Bergman	Junior	C				Milwaukee, Wisconsin
	(United States)	Matt J. Coogan	Junior	G				Watertown, Wisconsin
	(United States)	William J. Conness	Senior	D				Superior, Wisconsin
	(United States)	Gordon J. Corcoran	Senior	D				Escanaba, Michigan
	(United States)	Arthur L. La Belle	Senior	LW				Chicago, Illinois
	(United States)	Gorden E. Thomas (C)	Senior	RW				Virginia, Minnesota
	(United States)	A. M. Tocci	Senior					Superior, Wisconsin

== Standings ==
1925–26 Western Collegiate ice hockey standings
	Intercollegiate							Overall					
	GP	W	L	T	Pct.	GF	GA	GP	W	L	T	GF	GA
Alaska Agricultural	–	–	–	–	–	–	–	4	3	1	0	–	–
Marquette	6	0	5	1	.083	7	27	7	0	6	1	7	33
Michigan	–	–	–	–	–	–	–	10	3	5	2	16	20
Michigan College of Mines	1	0	1	0	.000	1	8	5	2	2	1	10	13
Michigan State	–	–	–	–	–	–	–	4	0	4	0	5	15
Minnesota	–	–	–	–	–	–	–	16	12	0	4	–	–
North Dakota Agricultural	–	–	–	–	–	–	–	–	–	–	–	–	–
Notre Dame	5	2	2	1	.500	14	17	6	3	2	1	17	18
USC	–	–	–	–	–	–	–	–	–	–	–	–	–
Wisconsin	–	–	–	–	–	–	–	15	8	3	4	–	–

== Schedule and results ==
Date	Opponent	Site	Result	Record
Regular season
January 8	at Wisconsin*	UW Ice Rink • Madison, Wisconsin	L 0–11	0–1–0
January 9	at Wisconsin*	UW Ice Rink • Madison, Wisconsin	L 0–3	0–2–0
January 18	Minnesota*	Hilltop Rink • Milwaukee, Wisconsin	T 0–0	0–2–1
January 19	Minnesota*	Gordon Park Rink • Milwaukee, Wisconsin	L 1–4	0–3–1
January 23 ^{†}	at Notre Dame*	Saint Mary's Lake • South Bend, Indiana	L 5–7	0–4–1
January 29 ^{†}	at Milwaukee A.C.*	East Side Rink • Milwaukee, Wisconsin	L 0–6	0–5–1
February 10 ^{†}	Notre Dame*	Hilltop Rink • Milwaukee, Wisconsin	L 1–2	0–6–1
*Non-conference game.

† Marquette record indicate the final three games of their season happened in late-March, early-April, however, Notre Dame's records indicate otherwise. Due to the reported warm winter, it's likely that Notre Dame's archive is accurate.
