= 1926–27 Notre Dame Fighting Irish men's ice hockey season =

- Conference: Independent
- Home ice: St. Mary's Lake

Record
- Overall: 3–7–1
- Home: 0–1–0
- Road: 3–4–1
- Neutral: 0–2–0

Coaches and captains
- Head coach: Benjamin Dubois
- Captain: John Hicok

The 1926–27 Notre Dame Fighting Irish men's ice hockey season was the 10th season of play for the program. The team was coached by Benjamin Dubois in his 1st season.

== Season ==
Before the season began, Notre Dame had to contend with the loss of their coach. Tom Lieb had taken at Wisconsin and was replaced by Benjamin Dubois. With the team having been hamstrung in each of the previous three seasons due to poor weather conditions, the club arranged a large number of away games and began far earlier than they had before.

The first match for the Irish came before Christmas and saw then face an amateur squad from Chicago. A lack of practice and several new faces caused the team to lose but they did not look out of place on the ice. Notre Dame had better results after the winter break when they headed east and played two more amateur clubs. The games showed improving results with the Irish earning a tie then a win as they headed into the long-awaited showdown with the Ivy League powerhouses. Against Harvard, the Irish were completely outmatched. Snub Murphy stopped 65 shots in the game but the final score was still a 0–7 drubbing from the Crimson. The following night, Notre Dame was at the new Madison Square Garden and only played marginally better against Yale.

The team returned home after the decisive defeats and tried to fix their issues before the match with Michigan State. Against an inferior opponent, Notre Dame was able to get its first intercollegiate win of the year. The Irish were in command for most of the game and gave faint hope that he early-season struggles had been resolved. The next match was Notre Dame's first (and last) home game of the season and saw a solid Michigan College of Mines team in South Bend for the first time. The Huskies got the jump on the Irish and scored twice in the first. After adding a third at the start of the second period, the Notre Dame defense firmed up and stopped all further attempts. However, the offense never got on track and finished the game without a single goal.

Poor weather forced a game with Marquette to be cancelled and the Irish didn't get back onto the ice until they headed north on their second road trip. The first stop was in the Upper Peninsula and a pair of games against MCM. The Huskies blanked Notre Dame for a second time in the first match, winning 0–4. The third game between the two saw Notre Dame finally get onto the scoresheet but they had to abandon their stingy defense to do so and ended up losing 3–6. With no hope of a western championship, the team headed west to Minneapolis to face the vaunted Minnesota Gophers. While the first game went to form, with the Irish being shutout for the sixth time that season, the seniors responded brilliantly in the rematch. Pinky Martin opened the scoring with his final collegiate goal while Bud Boeringer and Murphy combined to stymie the Gophers. Murphy made 39 saves to earn a stunning win while captain Hicok ended the season with a goal just before the final buzzer.

Unfortunately for Notre Dame, this season confirmed their worst fears. Even when the school was willing to invest more money and send the team on long sojourns, it wasn't enough. The lack of an enclosed and/or artificial rink meant that the team was completely at the mercy of the elements. Over a four-year span, the team had played just 4 games at home and that was hardly enough to capture the interest of the student body. With no arena prospects on the horizon, the program was shuttered and would not resurface for more than 40 years.

== Roster ==
No.	Nat.	Player	Class	Pos	Height	Weight	DoB	Hometown	Previous team
	(United States)	Arthur B. Boeringer	Senior	D				Saint Paul, Minnesota
	(United States)	Robert Brennan		RW				Northampton, Massachusetts
	(United States)	William Conway		D				Minneapolis, Minnesota
	(United States)	J. Francis Driscoll		G				Brookline, Massachusetts
	(United States)	John S. Hicok (C)	Senior	LW				Hancock, Michigan
	(United States)	Austin Holland		C				Brookline, Massachusetts
	(United States)	Frank Holland		D				Brookline, Massachusetts
	(United States)	Charles Martin	Senior	RW				Pittsburgh, Pennsylvania
	(United States)	John McGrath		D				Cleveland, Ohio
	(United States)	John McSorley		C				Pittsburgh, Pennsylvania
	(United States)	John Moloy		D				Bridgeport, Connecticut
	(United States)	John Murphy	Senior	G				Bridgeport, Connecticut
	(United States)	Louis Niezer		D				Fort Wayne, Indiana
	(United States)	George Stadel		LW				Stamford, Connecticut

== Standings ==
1926–27 Western Collegiate ice hockey standings
	Intercollegiate							Overall					
	GP	W	L	T	Pct.	GF	GA	GP	W	L	T	GF	GA
Marquette	1	0	1	0	.000	4	7	7	5	2	0	33	18
Michigan College of Mines	6	5	1	0	.833	21	8	6	5	1	0	21	8
Michigan State	–	–	–	–	–	–	–	4	1	3	0	7	9
North Dakota Agricultural	–	–	–	–	–	–	–	–	–	–	–	–	–
Notre Dame	8	2	6	0	.250	8	29	11	3	7	1	11	34

== Schedule and results ==
Date	Opponent	Site	Result	Record
Regular Season
December 20	at Chicago Athletic Association*	Chicago Coliseum • Chicago, Illinois	L 0–3	0–1–0
January 3	at Pittsburgh Hockey Club*	Duquesne Garden • Pittsburgh, Pennsylvania	T 1–1 ^{OT}	0–1–1
January 4	at Nichols Hockey Club*	Nichols Rink • Buffalo, New York	W 2–1	1–1–1
January 7	at Harvard*	Boston Arena • Boston, Massachusetts	L 0–7	1–2–1
January 8	vs. Yale*	Madison Square Garden • Manhattan, New York	L 0–5	1–3–1
January 15	at Michigan State*	Grand River Avenue Rink • Lansing, Michigan	W 3–1	2–3–1
January 22	Michigan College of Mines*	St. Mary's Lake • South Bend, Indiana	L 0–3	2–4–1
February 4	vs. Michigan College of Mines*	Calumet Colosseum • Calumet, Michigan	L 0–4	2–5–1
February 5	at Michigan College of Mines*	Mohawk Glacidome • Houghton, Michigan	L 3–6	2–6–1
February 7	at Minnesota*	Minneapolis Arena • Minneapolis, Minnesota	L 0–3	2–7–1
February 8	at Minnesota*	Minneapolis Arena • Minneapolis, Minnesota	W 2–0	3–7–1
*Non-conference game.
