= 1925–26 Michigan College of Mines Huskies men's ice hockey season =

- Conference: Independent

Record
- Overall: 2–2–1

Coaches and captains
- Head coach: Leon Harvey
- Captain: John Meyers

The 1925–26 Michigan College of Mines Huskies men's ice hockey season was the 7th season of play for the program. The Huskies were coached by Leon Harvey in his 2nd season.

== Season ==
Though the team ended the year without having to find a new head coach for the first time, the Huskies were still finding it difficult to play matches against fellow colleges. The program was able to get in a game with St. Thomas at the end of January, but that was their only intercollegiate match of the year. To make matters worse the club was barely even competitive against the Tommies, though with the Minnesotans finishing 10–1 for the year. However, the Miners did show some improvement afterwards, winning their final two games to get back to .500.

== Roster ==
No.	Nat.	Player	Class	Pos	Height	Weight	DoB	Hometown	Previous team
		John Meyers (C)

== Standings ==
1925–26 Western Collegiate ice hockey standings
	Intercollegiate							Overall					
	GP	W	L	T	Pct.	GF	GA	GP	W	L	T	GF	GA
Alaska Agricultural	–	–	–	–	–	–	–	4	3	1	0	–	–
Marquette	6	0	5	1	.083	7	27	7	0	6	1	7	33
Michigan	–	–	–	–	–	–	–	10	3	5	2	16	20
Michigan College of Mines	1	0	1	0	.000	1	8	5	2	2	1	10	13
Michigan State	–	–	–	–	–	–	–	4	0	4	0	5	15
Minnesota	–	–	–	–	–	–	–	16	12	0	4	–	–
North Dakota Agricultural	–	–	–	–	–	–	–	–	–	–	–	–	–
Notre Dame	5	2	2	1	.500	14	17	6	3	2	1	17	18
USC	–	–	–	–	–	–	–	–	–	–	–	–	–
Wisconsin	–	–	–	–	–	–	–	15	8	3	4	–	–

== Schedule and results ==
Date	Opponent	Site	Result	Record
Regular Season
January 8	Radio Six*	?	T 1–1	0–0–1
January 14	Radio Six*	?	L 1–2	0–1–1
January 22	St. Thomas*	?	L 1–8	0–2–1
February 8	Radio Six*	?	W 4–1	1–2–1
February 10	Hancock Alumni*	?	W 3–1	2–2–1
*Non-conference game.
