= John W. Hancock =

American football player, track and field athlete, coach and athletics administrator

Biographical details
- Born: April 13, 1901; Marshfield, Wisconsin, U.S.
- Died: 1993

Playing career

Football
- 1922–1924: Iowa
- Positions: Tackle, end

Coaching career (HC unless noted)

Football
- 1925–1926: Colorado Teachers (assistant)
- 1927–1929: Mississippi A&M
- 1930–1931: Marquette (assistant)
- 1932–1953: Colorado Teachers / Colorado State–Greeley

Ice hockey
- 1930–1932: Marquette

Basketball
- 1943–1945: Colorado State–Greeley

Administrative career (AD unless noted)
- 1932–1966: Colorado Teachers / Colorado State–Greeley

Head coaching record
- Overall: 83–90–9 (football); 1–25 (basketball)
- Bowls: 0–1

Accomplishments and honors

Championships
- Football; 2 RMC (1934, 1948)

Awards
- First-team All-Big Ten (1924)

John W. Hancock (April 13, 1901 – 1993) was an American football player, track and field athlete, coach of football, basketball, track, and wrestling, and college athletics administrator. He played college football at the University of Iowa.

== Playing career ==
Hancock played football at the University of Iowa from 1922 to 1924. He played a significant role on Iowa's 1922 Big Ten Conference championship team. As a senior, Hancock played both the tackle and end positions and kicked five field goals for the Hawkeyes. He was named all-Big Ten and a second team All-American after the 1924 season. He also won three letters in track with the Hawkeyes, capturing a title in the discus event at the 1925 Big Ten championships.

== Coaching career ==
Hancock went into college coaching after graduation. He coached football at Mississippi State University for three years from 1927 to 1929. While working as an assistant at Marquette University, Hancock served as head coach of the ice hockey team for two seasons. He went to the University of Northern Colorado in 1932 and began a long coaching career. Hancock served as their athletic director for 34 years and coached football and track for decades as well.

Hancock was the head football coach at Northern Colorado for 20 seasons, from 1932 until 1953. His football coaching record at Northern Colorado was 75–78–5. In 1950, he led his team to the Bean Bowl.

Hancock is best known as a college wrestling coach at Northern Colorado. He originated the Mountain Intercollegiate Wrestling Association and proceeded to lead UNC to 30 consecutive conference championships. He served on the NCAA rules committee for 16 years and chaired it in 1962–63.

Hancock has been nicknamed “the father of Colorado high school wrestling”. He helped start the Colorado High School Wrestling Tournament in Greeley in 1936 by going door-to-door in the community to find families that could house the visiting high school wrestlers. Two of his sons became well-known wrestling coaches as well.

== Honors ==
Hancock was inducted into the National Wrestling Hall of Fame in 1998. The Butler–Hancock Sports Pavilion at the University of Northern Colorado was named in honor of Hancock and Pete Butler, baseball coach.

== Head coaching record ==
=== Football ===
Year	Team	Overall	Conference	Standing	Bowl/playoffs
Mississippi A&M Aggies (Southern Conference) (1927–1929)
1927	Mississippi A&M	5–3	2–3	T–2nd	
1928	Mississippi A&M	2–4–2	1–4	18th	
1929	Mississippi A&M	1–5–2	0–3–1	20th	
Mississippi A&M:		8–12–4	3–10–1		
Colorado Teachers / Colorado State–Greeley Bears (Rocky Mountain Conference) (1932–1953)
1932	Colorado Teachers	4–2–1	2–2–1	T–6th	
1933	Colorado Teachers	4–3	3–3	7th	
1934	Colorado Teachers	6–1	6–1	T–1st	
1935	Colorado State–Greeley	4–3	2–1	T–5th	
1936	Colorado State–Greeley	5–4	4–3	5th	
1937	Colorado State–Greeley	2–6	2–4	T–7th	
1938	Colorado State–Greeley	3–4–1	1–1–1	T–3rd	
1939	Colorado State–Greeley	4–4	3–1	2nd	
1940	Colorado State–Greeley	2–5–1	1–3	4th	
1941	Colorado State–Greeley	3–5	3–1	2nd	
1942	Colorado State–Greeley	4–5	1–1	2nd	
1943	No team—World War II				
1944	No team—World War II				
1945	Colorado State–Greeley	4–3			
1946	Colorado State–Greeley	6–3	3–1	2nd	
1947	Colorado State–Greeley	4–4–1	2–1–1	3rd	
1948	Colorado State–Greeley	4–4	3–0	1st	
1949	Colorado State–Greeley	0–8	0–3	4th	
1950	Colorado State–Greeley	5–3–1	3–2	T–2nd	L Bean
1951	Colorado State–Greeley	4–3	2–3	T–4th	
1952	Colorado State–Greeley	5–3	3–2	3rd	
1953	Colorado State–Greeley	2–5	0–5	6th	
Colorado Teachers / Colorado State–Greeley:		75–78–5	44–38–3		
Total:		83–90–9			
National championship Conference title Conference division title or championship game berth

=== Ice hockey ===
Record table
Season	Team	Overall	Conference	Standing	Postseason
Marquette Hilltoppers Independent (1930–1932)
1930–31	Marquette	8–5–1			
1931–32	Marquette	5–4–1			
Total:		13–9–2			
