= Steffanson Rink =

Ice rink in Grand Forks, North Dakota

- Steffanson Rink in 1927
- Location: Grand Forks, ND 58202
- Owner: University of North Dakota
- Operator: University of North Dakota

Construction
- Opened: 1925 (100–101 years ago)
- Closed: 1946 (79–80 years ago)

Tenant
- North Dakota ice hockey (1929–1936)

Steffanson Rink was a seasonal, outdoor ice rink on the campus of the University of North Dakota in Grand Forks, North Dakota. The venue served as the original home of the school's ice hockey team. However, it was prone to extended periods of disuse as a result of weather conditions and was the primary cause for the instability of the team for its first decade of existence.

== History ==
In 1925, The University of North Dakota arranged for a temporary rink to be built on campus so that the students would have a nearby place to skate. The rudimentary rink was equipped with boards and two nets but little else. It was named after Vilhjalmur Stefansson, an alumnus of the school who had risen to prominence as an arctic explorer. In its first year of use, the rink was used by students as the home rink for a campus league. After two years, the sport had become so popular that the school agreed to sponsor ice hockey as a minor varsity sport in 1927.

North Dakota's varsity team hit the ice for the first time in January of 1928. However, in order to support the new program, a second seasonal rink was built atop the school's brand new football field, Memorial Stadium. The plan did not work well and the team was only able to play an abbreviated schedule of four games in its inaugural season. The following year, the entire season had to be scrapped due to issues with the rink, leading the team to abandon using the football field in the future. In 1929, North Dakota's hockey team switched to using the Steffanson Rink and played two seasons before an overly warm winter in 1932 caused a second season to be lost due to a lack of ice. After returning for the 1932–33 season, the program was forced to suspend once more due to a lack of ice. The team returned in 1936 but by then the shine had worn off the program. North Dakota administrators wanted their school to have a hockey program but had grown weary of spending money during the great depression on the team only to see their efforts ruined by the weather. After the season, the team was mothballed until circumstances improved. The rink remained in use for the student body until the Winter Sports Building was converted into a full-time ice hockey rink in the 1940s and Steffanson Rink was no longer needed.
