= Minneapolis Millers (disambiguation) =

The Minneapolis Millers were a minor league baseball team from 1884 to 1960.

Minneapolis Millers could also be:

- Minneapolis Millers (AHA) a minor league ice hockey team from 1925 to 1950
- Minneapolis Millers (IHL) a minor league ice hockey team from 1959 to 1963
- Minneapolis Millers (Great Central League) an independent baseball team in 1994

== See also ==
- Minneapolis Millerettes women baseball team 1944.
