= Tropical Ice Gardens =

Outdoor, artificial ice rink

- Sonja Henie Ice Palace
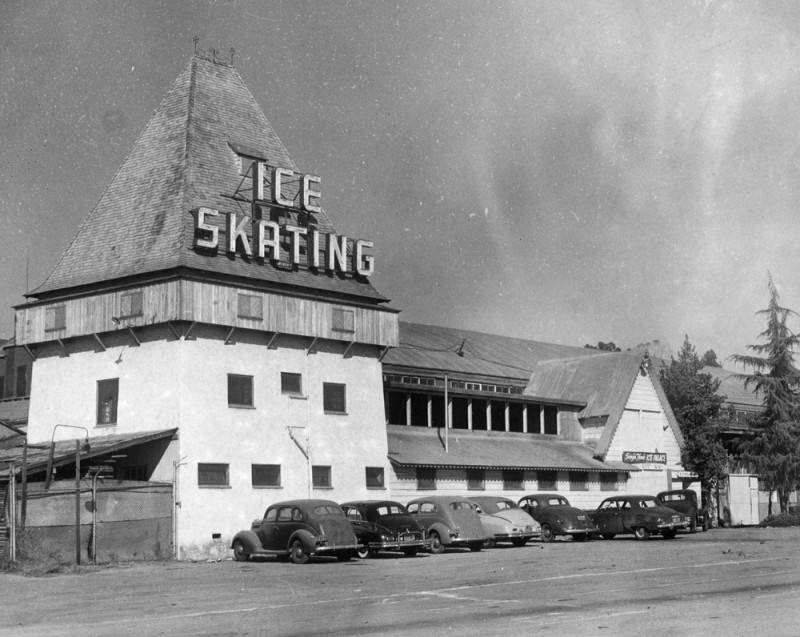
- Tropical Ice Gardens, 1949
- Interactive map of Tropical Ice Gardens
- Location: 1000 Westwood Blvd; Los Angeles, California, 90024
- Coordinates: 34°03′45″N 118°26′43″W
- Capacity: 12,000
- Surface: 210 x 100 ft.

Construction
- Opened: November 28, 1938
- Closed: 1949
- Demolished: May 5, 1950 (collapse)

Tenants
- UCLA Bruins men's ice hockey (1938–1941); USC Trojans men's ice hockey (1938–1942)

The Tropical Ice Gardens (Ice Palace) in Los Angeles, California was an outdoor artificial ice rink. In its short life, the Ice Gardens served as home to several ice hockey teams as well Sonja Henie's ice show.

== History ==
Opened in November 1938, the Tropical Ice Gardens was the first open-air artificial rink in Los Angeles and was designed for sizable crowds to enjoy ice hockey, ice dancing and figure skating shows. Designed to be operated year-round, the building struck a distinct figure in the area; it was designed to be a replica of an alpine village but was surrounded by palm trees. A few years after opening, the venue was purchased by Sonja Henie and unofficially became known as the 'Sonja Henie Ice Palace'. The Ice Gardens were built adjacent to the UCLA campus and became the home of the Bruins ice hockey team upon opening.

The venue saw reduced use during World War II but problems with an outdoor rink in southern California became unavoidable afterwards. UCLA decided against restarting its ice hockey team (mostly as a cost-cutting measure), and Henie spent most of her time touring the country. UCLA purchased the site and closed it in 1949. While the venue was slated for demolition to make room for a campus expansion, the building was damaged by fire in 1950 and collapsed.
