= 1929–30 United States collegiate men's ice hockey season =

- Duration: December 1929– March 1930
- East Collegiate champion: Yale / Harvard
- West Collegiate champion: Marquette

The 1929–30 United States collegiate men's ice hockey season was the 36th season of collegiate ice hockey in the United States.

== Regular season ==
=== Standings ===
1929–30 Eastern Collegiate ice hockey standings
	Intercollegiate							Overall					
	GP	W	L	T	Pct.	GF	GA	GP	W	L	T	GF	GA
Amherst	9	2	7	0	.222	12	30	9	2	7	0	12	30
Army	10	6	2	2	.700	28	18	11	6	3	2	31	23
Bates	11	6	4	1	.591	28	21	11	6	4	1	28	21
Boston University	10	4	5	1	.450	34	31	13	4	8	1	40	48
Bowdoin	9	2	7	0	.222	12	29	9	2	7	0	12	29
Brown	–	–	–	–	–	–	–	12	8	3	1	–	–
Clarkson	6	4	2	0	.667	50	11	10	8	2	0	70	18
Colby	7	4	2	1	.643	19	15	7	4	2	1	19	15
Colgate	6	1	4	1	.250	9	19	6	1	4	1	9	19
Connecticut Agricultural	–	–	–	–	–	–	–	–	–	–	–	–	–
Cornell	6	4	2	0	.667	29	18	6	4	2	0	29	18
Dartmouth	–	–	–	–	–	–	–	13	5	8	0	44	54
Hamilton	–	–	–	–	–	–	–	8	4	4	0	–	–
Harvard	10	7	2	1	.750	44	14	12	7	4	1	48	23
Massachusetts Agricultural	11	7	4	0	.636	25	25	11	7	4	0	25	25
Middlebury	8	6	2	0	.750	26	13	8	6	2	0	26	13
MIT	8	4	4	0	.500	16	27	8	4	4	0	16	27
New Hampshire	11	3	6	2	.364	20	30	13	3	8	2	22	42
Northeastern	–	–	–	–	–	–	–	7	2	5	0	–	–
Norwich	–	–	–	–	–	–	–	6	0	4	2	–	–
Pennsylvania	10	4	6	0	.400	36	39	11	4	7	0	40	49
Princeton	–	–	–	–	–	–	–	18	9	8	1	–	–
Rensselaer	–	–	–	–	–	–	–	3	1	2	0	–	–
St. John's	–	–	–	–	–	–	–	–	–	–	–	–	–
St. Lawrence	–	–	–	–	–	–	–	4	0	4	0	–	–
St. Stephen's	–	–	–	–	–	–	–	–	–	–	–	–	–
Union	5	2	2	1	.500	8	18	5	2	2	1	8	18
Vermont	–	–	–	–	–	–	–	–	–	–	–	–	–
Villanova	1	0	1	0	.000	3	7	4	0	3	1	13	22
Williams	9	4	4	1	.500	28	32	9	4	4	1	28	32
Yale	14	12	1	1	.893	80	21	19	17	1	1	110	28

1929–30 Midwest Collegiate ice hockey standings
	Intercollegiate							Overall					
	GP	W	L	T	Pct.	GF	GA	GP	W	L	T	GF	GA
Detroit	–	–	–	–	–	–	–	2	1	1	0	2	3
Hamline	–	–	–	–	–	–	–	7	0	7	0	6	38
Macalester	–	–	–	–	–	–	–	9	8	1	0	39	11
Marquette	12	9	3	0	.750	39	26	16	12	4	0	60	33
Michigan	19	10	7	2	.579	47	34	21	12	7	2	55	36
Michigan State	2	0	2	0	.000	1	14	5	1	4	0	5	18
Michigan Tech	10	2	7	1	.250	14	48	13	5	7	1	56	51
Minnesota	16	7	8	1	.469	38	35	18	7	9	2	42	44
North Dakota	2	0	2	0	.000	2	10	2	0	2	0	2	10
North Dakota Agricultural	–	–	–	–	–	–	–	3	1	2	0	7	16
Saint Mary's	–	–	–	–	–	–	–	11	4	4	3	30	15
St. Thomas	–	–	–	–	–	–	–	8	4	3	1	19	8
Wisconsin	11	5	5	1	.500	20	23	12	5	6	1	21	26

1929–30 Pacific Coast Conference ice hockey standings
	Conference							Overall					
	GP	W	L	T	PTS	GF	GA	GP	W	L	T	GF	GA
California	–	–	–	–	–	–	–	–	–	–	–	–	–
USC	–	–	–	–	–	–	–	–	–	–	–	–	–
UCLA	5	0	4	1	.100	8	21	5	0	4	1	8	21
* indicates conference champion
