= California Golden Bears men's ice hockey =

- University: University of California, Berkeley
- Conference: Pac-8
- First season: 1928–29
- Head coach: Mark Cornwell
- Arena: Oakland Ice Center; Berkeley, California
- Colors: Blue and gold

The California Golden Bears men's ice hockey team is a college ice hockey program that represents the University of California, Berkeley. They are a member of the American Collegiate Hockey Association at the Division II level. The university sponsored varsity ice hockey from 1928 to 1949.

== History ==
Cal joined several other California schools in founding an ice hockey program in the late 1920s and continued on with the sport despite the Great Depression hitting its budget throughout the '30s. Cal, along with most other schools, shuttered its program for the duration of World War II but was the only Pacific coast team to return after the war. The Golden Bears attempted to continue their program but, without a nearby rival to keep the interest up, Cal was forced to shutter the program in 1949.

The team was partially revived as a club sport later and continues to operate on an informal basis as of 2023.
