= Don McFadyen =

Canadian ice hockey player

- Born: March 24, 1907 Crossfield, Alberta, Canada
- Died: May 26, 1990 (aged 83)
- Height: 5 ft 9 in (175 cm)
- Weight: 163 lb (74 kg; 11 st 9 lb)
- Position: Centre
- Shot: Left
- Played for: Chicago Black Hawks
- Playing career: 1930–1936

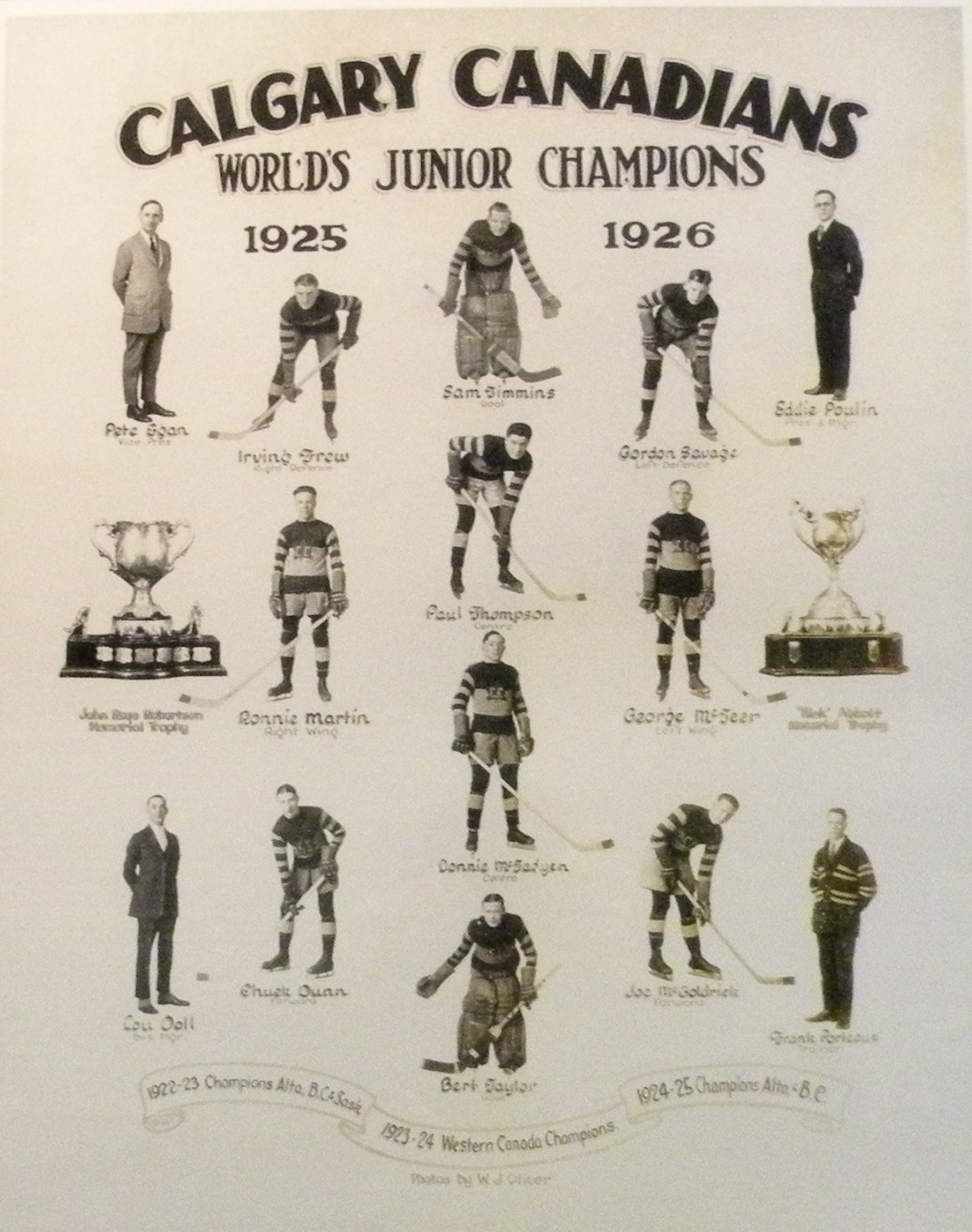
The 1926 Calgary Canadians. McFayden is in the middle column, third from top.

Donald Phillip McFadyen (March 24, 1907 – May 26, 1990) was a Canadian ice hockey player who played 164 games in the National Hockey League with the Chicago Black Hawks from 1932 to 1936. He won the Stanley Cup with Chicago in 1934. McFadyen was born in Crossfield, Alberta

== Career statistics ==
=== Regular season and playoffs ===
| | | | Regular season | | | | | Playoffs |
| Season | Team | League | GP | G | A | Pts | PIM | GP | G | A | Pts | PIM |
|---|---|---|---|---|---|---|---|---|---|---|---|---|
| 1924–25 | Calgary Canadians | CCJHL | — | — | — | — | — | — | — | — | — | — |
| 1924–25 | Calgary Canadians | M-Cup | — | — | — | — | — | 2 | 0 | 0 | 0 | 0 |
| 1925–26 | Calgary Canadians | CCJHL | — | — | — | — | — | — | — | — | — | — |
| 1925–26 | Calgary Canadians | M-Cup | — | — | — | — | — | 9 | 6 | 7 | 13 | 14 |
| 1926–27 | Marquette University | NCAA | — | — | — | — | — | — | — | — | — | — |
| 1927–28 | Marquette University | NCAA | — | — | — | — | — | — | — | — | — | — |
| 1928–29 | Marquette University | NCAA | — | — | — | — | — | — | — | — | — | — |
| 1929–30 | Marquette University | NCAA | — | — | — | — | — | — | — | — | — | — |
| 1930–31 | Chicago Shamrocks | AHA | 47 | 21 | 11 | 32 | 60 | — | — | — | — | — |
| 1931–32 | Chicago Shamrocks | AHA | 48 | 13 | 7 | 30 | 40 | 4 | 0 | 1 | 1 | 4 |
| 1932–33 | Chicago Black Hawks | NHL | 48 | 5 | 10 | 15 | 20 | — | — | — | — | — |
| 1933–34 | Chicago Black Hawks | NHL | 43 | 1 | 3 | 4 | 20 | 8 | 2 | 2 | 4 | 5 |
| 1934–35 | Chicago Black Hawks | NHL | 37 | 2 | 5 | 7 | 4 | 2 | 0 | 0 | 0 | 0 |
| 1935–36 | Chicago Black Hawks | NHL | 48 | 4 | 16 | 20 | 33 | 1 | 0 | 0 | 0 | 0 |
| NHL totals | | | 176 | 12 | 34 | 46 | 77 | 11 | 2 | 2 | 4 | 5 |
