= Pudge MacKenzie =

American ice hockey player

- Born: July 11, 1906; Cambridge, Massachusetts, U.S.
- Died: June 11, 1960 (aged 53); Kansas City, Missouri, U.S.
- Height: 5 ft 8 in (173 cm)
- Weight: 175 lb (79 kg; 12 st 7 lb)
- Position: Right Wing
- Shot: Right
- Played for: Chicago Black Hawks
- Playing career: 1930–1940

Clarence Addison "Pudge" MacKenzie (July 11, 1906 - June 11, 1960) was an American-born Canadian ice hockey player. He played 36 games in the National Hockey League with the Chicago Black Hawks during the 1932–33 season. Before playing in the NHL, MacKenzie (who grew up in Calgary, Canada) had played at the collegiate level with Marquette and in the American Hockey Association with the Chicago Shamrocks, the St. Paul Greyhounds and the Tulsa Oilers. Afterwards, he returned to the AHA and played with the Kansas City Greyhounds, retiring in 1940. During two seasons, he was a player-coach with the team.

== Career statistics ==
=== Regular season and playoffs ===
			Regular season					Playoffs
Season	Team	League	GP	G	A	Pts	PIM	GP	G	A	Pts	PIM
1926–27	Marquette University	NCAA	—	—	—	—	—	—	—	—	—	—
1927–28	Marquette University	NCAA	—	—	—	—	—	—	—	—	—	—
1928–29	Marquette University	NCAA	—	—	—	—	—	—	—	—	—	—
1929–30	Marquette University	NCAA	—	—	—	—	—	—	—	—	—	—
1930–31	Chicago Shamrocks	AHA	42	10	6	16	55	—	—	—	—	—
1931–32	Chicago Shamrocks	AHA	48	4	5	9	45	4	1	0	1	4
1932–33	St. Paul Greyhounds	AHA	9	1	1	2	10	—	—	—	—	—
1932–33	Tulsa Oilers	AHA	—	—	—	—	—	—	—	—	—	—
1932–33	Chicago Black Hawks	NHL	36	4	4	8	13	—	—	—	—	—
1933–34	Kansas City Greyhounds	AHA	48	14	13	27	43	3	1	0	1	2
1934–35	Kansas City Greyhounds	AHA	46	4	21	25	42	2	0	1	1	2
1935–36	Kansas City Greyhounds	AHA	43	12	15	27	12	—	—	—	—	—
1936–37	Kansas City Greyhounds	AHA	45	7	16	23	20	3	0	1	1	4
1937–38	Kansas City Greyhounds	AHA	48	15	20	35	10	—	—	—	—	—
1938–39	Kansas City Greyhounds	AHA	46	9	35	44	15	—	—	—	—	—
1939–40	Kansas City Greyhounds	AHA	1	0	0	0	0	—	—	—	—	—
1939–40	St. Louis Flyers	AHA	40	9	10	19	28	5	0	0	0	0
AHA totals			416	85	142	227	280	17	2	2	4	12
NHL totals			36	4	4	8	13	—	—	—	—	—
