= Minneapolis Arena =

Ice hockey arena in Minneapolis

Coordinates: 44°57′0.12″N 93°17′35.6″W

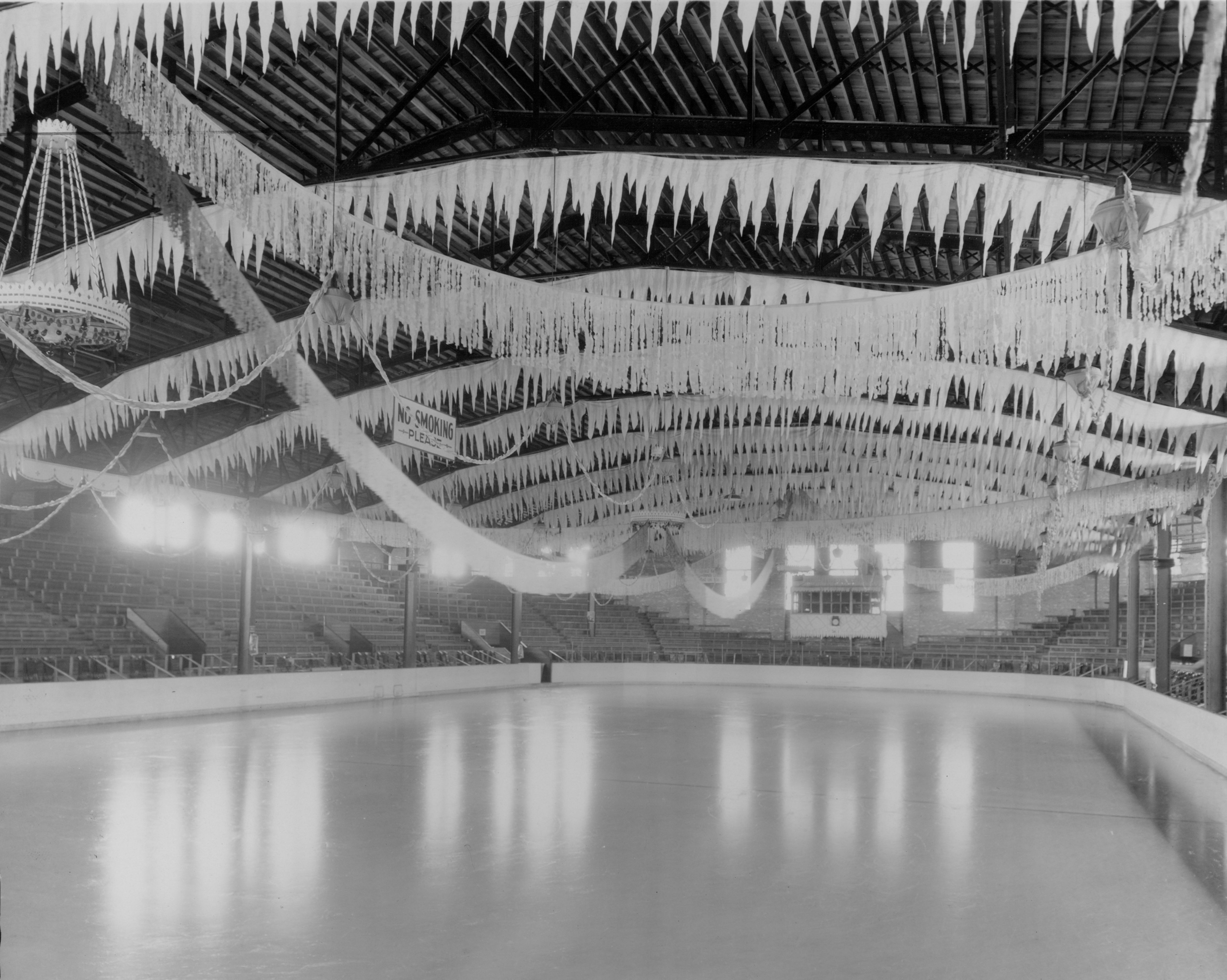
Minneapolis Arena in 1929

The Minneapolis Arena was an indoor ice rink in Minneapolis, Minnesota, USA, that hosted the various Minneapolis Millers teams from 1925 until 1963 and the Minneapolis Bruins of the Central Hockey League from 1963 until 1965. It held 5,500 people and was located at 2900 Dupont Avenue South in the Uptown district of Minneapolis. The University of Minnesota's Golden Gophers ice hockey team used the arena as one of its primary home rinks from 1925 until 1950. The annual shows of the Shipstads and Johnson Ice Follies were held at the venue from 1936 until 1966. Lyle Wright was an events promoter and one of the presidents of the arena, and was later inducted into the United States Hockey Hall of Fame.
