= Palais de Glace (Los Angeles) =

Indoor, artificial ice rink

- Winter Garden
- Interactive map of Palais de Glace
- Location: 650 N Vermont Ave; Los Angeles, California, 90004
- Coordinates: 34°05′01″N 118°17′30″W
- Capacity: 4,500
- Surface: 170 x 70 ft.

Construction
- Opened: February 10, 1925
- Closed: September, 1934
- Demolished: 1934 (fire)

Tenants
- Hollywood Millionaires (1927–1933); Los Angeles Richfields (1927–1932); Loyola Lions men's ice hockey (1930–1934); UCLA Bruins men's ice hockey (1927–1934); USC Trojans men's ice hockey (1925–1934)

The Palais de Glace (Ice Palace) in Los Angeles, California was an indoor, artificial ice rink. The venue was the first artificial ice rink in Southern California and served the community until it was destroyed by fire in 1934.

== History ==
Opened in February of 1925, the Palais de Glace became the center of the ice hockey community in Los Angeles. The nascent programs at local colleges all moved their programs to the rink by the start of the next year and the building swiftly became the home of Occidental, Southwestern, UCLA and USC. Shortly thereafter, the rink also became home to LA's first two professional ice hockey teams: the Hollywood Millionaires and Los Angeles Richfields.

Aside from hockey, the building also served as a figure skating rink and even played host to a fashion show held by Peggy Hamilton. The rink operated for just under nine years before being destroyed by a fire in September of 1934.

== Dimensions ==
In order to fit into the building's area of 140 by 325 feet and provide adequate seating, the rink's surface was 70 by 170 feet. While this was smaller than many of the newer rinks, it was still sufficient to meet most regulations at the time. The smaller rink size allowed seating for 4,500 people and also reduced the requirements for cooling. 47,000 feet of piping was needed to cool the rink with 20,000 gallons of brine being sent through the tubing.
