= Marquette Golden Eagles men's ice hockey =

- University: Marquette University
- Conference: NCHL; Black Division
- First season: 1922–23
- Head coach: Troy Riddle; 1st season, 15–9–0
- Arena: The Ponds of Brookfield; Milwaukee, Wisconsin
- Colors: Blue and gold

The Marquette Golden Eagles men's ice hockey team is a college ice hockey program that represents Marquette University. They are a member of the American Collegiate Hockey Association at the Division II level. The university sponsored varsity ice hockey from 1922 to 1933.

== History ==
Marquette was one of several midwestern colleges to found a varsity hockey program in the early 1920s. The Blue and Gold began playing in 1922 and rose to the top of their field, twice winning the Western Intercollegiate Championship. As was common with many schools of the era, Marquette's team suffered with the vagaries of weather and a series of warm winters in the early 30s put the program in jeopardy. Unfortunately, this was also a period where funding was lacking due to the Great Depression and Marquette suspended their program in 1933. Many other schools were forced to stop playing under similar circumstances, however, most eventually restarted their programs.

Marquette did rekindle their team in 1969 after a new rink was finished. However, the school never promoted the team above club status and the Golden Eagles remain at that level (as of 2021).

== Season-by-season results ==
Note: GP = Games played, W = Wins, L = Losses, T = Ties, Pts = Points

Champions	NCAA Frozen Four	Conference Regular Season Champions	Conference Playoff Champions

Season	Conference	Regular Season											Conference Tournament Results	National Tournament Results
Season	Conference	Conference						Overall					Conference Tournament Results	National Tournament Results
Season	Conference	GP	W	L	T	Pts*	Finish	GP	W	L	T	%	Conference Tournament Results	National Tournament Results
George Grady (1922–1923)
1922–23	Independent	–	–	–	–	–	–	5	0	3	2	.200		
Jake Thomsen (1923–1924)
1923–24	Independent	–	–	–	–	–	–	8	3	5	0	.375		
Harold Garry (1924–1925)
1924–25	Independent	–	–	–	–	–	–	3	1	2	0	.333		
Art Schinner (1925–1926)
1925–26	Independent	–	–	–	–	–	–	7	0	6	1	.071		
Kay Iverson (1926–1930)
1926–27	Independent	–	–	–	–	–	–	7	5	2	0	.714		
1927–28	Independent	–	–	–	–	–	–	14	12	1	1	.893		Western Intercollegiate Champions
1928–29	Independent	–	–	–	–	–	–	14	9	5	0	.643		
1929–30	Independent	–	–	–	–	–	–	16	12	4	0	.750		Western Intercollegiate Champions
John Hancock (1930–1932)
1930–31	Independent	–	–	–	–	–	–	14	8	5	1	.607		
1931–32	Independent	–	–	–	–	–	–	10	5	4	1	.550		
Harold Garry (1932–1933)
1932–33	Independent	–	–	–	–	–	–	12	8	3	1	.708		
Totals								GP	W	L	T	%	Championships	
Regular Season								110	63	40	7	.605		
Conference Post-season								0	0	0	0	–		
NCAA Post-season								0	0	0	0	–		
Regular Season and Post-season Record								110	63	40	7	.605	2 Western Intercollegiate Championships	

* Winning percentage is used when conference schedules are unbalanced.

== Golden Eagles in the NHL ==
= NHL All-Star team	= NHL All-Star	= NHL All-Star and NHL All-Star team	= Hall of Famers

Player	Position	Team(s)	Years	Games	Stanley Cups
Pudge MacKenzie	Right wing	CHI	1932–1933	36	0
Don McFadyen	Center	CHI	1932–1936	164	1
