= University of Michigan Coliseum =

Gymnasium

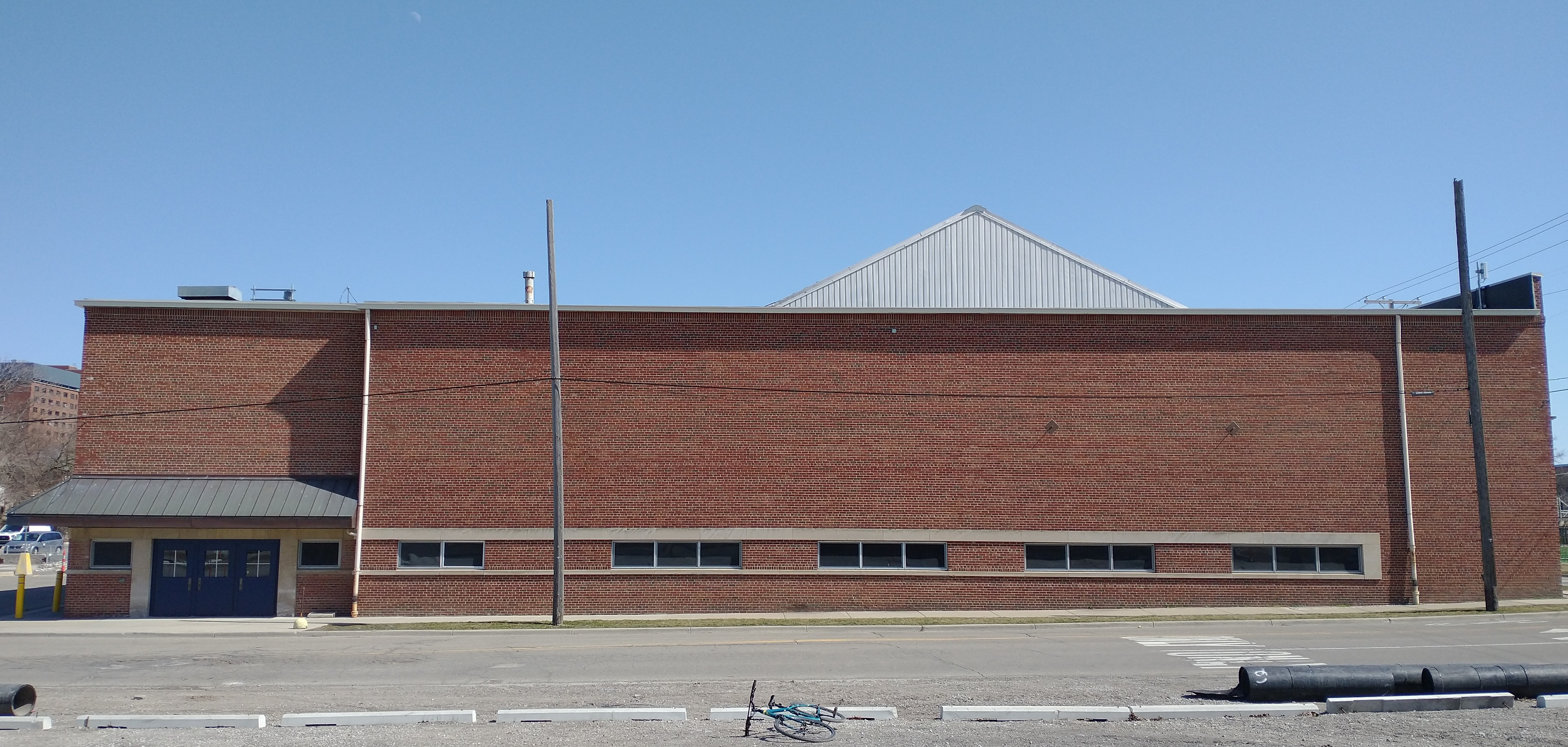
- Interactive map of University of Michigan Coliseum
- Former names: Weinberg Coliseum
- Location: 721 S. Fifth Ave. Ann Arbor, MI 48104
- Coordinates: 42°16′19″N 83°44′47″W
- Owner: University of Michigan
- Operator: University of Michigan

Construction
- Groundbreaking: 1909*
- Opened: 1909 (116–117 years ago)
- Architect: Fred Weinberg

Tenant
- Michigan Wolverines ice hockey (1920–1973)

The University of Michigan Coliseum is an indoor gymnasium located in Ann Arbor, Michigan. It was the home of the Michigan varsity ice hockey team from 1920 to 1973. It is currently used as an all-purpose facility for several Michigan sports programs.

== History ==
The foundation for the original indoor rink, then called the Weinberg Coliseum, was likely poured in 1909 by local Ann Arbor contractor Fred Weinberg. Initially the ice was cooled only by the chill winter air but after the University of Michigan purchased the facility in 1925 an artificial ice system was installed and gave the ice hockey team a home with consistent ice. After the purchase, the building was simply known as the Michigan Coliseum.

While the facility served as the home for the team for over fifty years, the building was prohibitively small, even after a 1949 remodeling, and was eventually replaced by the Yost Ice Arena in 1973. During its lifetime as an ice rink, the Weinberg Coliseum was home to seven National Championship teams.

After the ice was removed for the final time the Coliseum was recycled for use as a gymnasium and used by various university programs over the years but mostly by the men's and women's gymnastics teams.

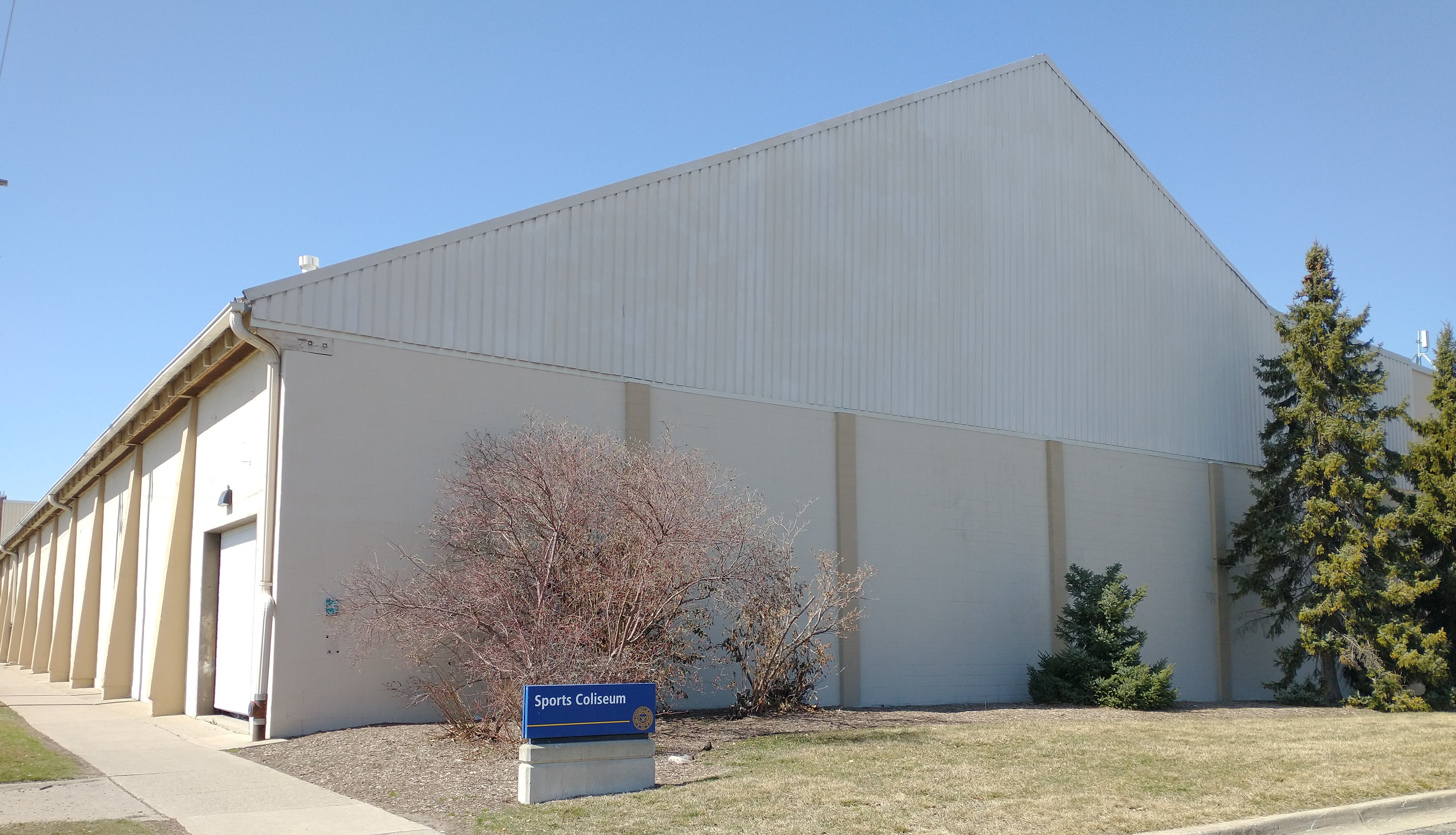
The back of the Michigan coliseum
