= Hilltop Rink =

Outdoor ice rink located in Milwaukee, Wisconsin

- Interactive map of Hilltop Rink
- Location: 510 N. 16th St; Milwaukee, WI 53201
- Coordinates: 43°2′12.5″N 87°55′56.5″W
- Owner: Marquette University
- Operator: Marquette University

Construction
- Groundbreaking: 1924
- Opened: 1924 (101–102 years ago)
- Closed: 1933 (92–93 years ago)

Tenant
- Marquette Golden Eagles ice hockey (1924-1933)

The Hilltop Rink was an outdoor ice rink located in Milwaukee, Wisconsin. It was the home of the Marquette varsity ice hockey team from 1924 to 1933. The rink was built north of the Marquette Gymnasium where Emory T. Clark Hall currently sits.

== History ==
The Marquette hockey team used an indoor facility called the 'Arena Ice Gardens' for the first two years of its existence. In 1924, however, the building was converted into a garage and the team had to scramble to find a new home. Late in the year a rink was constructed on a field north of the new gymnasium so that the team had a rink for both practice and games.

Due to warm weather, the team could only use the rink sparingly in the mid-20's but cold winters came in the latter part of the decade. That period also coincided with the Hilltoppers winning two intercollegiate championships (1928 and 1930) and becoming one of the top programs in college hockey. During their second championship run, the team was able to attract several thousand spectators to their games and was a source of pride for the university.

Shortly after the Great Depression began, the region experienced several consecutive years of warm winters. Because the rink was an outdoor venue, it was completely at the mercy of the weather and the team had precious little ice to practice on, let alone play a game. in 1932 the team played just two games at home, followed by one the following year. In 1933–34 the team cancelled its entire season due to a lack of ice and, due to a lack of funding, no upgrades or replacement could be affected. Marquette didn't build an indoor rink until 1969 but by then the success of the team was a distant memory. Since the closure of the Hilltop rink, Marquette has yet to play another varsity hockey game (as of 2021).
