= UCLA Bruins men's ice hockey =

- University: University of California, Los Angeles
- Conference: WCHC; Tier 1 Division
- First season: 1926–27
- Head coach: Griffin McCarty; 2021 - Present season
- Captain(s): Jonathan Alterman; John Ilvento
- Alternate captain(s): Alex Setteducati; Owen Sweeney
- Arena: The Cube Ice and Entertainment Center, Santa Clarita, California; Los Angeles, California
- Colors: Blue and gold

Conference tournament champions
- 2024 WCHC Playoff Runner-ups

Conference regular season champions
- 2022-2023 WCHC Regular Season Champions

The UCLA Bruins men's ice hockey team is a non-varsity, non-NCAA college ice hockey program that represents the University of California, Los Angeles. They are a member of the American Collegiate Hockey Association at the Division II level. The university sponsored varsity ice hockey from 1926 to 1941.

== History ==
Before the school was even called 'UCLA', the ice hockey program was formed, joining several other local teams including USC and Occidental. The team continued for several years despite the Great Depression being in full force. In the late 1930s a new arena was built for the Los Angeles programs but World War II forced all of the pacific coast teams to shutter their programs in the early '40s. When teams were reconstituted afterwards, UCLA was not among the programs to resurface and the new arena, the Tropical Ice Gardens, was demolished in 1949.

UCLA eventually returned to the ice in 1961 but only as a club sport. Until recently, it played against many of its former varsity opponents in the Pac-8.

Currently, UCLA plays in the West Coast Hockey Conference in the Tier 1 division against rivals like Loyola Marymount, Long Beach State, Grand Canyon, Northern Arizona, Arizona State, and others. They've made back to back appearances at the ACHA Men's D2 Western Region playoffs. They are currently coached by former player Griffin McCarty, son of the Detroit Red Wings legend Darren McCarty and Sean Allen, a former Hamilton College men's hockey player.

Historically, UCLA and USC have faced off in an annual 5-game series dubbed "The Crosstown Cup". Up until the COVID-19 pandemic, one of the games took place at the Staples Center in downtown Los Angeles.

Note: UCLA used the same color scheme as the University of California, Berkeley until 1949.

== Statistics ==
=== Career points leaders ===
| Player | Years | GP | G | A | Pts | PIM |
|---|---|---|---|---|---|---|
| Duke Fishman | 2019-2023 | 52 | 49 | 50 | 99 | 22 |
| John Ilvento | 2021-2023 | 46 | 42 | 38 | 80 | 16 |
| Nicholas Katzaroff | 2014-2017 | 66 | 42 | 38 | 80 | 52 |
| Daniel Vaynter | 2008-2011 | 43 | 37 | 36 | 73 | 24 |
| Michael Carder | 2006-2012 | 88 | 31 | 35 | 66 | 96 |
| Griffin McCarty | 2018-2020 | 34 | 34 | 25 | 59 | 6 |
| Mark Yost | 2007-2012 | 72 | 29 | 29 | 58 | 80 |
| Peter Katz | 2015-2019 | 58 | 31 | 24 | 55 | 10 |
| Po-Yun Hsiao | 2013-2017 | 81 | 29 | 26 | 55 | 6 |
| Abby Smith | 2007-2011 | 56 | 25 | 26 | 51 | 81 |

== Team ==
=== Current roster ===
as of November 19, 2023.

| No. | Nat. | Player | Class | Pos | Height | Weight | DoB | Hometown | Previous team | NHL rights |
|---|---|---|---|---|---|---|---|---|---|---|
| 2 | | Max Oppenheim | Freshman | F | 5' 8" (1.73 m) | 150 lb (68 kg) | 2005-02-10 | Philadelphia, Pennsylvania | Golden State Eagles 18U AA 1 (Midget AA) | — |
| 3 | | Jarod Miller | Sophomore | D | 6' 1" (1.85 m) | 190 lb (86 kg) | 2004-06-03 | Chino Hills, California | Anaheim Jr. Ducks 18U AAA (Midget AAA, T1EHL) | — |
| 5 | | Daniel Parizek | Senior | D | 5' 11" (1.8 m) | 154 lb (70 kg) | 2001-09-07 | Carlsbad, California | Pacific Ridge School (USHS-CA) | — |
| 7 | | Holden Thayer-Gladstone | Freshman | D | 6' 1" (1.85 m) | 160 lb (73 kg) | 2005-07-03 | Venice Beach, California | Empire Hockey Club 18U AA (Midget AA) | — |
| 9 | | Duke Fishman | Graduate | F | 5' 11" (1.8 m) | 276 lb (125 kg) | 2000-08-30 | Los Angeles, California | The Frederick Gunn School (USHS-Prep) | — |
| 10 | | Thomas Wells | Sophomore | F | 6' 1" (1.85 m) | 176 lb (80 kg) | 2003-11-13 | Brooklyn, New York | New York City Cyclones 18U AA (Midget AA) | — |
| 11 | | John Ilvento (C) | Senior | F | 5' 10" (1.78 m) | 170 lb (77 kg) | 2002-06-03 | South Lake Tahoe, California | Victory Honda 18U AAA (Midget AAA, T1EHL) | — |
| 13 | | Musashi Eto | Junior | F | 6' 0" (1.83 m) | 176 lb (80 kg) | 2003-06-16 | Flemington, New Jersey | Hunterdon Bears 18U AA (Midget AA) | — |
| 14 | | Ishaan Sethi | Sophomore | F | 6' 3" (1.91 m) | 181 lb (82 kg) | 2004-07-13 | Potomac, MD | Landon School (USHS-MD) | — |
| 16 | | Joshua Yu | Graduate | F | | | | Sunnyvale, California | | — |
| 17 | | George Furey | Sophomore | F | 6' 3" (1.91 m) | 194 lb (88 kg) | 2004-09-02 | | Shaker Heights High School (USHS–OH) | — |
| 19 | | Anastasios "Tommy" Tasigeorgos | Junior | F | 5' 10" (1.78 m) | 161 lb (73 kg) | 2002-06-27 | Tustin, California | Beckman High School (USHS-CA) | — |
| 20 | | Steven Soos | Freshman | F | 5' 8" (1.73 m) | 159 lb (72 kg) | 2003-01-21 | Altadena, California | Long Beach Shredders (USPHL) | — |
| 21 | | Brendan Pelikh | Sophomore | F | 6' 3" (1.91 m) | 190 lb (86 kg) | 2003-09-04 | Encino, California | Groton School (USHS-Prep) | — |
| 22 | | Samir Panwar | Junior | D | 5' 11" (1.8 m) | 170 lb (77 kg) | 2003-08-10 | Long Beach, California | Anaheim Jr. Ducks 18U AA (Midget AA) | — |
| 23 | | Geoffery Xu | Junior | D | 6' 3" (1.91 m) | 170 lb (77 kg) | 2003-01-05 | San Diego, California | Anaheim Jr. Ducks 16U AAA (Midget AAA, T1EHL) | — |
| 27 | | Alex Stensen | Graduate | F | | | 1998-10-07 | Chicago, Illinois | | — |
| 30 | | Jake Kovinsky | Senior | G | 5' 10" (1.78 m) | 165 lb (75 kg) | 2001-11-28 | North Hollywood, California | Burbank Cougars (LAKHSHL) | — |
| 31 | | Brendan Klim | Senior | G | 5' 10" (1.78 m) | 179 lb (81 kg) | 2002-05-03 | Lafayette, California | Tri-Valley Blue Devils 18U AA (Midget AA) | — |
| 32 | | Andrew Lewis | Senior | G | | | 2002-08-10 | Villa Park, California | Villa Park High School (USHS-CA) | — |
| 34 | | Owen Thompson | Sophomore | G | 5' 10" (1.78 m) | 170 lb (77 kg) | 2004-03-27 | Los Gatos, California | Bellarmine College Prep. (USHS-CA) | — |
| 37 | | Alexander "Alex" Setteducati (A) | Senior | D | 5' 10" (1.78 m) | 174 lb (79 kg) | 2002-05-04 | Buffalo, New York | Canisius High School (USHS–NY) | — |
| 43 | | Jonathan Alterman (C) | Senior | F | 6' 1" (1.85 m) | 176 lb (80 kg) | 2002-09-10 | Newport Beach, California | California Wave 18U AA 1 (Midget AA) | — |
| 44 | | Noah Jamani | Junior | D | 6' 4" (1.93 m) | 190 lb (86 kg) | 2002-08-11 | Toronto, Ontario, Canada | Middlesex School (USHS-Prep) | — |
| 50 | | Dionysius "Danny" Tasigeorgos | Junior | G | 5' 10" (1.78 m) | 161 lb (73 kg) | 2002-06-27 | Tustin, California | Beckman High School (USHS-CA) | — |
| 63 | | Owen Sweeney (A) | Junior | F | 6' 2" (1.88 m) | 185 lb (84 kg) | 2003-08-19 | Redwood City, California | San Jose Jr. Sharks 18U AAA (Midget AAA) | — |
| 86 | | Alexander Moroz | Junior | F | 5' 10" (1.78 m) | 174 lb (79 kg) | 2002-12-18 | Mission Viejo, California | Anaheim Jr. Ducks 18U AA (Midget AA) | — |
| 91 | | Michael Shara | Freshman | D | 5' 10" (1.78 m) | 185 lb (84 kg) | 2003-12-03 | Laguna Niguel, California | Merritt Centennials (BCHL) | — |
