= Crossfield, Alberta =

Town in Alberta, Canada

Crossfield
- Town
- Town of Crossfield
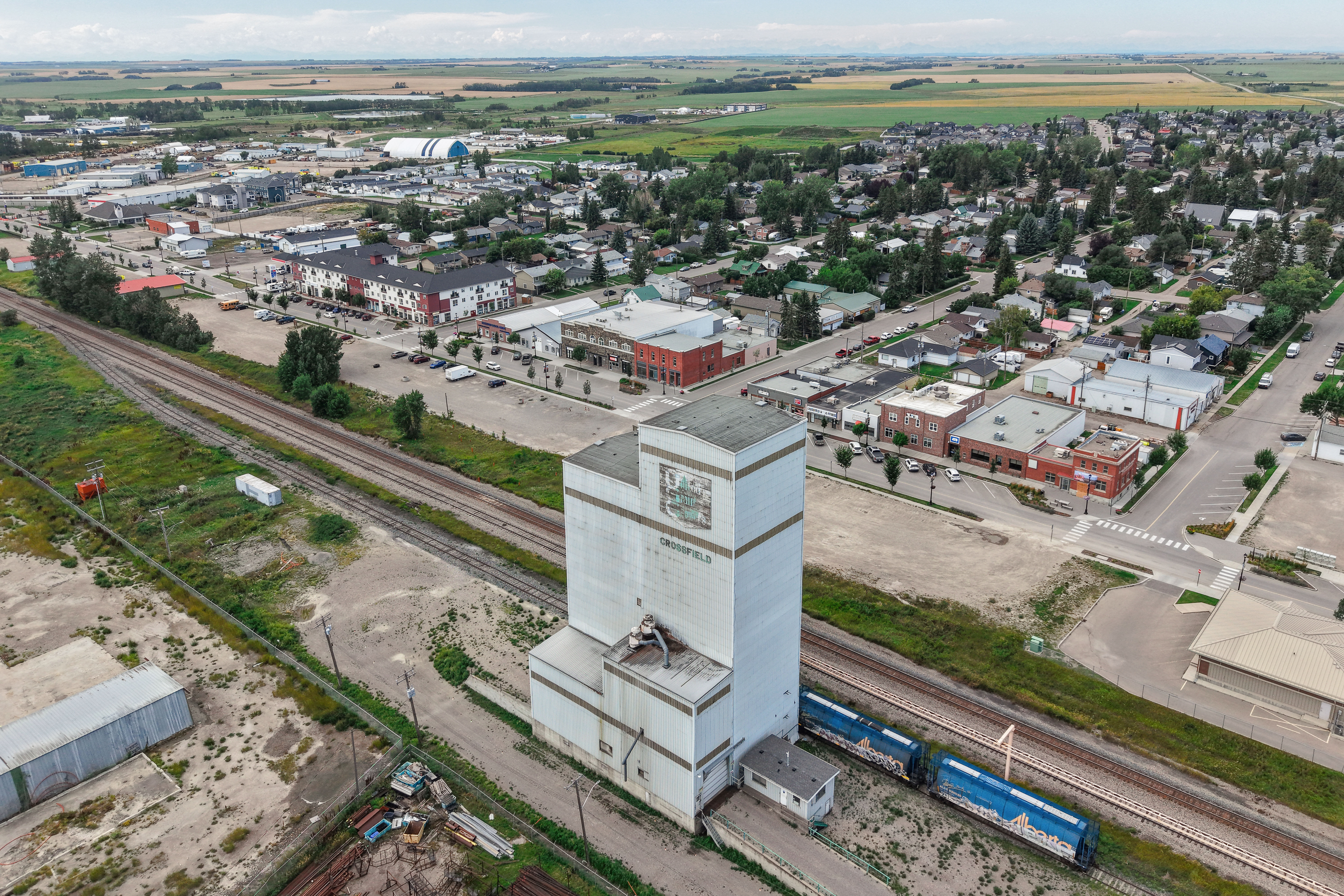
- Downtown (2026)
- Motto: Progress through friendship
- Location of Crossfield in Alberta
- Coordinates: 51°25′52″N 114°01′34″W
- Country: Canada
- Province: Alberta
- Region: Calgary Region
- Census division: 6
- Municipal district: Rocky View County
- Incorporated
  - Village: June 3, 1907
  - Town: August 1, 1980

Government
  - Mayor: Kim Harris
  - Governing body: Crossfield Town Council
  - MP: Blake Richards, Wild Rose

Area (2021)
  - Land: 11.89 km^{2} (4.59 sq mi)
- Elevation: 1,113 m (3,652 ft)

Population (2021)
  - Total: 3,599
  - Density: 302.7/km^{2} (784/sq mi)
- Time zone: UTC−06:00 (Alberta Time)
- Postal code span: T0M 0S0
- Area codes: 403, 587, 825, 368
- Highways: Highway 2A; Highway 574
- Website: Official website

Crossfield is a town in the Calgary Metropolitan Region of Alberta, Canada, that is surrounded by Rocky View County. It is on Highway 2A 43 km (27 mi) north of the City of Calgary.

Crossfield was founded in 1892 as a station on the Calgary and Edmonton Railway (C&E), and named for an engineer with the C&E survey crew. By 1904, the community had a post office, a general store, a hotel and a school. In 1906, the first grain elevator opened and Crossfield was incorporated as a village the following year in 1907. In 1980, Crossfield was incorporated as a town.

Crossfield is a member of the Calgary Metropolitan Region Board. The town is within the Calgary-Edmonton Corridor and is growing as a result. Crossfield is north of the city of Airdrie and south of the town of Olds.

== Demographics ==
In the 2021 Census of Population conducted by Statistics Canada, Crossfield had a population of 3,599 living in 1,326 of its 1,381 private dwellings, a change of 20.7% from its 2016 population of 2,983. With a land area of 11.89 km^{2} (4.59 sq mi), it had a population density of 302.7/km^{2} (784.0/sq mi) in 2021.

According to its 2019 municipal census, the population of Crossfield is 3,377, a change of 2.1% from its 2018 municipal census population of 3,308.

In the 2016 Census of Population conducted by Statistics Canada, Crossfield recorded a population of 2,983 living in 1,101 of its 1,168 private dwellings, a 4.6% change from its 2011 population of 2,853. With a land area of 11.96 km^{2} (4.62 sq mi), it had a population density of 249.4/km^{2} (646.0/sq mi) in 2016.

== Economy ==
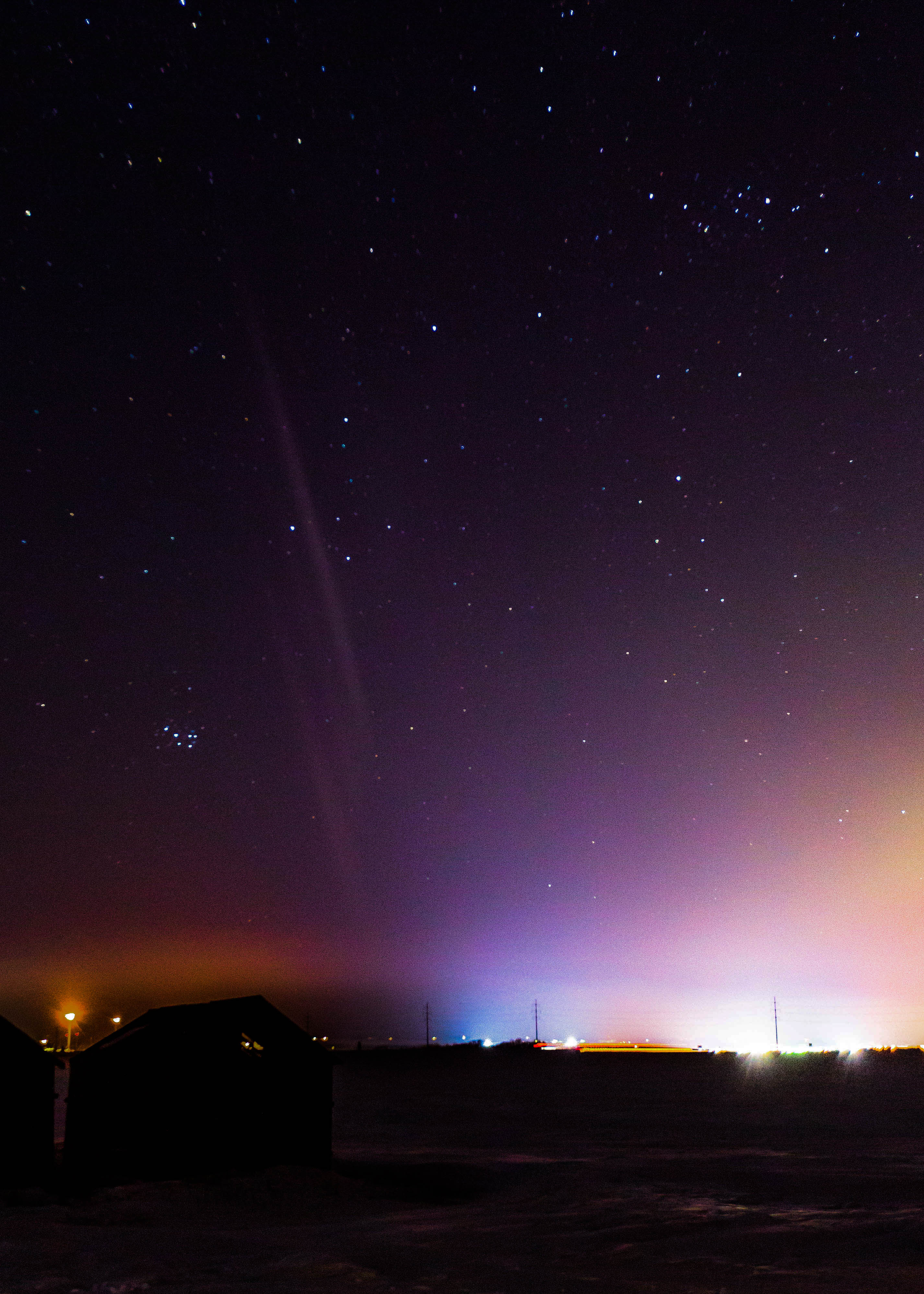
Strong Thermal Emission Velocity Enhancement over Crossfield

The primary economic base of the Crossfield area is agriculture, agricultural services and natural gas processing. The Crossfield Gas Plant, south of the town and owned by TAQA North, has been in operation since 1965.

== Education ==
Crossfield has two schools: Crossfield Elementary School, which teaches children from kindergarten to grade five, and WG Murdoch School, which teaches children from grades six to 12.

The town also has a preschool that is situated on the property of Crossfield Elementary School.

== See also ==
- List of communities in Alberta
- List of towns in Alberta
