= Nick Bawlf =

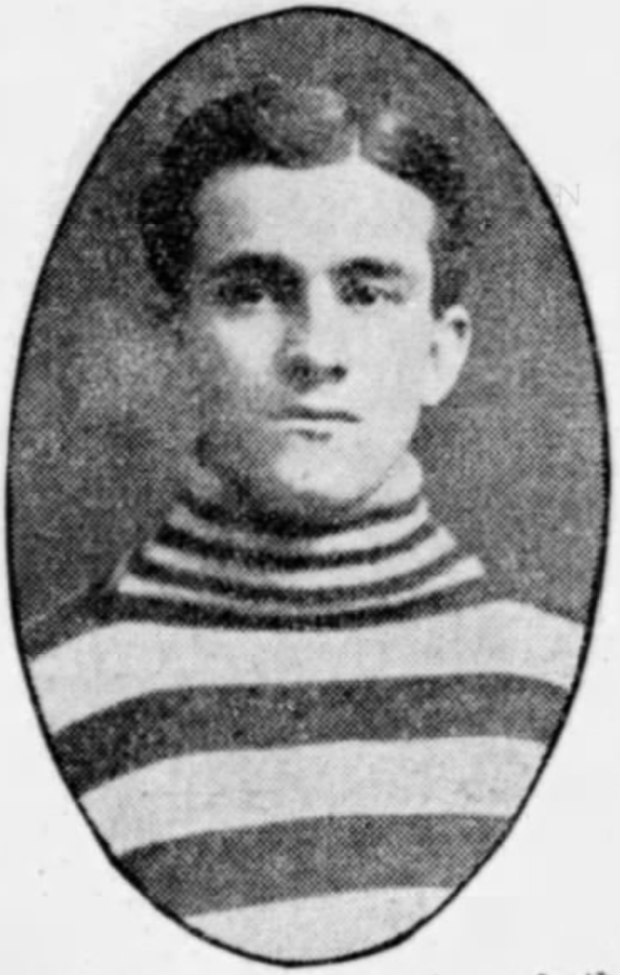
- Born: January 8, 1884 Winnipeg, Manitoba
- Died: June 6, 1947 (aged 63) Ithaca, New York
- Height: 5 ft 8 in (173 cm)
- Weight: 160 lb (73 kg; 11 st 6 lb)
- Position: Centre
- Shot: Right
- Played for: Haileybury Comets; Montreal Canadiens; Montreal Wanderers; Toronto Shamrocks
- Playing career: 1909–1916
- Coaching career

Coaching career (HC unless noted)
- 1920–1947: Cornell

Head coaching record
- Overall: 45–76–4 (.376)

Nicholas John Bawlf (January 8, 1884 – June 6, 1947) was a Canadian ice hockey player, ice hockey coach, soccer coach, and lacrosse coach. He played in the National Hockey Association (NHA) for the Haileybury Comets, Montreal Canadiens, Montreal Wanderers and Toronto Shamrocks.

== Playing career ==
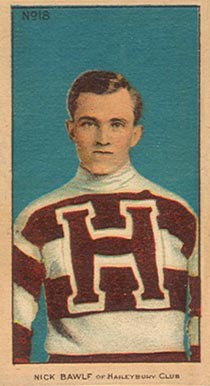
Bawlf with the Haileybury Comets.

Born in Winnipeg, Manitoba, Bawlf first played senior amateur hockey for Winnipeg of the Manitoba Senior Hockey League in 1903. In 1905, he moved to Ottawa to study at Ottawa College, playing for three seasons with the College. He contracted typhoid fever in 1907 and did not play that season. He became a professional with Haileybury in 1910. He played two seasons for the club, the first in the NHA and the second in the Timiskaming Professional Hockey League (TPHL) after the club left the NHA.

In 1911–12, he played for Fort William of the Northern Ontario Hockey League, before returning to the NHA with the Toronto Shamrocks. He was released in mid-season from the Shamrocks and joined the Canadiens. The following season he joined the Wanderers before leaving to enlist in the army.

After his time in the army ended, he became coach at Queen's University of Kingston, Ontario. In 1920, he joined Cornell University where he coached until 1947. Bawlf also coached the Cornell lacrosse team from 1920 until 1939. He was the coach of Cornell soccer from 1920 to 1946.

His cousin Billy Bawlf was also a hockey player and was a member of the 1901 Stanley Cup winning Winnipeg Victorias team, although he did not play in the challenge series on January 29 and 31 against the Montreal Shamrocks (4-3, 2-1).

Nick Bawlf died in Ithaca, New York, on June 6, 1947, after a long illness.

== College head coaching record ==
Record table
Season	Team	Overall	Conference	Standing	Postseason
Cornell Big Red Independent (1920–1931)
1920–21	Cornell	3–2–0			
1921–22	Cornell	4–1–0			
1922–23	Cornell	0–4–2			
1923–24	Cornell	2–2–0			
1924–25	Cornell	1–4–0			
1925–26	Cornell	2–4–0			
1926–27	Cornell	1–6–0			
1927–28	Cornell	2–3–0			
1928–29	Cornell	2–3–0			
1929–30	Cornell	4–2–0			
1930–31	Cornell	3–2–0			
Cornell:		24–33–2			
Cornell Big Red Independent (1933–1947)
1933–34	Cornell	0–1–1			
1934–35	Cornell	2–2–0			
1935–36	Cornell	1–2–1			
1936–37	Cornell	1–1–0			
1937–38	Cornell	0–4–0			
1938–39	Cornell	2–4–0			
1939–40	Cornell	5–6–0			
1940–41	Cornell	2–5–0			
1941–42	Cornell	4–2–0			
1942–43	Cornell	2–2–0			
1943–44	Cornell	1–3–0			
1944–45	Cornell	0–4–0			
1945–46	Cornell	1–3–0			
1946–47	Cornell	0–4–0			
Cornell:		21–43–2			
Total:		45–76–4			
National champion Postseason invitational champion Conference regular season champion Conference regular season and conference tournament champion Division regular season champion Division regular season and conference tournament champion Conference tournament champion
