= Eddie Lowrey =

Canadian ice hockey player and coach

- Coach Eddie Lowrey, 1939
- Born: August 13, 1891 Manotick, Ontario, Canada
- Died: November 27, 1973 (aged 82)
- Height: 5 ft 6 in (168 cm)
- Weight: 160 lb (73 kg; 11 st 6 lb)
- Position: Centre
- Shot: Right
- Played for: NHL; Ottawa Senators; Hamilton Tigers; NHA; Ottawa Senators; Toronto Ontarios; Montreal Canadiens; Toronto Blueshirts
- Playing career: 1912–1921

Edwin James Lowrey (August 13, 1891 – November 27, 1973) was a Canadian ice hockey centre. Lowrey played for Ottawa Senators, Toronto Ontarios, Montreal Canadiens, Toronto Blueshirts, Hamilton Tigers and the Regina Capitals. Lowrey later became the coach of the University of Michigan ice hockey team.

Eddie Lowrey was the older brother of NHL alumni players Fred and Gerry Lowrey. Three other younger brothers – Tom, Frank, and Bill – played with lower-level teams in the Ottawa City Hockey League.

He was the last surviving former player of the Toronto Ontarios.

== Playing career ==
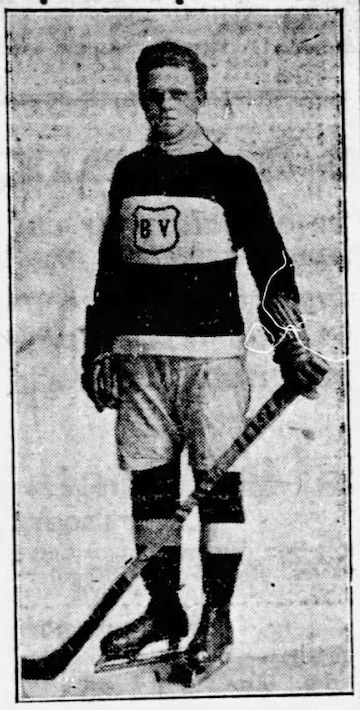
Lowrey with the Ottawa Buena Vistas

Born in Manotick, Ontario near Ottawa, Lowrey played junior hockey in various local leagues for the Ottawa Stewartons (1909–10, 1911–12), Hull Volants (1909–10), Ottawa Buena Vistas (1910–11) and Ottawa New Edinburghs (1912–13) before becoming a professional with the Ottawa Senators in 1912. He played one season for the Senators before being traded to the Toronto Ontarios in January 1914. He played one season with Toronto.

From 1914 until 1916, Lowrey played in the NHA as a spare, playing one game for Montreal and four for Ottawa in 1914–15. In 1915–16, he played two games for the Toronto Blueshirts. In 1916, he played a full season with the Senators and remained with the Senators until 1919. He played for the Senators during the inaugural season of the National Hockey League in 1917–18 and was one of the original NHL players.

== Coaching career ==
His coaching career began in 1919–20 with Ottawa Munitions of the Ottawa City Hockey League before returning to playing for two seasons, one with the Hamilton Tigers and one with the Regina Capitals. In 1922, he joined the University of Ottawa as ice hockey coach.

He became the head coach of the University of Michigan hockey team from 1927 to 1944 and compiled a 124–136–21 record as Michigan's coach. In August 1944, Lowrey was notified by the University of Michigan Board of Athletic Control that he was being released effective in November 1944 for economy reasons. His grandson Mike Lowrey became an assistant hockey coach at the University of Tennessee.

== Career statistics ==
=== Regular season and playoffs ===
			Regular season					Playoffs
Season	Team	League	GP	G	A	Pts	PIM	GP	G	A	Pts	PIM
1909–10	Ottawa Stewartons	OCHL	6	7	0	7	18	1	0	0	0	0
1909–10	Hull Volants	LOVHL	1	0	0	0	0	—	—	—	—	—
1910–11	Ottawa Buena Vistas	OCHL	10	4	0	4	23	—	—	—	—	—
1911–12	Ottawa Stewartons	IPAHU	10	9	0	9	20	—	—	—	—	—
1912–13	Ottawa New Edinburghs	IPAHU	2	2	0	2	15	—	—	—	—	—
1912–13	Ottawa Senators	NHA	13	4	0	4	14	—	—	—	—	—
1913–14	Toronto Ontarios	NHA	16	1	3	4	13	—	—	—	—	—
1914–15	Montreal Canadiens	NHA	1	0	0	0	0	—	—	—	—	—
1914–15	Ottawa Senators	NHA	4	2	1	3	3	2	0	0	0	0
1915–16	Toronto Blueshirts	NHA	2	0	0	0	0	—	—	—	—	—
1916–17	Ottawa Senators	NHA	19	3	1	4	3	2	0	0	0	0
1917–18	Ottawa Senators	NHL	12	2	1	3	3	—	—	—	—	—
1918–19	Ottawa Senators	NHL	10	0	1	1	3	—	—	—	—	—
1919–20	Ottawa Munitions	OCHL	—	—	—	—	—	—	—	—	—	—
1920–21	Hamilton Tigers	NHL	5	0	0	0	0	—	—	—	—	—
1921–22	Regina Capitals	WCHL	7	1	0	1	0	—	—	—	—	—
1921–22	University of Ottawa	OCHL	—	—	—	—	—	—	—	—	—	—
NHA totals			55	10	5	15	33	4	0	0	0	0
NHL totals			27	2	2	4	6	—	—	—	—	—

== College Coaching Record ==
Record table
Season	Team	Overall	Conference	Standing	Postseason
Michigan Wolverines Independent (1927–1944)
1927–28	Michigan	2–10–1			
1928–29	Michigan	5–11–1			
1929–30	Michigan	12–7–2			
1930–31	Michigan	10–5–2			West Intercollegiate Champion
1931–32	Michigan	9–6–2			
1932–33	Michigan	10–4–2			
1933–34	Michigan	10–6–0			
1934–35	Michigan	12–3–2			West Intercollegiate Champion
1935–36	Michigan	7–9–0			
1936–37	Michigan	11–6–1			
1937–38	Michigan	13–6–0			
1938–39	Michigan	8–8–2			
1939–40	Michigan	5–14–1			
1940–41	Michigan	2–14–1			
1941–42	Michigan	2–14–2			
1942–43	Michigan	1–10–2			
1943–44	Michigan	5–3–0			
Michigan:		124–136–21			
Total:		124–136–21			
National champion Postseason invitational champion Conference regular season champion Conference regular season and conference tournament champion Division regular season champion Division regular season and conference tournament champion Conference tournament champion
