= Joseph Stubbs (ice hockey) =

American ice hockey player and coach

Biographical details
- Born: April 28, 1899; Newton, Massachusetts, US
- Died: February 6, 1962 (aged 62); Newton, Massachusetts, US
- Education: Harvard University

Playing career
- 1918–1920: Harvard
- 1920–1921: Boston Athletic Association

Coaching career (HC unless noted)
- 1925–1927: Harvard (assistant)
- 1927–1938: Harvard

Head coaching record
- Overall: 95–43–6 (.681)

Accomplishments and honors

Championships
- 1920 Intercollegiate Championship; 1930 East Intercollegiate co-championship 1932 East Intercollegiate Championship; 1933 Quadrangular Championship; 1933 East Intercollegiate Championship; 1936 Quadrangular Championship; 1936 East Intercollegiate co-championship 1937 Quadrangular Championship; 1937 East Intercollegiate Championship

Joseph Stubbs (April 28, 1899 – February 6, 1962) was an American ice hockey player and coach for Harvard who was active in the 1910s, 1920s and 1930s.

== Career ==
Stubbs began attending Harvard University in 1916 and was a member of the freshman hockey team. Due to the United States' entry into World War I, Harvard suspended its varsity ice hockey team the following year, but Stubbs joined the informal team that was put together by the remaining undergraduates. After the program was restarted following the end of the war, Stubbs was busy with his studies and did not participate. For his senior season, however, Stubbs finally joined the team and helped the team win 10 consecutive games to capture the Intercollegiate Championship in 1920.

After graduating, Stubbs briefly played amateur hockey with the Boston Athletic Association before retiring as a player. He returned to his alma mater as an assistant coach in 1925 and worked primarily with the defense. After helping Harvard win back-to-back Eastern Intercollegiate Championships, Stubbs was promoted to head coach after the resignation of Edward Bigelow. Stubbs had big shoes to fill but he got off to a good start, leading Harvard to a 7–2 record in his first season. The team declined a bit in his second season but did manage to hand Yale its only loss on the year. In his third season, Stubbs led Harvard through some ups and downs but had his team in contention for the intercollegiate title when they met Yale at season's end. The two finished tied with a record of 1–1–1 after three games, including an epic three overtime game. While both teams immediately drew up plans for a fourth match to decide the championship, Harvard's athletic director, W. J. Bingham, decided to end the team's season. While the ending didn't please anyone, it did give Harvard a (shared) intercollegiate championship.

In 1931, Stubbs had Harvard looking as good as they ever had. The team ran through all of its competition, posting 5 shutouts and allowing just 10 goals in 11 games. The Crimson entered their best-of-three series with Yale as a narrow favorite but were stunned by the powerful Elis; Harvard surrendered 8 goals in two games, while scoring just 2 for themselves. After the disappointing finish, Harvard began the following season with a near repeat performance, entering the Yale series with a 10–1 record. Stubbs' team drew first blood, capturing the first game 4–1, and then held off the rabid Bulldogs with two ties, both going into double overtime. The season ended with Harvard on top of all eastern teams by itself, earning Stubbs his first outright championship.

After repeating as champions in 1933, Harvard took a sharp decline and posted its worst season in almost 40 years. The Crimson rebounded quickly, however, and Stubbs had the team back on the winning side of the ledger in 1935. He got Harvard to win a second pair of Championships in '36 (shared) and '37, losing only to McGill in the latter. Just like after the earlier double feat, Harvard posted a losing record in 1938. This time, however, Stubbs wouldn't be around to rebuild the program. After eleven seasons behind the bench and five championships, Stubbs resigned as head coach.

Harvard would eventually choose Clark Hodder as Stubbs' successor but the era of Harvard as the premier college program was over. After Stubbs stepped down, it would be more than 50 years before the Crimson would win another ice hockey championship.

== Statistics ==
=== Regular season and playoffs ===
			Regular season					Playoffs
Season	Team	League	GP	G	A	Pts	PIM	GP	G	A	Pts	PIM
1919–20	Harvard	NCAA	—	—	—	—	—	—	—	—	—	—
1920–21	Boston Athletic Association	Independent	—	—	—	—	—	—	—	—	—	—

Note: Assists were not recorded as an official statistic.

== Head coaching record ==
Record table
Season	Team	Overall	Conference	Standing	Postseason
Harvard Crimson Independent (1927–1932)
1927–28	Harvard	7–2–0			
1928–29	Harvard	5–4–1			
1929–30	Harvard	7–4–1			East Intercollegiate co-Champion
1930–31	Harvard	11–2–0			
1931–32	Harvard	11–1–2			East Intercollegiate Champion
Harvard:		41–13–4			
Harvard Crimson (Quadrangular League) (1932–1938)
1932–33	Harvard	9–5–0	6–2–0	1st	East Intercollegiate Champion
1933–34	Harvard	4–9–0	1–6–0	4th	
1934–35	Harvard	8–4–0	5–2–0	2nd	
1935–36	Harvard	12–4–1	6–2–0	1st	East Intercollegiate co-Champion
1936–37	Harvard	15–1–0	6–0–0	1st	East Intercollegiate Champion
1937–38	Harvard	6–7–1	2–4–1	3rd	
Harvard:		54–30–2	26–16–1		
Total:		95–43–6			
National champion Postseason invitational champion Conference regular season champion Conference regular season and conference tournament champion Division regular season champion Division regular season and conference tournament champion Conference tournament champion
