= 1946–47 North Dakota Fighting Sioux men's ice hockey season =

- Conference: Independent
- Home ice: Winter Sports Building

Record
- Overall: 7–6–0
- Home: 5–4–0
- Road: 1–1–0
- Neutral: 1–1–0

Coaches and captains
- Head coach: John Jamieson

The 1946–47 North Dakota Fighting Sioux men's ice hockey season was the 7th season in program history. The Fighting Sioux represented the University of North Dakota in the 1946–47 United States collegiate men's ice hockey season, played their home games at the Winter Sports Building and were coached by John Jamieson in his first and only season with the team.

== Roster ==
No.	Nat.	Player	Class	Pos	Height	Weight	DoB	Hometown	Previous team
	(United States)	Robert Mowris		D				Thief River Falls, Minnesota
	(United States)	William Killian		F				Seattle, Washington
	(United States)	Jim Flannery		F				Jamestown, North Dakota
	(United States)	Archie Graham		F				Grand Forks, North Dakota
	(Canada)	Gerald Patterson		G			1922-11-18	Rainy River, Ontario
	(United States)	John Johnson		F				Grand Forks, North Dakota
	(United States)	James Healey		F				Grand Forks, North Dakota
3	(United States)	Robert Peskey		D				St. Louis Park, Minnesota
5	(United States)	Robert Hegraness		F				Grand Forks, North Dakota
13	(United States)	Raymond Bostrom		D				Grand Forks, North Dakota
15	(United States)	Albert Hausauer		D			1923-08-02	Jamestown, North Dakota
16	(United States)	Arthur Forman		G				Wahpeton, North Dakota
16	(United States)	Robert Dorsher		D			1927-08-20	Grand Forks, North Dakota
20	(United States)	James Leigh		F				Grand Forks, North Dakota
23	(United States)	Jim Dwyer		F				Grand Forks, North Dakota
23	(United States)	Orval Nord		F			1922-05-15	Detroit Lakes, Minnesota
24	(United States)	John Donovan		D			1922-05-15	St. Paul, Minnesota
26	(United States)	John Healy		F				Grand Forks, North Dakota
29	(United States)	Duane Hagness		F			1927-04-14	Grand Forks, North Dakota
35	(United States)	James South		F				Fargo, North Dakota
37	(United States)	Robert Grina	Sophomore	F			1926-08-09	Grand Forks, North Dakota

== Standings ==
1946–47 College ice hockey standings
	Intercollegiate							Overall					
	GP	W	L	T	Pct.	GF	GA	GP	W	L	T	GF	GA
Army	–	–	–	–	–	–	–	14	4	9	1	64	72
Boston College	–	–	–	–	–	–	–	19	15	3	1	139	63
Boston University	19	14	4	1	.763	159	80	21	15	5	1	170	94
Bowdoin	–	–	–	–	–	–	–	11	3	8	0	–	–
Clarkson	–	–	–	–	–	–	–	15	7	7	1	75	79
Colby	–	–	–	–	–	–	–	–	–	–	–	–	–
Colgate	–	–	–	–	–	–	–	14	14	0	0	–	–
Colorado College	–	–	–	–	–	–	–	19	14	5	0	–	–
Cornell	4	0	4	0	.000	5	37	4	0	4	0	5	37
Dartmouth	–	–	–	–	–	–	–	20	16	2	2	152	54
Fort Devens State	–	–	–	–	–	–	–	–	–	–	–	–	–
Georgetown	–	–	–	–	–	–	–	–	–	–	–	–	–
Hamilton	–	–	–	–	–	–	–	10	4	5	1	–	–
Harvard	–	–	–	–	–	–	–	12	6	6	0	–	–
Holy Cross	–	–	–	–	–	–	–	–	–	–	–	–	–
Lehigh	3	0	3	0	.000	3	21	5	0	5	0	9	41
Michigan	–	–	–	–	–	–	–	21	13	7	1	111	76
Michigan Tech	–	–	–	–	–	–	–	19	6	13	0	–	–
Middlebury	–	–	–	–	–	–	–	10	7	2	1	–	–
Minnesota	–	–	–	–	–	–	–	20	12	5	3	–	–
MIT	–	–	–	–	–	–	–	9	5	4	0	–	–
New Hampshire	–	–	–	–	–	–	–	5	4	1	0	28	19
North Dakota	–	–	–	–	–	–	–	13	7	6	0	56	50
Northeastern	–	–	–	–	–	–	–	14	5	9	0	–	–
Norwich	–	–	–	–	–	–	–	8	4	4	0	–	–
Penn State	2	0	2	0	.000	3	26	3	0	3	0	7	37
Princeton	–	–	–	–	–	–	–	13	6	6	1	–	–
Saint Michael's	–	–	–	–	–	–	–	–	–	–	–	–	–
St. Lawrence	–	–	–	–	–	–	–	6	3	3	0	–	–
Tufts	–	–	–	–	–	–	–	–	–	–	–	–	–
Williams	–	–	–	–	–	–	–	9	2	7	0	–	–
Yale	–	–	–	–	–	–	–	22	15	6	1	–	–

== Schedule and results ==
Date	Opponent	Site	Result	Record
Regular Season
January 6	St. Cloud Teachers*	Winter Sports Building • Grand Forks, North Dakota	L 1–8	0–1–0
January 18	Fargo Flyers*	Fargo, North Dakota	W 5–1	1–1–0
January 19	Northwest Agricultural College*	Winter Sports Building • Grand Forks, North Dakota	W 10–1	2–1–0
January 20	Fargo Flyers*	Winter Sports Building • Grand Forks, North Dakota	L 1–2	2–2–0
February 10	Crookston Catholic High School*	Winter Sports Building • Grand Forks, North Dakota	W 3–2	3–2–0
February 12	Northwest Agricultural College*	Winter Sports Building • Grand Forks, North Dakota	W 9–3	4–2–0
February 13	Crookston Catholic High School*	Crookston, Minnesota	L 1–2	4–3–0
February 19	Fargo Flyers*	Winter Sports Building • Grand Forks, North Dakota	W 3–2	5–3–0
Bottineau Tournament
February 22	Fargo Independents*	Bottineau, North Dakota	L 3–9	5–4–0
February 23	Bottineau Independents*	Bottineau, North Dakota	W 7–4	6–4–0
Regular Season
February 28	Grand Forks Legion*	Winter Sports Building • Grand Forks, North Dakota	W 4–3	7–4–0
March 1	Grand Forks Legion*	Winter Sports Building • Grand Forks, North Dakota	L 2–5	7–5–0
March 5	Grand Forks Legion*	Winter Sports Building • Grand Forks, North Dakota	L 7–8	7–6–0
*Non-conference game. Source:
