= John Sherf =

American ice hockey player

- Born: April 8, 1913 Calumet, Michigan, United States
- Died: August 19, 1991 (aged 78) Dearborn, Michigan, United States
- Height: 5 ft 11 in (180 cm)
- Weight: 178 lb (81 kg; 12 st 10 lb)
- Position: Left wing
- Shot: Left
- Played for: Detroit Red Wings
- Playing career: 1935–1944

John Harold Sherf (April 8, 1913 – August 19, 1991) was an American ice hockey player. He played 19 games in the National Hockey League with the Detroit Red Wings between 1936 and 1943. The rest of his career, which lasted from 1935 to 1944, was mainly spent in the American Hockey League. Sherf won the Stanley Cup in 1937 with Detroit, and is the second U.S. citizen to have his name engraved on the Cup.

The first American to have his name engraved on the Stanley Cup, also from Michigan’s upper peninsula, was Clarence “Taffy” Abel of Sault Ste. Marie, who played for the NHL champion New York Rangers in 1928 and Chicago Blackhawks in 1934. His name is engraved on the Stanley Cup with his teammates on those teams.

== Biography ==
Sherf was born and spent his childhood years in Calumet, Michigan in the state's Upper Peninsula. He participated in youth ice hockey, which was popular in the cold climate of the area. By the time he graduated from Calumet High School his hockey skills were widely recognized. In the working class area where he was raised, he was destined to go to work in the copper mines in the area, continuing his hockey career in the local semi-professional leagues. A local physician took an interest in Sherf and provided him with a scholarship to attend the University of Michigan in Ann Arbor.

Sherf attended Michigan from 1932 until 1936, majoring in history and playing hockey on the varsity team during all four years. John played hockey at Calumet High School and for the semi-pro Calumet Black Hawks before enrolling at Michigan. He played center at U of M for three seasons. No records are available for 1933–34. John was the leading scorer in the 1934–35 season with 23 goals and 14 assists in 16 games. In 1935–36, he was the leading scorer of the Western Conference with 33 goals and 10 assists in 17 games. That year, Michigan's opponents scored a combined total of only 30 goals. During his senior year Sherf was elected captain of the hockey team and later selected for the prominent senior men's honorary society, Michigauma. The honorary society was based on local American Indian traditions and each inductee was given an Indian name consistent with his college activities in the induction ceremony. Sherf's Michigauma name was "Flashing Feet Sherf", noting his skill as a hockey player.

Sherf graduated from Michigan with a BA in History in June, 1936. He married Mary Gaecke in Chicago, Illinois in about 1938. They had one son, John Paul Sherf.

Sherf first worked for Ford Motor Company as a summer employee during his college years, working at the 1933 Century of Progress World's Fair in Chicago. He continued his employment with Ford during the off-seasons of his professional hockey career. Following his retirement from professional hockey he returned to Ford to work full-time. During his early years with Ford, he attended Wayne State University in Detroit where he earned a Master of Business Administration degree. Sherf finished his career with Ford as a senior executive in the Manufacturing Division.

Sherf served as national President of the University of Michigan M Club (alumni letterwinners) and the Detroit Red Wings Alumni Association. The University of Michigan selected Sherf as a member of their Athletic Hall of Honor in 1981, only the second Michigan hockey player so honored. Sherf was also elected to the Upper Peninsula (Michigan) Hall of Fame. He also served for more than two decades on the board of directors of Presbyterian Villages of Michigan.

== Athletic career ==
Before he was awarded his degree at the annual commencement ceremony, he was signed to a contract by the Detroit Red Wings of the National Hockey League (NHL). He played several games at the end of the 1935–36 season with the Red Wings top farm team, the Detroit Olympics. He was also called up to play with the Red Wings during the Stanley Cup playoffs that season. The 1936–37 season was Sherf's most memorable as a professional. He played with the American Hockey League's Pittsburgh Hornets, after the Detroit Olympics were moved to Pittsburgh and renamed. At the end of the 1936–37 season Sherf was called up by the Red Wings for the playoffs to help defend their Stanley Cup championship. He collected one point in five games as the Red Wings won their second straight Stanley Cup by beating the New York Rangers three games to two. He was the first American citizen to be a member of an NHL playoff championship team, having his name engraved on the Stanley Cup as a member of the champion Detroit Red Wings.

Johnny Sherf continued his professional hockey career until 1944. He was a member of the Detroit Red Wings for his entire career but was often assigned to the top Red Wings farm team, the Pittsburgh Hornets. Sherf gained recognition both with the Red Wings as well as the Hornets. Because of his skating speed, he was often re-called to the Red Wings to participate in the annual NHL skills competitions. During his career he won the competition as the fastest skater in the NHL. He was also selected as a member of the American Hockey League all-star team representing the Pittsburgh Hornets. Sherf is still the seventh leading scorer in the history of the Pittsburgh Hornets, scoring 94 goals and 121 assists in 301 games played. After being called for military service in 1943, he returned to the Red Wings in 1944 before retiring from professional hockey.

== Career statistics ==
=== Regular season and playoffs ===
			Regular season					Playoffs
Season	Team	League	GP	G	A	Pts	PIM	GP	G	A	Pts	PIM
1930–31	Calumet High School	HS-MI	—	—	—	—	—	—	—	—	—	—
1931–32	University of Michigan	NCAA	—	—	—	—	—	—	—	—	—	—
1932–33	University of Michigan	NCAA	—	—	—	—	—	—	—	—	—	—
1933–34	University of Michigan	NCAA	16	23	14	37	—	—	—	—	—	—
1934–35	University of Michigan	NCAA	17	33	10	43	—	—	—	—	—	—
1935–36	Detroit Red Wings	NHL	1	0	0	0	0	—	—	—	—	—
1935–36	Detroit Olympics	IHL	39	10	7	17	38	6	1	2	3	7
1936–37	Detroit Red Wings	NHL	1	0	0	0	0	5	0	1	1	2
1936–37	Pittsburgh Hornets	IAHL	48	7	11	18	36	4	1	0	1	2
1937–38	Detroit Red Wings	NHL	6	0	0	0	2	—	—	—	—	—
1937–38	Pittsburgh Hornets	IAHL	18	2	8	10	6	—	—	—	—	—
1937–38	Philadelphia Ramblers	IAHL	20	5	7	12	2	5	1	1	2	6
1938–39	Detroit Red Wings	NHL	3	0	0	0	0	3	0	0	0	0
1938–39	Pittsburgh Hornets	IAHL	54	18	22	40	26	—	—	—	—	—
1939–40	Pittsburgh Hornets	IAHL	55	20	15	35	38	9	1	4	5	2
1940–41	Pittsburgh Hornets	AHL	54	21	14	35	31	6	1	3	4	2
1941–42	Pittsburgh Hornets	AHL	56	19	37	56	10	—	—	—	—	—
1943–44	Detroit Red Wings	NHL	8	0	0	0	6	—	—	—	—	—
IAHL/AHL totals			305	92	114	206	149	24	4	8	12	12
NHL totals			19	0	0	0	8	8	0	1	1	2

== See also ==
- University of Michigan Athletic Hall of Honor
