= 1930–31 Harvard Crimson men's ice hockey season =

College ice hockey season

- Conference: Independent
- Home ice: Boston Garden

Record
- Overall: 11–2–0
- Home: 4–1–0
- Road: 3–1–0
- Neutral: 4–0–0

Coaches and captains
- Head coach: Joseph Stubbs
- Assistant coaches: Clark Hodder; Charles Lakin
- Captain: Harwood Ellis

The 1930–31 Harvard Crimson men's ice hockey season was the 33rd season of play for the program. The team represented Harvard University and was coached by Joseph Stubbs in his 4th season.

== Season ==
The defending intercollegiate co-champions began their season with 75 men trying out for the team. After coach Stubbs whittled the team down to size, the Crimson debuted against MIT and won comfortably, 7–2. After the game the team took a few weeks off before reprising their annual meeting with Toronto at Madison Square Garden. This time the Crimson came away victorious and then embarked on a road trip to Canada. They trounced Michigan 7–0 and then won a close victory over McGill to keep their record unblemished. On their way home, Harvard stopped in Syracuse for another victory.

The Crimson had a busy week, playing at home for a match before hitting the road and then returning for the final before breaking for examinations. In the three games the Crimson didn't allow a single goal and scored 25 times to push their record to a perfect 8–0. They played their first game at Army's new rink and faced Middlebury for the first time in program history.

After a month off, Harvard returned to the ice against Dartmouth. The time off looked to have dulled the Crimson but the team still managed to win 4–2. After a close shave in the rematch in Hanover, the team headed to Canada a second time to visit McGill. team captain Harwood Ellis led Harvard to its fifth shutout of the season and returned home with a sterling 11–0 record. The Crimson were set to face Yale to end the year, with neither team having lost a single intercollegiate game, and the winner would be crowned the Eastern Intercollegiate Champion. The vaunted Harvard offense that existed before the extended break never materialized. The Crimson scored once in each of the two games against Yale and the team had to resign itself to second-best in 1931.

== Roster ==
| No. | Nat. | Player | Class | Pos | Height | Weight | DoB | Hometown | Previous team |
|---|---|---|---|---|---|---|---|---|---|
| | | Ian Baldwin | Sophomore | C/LW |
| | | G. M. Hale | Sophomore | G |
| | | S. L. Batchelder | Senior | D |
| | | Wilson H. Crosby | Junior | D |
| | | Charles C. Cunningham | Junior | D/RW |
| | | Harwood Ellis (C) | Senior | G |
| | | Horace D. Everett | Senior | LW |
| | | Channing Frothingham Jr. | Senior | F |
| | (United States) | John B. Garrison | Senior | C | | | 1909-02-13 | West Newton, Massachusetts |
| | | Matthew Hale | Junior | G |
| | | Francis A. Martin | Junior | LW |
| | | Caswell E. MacGregor Jr. | Sophomore | D |
| | | Potter Palmer III | Junior | D |
| | | Clarence C. Pell Jr. | Sophomore | RW |
| | | John W. Putnam | Sophomore | C |
| | | Robert Saltonstall Jr. | Sophomore | RW |
| | | Edward K. Straus | Senior | F |
| | | Edward E. Wendell | Junior | G |
| | | Samuel H. Wolcott Jr. | Sophomore | LW |
| | | W. Barry Wood Jr. | Junior | C |

== Standings ==
1930–31 Eastern Collegiate ice hockey standings
| | Intercollegiate | | | | | | | Overall | | | | | |
| | GP | W | L | T | Pct. | GF | GA | GP | W | L | T | GF | GA |
|---|---|---|---|---|---|---|---|---|---|---|---|---|---|
| Amherst | 9 | 1 | 8 | 0 | .111 | 19 | 42 | 9 | 1 | 8 | 0 | 19 | 42 |
| Army | 12 | 5 | 7 | 0 | .417 | 39 | 34 | 13 | 5 | 8 | 0 | 44 | 41 |
| Bates | 10 | 5 | 5 | 0 | .500 | 23 | 31 | 10 | 5 | 5 | 0 | 23 | 31 |
| Boston University | 8 | 4 | 4 | 0 | .500 | 22 | 30 | 12 | 6 | 6 | 0 | 28 | 41 |
| Bowdoin | 8 | 2 | 6 | 0 | .250 | 19 | 31 | 8 | 2 | 6 | 0 | 19 | 31 |
| Brown | 10 | 9 | 1 | 0 | .900 | 42 | 19 | 10 | 9 | 1 | 0 | 42 | 19 |
| Clarkson | 5 | 4 | 1 | 0 | .800 | 15 | 9 | 12 | 11 | 1 | 0 | 63 | 20 |
| Colby | – | – | – | – | – | – | – | 10 | 3 | 7 | 0 | 28 | 47 |
| Colgate | 4 | 1 | 3 | 0 | .250 | 9 | 14 | 4 | 1 | 3 | 0 | 9 | 14 |
| Connecticut Agricultural | 3 | 1 | 1 | 1 | .500 | 4 | 11 | 3 | 1 | 1 | 1 | 4 | 11 |
| Cornell | 5 | 3 | 2 | 0 | .600 | 18 | 15 | 5 | 3 | 2 | 0 | 18 | 15 |
| Dartmouth | 13 | 5 | 8 | 0 | .385 | 46 | 39 | 13 | 5 | 8 | 0 | 46 | 39 |
| Hamilton | 8 | 6 | 1 | 1 | .813 | 30 | 16 | 9 | 7 | 1 | 1 | 32 | 17 |
| Harvard | 9 | 7 | 2 | 0 | .778 | 41 | 14 | 15 | 12 | 3 | 0 | 66 | 21 |
| Massachusetts Agricultural | 12 | 9 | 3 | 0 | .750 | 51 | 21 | 12 | 9 | 3 | 0 | 51 | 21 |
| Middlebury | 10 | 6 | 3 | 1 | .650 | 45 | 21 | 10 | 6 | 3 | 1 | 45 | 21 |
| MIT | 8 | 1 | 7 | 0 | .125 | 12 | 32 | 8 | 1 | 7 | 0 | 12 | 32 |
| New Hampshire | 12 | 7 | 5 | 0 | .583 | 34 | 22 | 12 | 7 | 5 | 0 | 34 | 22 |
| Northeastern | 11 | 4 | 6 | 1 | .409 | 28 | 29 | 11 | 4 | 6 | 1 | 28 | 29 |
| Norwich | 4 | 0 | 4 | 0 | .000 | 1 | 23 | 4 | 0 | 4 | 0 | 1 | 23 |
| Princeton | 15 | 11 | 4 | 0 | .733 | 48 | 39 | 19 | 14 | 5 | 0 | 74 | 50 |
| Rensselaer | 4 | 0 | 4 | 0 | .000 | 6 | 20 | 4 | 0 | 4 | 0 | 6 | 20 |
| St. Stephen's | 8 | 1 | 6 | 1 | .188 | 8 | 48 | 8 | 1 | 6 | 1 | 8 | 48 |
| Union | 7 | 2 | 4 | 1 | .357 | 19 | 23 | 7 | 2 | 4 | 1 | 19 | 23 |
| Vermont | 8 | 3 | 4 | 1 | .438 | 24 | 32 | 8 | 3 | 4 | 1 | 24 | 32 |
| Villanova | 0 | 0 | 0 | 0 | – | 0 | 0 | 9 | 3 | 6 | 0 | 34 | 59 |
| Wesleyan | 2 | 0 | 2 | 0 | .000 | 1 | 13 | 2 | 0 | 2 | 0 | 1 | 13 |
| Williams | 13 | 6 | 6 | 1 | .500 | 28 | 35 | 13 | 6 | 6 | 1 | 28 | 35 |
| Yale | 10 | 10 | 0 | 0 | 1.000 | 50 | 10 | 16 | 14 | 1 | 1 | 67 | 19 |

== Schedule and results ==
| Date | Opponent | Site | Result | Record |
Regular Season
| December 11 | MIT* | Boston Garden • Boston, Massachusetts | W 7–2 | 1–0–0 |
| December 17 | University Club of Boston* | Boston Garden • Boston, Massachusetts | W 3–1 | 2–0–0 |
| December 27 | vs. Toronto* | Madison Square Garden • Manhattan, New York | W 4–1 | 3–0–0 |
| December 30 | vs. Michigan* | Peace Bridge Arena • Fort Erie, Ontario | W 7–0 | 4–0–0 |
| January 1 | vs. McGill* | Peace Bridge Arena • Fort Erie, Ontario | W 3–2 | 5–0–0 |
| January 2 | vs. Queen's* | State Fair Coliseum • Syracuse, New York | W 5–1 | 6–0–0 |
| January 7 | Toronto* | Boston Garden • Boston, Massachusetts | W 9–0 | 7–0–0 |
| January 10 | at Army* | USMA Rink • West Point, New York | W 10–0 | 8–0–0 |
| January 14 | Middlebury* | Boston Garden • Boston, Massachusetts | W 6–0 | 9–0–0 |
| February 11 | at University Club of Boston* | Boston Arena • Boston, Massachusetts | L 1–2 | 9–1–0 |
| February 14 | Dartmouth* | Boston Garden • Boston, Massachusetts | W 4–2 | 10–1–0 |
| February 21 | at Dartmouth* | Davis Rink • Hanover, New Hampshire | W 3–2 | 11–1–0 |
| February 23 | at McGill* | Montreal Forum • Montreal, Quebec | W 2–0 | 12–1–0 |
| February 28 | Yale* | Boston Garden • Boston, Massachusetts (Rivalry) | L 1–5 | 12–2–0 |
| March 7 | at Yale* | New Haven Arena • New Haven, Connecticut (Rivalry) | L 1–3 | 12–3–0 |
*Non-conference game.
