= 1930–31 Clarkson Golden Knights men's ice hockey season =

Intercollegiate hockey season

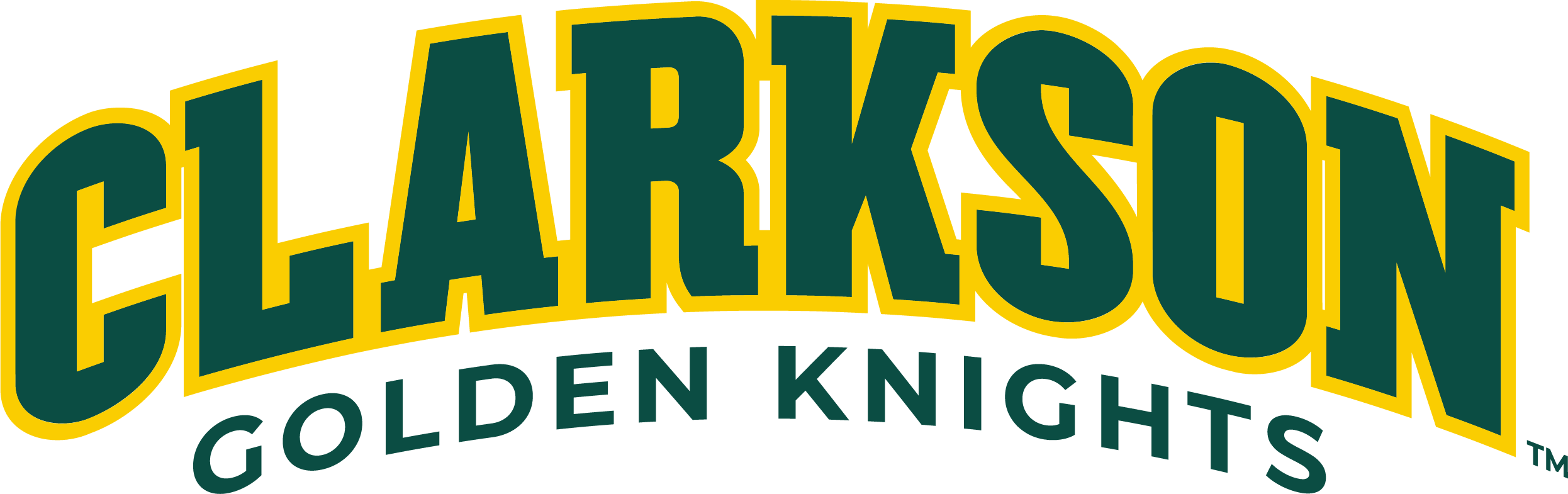
- Home ice: Ives Park

Record
- Overall: 9–1–0
- Home: 5–0–0
- Road: 4–1–0

Coaches and captains
- Head coach: Jack Roos

The 1930–31 Clarkson Golden Knights men's ice hockey season was the 11th season of play for the program. The team was coached by Jack Roos in his 2nd season.

== Season ==
With Clarkson having established itself as one of, if not the, best team in the country outside of the 'Big Four', Tech was able to schedule games against three of college hockey's elites this season. The only missing team from their slate was Harvard and despite rumors to the contrary, the two wouldn't until 1935. Clarkson didn't lose any players to graduation and were expected to be even better this season. Early on, however, injuries and departures left their offense struggling. While the first scheduled game of the season, a match against Loyola, was cancelled, the meeting with Victoria College was able to be played. Without Guest, Levia and Bob Houston, the team's offense looked strong but disjointed, failing to score on several early opportunities. The same could not be said for the defense, which was as stout as it had ever been. Wally Easton earned his first shutout of the season and Clarkson started off the year with a win.

The team then headed south for a swing through southern New England. The first match came against Princeton, who had already compiled a record of 9–1 and were in the running for the national championship. The game was filled with penalties but the defenses for both teams were all but impenetrable. Clarence 'Ike' Houston scored a shorthanded marker near the end of the first and Easton turned aside shot after shot for the remainder of the game. Despite a furious attack from the Tigers, Houston's goal stood as the game-winner and Easton earned a second shutout. Two nights later the team was in Williamstown and had another game slowed by infractions. Easton, however, was equal to the task once more and posted his third goose egg and set a program record for consecutive shutouts that still stands (as of 2021).

For the fourth game of the season, the Knights faces defending national champion Yale. With the way the early part of the season was shaping up, it could possibly decide the eastern intercollegiate championship. Unfortunately for Clarkson, they were completely outplayed by the Elis. The team appeared disorganized and allowed 4 goals to the Bulldogs while their offense was nonexistent. Even late in the game, with Yale down two players, Clarkson was unable to find the back of the net and were themselves shutout for the first time in over 5 years.

The loss seemed to awaken Clarkson's offense from its slumber. While swapping Moore and Guest in as the starting defenseman, the Knights scored 14 goals in two home games against Canadian teams and continued to score for the remainder of the season. 'Peck' Donald was particularly strong during this time, leading the attack from his center position. The match against Dartmouth was more lopsided than expected, not least of which because the Indians were weaker than anticipated this season. This time Ike Houston was the star, netting 4 goals in the game.

Back home, the team found the weather to be freezing, which was good for their ice conditions, but bad for attendance. The sub-zero weather didn't harm the on-ice product, however, and Clarkson kept rolling with wins over St. Patrick's (of Ottawa) and the Ottawa Gee-Gees. The team ended its official season with a road match at Ithaca. On one of the rare occasions that Beebe Lake had good playing ice, Clarkson knocked off Cornell with Donald scoring a hat-trick. The following weekend, the team assembled for an exhibition match against an All-Star squad at the Syracuse Coliseum.

The loss to Yale may have prevented the team from earning its first national championship, however, Clarkson was in a dead heat with Harvard for the runner-up position.

Bernard LaRue served as team manager for the season with Donald Orton as his assistant.

== Roster ==
No.	Nat.	Player	Class	Pos	Height	Weight	DoB	Hometown	Previous team
		Louis Boyle	Sophomore	D
	(Canada)	John Burke	Senior	F				London, Ontario
	(Canada)	C. Gordon Donald	Junior	F				Carleton Place, Ontario
	(Canada)	Wallace Easton	Senior	G				Renfrew, Ontario
	(Canada)	Wilbur Guest	Senior	D				Renfrew, Ontario
	(Canada)	Clarence Houston	Junior	F				Arnprior, Ontario
	(Canada)	Quain McCarry	Junior	D				Montreal, Quebec
	(Canada)	Robert McNab	Freshman	F				Douglas, Ontario
	(Canada)	Robert Moore	Sophomore	D				Renfrew, Ontario

== Standings ==
1930–31 Eastern Collegiate ice hockey standings
	Conference							Overall					
	GP	W	L	T	Pct.	GF	GA	GP	W	L	T	GF	GA
Amherst	–	–	–	–	–	–	–	7	1	6	0	–	–
Army	–	–	–	–	–	–	–	10	4	6	0	37	34
Bates	–	–	–	–	–	–	–	–	–	–	–	–	–
Boston University	8	4	4	0	.500	22	30	12	6	6	0	28	41
Bowdoin	–	–	–	–	–	–	–	8	2	6	0	–	–
Brown	–	–	–	–	–	–	–	10	9	1	0	–	–
Clarkson	5	4	1	0	.800	15	9	10	9	1	0	42	15
Colgate	–	–	–	–	–	–	–	3	1	2	0	–	–
Cornell	5	3	2	0	.600	18	15	5	3	2	0	18	15
Dartmouth	–	–	–	–	–	–	–	13	5	8	0	46	39
Hamilton	–	–	–	–	–	–	–	9	7	1	1	–	–
Harvard	8	6	2	0	.750	39	14	13	11	2	0	62	18
Massachusetts Agricultural	–	–	–	–	–	–	–	13	9	4	0	–	–
Middlebury	–	–	–	–	–	–	–	10	6	3	1	–	–
MIT	–	–	–	–	–	–	–	9	2	7	0	–	–
New Hampshire	–	–	–	–	–	–	–	12	7	5	0	34	22
Northeastern	–	–	–	–	–	–	–	11	4	6	1	–	–
Norwich	–	–	–	–	–	–	–	4	0	4	0	–	–
Princeton	–	–	–	–	–	–	–	19	14	5	0	–	–
Rensselaer	–	–	–	–	–	–	–	4	0	4	0	–	–
St. John's	–	–	–	–	–	–	–	–	–	–	–	–	–
Swarthmore	–	–	–	–	–	–	–	–	–	–	–	–	–
Union	–	–	–	–	–	–	–	7	2	4	1	–	–
Villanova	1	0	1	0	.000	2	6	9	3	6	0	34	59
Williams	–	–	–	–	–	–	–	13	6	6	1	–	–
Yale	–	–	–	–	–	–	–	17	15	1	1	–	–

== Schedule and results ==
Date	Opponent	Site	Result	Record
Regular season
January 8	Victoria*	Ives Park • Potsdam, New York	W 3–0	1–0–0
January 14	at Princeton*	Hobey Baker Memorial Rink • Princeton, New Jersey	W 1–0	2–0–0
January 16	at Williams*	Weston Field Rink • Williamstown, Massachusetts	W 3–0	3–0–0
January 21	at Yale*	New Haven Arena • New Haven, Connecticut	L 0–4	3–1–0
January 23	Ashbury*	Ives Park • Potsdam, New York	W 6–1	4–1–0
January 28	Chesterville*	Ives Park • Potsdam, New York	W 8–2	5–1–0
February 4	at Dartmouth*	Davis Rink • Hanover, New Hampshire	W 6–3	6–1–0
February 14	St. Patrick's H.C.*	Ives Park • Potsdam, New York	W 4–2	7–1–0
February 20	at Prescott H.C.*	Prescott Arena • Prescott, Ontario	W 8–5	8–1–0
February 21	Ottawa*	Ives Park • Potsdam, New York	W 6–1	9–1–0
February 28	at Cornell*	Beebe Lake • Ithaca, New York	W 5–2	10–1–0
March 6	at Syracuse All-Stars*	Syracuse Coliseum • Syracuse, New York	W 13–0	11–1–0
*Non-conference game.

== Scoring Statistics ==
Name	Position	Games	Goals	Assists	Points
Ike Houston	RW	10	19	2	21
Gordon Donald	C	10	15	7	21
Johnny Burke	LW	10	1	4	5
Louis Boyle	D	9	3	0	3
Bill Guest	D	9	2	0	2
Quain McCarry	D	10	2	0	2
Bob McNab	W	10	0	1	1
Bob Moore	D	10	0	1	1
Wally Easton	G	10	0	0	0
Total			42	15	57

Note: Assists were recorded, however, not all assists were reported. The actual assist total is likely much higher than what appears in the boxscores.

== Goaltending statistics ==
Name	Games	Minutes	Wins	Losses	Ties	Goals against	Shut outs	GAA
Wally Easton	10	600	9	1	0	15	3	1.50

Note: GAA is based upon 60 minutes per game.
