= 1932–33 Marquette Hilltoppers men's ice hockey season =

American college hockey season

- Conference: Independent
- Home ice: Hilltop Rink

Record
- Overall: 8–3–1
- Home: 1–0–0
- Road: 4–3–1
- Neutral: 3–0–0

Coaches and captains
- Head coach: Harold Garry
- Captain: Oscar Wettlaufer

The 1932–33 Marquette Hilltoppers men's ice hockey season was the 11th season of play for the program.

== Season ==
Harold Garry, the former coach and captain of the Blue and Gold, returned after finishing up his doctoral studies and led the Hilltoppers in their hour of need. Marquette was suffering through yet another warm winter, preventing the team from getting any practice time throughout the season. During the winter break, coach Garry took part of the team up to Big Cedar Lake and won two games against amateur clubs on the same day. After the break ended the full roster of players headed to the lake and got their first real playing time together. A week later the team dominated the Janesville city team but the Hilltoppers were unable to take advantage of their success due to a complete lack of ice.

Eventually the team headed north at the beginning of February and played games on four consecutive days. The teamwork was a bit lacking but the Hilltoppers managed a draw in the first game before splitting a pair of games against Michigan Tech. The second game highlighted what Marquette could have been that season with a hat-trick from Finkbeiner and 36 saves from Thompson. After finishing the northern swing with two wins, the team returned home to find that winter had finally come to Milwaukee. The team played their only home game of the season against long-time rival Wisconsin and were then forced back onto the road when the ice began to melt.

The Hilltoppers won against a hand-picked team from Green Bay and DePere but could get no playing time before their final games at Ann Arbor. Michigan was a strong team that season, having won four of their previous five games, and overwhelmed the hamstrung Blue and Gold. The team was out of sorts in both games and were soundly defeated, putting an end to any possible claim they had for a championship. "Ozzie" Wettlaufer ended the season leading the team with 13 goals and 23 points.

After the season, there was hope that the team would be able to continue but, after an even warmer winter for 1933–34, the entire season was cancelled and the program was mothballed.

== Roster ==
No.	Nat.	Player	Class	Pos	Height	Weight	DoB	Hometown	Previous team
	(Canada)	Goldwyn W. Draper	Senior					Elgin, Manitoba
	(Canada)	George L. Finkbeiner	Junior	F				Listowel, Ontario
	(Canada)	Kenneth Hood	Junior	F/D				Calgary, Alberta
	(Canada)	Harry J. McCann	Senior	F				Sydney, Nova Scotia
	(Canada)	William J. McIntyre	Junior	F				Listowel, Ontario
		Archibald Nicholson		F/D
	(United States)	Donald A. Olson	Junior	F				Duluth, Minnesota
	(United States)	Arthur Peterson		D				Duluth, Minnesota
	(Canada)	Earl J. Thompson	Junior	G				Caron, Saskatchewan
	(United States)	Donald F. Underhill	Senior					Duluth, Minnesota
		Oscar Wettlaufer (C)		F

== Standings ==
1932–33 Western Collegiate ice hockey standings
	Intercollegiate							Overall					
	GP	W	L	T	Pct.	GF	GA	GP	W	L	T	GF	GA
Alaska Agricultural	–	–	–	–	–	–	–	7	4	3	0	–	–
Marquette	5	2	3	0	.400	13	17	12	8	3	1	55	24
Michigan	11	6	4	1	.591	42	24	16	10	4	2	63	29
Michigan Tech	6	4	2	0	.667	21	19	15	9	5	1	55	35
Minnesota	11	10	1	0	.909	55	10	11	10	1	0	55	10
North Dakota	–	–	–	–	–	–	–	9	1	8	0	–	–
St. Cloud State	7	6	1	0	.857	40	8	11	10	1	0	67	14
Wisconsin	8	0	8	0	.000	3	38	9	0	9	0	5	42

== Schedule and results ==
Date	Opponent	Site	Result	Record
Regular season
December ?	vs. West Bend Legionnaires*	Big Cedar Lake • Big Cedar Lake, Wisconsin	W 7–1	1–0–0
December ?	vs. Watertown A.C.*	Big Cedar Lake • Big Cedar Lake, Wisconsin	W 8–1	2–0–0
January ?	vs. Wausau A.C.*	Big Cedar Lake • Big Cedar Lake, Wisconsin	W 3–1	3–0–0
January ?	at Janesville A.C.*	Janesville, Wisconsin	W 9–0	4–0–0
February 2	at Iron Mountain A.C.*	Michigan	T 1–1	4–0–1
February 3	at Michigan Tech*	Houghton, Michigan ^{†}	L 2–4	4–1–1
February 4	at Michigan Tech*	Houghton, Michigan ^{†}	W 7–2	5–1–1
February 5	at Marinette A.C.*	Marinette, Wisconsin	W 6–1	6–1–1
February 14	Wisconsin*	Hilltop Rink • Milwaukee, Wisconsin	W 2–0	7–1–1
February ?	at Green Bay/DePere A.C.*	Fox River Rink • Green Bay, Wisconsin	W 8–2	8–1–1
March 2	at Michigan*	Weinberg Coliseum • Ann Arbor, Michigan	L 1–5	8–2–1
March 4	at Michigan*	Weinberg Coliseum • Ann Arbor, Michigan	L 1–6	8–3–1
*Non-conference game.

† Michigan Tech lists both games as being played at Milwaukee.
