= 1934–35 Michigan Wolverines men's ice hockey season =

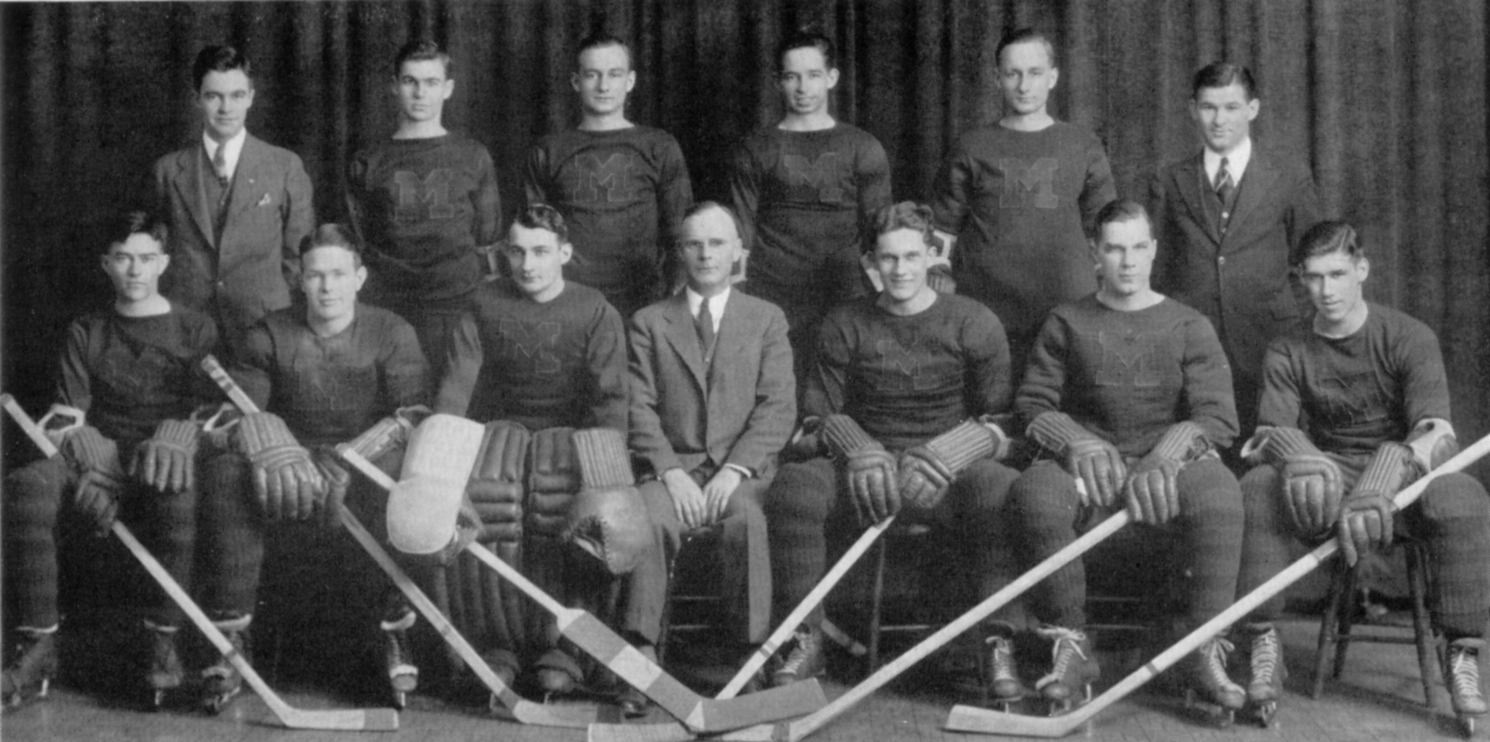

Western Intercollegiate Champions
- Home ice: Ann Arbor Coliseum

Record
- Overall: 12–3–2 (4–0–2 conference)

Coaches and captains
- Head coach: Ed Lowrey
- Captain(s): Johnny Sherf, John Jewell

The 1934–35 Michigan Wolverines men's ice hockey team represented the University of Michigan in college ice hockey. In its eighth year under head coach Ed Lowrey, the team won the Big Ten Conference ice hockey championship, compiled a 12–3–2 record (4–0–2 conference), and outscored all opponents 60 to 30.

Left wing Johnny Sherf and goalie John Jewell were the team's senior co-captains. Jewell left the team during the season for an appendectomy. He was replaced in goal by Bill Chase.

Sherf scored more goals during the 1934–35 season than all of Michigan's opponents combined. He scored four goals in the opening game of the season against the Essex Frontiers. During a two-game series on the road against Minnesota in January 1935, Sherf played the entire 140 minutes of both games (including overtime) "without a penalty and with relief only to change sticks." Sherf later played for the Detroit Red Wings and in 1937 became the first U.S. citizen to have his name engraved on the Stanley Cup. Michigan's sophomore center Vic Heyliger also went on to play for the Chicago Blackhawks and later returned to Ann Arbor as the Wolverine's hockey coach from 1944 to 1957.

With a record of 4–0–2 against Big Ten Conference opponents, the 1934–35 Wolverines won the conference championship, the first conference championship won by a Michigan athletic team since the spring of 1934. After watching Michigan defeat Minnesota on February 23, 1935, to win the conference championship, athletic director Fielding H. Yost said, "Now we've got a championship! Did you see how Sherf outsmarted 'em for the last goal? That boy's a real athlete! A real Meechigan athlete!" The Wolverines broke Minnesota's streak of having won four consecutive Big Ten ice hockey championships.

The Wolverines concluded the season with an 8–3 victory over the St. Thomas Athletic Club. The eight goals in the game was the most scored in "a major game" at the Ann Arbor Coliseum up to that point.

At the end of the season, three Michigan players, left wing Johnny Sherf, center Vic Heyliger, and defenseman Donald MacCollum, were selected to the All-Midwest team.

== Standings ==
1934–35 Western Collegiate ice hockey standings
	Intercollegiate							Overall					
	GP	W	L	T	Pct.	GF	GA	GP	W	L	T	GF	GA
Alaska Agricultural	–	–	–	–	–	–	–	3	2	1	0	–	–
Michigan	10	7	1	2	.800	32	13	17	12	3	2	60	30
Michigan Tech	–	–	–	–	–	–	–	17	4	11	2	–	–
Minnesota	–	–	–	–	–	–	–	17	9	6	2	–	–
St. Cloud State	1	1	0	0	1.000	8	2	27	25	2	0	169	63
Wisconsin	–	–	–	–	–	–	–	11	5	6	0	–	–

== Schedule ==
During the season, Michigan compiled a 12–3–2. Its schedule was as follows.

Date	Opponent	Score	Result	Location
Dec. 5, 1934	Essex Frontiers	6–2	Win	Coliseum, Ann Arbor, MI
Dec. 8, 1934	London Athletic Club	1–3	Loss	Coliseum, Ann Arbor, MI
Dec. 15, 1934	Chatham Maroons	2–3	Loss	Coliseum, Ann Arbor, MI
Dec. 19, 1934	McMaster	6–4	Win	Coliseum, Ann Arbor, MI
Jan. 11, 1935	Wisconsin	6–0	Win	Coliseum, Ann Arbor, MI
Jan. 12, 1935	Wisconsin	2–1	Win	Coliseum, Ann Arbor, MI
Jan. 18, 1935	Minnesota	2–2 (OT)	Tie	Minnesota
Jan. 19, 1935	Minnesota	4–3	Win	Minnesota
Jan. 22, 1935	Point Edward	3–2	Win	Coliseum, Ann Arbor, MI
Feb. 11, 1935	Ontario Agricultural	2–0	Win	Coliseum, Ann Arbor, MI
Feb. 15, 1935	Michigan Tech	2–1 (OT)	Win	Houghton, MI
Feb. 16, 1935	Michigan Tech	2–3	Loss	Houghton, MI
Feb. 22, 1935	Minnesota	1–1	Tie	Coliseum, Ann Arbor, MI
Feb. 23, 1935	Minnesota	3–1	Win	Coliseum, Ann Arbor, MI
March 1, 1935	Michigan Tech	3–0	Win	Coliseum, Ann Arbor, MI
March 2, 1935	Michigan Tech	7–1	Win	Coliseum, Ann Arbor, MI
March 7, 1935	St. Thomas Athletic Club	8–3	Win	Coliseum, Ann Arbor, MI
		60–30	12–3–2	

== Roster and scoring statistics ==
Eight members of the 1934-35 Michigan hockey team received an "M" for their participation on the team. They are indicated in bold below. Two other players, Edward Chase and Jack Merrill received varsity numerals. Sampson J. Smith received the manager's award.

Name	Year	Position	Hometown	Goals	Assists	Pts
**Richard Berryman**	Sophomore	Right wing	Homer, Michigan			
Edward C. Chase	Sophomore		Detroit, Michigan			
**William K. "Bill" Chase**	Sophomore	Goalie	Detroit, Michigan			
**Walter Courtis**	Senior		Detroit, Michigan			
**Lawrence "Larry" David**	Junior	Right defense	Hibbing, Minnesota			
**Vic Heyliger**	Sophomore	Center	Concord, Massachusetts			
**John Jewell**	Senior	Goalie	Calumet, Michigan			
**Donald MacCollum**	Senior	Left defense	Rochester, Michigan			
Gilbert McEachern						
Jack Merrill	Sophomore		Detroit, Michigan			
**John Sherf**	Senior	Left wing	Calumet, Michigan			
Parker Stetson		Defense				
Edward Sullivan		Defense				
				**60**		
