= 1930–31 Villanova Wildcats men's ice hockey season =

- Home ice: Philadelphia Ice Palace

Record
- Overall: 3–6–0
- Home: 2–0–0
- Road: 0–3–0
- Neutral: 1–3–0

Coaches and captains
- Head coach: Edward Hunsinger
- Captain: Bill Orcutt

The 1930–31 Villanova Wildcats men's ice hockey season was the 2nd season of play for the program.

== Season ==
After a winless though not embarrassing inaugural season, Villanova came into the year with an ambitious schedule. Despite scheduling just a few games at the Philadelphia Ice Palace, the Wildcats would attempt to play upwards of a dozen games during their second year. Several players from the previous season were returning, including leading scorer "Eskimo" Kennedy, and the team was helmed by the football team's assistant coach, Ed Hunsinger. To support the young program, 15 full uniforms were available for the players who made the squad from an initial group of 36 candidates.

The Wildcats started the year with a bang, defeating the Williamsport Amateur Club for the program's first win. In the next game, Villanova faced a tough challenge with a professional outfit, Atlantic City Sea Gulls. Nova held firm in the first period, holding the pros to a single goal while Faughnan netted one for the blue and white. After that strong start, however, the defense collapsed and allowed 14 goals in the final 2 periods. There were 2,000 fans in attendance but most were locals cheering for the birds. Villanova had a long layoff before the next match when they resumed their rivalry with the Penn Athletic Club. Unfortunately, the Pennacs continued their winning streak and edged out the Wildcats by a single goal.

The week afterward was supposed to be an especially busy one for the program as they had scheduled 4 games over 7 days, however, due to weather two of those matches were cancelled while a third was rescheduled to a later date. Instead, the team was only able to ply the junior varsity team from Yale and, despite playing the B team, was still unable to get a victory. They kept even with the J.V. squad through two periods but faltered in the last 20 minutes. With their plans disrupted by the weather, Villanova agreed to participate in the opening game at the Hershey Ice Palace on February 18. They held their old rival Penn A. C. to an even score in regulation and necessitated overtime Nova got the first goal, however, because sudden-death rules did not apply to the first two overtime periods, the Pennacs were able to tie the game in the second 5-minute period and require a third overtime. A goal by their arch-nemesis ended the Wildcats' hoped of finally getting over the hump.

A couple of weeks later, Villanova was getting ready to wind down its season with a match against Princeton's J. V. squad. The Wildcats had their best game of the season with Kennedy leading the way. The winger scored 5 goals in the game, setting a program record. Unfortunately, the team could not keep the momentum and were swamped by Swarthmore in the following match. The next contest was the postponed rematch with the Sea Gulls, however, because of scheduling conflicts, the game had to be played in Atlantic City, New Jersey. The pros were just as impressive the second time around and easily downed the Wildcats. While the gave at Atlantic City was supposed to be the season finale, the team managed to shoehorn in one final game against the Lancaster Athletic Club and get their third win of the season.

Bob Rothert and Charlie Lynch served as team managers.

== Roster ==
No.	Nat.	Player	Class	Pos	Height	Weight	DoB	Hometown	Previous team
		Richard Clark
		Joseph Delaney		D
		John Faughnan		RW
		George Golden		W
		Charles Hurlbert		D
		Arthur Kennedy		LW
		John T. Kilcourse	Senior	G
		Joseph Matera
		Hugh McHugh
		Murphy		W
	(United States)	John J. O'Neill	Senior	C				Boston, Massachusetts
		William Orcutt (C)		D
		Arthur Shortall		G
		Albert Trosky
		Theodore Ventura

== Standings ==
1930–31 Eastern Collegiate ice hockey standings
	Conference							Overall					
	GP	W	L	T	Pct.	GF	GA	GP	W	L	T	GF	GA
Amherst	9	1	8	0	.111	19	42	9	1	8	0	19	42
Army	12	5	7	0	.417	39	34	13	5	8	0	44	41
Bates	10	5	5	0	.500	23	31	10	5	5	0	23	31
Boston University	8	4	4	0	.500	22	30	12	6	6	0	28	41
Bowdoin	8	2	6	0	.250	19	31	8	2	6	0	19	31
Brown	10	9	1	0	.900	42	19	10	9	1	0	42	19
Clarkson	5	4	1	0	.800	15	9	12	11	1	0	63	20
Colgate	4	1	3	0	.250	9	14	4	1	3	0	9	14
Connecticut Agricultural	3	1	1	1	.500	4	11	3	1	1	1	4	11
Cornell	5	3	2	0	.600	18	15	5	3	2	0	18	15
Dartmouth	13	5	8	0	.385	46	39	13	5	8	0	46	39
Hamilton	8	6	1	1	.813	30	16	9	7	1	1	32	17
Harvard	9	7	2	0	.778	41	14	15	12	3	0	66	21
Massachusetts Agricultural	12	9	3	0	.750	51	21	12	9	3	0	51	21
Middlebury	10	6	3	1	.650	45	21	10	6	3	1	45	21
MIT	8	1	7	0	.125	12	32	8	1	7	0	12	32
New Hampshire	12	7	5	0	.583	34	22	12	7	5	0	34	22
Northeastern	11	4	6	1	.409	28	29	11	4	6	1	28	29
Norwich	4	0	4	0	.000	1	23	4	0	4	0	1	23
Princeton	15	11	4	0	.733	48	39	19	14	5	0	74	50
Rensselaer	4	0	4	0	.000	6	20	4	0	4	0	6	20
St. Stephen's	8	1	6	1	.188	8	48	–	–	–	–	–	–
Union	7	2	4	1	.357	19	23	7	2	4	1	19	23
Vermont	8	3	4	1	.438	24	32	8	3	4	1	24	32
Villanova	0	0	0	0	–	0	0	9	3	6	0	34	59
Wesleyan	2	0	2	0	.000	1	13	2	0	2	0	1	13
Williams	13	6	6	1	.500	28	35	13	6	6	1	28	35
Yale	10	10	0	0	1.000	50	10	16	14	1	1	67	19

== Schedule and results ==
Date	Opponent	Site	Result	Record
Regular season
January 10	Williamsport Amateur Club*	Philadelphia Ice Palace • Philadelphia, Pennsylvania	W 8–4	1–0–0
January 13	at Atlantic City Sea Gulls*	Boardwalk Hall • Atlantic City, New Jersey	L 2–15	1–1–0
January 30	vs. Penn Athletic Club*	Philadelphia Ice Palace • Philadelphia, Pennsylvania	L 1–2	1–2–0
February 13	at Yale J. V.*	New Haven Arena • New Haven, Connecticut	L 2–6	1–3–0
February 18	vs. Penn Athletic Club*	Hershey Ice Palace • Hershey, Pennsylvania	L 4–5 ^{3OT}	1–4–0
February 27	Princeton J. V.*	Philadelphia Ice Palace • Philadelphia, Pennsylvania	W 7–2	2–4–0
March 1	vs. Swarthmore ^{†}*	Hershey Ice Palace • Hershey, Pennsylvania	L 2–6	2–5–0
March 4	at Atlantic City Sea Gulls*	Boardwalk Hall • Atlantic City, New Jersey	L 2–18	2–6–0
March 13	vs. Lancaster Athletic Club*	Hershey Ice Palace • Hershey, Pennsylvania	W 6–1	3–6–0
*Non-conference game.

† Swarthmore did not support ice hockey as a varsity sport this season.

== Scoring statistics ==
Name	Position	Games	Goals	Assists	Points
Eskimo Kennedy	LW	-	18	-	-
Johnny O'Neill	C	-	5	-	-
Bill Orcutt	D	-	3	-	-
Joe Delaney	D	-	3	-	-
Jackie Faughnan	RW	-	2	-	-
George Golden	W	-	1	-	-
Al Trosky		-	1	-	-
Charlie Hurlbert	D	-	1	-	-
Ted Ventura		-	0	-	-
Joe Matera		-	0	-	-
John Kilcourse	G	-	0	-	-
Artie Shortall	G	-	0	-	-
Total			34	-	-

† Assists were infrequently recorded and/or reported.
