= 1943–44 Penn State Nittany Lions men's ice hockey season =

Record
- Overall: 0–2–0
- Road: 0–2–0

Coaches and captains
- Head coach: Arthur Davis
- Captain: Art Gladstone

The 1943–44 Penn State Nittany Lions men's ice hockey season was the 5th season of play for the program. The Nittany Lions represented Pennsylvania State University and were coached by Arthur Davis in his 4th season.

== Season ==
With only one player returning from the previous year's team (team captain Art Gladstone), the Nittany Lions weren't in any kind of shape to compete against established teams. While the program was finally able to get into games against other varsity teams, they were embarrassed in all of their matches, losing by significant margins each time. because the war was still raging, with no end in sight, Penn State finally bowed to circumstance and suspended the program after the year.

== Roster ==
No.	Nat.	Player	Class	Pos	Height	Weight	DoB	Hometown	Previous team
		Ronald Adams
		P. Ameel
		Charles Blair
		J. Bates
		J. Chapman
		T. Connin
		R. Crawford
		J. Foley
		Art Gladstone (C)
		J. Hutchins
		J. Lafferty
		Richard Nelson
		Frank Rainear
		J. Waslh
		C. Williams

== Standings ==
1943–44 College ice hockey standings
	Intercollegiate							Overall					
	GP	W	L	T	Pct.	GF	GA	GP	W	L	T	GF	GA
Army	–	–	–	–	–	–	–	9	5	4	0	56	38
Clarkson	–	–	–	–	–	–	–	7	0	7	0	15	65
Colgate	–	–	–	–	–	–	–	6	4	2	0	–	–
Cornell	4	1	3	0	.250	10	21	4	1	3	0	10	21
Dartmouth	–	–	–	–	–	–	–	7	7	0	0	93	21
Michigan	–	–	–	–	–	–	–	8	5	3	0	39	31
Minnesota	–	–	–	–	–	–	–	11	6	5	0	–	–
Penn State	2	0	2	0	.000	4	25	2	0	2	0	4	25
Williams	–	–	–	–	–	–	–	3	0	3	0	–	–
Yale	–	–	–	–	–	–	–	5	3	2	0	–	–

== Schedule and results ==
Date	Opponent	Site	Result	Record
Regular season
December 15	at Hershey Jr. Cubs*	Hershey Sports Arena • Hershey, Pennsylvania (Exhibition)	L 4–7	
January 16	vs. Army Air Corps*	? (Exhibition)	L 3–8	
February 5	at Cornell*	Beebe Lake • Ithaca, New York	L 1–7	0–1–0
February 26	at Army*	Smith Rink • West Point, New York	L 3–18	0–2–0
*Non-conference game. ^{#}Rankings from USCHO.com Poll.

== Scoring Statistics ==
Name	Games	Goals	Assists	Points	PIM
Art Gladstone	–	1	–	–	–
Frank Rainear	–	1	–	–	–
Charles Blair	–	1	–	–	–
Richard Nelson	–	1	–	–	–
Total		4			
