= 1943–44 Cornell Big Red men's ice hockey season =

Intercollegiate hockey season

- Home ice: Beebe Lake

Record
- Overall: 1–3–0
- Home: 1–1–0
- Road: 0–2–0

Coaches and captains
- Head coach: Nick Bawlf

The 1943–44 Cornell Big Red men's ice hockey season was the 37th season of play for the program. The team was coached by Nick Bawlf in his 22nd season.

== Season ==
With World War II still raging in Europe and the Pacific, Cornell began the season with a much smaller pool of players than normal. part of the reason was that only two players from last year's team returned for coach Bawlf. The team received a little bit of luck in that Beebe Lake was entirely frozen in early January, allowing the team to not only practice but play a home game for the first time in almost two years. In the end, however, the team's lack of experience and leadership was too much of a hindrance and they lost the opening match of the season to Colgate.

While the team knew their next game was against Army, the Big Red had to wait three weeks to play the match. When they finally got on the ice the Big Red were routed by the Cadets, losing 1–8 in a game that was only that close because of a herculean effort by goaltender Ed Carmen. The team only had to wait a week for the next match and were able to play at home against Penn State. Cornell won its only game on the season against the team, dominating the Nittany Lions 7–1. The next game was a rematch with Colgate and the Raiders again put the clamps on Cornell, this time winning 7–1. The Big Red were hoping to end the season with a second win against Penn State on February 19 but the game was cancelled due to rain.

The team did not name a captain for the season.

== Roster ==
No.	Nat.	Player	Class	Pos	Height	Weight	DoB	Hometown	Previous team
		J. Batt		F
		Bawler		D
		Bryan		G
		Campbell		D
		Ed Carmen		G
		Don Clay		F
	(United States)	Ted Easley		F				Princeton, New Jersey
		Mayers		F
		Mosher		D
		Murray
		Rhodes		F
		Rice		F
		Wolfe		D

== Standings ==
1943–44 College ice hockey standings
	Intercollegiate							Overall					
	GP	W	L	T	Pct.	GF	GA	GP	W	L	T	GF	GA
Army	–	–	–	–	–	–	–	9	5	4	0	56	38
Clarkson	–	–	–	–	–	–	–	7	0	7	0	15	65
Colgate	–	–	–	–	–	–	–	6	4	2	0	–	–
Cornell	4	1	3	0	.250	10	21	4	1	3	0	10	21
Dartmouth	–	–	–	–	–	–	–	7	7	0	0	93	21
Michigan	–	–	–	–	–	–	–	8	5	3	0	39	31
Minnesota	–	–	–	–	–	–	–	11	6	5	0	–	–
Penn State	2	0	2	0	.000	4	25	2	0	2	0	4	25
Williams	–	–	–	–	–	–	–	3	0	3	0	–	–
Yale	–	–	–	–	–	–	–	5	3	2	0	–	–

== Schedule and results ==
Date	Opponent	Site	Result	Record
Regular season
January 8	Colgate*	Beebe Lake • Ithaca, New York	L 1–5	0–1–0
January 29	at Army*	Smith Rink • West Point, New York	L 1–8	0–2–0
February 5	Penn State*	Beebe Lake • Ithaca, New York	W 7–1	1–2–0
February 12	at Colgate*	Hamilton, New York	L 1–7	1–3–0
*Non-conference game.
