= 1935–36 Cornell Big Red men's ice hockey season =

Intercollegiate hockey season

- Home ice: Beebe Lake

Record
- Overall: 1–2–1
- Home: 1–0–0
- Road: 1–2–0

Coaches and captains
- Head coach: Nick Bawlf
- Captain: William Hoyt

The 1935–36 Cornell Big Red men's ice hockey season was the 29th season of play for the program. The teams was coached by Nick Bawlf in his 14th season.

== Season ==
Once again, the ice hockey team was forced to wait until some time in January before they could practice on Beebe Lake. The team got as much training in as they could and met Union for the first game of the season. The Big Red had to come back from a 3–1 deficit in the 3rd to tie the game and no overtime was played to determine the winner.

Cornell had to wait until after the semester break for the second match and they welcomed a familiar face to Ithaca in Colgate. The two played a closely-contested affair but, while Guthrie was sitting in the penalty box, the Red Raiders nabbed the winning goal. Howard "Curly" Dugan played the entire game on defense while brother Sam netted both Big Red goals. A week later the team hit the road and met stiff opposition in the form of Hamilton. The team played well but the offensive attack from the Continentals was just too much for them to handle.

The final game of the season was played against Syracuse after St. Lawrence cancelled its appearance. Several changes to the lineup resulted in Cornell earning its only win on the year. Simpson led the way with a hat-trick while the defense was manned aptly by the Dugan brothers.

== Roster ==
No.	Nat.	Player	Class	Pos	Height	Weight	DoB	Hometown	Previous team
		Adams
	(United States)	Howard Dugan	Senior	D				Hamburg, New York
	(United States)	Sam Dugan	Junior	D/F				Hamburg, New York
	(United States)	Grant Ehrlich		F				Chicago, Illinois
	(United States)	Glen Guthrie	Junior	LW				Ithaca, New York
	(United States)	William Hoyt (C)	Senior	C/LW				Brooklyn, New York
	(United States)	Donald Keeler		G				Tupper Lake, New York
	(United States)	Andrew McElwee		D				Ithaca, New York
	(United States)	Charlie McElwee		F				Ithaca, New York
	(United States)	Myles MacMahon						Montclair, New Jersey
	(United States)	Robert Morton		RW				Duluth, Minnesota
		Harold Nunn		D
		William Simpson		C/RW
		Ken Wilson		F

== Standings ==
1935–36 Eastern Collegiate ice hockey standings
	Intercollegiate							Overall					
	GP	W	L	T	Pct.	GF	GA	GP	W	L	T	GF	GA
Army	–	–	–	–	–	–	–	9	5	4	0	22	31
Boston College	–	–	–	–	–	–	–	12	7	4	1	61	34
Boston University	13	7	6	0	.538	56	58	13	7	6	0	56	58
Bowdoin	–	–	–	–	–	–	–	8	2	6	0	–	–
Brown	–	–	–	–	–	–	–	12	7	5	0	–	–
Clarkson	–	–	–	–	–	–	–	16	13	2	1	103	44
Colgate	–	–	–	–	–	–	–	14	3	10	1	–	–
Cornell	4	1	2	1	.375	13	13	4	1	2	1	13	13
Dartmouth	–	–	–	–	–	–	–	22	16	5	1	123	72
Hamilton	–	–	–	–	–	–	–	8	5	3	0	–	–
Harvard	–	–	–	–	–	–	–	17	12	4	1	–	–
Massachusetts State	–	–	–	–	–	–	–	6	1	4	1	–	–
Middlebury	–	–	–	–	–	–	–	12	5	7	0	–	–
MIT	–	–	–	–	–	–	–	12	2	10	0	–	–
New Hampshire	–	–	–	–	–	–	–	13	7	6	0	58	39
Northeastern	–	–	–	–	–	–	–	8	2	5	1	–	–
Norwich	–	–	–	–	–	–	–	3	0	3	0	–	–
Princeton	–	–	–	–	–	–	–	22	13	8	1	–	–
Syracuse	–	–	–	–	–	–	–	–	–	–	–	–	–
Union	–	–	–	–	–	–	–	8	2	5	1	–	–
Williams	–	–	–	–	–	–	–	9	6	3	0	–	–
Yale	–	–	–	–	–	–	–	18	6	12	0	–	–

== Schedule and results ==
Date	Opponent	Site	Result	Record
Regular season
January 18	Union*	Beebe Lake • Ithaca, New York	T 3–3	0–0–1
February 6	Colgate*	Beebe Lake • Ithaca, New York	L 2–3	0–1–1
February 15	at Hamilton*	Russell Sage Rink • Clinton, New York	L 2–5	0–2–1
February 22	Syracuse*	Beebe Lake • Ithaca, New York	W 6–2	1–2–1
*Non-conference game.
