= 1945–46 Cornell Big Red men's ice hockey season =

Intercollegiate hockey season

- Home ice: Beebe Lake

Record
- Overall: 1–3–0
- Home: 1–0–0
- Road: 0–3–0

Coaches and captains
- Head coach: Nick Bawlf

The 1945–46 Cornell Big Red men's ice hockey season was the 39th season of play for the program. The team had 4 matches, winning at home against Colgate, and losing on the road to Yale, Army, and Colgate. The team was coached by Nick Bawlf in his 24th season.

== Season ==
Cornell opened its first post-war season with a rematch against Yale. The Elis had handled the Big Red in last season's finale and the Cornellians were looking to even the score. Unfortunately, the Big Red were only able to get in 4 days worth of practice prior to the game while Yale had been on the ice for over a month. The Bulldogs embarrassed Cornell in the game, building a 10–2 lead in the first two periods and then tacking on another 8 markers before time was called. It was the second-worst defeat in the history of the program but the team was able to rebound when they played their second game a week later. The team allowed 6 goals in the opening period but seemed to settle down afterwards. Though they lost to the Cadets, the score was much closer at 4–9.

The team returned to Ithaca for their only home game of the year, facing Colgate in the first of a weekend home-and-home series. From the start of the game, Cornell pressed their opponents and hemmed the Red Raiders in their own zone until finally score near the end of the first period. Colgate replied with a strong second frame and tied the score. Bruce Care scored the final goal in the third and earned Cornell its first win in over two years. The effort required to win the match seemed take everything the Big Red had to offer because two night later, Cornell fell to the same Colgate squad 1–9.

The team did not name a captain for the season.

== Roster ==
No.	Nat.	Player	Class	Pos	Height	Weight	DoB	Hometown	Previous team
		Eddie Best		LW
		Bruce Care		RW
		George Ebel
		Hanson		D
		Joseph Harron		D
		Johnson		C
		McEntree		G
		Brendan O'Hara
		Schnideau
		Weber

== Standings ==
1945–46 College ice hockey standings
	Intercollegiate							Overall					
	GP	W	L	T	Pct.	GF	GA	GP	W	L	T	GF	GA
Army	–	–	–	–	–	–	–	13	7	6	0	87	70
Boston College	–	–	–	–	–	–	–	3	1	2	0	3	17
Boston University	3	2	0	1	.833	20	10	3	2	0	1	20	10
Colgate	–	–	–	–	–	–	–	8	2	6	0	–	–
Colorado College	–	–	–	–	–	–	–	11	3	8	0	–	–
Cornell	4	1	3	0	.250	9	37	4	1	3	0	9	37
Dartmouth	–	–	–	–	–	–	–	8	6	2	0	66	28
Gustavus Adolphus	–	–	–	–	–	–	–	10	1	8	1	–	–
Harvard	–	–	–	–	–	–	–	8	2	4	2	–	–
Michigan	–	–	–	–	–	–	–	25	17	7	1	167	104
Michigan Tech	–	–	–	–	–	–	–	16	4	12	0	–	–
Minnesota	–	–	–	–	–	–	–	14	9	4	1	–	–
Princeton	–	–	–	–	–	–	–	4	1	3	0	–	–
St. Olaf	–	–	–	–	–	–	–	4	3	1	0	–	–
Williams	–	–	–	–	–	–	–	5	1	4	0	–	–
Yale	–	–	–	–	–	–	–	8	6	2	0	–	–

== Schedule and results ==
Date	Opponent	Site	Result	Record
Regular Season
January 19	at Yale*	New Haven Arena • New Haven, Connecticut	L 2–18	0–1–0
January 26	at Army*	Smith Rink • West Point, New York	L 4–9	0–2–0
February 7	Colgate*	Beebe Lake • Ithaca, New York	W 2–1	1–2–0
February 10	at Colgate*	Hamilton, New York	L 1–9	1–3–0
*Non-conference game.
