= 1930–31 Cornell Big Red men's ice hockey season =

Intercollegiate hockey season

- Home ice: Beebe Lake

Record
- Overall: 3–2–0
- Home: 2–1–0
- Road: 1–1–0

Coaches and captains
- Head coach: Nick Bawlf
- Captain: Harold Clark

The 1930–31 Cornell Big Red men's ice hockey season was the 26th season of play for the program. The teams was coached by Nick Bawlf in his 11th season.

== Season ==
Cornell began the season having to contend with extended periods of thaw that prevented them from getting much practice in before the winter break. The Big Red were quick out of the gate, winning their first match of the year 7–2. The offense continued to play well in the second game, scoring the first 4-goal against Rensselaer before the Engineers nearly stormed back, ending the match with a 5–3 win.

The team returned after the semester break and picked up right where they left off, winning their third game of the season 4–2. The team suffered a serious loss when their leading goal scorer McKowne was ruled ineligible after the game. captain Clark was shifted to center while Walsh took over on defense. The result was the Big Red got shut out in their next game, ending their winning streak against Williams.

The team recovered for their final game of the season, but still faced a formidable opponent in Clarkson. Cornell lost their last game of the season, but they were still able to finish with a winning record. This was the first time in program history that the Big Red were able to string two winning seasons together. The team wouldn't be able to repeat that feat until 1965.

Owing to the lack of available ice, Cornell was forced to cancel all games over the next two seasons. They finally resumed play in 1934.

== Roster ==
No.	Nat.	Player	Class	Pos	Height	Weight	DoB	Hometown	Previous team
	(United States)	Harold T. Clark (C)	Senior	D/C				Utica, New York
	(United States)	Carleton Cornell		D				Pleasantville, New York
	(United States)	Jack Draney		D/RW				Poughkeepsie, New York
	(United States)	Carleton Endemann	Senior	D				New York, New York
	(United States)	Edward Guthrie	Senior	RW				Ithaca, New York
	(United States)	James McKowne	Junior	C				Buffalo, New York
	(United States)	Richard Nulle						New York, New York
	(United States)	Bill Peace						Philadelphia, Pennsylvania
	(United States)	Gordon Priedeman						Minneapolis, Minnesota
	(United States)	Benjamin Rhodes	Senior	G				Niagara Falls, New York
	(Canada)	Jack Shields	Junior	G				East Gwillimbury, Ontario
	(United States)	Robert Spitzmiller	Senior	LW				Buffalo, New York
	(United States)	Matt Walsh		D/LW				Dorchester, Massachusetts

== Standings ==
1930–31 Eastern Collegiate ice hockey standings
	Conference							Overall					
	GP	W	L	T	Pct.	GF	GA	GP	W	L	T	GF	GA
Amherst	9	1	8	0	.111	19	42	9	1	8	0	19	42
Army	12	5	7	0	.417	39	34	13	5	8	0	44	41
Bates	10	5	5	0	.500	23	31	10	5	5	0	23	31
Boston University	8	4	4	0	.500	22	30	12	6	6	0	28	41
Bowdoin	8	2	6	0	.250	19	31	8	2	6	0	19	31
Brown	10	9	1	0	.900	42	19	10	9	1	0	42	19
Clarkson	5	4	1	0	.800	15	9	12	11	1	0	63	20
Colgate	4	1	3	0	.250	9	14	4	1	3	0	9	14
Connecticut Agricultural	3	1	1	1	.500	4	11	3	1	1	1	4	11
Cornell	5	3	2	0	.600	18	15	5	3	2	0	18	15
Dartmouth	13	5	8	0	.385	46	39	13	5	8	0	46	39
Hamilton	8	6	1	1	.813	30	16	9	7	1	1	32	17
Harvard	9	7	2	0	.778	41	14	15	12	3	0	66	21
Massachusetts Agricultural	12	9	3	0	.750	51	21	12	9	3	0	51	21
Middlebury	10	6	3	1	.650	45	21	10	6	3	1	45	21
MIT	8	1	7	0	.125	12	32	8	1	7	0	12	32
New Hampshire	12	7	5	0	.583	34	22	12	7	5	0	34	22
Northeastern	11	4	6	1	.409	28	29	11	4	6	1	28	29
Norwich	4	0	4	0	.000	1	23	4	0	4	0	1	23
Princeton	15	11	4	0	.733	48	39	19	14	5	0	74	50
Rensselaer	4	0	4	0	.000	6	20	4	0	4	0	6	20
St. Stephen's	8	1	6	1	.188	8	48	–	–	–	–	–	–
Union	7	2	4	1	.357	19	23	7	2	4	1	19	23
Vermont	8	3	4	1	.438	24	32	8	3	4	1	24	32
Villanova	0	0	0	0	–	0	0	9	3	6	0	34	59
Wesleyan	2	0	2	0	.000	1	13	2	0	2	0	1	13
Williams	13	6	6	1	.500	28	35	13	6	6	1	28	35
Yale	10	10	0	0	1.000	50	10	16	14	1	1	67	19

== Schedule and results ==
Date	Opponent	Site	Result	Record
Regular season
January 10	Union*	Beebe Lake • Ithaca, New York	W 7–2	1–0–0
January 17	at Rensselaer*	Athletic Field Rink • Troy, New York	W 5–3	2–0–0
February 6	Colgate*	Beebe Lake • Ithaca, New York	W 4–2	3–0–0
February 21	at Williams*	Sage Hall Rink • Williamstown, Massachusetts	L 0–3	3–1–0
February 28	Clarkson*	Beebe Lake • Ithaca, New York	L 2–5	3–2–0
*Non-conference game.

== Scoring statistics ==
Name	Position	Games	Goals
James McKowne	C	3	7
Edward Guthrie	RW	5	5
Harold Clark	D/C	5	3
Robert Spitzmiller	LW	5	2
Carleton Endemann	D	5	1
Richard Nulle	Substitute	1	0
Bill Peace	Substitute	1	0
Carleton Cornell	D	3	0
Gordon Priedeman	Substitute	3	0
Jack Shields	G	3	0
Matt Walsh	D/LW	4	0
Jack Draney	D/RW	5	0
Benjamin Rhodes	G	5	0
Total			18

Note: Assists were not recorded as a statistic.
