= 1944–45 Cornell Big Red men's ice hockey season =

Intercollegiate hockey season

- Home ice: Beebe Lake

Record
- Overall: 0–4–0
- Home: 0–2–0
- Road: 0–2–0

Coaches and captains
- Head coach: Nick Bawlf

The 1944–45 Cornell Big Red men's ice hockey season was the 38th season of play for the program. The team was coached by Nick Bawlf in his 23rd season.

== Season ==
Cornell began the season as one of just seven operating varsity teams. Despite this, the Big Red were able to play four games during the season. Unfortunately, the team wasn't at the same level of competition as their opponents and lost all four game by a wide margin. Due to the constraints caused by World War II, the student newspaper wasn't published during the school year. As a result, the information for individual games is only available from outside sources.

The team did not name a captain for the season.

== Roster ==
No.	Nat.	Player	Class	Pos	Height	Weight	DoB	Hometown	Previous team
		Joseph Harron		F
		Dusty Rhodes		G

== Standings ==
1944–45 College ice hockey standings
	Intercollegiate							Overall					
	GP	W	L	T	Pct.	GF	GA	GP	W	L	T	GF	GA
Army	–	–	–	–	–	–	–	10	7	2	1	65	37
Colorado College	–	–	–	–	–	–	–	5	1	3	1	–	–
Cornell	4	0	4	0	.000	7	44	4	0	4	0	7	44
Dartmouth	–	–	–	–	–	–	–	5	5	0	0	37	12
Michigan	–	–	–	–	–	–	–	9	3	6	0	30	62
Minnesota	–	–	–	–	–	–	–	10	7	2	1	–	–
Yale	–	–	–	–	–	–	–	6	2	4	0	–	–

== Schedule and results ==
Date	Opponent	Site	Result	Record
Regular season
January 6	at Army*	Smith Rink • West Point, New York	L 1–13	0–1–0
January 20	Dartmouth*	Beebe Lake • Ithaca, New York	L 1–10	0–2–0
February 5	Army*	Beebe Lake • Ithaca, New York	L 4–9	0–3–0
February 10	at Yale*	New Haven Arena • New Haven, Connecticut	L 1–12	0–4–0
*Non-conference game.
