= 1933–34 Cornell Big Red men's ice hockey season =

Intercollegiate hockey season

- Home ice: Beebe Lake

Record
- Overall: 0–1–1
- Home: 0–0–1
- Road: 0–1–0

Coaches and captains
- Head coach: Nick Bawlf

The 1933–34 Cornell Big Red men's ice hockey season was the 27th season of play for the program. The teams was coached by Nick Bawlf in his 12th season.

== Season ==
Cornell's ice hockey team returned after two years away. The club was only able to resolve its home ice situation for one game, having to play the other on the road. They opened against a fairly poor Colgate team in mid-February, however, Cornell had an almost completely green lineup and could only manage a 2–2 tie. A week later they played their second and last game of the season, falling to a much stronger Hamilton squad, 0–5. The only player who had any previous experience at the college level was Jack Draney, who had been on the last Cornell team in 1931.

== Roster ==
No.	Nat.	Player	Class	Pos	Height	Weight	DoB	Hometown	Previous team
	(United States)	William Adams		C				Malden, Massachusetts
	(United States)	William Carver		C				Ithaca, New York
	(United States)	Jack Draney		LW/RW				Poughkeepsie, New York
	(United States)	Howard Dugan	Sophomore	D				Hamburg, New York
	(United States)	William Dugan		D				Hamburg, New York
	(United States)	Alfred Fauver	Sophomore					Lorain, Ohio
	(United States)	Thomas Haire		G				Brooklyn, New York
	(United States)	William Hoyt	Sophomore	F				Brooklyn, New York
	(United States)	William Morrison		D				East Orange, New Jersey
	(United States)	Rolly Morton						New Rochelle, New York
	(Russia)	Oleg Petroff		G				St. Petersburg, Russia
		Carl Richmond
		Schorn
	(United States)	Alan Stillman		LW				Yonkers, New York
	(Canada)	Ellis Tarshis		RW				Montreal, Quebec

== Standings ==
1933–34 Eastern Collegiate ice hockey standings
	Intercollegiate							Overall					
	GP	W	L	T	Pct.	GF	GA	GP	W	L	T	GF	GA
Army	–	–	–	–	–	–	–	10	4	6	0	24	41
Boston College	–	–	–	–	–	–	–	9	2	6	1	30	35
Boston University	13	6	7	0	.462	46	33	13	6	7	0	46	33
Bowdoin	–	–	–	–	–	–	–	10	5	3	2	–	–
Brown	–	–	–	–	–	–	–	11	8	3	0	–	–
Clarkson	–	–	–	–	–	–	–	10	6	4	0	38	37
Colgate	–	–	–	–	–	–	–	11	1	9	1	–	–
Cornell	2	0	1	1	.250	2	7	2	0	1	1	2	7
Dartmouth	–	–	–	–	–	–	–	17	12	5	0	97	52
Hamilton	–	–	–	–	–	–	–	10	9	1	0	–	–
Harvard	–	–	–	–	–	–	–	13	4	9	0	–	–
Massachusetts State	–	–	–	–	–	–	–	8	0	8	0	–	–
Middlebury	–	–	–	–	–	–	–	11	4	6	1	–	–
MIT	–	–	–	–	–	–	–	12	6	6	0	–	–
New Hampshire	–	–	–	–	–	–	–	12	5	6	1	35	40
Northeastern	–	–	–	–	–	–	–	10	6	2	2	–	–
Princeton	–	–	–	–	–	–	–	17	10	7	0	–	–
Union	–	–	–	–	–	–	–	6	3	3	0	–	–
Williams	–	–	–	–	–	–	–	8	5	3	0	–	–
Yale	–	–	–	–	–	–	–	17	8	8	1	–	–

== Schedule and results ==
Date	Opponent	Site	Result	Record
Regular season
February 10	Colgate*	Beebe Lake • Ithaca, New York	T 2–2	0–0–1
February 18	at Hamilton*	Russell Sage Rink • Clinton, New York	L 0–5	0–1–1
*Non-conference game.

== Scoring statistics ==
Name	Position	Games	Goals	Assists	Points
William Carver	C	2	1	1	2
William Hoyt	F	2	1	0	1
William Adams	C	1	0	0	0
Rolly Morton	Substitute	1	0	0	0
Carl Richmond	Substitute	1	0	0	0
Schorn	Substitute	1	0	0	0
Ellis Tarshis	RW	1	0	0	0
Thomas Haire	G	1	0	0	0
Jack Draney	D/LW/RW	2	0	0	0
Howard Dugan	D	2	0	0	0
William Dugan	D	2	0	0	0
Alfred Fauver	Substitute	2	0	0	0
William Morrison	D	2	0	0	0
Oleg Petroff	G	2	0	0	0
Alan Stillman	LW	2	0	0	0
Total			2	1	3
