= 1934–35 Cornell Big Red men's ice hockey season =

Intercollegiate hockey season

- Home ice: Beebe Lake

Record
- Overall: 2–2–0
- Home: 1–0–0
- Road: 1–2–0

Coaches and captains
- Head coach: Nick Bawlf
- Captain(s): William Dugan; Oleg Petroff

The 1934–35 Cornell Big Red men's ice hockey season was the 28th season of play for the program. The team was coached by Nick Bawlf in his 13th season.

== Season ==
The Cornell hockey team gathered together for the first time after the winter break. The team was looking forward to including some new blood from the freshman squad that had gone undefeated the year before. Unfortunately, the team wasn't able to get any practice in until just 5 days before their first game. The main problem was the same issue the team had faced since its inception: warm weather.

When time came for their first game, the Big Red travelled to Syracuse to take on Colgate, who were using the Colosseum as their home rink. The lack of ice time hampered the Big Red and the team lost a close-fought game despite a strong performance from Oleg Petroff in net. The team was hoping to play a second game before the semester break, however, the poor ice conditions delayed the next game until early February.

The time off allowed the team to practice more while coach Bawlf continued to shuffle the lineup. The changes led to a win for the Big Red in their second game with Guthrie netting both goals in the victory. The rematch a few days later ended with a similar result and the team had a more impressive 6–3 win. The team's final game was against a very strong Hamilton squad and they was soundly beaten, 7–1.

== Roster ==
No.	Nat.	Player	Class	Pos	Height	Weight	DoB	Hometown	Previous team
		Drisler		D
	(United States)	Howard Dugan	Junior	D				Hamburg, New York
	(United States)	Sam Dugan	Sophomore					Hamburg, New York
	(United States)	William Dugan (C)		D				Hamburg, New York
	(United States)	Alfred Fauver	Junior					Lorain, Ohio
		Groat
	(United States)	Glen Guthrie	Sophomore					Ithaca, New York
	(United States)	William Hoyt	Junior	C				Brooklyn, New York
		Johnson		LW
	(United States)	Jim Mills						New York, New York
	(United States)	Howard Oppe		G				New Haven, Connecticut
	(Russia)	Oleg Petroff (C)		G				St. Petersburg, Russia
		John Scott
		William Simpson		RW
		Steiner
	(United States)	Raymond Wattles		D				Buffalo, New York
	(United States)	Alfred Wolff						White Plains, New York

== Standings ==
1934–35 Eastern Collegiate ice hockey standings
	Intercollegiate							Overall					
	GP	W	L	T	Pct.	GF	GA	GP	W	L	T	GF	GA
Army	–	–	–	–	–	–	–	10	4	5	1	21	27
Boston College	–	–	–	–	–	–	–	10	7	3	0	34	34
Boston University	11	5	6	0	.455	30	35	11	5	6	0	30	35
Bowdoin	–	–	–	–	–	–	–	8	1	7	0	–	–
Brown	–	–	–	–	–	–	–	14	7	7	0	–	–
Clarkson	–	–	–	–	–	–	–	13	10	3	0	73	49
Colgate	–	–	–	–	–	–	–	15	4	11	0	–	–
Cornell	4	2	2	0	.500	11	15	4	2	2	0	11	15
Dartmouth	–	–	–	–	–	–	–	21	10	11	0	87	75
Hamilton	–	–	–	–	–	–	–	8	6	2	0	–	–
Harvard	–	–	–	–	–	–	–	12	8	4	0	–	–
Massachusetts State	–	–	–	–	–	–	–	7	3	3	1	–	–
Middlebury	–	–	–	–	–	–	–	8	3	5	0	–	–
MIT	–	–	–	–	–	–	–	10	1	9	0	–	–
New Hampshire	–	–	–	–	–	–	–	12	6	4	2	38	33
Northeastern	–	–	–	–	–	–	–	8	3	5	0	–	–
Princeton	–	–	–	–	–	–	–	16	5	11	0	–	–
Syracuse	–	–	–	–	–	–	–	–	–	–	–	–	–
Union	–	–	–	–	–	–	–	5	1	4	0	–	–
Williams	–	–	–	–	–	–	–	10	6	3	1	–	–
Yale	–	–	–	–	–	–	–	21	14	7	0	–	–

== Schedule and results ==
Date	Opponent	Site	Result	Record
Regular season
January 19	at Colgate*	State Fair Coliseum • Syracuse, New York	L 2–4	0–1–0
February 9	Syracuse*	Beebe Lake • Ithaca, New York	W 2–1	1–1–0
February 16	at Syracuse*	State Fair Coliseum • Syracuse, New York	W 6–3	2–1–0
February 16	at Hamilton*	Russell Sage Rink • Clinton, New York	L 1–7	2–2–0
*Non-conference game.
