= 1946–47 Cornell Big Red men's ice hockey season =

Intercollegiate hockey season

- Home ice: Beebe Lake

Record
- Overall: 0–4–0
- Home: 0–1–0
- Road: 0–3–0

Coaches and captains
- Head coach: Nick Bawlf; Bud Boeringer
- Captain: Joe Harron

The 1946–47 Cornell Big Red men's ice hockey season was the 40th season of play for the program. The team was coached by Nick Bawlf in his 25th season.

== Season ==
Now more than a full year removed from the end of World War II, college hockey was getting back to normal. For Cornell, however, little had changed; the team was still unable to expand their playing schedule due to not having an indoor rink and being relatively remote in central New York. One of the few teams willing to travel to Ithaca was nearby Colgate and the Red Raiders met the Big Red for the latter's season opener. In what would turn out to be the only home game on the year, Cornell got a late start and trailed 1–2 after 20 minutes. When visiting netminder Mark Galloway complained about the lack of light the coaches of the two teams gave their players an extended rest to see if the illumination would improve. When more sun wasn't forthcoming the teams agreed to call the game after just one period.

Three days later, Cornell travelled south to play its first full game against Army. The match turned into a debacle for the Big Red as not only did they lose 1–8 but three players were injured in the game. Starters Ken Hillas and Wally Schmidt came up lame while reserve Dave Batt pulled a muscle in his leg and was knocked out for the year. Even without the injuries, Cornell would have been hard pressed to win the game as the team had hardly been able to practice, an all-too-familiar problem for the club. With Hillas unable to play in the next game, coach Bawlf turned to backup Bill Brady with relative unknown Jack McNair in reserve. Unfortunately for Cornell, Yale was one of the best teams in the country that year and the Elis took no mercy on the short-handed Reds. With Cornell being pummeled by the Bulldogs, McNair was put in midway through the second period and turned in a stellar performance that had the Eli faithful cheer him as he left the ice. They were able to, of course, because their team had won 13–0.

After the third game, head coach Nick Bawlf fell ill and was eventually confined to his bed. When the team returned to the ice in late January for practice, their bench boss was still ailing and had to be replaced by the football team's line coach, Bud Boeringer. While Bawlf was recovering, the team's final game against Colgate was delayed when a warm spell thawed out the Raiders' rink. Several weeks later, with Bawlf still not up to coaching, Boeringer took the Big Red to Hamilton to face the 12–0 Raiders. Several changes were made to the lineup, including moving Joe Louis to right wing and promoting Buck Ellis to the top defensive pair in his place. The changes, however, didn't seem to help as Cornell was routed 3–14. The Big Red's three goals all came in the final frame with the outcome all but certain. A third match between the two was scheduled for the 22nd but was never played.

Nick Bawlf never fully recovered from his illness and died in June. Boeringer agreed to stay on as head coach for the following year.

== Roster ==
No.	Nat.	Player	Class	Pos	Height	Weight	DoB	Hometown	Previous team
		Dave Batt
		Bill Brady		G
		Bruce Care
		Dave Cutting
		Jack De La Rosa		LW/RW
		Buck Ellis		D
		Joe Harron (C)		D
		Ken Hillas		G
		Charlie Holcomb		C
		Joe Louis		D/RW
		Jack McNair		G
		Wally Schmidt		LW/RW
		George Valette		D
		Bob Wagner

== Standings ==
1946–47 College ice hockey standings
	Intercollegiate							Overall					
	GP	W	L	T	Pct.	GF	GA	GP	W	L	T	GF	GA
Army	–	–	–	–	–	–	–	14	4	9	1	64	72
Boston College	–	–	–	–	–	–	–	19	15	3	1	139	63
Boston University	19	14	4	1	.763	159	80	21	15	5	1	170	94
Bowdoin	–	–	–	–	–	–	–	11	3	8	0	–	–
Clarkson	–	–	–	–	–	–	–	15	7	7	1	75	79
Colby	–	–	–	–	–	–	–	–	–	–	–	–	–
Colgate	–	–	–	–	–	–	–	14	14	0	0	–	–
Colorado College	–	–	–	–	–	–	–	19	14	5	0	–	–
Cornell	4	0	4	0	.000	5	37	4	0	4	0	5	37
Dartmouth	–	–	–	–	–	–	–	20	16	2	2	152	54
Fort Devens State	–	–	–	–	–	–	–	–	–	–	–	–	–
Georgetown	–	–	–	–	–	–	–	–	–	–	–	–	–
Hamilton	–	–	–	–	–	–	–	10	4	5	1	–	–
Harvard	–	–	–	–	–	–	–	12	6	6	0	–	–
Holy Cross	–	–	–	–	–	–	–	–	–	–	–	–	–
Lehigh	3	0	3	0	.000	3	21	5	0	5	0	9	41
Michigan	–	–	–	–	–	–	–	21	13	7	1	111	76
Michigan Tech	–	–	–	–	–	–	–	19	6	13	0	–	–
Middlebury	–	–	–	–	–	–	–	10	7	2	1	–	–
Minnesota	–	–	–	–	–	–	–	20	12	5	3	–	–
MIT	–	–	–	–	–	–	–	9	5	4	0	–	–
New Hampshire	–	–	–	–	–	–	–	5	4	1	0	28	19
North Dakota	–	–	–	–	–	–	–	13	7	6	0	56	50
Northeastern	–	–	–	–	–	–	–	14	5	9	0	–	–
Norwich	–	–	–	–	–	–	–	8	4	4	0	–	–
Penn State	2	0	2	0	.000	3	26	3	0	3	0	7	37
Princeton	–	–	–	–	–	–	–	13	6	6	1	–	–
Saint Michael's	–	–	–	–	–	–	–	–	–	–	–	–	–
St. Lawrence	–	–	–	–	–	–	–	6	3	3	0	–	–
Tufts	–	–	–	–	–	–	–	–	–	–	–	–	–
Williams	–	–	–	–	–	–	–	9	2	7	0	–	–
Yale	–	–	–	–	–	–	–	22	15	6	1	–	–

== Schedule and results ==
Date	Opponent	Site	Result	Record
Regular season
January 8	Colgate*	Beebe Lake • Ithaca, New York	L 1–2	0–1–0
January 11	at Army*	Smith Rink • West Point, New York	L 1–8	0–2–0
January 18	at Yale*	New Haven Arena • New Haven, Connecticut	L 0–13	0–3–0
February 19	at Colgate*	Hamilton, New York	L 3–14	0–4–0
*Non-conference game.
