= Big Cedar Lake =

Lake in Wisconsin, United States

- Location within Wisconsin Location within the United States
- Location: Washington County, Wisconsin
- Coordinates: 43.38°N 88.26°W
- Basin countries: United States
- Surface area: 932 acres (377 ha)
- Max. depth: 105 ft (32 m)
- Water volume: 31,983 acre-feet (39,450,000 m^{3})
- Shore length^{1}: 11 mi (18 km); Without islands: 10.2 mi (16.4 km)
- Surface elevation: 1,030.98 ft (314.24 m)
- ^{1} Shore length is not a well-defined measure.

Big Cedar Lake, a lake located in Washington County, Wisconsin, about a mile west of Little Cedar Lake, is the biggest lake of 52 in Washington County. It has 10.2 miles of shoreline, measures over 900 acres, and has a maximum depth of 105 feet.

It is managed by the Big Cedar Lake Protection and Rehabilitation District (BCLPRD), a tax-funded governmental agency with seven commissioners. They provide maintenance, refuse and lake safety services.

Fish commonly found in this lake include Northern Pike, Large Mouth Bass, Panfish, and Cisco. A lesser known fish in found occasionally in this Wisconsin Lake is Lake sturgeon.

The Lake District takes part in Operation Dry Water, an annual initiative aimed at reducing the number of alcohol and drug-related accidents and fatalities and fostering a stronger and more visible deterrent to alcohol and drug use on the water.
