= 1945–46 United States collegiate men's ice hockey season =

- Duration: December 1945– March 1946
- East Collegiate champion: Dartmouth / Yale
- West Collegiate champion: Michigan

The 1945–46 United States collegiate men's ice hockey season was the 52nd season of collegiate ice hockey in the United States.

== Regular season ==
=== Standings ===
1945–46 College ice hockey standings
	Intercollegiate							Overall					
	GP	W	L	T	Pct.	GF	GA	GP	W	L	T	GF	GA
Army	–	–	–	–	–	–	–	13	7	6	0	87	70
Boston College	–	–	–	–	–	–	–	3	1	2	0	3	17
Boston University	3	2	0	1	.833	20	10	3	2	0	1	20	10
Colgate	–	–	–	–	–	–	–	8	2	6	0	–	–
Colorado College	–	–	–	–	–	–	–	11	3	8	0	–	–
Cornell	4	1	3	0	.250	9	37	4	1	3	0	9	37
Dartmouth	–	–	–	–	–	–	–	8	6	2	0	66	28
Gustavus Adolphus	–	–	–	–	–	–	–	10	1	8	1	–	–
Harvard	–	–	–	–	–	–	–	8	2	4	2	–	–
Michigan	–	–	–	–	–	–	–	25	17	7	1	167	104
Michigan Tech	–	–	–	–	–	–	–	16	4	12	0	–	–
Minnesota	–	–	–	–	–	–	–	14	9	4	1	–	–
Princeton	–	–	–	–	–	–	–	4	1	3	0	–	–
St. Olaf	–	–	–	–	–	–	–	4	3	1	0	–	–
Williams	–	–	–	–	–	–	–	5	1	4	0	–	–
Yale	–	–	–	–	–	–	–	8	6	2	0	–	–
