= 1944–45 United States collegiate men's ice hockey season =

- Duration: December 1944– March 1945
- Collegiate champion: None

The 1944–45 United States collegiate men's ice hockey season was the 51st season of collegiate ice hockey in the United States.

== Regular season ==
=== Standings ===
1944–45 College ice hockey standings
	Intercollegiate							Overall					
	GP	W	L	T	Pct.	GF	GA	GP	W	L	T	GF	GA
Army	–	–	–	–	–	–	–	10	7	2	1	65	37
Colorado College	–	–	–	–	–	–	–	5	1	3	1	–	–
Cornell	4	0	4	0	.000	7	44	4	0	4	0	7	44
Dartmouth	–	–	–	–	–	–	–	5	5	0	0	37	12
Michigan	–	–	–	–	–	–	–	9	3	6	0	30	62
Minnesota	–	–	–	–	–	–	–	10	7	2	1	–	–
Yale	–	–	–	–	–	–	–	6	2	4	0	–	–
