= 1946–47 Penn State Nittany Lions men's ice hockey season =

Record
- Overall: 0–3–0
- Road: 0–3–0

Coaches and captains
- Head coach: Arthur Davis
- Captain: Fred Bernbaum

The 1946–47 Penn State Nittany Lions men's ice hockey season was the 6th season of play for the program. The Nittany Lions represented Pennsylvania State University and were coached by James O'Hora in his 1st season.

== Season ==
After the end of the war, many of the players on previous teams returned to campus. Penn State restarted its ice hockey program in 1946 and arranged a few games but the problems that had plagued the team before had not been resolved. The program still didn't have a home building and the cost of travelling for all of its games was a burden. On top of that, despite having veteran players, the team wasn't competitive in any of its games. After the year the school made the only choice it had a discontinued the varsity program. It would later resurface as a club team in the early 1970s and eventually return to varsity status in 2012

== Roster ==
No.	Nat.	Player	Class	Pos	Height	Weight	DoB	Hometown	Previous team
		Fred Bernbaum (C)
		B. Black
		Ted Cauffman
		Dunbar
		John Egan
		T. J. Goodwin
		Granahan
		P. Heberling
		Hoyes
		Bill Levy
		Malloy
		Richard Nelson
		Roy Rumbaugh
		Stan Skuta
		Wilson

== Standings ==
1946–47 College ice hockey standings
	Intercollegiate							Overall					
	GP	W	L	T	Pct.	GF	GA	GP	W	L	T	GF	GA
Army	–	–	–	–	–	–	–	14	4	9	1	64	72
Boston College	–	–	–	–	–	–	–	19	15	3	1	139	63
Boston University	19	14	4	1	.763	159	80	21	15	5	1	170	94
Bowdoin	–	–	–	–	–	–	–	11	3	8	0	–	–
Clarkson	–	–	–	–	–	–	–	15	7	7	1	75	79
Colby	–	–	–	–	–	–	–	–	–	–	–	–	–
Colgate	–	–	–	–	–	–	–	14	14	0	0	–	–
Colorado College	–	–	–	–	–	–	–	19	14	5	0	–	–
Cornell	4	0	4	0	.000	5	37	4	0	4	0	5	37
Dartmouth	–	–	–	–	–	–	–	20	16	2	2	152	54
Fort Devens State	–	–	–	–	–	–	–	–	–	–	–	–	–
Georgetown	–	–	–	–	–	–	–	–	–	–	–	–	–
Hamilton	–	–	–	–	–	–	–	10	4	5	1	–	–
Harvard	–	–	–	–	–	–	–	12	6	6	0	–	–
Holy Cross	–	–	–	–	–	–	–	–	–	–	–	–	–
Lehigh	3	0	3	0	.000	3	21	5	0	5	0	9	41
Michigan	–	–	–	–	–	–	–	21	13	7	1	111	76
Michigan Tech	–	–	–	–	–	–	–	19	6	13	0	–	–
Middlebury	–	–	–	–	–	–	–	10	7	2	1	–	–
Minnesota	–	–	–	–	–	–	–	20	12	5	3	–	–
MIT	–	–	–	–	–	–	–	9	5	4	0	–	–
New Hampshire	–	–	–	–	–	–	–	5	4	1	0	28	19
North Dakota	–	–	–	–	–	–	–	13	7	6	0	56	50
Northeastern	–	–	–	–	–	–	–	14	5	9	0	–	–
Norwich	–	–	–	–	–	–	–	8	4	4	0	–	–
Penn State	2	0	2	0	.000	3	26	3	0	3	0	7	37
Princeton	–	–	–	–	–	–	–	13	6	6	1	–	–
Saint Michael's	–	–	–	–	–	–	–	–	–	–	–	–	–
St. Lawrence	–	–	–	–	–	–	–	6	3	3	0	–	–
Tufts	–	–	–	–	–	–	–	–	–	–	–	–	–
Williams	–	–	–	–	–	–	–	9	2	7	0	–	–
Yale	–	–	–	–	–	–	–	22	15	6	1	–	–

== Schedule and results ==
Date	Opponent	Site	Result	Record
Regular season
January 18	at Colgate*	Hamilton, New York	L 0–14	0–1–0
February 12	at Army*	Smith Rink • West Point, New York	L 3–12	0–2–0
March 3	at Georgetown*	Uline Arena • Washington, D.C.	L 4–11	0–3–0
*Non-conference game. ^{#}Rankings from USCHO.com Poll.

== Scoring Statistics ==
Name	Games	Goals	Assists	Points	PIM
Fred Bernbaum	–	3	–	–	–
John Egan	–	2	–	–	–
Ted Cauffman	–	1	–	–	–
Richard Nelson	–	1	–	–	–
Total		7			
