= Davis Rink =

Indoor ice rink in Hanover, New Hampshire

- Interactive map of Davis Rink
- Location: Hanover, New Hampshire 03755
- Owner: Dartmouth College
- Operator: Dartmouth College

Construction
- Opened: 1929 (96–97 years ago)
- Closed: 1975 (50–51 years ago)
- Demolished: 1985

Tenant
- Dartmouth ice hockey 1929–1975

The Davis Rink was an indoor ice rink on the campus of Dartmouth College in Hanover, New Hampshire. The arena served as the home for the Dartmouth ice hockey program for nearly 50 years and was the last natural ice surface used for Division I hockey when it closed in 1975.

== History ==
After having to field their team on Occom Pond throughout the 1920s, Dartmouth wanted a more permanent home for one of the premier college programs. The college erected Davis Rink in 1929 and, while it was one of the first indoor rinks for a college team, the ice was still natural and subject to weather conditions. While other rinks across the country would retrofit their facilities with artificial ice, Davis Rink would remain an open-air arena for its duration. Towards the end it was apparent that the arena was a drag on the program, with inconsistent ice and very sparse seating, and in 1975 the Thompson Arena was completed and served as the next home for the Big Green.

The Davis Rink would remain on campus until it was demolished in 1985 to make way for the Berry Sports Center.
