= 1946–47 United States collegiate men's ice hockey season =

- Duration: December 1946– March 1947
- East Collegiate champion: Dartmouth
- West Collegiate champion: None

The 1946–47 United States collegiate men's ice hockey season was the 53rd season of collegiate ice hockey in the United States.

== Regular season ==
=== Standings ===
1946–47 College ice hockey standings
	Intercollegiate							Overall					
	GP	W	L	T	Pct.	GF	GA	GP	W	L	T	GF	GA
Army	–	–	–	–	–	–	–	14	4	9	1	64	72
Boston College	–	–	–	–	–	–	–	19	15	3	1	139	63
Boston University	19	14	4	1	.763	159	80	21	15	5	1	170	94
Bowdoin	–	–	–	–	–	–	–	11	3	8	0	–	–
Clarkson	–	–	–	–	–	–	–	15	7	7	1	75	79
Colby	–	–	–	–	–	–	–	–	–	–	–	–	–
Colgate	–	–	–	–	–	–	–	14	14	0	0	–	–
Colorado College	–	–	–	–	–	–	–	19	14	5	0	–	–
Cornell	4	0	4	0	.000	5	37	4	0	4	0	5	37
Dartmouth	–	–	–	–	–	–	–	20	16	2	2	152	54
Fort Devens State	–	–	–	–	–	–	–	–	–	–	–	–	–
Georgetown	–	–	–	–	–	–	–	–	–	–	–	–	–
Hamilton	–	–	–	–	–	–	–	10	4	5	1	–	–
Harvard	–	–	–	–	–	–	–	12	6	6	0	–	–
Holy Cross	–	–	–	–	–	–	–	–	–	–	–	–	–
Lehigh	3	0	3	0	.000	3	21	5	0	5	0	9	41
Michigan	–	–	–	–	–	–	–	21	13	7	1	111	76
Michigan Tech	–	–	–	–	–	–	–	19	6	13	0	–	–
Middlebury	–	–	–	–	–	–	–	10	7	2	1	–	–
Minnesota	–	–	–	–	–	–	–	20	12	5	3	–	–
MIT	–	–	–	–	–	–	–	9	5	4	0	–	–
New Hampshire	–	–	–	–	–	–	–	5	4	1	0	28	19
North Dakota	–	–	–	–	–	–	–	13	7	6	0	56	50
Northeastern	–	–	–	–	–	–	–	14	5	9	0	–	–
Norwich	–	–	–	–	–	–	–	8	4	4	0	–	–
Penn State	2	0	2	0	.000	3	26	3	0	3	0	7	37
Princeton	–	–	–	–	–	–	–	13	6	6	1	–	–
Saint Michael's	–	–	–	–	–	–	–	–	–	–	–	–	–
St. Lawrence	–	–	–	–	–	–	–	6	3	3	0	–	–
Tufts	–	–	–	–	–	–	–	–	–	–	–	–	–
Williams	–	–	–	–	–	–	–	9	2	7	0	–	–
Yale	–	–	–	–	–	–	–	22	15	6	1	–	–

1946–47 Minnesota Intercollegiate Athletic Conference ice hockey standings
	Conference							Overall					
	GP	W	L	T	PTS	GF	GA	GP	W	L	T	GF	GA
St. Thomas †	–	–	–	–	–	–	–	18	14	4	0	–	–
Augsburg	–	–	–	–	–	–	–	–	–	–	–	–	–
Concordia	–	–	–	–	–	–	–	5	2	3	0	–	–
Gustavus Adolphus	–	–	–	–	–	–	–	11	5	6	0	–	–
Hamline	–	–	–	–	–	–	–	–	–	–	–	–	–
Macalester	–	–	–	–	–	–	–	–	–	–	–	–	–
Saint John's	–	–	–	–	–	–	–	13	8	5	0	–	–
St. Olaf	–	–	–	–	–	–	–	12	4	7	1	–	–
† indicates conference champion
