= 1943–44 United States collegiate men's ice hockey season =

- Duration: December 1943– March 1944
- Collegiate champion: None

The 1943–44 United States collegiate men's ice hockey season was the 50th season of collegiate ice hockey in the United States.

== Regular season ==
=== Standings ===
1943–44 College ice hockey standings
	Intercollegiate							Overall					
	GP	W	L	T	Pct.	GF	GA	GP	W	L	T	GF	GA
Army	–	–	–	–	–	–	–	9	5	4	0	56	38
Clarkson	–	–	–	–	–	–	–	7	0	7	0	15	65
Colgate	–	–	–	–	–	–	–	6	4	2	0	–	–
Cornell	4	1	3	0	.250	10	21	4	1	3	0	10	21
Dartmouth	–	–	–	–	–	–	–	7	7	0	0	93	21
Michigan	–	–	–	–	–	–	–	8	5	3	0	39	31
Minnesota	–	–	–	–	–	–	–	11	6	5	0	–	–
Penn State	2	0	2	0	.000	4	25	2	0	2	0	4	25
Williams	–	–	–	–	–	–	–	3	0	3	0	–	–
Yale	–	–	–	–	–	–	–	5	3	2	0	–	–
