= 1932–33 United States collegiate men's ice hockey season =

- Duration: December 1932– March 1933
- East Collegiate champion: Harvard
- West Collegiate champion: Minnesota

The 1932–33 United States collegiate men's ice hockey season was the 39th season of collegiate ice hockey in the United States.

== Regular season ==
=== Standings ===
1932–33 Eastern Collegiate ice hockey standings
	Intercollegiate							Overall					
	GP	W	L	T	Pct.	GF	GA	GP	W	L	T	GF	GA
Amherst	–	–	–	–	–	–	–	1	0	1	0	–	–
Army	–	–	–	–	–	–	–	9	5	4	0	27	35
Boston College	–	–	–	–	–	–	–	6	3	2	1	23	26
Boston University	10	7	3	0	.700	42	17	10	7	3	0	42	17
Bowdoin	–	–	–	–	–	–	–	7	3	4	0	–	–
Brown	–	–	–	–	–	–	–	13	6	6	1	–	–
Clarkson	–	–	–	–	–	–	–	11	6	5	0	45	34
Colgate	–	–	–	–	–	–	–	7	3	4	0	–	–
Dartmouth	–	–	–	–	–	–	–	10	2	8	0	30	58
Hamilton	–	–	–	–	–	–	–	6	5	1	0	–	–
Harvard	–	–	–	–	–	–	–	14	9	5	0	–	–
Massachusetts State	–	–	–	–	–	–	–	8	5	2	1	–	–
Middlebury	–	–	–	–	–	–	–	7	2	5	0	–	–
MIT	–	–	–	–	–	–	–	9	2	6	1	–	–
New Hampshire	–	–	–	–	–	–	–	7	1	6	0	7	25
Northeastern	–	–	–	–	–	–	–	8	3	4	1	–	–
Princeton	–	–	–	–	–	–	–	19	15	4	0	–	–
Union	–	–	–	–	–	–	–	4	2	2	0	–	–
Williams	–	–	–	–	–	–	–	6	0	4	2	–	–
Yale	–	–	–	–	–	–	–	19	11	8	0	–	–

1932–33 Western Collegiate ice hockey standings
	Intercollegiate							Overall					
	GP	W	L	T	Pct.	GF	GA	GP	W	L	T	GF	GA
Alaska Agricultural	–	–	–	–	–	–	–	7	4	3	0	–	–
Marquette	5	2	3	0	.400	13	17	12	8	3	1	55	24
Michigan	11	6	4	1	.591	42	24	16	10	4	2	63	29
Michigan Tech	6	4	2	0	.667	21	19	15	9	5	1	55	35
Minnesota	11	10	1	0	.909	55	10	11	10	1	0	55	10
North Dakota	–	–	–	–	–	–	–	9	1	8	0	–	–
St. Cloud State	7	6	1	0	.857	40	8	11	10	1	0	67	14
Wisconsin	8	0	8	0	.000	3	38	9	0	9	0	5	42

1932–33 Minnesota Intercollegiate Athletic Conference ice hockey standings
	Conference							Overall					
	GP	W	L	T	PTS	GF	GA	GP	W	L	T	GF	GA
Macalester †	–	–	–	–	–	–	–	–	–	–	–	–	–
Augsburg	–	–	–	–	–	–	–	–	–	–	–	–	–
Hamline	–	–	–	–	–	–	–	–	–	–	–	–	–
Saint John's	–	–	–	–	–	–	–	6	0	6	0	–	–
Saint Mary's	–	–	–	–	–	–	–	–	–	–	–	–	–
St. Thomas	–	–	–	–	–	–	–	10	7	3	0	–	–
† indicates conference champion

1932–33 Pacific Coast Conference ice hockey standings
	Conference							Overall					
	GP	W	L	T	PTS	GF	GA	GP	W	L	T	GF	GA
California	–	–	–	–	–	–	–	–	–	–	–	–	–
Loyola	–	–	–	–	–	–	–	–	–	–	–	–	–
UCLA	–	–	–	–	–	–	–	–	–	–	–	–	–
USC	–	–	–	–	–	–	–	–	–	–	–	–	–
* indicates conference champion
