= 1930–31 United States collegiate men's ice hockey season =

- Duration: December 1930– March 1931
- East Collegiate champion: Yale
- West Collegiate champion: Michigan

The 1930–31 United States collegiate men's ice hockey season was the 37th season of collegiate ice hockey in the United States.

== Regular season ==
=== Standings ===
1930–31 Eastern Collegiate ice hockey standings
	Intercollegiate							Overall					
	GP	W	L	T	Pct.	GF	GA	GP	W	L	T	GF	GA
Amherst	9	1	8	0	.111	19	42	9	1	8	0	19	42
Army	12	5	7	0	.417	39	34	13	5	8	0	44	41
Bates	10	5	5	0	.500	23	31	10	5	5	0	23	31
Boston University	8	4	4	0	.500	22	30	12	6	6	0	28	41
Bowdoin	8	2	6	0	.250	19	31	8	2	6	0	19	31
Brown	10	9	1	0	.900	42	19	10	9	1	0	42	19
Clarkson	5	4	1	0	.800	15	9	12	11	1	0	63	20
Colgate	4	1	3	0	.250	9	14	4	1	3	0	9	14
Connecticut Agricultural	3	1	1	1	.500	4	11	3	1	1	1	4	11
Cornell	5	3	2	0	.600	18	15	5	3	2	0	18	15
Dartmouth	13	5	8	0	.385	46	39	13	5	8	0	46	39
Hamilton	8	6	1	1	.813	30	16	9	7	1	1	32	17
Harvard	9	7	2	0	.778	41	14	15	12	3	0	66	21
Massachusetts Agricultural	12	9	3	0	.750	51	21	12	9	3	0	51	21
Middlebury	10	6	3	1	.650	45	21	10	6	3	1	45	21
MIT	8	1	7	0	.125	12	32	8	1	7	0	12	32
New Hampshire	12	7	5	0	.583	34	22	12	7	5	0	34	22
Northeastern	11	4	6	1	.409	28	29	11	4	6	1	28	29
Norwich	4	0	4	0	.000	1	23	4	0	4	0	1	23
Princeton	15	11	4	0	.733	48	39	19	14	5	0	74	50
Rensselaer	4	0	4	0	.000	6	20	4	0	4	0	6	20
St. Stephen's	8	1	6	1	.188	8	48	–	–	–	–	–	–
Union	7	2	4	1	.357	19	23	7	2	4	1	19	23
Vermont	8	3	4	1	.438	24	32	8	3	4	1	24	32
Villanova	0	0	0	0	–	0	0	9	3	6	0	34	59
Wesleyan	2	0	2	0	.000	1	13	2	0	2	0	1	13
Williams	13	6	6	1	.500	28	35	13	6	6	1	28	35
Yale	10	10	0	0	1.000	50	10	16	14	1	1	67	19

1930–31 Midwestern Collegiate ice hockey standings
	Intercollegiate							Overall					
	GP	W	L	T	Pct.	GF	GA	GP	W	L	T	GF	GA
Detroit	0	0	0	0	–	0	0	7	2	4	1	19	26
Duluth State Teachers	0	0	0	0	–	0	0	3	0	3	0	6	18
Marquette	9	5	3	1	.611	19	18	9	5	3	1	19	18
Michigan	12	7	4	1	.625	21	16	17	10	5	2	40	25
Michigan Tech	4	0	4	0	.000	5	20	9	2	7	0	14	27
Minnesota	15	6	8	1	.433	35	30	19	7	11	1	48	50
North Dakota	1	0	1	0	.000	0	5	1	0	1	0	0	5
North Dakota Agricultural	1	1	0	0	1.000	5	0	4	3	1	0	-	-
Saint Mary's	3	2	1	0	.667	7	3	11	9	2	0	42	13
Wisconsin	9	4	4	1	.500	10	12	11	4	6	1	13	19

1930–31 St. Paul Intercollegiate Hockey League ice hockey standings
	Conference							Overall					
	GP	W	L	T	PTS	GF	GA	GP	W	L	T	GF	GA
Macalester †	9	6	1	2	.778	24	4	10	7	1	2	26	5
St. Thomas	9	3	2	4	.556	7	5	11	3	4	4	7	11
Luther Seminary	7	1	4	2	.286	5	13	–	–	–	–	–	–
Hamline	7	1	4	2	.286	2	14	7	1	4	2	2	14
† indicates conference champion

1930–31 Pacific Collegiate ice hockey standings
	Intercollegiate							Overall					
	GP	W	L	T	PTS	GF	GA	GP	W	L	T	GF	GA
California	6	0	6	0	.000	8	19	10	1	9	0	18	33
Loyola	4	0	3	1	.125	5	8	6	1	4	1	12	13
UCLA	8	3	4	1	.438	14	15	11	6	4	1	26	22
USC	10	10	0	0	1.000	25	10	13	13	0	0	31	13
