= 1935–36 United States collegiate men's ice hockey season =

- Duration: December 1935– March 1936
- East Collegiate champion: Clarkson / Harvard
- West Collegiate champion: Minnesota

The 1935–36 United States collegiate men's ice hockey season was the 42nd season of collegiate ice hockey in the United States.

== Regular season ==
=== Standings ===
1935–36 Eastern Collegiate ice hockey standings
	Intercollegiate							Overall					
	GP	W	L	T	Pct.	GF	GA	GP	W	L	T	GF	GA
Army	–	–	–	–	–	–	–	9	5	4	0	22	31
Boston College	–	–	–	–	–	–	–	12	7	4	1	61	34
Boston University	13	7	6	0	.538	56	58	13	7	6	0	56	58
Bowdoin	–	–	–	–	–	–	–	8	2	6	0	–	–
Brown	–	–	–	–	–	–	–	12	7	5	0	–	–
Clarkson	–	–	–	–	–	–	–	16	13	2	1	103	44
Colgate	–	–	–	–	–	–	–	14	3	10	1	–	–
Cornell	4	1	2	1	.375	13	13	4	1	2	1	13	13
Dartmouth	–	–	–	–	–	–	–	22	16	5	1	123	72
Hamilton	–	–	–	–	–	–	–	8	5	3	0	–	–
Harvard	–	–	–	–	–	–	–	17	12	4	1	–	–
Massachusetts State	–	–	–	–	–	–	–	6	1	4	1	–	–
Middlebury	–	–	–	–	–	–	–	12	5	7	0	–	–
MIT	–	–	–	–	–	–	–	12	2	10	0	–	–
New Hampshire	–	–	–	–	–	–	–	13	7	6	0	58	39
Northeastern	–	–	–	–	–	–	–	8	2	5	1	–	–
Norwich	–	–	–	–	–	–	–	3	0	3	0	–	–
Princeton	–	–	–	–	–	–	–	22	13	8	1	–	–
Syracuse	–	–	–	–	–	–	–	–	–	–	–	–	–
Union	–	–	–	–	–	–	–	8	2	5	1	–	–
Williams	–	–	–	–	–	–	–	9	6	3	0	–	–
Yale	–	–	–	–	–	–	–	18	6	12	0	–	–

1935–36 Western Collegiate ice hockey standings
	Intercollegiate							Overall					
	GP	W	L	T	Pct.	GF	GA	GP	W	L	T	GF	GA
Alaska-Fairbanks	–	–	–	–	–	–	–	2	1	1	0	–	–
Michigan	–	–	–	–	–	–	–	16	7	9	0	62	56
Michigan Tech	–	–	–	–	–	–	–	16	6	9	1	–	–
Minnesota	–	–	–	–	–	–	–	16	10	6	0	–	–
North Dakota	–	–	–	–	–	–	–	4	2	2	0	–	–

1935–36 Minnesota Intercollegiate Athletic Conference ice hockey standings
	Conference							Overall					
	GP	W	L	T	PTS	GF	GA	GP	W	L	T	GF	GA
Macalester †	–	–	–	–	–	–	–	–	–	–	–	–	–
Augsburg	–	–	–	–	–	–	–	–	–	–	–	–	–
Hamline	–	–	–	–	–	–	–	–	–	–	–	–	–
Saint John's	–	–	–	–	–	–	–	7	3	3	1	–	–
St. Thomas	–	–	–	–	–	–	–	11	3	5	3	–	–
† indicates conference champion

1935–36 Pacific Coast Conference ice hockey standings
	Conference							Overall					
	GP	W	L	T	PTS	GF	GA	GP	W	L	T	GF	GA
California	–	–	–	–	–	–	–	–	–	–	–	–	–
Loyola	–	–	–	–	–	–	–	–	–	–	–	–	–
UCLA	–	–	–	–	–	–	–	–	–	–	–	–	–
USC	–	–	–	–	–	–	–	–	–	–	–	–	–
Washington	–	–	–	–	–	–	–	–	–	–	–	–	–
* indicates conference champion
