= 1933–34 United States collegiate men's ice hockey season =

- Duration: December 1933– March 1934
- East Collegiate champion: Dartmouth
- West Collegiate champion: Minnesota

The 1933–34 United States collegiate men's ice hockey season was the 40th season of collegiate ice hockey in the United States.

== Regular season ==
=== Standings ===
1933–34 Eastern Collegiate ice hockey standings
	Intercollegiate							Overall					
	GP	W	L	T	Pct.	GF	GA	GP	W	L	T	GF	GA
Army	–	–	–	–	–	–	–	10	4	6	0	24	41
Boston College	–	–	–	–	–	–	–	9	2	6	1	30	35
Boston University	13	6	7	0	.462	46	33	13	6	7	0	46	33
Bowdoin	–	–	–	–	–	–	–	10	5	3	2	–	–
Brown	–	–	–	–	–	–	–	11	8	3	0	–	–
Clarkson	–	–	–	–	–	–	–	10	6	4	0	38	37
Colgate	–	–	–	–	–	–	–	11	1	9	1	–	–
Cornell	2	0	1	1	.250	2	7	2	0	1	1	2	7
Dartmouth	–	–	–	–	–	–	–	17	12	5	0	97	52
Hamilton	–	–	–	–	–	–	–	10	9	1	0	–	–
Harvard	–	–	–	–	–	–	–	13	4	9	0	–	–
Massachusetts State	–	–	–	–	–	–	–	8	0	8	0	–	–
Middlebury	–	–	–	–	–	–	–	11	4	6	1	–	–
MIT	–	–	–	–	–	–	–	12	6	6	0	–	–
New Hampshire	–	–	–	–	–	–	–	12	5	6	1	35	40
Northeastern	–	–	–	–	–	–	–	10	6	2	2	–	–
Princeton	–	–	–	–	–	–	–	17	10	7	0	–	–
Union	–	–	–	–	–	–	–	6	3	3	0	–	–
Williams	–	–	–	–	–	–	–	8	5	3	0	–	–
Yale	–	–	–	–	–	–	–	17	8	8	1	–	–

1933–34 Western Collegiate ice hockey standings
	Intercollegiate							Overall					
	GP	W	L	T	Pct.	GF	GA	GP	W	L	T	GF	GA
Alaska Agricultural	–	–	–	–	–	–	–	3	2	0	1	–	–
Michigan	–	–	–	–	–	–	–	16	10	6	0	42	31
Michigan Tech	–	–	–	–	–	–	–	22	13	8	1	–	–
Minnesota	–	–	–	–	–	–	–	14	11	3	0	–	–
St. Cloud State	2	2	0	0	1.000	15	2	9	7	1	1	42	22
Wisconsin	–	–	–	–	–	–	–	8	3	4	1	–	–

1933–34 Minnesota Intercollegiate Athletic Conference ice hockey standings
	Conference							Overall					
	GP	W	L	T	PTS	GF	GA	GP	W	L	T	GF	GA
St. Thomas †	–	–	–	–	–	–	–	7	4	2	1	–	–
Augsburg	–	–	–	–	–	–	–	–	–	–	–	–	–
Hamline	–	–	–	–	–	–	–	–	–	–	–	–	–
Macalester	–	–	–	–	–	–	–	–	–	–	–	–	–
Saint John's	–	–	–	–	–	–	–	8	3	5	0	–	–
† indicates conference champion

1933–34 Pacific Coast Conference ice hockey standings
	Conference							Overall					
	GP	W	L	T	PTS	GF	GA	GP	W	L	T	GF	GA
California	–	–	–	–	–	–	–	–	–	–	–	–	–
Loyola	–	–	–	–	–	–	–	–	–	–	–	–	–
UCLA	–	–	–	–	–	–	–	–	–	–	–	–	–
USC	–	–	–	–	–	–	–	–	–	–	–	–	–
* indicates conference champion
