= 1934–35 United States collegiate men's ice hockey season =

- Duration: December 1934– March 1935
- East Collegiate champion: Clarkson
- West Collegiate champion: Michigan

The 1934–35 United States collegiate men's ice hockey season was the 41st season of collegiate ice hockey in the United States.

== Regular season ==
=== Standings ===
1934–35 Eastern Collegiate ice hockey standings
	Intercollegiate							Overall					
	GP	W	L	T	Pct.	GF	GA	GP	W	L	T	GF	GA
Army	–	–	–	–	–	–	–	10	4	5	1	21	27
Boston College	–	–	–	–	–	–	–	10	7	3	0	34	34
Boston University	11	5	6	0	.455	30	35	11	5	6	0	30	35
Bowdoin	–	–	–	–	–	–	–	8	1	7	0	–	–
Brown	–	–	–	–	–	–	–	14	7	7	0	–	–
Clarkson	–	–	–	–	–	–	–	13	10	3	0	73	49
Colgate	–	–	–	–	–	–	–	15	4	11	0	–	–
Cornell	4	2	2	0	.500	11	15	4	2	2	0	11	15
Dartmouth	–	–	–	–	–	–	–	21	10	11	0	87	75
Hamilton	–	–	–	–	–	–	–	8	6	2	0	–	–
Harvard	–	–	–	–	–	–	–	12	8	4	0	–	–
Massachusetts State	–	–	–	–	–	–	–	7	3	3	1	–	–
Middlebury	–	–	–	–	–	–	–	8	3	5	0	–	–
MIT	–	–	–	–	–	–	–	10	1	9	0	–	–
New Hampshire	–	–	–	–	–	–	–	12	6	4	2	38	33
Northeastern	–	–	–	–	–	–	–	8	3	5	0	–	–
Princeton	–	–	–	–	–	–	–	16	5	11	0	–	–
Syracuse	–	–	–	–	–	–	–	–	–	–	–	–	–
Union	–	–	–	–	–	–	–	5	1	4	0	–	–
Williams	–	–	–	–	–	–	–	10	6	3	1	–	–
Yale	–	–	–	–	–	–	–	21	14	7	0	–	–

1934–35 Western Collegiate ice hockey standings
	Intercollegiate							Overall					
	GP	W	L	T	Pct.	GF	GA	GP	W	L	T	GF	GA
Alaska Agricultural	–	–	–	–	–	–	–	3	2	1	0	–	–
Michigan	10	7	1	2	.800	32	13	17	12	3	2	60	30
Michigan Tech	–	–	–	–	–	–	–	17	4	11	2	–	–
Minnesota	–	–	–	–	–	–	–	17	9	6	2	–	–
St. Cloud State	1	1	0	0	1.000	8	2	27	25	2	0	169	63
Wisconsin	–	–	–	–	–	–	–	11	5	6	0	–	–

1934–35 Minnesota Intercollegiate Athletic Conference ice hockey standings
	Conference							Overall					
	GP	W	L	T	PTS	GF	GA	GP	W	L	T	GF	GA
Saint John's †	–	–	–	–	–	–	–	10	6	4	0	–	–
Augsburg	–	–	–	–	–	–	–	–	–	–	–	–	–
Hamline	–	–	–	–	–	–	–	–	–	–	–	–	–
Macalester	–	–	–	–	–	–	–	–	–	–	–	–	–
St. Thomas	–	–	–	–	–	–	–	6	2	4	0	–	–
† indicates conference champion

1934–35 Pacific Coast Conference ice hockey standings
	Conference							Overall					
	GP	W	L	T	PTS	GF	GA	GP	W	L	T	GF	GA
California	–	–	–	–	–	–	–	–	–	–	–	–	–
Loyola	–	–	–	–	–	–	–	–	–	–	–	–	–
UCLA	–	–	–	–	–	–	–	–	–	–	–	–	–
USC	–	–	–	–	–	–	–	–	–	–	–	–	–
* indicates conference champion
