= 1941–42 Illinois Fighting Illini men's ice hockey season =

Western Intercollegiate Champion
- Conference: Independent
- Home ice: University of Illinois Ice Arena

Record
- Overall: 10–4–2
- Home: 7–2–0
- Road: 2–2–2
- Neutral: 1–0–0

Coaches and captains
- Head coach: Vic Heyliger
- Captain: Joe Lotzer

The 1941–42 Illinois Fighting Illini men's ice hockey season was the 5th season of play for the program.

== Season ==
As the season began, most were expecting Illinois to be in the thick of things for an Intercollegiate title. The team returned 8 players from the previous season's championship team and, though it had lost Norbert Sterle to the professional ranks, the rest of the team should be better with more time to practice. Coach Heyliger scheduled 16 games for the Illini, including a showdown with eastern power Dartmouth, but was unable to come to terms with their Big Ten rival Minnesota.

Illinois was set to begin their season on December 8 against the London Athletic Club and ended up played the game on the same day as the bombing of Pearl Harbor. Due to the outbreak of the war, the status for most players was up in the air. Starr Owen and Gil Priestly enlisted in the army, but were given special permission to remain enrolled at Illinois for a time. Both players were able to participate in the two Dartmouth games before Christmas and the team needed every advantage to take on the powerful Indians. Unfortunately, permission for both players was withdrawn on the day of the game and the Illini had to go without two of their best forwards. Instead, the starting forwards for the team were the Eveleth boys, Roland DePaul flanked by brothers Mario and Aldo Palazzari. The Illini scored early in the game but their offense couldn't get another past the Dartmouth netminder for the remainder of regulation. The Indians tied the score mid-way through the game but were equally stymied by Ray Killen. The game broke open in the overtime session and Dartmouth scored three goals in quick succession to take the first game. The second match happened two days later at home and both teams looked much better on offense. Illinois built a 4–2 lead early in the third but could no longer contain Dartmouth's star player. Dick Rondeau, who already had a goal and an assist to that point, took over and scored two unassisted goals (one with 15 seconds remaining) to tie the game and send the two teams into overtime. With just 30 second left in the extra session he scored his fourth of the night to tip the scales in favor of the green, leaving Illinois heartbroken over their lost sweep of the Indians.

Due to Minnesota's refusal to play Illinois, Big Ten bragging rights would be determined by how the two teams fared against Michigan. The Illini sent 13 men to Ann Arbor, losing Joe Brooks to a broken hand, but the Wolverines were missing 4 players due to academic ineligibility and were soundly defeated in both games. The three Minnesotans were front and center, scoring 10 goals and 16 assists combined in the two games. The following week the team played host to Michigan Tech and throttled the Huskies, earning the Illini's second shutout of the year. With the team's record at 6–1 they were well on their way to winning an Intercollegiate title but the team was about to suffer major losses.

While second and third on the team in scoring, sophomores Mario Palazzari and Roland DePaul left school to sign with Akron, a farm team for the Cleveland Barons. Clint McCune also left school, following Owen and Priestly into the military. While McCune's loss was not a surprise, losing two of the three Eveleth players was, particularly since neither had informed Heyliger or Aldo Palazzari of their intentions. The rumor at the time was that both players had poor grades and were going to be ruled ineligible after the semester break anyway. Joe Brooks was ruled ineligible after failing an exam. The team almost lost Amo Bessone to the war but he was able to receive a deferment while "Bibbs" Miller had to return home to report to his draft board.

As the team was preparing for its rematch with Michigan Tech, they received more bad news as Aldo Palazzari's GPA had fallen below the required 2.75 and he was now ineligible for the remainder of the season. The team ended up losing Russ Priestly and Lou Ferronti for academic reasons as well, leaving Vic Heyliger with just 8 players (2 of them goaltenders) by early February. Somehow, the crippled team managed to earn a tie with MTU in the first game before suffering a seemingly-inevitable loss in the final match. After the game two games against Colorado College were cancelled due to constraints of the war. A second series was still scheduled for early March.

Before their next game against the Paris Athletic Club, Illinois lost team captain Joe Lotzer when he had to return home after the sudden death of his mother. Before the game, however, the team finally received some good news; Lou Ferronti had passed a special examination and was allowed to participate in the game. With new add Twitchell and defensive convert Benson on the starting forward line, Illinois fought a hard-earned victory over the Canadian amateur club. Benson's hat-trick in the second period lifted the Illini to victory and gave them hope that they could finish out the season well.

Lotzer returned for the next game against Brantford A.C. but the team was routed by a 4-goal third period from the visitors. They recovered for a 5–3 win in the second match to earn a split. A week later the team headed to Colorado to take on the Colorado College. The Tigers were a tough team but had had a rough go early that left them with a losing record. Illinois was slow out of the gate, shooting just 22 shots in the first game and fell 2–4. The Illini recovered a bit in the second game, earning a 3–3 tie, but their claim on a second intercollege title had taken a hit. Despite their misfortune, however, the team could end the season on a high-note against Michigan. The Wolverines had given the Illini a gift by defeating Minnesota in one of their four games, meaning that the Illini could claim an (unofficial) conference championship with two wins. In the first game the depleted Illini were still heads-and-shoulders above the Wolverines and outshot their opponents 49–27 en route to a 6–2 win. Illinois capped off its season with a convincing 9–4 win to seal a conference title. The game was highlighted by an assist from Jack Gillan in his final game; the goaltender made a save and the puck rebounded half-way down the ice where it was picked up by Benson and slipped to Ferronti, who ended the scoring on a 10-foot shot. It was likely that most of the team had played their final games as most were expected to be drafted shortly thereafter.

== Roster ==
No.	Nat.	Player	Class	Pos	Height	Weight	DoB	Hometown	Previous team
	(United States)	George L. Balestri	Sophomore	D			1921-02-01	West Springfield, Massachusetts
	(United States)	Herschel Benson	Sophomore	F/D				Wilton, Maine
	(United States)	Amo Bessone	Junior	D			1916-07-22	Springfield, Massachusetts
		Joe Brooks	Sophomore	D
	(United States)	Roland DePaul	Sophomore	F				Eveleth, Minnesota
	(United States)	Louis A. Ferronti	Sophomore	F				Springfield, Massachusetts
	(United States)	John H. Gillan	Senior	G				Western Springs, Illinois
	(Canada)	Raymond Killan	Sophomore	G/F				Lloydminster, Saskatchewan
	(United States)	Joseph J. Lotzer (C)	Senior	F				Fond du Lac, Wisconsin
	(United States)	Clinton C. McCune	Junior	F				Chicago, Illinois
	(Canada)	Bibbs Miller	Sophomore	F				Fort Frances, Ontario
	(United States)	Starr H. Owen	Junior	F				Arlington, Massachusetts
	(United States)	Aldo Palazzari	Junior	F			1918-07-25	Eveleth, Minnesota
	(United States)	Mario Palazzari	Sophomore	F				Eveleth, Minnesota
	(United States)	Gil Priestly	Junior	F				Melrose, Massachusetts
	(United States)	Russ Priestly	Sophomore	F
	(United States)	Tom Twitchell	Sophomore	F				Arlington, Massachusetts

== Standings ==
1941–42 Western Collegiate ice hockey standings
	Intercollegiate							Overall					
	GP	W	L	T	Pct.	GF	GA	GP	W	L	T	GF	GA
Colorado College	12	6	3	3	.625	42	42	15	6	6	3	45	54
Illinois	12	7	3	2	.667	61	28	16	10	4	2	81	44
Michigan	14	2	10	2	.214	23	73	18	2	14	2	30	95
Michigan Tech	12	3	6	3	.375	24	37	12	3	6	3	24	37
Minnesota	10	6	4	0	.600	35	21	12	7	5	0	38	25

== Schedule and results ==
Date	Opponent	Site	Result	Record
Regular season
December 8	London A.C.*	University of Illinois Ice Arena • Champaign, Illinois	W 6–3	1–0–0
December 21	vs. Dartmouth*	Chicago Stadium • Chicago, Illinois	W 4–1 ^{OT}	2–0–0
December 23	Dartmouth*	University of Illinois Ice Arena • Champaign, Illinois	L 4–5 ^{OT}	2–1–0
January 15	at Michigan*	Weinberg Coliseum • Ann Arbor, Michigan	W 10–0	3–1–0
January 17	at Michigan*	Weinberg Coliseum • Ann Arbor, Michigan	W 6–2	4–1–0
January 22	Michigan Tech*	University of Illinois Ice Arena • Champaign, Illinois	W 5–1	5–1–0
January 24	Michigan Tech*	University of Illinois Ice Arena • Champaign, Illinois	W 7–0	6–1–0
February 6	at Michigan Tech*	Houghton, Michigan	T 2–2 ^{OT}	6–1–1
February 7	at Michigan Tech*	Houghton, Michigan	L 3–4	6–2–1
February 16	Paris A.C.*	University of Illinois Ice Arena • Champaign, Illinois	W 5–3	7–2–1
February 19	Brantford A.C.*	University of Illinois Ice Arena • Champaign, Illinois	L 4–7	7–3–1
February 21	Brantford A.C.*	University of Illinois Ice Arena • Champaign, Illinois	W 5–3	8–3–1
March 6	at Colorado College*	Broadmoor Ice Palace • Colorado Springs, Colorado	L 2–4	8–4–1
March 7	at Colorado College*	Broadmoor Ice Palace • Colorado Springs, Colorado	T 3–3	8–4–2
March 12	Michigan*	University of Illinois Ice Arena • Champaign, Illinois	W 6–2	9–4–2
March 14	Michigan*	University of Illinois Ice Arena • Champaign, Illinois	W 9–4	10–4–2
*Non-conference game.
