= 1940–41 Illinois Fighting Illini men's ice hockey season =

Western Intercollegiate Champion
- Conference: Independent
- Home ice: University of Illinois Ice Arena

Record
- Overall: 17–3–1
- Home: 7–0–1
- Road: 9–2–0
- Neutral: 1–1–0

Coaches and captains
- Head coach: Vic Heyliger
- Captain: Chet Ziemba

The 1940–41 Illinois Fighting Illini men's ice hockey season was the 4th season of play for the program.

== Season ==
Entering the season, there was optimism both inside and out for the program as coach Heyliger's first recruiting class was ready to join the varsity club. The team's schedule was expanded to more than 20 games and included some of the best college teams in North America. New members for the Illini had brought a tremendous amount of speed, including out-of-state students like Amo Bessone (Massachusetts) and Norbert Sterle (Minnesota).

The team got an early start on the season, with their first game coming on the 9th against Western Ontario. The game began with just two returning players in the starting lineup (Gillan and team captain Ziemba) while a trio of sophomores from the Boston-area were arrayed at forward. Despite experience being heavily favored towards Western, Illinois skated rings around their opponents and won the season opener 9–4. 1,800 fans showed up to see the new-look Illini and they weren't disappointed; both offensive lines were impressive and the defense looked much improved from the previous three seasons.

The team got some practice time in before they headed on a barnstorming tour of the pacific coast during the Christmas break. Over a 15-day period the team had 7 games scheduled and would participate in the first tournament in program history. The team opened their trip against Santa Rosa Junior College (a team made entire of Canadian players) with their two Minnesotans, Palazzari and Sterle, combining for 4 goals and 6 assists. After downing California in the second game they took on the powerhouse USC team and fell 0–1, finishing as tournament runners-up. A couple days later the two met for a rematch and Illinois was handed its second loss on the season, again by a 1-goal margin, but the team finished out its California stay with a win over UCLA. After watching the Rose Parade, the team made their way back to Champaign with a stop over in Colorado Springs. There the Illini took two games in convincing fashion from Colorado College and finished out their holiday excursion with a 5–2 record.

Illinois opened their Big Ten schedule against defending-champion Minnesota but lineup changes for both teams resulted in a more even playing field. Illinois' defense was up to the task despite allowing a goal early in the game. Jack Gillen stopped 28 shots and allowed the Illini to produce a 2–1 lead in the third period. Just when it looked like the team would be able to defeat the Gophers, the Maroons tied the score with less than two minutes left and escaped with a tie. Over 2,000 spectators were hoping for a goal in overtime but none were forthcoming. The game demonstrated that Illinois had caught up to the class of the Midwest and proved it the following night with a 4–1 win, the first in eleven games between the two.

After returning from the semester break, Heyliger's team found themselves shorthanded. The team lost the services of Chuck Mettler due to graduation and Wayne McKibbin due to withdrawal. Joe Gannon and Amo Bessone were suffering from colds and, if that weren't enough, Starr Owen and Aldo Palazzari had been ruled ineligible. A bit of a silver lining came in the series against Michigan Tech since eligibility rules were not in effect until the next semester began. With Owen and Palazzari in the lineup, but Gannon missing from the flu, Illinois headed up to Houghton for the first two games and dominated the Huskies. Despite having just 10 players on hand, the Illini overpowered MTU 7–1 in the first game. Tech didn't take that lying down and recovered for a tremendous effort in the next game. Illinois had to twice overcome deficits and eventually won the match 6–4. A return series was held a week later with the team looking much more itself. Owen managed to pass a special exam and was once again eligible to play. He proved his worth with a 5-point night but it was Norbert Sterle who was the star of the game; in the team's 10–2 win, Sterle scored 4 times and assisted on 4 others to set a new program record.

The next week the Illini travelled to Minnesota for a showdown between the Midwest's two best teams. With Illinois holding the advantage, the Gophers would have to win the series to pull ahead in the rankings. The first game was a hard-fought affair with 10 penalties being called on the Illini (5 to Bessone) but the teams remained within one goal of each other all through regulation. Sterle assisted on all three of Illinois' goals but Minnesota came up with the same amount and the two headed into their second overtime game of the year. Sterle assisted on two more Illini goals in the extra session and, while the Gophers scored in the second half of overtime, they couldn't even the score and fell to Illinois 5–4. The win guaranteed Illinois a winning record against Minnesota and, even after dropping the second game, the Illini had a championship in their sights.

After an easy contest against Brantford Athletic Club, the team took a week off before taking on Michigan to end the year. The Wolverines were in the middle of a horrible season, possessing a 2–10–1 record to that point and the Illini took full advantage of their weakened opponent. Heyliger made changes to his lineup, including a familiar face in Howie Kopel. Even without the normal roster, IU dominated Michigan 7–1 and allowed just 13 shots on goal. With Gillan back in goal for the second game, the team easily defeated the Maize and Blue. Sterle set yet another program record with a 5-goal game (and added 2 assists), breaking the Big Ten scoring record with 19 points in conference games.

With the Championship nearly in their grasp, Illinois lost two players for the first game of the return series against Michigan; captain Ziemba was out with a sprained ankle and Bessone had to return home to Springfield, Massachusetts due to an illness in the family. With Owen and Gil Priestly filling in on defense, the team wasn't quite as good as they had been the week before but the team managed to earn no less than a share of the Championship with a 4–2 win while Sterle padded his total with 2 more points. A day off between matches allowed both defenders to return for the final game and Illinois captured the title outright with a 4–1 victory.

Illinois had become Western Intercollegiate Champions in just 4 seasons, made even more amazing because, until this season, the Illini had just one win against another varsity team in three seasons of play. With most of their principle players still just sophomores, the team was expected to compete for the championship in each of the next two seasons at least but circumstances would change drastically at the beginning of the next year.

Norbert Sterle, who finished the year with 65 points in 21 games (3.10 points per game) set a modern intercollegiate record for points in a season (since broken). His efforts throughout the year were so spectacular that, rather than continue with the Illini, he turned professional with the Kansas City Americans and spent a month with the Chicago Blackhawks (but didn't appear in any games). Sterle didn't play professional hockey for very long, however. After the United States entered World War II, Sterle enlisted and was commissioned as a Lieutenant. He was killed in action on November 19, 1943.

Bill Kerwin served as team manager.

== Roster ==
No.	Nat.	Player	Class	Pos	Height	Weight	DoB	Hometown	Previous team
	(United States)	Amo Bessone	Sophomore	D				Springfield, Massachusetts
	(United States)	Joseph F. Gannon	Sophomore	F				Swampscott, Massachusetts
	(United States)	John H. Gillan	Junior	G				Western Springs, Illinois
	(United States)	Thomas E. Jaworek	Senior	F				New Bedford, Massachusetts
	(Canada)	Raymond Killan	Freshman	G				Lloydminster, Saskatchewan
	(United States)	Howard F. Kopel	Senior	F				Detroit, Michigan
	(United States)	Joseph J. Lotzer	Junior	F				Fond du Lac, Wisconsin
	(United States)	Clinton C. McCune	Sophomore	F				Chicago, Illinois
	(United States)	Wayne J. McKibbin	Junior	F				Fond du Lac, Wisconsin
	(United States)	Charles W. Mettler	Senior	F				La Grange, Illinois
	(United States)	Starr H. Owen	Sophomore	F/D				Arlington, Massachusetts
	(United States)	Aldo Palazzari	Sophomore	F				Eveleth, Minnesota
	(United States)	Gil Priestly	Sophomore	F/D				Melrose, Massachusetts
	(United States)	O. Priestly		F				Melrose, Massachusetts
	(United States)	Norbert J. Sterle	Sophomore	F				Eveleth, Minnesota
	(United States)	Chester J. Ziemba (C)	Senior	D				Chicago, Illinois

== Standings ==
1940–41 Western Collegiate ice hockey standings
	Intercollegiate							Overall					
	GP	W	L	T	Pct.	GF	GA	GP	W	L	T	GF	GA
Alaska-Fairbanks	–	–	–	–	–	–	–	2	1	1	0	–	–
Colorado College	–	–	–	–	–	–	–	20	10	9	1	–	–
Illinois	18	14	3	1	.806	87	41	21	17	3	1	112	50
Michigan	–	–	–	–	–	–	–	17	2	14	1	37	84
Michigan Tech	–	–	–	–	–	–	–	11	1	10	0	–	–
Minnesota	–	–	–	–	–	–	–	16	11	3	2	–	–

== Schedule and results ==
Date	Opponent	Site	Result	Record
Regular season
December 9	Western Ontario*	University of Illinois Ice Arena • Champaign, Illinois	W 9–4	1–0–0
California Invitational Tournament
December 26	at Santa Rosa JC*	Santa Rosa, California (CIT Game 1)	W 6–3	2–0–0
December 27	vs. California*	Santa Rosa, California (CIT Game 2)	W 2–1	3–0–0
December 28	vs. USC*	Santa Rosa, California (CIT Game 3)	L 0–1	3–1–0
December 30	at USC*	Tropical Ice Gardens • Los Angeles, California	L 3–4	3–2–0
December 31	at UCLA*	Tropical Ice Gardens • Los Angeles, California	W 4–2	4–2–0
January 3	at Colorado College*	Broadmoor Ice Palace • Colorado Springs, Colorado	W 7–3	5–2–0
January 4	at Colorado College*	Broadmoor Ice Palace • Colorado Springs, Colorado	W 6–2	6–2–0
January 10	Minnesota*	University of Illinois Ice Arena • Champaign, Illinois	T 2–2 ^{OT}	6–2–1
January 11	Minnesota*	University of Illinois Ice Arena • Champaign, Illinois	W 4–1	7–2–1
January 31	at Michigan Tech*	Houghton, Michigan	W 7–1	8–2–1
February 1	at Michigan Tech*	Houghton, Michigan	W 6–4	9–2–1
February 8 ^{†}	Michigan Tech*	University of Illinois Ice Arena • Champaign, Illinois	W 10–2	10–2–1
February 9 ^{†}	Michigan Tech*	University of Illinois Ice Arena • Champaign, Illinois	W 5–2	11–2–1
February 14	at Minnesota*	Minneapolis Arena • Minneapolis, Minnesota	W 5–4 ^{OT}	12–2–1
February 15	at Minnesota*	Minneapolis Arena • Minneapolis, Minnesota	L 3–6	12–3–1
February 21	Brantford A.C.*	University of Illinois Ice Arena • Champaign, Illinois	W 10–2	13–3–1
March 6	at Michigan*	Weinberg Coliseum • Ann Arbor, Michigan	W 7–1	14–3–1
March 8	at Michigan*	Weinberg Coliseum • Ann Arbor, Michigan	W 8–2	15–3–1
March 13	Michigan*	University of Illinois Ice Arena • Champaign, Illinois	W 4–2	16–3–1
March 15	Michigan*	University of Illinois Ice Arena • Champaign, Illinois	W 4–1	17–3–1
*Non-conference game.

† Michigan Tech archives list the games as being played on the 9th and 11 February.

== Scoring statistics ==
Name	Position	Games	Goals	Assists	Points
Norbert Sterle	F	21	28	37	65
Starr Owen	F/D	21	19	11	30
Gil Priestly	F/D	21	17	12	29
Joe Lotzer	F	21	12	16	28
Aldo Palazzari	F	12	13	7	20
Amo Bessone	D	20	11	8	19
Joe Gannon	F	19	7	4	11
Chet Ziemba	D	20	1	2	3
Howie Kopel	F	9	2	0	2
O. Priestly	F	1	0	1	1
Tom Jaworek	F	14	0	1	1
Clint McClune	F	3	0	1	1
Wayne McKibbin	F	8	0	0	0
Ray Killan	G	2	0	0	0
Jack Gillan	G	19	0	0	0
Total			110	100	210

Note: 2 goals for were unaccounted for in the team's final statistics.

== Goaltending statistics ==
Name	Games	Minutes	Wins	Losses	Ties	Goals Against	Saves	Shut Outs	SV %	GAA
Jack Gillan	19	1160	16	2	1	43		0		2.22
Ray Killan	2	120	1	1	0	7		0		3.50
Total	21	1280	17	3	1	50		0		2.34
