= Roland DePaul =

American ice hockey player

- Born: Eveleth, Minnesota, USA
- Position: Center
- Played for: Minnesota
- Playing career: 1940–1949

Roland DePaul is an American former ice hockey center who was an All-American for Minnesota in the 1940s.

== Career ==
DePaul was one of a bevy of American players to come from Eveleth in the 1940s, He got his start at Illinois under Vic Heyliger but, halfway through his first varsity season, he left the team abruptly. He was rumored to have fallen below the necessary GPA and headed to Akron to continue his career. After World War II he resurfaced in college hockey. Illinois had discontinued its program but DePaul found a landing spot closer to home with Minnesota under the guidance of Larry Armstrong. DePaul played three seasons for the Gophers, leading the team in scoring each campaign. He was named team captain for his senior season and inducted into the Minnesota Athletic Hall of Fame in 2015.

== Statistics ==
=== Regular season and playoffs ===
			Regular season					Playoffs
Season	Team	League	GP	G	A	Pts	PIM	GP	G	A	Pts	PIM
1941–42	Illinois	NCAA	7	10	4	14	—	—	—	—	—	—
1946–47	Minnesota	NCAA	—	13	20	33	—	—	—	—	—	—
1947–48	Minnesota	NCAA	—	22	9	31	—	—	—	—	—	—
1948–49	Minnesota	NCAA	—	24	16	40	—	—	—	—	—	—
NCAA totals			—	69	49	118	—	—	—	—	—	—

== Awards and honors ==
Award	Year
AHCA Second Team All-American	1947–48
