= 1941–42 Cornell Big Red men's ice hockey season =

Intercollegiate hockey season

- Home ice: Beebe Lake

Record
- Overall: 4–2–0
- Home: 1–1–0
- Road: 1–0–0
- Neutral: 2–1–0

Coaches and captains
- Head coach: Nick Bawlf
- Captain: Wilbur Wannop

The 1941–42 Cornell Big Red men's ice hockey season was the 35th season of play for the program. The teams was coached by Nick Bawlf in his 20th season.

== Season ==
Cornell's season began with the 4th annual Lake Placid Invitational Tournament. The team was fairly young, having six sophomores on the squad, but were still able to compete in the 8-team championship. Cornell dominated Middlebury in the first match but 2-time defending champion Colgate continued their undefeated tournament run with a 4–1 victory in the semifinal. Cornell's offense recovered in the third place match, firing 8 more goals into the net to defeat new entry New Hampshire to give themselves their best finish in three years. Stan Roberts led the team with 6 goals in the series.

After returning to campus, the team once again found themselves at the mercy of the weather. The conditions on Beebe Lake were poor but the Big Red soldiered on, trying to get as much practice in before their rematch with Colgate. Fortunately, the temperature dropped and the ice solidified enough for the first game to be played at Ithaca in two years. The home ice advantage allowed Cornell to build a 5–2 lead by the later half of the second period. However, after the Big Red found themselves playing 4 on 6, the Raiders scored twice to end the middle frame down by just one goal and then put up three more unanswered in the third to win the match.

Cornell would have to wait until after semester exams for their next game. By the time they were ready to go, the weather forced the cancellation of a match against Penn State on February 6. Cornell played a match in the middle of the following week against a weak Union squad and then headed to West Point for their final game of the season. The game turned into a barn-burner after Army led 2–1 after 20 minutes. Cornell evened the score early in the second and the game see-sawed between the two so that both teams had 4 on the board at the start of the third. From there on, Cornell was able to outpace the Cadets and win their 4th game of the season, giving the Big Red a winning record for the first time in eleven years.

== Roster ==
No.	Nat.	Player	Class	Pos	Height	Weight	DoB	Hometown	Previous team
		George Babson		RW
	(United States)	Jerry Batt	Junior	LW				Buffalo, New York
		Whitney Doe		D
	(United States)	Bob Ladd		C				Ithaca, New York
		Phil McGinnis		LW
		Peter Miller		D
		Stan Roberts		D
		Al Schmid		C
		Dave Sisson		D
		Stillman		D
	(United States)	Ward Wannop	Senior	G				Fleischmanns, New York
	(United States)	Wilbur Wannop (C)	Senior	RW				Fleischmanns, New York

== Standings ==
1941–42 Eastern Collegiate ice hockey standings
	Intercollegiate							Overall					
	GP	W	L	T	Pct.	GF	GA	GP	W	L	T	GF	GA
Army	–	–	–	–	–	–	–	12	1	11	0	33	81
Boston College	–	–	–	–	–	–	–	14	12	2	0	78	57
Boston University	14	3	11	0	.214	40	65	14	3	11	0	40	65
Bowdoin	–	–	–	–	–	–	–	10	2	8	0	–	–
Clarkson	–	–	–	–	–	–	–	14	8	6	0	130	96
Colgate	–	–	–	–	–	–	–	13	10	3	0	–	–
Cornell	6	4	2	0	.667	41	25	6	4	2	0	41	25
Dartmouth	–	–	–	–	–	–	–	23	21	2	0	148	65
Hamilton	–	–	–	–	–	–	–	8	5	3	0	–	–
Harvard	–	–	–	–	–	–	–	16	8	8	0	–	–
Lehigh	–	–	–	–	–	–	–	–	–	–	–	–	–
Middlebury	–	–	–	–	–	–	–	14	6	8	0	–	–
MIT	–	–	–	–	–	–	–	14	4	10	0	–	–
New Hampshire	–	–	–	–	–	–	–	14	4	10	0	53	78
Northeastern	–	–	–	–	–	–	–	12	7	5	0	–	–
Penn State	1	1	0	0	1.000	4	2	8	5	3	0	29	19
Princeton	–	–	–	–	–	–	–	16	10	6	0	–	–
Union	–	–	–	–	–	–	–	8	0	8	0	–	–
Williams	–	–	–	–	–	–	–	7	4	3	0	–	–
Yale	–	–	–	–	–	–	–	17	13	4	0	–	–

== Schedule and results ==
Date	Opponent	Site	Result	Record
Lake Placid Invitational Tournament
December 26	vs. Middlebury*	Jack Shea Arena • Lake Placid, New York (Quarterfinal)	W 9–2	1–0–0
December 27	vs. Colgate*	Jack Shea Arena • Lake Placid, New York (Semifinal)	L 1–4	1–1–0
December 29	vs. New Hampshire*	Jack Shea Arena • Lake Placid, New York (Third-place game)	W 8–5	2–1–0
Regular season
January 17	Colgate*	Beebe Lake • Ithaca, New York	L 5–7	2–2–0
February 11	Union*	Beebe Lake • Ithaca, New York	W 10–1	3–2–0
February 17	at Army*	Smith Rink • West Point, New York	W 8–6	4–2–0
*Non-conference game.
