= 1940–41 Cornell Big Red men's ice hockey season =

Intercollegiate hockey season

- Home ice: Beebe Lake

Record
- Overall: 2–5–0
- Road: 0–3–0
- Neutral: 2–2–0

Coaches and captains
- Head coach: Nick Bawlf
- Captain(s): Kenneth Reed; Harry Bill

The 1940–41 Cornell Big Red men's ice hockey season was the 34th season of play for the program. The teams was coached by Nick Bawlf in his 19th season.

== Season ==
As they had over the previous two seasons, Cornell participated in the Lake Placid Invitational early in the year. The Big Red began with a game against Colgate, the defending champion, and ended up losing their chance at the title straight away. Cornell surrendered the first three goals of the game and the heroics in the later half couldn't overcome the early deficit. The Big Red recovered for two consolation wins to finish the championship.

After returning from the winter break, Cornell was able to get in one practice before the rematch with Colgate. The team was contending with a great deal of turnover due to graduation and injuries and the Raiders took full advantage. Team captain Harry Bill knocked the puck into the Cornell goal but the mistake didn't affect the game as the score was already 0–3 and the Raiders shut down the Big Red offense. Entering the next game, Cornell was able to get a weeks-worth of practice under their belt and hoped to get back on the winning side of the ledger. Army, however, was not accommodating and the strong Cadets squad scored six consecutive goals in the second to take the game 8–4.

Due to warm weather, all of Cornell home dates were eventually scrapped and the team didn't hit the ice until late February when they travelled to face Hamilton. The final match of the season took place at the Memorial Auditorium in Buffalo against Williams. The game was played before 3,000 spectators and the audience was able to witness the Ephs hand Cornell their fourth consecutive loss of the season.

== Roster ==
No.	Nat.	Player	Class	Pos	Height	Weight	DoB	Hometown	Previous team
	(United States)	Glen Allen		F				Canandaigua, New York
	(United States)	Jack Babson	Senior	F				Yonkers, New York
	(United States)	Jerry Batt	Sophomore					Buffalo, New York
	(United States)	Harry Bill (C)		D				Greenfield, Massachusetts
		Foster
	(United States)	Bob Ladd		F				Ithaca, New York
	(United States)	Edward Newton		D				Pittsfield, Massachusetts
	(United States)	Bob Pape		G				New York, New York
	(United States)	Kenneth Reed (C)	Senior	F			1920-05-21	Ithaca, New York
	(United States)	Hal Robertson		F				Buffalo, New York
		John Raulf
		Al Schmid		F
		Stofer
	(United States)	Wilbur Wannop	Junior	D				Fleischmanns, New York

== Standings ==
1940–41 Eastern Collegiate ice hockey standings
	Intercollegiate							Overall					
	GP	W	L	T	Pct.	GF	GA	GP	W	L	T	GF	GA
Army	–	–	–	–	–	–	–	11	4	6	1	38	39
Boston College	–	–	–	–	–	–	–	14	13	1	0	130	48
Boston University	14	7	6	1	.536	67	75	14	7	6	1	67	75
Bowdoin	–	–	–	–	–	–	–	6	0	6	0	–	–
Clarkson	–	–	–	–	–	–	–	13	10	3	0	121	45
Colgate	–	–	–	–	–	–	–	11	6	5	0	–	–
Cornell	7	2	5	0	.286	16	29	7	2	5	0	16	29
Dartmouth	–	–	–	–	–	–	–	14	7	5	2	55	43
Hamilton	–	–	–	–	–	–	–	9	5	4	0	–	–
Harvard	–	–	–	–	–	–	–	12	2	9	1	–	–
Lafayette	1	0	1	0	.000	1	3	5	3	2	0	19	9
Lehigh	–	–	–	–	–	–	–	–	–	–	–	–	–
Middlebury	–	–	–	–	–	–	–	14	3	8	3	–	–
MIT	–	–	–	–	–	–	–	13	2	11	0	–	–
New Hampshire	–	–	–	–	–	–	–	12	5	7	0	48	63
Northeastern	–	–	–	–	–	–	–	9	6	3	0	–	–
Norwich	–	–	–	–	–	–	–	6	2	3	1	–	–
Penn State	2	1	1	0	.500	6	4	10	6	3	1	36	26
Princeton	–	–	–	–	–	–	–	15	9	5	1	–	–
St. Lawrence	–	–	–	–	–	–	–	8	3	5	0	–	–
Union	–	–	–	–	–	–	–	8	2	5	1	–	–
Williams	–	–	–	–	–	–	–	8	6	2	0	–	–
Yale	–	–	–	–	–	–	–	17	11	4	2	–	–

== Schedule and results ==
Date	Opponent	Site	Result	Record
Lake Placid Invitational Tournament
December 26	vs. Colgate*	Jack Shea Arena • Lake Placid, New York (Quarterfinal)	L 3–5	0–1–0
December 27	vs. Lehigh*	Jack Shea Arena • Lake Placid, New York (Placement Game)	W 3–1	1–1–0
December 28	vs. Middlebury*	Jack Shea Arena • Lake Placid, New York (Fifth Place Game)	W 1–0	2–1–0
Regular season
January 8	at Colgate*	Hamilton, New York	L 0–4	2–2–0
January 18	at Army*	Smith Rink • West Point, New York	L 4–8	2–3–0
February 22	at Hamilton*	Russell Sage Rink • Clinton, New York	L 2–5	2–4–0
March 8	vs. Williams*	Memorial Auditorium • Buffalo, New York	L 3–6	2–5–0
*Non-conference game.
