= 1939–40 Illinois Fighting Illini men's ice hockey season =

- Conference: Independent
- Home ice: University of Illinois Ice Arena

Record
- Overall: 3–11–0
- Home: 2–5–0
- Road: 1–6–0

Coaches and captains
- Head coach: Vic Heyliger
- Captain: John White

The 1939–40 Illinois Fighting Illini men's ice hockey season was the 3rd season of play for the program.

== Season ==
For the team's third season, they brought on Vic Heyliger, a Michigan alumnus with NHL and MOHL playing experience, as their coach. The team had an abundance of young talent, who would be able to contribute in future seasons but were still ineligible for varsity play. The trouble this would pose for the coming season was demonstrated by an exhibition game in December, in which the freshman team defeated the varsity team 13–5.

Illinois lost both games of their opening series to Minnesota, in which a combined 92 saves from goalie John Gillan were not enough to prevent lopsided scores of 8–2 and 10–2. A week later, Illinois was in Ann Arbor and struggled to score, earning 1 goal in each of their two games against the Wolverines, but they were able to allow far fewer goals to the Maize and Blue.

The team took a few weeks off for examinations and then returned in Early February with a dominating performance over Saint Louis. Despite missing coach Heyliger to illness and two players (Stewart and Mettler) to ineligibility, the team won their first game of the season 11–0. Joe Lotzer set a program record with 7 points in the game (3 goals, 4 assists). The good feelings didn't last long, however, as Illinois traveled to meet undefeated Minnesota in Minneapolis the following weekend and were shelled again in both games.

Heyliger returned after the losses to Minnesota and took the team down to St. Louis for the rematch with the Billikens club team. Despite poor ice the team won 3–0 and then traveled north for their first ever meeting with Michigan Tech. Illinois faced the Huskies in four consecutive games, the first two being on the road, and lost all four matches. While the Illini weren't as outclassed as they were against the Gophers, the team still had trouble scoring and could only notch more than 1 goal in their final meeting. The team ended its season with a home series against Michigan and, after getting shut down in the first game, the team roared back with a tremendous effort. The Illini were finally able to finish their scoring chances and fired three goals into the net while John Gillan shut the door on the Wolverines. The win was not only the first for Illinois against a Big Ten team, but their first against any varsity squad.

James Stables served as team manager.

== Roster ==
No.	Nat.	Player	Class	Pos	Height	Weight	DoB	Hometown	Previous team
	(United States)	Robert J. Falconer	Junior					Riverside, Illinois
	(United States)	George E. Fieldhouse	Senior	D				Pleasantville, New Jersey
	(United States)	John H. Gillan	Sophomore	G				Western Springs, Illinois
	(United States)	Thomas E. Jaworek	Junior					New Bedford, Massachusetts
	(United States)	Howard F. Kopel	Junior	F				Detroit, Michigan
	(United States)	Joseph J. Lotzer	Sophomore	F				Fond du Lac, Wisconsin
	(United States)	Wayne J. McKibbin	Sophomore	F				Fond du Lac, Wisconsin
	(United States)	Charles W. Mettler	Junior					La Grange, Illinois
	(United States)	C. Paul Slater	Senior					Urbana, Illinois
	(United States)	Charles P. Stewart	Senior	D				Chicago, Illinois
	(United States)	Maurice P. Thompson	Senior	D				Pleasantville, New Jersey
	(United States)	John M. White (C)	Senior	F				Seymour, Illinois
	(United States)	Chester J. Ziemba	Junior	D				Chicago, Illinois

== Standings ==
1939–40 Western Collegiate ice hockey standings
	Intercollegiate							Overall					
	GP	W	L	T	Pct.	GF	GA	GP	W	L	T	GF	GA
Alaska-Fairbanks	–	–	–	–	–	–	–	3	0	2	1	–	–
Colorado College	6	3	2	1	.583	21	26	12	7	3	2	65	42
Illinois	12	1	11	0	.083	17	61	14	3	11	0	31	61
Michigan	15	4	11	0	.267	22	52	20	5	14	1	41	71
Michigan Tech	13	8	5	0	.615	29	40	15	10	5	0	36	43
Minnesota	14	14	0	0	1.000	105	16	18	18	0	0	138	25

== Schedule and results ==
Date	Opponent	Site	Result	Record
Regular season
January 5	Minnesota*	University of Illinois Ice Arena • Champaign, Illinois	L 2–8	0–1–0
January 6	Minnesota*	University of Illinois Ice Arena • Champaign, Illinois	L 2–10	0–2–0
January 11	at Michigan*	Weinberg Coliseum • Ann Arbor, Michigan	L 1–3	0–3–0
January 13	at Michigan*	Weinberg Coliseum • Ann Arbor, Michigan	L 1–5	0–4–0
February 3	Saint Louis ^{‡}*	University of Illinois Ice Arena • Champaign, Illinois	W 11–0	1–4–0
February 9	at Minnesota*	Minneapolis Arena • Minneapolis, Minnesota	L 1–9	1–5–0
February 10	at Minnesota*	Minneapolis Arena • Minneapolis, Minnesota	L 2–9	1–6–0
February 17	at Saint Louis ^{‡}*	St. Louis Arena • St. Louis, Missouri	W 3–0	2–6–0
February 23	at Michigan Tech*	Houghton, Michigan ^{†}	L 1–3	2–7–0
February 24	at Michigan Tech*	Houghton, Michigan ^{†}	L 1–6	2–8–0
February 29	Michigan Tech*	University of Illinois Ice Arena • Champaign, Illinois	L 1–3	2–9–0
March 2	Michigan Tech*	University of Illinois Ice Arena • Champaign, Illinois	L 2–3	2–10–0
March 7	Michigan*	University of Illinois Ice Arena • Champaign, Illinois	L 0–2	2–11–0
March 9	Michigan*	University of Illinois Ice Arena • Champaign, Illinois	W 3–0	3–11–0
*Non-conference game.

† Michigan Tech archives list the games as being played in Champaign.
‡ Saint Louis' program was a club team at the time.
