= 1937–38 Illinois Fighting Illini men's ice hockey season =

Inaugural season

- Conference: Independent
- Home ice: University of Illinois Ice Arena

Record
- Overall: 0–4–0
- Home: 0–3–0
- Road: 0–1–0

Coaches and captains
- Head coach: Ray Eliot

The 1937–38 Illinois Fighting Illini men's ice hockey season was the inaugural season of play for the program.

== Season ==
At the end of the Great Depression, Illinois decided to join fellow Big Ten members Michigan and Minnesota with their own varsity ice hockey team. The university spent more than $30,000 refurbishing the on-campus rink and managed to schedule a few games near the end of the season. The football team's new line coach, Ray Eliot, became the program's first head coach but didn't have much time to get the hastily assembled team to work together.

Paul Salter scored the program's first goal.

== Roster ==
| No. | Nat. | Player | Class | Pos | Height | Weight | DoB | Hometown | Previous team |
|---|---|---|---|---|---|---|---|---|---|
| | (United States) | Richard K. Babbitt | Sophomore | F | | | | Riverside, Illinois |
| | (United States) | James D. Beaumont | Junior | G | | | | Des Plaines, Illinois |
| | (United States) | Frank E. Bell | Senior | F | | | | Purdys, New York |
| | (United States) | John R. Berner | Senior | F/D | | | | Morris, Illinois |
| | (United States) | Edward H. Carlson | Junior | D | | | | East Moline, Illinois |
| | (United States) | Richard M. Fee | Junior | D | | | | Chicago, Illinois |
| | (United States) | George E. Fieldhouse | Sophomore | | | | | Pleasantville, New Jersey |
| | (United States) | Ned J. Gardner | Junior | | | | | Rockford, Illinois |
| | (United States) | William A. Hochschild Jr. | Junior | | | | | Evanston, Illinois |
| | (United States) | Charles W. Mettler | Freshman | | | | | La Grange, Illinois |
| | (United States) | Floyd A. Neckrosh | Senior | F | | | | Chicago, Illinois |
| | (United States) | C. Paul Slater | Sophomore | | | | | Urbana, Illinois |
| | (United States) | Maurice P. Thompson | Sophomore | F | | | | Pleasantville, New Jersey |
| | (United States) | John M. White | Sophomore | F | | | | Seymour, Illinois |

== Standings ==
1937–38 Western Collegiate ice hockey standings
| | Intercollegiate | | | | | | | Overall | | | | | |
| | GP | W | L | T | Pct. | GF | GA | GP | W | L | T | GF | GA |
|---|---|---|---|---|---|---|---|---|---|---|---|---|---|
| Alaska-Fairbanks | – | – | – | – | – | – | – | 3 | 2 | 1 | 0 | – | – |
| Colorado College | – | – | – | – | – | – | – | 12 | 3 | 9 | 0 | – | – |
| Illinois | 2 | 0 | 2 | 0 | .000 | 3 | 15 | 4 | 0 | 4 | 0 | 5 | 20 |
| Michigan | – | – | – | – | – | – | – | 19 | 13 | 6 | 0 | 70 | 41 |
| Michigan Tech | – | – | – | – | – | – | – | 16 | 4 | 11 | 1 | – | – |
| Minnesota | – | – | – | – | – | – | – | 17 | 7 | 9 | 1 | – | – |

== Schedule and results ==
| Date | Opponent | Site | Result | Record |
Regular season
| February 21 | Notre Dame ^{‡}* | University of Illinois Ice Arena • Champaign, Illinois | L 1–2 | 0–1–0 |
| February 26 | Chicago ^{‡}* | University of Illinois Ice Arena • Champaign, Illinois | L 1–3 | 0–2–0 |
| March 3 | at Minnesota* | Minneapolis Arena • Minneapolis, Minnesota | L 2–7 | 0–3–0 |
| March 10 | Michigan* | University of Illinois Ice Arena • Champaign, Illinois | L 1–8 | 0–4–0 |
*Non-conference game.

‡ Notre Dame's and Chicago's programs were club teams at the time.
