= 1942–43 Cornell Big Red men's ice hockey season =

Intercollegiate hockey season

- Home ice: Beebe Lake

Record
- Overall: 2–2–0
- Road: 0–1–0
- Neutral: 2–1–0

Coaches and captains
- Head coach: Nick Bawlf
- Captain: Jerry Batt

The 1942–43 Cornell Big Red men's ice hockey season was the 36th season of play for the program. The teams was coached by Nick Bawlf in his 21st season.

== Season ==
As they had done over the previous four seasons, the Big Red played in the Lake Placid Invitational Tournament early in the year. Due to the United States entry in World War II over a year earlier, several schools suspended their ice hockey programs beginning with this season. As a result, the normally 8-team bracket was replaced by a 6-team round robin. Cornell won its first two games and had a chance to lay claim to the championship, however, they were soundly beaten by Hamilton in their third match and had to settle for 3rd place. After returning from the winter break two main factor limited the team to just a single game for the remainder of the season: a lack of ice and a dearth of opponents. Cornell's only match after the tournament was against Army and the big Red were solidly defeated.

== Roster ==
No.	Nat.	Player	Class	Pos	Height	Weight	DoB	Hometown	Previous team
	(United States)	Jerry Batt (C)	Senior	LW				Buffalo, New York
		Ed Carmen		G
		Don Clay

== Standings ==
1942–43 Eastern Collegiate ice hockey standings
	Intercollegiate							Overall					
	GP	W	L	T	Pct.	GF	GA	GP	W	L	T	GF	GA
Army	–	–	–	–	–	–	–	11	3	8	0	38	61
Boston College	–	–	–	–	–	–	–	9	7	2	0	62	39
Boston University	13	2	11	0	.154	37	125	13	2	11	0	37	125
Clarkson	–	–	–	–	–	–	–	8	3	5	0	40	66
Colgate	–	–	–	–	–	–	–	11	11	0	0	–	–
Cornell	4	2	2	0	.500	12	22	4	2	2	0	12	22
Dartmouth	–	–	–	–	–	–	–	15	14	0	1	111	48
Hamilton	–	–	–	–	–	–	–	9	5	4	0	–	–
Harvard	–	–	–	–	–	–	–	18	14	3	1	–	–
Middlebury	–	–	–	–	–	–	–	13	3	10	0	–	–
MIT	–	–	–	–	–	–	–	11	3	8	0	–	–
New Hampshire	–	–	–	–	–	–	–	2	1	1	0	8	18
Northeastern	–	–	–	–	–	–	–	13	7	6	0	–	–
Penn State	0	0	0	0	–	0	0	4	2	2	0	9	17
Princeton	–	–	–	–	–	–	–	12	3	9	0	–	–
St. Lawrence	–	–	–	–	–	–	–	5	1	4	0	–	–
Williams	–	–	–	–	–	–	–	4	1	3	0	–	–
Yale	–	–	–	–	–	–	–	13	8	5	0	–	–

== Schedule and results ==
Date	Opponent	Site	Result	Record
Lake Placid Invitational Tournament
December 26	vs. MIT*	Jack Shea Arena • Lake Placid, New York (Game 1)	W 2–1	1–0–0
December 27	vs. Middlebury*	Jack Shea Arena • Lake Placid, New York (Game 2)	W 7–5	2–0–0
December 29	vs. Hamilton*	Jack Shea Arena • Lake Placid, New York (Game 3)	L 0–8	2–1–0
Regular season
January 13	at Army*	Smith Rink • West Point, New York	L 3–8	2–2–0
*Non-conference game.
