= 1942–43 Illinois Fighting Illini men's ice hockey season =

Western Intercollegiate Champion
- Conference: Independent
- Home ice: University of Illinois Ice Arena

Record
- Overall: 10–2–0
- Home: 4–1–0
- Road: 6–1–0

Coaches and captains
- Head coach: Vic Heyliger
- Captain: Amo Bessone

The 1942–43 Illinois Fighting Illini men's ice hockey season was the 6th season of play for the program.

== Season ==
There were high hopes for the team entering the season, but the Illini had several hurdles to yet overcome. The primary concern was the lack of players available for the squad; both academic ineligibility and the draft board had cut Illinois' roster down and the team only had a few alternates left. There was hope that, due to the war, the Big Ten would alter its rules and permit freshman to play varsity sports. Illinois would be well placed to take advantage as the freshman team looked as good, if not better, than the initial varsity lineup. A positive sign for the team was Minnesota agreeing to play Illinois once more and they were included on the program's 15-game schedule. Unfortunately, the Big ten punted on ruling for or against freshman, which left the team with few players.

Illinois began its season against the Chicago Hornets, an amateur club, with just 7 players on the team. Lou Ferronti was missing due to his draft status but the team had received a boon with team captain Amo Bessone obtaining a deferment and being able to finish out his college career. Despite firing more than 50 shots on goal, Illinois lost the first game of the season but the team did demonstrate that they had enough conditioning to last for an entire contest. Entering the series against Minnesota, the team got another player as Bill Prentiss returned from a broken collarbone. So anticipated was the meeting that all 2,700 seats for both games were sold out in advance. Disaster stuck the team after the Gophers had arrived; Rolle was out with a mild concussion, Austin had come down with the flu and Prentiss' injury, which hadn't completely healed, was acting up. The two games were cancelled and the following series with Michigan Tech was in jeopardy.

After a meeting between coach Vic Heyliger and AD Doug Mills, it was decided to cancel all games for the remainder of the semester but to resume after examinations. The plan came into place with the knowledge that several players could become eligible for the team in the spring session. Heyliger sent word of his program's decision to Minnesota's coach Larry Armstrong, offering to forfeit the two matches.

When the team finally got to play their next game, they received good news as Bessone and Henry Coupe passed special examinations to remain eligible. The squad, which were tabbed 'Friday's Children' (in the nursery rhyme Monday's Child, the descriptors for Wednesday and Friday had been swapped), had already gone through a tumultuous season and had played just one game so far. The team sent 9 men to Minneapolis, having added Coupe and Wes Tregoning in the interim while losing Prentiss to academic ineligibility. In their first game in two months, Illinois played well, limiting the Gophers to two goals, but the Illini were limited offensively and lost the game 1–2. Worse, Bessone was injured in the game and there was a chance he wouldn't be ready for the rematch the next night. Bessone ended up starting and the team shot out of the gate, scoring 2 goals in the first. Bessone, however, was ejected for fighting just 7 minutes into the game and the team, which was already short-handed, had to play without any reserves for the remainder of the match. Several players, particularly Tom Twitchell and George Balestri, turned in outstanding performances and held off the Gophers to earn a 2–1 win. Bessone's injury was later confirmed to be a broken jaw.

The following weekend the team took on Michigan Tech. Bessone had had surgery to repair the three fractures and was set on playing while Twitchell had received his orders and would be playing his final games. Bessone and Karakas starred in the two games as MTU was defeated twice and Illinois looked to be succeeding despite all of their difficulties.

Before their series with Michigan, Illinois received word that Minnesota would not count the January games as forfeits. Because of this, the Illini still had a chance to win the Big Ten championship. Good news finally happened with Prentiss as he was able to pass a special exam and was in the lineup for the first time all season. The first game against the Wolverines was Henry Coupe's coming out party. He had been switched to center and responded with a 5-point night. Their huge win emboldened the Illini for the second game and the team fired 66 shots on goal. Michigan did well to allow only 4 goals against but it was more than enough to grant UI a second shutout.

A week later the team headed to Ann Arbor, needing to win both games to capture the Big Ten title. While there had been a good deal of animosity between Illinois and Minnesota over the past few seasons, the Illini credited the Gophers and Armstrong with not taking advantage of their misfortune earlier in the year. Bessone led the charge with a 4-assist game to put the team within 1 win of a title and then Coupe responded with a 4-point game to sweep the Wolverines and earn Illinois its third consecutive championship. Tommy Karakas set a modern-day record with his 4th consecutive shutout.

Illinois wrapped up their season with a two-game homestand against Tech. The two teams were more evenly matched and the Illini had to fight hard to win in both contests. Captain Bessone scored the final goal in his last home game, breaking a 4–4 tie with less than 5 minutes to play. The final game of the year was a rematch with the Chicago Hornets. Illinois avenged their early-season loss with the 10th win on the year, capping off an outstanding campaign.

After the season, Illinois followed most other varsity programs and suspended operations. Despite the team's huge success, the program was never restarted after the war and remains a club team (as of 2021).

Sam Wylie served as team manager.

== Roster ==
No.	Nat.	Player	Class	Pos	Height	Weight	DoB	Hometown	Previous team
	(United States)	Roswell Austin		F				St. Albans, Vermont
	(United States)	George L. Balestri	Junior	D			1921-02-01	West Springfield, Massachusetts
	(United States)	Herschel Benson	Junior	F				Wilton, Maine
	(United States)	Amo Bessone (C)	Senior	D			1916-07-22	Springfield, Massachusetts
	(United States)	Henry J. Coupe	Freshman	F				Cranston, Rhode Island
	(United States)	Thomas J. Karakas	Sophomore	G				Eveleth, Minnesota
	(United States)	William L. Prentiss		F				Portland, Oregon
	(United States)	Glenn Rolle		F				Eveleth, Minnesota
	(United States)	Wesley Tregoning	Senior				1921-08-12	La Salle, Illinois
	(United States)	Tom Twitchell	Junior	F				Arlington, Massachusetts

== Standings ==
1942–43 Western Collegiate ice hockey standings
	Intercollegiate							Overall					
	GP	W	L	T	Pct.	GF	GA	GP	W	L	T	GF	GA
Illinois	10	9	1	0	.900	42	13	12	10	2	0	–	–
Michigan	8	0	7	1	.063	3	36	13	1	10	2	19	61
Michigan Tech	8	1	7	0	.125	18	34	10	1	9	0	26	44
Minnesota	10	7	2	1	.750	34	14	14	8	5	1	44	32
St. Olaf	–	–	–	–	–	–	–	7	2	4	1	–	–

== Schedule and results ==
Date	Opponent	Site	Result	Record
Regular season
December 12	Chicago Hornets*	University of Illinois Ice Arena • Champaign, Illinois	L 3–5	0–1–0
February 12	at Minnesota*	Minneapolis Arena • Minneapolis, Minnesota	L 1–2	0–2–0
February 13	at Minnesota*	Minneapolis Arena • Minneapolis, Minnesota	W 2–1	1–2–0
February 19	at Michigan Tech*	Houghton, Michigan	W 4–2	2–2–0
February 20	at Michigan Tech*	Houghton, Michigan	W 3–1	3–2–0
February 25	Michigan*	University of Illinois Ice Arena • Champaign, Illinois	W 6–0	4–2–0
February 27	Michigan*	University of Illinois Ice Arena • Champaign, Illinois	W 4–0	5–2–0
March 4	at Michigan*	Weinberg Coliseum • Ann Arbor, Michigan	W 6–0	6–2–0
March 6	at Michigan*	Weinberg Coliseum • Ann Arbor, Michigan	W 6–0	7–2–0
March 8 ^{†}	Michigan Tech*	University of Illinois Ice Arena • Champaign, Illinois	W 5–3	8–2–0
March 9 ^{†}	Michigan Tech*	University of Illinois Ice Arena • Champaign, Illinois	W 5–4	9–2–0
March 12	at Chicago Hornets*	Chicago Stadium • Chicago, Illinois	W ?	10–2–0
*Non-conference game.

† Michigan Tech records list the two final games being played on different days with different scores, though both were credited as Illinois wins.
