= Vic Heyliger =

American ice hockey player and coach (1912–2006)

- Vic Heyliger from the 1950 Michiganensian

Biographical details
- Born: September 26, 1912; Concord, Massachusetts, U.S.
- Died: October 4, 2006 (aged 94); Colorado Springs, Colorado, U.S.

Playing career
- 1934–1937: Michigan
- 1937–1938: St. Paul Saints
- 1937–1938: Chicago Black Hawks
- 1938–1939: Detroit Holzbaugh
- 1943–1944: Chicago Black Hawks
- Position: Center

Coaching career (HC unless noted)
- 1939–1943: Illinois
- 1944–1957: Michigan
- 1961–1963: West Germany National Team
- 1965–1966: US National Team
- 1968–1974: Air Force

Head coaching record
- Overall: 353–158–21 (.683)
- Tournaments: 16–4 (.800)

Accomplishments and honors

Championships
- 1948 NCAA National Championship; 1951 NCAA National Championship; 1952 NCAA National Championship; 1953 MCHL Regular Season Championship; 1953 NCAA National Championship; 1955 NCAA National Championship; 1956 WIHL Regular Season Championship; 1956 NCAA National Championship

Awards
- 1954 Spencer Penrose Award; 1974 US Hockey Hall of Fame; 1980 University of Michigan Athletic Hall of Honor; 1982 Hobey Baker Legend of College Hockey Award; 1988 John MacInnes Award

Records
- Most NCAA ice hockey championships: (6); Most consecutive NCAA ice hockey championships: (3); Most consecutive Frozen Four appearances: (10)

Victor Heyliger (September 26, 1912 – October 4, 2006) was an American ice hockey player and coach. He played 33 games in the National Hockey League with the Chicago Black Hawks between 1937 and 1944 and then worked as the head coach in several places, including the University of Michigan ice hockey team from 1944 to 1957. He won six NCAA Division I men's hockey National Championships, the most for a men's hockey coach.

== Career ==
Born in Concord, Massachusetts, he attended the Lawrence Academy in Groton, Massachusetts and as an All-American at Michigan set a school record of 116 goals. He played for the Chicago Black Hawks in 1938 and 1944, bookending his tenure as coach at the University of Illinois from 1939–43, posting a record of 59–29–4.

Returning to Michigan as coach of the Wolverines, he led the team to six NCAA Men's Ice Hockey Championships in his thirteen years from 1944 to 1957: 1948 (the first NCAA title), 1951, 1952, 1953, 1955, 1956. His teams reached the Frozen Four in each of the first ten seasons it was held.

In 1954, he received the Spencer Penrose Award from the American Hockey Coaches Association as the University Division Coach of the Year. Heyliger had an overall Michigan record of 228–61–13. After coaching the U.S. national team in 1966, he coached at the United States Air Force Academy from 1966–74, where he was 85–77–3.

He was inducted into the United States Hockey Hall of Fame in its second class of inductees in 1974. In 1988, he was awarded the John MacInnes Award by the AHCA, an honor that recognizes those individuals who have displayed an interest in amateur hockey and youth programs, as well as fostering high graduation rates among their players.

He died at his home in Colorado Springs, Colorado, aged 94.

== Career statistics ==
=== Regular season and playoffs ===
			Regular season					Playoffs
Season	Team	League	GP	G	A	Pts	PIM	GP	G	A	Pts	PIM
1928–29	Concord-Carlisle High School	HS-MA	—	—	—	—	—	—	—	—	—	—
1929–30	Concord-Carlisle High School	HS-MA	—	—	—	—	—	—	—	—	—	—
1930–31	Concord-Carlisle High School	HS-MA	—	—	—	—	—	—	—	—	—	—
1931–32	Concord-Carlisle High School	HS-MA	—	—	—	—	—	—	—	—	—	—
1932–33	Lawrence Academy	HS-MA	—	—	—	—	—	—	—	—	—	—
1934–35	University of Michigan	NCAA	—	19	11	30	—	—	—	—	—	—
1935–36	University of Michigan	NCAA	—	—	—	—	—	—	—	—	—	—
1936–37	University of Michigan	NCAA	—	43	—	—	—	—	—	—	—	—
1937–38	Chicago Black Hawks	NHL	7	0	0	0	0	—	—	—	—	—
1937–38	St. Paul Saints	AHA	3	0	0	0	0	—	—	—	—	—
1938–39	Detroit Holzbaugh	MOHL	27	5	13	18	38	2	1	1	2	2
1943–44	Chicago Black Hawks	NHL	26	2	3	5	2	—	—	—	—	—
NHL totals			33	2	3	5	2	—	—	—	—	—

=== Head coaching record ===
Record table
Season	Team	Overall	Conference	Standing	Postseason
Illinois Fighting Illini Independent (1939–1943)
1939–40	Illinois	3–11–0			
1940–41	Illinois	17–3–1			Western Intercollegiate Champion
1941–42	Illinois	10–4–2			Western Intercollegiate Champion
1942–43	Illinois	10–2–0			Western Intercollegiate Champion
Illinois:		40–20–3			
Michigan Wolverines Independent (1944–1951)
1944–45	Michigan	3–6–0			
1945–46	Michigan	17–7–1			Western Intercollegiate Champion
1946–47	Michigan	13–7–1			
1947–48	Michigan	20–2–1			NCAA National Champion
1948–49	Michigan	20–2–3			NCAA Consolation Game (Win)
1949–50	Michigan	23–4–0			NCAA Consolation Game (Win)
1950–51	Michigan	22–4–1			NCAA National Champion
Michigan:		118–32–7			
Michigan Wolverines (MCHL) (1951–1953)
1951–52	Michigan	22–4–0	9–3–0	T–2nd	NCAA National Champion
1952–53	Michigan	17–7–0	12–4–0	T–1st	NCAA National Champion
Michigan:		39–11–0	21–7–0		
Michigan Wolverines (WIHL) (1953–1957)
1953–54	Michigan	15–6–2	12–3–1	2nd	NCAA Consolation Game (Win)
1954–55	Michigan	18–5–1	13–5–0	2nd	NCAA National Champion
1955–56	Michigan	20–2–1	15–2–1	1st	NCAA National Champion
1956–57	Michigan	18–5–2	13–4–1	2nd	NCAA Runner–Up
Michigan:		71–18–6	53–14–3		
Air Force Falcons Independent (1968–1974)
1968–69	Air Force	6–12–0			
1969–70	Air Force	11–17–1			
1970–71	Air Force	15–11–2			
1971–72	Air Force	25–6–0			
1972–73	Air Force	16–16–0			
1973–74	Air Force	12–15–0			
Air Force:		85–77–3			
Total:		353–158–21			
National champion Postseason invitational champion Conference regular season champion Conference regular season and conference tournament champion Division regular season champion Division regular season and conference tournament champion Conference tournament champion

== See also ==
- University of Michigan Athletic Hall of Honor

Awards and achievements
Preceded by John Mariucci	Spencer Penrose Award; 1953–54	Succeeded by Cooney Weiland
Preceded by John "Snooks" Kelly	Hobey Baker Legends of College Hockey Award; 1982	Succeeded by John Mariucci
