= 1938–39 Illinois Fighting Illini men's ice hockey season =

- Conference: Independent
- Home ice: University of Illinois Ice Arena

Record
- Overall: 3–7–0
- Conference: 2–4–0
- Home: 1–3–0

Coaches and captains
- Head coach: Ray Eliot
- Assistant coaches: Vic Boutin
- Captain(s): Dick Fee; Jim Beaumont

The 1938–39 Illinois Fighting Illini men's ice hockey season was the 2nd season of play for the program.

== Season ==
The Illini were able to play their first full season in 1939 and showed improvement in their play. The team faced a tough slate of games, being dominated by some of college hockey's best teams but the program was able to earn its first three wins. Dick Fee was team captain until his graduation in February. Afterwards, Jim Beaumont led the Illini.

== Roster ==
No.	Nat.	Player	Class	Pos	Height	Weight	DoB	Hometown	Previous team
	(United States)	Richard K. Babbitt	Junior	F				Riverside, Illinois
	(United States)	James D. Beaumont (C)	Senior	G				Des Plaines, Illinois
	(United States)	Edward H. Carlson	Senior	D				East Moline, Illinois
	(United States)	Richard M. Fee (C)	Senior	D				Chicago, Illinois
	(United States)	George E. Fieldhouse	Junior	F/D				Pleasantville, New Jersey
	(United States)	Thomas E. Jaworek	Sophomore	F				New Bedford, Massachusetts
	(United States)	Arthur C. Jones	Sophomore					Rockford, Illinois
	(United States)	Eugene H. Kaufman	Junior	D				Chicago, Illinois
	(United States)	Charles W. Sigerson	Senior	F				Chelmsford, Massachusetts
		J. M. Sisley
	(United States)	C. Paul Slater	Junior					Urbana, Illinois
	(United States)	Maurice P. Thompson	Junior	F				Pleasantville, New Jersey
	(United States)	Alex Welsh	Sophomore	F				Rockford, Illinois
	(United States)	John M. White	Junior	F				Seymour, Illinois
	(United States)	Chester J. Ziemba	Sophomore	D				Chicago, Illinois

== Standings ==
1938–39 Western Collegiate ice hockey standings
	Intercollegiate							Overall					
	GP	W	L	T	Pct.	GF	GA	GP	W	L	T	GF	GA
Alaska-Fairbanks	–	–	–	–	–	–	–	3	1	1	1	–	–
Colorado College	–	–	–	–	–	–	–	11	8	3	0	–	–
Illinois	7	0	7	0	.000	5	43	10	3	7	0	15	45
Michigan	–	–	–	–	–	–	–	18	8	8	2	54	63
Michigan Tech	–	–	–	–	–	–	–	14	6	8	0	–	–
Minnesota	–	–	–	–	–	–	–	23	17	6	0	–	–

== Schedule and results ==
Date	Opponent	Site	Result	Record
Regular season
December 12	USC*	University of Illinois Ice Arena • Champaign, Illinois	L 0–9	0–1–0
January 6	Minnesota*	University of Illinois Ice Arena • Champaign, Illinois	L 0–6	0–2–0
January 7	Minnesota*	University of Illinois Ice Arena • Champaign, Illinois	L 2–5	0–3–0
January 14	Michigan*	University of Illinois Ice Arena • Champaign, Illinois	L 0–4 ^{†}	0–4–0
January 20	Notre Dame ^{‡}*	University of Illinois Ice Arena • Champaign, Illinois	W 6–0	1–4–0
February 17	at Minnesota*	Minneapolis Arena • Minneapolis, Minnesota	L 0–8	1–5–0
February 18	at Minnesota*	Minneapolis Arena • Minneapolis, Minnesota	L 2–8	1–6–0
February 21	at Saint Louis ^{‡}*	St. Louis Arena • St. Louis, Missouri	W 2–1	2–6–0
February 24	Saint Louis ^{‡}*	University of Illinois Ice Arena • Champaign, Illinois	W 2–1	3–6–0
March 4	at Michigan*	Weinberg Coliseum • Ann Arbor, Michigan	L 1–3	3–7–0
*Non-conference game.

† Illinois archives list the score as 0–8, however, contemporary reports have the game as 0–4.
‡ Notre Dame's and Saint Louis' programs were club teams at the time.
