= Norbert Sterle =

American ice hockey player

- Born: December 4, 1918 Eveleth, Minnesota, U.S.
- Died: November 19, 1943 (aged 24) Italy
- Position: Center
- Played for: Illinois; Kansas City Americans
- Playing career: 1940–1942
- Military career
- Burial place: Eveleth Cemetery
- Allegiance: United States
- Branch: United States Army
- Service years: 1942–1943
- Rank: Second Lieutenant

Norbert John Sterle (December 4, 1918 – November 19, 1943) was an American ice hockey center who set a then-modern record for the most points scored in a collegiate season while helping Illinois win the western Intercollegiate title in 1940–41. He was killed while serving in the United States Army during the Italian campaign.

== Career ==
Hailing from Eveleth, Minnesota, Sterle was one of several recruits enticed to attend University of Illinois Urbana-Champaign by new head coach, and former collegiate star player, Vic Heyliger. Sterle was a member of Heyliger's first recruiting class and, due to rules accepted by all programs teams at the time, Sterle was not allowed to play varsity hockey as a freshman. His first game for the Illini didn't come until his second year when Illinois expanded the team's schedule to more than 20 games and faced an array of other talented opponents. Because three other sophomores had played previously in Boston, and were talented scorers in their own right, Sterle was placed on the team's second line where he remained for most of the rest of the season. He and fellow Eveleth resident Aldo Palazzari formed an excellent working partnership early in the year and resulted in the two become the team's leaders in terms of scoring. The only time that Sterle was held scoreless that season was early on in a game against USC, where the entire team was shut out by a 29-year-old netminder, Clem Harnedy.

Sterle set several program records that season including most points in a game (8), most goals in a game (5) and broke the modern single-season point record of 48 (previously held by his coach Vic Heyliger) by 17. Sterle was instrumental in helping his team sweep their 4-game series against Michigan Tech and Michigan, particularly since the Illini had lost the service of several players (including Palazzari) to academic ineligibility. Ultimately it was the Illini's 4-game series against defending champion Minnesota that decided the championship and it was Sterle's 5-assist game that pushed Illinois over the top on February 14 to guarantee the Illini a winning record against the Gophers.

Sterle finished the year with 65 points in 21 games, better than 3 points per game. His production was so spectacular that he left college after the season and turned professional. Sterle first joined the Kansas City Americans before spending a month with the Chicago Blackhawks. While he never appeared in a game at the NHL level, Sterle halted his professional career in 1942 to enlist in the Army after the United States entered World War II. Because Sterle had previously attended Eveleth Junior College, he was able to finish out a degree at Illinois in 1942. This helped him to be commissioned as an officer and he joined the 143rd Infantry, 36th Infantry Division as a Lieutenant. Sterle was killed while serving in Italy on November 19, 1943, after the German Army had been forced to abandon the Barbara Line.

== Career statistics ==
=== Regular season and playoffs ===
			Regular Season					Playoffs
Season	Team	League	GP	G	A	Pts	PIM	GP	G	A	Pts	PIM
1940–41	Illinois	Independent	21	28	37	65	—	—	—	—	—	—
1941–42	Kansas City Americans	AHA	15	0	0	0	0	—	—	—	—	—

== See also ==
- List of ice hockey players who died during their careers
