= 1942–43 United States collegiate men's ice hockey season =

- Duration: December 1942– March 1943
- East Collegiate champion: Dartmouth
- West Collegiate champion: Illinois

The 1942–43 United States collegiate men's ice hockey season was the 49th season of collegiate ice hockey in the United States.

== Regular season ==
=== Season tournaments ===
Tournament	Dates	Teams	Champion
Lake Placid Invitational Tournament	December 26–29	6	Colgate

=== Standings ===
1942–43 Eastern Collegiate ice hockey standings
	Intercollegiate							Overall					
	GP	W	L	T	Pct.	GF	GA	GP	W	L	T	GF	GA
Army	–	–	–	–	–	–	–	11	3	8	0	38	61
Boston College	–	–	–	–	–	–	–	9	7	2	0	62	39
Boston University	13	2	11	0	.154	37	125	13	2	11	0	37	125
Clarkson	–	–	–	–	–	–	–	8	3	5	0	40	66
Colgate	–	–	–	–	–	–	–	11	11	0	0	–	–
Cornell	4	2	2	0	.500	12	22	4	2	2	0	12	22
Dartmouth	–	–	–	–	–	–	–	15	14	0	1	111	48
Hamilton	–	–	–	–	–	–	–	9	5	4	0	–	–
Harvard	–	–	–	–	–	–	–	18	14	3	1	–	–
Middlebury	–	–	–	–	–	–	–	13	3	10	0	–	–
MIT	–	–	–	–	–	–	–	11	3	8	0	–	–
New Hampshire	–	–	–	–	–	–	–	2	1	1	0	8	18
Northeastern	–	–	–	–	–	–	–	13	7	6	0	–	–
Penn State	0	0	0	0	–	0	0	4	2	2	0	9	17
Princeton	–	–	–	–	–	–	–	12	3	9	0	–	–
St. Lawrence	–	–	–	–	–	–	–	5	1	4	0	–	–
Williams	–	–	–	–	–	–	–	4	1	3	0	–	–
Yale	–	–	–	–	–	–	–	13	8	5	0	–	–

1942–43 Western Collegiate ice hockey standings
	Intercollegiate							Overall					
	GP	W	L	T	Pct.	GF	GA	GP	W	L	T	GF	GA
Illinois	10	9	1	0	.900	42	13	12	10	2	0	–	–
Michigan	8	0	7	1	.063	3	36	13	1	10	2	19	61
Michigan Tech	8	1	7	0	.125	18	34	10	1	9	0	26	44
Minnesota	10	7	2	1	.750	34	14	14	8	5	1	44	32
St. Olaf	–	–	–	–	–	–	–	7	2	4	1	–	–
