= 1942–43 Penn State Nittany Lions men's ice hockey season =

Record
- Overall: 2–2–0
- Road: 1–2–0
- Neutral: 1–0–0

Coaches and captains
- Head coach: Arthur Davis
- Captain: Ted Cauffman

The 1942–43 Penn State Nittany Lions men's ice hockey season was the 4th season of play for the program. The Nittany Lions represented Pennsylvania State University and were coached by Arthur Davis in his 3rd season.

== Season ==
With World War II in full force, many ice hockey programs suspended operations. Penn State tried to muddle through with a shortened season that didn't begin until February. On top of other issues, the Nittany Lions still weren't able to schedule any other varsity program, having played just one varsity game since the team was restarted in 1940.

== Roster ==
No.	Nat.	Player	Class	Pos	Height	Weight	DoB	Hometown	Previous team
		Bob Bacher
		Fred Bernbaum
		Abe Bitner
		Jack Burford
		Ted Cauffman (C)
		Art Gladstone
		Dick Herr
		Bill Levy
		Jim McKechnie
		Stan Skuta
		Don Steva
		Stu Sussman
		Berrick White
		Ed Williams
		Harry Yocom

== Standings ==
1942–43 Eastern Collegiate ice hockey standings
	Intercollegiate							Overall					
	GP	W	L	T	Pct.	GF	GA	GP	W	L	T	GF	GA
Army	–	–	–	–	–	–	–	11	3	8	0	38	61
Boston College	–	–	–	–	–	–	–	9	7	2	0	62	39
Boston University	13	2	11	0	.154	37	125	13	2	11	0	37	125
Clarkson	–	–	–	–	–	–	–	8	3	5	0	40	66
Colgate	–	–	–	–	–	–	–	11	11	0	0	–	–
Cornell	4	2	2	0	.500	12	22	4	2	2	0	12	22
Dartmouth	–	–	–	–	–	–	–	15	14	0	1	111	48
Hamilton	–	–	–	–	–	–	–	9	5	4	0	–	–
Harvard	–	–	–	–	–	–	–	18	14	3	1	–	–
Middlebury	–	–	–	–	–	–	–	13	3	10	0	–	–
MIT	–	–	–	–	–	–	–	11	3	8	0	–	–
New Hampshire	–	–	–	–	–	–	–	2	1	1	0	8	18
Northeastern	–	–	–	–	–	–	–	13	7	6	0	–	–
Penn State	0	0	0	0	–	0	0	4	2	2	0	9	17
Princeton	–	–	–	–	–	–	–	12	3	9	0	–	–
St. Lawrence	–	–	–	–	–	–	–	5	1	4	0	–	–
Williams	–	–	–	–	–	–	–	4	1	3	0	–	–
Yale	–	–	–	–	–	–	–	13	8	5	0	–	–

== Schedule and results ==
Date	Opponent	Site	Result	Record
Regular season
February 8	at Drexel Tech*	Philadelphia Arena • Philadelphia, Pennsylvania	W 4–0	1–0–0
February 17	vs. Drexel Tech*	Hershey Sports Arena • Hershey, Pennsylvania	W 4–1	2–0–0
March 13	at Baltimore All-Stars*	Carlin's Park • Baltimore, Maryland	L 0–11	2–1–0
March 14	vs. Washington All-Stars*	Uline Arena • Washington, D.C.	L 1–5	2–2–0
*Non-conference game. ^{#}Rankings from USCHO.com Poll.

== Scoring Statistics ==
Name	Games	Goals	Assists	Points	PIM
Ted Cauffman	–	4	–	–	–
Frank Bernbaum	–	2	–	–	–
Don Steva	–	1	–	–	–
Bill Levy	–	1	–	–	–
Total		8			

Note: Only the goal scorers in the Drexel games were counted.
