= 1940–41 Penn State Nittany Lions men's ice hockey season =

Record
- Overall: 6–3–1
- Road: 0–1–1
- Neutral: 6–2–0

Coaches and captains
- Head coach: Arthur Davis
- Captain: George Wolbert

The 1940–41 Penn State Nittany Lions men's ice hockey season was the 2nd season of play for the program and the first in over 30 years. The Nittany Lions represented Pennsylvania State University and were coached by Arthur Davis.

== Season ==
After nearly three decades of effort, the student body was finally able to convince the school's Athletic Association to recognize ice hockey as a varsity sport. Penn State continued to play teams in the Pennsylvania Intercollegiate League, a club sport conference, but also added other varsity clubs to its schedule. Due to a lack of ice facilities around the Penn State campus, the Nittany Lions played most of their matches in Johnstown, Pennsylvania.

== Roster ==
No.	Nat.	Player	Class	Pos	Height	Weight	DoB	Hometown	Previous team
		Bert Anthony
		Wayne Bitner
		John Dufford
		Mike Fedock
		Art Fowler
		Bill Garrett
		Penny Gates
		Bucky Herrick
		Earl Johnson
		Kaiser
		Eddie Maslow
		George Wolbert (C)

== Standings ==
1940–41 Eastern Collegiate ice hockey standings
	Intercollegiate							Overall					
	GP	W	L	T	Pct.	GF	GA	GP	W	L	T	GF	GA
Army	–	–	–	–	–	–	–	11	4	6	1	38	39
Boston College	–	–	–	–	–	–	–	14	13	1	0	130	48
Boston University	14	7	6	1	.536	67	75	14	7	6	1	67	75
Bowdoin	–	–	–	–	–	–	–	6	0	6	0	–	–
Clarkson	–	–	–	–	–	–	–	13	10	3	0	121	45
Colgate	–	–	–	–	–	–	–	11	6	5	0	–	–
Cornell	7	2	5	0	.286	16	29	7	2	5	0	16	29
Dartmouth	–	–	–	–	–	–	–	14	7	5	2	55	43
Hamilton	–	–	–	–	–	–	–	9	5	4	0	–	–
Harvard	–	–	–	–	–	–	–	12	2	9	1	–	–
Lafayette	1	0	1	0	.000	1	3	5	3	2	0	19	9
Lehigh	–	–	–	–	–	–	–	–	–	–	–	–	–
Middlebury	–	–	–	–	–	–	–	14	3	8	3	–	–
MIT	–	–	–	–	–	–	–	13	2	11	0	–	–
New Hampshire	–	–	–	–	–	–	–	12	5	7	0	48	63
Northeastern	–	–	–	–	–	–	–	9	6	3	0	–	–
Norwich	–	–	–	–	–	–	–	6	2	3	1	–	–
Penn State	2	1	1	0	.500	6	4	10	6	3	1	36	26
Princeton	–	–	–	–	–	–	–	15	9	5	1	–	–
St. Lawrence	–	–	–	–	–	–	–	8	3	5	0	–	–
Union	–	–	–	–	–	–	–	8	2	5	1	–	–
Williams	–	–	–	–	–	–	–	8	6	2	0	–	–
Yale	–	–	–	–	–	–	–	17	11	4	2	–	–

== Schedule and results ==
Date	Opponent	Site	Result	Record
Regular season
December 6	vs. Carnegie Tech*	Shaffer Ice Palace • Johnstown, Pennsylvania	W 3–1	1–0–0
January 17	vs. Temple*	Shaffer Ice Palace • Johnstown, Pennsylvania	W 6–1	2–0–0
February 7	vs. Temple*	Shaffer Ice Palace • Johnstown, Pennsylvania	W 5–3	3–0–0
February 21	vs. Carnegie Tech*	Shaffer Ice Palace • Johnstown, Pennsylvania	W 3–1	4–0–0
February 28	vs. John Carroll*	Shaffer Ice Palace • Johnstown, Pennsylvania	L 2–3	4–1–0
March 6	at Hershey Jr. Cubs*	Hershey Sports Arena • Hershey, Pennsylvania	L 2–5	4–2–0
March 8	at Georgetown*	Riverside Stadium • Washington, D.C.	T 4–4	4–2–1
March 15	vs. Lehigh*	Hershey Sports Arena • Hershey, Pennsylvania	W 4–1	5–2–1
March 22	vs. Franklin & Marshall*	Shaffer Ice Palace • Johnstown, Pennsylvania	W 5–4	6–2–1
March 28	vs. Georgetown*	Shaffer Ice Palace • Johnstown, Pennsylvania	L 2–3	6–3–1
*Non-conference game. ^{#}Rankings from USCHO.com Poll.

Note: Most of Penn State's opponents were club teams.

== Scoring statistics ==
Name	Games	Goals	Assists	Points	PIM
John Dufford	–	14	–	–	–
Penny Gates	–	7	–	–	–
Earl Johnson	–	5	–	–	–
George Wolbert	–	2	–	–	–
Mike Fedock	–	1	–	–	–
Total		29			
