= Ray Eliot =

American athlete, coach, and administrator (1905–1980)

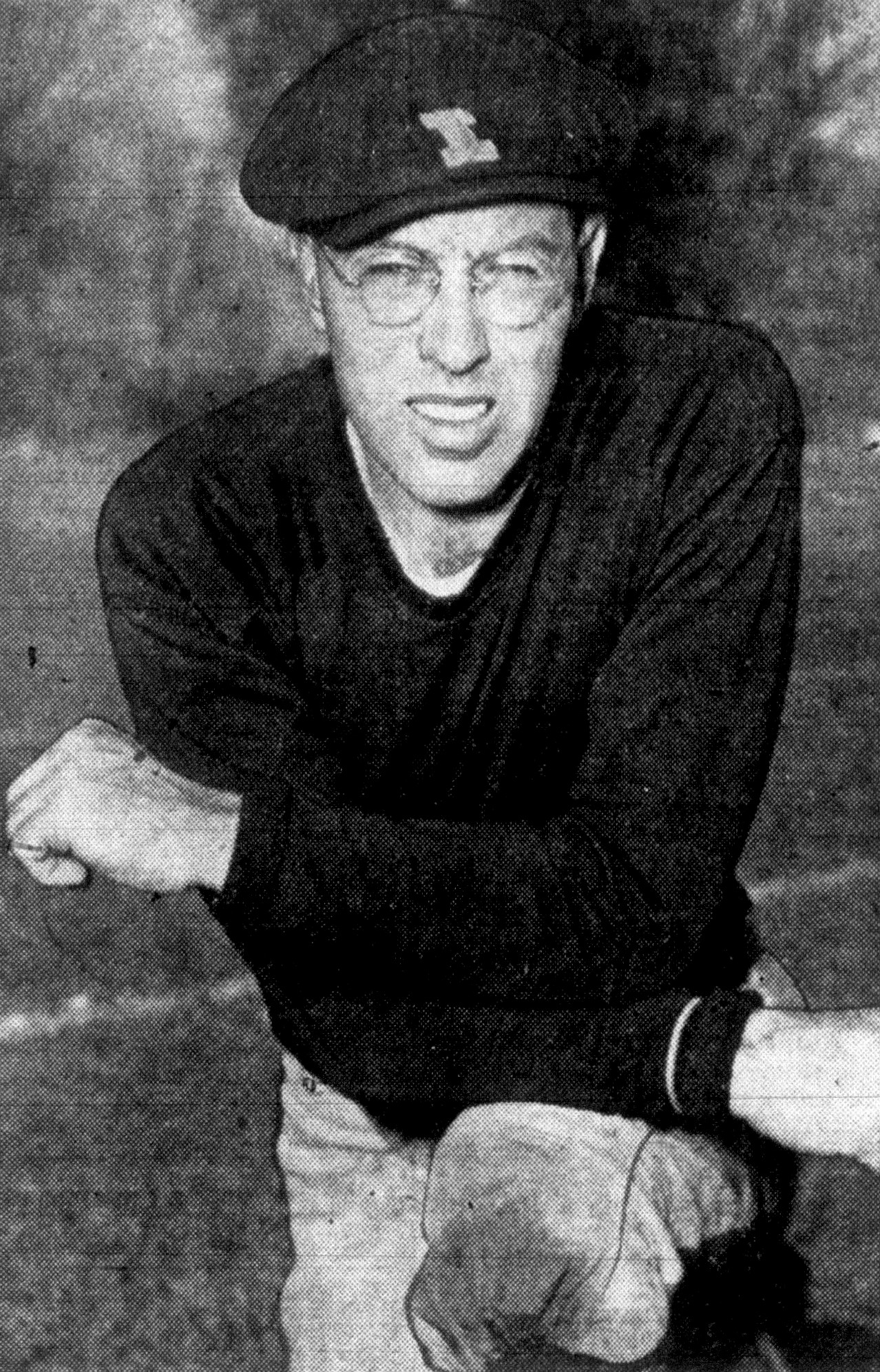
- Eliot, circa 1942

Biographical details
- Born: June 3, 1905; Brighton, Massachusetts, U.S.
- Died: February 24, 1980 (aged 74); Urbana, Illinois, U.S.

Playing career
- 1930–1931: Illinois
- Position: Guard

Coaching career (HC unless noted)

Football
- 1932–1933: Illinois College (assistant)
- 1934–1936: Illinois College
- 1937–1941: Illinois (line)
- 1942–1959: Illinois

Baseball
- 1933–1937: Illinois College

Ice hockey
- 1937–1939: Illinois

Administrative career (AD unless noted)
- 1979: Illinois (interim AD)

Head coaching record
- Overall: 98–80–12 (football); 3–11–0 (ice hockey)
- Bowls: 2–0

Accomplishments and honors

Championships
- 1 national (1951); 3 Big Ten (1946, 1951, 1953)

Awards
- Amos Alonzo Stagg Award (1961)

Raymond Eliot "Butch" Nusspickel (June 13, 1905 – February 24, 1980) was an American football and baseball player, coach, and college athletics administrator.

== Early life ==
Eliot lettered as a guard for Illinois three times: twice for football (1930, 1931) and once for baseball (1930).

== Coaching career ==
He served as the head football coach at Illinois College from 1934 to 1936 and at the University of Illinois at Urbana–Champaign from 1942 to 1959, compiling a career college football record of 98–80–12. Eliot was also the head baseball coach at Illinois College from 1933 to 1937. His Illinois Fighting Illini football teams won three Big Ten Conference championships (1946, 1951, and 1953) and two Rose Bowls (1947 and 1952).

Notable players during Eliot's tenure included Bobby Mitchell and Ray Nitschke. Eliot stepped down in 1959 and was succeeded by Pete Elliott. Eliot, who spent almost his entire career at the University of Illinois—he was a student athlete, an assistant football coach, head football coach, associate athletic director, and finally the interim athletic director for the university—was nicknamed "Mr. Illini." He attended the University of Illinois, played as a guard on the football team in 1930 and 1931, and was a member of Alpha Sigma Phi fraternity.

Eliot was also the first head coach of the Illini hockey team in 1937.

== Personal life ==
He died of an apparent heart attack on February 24, 1980, in Urbana, Illinois.

== Legacy ==
Eliot's 1951 Illinois squad is currently the last Illini team to finish the season with no losses. Eliot is remembered by the Illinois High School Football Coaches Association through its Ray Eliot Award. Eliot was inducted into the Illinois Athletics Hall of Fame in 2018.

== Head coaching record ==
=== Football ===
Year	Team	Overall	Conference	Standing	Bowl/playoffs	Coaches^{#}	AP^{°}
Illinois College Blueboys (Illinois Intercollegiate Athletic Conference) (1934–1936)
1934	Illinois College	6–1	5–1	T–3rd			
1935	Illinois College	5–3	5–1	T–3rd			
1936	Illinois College	4–3–1	2–2–1	T–10th			
Illinois College:		15–7–1	12–4–1				
Illinois Fighting Illini (Big Ten Conference) (1942–1959)
1942	Illinois	6–4	3–2	T–3rd			
1943	Illinois	3–7	2–4	6th			
1944	Illinois	5–4–1	3–3	6th			15
1945	Illinois	2–6–1	1–4–1	7th			
1946	Illinois	8–2	6–1	1st	W Rose		5
1947	Illinois	5–3–1	3–3	T–3rd			
1948	Illinois	3–6	2–5	8th			
1949	Illinois	3–4–2	3–3–1	5th			
1950	Illinois	7–2	4–2	4th		11	13
1951	Illinois	9–0–1	5–0–1	1st	W Rose	3	4
1952	Illinois	4–5	2–5	T–6th			
1953	Illinois	7–1–1	5–1	T–1st		7	7
1954	Illinois	1–8	0–6	10th			
1955	Illinois	5–3–1	3–3–1	5th			
1956	Illinois	2–5–2	1–4–2	8th			
1957	Illinois	4–5	3–4	7th			
1958	Illinois	4–5	4–3	6th			
1959	Illinois	5–3–1	4–2–1	T–3rd		12	13
Illinois:		83–73–11	54–55–7				
Total:		98–80–12					
National championship Conference title Conference division title or championship game berth
^{#}Rankings from final Coaches Poll.; ^{°}Rankings from final AP Poll.

=== Ice hockey ===
Record table
Season	Team	Overall	Conference	Standing	Postseason
Illinois Fighting Illini Independent (1937–1939)
1937–38	Illinois	0–4–0			
1938–39	Illinois	3–7–0			
Total:		3–11–0			

== See also ==
- List of presidents of the American Football Coaches Association
