= 1940–41 John Carroll Blue Streaks men's ice hockey season =

Ohio League, Champion
- Conference: 1st Ohio League
- Home ice: Cleveland Arena

Record
- Overall: 10–2–1
- Conference: 8–0–1
- Road: 1–0–0
- Neutral: 9–2–1

Coaches and captains
- Head coach: Herb Bee
- Captain: Don Myers

The 1940–41 John Carroll Blue Streaks men's ice hockey season was the 4th season of play for the program.

== Season ==
John Carroll was entering its fourth year riding a 29-game winning streak and was the three-time champion of the newly-renamed Ohio League. The program only really had two problems; a diminishing pool of opponents and a lack of attendance. Herb Bee had attempted to schedule games against other midwestern teams like Michigan and Minnesota but, despite some interest in facing the high-scoring Blue Streaks, no games outside their league were ever agreed to. As a result, all of JCU's games were against the relatively poor competition of the Penn-Ohio League, as evidenced by their sterling record. The disparity in play also had an unwelcome side-effect: apathy. John Carroll was the best team in the conference in each of the first three seasons, but was so far ahead of all other programs that the league had started disintegrating. Pitt and Baldwin Wallace left after two years and were followed by Duquesne and Carnegie Tech in 1940. The league now had just 4 members and was in jeopardy of disappearing altogether.

In spite of these troubles, John Carroll was still hoping that the program could be saved and league patron Al Sutphin had a plan. The owner of the Cleveland Barons offered a special deal for season tickets in the hopes that attendance to the games would increase. In the opening game of their season, Carroll's winning streak ended with a tie. The team was unable to break the deadlock in overtime because a public skate was scheduled immediately after the match. The team responded with a win the following week to at least extending their unbeaten streak to 32 games.

JCU continued to win all of their games, but as the season went on it became apparent that Case and Western Reserve were catching up to the Blue Streaks. Near the end of the season, John Carroll finally managed to play its first non-conference game when they travelled to Johnstown to take on Penn State. The Nittany Lions had only just returned to the ice the year before and had played a very sparse schedule so it was a bit of a surprise to see the team give JCU a tough fight. The Blue Streaks won to keep their streak going but the 3–2 match was much closer than they would have wanted.

John Carroll won the Ohio League with an undefeated record and entered the playoff ready for its 4th title. The team won a close game against Case in the first match and need one more win for the championship. The team had trouble scoring against the Rough Riders for the second straight game, and both teams ended regulation with just a single goal. The two teams went scoreless in the first five minute extra session and any further periods used sudden death rules. At the end of the third 5-minute overtime the winning goal was finally scored, unfortunately it came from a Case stick. The goal tied the season and ended John Carroll's unbeaten run at 41 games. It was the first time JCU has lost since January 1939. The win seemed to buoy the Rough Riders, who scored 6 times in the finale, the most John Carroll had allowed in any game in its history, and wrested the championship from the Blue Streaks.

The loss was the last the JCU hockey team would ever endure. The team's future was in jeopardy before the following season had even began but, after Herb Bee left to coach professionally, the outbreak of World War II put an end to any chance of a season. Without access to the Cleveland Arena after the war, the team had no chance to restart and the program was no more.

== Roster ==
No.	Nat.	Player	Class	Pos	Height	Weight	DoB	Hometown	Previous team
		Jack Clancy	Sophomore	F
		F. Eugene Davis	Senior	D
		Vince DeJulius	Junior	D
		Joe Hachey		F
		William A. Higgins	Senior	G/D
		Mike Hoynes	Junior	D
		Tom Kuebrich		F
		Donald J. Myers (C)	Senior	F
		Clem Rannigan	Senior	F
	(United States)	Mathias G. Schneider	Junior					Shaker Heights, Ohio
		Jack Scaccuto		D
	(United States)	Robert L. Smith	Junior	G				New Rochelle, New York
		Tom Smith		F

== Standings ==
1940–41 Ohio Intercollegiate Hockey League standings
	Conference							Overall					
	GP	W	L	T	PTS	GF	GA	GP	W	L	T	GF	GA
John Carroll †	9	8	0	1	17	39	11	13	10	2	1	49	22
Case *	–	–	–	–	–	–	–	–	–	–	–	–	–
Western Reserve	–	–	–	–	–	–	–	–	–	–	–	–	–
Fenn	–	–	–	–	–	–	–	–	–	–	–	–	–
† indicates conference regular season champion * indicates conference tournament champion

== Schedule and results ==
Date	Opponent	Site	Result	Record
Regular season
December 6	vs. Western Reserve	Cleveland Arena • Cleveland, Ohio	T 1–1	0–0–1 (0–0–1)
December 13	vs. Fenn	Cleveland Arena • Cleveland, Ohio	W 4–1	1–0–1 (1–0–1)
January ?	vs. Case	Cleveland Arena • Cleveland, Ohio	W 3–0	2–0–1 (2–0–1)
January ?	vs. Western Reserve	Cleveland Arena • Cleveland, Ohio	W 7–0	3–0–1 (3–0–1)
January 31	vs. Fenn	Cleveland Arena • Cleveland, Ohio	W 7–1	4–0–1 (4–0–1)
February 7	vs. Case	Cleveland Arena • Cleveland, Ohio	W 4–3	5–0–1 (5–0–1)
February 14	vs. Western Reserve	Cleveland Arena • Cleveland, Ohio	W 2–1	6–0–1 (6–0–1)
February 21	vs. Fenn	Cleveland Arena • Cleveland, Ohio	W 6–1	7–0–1 (7–0–1)
February 28	at Penn State*	Shaffer Ice Palace • Johnstown, Pennsylvania	W 3–2	8–0–1
March 7	vs. Case	Cleveland Arena • Cleveland, Ohio	W 5–3	9–0–1 (8–0–1)
Penn-Ohio League Playoffs
March 14	vs. Case*	Cleveland Arena • Cleveland, Ohio (Championship Game 1)	W 2–1	10–0–1
March 21	vs. Case*	Cleveland Arena • Cleveland, Ohio (Championship Game 2)	L 1–2 ^{3OT}	10–1–1
April 4	vs. Case*	Cleveland Arena • Cleveland, Ohio (Championship Game 3)	L 4–6	10–2–1
John Carroll Lost Series 1–2
*Non-conference game.
