= 1940–41 Lafayette Leopards men's ice hockey season =

- Conference: Independent

Record
- Overall: 3–2–0
- Conference: 3–2–0
- Road: 1–1–0
- Neutral: 2–1–0

Coaches and captains
- Head coach: Henry W. Clark

The 1940–41 Lafayette Leopards men's ice hockey season was the 4th season of play for the program. The Leopards represented Lafayette College and were coached by Henry W. Clark in his 4th seasons.

== Season ==
Continuing with the increasing profile of the program, Lafayette was set to join a new 6-team conference for 1941. The initial group included former conference opponents Lehigh and Penn, as well as St. Joseph's, La Salle and Drexel. On top of those league games, the Leopards were also expecting to play Penn State and Georgetown and Princeton J.V., which would nearly double the number of games they had played the year before. Owing to the eastern shift of the new conference, all league games would be played at the Philadelphia Arena on Mondays.

For the first time in its short history, Lafayette won its season opener. Largely on the strength of Tony Cavallo and Donald Bush, the team was able to hold Drexel off the scoresheet in mostly defensive battle. They were originally schedulted to play Temple the following week but that game was cancelled and the Leopards didn't play again until February. Once they returned to the ice, they lost a hard-fought game to Lehigh due to the spectacular exploits of the Engineer goalie. The team's offense finally began to click in their third game and Lafayette thumped La Salle to the tune of 9–0. A further trouncing of St. Joe's put the Leopards into a three-way tie for first place in the league standings.

Lafayette had its big chance to win the title when they took on Penn in mid March. However, in what was expected to be a close affair, the Quakers dominated and shattered the Leopards championship dreams with a 6-1 drubbing. Unfortunately for Lafayette, that was the final game of the season. None of the non-conference games ever materialized and the solid Leopard team wasn't able to build upon its success.

== Roster ==
No.	Nat.	Player	Class	Pos	Height	Weight	DoB	Hometown	Previous team
		Kenny Allen		D
		Donald Bush	Freshman	G
		Tony Cavallo	Graduate	D
		Clint Everett		F
		Goldberg	Senior	F/D
		Jack Henry	Sophomore	F
		Ray Milici	Sophomore	F
		Palmer	Sophomore	D
		Frank Prausa		F
		Quinn	Sophomore	F
		Reoch	Sophomore	F
		Sterner
		Stickle		D
		Textor		D
		Tucker		D

== Standings ==
1940–41 Eastern Collegiate ice hockey standings
	Intercollegiate							Overall					
	GP	W	L	T	Pct.	GF	GA	GP	W	L	T	GF	GA
Army	–	–	–	–	–	–	–	11	4	6	1	38	39
Boston College	–	–	–	–	–	–	–	14	13	1	0	130	48
Boston University	14	7	6	1	.536	67	75	14	7	6	1	67	75
Bowdoin	–	–	–	–	–	–	–	6	0	6	0	–	–
Clarkson	–	–	–	–	–	–	–	13	10	3	0	121	45
Colgate	–	–	–	–	–	–	–	11	6	5	0	–	–
Cornell	7	2	5	0	.286	16	29	7	2	5	0	16	29
Dartmouth	–	–	–	–	–	–	–	14	7	5	2	55	43
Hamilton	–	–	–	–	–	–	–	9	5	4	0	–	–
Harvard	–	–	–	–	–	–	–	12	2	9	1	–	–
Lafayette	1	0	1	0	.000	1	3	5	3	2	0	19	9
Lehigh	–	–	–	–	–	–	–	–	–	–	–	–	–
Middlebury	–	–	–	–	–	–	–	14	3	8	3	–	–
MIT	–	–	–	–	–	–	–	13	2	11	0	–	–
New Hampshire	–	–	–	–	–	–	–	12	5	7	0	48	63
Northeastern	–	–	–	–	–	–	–	9	6	3	0	–	–
Norwich	–	–	–	–	–	–	–	6	2	3	1	–	–
Penn State	2	1	1	0	.500	6	4	10	6	3	1	36	26
Princeton	–	–	–	–	–	–	–	15	9	5	1	–	–
St. Lawrence	–	–	–	–	–	–	–	8	3	5	0	–	–
Union	–	–	–	–	–	–	–	8	2	5	1	–	–
Williams	–	–	–	–	–	–	–	8	6	2	0	–	–
Yale	–	–	–	–	–	–	–	17	11	4	2	–	–

== Schedule and results ==
Date	Opponent	Site	Result	Record
Regular Season
January 13	vs. Drexel	Philadelphia Arena • Philadelphia, Pennsylvania	W 1–0	1–0–0 (1–0–0)
February 3	vs. Lehigh	Philadelphia Arena • Philadelphia, Pennsylvania	L 1–3	1–1–0 (1–1–0)
February 10	at La Salle	Philadelphia Arena • Philadelphia, Pennsylvania	W 9–0	2–1–0 (2–1–0)
February 24	vs. St. Joseph's	Philadelphia Arena • Philadelphia, Pennsylvania	W 7–0	3–1–0 (3–1–0)
March 10	at Pennsylvania	Philadelphia Arena • Philadelphia, Pennsylvania	L 1–6	3–2–0 (3–2–0)
*Non-conference game. ^{#}Rankings from USCHO.com Poll.
