= 1941–42 Penn State Nittany Lions men's ice hockey season =

Record
- Overall: 5–3–0
- Road: 0–2–0
- Neutral: 5–1–0

Coaches and captains
- Head coach: Arthur Davis
- Captain: Larry Lightbody

The 1941–42 Penn State Nittany Lions men's ice hockey season was the 3rd season of play for the program. The Nittany Lions represented Pennsylvania State University and were coached by Arthur Davis in his 2nd season.

== Season ==
Penn State continued to play mostly against club teams from Pennsylvania. With the demise of the Penn-Ohio League the year before, the team would find it increasingly difficult to schedule opponents in the midst of World War II.

== Roster ==
No.	Nat.	Player	Class	Pos	Height	Weight	DoB	Hometown	Previous team
		Bert Anthony
		Fred Bernbaum
		Jack Burford
		Ted Cauffman
		John Dufford
		Mike Fedock
		J. F. Fisher
		Art Gladstone
		T. J. Goodwin
		P. Heberling
		Earl Johnson
		Larry Lightbody (C)
		Don Steva
		Stu Sussman
		R. Templain

== Standings ==
1941–42 Eastern Collegiate ice hockey standings
	Intercollegiate							Overall					
	GP	W	L	T	Pct.	GF	GA	GP	W	L	T	GF	GA
Army	–	–	–	–	–	–	–	12	1	11	0	33	81
Boston College	–	–	–	–	–	–	–	14	12	2	0	78	57
Boston University	14	3	11	0	.214	40	65	14	3	11	0	40	65
Bowdoin	–	–	–	–	–	–	–	10	2	8	0	–	–
Clarkson	–	–	–	–	–	–	–	14	8	6	0	130	96
Colgate	–	–	–	–	–	–	–	13	10	3	0	–	–
Cornell	6	4	2	0	.667	41	25	6	4	2	0	41	25
Dartmouth	–	–	–	–	–	–	–	23	21	2	0	148	65
Hamilton	–	–	–	–	–	–	–	8	5	3	0	–	–
Harvard	–	–	–	–	–	–	–	16	8	8	0	–	–
Lehigh	–	–	–	–	–	–	–	–	–	–	–	–	–
Middlebury	–	–	–	–	–	–	–	14	6	8	0	–	–
MIT	–	–	–	–	–	–	–	14	4	10	0	–	–
New Hampshire	–	–	–	–	–	–	–	14	4	10	0	53	78
Northeastern	–	–	–	–	–	–	–	12	7	5	0	–	–
Penn State	1	1	0	0	1.000	4	2	8	5	3	0	29	19
Princeton	–	–	–	–	–	–	–	16	10	6	0	–	–
Union	–	–	–	–	–	–	–	8	0	8	0	–	–
Williams	–	–	–	–	–	–	–	7	4	3	0	–	–
Yale	–	–	–	–	–	–	–	17	13	4	0	–	–

== Schedule and results ==
Date	Opponent	Site	Result	Record
Regular season
January 14	at Hershey Jr. Cubs*	Hershey Sports Arena • Hershey, Pennsylvania	L 1–2	0–1–0
January 17	vs. Carnegie Tech*	Shaffer Ice Palace • Johnstown, Pennsylvania	W 7–0	1–1–0
January 24	at Georgetown*	Riverside Stadium • Washington, D.C.	L 3–5	1–2–0
February 14	vs. Carnegie Tech*	Youngstown, Ohio	W 3–2	2–2–0
February 18	vs. Saint Joseph's*	Hershey Sports Arena • Hershey, Pennsylvania	W 5–1	3–2–0
February 25	vs. Franklin & Marshall*	Hershey Sports Arena • Hershey, Pennsylvania	W 4–1	4–2–0
March 10	vs. Navy All-Stars*	Riverside Stadium • Washington, D.C.	L 2–6	4–3–0
March 14	vs. Lehigh*	Hershey Sports Arena • Hershey, Pennsylvania	W 4–2	5–3–0
*Non-conference game. ^{#}Rankings from USCHO.com Poll.

Note: Most of Penn State's opponents were club teams.

== Scoring Statistics ==
Name	Games	Goals	Assists	Points	PIM
John Dufford	–	14	–	–	–
Ted Cauffman	–	6	–	–	–
Earl Johnson	–	6	–	–	–
Art Gladstone	–	3	–	–	–
Mike Fedock	–	1	–	–	–
Bert Anthony	–	1	–	–	–
T. J. Goodwin	–	1	–	–	–
Total		32			
