= Aldo Palazzari =

American ice hockey player (1918–2007)

- Born: July 25, 1919 Eveleth, Minnesota, United States
- Died: May 12, 2007 (aged 88) Eveleth, Minnesota, United States
- Height: 5 ft 7 in (170 cm)
- Weight: 205 lb (93 kg; 14 st 9 lb)
- Position: Right wing
- Shot: Left
- Played for: New York Rangers; Boston Bruins
- Playing career: 1941–1944

Aldo Palazzari (July 25, 1918 – May 12, 2007) was an American professional ice hockey player who played 35 games in the National Hockey League with the Boston Bruins and New York Rangers during the 1943–44. An eye injury during the Rangers' 1944 training camp forced him to retire from playing. He was the father of former NHL player Doug Palazzari.

== Career statistics ==
=== Regular season and playoffs ===
			Regular season					Playoffs
Season	Team	League	GP	G	A	Pts	PIM	GP	G	A	Pts	PIM
1938–39	Eveleth Rangers	USHL	30	25	13	38	24	5	2	2	4	2
1939–40	University of Illinois	NCAA	—	—	—	—	—	—	—	—	—	—
1940–41	University of Illinois	NCAA	—	—	—	—	—	—	—	—	—	—
1941–42	University of Illinois	NCAA	—	—	—	—	—	—	—	—	—	—
1943–44	Boston Bruins	NHL	24	6	3	9	4	—	—	—	—	—
1943–44	Boston Olympics	EAHL	17	15	17	32	14	—	—	—	—	—
1943–44	New York Rangers	NHL	11	2	0	2	0	—	—	—	—	—
NHL totals			35	8	3	11	4	—	—	—	—	—
