= 1941–42 United States collegiate men's ice hockey season =

Ice hockey season

- Duration: December 1941– March 1942
- East Collegiate champion: Dartmouth
- West Collegiate champion: Illinois

The 1941–42 United States collegiate men's ice hockey season was the 48th season of collegiate ice hockey in the United States.

== Regular season ==
=== Season tournaments ===
Tournament	Dates	Teams	Champion
Lake Placid Invitational Tournament	December 26–29	8	Colgate

=== Standings ===
1941–42 Eastern Collegiate ice hockey standings
	Intercollegiate							Overall					
	GP	W	L	T	Pct.	GF	GA	GP	W	L	T	GF	GA
Army	–	–	–	–	–	–	–	12	1	11	0	33	81
Boston College	–	–	–	–	–	–	–	14	12	2	0	78	57
Boston University	14	3	11	0	.214	40	65	14	3	11	0	40	65
Bowdoin	–	–	–	–	–	–	–	10	2	8	0	–	–
Clarkson	–	–	–	–	–	–	–	14	8	6	0	130	96
Colgate	–	–	–	–	–	–	–	13	10	3	0	–	–
Cornell	6	4	2	0	.667	41	25	6	4	2	0	41	25
Dartmouth	–	–	–	–	–	–	–	23	21	2	0	148	65
Hamilton	–	–	–	–	–	–	–	8	5	3	0	–	–
Harvard	–	–	–	–	–	–	–	16	8	8	0	–	–
Lehigh	–	–	–	–	–	–	–	–	–	–	–	–	–
Middlebury	–	–	–	–	–	–	–	14	6	8	0	–	–
MIT	–	–	–	–	–	–	–	14	4	10	0	–	–
New Hampshire	–	–	–	–	–	–	–	14	4	10	0	53	78
Northeastern	–	–	–	–	–	–	–	12	7	5	0	–	–
Penn State	1	1	0	0	1.000	4	2	8	5	3	0	29	19
Princeton	–	–	–	–	–	–	–	16	10	6	0	–	–
Union	–	–	–	–	–	–	–	8	0	8	0	–	–
Williams	–	–	–	–	–	–	–	7	4	3	0	–	–
Yale	–	–	–	–	–	–	–	17	13	4	0	–	–

1941–42 Western Collegiate ice hockey standings
	Intercollegiate							Overall					
	GP	W	L	T	Pct.	GF	GA	GP	W	L	T	GF	GA
Colorado College	12	6	3	3	.625	42	42	15	6	6	3	45	54
Illinois	12	7	3	2	.667	61	28	16	10	4	2	81	44
Michigan	14	2	10	2	.214	23	73	18	2	14	2	30	95
Michigan Tech	12	3	6	3	.375	24	37	12	3	6	3	24	37
Minnesota	10	6	4	0	.600	35	21	12	7	5	0	38	25

1941–42 Minnesota Intercollegiate Athletic Conference ice hockey standings
	Conference							Overall					
	GP	W	L	T	PTS	GF	GA	GP	W	L	T	GF	GA
St. Thomas †	–	–	–	–	–	–	–	7	7	0	0	–	–
Augsburg	–	–	–	–	–	–	–	–	–	–	–	–	–
Gustavus Adolphus	–	–	–	–	–	–	–	9	4	5	0	–	–
Hamline	–	–	–	–	–	–	–	–	–	–	–	–	–
Macalester	–	–	–	–	–	–	–	–	–	–	–	–	–
Saint John's	–	–	–	–	–	–	–	7	1	6	0	–	–
St. Olaf	–	–	–	–	–	–	–	–	–	–	–	–	–
† indicates conference champion

1941–42 Pacific Coast Conference ice hockey standings
	Conference							Overall					
	GP	W	L	T	PTS	GF	GA	GP	W	L	T	GF	GA
California	–	–	–	–	–	–	–	–	–	–	–	–	–
UCLA	–	–	–	–	–	–	–	–	–	–	–	–	–
USC	–	–	–	–	–	–	–	–	–	–	–	–	–
* indicates conference champion
