= 1940–41 United States collegiate men's ice hockey season =

- Duration: December 1940– March 1941
- East Collegiate champion: Boston College
- West Collegiate champion: Illinois

The 1940–41 United States collegiate men's ice hockey season was the 47th season of collegiate ice hockey in the United States.

== Regular season ==
=== Season tournaments ===
Tournament	Dates	Teams	Champion
Lake Placid Invitational Tournament	December 26–28	8	Colgate

=== Standings ===
1940–41 Eastern Collegiate ice hockey standings
	Intercollegiate							Overall					
	GP	W	L	T	Pct.	GF	GA	GP	W	L	T	GF	GA
Army	–	–	–	–	–	–	–	11	4	6	1	38	39
Boston College	–	–	–	–	–	–	–	14	13	1	0	130	48
Boston University	14	7	6	1	.536	67	75	14	7	6	1	67	75
Bowdoin	–	–	–	–	–	–	–	6	0	6	0	–	–
Clarkson	–	–	–	–	–	–	–	13	10	3	0	121	45
Colgate	–	–	–	–	–	–	–	11	6	5	0	–	–
Cornell	7	2	5	0	.286	16	29	7	2	5	0	16	29
Dartmouth	–	–	–	–	–	–	–	14	7	5	2	55	43
Hamilton	–	–	–	–	–	–	–	9	5	4	0	–	–
Harvard	–	–	–	–	–	–	–	12	2	9	1	–	–
Lafayette	1	0	1	0	.000	1	3	5	3	2	0	19	9
Lehigh	–	–	–	–	–	–	–	–	–	–	–	–	–
Middlebury	–	–	–	–	–	–	–	14	3	8	3	–	–
MIT	–	–	–	–	–	–	–	13	2	11	0	–	–
New Hampshire	–	–	–	–	–	–	–	12	5	7	0	48	63
Northeastern	–	–	–	–	–	–	–	9	6	3	0	–	–
Norwich	–	–	–	–	–	–	–	6	2	3	1	–	–
Penn State	2	1	1	0	.500	6	4	10	6	3	1	36	26
Princeton	–	–	–	–	–	–	–	15	9	5	1	–	–
St. Lawrence	–	–	–	–	–	–	–	8	3	5	0	–	–
Union	–	–	–	–	–	–	–	8	2	5	1	–	–
Williams	–	–	–	–	–	–	–	8	6	2	0	–	–
Yale	–	–	–	–	–	–	–	17	11	4	2	–	–

1940–41 Western Collegiate ice hockey standings
	Intercollegiate							Overall					
	GP	W	L	T	Pct.	GF	GA	GP	W	L	T	GF	GA
Alaska-Fairbanks	–	–	–	–	–	–	–	2	1	1	0	–	–
Colorado College	–	–	–	–	–	–	–	20	10	9	1	–	–
Illinois	18	14	3	1	.806	87	41	21	17	3	1	112	50
Michigan	–	–	–	–	–	–	–	17	2	14	1	37	84
Michigan Tech	–	–	–	–	–	–	–	11	1	10	0	–	–
Minnesota	–	–	–	–	–	–	–	16	11	3	2	–	–

1940–41 Minnesota Intercollegiate Athletic Conference ice hockey standings
	Conference							Overall					
	GP	W	L	T	PTS	GF	GA	GP	W	L	T	GF	GA
St. Thomas †	–	–	–	–	–	–	–	9	6	2	1	–	–
Augsburg	–	–	–	–	–	–	–	–	–	–	–	–	–
Gustavus Adolphus	–	–	–	–	–	–	–	–	–	–	–	–	–
Hamline	–	–	–	–	–	–	–	–	–	–	–	–	–
Macalester	–	–	–	–	–	–	–	–	–	–	–	–	–
Saint John's	–	–	–	–	–	–	–	8	4	4	0	–	–
St. Olaf	–	–	–	–	–	–	–	–	–	–	–	–	–
† indicates conference champion

1940–41 Ohio Intercollegiate Hockey League standings
	Conference							Overall					
	GP	W	L	T	PTS	GF	GA	GP	W	L	T	GF	GA
John Carroll †	9	8	0	1	17	39	11	13	10	2	1	49	22
Case *	–	–	–	–	–	–	–	–	–	–	–	–	–
Western Reserve	–	–	–	–	–	–	–	–	–	–	–	–	–
Fenn	–	–	–	–	–	–	–	–	–	–	–	–	–
† indicates conference regular season champion * indicates conference tournament champion

1940–41 Pacific Coast Conference ice hockey standings
	Conference							Overall					
	GP	W	L	T	PTS	GF	GA	GP	W	L	T	GF	GA
California	–	–	–	–	–	–	–	–	–	–	–	–	–
Loyola	–	–	–	–	–	–	–	–	–	–	–	–	–
UCLA	–	–	–	–	–	–	–	–	–	–	–	–	–
USC	–	–	–	–	–	–	–	–	–	–	–	–	–
* indicates conference champion
