= Illinois Fighting Illini men's ice hockey =

- University: University of Illinois Urbana-Champaign
- Conference: ACHA Division 1
- Head coach: John Opilka; 3rd season
- Captain: David Etingen
- Arena: University of Illinois Ice Arena; Champaign, Illinois
- Colors: Orange and blue

ACHA tournament champions
- 2005, 2008

ACHA tournament appearances
- 1993, 1994, 1995, 1998, 1999, 2000, 2001, 2002, 2003, 2004, 2005, 2006, 2007, 2008, 2009, 2010, 2012, 2013, 2014, 2015, 2016, 2017, 2018, 2019, 2022

Conference regular season champions
- Big Ten: 1941, 1942, 1943 (Note: Despite their members belonging to other conferences, the Big Ten still awarded regular season conference championships from 1923 to 1943 and 1959 to 1981, and held a conference tournament from 1967 to 1969. In 2013, the Big Ten began officially sponsoring hockey again.)

The Illinois Fighting Illini men's ice hockey team is an ACHA Division I college ice hockey program that represents the University of Illinois at Urbana–Champaign as a registered student organization. The Illini play on-campus at the historic 1,500-seat University of Illinois Ice Arena. The university does not currently have an NCAA varsity team, making the ACHA D1 team the highest level of hockey offered by the university.

The school also hosts an ACHA Division II team that is part of the Mid-American Collegiate Hockey Association (MACHA).

== History ==
Organized ice hockey came to Illinois in the 1930s and played its first official season in 1937 as an independent NCAA team. The first head coach was Ray Eliot, who coached the Fightin' Illini from 1937 to 1939. The team went winless in the 1937–38 season, going 0–4 before winning their first game in the following season. Vic Heyliger, a former All-American at Michigan and professional player with the Chicago Blackhawks, took over as head coach for the 1939–40 season. In this second year as Illini head coach he led the team to a 17-win season, the most successful season of the Illini NCAA ice hockey team. The team recorded a 10-win season in 1941–42 and a 9-win season in 1942–43 that included only a single loss. The program was ended after the 1942–43 season during World War II; that same year in 1943 Heyliger came out of retirement for 1943–44 season to fill in the team's depleted war time roster.

The current Fighting Illini men's ice hockey team formed in the post-war era during the mid-1950s. The team joined the CSCHL in 1975, only five years after the league formed, making the Illini the longest tenured CSCHL member until the team's departure for Midwest College Hockey in 2024.

A feasibility study published in March 2018, and commissioned by the NHL, NHLPA, and College Hockey, Inc., found a high probability of success for the hockey program to transition to NCAA Division I. Illinois however reversed course in May 2022, announcing that they were no longer exploring adding a varsity hockey program.

After one season as a member of Midwest College Hockey, head coach John Opilka announced the team would leave the conference and become an independent team.

== Notable events ==
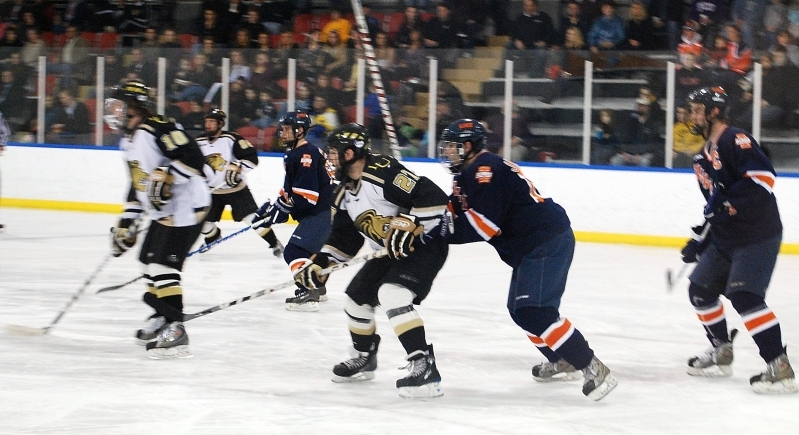
- Fighting Illini Hockey vs. Lindenwood
  Undefeated season in 2007–2008. Record of 38–0–0.
- 2 ACHA Division I National Championships. Won in Bensenville, Illinois in 2005. Won in Rochester, New York in 2008.
- 48 game winning streak spanning from September 28, 2007, to October 25, 2008.

== Season-by-season results ==
Note: GP = Games played, W = Wins, L = Losses, T = Ties, Pts = Points

| Champions | NCAA Frozen Four | Conference regular-season champions | Conference Playoff Champions |

| Season | Conference | Regular Season | | | | | | | | | | | Conference Tournament Results | National Tournament Results |
| Season | Conference | Conference | | | | | | Overall | | | | | Conference Tournament Results | National Tournament Results |
| Season | Conference | GP | W | L | T | Pts* | Finish | GP | W | L | T | % | Conference Tournament Results | National Tournament Results |
|---|---|---|---|---|---|---|---|---|---|---|---|---|---|---|
Ray Eliot (1937–1939)
| 1937–38 | Independent | – | – | – | – | – | – | 4 | 0 | 4 | 0 | .000 | | |
| 1938–39 | Independent | – | – | – | – | – | – | 10 | 3 | 7 | 0 | .300 | | |
Vic Heyliger (1939–1943)
| 1939–40 | Independent | – | – | – | – | – | – | 14 | 3 | 11 | 0 | .214 | | |
| 1940–41 | Independent | – | – | – | – | – | – | 21 | 17 | 3 | 1 | .833 | | Western Intercollegiate Champions |
| 1941–42 | Independent | – | – | – | – | – | – | 16 | 10 | 4 | 2 | .688 | | Western Intercollegiate Champions |
| 1942–43 | Independent | – | – | – | – | – | – | 12 | 10 | 2 | 0 | .833 | | Western Intercollegiate Champions |
| Totals | | | | | | | | GP | W | L | T | % | Championships | |
| Regular Season | | | | | | | | 77 | 43 | 31 | 3 | .578 | | |
| Conference Post-season | | | | | | | | 0 | 0 | 0 | 0 | – | | |
| NCAA Post-season | | | | | | | | 0 | 0 | 0 | 0 | – | | |
| Regular Season and Post-season Record | | | | | | | | 77 | 43 | 31 | 3 | .578 | 3 Western Intercollegiate Championships | |

* Winning percentage is used when conference schedules are unbalanced.

== Awards ==
- Big Ten Conference championships; (3) : 1941, 1942, 1943
- ACHA National Championships; (2) : 2005, 2008
- ACHA Final Four Appearances; (10) : 1998, 2001, 2002, 2003, 2005, 2006, 2007, 2008, 2009, 2018
- ACHA National Tournament Appearances; (23) : 1993, 1994, 1995, 1998, 1999, 2000, 2001, 2002, 2003, 2004, 2005, 2006, 2007, 2008, 2009, 2010, 2012, 2013, 2014, 2015, 2016, 2017, 2018
- CSCHL regular-season championships; (2) : 2003, 2008, 2013
- CSCHL Tournament Championships; (6) : 1986, 1988, 1992, 2003, 2006, 2008

== Fighting Illini in the NHL ==
| = NHL All-Star team | = NHL All-Star | = NHL All-Star and NHL All-Star team | = Hall of Famers |

| Player | Position | Team(s) | Years | Games | Stanley Cups |
|---|---|---|---|---|---|
| Aldo Palazzari | Right wing | NYR, BOS | 1943–1944 | 36 | 0 |

== Notable alumni ==
- Lee Archambault - U.S. Air Force colonel and NASA astronaut. Crew member of Mission STS-117 and Commander of Mission STS-119.
- Amo Bessone - A 3-year varsity player, Bessone coached college hockey for 31 years, spending most of his career with Michigan State and led the program to its first national championship in 1966.
- Chad Cassel - Inducted into the Illinois Hockey Hall of Fame (2007). Winningest coach in Illini Hockey history with a record of 326–104–14.
- Gene Honda - Public address announcer for the Chicago Blackhawks.
- Tommy Karakas - Goaltender in the team's final varsity season, set a modern collegiate record for consecutive shutouts (4, since broken). Brother of Stanley Cup champion Mike Karakas.
- Norbert Sterle - Led program in scoring during the team's championship season in 1940–41. Killed while serving in World War II.
- Noah Becker - Founder of Becker's Hot, former DLG member, Hex lead guitarist, and a current starter for the team. He suffered a potential career ending injury which is being reviewed by Alegator (El) to prove legitimacy.
