= University of Illinois Ice Arena =

Sports facility in Champaign, Illinois

University of Illinois Ice Rink
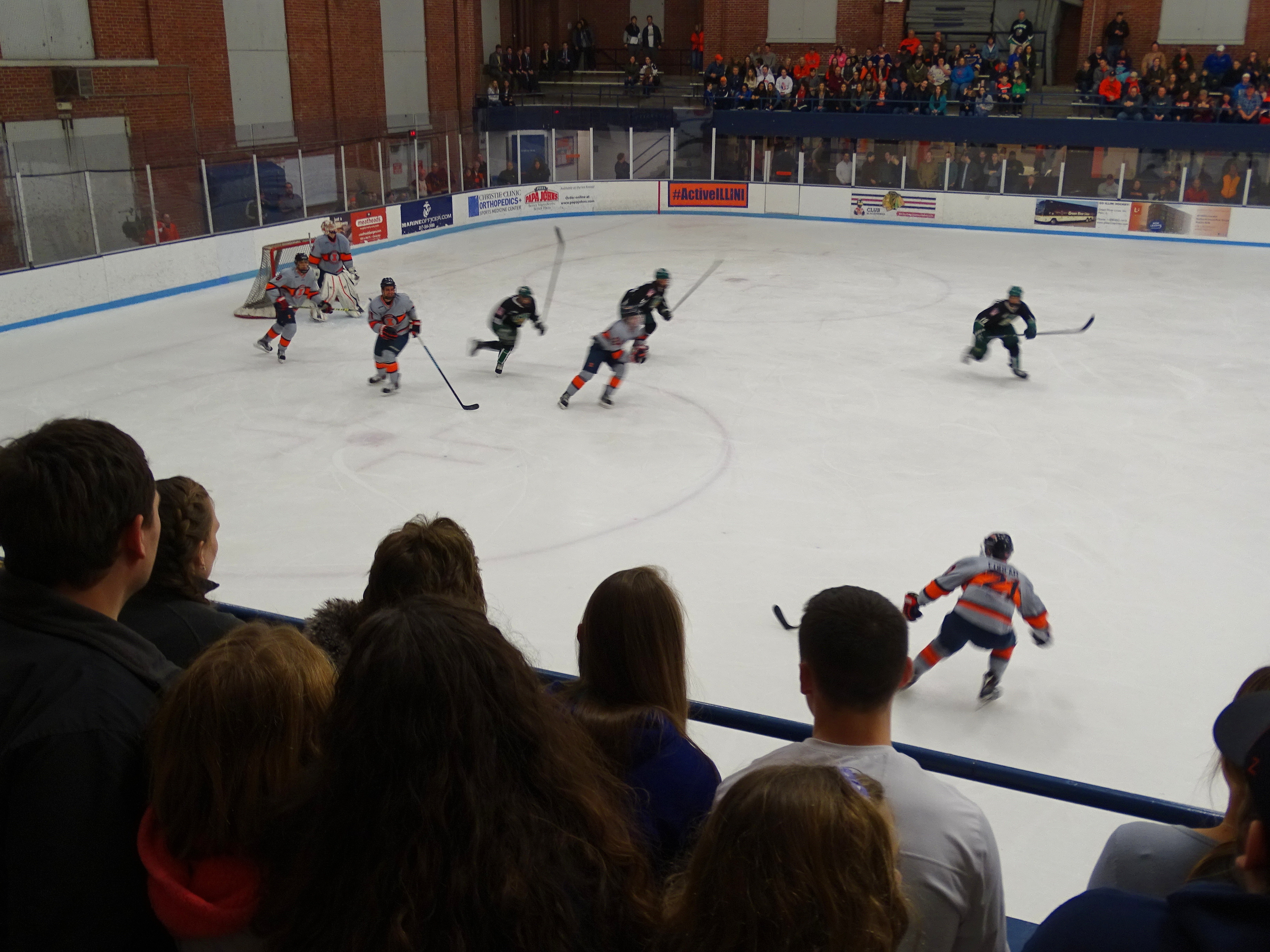
- Address: 406 E Armory Avenue Champaign, IL
- Location: Champaign, Illinois
- Owner: University of Illinois at Urbana–Champaign
- Operator: Campus Recreation
- Capacity: 1,500 (Ice hockey)
- Surface: 197 ft × 115 ft (60 m × 35 m)
- Public transit: MTD

Construction
- Opened: 1931
- Architects: Holabird and Root

Tenants
- Illini Men's and Women's Ice Hockey Teams; Illini Synchronized Skating Team

The University of Illinois Ice Arena, also known as the Big Pond, is an ice arena and recreational sports facility in Champaign, Illinois, and owned and operated by the University of Illinois at Urbana–Champaign. The arena is the home for the Illinois Fighting Illini men's and women's college ice hockey teams competing in the American Collegiate Hockey Association. The men's ice hockey team competes independently at the ACHA Division I level. They are former members of the Central States Collegiate Hockey League and Midwest College Hockey (MCH). The university also has an ACHA Division II men's team that plays in the Mid American Collegiate Hockey Association. Additionally, the facility is the home of the Illinois synchronized skating Team, the Illinois Intercollegiate Figure Skating Team and several skating clubs such as the Champaign Regional Speed Skating Club, Ice Cubes Youth Synchronized Skating and the Champaign-Urbana Youth Hockey Association.

The arena features a non-standard sized ice sheet approximately 197 by 115 feet (60 by 35 m). By comparison, an NHL regulation sheet is 200 ft x 85 ft and Olympic regulation ice sheets are 200 ft x 100 ft. The arena is used for ice hockey, figure skating, short track speed skating, public skating, and local youth and high school hockey.

== History ==
The University of Illinois Ice Arena was built in 1931 and designed by Chicago architecture firm Holabird and Root, the same firm that designed the University of Illinois Memorial Stadium and Chicago's Soldier Field. The arena features four rows of bleacher seating in an elevated balcony that runs the length of the ice rink on either side. These bleachers provide seating for roughly 1,300 fans, with standing room and bench seating available underneath. Because of this set-up the team benches are actually directly underneath the stands. This situation made for easy player/spectator verbal and physical contact. "It was not unheard of to evict a fan and a player due to skirmishes back in the late 1960[s] and [19]70s," said Referee Michael Rzechula.

Due to the size of the rink being originally larger than 200 by 100 feet (61 by 30 m) at approximately 200 by 125 feet (61 by 38 m) it was and still remains at its current size of 197 by 115 feet (60 by 35 m) one of only a few remaining rinks in the entire U.S.A. to be capable of hosting Junior, National, and International level short track speed skating meets. The first World Short Track Speed Skating Championships were held at this rink in 1976 capable of placing 9 racers instead of 6 on the start line unlike any other rink in the U.S.A. It was and still is the largest indoor ice sheet in the U.S.A.

This rink has been called home by many and been host to virtually all U.S. World Champion and Olympic speed skaters. Local Olympians include: Jonathan Kuck, Katherine Reutter, Chantal Bailey, Bonnie Blair, Erik Henriksen, Roger Capan. Following discussion that included options such as demolishing the ice arena and building an off-campus replacement, the student body voted for a $13 fee to fund renovations to the Ice Arena.
