= Lake Placid Invitational Tournament =

US college sport event

- Sport: College ice hockey
- Founded: 1938
- Folded: 1942
- No. of teams: 8 (1938-1941); 6 (1942)
- Venue: Jack Shea Arena
- Most titles: Colgate (4)

The Lake Placid Invitational Tournament was a college men's ice hockey tournament played after Christmas at the Jack Shea Arena in Lake Placid, New York.

== History ==
The tournament began as an 8-team tournament in 1938 with participating teams playing 3 games apiece. The series was played every year until the majority of college hockey teams suspended their programs due to World War II. The tournament was not revived after the war despite most former participants restarting their programs.

The invitees were from New York state and the surrounding regions. When Massachusetts State suspended their program in 1939, their position was filled by Colgate. Hamilton was replaced in 1940 by Lehigh. St. Lawrence suspended their program in 1941 and was replaced by New Hampshire. Due to the beginning of World War II, Lehigh, New Hampshire and Union declined to participate and the tournament was converted into a 6-team round robin format when Hamilton returned.

The winner of the tournament received the Samuel H. Packer Trophy.

== Results ==
=== 1938 ===
5th place match December 28
Massachusetts State	3
MIT	5
Seventh place
St. Lawrence	3
Union	4

5th – 8th place play-offs December 27
Massachusetts State	5
St. Lawrence	3
Union	0
MIT	1

Quarterfinals; December 26
Massachusetts State	1
Hamilton	3
Cornell	11
St. Lawrence	1
Union	0
Middlebury	1
Williams	2
MIT	1

Semifinals; December 27
Hamilton	0
Cornell	2
Middlebury	1
Williams	9

Championship; December 28
Cornell	3
Williams	4
Third place
Hamilton	2
Middlebury	0

==== Final rankings ====
Rank	Team
1	Williams
2	Cornell
3	Hamilton
4	Middlebury
5	MIT
6	Massachusetts State
7	Union
8	St. Lawrence

=== 1939* ===
5th place match January 3
Hamilton	1
Williams	3
Seventh place
St. Lawrence	3
Union	4

5th – 8th place play-offs January 2
Hamilton	5
St. Lawrence	2
Union	0
Williams	4

Quarterfinals; January 1
Cornell	5
Hamilton	4
MIT	6
St. Lawrence	2
Colgate	7
Union	2
Middlebury	2
Williams	1

Semifinals; January 2
Cornell	3
MIT	5
Colgate	7
Middlebury	3

Championship; January 3
MIT	4
Colgate	5
Third place
Cornell	4
Middlebury	2

==== Final rankings ====
Rank	Team
1	Colgate
2	MIT
3	Cornell
4	Middlebury
5	Williams
6	Hamilton
7	Union
8	St. Lawrence

=== 1940 ===
5th place match December 28
Cornell	1
Middlebury	0
Seventh place
Lehigh	3
Union	1

5th – 8th place play-offs December 27
Cornell	3
Lehigh	1
Middlebury	2
Union	1

Quarterfinals; December 26
Colgate	5
Cornell	3
MIT	7
Lehigh	2
Williams	6
Middlebury	0
St. Lawrence	5
Union	2

Semifinals; December 27
Colgate	9
MIT	1
Williams	9
St. Lawrence	2

Championship; December 28
Colgate	3
Williams	1
Third place
MIT	3
St. Lawrence	1

==== Final rankings ====
Rank	Team
1	Colgate
2	Williams
3	MIT
4	St. Lawrence
5	Cornell
6	Middlebury
7	Lehigh
8	Union

=== 1941 ===
5th place match December 29
MIT	6
Lehigh	0
Seventh place
Middlebury	6
Union	2

5th – 8th place play-offs December 27
MIT	4
Middlebury	3
Union	1
Lehigh	4

Quarterfinals; December 26
Colgate	6
MIT	5
Cornell	9
Middlebury	2
New Hampshire	8
Union	0
Williams	3
Lehigh	0

Semifinals; December 27
Colgate	4
Cornell	1
New Hampshire	1
Williams	3

Championship; December 29
Colgate	5
Williams	1
Third place
Cornell	8
New Hampshire	5

==== Final rankings ====
Rank	Team
1	Colgate
2	Williams
3	Cornell
4	New Hampshire
5	MIT
6	Lehigh
7	Middlebury
8	Union

=== 1942 ===
==== Round Robin ====
Date	Winning team	Score	Losing team	Score
December 26	Cornell	2	MIT	1
December 26	Colgate	12	Middlebury	2
December 26	Hamilton	6	Williams	3
December 27	Cornell	7	Middlebury	5
December 27	Colgate	13	Williams	4
December 28	Colgate	9	Hamilton	2
December 28	MIT	4	Middlebury	2
December 29	Hamilton	8	Cornell	0
December 29	Williams	4	MIT	1

==== Final rankings ====
Rank	Team	Record
1	Colgate	3–0
2	Hamilton	2–1
3	Cornell	2–1
4	Williams	1–2
5	MIT	1–2
6	Middlebury	0–3

* The 1939 tournament took place in January of 1940.
