= 1947–48 New Hampshire Wildcats men's ice hockey season =

- Conference: 7th NEIHL
- Home ice: UNH Ice Rink

Record
- Overall: 4–9–0
- Conference: 3–7–0
- Home: 3–3–0
- Road: 1–6–0

Coaches and captains
- Head coach: Joseph Petroski
- Captain: Bill Forbes

The 1947–48 New Hampshire Wildcats men's ice hockey season was the 21st season of play for the program but first under the oversight of the NCAA. The Wildcats represented the University of New Hampshire and were coached by Joseph Petroski, in his 1st season.

== Season ==
With new coach Pat Petroski in charge, the weather generously turned cold in December, allowing the team plenty of time to practice before their first game. Unfortunately, they were easily bested in their first game. Upon returning home, the hard work began to show when they lost a close decision to Northeastern and then followed that up with their first win of the year. The UNH defense, led by Tom Kelly, didn't acquit itself well in a pair of losses to fairly weak competition but by the end of the month they had coalesced into a serviceable group. Following a good showing against Boston University, the Wildcats got their revenge over the Huskies with an 8–5 win. After a second loss to BU, UNH knocked off Norwich to put themselves into contention for the inaugural NEIHL tournament. While their chances weren't good, any hope they had was erased when MIT won the rematch game and UNH sputtered to the finish.

The weather, which had been good throughout January, turned on February 10 and the Wildcats found it difficult to practice thereafter.

== Roster ==
No.	Nat.	Player	Class	Pos	Height	Weight	DoB	Hometown	Previous team
		David Austin	Sophomore	D				Manchester, New Hampshire
		Donald R. Begin					1920-09-12	Salem, Massachusetts
		Paul L. Briand Jr.	Senior	F				Cambridge, Massachusetts
		Frederick H. Comings	Sophomore				1921-09-01	Foxborough, Massachusetts
		John Fields
		William Forbes (C)	Senior	F				Francestown, New Hampshire
		Neil Glynn	Junior					Franklin, Massachusetts
		Bruce Grant	Junior					Durham, New Hampshire
		Robert Keith	Junior	G				Waltham, Massachusetts
		Thomas Kelly		D
		William MacDonald	Junior	F				Hanover, New Hampshire
		William J. Moore Jr.	Junior	G				Manchester, New Hampshire
		Edward J. Noel	Junior	F			1918-08-20	Nashua, New Hampshire
		Augustus Nunes	Senior
		Robert B. Ray	Sophomore					Anson, Maine
		Arthur F. Saboski	Junior					Hanover, New Hampshire
		George C. Saunders	Junior	F				Plaistow, New Hampshire
		Dale Schoonmaker		F
		George R. Sleeth	Sophomore	F			1923-01-05	Wollaston, Massachusetts

== Standings ==
1947–48 NCAA Independent ice hockey standings
	Intercollegiate							Overall					
	GP	W	L	T	Pct.	GF	GA	GP	W	L	T	GF	GA
Army	16	11	4	1	.719	78	39	16	11	4	1	78	39
Bemidji State	5	0	5	0	.000	13	36	10	2	8	0	37	63
Boston College	19	14	5	0	.737	126	60	19	14	5	0	126	60
Boston University	24	20	4	0	.833	179	86	24	20	4	0	179	86
Bowdoin	9	4	5	0	.444	45	68	11	6	5	0	56	73
Brown	14	5	9	0	.357	61	91	14	5	9	0	61	91
California	10	2	8	0	.200	45	67	18	6	12	0	94	106
Clarkson	12	5	6	1	.458	67	39	17	10	6	1	96	54
Colby	8	2	6	0	.250	28	41	8	2	6	0	28	41
Colgate	10	7	3	0	.700	54	34	13	10	3	0	83	45
Colorado College	14	9	5	0	.643	84	73	27	19	8	0	207	120
Cornell	4	0	4	0	.000	3	43	4	0	4	0	3	43
Dartmouth	23	21	2	0	.913	156	76	24	21	3	0	156	81
Fort Devens State	13	3	10	0	.231	33	74	–	–	–	–	–	–
Georgetown	3	2	1	0	.667	12	11	7	5	2	0	37	21
Hamilton	–	–	–	–	–	–	–	14	7	7	0	–	–
Harvard	22	9	13	0	.409	131	131	23	9	14	0	135	140
Lehigh	9	0	9	0	.000	10	100	11	0	11	0	14	113
Massachusetts	2	0	2	0	.000	1	23	3	0	3	0	3	30
Michigan	18	16	2	0	.889	105	53	23	20	2	1	141	63
Michigan Tech	19	7	12	0	.368	87	96	20	8	12	0	91	97
Middlebury	14	8	5	1	.607	111	68	16	10	5	1	127	74
Minnesota	16	9	7	0	.563	78	73	21	9	12	0	100	105
Minnesota–Duluth	6	3	3	0	.500	21	24	9	6	3	0	36	28
MIT	19	8	11	0	.421	93	114	19	8	11	0	93	114
New Hampshire	13	4	9	0	.308	58	67	13	4	9	0	58	67
North Dakota	10	6	4	0	.600	51	46	16	11	5	0	103	68
North Dakota Agricultural	8	5	3	0	.571	43	33	8	5	3	0	43	33
Northeastern	19	10	9	0	.526	135	119	19	10	9	0	135	119
Norwich	9	3	6	0	.333	38	58	13	6	7	0	56	70
Princeton	18	8	10	0	.444	65	72	21	10	11	0	79	79
St. Cloud State	12	10	2	0	.833	55	35	16	12	4	0	73	55
St. Lawrence	9	6	3	0	.667	65	27	13	8	4	1	95	50
Suffolk	–	–	–	–	–	–	–	–	–	–	–	–	–
Tufts	4	3	1	0	.750	17	15	4	3	1	0	17	15
Union	9	1	8	0	.111	7	86	9	1	8	0	7	86
Williams	11	3	6	2	.364	37	47	13	4	7	2	–	–
Yale	16	5	10	1	.344	60	69	20	8	11	1	89	85

1947–48 New England Intercollegiate Hockey League standings
	Conference							Overall					
	GP	W	L	T	PTS	GF	GA	GP	W	L	T	GF	GA
Boston University †	13	12	1	0	.923	86	40	24	20	4	0	179	86
Boston College *	10	9	1	0	.900	77	29	19	14	5	0	126	60
Northeastern	14	8	6	0	.571	108	79	19	10	9	0	135	119
Bowdoin	6	3	3	0	.500	32	38	11	6	5	0	56	73
MIT	14	5	9	0	.357	62	87	19	8	11	0	93	114
Middlebury	6	2	4	0	.333	27	48	16	10	5	1	127	74
New Hampshire	10	3	7	0	.300	42	56	13	4	9	0	58	67
Norwich	7	2	5	0	.286	25	50	13	6	7	0	56	70
Fort Devens State	11	3	8	0	.273	30	55	–	–	–	–	–	–
Colby	5	1	4	0	.200	17	27	8	2	6	0	28	41
† indicates conference champion * indicates conference tournament champion

== Schedule and results ==
Date	Opponent	Site	Result	Record
Regular Season
January 7	at Army*	Smith Rink • West Point, New York	L 2–7	0–1–0
January 10	Northeastern	UNH Ice Rink • Durham, New Hampshire	L 4–5	0–2–0 (0–1–0)
January 12	Colby	UNH Ice Rink • Durham, New Hampshire	W 6–4	1–2–0 (1–1–0)
January 14	at Bowdoin	Delta Rink • Brunswick, Maine	L 5–6	1–3–0 (1–2–0)
January 17	MIT	UNH Ice Rink • Durham, New Hampshire	L 2–8	1–4–0 (1–3–0)
January 20	Massachusetts*	UNH Ice Rink • Durham, New Hampshire	W 12–0	2–4–0
January 24	Boston University	UNH Ice Rink • Durham, New Hampshire	L 4–6	2–5–0 (1–4–0)
January 26	at Northeastern	Boston Arena • Boston, Massachusetts	W 8–5	3–5–0 (2–4–0)
January 27	at Boston University	Boston Arena • Boston, Massachusetts	L 1–4	3–6–0 (2–5–0)
January 28	Norwich	UNH Ice Rink • Durham, New Hampshire	W 7–5	4–6–0 (3–5–0)
February 10	at MIT	Boston Arena • Boston, Massachusetts	L 3–4	4–7–0 (3–6–0)
February 16	at Boston College	Boston Arena • Boston, Massachusetts	L 2–9	4–8–0 (3–7–0)
February 18	at Brown*	Rhode Island Auditorium • Providence, Rhode Island	L 2–4	4–9–0
*Non-conference game.

== Scoring statistics ==
Name	Position	Games	Goals	Assists	Points	PIM
David Austin	D	-	-	-	-	-
Paul Briand	RW	-	-	-	-	-
Bill Forbes	C	-	20	8	28	-
Bob Keith		-	-	-	-	-
Tom Kelly	D	-	-	-	-	-
Bill MacDonald	LW	-	-	11	-	-
Bill Moore	G	-	-	-	-	-
Woody Noel	F	-	-	-	-	-
George Saunders	F	-	-	-	-	-
George Sleeth	F	-	-	-	-	-
Total						

Note: Only sparse goaltending statistics are available.
