= 1947–48 Boston University Terriers men's ice hockey season =

NEIHL, Champion
- Conference: 1st NEIHL
- Home ice: Boston Arena

Record
- Overall: 20–4–0
- Conference: 12–1–0
- Home: 7–1–0
- Road: 6–1–0
- Neutral: 7–2–0

Coaches and captains
- Head coach: Harry Cleverly
- Captain: Benjamin Forbes

The 1947–48 Boston University Terriers men's ice hockey season was the 26th season of play for the program but first under the oversight of the NCAA. The Terriers represent Boston University and were coached by Harry Cleverly, in his 3rd season.

== Season ==
With the advent of a national tournament for this season, Boston University was one of the eastern teams favored to receive one of the two available bids. The Terriers didn't disappoint early when their offense, led by the top line of Dana Hixon, Irving Haynes and Jack Clopeck, showed up in force. BU scored in bunches and dominated their first four opponents. Their fifth game would be their biggest test, however, as Dartmouth was another prospective tournament hopeful, having won the last four eastern intercollegiate titles. Both teams were the measure of the other in the match and the two heavyweights fought to a draw in regulation. Unfortunately for the Terriers, Dartmouth pulled out the victory in overtime.

BU responded to their first loss of the season by going on a tear through eastern teams, winning their next four games by wide margins. After a week off the Terriers slowed down a bit but continued to pile up the victories and ran their record to 11–1. The team was hoping to break even with Dartmouth in the rematch, however, the second edition looked eerily similar to the first as the Indians took the match 5–6 in regulation. With the two losses to the greens and Dartmouth being the best team in the east, Boston University would need to win its conference championship if it had any hope of making the tournament.

To that point, the Terriers had been undefeated in league play and that trend continued as BU went on a third winning streak. Their final game of the regular season came against rival Boston College and was a rematch of an earlier BU victory. While the game would not affect BU's position in the standings, as they had already guaranteed themselves the NEIHL title, It could still impact the selection committee's decision on who would be the second eastern team. The Eagles, who were now playing with a full complement of players, stunned BU with a 2–9 drubbing and evened the season series. Fortunately, the Terriers had a chance to improve their standing because the NEIHL had instituted a conference tournament this season. BU was set against 3rd-place team Northeastern and were expecting the beat the Huskies for the third time that season, however, BU's defense faltered for the second straight game and the Terriers fell 5–8. The loss all but guaranteed that BU would not be selected for the tournament and the Terriers took their frustration out on Bowdoin in the consolation game, hammering the Polar Bears 18–4 and setting a new program record (since broken) for the most goals scored in one game.

== Roster ==
No.	Nat.	Player	Class	Pos	Height	Weight	DoB	Hometown	Previous team
1		Ralph E. Bevins	Sophomore	G			1924-10-07
2		James Smith	Senior	D
5		Jerome Gleason	Junior	D
6		William Kirrane	Junior	F				Brookline, Massachusetts
8		Irving Haynes	Sophomore	F				Waltham, Massachusetts
9		Larry Dutton		D
10		Benjamin Forbes (C)	Senior	F
11		William Jurgelevich	Sophomore	D
12		Don Cleary	Junior	F				Cambridge, Massachusetts
14		Donald M. Dockrell		F			1925-10-20	Weathersfield, Connecticut
15		Lloyd Robinson		F				Wellesley, Massachusetts
16		Jack Clopeck		F			1925-05-15	Schenectady, New York
17		Bob Bell	Sophomore	F				Framingham, Massachusetts
18		Dana Hixon	Sophomore	F				Framingham, Massachusetts
20		Walt Anderson	Sophomore	D				Waltham, Massachusetts
		Bill Gibson		F
		Dick Grant		F
		John D. Pynchon	Sophomore	D			1927-06-24	Boston, Massachusetts

== Standings ==
1947–48 NCAA Independent ice hockey standings
	Intercollegiate							Overall					
	GP	W	L	T	Pct.	GF	GA	GP	W	L	T	GF	GA
Army	16	11	4	1	.719	78	39	16	11	4	1	78	39
Bemidji State	5	0	5	0	.000	13	36	10	2	8	0	37	63
Boston College	19	14	5	0	.737	126	60	19	14	5	0	126	60
Boston University	24	20	4	0	.833	179	86	24	20	4	0	179	86
Bowdoin	9	4	5	0	.444	45	68	11	6	5	0	56	73
Brown	14	5	9	0	.357	61	91	14	5	9	0	61	91
California	10	2	8	0	.200	45	67	18	6	12	0	94	106
Clarkson	12	5	6	1	.458	67	39	17	10	6	1	96	54
Colby	8	2	6	0	.250	28	41	8	2	6	0	28	41
Colgate	10	7	3	0	.700	54	34	13	10	3	0	83	45
Colorado College	14	9	5	0	.643	84	73	27	19	8	0	207	120
Cornell	4	0	4	0	.000	3	43	4	0	4	0	3	43
Dartmouth	23	21	2	0	.913	156	76	24	21	3	0	156	81
Fort Devens State	13	3	10	0	.231	33	74	–	–	–	–	–	–
Georgetown	3	2	1	0	.667	12	11	7	5	2	0	37	21
Hamilton	–	–	–	–	–	–	–	14	7	7	0	–	–
Harvard	22	9	13	0	.409	131	131	23	9	14	0	135	140
Lehigh	9	0	9	0	.000	10	100	11	0	11	0	14	113
Massachusetts	2	0	2	0	.000	1	23	3	0	3	0	3	30
Michigan	18	16	2	0	.889	105	53	23	20	2	1	141	63
Michigan Tech	19	7	12	0	.368	87	96	20	8	12	0	91	97
Middlebury	14	8	5	1	.607	111	68	16	10	5	1	127	74
Minnesota	16	9	7	0	.563	78	73	21	9	12	0	100	105
Minnesota–Duluth	6	3	3	0	.500	21	24	9	6	3	0	36	28
MIT	19	8	11	0	.421	93	114	19	8	11	0	93	114
New Hampshire	13	4	9	0	.308	58	67	13	4	9	0	58	67
North Dakota	10	6	4	0	.600	51	46	16	11	5	0	103	68
North Dakota Agricultural	8	5	3	0	.571	43	33	8	5	3	0	43	33
Northeastern	19	10	9	0	.526	135	119	19	10	9	0	135	119
Norwich	9	3	6	0	.333	38	58	13	6	7	0	56	70
Princeton	18	8	10	0	.444	65	72	21	10	11	0	79	79
St. Cloud State	12	10	2	0	.833	55	35	16	12	4	0	73	55
St. Lawrence	9	6	3	0	.667	65	27	13	8	4	1	95	50
Suffolk	–	–	–	–	–	–	–	–	–	–	–	–	–
Tufts	4	3	1	0	.750	17	15	4	3	1	0	17	15
Union	9	1	8	0	.111	7	86	9	1	8	0	7	86
Williams	11	3	6	2	.364	37	47	13	4	7	2	–	–
Yale	16	5	10	1	.344	60	69	20	8	11	1	89	85

1947–48 New England Intercollegiate Hockey League standings
	Conference							Overall					
	GP	W	L	T	PTS	GF	GA	GP	W	L	T	GF	GA
Boston University †	13	12	1	0	.923	86	40	24	20	4	0	179	86
Boston College *	10	9	1	0	.900	77	29	19	14	5	0	126	60
Northeastern	14	8	6	0	.571	108	79	19	10	9	0	135	119
Bowdoin	6	3	3	0	.500	32	38	11	6	5	0	56	73
MIT	14	5	9	0	.357	62	87	19	8	11	0	93	114
Middlebury	6	2	4	0	.333	27	48	16	10	5	1	127	74
New Hampshire	10	3	7	0	.300	42	56	13	4	9	0	58	67
Norwich	7	2	5	0	.286	25	50	13	6	7	0	56	70
Fort Devens State	11	3	8	0	.273	30	55	–	–	–	–	–	–
Colby	5	1	4	0	.200	17	27	8	2	6	0	28	41
† indicates conference champion * indicates conference tournament champion

== Schedule and results ==
Date	Opponent	Site	Result	Record
Regular Season
December 6	vs. MIT	Boston Arena • Boston, Massachusetts	W 10–5	1–0–0 (1–0–0)
December 8	Fort Devens State	Boston Arena • Boston, Massachusetts	W 10–1	2–0–0 (2–0–0)
December 10	vs. Harvard*	Boston Arena • Boston, Massachusetts	W 8–2	3–0–0
December 16	vs. MIT	Boston Arena • Boston, Massachusetts	W 7–0	4–0–0 (3–0–0)
December 18	at Dartmouth*	Davis Rink • Hanover, New Hampshire	L 5–6 ^{OT}	4–1–0
December 22	vs. Northeastern	Boston Arena • Boston, Massachusetts	W 7–5	5–1–0 (4–0–0)
January 5	Holy Cross*	Boston Arena • Boston, Massachusetts	W 13–5	6–1–0
January 7	at Colby	South End Arena • Waterville, Maine	W 5–0	7–1–0 (5–0–0)
January 8	at Brown*	Rhode Island Auditorium • Providence, Rhode Island	W 13–2	8–1–0
January 17	at Yale*	New Haven Arena • New Haven, Connecticut	W 4–3	9–1–0
January 20	Fort Devens State	Boston Arena • Boston, Massachusetts	W 6–3	10–1–0 (6–0–0)
January 24	at New Hampshire	UNH Ice Rink • Durham, New Hampshire	W 6–4	11–1–0 (7–0–0)
January 26	Dartmouth*	Boston Arena • Boston, Massachusetts	L 5–6	11–2–0
January 27	New Hampshire	Boston Arena • Boston, Massachusetts	W 4–1	12–2–0 (8–0–0)
January 30	at Army*	Smith Rink • West Point, New York	W 4–3	13–2–0
January 31	at Princeton*	Hobey Baker Memorial Rink • Princeton, New Jersey	W 8–1	14–2–0
February 2	vs. Northeastern	Boston Arena • Boston, Massachusetts	W 12–2	15–2–0 (9–0–0)
February 3	vs. Boston College	Boston Arena • Boston, Massachusetts	W 5–3	16–2–0 (10–0–0)
February 10	Norwich	Boston Arena • Boston, Massachusetts	W 7–3	17–2–0 (11–0–0)
February 11	vs. Harvard*	Boston Arena • Boston, Massachusetts	W 10–6	18–2–0
March 2	Middlebury	Boston Arena • Boston, Massachusetts	W 5–4 ^{OT}	19–2–0 (12–0–0)
March 3	vs. Boston College	Boston Arena • Boston, Massachusetts	L 2–9	19–3–0 (12–1–0)
NEIHL Tournament
March 8	vs. Northeastern*	Boston Arena • Boston, Massachusetts (NEIHL Semifinal)	L 5–8	19–4–0
March 9	Bowdoin*	Boston Arena • Boston, Massachusetts (NEIHL Consolation)	W 18–4	20–4–0
*Non-conference game.

== Scoring statistics ==
Name	Position	Games	Goals	Assists	Points	PIM
Dana Hixon		-	33	16	49	-
Don Cleary		-	21	16	37	-
Bill Gibson		24	13	18	31	-
Benjamin Forbes		-	17	13	30	-
William Kirrane		-	8	13	21	-
Donald Cockrell		19	2	3	5	-
John Pynchon		8	0	0	0	-
Irving Haynes		-	-	23	-	-
Walt Anderson		-	-	-	-	-
Bob Bell		-	-	-	-	-
Jack Clopeck		-	-	-	-	-
Larry Dutton		-	-	-	-	-
Jerome Gleason		-	-	-	-	-
William Jurgelevich		-	-	-	-	-
Lloyd Robinson		-	-	-	-	-
James Smith		-	-	-	-	-
Ralph Bevins	G	24	-	-	-	-
Total			123	130	253	-
