= 1947–48 Brown Bears men's ice hockey season =

- Conference: Independent

Record
- Overall: 5–9–0
- Home: 2–4–0
- Road: 2–5–0
- Neutral: 1–0–0

Coaches and captains
- Head coach: Westcott Moulton
- Captain: none

The 1947–48 Brown Bears men's ice hockey season was the 23rd season of play for the program but first under the oversight of the NCAA. The Bears represented Brown University and were coached by Westcott Moulton, in his 1st season.

== Season ==
After a 9-year absence, Brown returned to the ice with Westcott Moulton (class of 1931) now helming the program. The Bears were predictably having to contend with a lack of experienced players but, with the Rhode Island Auditorium still at their disposal, Brown could still get practice time regardless of the weather conditions. The first game for the Bruins came against Harvard who, though no longer the preeminent power, were still a tough team to beat. The Bears showed up well and kept the contest close, ending regulation with a 5–5 tie. The 10-minute overtime, however, demonstrated just how far the Brunos still had to go. Harvard was able to score 5 additional goals in the extra session which were mostly attributed to Brown's lack of depth. The team performed nearly as well in their second game when they rallied from a 2–5 deficit in the third to end just 1 goal shy of a tie. The same trend continued in Brown's third game when the Bears kept the game close only to see Princeton pull away late.

Brown didn't play against until after returning from the winter break. In the interim, Moulton was able to put together a third line with new addition Rod Scheffer teaming with Henry Healy and Charlie Bryant while Warren Howard took over as the starter in goal. Unfortunately, they were met at home by one of the top teams in the nation. Boston University had little sympathy for the returning Bears and throttled Brown 2–13. Near the end of the game the Bruins, unable to match the offensive punch of the Terriers, fought back in the only way they could when Ned Dewey got into a fight with Don Cleary. While it had no impact on the outcome of the game, the scuffle buoyed the team for their match with Colby. The inspired Bears tore through the Mules and posted their first win on the season in dominating fashion.

There was renewed hope after the victory and Brown was looking for revenge against Harvard. Unfortunately, just like the BU game, very little went right for the Bears. The Crimson squad eviscerated Brown to the tune of 3–17, posting the most goals scored against the Brunos in program history (still a record as of 2022). The only consolation in the game was that star center Fred Nelson was able to keep his scoring streak alive.

Unbowed by the severe defeat, Brown played well in the next game against Fort Devens State. While the score was close, it was only through the efforts of Chiefs' netminder Hal Downes. Brown was obviously the better team throughout the game and were able to post their second win of the season. After an unfortunate but predictable loss to the best team in the country, Dartmouth, Brown headed to West Point for their final game before the semester break. Leading up to the game the Bears were unable to practice due to the Ice Capades being at the Auditorium. That and the fact that it was the third road game that week made the Bears sluggish and unable to counter a fairly strong Cadet team. Brown entered the examination period with a disappointing 2–6 mark but had played far better than their record indicated.

The Bruins went down the home stretch of their season with three games in four days after the break. Joining the team were newcomers George Menard, Dan Rawson and Jim Ferry. After a strong win over MIT, the Bruins stunned Yale with an 8–7 win. The winning streak was ended by Cal goaltender Ian Watson who stymied the Bears for much of the match. Menard proved himself to be a great addition to the team when he played the entire game against New Hampshire and scored the Bears' final two goals in the match. The Bears ended the season with a narrow defeat to MIT, however, despite the poor record the year was seen as a success; Brown had won several games and even in some of their losses they did not look out of place with some of the college hockey regulars.

== Roster ==
No.	Nat.	Player	Class	Pos	Height	Weight	DoB	Hometown	Previous team
		George E. Ball	Junior	F				Hamden, Connecticut
		Charles W. Bryant	Senior	D				Providence, Rhode Island
		Lawrence G. Copeland	Sophomore	F			1928-06-06	New Haven, Connecticut
		Charles R. D'Ewart	Junior	D				Worcester, Massachusetts
		Robert H. Davidson	Junior	F				Dedham, Massachusetts
		Charles D. De Laittre	Sophomore	G			1928-10-03	Minneapolis, Minnesota
		Edward Dewey Jr.	Sophomore	D			1927-12-26	Hartford, Connecticut
		James Ferry	Sophomore	F
		Henry M. Healy	Sophomore	F
		Warren R. Howard	Sophomore	G			1926-03-19	Johnston, Rhode Island
		John F. Kimball Jr.	Sophomore				1928-03-16	New York, New York
		George F. Menard	Sophomore	D			1927-09-03	Burrillville, Rhode Island
		Frederick Nelson	Junior	F
		Joseph W. Pridmore III	Junior	D				Lynnfield Center, Massachusetts
		Donald R. Rawson	Sophomore	F			1927-10-14	Burrillville, Rhode Island
		Robert J. Rinfret	Freshman	D			1925-12-12
		Rodman C. Scheffer	Sophomore	F			1928-04-01	New York, New York
		Robert P. Shaughnessy	Junior					Brooklyn, New York
		Lawrence Shepard	Junior	F
		William F. Smith	Sophomore	F			1924-04-21	New Haven, Connecticut
		Frank A. Sternberg	Sophomore				1927-03-04	Springfield, Massachusetts
		Edward A. Vincent	Junior	F			1919-05-07	Slatersville, Rhode Island
		Walter F. Walworth Jr.	Senior	F				Arlington, Massachusetts

Note: John Kimball, Robert Shaughnessy and Frank Sternberg are listed as being members of the team but do not appear to have played in any of the games.

== Standings ==
1947–48 NCAA Independent ice hockey standings
	Intercollegiate							Overall					
	GP	W	L	T	Pct.	GF	GA	GP	W	L	T	GF	GA
Army	16	11	4	1	.719	78	39	16	11	4	1	78	39
Bemidji State	5	0	5	0	.000	13	36	10	2	8	0	37	63
Boston College	19	14	5	0	.737	126	60	19	14	5	0	126	60
Boston University	24	20	4	0	.833	179	86	24	20	4	0	179	86
Bowdoin	9	4	5	0	.444	45	68	11	6	5	0	56	73
Brown	14	5	9	0	.357	61	91	14	5	9	0	61	91
California	10	2	8	0	.200	45	67	18	6	12	0	94	106
Clarkson	12	5	6	1	.458	67	39	17	10	6	1	96	54
Colby	8	2	6	0	.250	28	41	8	2	6	0	28	41
Colgate	10	7	3	0	.700	54	34	13	10	3	0	83	45
Colorado College	14	9	5	0	.643	84	73	27	19	8	0	207	120
Cornell	4	0	4	0	.000	3	43	4	0	4	0	3	43
Dartmouth	23	21	2	0	.913	156	76	24	21	3	0	156	81
Fort Devens State	13	3	10	0	.231	33	74	–	–	–	–	–	–
Georgetown	3	2	1	0	.667	12	11	7	5	2	0	37	21
Hamilton	–	–	–	–	–	–	–	14	7	7	0	–	–
Harvard	22	9	13	0	.409	131	131	23	9	14	0	135	140
Lehigh	9	0	9	0	.000	10	100	11	0	11	0	14	113
Massachusetts	2	0	2	0	.000	1	23	3	0	3	0	3	30
Michigan	18	16	2	0	.889	105	53	23	20	2	1	141	63
Michigan Tech	19	7	12	0	.368	87	96	20	8	12	0	91	97
Middlebury	14	8	5	1	.607	111	68	16	10	5	1	127	74
Minnesota	16	9	7	0	.563	78	73	21	9	12	0	100	105
Minnesota–Duluth	6	3	3	0	.500	21	24	9	6	3	0	36	28
MIT	19	8	11	0	.421	93	114	19	8	11	0	93	114
New Hampshire	13	4	9	0	.308	58	67	13	4	9	0	58	67
North Dakota	10	6	4	0	.600	51	46	16	11	5	0	103	68
North Dakota Agricultural	8	5	3	0	.571	43	33	8	5	3	0	43	33
Northeastern	19	10	9	0	.526	135	119	19	10	9	0	135	119
Norwich	9	3	6	0	.333	38	58	13	6	7	0	56	70
Princeton	18	8	10	0	.444	65	72	21	10	11	0	79	79
St. Cloud State	12	10	2	0	.833	55	35	16	12	4	0	73	55
St. Lawrence	9	6	3	0	.667	65	27	13	8	4	1	95	50
Suffolk	–	–	–	–	–	–	–	–	–	–	–	–	–
Tufts	4	3	1	0	.750	17	15	4	3	1	0	17	15
Union	9	1	8	0	.111	7	86	9	1	8	0	7	86
Williams	11	3	6	2	.364	37	47	13	4	7	2	–	–
Yale	16	5	10	1	.344	60	69	20	8	11	1	89	85

== Schedule and results ==
Date	Opponent	Site	Result	Record
Regular Season
December 4	Harvard*	Rhode Island Auditorium • Providence, Rhode Island	L 5–10 ^{OT}	0–1–0
December 10	at Yale*	New Haven Arena • New Haven, Connecticut	L 4–5	0–2–0
December 13	at Princeton*	Hobey Baker Memorial Rink • Princeton, New Jersey	L 4–7	0–3–0
January 8	Boston University*	Rhode Island Auditorium • Providence, Rhode Island	L 2–13	0–4–0
January 10	at Colby*	South End Arena • Waterville, Maine	W 7–0	1–4–0
January 14	at Harvard*	Boston Arena • Boston, Massachusetts	L 3–17	1–5–0
January 19	vs. Fort Devens State*	Boston Arena • Boston, Massachusetts	W 2–1	2–5–0
January 21	at Dartmouth*	Davis Rink • Hanover, New Hampshire	L 1–7	2–6–0
January 24	at Army*	Smith Rink • West Point, New York	L 2–3	2–7–0
February 11	at MIT*	Boston Arena • Boston, Massachusetts	W 9–2	3–7–0
February 12	Yale*	Rhode Island Auditorium • Providence, Rhode Island	W 8–7	4–7–0
February 14	California*	Rhode Island Auditorium • Providence, Rhode Island	L 4–10	4–8–0
February 18	New Hampshire*	Rhode Island Auditorium • Providence, Rhode Island	W 4–2	5–8–0
February 25	MIT*	Rhode Island Auditorium • Providence, Rhode Island	L 6–7	5–9–0
*Non-conference game.

== Scoring statistics ==
Name	Position	Games	Goals	Assists	Points	PIM
George Ball	C	-	-	-	-	-
Charlie Bryant	LW/D	-	-	-	-	-
Larry Copeland	RW	-	-	10	-	-
Chuck D'Ewart	D	-	-	-	-	-
Bobby Davidson	LW	-	-	-	-	-
Chuck De Laittre	G	-	-	-	-	-
Ned Dewey	D	-	-	-	-	-
Jim Ferry	F	-	-	-	-	-
Harry Healy	RW	-	-	-	-	-
Warren Howard	G	-	-	-	-	-
George Menard	D	-	-	-	-	-
Fred Nelson	C	-	11	10	21	-
Joe Pridmore	D	-	-	-	-	-
Don Rawson	F	-	-	-	-	-
Bob Rinfret	D	-	-	-	-	-
Rod Scheffer	C	-	-	-	-	-
Larry Shepard	RW	-	-	-	-	-
William Smith		-	-	-	-	-
Eddie Vincent	LW	-	-	-	-	-
Wally Walworth	RW	-	-	-	-	-
Total						
