= 1947–48 Bemidji State Beavers men's ice hockey season =

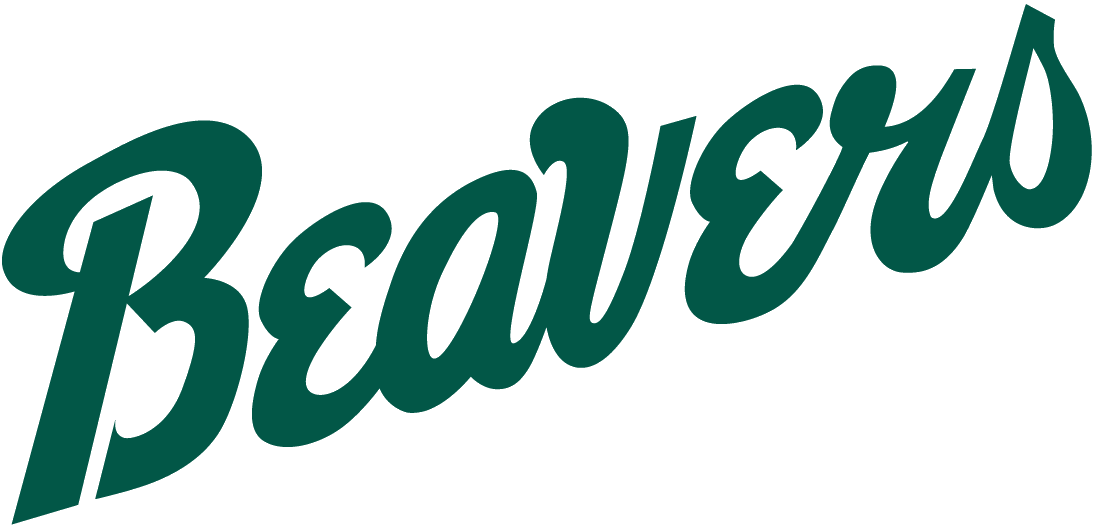
- Conference: Independent
- Home ice: Bemidji Sports Arena

Record
- Overall: 2–8–0

Coaches and captains
- Head coach: Jack Aldrich
- Captain: Ed Johnson

The 1947–48 Bemidji State Beavers men's ice hockey season was the inaugural season of play for the program. The Beavers represented Bemidji State Teachers College and were coached by Jack Aldrich, in his 1st season.

== Season ==
After fielding a club team the year before, Bemidji State brought in Jack Aldrich to coach the program first official season. Predictably, the team was a little out of sorts in their first few games and the Beavers were trampled in three straight contests. By the end on January, however, the club began to come together. While they ended up losing their fourth game in a row, the lost by just a single goal and then followed that up with a win the very next night. BSU dropped the next four games as well but the team was much more competitive. The Beavers ended the year on a high note, trouncing the Brunswick Aces 9–4.

== Roster ==
No.	Nat.	Player	Class	Pos	Height	Weight	DoB	Hometown	Previous team
		Ronald Aase	Freshman	W			1930-01-06	Thief River Falls, Minnesota	Lincoln H.S. (USHS-MN)
		Richard Anderson		RW				Eagan, Minnesota
		Orrin Barnum	Sophomore	F			1926-04-17	Glencoe, Minnesota	Glencoe H.S. (USHS-MN)
		Ledyard "Ledge" Burhans		C			1920-09-30	Crookston, Minnesota	Northwest School of Agriculture
		John Emkovik	Junior	D			1927-06-06	Saint Paul, Minnesota	Johnson H.S. (USHS-MN)
		Clarence Espeseth		LW			1920-01-30	Roseau, Minnesota	Roseau H.S. (USHS-MN)
		Ed Johnson (C)		D			1926-02-10	International Falls, Minnesota
		Dale Kverno		D			1928-08-07	Roseau, Minnesota	Roseau H.S. (USHS-MN)
		Harry Lillesve		F			1924-06-12	McIntosh, Minnesota	McIntosh H.S. (USHS-MN)
		Gordon Olson		G
		Dick Radniecki		F			1927-04-18	Trail, Minnesota	Northwest School of Agriculture
		Wilbert "Willie" Remus		W			1927-01-22	Saint Paul, Minnesota	Johnson H.S. (USHS-MN)
		Sims		W
		Dick Walters		RW
		John Whiting		W			1929-01-24	Hibbing, Minnesota	Hibbing H.S. (USHS-MN)

== Standings ==
1947–48 NCAA Independent ice hockey standings
	Intercollegiate							Overall					
	GP	W	L	T	Pct.	GF	GA	GP	W	L	T	GF	GA
Army	16	11	4	1	.719	78	39	16	11	4	1	78	39
Bemidji State	5	0	5	0	.000	13	36	10	2	8	0	37	63
Boston College	19	14	5	0	.737	126	60	19	14	5	0	126	60
Boston University	24	20	4	0	.833	179	86	24	20	4	0	179	86
Bowdoin	9	4	5	0	.444	45	68	11	6	5	0	56	73
Brown	14	5	9	0	.357	61	91	14	5	9	0	61	91
California	10	2	8	0	.200	45	67	18	6	12	0	94	106
Clarkson	12	5	6	1	.458	67	39	17	10	6	1	96	54
Colby	8	2	6	0	.250	28	41	8	2	6	0	28	41
Colgate	10	7	3	0	.700	54	34	13	10	3	0	83	45
Colorado College	14	9	5	0	.643	84	73	27	19	8	0	207	120
Cornell	4	0	4	0	.000	3	43	4	0	4	0	3	43
Dartmouth	23	21	2	0	.913	156	76	24	21	3	0	156	81
Fort Devens State	13	3	10	0	.231	33	74	–	–	–	–	–	–
Georgetown	3	2	1	0	.667	12	11	7	5	2	0	37	21
Hamilton	–	–	–	–	–	–	–	14	7	7	0	–	–
Harvard	22	9	13	0	.409	131	131	23	9	14	0	135	140
Lehigh	9	0	9	0	.000	10	100	11	0	11	0	14	113
Massachusetts	2	0	2	0	.000	1	23	3	0	3	0	3	30
Michigan	18	16	2	0	.889	105	53	23	20	2	1	141	63
Michigan Tech	19	7	12	0	.368	87	96	20	8	12	0	91	97
Middlebury	14	8	5	1	.607	111	68	16	10	5	1	127	74
Minnesota	16	9	7	0	.563	78	73	21	9	12	0	100	105
Minnesota–Duluth	6	3	3	0	.500	21	24	9	6	3	0	36	28
MIT	19	8	11	0	.421	93	114	19	8	11	0	93	114
New Hampshire	13	4	9	0	.308	58	67	13	4	9	0	58	67
North Dakota	10	6	4	0	.600	51	46	16	11	5	0	103	68
North Dakota Agricultural	8	5	3	0	.571	43	33	8	5	3	0	43	33
Northeastern	19	10	9	0	.526	135	119	19	10	9	0	135	119
Norwich	9	3	6	0	.333	38	58	13	6	7	0	56	70
Princeton	18	8	10	0	.444	65	72	21	10	11	0	79	79
St. Cloud State	12	10	2	0	.833	55	35	16	12	4	0	73	55
St. Lawrence	9	6	3	0	.667	65	27	13	8	4	1	95	50
Suffolk	–	–	–	–	–	–	–	–	–	–	–	–	–
Tufts	4	3	1	0	.750	17	15	4	3	1	0	17	15
Union	9	1	8	0	.111	7	86	9	1	8	0	7	86
Williams	11	3	6	2	.364	37	47	13	4	7	2	–	–
Yale	16	5	10	1	.344	60	69	20	8	11	1	89	85

== Schedule and results ==
Date	Opponent	Site	Result	Record
Regular Season
January 18	St. Cloud State*	Bemidji Sports Arena • Bemidji, Minnesota	L 2–12	0–1–0
January 25	North Dakota Agricultural*	Bemidji Sports Arena • Bemidji, Minnesota	L 3–9	0–2–0
January 28	at Grand Forks Legion*	Grand Forks, North Dakota	L 1–8	0–3–0
January 31	North Dakota Agricultural*	Bemidji Sports Arena • Bemidji, Minnesota	L 1–2	0–4–0
February 1	International Falls*	Bemidji Sports Arena • Bemidji, Minnesota	W 6–2	1–4–0
February 7	at International Falls*	International Falls, Minnesota	L 3–5	1–5–0
February 8	at Minnesota–Duluth*	Duluth Curling and Skating Club • Duluth, Minnesota	L 3–4	1–6–0
February 12	at Grand Forks Americans*	Grand Forks, North Dakota	L 5–8	1–7–0
February 15	Minnesota–Duluth*	Bemidji Sports Arena • Bemidji, Minnesota	L 4–9	1–8–0
February 29	Brunswick Aces*	Bemidji Sports Arena • Bemidji, Minnesota	W 9–4	2–8–0
*Non-conference game.

== Statistics ==
Only incomplete records for the first season are available. The school reported no assist totals and credits John Whiting as leading the team with 3 official goals.
