= 1947–48 St. Cloud State Huskies men's ice hockey season =

Minnesota State Tournament, Champion
- Conference: Independent
- Home ice: J. C. Brown Athletic Field

Record
- Overall: 12–4–0

Coaches and captains
- Head coach: Roland Vandell
- Captain: Sergio Gambucci

The 1947–48 St. Cloud State Huskies men's ice hockey season was the 14th season of play for the program but 1st under NCAA oversight. The Huskies represented St. Cloud State Teachers College and were coached by Roland Vandell in his 2nd season.

== Season ==
St. Cloud produced one of the best seasons the program had ever seen in 1948. Led by star forward Sergio Gambucci, the Huskies got off to a tremendous start, winning their first five games of the year. Though they got a fight from St. John's, the Huskies largely controlled both ends of the ice which was highlighted by a 14–2 demolition of Bemidji State.

The Huskies ran into a rough patch in the middle of the season. After losing to a semi-pro outfit (Eagle River), St. Cloud met Michigan Tech on their home ice and swamped by the powerful engineers. The Huskies recovered afterwards and put up two more victories to keep their record spotless against Minnesota outfits.

After the second game against Duluth, one of the cars that was transporting players to the Eveleth game crashed into a bus. In the accident, Mel Janski banged up his knee while Cobby Saatzer was felled by a leg injury that would keep him out for the rest of the year. The hamstrung Huskies did what they could to win the match that night but they ended up losing 3–5 without two of their starting players.

The following week the team attended the Minnesota Winter Carnival and were still reeling from the injuries. Janski gutted through the pain and saw some ice time but it was up to the alternates to fill in for their afflicted comrades. While the reserves did their best, it was lineup regulars Gambucci, Strand and Braga who turned in stellar performances. After shutting out St. Thomas in the opening game, St. Cloud was able to just edge out St. John's for the third time that season and make the championship match. In the final game, St. Cloud peppered the St. Olaf cage with shots but the opposing netminder turned in a stirling performance to keep his team in the match. The Oles tied the game in the third and then stubbornly refused to let up in overtime. Two 5-minute periods elapsed without a goal, leading to a sudden-death session. In the third overtime, Jerry Adamic collected the game-winner on a pass from George Sachen to capture the championship.

After winning the title, St. Cloud had a bit of a letdown in their next game and barely escaped from Bemidji State with a 1–0 win. The team ended its season with a return match against Eveleth Junior College and avenged their earlier loss. The win left the team with a stellar record and a claim as the best college team in Minnesota other than the Golden Gophers.

== Roster ==
No.	Nat.	Player	Class	Pos	Height	Weight	DoB	Hometown	Previous team
		Gerald Adamic	Sophomore					Chisholm, Minnesota
		Larry Armstrong
		Al Braga	Senior	G
		Charles Cedarholm	Freshman
		Sergio Gambucci (C)		F			1923-01-11	Eveleth, Minnesota
		Bob Gill		D
		Bill Grimes
		Mel Janski	Sophomore	D				St. Cloud, Minnesota
		Blake Jaskowiak
		John Rosequist		G
		Rudy Saatzer	Sophomore	F				St. Cloud, Minnesota
		George Sachen
		Robert W. Strand	Senior	F				Eveleth, Minnesota

== Standings ==
1947–48 NCAA Independent ice hockey standings
	Intercollegiate							Overall					
	GP	W	L	T	Pct.	GF	GA	GP	W	L	T	GF	GA
Army	16	11	4	1	.719	78	39	16	11	4	1	78	39
Bemidji State	5	0	5	0	.000	13	36	10	2	8	0	37	63
Boston College	19	14	5	0	.737	126	60	19	14	5	0	126	60
Boston University	24	20	4	0	.833	179	86	24	20	4	0	179	86
Bowdoin	9	4	5	0	.444	45	68	11	6	5	0	56	73
Brown	14	5	9	0	.357	61	91	14	5	9	0	61	91
California	10	2	8	0	.200	45	67	18	6	12	0	94	106
Clarkson	12	5	6	1	.458	67	39	17	10	6	1	96	54
Colby	8	2	6	0	.250	28	41	8	2	6	0	28	41
Colgate	10	7	3	0	.700	54	34	13	10	3	0	83	45
Colorado College	14	9	5	0	.643	84	73	27	19	8	0	207	120
Cornell	4	0	4	0	.000	3	43	4	0	4	0	3	43
Dartmouth	23	21	2	0	.913	156	76	24	21	3	0	156	81
Fort Devens State	13	3	10	0	.231	33	74	–	–	–	–	–	–
Georgetown	3	2	1	0	.667	12	11	7	5	2	0	37	21
Hamilton	–	–	–	–	–	–	–	14	7	7	0	–	–
Harvard	22	9	13	0	.409	131	131	23	9	14	0	135	140
Lehigh	9	0	9	0	.000	10	100	11	0	11	0	14	113
Massachusetts	2	0	2	0	.000	1	23	3	0	3	0	3	30
Michigan	18	16	2	0	.889	105	53	23	20	2	1	141	63
Michigan Tech	19	7	12	0	.368	87	96	20	8	12	0	91	97
Middlebury	14	8	5	1	.607	111	68	16	10	5	1	127	74
Minnesota	16	9	7	0	.563	78	73	21	9	12	0	100	105
Minnesota–Duluth	6	3	3	0	.500	21	24	9	6	3	0	36	28
MIT	19	8	11	0	.421	93	114	19	8	11	0	93	114
New Hampshire	13	4	9	0	.308	58	67	13	4	9	0	58	67
North Dakota	10	6	4	0	.600	51	46	16	11	5	0	103	68
North Dakota Agricultural	8	5	3	0	.571	43	33	8	5	3	0	43	33
Northeastern	19	10	9	0	.526	135	119	19	10	9	0	135	119
Norwich	9	3	6	0	.333	38	58	13	6	7	0	56	70
Princeton	18	8	10	0	.444	65	72	21	10	11	0	79	79
St. Cloud State	12	10	2	0	.833	55	35	16	12	4	0	73	55
St. Lawrence	9	6	3	0	.667	65	27	13	8	4	1	95	50
Suffolk	–	–	–	–	–	–	–	–	–	–	–	–	–
Tufts	4	3	1	0	.750	17	15	4	3	1	0	17	15
Union	9	1	8	0	.111	7	86	9	1	8	0	7	86
Williams	11	3	6	2	.364	37	47	13	4	7	2	–	–
Yale	16	5	10	1	.344	60	69	20	8	11	1	89	85

== Schedule and results ==
Date	Opponent	Site	Result	Record
Regular Season
December 18	St. John's*	J. C. Brown Athletic Field • St. Cloud, Minnesota	W 3–0	1–0–0
January 7	Minnesota–Duluth*	J. C. Brown Athletic Field • St. Cloud, Minnesota	W 5–1	2–0–0
January 8	at St. John's*	St. Joseph, Minnesota	W 5–4	3–0–0
January 16	at Grand Rapids*	Grand Rapids, Minnesota	W 5–2	4–0–0
January 18	at Bemidji State*	Bemidji Sports Arena • Bemidji, Minnesota	W 14–2 ^{†}	5–0–0
January 22	at Eagle River*	Eagle River, Wisconsin	L 4–10	5–1–0
January 23	at Michigan Tech*	Dee Stadium • Houghton, Michigan	L 1–9	5–2–0
January 24	at Michigan Tech*	Dee Stadium • Houghton, Michigan	L 3–9	5–3–0
January 28	at North Dakota Agricultural*	Dee Stadium • Houghton, Michigan	W 6–4 ^{OT}	6–3–0
January 30	at Minnesota–Duluth*	Duluth Curling and Skating Club • Duluth, Minnesota	W 6–0 ^{†}	7–3–0
January 31	at Eveleth J. C.*	Eveleth, Minnesota	L 3–5	7–4–0
Minnesota State Tournament
February 5	vs. St. Thomas*	Saint Paul, Minnesota	W 3–0	8–4–0
February	vs. St. John's*	Saint Paul, Minnesota	W 3–2	9–4–0
February	vs. St. Olaf*	Saint Paul, Minnesota (Championship)	W 5–4 ^{3OT}	10–4–0
Regular Season
February ^{‡}	at Bemidji State*	J. C. Brown Athletic Field • St. Cloud, Minnesota	W 1–0	11–4–0
February 22	Eveleth J. C.*	J. C. Brown Athletic Field • St. Cloud, Minnesota	W 6–3	12–4–0
*Non-conference game.

† Bemidji State records the score of the game as 12–2 for St. Cloud. Duluth records have the score as 6–1 for the Huskies.
‡ No mention of this game appears in Bemidji State's records.

== Scoring statistics ==
Name	Position	Games	Goals	Assists	Points
Sergio Gambucci	F	16	28	10	38
Bob Strand	F	16	8	12	20
Mel Janski	D	13	6	8	14
George Sachen		16	8	1	9
Cobby Saatzer	F	10	5	3	8
Jerry Adamic		16	5	3	8
Blake Jaskowiak		16	3	5	8
Bob Gill	D	16	5	2	7
Larry Armstrong		14	4	2	6
Bill Grimes		14	1	0	1
Al Braga	G	-	0	0	0
John Rosequist	G	-	0	0	0
Total			73	46	119
