= 1947–48 North Dakota Agricultural Bison men's ice hockey season =

- Conference: Independent

Record
- Overall: 5–3–0

Coaches and captains
- Head coach: Don Bredell
- Captain: Don Bredell

The 1947–48 North Dakota Agricultural Bison men's ice hockey season was the 6th season of play for the program but first under the oversight of the NCAA. The Bison represented the North Dakota Agricultural College and were coached by Don Bredell, in his 1st season.

== Season ==
After nearly 20 years of dormancy, ice hockey officially returned to NDAC. Despite the sudden appearance of the Bison team, they performed well during the season and finished with a winning record. After opening the season 1-2, with losses to Concordia College and St. Cloud State, along with a 9-3 away win over Bemidji State Teachers College, in which coach/captain Bredell would score a hattrick. They would then reel off 4 straight wins, a 2-1 return victory over Bemidji, a 10-1 away win against Jamestown, and 2 victories over rival Concordia after which they would claim an Intercity Championship. The only real black mark on the season was an embarrassing loss to in-state rival North Dakota to cap the season, but the team was otherwise a pleasant surprise for the school.

== Roster ==
No.	Nat.	Player	Class	Pos	Height	Weight	DoB	Hometown	Previous team
		Lloyd Armstrong
		Don Bredell
		Richard Christianson
		Leland Delger
		George Effinger
		Lloyd Forness
		Dick Goehl
		Bob Johnson
		Paul Jones	Senior
		Ken Larson
		Fortune Martineau	Senior
		Roger Meilitzer
		Ken Melin
		Robert Olson
		Hugh Porter
		Doug Schnell
		Robert Shanks
		Jim Slingsby
		Robert Zehern

== Standings ==
1947–48 NCAA Independent ice hockey standings
	Intercollegiate							Overall					
	GP	W	L	T	Pct.	GF	GA	GP	W	L	T	GF	GA
Army	16	11	4	1	.719	78	39	16	11	4	1	78	39
Bemidji State	5	0	5	0	.000	13	36	10	2	8	0	37	63
Boston College	19	14	5	0	.737	126	60	19	14	5	0	126	60
Boston University	24	20	4	0	.833	179	86	24	20	4	0	179	86
Bowdoin	9	4	5	0	.444	45	68	11	6	5	0	56	73
Brown	14	5	9	0	.357	61	91	14	5	9	0	61	91
California	10	2	8	0	.200	45	67	18	6	12	0	94	106
Clarkson	12	5	6	1	.458	67	39	17	10	6	1	96	54
Colby	8	2	6	0	.250	28	41	8	2	6	0	28	41
Colgate	10	7	3	0	.700	54	34	13	10	3	0	83	45
Colorado College	14	9	5	0	.643	84	73	27	19	8	0	207	120
Cornell	4	0	4	0	.000	3	43	4	0	4	0	3	43
Dartmouth	23	21	2	0	.913	156	76	24	21	3	0	156	81
Fort Devens State	13	3	10	0	.231	33	74	–	–	–	–	–	–
Georgetown	3	2	1	0	.667	12	11	7	5	2	0	37	21
Hamilton	–	–	–	–	–	–	–	14	7	7	0	–	–
Harvard	22	9	13	0	.409	131	131	23	9	14	0	135	140
Lehigh	9	0	9	0	.000	10	100	11	0	11	0	14	113
Massachusetts	2	0	2	0	.000	1	23	3	0	3	0	3	30
Michigan	18	16	2	0	.889	105	53	23	20	2	1	141	63
Michigan Tech	19	7	12	0	.368	87	96	20	8	12	0	91	97
Middlebury	14	8	5	1	.607	111	68	16	10	5	1	127	74
Minnesota	16	9	7	0	.563	78	73	21	9	12	0	100	105
Minnesota–Duluth	6	3	3	0	.500	21	24	9	6	3	0	36	28
MIT	19	8	11	0	.421	93	114	19	8	11	0	93	114
New Hampshire	13	4	9	0	.308	58	67	13	4	9	0	58	67
North Dakota	10	6	4	0	.600	51	46	16	11	5	0	103	68
North Dakota Agricultural	8	5	3	0	.571	43	33	8	5	3	0	43	33
Northeastern	19	10	9	0	.526	135	119	19	10	9	0	135	119
Norwich	9	3	6	0	.333	38	58	13	6	7	0	56	70
Princeton	18	8	10	0	.444	65	72	21	10	11	0	79	79
St. Cloud State	12	10	2	0	.833	55	35	16	12	4	0	73	55
St. Lawrence	9	6	3	0	.667	65	27	13	8	4	1	95	50
Suffolk	–	–	–	–	–	–	–	–	–	–	–	–	–
Tufts	4	3	1	0	.750	17	15	4	3	1	0	17	15
Union	9	1	8	0	.111	7	86	9	1	8	0	7	86
Williams	11	3	6	2	.364	37	47	13	4	7	2	–	–
Yale	16	5	10	1	.344	60	69	20	8	11	1	89	85

== Schedule and results ==
Date	Opponent	Site	Result	Record
Regular Season
January 16	Concordia*	Fargo Island Park • Fargo, North Dakota	L 1—4	0-1-0
January 25	at Bemidji State*	Bemidji Sports Arena • Bemidji, Minnesota	W 9–3	1-1-0
January 28	at St. Cloud State*	J. C. Brown Athletic Field • St. Cloud, Minnesota	L 4–6 ^{OT}	1-2-0
January 31	Bemidji State*	Fargo Island Park • Fargo, North Dakota	W 2–1	2-2-0
	at Jamestown*	Jamestown, North Dakota	W 10–1	3-2-0
February 10	Concordia*	Fargo Island Park • Fargo, North Dakota	W 6–1	4-2-0
February 25	Concordia*	Fargo Island Park • Fargo, North Dakota	W 5–0	5-2-0
February 27	at North Dakota*	Winter Sports Building • Grand Forks, North Dakota	L 6–17 ^{†}	5-3-0
*Non-conference game.

† North Dakota records have the final score being 17–8 in their favor.
