= 1947–48 Minnesota–Duluth Bulldogs men's ice hockey season =

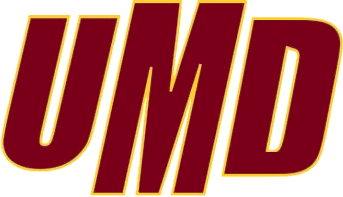
- Conference: Independent
- Home ice: Duluth Curling and Skating Club

Record
- Overall: 6–3–0

Coaches and captains
- Head coach: Hank Jensen
- Captain: Gord Eddolls

The 1947–48 Minnesota–Duluth Bulldogs men's ice hockey season was the 4th season of play for the program but first under the oversight of the NCAA. The Bulldogs represented the University of Minnesota Duluth and were coached by Hank Jensen in his 1st season.

== Roster ==
| No. | Nat. | Player | Class | Pos | Height | Weight | DoB | Hometown | Previous team |
|---|---|---|---|---|---|---|---|---|---|
| 55 | | Ed Berry | Sophomore | D | | | | Duluth, Minnesota |
| 62 | | Gordon Eddolls (C) | Junior | D | | | | Montreal, Quebec |
| 64 | | Jack Peterson | | F | | | | Duluth, Minnesota |
| 66 | | John Braff | | F | | | | Duluth, Minnesota |
| 69 | | Gordon Seitz |
| 71 | | John Amatuzio | | F | | | | Duluth, Minnesota |
| 72 | | John Sundberg | | D | | | | Duluth, Minnesota |
| 74 | | Norman Sundeen | Freshman | F | | | | Duluth, Minnesota |
| 76 | | Warren Johnson | | F | | | | Duluth, Minnesota |
| 77 | | Dave Persha | | F | | | | Duluth, Minnesota |
| 83 | | Ludwig Hiti | | G | | | | Eveleth, Minnesota |
| 84 | | Lyle Aho | | F | | | | Duluth, Minnesota |

== Standings ==
1947–48 NCAA Independent ice hockey standings
| | Intercollegiate | | | | | | | Overall | | | | | |
| | GP | W | L | T | Pct. | GF | GA | GP | W | L | T | GF | GA |
|---|---|---|---|---|---|---|---|---|---|---|---|---|---|
| Army | 16 | 11 | 4 | 1 | .719 | 78 | 39 | 16 | 11 | 4 | 1 | 78 | 39 |
| Bemidji State | 5 | 0 | 5 | 0 | .000 | 13 | 36 | 10 | 2 | 8 | 0 | 37 | 63 |
| Boston College | 19 | 14 | 5 | 0 | .737 | 126 | 60 | 19 | 14 | 5 | 0 | 126 | 60 |
| Boston University | 24 | 20 | 4 | 0 | .833 | 179 | 86 | 24 | 20 | 4 | 0 | 179 | 86 |
| Bowdoin | 9 | 4 | 5 | 0 | .444 | 45 | 68 | 11 | 6 | 5 | 0 | 56 | 73 |
| Brown | 14 | 5 | 9 | 0 | .357 | 61 | 91 | 14 | 5 | 9 | 0 | 61 | 91 |
| California | 10 | 2 | 8 | 0 | .200 | 45 | 67 | 18 | 6 | 12 | 0 | 94 | 106 |
| Clarkson | 12 | 5 | 6 | 1 | .458 | 67 | 39 | 17 | 10 | 6 | 1 | 96 | 54 |
| Colby | 8 | 2 | 6 | 0 | .250 | 28 | 41 | 8 | 2 | 6 | 0 | 28 | 41 |
| Colgate | 10 | 7 | 3 | 0 | .700 | 54 | 34 | 13 | 10 | 3 | 0 | 83 | 45 |
| Colorado College | 14 | 9 | 5 | 0 | .643 | 84 | 73 | 27 | 19 | 8 | 0 | 207 | 120 |
| Cornell | 4 | 0 | 4 | 0 | .000 | 3 | 43 | 4 | 0 | 4 | 0 | 3 | 43 |
| Dartmouth | 23 | 21 | 2 | 0 | .913 | 156 | 76 | 24 | 21 | 3 | 0 | 156 | 81 |
| Fort Devens State | 13 | 3 | 10 | 0 | .231 | 33 | 74 | – | – | – | – | – | – |
| Georgetown | 3 | 2 | 1 | 0 | .667 | 12 | 11 | 7 | 5 | 2 | 0 | 37 | 21 |
| Hamilton | – | – | – | – | – | – | – | 14 | 7 | 7 | 0 | – | – |
| Harvard | 22 | 9 | 13 | 0 | .409 | 131 | 131 | 23 | 9 | 14 | 0 | 135 | 140 |
| Lehigh | 9 | 0 | 9 | 0 | .000 | 10 | 100 | 11 | 0 | 11 | 0 | 14 | 113 |
| Massachusetts | 2 | 0 | 2 | 0 | .000 | 1 | 23 | 3 | 0 | 3 | 0 | 3 | 30 |
| Michigan | 18 | 16 | 2 | 0 | .889 | 105 | 53 | 23 | 20 | 2 | 1 | 141 | 63 |
| Michigan Tech | 19 | 7 | 12 | 0 | .368 | 87 | 96 | 20 | 8 | 12 | 0 | 91 | 97 |
| Middlebury | 14 | 8 | 5 | 1 | .607 | 111 | 68 | 16 | 10 | 5 | 1 | 127 | 74 |
| Minnesota | 16 | 9 | 7 | 0 | .563 | 78 | 73 | 21 | 9 | 12 | 0 | 100 | 105 |
| Minnesota–Duluth | 6 | 3 | 3 | 0 | .500 | 21 | 24 | 9 | 6 | 3 | 0 | 36 | 28 |
| MIT | 19 | 8 | 11 | 0 | .421 | 93 | 114 | 19 | 8 | 11 | 0 | 93 | 114 |
| New Hampshire | 13 | 4 | 9 | 0 | .308 | 58 | 67 | 13 | 4 | 9 | 0 | 58 | 67 |
| North Dakota | 10 | 6 | 4 | 0 | .600 | 51 | 46 | 16 | 11 | 5 | 0 | 103 | 68 |
| North Dakota Agricultural | 8 | 5 | 3 | 0 | .571 | 43 | 33 | 8 | 5 | 3 | 0 | 43 | 33 |
| Northeastern | 19 | 10 | 9 | 0 | .526 | 135 | 119 | 19 | 10 | 9 | 0 | 135 | 119 |
| Norwich | 9 | 3 | 6 | 0 | .333 | 38 | 58 | 13 | 6 | 7 | 0 | 56 | 70 |
| Princeton | 18 | 8 | 10 | 0 | .444 | 65 | 72 | 21 | 10 | 11 | 0 | 79 | 79 |
| St. Cloud State | 12 | 10 | 2 | 0 | .833 | 55 | 35 | 16 | 12 | 4 | 0 | 73 | 55 |
| St. Lawrence | 9 | 6 | 3 | 0 | .667 | 65 | 27 | 13 | 8 | 4 | 1 | 95 | 50 |
| Suffolk | – | – | – | – | – | – | – | – | – | – | – | – | – |
| Tufts | 4 | 3 | 1 | 0 | .750 | 17 | 15 | 4 | 3 | 1 | 0 | 17 | 15 |
| Union | 9 | 1 | 8 | 0 | .111 | 7 | 86 | 9 | 1 | 8 | 0 | 7 | 86 |
| Williams | 11 | 3 | 6 | 2 | .364 | 37 | 47 | 13 | 4 | 7 | 2 | – | – |
| Yale | 16 | 5 | 10 | 1 | .344 | 60 | 69 | 20 | 8 | 11 | 1 | 89 | 85 |

== Schedule and results ==
| Date | Opponent | Site | Result | Record |
Regular Season
| | Duluth JC* | ? | W 5–2 | 1–0–0 |
| | Duluth JC* | ? | W 6–1 | 2–0–0 |
| | Macalester* | ? | L 2–3 | 2–1–0 |
| January 7 | at St. Cloud State* | J. C. Brown Athletic Field • St. Cloud, Minnesota | L 1–5 | 2–2–0 |
| January 30 | St. Cloud State* | Duluth Curling and Skating Club • Duluth, Minnesota | L 1–6 | 2–3–0 |
| February 8 | Bemidji State* | Duluth Curling and Skating Club • Duluth, Minnesota | W 4–3 | 3–3–0 |
| February 15 | at Bemidji State* | Bemidji Sports Arena • Bemidji, Minnesota | W 9–4 | 4–3–0 |
| | Carleton* | ? | W 4–1 | 5–3–0 |
| | Macalester* | ? | W 4–2 | 6–3–0 |
*Non-conference game.
