= 1947–48 Colorado College Tigers men's ice hockey season =

NCAA Tournament, Semifinal
- Home ice: Broadmoor Ice Palace

Record
- Overall: 19–8–0
- Home: 17–4–0
- Road: 2–4–0

Coaches and captains
- Head coach: Cheddy Thompson

The 1947–48 Colorado College Tigers men's ice hockey season was the 9th season of play for the program but first under the oversight of the NCAA. The Tigers represented Colorado College and were coached by Cheddy Thompson, in his 3rd season.

== Roster ==
No.	Nat.	Player	Class	Pos	Height	Weight	DoB	Hometown	Previous team
		Pete Alexander		F				Washington, D.C.
		Kedrick G. Freyschlag	Sophomore	D			1927-08-20	Glendale, California
		Howard Hushion	Senior	F				Montreal, Quebec
		Roy Ikola	Sophomore	G			1927-02-09	Eveleth, Minnesota
		Sonny MacDonald	Sophomore	F			1925-08-28	New Westminster, British Columbia
		Lawrence Meier	Junior	D				Estevan, Saskatchewan
		Jack L. Might	Senior				1925-08-28	Denver, Colorado
		Ron Newson	Junior	F				Regina, Saskatchewan
		Christopher P. Ray	Freshman	F			1924-04-18	Belmont, Massachusetts
		Richard Rowell	Junior	F				Winnipeg, Manitoba
		Thomas Seasons	Sophomore	F				Montreal, Quebec
		Joseph Slattery	Junior	F				Sutherland, Saskatchewan
		Halliday L Spellicy	Freshman				1929-05-06	Regina, Saskatchewan
		Bruce Stewart	Junior	D				Yorkton, Saskatchewan
		Harry Whitworth	Sophomore	F				Toronto, Ontario
		Clark Wilder	Freshman	G				Rochester, Minnesota
		Vernon R. Wishart	Junior					Lacombe, Alberta
		Milo Yalich	Sophomore	D			1924-07-22	Buhl, Minnesota

== Standings ==
1947–48 NCAA Independent ice hockey standings
	Intercollegiate							Overall					
	GP	W	L	T	Pct.	GF	GA	GP	W	L	T	GF	GA
Army	16	11	4	1	.719	78	39	16	11	4	1	78	39
Bemidji State	5	0	5	0	.000	13	36	10	2	8	0	37	63
Boston College	19	14	5	0	.737	126	60	19	14	5	0	126	60
Boston University	24	20	4	0	.833	179	86	24	20	4	0	179	86
Bowdoin	9	4	5	0	.444	45	68	11	6	5	0	56	73
Brown	14	5	9	0	.357	61	91	14	5	9	0	61	91
California	10	2	8	0	.200	45	67	18	6	12	0	94	106
Clarkson	12	5	6	1	.458	67	39	17	10	6	1	96	54
Colby	8	2	6	0	.250	28	41	8	2	6	0	28	41
Colgate	10	7	3	0	.700	54	34	13	10	3	0	83	45
Colorado College	14	9	5	0	.643	84	73	27	19	8	0	207	120
Cornell	4	0	4	0	.000	3	43	4	0	4	0	3	43
Dartmouth	23	21	2	0	.913	156	76	24	21	3	0	156	81
Fort Devens State	13	3	10	0	.231	33	74	–	–	–	–	–	–
Georgetown	3	2	1	0	.667	12	11	7	5	2	0	37	21
Hamilton	–	–	–	–	–	–	–	14	7	7	0	–	–
Harvard	22	9	13	0	.409	131	131	23	9	14	0	135	140
Lehigh	9	0	9	0	.000	10	100	11	0	11	0	14	113
Massachusetts	2	0	2	0	.000	1	23	3	0	3	0	3	30
Michigan	18	16	2	0	.889	105	53	23	20	2	1	141	63
Michigan Tech	19	7	12	0	.368	87	96	20	8	12	0	91	97
Middlebury	14	8	5	1	.607	111	68	16	10	5	1	127	74
Minnesota	16	9	7	0	.563	78	73	21	9	12	0	100	105
Minnesota–Duluth	6	3	3	0	.500	21	24	9	6	3	0	36	28
MIT	19	8	11	0	.421	93	114	19	8	11	0	93	114
New Hampshire	13	4	9	0	.308	58	67	13	4	9	0	58	67
North Dakota	10	6	4	0	.600	51	46	16	11	5	0	103	68
North Dakota Agricultural	8	5	3	0	.571	43	33	8	5	3	0	43	33
Northeastern	19	10	9	0	.526	135	119	19	10	9	0	135	119
Norwich	9	3	6	0	.333	38	58	13	6	7	0	56	70
Princeton	18	8	10	0	.444	65	72	21	10	11	0	79	79
St. Cloud State	12	10	2	0	.833	55	35	16	12	4	0	73	55
St. Lawrence	9	6	3	0	.667	65	27	13	8	4	1	95	50
Suffolk	–	–	–	–	–	–	–	–	–	–	–	–	–
Tufts	4	3	1	0	.750	17	15	4	3	1	0	17	15
Union	9	1	8	0	.111	7	86	9	1	8	0	7	86
Williams	11	3	6	2	.364	37	47	13	4	7	2	–	–
Yale	16	5	10	1	.344	60	69	20	8	11	1	89	85

== Schedule and results ==
Date	Opponent	Site	Result	Record
Regular Season
December 4	Omaha*	Broadmoor Ice Palace • Colorado Springs, Colorado	W 26–3	1–0–0
December 5	Omaha*	Broadmoor Ice Palace • Colorado Springs, Colorado	W 16–3	2–0–0
December 9	Saskatchewan*	Broadmoor Ice Palace • Colorado Springs, Colorado	L 4–8	2–1–0
December 10	Saskatchewan*	Broadmoor Ice Palace • Colorado Springs, Colorado	W 6–3	3–1–0
December 19	Minnesota*	Broadmoor Ice Palace • Colorado Springs, Colorado	W 8–5	4–1–0
December 20	Minnesota*	Broadmoor Ice Palace • Colorado Springs, Colorado	W 7–6	5–1–0
December 26	Michigan Tech*	Broadmoor Ice Palace • Colorado Springs, Colorado	W 7–6	6–1–0
December 27	Michigan Tech*	Broadmoor Ice Palace • Colorado Springs, Colorado	W 8–3	7–1–0
December 29	Harvard*	Broadmoor Ice Palace • Colorado Springs, Colorado	W 13–6	8–1–0
December 30	Harvard*	Broadmoor Ice Palace • Colorado Springs, Colorado	W 10–3	9–1–0
January 9	Wichita Flyers*	Broadmoor Ice Palace • Colorado Springs, Colorado	W 15–7	10–1–0
January 10	Wichita Flyers*	Broadmoor Ice Palace • Colorado Springs, Colorado	W 6–2	11–1–0
January 16	San Francisco Olympic Club*	Broadmoor Ice Palace • Colorado Springs, Colorado	W 7–4	12–1–0
January 17	San Francisco Olympic Club*	Broadmoor Ice Palace • Colorado Springs, Colorado	W 3–2	13–1–0
February 6	California*	Broadmoor Ice Palace • Colorado Springs, Colorado	W 6–5	14–1–0
February 7	California*	Broadmoor Ice Palace • Colorado Springs, Colorado	W 7–4	15–1–0
February 12	North Dakota*	Broadmoor Ice Palace • Colorado Springs, Colorado	L 4–8	15–2–0
February 13	North Dakota*	Broadmoor Ice Palace • Colorado Springs, Colorado	W 6–3	16–2–0
February 23	at Michigan Tech*	Dee Stadium • Houghton, Michigan	L 0–4	16–3–0
February 24	at Michigan Tech*	Dee Stadium • Houghton, Michigan	L 2–3	16–4–0
February 27	at Michigan*	Weinberg Coliseum • Ann Arbor, Michigan	L 1–3	16–5–0
February 28	at Michigan*	Weinberg Coliseum • Ann Arbor, Michigan	L 1–6	16–6–0
March 6	at Wichita Flyers*	Wichita, Kansas	W 10–0	17–6–0
March 7	at Wichita Flyers*	Wichita, Kansas	W 13–3	18–6–0
March 12	British Columbia*	Broadmoor Ice Palace • Colorado Springs, Colorado	L 5–9	18–7–0
March 13	British Columbia*	Broadmoor Ice Palace • Colorado Springs, Colorado	W 7–3	19–7–0
NCAA Tournament
March 18	Dartmouth*	Broadmoor Ice Palace • Colorado Springs, Colorado (NCAA Semifinal)	L 4–8	19–8–0
*Non-conference game.

Note: The University of Omaha played under club status at this time and was not a varsity program until 1997.

== Awards and honors ==
Player	Award	Ref
Joe Slattery	AHCA First Team All-American	
Ron Newson	NCAA All-Tournament First Team	
Bruce Stewart	NCAA All-Tournament Second Team	
Joe Slattery	NCAA All-Tournament Second Team	
