= 1947–48 Harvard Crimson men's ice hockey season =

College ice hockey season

- Conference: 3rd Pentagonal League
- Home ice: Boston Arena

Record
- Overall: 9–14–0
- Conference: 3–4–0
- Home: 5–1–0
- Road: 2–9–0
- Neutral: 2–4–0

Coaches and captains
- Head coach: John Chase
- Captain: John Lavalle

The 1947–48 Harvard Crimson men's ice hockey season was the 48th season of play for the program. The Crimson represented Harvard University and were coached by John Chase in his 4th season.

== Season ==
After having played just 20 games over the previous 2 seasons, Harvard was ready to finally shake off the last vestiges of World War II by putting together a 22-game slate, the most ambitious in the history of the program. Before the first game could be played, however, the Crimson encountered problems. One of the team's starting defensemen, Charlie Coulter, contracted viral pneumonia and would be out until after Christmas. His partner, Lou Preston, who was talented enough to be a candidate for the US Olympic Team, was then placed on probation and would be unavailable until after the mid-year exams. Without his top two blueliners, coach Chase had to rearrange the defense quickly for the team's opening games. Luckily for Harvard, Boston College was dealing with roster problems of their own while Brown was playing its first game in 9 years. This enabled the Crimson to open the year with a pair of wins.

Harvard's aspirations were diminished in after the third game when Harvard was thumped by Boston University but the team had the chance to show how good it was with a subsequent 5-game road trip that would tame them through Canada and out into the Midwest. The trip could hardly have gone worse for the Crimson as the team lost all 5 games and most by sizable margins. To make matters worse, John Crocker and Bill Yetman were injured during the trip and unable to compete in the final few games.

With the season spiraling out of control, coach Chase reshuffled the lines, moving Shawn McKean to the top unit with Dave Key and Wally Sears. With Dick Greeley holding the back end with the rest of the defensive corps, the offense stepped to the fore and helped Harvard arrest its slide by scoring 28 goals over two a two-game stretch. After an extended layoff, the scoring continued at a high pace in early February and nearly enabled the Crimson to reach .500.

While the team's 6-game losing streak meant that it would be nearly impossible for the Crimson to earn an NCAA tournament bid, the team could still play spoiler for other hopefuls as it sought to finish out she season strong. Unfortunately, Harvard had not been able to fully resolve its defensive issues and lost three consecutive games, all while averaging 5 goals themselves. After brief interlude when they defeated Williams, Harvard lost another trio of games and sat dead last in the Pentagonal League standings.

The team's final home stand in March saw the defense stiffen and hold Princeton to 2 goals. The following game, which was initially slated to be the last of the season, provided the Crimson with a 1–0 victory over Yale, the team's only shutout on the season. Because the season series with the Elis was a draw, a final rubber match between the two was added and took place the following week. The game turned out to be more of a brawl than a hockey game with both teams complaining about the lack of officiating. While Yale was the better team on the ice, tempers were running high all night and several fights broke out between the two teams. With just 75 seconds remaining in the match, Dave Abbott and Artie Moher got into a confrontation in front of the Yale cage. After being told to go to their respective locker rooms, the two reengaged and Abbott was hit in the mouth Moher's stick. He had to be taken to the local hospital where he received 12 stitches. In order to prevent further chaos, coach Chase pulled his players off of the ice and ended the game prematurely. While it was unclear at the time as to whether or not the game would be ruled a forfeit, eventually the final score was allowed to stand at 10–3 for Yale.

== Roster ==
No.	Nat.	Player	Class	Pos	Height	Weight	DoB	Hometown	Previous team
		David M. Abbot	Sophomore
		William A. Allen II	Sophomore
		Bramwell B. Arnold	Senior
		John R. Chase	Sophomore	G
		Coste
		Charles J. Coulter Jr.	Junior	D
		John Crocker Jr.	Graduate	F
		Fletcher
		Richard S. Greeley	Junior	D/F
		Myles D. Huntington	Sophomore	F
		Vincent W. Jones Jr.	Graduate
		Albert L. Key II	Sophomore
		David M. Key Jr.	Junior	F
		John E. Lavalle (C)	Graduate	G
		George G. Loring	Sophomore
		Mauran
		Quincy A. S. McKean Jr.	Sophomore
		George R. Minot II	Junior
		Thomas C. Moseley	Graduate
		Murphy
		Lewis T. Preston	Sophomore (RS)	D
		Richardson
		Walter S. Sears	Graduate	F
		Staples
		Lawrence W. Ward	Sophomore
		Stephen L. Washburn	Junior	D
		Harcourt Wood	Junior
		William E. Yetman	Junior	G

== Standings ==
1947–48 NCAA Independent ice hockey standings
	Intercollegiate							Overall					
	GP	W	L	T	Pct.	GF	GA	GP	W	L	T	GF	GA
Army	16	11	4	1	.719	78	39	16	11	4	1	78	39
Bemidji State	5	0	5	0	.000	13	36	10	2	8	0	37	63
Boston College	19	14	5	0	.737	126	60	19	14	5	0	126	60
Boston University	24	20	4	0	.833	179	86	24	20	4	0	179	86
Bowdoin	9	4	5	0	.444	45	68	11	6	5	0	56	73
Brown	14	5	9	0	.357	61	91	14	5	9	0	61	91
California	10	2	8	0	.200	45	67	18	6	12	0	94	106
Clarkson	12	5	6	1	.458	67	39	17	10	6	1	96	54
Colby	8	2	6	0	.250	28	41	8	2	6	0	28	41
Colgate	10	7	3	0	.700	54	34	13	10	3	0	83	45
Colorado College	14	9	5	0	.643	84	73	27	19	8	0	207	120
Cornell	4	0	4	0	.000	3	43	4	0	4	0	3	43
Dartmouth	23	21	2	0	.913	156	76	24	21	3	0	156	81
Fort Devens State	13	3	10	0	.231	33	74	–	–	–	–	–	–
Georgetown	3	2	1	0	.667	12	11	7	5	2	0	37	21
Hamilton	–	–	–	–	–	–	–	14	7	7	0	–	–
Harvard	22	9	13	0	.409	131	131	23	9	14	0	135	140
Lehigh	9	0	9	0	.000	10	100	11	0	11	0	14	113
Massachusetts	2	0	2	0	.000	1	23	3	0	3	0	3	30
Michigan	18	16	2	0	.889	105	53	23	20	2	1	141	63
Michigan Tech	19	7	12	0	.368	87	96	20	8	12	0	91	97
Middlebury	14	8	5	1	.607	111	68	16	10	5	1	127	74
Minnesota	16	9	7	0	.563	78	73	21	9	12	0	100	105
Minnesota–Duluth	6	3	3	0	.500	21	24	9	6	3	0	36	28
MIT	19	8	11	0	.421	93	114	19	8	11	0	93	114
New Hampshire	13	4	9	0	.308	58	67	13	4	9	0	58	67
North Dakota	10	6	4	0	.600	51	46	16	11	5	0	103	68
North Dakota Agricultural	8	5	3	0	.571	43	33	8	5	3	0	43	33
Northeastern	19	10	9	0	.526	135	119	19	10	9	0	135	119
Norwich	9	3	6	0	.333	38	58	13	6	7	0	56	70
Princeton	18	8	10	0	.444	65	72	21	10	11	0	79	79
St. Cloud State	12	10	2	0	.833	55	35	16	12	4	0	73	55
St. Lawrence	9	6	3	0	.667	65	27	13	8	4	1	95	50
Suffolk	–	–	–	–	–	–	–	–	–	–	–	–	–
Tufts	4	3	1	0	.750	17	15	4	3	1	0	17	15
Union	9	1	8	0	.111	7	86	9	1	8	0	7	86
Williams	11	3	6	2	.364	37	47	13	4	7	2	–	–
Yale	16	5	10	1	.344	60	69	20	8	11	1	89	85

1947–48 Pentagonal League standings
	Conference							Overall					
	GP	W	L	T	PTS	GF	GA	GP	W	L	T	GF	GA
Dartmouth †	7	7	0	0	1.000	49	20	24	21	3	0	156	81
Army	4	2	2	0	.500	12	17	16	11	4	1	78	39
Harvard	7	3	4	0	.429	31	33	23	9	14	0	135	140
Princeton	7	2	5	0	.286	23	31	21	10	11	0	79	79
Yale	7	2	5	0	.286	20	32	20	8	11	1	89	85
† indicates conference champion

== Schedule and results ==
Date	Opponent	Site	Result	Record
Regular Season
December 3	vs. Boston College*	Boston Arena • Boston, Massachusetts	W 4–3	1–0–0
December 4	at Brown*	Rhode Island Auditorium • Providence, Rhode Island	W 10–5 ^{OT}	2–0–0
December 10	vs. Boston University*	Boston Arena • Boston, Massachusetts	L 2–8	2–1–0
December 19	at McGill*	Montreal, Quebec	L 4–9	2–2–0
December 29	at Colorado College*	Broadmoor Ice Palace • Colorado Springs, Colorado	L 6–13	2–3–0
December 30	at Colorado College*	Broadmoor Ice Palace • Colorado Springs, Colorado	L 3–10	2–4–0
January 2	at Minnesota*	Minneapolis Arena • Minneapolis, Minnesota	L 6–8	2–5–0
January 3	at Minnesota*	Saint Paul Auditorium • Saint Paul, Minnesota	L 2–7	2–6–0
January 7	vs. Northeastern*	Boston Arena • Boston, Massachusetts	W 11–4	3–6–0
January 14	Brown*	Boston Arena • Boston, Massachusetts	W 17–3	4–6–0
February 3	vs. Northeastern*	Boston Arena • Boston, Massachusetts	L 7–8	4–7–0
February 4	Fort Devens State*	Boston Arena • Boston, Massachusetts	W 17–2	5–7–0
February 7	Army	Boston Arena • Boston, Massachusetts	W 7–1	6–7–0 (1–0–0)
February 11	vs. Boston University*	Boston Arena • Boston, Massachusetts	L 6–10	6–8–0
February 14	at Princeton	Hobey Baker Memorial Rink • Princeton, New Jersey	L 4–8	6–9–0 (1–1–0)
February 18	Dartmouth	Boston Arena • Boston, Massachusetts	L 5–10	6–10–0 (1–2–0)
February 21	at Williams*	Cole Field House Rink • Williamstown, Massachusetts	W 5–1	7–10–0
February 25	vs. Boston College*	Boston Arena • Boston, Massachusetts	L 1–6	7–11–0
February 28	at Dartmouth	Davis Rink • Hanover, New Hampshire	L 5–8	7–12–0 (1–3–0)
March 3	St. Nicholas Hockey Club*	Boston Arena • Boston, Massachusetts (Exhibition)	W 4–3	
March 6	at Yale	New Haven Arena • New Haven, Connecticut	L 3–4	7–13–0 (1–4–0)
March 10	Princeton	Boston Arena • Boston, Massachusetts	W 6–2	8–13–0 (2–4–0)
March 13	Yale	Boston Arena • Boston, Massachusetts	W 1–0	9–13–0 (3–4–0)
March 17	at Yale*	New Haven Arena • New Haven, Connecticut	L 3–10 ^{†}	9–14–0
*Non-conference game.

† Match ended with 75 seconds remaining in the game due to a brawl.
