= 1947–48 California Golden Bears men's ice hockey season =

- Conference: Independent

Record
- Overall: 6–12–0
- Home: 3–3–0
- Road: 2–8–0
- Neutral: 1–1–0

Coaches and captains
- Head coach: Julius Schroder
- Captain: Pat Finnegan

The 1947–48 California Golden Bears men's ice hockey season was the 18th season of play for the program but first under the oversight of the NCAA. The Bears represented the University of California, Berkeley and were coached by Julius Schroder.

== Season ==
After a rather poor season, Cal got under way early with a game before Thanksgiving. While they lost the match, it did reveal the two best players on the team, Pat Finnegan and Ian Watson. Cal played sparingly over the succeeding month but were able to get in enough practice time to improve their play and earn their first victory in the rematch with the Olympic Club. A couple of weeks afterwards, the Bears stunned British Columbia to the tune of 6–2 with Finnegan's hat-trick leading the way.

With renewed optimism, the team welcomed a pair of midwestern colleges to the Pacific for a three-game slate over the winter break. Cal kept close in all of the games but lost each match despite their best efforts. Though the losses stung, the team could hang their hat on drawing 5,500 spectators to the game in Los Angeles. That plus the potential of UCLA returning to the ice gave hope that the Golden Bears program would be able to continue. While the future appeared rosy, the present was a bit murky. Cal's losing streak was extended with another loss to the Olympic Club. Just before the exam break, Cal played 3 games with the Olympic Club, winning the first at home 7-3 behind 4 Finnegan goals, before losing the next 2 to bring their record to 3-7.

During the break, the team went on a 6,000 mile journey to play several other college teams. Their first stop was in Colorado where they took on one of the strongest outfits that season, the Colorado College Tigers. Once more, Cal was able to keep the score close in the two-game series but ended up dropping both contests. A few days later the team was in New England and were finally able to end their losing streak with a win over Yale. Unfortunately, Ian Watson was injured in the game when a puck struck him in the face. He finished the match but was out for the following night's tilt against Dartmouth. His absence couldn't have come at a worse time as the Indians were the best team in the nation and throttled the Golden Bears 4–13 while the green's backup netminder manned the goal crease for Cal.

Watson was healthy enough to return for the game at Brown and Cal proved to be the superior species of Bruin as the Golden Bears swamped the Brunos 10–4. Cal then travelled to face Michigan on their return trip but they were woefully outmatched by the superb Wolverine squad. The Maize and Blue trounced Cal 2–11 in the first meeting while Watson's stellar play allowed the team to at least save face in the rematch. While the trip didn't turn out as they might have hoped, the five losses they suffered were all against teams that would make the NCAA tournament. Cal ended its season with a final game against the Olympic Club and produced their best effort to date. Their performance in the 15–6 win was perhaps too little too late but Cal had performed well in many of their games despite possessing far fewer players than their collegiate opponents.

== Roster ==
No.	Nat.	Player	Class	Pos	Height	Weight	DoB	Hometown	Previous team
		Roy Brandreth		F
		George L. Butler	Senior
		Cy Cardiff		F/D
		Larry Collison		F
		John Daley		F
		Hugh Duberley		D
		Ed Felkel
		Pat Finnegan		F			1927-12-18	Eveleth, Minnesota
		Scotty Lanbecht		D
		Jim McIntire		D
		Bruce Watson		F
		Ian Watson		G				Calgary, Alberta
		Marvin Westover		F

== Standings ==
1947–48 NCAA Independent ice hockey standings
	Intercollegiate							Overall					
	GP	W	L	T	Pct.	GF	GA	GP	W	L	T	GF	GA
Army	16	11	4	1	.719	78	39	16	11	4	1	78	39
Bemidji State	5	0	5	0	.000	13	36	10	2	8	0	37	63
Boston College	19	14	5	0	.737	126	60	19	14	5	0	126	60
Boston University	24	20	4	0	.833	179	86	24	20	4	0	179	86
Bowdoin	9	4	5	0	.444	45	68	11	6	5	0	56	73
Brown	14	5	9	0	.357	61	91	14	5	9	0	61	91
California	10	2	8	0	.200	45	67	18	6	12	0	94	106
Clarkson	12	5	6	1	.458	67	39	17	10	6	1	96	54
Colby	8	2	6	0	.250	28	41	8	2	6	0	28	41
Colgate	10	7	3	0	.700	54	34	13	10	3	0	83	45
Colorado College	14	9	5	0	.643	84	73	27	19	8	0	207	120
Cornell	4	0	4	0	.000	3	43	4	0	4	0	3	43
Dartmouth	23	21	2	0	.913	156	76	24	21	3	0	156	81
Fort Devens State	13	3	10	0	.231	33	74	–	–	–	–	–	–
Georgetown	3	2	1	0	.667	12	11	7	5	2	0	37	21
Hamilton	–	–	–	–	–	–	–	14	7	7	0	–	–
Harvard	22	9	13	0	.409	131	131	23	9	14	0	135	140
Lehigh	9	0	9	0	.000	10	100	11	0	11	0	14	113
Massachusetts	2	0	2	0	.000	1	23	3	0	3	0	3	30
Michigan	18	16	2	0	.889	105	53	23	20	2	1	141	63
Michigan Tech	19	7	12	0	.368	87	96	20	8	12	0	91	97
Middlebury	14	8	5	1	.607	111	68	16	10	5	1	127	74
Minnesota	16	9	7	0	.563	78	73	21	9	12	0	100	105
Minnesota–Duluth	6	3	3	0	.500	21	24	9	6	3	0	36	28
MIT	19	8	11	0	.421	93	114	19	8	11	0	93	114
New Hampshire	13	4	9	0	.308	58	67	13	4	9	0	58	67
North Dakota	10	6	4	0	.600	51	46	16	11	5	0	103	68
North Dakota Agricultural	8	5	3	0	.571	43	33	8	5	3	0	43	33
Northeastern	19	10	9	0	.526	135	119	19	10	9	0	135	119
Norwich	9	3	6	0	.333	38	58	13	6	7	0	56	70
Princeton	18	8	10	0	.444	65	72	21	10	11	0	79	79
St. Cloud State	12	10	2	0	.833	55	35	16	12	4	0	73	55
St. Lawrence	9	6	3	0	.667	65	27	13	8	4	1	95	50
Suffolk	–	–	–	–	–	–	–	–	–	–	–	–	–
Tufts	4	3	1	0	.750	17	15	4	3	1	0	17	15
Union	9	1	8	0	.111	7	86	9	1	8	0	7	86
Williams	11	3	6	2	.364	37	47	13	4	7	2	–	–
Yale	16	5	10	1	.344	60	69	20	8	11	1	89	85

== Schedule and results ==
Date	Opponent	Site	Result	Record
Regular Season
November 18	Oakland Ice Oaks*	Berkeley Icelands • Berkeley, California (Exhibition)	L 3–14	
November 19	at Olympic Club*	Winterland Arena • San Francisco, California	L 2–3	0–1–0
December 3	Olympic Club*	Berkeley Icelands • Berkeley, California	W 9–8	1–1–0
December 16	British Columbia*	Berkeley Icelands • Berkeley, California	W 6–2	2–1–0
December 23	Minnesota*	Berkeley Icelands • Berkeley, California	L 4–5 ^{OT}	2–2–0
December 27	vs. Minnesota*	Pan Pacific Rink • Los Angeles, California	L 3–4	2–3–0
December 30	Michigan Tech*	Berkeley Icelands • Berkeley, California	L 5–6	2–4–0
January 7	at Olympic Club*	Winterland Arena • San Francisco, California	L 3–5	2–5–0
January 20	Olympic Club*	Berkeley Icelands • Berkeley, California	W 7–3	3–5–0
January 23	at Olympic Club*	Winterland Arena • San Francisco, California	L 3–6	3–6–0
January 24	Olympic Club*	Berkeley Icelands • Berkeley, California	L 4–6	3–7–0
February 6	at Colorado College*	Broadmoor Ice Palace • Colorado Springs, Colorado	L 5–6	3–8–0
February 7	at Colorado College*	Broadmoor Ice Palace • Colorado Springs, Colorado	L 4–12	3–9–0
February 11	at Yale*	New Haven Arena • New Haven, Connecticut	W 6–2	4–9–0
February 12	at Dartmouth*	Davis Rink • Hanover, New Hampshire	L 4–13	4–10–0
February 14	at Brown*	Rhode Island Auditorium • Providence, Rhode Island	W 10–4	5–10–0
February 16	at Michigan*	Weinberg Coliseum • Ann Arbor, Michigan	L 2–11	5–11–0
February 17	at Michigan*	Weinberg Coliseum • Ann Arbor, Michigan	L 2–4	5–12–0
February 21	vs. Olympic Club*	Fresno Ice Rink • Fresno, California	W 15–6	6–12–0
*Non-conference game.

== Awards and honors ==
Player	Award	Ref
Ian Watson	AHCA First Team All-American	
Pat Finnegan	AHCA First Team All-American	
