= 1947–48 Northeastern Huskies men's ice hockey season =

- Conference: 3rd NEIHL
- Home ice: Boston Arena

Record
- Overall: 10–9–0
- Conference: 8–6–0
- Home: 3–1–0
- Road: 3–2–0
- Neutral: 4–6–0

Coaches and captains
- Head coach: Herb Gallagher
- Captain: Donald Kerivan

The 1947–48 Northeastern Huskies men's ice hockey season was the 16th season of play for the program but first under the oversight of the NCAA. The Huskies represented Northeastern University and were coached by Herb Gallagher, in his 8th season.

== Roster ==
No.	Nat.	Player	Class	Pos	Height	Weight	DoB	Hometown	Previous team
		Robert F. Barry	Freshman
		Frank A. Bell Jr.	Freshman					Needham, Massachusetts
		James L. Bell	Freshman					Needham, Massachusetts
		Charles Blanchard
		John Conroy
		John Gustafson						Boston, Massachusetts
		John Heavey						Malden, Massachusetts
		Arnold Johannesen						Winthrop, Massachusetts
		Donald Kerivan (C)	Sophomore					Wellesley, Massachusetts
		George P. Makris	Sophomore					Wellesley, Massachusetts
		Robert McEwan
		Francis Matthews
		John Nason						Boston, Massachusetts
		Frank J. Rando	Freshman					Roslindale, Massachusetts
		James R. Reid	Sophomore					Wakefield, Massachusetts
		Leon Richardi						Brockton, Massachusetts
		Wilson L. Tilley	Freshman					Winthrop, Massachusetts

== Standings ==
1947–48 NCAA Independent ice hockey standings
	Intercollegiate							Overall					
	GP	W	L	T	Pct.	GF	GA	GP	W	L	T	GF	GA
Army	16	11	4	1	.719	78	39	16	11	4	1	78	39
Bemidji State	5	0	5	0	.000	13	36	10	2	8	0	37	63
Boston College	19	14	5	0	.737	126	60	19	14	5	0	126	60
Boston University	24	20	4	0	.833	179	86	24	20	4	0	179	86
Bowdoin	9	4	5	0	.444	45	68	11	6	5	0	56	73
Brown	14	5	9	0	.357	61	91	14	5	9	0	61	91
California	10	2	8	0	.200	45	67	18	6	12	0	94	106
Clarkson	12	5	6	1	.458	67	39	17	10	6	1	96	54
Colby	8	2	6	0	.250	28	41	8	2	6	0	28	41
Colgate	10	7	3	0	.700	54	34	13	10	3	0	83	45
Colorado College	14	9	5	0	.643	84	73	27	19	8	0	207	120
Cornell	4	0	4	0	.000	3	43	4	0	4	0	3	43
Dartmouth	23	21	2	0	.913	156	76	24	21	3	0	156	81
Fort Devens State	13	3	10	0	.231	33	74	–	–	–	–	–	–
Georgetown	3	2	1	0	.667	12	11	7	5	2	0	37	21
Hamilton	–	–	–	–	–	–	–	14	7	7	0	–	–
Harvard	22	9	13	0	.409	131	131	23	9	14	0	135	140
Lehigh	9	0	9	0	.000	10	100	11	0	11	0	14	113
Massachusetts	2	0	2	0	.000	1	23	3	0	3	0	3	30
Michigan	18	16	2	0	.889	105	53	23	20	2	1	141	63
Michigan Tech	19	7	12	0	.368	87	96	20	8	12	0	91	97
Middlebury	14	8	5	1	.607	111	68	16	10	5	1	127	74
Minnesota	16	9	7	0	.563	78	73	21	9	12	0	100	105
Minnesota–Duluth	6	3	3	0	.500	21	24	9	6	3	0	36	28
MIT	19	8	11	0	.421	93	114	19	8	11	0	93	114
New Hampshire	13	4	9	0	.308	58	67	13	4	9	0	58	67
North Dakota	10	6	4	0	.600	51	46	16	11	5	0	103	68
North Dakota Agricultural	8	5	3	0	.571	43	33	8	5	3	0	43	33
Northeastern	19	10	9	0	.526	135	119	19	10	9	0	135	119
Norwich	9	3	6	0	.333	38	58	13	6	7	0	56	70
Princeton	18	8	10	0	.444	65	72	21	10	11	0	79	79
St. Cloud State	12	10	2	0	.833	55	35	16	12	4	0	73	55
St. Lawrence	9	6	3	0	.667	65	27	13	8	4	1	95	50
Suffolk	–	–	–	–	–	–	–	–	–	–	–	–	–
Tufts	4	3	1	0	.750	17	15	4	3	1	0	17	15
Union	9	1	8	0	.111	7	86	9	1	8	0	7	86
Williams	11	3	6	2	.364	37	47	13	4	7	2	–	–
Yale	16	5	10	1	.344	60	69	20	8	11	1	89	85

1947–48 New England Intercollegiate Hockey League standings
	Conference							Overall					
	GP	W	L	T	PTS	GF	GA	GP	W	L	T	GF	GA
Boston University †	13	12	1	0	.923	86	40	24	20	4	0	179	86
Boston College *	10	9	1	0	.900	77	29	19	14	5	0	126	60
Northeastern	14	8	6	0	.571	108	79	19	10	9	0	135	119
Bowdoin	6	3	3	0	.500	32	38	11	6	5	0	56	73
MIT	14	5	9	0	.357	62	87	19	8	11	0	93	114
Middlebury	6	2	4	0	.333	27	48	16	10	5	1	127	74
New Hampshire	10	3	7	0	.300	42	56	13	4	9	0	58	67
Norwich	7	2	5	0	.286	25	50	13	6	7	0	56	70
Fort Devens State	11	3	8	0	.273	30	55	–	–	–	–	–	–
Colby	5	1	4	0	.200	17	27	8	2	6	0	28	41
† indicates conference champion * indicates conference tournament champion

== Schedule and results ==
Date	Opponent	Site	Result	Record
Regular Season
December 15	vs. MIT	Boston Arena • Boston, Massachusetts	W 6–4	1–0–0 (1–0–0)
December 16	at Fort Devens State	Skating Club of Boston Rink • Allston, Massachusetts	L 3–6	1–1–0 (1–1–0)
December 22	vs. Boston University	Boston Arena • Boston, Massachusetts	L 5–7	1–2–0 (1–2–0)
January 5	vs. Boston College	Boston Arena • Boston, Massachusetts	L 6–7	1–3–0 (1–3–0)
January 7	vs. Harvard*	Boston Arena • Boston, Massachusetts	L 4–11	1–4–0
January 10	at New Hampshire	UNH Ice Rink • Durham, New Hampshire	W 5–4	2–4–0 (2–3–0)
January 12	Middlebury	Boston Arena • Boston, Massachusetts	W 16–4	3–4–0 (3–3–0)
January 13	at Fort Devens State	Skating Club of Boston Rink • Allston, Massachusetts	W 8–1	4–4–0 (4–3–0)
January 17	at Dartmouth*	Davis Rink • Hanover, New Hampshire	L 3–11	4–5–0
January 26	New Hampshire	Boston Arena • Boston, Massachusetts	L 5–8	4–6–0 (4–4–0)
January 27	vs. Boston College	Boston Arena • Boston, Massachusetts	L 5–8	4–7–0 (4–5–0)
February 2	vs. Boston University	Boston Arena • Boston, Massachusetts	L 2–12	4–8–0 (4–6–0)
February 3	vs. Harvard*	Boston Arena • Boston, Massachusetts	W 8–7	5–8–0
February 9	Norwich	Boston Arena • Boston, Massachusetts	W 18–6	6–8–0 (5–6–0)
February 10	Colby	Boston Arena • Boston, Massachusetts	W 7–4	7–8–0 (6–6–0)
February 12	at Bowdoin	Delta Rink • Brunswick, Maine	W 12–4	8–8–0 (7–6–0)
March 2	vs. MIT	Boston Arena • Boston, Massachusetts	W 10–4	9–8–0 (8–6–0)
NEIHL Tournament
March 8	vs. Boston University*	Boston Arena • Boston, Massachusetts (NEIHL Semifinal)	W 8–5	10–8–0
March 9	vs. Boston College*	Boston Arena • Boston, Massachusetts (NEIHL Championship)	L 4–6	10–9–0
*Non-conference game.

== Awards and honors ==
Player	Award	Ref
Jim Bell	AHCA Second Team All-American	
