= 1947–48 Minnesota Golden Gophers men's ice hockey season =

- Conference: Independent
- Home ice: Minneapolis Arena; Saint Paul Auditorium

Record
- Overall: 9–12–0
- Home: 4–6–0
- Road: 4–6–0
- Neutral: 1–0–0

Coaches and captains
- Head coach: Elwin Romnes
- Captain: Bud Frick

The 1947–48 Minnesota Golden Gophers men's ice hockey season was the 27th season of play for the program but first under the oversight of the NCAA. The Golden Gophers represented the University of Minnesota and were coached by Elwin Romnes in his 1st season.

== Season ==
"Doc" Romnes took over after the retirement of long-time coach, Larry Armstrong and put the team through its paces. Early in the season, Minnesota welcomed in a junior team from Winnipeg as a tune-up for their slate of collegiate opponents. The Canadiens already had several games under their belt and they used that experience to full effect, dropping the Gophers in back-to-back contests. After the game, Romnes switched up his forward lines in the hopes of producing a better result for the team. However, the Gophers lost each of the next three games. They were able to get wins in the two matches against California to salvage their 10-day road trip, but the team was likely already out of the running for an NCAA tournament berth.

When the team returned home they dispatched Harvard in a pair of games to give their fans some hope. The reprieve was short, however, as the Gophers lost the next 5 games and lost any chance they had at being in the postseason. To make matters worse, just prior to the series with North Dakota, the team lost its starting goalie, Jack McEwan, due to academic ineligibility and would have to rely in Ken Austin for the remainder of the year.

The team recovered to go 5–2 in the later portion of the season but that could not stop the Gophers from ending the year with a losing record for the first time in a decade.

== Roster ==
| No. | Nat. | Player | Class | Pos | Height | Weight | DoB | Hometown | Previous team |
|---|---|---|---|---|---|---|---|---|---|
| | | James W. Alley | | D |
| | | Kenneth L. Austin | | G |
| | | Dennis H. Bergman | | D |
| | | Ruben E. Bjorkman | | F | | | 1929-02-12 | Roseau, Minnesota |
| | | John L. Bonner |
| | | Thomas A. Connelly |
| | | Roland DePaul | Junior | F | | | | Eveleth, Minnesota |
| | | Calvin J. Engelstad |
| | | Robert W. Flemming | Junior | F | | | | Winnipeg, Manitoba |
| | | James E. Frick | | F |
| | | Richard Geddes |
| | | Robert V. Harris | | F |
| | | William Hodgins | | F |
| | | C. Howard Johnson | Junior | | | | | Minneapolis, Minnesota |
| | | Jerry H. Lindegard | | F |
| | | John C. McEwan | | G |
| | | John O. O'Brien | | D |
| | | Gerald M. Remole |
| | | Richard B. Roberts | | D |
| | | Robert Wold | | G |

== Standings ==
1947–48 NCAA Independent ice hockey standings
| | Intercollegiate | | | | | | | Overall | | | | | |
| | GP | W | L | T | Pct. | GF | GA | GP | W | L | T | GF | GA |
|---|---|---|---|---|---|---|---|---|---|---|---|---|---|
| Army | 16 | 11 | 4 | 1 | .719 | 78 | 39 | 16 | 11 | 4 | 1 | 78 | 39 |
| Bemidji State | 5 | 0 | 5 | 0 | .000 | 13 | 36 | 10 | 2 | 8 | 0 | 37 | 63 |
| Boston College | 19 | 14 | 5 | 0 | .737 | 126 | 60 | 19 | 14 | 5 | 0 | 126 | 60 |
| Boston University | 24 | 20 | 4 | 0 | .833 | 179 | 86 | 24 | 20 | 4 | 0 | 179 | 86 |
| Bowdoin | 9 | 4 | 5 | 0 | .444 | 45 | 68 | 11 | 6 | 5 | 0 | 56 | 73 |
| Brown | 14 | 5 | 9 | 0 | .357 | 61 | 91 | 14 | 5 | 9 | 0 | 61 | 91 |
| California | 10 | 2 | 8 | 0 | .200 | 45 | 67 | 18 | 6 | 12 | 0 | 94 | 106 |
| Clarkson | 12 | 5 | 6 | 1 | .458 | 67 | 39 | 17 | 10 | 6 | 1 | 96 | 54 |
| Colby | 8 | 2 | 6 | 0 | .250 | 28 | 41 | 8 | 2 | 6 | 0 | 28 | 41 |
| Colgate | 10 | 7 | 3 | 0 | .700 | 54 | 34 | 13 | 10 | 3 | 0 | 83 | 45 |
| Colorado College | 14 | 9 | 5 | 0 | .643 | 84 | 73 | 27 | 19 | 8 | 0 | 207 | 120 |
| Cornell | 4 | 0 | 4 | 0 | .000 | 3 | 43 | 4 | 0 | 4 | 0 | 3 | 43 |
| Dartmouth | 23 | 21 | 2 | 0 | .913 | 156 | 76 | 24 | 21 | 3 | 0 | 156 | 81 |
| Fort Devens State | 13 | 3 | 10 | 0 | .231 | 33 | 74 | – | – | – | – | – | – |
| Georgetown | 3 | 2 | 1 | 0 | .667 | 12 | 11 | 7 | 5 | 2 | 0 | 37 | 21 |
| Hamilton | – | – | – | – | – | – | – | 14 | 7 | 7 | 0 | – | – |
| Harvard | 22 | 9 | 13 | 0 | .409 | 131 | 131 | 23 | 9 | 14 | 0 | 135 | 140 |
| Lehigh | 9 | 0 | 9 | 0 | .000 | 10 | 100 | 11 | 0 | 11 | 0 | 14 | 113 |
| Massachusetts | 2 | 0 | 2 | 0 | .000 | 1 | 23 | 3 | 0 | 3 | 0 | 3 | 30 |
| Michigan | 18 | 16 | 2 | 0 | .889 | 105 | 53 | 23 | 20 | 2 | 1 | 141 | 63 |
| Michigan Tech | 19 | 7 | 12 | 0 | .368 | 87 | 96 | 20 | 8 | 12 | 0 | 91 | 97 |
| Middlebury | 14 | 8 | 5 | 1 | .607 | 111 | 68 | 16 | 10 | 5 | 1 | 127 | 74 |
| Minnesota | 16 | 9 | 7 | 0 | .563 | 78 | 73 | 21 | 9 | 12 | 0 | 100 | 105 |
| Minnesota–Duluth | 6 | 3 | 3 | 0 | .500 | 21 | 24 | 9 | 6 | 3 | 0 | 36 | 28 |
| MIT | 19 | 8 | 11 | 0 | .421 | 93 | 114 | 19 | 8 | 11 | 0 | 93 | 114 |
| New Hampshire | 13 | 4 | 9 | 0 | .308 | 58 | 67 | 13 | 4 | 9 | 0 | 58 | 67 |
| North Dakota | 10 | 6 | 4 | 0 | .600 | 51 | 46 | 16 | 11 | 5 | 0 | 103 | 68 |
| North Dakota Agricultural | 8 | 5 | 3 | 0 | .571 | 43 | 33 | 8 | 5 | 3 | 0 | 43 | 33 |
| Northeastern | 19 | 10 | 9 | 0 | .526 | 135 | 119 | 19 | 10 | 9 | 0 | 135 | 119 |
| Norwich | 9 | 3 | 6 | 0 | .333 | 38 | 58 | 13 | 6 | 7 | 0 | 56 | 70 |
| Princeton | 18 | 8 | 10 | 0 | .444 | 65 | 72 | 21 | 10 | 11 | 0 | 79 | 79 |
| St. Cloud State | 12 | 10 | 2 | 0 | .833 | 55 | 35 | 16 | 12 | 4 | 0 | 73 | 55 |
| St. Lawrence | 9 | 6 | 3 | 0 | .667 | 65 | 27 | 13 | 8 | 4 | 1 | 95 | 50 |
| Suffolk | – | – | – | – | – | – | – | – | – | – | – | – | – |
| Tufts | 4 | 3 | 1 | 0 | .750 | 17 | 15 | 4 | 3 | 1 | 0 | 17 | 15 |
| Union | 9 | 1 | 8 | 0 | .111 | 7 | 86 | 9 | 1 | 8 | 0 | 7 | 86 |
| Williams | 11 | 3 | 6 | 2 | .364 | 37 | 47 | 13 | 4 | 7 | 2 | – | – |
| Yale | 16 | 5 | 10 | 1 | .344 | 60 | 69 | 20 | 8 | 11 | 1 | 89 | 85 |

== Schedule and results ==
| Date | Opponent | Site | Result | Record |
Regular Season
| December 5 | Winnipeg Canadiens* | Minneapolis Arena • Minneapolis, Minnesota | L 4–8 | 0–1–0 |
| December 6 | Winnipeg Canadiens* | Minneapolis Arena • Minneapolis, Minnesota | L 5–6 | 0–2–0 |
| December 19 | at Colorado College* | Broadmoor Ice Palace • Colorado Springs, Colorado | L 5–8 | 0–3–0 |
| December 20 | at Colorado College* | Broadmoor Ice Palace • Colorado Springs, Colorado | L 6–7 | 0–4–0 |
| December 22 | at Olympic Club* | Winterland Arena • San Francisco, California | L 4–7 | 0–5–0 |
| December 23 | at California* | Berkeley Icelands • Berkeley, California | W 5–4 | 1–5–0 |
| December 27 | vs. California* | Pan Pacific Rink • Los Angeles, California | W 4–3 | 2–5–0 |
| January 2 | Harvard* | Minneapolis Arena • Minneapolis, Minnesota | W 8–6 | 3–5–0 |
| January 3 | Harvard* | Saint Paul Auditorium • Saint Paul, Minnesota | W 7–2 | 4–5–0 |
| January 8 | Manitoba* | Minneapolis Arena • Minneapolis, Minnesota | L 5–6 | 4–6–0 |
| January 9 | Manitoba* | Minneapolis Arena • Minneapolis, Minnesota | L 4–5 | 4–7–0 |
| January 16 | at Michigan* | Weinberg Coliseum • Ann Arbor, Michigan | L 2–3 | 4–8–0 |
| January 17 | at Michigan* | Weinberg Coliseum • Ann Arbor, Michigan | L 1–5 | 4–9–0 |
| January 23 | at North Dakota* | Winter Sports Building • Grand Forks, North Dakota | L 3–5 | 4–10–0 |
| January 24 | at North Dakota* | Winter Sports Building • Grand Forks, North Dakota | W 7–4 ^{OT} | 5–10–0 |
| February 6 | at Michigan Tech* | Dee Stadium • Houghton, Michigan | W 6–5 | 6–10–0 |
| February 7 | at Michigan Tech* | Dee Stadium • Houghton, Michigan | W 7–3 | 7–10–0 |
| February 13 | Michigan* | Minneapolis Arena • Minneapolis, Minnesota | L 2–6 | 7–11–0 |
| February 14 | Michigan* | Minneapolis Arena • Minneapolis, Minnesota | W 5–4 ^{OT} | 8–11–0 |
| February 27 | Michigan Tech* | Minneapolis Arena • Minneapolis, Minnesota | W 7–4 | 9–11–0 |
| February 28 | Michigan Tech* | Minneapolis Arena • Minneapolis, Minnesota | L 3–4 | 9–12–0 |
*Non-conference game. ^{#}Rankings from USCHO.com Poll.

== Scoring statistics ==
| Player | Position | Games | Goals | Assists | Points | PIM |
|---|---|---|---|---|---|---|
| Roland DePaul | C | - | 22 | 9 | 31 | - |
| Bill Hodgins | W | - | 14 | 8 | 22 | - |
| Jerry Lindegard | C | - | 13 | 9 | 22 | - |
| Bud Frick | W | - | 8 | 10 | 18 | - |
| Richard Roberts | D | - | 11 | 3 | 14 | - |
| Total | | | | | | |

== Awards and honors ==
| Player | Award | Ref |
|---|---|---|
| Roland DePaul | AHCA Second Team All-American | |
