= 1947–48 Middlebury Panthers men's ice hockey season =

Silver Anniversary Hamilton Tournament, Champion
- Conference: 6th NEIHL
- Home ice: McCullough Arena

Record
- Overall: 10–5–1
- Conference: 2–4–0
- Home: 4–0–1
- Road: 4–5–0
- Neutral: 2–0–0

Coaches and captains
- Head coach: Duke Nelson
- Captain: Kyle Prescott

The 1947–48 Middlebury Panthers men's ice hockey season was the 23rd season of play for the program but first under the oversight of the NCAA. The Panthers represented Middlebury College and were coached by Duke Nelson, in his 6th season.

== Season ==
Middlebury's season began with a trip to Clinton, New York for a tournament held by Hamilton. The first two games could hardly have gone better for the Panthers as they pumped 39 goal into the net to post the two most overwhelming wins in program history. They concluded the series by defeated the host Continentals in a much closer game and began the year with a stirling record.

A week later, the team headed down to Boston to begin their conference slate and came away with mixed results. While they were swamped by Northeastern in the first game, the Panthers managed to pull out a victory against MIT the following night. By the end of the week they had returned to Vermont for their first two home games of the year and produced two more wins against in-state rivals. After coming from behind to force a tie with Williams, Jim Marchese broke a bone in his foot at practice and was expected to miss the remainder of the season.

he team did not play again until after the exam break. In their first game following the layoff, it appeared that the team had retained its form from earlier when they downed Union for the third time. However, they lost the very next evening to Norwich. The loss put them in 3rd place in the NEIHL standings but they had a rough road ahead. Before that happened, Middlebury wrapped up its unofficial state championship with a second won over Vermont. Unfortunately, the victory was bittersweet as Fluff Grocott joined Marchese on the injured list while Bill McNamara, the team's leading scorer, was removed from the team.

Middlebury ended its season with a southern swing and ended up losing its final three games of the year. While the loss to Army didn't harm the Panthers' chances for a postseason bid, the whitewashing at the hands of Boston College meant that the team needed to beat Boston University in order to finish in the top four. Against all odds, Middlebury put forth a commendable performance versus one of the nation's top teams but fell just short, losing 4–5. The pair of losses dropped the Panthers to 6th place, just behind MIT and Bowdoin and signaled the end of the season.

Robert H. Shahan served as team manager.

== Roster ==
No.	Nat.	Player	Class	Pos	Height	Weight	DoB	Hometown	Previous team
		Roger F. Cassavant	Junior	G			1926-08-24	Natick, Massachusetts
		Donald W. Christiansen	Freshman	G			1925-09-26	Slatersville, Rhode Island
		John V. Corbisiero	Sophomore				1926-08-08	Medford, Massachusetts
		Wendall F. Forbes	Freshman	F/D			1927-01-22	Melrose, Massachusetts
		Homer L. Gowing	Freshman				1926-05-08	West Newton, Massachusetts
		Robert Grocott	Freshman				1927-05-27	Melrose, Massachusetts
		John F. Guetens Jr.	Freshman	G			1928-09-20	West Haven, Connecticut
		James L. Marchese Jr.	Sophomore				1925-03-17	Springfield, Massachusetts
		William McNamara	Sophomore	D			1925-05-07	Melrose, Massachusetts
		Everett G. Painter	Junior				1928-08-01	Darien, Connecticut
		Alexander G. Petrie	Freshman				1923-01-05	Darien, Connecticut
		W. Kyle Prescott (C)	Junior				1927-03-17	Montreal, Quebec
		David E. Thompson	Junior				1925-04-07	Needham, Massachusetts
		Paul Thompson
		Dexter Whittinghill Jr.	Sophomore				1926-07-23	Newton Center, Massachusetts
		Robert J. Wilson	Sophomore				1926-04-25	West Newton, Massachusetts

== Standings ==
1947–48 NCAA Independent ice hockey standings
	Intercollegiate							Overall					
	GP	W	L	T	Pct.	GF	GA	GP	W	L	T	GF	GA
Army	16	11	4	1	.719	78	39	16	11	4	1	78	39
Bemidji State	5	0	5	0	.000	13	36	10	2	8	0	37	63
Boston College	19	14	5	0	.737	126	60	19	14	5	0	126	60
Boston University	24	20	4	0	.833	179	86	24	20	4	0	179	86
Bowdoin	9	4	5	0	.444	45	68	11	6	5	0	56	73
Brown	14	5	9	0	.357	61	91	14	5	9	0	61	91
California	10	2	8	0	.200	45	67	18	6	12	0	94	106
Clarkson	12	5	6	1	.458	67	39	17	10	6	1	96	54
Colby	8	2	6	0	.250	28	41	8	2	6	0	28	41
Colgate	10	7	3	0	.700	54	34	13	10	3	0	83	45
Colorado College	14	9	5	0	.643	84	73	27	19	8	0	207	120
Cornell	4	0	4	0	.000	3	43	4	0	4	0	3	43
Dartmouth	23	21	2	0	.913	156	76	24	21	3	0	156	81
Fort Devens State	13	3	10	0	.231	33	74	–	–	–	–	–	–
Georgetown	3	2	1	0	.667	12	11	7	5	2	0	37	21
Hamilton	–	–	–	–	–	–	–	14	7	7	0	–	–
Harvard	22	9	13	0	.409	131	131	23	9	14	0	135	140
Lehigh	9	0	9	0	.000	10	100	11	0	11	0	14	113
Massachusetts	2	0	2	0	.000	1	23	3	0	3	0	3	30
Michigan	18	16	2	0	.889	105	53	23	20	2	1	141	63
Michigan Tech	19	7	12	0	.368	87	96	20	8	12	0	91	97
Middlebury	14	8	5	1	.607	111	68	16	10	5	1	127	74
Minnesota	16	9	7	0	.563	78	73	21	9	12	0	100	105
Minnesota–Duluth	6	3	3	0	.500	21	24	9	6	3	0	36	28
MIT	19	8	11	0	.421	93	114	19	8	11	0	93	114
New Hampshire	13	4	9	0	.308	58	67	13	4	9	0	58	67
North Dakota	10	6	4	0	.600	51	46	16	11	5	0	103	68
North Dakota Agricultural	8	5	3	0	.571	43	33	8	5	3	0	43	33
Northeastern	19	10	9	0	.526	135	119	19	10	9	0	135	119
Norwich	9	3	6	0	.333	38	58	13	6	7	0	56	70
Princeton	18	8	10	0	.444	65	72	21	10	11	0	79	79
St. Cloud State	12	10	2	0	.833	55	35	16	12	4	0	73	55
St. Lawrence	9	6	3	0	.667	65	27	13	8	4	1	95	50
Suffolk	–	–	–	–	–	–	–	–	–	–	–	–	–
Tufts	4	3	1	0	.750	17	15	4	3	1	0	17	15
Union	9	1	8	0	.111	7	86	9	1	8	0	7	86
Williams	11	3	6	2	.364	37	47	13	4	7	2	–	–
Yale	16	5	10	1	.344	60	69	20	8	11	1	89	85

1947–48 New England Intercollegiate Hockey League standings
	Conference							Overall					
	GP	W	L	T	PTS	GF	GA	GP	W	L	T	GF	GA
Boston University †	13	12	1	0	.923	86	40	24	20	4	0	179	86
Boston College *	10	9	1	0	.900	77	29	19	14	5	0	126	60
Northeastern	14	8	6	0	.571	108	79	19	10	9	0	135	119
Bowdoin	6	3	3	0	.500	32	38	11	6	5	0	56	73
MIT	14	5	9	0	.357	62	87	19	8	11	0	93	114
Middlebury	6	2	4	0	.333	27	48	16	10	5	1	127	74
New Hampshire	10	3	7	0	.300	42	56	13	4	9	0	58	67
Norwich	7	2	5	0	.286	25	50	13	6	7	0	56	70
Fort Devens State	11	3	8	0	.273	30	55	–	–	–	–	–	–
Colby	5	1	4	0	.200	17	27	8	2	6	0	28	41
† indicates conference champion * indicates conference tournament champion

== Schedule and results ==
Date	Opponent	Site	Result	Record
Silver Anniversary Hamilton Tournament
January 1	vs. Union*	Russell Sage Rink • Clinton, New York (Silver Anniversary Game 1)	W 17–0	1–0–0
January	vs. Lehigh*	Russell Sage Rink • Clinton, New York (Silver Anniversary Game 2)	W 22–0	2–0–0
January	at Hamilton*	Russell Sage Rink • Clinton, New York (Silver Anniversary Game 3)	W 4–3	3–0–0
Regular Season
January 12	at Northeastern	Boston Arena • Boston, Massachusetts	L 4–16	3–1–0 (0–1–0)
January 13	at MIT	Boston Arena • Boston, Massachusetts	W 7–6	4–1–0 (1–1–0)
January 16	Norwich	McCullough Arena • Middlebury, Vermont	W 9–3	5–1–0 (2–1–0)
January 17	Vermont ^{†}*	McCullough Arena • Middlebury, Vermont	W 11–5	6–1–0
January 21	Williams*	McCullough Arena • Middlebury, Vermont	T 6–6 ^{OT}	6–1–1
January 28	at Union*	Union Rink • Schenectady, New York	W 13–0 ^{‡}	7–1–1
February 12	Union*	McCullough Arena • Middlebury, Vermont	W 16–2	8–1–1
February 13	at Norwich	Sabine Field Rink • Northfield, Vermont	L 2–3	8–2–1 (2–2–0)
February	Hamilton*	McCullough Arena • Middlebury, Vermont	W 4–2	9–2–1
February 21	at Vermont ^{†}*	Burlington, Vermont	W 5–1	10–2–1
February 25	at Army*	Smith Rink • West Point, New York	L 2–7	10–3–1
March 1	at Boston College	Boston Arena • Boston, Massachusetts	L 1–15	10–4–1 (2–3–0)
March 2	at Boston University	Boston Arena • Boston, Massachusetts	L 4–5	10–5–1 (2–4–0)
*Non-conference game.

† Vermont fielded a club team at this time
‡ Union records have the score of the game as 14–0
