= 1947–48 St. Lawrence Saints men's ice hockey season =

- Conference: Independent

Record
- Overall: 8–4–1
- Home: 0–1–1
- Road: 8–3–0

Coaches and captains
- Head coach: Paul Patten
- Captain: Jack Klemens

The 1947–48 St. Lawrence Saints men's ice hockey season was the 11th season of play for the program but 1st under NCAA oversight. The Saints represented St. Lawrence University and were coached by Paul Patten in his 1st season.

== Season ==
While the program made its return following World War II the year before, the school took the club seriously by bringing in Paul Patten to take over as coach from team captain Jack Klemens. This was necessary not only to help the club to move forward but also because Klemens was absent early in the year. The defensive stalwart was attending the training camp of the United States men's national ice hockey team in the hope of appearing at the upcoming Winter Olympics. While Klemens was away, another defensive player came to the fore when Gene DelVeccio, the team goaltender made a name for himself in the exhibition season.

After returning from the winter break, with Klemens back in a Saints uniform, the Larries opened against Westchester of the Amateur Hockey League and posted a solid victory. The next game was a prestige match against Princeton and the relatively inexperienced Saints managed to overcome one of the top teams in the nation. As if to demonstrate that the outcome wasn't a fluke, St. Lawrence then trounced Paul Smith's College 15–0, though it was only the second year of existence for the opposing college.

St. Lawrence fell from the ranks of the unbeaten in the next game but the team had put itself in a hole early by getting down 0–3 to Colgate early. They followed a similar pattern versus Clarkson and lost by an identical score. Needing to arrest their slide, the Saints got the jump on Williams at the end of the month shot into the lead. They never relinquished their advantage and managed to build a 5–1 edge in the third before two late goals made the score closer than the game was. The Larries followed that game with a tight defensive battle against Army with Klemens spotting the team a lead early in the first. Unfortunately, the Saints were unable to add to their lead and, despite DelVeccio's efforts, could not keep the Cadets from tying the game late. An interference call in overtime gave Army a penalty shot and they were able to capitalize and send St. Lawrence packing.

The ire at how that game ended boiled over into the next match which saw SLU hammer Union 17–0. Tom Gerard paced the team with 5 goals and 4 assists, tying two programs records that still stand as of 2023. The Larries continued their high-scoring pace in a tie with Cornwall and then avenged their earlier loss to Clarkson, hanging a 7–5 win over the Knights after being down 2–5 with just 15 minutes left in the match. Unfortunately, there was a bit of melancholy amidst the wins. Because Jack Klemens graduated after the fall session, he was no longer on the team and the Saints would have to soldier on without their top defender.

Doing his best to take over the leadership role, Gerard had another outstanding game against the Clinton Hockey Club. In what was a wild affair, both he and Ed Garbers scored 4 goals apiece while Gerard added 3 assists. The team's hot streak ended with a loss to Cornwall when they surrendered 4 goals in the final frame. After a rematch with Colgate was cancelled on an account of warm weather, S. Lawrence finished out their season with a win over Hamilton as the team got contributions from up and down the lineup.

The team was able to post the first winning season in program history despite not having a home rink. The Saints were forced to play on the road for most of the year and, aside from the temporary skating rink used during the Winter Carnival, they had to play any 'home' games at the Clarkson Arena.

Hal Schulley served as team manager.

== Roster ==
No.	Nat.	Player	Class	Pos	Height	Weight	DoB	Hometown	Previous team
		William F. Andes	Freshman	F			1927-04-01	Brooklyn, New York
		Robert M. Borab	Freshman	F				Brooklyn, New York
		Edward W. Crutchley	Senior					Brooklyn, New York
		Eugene C. Del Veccio	Freshman	G				Brooklyn, New York
		Edward J. Garbers	Sophomore	F			1926-03-07	Brooklyn, New York
		Thomas I. Gerard	Sophomore	F			1927-08-17	Fort Myer, Virginia
		Thomas Green	Senior	F				Islip, New York
		Edward L. Gunthrope	Freshman				1926-05-30	Brooklyn, New York
		John F. Klemens (C)	Senior	D	5' 10" (1.78 m)	170 lb (77 kg)	1921-12-28	Brooklyn, New York	New York Rovers (EHL)
		Jack D. Moten	Sophomore	D				Astoria, New York
		Michael F. Nardello	Sophomore	F				Astoria, New York
		Robert J. Tobin
		James J. Weeden		F			1925-06-22	Brooklyn, New York
		John P. Weeden	Sophomore	F				Brooklyn, New York
		Douglas G. Westerberg	Freshman				1925-10-23	Brooklyn, New York
		Robert A. Yeaton	Sophomore					Framingham, Massachusetts

== Standings ==
1947–48 NCAA Independent ice hockey standings
	Intercollegiate							Overall					
	GP	W	L	T	Pct.	GF	GA	GP	W	L	T	GF	GA
Army	16	11	4	1	.719	78	39	16	11	4	1	78	39
Bemidji State	5	0	5	0	.000	13	36	10	2	8	0	37	63
Boston College	19	14	5	0	.737	126	60	19	14	5	0	126	60
Boston University	24	20	4	0	.833	179	86	24	20	4	0	179	86
Bowdoin	9	4	5	0	.444	45	68	11	6	5	0	56	73
Brown	14	5	9	0	.357	61	91	14	5	9	0	61	91
California	10	2	8	0	.200	45	67	18	6	12	0	94	106
Clarkson	12	5	6	1	.458	67	39	17	10	6	1	96	54
Colby	8	2	6	0	.250	28	41	8	2	6	0	28	41
Colgate	10	7	3	0	.700	54	34	13	10	3	0	83	45
Colorado College	14	9	5	0	.643	84	73	27	19	8	0	207	120
Cornell	4	0	4	0	.000	3	43	4	0	4	0	3	43
Dartmouth	23	21	2	0	.913	156	76	24	21	3	0	156	81
Fort Devens State	13	3	10	0	.231	33	74	–	–	–	–	–	–
Georgetown	3	2	1	0	.667	12	11	7	5	2	0	37	21
Hamilton	–	–	–	–	–	–	–	14	7	7	0	–	–
Harvard	22	9	13	0	.409	131	131	23	9	14	0	135	140
Lehigh	9	0	9	0	.000	10	100	11	0	11	0	14	113
Massachusetts	2	0	2	0	.000	1	23	3	0	3	0	3	30
Michigan	18	16	2	0	.889	105	53	23	20	2	1	141	63
Michigan Tech	19	7	12	0	.368	87	96	20	8	12	0	91	97
Middlebury	14	8	5	1	.607	111	68	16	10	5	1	127	74
Minnesota	16	9	7	0	.563	78	73	21	9	12	0	100	105
Minnesota–Duluth	6	3	3	0	.500	21	24	9	6	3	0	36	28
MIT	19	8	11	0	.421	93	114	19	8	11	0	93	114
New Hampshire	13	4	9	0	.308	58	67	13	4	9	0	58	67
North Dakota	10	6	4	0	.600	51	46	16	11	5	0	103	68
North Dakota Agricultural	8	5	3	0	.571	43	33	8	5	3	0	43	33
Northeastern	19	10	9	0	.526	135	119	19	10	9	0	135	119
Norwich	9	3	6	0	.333	38	58	13	6	7	0	56	70
Princeton	18	8	10	0	.444	65	72	21	10	11	0	79	79
St. Cloud State	12	10	2	0	.833	55	35	16	12	4	0	73	55
St. Lawrence	9	6	3	0	.667	65	27	13	8	4	1	95	50
Suffolk	–	–	–	–	–	–	–	–	–	–	–	–	–
Tufts	4	3	1	0	.750	17	15	4	3	1	0	17	15
Union	9	1	8	0	.111	7	86	9	1	8	0	7	86
Williams	11	3	6	2	.364	37	47	13	4	7	2	–	–
Yale	16	5	10	1	.344	60	69	20	8	11	1	89	85

== Schedule and results ==
Date	Opponent	Site	Result	Record
Exhibition
December 6	at Cornwall Calumets*	Cornwall, Ontario (Exhibition)	L 2–4	
December 13	at Canadian Army*	Cornwall, Ontario (Exhibition)	W 15–2	
Regular Season
January 2	at Westchester*	Playland Arena • Rye, New York	W 8–3	1–0–0
January 3 ^{†}	at Princeton*	Hobey Baker Memorial Rink • Princeton, New Jersey	W 6–3	2–0–0
January 9	at Paul Smith's College*	Olympic Stadium • Lake Placid, New York	W 15–0	3–0–0
January 16	Colgate*	Clarkson Arena • Potsdam, New York	L 4–5	3–1–0
January 22	at Clarkson*	Clarkson Arena • Potsdam, New York (Rivalry)	L 4–5	3–2–0
January 30	at Williams*	Cole Field House Pond • Williamstown, Massachusetts	W 5–3	4–2–0
January 31	at Army*	Smith Rink • West Point, New York	L 1–2 ^{OT}	4–3–0
February 2	at Union*	Schenectady, New York	W 17–0	5–3–0
February 6	Cornwall Calumets*	Potsdam, New York (Winter Carnival)	T 5–5	5–3–1
February 7	at Clarkson*	Clarkson Arena • Potsdam, New York (Rivalry)	W 7–5	6–3–1
February 10	at Clinton Hockey Club*	Clinton, New York	W 13–9	7–3–1
February	at Cornwall Calumets*	Cornwall, Ontario	L 4–6	7–4–1
February 21	at Hamilton*	Russell Sage Rink • Clinton, New York	W 6–4	8–4–1
*Non-conference game.

† Princeton and St. Lawrence records disagree on the date of the game with the match being held on either January 3 or 5.

== Scoring statistics ==
Name	Position	Games	Goals	Assists	Points
Tom Gerard	F	15	23	19	42
Bill Andes	F	-	-	-	-
Bob Borab	F	-	-	-	-
Bud Crutchley	F	-	-	-	-
Ed Garber	F	-	-	-	-
Tom Green	F	-	-	-	-
Ed Gunthrope		-	-	-	-
Jack Klemens	D	-	-	-	-
Jack Moten	D	-	-	-	-
Mike Nardello	F	-	-	-	-
Bob Tobin		-	-	-	-
Jim Weeden	F	-	-	-	-
Jack Weeden	F	-	-	-	-
Doug Westerberg		-	-	-	-
Bob Yeaton		-	-	-	-
Gene Del Veccio	G	-	-	-	-
Total					

Note: St. Lawrence records include the totals from the two exhibition games.

== Goaltending statistics ==
Name	Games	Minutes	Wins	Losses	Ties	Goals Against	Saves	Shut Outs	SV %	GAA
Gene Del Veccio	14	803:50	-	-	-	52	-	2	-	3.88
