= 1947–48 Clarkson Golden Knights men's ice hockey season =

Intercollegiate hockey season

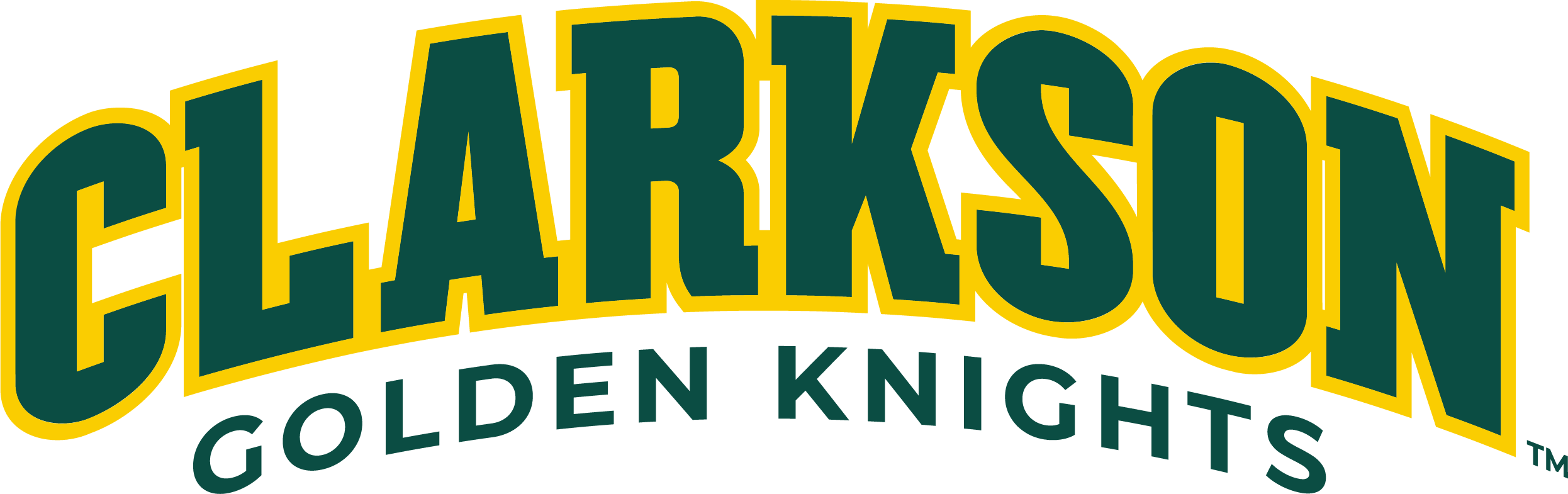
- Conference: Independent
- Home ice: Clarkson Arena

Record
- Overall: 10–6–1
- Home: 6–2–0
- Road: 4–3–1
- Neutral: 0–1–0

Coaches and captains
- Head coach: Jack Roos
- Captain: Pat French

The 1947–48 Clarkson Golden Knights men's ice hockey season was the 26th season of play for the program but first under the oversight of the NCAA. The Golden Knights represented the Clarkson College of Technology and were coached by Jack Roos, in his 17th season.

== Season ==
Entering the season, coach Roos had few returning players and had to rely on an influx of freshmen to help fill out the team. The result was that the team wasn't quite as cohesive as the squads that Roos had put together in the past but the Golden Knights still showed that they could compete at the same level as other top programs. After sweeping a series against Carleton, Tech jumped right into the fire with a game versus Dartmouth at Watertown, New York. The knights did well to limit one of the top offensive teams to just two goals but they were only able to get a single marker themselves. Clarkson then began a road trip with an overpowering performance against Champlain but couldn't quite pull out a victory over either Princeton or Yale.

Once they returned home, Clarkson appeared to be a bit tired from their junket and were soundly beaten by Colgate. After the worst performance of the season, Tech rallied to defeat nearby rival St. Lawrence before romping to two shutout wins over rather weak opponents. The rematch with Dartmouth ended with the same result as the first game, leaving little doubt that the Indians were the better team. Afterwards, Tech was able to defeat two more Canadian schools, but ended the year losing to a much improved Army squad.

The revamped lineup had shown some progress throughout the year but there was still room for improvement from the Knights. Unfortunately, coach Roos would not be around to lead the team; he retired from his position following the season after 19 years with the school.

Charles Hyde and Martin Gabey served as team managers.

== Roster ==
No.	Nat.	Player	Class	Pos	Height	Weight	DoB	Hometown	Previous team
4		Casselman
6		John Piers		D
8		Roy Hellyer	Junior	F				Montreal, Quebec
9		John F. O'Brien	Junior	F				Ogdensburg, New York
10		Richard Fitzpatrick	Sophomore	F				Belleville, Ontario
11		Malcolm White	Freshman	F				Smith Falls, Ontario
12		Norris A. Masterman	Junior	F				Westmount, Quebec
13		Douglas C. Folkner	Senior	F			1921-08-17	Great Meadows, New Jersey
14		Stirling B. Weedmark	Freshman	D				Carleton Place, Ontario
15		C. Murray Beach	Freshman	D				Cornwall, Ontario
18		Kenneth E. Brown	Freshman	D				Carleton Place, Ontario
19		Patrick French (C)	Senior	D			1922-05-25	Edmonton, Alberta
21		Robert W. Hyde	Senior	F				Malone, New York
22		Gerald C. Turner	Sophomore	G				Ottawa, Ontario
		Vernon Richardson	Senior	F				Montreal, Quebec

== Standings ==
1947–48 NCAA Independent ice hockey standings
	Intercollegiate							Overall					
	GP	W	L	T	Pct.	GF	GA	GP	W	L	T	GF	GA
Army	16	11	4	1	.719	78	39	16	11	4	1	78	39
Bemidji State	5	0	5	0	.000	13	36	10	2	8	0	37	63
Boston College	19	14	5	0	.737	126	60	19	14	5	0	126	60
Boston University	24	20	4	0	.833	179	86	24	20	4	0	179	86
Bowdoin	9	4	5	0	.444	45	68	11	6	5	0	56	73
Brown	14	5	9	0	.357	61	91	14	5	9	0	61	91
California	10	2	8	0	.200	45	67	18	6	12	0	94	106
Clarkson	12	5	6	1	.458	67	39	17	10	6	1	96	54
Colby	8	2	6	0	.250	28	41	8	2	6	0	28	41
Colgate	10	7	3	0	.700	54	34	13	10	3	0	83	45
Colorado College	14	9	5	0	.643	84	73	27	19	8	0	207	120
Cornell	4	0	4	0	.000	3	43	4	0	4	0	3	43
Dartmouth	23	21	2	0	.913	156	76	24	21	3	0	156	81
Fort Devens State	13	3	10	0	.231	33	74	–	–	–	–	–	–
Georgetown	3	2	1	0	.667	12	11	7	5	2	0	37	21
Hamilton	–	–	–	–	–	–	–	14	7	7	0	–	–
Harvard	22	9	13	0	.409	131	131	23	9	14	0	135	140
Lehigh	9	0	9	0	.000	10	100	11	0	11	0	14	113
Massachusetts	2	0	2	0	.000	1	23	3	0	3	0	3	30
Michigan	18	16	2	0	.889	105	53	23	20	2	1	141	63
Michigan Tech	19	7	12	0	.368	87	96	20	8	12	0	91	97
Middlebury	14	8	5	1	.607	111	68	16	10	5	1	127	74
Minnesota	16	9	7	0	.563	78	73	21	9	12	0	100	105
Minnesota–Duluth	6	3	3	0	.500	21	24	9	6	3	0	36	28
MIT	19	8	11	0	.421	93	114	19	8	11	0	93	114
New Hampshire	13	4	9	0	.308	58	67	13	4	9	0	58	67
North Dakota	10	6	4	0	.600	51	46	16	11	5	0	103	68
North Dakota Agricultural	8	5	3	0	.571	43	33	8	5	3	0	43	33
Northeastern	19	10	9	0	.526	135	119	19	10	9	0	135	119
Norwich	9	3	6	0	.333	38	58	13	6	7	0	56	70
Princeton	18	8	10	0	.444	65	72	21	10	11	0	79	79
St. Cloud State	12	10	2	0	.833	55	35	16	12	4	0	73	55
St. Lawrence	9	6	3	0	.667	65	27	13	8	4	1	95	50
Suffolk	–	–	–	–	–	–	–	–	–	–	–	–	–
Tufts	4	3	1	0	.750	17	15	4	3	1	0	17	15
Union	9	1	8	0	.111	7	86	9	1	8	0	7	86
Williams	11	3	6	2	.364	37	47	13	4	7	2	–	–
Yale	16	5	10	1	.344	60	69	20	8	11	1	89	85

== Schedule and results ==
Date	Opponent	Site	Result	Record
Regular Season
January 1	Carleton*	Clarkson Arena • Potsdam, New York	W 5–2	1–0–0
January 2	Carleton*	Clarkson Arena • Potsdam, New York	W 7–4	2–0–0
January 4	vs. Dartmouth*	Watertown, New York	L 1–2	2–1–0
January	at Champlain*	Burlington, Vermont	W 21–1	3–1–0
January 13	Princeton*	Hobey Baker Memorial Rink • Princeton, New Jersey	L 3–4 ^{OT}	3–2–0
January 14	at Yale*	New Haven Arena • New Haven, Connecticut	T 6–6 ^{OT}	3–2–1
January	Colgate*	Clarkson Arena • Potsdam, New York	L 2–6	3–3–1
January 22	St. Lawrence*	Clarkson Arena • Potsdam, New York (Rivalry)	W 5–4	4–3–1
January 24	Cornell*	Clarkson Arena • Potsdam, New York	W 10–0	5–3–1
January	at Champlain*	Burlington, Vermont	W 7–0	6–3–1
January 28	at Dartmouth*	Davis Rink • Hanover, New Hampshire	L 1–2	6–4–1
January 31	at McGill*	Montreal, Quebec	W 5–3 ^{‡}	7–4–1
February 7	St. Lawrence*	Clarkson Arena • Potsdam, New York (Rivalry)	L 5–7	7–5–1
February	Queen's*	Clarkson Arena • Potsdam, New York	W 6–3	8–5–1
February 12	Colgate*	Hamilton, New York	W 5–4	9–5–1
February	St. Patrick's*	Clarkson Arena • Potsdam, New York	W 7–3	10–5–1
March 6	at Army*	Smith Rink • West Point, New York	L 1–3	10–6–1
*Non-conference game.

‡ Contemporary reports have the score of the game 4–3 in Clarkson's favor.
