= Dick Rowell =

Canadian ice hockey player

- Born: Winnipeg, Manitoba, Canada
- Position: Forward
- Played for: Colorado College
- Playing career: 1941–1949

Richard Rowell is a former ice hockey forward who played for Colorado College in the 1940s.

== Career ==
Rowell began attending Colorado College in 1941, appearing briefly for the ice hockey team. The program was suspended after the United States entered World War II. Rowell was back with the program beginning in 1946 and he helped the Tigers rise to the top of the college hockey landscape. In his junior and senior season Rowell led his team in scoring and ended his career as the program's all-time leading scorer. He retained that distinction for only one season.

== Statistics ==
=== Regular season and playoffs ===
			Regular season					Playoffs
Season	Team	League	GP	G	A	Pts	PIM	GP	G	A	Pts	PIM
1941–42	Colorado College	NCAA	—	2	0	2	—	—	—	—	—	—
1946–47	Colorado College	NCAA	—	17	17	34	—	—	—	—	—	—
1947–48	Colorado College	NCAA	—	18	37	55	—	—	—	—	—	—
1948–49	Colorado College	NCAA	—	19	31	50	—	—	—	—	—	—
NCAA totals			69	56	85	141	—	—	—	—	—	—

== Awards and honors ==
Award	Year
AHCA First Team All-American	1948–49
