= Joseph Petroski =

American ice hockey coach

Biographical details
- Born: October 24, 1920; Exeter, New Hampshire
- Died: August 26, 2010 (aged 89); Exeter, New Hampshire
- Education: Miami University; University of New Hampshire; Harvard University

Coaching career (HC unless noted)
- 1947–1951: New Hampshire

Head coaching record
- Overall: 9–20–0

Joseph John 'Pat' Petroski (October 24, 1920 – August 26, 2010) was an ice hockey head coach for New Hampshire.

== Career ==
Petroski attended Miami University after graduating from Exeter High School in 1939. He left school to join the US Army and served in the signal corps during World War II. After returning home he attended the University of New Hampshire and received a BS in education and athletics. His first job was as a coach for his alma mater for the football, lacrosse and ice hockey programs. As the head coach for the ice hockey team Petroski has a subpar first season. Afterwards the region suffered from unseasonably warm weather and the Wildcats would only play seven games over the next two years (losing them all). When the weather started to return to normal for the 1950–51 season the team began to improve, finishing with a 5–4 record, but Petroski stepped down at the end of the campaign to focus on finishing his Master's degree.

He earned a PhD in education from Harvard University in 1960 and embarked on a long career in school administration. Over the course of his career he was a Principal, Head Master, Superintendent, Director of Extensions and Summer School and Professor of Education.

== Personal life ==
Petroski married his wife Ethel (née Simpson) in 1949 and they had one daughter named Ann. Joseph died at his home in August 2010 at the age of 89.

== Head coaching record ==
Record table
Season	Team	Overall	Conference	Standing	Postseason
New Hampshire Wildcats Independent (1947–1951)
1947–48	New Hampshire	4–9–0			
1948–49	New Hampshire	0–3–0			
1949–50	New Hampshire	0–4–0			
1950–51	New Hampshire	5–4–0			
New Hampshire:		9–20–0			
Total:		9–20–0			
National champion Postseason invitational champion Conference regular season champion Conference regular season and conference tournament champion Division regular season champion Division regular season and conference tournament champion Conference tournament champion
