= Bemidji Sports Arena =

Indoor, artificial ice rink

- Interactive map of Bemidji Sports Arena
- Location: 619 America Ave NW; Bemidji, Minnesota, 56601
- Coordinates: 47°28′27″N 94°53′06″W
- Owner: City of Bemidji

Construction
- Groundbreaking: 1935
- Opened: December, 1935
- Closed: January 4, 1949
- Demolished: 1949

Tenant
- Bemidji State Beavers men's ice hockey (1947–1949)

The Bemidji Sports Arena in Bemidji, Minnesota was a multipurpose indoor ice rink. Built originally in 1935, the venue was demolished after heavy snow caused the roof to collapse in January 1949.

== History ==
In the summer of 1935, the Bemidji city council cancelled plans to build a new airport hangar. Instead, they repurposed the $1,500 worth of timber that had been allocated for the project to build the first indoor ice rink for the town. After the local curling club agreed to chip in $2,000 towards construction and the local park board agreed to cover the maintenance costs once completed, the city began to move forward with the project. The former cite of Central High School, which had burned down in 1921, was chosen for the rink. Construction went quickly and the building was finished in time for the Christmas skating season.

Initially the venue was used for curling and public skating, however, figure skating events were soon held as well. In 1947, the local teachers college, Bemidji State, began to sponsor ice hockey as a varsity sport and they used the Sports Arena as their first home. During the winter of the following year, heavy snow accumulated on the roof of the building during the Christmas season. On January 4, the roof gave way and collapsed over the skater's section. Fortunately, there were few skaters on the ice at the time and no one was seriously injured. The building was razed afterwards as it could not be safely repaired. It would be more than 15 years before another indoor rink would be built in Bemidji.
