= Rhode Island Auditorium =

Building in Rhode Island, United States

- The Arena, The Main Event, Providence Auditorium
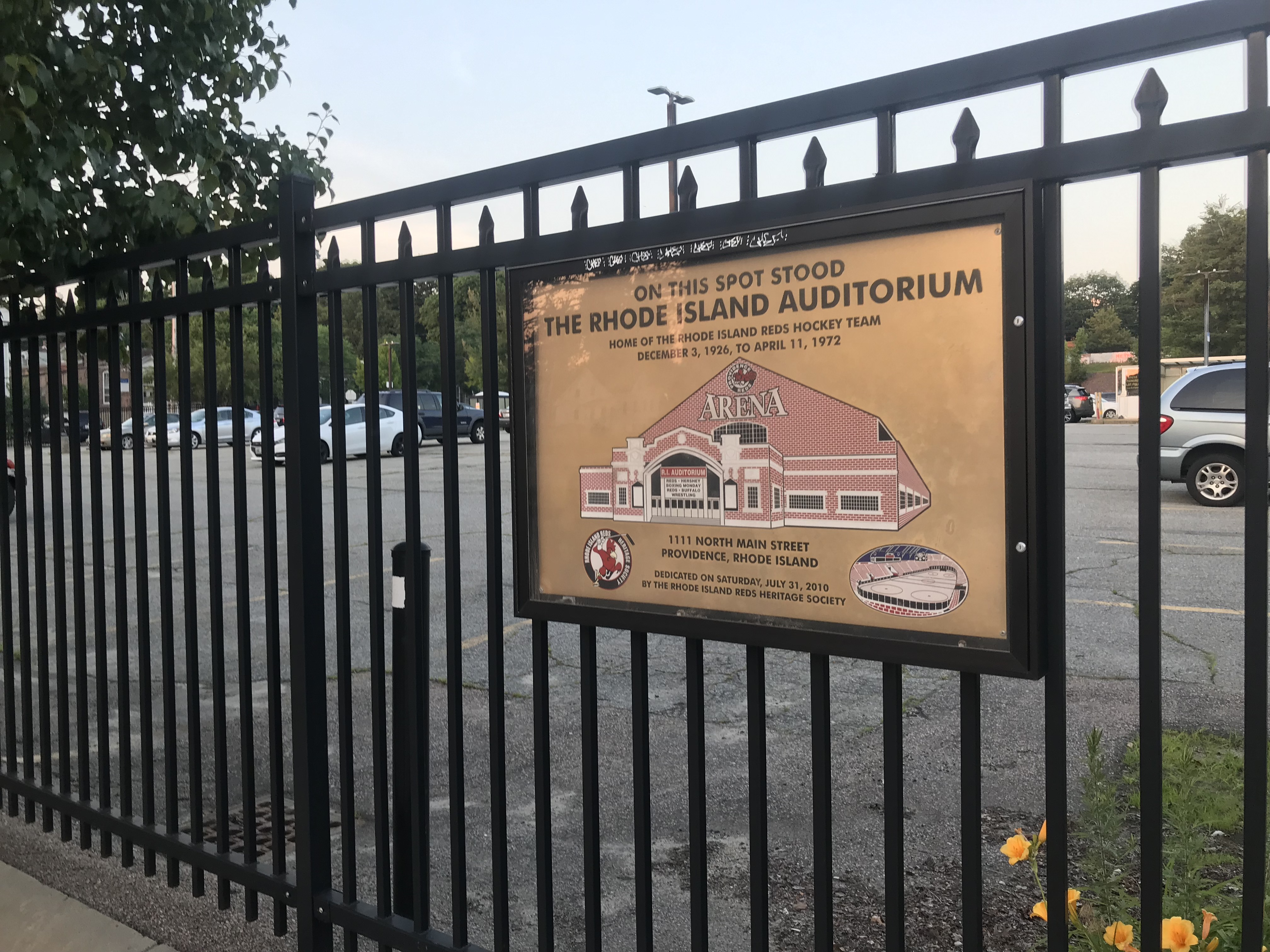
- Plaque commemorating the former site of the Rhode Island Auditorium.
- Interactive map of Rhode Island Auditorium
- Location: 1111 North Main Street, Providence, Rhode Island
- Coordinates: 41°51′2.34″N 71°24′6.34″W
- Owner: Hubert Milot, Louis A. R. Pieri(1938–1967)
- Operator: Louis A. R. Pieri (Manager, 1929)
- Capacity: 5,300
- Scoreboard: Yes

Construction
- Opened: February 18, 1926
- Demolished: 1989

Tenants
- Providence Reds (AHL) (1926–1972); Providence Steamrollers (BAA) (1946–1949); Providence Friars (NCAA) (1952–1973)

Rhode Island Auditorium was an indoor arena in Providence, Rhode Island, at 1111 North Main Street. It hosted the BAA's Providence Steamrollers from 1946 until 1949, and the Providence Reds ice hockey team until the Providence Civic Center (now the Amica Mutual Pavilion) was opened in 1972.

== Description and history ==
The arena held 5,300 people and opened in 1926. Through the years, a myriad of events including the Ice Capades, public skating, boxing, concerts, and religious events were held at the old barn. The venue hosted 28 of Rocky Marciano's 49 fights over a 4-year span, from July 12, 1948 (his second fight) to May 12, 1952 (his 41st), just four months before winning the heavyweight title by beating Jersey Joe Walcott in Philadelphia. After the Reds departed for the downtown Civic Center, the Auditorium, for a time, became a tennis venue.

At the height of the Great Depression in 1932, the arena faced financial ruin. Industrialist and Rhode Island hockey legend Malcolm Greene Chace rescued the auditorium from foreclosure.

In 1969, a concert by Sly and the Family Stone at the auditorium was followed by a riot. This led mayor Joseph A. Doorley to ban all rock concerts in Providence; the ban only lasted for a few months.

It was torn down in 1989 and parking affiliated with The Miriam Hospital now occupies the site. In 2009, the Rhode Island Reds Heritage Society, a group formed to commemorate the hockey team, marked the site with a plaque commemorating the team's existence.

== Concert dates ==
Date July 30 1972	Band Black Sabbath	Opening Act(s)
November 3, 1965	The Rolling Stones	
August 14, 1967	Herman's Hermits	The Who
July 18, 1968	The Who	
November 4, 1968	Cream	The Terry Reid Group
November 27, 1968	Jimi Hendrix	
May 17, 1969	Jimi Hendrix	Buddy Miles Express, Cat Mother & the All Night Newsboys
June 9, 1970	Crosby, Stills, Nash & Young	Country Funk
April 21, 1971	The Grateful Dead	
July 15, 1971	Creedence Clearwater Revival	
August 13–14, 1971	Chicago	

== See also ==
- Valley Arena Gardens, a similar venue of the era based in Holyoke, Massachusetts
