= 1947–48 Dartmouth Indians men's ice hockey season =

Pentagonal League, Champion NCAA Tournament, Runner-Up
- Conference: 1st Pentagonal League

Record
- Overall: 21–3–0
- Conference: 7–0–0
- Home: 10–0–0
- Road: 7–2–0
- Neutral: 4–1–0

Coaches and captains
- Head coach: Eddie Jeremiah
- Captain: Bill Riley

The 1947–48 Dartmouth Indians men's ice hockey season was the 42nd season of play for the program but first under the oversight of the NCAA. The Indians represented Dartmouth College and were coached by Eddie Jeremiah, in his 8th season.

== Season ==
With the NCAA instituting a national tournament for the first time for this season, Dartmouth was expected to be one of the two teams selected from the east for the competition. The Indians had won the last four eastern intercollegiate titles contested (one tied) and still boasted many of the players that had helped earn those championships. While they did lose scoring star Jack Riley to graduation, his place in the lineup was filled ably by brother Joe Riley, a transfer from the defunct program at Illinois. Joe was teamed with middle brother and team captain Bill Riley and Bob Merriam to form one of the top scoring lines in the nation and keep Dartmouth atop the college hockey landscape. The defense was also a strength of the team, led by Crawford Campbell and Bob Thayer, while Dick Desmond took on the role as the starter in goal.

After narrowly escaping Boston University in the season opener, Dartmouth settled in and reeled off several dominating victories. During the winter break the club headed to Buffalo and ran roughshod over the other three teams assembled. The Indians ran their hot start to a 7–0 mark before Boston College dented their record. The narrow defeat seemed to spur the team and they responded with several overpowering performances. The greens were, however, able to get their revenge against the Eagles in the rematch and continued their winning ways for the rest of the regular season.

Dartmouth reeled off 13 consecutive wins to finish their slate of game with a 20–1 record and were the obvious choice as the top eastern representative. However, before the beginning of the tournament, Dartmouth still had a few game to play. After the annual alumni game, the Indians headed up to Toronto to take on the eastern Canadian champions, the Toronto Varsity Blues. The northerners handed Dartmouth its worst defeat in eight years and shut out the Indians for the first time since February 1941. Just three days later, the team was in Colorado Springs and having to fight through both fatigue and a mile-high altitude as well as a strong Colorado College outfit. Dartmouth's scorers were not deterred and the team doubled up the nation's top offense to advance to the first national championship game in history.

The final game of the season pitted the top teams from each region and Dartmouth would have its hands full against Michigan. While the Wolverines weren't quite as productive on the offensive side as the Indians, their defense was possibly the best in the nation. The title tilt was kicked off by Michigan gaining a lead just 50 seconds into the game. Bill Riley tied the game shortly thereafter and the two then traded goals before the end of the first period to leave the score at 2-all. Dartmouth scored twice in the second period to take a 2-goal lead just past the midway point of the game. With everything appearing to break in the Indians' favor, the second half of the game turned into a tragedy for the greens.

Michigan cut the lead in half with five minutes remaining in the second. Just over a minute later, Gordon McMillan tied the score but the play was whistled down. Just prior to the goal, Al Renfrew had finished serving a penalty and had returned to the ice rather than his team's bench, as was required by some rules at the time. The referees decided to nullify the goal and the period ended 4–3 in Dartmouth's favor, however, Michigan's coach, Vic Heyliger protested during the intermission. The NCAA rules committee conferred and decided to reverse the decision, officially awarding Michigan the goal and leaving the two tied going into the third. While its unknown how this turn of events affected the team, it was the Wolverines' offense that provided the biggest turning point in the match. Michigan went on a tear in the final frame, scoring three times in the first seven minutes. Dartmouth was unable to respond and all of the shots they fired on goal were turned aside. Michigan finished the game on a 6-goal run and captured the inaugural national championship, much to the chagrin of the Dartmouth faithful.

== Roster ==
No.	Nat.	Player	Class	Pos	Height	Weight	DoB	Hometown	Previous team
		Robert J. Amirault	Junior	F			1924-01-21
		Crawford Campbell	Senior	D				Manchester, New Hampshire
		Walter H. Crowley	Junior	F			1925-04-23	Hingham, Massachusetts
		Richard J. Desmond	Junior	G			1927-03-02	Medford, Massachusetts
		Robert Gray		D
		Alan R. Kerivan	Freshman	F			1927-03-30	Wellesley, Massachusetts
		John D. Kilmartin Jr.	Junior	D			1925-08-07	Providence, Rhode Island
		Bruce A. Magoon	Sophomore	G			1927-08-23	Haverhill, Massachusetts
		James B. Malone	Senior	F			1926-05-06	Cambridge, Massachusetts
		Robert L. Merriam	Senior	F			1924-06-04	Greenfield, Massachusetts
		Arnold C. Oss Jr.	Sophomore	F			1928-04-19	Minneapolis, Minnesota
		George Pulliam	Graduate	D				Cranston, Rhode Island
		Howard L. Richmond	Sophomore	F
		Joseph A. Riley	Junior	F			1923-12-14	Medford, Massachusetts	Illinois
		William J. Riley (C)	Graduate	F			1921-10-06	Medford, Massachusetts
		William H. Taylor Jr.	Sophomore	F			1926-08-28	Buffalo, New York
		Robert N. Thayer	Junior	D			1923-03-13	Melrose, Massachusetts
		Thomas Warner	Junior

== Standings ==
1947–48 NCAA Independent ice hockey standings
	Intercollegiate							Overall					
	GP	W	L	T	Pct.	GF	GA	GP	W	L	T	GF	GA
Army	16	11	4	1	.719	78	39	16	11	4	1	78	39
Bemidji State	5	0	5	0	.000	13	36	10	2	8	0	37	63
Boston College	19	14	5	0	.737	126	60	19	14	5	0	126	60
Boston University	24	20	4	0	.833	179	86	24	20	4	0	179	86
Bowdoin	9	4	5	0	.444	45	68	11	6	5	0	56	73
Brown	14	5	9	0	.357	61	91	14	5	9	0	61	91
California	10	2	8	0	.200	45	67	18	6	12	0	94	106
Clarkson	12	5	6	1	.458	67	39	17	10	6	1	96	54
Colby	8	2	6	0	.250	28	41	8	2	6	0	28	41
Colgate	10	7	3	0	.700	54	34	13	10	3	0	83	45
Colorado College	14	9	5	0	.643	84	73	27	19	8	0	207	120
Cornell	4	0	4	0	.000	3	43	4	0	4	0	3	43
Dartmouth	23	21	2	0	.913	156	76	24	21	3	0	156	81
Fort Devens State	13	3	10	0	.231	33	74	–	–	–	–	–	–
Georgetown	3	2	1	0	.667	12	11	7	5	2	0	37	21
Hamilton	–	–	–	–	–	–	–	14	7	7	0	–	–
Harvard	22	9	13	0	.409	131	131	23	9	14	0	135	140
Lehigh	9	0	9	0	.000	10	100	11	0	11	0	14	113
Massachusetts	2	0	2	0	.000	1	23	3	0	3	0	3	30
Michigan	18	16	2	0	.889	105	53	23	20	2	1	141	63
Michigan Tech	19	7	12	0	.368	87	96	20	8	12	0	91	97
Middlebury	14	8	5	1	.607	111	68	16	10	5	1	127	74
Minnesota	16	9	7	0	.563	78	73	21	9	12	0	100	105
Minnesota–Duluth	6	3	3	0	.500	21	24	9	6	3	0	36	28
MIT	19	8	11	0	.421	93	114	19	8	11	0	93	114
New Hampshire	13	4	9	0	.308	58	67	13	4	9	0	58	67
North Dakota	10	6	4	0	.600	51	46	16	11	5	0	103	68
North Dakota Agricultural	8	5	3	0	.571	43	33	8	5	3	0	43	33
Northeastern	19	10	9	0	.526	135	119	19	10	9	0	135	119
Norwich	9	3	6	0	.333	38	58	13	6	7	0	56	70
Princeton	18	8	10	0	.444	65	72	21	10	11	0	79	79
St. Cloud State	12	10	2	0	.833	55	35	16	12	4	0	73	55
St. Lawrence	9	6	3	0	.667	65	27	13	8	4	1	95	50
Suffolk	–	–	–	–	–	–	–	–	–	–	–	–	–
Tufts	4	3	1	0	.750	17	15	4	3	1	0	17	15
Union	9	1	8	0	.111	7	86	9	1	8	0	7	86
Williams	11	3	6	2	.364	37	47	13	4	7	2	–	–
Yale	16	5	10	1	.344	60	69	20	8	11	1	89	85

1947–48 Pentagonal League standings
	Conference							Overall					
	GP	W	L	T	PTS	GF	GA	GP	W	L	T	GF	GA
Dartmouth †	7	7	0	0	1.000	49	20	24	21	3	0	156	81
Army	4	2	2	0	.500	12	17	16	11	4	1	78	39
Harvard	7	3	4	0	.429	31	33	23	9	14	0	135	140
Princeton	7	2	5	0	.286	23	31	21	10	11	0	79	79
Yale	7	2	5	0	.286	20	32	20	8	11	1	89	85
† indicates conference champion

== Schedule and results ==
Date	Opponent	Site	Result	Record
Regular Season
December 18	Boston University*	Davis Rink • Hanover, New Hampshire	W 6–5 ^{OT}	1–0–0
December 19	Devens State*	Davis Rink • Hanover, New Hampshire	W 10–3	2–0–0
December 29	vs. Williams*	Buffalo Memorial Auditorium • Buffalo, New York	W 7–1	3–0–0
December 31	vs. Colgate*	Buffalo Memorial Auditorium • Buffalo, New York	W 6–2	4–0–0
January 1	vs. Princeton*	Buffalo Memorial Auditorium • Buffalo, New York	W 5–1	5–0–0
January 4	vs. Clarkson*	Watertown, New York	W 2–1	6–0–0
January 10	Princeton	Davis Rink • Hanover, New Hampshire	W 6–2	7–0–0 (1–0–0)
January 12	at Boston College*	Boston Arena • Boston, Massachusetts	L 3–4	7–1–0
January 17	Northeastern*	Davis Rink • Hanover, New Hampshire	W 13–3	8–1–0
January 21	Brown*	Davis Rink • Hanover, New Hampshire	W 7–1	9–1–0
January 24	Yale	New Haven Arena • New Haven, Connecticut	W 6–0	10–1–0 (2–0–0)
January 26	at Boston University*	Boston Arena • Boston, Massachusetts	W 6–5	11–1–0
January 28	Clarkson*	Davis Rink • Hanover, New Hampshire	W 2–1	12–1–0
January 29	Boston College*	Davis Rink • Hanover, New Hampshire	W 6–4	13–1–0
February 12	California*	Davis Rink • Hanover, New Hampshire	W 13–4	14–1–0
February 14	Yale	Davis Rink • Hanover, New Hampshire	W 9–4	15–1–0 (3–0–0)
February 18	at Harvard	Boston Arena • Boston, Massachusetts	W 10–5	16–1–0 (4–0–0)
February 21	at Army	Smith Rink • West Point, New York	W 5–2	17–1–0 (5–0–0)
February 23	at Williams*	Cole Field House Rink • Williamstown, Massachusetts	W 9–1	18–1–0
February 28	Harvard	Davis Rink • Hanover, New Hampshire	W 8–5	19–1–0 (6–0–0)
March 6	at Princeton	Hobey Baker Memorial Rink • Princeton, New Jersey	W 5–2	20–1–0 (7–0–0)
March 12	Dartmouth Alumni*	Davis Rink • Hanover, New Hampshire (Exhibition)	L 4–8	
March 15	Toronto*	Varsity Arena • Toronto, Ontario	L 0–5	20–2–0
NCAA Tournament
March 18	at Colorado College*	Broadmoor Ice Palace • Colorado Springs, Colorado (NCAA Semifinal)	W 8–4	21–2–0
March 20	vs. Michigan*	Broadmoor Ice Palace • Colorado Springs, Colorado (NCAA Championship)	L 4–8	21–3–0
*Non-conference game.

== National championship game ==
=== Michigan vs. Dartmouth ===
March 20	Michigan	8 – 4	Dartmouth	Broadmoor Ice Palace

Scoring summary
Period	Team	Goal	Assist(s)	Time	Score
1st	UM	Wally Gacek	Grant	0:50	1–0 UM
1st	DC	Bill Riley	Merriam	4:25	1–1
1st	UM	Wally Gacek	Grant	10:55	2–1 UM
1st	DC	Crawford Campbell – PP	unasisted	17:25	2–2
2nd	DC	Walt Crowley	B. Riley	26:55	3–2 DC
2nd	DC	Arnold Oss	Malone	31:05	4–2 DC
2nd	UM	Wally Grant	Gacek	35:20	4–3 DC
2nd	UM	Gordon McMillan	Greer	36:40	4–4
3rd	UM	Wally Grant– GW	Gacek and Greer	41:30	5–4 UM
3rd	UM	Gordon McMillan	Renfrew	46:15	6–4 UM
3rd	UM	Wally Gacek	Grant and Greer	46:20	7–4 UM
3rd	UM	Ted Greer	Gacek	55:14	8–4 UM

Shots by period
Team	1	2	3	T
Michigan	10	13	18	41
Dartmouth	12	9	8	29

Goaltenders
Team	Name	Saves	Goals against	Time on ice
UM	Jack McDonald	25	4	
DC	Dick Desmond	33	8	

== Scoring statistics ==
Name	Position	Games	Goals	Assists	Points	PIM
Bob Amirault	F	-	-	-	-	-
Crawford Campbell	D	-	-	-	-	-
Walt Crowley	F	-	-	-	-	-
Dick Desmond	G	-	-	-	-	-
Bob Gray	D	-	-	-	-	-
Alan Kerivan	F	-	-	-	-	-
John Kilmartin	D	-	-	-	-	-
Bruce Magoon	G	-	-	-	-	-
Jim Malone	F	-	-	-	-	-
Bob Merriam	C/LW	-	-	-	-	-
Arnie Oss	F	-	-	-	-	-
George Pulliam	D	-	-	-	-	-
Howard Richmond	F	-	-	-	-	-
Bill Riley	C/LW	-	30	23	53	-
Joe Riley	RW	-	22	-	-	-
Bill Taylor	F	-	-	-	-	-
Bob Thayer	D	-	-	-	-	-
Tom Warner		-	-	-	-	-
Total			154			

Note: Only sparse goaltending statistics are available.

== Awards and honors ==
Player	Award	Ref
Joe Riley	NCAA Tournament Most Outstanding Player	
Bill Riley	AHCA First Team All-American	
George Pulliam	AHCA Second Team All-American	
Bill Riley	NCAA All-Tournament First Team	
Joe Riley	NCAA All-Tournament First Team	
Dick Desmond	NCAA All-Tournament Second Team	
