= 1947–48 Michigan Wolverines men's ice hockey season =

Sport season

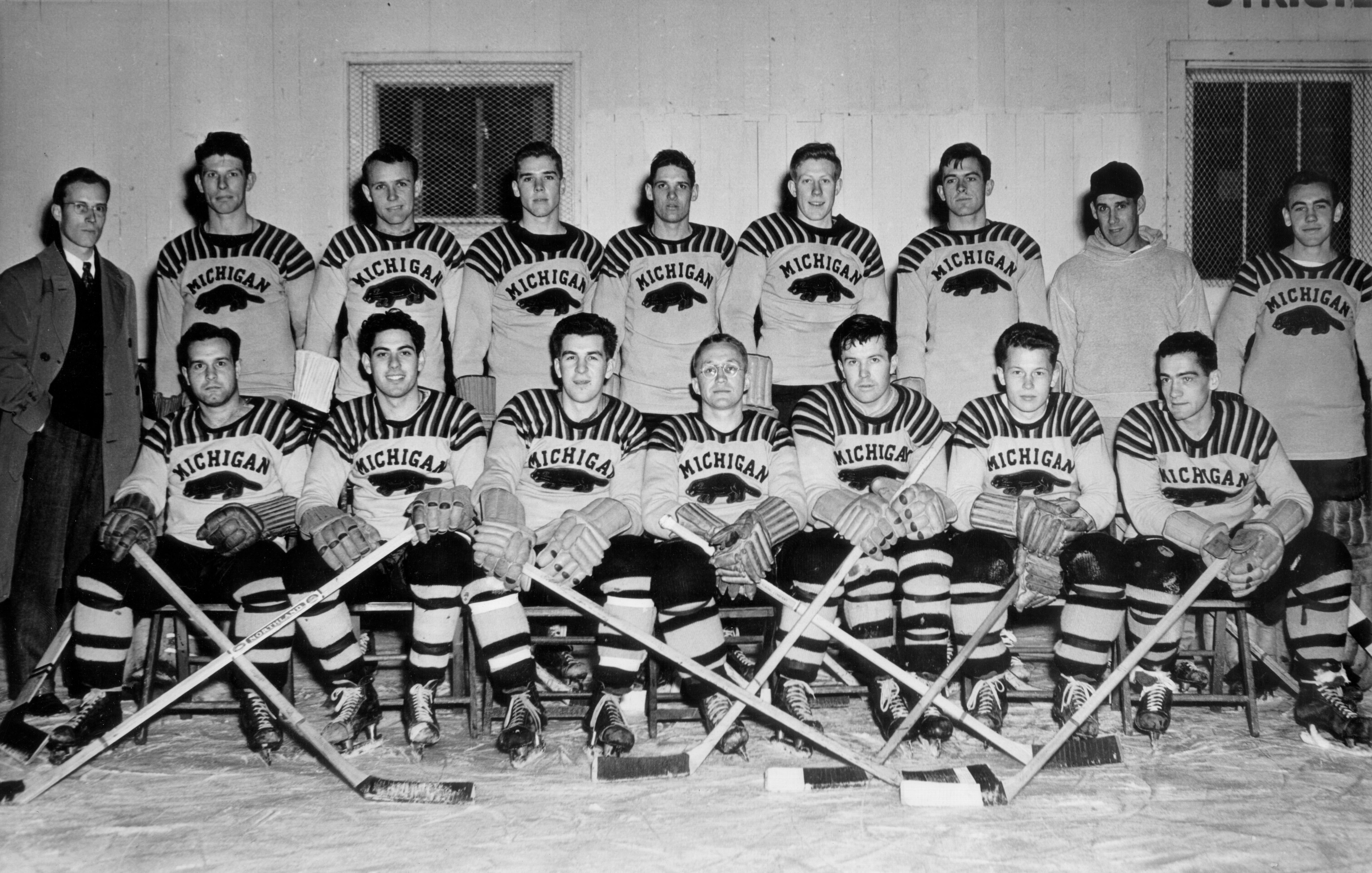

National Champion 1948 NCAA Tournament, Champion
- Home ice: Weinberg Coliseum

Record
- Overall: 20–2–1
- Home: 13–2–1
- Road: 4–0–0
- Neutral: 3–0–0

Coaches and captains
- Head coach: Vic Heyliger
- Captain: Connie Hill

The 1947–48 Michigan Wolverines men's ice hockey team represented the University of Michigan in college ice hockey. In its fourth year under head coach Vic Heyliger, the team compiled a 20–2–1 record, outscored its opponents 141 to 63, and won the first 1948 NCAA Division I Men's Ice Hockey Tournament held in March 1948 at the Broadmoor World Arena in Colorado Springs, Colorado.

Gordon McMillan was the team scoring leader for four consecutive years from 1945 to 1949. During the 1947–48 season, he appeared in 21 games and had career highs in goals (32) and total points (62). In February 1948, McMillan passed his coach, Vic Heyliger (who played at Michigan 1935-37), to become the all-time points leader in Michigan hockey history. Connie Hill, a defenseman from Copper Cliff, Ontario, was the team's captain for the third consecutive year.

== Season overview ==
The 1947–48 Michigan Wolverines men's ice hockey team compiled a 20–2–1 record, outscored its opponents 141 to 63, and won the first NCAA Frozen Four at Colorado Springs, Colorado. In winning the 1948 NCAA Division I Men's Ice Hockey Tournament, the Wolverines went to overtime to defeat Boston College by a 6–4 score in the NCAA Semifinal Game and defeated Dartmouth College 8–4 in the NCAA championship game.

Vic Heyliger was in his fourth year as the Wolverines' head coach. Heyliger coached the team for 13 years from 1944 to 1957, won six national championships, and compiled an overall record of 228–61–13 (.776).

For the third consecutive year, defenseman Connie Hill from Copper Cliff, Ontario, was selected as the team captain. Hill and two other players, forwards Wally Gacek and Wally Grant, were selected as All-American for the 1947–48 season.

Gordon McMillan was the team scoring leader for four consecutive years from 1945 to 1949. During the 1947–48 season, he appeared in 21 games and had career highs in goals (32) and total points (62).

Six members of the 1947–48 Michigan Wolverines men's ice hockey have been inducted into the University of Michigan Athletic Hall of Honor. They are head coach Vic Heyliger (1980), Connie Hill (1985), Al Renfrew (1986), Wally Grant (1987), Gordon McMillan (1992), and Wally Gacek (2007).

== Roster ==
No.	Nat.	Player	Class	Pos	Height	Weight	DoB	Hometown	Previous team	NHL rights
1		John Griffin	Sophomore	D	6' 1" (1.85 m)	190 lb (86 kg)		Scarsdale, New York		—
2		Dick Starrak	Junior	D			1927-05-26	Moose Jaw, Saskatchewan		—
3		Connie Hill (C)	Junior	D	5' 7" (1.7 m)	168 lb (76 kg)	1918-01-15	Copper Cliff, Ontario	Hollywood Wolves (PCHL)	—
4		Leonard Brumm	Sophomore	F				Ironwood, Michigan		—
5		Wally Gacek	Junior	F			1926-06-26	Winnipeg, Manitoba	St. James Canadians (MJHL)	—
6		Owen McArdle	Sophomore	F	5' 11" (1.8 m)	168 lb (76 kg)	1922-09-19	Arlington, Massachusetts		—
7		Gordon McMillan	Junior	F			1927-01-04	Moose Jaw, Saskatchewan	Moose Jaw Monarchs (SAHA)	—
8		Bill Jacobson	Senior	F	5' 10" (1.78 m)	165 lb (75 kg)	1926-04-22	Saskatoon, Saskatchewan	Saskatoon Quakers (NSJHL)	—
9		Al Renfrew	Junior	F			1924-12-21	Toronto, Ontario		—
10		Ted Greer	Senior	F				Wayzata, Minnesota		—
11		Herbert Upton	Senior	D			1925-09-21	Ann Arbor, Michigan		—
12		Paul Milanowski	Sophomore	G	6' 0" (1.83 m)	170 lb (77 kg)		Detroit, Michigan		—
13		Sam Stedman	Junior	F			1926-01-20	Winnipeg, Manitoba	CUAC Blues (MJHL)	—
14		David Ross Smith	Sophomore	D/F			1925-05-14	Toronto, Ontario	De La Salle Oaklands High (CAHS)	—
15		Al Nadeau		F	5' 4" (1.63 m)	161 lb (73 kg)		Marquette, Michigan		—
16		Paul Fontana		F	5' 10" (1.78 m)	150 lb (68 kg)		West Springfield, Massachusetts		—
17		Jack McDonald	Junior	G	6' 1" (1.85 m)	185 lb (84 kg)	1920-04-11	International Falls, Minnesota		—
17		Wally Grant	Sophomore	F	5' 8" (1.73 m)	165 lb (75 kg)	1927-12-08	Leonidas, Minnesota		—
18		Bob Marshall	Junior	D				North Bay, Ontario		—
		Bill Pritula	Senior	D	6' 0" (1.83 m)	201 lb (91 kg)		Detroit, Michigan		—
		Clem Cossalter	Senior	D				Eveleth, Minnesota	Eveleth-Gilbert High School (MN-HS)	—

== Standings ==
1947–48 NCAA Independent ice hockey standings
	Intercollegiate							Overall					
	GP	W	L	T	Pct.	GF	GA	GP	W	L	T	GF	GA
Army	16	11	4	1	.719	78	39	16	11	4	1	78	39
Bemidji State	5	0	5	0	.000	13	36	10	2	8	0	37	63
Boston College	19	14	5	0	.737	126	60	19	14	5	0	126	60
Boston University	24	20	4	0	.833	179	86	24	20	4	0	179	86
Bowdoin	9	4	5	0	.444	45	68	11	6	5	0	56	73
Brown	14	5	9	0	.357	61	91	14	5	9	0	61	91
California	10	2	8	0	.200	45	67	18	6	12	0	94	106
Clarkson	12	5	6	1	.458	67	39	17	10	6	1	96	54
Colby	8	2	6	0	.250	28	41	8	2	6	0	28	41
Colgate	10	7	3	0	.700	54	34	13	10	3	0	83	45
Colorado College	14	9	5	0	.643	84	73	27	19	8	0	207	120
Cornell	4	0	4	0	.000	3	43	4	0	4	0	3	43
Dartmouth	23	21	2	0	.913	156	76	24	21	3	0	156	81
Fort Devens State	13	3	10	0	.231	33	74	–	–	–	–	–	–
Georgetown	3	2	1	0	.667	12	11	7	5	2	0	37	21
Hamilton	–	–	–	–	–	–	–	14	7	7	0	–	–
Harvard	22	9	13	0	.409	131	131	23	9	14	0	135	140
Lehigh	9	0	9	0	.000	10	100	11	0	11	0	14	113
Massachusetts	2	0	2	0	.000	1	23	3	0	3	0	3	30
Michigan	18	16	2	0	.889	105	53	23	20	2	1	141	63
Michigan Tech	19	7	12	0	.368	87	96	20	8	12	0	91	97
Middlebury	14	8	5	1	.607	111	68	16	10	5	1	127	74
Minnesota	16	9	7	0	.563	78	73	21	9	12	0	100	105
Minnesota–Duluth	6	3	3	0	.500	21	24	9	6	3	0	36	28
MIT	19	8	11	0	.421	93	114	19	8	11	0	93	114
New Hampshire	13	4	9	0	.308	58	67	13	4	9	0	58	67
North Dakota	10	6	4	0	.600	51	46	16	11	5	0	103	68
North Dakota Agricultural	8	5	3	0	.571	43	33	8	5	3	0	43	33
Northeastern	19	10	9	0	.526	135	119	19	10	9	0	135	119
Norwich	9	3	6	0	.333	38	58	13	6	7	0	56	70
Princeton	18	8	10	0	.444	65	72	21	10	11	0	79	79
St. Cloud State	12	10	2	0	.833	55	35	16	12	4	0	73	55
St. Lawrence	9	6	3	0	.667	65	27	13	8	4	1	95	50
Suffolk	–	–	–	–	–	–	–	–	–	–	–	–	–
Tufts	4	3	1	0	.750	17	15	4	3	1	0	17	15
Union	9	1	8	0	.111	7	86	9	1	8	0	7	86
Williams	11	3	6	2	.364	37	47	13	4	7	2	–	–
Yale	16	5	10	1	.344	60	69	20	8	11	1	89	85

== Schedule ==
Date	Opponent	Site	Decision	Result	Record
Regular season
December 6	vs. McMaster*	Weinberg Coliseum • Ann Arbor, Michigan	McDonald	W 13–1	1–0
December 12	vs. Windsor Spitfires*	Weinberg Coliseum • Ann Arbor, Michigan	McDonald	W 4–3	2–0
December 18	vs. Toronto*	Chicago Stadium • Chicago, Illinois	McDonald	W 3–2	3–0
December 19	vs. Toronto*	Weinberg Coliseum • Ann Arbor, Michigan	McDonald	T 4–4	3–0–1
January 9	vs. North Dakota*	Weinberg Coliseum • Ann Arbor, Michigan	McDonald	L 5–6	3–1–1
January 10	vs. North Dakota*	Weinberg Coliseum • Ann Arbor, Michigan	McDonald	W 5–2	4–1–1
January 16	at Minnesota*	Minneapolis Arena • Minneapolis, Minnesota	McDonald	W 3–2	5–1–1
January 17	at Minnesota*	Minneapolis Arena • Minneapolis, Minnesota	McDonald	W 5–1	6–1–1
January 31	at Michigan Tech*	Dee Stadium • Houghton, Michigan	McDonald	W 9–8	7–1–1
February 2	at Michigan Tech*	Dee Stadium • Houghton, Michigan	McDonald	W 4–0	8–1–1
February 6	vs. Yale*	Weinberg Coliseum • Ann Arbor, Michigan	McDonald	W 6–1	9–1–1
February 7	vs. Yale*	Weinberg Coliseum • Ann Arbor, Michigan	McDonald	W 7–3	10–1–1
February 13	vs. Minnesota*	Weinberg Coliseum • Ann Arbor, Michigan	McDonald	W 6–2	11–1–1
February 14	vs. Minnesota*	Weinberg Coliseum • Ann Arbor, Michigan	McDonald	L 4–5 ^{OT}	11–2–1
February 16	vs. California*	Weinberg Coliseum • Ann Arbor, Michigan	McDonald	W 11–2	12–2–1
February 17	vs. California*	Weinberg Coliseum • Ann Arbor, Michigan	McDonald	W 4–2	13–2–1
February 21	vs. Western Ontario*	Weinberg Coliseum • Ann Arbor, Michigan	McDonald	W 12–0	14–2–1
February 27	vs. Colorado College*	Weinberg Coliseum • Ann Arbor, Michigan	McDonald	W 3–1	15–2–1
February 28	vs. Colorado College*	Weinberg Coliseum • Ann Arbor, Michigan	McDonald	W 6–1	16–2–1
March 5	vs. Michigan Tech*	Weinberg Coliseum • Ann Arbor, Michigan	McDonald	W 6–5	17–2–1
March 6	vs. Michigan Tech*	Weinberg Coliseum • Ann Arbor, Michigan	McDonald	W 7–4	18–2–1
NCAA Tournament
March 19	vs. Boston College*	Broadmoor Arena • Colorado Springs, Colorado (National Semifinal)	McDonald	W 6–4 ^{OT}	19–2–1
March 20	vs. Dartmouth*	Broadmoor Arena • Colorado Springs, Colorado (National Championship)	McDonald	W 8–4	20–2–1
*Non-conference game. Source:

== Scoring Statistics ==
Fourteen players received varsity letters for their participation on the 1947–48 Michigan hockey team. Those players are the 12 who are credited with having played in a game as well as Clem Cossalter and Bill Jacobson. Brook Hill Snow received the Manager's Award. John T. Griffin and Paul Milanowski received secondary awards.

Name	Position	Games	Goals	Assists	Points	PIM
Gordon McMillan	C	23	32	30	62	20
Wally Gacek	C	23	27	26	53	8
Al Renfrew	LW	23	26	21	47	14
Wally Grant	RW	15	10	15	25	13
Connie Hill	D	23	9	13	22	47
Owen McArdle	C	20	3	4	7	4
Leonard Brumm	RW	21	3	3	6	8
Sam Stedman	F	13	3	1	4	8
David Ross Smith	D	20	0	4	4	47
Dick Starrak	D	23	1	1	2	30
Jack McDonald	G	23	0	0	0	0
Ted Greer	F	23				
Clem Cossalter	D					
Paul Fontana	F					
John Griffin	D					
Bill Jacobson	F					
Bob Marshall	D					
Paul Milanowski	G					
Al Nadeau	F					
Bill Pritula	D					
Herb Upton	F/D					
Total			141			

== Game summaries ==
=== Regular season ===
==== Detroit Red Wings: Nov. 28, 1947 ====
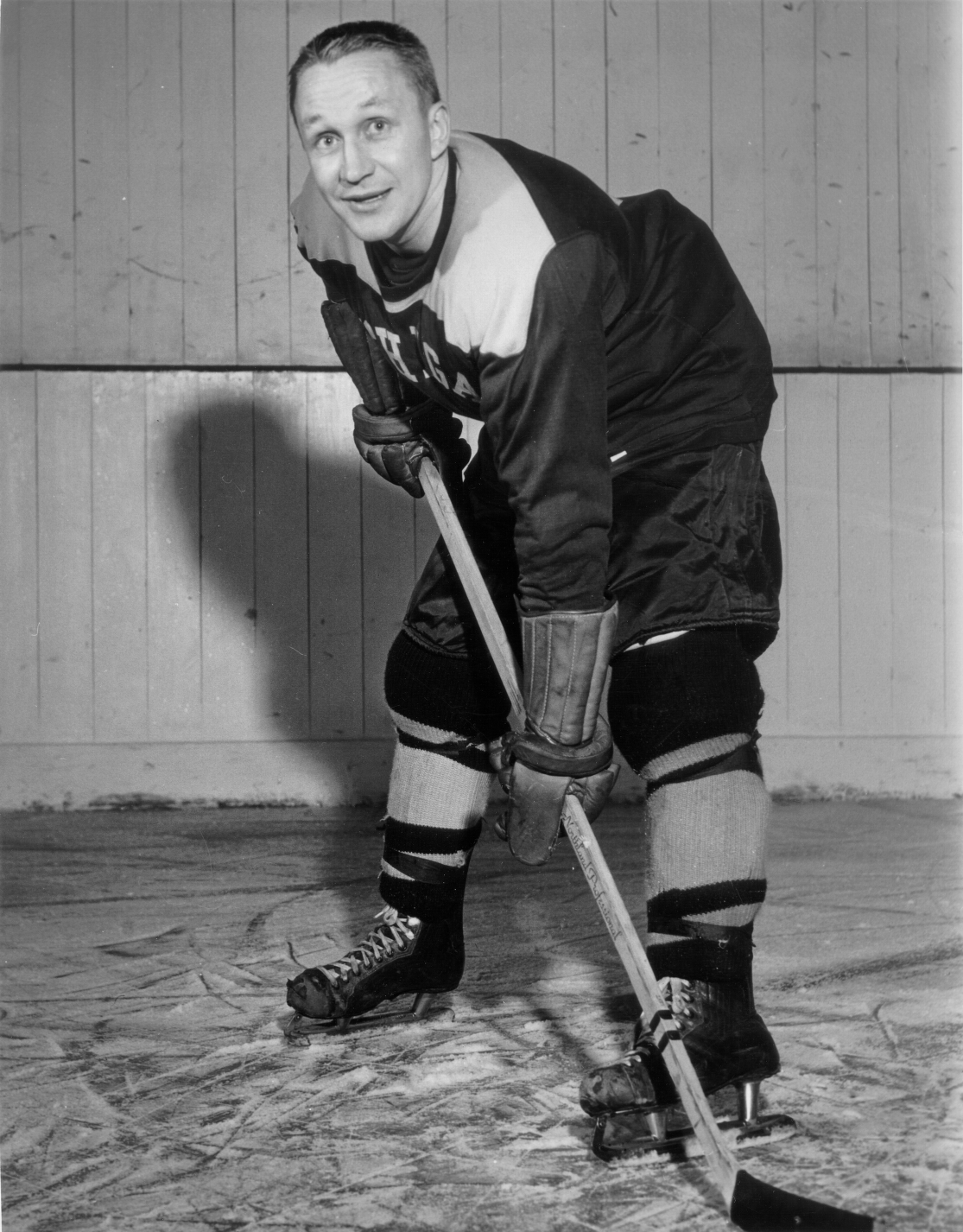
Team captain Connie Hill from Copper Cliff, Ontario

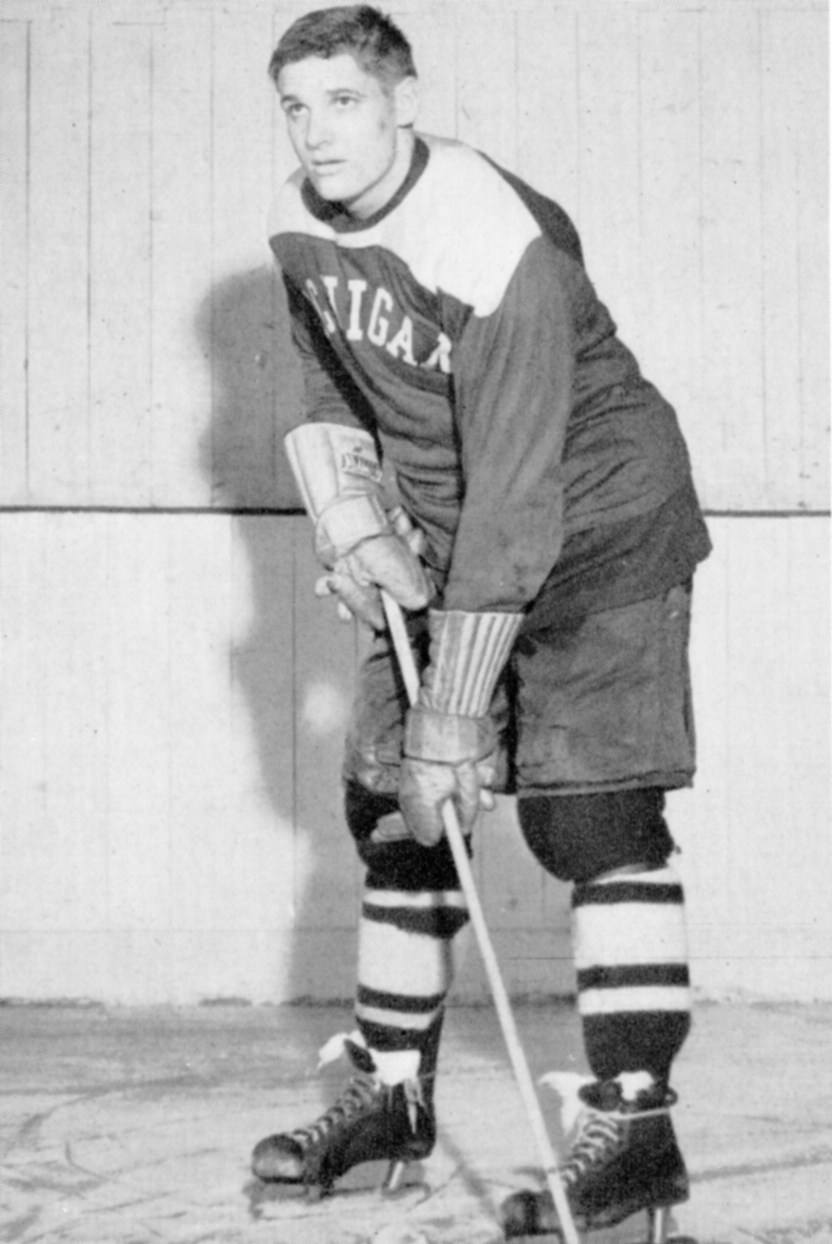
Forward Al Renfrew coached the team from 1957-1973.

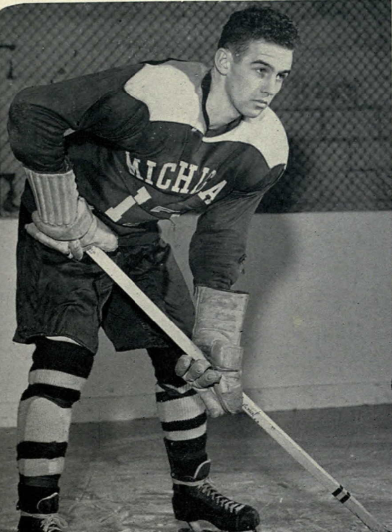
Forward Wally Grant from Eveleth, Minnesota

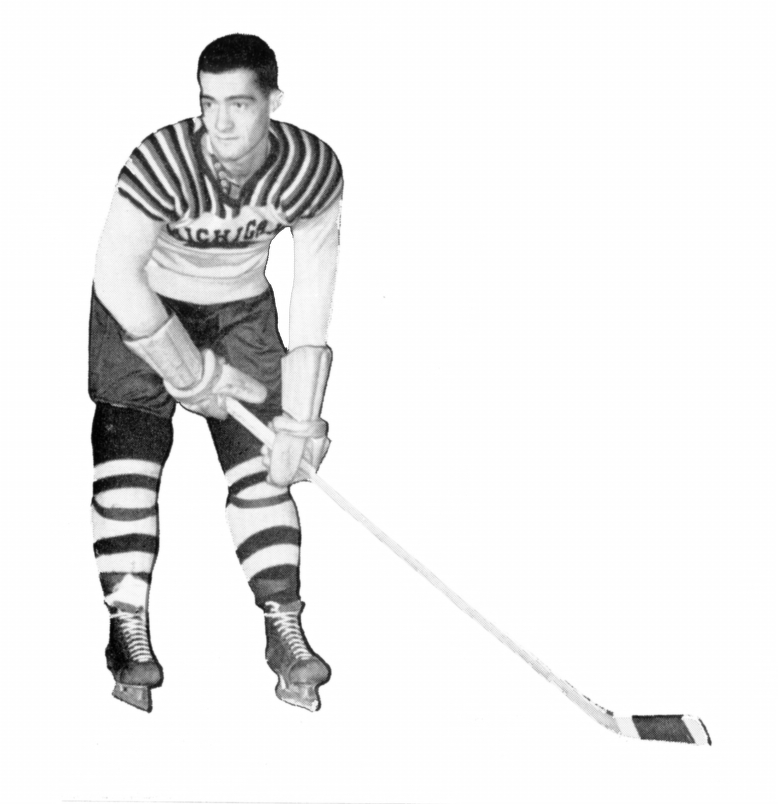
Defenseman Ross Smith

On November 28, 1947, Michigan played an exhibition contest against the Detroit Red Wings at the Coliseum in Ann Arbor, Michigan. The contest the second annual meeting between the teams arranged between Michigan coach Vic Heyliger and Detroit manager Jack Adams. The Wolverines won the game 9–7 in front of a capacity crowd of 1,300 spectators. Wally Gacek scored two goals for the Wolverines. Sid Abel of Detroit scored three goals in the game.

As the game was for exhibition purposes only, Michigan and Detroit players switched sides throughout the game. The Michigan Alumnus noted: "A wholesale interchange of players between the two squads made the final outcome meaningless, but the Wolverines performed creditably against the pros and added a couple of valuable chapters to their book of experiences."

After the game, Red Wings manager Jack Adams praised the Wolverines: "The team is very much improved over last year's squad, and I was especially impressed with the fine defensive work of Ross Smith and Bob Marshall. The offensive lines were good and Bill Jacobson certainly proved himself a very able college player."

==== McMaster: Dec. 6, 1947 ====
On December 6, 1947, Michigan opened its regular season with a 13–1 victory over McMaster University (Hamilton, Ontario) in front of a capacity crowd of 1,300 at the Coliseum in Ann Arbor. The Wolverines had established a hockey rivalry with McMasters dating back to 1936. In eight games from 1936 to 1946, Michigan had compiled a record of 5–1–2. The Wolverines set a school record in the game by scoring three goals, two of them by Ted Greer, in the span of 95 seconds. Greer and Gordon McMillan each tallied three goals for hat tricks in the game. Wally Gacek also scored twice.

==== Windsor Spitfires: Dec. 12, 1947 ====
On December 12, 1947, the Wolverines defeated the Windsor Spitfires by a 4–3 score in front of a third consecutive capacity crowd of 1,300 at the Coliseum in Ann Arbor. The Spitfires were a farm club of the Detroit Red Wings. On a pass from Connie Hill, Gordon McMillan broke a 3–3 tie and scored the winning goal with 26 second remaining in the game. McMillan also had three assists in the game. Al Renfrew scored two goals.

After watching the Wolverines defeat the Spitfires, two Red Wings players praised the Wolverines. Gordie Howe noted: "[Michigan forward] Bill Jacobson and I used to play hockey together when we were kids back in Saskatoon (Sask.). I used to look up to him and I watched him carefully in hopes of learning a few tricks." Ted Lindsay added: "This Michigan team is a rough bunch. I don't think I could last much more than a year in this league, especially if I kept getting hit by a boy of Bob Marshall's size."

==== Toronto: Dec. 18-19, 1947 ====
On Thursday, December 18, 1947, the Wolverines defeated the team from the University of Toronto by a 3–2 score in a charity game played at Chicago Stadium to raise funds for the Mercy Hospital to be built in Chicago. Michigan and Toronto had played nine prior games dating back to 1937. The Toronto Blues had won all nine of the previous games. Al Renfrew scored the first goal of the game at the 7:03 mark after stealing the puck at Michigan's blue line and outracing a Toronto defender. Michigan's second goal came on a long pass from Connie Hill to Bill Jacobson at center ice. Jacobson passed to Ted Greer who shot the puck past the Toronto goalie at the 11:50 mark. Wally Gacek scored Michigan's final goal at 4:11 of the second period. Neither team scored in the third period.

On Friday, December 19, 1947, Michigan and Toronto played to a 4–4 tie in front of the fourth consecutive capacity crowd of 1,300 at the Michigan Coliseum in Ann Arbor.

After the first four games of the season, the Wolverines were undefeated. Gordon McMillan was the team's scoring leader with five goals, seven assists, and 12 points. Al Renfrew was second with five goals, three assists, and eight points. Ted Greer was third with five goals, one assist, and six points.

==== North Dakota: Jan. 9-10, 1948 ====
On Thursday, January 9, 1948, Michigan lost its first game of the season, falling to North Dakota by a 6–5 score before the fifth consecutive capacity crowd of 1,300 at the Coliseum in Ann Arbor. Michigan scored first at the 5:59 mark of the first period on a goal by Connie Hill with assists by Bill Greer and Ted Jacobson. In the second period, Wally Gacek scored an unassisted goal at the 2:56 mark, and Hill scored his second goal (unassisted) at the 4:59 mark. Gordon McMillan scored at the 18:32 mark, and Michigan led 4–3 at the end of the second period. Gacek scored again in the third period (assist from McMillan), but North Dakota scored three times in the period. John Noah scored the winning goal for North Dakota at the 19:19 mark of the third period.

On Friday, January 10, 1948, Michigan defeated North Dakota 5–2 front of the sixth consecutive capacity crowd of 1,300 at the Coliseum in Ann Arbor. Michigan took a 3–1 lead in the first period. Al Renfrew scored the Wolverines' first goal (assist by Hill) at 4:12 of the first period. Bob Marshall added a goal (assist by Bill Jacobson) at 11:07, and Gordon McMillan added a goal (assist by Wally Gacek) at 17:57. Ted Greer added a goal in the second period (assist by Jacobson) and another in the third period (assists by Marshall and Renfrew).

==== At Minnesota: Jan. 16-17, 1948 ====
On January 16 and 17, 1948, the team travelled to Minneapolis for a two-game, Friday and Saturday series against Minnesota. The Wolverines swept the series, winning on Friday night by a 3–2 score and winning the Saturday game 5–1. The Wolverines had not defeated the Golden Gophers twice on Minnesota home ice since 1931. In the Friday game, Gordon McMillan scored the first goal after back-flipping a pass from Connie Hill. Al Renfrew scored Michigan's second goal (assist from McMillan), and McMillan scored the third (assist from Wally Gacek).

In the Saturday night game, the Wolverins scored four goals in the second period and one in the third period. Gordon McMillan scored three goals for a hat trick and added an assist for a total of seven points in the two-game series. Gacek had a goal and two assists in the Saturday night game, and Ted Greer also scored a goal.

==== At Michigan Tech.: Jan. 31/Feb. 2, 1948 ====
On January 31 and February 2, 1948, Michigan played a two-game series against Michigan Tech in Houghton, Michigan. The Wolverines swept the series, winning the Saturday game, 9–8, and the Monday game, 4–0. In the Monday game, Michigan scored twice in the second period and two more times in the third period. An Associated Press report stated that the Wolverines "clicked smoothly" in sweeping the two-game series.

Gordon McMillan broke Vic Heyliger's career scoring record in the series against Michigan Tech. Heyliger totaled 116 points in his Michigan hockey career from 1935 to 1937. By the conclusion of the Yale series the following week, McMillan's career total stood at 127 points.

==== Yale: Feb. 6-7, 1948 ====
On February 6 and 7, 1948, the Wolverines swept a two-game, Friday and Saturday series against Yale at the Coliseum in Ann Arbor. Michigan won the Friday night game, 6–1, and the Saturday game, 7–3. Al Renfrew scored a goal in the first game that gave him his 100th career point with Michigan. He joined Gordon McMillan and Vic Heyliger as the third 100-point man in Michigan hockey history. Michigan's defense limited Yale to four shots on goal in the game, and Yale's lone goal came at 17:29 of the third period.

==== Minnesota: Feb. 13-14, 1948 ====
On February 13 and 14, 1948, the Wolverines split a two-game, Friday and Saturday series with Minnesota. The Wolverines won the Friday night game, 6–2, but suffered their second loss of the season on Saturday, losing to the Golden Gophers by a 5–4 score.

==== California: Feb. 16-17, 1948 ====
On February 16 and 17, 1948, the Wolverines played a two-game series against the University of California on a Monday and Tuesday night at the Coliseum in Ann Arbor. The Wolverines won the first game, 11–2, and the second game, 4–2.

==== Western Ontario: Feb. 21, 1948 ====
On Saturday, February 21, 1948, Michigan defeated Western Ontario by a 12–0 score at the Coliseum in Ann Arbor.

==== Colorado College: Feb. 27-28, 1948 ====
On February 27 and 28, 1948, Michigan swept a two-game, Friday and Saturday series against Colorado College at the Coliseum in Ann Arbor. Michigan won the Friday night game, 3–1, and the Saturday game, 6–1.

==== Michigan Tech.: March 5–6, 1948 ====
On March 5 and 6, 1948, Michigan swept a two-game, Friday and Saturday series against Michigan Tech at the Coliseum in Ann Arbor. Michigan won the Friday night game, 6–5, and the Saturday game, 7–4. With the victories, Michigan closed out its regular season with a record of 20–2–1.

=== Frozen Four ===
==== Semifinal vs. Boston College ====
On March 19, 1948, Michigan defeated Boston College in overtime by a score of 6–4 in the semifinal game of the first NCAA Frozen Four collegiate ice hockey tournament. The game was played in front of a capacity crowd of 2,500 at the Broadmoor Arena in Colorado Springs, Colorado. Boston College took a 3–1 lead in the second period. Halfway through the third period, Michigan took a 4–3 lead. During the final minute of the third period, Boston College pulled its goalie, and Jim Fitzgerald scored to send the game to overtime. Only 18 seconds into the overtime period, Wally Gacek scored on a pass from Wally Grant. Gacek scored again with less than 30 seconds left in the overtime period. Boston College had pulled its goalie, and Gacek shot the puck into the net from behind the Michigan blue line. Connie Hill of Michigan scored three goals for a hat trick in the game.

==== Championship vs. Dartmouth ====
On March 20, 1947, Michigan defeated Dartmouth College in the championship game by a score of 8–4. After eleven minutes of play in the second period, Dartmouth led 4–2. The Wolverines held Dartmouth scoreless for the final 29 minutes while adding six goals on offense. At the end of the second period, the Wolverines appeared to have scored the tying goal, but the referee disallowed the goal on the ground that an official in the penalty box had blown his whistle before the goal. The NCAA rules committee overruled the decision during the intermission, and Michigan opened the third period in a 4–4 tie. Michigan scored three times in the opening six minutes of the third period on goals by Wally Gacek, Wally Grant, and Ted Greer. Gacek scored three goals and had three assists in the game.

==== All-Tournament Team ====
Wally Grant and Connie Hill were selected for the Associated Press All-Tournament team.

== Awards and honors ==
Player	Award	Ref
Ross Smith	AHCA First Team All-American	
Connie Hill	AHCA Second Team All-American	
Wally Gacek	AHCA Second Team All-American	
Connie Hill	NCAA All-Tournament First Team	
Wally Grant	NCAA All-Tournament First Team	
Ross Smith	NCAA All-Tournament Second Team	
Wally Gacek	NCAA All-Tournament Second Team	

== See also ==
- 1948 NCAA Division I Men's Ice Hockey Tournament
- List of NCAA Division I Men's Ice Hockey Tournament champions
