= List of NCAA Division I men's ice hockey seasons =

This is a list of seasons and results of collegiate ice hockey seasons since the inception of the NCAA tournament in 1947.

== Tournament play begins ==
Though U.S. colleges had been fielding men's ice hockey teams since 1894, the NCAA did not have a formal tournament in place to decide a champion until after World War II. Starting with the 1947–48 season, the NCAA tournament invited the four top-ranked teams to Colorado Springs, Colorado to compete for the NCAA Championship.

No.	Season	Tournament	No. of teams in tournament	Start	Finish	NCAA champion (number)	Champion conference	Champion record	Championship site
1	1947–48	1948	4 (Note: Tournament play began with four independent Division I teams invited to participate. No formal conferences existed at this time.)		March 20	Michigan	None	(20–2–1)	Colorado Springs, Colorado
2	1948–49	1949	4 (Note: A third-place game was instituted.)		March 19	Boston College	None	(21–1–0)	Colorado Springs, Colorado
3	1949–50	1950	4		March 18	Colorado College	None	(18–5–1)	Colorado Springs, Colorado
4	1950–51	1951	4 (Note: Ice hockey conferences begin to form, beginning with the Tri-State League and followed the next year by the Midwest Collegiate Hockey League (precursor to the WCHA).)		March 17	Michigan (2)	None	(22–4–1)	Colorado Springs, Colorado
5	1951–52	1952	4		March 15	Michigan (3)	MCHL	(22–4–0)	Colorado Springs, Colorado
6	1952–53	1953	4		March 14	Michigan (4)	MCHL	(22–4–0)	Colorado Springs, Colorado
7	1953–54	1954	4		March 13	Rensselaer	Tri-State League	(18–5–0)	Colorado Springs, Colorado
8	1954–55	1955	4		March 12	Michigan (5)	WIHL	(18–5–1)	Colorado Springs, Colorado
9	1955–56	1956	4		March 17	Michigan (6)	WIHL	(20–2–1)	Colorado Springs, Colorado
10	1956–57	1957	4		March 16	Colorado College (2)	WIHL	(25–5–0)	Colorado Springs, Colorado

== Rotating tournaments ==
After spending 10 years at one location, the NCAA began to move the Division I ice hockey tournament to different sites. Over the next 14 years, the tournament was held in 11 different venues and, more importantly to the northeast teams, was held in New England eight times. While the rotations stopped briefly in 1972, they resumed after 1974, and the tournament has not been held in the same city for consecutive years since.

No.	Season	Tournament	No. of teams in tournament	Start	Finish	NCAA champion (number)	Champion conference	Champion record	Championship site
11	1957–58	1958	4		March 15	Denver	WIHL	(25–10–2)	Minneapolis, Minnesota
12	1958–59	1959	4		March 14	North Dakota	None	(20–10–1)	Troy, New York
13	1959–60	1960	4 (Note: Two games were played between eastern teams to determine tournament participants. Neither game is considered as part of the NCAA or ECAC tournaments.)		March 19	Denver (2)	WCHA	(27–4–3)	Boston, Massachusetts
14	1960–61	1961	4		March 18	Denver (3)	WCHA	(30–1–1)	Denver, Colorado
15	1961–62	1962	4		March 17	Michigan Tech	WCHA	(29–3–0)	Utica, New York
16	1962–63	1963	4		March 16	North Dakota (2)	WCHA	(22–7–3)	Chestnut Hill, Massachusetts
17	1963–64	1964	4		March 21	Michigan (7)	WCHA	(24–4–1)	Denver, Colorado
18	1964–65 (Note: ECAC Hockey reorganized its conference membership, dividing the teams into upper- and lower-tiers. The lower tier teams were placed into ECAC 2, creating the first formal divisions for college ice hockey.)	1965	4		March 20	Michigan Tech (2)	WCHA	(24–5–2)	Providence, Rhode Island
19	1965–66	1966	4		March 19	Michigan State	WCHA	(16–13–0)	Minneapolis, Minnesota
20	1966–67	1967	4		March 18	Cornell	ECAC	(27–1–1)	Syracuse, New York
21	1967–68	1968	4		March 16	Denver (4)	WCHA	(28–5–1)	Duluth, Minnesota
22	1968–69	1969	4		March 15	Denver (5)	WCHA	(26–6–0)	Colorado Springs, Colorado
23	1969–70	1970	4		March 21	Cornell (2)	ECAC	(29–0–0) (Note: The 1969–70 Cornell Big Red are thus far the only NCAA Division I men's ice hockey champion to complete a perfect season since tournament play began.)	Lake Placid, New York
24	1970–71	1971	4		March 20	Boston University	ECAC	(28–2–1)	Syracuse, New York
25	1971–72	1972	4		March 18	Boston University (2)	ECAC	(26–4–1)	Boston, Massachusetts
26	1972–73	1973	4 (Note: The University of Denver's participation in the 1973 tournament was later vacated by the NCAA committee on infractions.)		March 17	Wisconsin	WCHA	(29–9–2)	Boston, Massachusetts
27	1973–74 (Note: The NCAA reclassified the divisions from university and college to the current numerical format in the summer of 1973, making 1973–74 the first official Division I season.)	1974	4		March 16	Minnesota	WCHA	(22–11–6)	Boston, Massachusetts
28	1974–75	1975	4		March 15	Michigan Tech (3)	WCHA	(32–10–0)	St. Louis, Missouri
29	1975–76	1976	4		March 27	Minnesota (2)	WCHA	(28–14–2)	Denver, Colorado

== Quarterfinals expansion ==
For the 30th season of the tournament, which had become the de facto possession of the WCHA and ECAC, the NCAA instituted a new rule by which they were able to add up to four additional teams to the tournament if they saw fit. This policy essentially became a vehicle allowing the CCHA champion to play, with the lone exception coming in 1978. For the 1981 tournament, the NCAA altered the rule to guarantee a full quarterfinal round, and started including true 'at large' teams for the first time. Between 1981 and 1987, the quarterfinals consisted of two games, where the team that scored the most goals in the two games would advance to the "Frozen Four". Between 1977 and 1987, Detroit, Michigan and Providence, Rhode Island would each host the tournament four times.

No.	Season	Tournament	No. of teams in tournament	Start	Finish	NCAA champion (number)	Champion conference	Champion record	Championship site
30	1976–77	1977	5		March 26	Wisconsin (2)	WCHA	(37–7–1)	Detroit, Michigan
31	1977–78	1978	6		March 25	Boston University (3)	ECAC	(30–2–0)	Providence, Rhode Island
32	1978–79	1979	5		March 24	Minnesota (3)	WCHA	(32–11–1)	Detroit, Michigan
33	1979–80	1980	5		March 29	North Dakota (3)	WCHA	(31–8–1)	Providence, Rhode Island
34	1980–81	1981	8		March 28	Wisconsin (3)	WCHA	(27–14–1)	Duluth, Minnesota
35	1981–82 (Note: Four teams left the WCHA and joined the more geographically concentrated CCHA: Michigan, Michigan State, Michigan Tech and Notre Dame (Michigan Tech would rejoin the WCHA three years later).)	1982	8		March 27	North Dakota (4)	WCHA	(35–12–0)	Providence, Rhode Island
36	1982–83	1983	8		March 26	Wisconsin (4)	WCHA	(33–10–4)	Grand Forks, North Dakota
37	1983–84	1984	8		March 24	Bowling Green	CCHA	(34–8–2)	Lake Placid, New York
38	1984–85 (Note: Six teams left the ECAC over disagreements about the length of the conference schedule: Boston College, Boston University, Maine, New Hampshire, Northeastern and Providence left to form the Hockey East conference in 1984 and were joined by Division II Lowell (now known as UMass Lowell).)	1985	8		March 30	Rensselaer (2)	ECAC	(35–2–1)	Detroit, Michigan
39	1985–86	1986	8		March 29	Michigan State (2)	CCHA	(34–9–2)	Providence, Rhode Island
40	1986–87	1987	8		March 28	North Dakota (5)	WCHA	(40–8–0)	Detroit, Michigan

== Additional expansion ==
With four major conferences and a myriad of independent programs competing at the Division I level, the tournament was expanded to 12 teams beginning with the 1987–88 season. The first round followed the same pattern as the quarterfinals, with teams playing two games against a single opponent, and the one with a higher goal total after the series advancing. The rest of the tournament retained the earlier format. One year later, the goal-total format was abandoned and replaced by a best-of-three series for the opening round and quarterfinals. In 1992, the entire tournament was switched to a single-elimination format and divided into two regional locations that would feed into the "Frozen Four". For the first time, in 1999, the championship was held in a region without a local Division I program when the championship round was awarded to Anaheim, California.

No.	Season	Tournament	No. of teams in tournament	Start	Finish	NCAA champion (number)	Champion conference	Champion record	Championship site
41	1987–88	1988	12		April 2	Lake Superior State	CCHA	(33–7–6)	Lake Placid, New York
42	1988–89	1989	12		April 1	Harvard	ECAC	(31–3–0)	St. Paul, Minnesota
43	1989–90	1990	12 (Note: The third-place game was discontinued.)		April 1	Wisconsin (5)	WCHA	(36–9–1)	Detroit, Michigan
44	1990–91	1991	12		March 30	Northern Michigan	WCHA	(38–5–4)	St. Paul, Minnesota
45	1991–92	1992	12 (Note: The University of Wisconsin's participation in the 1992 tournament was later vacated by the NCAA Committee on Infractions.)		April 4	Lake Superior State (2)	CCHA	(30–9–4)	Albany, New York
46	1992–93	1993	12		April 3	Maine	Hockey East	(42–1–2)	Milwaukee, Wisconsin
47	1993–94	1994	12		April 2	Lake Superior State (3)	CCHA	(31–10–4)	St. Paul, Minnesota
48	1994–95	1995	12		April 1	Boston University (4)	Hockey East	(31–6–3)	Providence, Rhode Island
49	1995–96	1996	12		March 30	Michigan (8)	CCHA	(34–7–2)	Cincinnati, Ohio
50	1996–97	1997	12		March 29	North Dakota (6)	WCHA	(31–10–2)	Milwaukee, Wisconsin
51	1997–98	1998	12		April 4	Michigan (9)	CCHA	(34–11–1)	Boston, Massachusetts
52	1998–99	1999	12	October 3	April 3	Maine (2)	Hockey East	(31–6–4)	Anaheim, California
53	1999–00	2000	12	October 1	April 8	North Dakota (7)	WCHA	(31–8–5)	Providence, Rhode Island
54	2000–01	2001	12	October 6	April 7	Boston College (2)	Hockey East	(33–8–2)	Albany, New York
55	2001–02	2002	12	October 5	April 6	Minnesota (4)	WCHA	(32–8–4)	St. Paul, Minnesota

== Further expansion and commercialization ==
After the addition of two more conferences around the turn of the century (MAAC and CHA, neither of which now sponsors men's hockey), bringing the total number to six, and with each receiving an at-large bid starting in 2001 and 2003 respectively, the tournament was again expanded by four teams. Two additional regional groups were added (Northeast and Midwest), and byes into the quarterfinals were eliminated. Additionally, the "Frozen Four" was seen as a vehicle to increase both revenue and the popularity of college hockey, and as such, the apex of the tournament began to move around to non-traditional college hockey areas, usually in the buildings of NHL teams.

The first decade of the 21st century saw significant changes to hockey's conference landscape. After the 2002–03 season, the MAAC hockey programs split from the league to form the Atlantic Hockey Association. CHA stopped sponsoring men's hockey after the 2009–10 season, but continued to operate as a women's league through the 2023–24 season.

No.	Season	Tournament	No. of teams in tournament	Start	Finish	NCAA champion (number)	Champion conference	Champion record	Championship site
56	2002–03	2003	16	October 4	April 12	Minnesota (5)	WCHA	(28–8–9)	Buffalo, New York
57	2003–04	2004	16 (Note: The MAAC's hockey programs broke away to form Atlantic Hockey.)	October 3	April 10	Denver (6)	WCHA	(27–12–5)	Boston, Massachusetts
58	2004–05	2005	16	October 3	April 9	Denver (7)	WCHA	(32–9–2)	Columbus, Ohio
59	2005–06	2006	16	October 7	April 8	Wisconsin (6)	WCHA	(30–10–3)	Milwaukee, Wisconsin
60	2006–07	2007	16	October 6	April 7	Michigan State (3)	CCHA	(26–13–3)	St. Louis, Missouri
61	2007–08	2008	16	October 7	April 12	Boston College (3)	Hockey East	(25–11–8)	Denver, Colorado
62	2008–09	2009	16	October 10	April 11	Boston University (5)	Hockey East	(35–6–4)	Washington, D.C.
63	2009–10	2010	16	October 8	April 10	Boston College (4)	Hockey East	(29–10–3)	Detroit, Michigan (Note: The Frozen Four was held at Ford Field in Detroit. This was the first championship in NCAA ice hockey history held at a venue designed for field sports.)
64	2010–11	2011	16 (Note: College Hockey America ceased sponsoring men's hockey after all of its four remaining programs either joined other conferences or went independent. The conference remains in operation to this day as a women's-only league.)	October 2	April 9	Minnesota–Duluth	WCHA	(26–10–6)	St. Paul, Minnesota
65	2011–12	2012	16	October 1	April 7	Boston College (5)	Hockey East	(33–10–1)	Tampa, Florida
66	2012–13	2013	16	October 6	April 13	Yale	ECAC	(22–12–3)	Pittsburgh, Pennsylvania

== Conference realignment, dissolution, and mergers ==
In 2010, Terry Pegula, an alumnus of Pennsylvania State University, donated $102 million to his alma mater for the express purpose of building a brand-new hockey arena and funding the upgrade of both the men's and women's ice hockey programs from club level to Division I.

This began a chain of events that caused a massive amount of conference realignment, the founding of two new conferences, and the ending of one of the oldest conferences in the NCAA. Penn State's rise to the D-I ranks gave the Big Ten its sixth university that sponsored varsity men's ice hockey, a number significant for two reasons. First, Big Ten bylaws dictate that the conference can only sponsor a sport if it has at least six participating members. More significantly, NCAA rules on conference formation dictate that at least six teams must be present for a conference to receive an automatic bid into the NCAA tournament. In short order, the other five teams announced their intention to leave their conferences (WCHA and CCHA). In response, several members of the WCHA, including traditional powerhouses Denver and North Dakota, split to form a new conference, the NCHC. The NCHC quickly grew to eight member teams, leaving the WCHA with only four remaining schools and the CCHA with six. Five of the remaining CCHA schools then joined the WCHA, along with the Independent Alabama-Huntsville, bringing the WCHA up to 10 member schools. The remaining CCHA team, Notre Dame, joined Hockey East. In essence, all of the universities that changed conferences were not significantly harmed by the upheaval, because no team was left without a conference by the start of the 2013–14 season. However, the shift did create one more automatic qualifier for the tournament, reducing the chance to receive an at-large bid for all schools across the nation.

In November 2019, the seven Midwestern schools among the 10 members of the men's WCHA jointly announced they would leave the league after the 2020–21 season, citing the league's extended geographic footprint as a reason for this move. On February 18, 2020, these seven schools announced they would start play in a new CCHA in the 2021–22 season. In July of that year, the revived CCHA announced that St. Thomas, which had just received NCAA approval to move directly from Division III to Division I starting in July 2021, would join the league upon its arrival in D-I.

The 2020 tournament was canceled on March 12, 2020, just before the start of most conference postseason tournaments, due to concerns about the COVID-19 pandemic.

After the 2023–24 season, the Atlantic Hockey Association merged with the women's College Hockey America to form Atlantic Hockey America. The predecessor conferences had operated with a single commissioner and office staff since 2010.

No.	Season	Tournament	No. of teams in tournament	Start	Finish	NCAA champion (number)	Champion conference	Champion record	Championship site
67	2013–14	2014	16 (Note: Major conference realignment shook the Division I men's hockey landscape, with the following changes: The Big Ten became the first Division I all-sports conference to sponsor men's ice hockey since the MAAC ceased sponsorship of the sport in 2003. Before 2013–14, the six Big Ten hockey schools consisted of three WCHA members, two CCHA members, and one independent.; Five WCHA members and one CCHA member announced in 2011 that they would form the National Collegiate Hockey Conference, with play to start in 2013–14. Several months after the NCHC was formed, two more schools joined, one from the CCHA and one from the WCHA.; The original CCHA folded at the end of the 2012–13 season. In addition to the previously mentioned conference moves, one school (Notre Dame) joined Hockey East (becoming that conference's first non-New England member) and five either joined or rejoined the WCHA.; In addition to the five former CCHA members, the WCHA added former independent Alabama–Huntsville.)	October 4	April 12	Union	ECAC Hockey	(30–6–4)	Philadelphia, Pennsylvania
68	2014–15	2015	16	October 4	April 13	Providence	Hockey East	(26–13–2)	Boston, Massachusetts
69	2015–16	2016	16	October 3	April 9	North Dakota (8)	NCHC	(34–6–4)	Tampa, Florida
70	2016–17	2017	16	October 1	April 8	Denver (8)	NCHC	(33–7–4)	Chicago, Illinois
71	2017–18	2018	16	October 1	April 7	Minnesota–Duluth (2)	NCHC	(25–16–3)	St. Paul, Minnesota
72	2018–19	2019	16	October 6	April 13	Minnesota–Duluth (3)	NCHC	(29–11–2)	Buffalo, New York
73	2019–20	2020	Tournament canceled due to COVID-19 pandemic						Detroit, Michigan
74	2020–21	2021	16	November 14	April 10	Massachusetts	Hockey East	(20–5–4)	Pittsburgh, Pennsylvania
75	2021–22	2022	16	October 2	April 9	Denver (9)	NCHC	(31–9–1)	Boston, Massachusetts
76	2022–23	2023	16	October 1	April 8	Quinnipiac	ECAC Hockey	(34–4–3)	Tampa, Florida
77	2023–24	2024	16	October 6	April 14	Denver (10)	NCHC	(30–9–3)	Saint Paul, Minnesota
78	2024–25	2025	16	October 4	April 12	Western Michigan	NCHC	(34–7–1)	St. Louis, Missouri
79	2025–26	2026	16	October 3	April 11	Denver (11)	NCHC	(29–11–3)	Las Vegas, Nevada

== NIL and major-junior additions ==
As a result of the Supreme Court decision in NCAA v. Alston (2021), the NCAA was no longer able to forbid student-athletes from receiving financial compensation. After a few years, the NIL (name, image and likeness) policies eventually took shape in a form that allowed school collectives to begin directly paying college athletes. While college hockey was not the main focus of these organizations, they were able to direct funds towards ice hockey players as well. This, combined with the transfer portal that had been instituted in 2022, saw the landscape of college hockey reshaped. Teams that had previously been able to hold on to their players for their entire college careers were now having to re-recruit their rosters every year lest they be picked clean by others with deeper pockets. However, these policies were able to give many players who found themselves trapped behind a log-jam of other student-athletes the ability to easily transfer to new programs where they could find increased playing time.

Due to the relative weakness of the NCAA at this time, the rules that barred Canadian major-junior players from playing college hockey were also challenged when Arizona State recruited Braxton Whitehead for the 2025–26 season. With the NCAA's financial compensation rules in tatters, they could no longer bar CHL players for having received a nominal financial stipend. It took less than two months for the NCAA to remove the long-standing prohibition and allow major-junior players to play college hockey in the United States for the first time since the early 1970s. All of these new regulations gave teams the ability to drastically overhaul their rosters in just one offseason, rather than having to wait for three to four years, which had been the case for college athletics for decades.

== Chronological statistical leaders ==
Since 1947-48, as of 2022

=== Single season points ===
Points	Player	Pos	School	Year set	Years held
62	Gordon McMillan	F	Michigan	1947–48	1
78	Bill Riley	F	Dartmouth	1948–49	1
84	Jack Garrity	F	Boston University	1949–50	5
89	Bill Cleary	F	Harvard	1954–55	4
90	Phil Latreille	C	Middlebury	1958–59	1
96	Phil Latreille	C	Middlebury	1959–60	1
108	Phil Latreille	C	Middlebury	1960–61	24
108	Dave Taylor	RW	Clarkson	1976–77	8
109	Bill Watson	RW	Minnesota−Duluth	1984–85	2
116	Tony Hrkac	C	North Dakota	1986–87	35

=== Career points ===
Points	Player	Pos	School	Year set	Years held
62	Gordon McMillan	F	Michigan	1947–48	1
131	Bill Riley	F	Dartmouth	1948–49	2
196	Gil Burford	RW	Michigan	1950–51	4
218	John Mayasich	C	Minnesota	1953–54	1
298	John Mayasich	C	Minnesota	1954–55	6
346	Phil Latreille	C	Middlebury	1960–61	61

=== Single season goals ===
Goals	Player	Pos	School	Year set	Years held
32	Gordon McMillan	F	Michigan	1947–48	1
37	Bill Riley	F	Dartmouth	1948–49	1
51	Jack Garrity	F	Boston University	1949–50	2
55	Frank Chiarelli	F	Rensselaer	1951–52	7
57	Phil Latreille	C	Middlebury	1958–59	1
77	Phil Latreille	C	Middlebury	1959–60	1
80	Phil Latreille	C	Middlebury	1960–61	61

=== Career goals ===
Goals	Player	Pos	School	Year set	Years held
32	Gordon McMillan	F	Michigan	1947–48	1
67	Bill Riley	F	Dartmouth	1948–49	2
103	Gil Burford	RW	Michigan	1950–51	1
112	Ron Hartwell	RW	Colorado College	1951–52	4
126	Frank Chiarelli	F	Rensselaer	1953–54	1
155	Frank Chiarelli	F	Rensselaer	1954–55	5
170	Phil Latreille	C	Middlebury	1959–60	1
250	Phil Latreille	C	Middlebury	1960–61	61

=== Single season wins† ===
Wins	Player	School	Year set	Years held
20	Jack McDonald	Michigan	1947–48, 1948–49	4
20	Bernie Burke	Boston College	1948–49	3
20	Hal Downes	Michigan	1950–51	1
22	Willard Ikola	Michigan	1951–52	4
22	Jim Mattson	Minnesota	1952–53	3
23	Eddie MacDonald	Clarkson	1955–56	2
24	Rodney Schneck	Denver	1957–58	2
27	George Kirkwood	Denver	1959–60	1
30	George Kirkwood	Denver	1960–61	18
32	Wally Charko	Bowling Green	1978–79	6
33	Rick Kosti	Minnesota–Duluth	1984–85	3
34	Robb Stauber	Minnesota	1987–88	33
34	Marty Turco	Michigan	1995–96	25
38	Dryden McKay	Minnesota State	2021–22	1

† Most individual goaltending statistics were not recorded before 1960.

=== Career wins‡ ===
Wins	Player	School	Year set	Years held
20	Jack McDonald	Michigan	1947–48	1
40	Jack McDonald	Michigan	1948–49	1
50	Jack McDonald	Michigan	1949–50	6
50	Jim Mattson	Minnesota	1953–54	2
65	Bill Sloan	St. Lawrence	1955–56	13
76	Ken Dryden	Cornell	1968–69	4
76	Gerry Powers	Denver	1968–69	4
82	Ron Grahame	Denver	1972–73	15
88	Gary Kruzich	Bowling Green	1987–88	6
111	Steve Shields	Michigan	1993–94	4
127	Marty Turco	Michigan	1997–98	24

‡ prior to 1970 NCAA rules limited players to 3 varsity seasons

=== Single season goals against average* ===
GAA	Player	School	Year set	Years held
1.72	Robert O'Connor	Princeton	1947–48	10
1.27	Bob Peters	North Dakota	1957–58	45
1.20	David LeNeveu	Cornell	2002–03	1
1.19	Jimmy Howard	Maine	2003–04	17
1.17	Yaniv Perets	Quinnipiac	2021–22	1

* At least 1/3 of team's minutes played

=== Career goals against average^ ===
GAA	Player	School	Year set	Years held
2.38	Robert O'Connor	Princeton	1948–49	12
2.20	George Kirkwood	Denver	1960–61	2
1.93	Godfrey Wood	Harvard	1962–63	6
1.59	Ken Dryden	Cornell	1968–69	34
1.29	David LeNeveu	Cornell	2002–03	16

^ Minimum 30 games played

== See also ==
- List of United States collegiate men's ice hockey seasons
- List of NCAA Division I men's ice hockey champions
