= John Kelley (ice hockey) =

American ice hockey coach (1907–1986)

- Kelley cir. 1940

Biographical details
- Born: July 11, 1907; Cambridge, Massachusetts, US
- Died: April 10, 1986 (aged 78); Boston, Massachusetts, US
- Education: Boston College

Playing career
- 1927–1928: Boston College
- Position: Center

Coaching career (HC unless noted)
- 1933–1942: Boston College
- 1946–1972: Boston College

Head coaching record
- Overall: 501–247–15 (.666)
- Tournaments: 4–13 (.235)

Accomplishments and honors

Championships
- 1949 NCAA National championship 8 Beanpot Titles; 8 New England Championships; ECAC playoff title

Awards
- Lester Patrick Trophy (1972); 2× Spencer Penrose Award (1959, 1972)

Records
- First to coach to reach 500 wins

John Andrew "Snooks" Kelley (July 11, 1907 – April 10, 1986) was an American ice hockey coach. Kelley was coach of the Boston College Eagles ice hockey team for 36 years. Kelley won the 1949 NCAA ice hockey title and was the first coach to win 500 games in the NCAA. He was inducted into the United States Hockey Hall of Fame in 1974

== Career ==
Kelley arrived at Boston College in 1925 after attending Boston College High School. He was a two sport athlete for the Eagles, playing both baseball and ice hockey. Kelley finished his collegiate playing career following his graduation in 1930. Kelley's graduation came just after hockey was removed from as a varsity sport due to the Great Depression.

On January 8, 1933, Kelley agreed to coach a group of BC students while he was completing his teaching at Cambridge Latin. The position offered no pay, and forced him to give up playing with the Boston Hockey Club, but it was the beginning of a career that would last until 1972. Kelley's coaching career was put on hold with the outbreak of World War II. In 1942 Kelley joined the United States Navy and remained enlisted until 1946, before returning to coaching.

Just three years after serving with the Navy Kelley lead his Boston College team over Dartmouth and win the NCAA national championship. It would be the first championship won by an Eastern school. The 1949 National Championship was the only one of his career, however he would lead the Eagles back to the title game in 1965. Boston College lost the championship game to Michigan Tech 8–2.

On December 26, 1952 Boston's famous Beanpot Tournament was established. Kelley enjoyed great success in the tournament winning 5 of the first 10. Some have pointed to his success in the Beanpot leading to Kelley gaining his stature as the face of BC hockey. Kelley coached BC to eight Beanpot titles in thirteen years, including three in a row from 1963 to 1965.

In addition to the National Championship and his Beanpot wins Kelley also racked up an impressive amount of accolades including: eight New England Championships, nine appearances in the ECAC Division I playoffs, one ECAC playoff title and nine NCAA Tournament appearances. Kelley won the Spencer Penrose Award as College Hockey's Coach of the Year in 1959 and 1972. His success at BC earned him the nickname "Dean of American College Hockey Coaches".

In a February 23, 1972 game against rival Boston University Kelley earned his 500th win making him the first NCAA Division-I men's hockey coach to reach that mark. For his career Kelley posted a record of 501-243-15 in his 36-year career. His 501 wins would remain a school record until Jerry York, who played for Kelley from 1963 to 1967, passed him in 2014. Kelley spent most of the first 47 years of his adult life on the Heights as either a player or coach.

In 1970 Kelley was inducted into the Boston College Varsity Club Athletic Hall of Fame. Two years later, in 1972, Kelley received the Lester Patrick Trophy for his contribution to hockey in the United States, not only for his accomplishments on the ice but also because he steadfastly refused to recruit players from Canada. Kelley felt recruiting Canadians would deprive Americans of a chance to develop their hockey potential. In 1974 Kelley be inducted in the United States Hockey Hall of Fame.

On April 10, 1986, following a long bout with an illness, John "Snooks" Kelley died. He was 78 years old.

== Head coaching record ==
Record table
Season	Team	Overall	Conference	Standing	Postseason
Boston College Eagles Independent (1932–1942)
1932–33	Boston College	3-2-1			
1933–34	Boston College	2-6-1			
1934–35	Boston College	7-3-0			
1935–36	Boston College	7-4-1			
1936–37	Boston College	8-4-1			
1937–38	Boston College	9-6-0			
1938–39	Boston College	9-7-0			
1939–40	Boston College	12-5-1			
1940–41	Boston College	13-1-0			East Intercollegiate Champion
1941–42	Boston College	12-2-0			
Boston College:		82-40-5			
Boston College Eagles Independent (1946–1961)
1946–47	Boston College	15-3-1			
1947–48	Boston College	14-5-0			NCAA Semifinal
1948–49	Boston College	21-1-0			NCAA national champion
1949–50	Boston College	14-5-0			NCAA consolation game (loss)
1950–51	Boston College	12-8-0			
1951–52	Boston College	17-3-0			
1952–53	Boston College	11-4-1			
1953–54	Boston College	17-4-0			NCAA consolation game (loss)
1954–55	Boston College	13-8-0			
1955–56	Boston College	14-8-0			NCAA consolation game (loss)
1956–57	Boston College	14-7-1			
1957–58	Boston College	9-12-2			
1958–59	Boston College	20-8-0			NCAA consolation game (win)
1959–60	Boston College	15-9-1			
1960–61	Boston College	19-5-1			
Boston College:		225-90-7			
Boston College Eagles (ECAC Hockey) (1961–1972)
1961–62	Boston College	15-13-1	13-11-0	12th	ECAC Quarterfinals
1962–63	Boston College	22-9-0	19-5-0	3rd	NCAA consolation game (loss)
1963–64	Boston College	18-9-1	16-7-1	5th	ECAC Quarterfinals
1964–65	Boston College	24-7-0	15-5-0	2nd	NCAA runner-up
1965–66	Boston College	16-12-0	12-10-0	6th	ECAC Quarterfinals
1966–67	Boston College	20-8-0	14-6-0	3rd	ECAC third-place game (win)
1967–68	Boston College	19-11-1	14-8-1	7th	NCAA consolation game (loss)
1968–69	Boston College	19-7-0	16-5-0	2nd	ECAC Quarterfinals
1969–70	Boston College	16-10-0	14-7-0	6th	ECAC Quarterfinals
1970–71	Boston College	11-15-0	9-12-0	10th	
1971–72	Boston College	14-16-0	10-11-0	10th	
Boston College:		194-117-3	152-87-2		
Total:		501-247-15			
National champion Postseason invitational champion Conference regular season champion Conference regular season and conference tournament champion Division regular season champion Division regular season and conference tournament champion Conference tournament champion

== See also ==
- List of college men's ice hockey coaches with 400 wins

Awards and achievements
Preceded by Harry Cleverly; Cooney Weiland	Spencer Penrose Award; 1958–59; 1971–72	Succeeded by Jack Riley; Len Ceglarski
Preceded by Inaugural	Hobey Baker Legends of College Hockey Award; 1981	Succeeded by Vic Heyliger
