= Ian Watson (ice hockey) =

Canadian ice hockey player

- Born: Calgary, Alberta, Canada
- Position: Goaltender
- Played for: California

Ian Watson Is a former ice hockey goaltender who played for the California Golden Bears before the team lost its varsity status in 1949.

Watson was the starting goaltender beginning in at least 1947–48 and was selected as the best college goaltender for that season. He repeated the performance the following year, but due to the demolition of their home rink in 1949, the team was shuttered. Watson does not appear to have played organized hockey since.

== Awards and honors ==
Award	Year
AHCA First Team All-American	1947–48
AHCA First Team All-American	1948–49
