= Len Ceglarski =

American ice hockey player and coach (1926–2017)

Biographical details
- Born: June 27, 1926; East Walpole, Massachusetts, U.S.
- Died: December 16, 2017 (aged 91)
- Education: Boston College

Playing career
- 1948–1951: Boston College
- 1951–1952: US Olympic Team
- 1954–1955: Worcester Warriors
- Position: Left wing

Coaching career (HC unless noted)
- 1958–1972: Clarkson
- 1972–1992: Boston College

Head coaching record
- Overall: 673–339–37 (.659)
- Tournaments: 13–20 (.394)

Accomplishments and honors

Championships
- 1949 NCAA National Champion; 1966 ECAC Hockey Champion; 1966 ECAC Hockey Tournament Champion; 1978 ECAC Hockey Tournament Champion; 1980 ECAC Hockey East Region Champion; 1980 ECAC Hockey Champion; 1981 ECAC Hockey East Region Champion; 1984 ECAC Hockey East Region Champion; 1985 Hockey East Champion; 1986 Hockey East Champion; 1987 Hockey East Champion; 1987 Hockey East Tournament Champion; 1989 Hockey East Champion; 1990 Hockey East Champion; 1990 Hockey East Tournament Champion; 1991 Hockey East Champion

Awards
- 1966 Spencer Penrose Award; 1973 Spencer Penrose Award; 1974 Boston College Varsity Athletic Hall of Fame; 1985 Hockey East Coach of the Year; 1985 Spencer Penrose Award; 1990 Lester Patrick Trophy; 1991 Clarkson Athletic Hall of Fame; 1992 US Hockey Hall of Fame; 1993 National Polish-American Sports Hall of Fame; 1996 Hobey Baker Legend of College Hockey Award; 2001 Massachusetts Hockey Hall of Fame
Medal record
Men's ice hockey
Representing the United States
Olympics
Silver medal – second place	1952 Oslo

Leonard Stanley Ceglarski (June 27, 1926 – December 16, 2017) was an American ice hockey player and coach. He was an All-American left wing on Boston College's 1949 NCAA championship team, and was captain of the 1950–51 squad. He was also a member of the U.S. Olympic hockey team that won the silver medal at the 1952 Winter Olympic Games in Oslo, Norway. Ceglarski was also known as a baseball player. While at Boston College, his .429 batting average as a senior second baseman was best in New England.

== Career ==
=== Playing ===
Ceglarski in 1950

Ceglarski played three seasons of varsity ice hockey at Boston College. He helped the team win the National Championship as a sophomore in just the second year it was held. After serving as team captain for his senior season, Ceglarski joined the US national team and earned a spot on the roster for the 1952 Winter Olympics. Ceglarski served as a depth player for team USA, recording 3 points in 8 games, but did help the team to a silver medal finish. After the Olympics, Ceglarski's playing career was largely finished but he did make a brief appearance with the Worcester Warriors in 1954.

=== Coaching ===
A native of East Walpole, Massachusetts, Ceglarski taught and coached at Walpole High for four years before beginning his collegiate coaching career. He took the reins of the Golden Knights’ program from retiring Clarkson mentor Bill Harrison. At Clarkson, he had various responsibilities. He was responsible not only for varsity coaching, but for the freshman team, the rink, the equipment, and the laundry, and served as his secretary and the team's skate sharpener.

==== Clarkson College ====
In 1958, Ceglarski began his coaching career at Clarkson College of Technology. When Ceglarski started coaching in the late 1950s, he was the fourth head coach in Clarkson's storied tradition. It took Ceglarski only four seasons to guide the Knights to their first NCAA championship game. In 1962, Clarkson beat Michigan 5–4 to make hockey history by becoming the first Eastern team to defeat a Western squad in the first round of the Final Four since 1954. Clarkson fell to Michigan Tech in the 1962 title game, closing out a 22–3–1 campaign.

During the 1965–66 season, Ceglarski boasted his best Clarkson squad, winning the ECAC Tournament and once again making it to the deciding game in the NCAA tournament. The Knights defeated Denver, 4–3, before falling to the Michigan State Spartans in the title game. The club had a 24–3 record in 1965–66. At the end of the season, he was awarded his first Spencer Penrose Trophy, which goes annually to the national coach of the year. He also earned this honor in 1978 and 1985.

For the third time in less than 10 years, Ceglarski's team advanced to the NCAA Championship when the Knights battled Cornell for the 1970 NCAA championship. After skating past Michigan Tech, 4–3, in the semifinals, Clarkson fell just short against the Cornell Big Red, suffering a 6–4 loss in Lake Placid. The club finished the season with a 24–8 record. He led the Golden Knights to three national championship games, compiling a 254–97–11 record. He left Clarkson in 1972 to become a hockey coach at his alma mater Boston College. The vacancy left by Ceglarski would be filled by Jerry York, who would also go on to coach at his alma mater, Boston College.

==== Boston College ====
When long-time Boston College coach John "Snooks" Kelley retired as the Eagles coach in 1972, Ceglarski decided to return to his alma mater. While at Boston College, Ceglarski guided the Eagles to 419 victories through two decades at the Heights. Ceglarski retired in 1992 with 689 career wins. At the time, it was the most in Division I history; as of 2017, he ranks ninth on the all-time list, and third all-time at BC, falling short of Kelley's 501 wins. Ceglarski's vacancy would be filled by interim coach Steve Cedorchuk, but after two seasons, Jerry York again followed Ceglarski by becoming the Eagles' head coach.

==== Legacy ====
When Ceglarski concluded his 34-year hockey coaching career in 1992, he retired with the most victories ever amassed in the history of the game at the college level. His first win came with Clarkson's 10–2 win at Providence on December 5, 1958. His teams at Clarkson and Boston College won 673 games, lost only 339 and tied 38. Over that time, Ceglarski-coached teams had only four losing campaigns.

Serving for 14 years as the head coach of the Clarkson Golden Knights, Ceglarski compiled a .717 winning percentage, posting a 254–97–10 overall record from 1958–1972. He guided Clarkson to four NCAA Tournament berths and its first ECAC Tournament title. Ceglarski's teams finished as runners-up in the NCAA Tournament in 1961–62, 1965–66, 1969–70 and 1977–78. The first three were the only Clarkson squads to have reached the national championship game. Ceglarski's 1977–78 BC squad also finished as NCAA runner-up, losing to Boston University in the finals.

In 34 seasons (1958–1992), he became the winningest coach in the history of college hockey with a record of 673–339–37. In 14 seasons at Clarkson, he had a record of 254–97–10 and a record of 419–242–27 in 20 seasons at Boston College. He is the first man in college hockey ever to coach 1,000 games. He was inducted into the Boston College Varsity Club Athletic Hall of Fame in 1974.

== Honors ==
Several honors have been bestowed upon Ceglarski. He was a 1974 member of the Boston College Varsity Club Athletic Hall of Fame. In 1990, he won the Lester Patrick Trophy, an annual award presented for outstanding service to hockey in the United States. Ceglarski was also inducted into the U.S. Hockey Hall of Fame in 1992, and was named the 1996 recipient of the Legend of College Hockey Award. In 1993, Ceglarski was inducted into the National Polish American Sports Hall of Fame. Ceglarski was the winner of the 1984–85 CCM / Bob Kullen Award. Sponsored by CCM, the award is given in the name of Bob Kullen, who served as head coach of the New Hampshire Wildcats. The award goes to the head coach who is considered to have demonstrated the highest number of significant accomplishments throughout the season as voted by the conference's head coaches.

The Len Ceglarski Award for Individual Sportsmanship was given by the league to one player who had consistently demonstrated superior conduct and sportsmanship on the ice. The directors of Hockey East established the Award in 1992. Each school nominates one player and the award is then voted upon by head coaches, sports information directors, and league officials. The first winner was Joe Flanagan, a senior forward from the University of New Hampshire. One of Ceglarski's former players, John T. McLennan honored his mentor by creating a $1.5 million endowment to fund the Leonard S. Ceglarski Chair at Clarkson. McLennan was offered an athletic scholarship to play hockey at Clarkson in 1964, and McLennan earned a master's degree in industrial management and went on to become president and CEO of Bell Canada before retiring in 1997. McLennan credits Ceglarski with the success he achieved in his life. The chair will fund the Clarkson men's head hockey coach position.

== Playing record ==
Year	Team	GP	G	A	P	PIM
1950–51	Boston College	20	21	13	34	0
1951–52	U.S. Olympic Team	N/A	N/A	N/A	N/A	N/A
1954–55	Worcester Warriors	3	0	1	1	0

== Head coaching record ==
Record table
Season	Team	Overall	Conference	Standing	Postseason
Clarkson Golden Knights (Tri-State League) (1958–1961)
1958–59	Clarkson	10–8–1	2–3–0	T-2nd	
1959–60	Clarkson	7–13–0	0–4–0	3rd	
1960–61	Clarkson	14–8–0	1–3–0	3rd	
Clarkson:		31–29–1	3–10–0		
Clarkson Golden Knights (ECAC Hockey) (1961–1971)
1961–62	Clarkson	22–3–1	13–1–1	3rd	NCAA Runner-Up
1962–63	Clarkson	20–4–2	11–2–2	2nd	NCAA Consolation Game (Win)
1963–64	Clarkson	17–7–1	10–5–1	8th	ECAC Third Place Game (Loss)
1964–65	Clarkson	18–7–0	11–4–0	3rd	ECAC Third Place Game (Loss)
1965–66	Clarkson	24–3–0	11–1–0	1st	NCAA Runner-Up
1966–67	Clarkson	14–8–1	8–6–1	6th	ECAC Quarterfinals
1967–68	Clarkson	16–7–1	11–5–0	2nd	ECAC Third Place Game (Win)
1968–69	Clarkson	19–7–2	12–5–1	4th	ECAC Third Place Game (Loss)
1969–70	Clarkson	24–8–0	14–3–0	2nd	NCAA Runner-Up
1970–71	Clarkson	28–4–1	16–2–1	2nd	ECAC Runner-Up
1971–72	Clarkson	20–10–0	12–8–0	6th	ECAC Quarterfinals
Clarkson:		222–68–9	129–42–7		
Boston College Eagles (ECAC Hockey) (1972–1984)
1972–73	Boston College	22–7–1	13–5–1	3rd	NCAA Consolation Game (Win)
1973–74	Boston College	16–12–0	8–11–0	11th	
1974–75	Boston College	11–15–2	6–12–2	12th	
1975–76	Boston College	15–13–1	11–9–1	8th	ECAC Quarterfinals
1976–77	Boston College	18–11–1	13–9–1	5th	ECAC Quarterfinals
1977–78	Boston College	24–10–0	14–9–0	5th	NCAA Runner-Up
1978–79	Boston College	16–14–0	10–12–0	11th	
1979–80	Boston College	25–7–1	18–3–1	1st	ECAC Quarterfinals
1980–81	Boston College	20–8–3	13–6–3	2nd	ECAC Quarterfinals
1981–82	Boston College	19–11–0	13–8–0	5th	ECAC Quarterfinals
1982–83	Boston College	15–13–2	9–10–2	11th	
1983–84	Boston College	26–13–0	15–6–0	t-2nd	NCAA Quarterfinals
Boston College:		227–134–11	143–100–11		
Boston College Eagles (Hockey East) (1984–1992)
1984–85	Boston College	28–15–2	24–9–1	1st	NCAA Consolation Game (Loss)
1985–86	Boston College	26–13–3	23–9–2	1st	NCAA Quarterfinals
1986–87	Boston College	31–8–0	26–6–0	1st	NCAA Quarterfinals
1987–88	Boston College	13–18–3	10–14–2	5th	Hockey East Quarterfinals
1988–89	Boston College	25–11–4	16–6–4	1st	NCAA Quarterfinals
1989–90	Boston College	28–13–1	15–6–0	1st	NCAA Frozen Four
1990–91	Boston College	27–12–0	16–5–0	1st	NCAA West Regional Quarterfinals
1991–92	Boston College	15–18–3	10–9–2	5th	Hockey East Semifinals
Boston College:		193–108–16	140–64–11		
Total:		673–339–37			
National champion Postseason invitational champion Conference regular season champion Conference regular season and conference tournament champion Division regular season champion Division regular season and conference tournament champion Conference tournament champion

== Awards and honors ==
Award	Year
AHCA Second team all-american	1949–50

== See also ==
- List of college men's ice hockey coaches with 400 wins

Awards and achievements
Preceded by James Fullerton; John Kelley; Mike Sertich	Spencer Penrose Award; 1965–66 (With Amo Bessone); 1972–73; 1984–85	Succeeded by Edward Jeremiah; Charlie Holt; Ralph Backstrom
Preceded by Award Created	Bob Kullen Coach of the Year Award; 1984–85	Succeeded by Jack Parker
Preceded by John Mayasich	Hobey Baker Legends of College Hockey Award; 1996	Succeeded by Lou Lamoriello
