= 1947–48 NCAA men's ice hockey season =

- Duration: November 1947– March 20, 1948
- NCAA tournament: 1948
- National championship: Broadmoor Ice Palace; Colorado Springs, Colorado
- NCAA champion: Michigan

The 1947–48 NCAA men's ice hockey season began in November 1947 and concluded with the 1948 NCAA Men's Ice Hockey Tournament's championship game on March 20, 1948 at the Broadmoor Ice Palace in Colorado Springs, Colorado. This was the 1st season in which an NCAA ice hockey championship was held and is the 54th year overall where an NCAA school fielded a team. In 1947 there were quasi-official guidelines separating major and minor football programs across the NCAA, but no such determinations had been made for ice hockey teams. Even among the universities that played ice hockey, no such distinctions were even attempted until the mid-1960s. As such, all American universities operating a men's varsity ice hockey program are included here.

As this was the first time a national championship was held, it is considered (unofficially) the first season of NCAA Division I ice hockey since it is the first time that any college teams would have to conform to NCAA regulations regarding recruitment, scholarship, eligibility, etc. The tournament was, itself, born out of a desire to definitively decide the best collegiate team in the country. With only a handful of universities even playing ice hockey (indoor ice rinks were fairly expensive to operate) and even less playing a decent number of games each year only four teams were selected to play in the tournament.

== Regular season ==
=== Season tournaments ===
Tournament	Dates	Teams	Champion
NEIHL Tournament	March 8–9	4	Boston College

=== Standings ===
1947–48 NCAA Independent ice hockey standings
	Intercollegiate							Overall					
	GP	W	L	T	Pct.	GF	GA	GP	W	L	T	GF	GA
Army	16	11	4	1	.719	78	39	16	11	4	1	78	39
Bemidji State	5	0	5	0	.000	13	36	10	2	8	0	37	63
Boston College	19	14	5	0	.737	126	60	19	14	5	0	126	60
Boston University	24	20	4	0	.833	179	86	24	20	4	0	179	86
Bowdoin	9	4	5	0	.444	45	68	11	6	5	0	56	73
Brown	14	5	9	0	.357	61	91	14	5	9	0	61	91
California	10	2	8	0	.200	45	67	18	6	12	0	94	106
Clarkson	12	5	6	1	.458	67	39	17	10	6	1	96	54
Colby	8	2	6	0	.250	28	41	8	2	6	0	28	41
Colgate	10	7	3	0	.700	54	34	13	10	3	0	83	45
Colorado College	14	9	5	0	.643	84	73	27	19	8	0	207	120
Cornell	4	0	4	0	.000	3	43	4	0	4	0	3	43
Dartmouth	23	21	2	0	.913	156	76	24	21	3	0	156	81
Fort Devens State	13	3	10	0	.231	33	74	–	–	–	–	–	–
Georgetown	3	2	1	0	.667	12	11	7	5	2	0	37	21
Hamilton	–	–	–	–	–	–	–	14	7	7	0	–	–
Harvard	22	9	13	0	.409	131	131	23	9	14	0	135	140
Lehigh	9	0	9	0	.000	10	100	11	0	11	0	14	113
Massachusetts	2	0	2	0	.000	1	23	3	0	3	0	3	30
Michigan	18	16	2	0	.889	105	53	23	20	2	1	141	63
Michigan Tech	19	7	12	0	.368	87	96	20	8	12	0	91	97
Middlebury	14	8	5	1	.607	111	68	16	10	5	1	127	74
Minnesota	16	9	7	0	.563	78	73	21	9	12	0	100	105
Minnesota–Duluth	6	3	3	0	.500	21	24	9	6	3	0	36	28
MIT	19	8	11	0	.421	93	114	19	8	11	0	93	114
New Hampshire	13	4	9	0	.308	58	67	13	4	9	0	58	67
North Dakota	10	6	4	0	.600	51	46	16	11	5	0	103	68
North Dakota Agricultural	8	5	3	0	.571	43	33	8	5	3	0	43	33
Northeastern	19	10	9	0	.526	135	119	19	10	9	0	135	119
Norwich	9	3	6	0	.333	38	58	13	6	7	0	56	70
Princeton	18	8	10	0	.444	65	72	21	10	11	0	79	79
St. Cloud State	12	10	2	0	.833	55	35	16	12	4	0	73	55
St. Lawrence	9	6	3	0	.667	65	27	13	8	4	1	95	50
Suffolk	–	–	–	–	–	–	–	–	–	–	–	–	–
Tufts	4	3	1	0	.750	17	15	4	3	1	0	17	15
Union	9	1	8	0	.111	7	86	9	1	8	0	7	86
Williams	11	3	6	2	.364	37	47	13	4	7	2	–	–
Yale	16	5	10	1	.344	60	69	20	8	11	1	89	85

1947–48 Minnesota Intercollegiate Athletic Conference ice hockey standings
	Conference							Overall					
	GP	W	L	T	PTS	GF	GA	GP	W	L	T	GF	GA
Hamline †	–	–	–	–	–	–	–	–	–	–	–	–	–
Augsburg	–	–	–	–	–	–	–	–	–	–	–	–	–
Concordia	–	–	–	–	–	–	–	5	1	4	0	–	–
Gustavus Adolphus	–	–	–	–	–	–	–	7	1	5	1	–	–
Macalester	–	–	–	–	–	–	–	–	–	–	–	–	–
Saint John's	–	–	–	–	–	–	–	12	5	6	0	–	–
St. Olaf	–	–	–	–	–	–	–	11	8	3	0	–	–
St. Thomas	–	–	–	–	–	–	–	11	6	5	0	–	–
† indicates conference champion

1947–48 New England Intercollegiate Hockey League standings
	Conference							Overall					
	GP	W	L	T	PTS	GF	GA	GP	W	L	T	GF	GA
Boston University †	13	12	1	0	.923	86	40	24	20	4	0	179	86
Boston College *	10	9	1	0	.900	77	29	19	14	5	0	126	60
Northeastern	14	8	6	0	.571	108	79	19	10	9	0	135	119
Bowdoin	6	3	3	0	.500	32	38	11	6	5	0	56	73
MIT	14	5	9	0	.357	62	87	19	8	11	0	93	114
Middlebury	6	2	4	0	.333	27	48	16	10	5	1	127	74
New Hampshire	10	3	7	0	.300	42	56	13	4	9	0	58	67
Norwich	7	2	5	0	.286	25	50	13	6	7	0	56	70
Fort Devens State	11	3	8	0	.273	30	55	–	–	–	–	–	–
Colby	5	1	4	0	.200	17	27	8	2	6	0	28	41
† indicates conference champion * indicates conference tournament champion

1947–48 Pentagonal League standings
	Conference							Overall					
	GP	W	L	T	PTS	GF	GA	GP	W	L	T	GF	GA
Dartmouth †	7	7	0	0	1.000	49	20	24	21	3	0	156	81
Army	4	2	2	0	.500	12	17	16	11	4	1	78	39
Harvard	7	3	4	0	.429	31	33	23	9	14	0	135	140
Princeton	7	2	5	0	.286	23	31	21	10	11	0	79	79
Yale	7	2	5	0	.286	20	32	20	8	11	1	89	85
† indicates conference champion

== 1948 NCAA Tournament ==
Semifinals; March 18–19
E1	Dartmouth	8
W2	Colorado College	4
W1	Michigan	6*
E2	Boston College	4

National Championship; March 20
E1	Dartmouth	4
W1	Michigan	8

Note: * denotes overtime period(s)

== Player stats ==
=== Scoring leaders ===
The following players led the league in points at the conclusion of the season.

GP = Games played; G = Goals; A = Assists; Pts = Points; PIM = Penalty minutes

Player	Class	Team	GP	G	A	Pts	PIM
Gordon McMillan	Junior	Michigan	23	32	30	62	20
Dick Rowell	Junior	Colorado College	–	18	37	55	–
Bill Riley	Graduate	Dartmouth	–	30	23	53	–
Wally Gacek	Junior	Michigan	23	27	26	53	8
Dana Hixon	Sophomore	Boston University	–	33	16	49	–
Al Renfrew	Junior	Michigan	23	26	21	47	14
Thomas Gerard	Sophomore	St. Lawrence	15	23	19	42	–
Bob Mason	Sophomore	Boston College	–	21	19	40	–
Arthur Moher	Junior	Yale	–	21	19	40	–
Don Cleary	Junior	Boston University	–	21	16	37	–

=== Leading goaltenders ===
The following goaltenders led the league in goals against average at the end of the regular season while playing at least 33% of their team's total minutes.

GP = Games played; Min = Minutes played; W = Wins; L = Losses; OT = Overtime/shootout losses; GA = Goals against; SO = Shutouts; SV% = Save percentage; GAA = Goals against average

Player	Class	Team	GP	Min	W	L	OT	GA	SO	SV%	GAA
Robert O'Connor	Sophomore	Princeton	18	-	-	-	-	-	-	-	1.72
Jack McDonald	Junior	Michigan	23	1410	20	2	1	63	2	-	2.68
Ralph Bevins	Sophomore	Boston University	24	1450	20	4	0	86	2	-	3.56
Gene Delvecchio	Freshman	St. Lawrence	14	803	-	-	-	52	2	-	3.88
Bob Murray	Sophomore	North Dakota	-	-	-	-	-	-	1	.894	4.07
Ian Watson	Junior	California	16	965	5	11	0	76	0	-	4.73
James Burns	Sophomore	Yale	-	-	-	-	-	-	-	-	5.07

== Awards ==
=== NCAA ===
Award		Recipient
Most Outstanding Player in NCAA Tournament		Joe Riley, Dartmouth
AHCA All-American Teams
First Team	Position	Second Team
Ian Watson, California	G	Bernie Burke, Boston College
Ross Smith, Michigan	D	Connie Hill, Michigan
Butch Songin, Boston College	D	George Pulliam, Dartmouth
Pat Finnegan, California	F	Jim Bell, Northeastern
Bill Riley, Dartmouth	F	Roland DePaul, Minnesota
Joe Slattery, Colorado College	F	Wally Gacek, Michigan
