= Joe Riley (ice hockey) =

American ice hockey player

- Born: December 14, 1923 Medford, Massachusetts, U.S.
- Died: October 25, 1976 (aged 52)
- Position: Forward
- Played for: Dartmouth Big Green
- Playing career: 1947–1949

Joseph A. Riley (December 14, 1923– October 25, 1976) was an American ice hockey player. He was born in Medford, Massachusetts. Riley helped lead Dartmouth College to two Frozen Fours during his career. He was inducted into the United States Hockey Hall of Fame in 2002. His brothers John and Bill are also in the USHOF.

== Awards and honors ==
Award	Year
All-NCAA All-Tournament First Team	1948, 1949
AHCA First Team All-American	1948–49
NCAA Tournament MVP	1948

Awards and achievements
Preceded by Award Created	NCAA Tournament Most Outstanding Player; 1948	Succeeded by Dick Desmond
