= Bill Riley (ice hockey, born 1921) =

American ice hockey player

- Born: October 6, 1921 Medford, Massachusetts, U.S.
- Died: February 16, 2000 (aged 78)
- Position: Forward
- Played for: Dartmouth
- NHL draft: Undrafted
- Playing career: 1942–1949

William J. Riley (October 6, 1921, in Medford, Massachusetts – February 16, 2000) was an ice hockey player. Riley helped lead Dartmouth College to the first two Frozen Fours during his career, ending as runners-up in both 1948 and 1949. He was inducted into the United States Hockey Hall of Fame in 1977. His brothers John and Joe are also in the USHOF.

== Awards and honors ==
| Award | Year |
|---|---|
| AHCA First Team All-American | 1947–48 |
| NCAA All-Tournament First Team | 1948 |
| AHCA First Team All-American | 1948–49 |
| NCAA All-Tournament Second Team | 1949 |

Awards and achievements
| Preceded by Gordon McMillan | NCAA Ice Hockey Scoring Champion; 1948–49 | Succeeded by Jack Garrity |
