= 1949 NCAA men's ice hockey tournament =

College ice hockey tournament

- Teams: 4
- Finals site: Broadmoor Ice Palace, Colorado Springs, Colorado
- Champions: Boston College Eagles (1st title)
- Runner-up: Dartmouth Indians (2nd title game)
- Semifinalists: Colorado College Tigers (2nd Frozen Four); Michigan Wolverines (2nd Frozen Four)
- Winning coach: John "Snooks" Kelley (1st title)
- MOP: Dick Desmond (Dartmouth)
- Attendance: 9,700

The 1949 NCAA Men's Ice Hockey Tournament was the culmination of the 1948–49 NCAA men's ice hockey season, the second such tournament in NCAA history. It was held between March 17 and 19, 1949, and concluded with Boston College defeating Dartmouth 4-3. All games were played at the Broadmoor Ice Palace in Colorado Springs, Colorado.

This is the first time that a consolation game was played in an NCAA tournament. The practice would continue unabated until it was abolished after the 1989 tournament.

All four teams selected for the tournament had played in the championship the previous season. This has only occurred one other time, in 1975, counting either all tournament entries or only the final four teams. (as of 2016)

== Qualifying teams ==
Four teams qualified for the tournament, two each from the eastern and western regions. The teams were selected by a committee based upon both their overall record and the strength of their opponents.

| East | | | | | | | West | | | | | | |
| Seed | School | Conference | Record | Berth type | Appearance | Last bid | Seed | School | Conference | Record | Berth type | Appearance | Last bid |
|---|---|---|---|---|---|---|---|---|---|---|---|---|---|
| 1 | Boston College | Independent | 19–1–0 | At-Large | 2nd | 1948 | 1 | Michigan | Independent | 19–1–3 | At-Large | 2nd | 1948 |
| 2 | Dartmouth | Independent | 16–5–0 | At-Large | 2nd | 1948 | 2 | Colorado College | Independent | 15–5–1 | At-Large | 2nd | 1948 |

== Format ==
The eastern and western teams judged as better were seeded as the top regional teams. The second eastern seed was slotted to play the top western seed and vice versa. All games were played at the Broadmoor Ice Palace. All matches were Single-game eliminations with the semifinal winners advancing to the national championship game and the losers playing in a consolation game.

== Bracket ==
Semifinals; March 17–18
E1 | Boston College | 7
W2 | Colorado College | 3
W1 | Michigan | 2
E2 | Dartmouth | 4

National championship March 19
E1 | Boston College | 4
E2 | Dartmouth | 3
Third-place game
W1 | Michigan | 10
W2 | Colorado College | 4

Note: * denotes overtime period(s)

== Results ==
=== Semifinals ===
==== Michigan vs. Dartmouth ====
| March 17 | Michigan | 2 – 4 | Dartmouth | Broadmoor Ice Palace | Recap |
| (Grant, Hill) Gil Burford - 00:18 | | First period | 07:48 - PP - Joe Riley |
| (Renfrew) Wally Gacek - 10:21 | | Second period | 12:46 - Bill Riley; 16:06 - GW - Alan Kerivan; 18:08 - Joe Riley |
| No scoring | | Third period | No scoring |
| Jack McDonald | | Goalie stats | Dick Desmond |

==== Boston College vs. Colorado College ====
| March 18 | Boston College | 7 – 3 | Colorado College | Broadmoor Ice Palace | Recap |
| (unassisted) Fran Harrington - 08:43 (Harrington, Ceglarski) Jack Mulhern - 15:21 | | First period | 13:08 - Milo Yalich (Ray) |
| (Harrington) Jack Mulhern - 03:16 (Harrington, Ceglarski) Jack Mulhern - GW - 10:17 (Lewis) John McIntire - 12:38 | | Second period | 05:04 - Milo Yalich (Rowell, Ray) |
| (unassisted) Warren Lewis - 04:49 (Mulhern) Len Ceglarski - 09:49 | | Third period | 14:41 - Ron Newson (Slattery) |
| Bernie Burke | | Goalie stats | Roy Ikola |

=== Consolation Game ===
==== Michigan vs. Colorado College ====
| March 19 | Michigan | 10 – 4 | Colorado College | Broadmoor Ice Palace | Recap |
| (Burford) Neil Celley - SH - 12:53 (McMillan) Wally Gacek - 14:?? (Burford) Neil Celley - 17:09 (Celley) Gil Burford - 17:25 | | First period | 19:?? - Chris Ray (unknown) |
| (Burford) Gordon McMillan - GW - 00:48 (unknown) Gil Burford - 05:52 (Renfrew, Gacek) Gordon McMillan - 07:18 (unknown) Wally Gacek - 12:47 | | Second period | 19:38 - Milo Yalich (unknown) |
| (unknown) Gordon McMillan - SH - 10:19 (unknown) Al Renfrew - 18:34 | | Third period | 08:55 - Ron Newson (unknown); 18:04 - Harry Whitworth (unknown) |
| Jack McDonald | | Goalie stats | Roy Ikola |

=== (E1) Boston College vs. (E2) Dartmouth ===
| March 19 | Boston College | 4 – 3 | Dartmouth | Broadmoor Ice Palace |

Scoring summary
| Period | Team | Goal | Assist(s) | Time | Score |
|---|---|---|---|---|---|
| 1st | BC | Warren Lewis | Fitzgerald | 6:04 | 1–0 BC |
| 1st | DC | Walter Crowley | Oss | 10:34 | 1–1 |
| 1st | DC | Bill Riley | unassisted | 19:32 | 2–1 DC |
| 2nd | BC | John McIntire | Lewis and Fitzgerald | 23:43 | 2–2 |
| 2nd | BC | Len Ceglarski | Harrington and Mulhern | 33:04 | 3–2 BC |
| 3rd | DC | Alan Kerivan | Crowley | 42:01 | 3–3 |
| 3rd | BC | Jim Fitzgerald | Lewis | 46:47 | 4–3 BC |
Penalty summary
| Period | Team | Player | Penalty | Time | PIM |
| 1st | DC | Joe Riley | | | 2:00 |
| 2nd | BC | John McIntire | | | 2:00 |
| 2nd | DC | Robert Gray | | | 2:00 |
| 3rd | DC | Mike Thayer | | | 2:00 |
| 3rd | BC | Jack Mulhern | | | 2:00 |
| 3rd | BC | Jack Mulhern | Misconduct | | 10:00 |
| 3rd | DC | Bill Riley | | | 2:00 |

Goaltenders
| Team | Name | Saves | Goals against | Time on ice |
|---|---|---|---|---|
| BC | Bernie Burke | 26 | 3 | |
| DC | Dick Desmond | 38 | 4 | |

== All-Tournament team ==
=== First Team ===
- G: Dick Desmond* (Dartmouth)
- D: Ed Songin (Boston College)
- D: Mike Thayer (Dartmouth)
- F: Wally Grant (Michigan)
- F: Jack Mulhern (Boston College)
- F: Joe Riley (Dartmouth)

* Most Outstanding Player(s)

=== Second Team ===
- G: Bernie Burke (Boston College)
- D: Ron Newson (Colorado College)
- D: Lew Meier (Colorado College)
- F: Bill Riley (Dartmouth)
- F: Wally Gacek (Michigan)
- F: Connie Hill (Michigan)
