= Richard Desmond (ice hockey) =

American ice hockey player (1927–1990)

- Born: March 2, 1927 Medford, Massachusetts, U.S.
- Died: November 1, 1990 (aged 63)
- Position: Goaltender
- Caught: Left
- Played for: Dartmouth Big Green
- National team: United States
- Playing career: 1949–1952
Medal record
Men's ice hockey
Representing the United States
Olympics
Silver medal – second place	1952 Oslo

Richard Joseph "Dick" Desmond (March 2, 1927 – November 1, 1990) was an American ice hockey player who was a member of the American 1952 Winter Olympics ice hockey team. He was inducted into the United States Hockey Hall of Fame in 1988.

== Awards and honors ==
Award	Year
NCAA All-Tournament Second Team	1948
AHCA First Team All-American	1948–49
NCAA All-Tournament First Team	1949
NCAA Tournament MVP	1949

Awards and achievements
Preceded by Joe Riley	NCAA Tournament Most Outstanding Player; 1949	Succeeded by Ralph Bevins
