= David Ross Smith =

Canadian ice hockey player

Ross Smith
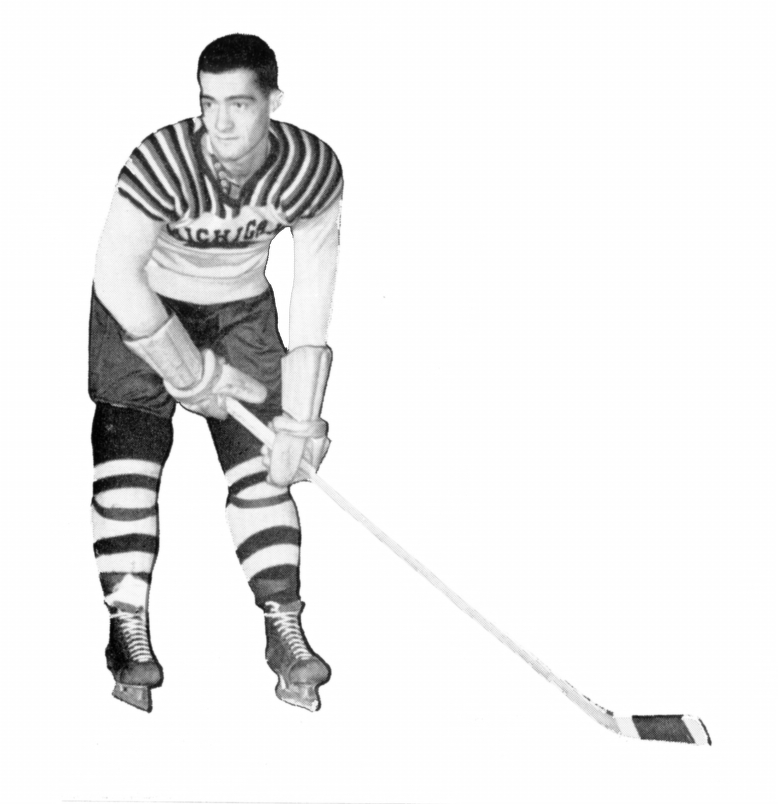
- Born: Toronto, Ontario, Canada
- Position: Defence
- Played for: Michigan
- Playing career: 1945–1950

David Ross Smith is a former ice hockey defenceman who played for Michigan just after World War II.

== Career ==
Ross arrived in Michigan immediately after the war after graduating from De La Salle High School. He took the following year off before returning for the 1947–48 season. He played left defense for the best team in the country that season, earning AHCA First Team All-American honors and helping the Wolverines win the inaugural National Championship.

Ross played two more seasons with Michigan, helping the team reach the NCAA tournament two more years, but the team fell short both times. Ross was twice named team MVP and was inducted into the Dekers Club Hall of Fame in 1969.

== Awards and honors ==
Award	Year
AHCA First Team All-American	1947–48
NCAA All-Tournament Second Team	1948
AHCA First Team All-American	1949–50
NCAA All-Tournament First Team	1950
