= 1948–49 NCAA men's ice hockey season =

- Duration: November 1948– March 19, 1949
- NCAA tournament: 1949
- National championship: Broadmoor Ice Palace; Colorado Springs, Colorado
- NCAA champion: Boston College

The 1948–49 NCAA men's ice hockey season began in November 1948 and concluded with the 1949 NCAA Men's Ice Hockey Tournament's championship game on March 19, 1949 at the Broadmoor Ice Palace in Colorado Springs, Colorado. This was the 2nd season in which an NCAA ice hockey championship was held and is the 55th year overall where an NCAA school fielded a team.

== Regular season ==
=== Season tournaments ===
Tournament	Dates	Teams	Champion
NEIHL Tournament	March 8–9	4	Boston College

=== Standings ===
1948–49 NCAA Independent ice hockey standings
	Intercollegiate							Overall					
	GP	W	L	T	Pct.	GF	GA	GP	W	L	T	GF	GA
American International	7	4	3	0	.571	37	39	7	4	3	0	37	39
Army	14	7	7	0	.500	52	59	15	8	7	0	58	63
Boston College	20	19	1	0	.950	134	64	22	21	1	0	164	67
Boston University	20	13	7	0	.650	147	77	20	13	7	0	147	77
Bowdoin	–	–	–	–	–	–	–	12	4	8	0	–	–
Brown	–	–	–	–	–	–	–	14	7	7	0	58	62
California	–	–	–	–	–	–	–	–	–	–	–	–	–
Clarkson	–	–	–	–	–	–	–	13	8	5	0	69	59
Colby	–	–	–	–	–	–	–	–	–	–	–	–	–
Colgate	–	–	–	–	–	–	–	9	5	3	1	53	38
Colorado College	–	–	–	–	–	–	–	24	15	7	1	153	99
Dartmouth	–	–	–	–	–	–	–	23	17	6	0	148	72
Fort Devens State	–	–	–	–	–	–	–	–	–	–	–	–	–
Georgetown	–	–	–	–	–	–	–	–	–	–	–	–	–
Hamilton	–	–	–	–	–	–	–	10	1	9	0	–	–
Harvard	–	–	–	–	–	–	–	20	12	8	0	130	112
Lehigh	3	1	2	0	.333	7	16	6	2	4	0	18	48
Massachusetts	–	–	–	–	–	–	–	3	0	3	0	11	29
Michigan	–	–	–	–	–	–	–	25	20	2	3	179	74
Michigan Tech	–	–	–	–	–	–	–	15	5	10	0	66	76
Middlebury	–	–	–	–	–	–	–	10	6	4	0	–	–
Minnesota	–	–	–	–	–	–	–	22	11	11	0	120	101
Minnesota–Duluth	–	–	–	–	–	–	–	7	7	0	0	44	12
MIT	–	–	–	–	–	–	–	9	4	5	0	–	–
New Hampshire	–	–	–	–	–	–	–	3	0	3	0	11	23
North Dakota	–	–	–	–	–	–	–	22	9	12	1	109	148
North Dakota Agricultural	–	–	–	–	–	–	–	–	–	–	–	–	–
Northeastern	–	–	–	–	–	–	–	16	9	7	0	118	78
Princeton	–	–	–	–	–	–	–	20	6	13	1	60	110
Saint Michael's	–	–	–	–	–	–	–	4	0	4	0	23	38
St. Lawrence	–	–	–	–	–	–	–	7	5	2	0	41	29
Union	–	–	–	–	–	–	–	1	0	1	0	–	–
Williams	–	–	–	–	–	–	–	14	5	9	0	–	–
Wyoming	–	–	–	–	–	–	–	9	4	5	0	51	45
Yale	–	–	–	–	–	–	–	22	9	13	0	77	103

1948–49 Minnesota Intercollegiate Athletic Conference ice hockey standings
	Conference							Overall					
	GP	W	L	T	PTS	GF	GA	GP	W	L	T	GF	GA
St. Thomas †	–	–	–	–	–	–	–	16	11	4	1	–	–
Augsburg	–	–	–	–	–	–	–	–	–	–	–	–	–
Concordia	–	–	–	–	–	–	–	8	3	5	0	–	–
Gustavus Adolphus	–	–	–	–	–	–	–	10	5	4	1	–	–
Hamline	–	–	–	–	–	–	–	–	–	–	–	–	–
Macalester	–	–	–	–	–	–	–	–	–	–	–	–	–
Saint John's	–	–	–	–	–	–	–	9	3	6	0	–	–
St. Olaf	–	–	–	–	–	–	–	11	2	9	0	–	–
† indicates conference champion

== 1949 NCAA Tournament ==
Semifinals; March 17–18
E1	Boston College	7
W2	Colorado College	3
W1	Michigan	2
E2	Dartmouth	4

National championship March 19
E1	Boston College	4
E2	Dartmouth	3
Third-place game
W1	Michigan	10
W2	Colorado College	4

Note: * denotes overtime period(s)

== Player stats ==
=== Scoring leaders ===
The following players led the league in points at the conclusion of the season.

GP = Games played; G = Goals; A = Assists; Pts = Points; PIM = Penalty minutes

Player	Class	Team	GP	G	A	Pts	PIM
Bill Riley	Senior	Dartmouth	–	37	41	78	–
Jack Mulhern	Sophomore	Boston College	–	34	31	65	18
Gordon McMillan	Senior	Michigan	25	24	36	60	19
Gil Burford	Sophomore	Michigan	25	26	30	56	20
Wally Gacek	Senior	Michigan	25	31	20	51	4
Dick Rowell	Senior	Colorado College	–	19	31	50	–
Joe Slattery	Senior	Colorado College	–	25	25	50	–
Warren Lewis	Junior	Boston College	–	23	24	47	6
Wally Grant	Junior	Michigan	25	18	28	46	2
Neil Celley	Sophomore	Michigan	25	28	16	44	16

=== Leading goaltenders ===
The following goaltenders led the league in goals against average at the end of the regular season while playing at least 33% of their team's total minutes.

GP = Games played; Min = Minutes played; W = Wins; L = Losses; OT = Overtime/shootout losses; GA = Goals against; SO = Shutouts; SV% = Save percentage; GAA = Goals against average

Player	Class	Team	GP	Min	W	L	OT	GA	SO	SV%	GAA
Bernie Burke	Senior	Boston College	21	1243	20	1	0	64	0	-	3.09
Robert O'Connor	Sophomore	Princeton	16	-	-	-	-	-	-	-	3.12
Gene Delvecchio	Sophomore	St. Lawrence	12	726	-	-	-	54	0	-	4.46
James Burns	Junior	Yale	-	-	-	-	-	-	-	-	5.06
Bob Murray	Junior	North Dakota	-	-	8	10	1	-	0	.819	6.80

== Awards ==
=== NCAA ===
Award		Recipient
Most Outstanding Player in NCAA Tournament		Dick Desmond, Dartmouth
AHCA All-American Team
Player	Pos	Team
Dick Desmond	G	Dartmouth
Ian Watson	G	California
Connie Hill	D	Michigan
Butch Songin	D	Boston College
Jim Starrak	D	Colorado College
Dick Starrak	D	Michigan
Wally Gacek	F	Michigan
Wally Grant	F	Michigan
Bill Riley	F	Dartmouth
Joe Riley	F	Dartmouth
Dick Rowell	F	Colorado College
Joe Slattery	F	Colorado College
