= Gordon McMillan =

Canadian ice hockey player (1927–2021)

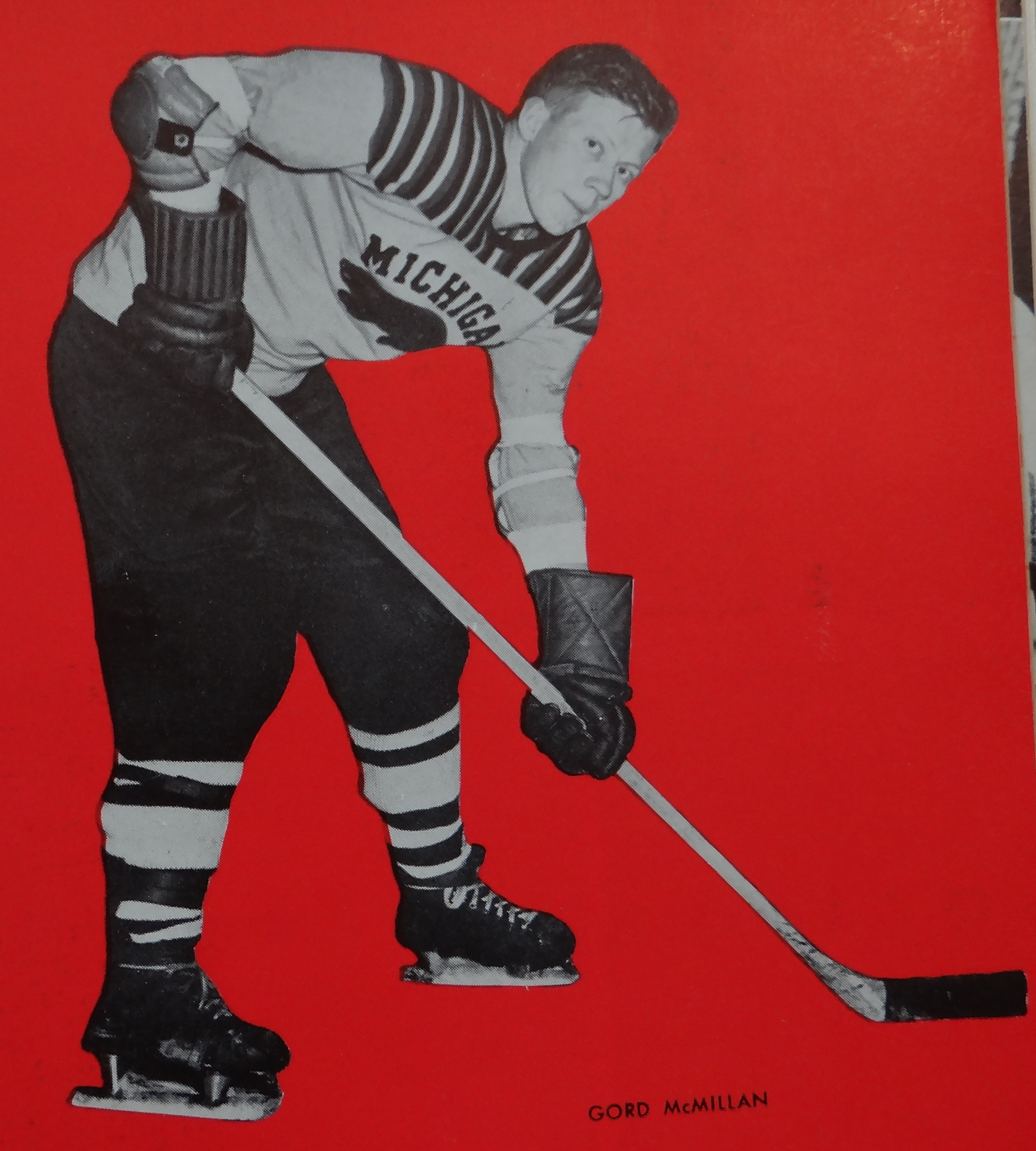
McMillan from 1948 Michiganensian

Gordon Warner "Gymie" McMillan (4 January 1927 – 18 May 2021) was an ice hockey player who was a member of the Michigan Wolverines team that won the first NCAA Frozen Four ice hockey championship in 1948. He played four years of hockey at Michigan from 1946-1949 and broke the school's scoring record with 210 career points.

== Moose Jaw Monarchs ==
McMillan grew up in Moose Jaw, Saskatchewan, where he played center for the Moose Jaw Monarchs. In April 1945, the Monarchs traveled to Lethbridge, Alberta to play the Lethbridge Native Sons for the western Canada juvenile hockey championship. McMillan, described as the team's "star centre" and a "starry redhead who is the mainspring of the Moose Jaw attack," was left behind in Moose Jaw because his father was seriously ill. However, he arrived in Lethbridge by plane on the morning of the first game, and scored four goals and an assist, as his heads-up hockey and "fast break-aways kept the crowd in a dither." The Monarchs won the series in two games, and McMillan was the high scorer with six goals and an assist. One month after the championship, McMillan's 42-year-old father, a hockey coach who had been recently discharged from the Royal Canadian Air Force, died in Moose Jaw.

== University of Michigan ==
In the fall of 1945, McMillan enrolled at the University of Michigan to play hockey for Wolverines' coach Vic Heyliger. McMillan played four years of hockey at Michigan, from 1946-1949, and was the team's leading scorer all four years. As a freshman in January 1946, McMillan and teammate Wally Grant both scored hat tricks in a game against McMaster University from Hamilton, Ontario.

As a junior in 1948, McMillan broke Michigan's all-time scoring record, which had been set by the team's coach, Vic Heyliger, with 116 points. McMillan, who would exceed the record by nearly 100 points by the time he was finished, broke the record with Heyliger on the bench as coach in a February 1948 game against Michigan Tech; McMillan earned six points on four goals and two assists in the game. The 1948 team led by McMillan, Wally Grant, Wally Gacek and Al Renfrew won the first NCAA Frozen Four ice hockey championship. Four teams were selected to play in the first NCAA ice hockey championship, held at the Broadmoor World Arena in Colorado Springs, Colorado. The four teams to play in the inaugural Frozen Four were Michigan, Boston College, Dartmouth and Colorado College. In the championship game against Dartmouth, McMillan scored two goals, as Michigan won 8-4. McMillan and teammate Wally Gacek scored goals five seconds apart in the third period against Dartmouth, which remains a record for the fastest consecutive goals in the championship round. The hockey title capped off a year in which Michigan had also won the Rose Bowl and the conference basketball championship.

As a senior in 1949, McMillan had career highs with 36 assists and 60 points. (His career-high in goals was 30 in 1948.) Though Michigan did not repeat as NCAA champions in 1949, they did advance to the Frozen Four. They were beaten by Dartmouth 4-2 in a semi-final game. In his final game in a Michigan jersey, the Frozen Four consolation game in March 1949, McMillan scored a hat trick, earning five points on three goals and two assists.

McMillan's four-year scoring record at Michigan was as follows:

			Regular season
Season	Team	League	GP	G	A	Pts	PIM
1945–46	Michigan	NCAA	23	29	27	56	16
1946–47	Michigan	NCAA	21	14	21	35	16
1947–48	Michigan	NCAA	23	32	30	62	20
1948–49	Michigan	NCAA	25	24	36	60	19
	Total		92	99	114	213	71

== Professional hockey ==
McMillan played professionally in the 1949–50 season for the Windsor Ryan Cretes in the International Hockey League. He played in 12 games and scored 3 goals and 6 assists.

== See also ==
- University of Michigan Athletic Hall of Honor
- 1948 NCAA Men's Division I Ice Hockey Tournament
- 1949 NCAA Men's Division I Ice Hockey Tournament

Awards and achievements
Preceded by Honor Created	NCAA Ice Hockey Scoring Champion; 1947–48	Succeeded by Bill Riley
