= Wally Gacek =

Canadian ice hockey player (1926–2020)

Walter Frank Gacek (June 26, 1926 – May 27, 2020) was a Canadian ice hockey player who was a member of the Michigan Wolverines team that won the first NCAA ice hockey championship in 1948. He played four years of hockey at Michigan from 1946 to 1949.

== Junior Hockey ==
Gacek grew up in Winnipeg, Manitoba, and played for the St. James Canadians, a Winnipeg team that played in the 1944 western Canada junior hockey championship.

== University of Michigan ==
Gacek later enrolled at the University of Michigan. As a freshman in 1946, Gacek helped Michigan win the Big Ten Conference hockey championship by scoring the tying goal against the University of Minnesota in the season's final game. In 1948, he played for the Michigan team that won the first ever NCAA Frozen Four ice hockey championship. Four teams were selected to play in the first Frozen Four tournament, held at The Broadmoor World Arena in Colorado Springs, Colorado. The four teams were Michigan, Boston College, Dartmouth College, and Colorado College. The semifinal game went into overtime, and Gacek scored 18 seconds into the overtime period, and then scored again with a half minute left in overtime, as Michigan beat Boston College 6–4. In the championship game against Dartmouth, Gacek scored two goals in the first period and another in the third period to complete a hat trick, as Michigan won 8–4. Gacek starred as the center on Michigan's famous "G" line, which included Wally Grant and Ted Greer. Each of the three linemates scored a third-period goal in Michigan's championship game against Dartmouth. Gacek led all scorers in the first Frozen Four with five goals and three assists for eight points. His six points in the championship game (3 goals, 3 assists) remains the record for an NCAA championship game. Gacek and Gordon McMillan scored goals five seconds apart in the third period against Dartmouth, which also remains a record for the fastest consecutive goals by a team in the championship round. The hockey title capped off a year in which Michigan had also won the Rose Bowl and the conference basketball championship.

== Awards and honors ==
Award	Year
AHCA Second Team All-American	1947–48
NCAA All-Tournament Second Team	1948, 1949
AHCA First Team All-American	1948–49

In 1949, he was selected as Michigan's Most Valuable Player. In 2007, Gacek was inducted into the University of Michigan Athletic Hall of Honor.

== See also ==
- University of Michigan Athletic Hall of Honor
