= John P. Riley Jr. =

American ice hockey player and coach

Jack Riley

Biographical details
- Born: June 15, 1920; Boston, Massachusetts, U.S.
- Died: February 3, 2016 (aged 95); Sandwich, Massachusetts, U.S.

Playing career
- 1940–1942: Dartmouth
- 1946–1947: Dartmouth
- 1947–1949: US National Team
- 1949–1950: Boston Olympics
- Position: Left wing

Coaching career (HC unless noted)
- 1950–1986: Army
- 1959–1960: US National Team

Head coaching record
- Overall: 542–343–20 (.610)

Accomplishments and honors

Awards
- 1957 Spencer Penrose Award; 1960 Spencer Penrose Award; 1979 US Hockey Hall of Fame; 1986 Lester Patrick Award; 1998 International Ice Hockey Hall of Fame; 2002 Lester Patrick Award; 2004 Army Sports Hall of Fame
Medal record
Men's Ice hockey
Representing the USA
World Championships
Bronze medal – third place	1949 Sweden
Olympics
Gold medal – first place	1960 Squaw Valley

John Patrick Riley (June 15, 1920 – February 3, 2016) was an American ice hockey player and coach. The hockey coach at West Point for more than 35 years, Riley coached the United States to the gold medal at the 1960 Squaw Valley Olympics. He played for the U.S. Olympic team at the 1948 St. Moritz Olympics. He received the Lester Patrick Trophy in 1986 (as an individual) and 2002 (as part of the 1960 Olympic team) along with being inducted into both the United States Hockey Hall of Fame in 1979 and the International Ice Hockey Federation Hall of Fame in 1998.

== Biography ==
Riley was born in Boston in 1920 and raised in Medford, Massachusetts. He played prep-school hockey at Tabor Academy and graduated in 1939. He played college hockey at Dartmouth College (1940–1942 and 1946–47) as well as for the U.S. Naval Air Corps (1942–1946). In 1948 he was part of an American team that was disqualified as two rival teams arrived for the Americans at the St. Moritz Olympics. He was then player-coach of the national team at the 1949 IIHF World Championship.

Riley began his Army coaching career in 1950, remaining the Cadets' head coach through 1986. During his tenure, he twice won the Spencer Penrose Award for NCAA Coach of the Year. He was replaced by one of his sons, Rob Riley in 1986. Another son, Brian Riley, took over the job from Rob in 2004. Rob's son Brett was named as the inaugural head coach at Long Island University in 2020.

Riley was appointed to coach the USA team for the 1960 Olympic Games, the ninth held with hockey. The United States had finished with a silver medal in the last two Games in 1952 and 1956, with the latter being the first time the Soviet Union had won the gold medal. One of Riley's last decisions before the Games was to cut Herb Brooks (fresh from his play at Minnesota) from the team. John Mayasich joined the team a day before the games started to go alongside fellow late-joiners Bill Cleary and Bob Cleary; noting the discontent the team had at these late decisions (which he defended even when they threatened to not play), Riley later stated "I'd rather have an unhappy ship than a bunch of guys that love each other and play like horse(bleep)." Days later, his American team surprised the hockey world going undefeated in winning the country's first Olympic gold medal. At that time, the Soviet Union had never lost to America in hockey and had even beat them 18–1 one year prior to the games. America then stunned Canada 2–1 and Soviet Union 3–2 before beating Czechoslovakia 9–4 to win the gold medal.

Twenty years later, Brooks would be hired to coach the American team at Lake Placid, New York, which resulted in a gold medal for the country, which beat the Soviets (who had not lost to the Americans since 1960) on February 22, 1980, in the medal round before beating Finland to win the gold; the win over the Soviets is now referred to as the "Miracle on Ice". In Olympic hockey from 1956 to 1988, Riley and Brooks were the only coaches to lead a team to a gold medal over the Soviet Union; for the rest of his life, Riley bitterly contended that his team had been forgotten as the bigger underdog, with Riley once stating that "the Russians were just as good then as they were in 1980." In his tenure with Army, the team had 29 winning seasons, with a peak school-record of 28 victories during the 1983-84 season and he was the second-winningest head coach in college history upon his retirement.

Riley was inducted in the United States Hockey Hall of Fame in 1979, and the International Ice Hockey Federation Hall of Fame in 1998. He is a two-time winner of the Lester Patrick Trophy, in 1986 (as a coach) and 2002 (as a member of the Olympic gold medal-winning United States hockey team of 1960).

In the 1960s, Riley ran the Eastern Hockey Clinic (a hockey camp for high school-age players) in Worcester, Massachusetts. The camp had many NHL players as coaches, including John Ferguson, Tommy Williams (the only American NHL player at the time), Jean Ratelle, and Charlie Hodge. He was married to Maureen Hines until her death in 1989; they had five children together. Riley died on February 3, 2016, at a retirement home in Sandwich, Massachusetts.

== Head coaching record ==
Record table
Season	Team	Overall	Conference	Standing	Postseason
Army Cadets Independent (1950–1961)
1950–51	Army	2–10–1			
1951–52	Army	3–12–0			
1952–53	Army	8–8–0			
1953–54	Army	10–7–0			
1954–55	Army	8–8–0			
1955–56	Army	11–5–0			
1956–57	Army	14–4–0			
1957–58	Army	15–4–1			
1958–59	Army	9–10–1			
1959–60	Army	16–5–1			
1960–61	Army	17–8–0			
Army:		113–81–4			
Army Cadets (ECAC Hockey) (1961–1973)
1961–62	Army	17–6–1	14–4–1	5th	ECAC Quarterfinals
1962–63	Army	17–6–2	12–4–2	6th	ECAC Quarterfinals
1963–64	Army	20–8–0	17–4–0	2nd	ECAC Quarterfinals
1964–65 (Note: Following the 1963–64 season, the ECAC split its hockey league into two divisions, with the primary ECAC league continuing in the University Division and its second level, known as ECAC 2, becoming the sport's first College Division conference. Army remained in the ECAC Hockey through the 1972–73 season.)	Army	17–7–0	3–7–0	12th	
1965–66	Army	17–7–1	3–6–1	11th	
1966–67	Army	15–12–0	4–6–0	10th	
1967–68	Army	14–10–0	5–7–0	12th	
1968–69	Army	20–7–1	4–6–1	10th	
1969–70	Army	13–12–0	5–8–0	11th	
1970–71	Army	8–14–1	3–7–1	11th	
1971–72	Army	11–14–0	1–9–0	17th	
1972–73	Army	9–17–1	1–9–0	17th	
Army:		178–120–7	72–77–6		
Army Cadets (ECAC 2) (1973–1980)
1973–74 (Note: With the establishment of the NCAA's current three-division setup in 1973, Army chose to move to Division II hockey, while remaining in Division I for most other sports.)	Army	20–7–1			
1974–75	Army	18–11–0			
1975–76	Army	18–9–1			
1976–77	Army	22–6–1			
1977–78	Army	13–12–1			
1978–79	Army	7–21–0			
1979–80	Army	19–12–1			
Army:		117–78–5			
Army Cadets (ECAC Hockey) (1980–1986)
1980–81 (Note: Army returned to Division I hockey in 1980 and has remained at that level ever since.)	Army	21–13–1	(Note: While Army had been readmitted to the ECAC Hockey, it did not play a conference schedule until the 1984–85 season.)		
1981–82	Army	25–11–0			
1982–83	Army	25–11–1			
1983–84	Army	28–5–1			
1984–85	Army	17–13–0	0–11–0	12th	
1985–86	Army	18–11–1	2–9–0	11th	
Army:		134–64–4	2–20–0		
Total:		542–343–20			
National champion Postseason invitational champion Conference regular season champion Conference regular season and conference tournament champion Division regular season champion Division regular season and conference tournament champion Conference tournament champion

== See also ==
- List of college men's ice hockey coaches with 400 wins

Awards and achievements
Preceded by William Harrison; John Kelley	Spencer Penrose Award; 1956–57; 1959–60	Succeeded by Harry Cleverly; Murray Armstrong
Preceded by Al Renfrew	Hobey Baker Legends of College Hockey Award; 1991	Succeeded by John "Connie" Pleban
