= 1948 NCAA men's ice hockey tournament =

College ice hockey tournament

- Teams: 4
- Finals site: Broadmoor Ice Palace, Colorado Springs, Colorado
- Champions: Michigan Wolverines (1st title)
- Runner-up: Dartmouth Indians (1st title game)
- Semifinalists: Colorado College Tigers (1st Frozen Four); Boston College Eagles (1st Frozen Four)
- Winning coach: Vic Heyliger (1st title)
- MOP: Joe Riley (Dartmouth)
- Attendance: 7,900

The 1948 NCAA Men's Ice Hockey Tournament was the culmination of the 1947–48 NCAA men's ice hockey season, the first such tournament in NCAA history. It was held between March 18 and 20, 1948, and concluded with Michigan defeating Dartmouth 8-4. All games were played at the Broadmoor Ice Palace in Colorado Springs, Colorado.

This inaugural tournament possesses two distinctions beyond being the first of its kind: it was the championship with the fewest games played (3) with all succeeding tournaments having a minimum of 4 games. Additionally, the overtime rules used were not sudden-death and 10 minutes in length, allowing Michigan to score multiple times in the first overtime game in tournament history (the next overtime game would not happen until 1954).

== Qualifying teams ==
Four teams qualified for the tournament, two each from the eastern and western regions. The teams were selected by a committee based upon both their overall record and the strength of their opponents.

East							West						
Seed	School	Conference	Record	Berth type	Appearance	Last bid	Seed	School	Conference	Record	Berth type	Appearance	Last bid
1	Dartmouth	Independent	20–2–0	At-Large	1st	Never	1	Michigan	Independent	18–2–1	At-Large	1st	Never
2	Boston College	Independent	14–4–0	At-Large	1st	Never	2	Colorado College	Independent	19–7–0	At-Large	1st	Never

== Format ==
The eastern and western teams judged as better were seeded as the top regional teams. The second eastern seed was slotted to play the top western seed and vice versa. All games were played at the Broadmoor Ice Palace. All matches were Single-game eliminations with the semifinal winners advancing to the national championship game.

== Bracket ==
Semifinals; March 18–19
E1	Dartmouth	8
W2	Colorado College	4
W1	Michigan	6*
E2	Boston College	4

National Championship; March 20
E1	Dartmouth	4
W1	Michigan	8

Note: * denotes overtime period(s)

== Results ==
=== Semifinals ===
March 18, 1948; 8:15 pm MST	(E1) Dartmouth	8–4 (2–1, 1–3, 5–0)	(W2) Colorado College	Broadmoor Ice Palace; Attendance: 2,500

Game reference

Dick Desmond
Goalies
Roy Ikola

(Oss, Crowley) James Malone – 10:26	1 – 0
	1 – 1	12:48 – Bruce Stewart (unassisted)
(Campbell, B. Riley) Joe Riley – 18:32	2 – 1
	2 – 2	27:28 – Ron Newson (Wishart, Whitworth)
	2 – 3	36:00 – Dick Rowell (Slattery)
(unassisted) Joe Riley – 36:53	3 – 3
	3 – 4	38:08 – Dick Rowell (Stewart)
(Merriam) Joe Riley – 42:03	4 – 4
(B. Riley) Joe Riley – GW – 46:18	5 – 4
(unassisted) Bill Riley – 47:58	6 – 4
(J. Riley) Bill Riley – 54:11	7 – 4
(Malone) Walt Crowley – 55:17	8 – 4

March 19, 1948; 8:15 pm MST	(W1) Michigan	6–4 (OT) (1–1, 1–2, 2–1, 2–0)	(E2) Boston College	Broadmoor Ice Palace

Game reference

Jack McDonald
Goalies
Bernie Burke

	0 – 1	10:23 – Giles Threadgold (McCusker)
(unassisted) Connie Hill – 17:13	1 – 1
	1 – 2	25:41 – PP – Bob Mason (Corcoran)
	1 – 3	28:24 – Joe McCusker (Threadgold, McIntyre)
(Renfrew) Connie Hill – 39:57	2 – 3
(unassisted) Connie Hill – 43:44	3 – 3
(McMillan) Al Renfrew – 45:41	4 – 3
	4 – 4	59:20 – EA – Jim Fitzgerald (Lewis)
(Grant) Wally Gacek – GW – 60:18	5 – 4
(Hill) Wally Gacek – EN – 69:30	6 – 4

=== National Championship ===
March 20, 1948; 8:15 pm MST	(W1) Michigan	8–4 (2–2, 2–2, 4–0)	(E1) Dartmouth	Broadmoor Ice Palace; Attendance: 2,700

Referees: Ed French; John Gustafson

Scoring summary
Period	Team	Goal	Assist(s)	Time	Score
1st	UM	Wally Gacek	Grant	0:50	1–0 UM
1st	DC	Bill Riley – PP	Merriam	4:25	1–1
1st	UM	Wally Gacek	Grant	10:55	2–1 UM
1st	DC	Crawford Campbell – PP	unasisted	17:25	2–2
2nd	DC	Walt Crowley	B. Riley	26:55	3–2 DC
2nd	DC	Arnold Oss	Malone	31:05	4–2 DC
2nd	UM	Wally Grant – SH	Gacek	35:20	4–3 DC
2nd	UM	Gordon McMillan – PP	Greer	36:40	4–4
3rd	UM	Wally Grant – GW	Gacek and Greer	41:30	5–4 UM
3rd	UM	Gordon McMillan – PP	Renfrew	46:15	6–4 UM
3rd	UM	Wally Gacek	Grant and Greer	46:20	7–4 UM
3rd	UM	Ted Greer	Gacek	55:14	8–4 UM
Penalty summary
Period	Team	Player	Penalty	Time	PIM
1st
1st	UM	Ross Smith	Boarding	4:10	2:00
1st	UM	Dick Starrak	Tripping	16:00	2:00
2nd	DC	Walt Crowley	High-sticking	24:00	2:00
2nd	DC	Howie Richmond	Tripping	29:40	2:00
2nd	UM	Wally Grant	Tripping	30:30	2:00
2nd	UM	Al Renfrew	Tripping	31:10	2:00
2nd	UM	Dick Starrak	Boarding	34:00	2:00
2nd	UM	Al Renfrew	Boarding	34:00	2:00
2nd	DC	Crawford Campbell	Hooking	35:10	2:00
3rd
3rd	DC	Bob Thayer	Boarding	41:31	5:00
3rd	DC	Bob Thayer	Misconduct	47:30	10:00
3rd	UM	Ross Smith	Boarding	56:15	2:00
3rd	UM	Leonard Brumm	Charging	58:00	2:00
3rd	DC	Jack Kilmartin	Slashing	58:00	2:00

Shots by period
Team	1	2	3	T
Dartmouth	12	9	8	29
Michigan	10	13	18	41

Goaltenders
Team	Name	Saves	Goals against	Time on ice
DC	Dick Desmond	33	8	
UM	Jack McDonald	25	4	

== All-Tournament Team ==
=== First Team ===
- G: Bernie Burke (Boston College)
- D: Connie Hill (Michigan)
- D: Ron Newson (Colorado College)
- F: Wally Grant (Michigan)
- F: Bill Riley (Dartmouth)
- F: Joe Riley* (Dartmouth)

* Most Outstanding Player(s)

=== Second Team ===
- G: Dick Desmond (Dartmouth)
- D: Ross Smith (Michigan)
- D: Ed Songin (Boston College)
- F: Wally Gacek (Michigan)
- F: Bruce Stewart (Colorado College)
- F: Joe Slattery (Colorado College)
