= Wally Grant =

American ice hockey player (1927–2014)

- Born: December 8, 1927; Leonidas, Minnesota, U.S.
- Died: November 5, 2014 (aged 86); Ann Arbor, Michigan, U.S.

Wallace Daniel Grant (December 8, 1927 – November 5, 2014) was an American ice hockey player. Grant helped the University of Michigan win the first NCAA National Championship in 1948. He was inducted into the University of Michigan Athletic Hall of Honor in 1987 and the United States Hockey Hall of Fame in 1994.

== Minnesota state championship ==
Grant was born and raised in Leonidas, Minnesota. He was the son of an immigrant father who had worked in an open-pit ore mine since he was a young man, and had become a superintendent for U.S. Steel. Grant learned to skate on an ice rink that his father made by flooding a small grassy area near their home. Nicknamed "Cedar Legs" because of his bowed legs, Grant attended nearby Eveleth High School, where he was the left wing and captain of the hockey team that won the first Minnesota state hockey championship in 1945. Eveleth outscored the competition 30-3 in the inaugural tournament. Grant played most of the game in the finals against Thief River Falls and scored the game-tying and game-winning goals within a span of 61 seconds in the third period.

Interviewed in 2001, Grant said the 1945 state championship still blinked in his memory like giant neon billboards. He told a reporter, "I remember my father was behind the net at the other end. He was cheering us on. ... Dad wasn't a man known for emotional displays. He was very aloof, but you knew he was proud after we won."

Eveleth, Minnesota, a city of fewer than 5,000 residents in Minnesota's Iron Range, is the site of the United States Hockey Hall of Fame and has produced a string of college, Olympic and professional hockey stars, including Frank Brimsek, John Matchefts, John Mayasich, Willard Ikola, Sam LoPresti, Wally Grant, Oscar Almquist, Serge Gambucci, Mike Karakas, John Mariucci, Mark Pavelich, and Connie Pleban.

== University of Michigan ==
After graduating from high school, Grant enrolled in at the University of Michigan, where he played four seasons of hockey between 1945 and 1950. He took one year off after his freshman year to serve in the U.S. Army. In 1948, he played on the first NCAA Frozen Four ice hockey championship team. Four teams were selected to play in the first NCAA ice hockey championship, held at the Broadmoor Hotel Ice Palace in Colorado Springs, Colorado. The four teams to play in the inaugural Frozen Four were Michigan, Boston College, Dartmouth and Colorado College. Grant played on Michigan's famous "G" line, which included Wally Gacek and Ted Greer. Each of the three linemates scored a third-period goal in Michigan's championship win over Dartmouth in 1948. Michigan's hockey title in 1948 capped off a year in which Michigan had also won the National Championship in football, and the conference basketball championship.

Grant was named an All-American three times, in 1948, 1949 and 1950, and captain of the 1950 team. In his four years at Michigan, Grant scored 63 goals and 83 assists for 146 career points. Michigan coach Vic Heyliger called Grant "the best two-way hockey player I have ever seen." Grant was not a large player, but he was fast. He later recalled, "I was 5'8 and 165 pounds, but I was fast enough to get around some of those defensemen. That was my advantage."

== Later years and honors ==
Grant graduated from Michigan with a business degree in 1950 and worked for 37 years for General Motors, retiring in 1987 as comptroller of the Warren Division of Hydra-Matic. He continued to follow Michigan Wolverines hockey and was the vice president of the Dekers Blue Line Club — a Michigan hockey booster organization. He and wife raised three children in the Ann Arbor area. In 2007, Grant and his wife endowed the Mickey and Wally Grant Scholarship for Hockey at the University of Michigan. Grant died on November 5, 2014, at the age of 86.

Award	Year
NCAA All-Tournament First Team	1948, 1949
AHCA First Team All-American	1948–49
NCAA All-Tournament Second Team	1950

Grant was inducted in the University of Michigan Athletic Hall of Honor in 1987, and the U.S. Hockey Hall of Fame in 1994.

== See also ==
- University of Michigan Athletic Hall of Honor
- 1948 NCAA Men's Division I Ice Hockey Tournament
