= 1947–48 Yale Bulldogs men's ice hockey season =

College ice hockey season

- Conference: T–4th Pentagonal League
- Home ice: New Haven Arena

Record
- Overall: 8–11–1
- Conference: 2–5–0
- Home: 7–3–1
- Road: 0–8–0
- Neutral: 1–0–0

Coaches and captains
- Head coach: Murray Murdoch
- Captain: Arthur Moher

The 1922–23 Yale Bulldogs men's ice hockey season was the 53rd season of play for the program but first under the oversight of the NCAA. The Bulldogs represented Yale University and were coached by Murray Murdoch in his 10th season.

== Season ==
After narrowly missing out on an Intercollegiate title the previous year, came in the season as one of the favorites for a bid into the newly created NCAA tournament. The Bulldogs were a bit slow off the mark as they struggled to earn a win in their opening game against Brown, who were back on the ice for the first time since 1939. The Elis looked much better in their second game when they rolled to an easy victory over Colby.

Yale racked up a third early-season win but then went on an 18-day vacation over the winter break. When the team returned to the ice they looked sluggish and Army took advantage, handing the Elis their first loss of the year.

== Roster ==
No.	Nat.	Player	Class	Pos	Height	Weight	DoB	Hometown	Previous team
		Walter Allen		F
		Vernon Armour		F			1927-07-01	Lake Forest, Illinois
		James Burns		G
		Joe Calhoun
		John Calhoun Jr.		D				Cornwall, Connecticut
		Allen Clapp		F			1924-11-30	Waban, Massachusetts
		Lawrence Dalley Jr.					1927-02-11	New York, New York
		David Guernsey		F			1926-09-22	New York, New York
		Hart
		Holms
		Kelley
		McCracken
		Meyer
		Arthur Moher (C)	Senior	F
		John Polito					1926-06-03
		Robert Raines		D				Minneapolis, Minnesota
		Alexander Read		F				Boston, Massachusetts
		Gordon Ritz		F
		John Soper		D
		Henry Van Dyke		F
		Terrance Van Ingen					1924-11-17	Manhattan, New York
		Richard Welch		D
		Wells
		Richard Wood		F

== Standings ==
1947–48 NCAA Independent ice hockey standings
	Intercollegiate							Overall					
	GP	W	L	T	Pct.	GF	GA	GP	W	L	T	GF	GA
Army	16	11	4	1	.719	78	39	16	11	4	1	78	39
Bemidji State	5	0	5	0	.000	13	36	10	2	8	0	37	63
Boston College	19	14	5	0	.737	126	60	19	14	5	0	126	60
Boston University	24	20	4	0	.833	179	86	24	20	4	0	179	86
Bowdoin	9	4	5	0	.444	45	68	11	6	5	0	56	73
Brown	14	5	9	0	.357	61	91	14	5	9	0	61	91
California	10	2	8	0	.200	45	67	18	6	12	0	94	106
Clarkson	12	5	6	1	.458	67	39	17	10	6	1	96	54
Colby	8	2	6	0	.250	28	41	8	2	6	0	28	41
Colgate	10	7	3	0	.700	54	34	13	10	3	0	83	45
Colorado College	14	9	5	0	.643	84	73	27	19	8	0	207	120
Cornell	4	0	4	0	.000	3	43	4	0	4	0	3	43
Dartmouth	23	21	2	0	.913	156	76	24	21	3	0	156	81
Fort Devens State	13	3	10	0	.231	33	74	–	–	–	–	–	–
Georgetown	3	2	1	0	.667	12	11	7	5	2	0	37	21
Hamilton	–	–	–	–	–	–	–	14	7	7	0	–	–
Harvard	22	9	13	0	.409	131	131	23	9	14	0	135	140
Lehigh	9	0	9	0	.000	10	100	11	0	11	0	14	113
Massachusetts	2	0	2	0	.000	1	23	3	0	3	0	3	30
Michigan	18	16	2	0	.889	105	53	23	20	2	1	141	63
Michigan Tech	19	7	12	0	.368	87	96	20	8	12	0	91	97
Middlebury	14	8	5	1	.607	111	68	16	10	5	1	127	74
Minnesota	16	9	7	0	.563	78	73	21	9	12	0	100	105
Minnesota–Duluth	6	3	3	0	.500	21	24	9	6	3	0	36	28
MIT	19	8	11	0	.421	93	114	19	8	11	0	93	114
New Hampshire	13	4	9	0	.308	58	67	13	4	9	0	58	67
North Dakota	10	6	4	0	.600	51	46	16	11	5	0	103	68
North Dakota Agricultural	8	5	3	0	.571	43	33	8	5	3	0	43	33
Northeastern	19	10	9	0	.526	135	119	19	10	9	0	135	119
Norwich	9	3	6	0	.333	38	58	13	6	7	0	56	70
Princeton	18	8	10	0	.444	65	72	21	10	11	0	79	79
St. Cloud State	12	10	2	0	.833	55	35	16	12	4	0	73	55
St. Lawrence	9	6	3	0	.667	65	27	13	8	4	1	95	50
Suffolk	–	–	–	–	–	–	–	–	–	–	–	–	–
Tufts	4	3	1	0	.750	17	15	4	3	1	0	17	15
Union	9	1	8	0	.111	7	86	9	1	8	0	7	86
Williams	11	3	6	2	.364	37	47	13	4	7	2	–	–
Yale	16	5	10	1	.344	60	69	20	8	11	1	89	85

1947–48 Pentagonal League standings
	Conference							Overall					
	GP	W	L	T	PTS	GF	GA	GP	W	L	T	GF	GA
Dartmouth †	7	7	0	0	1.000	49	20	24	21	3	0	156	81
Army	4	2	2	0	.500	12	17	16	11	4	1	78	39
Harvard	7	3	4	0	.429	31	33	23	9	14	0	135	140
Princeton	7	2	5	0	.286	23	31	21	10	11	0	79	79
Yale	7	2	5	0	.286	20	32	20	8	11	1	89	85
† indicates conference champion

== Schedule and results ==
Date	Opponent	Site	Result	Record
Regular season
December 10	Brown*	New Haven Arena • New Haven, Connecticut	W 5–4	1–0–0
December 13	Colby*	New Haven Arena • New Haven, Connecticut	W 7–3	2–0–0
December 17	St. Nicholas Hockey Club*	New Haven Arena • New Haven, Connecticut	W 7–5	3–0–0
January 10	at Army	Smith Rink • West Point, New York	L 3–4	3–1–0 (0–1–0)
January 14	Clarkson*	New Haven Arena • New Haven, Connecticut	T 6–6 ^{OT}	3–1–1
January 17	Boston University*	New Haven Arena • New Haven, Connecticut	L 3–4	3–2–1
January 21	St. Nicholas Hockey Club*	New Haven Arena • New Haven, Connecticut	W 10–3	4–2–1
January 24	Dartmouth	New Haven Arena • New Haven, Connecticut	L 0–6	4–3–1 (0–2–0)
January 31	vs. Westchester All-Stars*	Norwalk, Connecticut	W 7–2	5–3–1
February 3	at Rye Hawks*	Rye, New York	L 5–6	5–4–1
February 6	at Michigan*	Weinberg Coliseum • Ann Arbor, Michigan	L 1–6	5–5–1
February 7	at Michigan*	Weinberg Coliseum • Ann Arbor, Michigan	L 3–7	5–6–1
February 11	California*	New Haven Arena • New Haven, Connecticut	L 2–6	5–7–1
February 12	at Brown*	Rhode Island Auditorium • Providence, Rhode Island	L 7–8	5–8–1
February 14	at Dartmouth	Davis Rink • Hanover, New Hampshire	L 4–9	5–9–1 (0–3–0)
February 21	at Princeton	Hobey Baker Memorial Rink • Princeton, New Jersey	L 3–6	5–10–1 (0–4–0)
February 27	Princeton	New Haven Arena • New Haven, Connecticut	W 2–1 ^{OT}	6–10–1 (1–4–0)
March 6	Harvard	New Haven Arena • New Haven, Connecticut	W 4–3	7–10–1 (2–4–0)
March 13	at Harvard	Boston Arena • Boston, Massachusetts	L 4–3	7–11–1 (2–5–0)
March 6	Harvard*	New Haven Arena • New Haven, Connecticut	W 10–3 †	8–11–1
*Non-conference game.

† The game was ended 75 seconds early due to a brawl between both teams.
