= 1947–48 Fort Devens State Chiefs men's ice hockey season =

- Conference: 9th NEIHL
- Home ice: Skating Club of Boston Rink

Record
- Overall: 3–10–0
- Conference: 3–8–0
- Home: 2–2–0
- Road: 1–7–0
- Neutral: 0–1–0

Coaches and captains

The 1947–48 Fort Devens State Chiefs men's ice hockey season was the 2nd season of play for the program but first under the oversight of the NCAA. The Chiefs represented Massachusetts State College–Fort Devens.

== Season ==
In just its second season of existence, Fort Devens State was able to join the New England Intercollegiate Hockey League, a loose collection of teams that included some of the nation's top programs. While the Chiefs weren't expected to win many games, the stronger competition could allow the team to build itself into a respectable outfit by season's end. From the start, however, it was clear that Devens had some work to do. The team lost its opening game 1–10 but saw a swift turnaround when the fell to MIT by just a single goal. The Chiefs continued their ascent in the third game and held the lead over Boston College after the first period. While the couldn't hold the lead, the team had at least proved they could put up a fight.

Fort Devens was able to post its first win of the season just before the winter break and then notched their second victory once they returned. With the team suddenly in the midst of a playoff hunt, Devens' offense flagged in January and the team went through an extended losing skid. The lowest game for the club came against Harvard where the Chiefs were thoroughly dominated 2–17. The game was also notable for being very physical with many penalties handed out while several players were taken off the ice due to injury. The team managed to get one more win before ending the season by being shutout by BC.

Despite the lackluster play in as the year went on, Fort Devens had found a diamond in the rough as Hal Downes was credited with stellar play throughout the season. The netminder was hailed as the main reason for the team's competitiveness in several matches.

== Roster ==
No.	Nat.	Player	Class	Pos	Height	Weight	DoB	Hometown	Previous team
		Bruce
		Burke
		Burns
		Jim Devlin		RW
		Hal Downes		G
		Ellis		D
		Ernie Falco		W
		Joyce
		Kelley		C
		Larsen
		McLaughlin
		McManus
		Mickey Metayer		LW
		Moulaison
		Roche
		Rogers		LW/RW
		Toohey		RW
		Wakeham		D

== Standings ==
1947–48 NCAA Independent ice hockey standings
	Intercollegiate							Overall					
	GP	W	L	T	Pct.	GF	GA	GP	W	L	T	GF	GA
Army	16	11	4	1	.719	78	39	16	11	4	1	78	39
Bemidji State	5	0	5	0	.000	13	36	10	2	8	0	37	63
Boston College	19	14	5	0	.737	126	60	19	14	5	0	126	60
Boston University	24	20	4	0	.833	179	86	24	20	4	0	179	86
Bowdoin	9	4	5	0	.444	45	68	11	6	5	0	56	73
Brown	14	5	9	0	.357	61	91	14	5	9	0	61	91
California	10	2	8	0	.200	45	67	18	6	12	0	94	106
Clarkson	12	5	6	1	.458	67	39	17	10	6	1	96	54
Colby	8	2	6	0	.250	28	41	8	2	6	0	28	41
Colgate	10	7	3	0	.700	54	34	13	10	3	0	83	45
Colorado College	14	9	5	0	.643	84	73	27	19	8	0	207	120
Cornell	4	0	4	0	.000	3	43	4	0	4	0	3	43
Dartmouth	23	21	2	0	.913	156	76	24	21	3	0	156	81
Fort Devens State	13	3	10	0	.231	33	74	–	–	–	–	–	–
Georgetown	3	2	1	0	.667	12	11	7	5	2	0	37	21
Hamilton	–	–	–	–	–	–	–	14	7	7	0	–	–
Harvard	22	9	13	0	.409	131	131	23	9	14	0	135	140
Lehigh	9	0	9	0	.000	10	100	11	0	11	0	14	113
Massachusetts	2	0	2	0	.000	1	23	3	0	3	0	3	30
Michigan	18	16	2	0	.889	105	53	23	20	2	1	141	63
Michigan Tech	19	7	12	0	.368	87	96	20	8	12	0	91	97
Middlebury	14	8	5	1	.607	111	68	16	10	5	1	127	74
Minnesota	16	9	7	0	.563	78	73	21	9	12	0	100	105
Minnesota–Duluth	6	3	3	0	.500	21	24	9	6	3	0	36	28
MIT	19	8	11	0	.421	93	114	19	8	11	0	93	114
New Hampshire	13	4	9	0	.308	58	67	13	4	9	0	58	67
North Dakota	10	6	4	0	.600	51	46	16	11	5	0	103	68
North Dakota Agricultural	8	5	3	0	.571	43	33	8	5	3	0	43	33
Northeastern	19	10	9	0	.526	135	119	19	10	9	0	135	119
Norwich	9	3	6	0	.333	38	58	13	6	7	0	56	70
Princeton	18	8	10	0	.444	65	72	21	10	11	0	79	79
St. Cloud State	12	10	2	0	.833	55	35	16	12	4	0	73	55
St. Lawrence	9	6	3	0	.667	65	27	13	8	4	1	95	50
Suffolk	–	–	–	–	–	–	–	–	–	–	–	–	–
Tufts	4	3	1	0	.750	17	15	4	3	1	0	17	15
Union	9	1	8	0	.111	7	86	9	1	8	0	7	86
Williams	11	3	6	2	.364	37	47	13	4	7	2	–	–
Yale	16	5	10	1	.344	60	69	20	8	11	1	89	85

1947–48 New England Intercollegiate Hockey League standings
	Conference							Overall					
	GP	W	L	T	PTS	GF	GA	GP	W	L	T	GF	GA
Boston University †	13	12	1	0	.923	86	40	24	20	4	0	179	86
Boston College *	10	9	1	0	.900	77	29	19	14	5	0	126	60
Northeastern	14	8	6	0	.571	108	79	19	10	9	0	135	119
Bowdoin	6	3	3	0	.500	32	38	11	6	5	0	56	73
MIT	14	5	9	0	.357	62	87	19	8	11	0	93	114
Middlebury	6	2	4	0	.333	27	48	16	10	5	1	127	74
New Hampshire	10	3	7	0	.300	42	56	13	4	9	0	58	67
Norwich	7	2	5	0	.286	25	50	13	6	7	0	56	70
Fort Devens State	11	3	8	0	.273	30	55	–	–	–	–	–	–
Colby	5	1	4	0	.200	17	27	8	2	6	0	28	41
† indicates conference champion * indicates conference tournament champion

== Schedule and results ==
Note: due to the closure of the college in 1949, records for the team are incomplete. It's unknown if the team played any non-collegiate opponents but all games against fellow universities are represented here.

Date	Opponent	Site	Result	Record
Regular Season
December 8	at Boston University	Boston Arena • Boston, Massachusetts	L 1–10	0–1–0 (0–1–0)
December 9	at MIT	Boston Arena • Boston, Massachusetts	L 3–4	0–2–0 (0–2–0)
December 15	at Boston College	Boston Arena • Boston, Massachusetts	L 2–4	0–3–0 (0–3–0)
December 16	Northeastern	Skating Club of Boston Rink • Allston, Massachusetts	W 6–3	1–3–0 (1–3–0)
January 10	at Bowdoin	Delta Rink • Brunswick, Maine	W 4–3	2–3–0 (2–3–0)
January 13	Northeastern	Skating Club of Boston Rink • Allston, Massachusetts	L 1–8	2–4–0 (2–4–0)
January 19	vs. Brown*	Boston Arena • Boston, Massachusetts	L 1–2	2–5–0
January 20	at Boston University	Boston Arena • Boston, Massachusetts	L 3–6	2–6–0 (2–5–0)
February 2	at MIT	Boston Arena • Boston, Massachusetts	L 3–5	2–7–0 (2–6–0)
February 4	at Harvard*	Boston Arena • Boston, Massachusetts	L 2–17	2–8–0
February 7	at Norwich	Sabine Field Rink • Northfield, Vermont	L 2–3	2–9–0 (2–7–0)
February ?	Norwich	Skating Club of Boston Rink • Allston, Massachusetts	W 5–2	3–9–0 (3–7–0)
February 23	Boston College	Skating Club of Boston Rink • Allston, Massachusetts	L 0–7	3–10–0 (3–8–0)
*Non-conference game. ^{#}Rankings from USCHO.com Poll.
