= 1947–48 Army Cadets men's ice hockey season =

- Conference: 2nd Pentagonal League
- Home ice: Smith Rink

Record
- Overall: 11–4–1
- Conference: 2–2–0
- Home: 9–3–1
- Road: 2–1–0

Coaches and captains
- Head coach: Len Patten
- Captain: Arthur Snyder

The 1947–48 Army Cadets men's ice hockey season was the 45th season of play for the program but first under the oversight of the NCAA. The Cadets represented the United States Military Academy in the 1947–48 NCAA men's ice hockey season, played their home games at Smith Rink and were coached by Len Patten, in his 3rd season.

== Season ==
Army began the season with few expectations for its ice hockey program. While the Cadets were members of the Pentagonal League, they had gone winless against the other four members the year before and, as a result, only scheduled one game against their four other teams as opposed to the normal two. However, when the Cadets began their season they were performing better than they had in years.

After opening the season with a win, Army defeated Yale in what was considered to be a major upset. Army flagged a bit in their next match, losing to Colgate but then rallied to dominate in two shutout victories, albeit against inferior competition.

By the end of January Army was sitting with an enviable record with both of their close losses coming against strong foes. They travelled to Boston for just their second road game of the year and were humbled by Harvard to the tune of 1–7. The Cadets returned to West Point to lick their wounds and then took revenge against a hapless Lehigh squad, nearly equaling the 12–1 drubbing they had handed out the year before.

In Army's showdown with Dartmouth, the Cadets faced off against the top team in the nation. Though they lost the match, the fact that they were able to keep the score close indicated just how far they had come. The team finished out the season without another loss and were able to defeat Princeton to finish 3rd in the Pentagonal League. Army set a new program record for wins in a season and produced what was probably the best season in program history to that point.

== Roster ==
No.	Nat.	Player	Class	Pos	Height	Weight	DoB	Hometown	Previous team
	(United States)	Albert M. Austin	Junior	D			1927-03-20	Memphis, Tennessee	St. Paul's School
	(United States)	Donald A. Cerow	Senior	F			1925-02-11	Clayton, New York
	(United States)	Courtenay C. Davis Jr.	Junior				1926-06-18	Kenilworth, Illinois	Lawrenceville School
	(United States)	Patrick J. Donohoe	Junior	D			1927-07-06	Cleveland Heights, Ohio	St. Ignatius H.S.
	(United States)	Charles F. G. Kuyk Jr.	Sophomore	F			1926-07-28	Pawling, New York	Choate Rosemary Hall
	(United States)	Vincent P. Lewando	Senior				1926-07-17	Boston, Massachusetts	Boston Latin School
	(United States)	Louis LoConte Jr.	Senior				1926-09-13	Medford, Massachusetts	Medford H.S.
	(United States)	Raymond Moss	Junior	G			1926-05-07	Detroit, Michigan	Cass Tech H.S.
	(United States)	Wayne A. Norby	Junior				1927-01-13	Minneapolis, Minnesota	Minneapolis North H.S.
	(United States)	Walter B. Schlotterbeck	Senior				1922-12-16	Wakefield, Massachusetts	Norwich University
	(United States)	Arthur Snyder Jr. (C)	Senior	F			1925-02-06	Garden City, New York	Garden City H.S.

== Standings ==
1947–48 NCAA Independent ice hockey standings
	Intercollegiate							Overall					
	GP	W	L	T	Pct.	GF	GA	GP	W	L	T	GF	GA
Army	16	11	4	1	.719	78	39	16	11	4	1	78	39
Bemidji State	5	0	5	0	.000	13	36	10	2	8	0	37	63
Boston College	19	14	5	0	.737	126	60	19	14	5	0	126	60
Boston University	24	20	4	0	.833	179	86	24	20	4	0	179	86
Bowdoin	9	4	5	0	.444	45	68	11	6	5	0	56	73
Brown	14	5	9	0	.357	61	91	14	5	9	0	61	91
California	10	2	8	0	.200	45	67	18	6	12	0	94	106
Clarkson	12	5	6	1	.458	67	39	17	10	6	1	96	54
Colby	8	2	6	0	.250	28	41	8	2	6	0	28	41
Colgate	10	7	3	0	.700	54	34	13	10	3	0	83	45
Colorado College	14	9	5	0	.643	84	73	27	19	8	0	207	120
Cornell	4	0	4	0	.000	3	43	4	0	4	0	3	43
Dartmouth	23	21	2	0	.913	156	76	24	21	3	0	156	81
Fort Devens State	13	3	10	0	.231	33	74	–	–	–	–	–	–
Georgetown	3	2	1	0	.667	12	11	7	5	2	0	37	21
Hamilton	–	–	–	–	–	–	–	14	7	7	0	–	–
Harvard	22	9	13	0	.409	131	131	23	9	14	0	135	140
Lehigh	9	0	9	0	.000	10	100	11	0	11	0	14	113
Massachusetts	2	0	2	0	.000	1	23	3	0	3	0	3	30
Michigan	18	16	2	0	.889	105	53	23	20	2	1	141	63
Michigan Tech	19	7	12	0	.368	87	96	20	8	12	0	91	97
Middlebury	14	8	5	1	.607	111	68	16	10	5	1	127	74
Minnesota	16	9	7	0	.563	78	73	21	9	12	0	100	105
Minnesota–Duluth	6	3	3	0	.500	21	24	9	6	3	0	36	28
MIT	19	8	11	0	.421	93	114	19	8	11	0	93	114
New Hampshire	13	4	9	0	.308	58	67	13	4	9	0	58	67
North Dakota	10	6	4	0	.600	51	46	16	11	5	0	103	68
North Dakota Agricultural	8	5	3	0	.571	43	33	8	5	3	0	43	33
Northeastern	19	10	9	0	.526	135	119	19	10	9	0	135	119
Norwich	9	3	6	0	.333	38	58	13	6	7	0	56	70
Princeton	18	8	10	0	.444	65	72	21	10	11	0	79	79
St. Cloud State	12	10	2	0	.833	55	35	16	12	4	0	73	55
St. Lawrence	9	6	3	0	.667	65	27	13	8	4	1	95	50
Suffolk	–	–	–	–	–	–	–	–	–	–	–	–	–
Tufts	4	3	1	0	.750	17	15	4	3	1	0	17	15
Union	9	1	8	0	.111	7	86	9	1	8	0	7	86
Williams	11	3	6	2	.364	37	47	13	4	7	2	–	–
Yale	16	5	10	1	.344	60	69	20	8	11	1	89	85

1947–48 Pentagonal League standings
	Conference							Overall					
	GP	W	L	T	PTS	GF	GA	GP	W	L	T	GF	GA
Dartmouth †	7	7	0	0	1.000	49	20	24	21	3	0	156	81
Army	4	2	2	0	.500	12	17	16	11	4	1	78	39
Harvard	7	3	4	0	.429	31	33	23	9	14	0	135	140
Princeton	7	2	5	0	.286	23	31	21	10	11	0	79	79
Yale	7	2	5	0	.286	20	32	20	8	11	1	89	85
† indicates conference champion

== Schedule and results ==
Date	Opponent	Site	Result	Record
Regular Season
January 7	New Hampshire*	Smith Rink • West Point, New York	W 7–2	1–0–0
January 10	Yale	Smith Rink • West Point, New York	W 4–3	2–0–0 (1–0–0)
January 14	Colgate*	Smith Rink • West Point, New York	L 4–6	2–1–0
January 17	at Cornell*	Beebe Lake • Ithaca, New York	W 9–0	3–1–0
January 21	Vermont*	Smith Rink • West Point, New York	W 10–0	4–1–0
January 24	Brown*	Smith Rink • West Point, New York	W 3–2	5–1–0
January 30	Boston University*	Smith Rink • West Point, New York	L 3–4	5–2–0
January 31	St. Lawrence*	Smith Rink • West Point, New York	W 2–1 ^{OT}	6–2–0
February 7	at Harvard	Boston Arena • Boston, Massachusetts	L 1–7	6–3–0 (1–1–0)
February 15	Lehigh*	Smith Rink • West Point, New York	W 12–2	7–3–0
February 18	Massachusetts*	Smith Rink • West Point, New York	W 4–0	8–3–0
February 21	Dartmouth	Smith Rink • West Point, New York	L 2–5	8–4–0 (1–2–0)
February 25	Middlebury*	Smith Rink • West Point, New York	W 7–2	9–4–0
February 28	Williams*	Smith Rink • West Point, New York	T 2–2 ^{OT}	9–4–1
March 6	Clarkson*	Smith Rink • West Point, New York	W 3–1	10–4–1
March 13	at Princeton	Hobey Baker Memorial Rink • Princeton, New Jersey	W 5–2	11–4–1 (2–2–0)
*Non-conference game.
