= 1947–48 Colgate Red Raiders men's ice hockey season =

Intercollegiate hockey season

AAU, National Champion
- Conference: Independent
- Home ice: Taylor Lake

Record
- Overall: 10–3–0
- Home: 1–1–0
- Road: 6–0–0
- Neutral: 3–2–0

Coaches and captains
- Head coach: J. Howard Starr
- Assistant coaches: Gregg Batt
- Captain: Tom Dockrell

The 1947–48 Colgate Red Raiders men's ice hockey season was the 24th season of play for the program but first under the oversight of the NCAA. The Red Raiders represented the Colgate University and were coached by J. Howard Starr, in his 13th season.

== Season ==
At the start of the season, Colgate had to contend with the loss of its star goaltender as Mark Galloway accepted an invitation to try out for the US national team for the 1948 Olympics while on academic probation. While he was ultimately left off of the team, understudy Bill Taylor had to substitute in for the team's season-opening trip up to Buffalo. The three-game series began with Colgate losing to Princeton, snapping a 16-game winning streak for the Raiders. The second game was against Dartmouth, widely regarded as the best team in the country. Colgate had an addition problem as goaltending equipment failed to arrive in time and necessitated Lou Reycroft taking a turn in goal. Despite the problems, Colgate put forth a credible performance and kept the game close until the final period. The team reversed the trend in the final game of the trip and downed Williams 5–0.

Though Galloway may have missed out, Tommy Dockrell and Bruce Gardner were both invited to join the AAU team that travelled to St. Moritz. They would miss several games for the Red Raiders, however, the travelling was all for naught as the AAU squad would not be allowed to participate as there was a conflict with the AHA team. In the meantime, Colgate won games over three other New York schools and put themselves into position for a possible, if unlikely, NCAA tournament bid.

After returning from the exam break, Colgate lost the services of Herb Muther to graduation but saw Dockrell and Gardner return while Galloway was off of probation and now eligible to play once more. Colgate evened the season series with Princeton, however, they had the same trick inflicted upon them by Clarkson. After the loss, Colgate headed over to Ithaca and swamped Cornell, perhaps venting some of their frustration on the hapless Reds. After defeating Norwich in the final game of the regular season, Colgate was invited to participate at the AAU tournament in Buffalo. The Raiders ended up defeating three amateur clubs over a 25-hour span to win the championship.

== Roster ==
No.	Nat.	Player	Class	Pos	Height	Weight	DoB	Hometown	Previous team
		Douglas C. Alton		F			1920-09-21	Chicago, Illinois
		Thomas R. Dockrell (C)	Junior	F			1924-07-19	Stoneham, Massachusetts
		Mark G. Galloway		G			1921-10-16	Syracuse, New York
		Bruce D. Gardner		F			1925-01-20	Melrose, Massachusetts
		Frederic W. Gegenheimer	Sophomore	D				Brooklyn, New York
		Everette B. Jones	Sophomore	F				Rome, New York
		Frederick J. Kroll		F				Rome, New York
		William K. Mattoon		F			1923-05-12	Rome, New York
		Henry G. Pileckas		D			1922-05-17	Hagaman, New York
		Louis M. Raycroft Jr.		G/F			1926-11-26	Arlington, Massachusetts
		Philip N. Sanford Jr.	Junior	D				Medford, Massachusetts
		Donald J. Smith	Sophomore	F			1927-06-15	Rome, New York
		Williamsen H. Smith		F
		William P. Taylor Jr.		G				Buffalo, New York

== Standings ==
1947–48 NCAA Independent ice hockey standings
	Intercollegiate							Overall					
	GP	W	L	T	Pct.	GF	GA	GP	W	L	T	GF	GA
Army	16	11	4	1	.719	78	39	16	11	4	1	78	39
Bemidji State	5	0	5	0	.000	13	36	10	2	8	0	37	63
Boston College	19	14	5	0	.737	126	60	19	14	5	0	126	60
Boston University	24	20	4	0	.833	179	86	24	20	4	0	179	86
Bowdoin	9	4	5	0	.444	45	68	11	6	5	0	56	73
Brown	14	5	9	0	.357	61	91	14	5	9	0	61	91
California	10	2	8	0	.200	45	67	18	6	12	0	94	106
Clarkson	12	5	6	1	.458	67	39	17	10	6	1	96	54
Colby	8	2	6	0	.250	28	41	8	2	6	0	28	41
Colgate	10	7	3	0	.700	54	34	13	10	3	0	83	45
Colorado College	14	9	5	0	.643	84	73	27	19	8	0	207	120
Cornell	4	0	4	0	.000	3	43	4	0	4	0	3	43
Dartmouth	23	21	2	0	.913	156	76	24	21	3	0	156	81
Fort Devens State	13	3	10	0	.231	33	74	–	–	–	–	–	–
Georgetown	3	2	1	0	.667	12	11	7	5	2	0	37	21
Hamilton	–	–	–	–	–	–	–	14	7	7	0	–	–
Harvard	22	9	13	0	.409	131	131	23	9	14	0	135	140
Lehigh	9	0	9	0	.000	10	100	11	0	11	0	14	113
Massachusetts	2	0	2	0	.000	1	23	3	0	3	0	3	30
Michigan	18	16	2	0	.889	105	53	23	20	2	1	141	63
Michigan Tech	19	7	12	0	.368	87	96	20	8	12	0	91	97
Middlebury	14	8	5	1	.607	111	68	16	10	5	1	127	74
Minnesota	16	9	7	0	.563	78	73	21	9	12	0	100	105
Minnesota–Duluth	6	3	3	0	.500	21	24	9	6	3	0	36	28
MIT	19	8	11	0	.421	93	114	19	8	11	0	93	114
New Hampshire	13	4	9	0	.308	58	67	13	4	9	0	58	67
North Dakota	10	6	4	0	.600	51	46	16	11	5	0	103	68
North Dakota Agricultural	8	5	3	0	.571	43	33	8	5	3	0	43	33
Northeastern	19	10	9	0	.526	135	119	19	10	9	0	135	119
Norwich	9	3	6	0	.333	38	58	13	6	7	0	56	70
Princeton	18	8	10	0	.444	65	72	21	10	11	0	79	79
St. Cloud State	12	10	2	0	.833	55	35	16	12	4	0	73	55
St. Lawrence	9	6	3	0	.667	65	27	13	8	4	1	95	50
Suffolk	–	–	–	–	–	–	–	–	–	–	–	–	–
Tufts	4	3	1	0	.750	17	15	4	3	1	0	17	15
Union	9	1	8	0	.111	7	86	9	1	8	0	7	86
Williams	11	3	6	2	.364	37	47	13	4	7	2	–	–
Yale	16	5	10	1	.344	60	69	20	8	11	1	89	85

== Schedule and results ==
Date	Opponent	Site	Result	Record
Regular Season
December 29	vs. Princeton*	Buffalo Memorial Auditorium • Buffalo, New York	L 1–3	0–1–0
December 31	vs. Dartmouth*	Buffalo Memorial Auditorium • Buffalo, New York	L 2–6	0–2–0
January 4	vs. Williams*	Buffalo Memorial Auditorium • Buffalo, New York	W 5–0	1–2–0
January	at Army*	Smith Rink • West Point, New York	W 6–4	2–2–0
January 16	at St. Lawrence*	Clarkson Arena • Potsdam, New York	W 5–4	3–2–0
January	at Clarkson*	Clarkson Arena • Potsdam, New York	W 6–2	4–2–0
February 7	at Princeton*	Hobey Baker Memorial Rink • Princeton, New Jersey	W 5–4	5–2–0
February 12	Clarkson*	Taylor Lake • Hamilton, New York	L 4–5	5–3–0
February 21	Cornell*	Taylor Lake • Hamilton, New York	W 14–1	6–3–0
March 5	at Norwich*	Sabine Field Rink • Northfield, Vermont	W 6–5	7–3–0
National AAU Tournament
March 19	vs. Detroit Rangers*	Buffalo Memorial Auditorium • Buffalo, New York (AAU Game 1)	W 15–2	8–3–0
March 20	vs. Middlebury Hockey Club*	Buffalo Memorial Auditorium • Buffalo, New York (AAU Game 2)	W 7–5 ^{OT}	9–3–0
March 20	at Buffalo Holling Press*	Buffalo Memorial Auditorium • Buffalo, New York (AAU Game 3)	W 7–4	10–3–0
*Non-conference game.

Note: The two games against the Clinton Hockey Club appear in the school's records, however, they are not mentioned in contemporary accounts. Additionally, the AAU tournament games are missing from Colgate's records.

== Scoring statistics ==
Name	Position	Games	Goals	Assists	Points	PIM
Don Smith	F	-	12	8	20	-
Lou Reycroft	F	-	7	11	18	-
Tommy Dockrell	F	-	8	8	16	-
Bruce Gardner	F	-	6	8	14	-
Everette Jones	F	-	5	6	11	-
Fred Kroll	F	-	5	2	7	-
Hank Pileckas	F	-	3	3	6	-
Fred Gegenheimer	F	-	2	3	5	-
Phil Sanford	F	-	2	3	5	-
Bill Smith	F	-	3	0	3	-
Doug Alton	F	-	1	0	1	-
Bill Matoon	F	-	1	0	1	-
Bill Taylor	G	-	0	0	0	-
Mark Galloway	G	-	0	0	0	-
Total			55	52	107	-

Note: Colgate reported its players scoring 1 more goal than the team had for the season. Only scoring from the regular season are included.
