= 1947–48 Colby Mules men's ice hockey season =

- Conference: 10th NEIHL
- Home ice: South End Arena

Record
- Overall: 2–6–0
- Conference: 1–4–0
- Home: 0–2–0
- Road: 1–4–0
- Neutral: 1–0–0

Coaches and captains
- Head coach: Bill Millett
- Captain: Mike Collins

The 1947–48 Colby Mules men's ice hockey season was the 23rd season of play for the program but first under the oversight of the NCAA. The Mules represented Colby College and were coached by Bill Millett, in his 15th season.

== Season ==
Colby had a rather forgettable season. The team started out losing its first four games by wide margins. During those matches the team played well early on but a lack of reserve players caused the team to become fatigued while their opponents were able to utilize three, four or sometimes five different offensive line combinations. The Mules' first win came against a paltry Suffolk squad and saw the top line of Millett, Collins and Borah pot 6 goals, nearly doubling the team's totals themselves.

After earning their first conference win over MIT the team was riding a wave of optimism and played hard against Northeastern. The Mules jumped out to a 4–1 lead but, again due to a lack of depth, could only watch as the Huskies scored 6 goals in the final period to run away with the match. The final game against in-state rival Bowdoin followed a similar pattern with the Mules losing 4–7 once more.

Donald Choate served as team manager.

== Roster ==
No.	Nat.	Player	Class	Pos	Height	Weight	DoB	Hometown	Previous team
		Richard T. Borah	Sophomore	F				Providence, Rhode Island
		David W. Clark	Junior	F				Newton, Massachusetts
		Gordon "Mike" Collins	Senior	F
		Francis R. "Bud" Folino	Senior	D			1922-02-02	Boston, Massachusetts
		Robert J. Latham	Junior	F				Marblehead, Massachusetts
		Roy F. Leaf	Junior	D				Waltham, Massachusetts
		N. Ray Lindquist	Senior	F
		Robert E. Millett	Sophomore	F				Whitman, Massachusetts
		Alexander Richard	Junior					Madison, Maine
		John Spinner	Junior	G				Winthrop, Maine
		Paul K. Titus Jr.	Sophomore	D				Newburyport, Massachusetts

== Standings ==
1947–48 NCAA Independent ice hockey standings
	Intercollegiate							Overall					
	GP	W	L	T	Pct.	GF	GA	GP	W	L	T	GF	GA
Army	16	11	4	1	.719	78	39	16	11	4	1	78	39
Bemidji State	5	0	5	0	.000	13	36	10	2	8	0	37	63
Boston College	19	14	5	0	.737	126	60	19	14	5	0	126	60
Boston University	24	20	4	0	.833	179	86	24	20	4	0	179	86
Bowdoin	9	4	5	0	.444	45	68	11	6	5	0	56	73
Brown	14	5	9	0	.357	61	91	14	5	9	0	61	91
California	10	2	8	0	.200	45	67	18	6	12	0	94	106
Clarkson	12	5	6	1	.458	67	39	17	10	6	1	96	54
Colby	8	2	6	0	.250	28	41	8	2	6	0	28	41
Colgate	10	7	3	0	.700	54	34	13	10	3	0	83	45
Colorado College	14	9	5	0	.643	84	73	27	19	8	0	207	120
Cornell	4	0	4	0	.000	3	43	4	0	4	0	3	43
Dartmouth	23	21	2	0	.913	156	76	24	21	3	0	156	81
Fort Devens State	13	3	10	0	.231	33	74	–	–	–	–	–	–
Georgetown	3	2	1	0	.667	12	11	7	5	2	0	37	21
Hamilton	–	–	–	–	–	–	–	14	7	7	0	–	–
Harvard	22	9	13	0	.409	131	131	23	9	14	0	135	140
Lehigh	9	0	9	0	.000	10	100	11	0	11	0	14	113
Massachusetts	2	0	2	0	.000	1	23	3	0	3	0	3	30
Michigan	18	16	2	0	.889	105	53	23	20	2	1	141	63
Michigan Tech	19	7	12	0	.368	87	96	20	8	12	0	91	97
Middlebury	14	8	5	1	.607	111	68	16	10	5	1	127	74
Minnesota	16	9	7	0	.563	78	73	21	9	12	0	100	105
Minnesota–Duluth	6	3	3	0	.500	21	24	9	6	3	0	36	28
MIT	19	8	11	0	.421	93	114	19	8	11	0	93	114
New Hampshire	13	4	9	0	.308	58	67	13	4	9	0	58	67
North Dakota	10	6	4	0	.600	51	46	16	11	5	0	103	68
North Dakota Agricultural	8	5	3	0	.571	43	33	8	5	3	0	43	33
Northeastern	19	10	9	0	.526	135	119	19	10	9	0	135	119
Norwich	9	3	6	0	.333	38	58	13	6	7	0	56	70
Princeton	18	8	10	0	.444	65	72	21	10	11	0	79	79
St. Cloud State	12	10	2	0	.833	55	35	16	12	4	0	73	55
St. Lawrence	9	6	3	0	.667	65	27	13	8	4	1	95	50
Suffolk	–	–	–	–	–	–	–	–	–	–	–	–	–
Tufts	4	3	1	0	.750	17	15	4	3	1	0	17	15
Union	9	1	8	0	.111	7	86	9	1	8	0	7	86
Williams	11	3	6	2	.364	37	47	13	4	7	2	–	–
Yale	16	5	10	1	.344	60	69	20	8	11	1	89	85

1947–48 New England Intercollegiate Hockey League standings
	Conference							Overall					
	GP	W	L	T	PTS	GF	GA	GP	W	L	T	GF	GA
Boston University †	13	12	1	0	.923	86	40	24	20	4	0	179	86
Boston College *	10	9	1	0	.900	77	29	19	14	5	0	126	60
Northeastern	14	8	6	0	.571	108	79	19	10	9	0	135	119
Bowdoin	6	3	3	0	.500	32	38	11	6	5	0	56	73
MIT	14	5	9	0	.357	62	87	19	8	11	0	93	114
Middlebury	6	2	4	0	.333	27	48	16	10	5	1	127	74
New Hampshire	10	3	7	0	.300	42	56	13	4	9	0	58	67
Norwich	7	2	5	0	.286	25	50	13	6	7	0	56	70
Fort Devens State	11	3	8	0	.273	30	55	–	–	–	–	–	–
Colby	5	1	4	0	.200	17	27	8	2	6	0	28	41
† indicates conference champion * indicates conference tournament champion

== Schedule and results ==
Date	Opponent	Site	Result	Record
Regular Season
December 13	at Yale*	New Haven Arena • New Haven, Connecticut	L 3–7	0–1–0
January 7	Boston University	South End Arena • Waterville, Maine	L 0–5	0–2–0 (0–1–0)
January 10	Brown*	South End Arena • Waterville, Maine	L 0–7	0–3–0
January 12	at New Hampshire	UNH Ice Rink • Durham, New Hampshire	L 4–6	0–4–0 (0–2–0)
February 8	vs. Suffolk*	Boston Arena • Boston, Massachusetts	W 8–0	1–4–0
February 9	at MIT	Boston Arena • Boston, Massachusetts	W 5–2	2–4–0 (1–2–0)
February 10	at Northeastern	Boston Arena • Boston, Massachusetts	L 4–7	2–5–0 (1–3–0)
February 11	at Bowdoin	Delta Rink • Brunswick, Maine	L 4–7	2–6–0 (1–4–0)
*Non-conference game.
