= 1947–48 Lehigh Engineers men's ice hockey season =

- Conference: Independent
- Home ice: Albeth Ice Rink

Record
- Overall: 0–11–0
- Home: 0–3–0
- Road: 0–6–0
- Neutral: 0–2–0

Coaches and captains
- Head coach: Charles W. Simmons

The 1947–48 Lehigh Engineers men's ice hockey season was the 5th season of play for the program. The Engineers represented Lehigh University and were coached by Charles W. Simmons in his 5th season.

== Season ==
When Lehigh opened their season, they had agreed to participate in a 3-game tournament in Clinton, New York. Unfortunately, as most of the team were new additions who had only 4 practices to get used to one another, the Engineers performed rather poorly. After getting stomped by the hosts 3–17, the squad was throttled by Middlebury 0–22, setting numerous program records on both sides. While the results of the final match with Union were comparatively much better, the Dutchmen were very weak competition.

As if to drive the point home about just how much ground the Engineers had to make up, a further game with Hamilton shortly thereafter ended 0–15. In fact, Lehigh would be shutout in five consecutive games, an NCAA record (since broken), and would not score again until their meeting with Georgetown on February 14. After a further pair of lopsided losses, the Engineers played probably their best game of the season when they took on the Harrison Maple Leafs. While their comeback ultimately fell short, it was the closest the team came to a victory all year and showed that the offense did have some fight in them. To end their season, Lehigh lost 7-2 away to the Princeton Jayvee team on March 3rd.

== Roster ==
No.	Nat.	Player	Class	Pos	Height	Weight	DoB	Hometown	Previous team
		Carl C. Baldwin Jr.	Sophomore
		Fred Ball	Freshman	F
		Eugene t. Bernicker	Junior					Ventnor City, New Jersey
		Arthur B. Borgeson	Junior					Ridgewood, New Jersey
		Thomas M. Cashman	Sophomore	F
		Wallace C. Eisel						Mineola, New York
		Harris Gates	Freshman
		Carl R. Heineman	Junior					Absecon, New Jersey
		Robert W. Hundt	Junior					Forest Hills, New York
		Kluger		F
		Luke McKay		G
		Ogle
		Robert A. Phillips						Schenectady, New York
		C. Kenneth Rowntree	Junior
		Robert P. Sanborn Jr.	Sophomore	F
		Donald J. Wain	Sophomore	D
		Walter
		Watter

== Standings ==
1947–48 NCAA Independent ice hockey standings
	Intercollegiate							Overall					
	GP	W	L	T	Pct.	GF	GA	GP	W	L	T	GF	GA
Army	16	11	4	1	.719	78	39	16	11	4	1	78	39
Bemidji State	5	0	5	0	.000	13	36	10	2	8	0	37	63
Boston College	19	14	5	0	.737	126	60	19	14	5	0	126	60
Boston University	24	20	4	0	.833	179	86	24	20	4	0	179	86
Bowdoin	9	4	5	0	.444	45	68	11	6	5	0	56	73
Brown	14	5	9	0	.357	61	91	14	5	9	0	61	91
California	10	2	8	0	.200	45	67	18	6	12	0	94	106
Clarkson	12	5	6	1	.458	67	39	17	10	6	1	96	54
Colby	8	2	6	0	.250	28	41	8	2	6	0	28	41
Colgate	10	7	3	0	.700	54	34	13	10	3	0	83	45
Colorado College	14	9	5	0	.643	84	73	27	19	8	0	207	120
Cornell	4	0	4	0	.000	3	43	4	0	4	0	3	43
Dartmouth	23	21	2	0	.913	156	76	24	21	3	0	156	81
Fort Devens State	13	3	10	0	.231	33	74	–	–	–	–	–	–
Georgetown	3	2	1	0	.667	12	11	7	5	2	0	37	21
Hamilton	–	–	–	–	–	–	–	14	7	7	0	–	–
Harvard	22	9	13	0	.409	131	131	23	9	14	0	135	140
Lehigh	9	0	9	0	.000	10	100	11	0	11	0	14	113
Massachusetts	2	0	2	0	.000	1	23	3	0	3	0	3	30
Michigan	18	16	2	0	.889	105	53	23	20	2	1	141	63
Michigan Tech	19	7	12	0	.368	87	96	20	8	12	0	91	97
Middlebury	14	8	5	1	.607	111	68	16	10	5	1	127	74
Minnesota	16	9	7	0	.563	78	73	21	9	12	0	100	105
Minnesota–Duluth	6	3	3	0	.500	21	24	9	6	3	0	36	28
MIT	19	8	11	0	.421	93	114	19	8	11	0	93	114
New Hampshire	13	4	9	0	.308	58	67	13	4	9	0	58	67
North Dakota	10	6	4	0	.600	51	46	16	11	5	0	103	68
North Dakota Agricultural	8	5	3	0	.571	43	33	8	5	3	0	43	33
Northeastern	19	10	9	0	.526	135	119	19	10	9	0	135	119
Norwich	9	3	6	0	.333	38	58	13	6	7	0	56	70
Princeton	18	8	10	0	.444	65	72	21	10	11	0	79	79
St. Cloud State	12	10	2	0	.833	55	35	16	12	4	0	73	55
St. Lawrence	9	6	3	0	.667	65	27	13	8	4	1	95	50
Suffolk	–	–	–	–	–	–	–	–	–	–	–	–	–
Tufts	4	3	1	0	.750	17	15	4	3	1	0	17	15
Union	9	1	8	0	.111	7	86	9	1	8	0	7	86
Williams	11	3	6	2	.364	37	47	13	4	7	2	–	–
Yale	16	5	10	1	.344	60	69	20	8	11	1	89	85

== Schedule and results ==
Date	Opponent	Site	Result	Record
Silver Anniversary Hamilton Tournament
January 1	at Hamilton*	Russell Sage Rink • Clinton, New York (Silver Anniversary Game 1)	L 3–17	0–1–0
January 2	vs. Middlebury*	Russell Sage Rink • Clinton, New York (Silver Anniversary Game 2)	L 0–22	0–2–0
January 3	vs. Union*	Russell Sage Rink • Clinton, New York (Silver Anniversary Game 3)	L 0–3	0–3–0
Regular Season
January 10	at Hamilton*	Russell Sage Rink • Clinton, New York	L 0–15	0–4–0
January 17	New York A. C.*	Albeth Ice Rink • Allentown, Pennsylvania	L 0–8	0–5–0
February 7	Hamilton*	Albeth Ice Rink • Allentown, Pennsylvania	L 0–13	0–6–0
February 14	Georgetown*	Albeth Ice Rink • Allentown, Pennsylvania	L 2–4	0–7–0
February 15	at Army*	Smith Rink • West Point, New York	L 2–12	0–8–0
February 16	at Georgetown*	Uline Arena • Washington, D.C.	L 1–7	0–9–0
February 21	Harrison Maple Leafs*	Albeth Ice Rink • Allentown, Pennsylvania	L 4–5	0–10–0
March 3	at Princeton Jayvees*	Hobey Baker Memorial Rink • Princeton, New Jersey	L 2–7	0–11–0
*Non-conference game. ^{#}Rankings from USCHO.com Poll.

† Both Pennsylvania and Penn State fielded club teams at this time.
