= 1947–48 Bowdoin Polar Bears men's ice hockey season =

- Conference: 4th NEIHL
- Home ice: Delta Rink

Record
- Overall: 6–5–0
- Conference: 3–3–0
- Home: 5–3–0
- Road: 1–2–0

Coaches and captains
- Head coach: Danny MacFayden
- Captain: Ed Leason

The 1947–48 Bowdoin Polar Bears men's ice hockey season was the 25th season of play for the program but first under the oversight of the NCAA. The Polar Bears represented Bowdoin College and were coached by Daniel MacFayden, in his 2nd season.

== Season ==
Due to weather, games against New Hampshire and Colby were cancelled. Bowdoin finished 4th in the conference standings with a .500 record, however, because they played just 6 games against conference opponents, there was a question as to whether the Polar Bears would be selected to the NEIHL tournament. In the end, Bowdoin was selected to participate with the league's three powerhouses. The Bears played about as well as could be expected but were still woefully outmatched and fell to Boston College and Boston University in successive days by a combined 5–28 margin.

== Roster ==
No.	Nat.	Player	Class	Pos	Height	Weight	DoB	Hometown	Previous team
		Richard Archibald	Graduate	RW				Belmont, Massachusetts
		Robert E. Badger	Senior				1924-12-13
		Richard W. Blanchard	Freshman	C			1926-10-01	Winthrop, Maine
		Arthur R. Bonzagni	Sophomore				1926-01-26	Melrose, Massachusetts
		Phillip B. Burke	Senior	C				Worcester, Massachusetts
		William F. Clark	Senior					Winthrop, Massachusetts
		Robert B. Crockford	Sophomore				1927-04-16	East Foxborough, Massachusetts
		Henry F. Daley Jr.	Freshman					Cambridge, Massachusetts
		James B. Draper Jr.	Sophomore	G				Canton, Massachusetts
		Richard C. Field	Senior	RW			1925-07-14	Hudson, Massachusetts
		James L. Fife	Freshman	D				Arlington, Massachusetts
		Hansen
		Richard D. Haskell	Sophomore					Boston, Massachusetts
		Chester E. Homer Jr.	Freshman				1926-05-12	Newton Center, Massachusetts
		William D. Ireland Jr.	Senior	D			1924-03-20	Worcester, Massachusetts
		Edwin E. Leason Jr. (C)	Senior	LW			1924-01-09	Jamaica Plain, Massachusetts
		Lawrence D. Norton	Sophomore	G				Winchester, Massachusetts
		James R. Pierce	Graduate	LW				Rye, New York
		C. Carson Stanwood Jr.	Sophomore					Wellesley Hills, Massachusetts
		Chester L. Taylor	Freshman					Arlington, Massachusetts

== Standings ==
1947–48 NCAA Independent ice hockey standings
	Intercollegiate							Overall					
	GP	W	L	T	Pct.	GF	GA	GP	W	L	T	GF	GA
Army	16	11	4	1	.719	78	39	16	11	4	1	78	39
Bemidji State	5	0	5	0	.000	13	36	10	2	8	0	37	63
Boston College	19	14	5	0	.737	126	60	19	14	5	0	126	60
Boston University	24	20	4	0	.833	179	86	24	20	4	0	179	86
Bowdoin	9	4	5	0	.444	45	68	11	6	5	0	56	73
Brown	14	5	9	0	.357	61	91	14	5	9	0	61	91
California	10	2	8	0	.200	45	67	18	6	12	0	94	106
Clarkson	12	5	6	1	.458	67	39	17	10	6	1	96	54
Colby	8	2	6	0	.250	28	41	8	2	6	0	28	41
Colgate	10	7	3	0	.700	54	34	13	10	3	0	83	45
Colorado College	14	9	5	0	.643	84	73	27	19	8	0	207	120
Cornell	4	0	4	0	.000	3	43	4	0	4	0	3	43
Dartmouth	23	21	2	0	.913	156	76	24	21	3	0	156	81
Fort Devens State	13	3	10	0	.231	33	74	–	–	–	–	–	–
Georgetown	3	2	1	0	.667	12	11	7	5	2	0	37	21
Hamilton	–	–	–	–	–	–	–	14	7	7	0	–	–
Harvard	22	9	13	0	.409	131	131	23	9	14	0	135	140
Lehigh	9	0	9	0	.000	10	100	11	0	11	0	14	113
Massachusetts	2	0	2	0	.000	1	23	3	0	3	0	3	30
Michigan	18	16	2	0	.889	105	53	23	20	2	1	141	63
Michigan Tech	19	7	12	0	.368	87	96	20	8	12	0	91	97
Middlebury	14	8	5	1	.607	111	68	16	10	5	1	127	74
Minnesota	16	9	7	0	.563	78	73	21	9	12	0	100	105
Minnesota–Duluth	6	3	3	0	.500	21	24	9	6	3	0	36	28
MIT	19	8	11	0	.421	93	114	19	8	11	0	93	114
New Hampshire	13	4	9	0	.308	58	67	13	4	9	0	58	67
North Dakota	10	6	4	0	.600	51	46	16	11	5	0	103	68
North Dakota Agricultural	8	5	3	0	.571	43	33	8	5	3	0	43	33
Northeastern	19	10	9	0	.526	135	119	19	10	9	0	135	119
Norwich	9	3	6	0	.333	38	58	13	6	7	0	56	70
Princeton	18	8	10	0	.444	65	72	21	10	11	0	79	79
St. Cloud State	12	10	2	0	.833	55	35	16	12	4	0	73	55
St. Lawrence	9	6	3	0	.667	65	27	13	8	4	1	95	50
Suffolk	–	–	–	–	–	–	–	–	–	–	–	–	–
Tufts	4	3	1	0	.750	17	15	4	3	1	0	17	15
Union	9	1	8	0	.111	7	86	9	1	8	0	7	86
Williams	11	3	6	2	.364	37	47	13	4	7	2	–	–
Yale	16	5	10	1	.344	60	69	20	8	11	1	89	85

1947–48 New England Intercollegiate Hockey League standings
	Conference							Overall					
	GP	W	L	T	PTS	GF	GA	GP	W	L	T	GF	GA
Boston University †	13	12	1	0	.923	86	40	24	20	4	0	179	86
Boston College *	10	9	1	0	.900	77	29	19	14	5	0	126	60
Northeastern	14	8	6	0	.571	108	79	19	10	9	0	135	119
Bowdoin	6	3	3	0	.500	32	38	11	6	5	0	56	73
MIT	14	5	9	0	.357	62	87	19	8	11	0	93	114
Middlebury	6	2	4	0	.333	27	48	16	10	5	1	127	74
New Hampshire	10	3	7	0	.300	42	56	13	4	9	0	58	67
Norwich	7	2	5	0	.286	25	50	13	6	7	0	56	70
Fort Devens State	11	3	8	0	.273	30	55	–	–	–	–	–	–
Colby	5	1	4	0	.200	17	27	8	2	6	0	28	41
† indicates conference champion * indicates conference tournament champion

== Schedule and results ==
Date	Opponent	Site	Decision	Result	Record
Regular Season
January 6	New Auburn Legion*	Delta Rink • Brunswick, Maine	Draper	W 5–3	1–0–0
January 10	Fort Devens State	Delta Rink • Brunswick, Maine	Draper	L 3–4	1–1–0 (0–1–0)
January 14	New Hampshire	Delta Rink • Brunswick, Maine	Norton	W 6–5	2–1–0 (1–1–0)
January 16	MIT	Delta Rink • Brunswick, Maine	Draper	L 4–8	2–2–0 (1–2–0)
January 20	New Auburn Legion*	Delta Rink • Brunswick, Maine		W 6–1	3–2–0
January 22	Suffolk*	Delta Rink • Brunswick, Maine		W 8–3	4–2–0
February 11	Colby	Delta Rink • Brunswick, Maine	Norton	W 7–4	5–2–0 (2–2–0)
February 12	Northeastern	Delta Rink • Brunswick, Maine		L 4–12	5–3–0 (2–3–0)
February 16	at MIT	Boston Arena • Boston, Massachusetts	Draper	W 8–5	6–3–0 (3–3–0)
NEIHL Tournament
March 8	at Boston College*	Boston Arena • Boston, Massachusetts (NEIHL Semifinal)	Draper	L 1–10	6–4–0
March 9	at Boston University*	Boston Arena • Boston, Massachusetts (NEIHL Consolation)	Draper	L 4–18	6–5–0
*Non-conference game.

== Scoring statistics ==
Name	Position	Games	Goals	Assists	Points	PIM
Dick Archibald	RW	-	15	7	22	18
Dick Blanchard	C	-	6	9	15	0
Phil Burke	C	-	6	5	11	8
Ed Leason	RW	-	3	6	9	4
Jim Pierce	LW	-	5	3	8	20
Bill Ireland	D	-	4	3	7	20
Bob Crockford	F	-	4	3	7	4
Dick Field	LW	-	4	2	6	4
Jim Fife	D	-	2	4	6	28
Hank Daley	F	-	3	2	5	0
Dick Haskell	F	-	1	3	4	0
Art Bonzagni	F	-	2	1	3	16
Hansen	F	-	0	2	2	0
Carson Stanwood	F	-	1	0	1	8
Chet Taylor	F	-	0	1	1	8
Chet Homer	F	-	0	1	1	0
Bill Clark	F	-	0	0	0	4
Bob Badger	F	-	0	0	0	0
Jim Draper	G	-	0	0	0	0
Larry Norton	G	-	0	0	0	0
Total			56	52	108	142
