= 1947–48 MIT Engineers men's ice hockey season =

- Conference: 5th NEIHL
- Home ice: Boston Arena

Record
- Overall: 8–11–0
- Conference: 5–9–0
- Home: 3–4–0
- Road: 3–0–0
- Neutral: 2–7–0

Coaches and captains
- Head coach: Al Carvelli
- Captain: Jack Clifford

The 1947–48 MIT Engineers men's ice hockey season was the 45th season of play for the program but first under the oversight of the NCAA. The Engineers represent the Massachusetts Institute of Technology and were coached by Al Carvelli in his 2nd season.

== Season ==
MIT entered the season by putting together the most expansive slate of games in program history. The Engineers were scheduled to play 19 matches, 14 of which coming against NEIHL opponents. With most of the games being played at the Boston Arena, MIT could at least be assured that weather would not impact their season too severely.

The Beavers played their first match in early December but had to do so without two of their star players as both Ed Thompson and Don Lea were both injured. Without the standout forwards, MIT had to rely on its defense and team captain Jack Clifford led the way to a pair of victories after opening the year with a loss.

The following week, MIT was putting forth a tremendous performance against Northeastern despite missing three forwards. Don Lea was back in action and had paced the Engineers to a 4–2 lead. Unfortunately, he reinjured his twisted ankle in the second period while Tom Tsotsi was ejected after a fight. Short five regulars in the final period, MIT could not keep up the scoring pace and fell to the Huskies. The lack of offense was keenly felt in the next game when the Techmen were bowled over by Boston University 0–7. Lea fought through his injury and returned for the match against Boston College. He proved to be pivotal in the team attempted comeback after falling down 1–4 in the first. He scored twice to pull the Engineers into a tie with the vaunted Eagles but BC played a stingy brand of defense thereafter and managed to grind out two goals to capture the match.

After returning from the winter break, the Engineers had recovered from their various ailments and ice a full team for the first time that season. The result was a commanding victory over Suffolk with Clifford pacing all players with 7 points (4 g, 3 a). The offense got a bit too loose in the next game and, despite scoring 5 goals, missed the net with 50 attempts. The unconverted opportunities led to MIT's 4th-consecutive conference loss and put the Engineers in a nearly impossible position for making the NEIHL playoffs. To add injury to insult, Tsotsi was checked hard into the boards and was knocked unconscious for 20 minutes. He was sent to the Homberg Infirmary where he recovered.

The following week, MIT rallied to score two conference victories in convincing fashion. They followed that up with a win over Fort Devens State to lift them up to an even record. However, those would be the final games for captain Clifford as he graduated after the fall semester.

After returning from the break, the team felt Clifford's absence on both sides of the ice as neither the offense nor the defense were performing at the same level. The team knew it still needed to finish strong if it wanted to have a shot at the postseason berth, but losing the very next game to Bowdoin dealt a mortal blow to those chances. MIT's forwards were able to band together to overcome Clifford's loss; however, the defense was never able to fully recover and caused the Engineers to lose their last three conference matches. The defeats dropped MIT to 5th place, just 1 behind Bowdoin for the final playoff berth.

== Roster ==
| No. | Nat. | Player | Class | Pos | Height | Weight | DoB | Hometown | Previous team |
|---|---|---|---|---|---|---|---|---|---|
| | | Jack Adams | | G |
| | | George Aery | | F |
| | | Bradley | | F |
| | | John M. Clifford (C) | Senior | D |
| | | John Densmore | | D |
| | | Donald C. Lea | Sophomore | F | | | 1927-08-20 | Concord, New Hampshire |
| | | Theodore R. Madden | Junior | D | | | 1925-03-04 | Jamaica Plain, Massachusetts |
| | | Clint McKim | | F |
| | | Don Molino | | D |
| | | William T. Morris | Sophomore | F | | | 1928-11-12 | Concord, Massachusetts |
| | | Charles D. Nolan | Sophomore | F | | | 1926-10-29 | Saint Paul, Minnesota |
| | | Charlie Seifert | | F |
| | | Mike Tenney | | F |
| | | Ed Thompson | | F |
| | | Norm Tisdale | | F |
| | | Tom Tsotsi | | F |
| | | Gerard J. Walworth | Junior | F | | | 1926-06-30 | Arlington, Massachusetts |
| | | Bud Willard | | F |

== Standings ==
1947–48 NCAA Independent ice hockey standings
| | Intercollegiate | | | | | | | Overall | | | | | |
| | GP | W | L | T | Pct. | GF | GA | GP | W | L | T | GF | GA |
|---|---|---|---|---|---|---|---|---|---|---|---|---|---|
| Army | 16 | 11 | 4 | 1 | .719 | 78 | 39 | 16 | 11 | 4 | 1 | 78 | 39 |
| Bemidji State | 5 | 0 | 5 | 0 | .000 | 13 | 36 | 10 | 2 | 8 | 0 | 37 | 63 |
| Boston College | 19 | 14 | 5 | 0 | .737 | 126 | 60 | 19 | 14 | 5 | 0 | 126 | 60 |
| Boston University | 24 | 20 | 4 | 0 | .833 | 179 | 86 | 24 | 20 | 4 | 0 | 179 | 86 |
| Bowdoin | 9 | 4 | 5 | 0 | .444 | 45 | 68 | 11 | 6 | 5 | 0 | 56 | 73 |
| Brown | 14 | 5 | 9 | 0 | .357 | 61 | 91 | 14 | 5 | 9 | 0 | 61 | 91 |
| California | 10 | 2 | 8 | 0 | .200 | 45 | 67 | 18 | 6 | 12 | 0 | 94 | 106 |
| Clarkson | 12 | 5 | 6 | 1 | .458 | 67 | 39 | 17 | 10 | 6 | 1 | 96 | 54 |
| Colby | 8 | 2 | 6 | 0 | .250 | 28 | 41 | 8 | 2 | 6 | 0 | 28 | 41 |
| Colgate | 10 | 7 | 3 | 0 | .700 | 54 | 34 | 13 | 10 | 3 | 0 | 83 | 45 |
| Colorado College | 14 | 9 | 5 | 0 | .643 | 84 | 73 | 27 | 19 | 8 | 0 | 207 | 120 |
| Cornell | 4 | 0 | 4 | 0 | .000 | 3 | 43 | 4 | 0 | 4 | 0 | 3 | 43 |
| Dartmouth | 23 | 21 | 2 | 0 | .913 | 156 | 76 | 24 | 21 | 3 | 0 | 156 | 81 |
| Fort Devens State | 13 | 3 | 10 | 0 | .231 | 33 | 74 | – | – | – | – | – | – |
| Georgetown | 3 | 2 | 1 | 0 | .667 | 12 | 11 | 7 | 5 | 2 | 0 | 37 | 21 |
| Hamilton | – | – | – | – | – | – | – | 14 | 7 | 7 | 0 | – | – |
| Harvard | 22 | 9 | 13 | 0 | .409 | 131 | 131 | 23 | 9 | 14 | 0 | 135 | 140 |
| Lehigh | 9 | 0 | 9 | 0 | .000 | 10 | 100 | 11 | 0 | 11 | 0 | 14 | 113 |
| Massachusetts | 2 | 0 | 2 | 0 | .000 | 1 | 23 | 3 | 0 | 3 | 0 | 3 | 30 |
| Michigan | 18 | 16 | 2 | 0 | .889 | 105 | 53 | 23 | 20 | 2 | 1 | 141 | 63 |
| Michigan Tech | 19 | 7 | 12 | 0 | .368 | 87 | 96 | 20 | 8 | 12 | 0 | 91 | 97 |
| Middlebury | 14 | 8 | 5 | 1 | .607 | 111 | 68 | 16 | 10 | 5 | 1 | 127 | 74 |
| Minnesota | 16 | 9 | 7 | 0 | .563 | 78 | 73 | 21 | 9 | 12 | 0 | 100 | 105 |
| Minnesota–Duluth | 6 | 3 | 3 | 0 | .500 | 21 | 24 | 9 | 6 | 3 | 0 | 36 | 28 |
| MIT | 19 | 8 | 11 | 0 | .421 | 93 | 114 | 19 | 8 | 11 | 0 | 93 | 114 |
| New Hampshire | 13 | 4 | 9 | 0 | .308 | 58 | 67 | 13 | 4 | 9 | 0 | 58 | 67 |
| North Dakota | 10 | 6 | 4 | 0 | .600 | 51 | 46 | 16 | 11 | 5 | 0 | 103 | 68 |
| North Dakota Agricultural | 8 | 5 | 3 | 0 | .571 | 43 | 33 | 8 | 5 | 3 | 0 | 43 | 33 |
| Northeastern | 19 | 10 | 9 | 0 | .526 | 135 | 119 | 19 | 10 | 9 | 0 | 135 | 119 |
| Norwich | 9 | 3 | 6 | 0 | .333 | 38 | 58 | 13 | 6 | 7 | 0 | 56 | 70 |
| Princeton | 18 | 8 | 10 | 0 | .444 | 65 | 72 | 21 | 10 | 11 | 0 | 79 | 79 |
| St. Cloud State | 12 | 10 | 2 | 0 | .833 | 55 | 35 | 16 | 12 | 4 | 0 | 73 | 55 |
| St. Lawrence | 9 | 6 | 3 | 0 | .667 | 65 | 27 | 13 | 8 | 4 | 1 | 95 | 50 |
| Suffolk | – | – | – | – | – | – | – | – | – | – | – | – | – |
| Tufts | 4 | 3 | 1 | 0 | .750 | 17 | 15 | 4 | 3 | 1 | 0 | 17 | 15 |
| Union | 9 | 1 | 8 | 0 | .111 | 7 | 86 | 9 | 1 | 8 | 0 | 7 | 86 |
| Williams | 11 | 3 | 6 | 2 | .364 | 37 | 47 | 13 | 4 | 7 | 2 | – | – |
| Yale | 16 | 5 | 10 | 1 | .344 | 60 | 69 | 20 | 8 | 11 | 1 | 89 | 85 |

1947–48 New England Intercollegiate Hockey League standings
| | Conference | | | | | | | Overall | | | | | |
| | GP | W | L | T | PTS | GF | GA | GP | W | L | T | GF | GA |
|---|---|---|---|---|---|---|---|---|---|---|---|---|---|
| Boston University † | 13 | 12 | 1 | 0 | .923 | 86 | 40 | 24 | 20 | 4 | 0 | 179 | 86 |
| Boston College * | 10 | 9 | 1 | 0 | .900 | 77 | 29 | 19 | 14 | 5 | 0 | 126 | 60 |
| Northeastern | 14 | 8 | 6 | 0 | .571 | 108 | 79 | 19 | 10 | 9 | 0 | 135 | 119 |
| Bowdoin | 6 | 3 | 3 | 0 | .500 | 32 | 38 | 11 | 6 | 5 | 0 | 56 | 73 |
| MIT | 14 | 5 | 9 | 0 | .357 | 62 | 87 | 19 | 8 | 11 | 0 | 93 | 114 |
| Middlebury | 6 | 2 | 4 | 0 | .333 | 27 | 48 | 16 | 10 | 5 | 1 | 127 | 74 |
| New Hampshire | 10 | 3 | 7 | 0 | .300 | 42 | 56 | 13 | 4 | 9 | 0 | 58 | 67 |
| Norwich | 7 | 2 | 5 | 0 | .286 | 25 | 50 | 13 | 6 | 7 | 0 | 56 | 70 |
| Fort Devens State | 11 | 3 | 8 | 0 | .273 | 30 | 55 | – | – | – | – | – | – |
| Colby | 5 | 1 | 4 | 0 | .200 | 17 | 27 | 8 | 2 | 6 | 0 | 28 | 41 |
† indicates conference champion * indicates conference tournament champion

== Schedule and results ==
| Date | Opponent | Site | Result | Record |
Regular Season
| December 6 | vs. Boston University | Boston Arena • Boston, Massachusetts | L 5–10 | 0–1–0 (0–1–0) |
| December 8 | vs. Tufts* | Boston Arena • Boston, Massachusetts | W 7–3 | 1–1–0 |
| December 9 | Fort Devens State | Boston Arena • Boston, Massachusetts | W 4–3 | 2–1–0 (1–1–0) |
| December 15 | vs. Northeastern | Boston Arena • Boston, Massachusetts | L 4–6 | 2–2–0 (1–2–0) |
| December 16 | vs. Boston University | Boston Arena • Boston, Massachusetts | L 0–7 | 2–3–0 (1–3–0) |
| December 22 | vs. Boston College | Boston Arena • Boston, Massachusetts | L 5–10 | 2–4–0 (1–4–0) |
| January 11 | vs. Suffolk* | Boston Skating Club • Boston, Massachusetts | W 11–4 | 3–4–0 |
| January 13 | Middlebury | Boston Arena • Boston, Massachusetts | L 6–7 ^{OT} | 3–5–0 (1–5–0) |
| January 16 | at Bowdoin | Delta Rink • Brunswick, Maine | W 8–4 | 4–5–0 (2–5–0) |
| January 17 | at New Hampshire | UNH Ice Rink • Durham, New Hampshire | W 8–2 | 5–5–0 (3–5–0) |
| January 27 | vs. Tufts* | Boston Arena • Boston, Massachusetts | L 4–5 | 5–6–0 |
| February 2 | Fort Devens State | Boston Arena • Boston, Massachusetts | W 5–3 | 6–6–0 (4–5–0) |
| February 9 | Colby | Boston Arena • Boston, Massachusetts | L 2–5 | 6–7–0 (4–6–0) |
| February 10 | New Hampshire | Boston Arena • Boston, Massachusetts | W 4–3 | 7–7–0 (5–6–0) |
| February 11 | Brown* | Boston Arena • Boston, Massachusetts | L 2–9 | 7–8–0 |
| February 16 | Bowdoin | Boston Arena • Boston, Massachusetts | L 5–8 | 7–9–0 (5–7–0) |
| February 25 | at Brown* | Rhode Island Auditorium • Providence, Rhode Island | W 7–6 | 8–9–0 |
| February 27 | vs. Boston College | Boston Arena • Boston, Massachusetts | L 2–9 | 8–10–0 (5–8–0) |
| March 2 | vs. Northeastern | Boston Arena • Boston, Massachusetts | L 4–10 | 8–11–0 (5–9–0) |
*Non-conference game.
