= 1947–48 Norwich Cadets men's ice hockey season =

- Conference: 8th NEIHL
- Home ice: Sabine Field Rink

Record
- Overall: 6–7–0
- Conference: 2–5–0
- Home: 4–2–0
- Road: 2–5–0

Coaches and captains
- Head coach: Gerard Derosier
- Captain: Sterling Melendy

The 1947–48 Norwich Cadets men's ice hockey season was the 14th season of play for the program but first under the oversight of the NCAA. The Cadets represented Norwich University and were coached by Gerard Derosier in his 1st season.

== Season ==
Norwich entered the season with an ambitious 12-game schedule and a new head coach to lead the team. Boston University grad, Gerard Derosier took over the club and was looking to provide a bit of permanence for a program that had been playing off and on for the past 40 years. The biggest trouble early on was getting ice time as the Cadets still were relying on an outdoor rink. Fortunately, the weather consented to allowing the surface on Sabine Field to freeze in time for the opening match with Vermont. However, A lack of practice time led to the Cadets getting shutout despite inspired play from team captain Sterling Melendy.

The team was able to get in a significant amount of practice time over the next three weeks as they played just 2 more games in January. While Norwich lost both matched, the team was trending upwards and were finally able to get into the win column in the rematch with Vermont. The team took control of the game early and stayed ahead, eventually building a 7–2 lead. Vermont had a furious attempt to tie the game late but the Cadets were able to hold off their opponents for the victory.

After a second win, the team travelled south for a swing through Boston. The trip could have hardly started worse with a 6–18 defeat to Northeastern. While the two subsequent games were much closer, Norwich lost both matches and had no chance of making the conference postseason. Despite the futility of their situation, the team rallied once they got back home and reeled off four straight wins to bright themselves up to an even record. Though they were still well out of the NEIHL playoffs, the Cadets had a chance at a winning record if they could take down Colgate. The Red Raiders were one of the top teams that season but that didn't deter Norwich. The Cadets found themselves down 5–2 early in the third period before attempting to stage a comeback. Norwich scored three goals in the third, unfortunately the Red Raiders were able to slip one more past Switzer to escape with a win.

== Roster ==
No.	Nat.	Player	Class	Pos	Height	Weight	DoB	Hometown	Previous team
		Sam Adams		RW
		Finigan
		Louis Gomez						Barre, Vermont
		Janiak
		Richard Jordan		G				Medford, Massachusetts
		Dave Lamson		RW/D
		McIntire		C/LW
		McWilliams		LW
		Sterling Melendy (C)		C/LW
		Robert Reagan						Medford, Massachusetts
		Sweeney
		Dana Switzer		G
		Weiler		D
		Wharton		D
		Wheeler
		Richard Wilkins		LW/RW				Newton, Massachusetts
		Wright

== Standings ==
1947–48 NCAA Independent ice hockey standings
	Intercollegiate							Overall					
	GP	W	L	T	Pct.	GF	GA	GP	W	L	T	GF	GA
Army	16	11	4	1	.719	78	39	16	11	4	1	78	39
Bemidji State	5	0	5	0	.000	13	36	10	2	8	0	37	63
Boston College	19	14	5	0	.737	126	60	19	14	5	0	126	60
Boston University	24	20	4	0	.833	179	86	24	20	4	0	179	86
Bowdoin	9	4	5	0	.444	45	68	11	6	5	0	56	73
Brown	14	5	9	0	.357	61	91	14	5	9	0	61	91
California	10	2	8	0	.200	45	67	18	6	12	0	94	106
Clarkson	12	5	6	1	.458	67	39	17	10	6	1	96	54
Colby	8	2	6	0	.250	28	41	8	2	6	0	28	41
Colgate	10	7	3	0	.700	54	34	13	10	3	0	83	45
Colorado College	14	9	5	0	.643	84	73	27	19	8	0	207	120
Cornell	4	0	4	0	.000	3	43	4	0	4	0	3	43
Dartmouth	23	21	2	0	.913	156	76	24	21	3	0	156	81
Fort Devens State	13	3	10	0	.231	33	74	–	–	–	–	–	–
Georgetown	3	2	1	0	.667	12	11	7	5	2	0	37	21
Hamilton	–	–	–	–	–	–	–	14	7	7	0	–	–
Harvard	22	9	13	0	.409	131	131	23	9	14	0	135	140
Lehigh	9	0	9	0	.000	10	100	11	0	11	0	14	113
Massachusetts	2	0	2	0	.000	1	23	3	0	3	0	3	30
Michigan	18	16	2	0	.889	105	53	23	20	2	1	141	63
Michigan Tech	19	7	12	0	.368	87	96	20	8	12	0	91	97
Middlebury	14	8	5	1	.607	111	68	16	10	5	1	127	74
Minnesota	16	9	7	0	.563	78	73	21	9	12	0	100	105
Minnesota–Duluth	6	3	3	0	.500	21	24	9	6	3	0	36	28
MIT	19	8	11	0	.421	93	114	19	8	11	0	93	114
New Hampshire	13	4	9	0	.308	58	67	13	4	9	0	58	67
North Dakota	10	6	4	0	.600	51	46	16	11	5	0	103	68
North Dakota Agricultural	8	5	3	0	.571	43	33	8	5	3	0	43	33
Northeastern	19	10	9	0	.526	135	119	19	10	9	0	135	119
Norwich	9	3	6	0	.333	38	58	13	6	7	0	56	70
Princeton	18	8	10	0	.444	65	72	21	10	11	0	79	79
St. Cloud State	12	10	2	0	.833	55	35	16	12	4	0	73	55
St. Lawrence	9	6	3	0	.667	65	27	13	8	4	1	95	50
Suffolk	–	–	–	–	–	–	–	–	–	–	–	–	–
Tufts	4	3	1	0	.750	17	15	4	3	1	0	17	15
Union	9	1	8	0	.111	7	86	9	1	8	0	7	86
Williams	11	3	6	2	.364	37	47	13	4	7	2	–	–
Yale	16	5	10	1	.344	60	69	20	8	11	1	89	85

1947–48 New England Intercollegiate Hockey League standings
	Conference							Overall					
	GP	W	L	T	PTS	GF	GA	GP	W	L	T	GF	GA
Boston University †	13	12	1	0	.923	86	40	24	20	4	0	179	86
Boston College *	10	9	1	0	.900	77	29	19	14	5	0	126	60
Northeastern	14	8	6	0	.571	108	79	19	10	9	0	135	119
Bowdoin	6	3	3	0	.500	32	38	11	6	5	0	56	73
MIT	14	5	9	0	.357	62	87	19	8	11	0	93	114
Middlebury	6	2	4	0	.333	27	48	16	10	5	1	127	74
New Hampshire	10	3	7	0	.300	42	56	13	4	9	0	58	67
Norwich	7	2	5	0	.286	25	50	13	6	7	0	56	70
Fort Devens State	11	3	8	0	.273	30	55	–	–	–	–	–	–
Colby	5	1	4	0	.200	17	27	8	2	6	0	28	41
† indicates conference champion * indicates conference tournament champion

== Schedule and results ==
Date	Opponent	Site	Result	Record
Regular Season
January 10	Vermont ^{†}*	Sabine Field Rink • Northfield, Vermont	L 0–2	0–1–0
January 16	at Middlebury	McCullough Arena • Middlebury, Vermont	L 3–9	0–2–0 (0–1–0)
January 28	at New Hampshire	UNH Ice Rink • Durham, New Hampshire	L 5–7	0–3–0 (0–2–0)
February 4	at Vermont ^{†}*	Burlington, Vermont	W 7–5	1–3–0
February 7	Fort Devens State	Sabine Field Rink • Northfield, Vermont	W 3–2	2–3–0 (1–2–0)
February 9	at Northeastern	Boston Arena • Boston, Massachusetts	L 6–18	2–4–0 (1–3–0)
February 10	at Boston University	Boston Arena • Boston, Massachusetts	L 3–7	2–5–0 (1–4–0)
February	at Fort Devens State	Skating Club of Boston Rink • Allston, Massachusetts	L 2–5	2–6–0 (1–5–0)
February 13	Middlebury	Sabine Field Rink • Northfield, Vermont	W 3–2	3–6–0 (2–5–0)
February 24	Vermont ^{†}*	Sabine Field Rink • Northfield, Vermont	W 4–3	4–6–0
February 28	at Paul Smith's College*	Olympic Stadium • Lake Placid, New York	W 7–2	5–6–0
March 2	Saint Michael's*	Sabine Field Rink • Northfield, Vermont	W 6–2	6–6–0
March 5	Colgate*	Sabine Field Rink • Northfield, Vermont	L 5–6	6–7–0
*Non-conference game.

† Vermont fielded a club team at this time
Note: Some accounts have Norwich with a record of 7–7 for 1948, however, contemporary accounts have the team finishing on March 5 with a 6–7 record.
