= 1947–48 Williams Ephs men's ice hockey season =

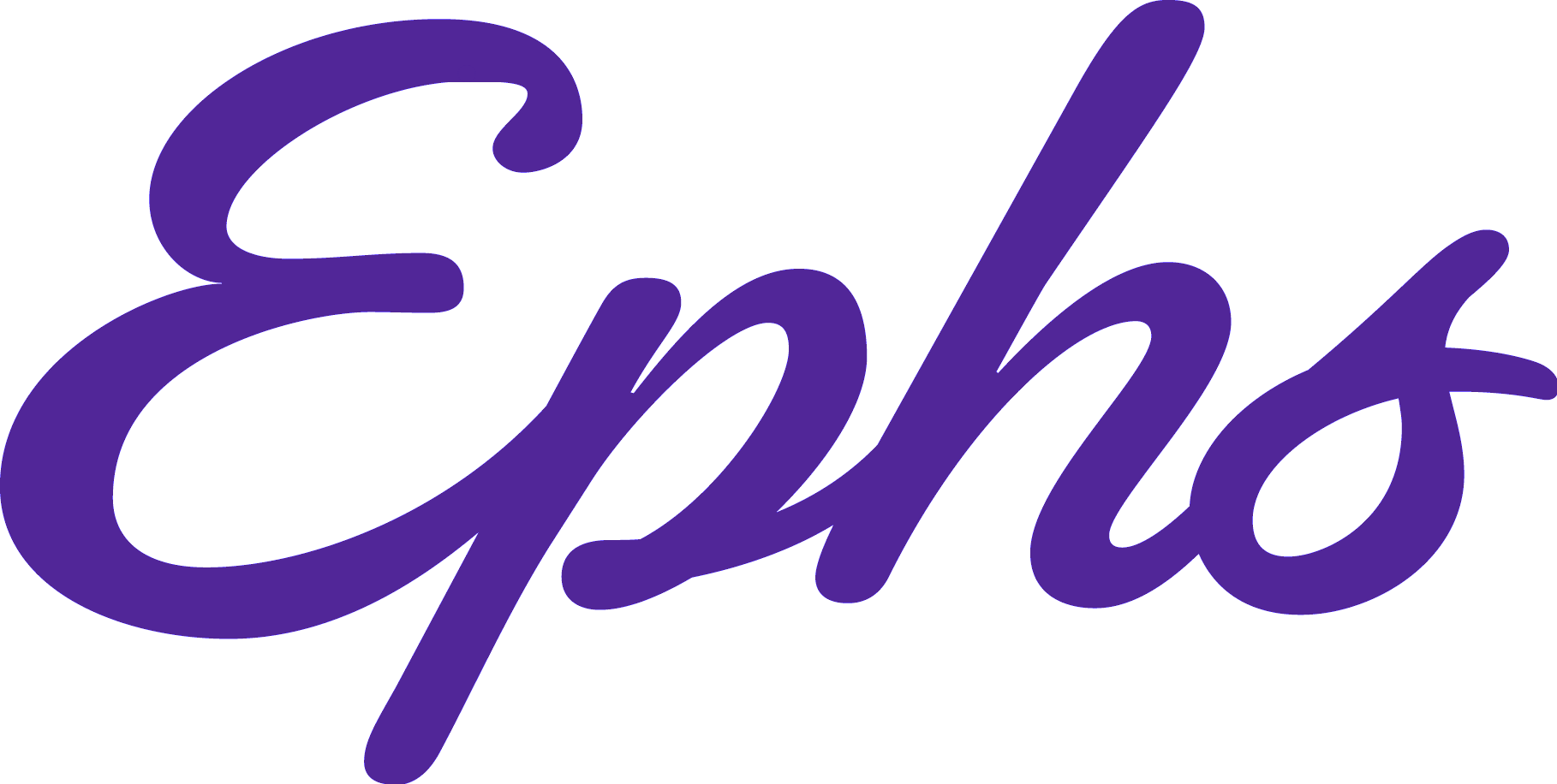
- Conference: Independent

Record

Coaches and captains
- Head coach: A. Barr Snively
- Captain: Charlie Huntington

The 1947–48 Williams Ephs men's ice hockey season was the 44th season of play for the program but 1st under NCAA oversight. The Ephs represented Williams College and were coached by A. Barr Snively in his 14th season.

== Season ==
Williams came into the season sporting a roster full of underclassmen. Much of the team was made up of sophomores and, which they did have some experience, many were still untested in the starting role. The weather got cold enough for the rink to form in mid-December and the team began training with gusto. Coach Snively tried to cram as much practice time in as possible before the winter break as the team would be travelling to Buffalo to take on three of the nation's top teams. Unfortunately, the Ephs weren't able to pull off an upset and were defeated in all three games. There were some outstanding performances in those losses as goaltender Dave Pynchon did well against a withering attack while the physical play from Don Radcliffe elicited cheers from the several-thousand-strong crowds. While the start to their season was inauspicious, Williams was able to turn the adversity to their advantage and use the experience to post stellar results for the rest of the season.

The team had a 10-day layoff before their next game and were able to iron out the deficiencies in their game. Entering the game against Hamilton, their opponents were coming off dominating performances and were expected to swamp the still winless Ephs. Instead, Williams swept the Continentals off of their home rink with six different players scoring. The strong play continued with an overpowering performance against Massachusetts. Goals continued to come from all quarters and even bit players were able to get their name on the scoresheet.

Unfortunately, the Ephs couldn't sustain that level of play and, after a tie with Middlebury, the team lost 4 games in a row. Williams recovered at the end of the season, first by deadlocking a strong Army squad but then by taking down Princeton on the road.

== Roster ==
No.	Nat.	Player	Class	Pos	Height	Weight	DoB	Hometown	Previous team
		Pete Andrews		G
		Tom Benson		RW
		Doug Coleman
		Tom Healy		C
		Pat Humphrey
		Charlie Huntington		LW
		Irwin
		Buck Marchese
		George Owen		D
		Dave Pynchon	Sophomore	G
		Don Radcliffe		D
		Mark Reynolds		F
		Dunc Roberts
		Chuck Schmidt
		Ed Spencer		D
		Bill Swan
		Bud Wilson

== Standings ==
1947–48 NCAA Independent ice hockey standings
	Intercollegiate							Overall					
	GP	W	L	T	Pct.	GF	GA	GP	W	L	T	GF	GA
Army	16	11	4	1	.719	78	39	16	11	4	1	78	39
Bemidji State	5	0	5	0	.000	13	36	10	2	8	0	37	63
Boston College	19	14	5	0	.737	126	60	19	14	5	0	126	60
Boston University	24	20	4	0	.833	179	86	24	20	4	0	179	86
Bowdoin	9	4	5	0	.444	45	68	11	6	5	0	56	73
Brown	14	5	9	0	.357	61	91	14	5	9	0	61	91
California	10	2	8	0	.200	45	67	18	6	12	0	94	106
Clarkson	12	5	6	1	.458	67	39	17	10	6	1	96	54
Colby	8	2	6	0	.250	28	41	8	2	6	0	28	41
Colgate	10	7	3	0	.700	54	34	13	10	3	0	83	45
Colorado College	14	9	5	0	.643	84	73	27	19	8	0	207	120
Cornell	4	0	4	0	.000	3	43	4	0	4	0	3	43
Dartmouth	23	21	2	0	.913	156	76	24	21	3	0	156	81
Fort Devens State	13	3	10	0	.231	33	74	–	–	–	–	–	–
Georgetown	3	2	1	0	.667	12	11	7	5	2	0	37	21
Hamilton	–	–	–	–	–	–	–	14	7	7	0	–	–
Harvard	22	9	13	0	.409	131	131	23	9	14	0	135	140
Lehigh	9	0	9	0	.000	10	100	11	0	11	0	14	113
Massachusetts	2	0	2	0	.000	1	23	3	0	3	0	3	30
Michigan	18	16	2	0	.889	105	53	23	20	2	1	141	63
Michigan Tech	19	7	12	0	.368	87	96	20	8	12	0	91	97
Middlebury	14	8	5	1	.607	111	68	16	10	5	1	127	74
Minnesota	16	9	7	0	.563	78	73	21	9	12	0	100	105
Minnesota–Duluth	6	3	3	0	.500	21	24	9	6	3	0	36	28
MIT	19	8	11	0	.421	93	114	19	8	11	0	93	114
New Hampshire	13	4	9	0	.308	58	67	13	4	9	0	58	67
North Dakota	10	6	4	0	.600	51	46	16	11	5	0	103	68
North Dakota Agricultural	8	5	3	0	.571	43	33	8	5	3	0	43	33
Northeastern	19	10	9	0	.526	135	119	19	10	9	0	135	119
Norwich	9	3	6	0	.333	38	58	13	6	7	0	56	70
Princeton	18	8	10	0	.444	65	72	21	10	11	0	79	79
St. Cloud State	12	10	2	0	.833	55	35	16	12	4	0	73	55
St. Lawrence	9	6	3	0	.667	65	27	13	8	4	1	95	50
Suffolk	–	–	–	–	–	–	–	–	–	–	–	–	–
Tufts	4	3	1	0	.750	17	15	4	3	1	0	17	15
Union	9	1	8	0	.111	7	86	9	1	8	0	7	86
Williams	11	3	6	2	.364	37	47	13	4	7	2	–	–
Yale	16	5	10	1	.344	60	69	20	8	11	1	89	85

== Schedule and results ==
Date	Opponent	Site	Result	Record
Regular Season
December 29	vs. Dartmouth*	Buffalo Memorial Auditorium • Buffalo, New York	L 1–7	0–1–0
December 31	vs. Princeton*	Buffalo Memorial Auditorium • Buffalo, New York	L 2–5	0–2–0
January 4	vs. Colgate*	Buffalo Memorial Auditorium • Buffalo, New York	L 0–5	0–3–0
January 14	Hamilton*	Cole Field House Pond • Williamstown, Massachusetts	W 7–0	1–3–0
January 17	Massachusetts*	Cole Field House Pond • Williamstown, Massachusetts	W 11–1	2–3–0
January 21	at Middlebury*	McCullough Arena • Middlebury, Vermont	T 6–6 ^{OT}	2–3–1
January 24	New York A. C.*	Cole Field House Pond • Williamstown, Massachusetts	L ?	2–4–1
January 30	St. Lawrence*	Cole Field House Pond • Williamstown, Massachusetts	L 3–5	2–5–1
February 21	Harvard*	Cole Field House Pond • Williamstown, Massachusetts	L 1–5	2–6–1
February 23	Dartmouth*	Cole Field House Pond • Williamstown, Massachusetts	L 1–9	2–7–1
February 28	at Army*	Smith Rink • West Point, New York	T 2–2 ^{OT}	2–7–2
March 1	at Princeton*	Hobey Baker Memorial Rink • Princeton, New Jersey	W 3–2	3–7–2
March 7	New York A. C.*	Cole Field House Pond • Williamstown, Massachusetts	W 4–1	4–7–2
*Non-conference game.
