= 1947–48 Michigan Tech Huskies men's ice hockey season =

Intercollegiate hockey season

- Conference: Independent
- Home ice: Dee Stadium

Record
- Overall: 8–12–0
- Home: 4–6–0
- Road: 4–6–0

Coaches and captains
- Head coach: Ed Maki

The 1947–48 Michigan Tech Huskies men's ice hockey season was the 27th season of play for the program but first under the oversight of the NCAA. The Huskies represented the Clarkson College of Technology and were coached by Ed Maki, in his 6th season.

== Roster ==
No.	Nat.	Player	Class	Pos	Height	Weight	DoB	Hometown	Previous team
		John Cortopassi
		Paul Kariniemi		F
		Ed Lohela
		Abbie Maki		D
		Al Maki		D
		Dick Noblet		D
		Jack Noblet		G
		Marc Olson		F
		Ted Olson
		Burt Petaja		F
		Bill Robertson		F
		Jimmy Ruhl

== Standings ==
1947–48 NCAA Independent ice hockey standings
	Intercollegiate							Overall					
	GP	W	L	T	Pct.	GF	GA	GP	W	L	T	GF	GA
Army	16	11	4	1	.719	78	39	16	11	4	1	78	39
Bemidji State	5	0	5	0	.000	13	36	10	2	8	0	37	63
Boston College	19	14	5	0	.737	126	60	19	14	5	0	126	60
Boston University	24	20	4	0	.833	179	86	24	20	4	0	179	86
Bowdoin	9	4	5	0	.444	45	68	11	6	5	0	56	73
Brown	14	5	9	0	.357	61	91	14	5	9	0	61	91
California	10	2	8	0	.200	45	67	18	6	12	0	94	106
Clarkson	12	5	6	1	.458	67	39	17	10	6	1	96	54
Colby	8	2	6	0	.250	28	41	8	2	6	0	28	41
Colgate	10	7	3	0	.700	54	34	13	10	3	0	83	45
Colorado College	14	9	5	0	.643	84	73	27	19	8	0	207	120
Cornell	4	0	4	0	.000	3	43	4	0	4	0	3	43
Dartmouth	23	21	2	0	.913	156	76	24	21	3	0	156	81
Fort Devens State	13	3	10	0	.231	33	74	–	–	–	–	–	–
Georgetown	3	2	1	0	.667	12	11	7	5	2	0	37	21
Hamilton	–	–	–	–	–	–	–	14	7	7	0	–	–
Harvard	22	9	13	0	.409	131	131	23	9	14	0	135	140
Lehigh	9	0	9	0	.000	10	100	11	0	11	0	14	113
Massachusetts	2	0	2	0	.000	1	23	3	0	3	0	3	30
Michigan	18	16	2	0	.889	105	53	23	20	2	1	141	63
Michigan Tech	19	7	12	0	.368	87	96	20	8	12	0	91	97
Middlebury	14	8	5	1	.607	111	68	16	10	5	1	127	74
Minnesota	16	9	7	0	.563	78	73	21	9	12	0	100	105
Minnesota–Duluth	6	3	3	0	.500	21	24	9	6	3	0	36	28
MIT	19	8	11	0	.421	93	114	19	8	11	0	93	114
New Hampshire	13	4	9	0	.308	58	67	13	4	9	0	58	67
North Dakota	10	6	4	0	.600	51	46	16	11	5	0	103	68
North Dakota Agricultural	8	5	3	0	.571	43	33	8	5	3	0	43	33
Northeastern	19	10	9	0	.526	135	119	19	10	9	0	135	119
Norwich	9	3	6	0	.333	38	58	13	6	7	0	56	70
Princeton	18	8	10	0	.444	65	72	21	10	11	0	79	79
St. Cloud State	12	10	2	0	.833	55	35	16	12	4	0	73	55
St. Lawrence	9	6	3	0	.667	65	27	13	8	4	1	95	50
Suffolk	–	–	–	–	–	–	–	–	–	–	–	–	–
Tufts	4	3	1	0	.750	17	15	4	3	1	0	17	15
Union	9	1	8	0	.111	7	86	9	1	8	0	7	86
Williams	11	3	6	2	.364	37	47	13	4	7	2	–	–
Yale	16	5	10	1	.344	60	69	20	8	11	1	89	85

== Schedule and results ==
Date	Opponent	Site	Result	Record
Regular Season
December 26	at Colorado College*	Broadmoor Ice Palace • Colorado Springs, Colorado	L 6–7	0–1–0
December 27	at Colorado College*	Broadmoor Ice Palace • Colorado Springs, Colorado	L 3–8	0–2–0
December 30	at California*	Berkeley Icelands • Berkeley, California	W 6–5	1–2–0
January 3	at San Francisco*	Winterland Arena • San Francisco, California	W 4–1	2–2–0
January 16	at North Dakota*	Winter Sports Building • Grand Forks, North Dakota	W 7–6	3–2–0
January 17	at North Dakota*	Winter Sports Building • Grand Forks, North Dakota	L 3–7	3–3–0
January 23	St. Cloud State*	Dee Stadium • Houghton, Michigan	W 9–1	4–3–0
January 24	St. Cloud State*	Dee Stadium • Houghton, Michigan	W 9–3	5–3–0
January 31	Michigan*	Dee Stadium • Houghton, Michigan	L 6–7	5–4–0
February 2	Michigan*	Dee Stadium • Houghton, Michigan	L 0–4	5–5–0
February 6	Minnesota*	Dee Stadium • Houghton, Michigan	L 5–6	5–6–0
February 7	Minnesota*	Dee Stadium • Houghton, Michigan	L 3–7	5–7–0
February 20	North Dakota*	Dee Stadium • Houghton, Michigan	L 4–5	5–8–0
February 21	North Dakota*	Dee Stadium • Houghton, Michigan	L 2–5	5–9–0
February 23	Colorado College*	Dee Stadium • Houghton, Michigan	W 4–0	6–9–0
February 24	Colorado College*	Dee Stadium • Houghton, Michigan	W 3–2	7–9–0
February 27	at Minnesota*	Minneapolis Arena • Minneapolis, Minnesota	L 4–7	7–10–0
February 28	at Minnesota*	Minneapolis Arena • Minneapolis, Minnesota	W 4–3	8–10–0
March 5	at Michigan*	Weinberg Coliseum • Ann Arbor, Michigan	L 4–7	8–11–0
March 6	at Michigan*	Weinberg Coliseum • Ann Arbor, Michigan	L 5–6	8–12–0
*Non-conference game.
