= 1947–48 Tufts Jumbos men's ice hockey season =

- Conference: Independent
- Home ice: Boston Arena

Record
- Overall: 3–1–0
- Home: 1–0–0
- Neutral: 2–1–0

Coaches and captains
- Head coach: Harry Briggs; Frank Anderson
- Captain(s): Bill Duryea; Dave Egan

The 1947–48 Tufts Jumbos men's ice hockey season was the 10th season of play for the program but 1st under NCAA oversight. The Jumbos represented Tufts College and were coached by Harry Briggs for the first three games before Frank Anderson took over for the final match.

== Season ==
Prior to the start of the season, the university's athletic association announced that there would not be an ice hockey team in 1948. Despite the news, Harry Briggs and the players from last year's squad organized on their own and arranged a limited schedule. The club arranged a date with MIT in early December and, despite having limited ice time and no access to the school's equipment, the team performed well in a loss with Joe Saunders being under siege all game. The refusal of the team to quietly disperse had attracted a contingent of some 350 students for the game and many more in the aftermath. The club petitioned the school for formal recognition and pressured the administration to allow them to wear the school colors.

In early January, the college president (Leonard Carmichael) and vice president (Richard Kelley) met with three representatives from the team; Charles Kerrigan, Roger Peck and Robert Harris. The players asked for the school to give formal recognition for the team and were told that, while the administration wasn't against the idea in principle, the issue at hand was where the team could play. Acting A.D. William S. Yeager had cancelled the team because, in his opinion, all teams representing the college should play their home games on campus. While this wasn't an issue with most programs, the fact that Tufts College did not have an on-campus ice rink meant that the team was forces to go elsewhere to play their games. Yeager believed that if the players were good enough to play ice hockey then they should attend a different school that featured the game. I the end, however, Yeager relented and dropped his opposition to the team. The school agreed to formally recognize the outfit but would not financially support the program.

In the meantime, the club had won two matches and were gearing up for a rematch with the Engineers. In the final game of the year, the team, now wearing official school sweaters, found themselves in trouble. After allowing two goals in the first, they allowed another pair in the first five minutes of the middle frame and were down 1–4. While everything appeared to being going the way of MIT, the Jumbos were able to turn the momentum in their favor with a power play goal before the midway point of the game. Just a few minutes later, Scooter Haines got the team's third goal and Tufts was suddenly down by just one goal. The Engineers hunkered down and kept the Jumbos back for several minutes but Dave Merrow managed to tie the score with just 25 seconds left in the period. Tufts kept MIT hemmed in their own end for most of the third and Peck was able to net the final goal of the game, giving the Jumbos a winning season and a perfect end to a tumultuous year.

Frank Anderson served as head coach for the final game, taking over from Harry Briggs after the winter break. Russell Brewer served as team manager.

== Roster ==
No.	Nat.	Player	Class	Pos	Height	Weight	DoB	Hometown	Previous team
20		William D. Duryea II (C)	Junior	F				Medford, Massachusetts
22		David M. Egan (C)	Sophomore	F				Arlington, Massachusetts
23		Richard Balcom	Sophomore	LW				Natick, Massachusetts
24		Roger P. Peck	Senior	C				Newton Highlands, Massachusetts	Newton High School (USHS-MA)
25		David Merrow	Freshman	RW				Winchester, Massachusetts
27		Irving W. Dingwell	Freshman					Winchester, Massachusetts
28		Walter L. McGill	Junior					Newton Center, Massachusetts
29		H McPhee		D
30		Kenneth Dixon		G
31		W. Scott Doub	Freshman					Winchester, Massachusetts
33		Charles H. Kerrigan	Senior	D				Manchester-by-the-Sea, Massachusetts	Stoneham High School (USHS-MA)
35		R. Miles Uhrig	Freshman	G				Lexington, Massachusetts
		Robert C. Haines	Junior	F				Medford, Massachusetts
		Charles A. Hutchings	Junior					Medford, Massachusetts
		McKinley
N/A		Carl F. "Joe" Saunders		G				Wakefield, Massachusetts

Note: The players wore different numbers while acting as an independent outfit. Saunders wore a sweater without a number.

== Standings ==
1947–48 NCAA Independent ice hockey standings
	Intercollegiate							Overall					
	GP	W	L	T	Pct.	GF	GA	GP	W	L	T	GF	GA
Army	16	11	4	1	.719	78	39	16	11	4	1	78	39
Bemidji State	5	0	5	0	.000	13	36	10	2	8	0	37	63
Boston College	19	14	5	0	.737	126	60	19	14	5	0	126	60
Boston University	24	20	4	0	.833	179	86	24	20	4	0	179	86
Bowdoin	9	4	5	0	.444	45	68	11	6	5	0	56	73
Brown	14	5	9	0	.357	61	91	14	5	9	0	61	91
California	10	2	8	0	.200	45	67	18	6	12	0	94	106
Clarkson	12	5	6	1	.458	67	39	17	10	6	1	96	54
Colby	8	2	6	0	.250	28	41	8	2	6	0	28	41
Colgate	10	7	3	0	.700	54	34	13	10	3	0	83	45
Colorado College	14	9	5	0	.643	84	73	27	19	8	0	207	120
Cornell	4	0	4	0	.000	3	43	4	0	4	0	3	43
Dartmouth	23	21	2	0	.913	156	76	24	21	3	0	156	81
Fort Devens State	13	3	10	0	.231	33	74	–	–	–	–	–	–
Georgetown	3	2	1	0	.667	12	11	7	5	2	0	37	21
Hamilton	–	–	–	–	–	–	–	14	7	7	0	–	–
Harvard	22	9	13	0	.409	131	131	23	9	14	0	135	140
Lehigh	9	0	9	0	.000	10	100	11	0	11	0	14	113
Massachusetts	2	0	2	0	.000	1	23	3	0	3	0	3	30
Michigan	18	16	2	0	.889	105	53	23	20	2	1	141	63
Michigan Tech	19	7	12	0	.368	87	96	20	8	12	0	91	97
Middlebury	14	8	5	1	.607	111	68	16	10	5	1	127	74
Minnesota	16	9	7	0	.563	78	73	21	9	12	0	100	105
Minnesota–Duluth	6	3	3	0	.500	21	24	9	6	3	0	36	28
MIT	19	8	11	0	.421	93	114	19	8	11	0	93	114
New Hampshire	13	4	9	0	.308	58	67	13	4	9	0	58	67
North Dakota	10	6	4	0	.600	51	46	16	11	5	0	103	68
North Dakota Agricultural	8	5	3	0	.571	43	33	8	5	3	0	43	33
Northeastern	19	10	9	0	.526	135	119	19	10	9	0	135	119
Norwich	9	3	6	0	.333	38	58	13	6	7	0	56	70
Princeton	18	8	10	0	.444	65	72	21	10	11	0	79	79
St. Cloud State	12	10	2	0	.833	55	35	16	12	4	0	73	55
St. Lawrence	9	6	3	0	.667	65	27	13	8	4	1	95	50
Suffolk	–	–	–	–	–	–	–	–	–	–	–	–	–
Tufts	4	3	1	0	.750	17	15	4	3	1	0	17	15
Union	9	1	8	0	.111	7	86	9	1	8	0	7	86
Williams	11	3	6	2	.364	37	47	13	4	7	2	–	–
Yale	16	5	10	1	.344	60	69	20	8	11	1	89	85

== Schedule and results ==
Date	Opponent	Site	Result	Record
Regular Season
December 8	vs. MIT*	Boston Arena • Boston, Massachusetts	L 3–7	0–1–0
December 22	Suffolk*	Boston Arena • Boston, Massachusetts	W 5–1	1–1–0
December	vs. Holy Cross ^{†}*	Boston Skating Club • Boston, Massachusetts	W 4–3	2–1–0
January 27	vs. MIT*	Boston Arena • Boston, Massachusetts	W 5–4	3–1–0
*Non-conference game.

† This was an informal club organized by students at Holy Cross College.

== Scoring statistics ==
Name	Position	Games	Goals	Assists	Points
Scooter Haines	F	-	4	1	-
Dick Balcom	F	-	2	3	-
Rog Peck	F	-	3	1	-
Dave Egan	F	-	3	1	-
Bill Duryea	F	-	2	2	-
Dave Merrow	F	-	3	0	-
Charley Kerrigan	D	-	-	-	-
Charlie Hutchings	D	-	-	-	-
H McPhee	D	-	-	-	-
Kenny Dixon	G	-	-	-	-
Miles Uhrig	G	-	-	-	-
Joe Saunders	G	-	-	-	-
Total			17		

Note: Assists were only reported in the middle two games.
