= 1947–48 Union Skating Dutchmen ice hockey season =

- Conference: Independent
- Home ice: Union Rink

Record
- Overall: 1–8–0
- Home: 0–3–0
- Road: 0–4–0
- Neutral: 1–1–0

Coaches and captains
- Head coach: Art Lawrence
- Captain: Francis Meehan

The 1947–48 Union Skating Dutchmen men's ice hockey season was the 30th season of play for the program but 1st under NCAA oversight. The Skating Dutchmen represented Union College and were coached by Art Lawrence in his 4th season.

== Season ==
Union took longer than most teams to return to the ice after World War II and reappeared just in time for the introduction of the NCAA tournament. The green team wasn't expected to win many of their games as they had to contend with a lack of consistent ice as the local rink was a temporary facility that was entirely at the mercy of local weather conditions. However, even with the inexperience and poor ice the team could hardly produce a worse season. Union was shutout in 6 of their games and lost by double digits on as many occasions.

There were some bright spots, particularly in the defensive play of Phil Brady, but that wasn't enough to help the team compete in many games. The situation with the rink got so bad at one point that the third period of the match with Champlain had to be divided into two 10-minute sessions so that both team had the ability to push the puck down a hill. While A.D. J. H. Wittner assured the team that the field upon which the rink was erected had been levelled off the previous spring, there was a definite tilt to the surface. The Dutchmen did show improve as the year went on and their final game was perhaps their best on the year. Despite losing to Champlain once more, the defense was stout all night long while the offense consistently attacked the opposing cage.

== Roster ==
No.	Nat.	Player	Class	Pos	Height	Weight	DoB	Hometown	Previous team
		Joseph Behan
		Don Boink
		Philip Brady		D				Buffalo, New York
		Rufus Burlingame		C			1920-09-27	Albany, New York
		Douglas Everett		D				Ridgewood, New Jersey
		Francis Meehan
		S. A. Miller
		A. Win Paige		LW
		Ollie Personecus		RW				Suffern, New York
		Richard Raymond
		Silverman
		Josh Titus		G				Glen Rock, New Jersey
		Bob Wisner
		Joe Young

== Standings ==
1947–48 NCAA Independent ice hockey standings
	Intercollegiate							Overall					
	GP	W	L	T	Pct.	GF	GA	GP	W	L	T	GF	GA
Army	16	11	4	1	.719	78	39	16	11	4	1	78	39
Bemidji State	5	0	5	0	.000	13	36	10	2	8	0	37	63
Boston College	19	14	5	0	.737	126	60	19	14	5	0	126	60
Boston University	24	20	4	0	.833	179	86	24	20	4	0	179	86
Bowdoin	9	4	5	0	.444	45	68	11	6	5	0	56	73
Brown	14	5	9	0	.357	61	91	14	5	9	0	61	91
California	10	2	8	0	.200	45	67	18	6	12	0	94	106
Clarkson	12	5	6	1	.458	67	39	17	10	6	1	96	54
Colby	8	2	6	0	.250	28	41	8	2	6	0	28	41
Colgate	10	7	3	0	.700	54	34	13	10	3	0	83	45
Colorado College	14	9	5	0	.643	84	73	27	19	8	0	207	120
Cornell	4	0	4	0	.000	3	43	4	0	4	0	3	43
Dartmouth	23	21	2	0	.913	156	76	24	21	3	0	156	81
Fort Devens State	13	3	10	0	.231	33	74	–	–	–	–	–	–
Georgetown	3	2	1	0	.667	12	11	7	5	2	0	37	21
Hamilton	–	–	–	–	–	–	–	14	7	7	0	–	–
Harvard	22	9	13	0	.409	131	131	23	9	14	0	135	140
Lehigh	9	0	9	0	.000	10	100	11	0	11	0	14	113
Massachusetts	2	0	2	0	.000	1	23	3	0	3	0	3	30
Michigan	18	16	2	0	.889	105	53	23	20	2	1	141	63
Michigan Tech	19	7	12	0	.368	87	96	20	8	12	0	91	97
Middlebury	14	8	5	1	.607	111	68	16	10	5	1	127	74
Minnesota	16	9	7	0	.563	78	73	21	9	12	0	100	105
Minnesota–Duluth	6	3	3	0	.500	21	24	9	6	3	0	36	28
MIT	19	8	11	0	.421	93	114	19	8	11	0	93	114
New Hampshire	13	4	9	0	.308	58	67	13	4	9	0	58	67
North Dakota	10	6	4	0	.600	51	46	16	11	5	0	103	68
North Dakota Agricultural	8	5	3	0	.571	43	33	8	5	3	0	43	33
Northeastern	19	10	9	0	.526	135	119	19	10	9	0	135	119
Norwich	9	3	6	0	.333	38	58	13	6	7	0	56	70
Princeton	18	8	10	0	.444	65	72	21	10	11	0	79	79
St. Cloud State	12	10	2	0	.833	55	35	16	12	4	0	73	55
St. Lawrence	9	6	3	0	.667	65	27	13	8	4	1	95	50
Suffolk	–	–	–	–	–	–	–	–	–	–	–	–	–
Tufts	4	3	1	0	.750	17	15	4	3	1	0	17	15
Union	9	1	8	0	.111	7	86	9	1	8	0	7	86
Williams	11	3	6	2	.364	37	47	13	4	7	2	–	–
Yale	16	5	10	1	.344	60	69	20	8	11	1	89	85

== Schedule and results ==
Date	Opponent	Site	Result	Record
Silver Anniversary Hamilton Tournament
January 1	vs. Middlebury*	Russell Sage Rink • Clinton, New York (Game 1)	L 0–17	0–1–0
January 2	at Hamilton*	Russell Sage Rink • Clinton, New York (Game 2)	L 0–10	0–2–0
January 3	vs. Lehigh*	Russell Sage Rink • Clinton, New York (Game 3)	W 3–0	1–2–0
Regular Season
January 24	at Hamilton*	Russell Sage Rink • Clinton, New York	L 0–16	1–3–0
January 28	Middlebury*	Union Rink • Schenectady, New York	L 0–14	1–4–0
February 2	St. Lawrence*	Union Rink • Schenectady, New York	L 0–17	1–5–0
February 7	Champlain*	Union Rink • Schenectady, New York	L 2–5	1–6–0
February 12	at Middlebury*	McCullough Arena • Middlebury, Vermont	L 2–16	1–7–0
February 21	at Champlain*	Plattsburgh, New York	L 0–1	1–8–0
*Non-conference game.
