= 1947–48 Cornell Big Red men's ice hockey season =

Intercollegiate hockey season

- Home ice: Beebe Lake

Record
- Overall: 0–4–0
- Home: 0–1–0
- Road: 0–3–0

Coaches and captains
- Head coach: Bud Boeringer
- Captain: Irving Holcomb

The 1947–48 Cornell Big Red men's ice hockey season was the 41st season of play for the program. The team was coached by Bud Boeringer in his 1st season.

== Season ==
In the first season for the Big Red without Nick Bawlf in 32 years, the team had a dismal performance. The hope for the season was quickly quashed in the first game when Army trounced the nearly all-sophomore Cornell squad to the tune of 0–9. The team didn't get much better as the year went on; after a second shutout loss the following weekend, Cornell had to wait on the sidelines for four weeks before they were able to play their third match.

The team, as it had since 1942, could only manage 4 contests on the year. For the third time in four years, they lost every one. To make matters worse, they weren't even competitive in any of their games, with the closest score being 2–10. The lack of practice time due to still using Lake Beebe as their primary surface was just too great an obstacle to overcome. This was also the first year that the NCAA sponsored ice hockey, which meant that the sport was becoming much more than just a fad for some schools.

After the year, with no chance to improve the program's fortunes on the horizon, Cornell decided to shelve the ice hockey team. In the decade afterwards, the flame for the program was kept alive long enough for the school to secure funding for the first on-campus rink. Completed in 1957, the Lynah Rink enabled Cornell to return to the ice and keep the tradition alive for the Big Red.

== Roster ==
No.	Nat.	Player	Class	Pos	Height	Weight	DoB	Hometown	Previous team
		Dave Batt		LW
		John Brady		G
		Dick Coffin		D
		Hank Drost		D
		Buck Ellis		D
		Ted Eskild		F
		Irving Holcomb (C)		C
		Joe Louis		RW

== Standings ==
1947–48 NCAA Independent ice hockey standings
	Intercollegiate							Overall					
	GP	W	L	T	Pct.	GF	GA	GP	W	L	T	GF	GA
Army	16	11	4	1	.719	78	39	16	11	4	1	78	39
Bemidji State	5	0	5	0	.000	13	36	10	2	8	0	37	63
Boston College	19	14	5	0	.737	126	60	19	14	5	0	126	60
Boston University	24	20	4	0	.833	179	86	24	20	4	0	179	86
Bowdoin	9	4	5	0	.444	45	68	11	6	5	0	56	73
Brown	14	5	9	0	.357	61	91	14	5	9	0	61	91
California	10	2	8	0	.200	45	67	18	6	12	0	94	106
Clarkson	12	5	6	1	.458	67	39	17	10	6	1	96	54
Colby	8	2	6	0	.250	28	41	8	2	6	0	28	41
Colgate	10	7	3	0	.700	54	34	13	10	3	0	83	45
Colorado College	14	9	5	0	.643	84	73	27	19	8	0	207	120
Cornell	4	0	4	0	.000	3	43	4	0	4	0	3	43
Dartmouth	23	21	2	0	.913	156	76	24	21	3	0	156	81
Fort Devens State	13	3	10	0	.231	33	74	–	–	–	–	–	–
Georgetown	3	2	1	0	.667	12	11	7	5	2	0	37	21
Hamilton	–	–	–	–	–	–	–	14	7	7	0	–	–
Harvard	22	9	13	0	.409	131	131	23	9	14	0	135	140
Lehigh	9	0	9	0	.000	10	100	11	0	11	0	14	113
Massachusetts	2	0	2	0	.000	1	23	3	0	3	0	3	30
Michigan	18	16	2	0	.889	105	53	23	20	2	1	141	63
Michigan Tech	19	7	12	0	.368	87	96	20	8	12	0	91	97
Middlebury	14	8	5	1	.607	111	68	16	10	5	1	127	74
Minnesota	16	9	7	0	.563	78	73	21	9	12	0	100	105
Minnesota–Duluth	6	3	3	0	.500	21	24	9	6	3	0	36	28
MIT	19	8	11	0	.421	93	114	19	8	11	0	93	114
New Hampshire	13	4	9	0	.308	58	67	13	4	9	0	58	67
North Dakota	10	6	4	0	.600	51	46	16	11	5	0	103	68
North Dakota Agricultural	8	5	3	0	.571	43	33	8	5	3	0	43	33
Northeastern	19	10	9	0	.526	135	119	19	10	9	0	135	119
Norwich	9	3	6	0	.333	38	58	13	6	7	0	56	70
Princeton	18	8	10	0	.444	65	72	21	10	11	0	79	79
St. Cloud State	12	10	2	0	.833	55	35	16	12	4	0	73	55
St. Lawrence	9	6	3	0	.667	65	27	13	8	4	1	95	50
Suffolk	–	–	–	–	–	–	–	–	–	–	–	–	–
Tufts	4	3	1	0	.750	17	15	4	3	1	0	17	15
Union	9	1	8	0	.111	7	86	9	1	8	0	7	86
Williams	11	3	6	2	.364	37	47	13	4	7	2	–	–
Yale	16	5	10	1	.344	60	69	20	8	11	1	89	85

== Schedule and results ==
Date	Opponent	Site	Result	Record
Regular season
January 17	Army*	Beebe Lake • Ithaca, New York	L 0–9	0–1–0
January 24	at Clarkson*	Clarkson Arena • Potsdam, New York	L 0–10	0–2–0
February 21	at Colgate*	Hamilton, New York	L 1–14	0–3–0
February ?	at Hamilton*	Russell Sage Rink • Clinton, New York	L 2–10	0–4–0
*Non-conference game.
