= 1947–48 UMass Aggies men's ice hockey season =

- Conference: Independent
- Home ice: Fernald Hall Rink

Record
- Overall: 0–3–0
- Road: 0–3–0

Coaches and captains
- Head coach: Thomas Filmore
- Captain: none

The 1947–48 UMass Aggies men's ice hockey season was the 32nd season of play for the program but first under the oversight of the NCAA. The Aggies represented the University of Massachusetts Amherst and were coached by Thomas Filmore, in his 1st season.

== Season ==
The newly renamed University of Massachusetts Amherst decided to revive its ice hockey program after laying dormant since 1939. To support the team, a temporary rink was built behind Fernald Hall and ex-pro player Thomas Filmore was brought in helm the team. Despite their best intentions, the program had to deal with some significant hurdles. Not least of which were that virtually none of the players had played college hockey before. Additionally, because they had started putting their schedule together so late in the school year, the Aggies had trouble getting other teams on their slate. However, the biggest issue was probably the lack of practice facilities. While the Fernald Hall Rink had been built in earnest, weather conditions rendered it unsuitable for long swaths of time. UMass was able to schedule six games, however, half of those were cancelled. After the first game on January 6 was scrapped, the team played a pair of contest just before the exam break and a third upon return. With the very poor play exhibited by the Aggies and no usable practice facilities to improve, the school decided to end the season early and hope for better conditions next year.

== Roster ==
No.	Nat.	Player	Class	Pos	Height	Weight	DoB	Hometown	Previous team
		John L. Baier	Junior	F			1924-04-24	Providence, Rhode Island
		Lawrence H. Couture	Sophomore	D			1916-09-30	Hampden, Massachusetts
		Rolf O. Gullans	Sophomore	F				Springfield, Massachusetts
		Allen H. Keough	Sophomore				1929-04-24	Chelsea, Massachusetts
		Joseph Lit	Sophomore					Boston, Massachusetts	Fort Devens State
		Walter P. Maisner	Sophomore				1925-07-13	Shutesbury, Massachusetts
		Ralph P. Marble Jr.	Sophomore	D			1926-04-26	Farmington, Michigan
		Edwin A. Paul	Sophomore				1924-09-10	Boston, Massachusetts
		Abbott F. Reid	Junior	F				Beverly, Massachusetts	Dartmouth
		George L. Sundstrom	Sophomore	G				Chicopee, Massachusetts
		William D. Sweeney	Sophomore	G			1925-01-21	Brockton, Massachusetts
		Robert W. Tetrault	Junior
		Donald E. Westcott	Sophomore	F				Springfield, Massachusetts
		Arthur F. White Jr.	Senior	F			1921-02-22	Worcester, Massachusetts
		Charles J. White	Junior	D				Worcester, Massachusetts

== Standings ==
1947–48 NCAA Independent ice hockey standings
	Intercollegiate							Overall					
	GP	W	L	T	Pct.	GF	GA	GP	W	L	T	GF	GA
Army	16	11	4	1	.719	78	39	16	11	4	1	78	39
Bemidji State	5	0	5	0	.000	13	36	10	2	8	0	37	63
Boston College	19	14	5	0	.737	126	60	19	14	5	0	126	60
Boston University	24	20	4	0	.833	179	86	24	20	4	0	179	86
Bowdoin	9	4	5	0	.444	45	68	11	6	5	0	56	73
Brown	14	5	9	0	.357	61	91	14	5	9	0	61	91
California	10	2	8	0	.200	45	67	18	6	12	0	94	106
Clarkson	12	5	6	1	.458	67	39	17	10	6	1	96	54
Colby	8	2	6	0	.250	28	41	8	2	6	0	28	41
Colgate	10	7	3	0	.700	54	34	13	10	3	0	83	45
Colorado College	14	9	5	0	.643	84	73	27	19	8	0	207	120
Cornell	4	0	4	0	.000	3	43	4	0	4	0	3	43
Dartmouth	23	21	2	0	.913	156	76	24	21	3	0	156	81
Fort Devens State	13	3	10	0	.231	33	74	–	–	–	–	–	–
Georgetown	3	2	1	0	.667	12	11	7	5	2	0	37	21
Hamilton	–	–	–	–	–	–	–	14	7	7	0	–	–
Harvard	22	9	13	0	.409	131	131	23	9	14	0	135	140
Lehigh	9	0	9	0	.000	10	100	11	0	11	0	14	113
Massachusetts	2	0	2	0	.000	1	23	3	0	3	0	3	30
Michigan	18	16	2	0	.889	105	53	23	20	2	1	141	63
Michigan Tech	19	7	12	0	.368	87	96	20	8	12	0	91	97
Middlebury	14	8	5	1	.607	111	68	16	10	5	1	127	74
Minnesota	16	9	7	0	.563	78	73	21	9	12	0	100	105
Minnesota–Duluth	6	3	3	0	.500	21	24	9	6	3	0	36	28
MIT	19	8	11	0	.421	93	114	19	8	11	0	93	114
New Hampshire	13	4	9	0	.308	58	67	13	4	9	0	58	67
North Dakota	10	6	4	0	.600	51	46	16	11	5	0	103	68
North Dakota Agricultural	8	5	3	0	.571	43	33	8	5	3	0	43	33
Northeastern	19	10	9	0	.526	135	119	19	10	9	0	135	119
Norwich	9	3	6	0	.333	38	58	13	6	7	0	56	70
Princeton	18	8	10	0	.444	65	72	21	10	11	0	79	79
St. Cloud State	12	10	2	0	.833	55	35	16	12	4	0	73	55
St. Lawrence	9	6	3	0	.667	65	27	13	8	4	1	95	50
Suffolk	–	–	–	–	–	–	–	–	–	–	–	–	–
Tufts	4	3	1	0	.750	17	15	4	3	1	0	17	15
Union	9	1	8	0	.111	7	86	9	1	8	0	7	86
Williams	11	3	6	2	.364	37	47	13	4	7	2	–	–
Yale	16	5	10	1	.344	60	69	20	8	11	1	89	85

== Schedule and results ==
Date	Opponent	Site	Result	Record
Regular Season
January 17	at Williams*	Cole Field House Rink • Williamstown, Massachusetts	L 1–11	0–1–0
January 20	at New Hampshire*	UNH Ice Rink • Durham, New Hampshire	L 0–12	0–2–0
February 11	at Deerfield Academy*	Deerfield, Massachusetts	L 2–7	0–3–0
*Non-conference game.
