= 1947–48 Suffolk Royals men's ice hockey season =

Sport season

- Conference: Independent

Record

Coaches and captains
- Head coach: Tom Moon
- Captain: David Perkins

The 1947–48 Suffolk Royals men's ice hockey season was the 2nd season of play for the program but first under the oversight of the NCAA. The Royals represent Suffolk University and were coached by Tom Moon, in his 2nd season.

== Season ==
Despite returning many of the players from the program's first season, Tom Moon had some difficulty in getting the team to find any traction. The biggest problem for the team was a lack of facilities; they were only able to practice 4 hours a week at most and did not have anything resembling a home venue. As a result, the offense could barely score for most of the season while the defense was porous. The only thing that seemed to keep the Royals in any of their games was the play of the goaltenders. Elliot Schafer was the best player for the opening match against Tufts while George Adams, the understudy, had a marvelous performance versus Bowdoin by making 75 saves.

It's unclear how many games the team managed to play as the school's records cease after the match with Bowdoin.

== Roster ==
No.	Nat.	Player	Class	Pos	Height	Weight	DoB	Hometown	Previous team
		George Adams		G
		Balfour
		Browne
		Burrows
		Conley
		Connor		D
		Cronin
		DiMasi
		Downey		F
		Henry
		MacDonald		F
		Meikle
		O'Connell
		David R. Perkins (C)		F
		Ross		D
		Elliot Shafer		G
		Sweeney

== Standings ==
1947–48 NCAA Independent ice hockey standings
	Intercollegiate							Overall					
	GP	W	L	T	Pct.	GF	GA	GP	W	L	T	GF	GA
Army	16	11	4	1	.719	78	39	16	11	4	1	78	39
Bemidji State	5	0	5	0	.000	13	36	10	2	8	0	37	63
Boston College	19	14	5	0	.737	126	60	19	14	5	0	126	60
Boston University	24	20	4	0	.833	179	86	24	20	4	0	179	86
Bowdoin	9	4	5	0	.444	45	68	11	6	5	0	56	73
Brown	14	5	9	0	.357	61	91	14	5	9	0	61	91
California	10	2	8	0	.200	45	67	18	6	12	0	94	106
Clarkson	12	5	6	1	.458	67	39	17	10	6	1	96	54
Colby	8	2	6	0	.250	28	41	8	2	6	0	28	41
Colgate	10	7	3	0	.700	54	34	13	10	3	0	83	45
Colorado College	14	9	5	0	.643	84	73	27	19	8	0	207	120
Cornell	4	0	4	0	.000	3	43	4	0	4	0	3	43
Dartmouth	23	21	2	0	.913	156	76	24	21	3	0	156	81
Fort Devens State	13	3	10	0	.231	33	74	–	–	–	–	–	–
Georgetown	3	2	1	0	.667	12	11	7	5	2	0	37	21
Hamilton	–	–	–	–	–	–	–	14	7	7	0	–	–
Harvard	22	9	13	0	.409	131	131	23	9	14	0	135	140
Lehigh	9	0	9	0	.000	10	100	11	0	11	0	14	113
Massachusetts	2	0	2	0	.000	1	23	3	0	3	0	3	30
Michigan	18	16	2	0	.889	105	53	23	20	2	1	141	63
Michigan Tech	19	7	12	0	.368	87	96	20	8	12	0	91	97
Middlebury	14	8	5	1	.607	111	68	16	10	5	1	127	74
Minnesota	16	9	7	0	.563	78	73	21	9	12	0	100	105
Minnesota–Duluth	6	3	3	0	.500	21	24	9	6	3	0	36	28
MIT	19	8	11	0	.421	93	114	19	8	11	0	93	114
New Hampshire	13	4	9	0	.308	58	67	13	4	9	0	58	67
North Dakota	10	6	4	0	.600	51	46	16	11	5	0	103	68
North Dakota Agricultural	8	5	3	0	.571	43	33	8	5	3	0	43	33
Northeastern	19	10	9	0	.526	135	119	19	10	9	0	135	119
Norwich	9	3	6	0	.333	38	58	13	6	7	0	56	70
Princeton	18	8	10	0	.444	65	72	21	10	11	0	79	79
St. Cloud State	12	10	2	0	.833	55	35	16	12	4	0	73	55
St. Lawrence	9	6	3	0	.667	65	27	13	8	4	1	95	50
Suffolk	–	–	–	–	–	–	–	–	–	–	–	–	–
Tufts	4	3	1	0	.750	17	15	4	3	1	0	17	15
Union	9	1	8	0	.111	7	86	9	1	8	0	7	86
Williams	11	3	6	2	.364	37	47	13	4	7	2	–	–
Yale	16	5	10	1	.344	60	69	20	8	11	1	89	85

== Schedule and results ==
Date	Opponent	Site	Result	Record
Regular season
December 22	at Tufts*	Boston Arena • Boston, Massachusetts	L 1–5	0–1–0
?	Holy Cross*	? • ?	L ?	0–2–0
January 11	at MIT*	Boston Skating Club • Boston, Massachusetts	L 4–10	0–3–0
January 22	at Bowdoin*	Delta Rink • Brunswick, Maine	L 3–8	0–4–0
February 8	at Colby*	Boston Arena • Boston, Massachusetts	L 0–8	0–5–0
*Non-conference game.
