= 1947–48 Princeton Tigers men's ice hockey season =

College ice hockey season

- Conference: T–4th Pentagonal League
- Home ice: Hobey Baker Memorial Rink

Record
- Overall: 10–11–0
- Conference: 2–5–0
- Home: 8–7–0
- Road: 0–3–0
- Neutral: 2–1–0

Coaches and captains
- Head coach: Richard Vaughan
- Captain: Chuck Callanan

The 1947–48 Princeton Tigers men's ice hockey season was the 46th season of play for the program but first under the oversight of the NCAA. The Tigers represented Princeton University and were coached by Richard Vaughan in his 11th season.

== Season ==
After a terrible end to the previous season, the Tigers were looking to get a good jump on the year. The first game against Brown, who were returning to the ice after a 9-year layoff, was a relatively soft landing for the Tigers who won the game as much on their depth as anything else. After inserting Robert O'Conner into the starting role for team captain Charlie Callanan, coach Vaughan got the Tigers to perform much better in their second game.

Over the winter break, Princeton travelled up to Buffalo to participate in a 4-team winter carnival. With Callanan back in goal, the Tigers won the first two games with solid performances on both sides of the puck. This left them with an impeccable 5–0 record as they entered the showdown with the defending eastern champions, Dartmouth. With a potential NCAA tournament berth up for grabs, the Tigers wanted to at least give the Indians a fight, however, the Greens demonstrated why they were one of the best teams in the country by taking complete control of the game. While Princeton didn't look out of place on the same ice as Dartmouth, the Hanoverians were obviously the better of the two.

On their way back to campus, the team made a pitstop in Canton to take on St. Lawrence. Unfortunately, the team got into penalty trouble in the first and surrendered 2 power play goals which the Larries rode to a 3–6 win. The Tigers hoped that they could flip the script a week later when they met Dartmouth for a rematch but the second edition was eerily similar to the first. Despite a strong defensive performance by O'Conner and Schmon, the Indians potted 6 goals in Princeton's first league game since 1942. The team collected itself and ended their losing streak with an overtime win over Clarkson thanks to a goal from Walt Elsaesser.

After righting the ship, Princeton played just one game over the next two and a half weeks. They met the US Olympic Team in that aggregation's first game together. The Tigers took advantage of the lack of familiarity by scoring 5 goals in the first and riding that to an easy 6–2 victory.

Princeton didn't play another game until the end of the month and, when they did, had lost both Bob Schmon and Paul Van Dyke to academic ineligibility. The team looked completely out of sorts in the match against Boston University and produced their worst performance all season, losing 1–8. Without those two lynchpins in the lineup, the Tigers lost the other two games before the start of the Spring semester, dropping their record to 7–6.

Refusing to bow to the difficulties, the Tigers fought back in the next game and upset tournament-hopeful Boston College. Princeton continued its inspired play and won matches against both Harvard and Yale. With Bill Clarkson taking over from Van Dyke as the team's #1 center, both he and Freddie Roberts recorded hat-tricks to give the Tigers a pair of conference wins.

The three wins gave Princeton an outside chance at the NCAA tournament but they would have to continue the strong play over the remaining five game. Unfortunately, the entire offense fell apart down the stretch. In the final 5 contests, Princeton scored just 9 goals and lost every game. The Tigers had been 2nd in the Pentagonal League at the time but ended up tied for last with Yale and had yet another disappointing finish to their season.

== Roster ==
No.	Nat.	Player	Class	Pos	Height	Weight	DoB	Hometown	Previous team
		John F. Bernard	Junior	D			1923-09-06	Wellesley, Massachusetts
40		Charles R. Callanan	Graduate	G			1925-08-31	Albany, New York
		William F. Clarkson	Sophomore	F				Pittsburgh, Pennsylvania
		Melville P. Dickenson Jr.	Junior				1928-03-05	Princeton, New Jersey
		Walter A. Elsaesser	Graduate	F			1924-02-18	Morristown, New Jersey
		Charles R. Erdman III	Graduate				1923-09-07	Princeton, New Jersey
		Peter E. B. Erdman	Sophomore					Princeton, New Jersey
		Dean W. Mathey	Sophomore					Brooklyn, New York
		Anthony M. O'Connor	Junior
		Robert B. O'Connor Jr.	Sophomore	G
		John M. Ricker	Graduate	D				Walpole, Massachusetts
		Frederick G. Roberts	Junior	F
		Richard P. Ryerson	Junior				1927-06-15	Glen Ridge, New Jersey
		Robert E. Ryerson Jr.	Graduate
		Henry W. Safarik	Sophomore	D				New York, New York
		Fredric E. Schluter Jr.	Sophomore					Bronxville, New York
		William E. Schluter	Sophomore	D			1927-11-05	Bronxville, New York
50		Robert M. Schmon	Graduate	D				Glen Ridge, New Jersey
		O. Jones Toland Jr.					1927-12-30	Whitemarsh Township, Pennsylvania
11		Paul C. Van Dyke	Sophomore	F				Litchfield, Connecticut
		Robert S. Wicks	Graduate					Lawrenceville, New Jersey

== Standings ==
1947–48 NCAA Independent ice hockey standings
	Intercollegiate							Overall					
	GP	W	L	T	Pct.	GF	GA	GP	W	L	T	GF	GA
Army	16	11	4	1	.719	78	39	16	11	4	1	78	39
Bemidji State	5	0	5	0	.000	13	36	10	2	8	0	37	63
Boston College	19	14	5	0	.737	126	60	19	14	5	0	126	60
Boston University	24	20	4	0	.833	179	86	24	20	4	0	179	86
Bowdoin	9	4	5	0	.444	45	68	11	6	5	0	56	73
Brown	14	5	9	0	.357	61	91	14	5	9	0	61	91
California	10	2	8	0	.200	45	67	18	6	12	0	94	106
Clarkson	12	5	6	1	.458	67	39	17	10	6	1	96	54
Colby	8	2	6	0	.250	28	41	8	2	6	0	28	41
Colgate	10	7	3	0	.700	54	34	13	10	3	0	83	45
Colorado College	14	9	5	0	.643	84	73	27	19	8	0	207	120
Cornell	4	0	4	0	.000	3	43	4	0	4	0	3	43
Dartmouth	23	21	2	0	.913	156	76	24	21	3	0	156	81
Fort Devens State	13	3	10	0	.231	33	74	–	–	–	–	–	–
Georgetown	3	2	1	0	.667	12	11	7	5	2	0	37	21
Hamilton	–	–	–	–	–	–	–	14	7	7	0	–	–
Harvard	22	9	13	0	.409	131	131	23	9	14	0	135	140
Lehigh	9	0	9	0	.000	10	100	11	0	11	0	14	113
Massachusetts	2	0	2	0	.000	1	23	3	0	3	0	3	30
Michigan	18	16	2	0	.889	105	53	23	20	2	1	141	63
Michigan Tech	19	7	12	0	.368	87	96	20	8	12	0	91	97
Middlebury	14	8	5	1	.607	111	68	16	10	5	1	127	74
Minnesota	16	9	7	0	.563	78	73	21	9	12	0	100	105
Minnesota–Duluth	6	3	3	0	.500	21	24	9	6	3	0	36	28
MIT	19	8	11	0	.421	93	114	19	8	11	0	93	114
New Hampshire	13	4	9	0	.308	58	67	13	4	9	0	58	67
North Dakota	10	6	4	0	.600	51	46	16	11	5	0	103	68
North Dakota Agricultural	8	5	3	0	.571	43	33	8	5	3	0	43	33
Northeastern	19	10	9	0	.526	135	119	19	10	9	0	135	119
Norwich	9	3	6	0	.333	38	58	13	6	7	0	56	70
Princeton	18	8	10	0	.444	65	72	21	10	11	0	79	79
St. Cloud State	12	10	2	0	.833	55	35	16	12	4	0	73	55
St. Lawrence	9	6	3	0	.667	65	27	13	8	4	1	95	50
Suffolk	–	–	–	–	–	–	–	–	–	–	–	–	–
Tufts	4	3	1	0	.750	17	15	4	3	1	0	17	15
Union	9	1	8	0	.111	7	86	9	1	8	0	7	86
Williams	11	3	6	2	.364	37	47	13	4	7	2	–	–
Yale	16	5	10	1	.344	60	69	20	8	11	1	89	85

1947–48 Pentagonal League standings
	Conference							Overall					
	GP	W	L	T	PTS	GF	GA	GP	W	L	T	GF	GA
Dartmouth †	7	7	0	0	1.000	49	20	24	21	3	0	156	81
Army	4	2	2	0	.500	12	17	16	11	4	1	78	39
Harvard	7	3	4	0	.429	31	33	23	9	14	0	135	140
Princeton	7	2	5	0	.286	23	31	21	10	11	0	79	79
Yale	7	2	5	0	.286	20	32	20	8	11	1	89	85
† indicates conference champion

== Schedule and results ==
Date	Opponent	Site	Result	Record
Regular Season
December 13	Brown*	Hobey Baker Memorial Rink • Princeton, New Jersey	W 7–4	1–0–0
December 15	St. Nicholas H. C.*	Hobey Baker Memorial Rink • Princeton, New Jersey	W 6–2	2–0–0
December 19	Colby*	Hobey Baker Memorial Rink • Princeton, New Jersey	W 7–0	3–0–0
December 29	vs. Colgate*	Buffalo Memorial Auditorium • Buffalo, New York	W 3–1	4–0–0
December 30	vs. Williams*	Buffalo Memorial Auditorium • Buffalo, New York	W 5–2	5–0–0
January 1	vs. Dartmouth*	Buffalo Memorial Auditorium • Buffalo, New York	L 1–5	5–1–0
January 3	St. Lawrence*	Hobey Baker Memorial Rink • Princeton, New Jersey	L 3–6	5–2–0
January 10	at Dartmouth	Davis Rink • Hanover, New Hampshire	L 2–6	5–3–0 (0–1–0)
January 13	Clarkson*	Hobey Baker Memorial Rink • Princeton, New Jersey	W 4–3 ^{OT}	6–3–0
January 17	US Olympic Team*	Hobey Baker Memorial Rink • Princeton, New Jersey	W 6–2	7–3–0
January 31	Boston University*	Hobey Baker Memorial Rink • Princeton, New Jersey	L 1–8	7–4–0
February 3	St. Nicholas H. C.*	Hobey Baker Memorial Rink • Princeton, New Jersey	L 2–3	7–5–0
February 7	Colgate*	Hobey Baker Memorial Rink • Princeton, New Jersey	L 4–5	7–6–0
February 10	Boston College*	Hobey Baker Memorial Rink • Princeton, New Jersey	W 5–4	8–6–0
February 14	Harvard	Hobey Baker Memorial Rink • Princeton, New Jersey	W 8–4	9–6–0 (1–1–0)
February 21	Yale	Hobey Baker Memorial Rink • Princeton, New Jersey	W 6–3	10–6–0 (2–1–0)
February 27	at Yale	New Haven Arena • New Haven, Connecticut	L 1–2 ^{OT}	10–7–0 (2–2–0)
March 1	Williams*	Hobey Baker Memorial Rink • Princeton, New Jersey	L 2–3	10–8–0
March 6	Dartmouth	Hobey Baker Memorial Rink • Princeton, New Jersey	L 2–5	10–9–0 (2–3–0)
March 10	at Harvard	Boston Arena • Boston, Massachusetts	L 2–6	10–10–0 (2–4–0)
March 13	Army	Hobey Baker Memorial Rink • Princeton, New Jersey	L 2–5	10–11–0 (2–5–0)
*Non-conference game.
