= 1947–48 Georgetown Hoyas men's ice hockey season =

- Conference: Independent
- Home ice: Uline Arena

Record
- Overall: 5–2–0
- Home: 2–0–0
- Road: 3–0–0
- Neutral: 0–2–0

Coaches and captains
- Head coach: Bob Panoff
- Captain: Steve Smith

The 1947–48 Georgetown Hoyas men's ice hockey season was the 6th season of play for the program but first under the oversight of the NCAA. The Hoyas represented Georgetown University and were coached by Bob Panoff, in his 2nd season.

== Season ==
Georgetown got a rather auspicious jump to the season when they rolled over Lafayette 17–1. While the scoring was spread out over the lineup, Charley Palms and Jim Smith led the way with 5 points each. The following weekend the team took a trip up to Pennsylvania and took a close meeting from Lehigh. They were supposed to play a rematch with Lafayette during the excursion but the Leopards ended up forfeiting the match. Instead, Georgetown returned home and continued their hot start with a second win over the Engineers.

With the team riding high, they headed up to Norwalk, Connecticut, for a two-game series. Unfortunately, the matches only served to show that Georgetown still had a long way to go to be in the same league as the college hockey elites. Afterwards, the team had a long layoff before their next game and they appeared rust in the match against the Baltimore All-Stars. However, Joe Gately stood tall in goal and made 64 saves to lead his team to a victory.

While Georgetown's season wrapped up with the Baltimore win, there were reports that the Hoyas may be invited to participate in an AAU tournament in Buffalo in late March. Unfortunately, no invitation was forthcoming and the Hoyas' season was over.

== Roster ==
No.	Nat.	Player	Class	Pos	Height	Weight	DoB	Hometown	Previous team
0		Joseph E. Gately	Senior	G				Baltimore, Maryland
0		John H. Staub Jr.	Freshman	G			1928-07-02	Stamford, Connecticut
1		John H. Cassidy Jr.	Senior	F				Watertown, Connecticut
2		Stephen E. Smith (C)	Senior	F				Brooklyn, New York
3		Richard Harding	Junior
4		James Curley		D
6		George M. Allerton Jr.	Sophomore					Watertown, Connecticut
7		Thomas L. Cassidy	Sophomore	F				Watertown, Connecticut
8		Charles L. Palms III	Junior	F			1925-06-30	Detroit, Michigan
9		Patrick J. Cassidy	Senior	F				Watertown, Connecticut
12		David I. Campbell	Freshman	F				Worcester, Massachusetts
14		Constantine O'Doherty Jr.	Sophomore	D			1923-08-23	Woburn, Massachusetts
16		Gerald Cassidy	Junior	F				Watertown, Connecticut
18		Richard I. Werder	Senior				1922-07-31	Buffalo, New York
43		Hamilton		G
		Robert Fitzgerald
		Thomas M. McKenna Jr.	Sophomore				1924-11-09	Washington, D.C.

== Standings ==
1947–48 NCAA Independent ice hockey standings
	Intercollegiate							Overall					
	GP	W	L	T	Pct.	GF	GA	GP	W	L	T	GF	GA
Army	16	11	4	1	.719	78	39	16	11	4	1	78	39
Bemidji State	5	0	5	0	.000	13	36	10	2	8	0	37	63
Boston College	19	14	5	0	.737	126	60	19	14	5	0	126	60
Boston University	24	20	4	0	.833	179	86	24	20	4	0	179	86
Bowdoin	9	4	5	0	.444	45	68	11	6	5	0	56	73
Brown	14	5	9	0	.357	61	91	14	5	9	0	61	91
California	10	2	8	0	.200	45	67	18	6	12	0	94	106
Clarkson	12	5	6	1	.458	67	39	17	10	6	1	96	54
Colby	8	2	6	0	.250	28	41	8	2	6	0	28	41
Colgate	10	7	3	0	.700	54	34	13	10	3	0	83	45
Colorado College	14	9	5	0	.643	84	73	27	19	8	0	207	120
Cornell	4	0	4	0	.000	3	43	4	0	4	0	3	43
Dartmouth	23	21	2	0	.913	156	76	24	21	3	0	156	81
Fort Devens State	13	3	10	0	.231	33	74	–	–	–	–	–	–
Georgetown	3	2	1	0	.667	12	11	7	5	2	0	37	21
Hamilton	–	–	–	–	–	–	–	14	7	7	0	–	–
Harvard	22	9	13	0	.409	131	131	23	9	14	0	135	140
Lehigh	9	0	9	0	.000	10	100	11	0	11	0	14	113
Massachusetts	2	0	2	0	.000	1	23	3	0	3	0	3	30
Michigan	18	16	2	0	.889	105	53	23	20	2	1	141	63
Michigan Tech	19	7	12	0	.368	87	96	20	8	12	0	91	97
Middlebury	14	8	5	1	.607	111	68	16	10	5	1	127	74
Minnesota	16	9	7	0	.563	78	73	21	9	12	0	100	105
Minnesota–Duluth	6	3	3	0	.500	21	24	9	6	3	0	36	28
MIT	19	8	11	0	.421	93	114	19	8	11	0	93	114
New Hampshire	13	4	9	0	.308	58	67	13	4	9	0	58	67
North Dakota	10	6	4	0	.600	51	46	16	11	5	0	103	68
North Dakota Agricultural	8	5	3	0	.571	43	33	8	5	3	0	43	33
Northeastern	19	10	9	0	.526	135	119	19	10	9	0	135	119
Norwich	9	3	6	0	.333	38	58	13	6	7	0	56	70
Princeton	18	8	10	0	.444	65	72	21	10	11	0	79	79
St. Cloud State	12	10	2	0	.833	55	35	16	12	4	0	73	55
St. Lawrence	9	6	3	0	.667	65	27	13	8	4	1	95	50
Suffolk	–	–	–	–	–	–	–	–	–	–	–	–	–
Tufts	4	3	1	0	.750	17	15	4	3	1	0	17	15
Union	9	1	8	0	.111	7	86	9	1	8	0	7	86
Williams	11	3	6	2	.364	37	47	13	4	7	2	–	–
Yale	16	5	10	1	.344	60	69	20	8	11	1	89	85

== Schedule and results ==
Date	Opponent	Site	Result	Record
Regular Season
February 9	Lafayette ^{†}*	Uline Arena • Washington, D.C.	W 17–1	1–0–0
February 14	at Lehigh*	Albeth Ice Rink • Allentown, Pennsylvania	W 4–2	2–0–0
February 15	at Lafayette ^{†}*	Easton, Pennsylvania	W forfeit	3–0–0
February 16	Lehigh*	Uline Arena • Washington, D.C.	W 7–1	4–0–0
February 19	vs. St. Nicholas A. C.*	Crystal Ice Palace • Norwalk, Connecticut	L 2–6	4–1–0
February 20	vs. Boston College*	Crystal Ice Palace • Norwalk, Connecticut	L 1–8	4–2–0
March 13	at Baltimore All-Stars*	Baltimore Sports Palace • Baltimore, Maryland	W 6–3	5–2–0
*Non-conference game.

† Lafayette did not support a varsity program at this time.

== Scoring statistics ==
Name	Position	Games	Goals	Assists	Points	PIM
Steve Smith	C	-	6	-	-	-
Dave Campbell	LW	-	5	-	-	-
Charley Palms	RW	-	5	-	-	-
Jerry Cassidy	F	-	4	-	-	-
John Cassidy	C	-	4	-	-	-
Dick Harding	F	-	3	-	-	-
Jim Curley	D	-	2	-	-	-
Bob Fitzgerald	F	-	2	-	-	-
Pat Cassidy	RW	-	1	-	-	-
Tom Cassidy	LW	-	1	-	-	-
Tom McKenna		-	1	-	-	-
Connie O'Doherty	D	-	1	-	-	-
Bus Werder		-	1	-	-	-
Joe Gately	G	-	0	-	-	-
Hamilton	G	-	0	-	-	-
John Staub	G	-	0	-	-	-
Total			37			

Note: one goal in the game against Baltimore is not accounted for.
