= Smith Rink =

Military ice rink in West Point, New York

- Interactive map of Smith Rink
- Location: 698 Mills Road, West Point, New York 10996
- Coordinates: 41°23′03″N 73°57′44″W
- Owner: United States Military Academy
- Operator: United States Military Academy

Construction
- Opened: 1930 (95–96 years ago)
- Closed: 1985 (40–41 years ago)
- Demolished: 1986 (39–40 years ago)

Tenant
- Army ice hockey 1930–1985

The Smith Rink was an outdoor ice rink on the campus of the United States Military Academy in West Point, New York. The rink served as the home for the Army ice hockey program for 55 years and was the last outdoor venue used for Division I hockey when the program was downgraded in 1973.

== History ==
Because West Point was too far away from many of the existing rinks at the time, Army's ice hockey team required a rink of their own. The Academy built the Smith Rink for the program after almost 30 years in operation, only the third permanent on-campus venue in the country (after the Hobey Baker Memorial Rink and the Davis Rink). The facility cost approximately $120,000 to construct and the team would use the Smith Rink as its home for the next 55 years.

In the 1960s, as a member of ECAC Hockey, Army remained in the upper division when the conference was split in two despite not having an indoor arena, one of the league requirements for being considered a major program. In 1973, however, the NCAA introduced numerical classifications for all sports and as a result Army dropped down to ECAC 2 for the remainder of the decade. In 1980 Army returned to Division I, but played a partial Division II schedule until 1985 when the indoor Tate Rink was completed and Army could again compete on equal footing with their contemporaries.

The Smith Rink was demolished less than one year after the team played its last game and the space is now occupied by the Herbert Alumni Center.
