= New England Intercollegiate Hockey League =

- Founded: 1936
- Folded: 1954
- Sports fielded: Ice hockey
- No. of teams: 8 to 11
- Region: Northeastern United States

The New England Intercollegiate Hockey League is a defunct NCAA Division I ice hockey-only conference. The league was an early attempt by second-tier programs to form a conference and stabilize their schedules during the Great Depression. The champion of the league received the Donald Sands Memorial Trophy.

== History ==
While the upper echelon of college hockey teams had been creating formal leagues for decades, many of the 'lesser' schools were frozen out of these conferences. In the mid-30's, several teams in New England decided to band together and form their own aggregation, the New England Intercollegiate Hockey League. Originally, The league was made up by eight members, however, there were few requirements with regards to participation. All games between league members were counted in the standings, however, teams were not required to play against all of their conference opponents. This loose policy led to an unbalanced schedule and the teams with the superior records not necessarily being the best.

The league continued unaltered until World War II forced several members to suspend operations. In 1942, Hew Hampshire, Colby and Bowdoin were replaced by Tufts and Norwich. The following year, the league was suspended due to most other programs stopping for the duration of the war. The league returned in 1946, once college hockey resumed in full. A year later, the league held its first postseason and became the first unofficial conference to hold a postseason game in over 40 years. In 1949, Boston College became the first league member to win a National Championship.

Unfortunately, despite the successes of some members, the league itself was not in a good position. Because members were not required to play one another, higher-ranked programs could avoid scheduling lower-ranked or 'smaller' opponents, creating an informal tier system within the conference. Additionally, upon the creation of the Tri-State League in 1950, the NEIHL faced external competition as one of three conferences in the Northeast, where it was often regarded as less competitive among the group. The conference continued during the early years of the 1950s. However, after Boston College chose not to attend the conference tournament in 1952, the postseason format was abandoned. In its place, BC, BU and Northeastern joined with Harvard to found the Beanpot the following year. Largely superfluous by then, the league fizzled and was formally dissolved in 1954.

While the conference's demise was unfortunate, most of the league members would eventually help form ECAC Hockey in 1961, a 28-team super-conference. Tufts suspended its program from 1960 to 1986 while Fort Devens State closed its doors in 1949.

== Members ==
Locations of member teams
Around Boston

Institution	Nickname	Location	Founded	Tenure	Current conference	Colors
American International College	Yellow Jackets	Springfield, Massachusetts	1885	1948–1954	Atlantic Hockey	
Boston College	Eagles	Chestnut Hill, Massachusetts	1863	1936–1954	Hockey East	
Boston University	Terriers	Boston, Massachusetts	1839	1936–1954	Hockey East	
Bowdoin College	Polar Bears	Brunswick, Maine	1794	1936–1954	NESCAC	
Colby College	Mules	Waterville, Maine	1813	1936–1954	NESCAC	
Massachusetts State College–Fort Devens	Chiefs	Ayer, Massachusetts	1946	1947–1949	College closed	
Massachusetts Institute of Technology	Engineers	Cambridge, Massachusetts	1861	1936–1954	Program Suspended	
Middlebury College	Panthers	Middlebury, Vermont	1800	1936–1954	NESCAC	
University of New Hampshire	Wildcats	Durham, New Hampshire	1866	1936–1954	Hockey East	
Northeastern University	Huskies	Boston, Massachusetts	1898	1936–1954	Hockey East	
Norwich University	Cadets	Northfield, Vermont	1819	1936–1954	NEHC	
Tufts University	Jumbos	Medford, Massachusetts	1852	1942–1954	NESCAC	

== Champions ==
Year	Champion	Record	Tournament Champion
1936–37	Boston College	5–1–1	—
1937–38	Boston University	5–1–2	—
1938–39	Boston University	6–0–0	—
1939–40	Boston College	10–0–0	—
1940–41	Boston College	8–0–0	—
1941–42	Boston College	8–0–0	—
1942–43	Northeastern*	7–2–0	—
1946–47	Boston University	11–0–1	—
1947–48	Boston University	12–1–0	Boston College
1948–49	Boston College	9–0–0	Boston College
1949–50	Boston University	8–1–0	Boston University
1950–51	Boston College	6–1–0	Boston University
1951–52	Boston College	7–2–0	Boston University^
1952–53	Boston College	5–2–1	—
1953–54	Boston College	6–0–0	—

* Boston College defeated Northeastern twice during the season and finished with an undefeated record in league play, however, because the Eagles only played 4 games due to issues from the war, they were ruled to have not played sufficient games to qualify for the championship.
^ Rather than a conference tournament, the NEIHL held an invitational tournament that included non-conference teams.

== See also ==
- Beanpot (ice hockey)
- ECAC Hockey
