= 1936–37 Lafayette Leopards men's ice hockey season =

1936-37 Lafayette Leopards men's ice hockey season
- Conference: Independent

Record
- Overall: 1–1–0
- Road: 0–1–0
- Neutral: 1–0–0

Coaches and captains
- Head coach: Henry W. Clark; Dale H. Moore

The 1936–37 Lafayette Leopards men's ice hockey season was the inaugural season of play for the program. The Leopards represented Lafayette College and were coached by Henry W. Clark and Dale H. Moore in their 1st seasons.

== Season ==
After an aborted attempt at forming an ice hockey team in the 1920, students at Lafayette tried a second time to form a squad in the mid 30s. Two years later, the school's athletic director, Henry W. Clark, announced that the school's first official ice hockey game would take place in February. The Leopards lost their opening match to a collection of Princeton all-stars but produced a credible result considering that it was their first game together.

A second match was arranged for the following week against Swarthmore at Skytop rink, unfortunately, soft ice necessitated the cancellation of the game. The team's second match that season ended up being played against Lehigh at Skytop. It resulted in the first win for the Leopards' program, albeit against a club team.

== Roster ==
No.	Nat.	Player	Class	Pos	Height	Weight	DoB	Hometown	Previous team
		John Allen	Freshman
		Nils Askman
		Boyer
		Breitowitch
		Tony Cavallo	Sophomore	F
		Clark
		DeMuro
		Bill Farinon	Sophomore	G
		Bud Henderson	Freshman	D
		Bud Kinne		F
		Mailler		F
		Wes McLaughlin		F
	(Canada)	Frank Murphy	Freshman	F/D				Montreal, Quebec
		Bud Pease	Freshman
		Peterson
		Edward Ricci	Sophomore	F
		Charlie Scofield	Sophomore	D
		Norbert Weldon	Sophomore

== Standings ==
1936–37 Eastern Collegiate ice hockey standings
	Intercollegiate							Overall					
	GP	W	L	T	Pct.	GF	GA	GP	W	L	T	GF	GA
Army	–	–	–	–	–	–	–	10	5	5	0	27	22
Boston College	–	–	–	–	–	–	–	13	8	4	1	70	42
Boston University	14	8	6	0	.571	50	55	14	8	6	0	50	55
Bowdoin	–	–	–	–	–	–	–	7	1	6	0	–	–
Brown	–	–	–	–	–	–	–	10	6	4	0	–	–
Clarkson	–	–	–	–	–	–	–	9	6	3	0	50	26
Colgate	–	–	–	–	–	–	–	7	4	3	0	–	–
Cornell	2	1	1	0	.500	5	3	2	1	1	0	5	3
Dartmouth	–	–	–	–	–	–	–	25	12	13	0	114	117
Hamilton	–	–	–	–	–	–	–	7	1	6	0	–	–
Harvard	–	–	–	–	–	–	–	16	15	1	0	–	–
Lafayette	0	0	0	0	–	0	0	2	1	1	0	6	9
Massachusetts State	–	–	–	–	–	–	–	6	3	3	0	–	–
Middlebury	–	–	–	–	–	–	–	9	5	3	1	–	–
MIT	–	–	–	–	–	–	–	12	1	11	0	–	–
New Hampshire	–	–	–	–	–	–	–	8	3	5	0	21	34
Northeastern	–	–	–	–	–	–	–	10	6	3	1	–	–
Princeton	–	–	–	–	–	–	–	17	6	11	0	–	–
Rensselaer	–	–	–	–	–	–	–	1	0	1	0	–	–
Union	–	–	–	–	–	–	–	6	1	5	0	–	–
Williams	–	–	–	–	–	–	–	9	5	3	1	–	–
Yale	–	–	–	–	–	–	–	16	5	11	0	–	–

== Schedule and results ==
Date	Opponent	Site	Result	Record
Regular Season
February 13	at Princeton All-Stars*	Hobey Baker Memorial Rink • Princeton, New Jersey	L 3–7	0–1–0
February 27	vs. Lehigh*	Skytop Rink • Skytop, Pennsylvania	W 3–2	1–1–0
*Non-conference game. ^{#}Rankings from USCHO.com Poll.

== Scoring statistics ==
Name	Position	Games	Goals	Assists	Points	PIM
Bud Kinne	C	2	0	3	3	-
Tony Cavallo	RW	2	2	0	2	-
Frank Murphy	C/D	2	2	0	2	-
Wes McLaughlin	W	1	1	0	1	-
Charlie Scofield	D	2	1	0	1	-
John Allen		1	0	0	0	-
Boyer		1	0	0	0	-
Breitowitch		1	0	0	0	-
Clark		1	0	0	0	-
Bud Henderson	D	1	0	0	0	-
Peterson		1	0	0	0	-
Norbert Weldon		1	0	0	0	-
Nils Askman		2	0	0	0	-
DeMuro		2	0	0	0	-
Bill Farinon	G	2	0	0	0	-
Mailler	LW	2	0	0	0	-
Bud Peace		2	0	0	0	-
Edward Ricci		2	0	0	0	-
Total			6	3	9	-
