= Albert I. Prettyman =

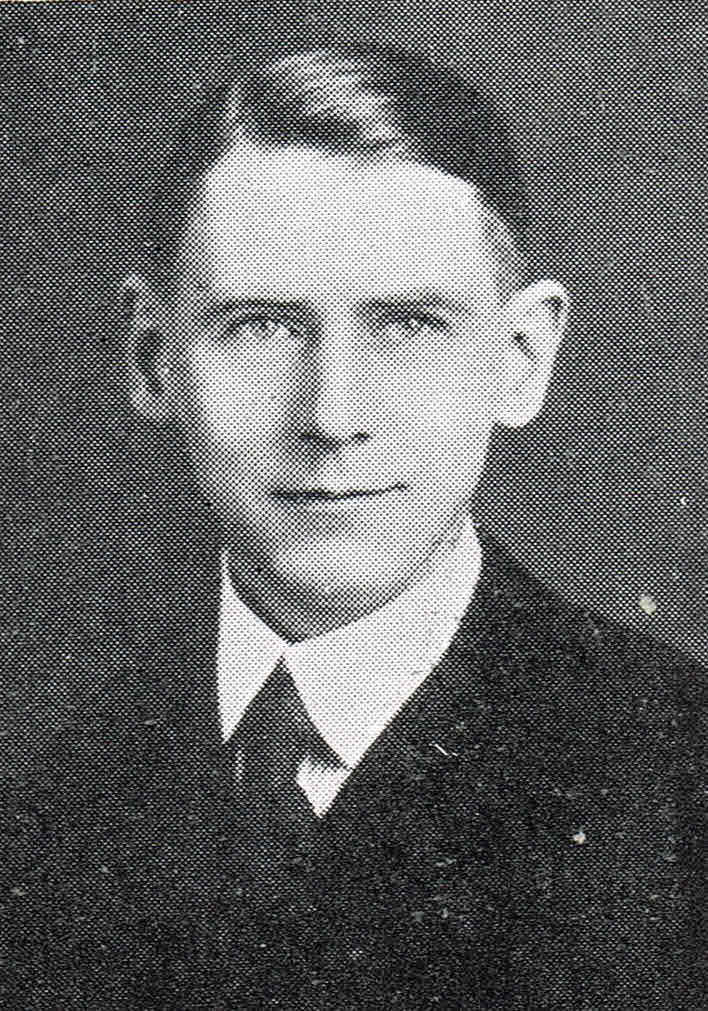
- Prettyman, c. 1922, pictured in the Hamilton College yearbook

Biographical details
- Born: February 7, 1883; Milford, Delaware, U.S.
- Died: May 24, 1963 (aged 80); Fort Pierce, Florida, U.S.

Playing career

Football
- c. 1905: Springfield Training School

Baseball
- c. 1905: Springfield Training School

Ice hockey
- c. 1905: Springfield Training School

Coaching career (HC unless noted)

Football
- 1912–1926: Nichols School (NY)
- 1917–1920: Hamilton

Ice hockey
- 1918–1943: Hamilton
- 1943–1944: Colgate

Administrative career (AD unless noted)
- 1912–1917: Nichols School (NY)
- 1917–1946: Hamilton
- 1946–1949: Sampson College

Head coaching record
- Overall: 11–10–3 (college football); 141–80–7 (college ice hockey)

Albert Ira Prettyman (February 7, 1883 – May 24, 1963) was an American sports coach, athletics administrator, and educator. During his career, he coached many sports, including football, basketball, baseball, and track and field, but the majority of his work was in ice hockey. He spent most of his career at Hamilton College, where he served as athletic director from 1917 to 1946, head football coached from 1917 to 1920, and head ice hockey coach from 1918 to 1943. Prettyman also coached the United States ice hockey team at the 1936 Winter Olympics, which won the bronze medal. Prettyman was a member of two Olympic Committees and the founder, and lasting member of, the National Collegiate Athletic Association's Hockey Rules Committee. When Prettyman died, the American Hockey Coaches Association called him "the father of college hockey."

== Early life and education ==
Prettyman was born on February 7, 1883, in Milford, Delaware. He attended the International Young Men's Christian Association Training School—now known as Springfield College–in Springfield, Massachusetts, from which he graduated in 1906. At the Springfield Training school, Prettyman played on the varsity football, baseball, and ice hockey teams.

== Coaching career ==
After graduating from Springfield, Prettyman was a professor of physical culture at Columbia University. He married Jane Mason Freed on December 22, 1906, in Philadelphia. Prettyman was later the director of gymnasium and athletics the Nichols School in Buffalo, New York. He also coached football at the Nichols School. In 1917, Prettyman moved to Hamilton College in Clinton, New York to teach physical education and coach. At Hamilton, he coached numerous sports including football, track, basketball, baseball, and hockey. He is best known for his work with the hockey team. He started the Hamilton hockey team in 1918 with the first rink a frozen over tennis court at Hamilton College. In 1921, Prettyman convinced the college to build the Russell Sage Rink, an indoor hockey facility, by using a portion of a large donation from the Russel Sage Foundation. The rink is the oldest continuously operated college built covered arena in America. Prettyman later became Hamilton's athletic director and from 1926 to 1946 the chairman of the ice hockey rules committee for the National Collegiate Athletic Association (NCAA). He coached hockey at Hamilton from 1918 until 1943. After the Continentals shut down for World War II, he spent the 1943-44 season with Colgate before they too suspended play.

=== 1936 Olympics ===
Prettyman was the head coach of the United States hockey team at the 1936 Winter Olympics in Garmisch-Partenkirchen, Germany. Prettyman led a team that included United States Hockey Hall of Fame member John Garrison. The team finished 6–2–1 record and a bronze medal including a tie with eventual gold medal winner Great Britain.

Coach Prettyman and the US hockey team got into an incident with Adolf Hitler the evening before the US-German Hockey game. Hitler was upset with the fact the US team did not acknowledge him with customary Nazi salute during the opening ceremony. Hitler told the team in German, “We will beat your American team on the ice tomorrow.” Backup goalie Francis Baker, who was acting as translator, responded in German, "We will not only beat Germany in hockey tomorrow; the United States will always defeat Germany." The next day the U.S. beat Germany 1-0 in a snowstorm on an outdoor rink. In fitting retribution, Francis Baker continued his studies at Hamilton after the Olympics, became a doctor and landed as a medic on the beaches of Normandy in 1944 to make good on his locker room promise to Hitler eight years earlier.

== Death and legacy ==
Prettyman died on May 24, 1963, in Fort Pierce, Florida. Shortly after his death, the American Hockey Coaches Association called him "the father of college hockey." Even before he died Prettyman was the first person elected to the American Hockey Coaches Association’s Hall of Fame. Hamilton College honors him each year by awarding the Albert I. Prettyman Award to the player “who demonstrated outstanding dedication, determination, and desire. His attitude has proven to be not only an asset to his team, but an inspiration to his teammates and coaches.”

== Head coaching record ==
=== College football ===
Year	Team	Overall	Conference	Standing	Bowl/playoffs
Hamilton Continentals (Independent) (1917–1920)
1917	Hamilton	4–1–1			
1918	Hamilton	1–1–1			
1919	Hamilton	3–4–1			
1920	Hamilton	3–4			
Hamilton:		11–10–3			
Total:		11–10–3			

=== College ice hockey ===
Record table
Season	Team	Overall	Conference	Standing	Postseason
Hamilton Continentals Independent (1918–1943)
1918–19	Hamilton	1–0–1			
1919–20	Hamilton	3–2–0			
1920–21	Hamilton	10–0–0			
1921–22	Hamilton	7–2–0			
1922–23	Hamilton	4–6–0			
1923–24	Hamilton	7–3–2			
1924–25	Hamilton	8–3–2			
1925–26	Hamilton	7–3–0			
1926–27	Hamilton	6–4–0			
1927–28	Hamilton	5–2–1			
1928–29	Hamilton	4–6–0			
1929–30	Hamilton	4–4–0			
1930–31	Hamilton	7–1–1			
1931–32	Hamilton	2–2–0			
1932–33	Hamilton	5–1–0			
1933–34	Hamilton	9–1–0			
1934–35	Hamilton	6–2–0			
1935–36	Hamilton	5–3–0			
1936–37	Hamilton	1–6–0			
1937–38	Hamilton	5–4–0			
1938–39	Hamilton	5–6–0			
1939–40	Hamilton	9–4–0			
1940–41	Hamilton	5–4–0			
1941–42	Hamilton	5–3–0			
1942–43	Hamilton	5–4–0			
Hamilton:		135–76–7			
Colgate Red Raiders Independent (1943–1944)
1943–44	Colgate	6–4–0			
Colgate:		6–4–0			
Total:		141–80–7			
