= United States men's national ice hockey team =

Men's national ice hockey team representing the United States

United States
- Nickname: Team USA
- Association: USA Hockey
- General manager: John Vanbiesbrouck
- Head coach: Don Granato
- Assistants: Kevin Dean; Darby Hendrickson; Ty Hennes; Brandon Naurato
- Captain: Justin Faulk
- Most games: Mark Johnson
- Top scorer: Paul Johnson (106)
- Most points: Keith Christiansen (183)
- Team colors
- IIHF code: USA
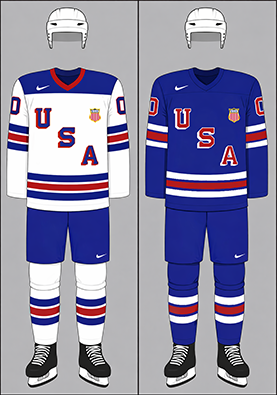

Ranking
- Current IIHF: 3 ▼2 (June 3, 2026)
- Highest IIHF: 1 (2025–2026)
- Lowest IIHF: 7 (2003, 2006–07, 2012)

First international
- United States 29–0 Switzerland (Antwerp, Belgium; April 24, 1920)

Biggest win
- United States 31–1 Italy (St. Moritz, Switzerland; February 1, 1948)

Biggest defeat
- Sweden 17–2 United States (Stockholm, Sweden; March 12, 1963); Soviet Union 17–2 United States (Stockholm, Sweden; March 15, 1969)

Olympics
- Appearances: 25 (first in 1920)
- Medals: Gold: 3 (1960, 1980, 2026); Silver: 8 (1920, 1924, 1932, 1952, 1956, 1972, 2002, 2010); Bronze: 1 (1936)

IIHF World Championships
- Appearances: 77 (first in 1920)
- Best result: Gold: 3 (1933, 1960, 2025)

Canada Cup / World Cup
- Appearances: 8 (first in 1976)
- Best result: Winner: 1 (1996)

International record (W–L–T)
- 591–503–87

Medal record

Olympic Games
Gold medal – first place	1960 Squaw Valley	Team
Gold medal – first place	1980 Lake Placid	Team
Gold medal – first place	2026 Milan Cortina	Team
Silver medal – second place	1920 Antwerp	Team
Silver medal – second place	1924 Chamonix	Team
Silver medal – second place	1932 Lake Placid	Team
Silver medal – second place	1952 Oslo	Team
Silver medal – second place	1956 Cortina d'Ampezzo	Team
Silver medal – second place	1972 Sapporo	Team
Silver medal – second place	2002 Salt Lake City	Team
Silver medal – second place	2010 Vancouver	Team
Bronze medal – third place	1936 Garmisch-Partenkirchen	Team

World Championships
Gold medal – first place	1933 Czechoslovakia	
Gold medal – first place	1960 United States	Team
Gold medal – first place	2025 Sweden–Denmark	
Silver medal – second place	1920 Belgium	Team
Silver medal – second place	1924 France	Team
Silver medal – second place	1931 Poland	
Silver medal – second place	1932 United States	Team
Silver medal – second place	1934 Italy	
Silver medal – second place	1939 Switzerland	
Silver medal – second place	1950 Great Britain	
Silver medal – second place	1952 Norway	Team
Silver medal – second place	1956 Italy	Team
Bronze medal – third place	1936 Germany	Team
Bronze medal – third place	1949 Sweden	
Bronze medal – third place	1962 United States	
Bronze medal – third place	1996 Austria	
Bronze medal – third place	2004 Czech Republic	
Bronze medal – third place	2013 Sweden & Finland	
Bronze medal – third place	2015 Czech Republic	
Bronze medal – third place	2018 Denmark	
Bronze medal – third place	2021 Latvia	

World Cup of Hockey
Gold medal – first place	1996 Philadelphia/Montreal	

The United States men's national ice hockey team, also known as Team USA, represents the United States in men's international ice hockey. The team is controlled by USA Hockey, the governing body for organized ice hockey in the United States. As of June 2026, the team is ranked 3rd in the IIHF World Rankings.

Team USA has won gold medals at the 1960, 1980, and 2026 Olympics. Their victory at the 1980 Olympics, known as the "Miracle on Ice", is widely regarded as one of the greatest upsets in sports history, when a team composed largely of amateur and collegiate players defeated the heavily favored Soviet Union en route to the gold medal. In 2026, the United States won its first Olympic gold since 1980 after defeating Canada in overtime in the final. Team USA has won silver medals at the Olympics eight times overall, including most recently at the 2002 and 2010 Olympics. The US has also won the World Cup of Hockey, defeating Canada in the finals at the 1996 tournament. The team's most recent medal at the World Championships came in with a historic gold in 2025, their first victory in the tournament since 1960 and third overall (also in 1933). Unlike many European nations, the United States has often sent less experienced rosters to the World Championships, largely because the tournament overlaps with the NHL playoffs and because not all eligible players choose to participate. By the 2020s, however, USA Hockey began placing greater emphasis on the tournament and assembling stronger, more competitive teams. Overall, the team has collected twelve Olympic medals (three of them gold), 21 World Championship medals (three of them gold, including 1960), and it reached the semi-final round of the Canada Cup/World Cup five times, twice advancing to the finals and winning gold once. Until 2025, the US had never reached a World Championship gold medal game, having lost in the semi-final round twelve times since the IIHF introduced a playoff system in 1992; this included six semi-finals appearances in ten tournaments from 2013 through 2023, and three consecutive in 2021, 2022, and 2023.

The US is one of the most successful national ice hockey teams in the world and a member of the so-called "Big Six", the unofficial group of the six strongest men's ice hockey nations, along with Canada, the Czech Republic, Finland, Russia, and Sweden.

== History ==
=== Early history ===
The United States first entered international ice hockey competition at the 1920 Summer Olympics in Antwerp, where the sport made its Olympic debut, earning a silver medal behind Canada. American teams continued to be competitive throughout the 1920s and early 1930s, claiming silver medals at the 1924 and 1932 Winter Olympics, as well as at the 1931 IIHF World Championships. In this era, the US national squads were typically composed of players drawn from amateur or collegiate programs, often representing leading American clubs rather than a permanent national team.

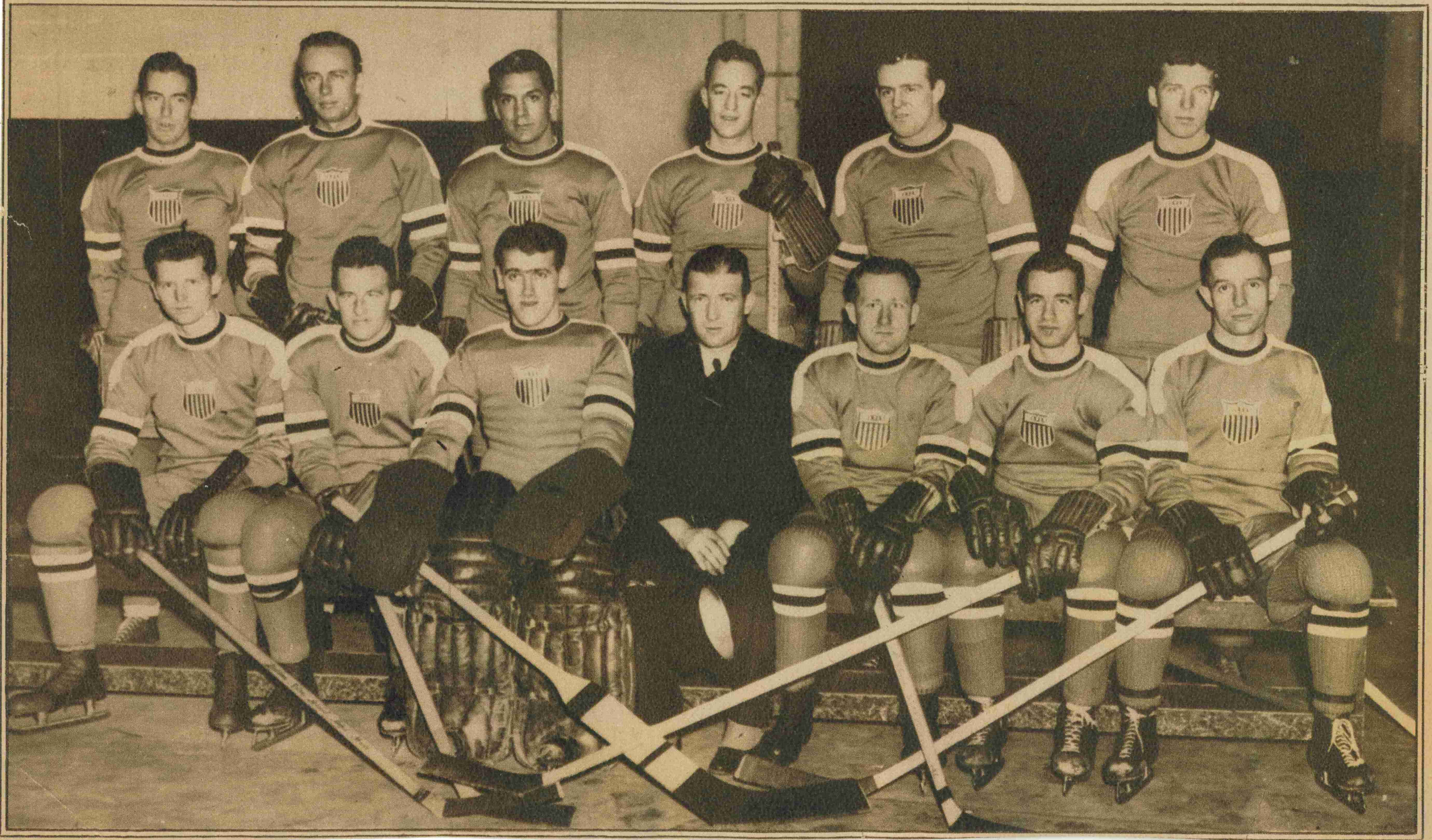
The 1936 US Olympic team

In 1933, the United States won its first IIHF World Championship title when the Massachusetts Rangers (aka Boston Olympics) defeated Canada in Prague. Sherman Forbes scored early, but the game remained deadlocked after regulation until John Garrison netted the winning goal in a mandatory 10-minute overtime. The US squad, coached by Walter A. Brown and backed by goaltender Gerry Cosby, edged Canada–a perennial powerhouse–to claim gold in front of some 12,000 spectators.

Following their breakthrough in 1933, the United States remained a consistent contender on the international stage but often fell just short of the top prize. The Americans earned silver medals at the 1934, 1939, and 1950 IIHF World Championships, as well as at the 1952 and 1956 Winter Olympics. Many of these squads were built around standout amateur and collegiate players–such as University of Minnesota star John Mayasich, who led the US in scoring at the 1956 Cortina d'Ampezzo Games.

=== Olympic gold medals ===
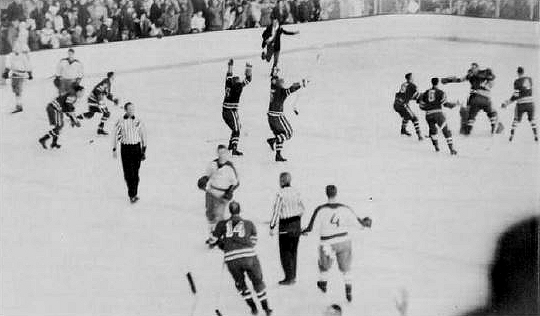
The United States against the Soviet Union in the final round of the 1960 Winter Olympics

The United States claimed gold at the 1960 Winter Olympics in Squaw Valley, California. At those Games, the Americans captured gold by defeating teams including the Soviet Union, Canada, Czechoslovakia, and Sweden. Because this achievement was later overshadowed by the more famous 1980 victory in Lake Placid, the 1960 championship became known as the "Forgotten Miracle."

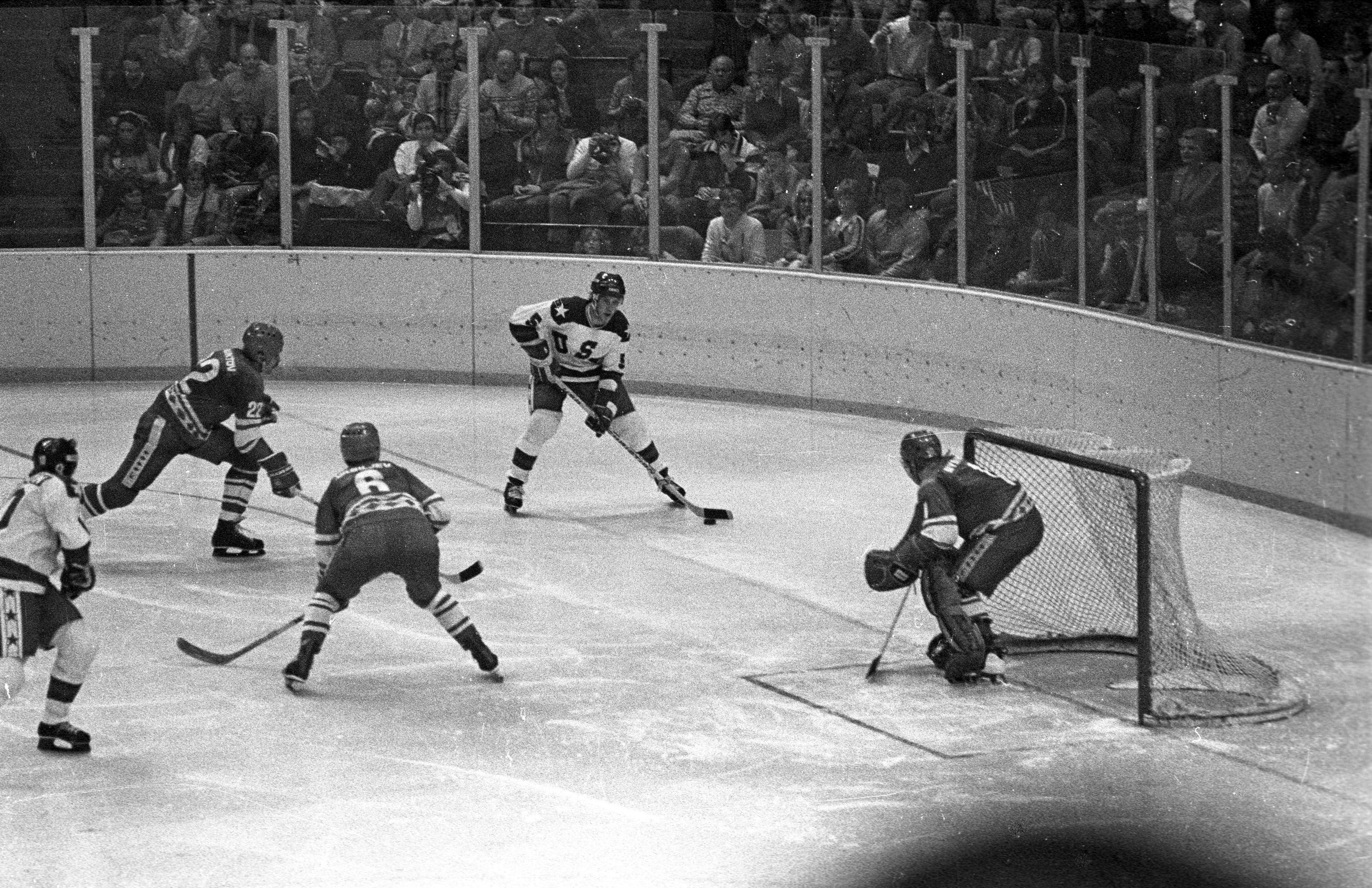
Mike Ramsey handling the puck in the Miracle on Ice game

The American ice hockey team's greatest success was the "Miracle on Ice" at the 1980 Winter Olympics in Lake Placid, New York, when American college players defeated the heavily favored seasoned professionals from the Soviet Union on the way to a gold medal. Though ice hockey is not a major sport in most areas of the United States, the "Miracle" is often listed as one of the all-time greatest American sporting achievements. The US clinched the gold medal by defeating Finland in the final game. Under the leadership of coach Herb Brooks, forward Mark Johnson led the team in scoring, while goaltender Jim Craig led all netminders in both saves and save percentage. The team's improbable triumph later inspired the critically acclaimed 2004 film Miracle, which brought the story of the "Miracle on Ice" to a new generation of fans.

=== World Cup of Hockey championship and NHL involvement ===
The United States ice hockey team experienced a spike in talent in the 1980s and 1990s, with future NHL stars (many who would later be inducted into the Hockey Hall of Fame) including Tony Amonte, Chris Chelios, Derian Hatcher, Brett Hull, Pat LaFontaine, John LeClair, Brian Leetch, Mike Modano, Mike Richter, Jeremy Roenick, Kevin Stevens, Keith Tkachuk, and Doug Weight. Although the US finished no higher than fourth in any World or Olympic event from 1981 through 1994 (unlike other teams that used professionals, the US team was limited to amateurs at these tournaments), that long drought set the stage for a breakthrough on hockey's biggest professional stage. After a runner-up finish in the 1991 Canada Cup, the Americans finally broke through with a landmark victory at the 1996 World Cup of Hockey, the first edition of the tournament that replaced the Canada Cup. Coached by Ron Wilson, Team USA stunned the hockey world by defeating a powerhouse Canadian squad in a best-of-three final. After dropping Game 1, the Americans stormed back with two straight wins on Canadian ice, including a dramatic 5–2 clincher in Montreal. Goaltender Mike Richter delivered a legendary performance, turning aside a barrage of shots and earning tournament MVP honors, while Brett Hull paced the offense with seven goals and Tony Amonte netted the series-winning goal late in Game 3. Captain Chris Chelios anchored a formidable blue line that also featured Brian Leetch, while a deep forward corps led by Keith Tkachuk, John LeClair, and Mike Modano overwhelmed opponents with speed and scoring depth. The victory marked the United States' first senior men's title in a best-on-best tournament, signifying a coming of age for American hockey and proving that the US could defeat Canada and the world's elite on the international stage.

Six years later, after the International Olympic Committee and NHL arranged to accommodate an Olympic break in the NHL schedule, the US earned a silver medal at the 2002 Winter Olympics with a roster that included NHL stars Adam Deadmarsh, Chris Drury, Brian Rafalski, and Brian Rolston. However, by 2006, many of these NHL players had retired or had declined with age. Though the 2006 Olympic team finished a disappointing 8th, it was more of a transitional team, featuring young NHL players like Rick DiPietro, John-Michael Liles, and Jordan Leopold.

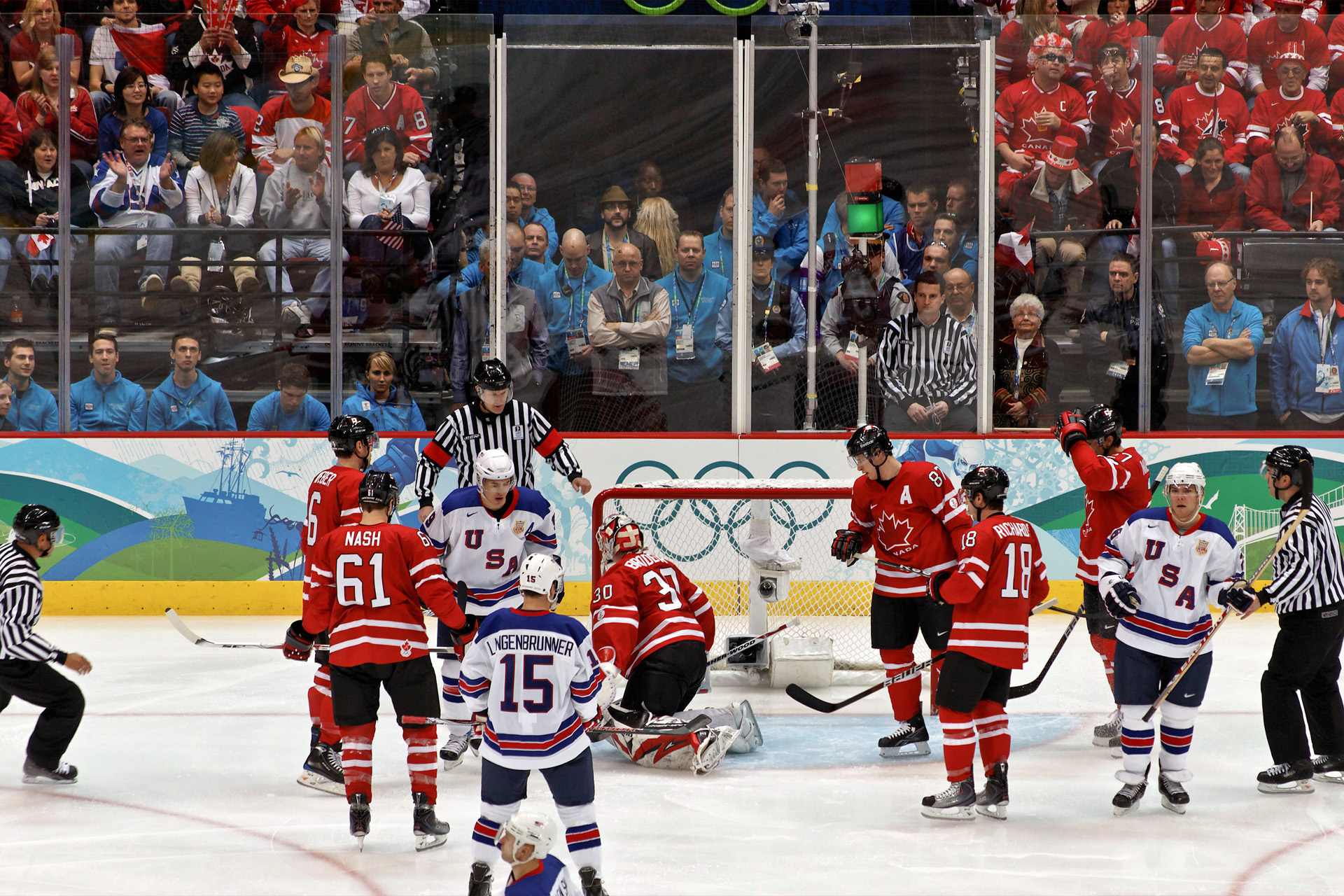
Team USA taking on Canada at the 2010 Winter Olympics

The 2010 US Olympic team was composed of much younger and faster players than teams of previous years, including David Backes, Dustin Brown, Jack Johnson, Patrick Kane, Phil Kessel, Zach Parise, Joe Pavelski, Bobby Ryan, Paul Stastny, and Ryan Suter. The team also had a solid group of veterans that included such stars as goalie Ryan Miller, defenseman Brian Rafalski, and team captain Jamie Langenbrunner. The US team upset Team Canada 5–3 in the round-robin phase of the tournament and went into the single elimination phase of the tournament as the number-one seeded team. After beating Finland 6–1, the US advanced to the gold medal game, where they lost in overtime 3–2 to Canada to claim the silver medal. The gold medal game between Canada and the US was watched by an estimated 27.6 million US households. This was the most watched hockey game in America since the 1980 "Miracle on Ice" game, including any Stanley Cup Final or NHL Winter Classic broadcast.

The United States finished fourth at the 2014 Winter Olympics, falling to Finland in the bronze medal game. In a preliminary-round game against Russia, T. J. Oshie became the centerpiece of one of the most memorable shootouts in Olympic history. With the game tied 2–2 after regulation and overtime, Team USA coach Dan Bylsma repeatedly turned to Oshie against Russian goaltender Sergei Bobrovsky. Oshie opened the shootout as the first of three initial shooters, followed by James van Riemsdyk and Joe Pavelski. When the score remained deadlocked after the first three rounds, international rules allowed coaches to reuse shooters – and Bylsma kept sending Oshie. The American forward took five consecutive attempts, converting four of his six total shots, including the eighth-round winner that sealed a 3–2 US victory.

=== NHL players out ===
The NHL pulled out of the Olympics for the 2018 competition in a dispute over insurance and the IOC's ambush marketing restrictions, prohibiting the national teams from inviting any player it held under contract. The American team was put at a particular disadvantage, as more than 31% of NHL players are Americans (in comparison, only 4.1% are Russians). As a result, the US entered the tournament with a hastily assembled team of free agents, players from European leagues, AHLers on one-way contracts, and college players. The team proved unsuccessful, losing to Slovenia and the Olympic Athletes from Russia in the preliminary round and being eliminated by the Czech Republic in the quarterfinals. The Russian team benefited most from NHL's absence and ultimately won the tournament with a team that was composed primarily of SKA Saint Petersburg and HC CSKA Moscow players from the Russia-based KHL and featured ex-NHL all-stars Pavel Datsyuk, Ilya Kovalchuk and Vyacheslav Voynov (all SKA).

On March 31, 2021, Stan Bowman was appointed the general manager of the US Olympic men's hockey team for the 2022 Beijing Games. On October 26, 2021, Bowman resigned in response to the results of an independent investigation into allegations of sexual assault committed by a member of the Blackhawks' video coaching staff. The lead investigator stated that Bowman's failure to report the alleged assault had eventually led to the perpetrator committing further acts of sexual abuse.

With the NHL pulling out at the last minute due to scheduling issues caused by the COVID-19 pandemic, the United States finished fifth at the 2022 Winter Olympics, after a stunning shootout loss to Slovakia, marking their third consecutive Olympic Games without a medal. Despite fielding a team of mostly NCAA players, the team went undefeated in the preliminary round, highlighted by a victory over rival Canada, before falling in the quarterfinals.

=== NHL players return and success ===
In February 2024, Bill Guerin was announced as general manager of Team USA for the 2025 4 Nations Face-Off and 2026 Winter Olympics. In May, Mike Sullivan was named head coach of the team for both competitions. The Four Nations Face-Off marked the first best-on-best international ice hockey competition since the 2016 World Cup of Hockey, ending an almost decade-long drought brought on by the NHL's failure to stage any international tournament since 2016, the league's decision not to release players for the Olympic Games, and the regular absence of top stars from the IIHF World Championships due to NHL playoff obligations or personal choice. The tournament was an NHL-exclusive event, meaning only NHL players were eligible to compete, and notably, Russia was excluded because of its ongoing IIHF ban due to the war in Ukraine. The opening game against Canada set an intense tone immediately, as three fights erupted within the first nine seconds, sparked by brothers Matthew and Brady Tkachuk. Team USA captured a spirited 3–1 victory in that contest, but ultimately fell to Canada 3–2 in overtime in the championship game. Despite the narrow defeat, the United States demonstrated that it remained a top contender heading into the next Winter Olympics, which would once again feature NHL players after a 12-year hiatus.

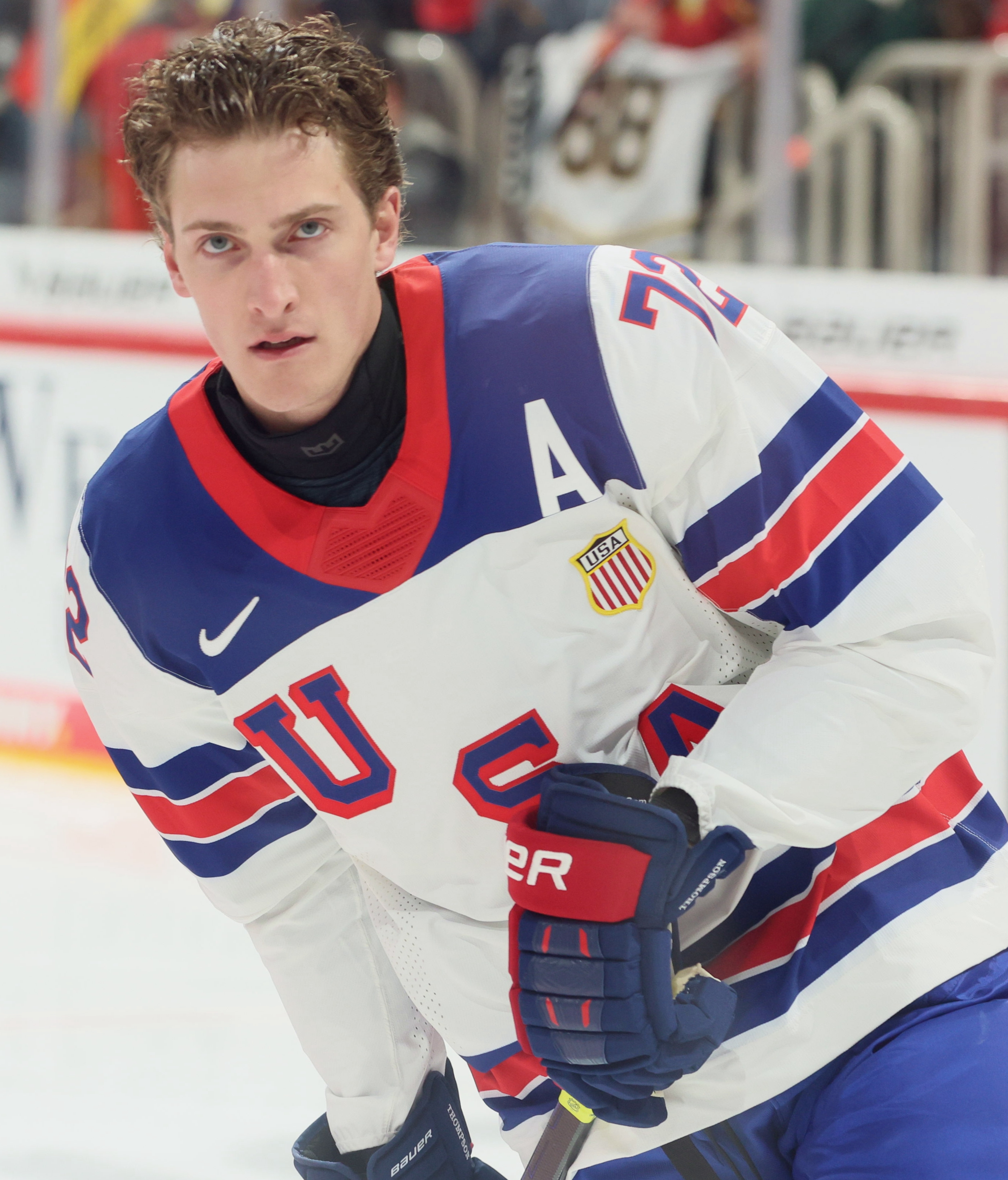
Tage Thompson at the 2025 IIHF World Championship, where he scored the overtime-winning goal to secure the United States' first World Championship since 1933

In 2025, the United States captured its first IIHF World Championship title since 1933, defeating Switzerland in the gold-medal game to end a remarkable 92-year drought. The Americans' 1960 Olympic gold is also officially recognized by the IIHF as a world championship as all Olympic tournaments prior to 1968 also served as World Championships, but the 2025 win marked the nation's first title at a standalone tournament since 1933. Tage Thompson scored the overtime game-winner against Switzerland to secure the historic win.

At the 2026 Winter Olympics, Team USA built upon its momentum from the previous year and captured its first Olympic gold medal since 1980. The United States finished the tournament with a perfect 6–0 record, earning notable playoff round victories over Sweden and Slovakia before defeating Canada 2–1 in overtime in the gold medal game. Jack Hughes scored the overtime winner to secure the championship, while goaltender Connor Hellebuyck made 41 saves on 42 shots, including a key stick save on Devon Toews late in regulation. The victory marked not only the United States' first Olympic gold medal in men's hockey since the "Miracle on Ice" in 1980, but also its first major best-on-best international tournament title featuring NHL players since the 1996 World Cup of Hockey. Hellebuyck and defenseman Quinn Hughes were both named to the Media All-Star Team, with Hellebuyck recognized as the tournament's top goaltender and Hughes as its top defenseman. During the on-ice celebration, the American players honored Johnny Gaudreau by holding his jersey and including his two children in the team photo.

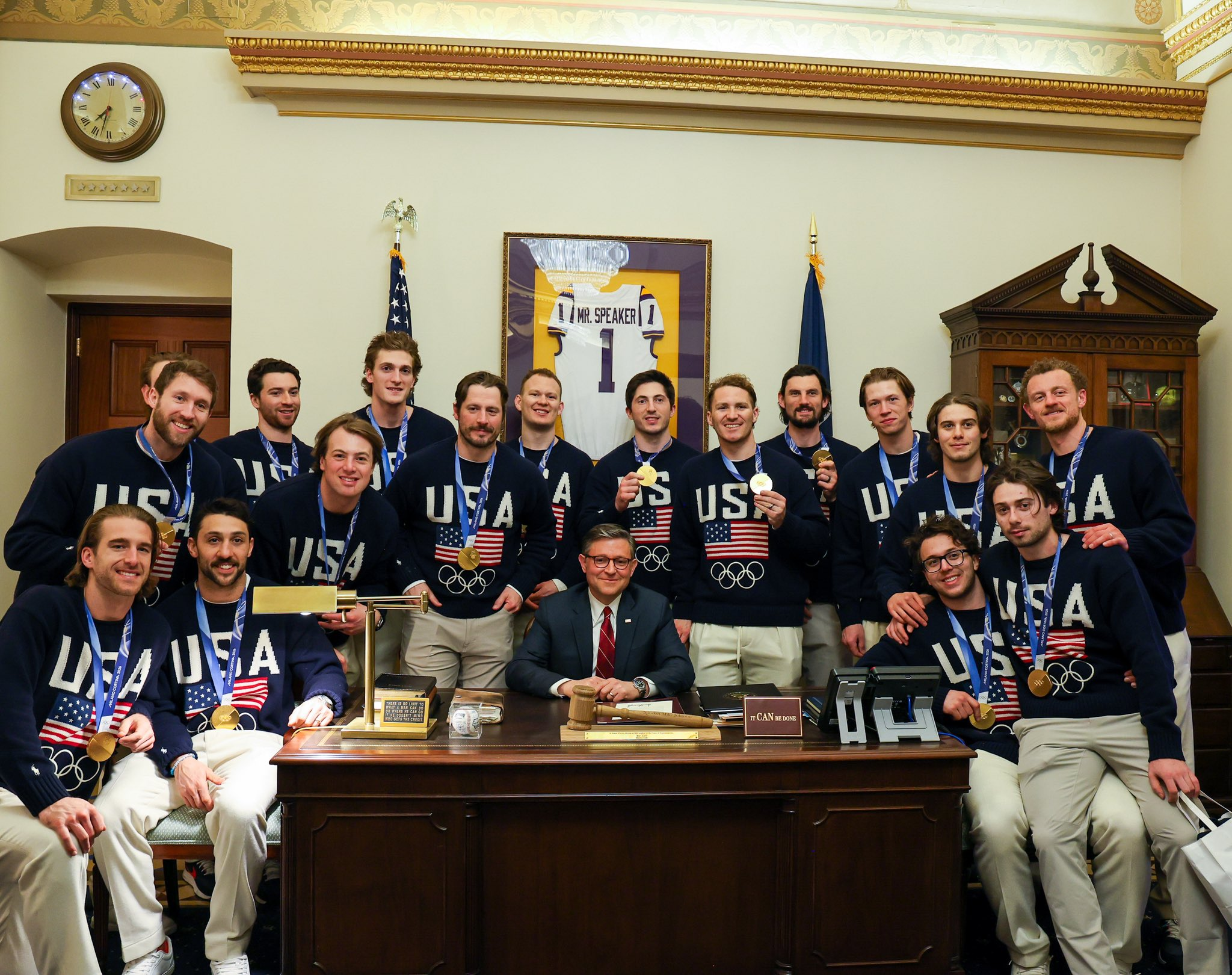
Members of the 2026 Olympic team posing with House Speaker Mike Johnson during visit to the White House

Following the game, the team was criticism for allowing FBI director Kash Patel into their locker room to celebrate, and a phone call with Donald Trump joking about appearing with the U.S. Women's Olympic team. The majority of the team accepted the invitation to attend the 2026 State of the Union Address and visit the White House, while the women's team declined. During the address Trump announced that Hellebuyck would be awarded the Presidential Medal of Freedom.

== Competitive record ==
=== Olympic Games ===
Games	GP	W	L	T	GF	GA	Coach	Captain	Round	Position
(Belgium) 1920 Antwerp	4	3	1	0	52	2	Cornelius Fellowes; Roy Schooley	Joe McCormick	Silver medal round	Silver
(France) 1924 Chamonix	5	4	1	0	73	6	William S. Haddock	Irving Small	Final round	Silver
(Switzerland) 1928 St. Moritz	Did not participate									
(United States) 1932 Lake Placid	6	4	1	1	27	5	Alfred Winsor	John Chase	Final round	Silver
(Germany) 1936 Garmisch-Partenkirchen	8	5	2	1	10	4	Albert Prettyman	John Garrison	Final round	Bronze
(Switzerland) 1948 St. Moritz	8	5	3	0	86	33	John Garrison	Goodwin Harding	Round-robin	4th, DSQ
(Norway) 1952 Oslo	8	6	1	1	43	21	Connie Pleban	Allen Van	Round-robin	Silver
(Italy) 1956 Cortina d'Ampezzo	7	5	2	0	33	16	John Mariucci	Gene Campbell	Final round	Silver
(United States) 1960 Squaw Valley	7	7	0	0	48	17	Jack Riley	Jack Kirrane	Final round	Gold
(Austria) 1964 Innsbruck	7	2	5	0	29	33	Eddie Jeremiah	Herb Brooks; Bill Reichart	Round-robin	5th
(France) 1968 Grenoble	7	2	4	1	23	28	Murray Williamson	Lou Nanne	Round-robin	6th
(Japan) 1972 Sapporo	6	4	2	0	23	18	Murray Williamson	Tim Sheehy	Round-robin	Silver
(Austria) 1976 Innsbruck	6	3	3	0	23	25	Bob Johnson	John Taft	Round-robin	5th
(United States) 1980 Lake Placid	7	6	0	1	33	15	Herb Brooks	Mike Eruzione	Final round	Gold
(Socialist Federal Republic of Yugoslavia) 1984 Sarajevo	6	2	2	2	23	21	Lou Vairo	Phil Verchota	7th place game	7th
(Canada) 1988 Calgary	6	3	3	0	35	31	Dave Peterson	Brian Leetch	7th place game	7th
(France) 1992 Albertville	8	5	2	1	25	19	Dave Peterson	Clark Donatelli	Bronze medal game	4th
(Norway) 1994 Lillehammer	8	1	4	3	28	32	Tim Taylor	Peter Laviolette	7th place game	8th
(Japan) 1998 Nagano	4	1	3	0	9	14	Ron Wilson	Chris Chelios	Quarter-finals	6th
(United States) 2002 Salt Lake City	6	4	1	1	26	10	Herb Brooks	Chris Chelios	Gold medal game	Silver
(Italy) 2006 Turin	6	1	4	1	16	17	Peter Laviolette	Chris Chelios	Quarter-finals	8th
(Canada) 2010 Vancouver	6	5	1	—	24	9	Ron Wilson	Jamie Langenbrunner	Gold medal game	Silver
(Russia) 2014 Sochi	6	4	2	—	20	12	Dan Bylsma	Zach Parise	Bronze medal game	4th
(South Korea) 2018 Pyeongchang	5	2	3	—	11	12	Tony Granato	Brian Gionta	Quarter-finals	7th
(China) 2022 Beijing	4	3	1	—	17	7	David Quinn	Andy Miele	Quarter-finals	5th
(Italy) 2026 Milan / Cortina d'Ampezzo	6	6	0	—	26	9	Mike Sullivan	Auston Matthews	Gold medal game	Gold
(France) 2030 French Alps	Future event									
(United States) 2034 Utah	Future event									

==== Results by "Big Six" opponent ====
Opponents	Played	Won	Tied	Lost	Biggest victory	Biggest defeat
Canada	20	5	3	12	4–1	3–12
Czechoslovakia/ Czech Republic	21	10	0	11	16–0	1–7
Finland	13	7	2	4	8–2, 6–0	1–6, 0–5
Soviet Union/ CIS/ Russia	14	4	1	9	4–3, 3–2 (x3)	2–10
Sweden	16	7	2	7	20–0	1–5
Total	83	32	8	43	20–0	3–12

=== World Championships ===
Note: Between 1920 and 1968, the Olympic ice hockey tournament was also considered the World Championship for that year.
Note: World War II forced cancellation of all tournaments from 1940 to 1946.
Note: In 1972, a separate tournament was held both for the World Championships and the Winter Olympics for the first time.
Note: No World Championships were held during the Olympic years 1980, 1984, and 1988.
Note: The 2020 tournament was cancelled due to the COVID-19 pandemic.

- 1920 – Silver
- 1924 – Silver
- 1928 – did not participate
- 1930 – did not participate
- 1931 – Silver
- 1932 – Silver
- 1933 – Gold
- 1934 – Silver
- 1935 – did not participate
- 1936 – Bronze
- 1937 – did not participate
- 1938 – 7th place
- 1939 – Silver
- 1947 – 5th place
- 1948 – 4th place
- 1949 – Bronze
- 1950 – Silver
- 1951 – 6th place
- 1952 – Silver
- 1953 – did not participate
- 1954 – did not participate
- 1955 – 4th place
- 1956 – Silver
- 1957 – did not participate
- 1958 – 5th place
- 1959 – 4th place
- 1960 – Gold
- 1961 – 6th place
- 1962 – Bronze
- 1963 – 8th place
- 1964 – 5th place
- 1965 – 6th place
- 1966 – 6th place
- 1967 – 5th place
- 1968 – 6th place
- 1969 – 6th place (relegated to Group B)
- 1970 – 7th place (1st in Group B, promoted to Group A)
- 1971 – 6th place (relegated to Group B)
- 1972 – 8th place (2nd in Group B)
- 1973 – 8th place (2nd in Group B)
- 1974 – 7th place (1st in Group B, promoted to Group A)
- 1975 – 6th place
- 1976 – 4th place
- 1977 – 6th place
- 1978 – 6th place
- 1979 – 7th place
- 1981 – 5th place
- 1982 – 8th place (relegated to Group B)
- 1983 – 9th place (1st in Group B, promoted to Group A)
- 1985 – 4th place
- 1986 – 6th place
- 1987 – 7th place
- 1989 – 6th place
- 1990 – 5th place
- 1991 – 4th place
- 1992 – 7th place
- 1993 – 6th place
- 1994 – 4th place
- 1995 – 6th place
- 1996 – Bronze
- 1997 – 6th place
- 1998 – 12th place
- 1999 – 6th place
- 2000 – 5th place
- 2001 – 4th place
- 2002 – 7th place
- 2003 – 13th place
- 2004 – Bronze
- 2005 – 6th place
- 2006 – 7th place
- 2007 – 5th place
- 2008 – 6th place
- 2009 – 4th place
- 2010 – 13th place
- 2011 – 8th place
- 2012 – 7th place
- 2013 – Bronze
- 2014 – 6th place
- 2015 – Bronze
- 2016 – 4th place
- 2017 – 5th place
- 2018 – Bronze
- 2019 – 7th place
- 2021 – Bronze
- 2022 – 4th place
- 2023 – 4th place
- 2024 – 5th place
- 2025 – Gold
- 2026 – 8th place
- 2027 –

=== Canada Cup / World Cup of Hockey ===
Event	GP	W	L	T	GF	GA	Coach	Captain	Round	Position
1976	5	1	3	1	14	21	Bob Pulford	Bill Nyrop	Group stage	5th
1981	6	2	3	1	18	23	Bob Johnson	Robbie Ftorek	Semi-finals	4th
1984	6	3	2	1	23	22	Bob Johnson	Rod Langway	Semi-finals	4th
1987	5	2	3	0	13	14	Bob Johnson	Rod Langway	Group stage	5th
1991	8	5	3	0	29	26	Bob Johnson	Joel Otto	Finals	2nd
1996	7	6	1	0	37	18	Ron Wilson	Brian Leetch	Finals	Gold
2004	5	2	3	0	11	11	Ron Wilson	Chris Chelios	Semi-finals	4th
2016	3	0	3	—	5	11	John Tortorella	Joe Pavelski	Group stage	7th
2028	Future event									

==== Results by "Big Six" opponent ====
Opponents	Played	Won	Tied	Lost	Biggest victory	Biggest defeat
Canada	14	3	1	10	5–2 (x2)	3–8
Czechoslovakia/ Czech Republic	6	3	1	2	6–2	1–3
Finland	6	4	1	1	7–3	1–2
Soviet Union/ CIS/ Russia	9	4	0	5	5–2 (x2)	0–5
Sweden	6	4	0	2	7–1	2–9
Total	41	18	3	20	7–1	2–9

=== 4 Nations Face-Off ===
Games	GP	W	L	GF	GA	Coach	Captain	Position
2025	4	2	2	12	7	Mike Sullivan	Auston Matthews	2nd

== Team ==
=== Current roster ===
Roster for the 2026 IIHF World Championship.

Head coach: Don Granato

No.	Pos.	Name	Height	Weight	Birthdate	Team
1	G	Devin Cooley	1.95 m (6 ft 5 in)	87 kg (192 lb)	25 August 1997 (age 29)	(Canada) Calgary Flames
7	D	Ryan Ufko	1.78 m (5 ft 10 in)	82 kg (181 lb)	7 May 2003 (age 23)	(United States) Milwaukee Admirals
9	F	Ryan Leonard	1.85 m (6 ft 1 in)	93 kg (205 lb)	21 January 2005 (age 21)	(United States) Washington Capitals
10	F	James Hagens	1.80 m (5 ft 11 in)	80 kg (180 lb)	3 November 2006 (age 20)	(United States) Boston Bruins
11	F	Oliver Moore	1.80 m (5 ft 11 in)	85 kg (187 lb)	22 January 2005 (age 21)	(United States) Chicago Blackhawks
15	F	Tommy Novak	1.85 m (6 ft 1 in)	81 kg (179 lb)	28 April 1997 (age 29)	(United States) Pittsburgh Penguins
16	D	Mason Lohrei	1.95 m (6 ft 5 in)	100 kg (220 lb)	17 January 2001 (age 25)	(United States) Boston Bruins
17	D	Will Borgen	1.91 m (6 ft 3 in)	90 kg (200 lb)	19 December 1996 (age 29)	(United States) New York Rangers
18	F	Sam Lafferty	1.88 m (6 ft 2 in)	93 kg (205 lb)	6 March 1995 (age 31)	(United States) Chicago Blackhawks
19	F	Matthew Tkachuk	1.88 m (6 ft 2 in)	91 kg (201 lb)	11 December 1997 (age 28)	(United States) Florida Panthers
21	F	Alex Steeves	1.83 m (6 ft 0 in)	90 kg (200 lb)	10 December 1999 (age 26)	(United States) Boston Bruins
22	F	Isaac Howard	1.78 m (5 ft 10 in)	82 kg (181 lb)	30 March 2004 (age 22)	(United States) Bakersfield Condors
24	F	Mathieu Olivier – A	1.85 m (6 ft 1 in)	105 kg (231 lb)	11 February 1997 (age 29)	(United States) Columbus Blue Jackets
26	F	Max Plante	1.80 m (5 ft 11 in)	82 kg (181 lb)	20 February 2006 (age 20)	(United States) Minnesota Duluth Bulldogs
27	F	Matt Coronato	1.78 m (5 ft 10 in)	83 kg (183 lb)	14 November 2002 (age 24)	(Canada) Calgary Flames
33	G	Drew Commesso	1.88 m (6 ft 2 in)	82 kg (181 lb)	19 July 2002 (age 24)	(United States) Rockford IceHogs
44	D	Wyatt Kaiser	1.83 m (6 ft 0 in)	86 kg (190 lb)	31 July 2002 (age 24)	(United States) Chicago Blackhawks
47	F	Paul Cotter	1.88 m (6 ft 2 in)	97 kg (214 lb)	16 November 1999 (age 27)	(Canada) Vancouver Canucks
55	D	Ryan Lindgren – A	1.83 m (6 ft 0 in)	88 kg (194 lb)	11 February 1998 (age 28)	(United States) Seattle Kraken
60	G	Joseph Woll	1.91 m (6 ft 3 in)	96 kg (212 lb)	12 July 1998 (age 28)	(Canada) Toronto Maple Leafs
63	F	Max Sasson	1.85 m (6 ft 1 in)	82 kg (181 lb)	5 September 2000 (age 26)	(Canada) Vancouver Canucks
67	D	Declan Carlile	1.91 m (6 ft 3 in)	86 kg (190 lb)	18 May 2000 (age 26)	(United States) Tampa Bay Lightning
72	D	Justin Faulk – C	1.83 m (6 ft 0 in)	98 kg (216 lb)	20 March 1992 (age 34)	(United States) Detroit Red Wings
75	D	Connor Clifton	1.83 m (6 ft 0 in)	89 kg (196 lb)	28 April 1995 (age 31)	(United States) Pittsburgh Penguins
82	F	Danny Nelson	1.91 m (6 ft 3 in)	100 kg (220 lb)	3 August 2005 (age 21)	(United States) Notre Dame Fighting Irish

=== 2026 Olympics roster ===
The first six players of the United States' roster were announced on 16 June 2025. The remainder of the roster was revealed on 2 January 2026. On 21 January, defenseman Seth Jones was ruled out due to injury, and was replaced by Jackson LaCombe. On 8 February, Auston Matthews was named captain, with Charlie McAvoy and Matthew Tkachuk serving as alternate captains.

Head coach: Mike Sullivan

No.	Pos.	Name	Height	Weight	Birthdate	Team
1	G	Jeremy Swayman	1.91 m (6 ft 3 in)	88 kg (194 lb)	24 November 1998 (aged 27)	(United States) Boston Bruins
2	D	Jackson LaCombe	1.88 m (6 ft 2 in)	93 kg (205 lb)	9 January 2001 (aged 25)	(United States) Anaheim Ducks
7	F	Brady Tkachuk	1.93 m (6 ft 4 in)	102 kg (225 lb)	16 September 1999 (aged 26)	(United States) Florida Panthers
8	D	Zach Werenski	1.88 m (6 ft 2 in)	98 kg (216 lb)	19 July 1997 (aged 28)	(United States) Columbus Blue Jackets
9	F	Jack Eichel	1.88 m (6 ft 2 in)	94 kg (207 lb)	28 October 1996 (aged 29)	(United States) Vegas Golden Knights
10	F	J. T. Miller	1.85 m (6 ft 1 in)	95 kg (209 lb)	14 March 1993 (aged 32)	(United States) New York Rangers
12	F	Matt Boldy	1.88 m (6 ft 2 in)	91 kg (201 lb)	5 April 2001 (aged 24)	(United States) Minnesota Wild
14	D	Brock Faber	1.85 m (6 ft 1 in)	91 kg (201 lb)	22 August 2002 (aged 23)	(United States) Minnesota Wild
15	D	Noah Hanifin	1.91 m (6 ft 3 in)	93 kg (205 lb)	25 January 1997 (aged 29)	(United States) Vegas Golden Knights
16	F	Vincent Trocheck	1.80 m (5 ft 11 in)	85 kg (187 lb)	11 July 1993 (aged 32)	(United States) New York Rangers
19	F	Matthew Tkachuk – A	1.88 m (6 ft 2 in)	91 kg (201 lb)	11 December 1997 (aged 28)	(United States) Florida Panthers
21	F	Dylan Larkin	1.85 m (6 ft 1 in)	93 kg (205 lb)	30 July 1996 (aged 29)	(United States) Detroit Red Wings
25	D	Charlie McAvoy – A	1.85 m (6 ft 1 in)	95 kg (209 lb)	21 December 1997 (aged 28)	(United States) Boston Bruins
29	F	Brock Nelson	1.93 m (6 ft 4 in)	93 kg (205 lb)	15 October 1991 (aged 34)	(United States) Colorado Avalanche
30	G	Jake Oettinger	1.98 m (6 ft 6 in)	102 kg (225 lb)	18 December 1998 (aged 27)	(United States) Dallas Stars
34	F	Auston Matthews – C	1.91 m (6 ft 3 in)	98 kg (216 lb)	17 September 1997 (aged 28)	(Canada) Toronto Maple Leafs
37	G	Connor Hellebuyck	1.93 m (6 ft 4 in)	94 kg (207 lb)	19 May 1993 (aged 32)	(Canada) Winnipeg Jets
43	D	Quinn Hughes	1.78 m (5 ft 10 in)	82 kg (181 lb)	14 October 1999 (aged 26)	(United States) Minnesota Wild
59	F	Jake Guentzel	1.80 m (5 ft 11 in)	82 kg (181 lb)	6 October 1994 (aged 31)	(United States) Tampa Bay Lightning
72	F	Tage Thompson	1.98 m (6 ft 6 in)	100 kg (220 lb)	30 October 1997 (aged 28)	(United States) Buffalo Sabres
74	D	Jaccob Slavin	1.91 m (6 ft 3 in)	94 kg (207 lb)	1 May 1994 (aged 31)	(United States) Carolina Hurricanes
81	F	Kyle Connor	1.85 m (6 ft 1 in)	83 kg (183 lb)	9 December 1996 (aged 29)	(Canada) Winnipeg Jets
85	D	Jake Sanderson	1.88 m (6 ft 2 in)	92 kg (203 lb)	8 July 2002 (aged 23)	(Canada) Ottawa Senators
86	F	Jack Hughes	1.80 m (5 ft 11 in)	80 kg (176 lb)	14 May 2001 (aged 24)	(United States) New Jersey Devils
91	F	Clayton Keller	1.78 m (5 ft 10 in)	79 kg (174 lb)	29 July 1998 (aged 27)	(United States) Utah Mammoth

=== IIHF World Championship directorate awards ===
The IIHF has given awards for each year's championship tournament to the top goalie, defenseman, and forward (all since 1954), and most valuable player (since 2004). The following American team members have won awards.

- 1955 – Don Rigazio (goalie)
- 1956 – Willard Ikola (goalie)
- 1959 – Bill Cleary (forward)
- 1960 – Jack McCartan (goalie)
- 1962 – John Mayasich (defenseman)
- 1967 – Carl Wetzel (goalie)
- 2004 – Ty Conklin (goalie)
- 2014 – Seth Jones (defenseman)
- 2018 – Patrick Kane (MVP)
- 2021 – Cal Petersen (goalie)
- 2025 – Zach Werenski (defenseman)

== Uniform evolution ==
National team uniforms

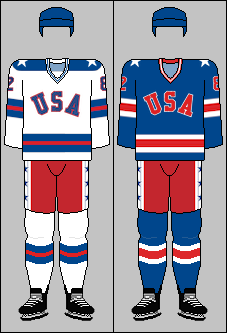
1980 Olympic uniforms

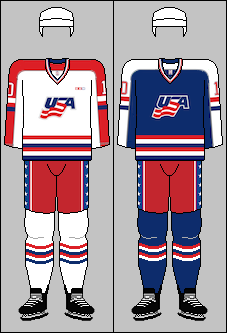
1988 Olympic uniforms

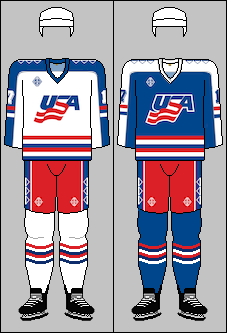
1989–1992 uniforms

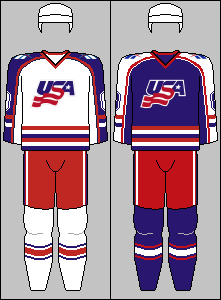
1994 Olympic uniforms

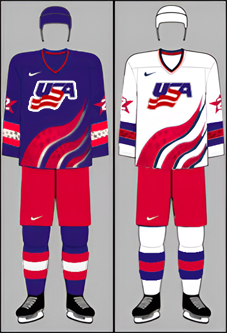
1996 WCH uniforms

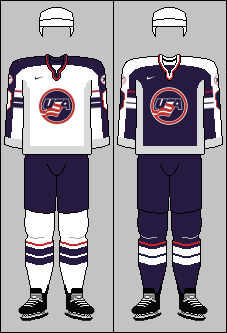
1998 Olympic uniforms, later used at IIHF tournaments in 1998–2000

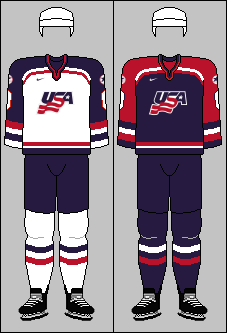
2001–2004 uniforms

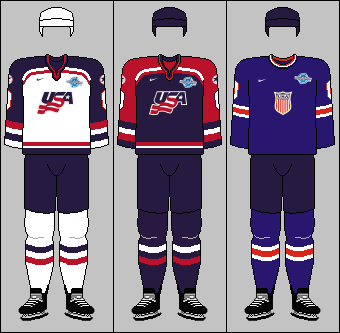
2004 WCH uniforms

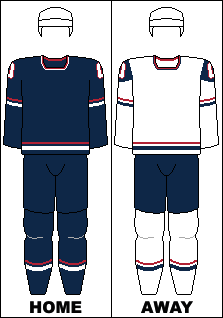
2013 IIHF uniforms (no USA Hockey logo)

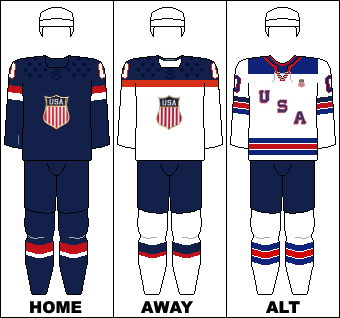
2014 Olympic uniforms

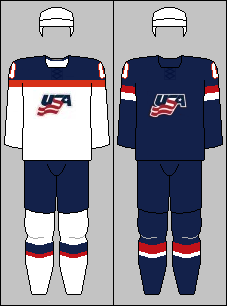
IIHF uniforms 2014–2017

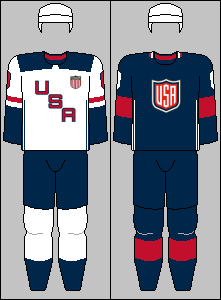
2016 WCH uniforms

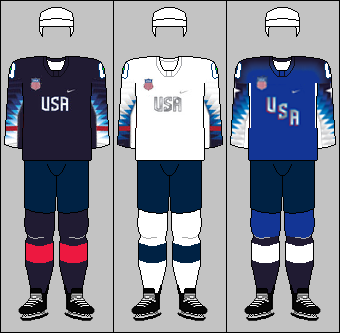
2018 Olympic uniforms

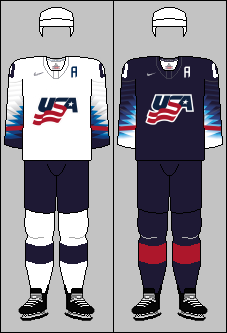
IIHF uniforms 2018–2021

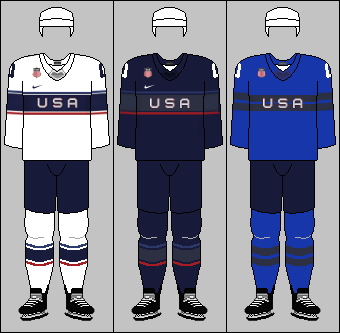
2022 Olympic uniforms

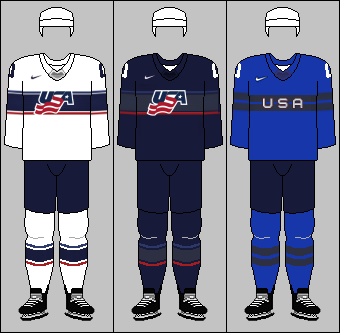
IIHF uniforms 2022–2024

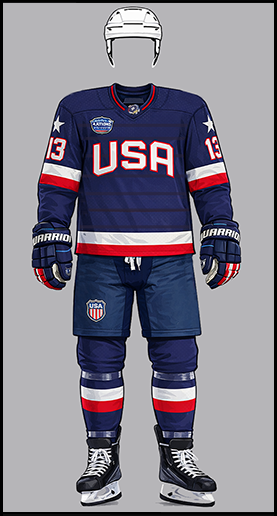
4 Nations Face-Off uniform

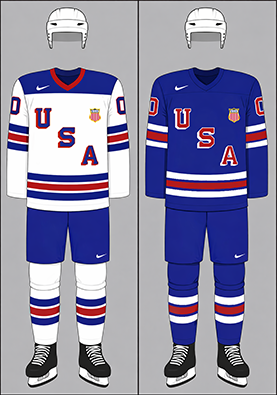
IIHF uniforms 2025–present

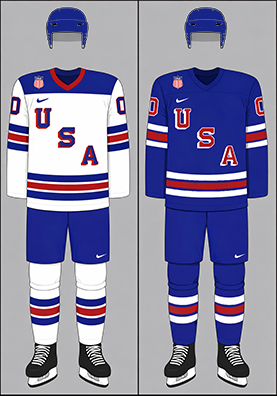
2026 Olympic uniforms

== See also ==
- List of United States national ice hockey team rosters
- List of Olympic men's ice hockey players for the United States
