= 1939–40 Lehigh Engineers men's ice hockey season =

- Home ice: Albeth Ice Rink

Record
- Overall: 1–4–0
- Conference: 1–3–0
- Road: 1–1–0
- Neutral: 0–3–0

Coaches and captains
- Head coach: Charles W. Simmons
- Captain: Wes Sawyer
- Alternate captain: Ed Dannemiller

The 1939–40 Lehigh Engineers men's ice hockey season was the inaugural season of play for the program. The Engineers represented Lehigh University and were coached by Charles W. Simmons in his 1st season.

== Season ==
After receiving financial backing from the university, the ice hockey team was able to become a varsity squad for the first time in 1939. The outfit also joined the newly formed Pennsylvania Intercollegiate Hockey League, however, since the circuit included non-collegiate team it was only an informal conference. Lehigh began the season well with a credible performance against Penn, followed by their first win over the Cubs. At the time, Ray Anderson was leading the league scoring with 5 points, however, the team's offense dried up after that. The Engineers scored just 4 goals in their final three games and ended the season on a down note, getting thumped by Penn State 2–8.

W. Rodman Turner served as team manager with Allen H. Zane and Arthur L. Fisher as assistants.

== Roster ==
No.	Nat.	Player	Class	Pos	Height	Weight	DoB	Hometown	Previous team
	(United States)	James L. Anderson	Junior	D				New York, New York
	(United States)	Raymond B. Anderson Jr.	Sophomore	F				West Newton, Massachusetts
	(United States)	Robert E. Ashley	Sophomore	F				Muskegon, Michigan
	(United States)	William L. Clark	Junior	F				Mountain Lakes, New Jersey
	(United States)	Leonard R. Constantine	Sophomore	F			1921-02-20	The Bronx, New York
	(United States)	Edwin F. Dannemiller (A)	Senior	F				Garden City, New York
	(United States)	Robert E. Goodman	Sophomore	D				New Rochelle, New York
	(United States)	Freeman P. McKay	Freshman	G				Somerville, New Jersey
	(United States)	Douglas C. Paul	Senior	D				Bethlehem, Pennsylvania
	(United States)	Edwin H. Scott	Senior	F				Elizabeth, New Jersey
	(United States)	Joseph D. Scott	Sophomore	F				Millburn, New Jersey
	(United States)	Warren E. Sawyer III (C)	Senior	F/D				Primos, Pennsylvania
	(United States)	J. Edward Stopp	Sophomore	F			1912-08-28	Philadelphia, Pennsylvania
	(United States)	Hulme W. Thomas	Senior	F			1918-07-16	Allentown, Pennsylvania
	(United States)	Alex K. Wiggan	Sophomore	F				East Orange, New Jersey

== Standings ==
1939–40 Eastern Collegiate ice hockey standings
	Intercollegiate							Overall					
	GP	W	L	T	Pct.	GF	GA	GP	W	L	T	GF	GA
Army	–	–	–	–	–	–	–	10	6	2	2	35	37
Boston College	–	–	–	–	–	–	–	18	12	5	1	121	70
Boston University	11	4	4	3	.500	45	44	12	4	5	3	50	50
Bowdoin	–	–	–	–	–	–	–	6	1	5	0	–	–
Clarkson	–	–	–	–	–	–	–	19	10	8	1	112	80
Colgate	–	–	–	–	–	–	–	13	9	4	0	–	–
Cornell	11	5	6	0	.455	35	61	11	5	6	0	35	61
Dartmouth	–	–	–	–	–	–	–	18	9	7	2	80	80
Hamilton	–	–	–	–	–	–	–	13	9	4	0	–	–
Harvard	–	–	–	–	–	–	–	14	3	10	1	–	–
Lafayette	1	1	0	0	1.000	3	1	4	1	3	0	12	21
Lehigh	2	0	2	0	.000	2	8	5	1	4	0	11	21
Middlebury	–	–	–	–	–	–	–	13	2	10	1	–	–
MIT	–	–	–	–	–	–	–	15	6	9	0	–	–
New Hampshire	–	–	–	–	–	–	–	10	1	9	0	22	51
Northeastern	–	–	–	–	–	–	–	11	7	4	0	–	–
Norwich	–	–	–	–	–	–	–	8	4	3	1	–	–
Princeton	–	–	–	–	–	–	–	19	9	7	3	–	–
St. Lawrence	–	–	–	–	–	–	–	9	1	8	0	–	–
Syracuse	–	–	–	–	–	–	–	–	–	–	–	–	–
Union	–	–	–	–	–	–	–	8	5	3	0	–	–
Williams	–	–	–	–	–	–	–	11	6	5	0	–	–
Yale	–	–	–	–	–	–	–	20	10	6	4	–	–

== Schedule and results ==
Date	Opponent	Site	Result	Record
Regular Season
January 5	vs. Pennsylvania ^{†}	Hershey Sports Arena • Hershey, Pennsylvania	L 2–4	0–1–0
January 9	at Hershey Junior Cubs	Hershey Sports Arena • Hershey, Pennsylvania	W 5–1	1–1–0
January 27	at Army*	Smith Rink • West Point, New York	L 1–5	1–2–0
February 23	vs. Lafayette	Hershey Sports Arena • Hershey, Pennsylvania	L 1–3	1–3–0
March 1	vs. Penn State ^{†}	Hershey Sports Arena • Hershey, Pennsylvania	L 2–8	1–4–0
*Non-conference game. ^{#}Rankings from USCHO.com Poll.

† Both Pennsylvania and Penn State fielded club teams at this time.
