= 1939–40 Lafayette Leopards men's ice hockey season =

- Conference: Independent

Record
- Overall: 1–3–0
- Road: 0–1–0
- Neutral: 1–2–0

Coaches and captains
- Head coach: Henry W. Clark

The 1939–40 Lafayette Leopards men's ice hockey season was the 3rd season of play for the program. The Leopards represented Lafayette College and were coached by Henry W. Clark in his 4th seasons.

== Season ==
After a year as an unofficial squad, the schools announced that they would be recognizing the ice hockey team as official representatives of the school in November 1939. Now fully supported by the school the team was able to join the Hershey Intercollegiate League made up of other clubs in eastern Pennsylvania. While Lafayette was the only varsity program of the lot, they would play against several other colleges throughout the year. With the early announcement, Lafayette was also able to start their season much earlier than they had in previous years and played their first game in November.

Unfortunately, it took a long time for the Leopards to play their second game and they didn't hit the ice against until February. They did, however, use the off time well and performed much better than their rivals, Lehigh. Though Lafayette won the game, they received some unwelcome news that star defenseman, Frank Murphy, may be recalled by the Royal Canadian Air Force and be lost for the year. While Murphy remained with the team, he wasn't able to help them stave off defeat from their next two opponents. Lafayette dropped both games and ended up finishing near the bottom of the league standings.

After the season, a team made up of players from both Lafayette and Lehigh travelled to Philadelphia where they lost to a similar all-star squad 3–2.

== Roster ==
No.	Nat.	Player	Class	Pos	Height	Weight	DoB	Hometown	Previous team
		John Allen	Senior
		Bonzey
		Goldberg	Junior
		Griffiths
		Hardings
		Henderson		F
		Jack Henry	Freshman
		Kleinknecht		F
		Ray Milici	Freshman
	(Canada)	Frank Murphy	Senior	D				Montreal, Quebec
		Palmer
		Quinn	Freshman	F
		Reoch	Freshman
		Charlie Scofield	Graduate	D
		Bob Sweeney
		Dick Sweeney
		Gail Wait		G

== Standings ==
1939–40 Eastern Collegiate ice hockey standings
	Intercollegiate							Overall					
	GP	W	L	T	Pct.	GF	GA	GP	W	L	T	GF	GA
Army	–	–	–	–	–	–	–	10	6	2	2	35	37
Boston College	–	–	–	–	–	–	–	18	12	5	1	121	70
Boston University	11	4	4	3	.500	45	44	12	4	5	3	50	50
Bowdoin	–	–	–	–	–	–	–	6	1	5	0	–	–
Clarkson	–	–	–	–	–	–	–	19	10	8	1	112	80
Colgate	–	–	–	–	–	–	–	13	9	4	0	–	–
Cornell	11	5	6	0	.455	35	61	11	5	6	0	35	61
Dartmouth	–	–	–	–	–	–	–	18	9	7	2	80	80
Hamilton	–	–	–	–	–	–	–	13	9	4	0	–	–
Harvard	–	–	–	–	–	–	–	14	3	10	1	–	–
Lafayette	1	1	0	0	1.000	3	1	4	1	3	0	12	21
Lehigh	2	0	2	0	.000	2	8	5	1	4	0	11	21
Middlebury	–	–	–	–	–	–	–	13	2	10	1	–	–
MIT	–	–	–	–	–	–	–	15	6	9	0	–	–
New Hampshire	–	–	–	–	–	–	–	10	1	9	0	22	51
Northeastern	–	–	–	–	–	–	–	11	7	4	0	–	–
Norwich	–	–	–	–	–	–	–	8	4	3	1	–	–
Princeton	–	–	–	–	–	–	–	19	9	7	3	–	–
St. Lawrence	–	–	–	–	–	–	–	9	1	8	0	–	–
Syracuse	–	–	–	–	–	–	–	–	–	–	–	–	–
Union	–	–	–	–	–	–	–	8	5	3	0	–	–
Williams	–	–	–	–	–	–	–	11	6	5	0	–	–
Yale	–	–	–	–	–	–	–	20	10	6	4	–	–

== Schedule and results ==
Date	Opponent	Site	Result	Record
Regular Season
November 30	at Hershey Junior Cubs	Hershey Sports Arena • Hershey, Pennsylvania	L 5–7	0–1–0 (0–1–0)
February 23	vs. Lehigh	Hershey Sports Arena • Hershey, Pennsylvania	W 3–1	1–1–0 (1–1–0)
March 2	vs. Pennsylvania	Hershey Sports Arena • Hershey, Pennsylvania	L 2–6	1–2–0 (1–2–0)
March	vs. Penn State	Hershey Sports Arena • Hershey, Pennsylvania	L 2–7	1–3–0 (1–3–0)
*Non-conference game. ^{#}Rankings from USCHO.com Poll.
