= 1936–37 Cornell Big Red men's ice hockey season =

Intercollegiate hockey season

- Home ice: Beebe Lake

Record
- Overall: 1–1–0
- Neutral: 1–1–0

Coaches and captains
- Head coach: Nick Bawlf
- Captain: William Simpson

The 1936–37 Cornell Big Red men's ice hockey season was the 30th season of play for the program. The teams was coached by Nick Bawlf in his 15th season.

== Season ==
The Cornell season got under way earlier than normal as the Big Red had scheduled two games in late-December at the Playland Casino Rink. The team split its two-game set in Rye and the defense performed well in both games.

Unfortunately for Cornell, Beebe Lake was completely unusable after Christmas and the team wasn't able to get in any practice time, let along play a game until their first scheduled road game in late-January. Coach Bawlf thought better of sending his unprepared team up against the powerful Clarkson team and the game was cancelled. The two games in December ended up being the only matches played all year as the weather continued to be trouble for the Big Red.

== Roster ==
No.	Nat.	Player	Class	Pos	Height	Weight	DoB	Hometown	Previous team
	(Canada)	Charles Acton		D				Shawinigan Falls, Quebec
	(United States)	Jack Babson		W				Yonkers, New York
	(United States)	Albert Bosson	Sophomore	G				Cambridge, Massachusetts
	(United States)	Ernest Dahman	Junior	F			1915-10-02	Ithaca, New York
	(United States)	Sam Dugan	Senior	F				Hamburg, New York
	(United States)	Grant Ehrlich		D				Chicago, Illinois
	(United States)	Oliver Gildersleeve		F			1917-01-22	Portland, Connecticut
	(United States)	John Hoene		D				St. Louis County, Minnesota
	(United States)	Frederick Huntington		D				Nassau County, New York
	(United States)	Myles MacMahon		F				Montclair, New Jersey
		William Simpson (C)		F

== Standings ==
1936–37 Eastern Collegiate ice hockey standings
	Intercollegiate							Overall					
	GP	W	L	T	Pct.	GF	GA	GP	W	L	T	GF	GA
Army	–	–	–	–	–	–	–	10	5	5	0	27	22
Boston College	–	–	–	–	–	–	–	13	8	4	1	70	42
Boston University	14	8	6	0	.571	50	55	14	8	6	0	50	55
Bowdoin	–	–	–	–	–	–	–	7	1	6	0	–	–
Brown	–	–	–	–	–	–	–	10	6	4	0	–	–
Clarkson	–	–	–	–	–	–	–	9	6	3	0	50	26
Colgate	–	–	–	–	–	–	–	7	4	3	0	–	–
Cornell	2	1	1	0	.500	5	3	2	1	1	0	5	3
Dartmouth	–	–	–	–	–	–	–	25	12	13	0	114	117
Hamilton	–	–	–	–	–	–	–	7	1	6	0	–	–
Harvard	–	–	–	–	–	–	–	16	15	1	0	–	–
Lafayette	0	0	0	0	–	0	0	2	1	1	0	6	9
Massachusetts State	–	–	–	–	–	–	–	6	3	3	0	–	–
Middlebury	–	–	–	–	–	–	–	9	5	3	1	–	–
MIT	–	–	–	–	–	–	–	12	1	11	0	–	–
New Hampshire	–	–	–	–	–	–	–	8	3	5	0	21	34
Northeastern	–	–	–	–	–	–	–	10	6	3	1	–	–
Princeton	–	–	–	–	–	–	–	17	6	11	0	–	–
Rensselaer	–	–	–	–	–	–	–	1	0	1	0	–	–
Union	–	–	–	–	–	–	–	6	1	5	0	–	–
Williams	–	–	–	–	–	–	–	9	5	3	1	–	–
Yale	–	–	–	–	–	–	–	16	5	11	0	–	–

== Schedule and results ==
Date	Opponent	Site	Result	Record
Regular season
December 28	vs. Colgate*	Playland Casino Rink • Rye, New York	L 1–2	0–1–0
December 29	vs. Union*	Playland Casino Rink • Rye, New York	W 4–1	1–1–0
*Non-conference game.
