= 1933 Ice Hockey World Championships =

1933 edition of the World Ice Hockey Championships

Tournament details
- Host country: Czechoslovakia
- Venue: 1 (in 1 host city)
- Dates: 18–26 February
- Teams: 12

Final positions
- Champions: United States (1st title)
- Runners-up: Canada
- Third place: Czechoslovakia
- Fourth place: Austria

Tournament statistics
- Games played: 33
- Goals scored: 115 (3.48 per game)
- Scoring leader: (Czechoslovakia) Josef Malecek 13 points

The 1933 Ice Hockey World Championships were held between February 18 and February 26, 1933, in Prague, Czechoslovakia.

By winning its first-ever world championship, the United States deprived Canada of the world title for the first time in tournament history. The American team, the Massachusetts Rangers, was mostly made up of university students and led by standout performances of Gerry Cosby in goal and team captain Ben Langmaid on defence. Canada was represented by the Toronto National Sea Fleas, winners of the 1932 Allan Cup, and coached by the controversial hockey personality Harold Ballard. The teams met on February 26 at Zimní stadión on Štvanice island. Tied 1-1 after 45 minutes of regulation time on goals by Sherman Forbes for the United States and an equalizer by Canadian Tim Kerr, defenceman John Garrison beat Canadian goalie Ron Geddes at the 6-minute mark of a dramatic "non-sudden death" overtime period.

Ten nations played in three groups, with the top two in each group advancing to the second round to join Canada and the United States, who both were automatically qualified through to the next round. In the second round, eight teams played in two groups; the top two teams from each group advancing to the semifinals, where the top qualifier in each group were seeded against the second qualifier in the opposing group. The winners of the semifinal matches played in the gold medal game, while the losers played for third place.

Fifth and sixth places were decided by a match between the third-place finishers in the two second ground groups; similarly seventh and eighth places were decided between the two last-place finishers in the second round groups. For the final four places, two classification matches were played between the bottom four finishers in the first round, which provided the seedings for the ninth and eleventh-place matches.

== First round ==
=== Group A ===
Pos	Team	Pld	W	D	L	GF	GA	GD	Pts	Qualification
1	Czechoslovakia	3	3	0	0	13	2	+11	6	Advanced to Second Round
2	Austria	3	2	0	1	11	3	+8	4	Advanced to Second Round
3	Italy	3	1	0	2	3	6	−3	2	Advanced to Consolation Matches
4	Romania	3	0	0	3	1	17	−16	0	Advanced to Consolation Matches

Updated to match(es) played on unknown. Source:

Date		Result		P1	P2	P3
18 Feb	Austria	3 - 0	Italy	0 - 0	2 - 0	1 - 0
18 Feb	Czechoslovakia	8 - 0	Romania	2 - 0	4 - 0	2 - 0
19 Feb	Italy	2 - 0	Romania	1 - 0	1 - 0	0 - 0
19 Feb	Czechoslovakia	2 - 1	Austria	1 - 1	1 - 0	0 - 0
20 Feb	Austria	7 - 1	Romania	2 - 1	3 - 0	2 - 0
20 Feb	Czechoslovakia	3 - 1	Italy	1 - 0	1 - 1	1 - 0

=== Group B ===
Pos	Team	Pld	W	D	L	GF	GA	GD	Pts	Qualification
1	Germany	2	2	0	0	8	0	+8	4	Advanced to Second Round
2	Poland	2	1	0	1	1	2	−1	2	Advanced to Second Round
3	Belgium	2	0	0	2	0	7	−7	0	Advanced to Consolation Matches

Updated to match(es) played on unknown. Source:

Date		Result		P1	P2	P3
18 Feb	Germany	6 - 0	Belgium	1 - 0	3 - 0	2 - 0
19 Feb	Germany	2 - 0	Poland	0 - 0	1 - 0	1 - 0
20 Feb	Poland	1 - 0	Belgium	0 - 0	0 - 0	1 - 0

=== Group C ===
Pos	Team	Pld	W	D	L	GF	GA	GD	Pts	Qualification
1	Switzerland	2	2	0	0	6	1	+5	4	Advanced to Second Round
2	Hungary	2	1	0	1	3	1	+2	2	Advanced to Second Round
3	Latvia	2	0	0	2	1	8	−7	0	Advanced to Consolation Matches

Updated to match(es) played on unknown. Source:

Date		Result		P1	P2	P3
18 Feb	Switzerland	5 - 1	Latvia	3- 0	1 - 0	1 - 1
19 Feb	Switzerland	1 - 0	Hungary	1 - 0	0 - 0	0 - 0
20 Feb	Hungary	3 - 0	Latvia	1 - 0	1 - 0	1 - 0

== Second round ==
=== Group D ===
Pos	Team	Pld	W	D	L	GF	GA	GD	Pts	Qualification
1	Canada	3	3	0	0	12	1	+11	6	Advanced to Semi-finals
2	Austria	3	2	0	1	3	4	−1	4	Advanced to Semi-finals
3	Germany	3	1	0	2	4	7	−3	2	Advanced to 5th/6th Place Play-off
4	Hungary	3	0	0	3	1	8	−7	0	Advanced to 7th/8th Place Play-off

Updated to match(es) played on unknown. Source:

Date		Result		P1	P2	P3	OT1	OT2	OT3
21 Feb	Austria	1 - 0	Hungary	0 - 0	0 - 0	0 - 0	0 - 0	0 - 0	1 - 0
21 Feb	Canada	5 - 0	Germany	1 - 0	2 - 0	2 - 0			
22 Feb	Germany	4 - 0	Hungary	2 - 0	0 - 0	2 - 0			
22 Feb	Canada	4 - 0	Austria	0 - 0	2 - 0	2 - 0			
23 Feb	Canada	3 - 1	Hungary	1 - 0	1 - 0	1 - 1			
23 Feb	Austria	2 - 0	Germany	0 - 0	0 - 0	2 - 0			

=== Group E ===
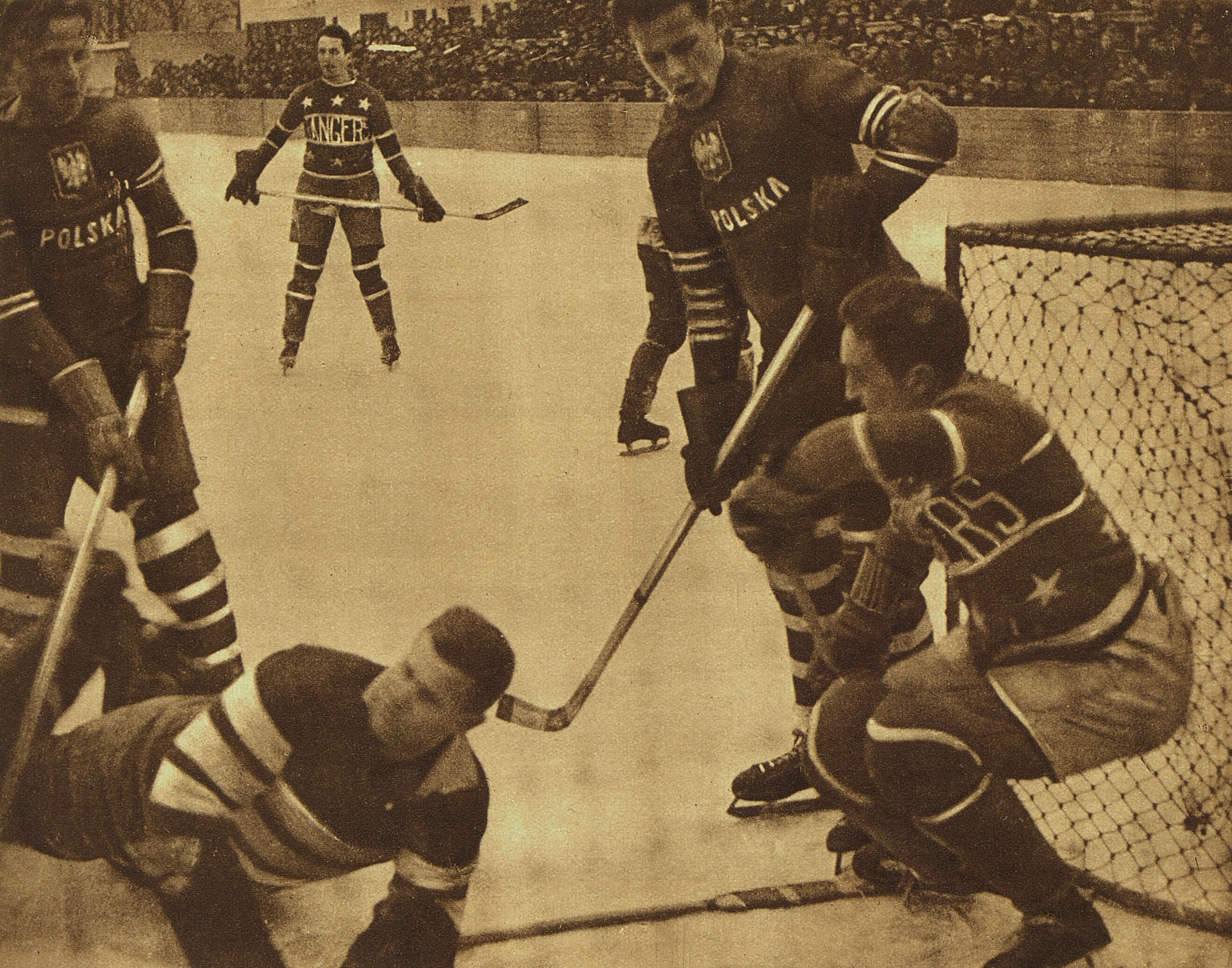
USA-Poland at in Prague

Pos	Team	Pld	W	D	L	GF	GA	GD	Pts	Qualification
1	United States	3	3	0	0	17	0	+17	6	Advanced to Semi-finals
2	Czechoslovakia	3	2	0	1	2	6	−4	4	Advanced to Semi-finals
3	Switzerland	3	1	0	2	3	9	−6	2	Advanced to 5th/6th Place Play-off
4	Poland	3	0	0	3	1	8	−7	0	Advanced to 7th/8th Place Play-off

Updated to match(es) played on unknown. Source:

Date		Result		P1	P2	P3
21 Feb	United States	7 - 0	Switzerland	1 - 0	2 - 0	4 - 0
21 Feb	Czechoslovakia	1 - 0	Poland	1 - 0	0 - 0	0 - 0
22 Feb	United States	4 - 0	Poland	3 - 0	0 - 0	1 - 0
22 Feb	Czechoslovakia	1 - 0	Switzerland	1 - 0	0 - 0	0 - 0
23 Feb	Switzerland	3 - 1	Poland	2 - 0	0 - 1	1 - 0
23 Feb	United States	6 - 0	Czechoslovakia	1 - 0	4 - 0	1 - 0

== Third round ==
=== Consolation Matches ===
Date		Result		P1	P2	P3
24 Feb	Romania	3 - 2	Belgium	2 - 2	1 - 0	0 - 0
24 Feb	Latvia	2 - 0	Italy	1 - 0	0 - 0	1 - 0

- Romania and Latvia qualified for the 9th/10th Place play-off, Belgium and Italy qualified for the 11th/12th Place play-off.

=== Semi-Finals ===
Date		Result		P1	P2	P3
25 Feb	United States	4 - 0	Austria	2 - 0	2 - 0	0 - 0
25 Feb	Canada	4 - 0	Czechoslovakia	2 - 0	1 - 0	1 - 0

- USA and Canada qualified for the Gold Medal Match, Austria and Czechoslovakia qualified for the Bronze Medal Match.

== Final round ==
=== 11th/12th Place play-off ===
Date		Result		P1	P2	P3
25 Feb	Italy	W / O	Belgium			

- Belgium declined to play, so Italy were awarded the win.

=== 9th/10th Place play-off ===
Date		Result		P1	P2	P3
25 Feb	Romania	1 - 0	Latvia	1 - 0	0 - 0	0 - 0

=== 7th/8th Place play-off ===
Date		Result		P1	P2	P3
24 Feb	Hungary	1 - 1	Poland	0 - 0	0 - 1	1 - 0

=== 5th/6th Place play-off ===
Date		Result		P1	P2	P3
24 Feb	Germany	1 - 1	Switzerland	0 - 0	1 - 1	0 - 0

=== Bronze Medal Match ===
Date		Result		P1	P2	P3	OT1	OT2
26 Feb	Czechoslovakia	2 - 0	Austria	0 - 0	0 - 0	0 - 0	0 - 0	2 - 0

=== Gold Medal Match ===
Date		Result		P1	P2	P3	OT
26 Feb	United States	2 - 1	Canada	1 - 1	0 - 0	0 - 0	1 - 0

== Final Rankings – World Championship ==
RF	Team
1	United States
2	Canada
3	Czechoslovakia
4	Austria
5	Germany
5	Switzerland
7	Hungary
7	Poland
9	Romania
10	Latvia
11	Italy
12	Belgium

=== Championship team ===
Medal	Country	Players
Gold	United States	Gerry Cosby, John Garrison, Ben Langmaid, Winthrop Palmer, Frank Holland, Larry Sanford, Channing Hillard, Stewart Iglehart, Sherman Forbes, Jim Breckinridge; Trainer: Walter A. Brown

== Legacy ==
The United States' oldest active college hockey award, the Walter Brown Award, was created in 1953 to commemorate the 20th anniversary of this championship team and its coach, the eponymous Walter A. Brown.
A team photograph, and a gold medal on loan from the family of Sherman Forbes, are currently on display at The Sports Museum in Boston, Massachusetts.

== Sources ==
- Complete results
- IIHF 100 top stories number 78
- Duplacey, James (1998). Total Hockey: The official encyclopedia of the National Hockey League. Total Sports. pp. 498–528. ISBN 0-8362-7114-9.
- Podnieks, Andrew (2010). IIHF Media Guide & Record Book 2011. Moydart Press. pp. 26, 124.
