= 1939–40 Cornell Big Red men's ice hockey season =

Intercollegiate hockey season

- Home ice: Beebe Lake

Record
- Overall: 5–6–0
- Home: 1–0–0
- Road: 2–3–0
- Neutral: 2–3–0

Coaches and captains
- Head coach: Nick Bawlf
- Captain: Ray McElwee

The 1939–40 Cornell Big Red men's ice hockey season was the 33rd season of play for the program. The teams were coached by Nick Bawlf in his 18th season.

== Season ==
The Big Red received good news at the start of the season. Not only would the team begin the year with several games at two tournaments but, unlike the previous season, the team received financial support from the organizing committee to balance out the cost of participating. The only bad news at the time was the (typical) warm winter that prevented the team from getting any on-ice practice. The lack of ice time led directly to two rather embarrassing losses at Playland. While the first to Colgate wasn't pretty, the game against Boston College was a debacle; BC blew out Cornell 24–1. It was by far the worst loss in the history of the program and did not portend well for the rest of their season.

The team headed to Lake Placid less than a week later and showed a dramatic improvement in such a short time. Their quarterfinal match against Hamilton provided the team with its first win on the season. While they lost the semifinal to MIT, Cornell recovered in the consolation game for a 3rd-place finish. The result of the tournament showed, if nothing else, that Cornell wasn't nearly as bad as the BC game may have indicated, they just hadn't gotten their skating legs. As if to further illustrate that point, Cornell had a rematch with Colgate a week after the Lake Placid Invitational. While they still lost to the Red Raiders, the score was a much more respectable 1–3. Cornell continued to improve as the season went on, ending the week with their third win against St. Lawrence. Warm weather forced the game to be shortened to 50 minutes but the Big Red were able to produce five goals in that span.

The next game for Cornell was originally scheduled for the 27th of January, however, the game had to be postponed because it would have taken place during the exam period for Syracuse University. The Orange game was eventually played, occurring after both schools had finished with their semester exams, and ended up giving Cornell their 4th win of the season. With several games remaining on their schedule, the Big Red were one away from posting the second most wins in program history and the most since winning the intercollegiate championship in 1911. The team wanted to get ready for their next match against Army, however, weather again became a problem and melted the ice on Beebe Lake to the point where the team couldn't get in any training time. They fought hard against the Cadets, forcing the game into overtime, but ultimately fell 3–4.

Cornell's next match was supposed to be a third meeting with Colgate. Unfortunately, the ice on Beebe Lake was still too soft and the game was called off. The lack of practice time caught up to Cornell in their penultimate match when Hamilton knocked the team down and prevented Cornell from a chance at a winning season. Cornell was able to end its season on a high note, shutting out Syracuse in the rematch at the end of February. Despite finishing with a losing record, the Big Red would not win as many games in a season for over 20 years.

== Roster ==
No.	Nat.	Player	Class	Pos	Height	Weight	DoB	Hometown	Previous team
	(United States)	Glen Allen		F				Canandaigua, New York
	(United States)	Jack Babson	Junior	F				Yonkers, New York
		Eckert
	(United States)	Richard Franklin		D				LaPorte, Indiana
		Carl Geiger		F
		Bill Houck		F
	(United States)	Clark Kimball						Watertown, New York
	(United States)	Richard Lahey						Brooklyn, New York
	(United States)	Ray McElwee (C)	Senior	D				Ithaca, New York
	(United States)	Kenneth Reed	Junior	F			1920-05-21	Ithaca, New York
	(United States)	Ward Wannop	Sophomore	G				Fleischmanns, New York
	(United States)	Wilbur Wannop	Sophomore					Fleischmanns, New York
	(United States)	Robert Wiggans		D			1918-04-17	Ithaca, New York

== Standings ==
1939–40 Eastern Collegiate ice hockey standings
	Intercollegiate							Overall					
	GP	W	L	T	Pct.	GF	GA	GP	W	L	T	GF	GA
Army	–	–	–	–	–	–	–	10	6	2	2	35	37
Boston College	–	–	–	–	–	–	–	18	12	5	1	121	70
Boston University	11	4	4	3	.500	45	44	12	4	5	3	50	50
Bowdoin	–	–	–	–	–	–	–	6	1	5	0	–	–
Clarkson	–	–	–	–	–	–	–	19	10	8	1	112	80
Colgate	–	–	–	–	–	–	–	13	9	4	0	–	–
Cornell	11	5	6	0	.455	35	61	11	5	6	0	35	61
Dartmouth	–	–	–	–	–	–	–	18	9	7	2	80	80
Hamilton	–	–	–	–	–	–	–	13	9	4	0	–	–
Harvard	–	–	–	–	–	–	–	14	3	10	1	–	–
Lafayette	1	1	0	0	1.000	3	1	4	1	3	0	12	21
Lehigh	2	0	2	0	.000	2	8	5	1	4	0	11	21
Middlebury	–	–	–	–	–	–	–	13	2	10	1	–	–
MIT	–	–	–	–	–	–	–	15	6	9	0	–	–
New Hampshire	–	–	–	–	–	–	–	10	1	9	0	22	51
Northeastern	–	–	–	–	–	–	–	11	7	4	0	–	–
Norwich	–	–	–	–	–	–	–	8	4	3	1	–	–
Princeton	–	–	–	–	–	–	–	19	9	7	3	–	–
St. Lawrence	–	–	–	–	–	–	–	9	1	8	0	–	–
Syracuse	–	–	–	–	–	–	–	–	–	–	–	–	–
Union	–	–	–	–	–	–	–	8	5	3	0	–	–
Williams	–	–	–	–	–	–	–	11	6	5	0	–	–
Yale	–	–	–	–	–	–	–	20	10	6	4	–	–

== Schedule and results ==
Date	Opponent	Site	Result	Record
Regular season
December 26	vs. Colgate*	Playland Ice Rink • Rye, New York	L 2–9	0–1–0
December 27	vs. Boston College*	Playland Ice Rink • Rye, New York	L 1–24	0–2–0
Lake Placid Invitational Tournament
January 1	vs. Hamilton*	Jack Shea Arena • Lake Placid, New York (Quarterfinal)	W 5–4	1–2–0
January 2	vs. MIT*	Jack Shea Arena • Lake Placid, New York (Semifinal)	L 3–5	1–3–0
January 3	vs. Middlebury*	Jack Shea Arena • Lake Placid, New York (Consolation Game)	W 4–2	2–3–0
Regular season
January 10	at Colgate*	Hamilton, New York	L 1–3	2–4–0
January 13	at St. Lawrence*	St. Lawrence Rink • Canton, New York	W 5–3	3–4–0
February 9	Syracuse*	Beebe Lake • Ithaca, New York	W 4–1	4–4–0
February 17	at Army*	Smith Rink • West Point, New York	L 3–4 ^{OT}	4–5–0
February 24	at Hamilton*	Russell Sage Rink • Clinton, New York	L 3–6	4–6–0
February 29	at Syracuse*	Archbold Rink • Syracuse, New York	W 4–0	5–6–0
*Non-conference game.
