= 1939–40 John Carroll Blue Streaks men's ice hockey season =

Penn-Ohio League, Champion Penn-Ohio League Tournament, Champion
- Conference: 1st Penn-Ohio League
- Home ice: Cleveland Arena

Record
- Overall: 15–0–0
- Conference: 13–0–0
- Home: 5–0–0
- Road: 3–0–0
- Neutral: 7–0–0

Coaches and captains
- Head coach: Herb Bee
- Assistant coaches: Ed Joseph
- Captain(s): Eddie Arsenault; Fred Rancourt

The 1939–40 John Carroll Blue Streaks men's ice hockey season was the 3rd season of play for the program.

== Season ==
After losing Baldwin Wallace and Pittsburgh before the start of the season, the Penn-Ohio League had to adjust swiftly. The Divisional alignment was abandoned and John Carroll' schedule was rearranged so they would face the Cleveland teams three times each and the Pittsburgh teams twice. It didn't much matter to the Blue Streaks players as the team ran through all of their opponents en route to an undefeated season. Led by senior co-captains Eddie Arsenault and Fred Rancourt, JCU averaged more than five and a half goals per game, never scoring fewer than three and allowed just over a goal a game during the regular season. The team's closest affair was after a long layoff against Carnegie Tech, a 3–2 win.

In the league playoffs, Duquesne fought well, scoring against the Blue Streaks as well as any team in the three-year history of the team, but it wasn't good enough. John Carrol swept both games and captured their third consecutive Penn-Ohio League championship. The only bad news for the season was the poor attendance for the team's games.

== Roster ==
No.	Nat.	Player	Class	Pos	Height	Weight	DoB	Hometown	Previous team
	(United States)	Edward J. Arsenault (C)	Senior	F				Waterford, Maine
		F. Eugene Davis	Junior
		Jack DeHaas	Sophomore	G
	(United States)	Daniel H. Hespen	Sophomore					Cleveland Heights, Ohio
		William A. Higgins	Junior	G/D
		Mike Hoynes	Sophomore	D
		Theodore J. Lempges	Senior	D
		John J. Manofsky	Senior	F
		Donald J. Myers	Junior	F
		John P. Murray	Senior	F
		George Otto	Senior
	(United States)	Wilfred Rancourt (C)	Senior	F/D				Maine
		Clem Rannigan	Junior	F
	(United States)	Mathias G. Schneider	Sophomore					Shaker Heights, Ohio
	(United States)	Robert L. Smith	Sophomore	G				New Rochelle, New York

== Standings ==
1939–40 Penn-Ohio Intercollegiate Hockey League standings
	Conference							Overall					
	GP	W	L	T	PTS	GF	GA	GP	W	L	T	GF	GA
John Carroll †*	13	13	0	0	26	72	16	15	15	0	0	82	23
Duquesne	12	9	2	1	19	44	28	18	9	8	1	58	64
Western Reserve	–	–	–	–	–	–	–	–	–	–	–	–	–
Case	–	–	–	–	–	–	–	–	–	–	–	–	–
Carnegie Tech	–	–	–	–	–	–	–	12	4	8	0	–	–
Fenn	–	–	–	–	–	–	–	–	–	–	–	–	–
† indicates conference regular season champion * indicates conference tournament champion

== Schedule and results ==
Date	Opponent	Site	Result	Record
Regular season
December 8	vs. Fenn	Cleveland Arena • Cleveland, Ohio	W 3–1	1–0–0 (1–0–0)
December 19	vs. Case	Cleveland Arena • Cleveland, Ohio	W 5–2	2–0–0 (2–0–0)
January 2	Carnegie Tech	Cleveland Arena • Cleveland, Ohio	W 3–0	3–0–0 (3–0–0)
January 5	vs. Western Reserve	Cleveland Arena • Cleveland, Ohio	W 6–2	4–0–0 (4–0–0)
January 19	vs. Fenn	Cleveland Arena • Cleveland, Ohio	W 8–0	5–0–0 (5–0–0)
January 31 ^{†}	Duquesne	Cleveland Arena • Cleveland, Ohio	W 3–0	6–0–0 (6–0–0)
February ?	vs. Case	Cleveland Arena • Cleveland, Ohio	W 7–0	7–0–0 (7–0–0)
February 6	at Duquesne	Duquesne Gardens • Pittsburgh, Pennsylvania	W 7–2	8–0–0 (8–0–0)
February 9	vs. Western Reserve	Cleveland Arena • Cleveland, Ohio	W 8–1	9–0–0 (9–0–0)
February 16	vs. Fenn	Cleveland Arena • Cleveland, Ohio	W 10–1	10–0–0 (10–0–0)
March 12	at Carnegie Tech	Duquesne Gardens • Pittsburgh, Pennsylvania	W 3–2	11–0–0 (11–0–0)
March 13	vs. Case	Cleveland Arena • Cleveland, Ohio	W 4–1	12–0–0 (12–0–0)
March 15	vs. Western Reserve	Cleveland Arena • Cleveland, Ohio	W 5–3	13–0–0 (13–0–0)
Penn-Ohio League Playoffs
March 20	Duquesne*	Cleveland Arena • Cleveland, Ohio (Championship Game 1)	W 4–2	14–0–0
March 29	at Duquesne*	Duquesne Gardens • Pittsburgh, Pennsylvania (Championship Game 2)	W 6–5 ^{OT}	15–0–0
John Carroll Won Series 2–0
*Non-conference game.

† Duquesne records have the game being played on February 1 with the score 3–1 for John Carroll.
