= 1939–40 Duquesne Dukes men's ice hockey season =

- Conference: Penn-Ohio League
- Home ice: Duquesne Gardens

Record
- Overall: 9–8–1
- Conference: 9–2–1
- Home: 2–2–0
- Road: 2–5–1
- Neutral: 5–1–0

Coaches and captains
- Head coach: Louis A. Dietrich
- Captain(s): Walter McGill; Bill Vance

The 1939–40 Duquesne Dukes men's ice hockey season was the 3rd season of play for the program.

== Season ==
Before the season even began, Duquesne got unwelcome news when their biggest rival and the only team to defeat them all of last year, Pittsburgh, terminated their hockey program. While their withdrawal would make it easier for the Dukes as far as winning games, the still-young program had bigger concerns. The Loss of Pitt meant that the team would have to travel to Cleveland more often, increasing the cost of running the team, and it would likely damper interest in the sport from locals. On top of those problems, what did it say about the league when one of the best teams for the first two seasons (Pitt had made the conference final both years) just quit before the season was to begin? In spite of the troubles, the remaining 6 teams and the rink operators decided to continue with the league and set down the schedule in early December.

The Dukes got off to a good start, winning their first five games and sitting atop league standings with John Carroll. The program went on its first non-conference road trip in mid-January, playing three non-conference team in a swing through upstate New York. While it wasn't a surprise to lose to Clarkson, getting embarrassed by the tune of 10–0 was not what the Dukes were hoping for. To make matters worse, they team lost the other two games by sizable margins and made it look like the team had been living in a too-comfortable bubble with the Penn-Ohio League. Despite the losses, Duquesne did achieve its main goal by introducing itself to other programs and hoped that they would be able to schedule further games in the future.

Duquesne sat out the rest of the semester for examinations and came back at the beginning of February. The team met John Carroll for a home-and-home series with league bragging right on the line. The powerhouse Blue Streaks took both games to make it nearly impossible for Duquesne to repeat as regular season champions, but the Dukes could still make the playoffs as long as they took care of business. The Dukes recovered from their losing streak with three consecutive wins and guaranteed themselves a second-place finish despite having two games remaining.

In the playoff series against John Carroll, Duquesne played the undefeated Blue Streaks about as well as could be expected. They lost a close affair in the first game and then pushed JCU into overtime in the rematch. Unfortunately, Duquesne wasn't able to tie the series and fell 5–6.

The loss was the last for the program as both Duquesne and Carnegie Tech suspended their ice hockey teams after the year. The Penn-Ohio League would continue for one more season with 4 schools before dissolving in 1941.

Doug Wells served as team manager

== Roster ==
No.	Nat.	Player	Class	Pos	Height	Weight	DoB	Hometown	Previous team
2		John Liebgot		F
3		Bill Vance (C)	Senior	F
5		Harry Foster	Senior	F
14		Walter McGill (C)	Senior	F
		Fran Fogarty	Senior
		Jim Hansberry		F
		George McMillen		G
		Steve Olah	Junior	D
		Frank Rushman
	(United States)	Dick Scully	Junior	F				Pittsburgh, Pennsylvania
		Frank Sweeney	Sophomore	D
		Jim Unger	Junior	D

== Standings ==
1939–40 Penn-Ohio Intercollegiate Hockey League standings
	Conference							Overall					
	GP	W	L	T	PTS	GF	GA	GP	W	L	T	GF	GA
John Carroll †*	13	13	0	0	26	72	16	15	15	0	0	82	23
Duquesne	12	9	2	1	19	44	28	18	9	8	1	58	64
Western Reserve	–	–	–	–	–	–	–	–	–	–	–	–	–
Case	–	–	–	–	–	–	–	–	–	–	–	–	–
Carnegie Tech	–	–	–	–	–	–	–	12	4	8	0	–	–
Fenn	–	–	–	–	–	–	–	–	–	–	–	–	–
† indicates conference regular season champion * indicates conference tournament champion

== Schedule and results ==
Date	Opponent	Site	Result	Record
Regular Season
December 9	vs. Carnegie Tech	Duquesne Gardens • Pittsburgh, Pennsylvania	W 4–3	1–0–0 (1–0–0)
December 13	at Fenn	Cleveland Arena • Cleveland, Ohio	W 5–0	2–0–0 (2–0–0)
December 15	at Case	Cleveland Arena • Cleveland, Ohio	W 4–2 ^{OT}	3–0–0 (3–0–0)
December 20	Western Reserve	Duquesne Gardens • Pittsburgh, Pennsylvania	W 5–1	4–0–0 (4–0–0)
January 2	vs. Carnegie Tech	Duquesne Gardens • Pittsburgh, Pennsylvania	W 5–4	5–0–0 (5–0–0)
January 10	at Clarkson*	Ives Park • Potsdam, New York	L 0–10	5–1–0
January 12	at Hamilton*	Russell Sage Rink • Clinton, New York	L 1–5	5–2–0
January 13	at Army*	Smith Rink • West Point, New York	L 3–6	5–3–0
February 1	John Carroll	Duquesne Gardens • Pittsburgh, Pennsylvania	L 1–3	5–4–0 (5–1–0)
February 6	at John Carroll	Cleveland Arena • Cleveland, Ohio	L 2–7	5–5–0 (5–2–0)
February 13	vs. Carnegie Tech	Duquesne Gardens • Pittsburgh, Pennsylvania	W 4–1	6–5–0 (6–2–0)
February 19	Case	Duquesne Gardens • Pittsburgh, Pennsylvania	W 5–1	7–5–0 (7–2–0)
February 22	vs. Carnegie Tech	Duquesne Gardens • Pittsburgh, Pennsylvania	W 3–1	8–5–0 (8–2–0)
February 24	vs. Pittsburgh All-Stars*	Shaffer Ice Palace • Johnstown, Pennsylvania	L 3–5	8–6–0
March ?	at Western Reserve	Cleveland Arena • Cleveland, Ohio	T 4–4	8–6–1 (8–2–1)
March 16	vs. Carnegie Tech	Duquesne Gardens • Pittsburgh, Pennsylvania	W 2–1	9–6–1 (9–2–1)
Penn-Ohio League Playoffs
March 20	at John Carroll*	Cleveland Arena • Cleveland, Ohio (Championship Game 1)	L 2–4	9–7–1
March 29	John Carroll*	Duquesne Gardens • Pittsburgh, Pennsylvania (Championship Game 2)	L 5–6 ^{OT}	9–8–1
Duquesne Lost Series 0–2
*Non-conference game.
