= 1936–37 United States collegiate men's ice hockey season =

- Duration: December 1936– March 1937
- East Collegiate champion: Harvard
- West Collegiate champion: None

The 1936–37 United States collegiate men's ice hockey season was the 43rd season of collegiate ice hockey in the United States.

== Regular season ==
=== Standings ===
1936–37 Eastern Collegiate ice hockey standings
	Intercollegiate							Overall					
	GP	W	L	T	Pct.	GF	GA	GP	W	L	T	GF	GA
Army	–	–	–	–	–	–	–	10	5	5	0	27	22
Boston College	–	–	–	–	–	–	–	13	8	4	1	70	42
Boston University	14	8	6	0	.571	50	55	14	8	6	0	50	55
Bowdoin	–	–	–	–	–	–	–	7	1	6	0	–	–
Brown	–	–	–	–	–	–	–	10	6	4	0	–	–
Clarkson	–	–	–	–	–	–	–	9	6	3	0	50	26
Colgate	–	–	–	–	–	–	–	7	4	3	0	–	–
Cornell	2	1	1	0	.500	5	3	2	1	1	0	5	3
Dartmouth	–	–	–	–	–	–	–	25	12	13	0	114	117
Hamilton	–	–	–	–	–	–	–	7	1	6	0	–	–
Harvard	–	–	–	–	–	–	–	16	15	1	0	–	–
Lafayette	0	0	0	0	–	0	0	2	1	1	0	6	9
Massachusetts State	–	–	–	–	–	–	–	6	3	3	0	–	–
Middlebury	–	–	–	–	–	–	–	9	5	3	1	–	–
MIT	–	–	–	–	–	–	–	12	1	11	0	–	–
New Hampshire	–	–	–	–	–	–	–	8	3	5	0	21	34
Northeastern	–	–	–	–	–	–	–	10	6	3	1	–	–
Princeton	–	–	–	–	–	–	–	17	6	11	0	–	–
Rensselaer	–	–	–	–	–	–	–	1	0	1	0	–	–
Union	–	–	–	–	–	–	–	6	1	5	0	–	–
Williams	–	–	–	–	–	–	–	9	5	3	1	–	–
Yale	–	–	–	–	–	–	–	16	5	11	0	–	–

1936–37 Western Collegiate ice hockey standings
	Intercollegiate							Overall					
	GP	W	L	T	Pct.	GF	GA	GP	W	L	T	GF	GA
Alaska-Fairbanks	–	–	–	–	–	–	–	3	0	3	0	–	–
Gonzaga	–	–	–	–	–	–	–	–	–	–	–	–	–
Michigan	–	–	–	–	–	–	–	18	11	6	1	76	50
Michigan Tech	–	–	–	–	–	–	–	18	7	8	3	–	–
Minnesota	–	–	–	–	–	–	–	16	11	4	1	–	–

1936–37 Minnesota Intercollegiate Athletic Conference ice hockey standings
	Conference							Overall					
	GP	W	L	T	PTS	GF	GA	GP	W	L	T	GF	GA
Macalester †	–	–	–	–	–	–	–	–	–	–	–	–	–
Augsburg	–	–	–	–	–	–	–	–	–	–	–	–	–
Hamline	–	–	–	–	–	–	–	–	–	–	–	–	–
Gustavus Adolphus	–	–	–	–	–	–	–	5	0	5	0	–	–
Saint John's	–	–	–	–	–	–	–	6	1	5	0	–	–
St. Olaf	–	–	–	–	–	–	–	5	2	3	0	–	–
St. Thomas	–	–	–	–	–	–	–	14	9	5	0	–	–
† indicates conference champion

1936–37 Pacific Coast Conference ice hockey standings
	Conference							Overall					
	GP	W	L	T	PTS	GF	GA	GP	W	L	T	GF	GA
California	–	–	–	–	–	–	–	–	–	–	–	–	–
Loyola	–	–	–	–	–	–	–	–	–	–	–	–	–
UCLA	–	–	–	–	–	–	–	–	–	–	–	–	–
USC	–	–	–	–	–	–	–	–	–	–	–	–	–
Washington	–	–	–	–	–	–	–	–	–	–	–	–	–
* indicates conference champion

== Bibliography ==
- 1936–37 NCAA Standings
