= Skytop, Pennsylvania =

Unincorporated community in Pennsylvania, US

- Unincorporated community
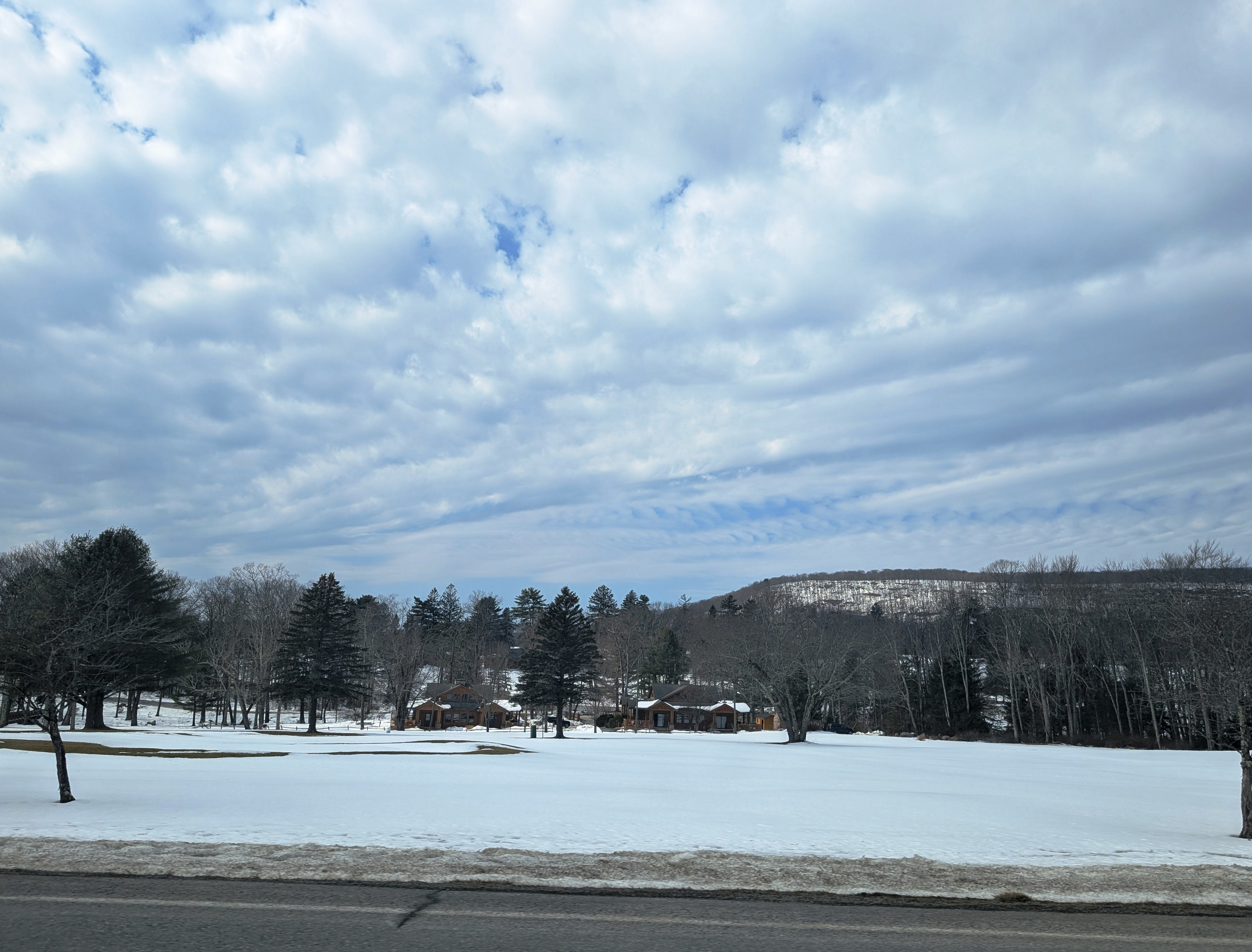
- Skytop Lodge grounds

- Location within Pennsylvania Location within the United States
- Coordinates: 41°13′40″N 75°14′18″W
- Country: United States
- State: Pennsylvania
- County: Monroe
- Township: Barrett
- Elevation: 1,572 ft (479 m)
- Time zone: UTC-5 (Eastern (EST))
  - Summer (DST): UTC-4 (EDT)
- ZIP code: 18357
- Area codes: 570 and 272
- GNIS feature ID: 1187770

Skytop is an unincorporated community in Barrett Township, Monroe County, Pennsylvania, United States. It is situated north of Mountainhome and can be accessed via local roads that connect to Route 390. Its elevation is 1,562 feet (476 m), and its geographical coordinates are 41°13′40″N 75°14′18″W (41.2278683, -75.2382360). Although Skytop is unincorporated, it does have a post office, with the ZIP code of 18357; the ZCTA for ZIP Code 18357 had a population of 87 at the 2000 census.

Additionally, Skytop is home to the Skytop Lodge, a historic retreat hotel that dates back to the 1920s.
