= Skytop Lodge =

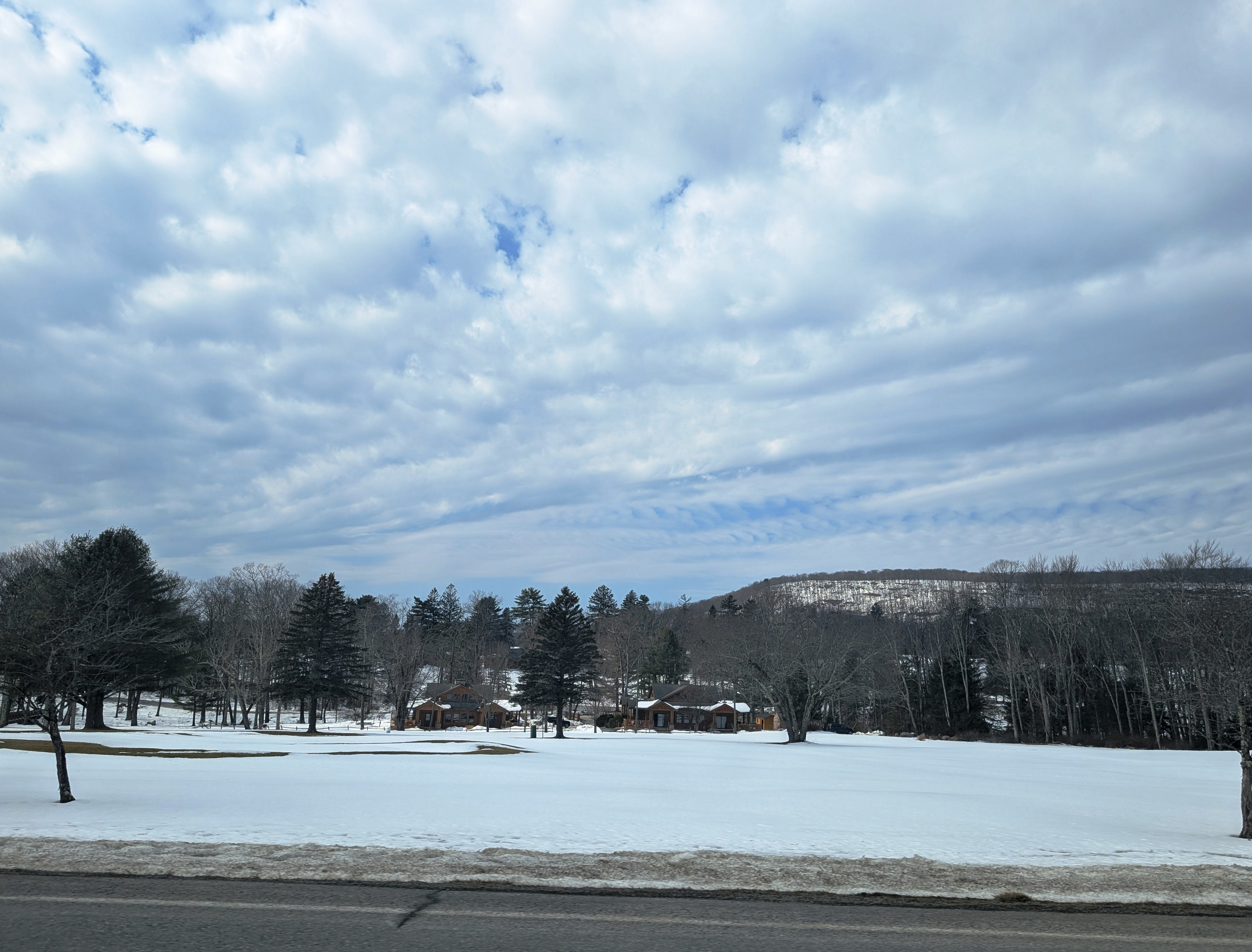
- Skytop Lodge and Mount Wismer as seen from PA 390

- Location within Pennsylvania Skytop Lodge (the United States)

General information
- Location: One Skytop Lodge Road, Skytop, Pennsylvania
- Coordinates: 41.228201°N 75.238239°W
- Completed: 1928

Skytop Lodge is a resort hotel that opened in June 1928. It is a member of Historic Hotels of America. The lodge is known for its Dutch Colonial Revival architecture, year-round outdoor recreation, including an 18 hole championship golf course, hiking trails, a 75-acre lake, and its role as a venue for weddings, conferences, and family vacations.

== History and notable features ==
This hotel is situated on a 5,500 acres (22 km^{2}) wooded site in Skytop, Pennsylvania, at an elevation of 1,500 feet in the Poconos. Centered around its historic main lodge the resort today offers a conference center, 75-acre lake, 30 miles of hiking trails, and an 18 hole golf course, making it a year-round destination. Built at a cost of $750,000, the Dutch Colonial Revival hotel was designed by Rossiter & Muller and Mortimer Foster of New York. The Olmsted Brothers of Boston were hired to situate the hotel and design its gardens and grounds.

The hotel has been described as "a Dutch Colonial-style field-stone castle in a country club setting," and as looming "like a palatial hunting chateau in a wide clearing in the woods – so grand you might think you were trespassing on the estate of an English lord." In addition to its architectural significance Skytop Lodge has become a noted venue for weddings, corporate retreats, and family vacations, contributing to the tourism economy of the Pocono Mountains.

Its golf course was begun in March 1926, and was opened in 1928 along with the hotel. Over the decades the course and lodge have hosted regional tournaments and special events.
