= 1939–40 United States collegiate men's ice hockey season =

- Duration: December 1939– March 1940
- East Collegiate champion: Yale
- West Collegiate champion: Minnesota

The 1939–40 United States collegiate men's ice hockey season was the 46th season of collegiate ice hockey in the United States.

== Regular season ==
=== Season tournaments ===
| Tournament | Dates | Teams | Champion |
|---|---|---|---|
| Lake Placid Invitational Tournament | January 1–3 | 8 | Colgate |

=== Standings ===
1939–40 Eastern Collegiate ice hockey standings
| | Intercollegiate | | | | | | | Overall | | | | | |
| | GP | W | L | T | Pct. | GF | GA | GP | W | L | T | GF | GA |
|---|---|---|---|---|---|---|---|---|---|---|---|---|---|
| Army | – | – | – | – | – | – | – | 10 | 6 | 2 | 2 | 35 | 37 |
| Boston College | – | – | – | – | – | – | – | 18 | 12 | 5 | 1 | 121 | 70 |
| Boston University | 11 | 4 | 4 | 3 | .500 | 45 | 44 | 12 | 4 | 5 | 3 | 50 | 50 |
| Bowdoin | – | – | – | – | – | – | – | 6 | 1 | 5 | 0 | – | – |
| Clarkson | – | – | – | – | – | – | – | 19 | 10 | 8 | 1 | 112 | 80 |
| Colgate | – | – | – | – | – | – | – | 13 | 9 | 4 | 0 | – | – |
| Cornell | 11 | 5 | 6 | 0 | .455 | 35 | 61 | 11 | 5 | 6 | 0 | 35 | 61 |
| Dartmouth | – | – | – | – | – | – | – | 18 | 9 | 7 | 2 | 80 | 80 |
| Hamilton | – | – | – | – | – | – | – | 13 | 9 | 4 | 0 | – | – |
| Harvard | – | – | – | – | – | – | – | 14 | 3 | 10 | 1 | – | – |
| Lafayette | 1 | 1 | 0 | 0 | 1.000 | 3 | 1 | 4 | 1 | 3 | 0 | 12 | 21 |
| Lehigh | 2 | 0 | 2 | 0 | .000 | 2 | 8 | 5 | 1 | 4 | 0 | 11 | 21 |
| Middlebury | – | – | – | – | – | – | – | 13 | 2 | 10 | 1 | – | – |
| MIT | – | – | – | – | – | – | – | 15 | 6 | 9 | 0 | – | – |
| New Hampshire | – | – | – | – | – | – | – | 10 | 1 | 9 | 0 | 22 | 51 |
| Northeastern | – | – | – | – | – | – | – | 11 | 7 | 4 | 0 | – | – |
| Norwich | – | – | – | – | – | – | – | 8 | 4 | 3 | 1 | – | – |
| Princeton | – | – | – | – | – | – | – | 19 | 9 | 7 | 3 | – | – |
| St. Lawrence | – | – | – | – | – | – | – | 9 | 1 | 8 | 0 | – | – |
| Syracuse | – | – | – | – | – | – | – | – | – | – | – | – | – |
| Union | – | – | – | – | – | – | – | 8 | 5 | 3 | 0 | – | – |
| Williams | – | – | – | – | – | – | – | 11 | 6 | 5 | 0 | – | – |
| Yale | – | – | – | – | – | – | – | 20 | 10 | 6 | 4 | – | – |

1939–40 Western Collegiate ice hockey standings
| | Intercollegiate | | | | | | | Overall | | | | | |
| | GP | W | L | T | Pct. | GF | GA | GP | W | L | T | GF | GA |
|---|---|---|---|---|---|---|---|---|---|---|---|---|---|
| Alaska-Fairbanks | – | – | – | – | – | – | – | 3 | 0 | 2 | 1 | – | – |
| Colorado College | 6 | 3 | 2 | 1 | .583 | 21 | 26 | 12 | 7 | 3 | 2 | 65 | 42 |
| Illinois | 12 | 1 | 11 | 0 | .083 | 17 | 61 | 14 | 3 | 11 | 0 | 31 | 61 |
| Michigan | 15 | 4 | 11 | 0 | .267 | 22 | 52 | 20 | 5 | 14 | 1 | 41 | 71 |
| Michigan Tech | 13 | 8 | 5 | 0 | .615 | 29 | 40 | 15 | 10 | 5 | 0 | 36 | 43 |
| Minnesota | 14 | 14 | 0 | 0 | 1.000 | 105 | 16 | 18 | 18 | 0 | 0 | 138 | 25 |

1939–40 Minnesota Intercollegiate Athletic Conference ice hockey standings
| | Conference | | | | | | | Overall | | | | | |
| | GP | W | L | T | PTS | GF | GA | GP | W | L | T | GF | GA |
|---|---|---|---|---|---|---|---|---|---|---|---|---|---|
| St. Thomas † | – | – | – | – | – | – | – | 8 | 5 | 1 | 2 | – | – |
| Augsburg | – | – | – | – | – | – | – | – | – | – | – | – | – |
| Hamline | – | – | – | – | – | – | – | – | – | – | – | – | – |
| Gustavus Adolphus | – | – | – | – | – | – | – | 14 | 9 | 2 | 3 | – | – |
| Macalester | – | – | – | – | – | – | – | – | – | – | – | – | – |
| Saint John's | – | – | – | – | – | – | – | 10 | 3 | 6 | 1 | – | – |
| St. Olaf | – | – | – | – | – | – | – | 10 | 5 | 5 | 0 | – | – |
† indicates conference champion

1939–40 Pacific Coast Conference ice hockey standings
| | Conference | | | | | | | Overall | | | | | |
| | GP | W | L | T | PTS | GF | GA | GP | W | L | T | GF | GA |
|---|---|---|---|---|---|---|---|---|---|---|---|---|---|
| California | – | – | – | – | – | – | – | – | – | – | – | – | – |
| Gonzaga | – | – | – | – | – | – | – | 10 | 6 | 3 | 1 | – | – |
| Loyola | – | – | – | – | – | – | – | – | – | – | – | – | – |
| UCLA | – | – | – | – | – | – | – | – | – | – | – | – | – |
| USC | – | – | – | – | – | – | – | – | – | – | – | – | – |
* indicates conference champion

1939–40 Penn-Ohio Intercollegiate Hockey League standings
| | Conference | | | | | | | Overall | | | | | |
| | GP | W | L | T | PTS | GF | GA | GP | W | L | T | GF | GA |
|---|---|---|---|---|---|---|---|---|---|---|---|---|---|
| John Carroll †* | 13 | 13 | 0 | 0 | 26 | 72 | 16 | 15 | 15 | 0 | 0 | 82 | 23 |
| Duquesne | 12 | 9 | 2 | 1 | 19 | 44 | 28 | 18 | 9 | 8 | 1 | 58 | 64 |
| Western Reserve | – | – | – | – | – | – | – | – | – | – | – | – | – |
| Case | – | – | – | – | – | – | – | – | – | – | – | – | – |
| Carnegie Tech | – | – | – | – | – | – | – | 12 | 4 | 8 | 0 | – | – |
| Fenn | – | – | – | – | – | – | – | – | – | – | – | – | – |
† indicates conference regular season champion * indicates conference tournament champion
