= Lafayette Leopards men's ice hockey =

- University: Lafayette College
- First season: 1936–37
- Arena: Easton, Pennsylvania
- Colors: Maroon and white

The Lafayette College Ice Hockey Club team is a college ice hockey program that represents Lafayette College. The team currently operates an unofficial club team but the university previously sponsored varsity ice hockey between 1936 and 1941.

== History ==
The first attempt at forming an ice hockey team at Lafayette came in the 1920s. While nothing materialized at the time, the students did eventually put together the first unofficial hockey club in 1935. Finding ice time was difficult without a local rink, however, there was enough interest from the student body that the school allowed a formal team to be formed two years later. Arranged and coached by then-Athletic Director Henry W. Clark, who was aided by Religious Studies professor Dale H. Moore, Lafayette played its first official game in February 1937. A few weeks later, the team won its first game by defeating nearby rival Lehigh.

After a second season, the school decided to discontinue its support for the team, which then continued in an unofficial capacity. A successful campaign from the student body restored the team's varsity status in 1939 and was followed by the club's entry into a small conference. While Lafayette now had a little more stability with its schedule, the biggest impediment for the club remained; it did not possess a home rink. A lack of attention from the student body caused the number of prospective players to sharply decline after the team's first winning season and the program was mothballed in 1942.

After World War II, the team was reformed, however, it only did so in an unofficial capacity. The club continued for a few years before disappearing altogether. In the succeeding years it has resurfaced but there have been no attempts to return it to varsity status.

== Season-by-season results ==
=== Varsity ===
NCAA D-I Champions	NCAA Frozen Four	Conference Regular Season Champions	Conference Playoff Champions

Season	Conference	Regular Season (Note: Code explanation; GP—Games Played, W—Wins, L—Losses, T—Tied games, Pts—Points)											Conference Tournament Results	National Tournament Results
Season	Conference	Conference						Overall					Conference Tournament Results	National Tournament Results
Season	Conference	GP	W	L	T	Pts*	Finish	GP	W	L	T	%	Conference Tournament Results	National Tournament Results
Henry W. Clark (1936–1941) / Dale H. Moore (1936–1939)
1936–37	Independent	–	–	–	–	–	–	2	1	1	0	.500		
1937–38	Independent	–	–	–	–	–	–	2	1	1	0	.500		
Program suspended
1939–40	Independent	–	–	–	–	–	–	4	1	3	0	.250		
1940–41	Independent	–	–	–	–	–	–	5	3	2	0	.600		
Program suspended
Totals								GP	W	L	T	%	Championships	
Regular Season								13	6	7	0	.462		
Conference Post-season								0	0	0	0	–		
NCAA Post-season								0	0	0	0	–		
Regular Season and Post-season Record								13	6	7	0	.462		
