= Albeth Ice Palace =

Outdoor ice rink in Allentown, Pennsylvania

- Former names: Albeth Ice Rink
- Location: Allentown, Pennsylvania
- Owner: City of Allentown

Construction
- Opened: 1939 (86–87 years ago)
- Closed: 2004 (21–22 years ago)

Tenants
- Lehigh ice hockey 1939–2003; Penguin Figure Skating Club 1941–2004

The Albeth Ice Palace (Allentown - Bethlehem) was an outdoor ice rink in the city of the Allentown, Pennsylvania. The rink primarily served as a recreational and public skating rink, however, it was also home to both the Lehigh Mountain Hawks and Penguin Figure Skating Club for over 60 years.

== History ==
Shortly after opening in 1939, the ice hockey team from Lehigh University in nearby Bethlehem was granted permission to use the facility as a home venue. The team would use the rink as its home for the next 64 years. Two years later, the Penguin Figure Skating Club was formed used the rink to showcase regional athletes. The rink remained in active use for 65 years and served as a hub for ice skating activities in the area.

By the beginning of the 21st century, the rink was showing its age and a much more modern rink was built in Bethlehem in 2003. The following year, with most events having been transferred to the Steel Ice Center, the Albeth Ice Palace held one final public skate in April before closing for good.
