= Gerry Cosby =

American ice hockey player and businessman

Medal record

Men's ice hockey

Representing United States

World Championships
Gold medal – first place	1933 Prague	

Finton Gerard David Cosby (May 15, 1909 – November 26, 1996) was an American ice hockey player and businessman. Cosby played goaltender for the Massachusetts Rangers, the team that won the 1933 World Ice Hockey Championships, representing the United States of America. His outstanding performance (allowing one goal in five games) helped lead the United States to its first gold medal at the World Ice Hockey Championships.

In the late 1930s, he played for the New York Rovers of the Eastern League. He later served as a practice goaltender for the New York Rangers, New York Americans and Boston Bruins of the National Hockey League. In 1935 he was voted most valuable player while tending goal for the Wembley Lions in England. In 1936 he was invited to join the United States Olympic team but he was unable to accept. He also represented his country at the 1938 World Ice Hockey Championships in Prague, Czechoslovakia, where the Americans finished in seventh place.

In 1938, he founded the successful sporting goods and athletic equipment company, Gerry Cosby & Co., along with his brother John, which had its headquarters at Madison Square Garden in New York. The company supplies hockey equipment to amateur and professional teams throughout North America.

He was inducted into the International Ice Hockey Federation Hall of Fame in 1997, and was named to the IIHF All-Time USA Team in 2020.
