= John Garrison (ice hockey) =

American ice hockey player (1909–1988)

Medal record

Men's ice hockey

Representing United States

Olympic Games
Silver medal – second place	1932 Lake Placid	Team
Bronze medal – third place	1936 Garmisch-Partenkirchen	Team

World Championships
Gold medal – first place	1933 Prague	

John Bright Garrison (February 13, 1909 – May 13, 1988) was an American ice hockey player.

He was born in West Newton, Massachusetts and died in Lincoln, Massachusetts. Garrison grew up playing on the varsity team of the County Day School in West Newton, Massachusetts before entering Harvard University. He received many offers from professional clubs after graduation from Harvard but chose a career in business instead while continuing to play amateur hockey.

In 1932 he was a member of the American ice hockey team, which won the silver medal. He played all six matches and scored three goals.

Four years later he won the bronze medal with the American team in the 1936 Olympics. He played seven matches and scored four goals.

He was also a member of the Massachusetts Rangers, the American team that won the 1933 World Ice Hockey Championships. Garrison scored the dramatic overtime goal in a 2-1 victory over the Canadian national team, thus ensuring the gold medal.

He was inducted into the United States Hockey Hall of Fame in 1973.
