= Henry W. Clark =

American football player and coach (1899–1976)

Biographical details
- Born: April 11, 1899; Wrangell, Alaska, U.S.
- Died: March 23, 1976 (aged 76); Silver Spring, Maryland, U.S.

Playing career

Football
- 1918: Stanford
- 1921–1922: Harvard
- Position: Center

Coaching career (HC unless noted)

Football
- 1923: Harvard (freshmen line)
- 1925: Trinity (CT)
- 1926–1927: Harvard (assistant)
- 1932: US Olympic Team (advisory coach)

Ice hockey
- 1936–1941: Lafayette

Administrative career (AD unless noted)
- 1928–1935: Harvard (assistant AD)
- 1935–1944: Lafayette

Head coaching record
- Overall: 1–5

Henry Wadsworth "Eskie" Clark ( April 11, 1899 – March 23, 1976) was an American college football player and coach, athletics administrator, and shipping executive. He served as the head football coach at Trinity College in Hartford, Connecticut for one season, in 1925, compiling a record of 1–5. Clark was the athletic director at Lafayette College in Easton, Pennsylvania from 1935 to 1944.

Clark was born in Wrangell, Alaska. After attending Phillips Exeter Academy, he played football as a center and was a shot putter on the track and field team at Harvard University, from which he graduated in 1923. Clark was later vice president of the Alaska Steamship Company and worked in labor relations on the West Coast of the United States. He also wrote two books on the history of Alaska. Clark died on March 23, 1976, in Silver Spring, Maryland.

== Head coaching record ==
Year	Team	Overall	Conference	Standing	Bowl/playoffs
Trinity Bantams (Independent) (1925)
1925	Trinity	1–5			
Trinity:		1–5			
Total:		1–5			
