= 1921–22 Hamilton Continentals men's ice hockey season =

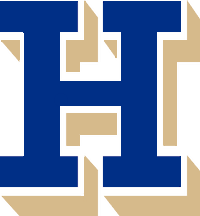
- Conference: Independent
- Home ice: Russell Sage Rink

Record
- Overall: 7–2–0

Coaches and captains
- Head coach: Albert Prettyman
- Captain: Dick Reeder

The 1921–22 Hamilton Continentals men's ice hockey season was the 4th season of play for the program. The Continentals represented Hamilton College and were coached by Albert Prettyman in his 4th season.

== Season ==
For the team's first season at the Russell Sage Rink, most of the Continentals' games were scheduled as home contests. This was done not only to advantage the team but also as a practical matter. Since many games that were set for outdoor rinks had been cancelled in recent years, usually due to adverse weather conditions, matches that were held in enclosed building were much less likely to be scrapped.

Hamilton began the season against Amherst but was still getting used to their new rink. The Continentals fell down early but managed to claw their way back and earn a close victory. A week later, the club suffered its first loss in almost two years when Army put up an unusually strong defensive effort. Hamilton then returned home for a match with Massachusetts Agricultural that was marred by improper officiating. The referee was unfamiliar with some of the updated rules and was calling infractions that had not been in effect since the war. As a result, several penalties were handed out for infractions that no longer existed. Luckily for Hamilton, most of those went against the Aggies, however, it meant that the Continentals' close victory was not earned.

The team was hoping that February would bring them better fortune as the season was not progressing as coach Prettyman would have liked. Their first game after the exams was with Columbia and saw captain Dick Reeder play his best game of the season. Time and again he turned aside shots from the Lions and prevented them from scoring until the very end of the game. Marlow and Yates combined to stake the team to a 2-goal lead in the first but, as the game wore on, Hamilton began to tire and Columbia was able to use multiple reserve players to gain an edge. The visitors finally broke through in the third but time expired before they could secure a second marker. After continuing to improve their play in a win over Penn, Hamilton finally looked like its championship self again in a demolition of Colgate. Watson Thompson scored one goal per period while the rest of the team followed suit with five more. Several penalties were handed out in the physical match but it didn't appear to affect the final result as the Continentals bullied the visitors all night long.

The team only seemed to get better as the season progressed. In their next game the Continentals clobbered an outmatched Clarkson squad, 12–2. The Knights were completely unable to stem the tide of the Blue and Buff attack and allowed Watson Thompson to tie a collegiate record with 8 goals in the match. Hamilton was supposed to take a trip to Ithaca to face Cornell a few days later. Unfortunately, the game was cancelled due a lack of ice. Instead, Hamilton's succeeding match came a week later and the team got an even bigger win, albeit against possibly the worst collegiate team that season. Rensselaer was hopelessly outclassed to the tune of 12–0 with the Thompson brothers combining for 10 goals on the evening.

For the final game of the season, Hamilton hosted the Nichols Hockey Club of Buffalo. The team's defense was challenged more than it had been all season and they were taken to task by the amateur outfit. The offense remained strong, scoring 6 goals in the game but Dick Reeder faltered in goal and surrendered 9 to the visitors.

Clinton C. Bennett served as team manager with H. Louis George as his assistant.

== Roster ==
No.	Nat.	Player	Class	Pos	Height	Weight	DoB	Hometown	Previous team
	(United States)	L. Danforth Bates	Sophomore	D/RW				Jamaica, New York
	(United States)	Frank W. Marlow	Junior	D			1902-01-23	Syracuse, New York
	(United States)	Burton S. Price	Junior	D				New Rochelle, New York
	(United States)	R. J. Richardson Reeder (C)	Senior	G			1899-05-15	Carthage, New York
	(United States)	Roscoe G. Reeder	Senior	D			1900-11-02	Carthage, New York
		A. Russell Thompson	Freshman	LW/RW
	(United States)	Watson M. Thompson	Junior	C				Jamaica, New York
	(United States)	Harry D. Yates	Freshman	LW/RW			1903-07-21	Buffalo, New York

== Standings ==
1921–22 Eastern Collegiate ice hockey standings
	Intercollegiate							Overall					
	GP	W	L	T	Pct.	GF	GA	GP	W	L	T	GF	GA
Amherst	10	4	6	0	.400	14	15	10	4	6	0	14	15
Army	7	4	2	1	.643	23	11	9	5	3	1	26	15
Bates	7	3	4	0	.429	17	16	13	8	5	0	44	25
Boston College	3	3	0	0	1.000	16	3	8	4	3	1	23	16
Bowdoin	3	0	2	1	.167	2	4	9	2	6	1	12	18
Clarkson	1	0	1	0	.000	2	12	2	0	2	0	9	20
Colby	4	1	2	1	.375	5	13	7	3	3	1	16	25
Colgate	3	0	3	0	.000	3	14	4	0	4	0	7	24
Columbia	7	3	3	1	.500	21	24	7	3	3	1	21	24
Cornell	5	4	1	0	.800	17	10	5	4	1	0	17	10
Dartmouth	6	4	1	1	.750	10	5	6	4	1	1	10	5
Hamilton	8	7	1	0	.875	45	13	9	7	2	0	51	22
Harvard	6	6	0	0	1.000	33	5	11	8	1	2	51	17
Massachusetts Agricultural	9	5	4	0	.556	16	23	11	6	5	0	20	30
MIT	6	3	3	0	.500	14	18	10	4	6	0	–	–
Pennsylvania	7	2	5	0	.286	16	28	8	3	5	0	23	29
Princeton	7	2	5	0	.286	12	21	10	3	6	1	21	28
Rensselaer	5	0	5	0	.000	2	28	5	0	5	0	2	28
Union	0	0	0	0	–	0	0	6	2	4	0	12	12
Williams	8	3	4	1	.438	27	19	8	3	4	1	27	19
Yale	14	7	7	0	.500	46	39	19	9	10	0	55	54
YMCA College	6	2	4	0	.333	3	21	6	2	4	0	3	21

== Schedule and results ==
Date	Opponent	Site	Result	Record
Regular Season
January 13	Amherst*	Russell Sage Rink • Clinton, New York	W 2–1	1–0–0
January 21	at Army*	Stuart Rink • West Point, New York	L 0–3	1–1–0
January 28	Massachusetts Agricultural*	Russell Sage Rink • Clinton, New York	W 5–3	2–1–0
February 6	Columbia*	Russell Sage Rink • Clinton, New York	W 2–1	3–1–0
February 10	Pennsylvania*	Russell Sage Rink • Clinton, New York	W 4–2	4–1–0
February 15	Colgate*	Russell Sage Rink • Clinton, New York	W 8–1	5–1–0
February 18	Clarkson*	Russell Sage Rink • Clinton, New York	W 12–2	6–1–0
February 25	Rensselaer*	Russell Sage Rink • Clinton, New York	W 12–0	7–1–0
March 4	Nichols Hockey Club*	Russell Sage Rink • Clinton, New York	L 6–9	7–2–0
*Non-conference game.
