= 1921–22 Colgate men's ice hockey season =

- Conference: Independent
- Home ice: Taylor Lake

Record
- Overall: 0–4–0
- Road: 0–4–0

Coaches and captains
- Head coach: James Ballantine
- Captain: George Gormley

The 1920–21 Colgate men's ice hockey season was the 4th season of play for the program. The team was coached by James Ballantine in his 2nd season.

== Season ==
As the season began, Colgate had the benefit of not needing to replace any last year's players as all lettermen were still at school. Several newcomers did try out for the team but, with no void to fill, the Maroons could afford to be deliberate in their selection process. Three rinks were planned for the school; two on Taylor Lake and a third east of the willow path. A small slate of 6 or 7 games was arranged for the team with only one game per week until the very end of the season.

Despite getting some decent ice time ahead of their opening match with Army, Colgate was slow out of the gate and allowed the Cadets to build a 3-goal lead after just one period. The Maroon defense stiffened afterwards but the offense could never get anything going. Team captain Gormley made several spectacular saves to prevent the score from getting out of hand but the forwards were unable to give him any assistance. The team performed better in the second game against Cornell and Sanford got his team on the board first with a goal just a few minutes into the match. The Big Red steadily scored three goals to take a 2-goal lead but Sanford responded with his second to put his team within one. Unfortunately, the Cornell netminder was not accommodating and Colgate was unable to complete the comeback.

After being delayed until early February, the team travelled up to Buffalo to take on the Nichols Hockey Club, an amateur outfit. On the best ice they had seen all year, the team was able produce their best offensive output with 4 goals. However, the defense was not ready for the speed of the game and surrendered 10 goals to the home team. Due to the cancellation of other matches, the final game of the year was at Hamilton and the Maroons had the misfortune of playing one of the top teams in college hockey. Colgate was seemingly on the defensive for the entire game and could hardly resist the overpowering attack from the Continentals. Sanford scored the only goal for the Maroons but that did nothing to overcome the 8 markers that fond their way behind Gormley.

Though the team lost all of their games, worse news was to come when the school decided against continuing the program. The Maroons would not play another official game for over 5 years.

Warner Chadwick served as team manager.

Note: Colgate's athletic teams did not have a moniker until 'Red Raiders' was adopted in 1932.

== Roster ==
No.	Nat.	Player	Class	Pos	Height	Weight	DoB	Hometown	Previous team
	(United States)	William S. Childs	Junior	C/LW				Bernardsville, New Jersey
	(United States)	George C. Gormley (C)	Senior	G				Cleveland, Ohio
	(United States)	Robert P. Gygli	Senior	D/RW			1900-01-13	Cleveland, Ohio
	(United States)	Maurice E. Levy	Sophomore	D			1902-04-26	Pittsfield, Massachusetts
	(United States)	Ralph W. Pearsall	Junior	D			1901-06-02	Sea Cliff, New York
	(United States)	Russell H. Sackett	Senior	D			1897-12-28	Gouverneur, New York
	(United States)	Chester W. Sanford	Sophomore	C/LW				Medford, Massachusetts
	(United States)	Edward L. Townsend	Junior	D/RW				Flushing, New York

== Standings ==
1921–22 Eastern Collegiate ice hockey standings
	Intercollegiate							Overall					
	GP	W	L	T	Pct.	GF	GA	GP	W	L	T	GF	GA
Amherst	10	4	6	0	.400	14	15	10	4	6	0	14	15
Army	7	4	2	1	.643	23	11	9	5	3	1	26	15
Bates	7	3	4	0	.429	17	16	13	8	5	0	44	25
Boston College	3	3	0	0	1.000	16	3	8	4	3	1	23	16
Bowdoin	3	0	2	1	.167	2	4	9	2	6	1	12	18
Clarkson	1	0	1	0	.000	2	12	2	0	2	0	9	20
Colby	4	1	2	1	.375	5	13	7	3	3	1	16	25
Colgate	3	0	3	0	.000	3	14	4	0	4	0	7	24
Columbia	7	3	3	1	.500	21	24	7	3	3	1	21	24
Cornell	5	4	1	0	.800	17	10	5	4	1	0	17	10
Dartmouth	6	4	1	1	.750	10	5	6	4	1	1	10	5
Hamilton	8	7	1	0	.875	45	13	9	7	2	0	51	22
Harvard	6	6	0	0	1.000	33	5	11	8	1	2	51	17
Massachusetts Agricultural	9	5	4	0	.556	16	23	11	6	5	0	20	30
MIT	6	3	3	0	.500	14	18	10	4	6	0	–	–
Pennsylvania	7	2	5	0	.286	16	28	8	3	5	0	23	29
Princeton	7	2	5	0	.286	12	21	10	3	6	1	21	28
Rensselaer	5	0	5	0	.000	2	28	5	0	5	0	2	28
Union	0	0	0	0	–	0	0	6	2	4	0	12	12
Williams	8	3	4	1	.438	27	19	8	3	4	1	27	19
Yale	14	7	7	0	.500	46	39	19	9	10	0	55	54
YMCA College	6	2	4	0	.333	3	21	6	2	4	0	3	21

== Schedule and results ==
Date	Opponent	Site	Result	Record
Regular Season
January 14	at Army*	Stuart Rink • West Point, New York	L 0–3	0–1–0
January 21	at Cornell*	Beebe Lake • Ithaca, New York	L 2–3	0–2–0
February 6	at Nichols Hockey Club*	Broadway Auditorium • Buffalo, New York	L 4–10	0–3–0
February 15	at Hamilton*	Russell Sage Rink • Clinton, New York	L 1–8	0–4–0
*Non-conference game.
