= 1921–22 Clarkson Golden Knights men's ice hockey season =

Intercollegiate hockey season

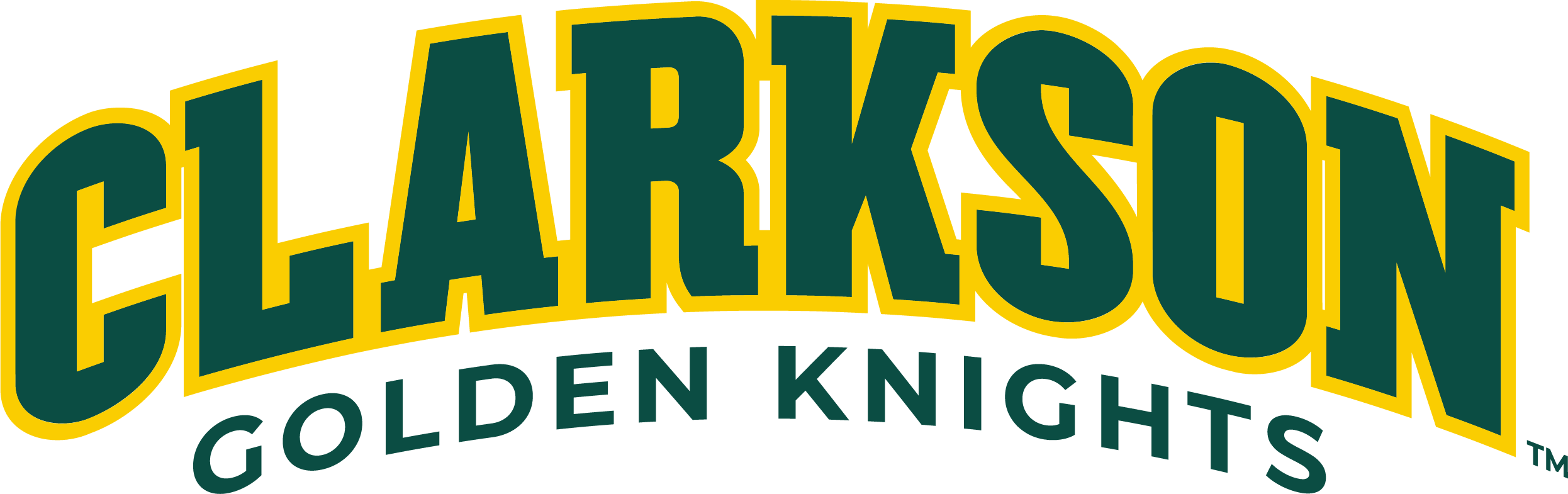
- Home ice: Ives Park

Record
- Overall: 0–2–0
- Road: 0–2–0

Coaches and captains
- Captain: Bill Johnson

The 1921–22 Clarkson Golden Knights men's ice hockey season was the 2nd season of play for the program.

== Season ==
Clarkson's second season was nearly a repeat of its first with a few important differences. On the negative side, the Golden Knights would end up finishing with a losing record. The positives, however, would end up being much more important. While the team was unable to expand on their three-game schedule, the number of players doubled. If nothing else, this indicated that the team had a better chance to survive after the initial lineup graduated. A further indication that the team was becoming popular was its inclusion on the school's newspaper. While only a monthly circular at the time, the Clarkson Integrator published the results of the games for the first time in 1922.

The first game for the team was the third meeting with Alexandria Bay. As the previous two had been, it was a close, high-scoring game. However, Clarkson ended up on the losing side for the first time. Despite roaring out to a 5–0 lead in the first, the Golden Knights didn't have the defensive acumen to hold the lead and fell 7–8. captain Bill Johnson was the star of the game with 5 goals to his credit. The Knights had to wait nearly a month for their next game and the time off did not serve the team well. Clarkson was whipped by Hamilton 2–12. The second game was marked by a change in style by the team's defenders shifting from point positions (one in front of the other) to the newer side-by-side arrangement.

Clarkson lists a third game being played that season, a win over an amateur club from Massena. However, according to contemporary reports, three other games, including the one against Massena, were apparently cancelled due to a lack of available ice.

== Roster ==
No.	Nat.	Player	Class	Pos	Height	Weight	DoB	Hometown	Previous team
		Richard Conboy	Junior	G
		Dillion	Junior	D
	(United States)	Cyril Fenn	Sophomore	F				New York, New York
		William Franse		G
		Franklin Hart		D
		Bill Johnson (C)	Junior	F
	(United States)	Samuel LaFontaine	Freshman	F				Champlain, New York
		Leland Stevens	Junior	D
		Henry Wilson		D
		Maurice Wood	Freshman	F

== Standings ==
1921–22 Eastern Collegiate ice hockey standings
	Intercollegiate							Overall					
	GP	W	L	T	Pct.	GF	GA	GP	W	L	T	GF	GA
Amherst	10	4	6	0	.400	14	15	10	4	6	0	14	15
Army	7	4	2	1	.643	23	11	9	5	3	1	26	15
Bates	7	3	4	0	.429	17	16	13	8	5	0	44	25
Boston College	3	3	0	0	1.000	16	3	8	4	3	1	23	16
Bowdoin	3	0	2	1	.167	2	4	9	2	6	1	12	18
Clarkson	1	0	1	0	.000	2	12	2	0	2	0	9	20
Colby	4	1	2	1	.375	5	13	7	3	3	1	16	25
Colgate	3	0	3	0	.000	3	14	4	0	4	0	7	24
Columbia	7	3	3	1	.500	21	24	7	3	3	1	21	24
Cornell	5	4	1	0	.800	17	10	5	4	1	0	17	10
Dartmouth	6	4	1	1	.750	10	5	6	4	1	1	10	5
Hamilton	8	7	1	0	.875	45	13	9	7	2	0	51	22
Harvard	6	6	0	0	1.000	33	5	11	8	1	2	51	17
Massachusetts Agricultural	9	5	4	0	.556	16	23	11	6	5	0	20	30
MIT	6	3	3	0	.500	14	18	10	4	6	0	–	–
Pennsylvania	7	2	5	0	.286	16	28	8	3	5	0	23	29
Princeton	7	2	5	0	.286	12	21	10	3	6	1	21	28
Rensselaer	5	0	5	0	.000	2	28	5	0	5	0	2	28
Union	0	0	0	0	–	0	0	6	2	4	0	12	12
Williams	8	3	4	1	.438	27	19	8	3	4	1	27	19
Yale	14	7	7	0	.500	46	39	19	9	10	0	55	54
YMCA College	6	2	4	0	.333	3	21	6	2	4	0	3	21

== Schedule and results ==
Date	Opponent	Site	Result	Record
Regular season
January 21	at Alexandria Bay*	Alexandria Bay, New York	L 7–8	0–1–0
February 18	at Hamilton*	Russell Sage Rink • Clinton, New York	L 2–12	0–2–0
*Non-conference game.

== Scoring statistics ==
Name	Position	Games	Goals
Bill Johnson	C	2	5
Dillion	CP/D	2	2
Franklin Hart	P/D	2	1
Samuel LaFontaine	RW	2	1
Richard Conboy	G	1	0
Cyril Fenn	LW	1	0
William Franse	G	1	0
Leland Stevens	P	1	0
Henry Wilson	D	1	0
Maurice Wood	RW/LW	2	0
Total			9

Note: Assists were not recorded as a statistic.

== Goaltending statistics ==
Name	Games	Minutes	Wins	Losses	Ties	Goals against	Shut outs	GAA
William Franse	1	60	0	1	0	8	0	8.00
