= 1921–22 Penn Quakers men's ice hockey season =

- Home ice: Philadelphia Ice Palace

Record
- Overall: 3–5–0
- Home: 1–2–0
- Road: 1–3–0
- Neutral: 1–0–0

Coaches and captains
- Head coach: George Orton; Frank Winters
- Captain: G. Murray

The 1921–22 Penn Quakers men's ice hockey season was the 10th season of play for the program.

== Season ==
Looking to improve on the modest success the team found last year, the program first had to search for a new head coach. The team attempted to hire George Schmael, as he would also be able to handle the lacrosse team as well, but George Orton remained in charge for the first part of the season. As the team was forming, two transfers stood out for the Quakers: Pinney, formerly of Minnesota, and Blank, from Army both showed talent in goal and gave the Quakers a bit of hope before their opening game against Yale.

Penn won their for game of the season but, perhaps more importantly, they had defeated Yale for the first time in Program history. The team would have to wait until after Christmas to play their second game and there was hope that the team was on the ascent. Princeton dampened those hopes with a 4–0 victory. Despite playing well, the Quakers were unable to stop the Tiger's star center, Van Gerbig. To make matters worse, Penn lost their center, Wanamaker, to a deep cut on the leg that would heal, but not enough before their rematch with Yale. Even with Yale missing their own star player, the Bulldogs avenged their earlier loss with a 8–3 dissection of the Quakers.

Wanamaker remained sidelined in the team's next game but the match with Columbia saw Penn overcome an early deficit and match the Lions goal-for-goal until they triumphed with an overtime win. After a second loss to Princeton, the team paused for a few weeks for exams. When they returned, they did so with a new head coach. Frank Winters had been the coach of the Cleveland Athletic Club for four years and but wouldn't be able to take over until after the two games on the weekend of the 10th.

The team headed to upstate New York for their next two games, first facing Hamilton. The team performed well but fell to the strong Continentals squad. The next day they got a chance to redeem themselves against Cornell. Even with Wanamaker back in the lineup, Penn ended Orton's tenure as coach on a low note. Despite the slide, the arrival of Winters for the next game against Lafayette reignited the embers of hope and the team responded with a rousing triumph. Wanamaker scored five times in their 7–1 win and team got ready for a quick turnaround.

Unfortunately, all of the team's remaining games were eventually cancelled. Two games in early March had been previous postponed due to scheduling conflicts and the game on the 25th against Army was called off at the last minute. After the season, Frank Winters decided that travelling from Cleveland to Philadelphia was an untenable proposition and would not return as head coach. He was behind the bench for just a single game in the end.

== Roster ==
No.	Nat.	Player	Class	Pos	Height	Weight	DoB	Hometown	Previous team
		Blank		G
		Diall		RW
		Fortier		F
		Richard Kearns Jr.		D
		G. Murray (C)		D
		O'Reilly		LW/RW
		Pinney		G
		Andrew C. Pringle	Junior	C/LW
		C. Smith		D
	(United States)	Percy Wanamaker	Junior	C/RW				Melrose, Massachusetts

== Standings ==
1921–22 Eastern Collegiate ice hockey standings
	Intercollegiate							Overall					
	GP	W	L	T	Pct.	GF	GA	GP	W	L	T	GF	GA
Amherst	10	4	6	0	.400	14	15	10	4	6	0	14	15
Army	7	4	2	1	.643	23	11	9	5	3	1	26	15
Bates	7	3	4	0	.429	17	16	13	8	5	0	44	25
Boston College	3	3	0	0	1.000	16	3	8	4	3	1	23	16
Bowdoin	3	0	2	1	.167	2	4	9	2	6	1	12	18
Clarkson	1	0	1	0	.000	2	12	2	0	2	0	9	20
Colby	4	1	2	1	.375	5	13	7	3	3	1	16	25
Colgate	3	0	3	0	.000	3	14	4	0	4	0	7	24
Columbia	7	3	3	1	.500	21	24	7	3	3	1	21	24
Cornell	5	4	1	0	.800	17	10	5	4	1	0	17	10
Dartmouth	6	4	1	1	.750	10	5	6	4	1	1	10	5
Hamilton	8	7	1	0	.875	45	13	9	7	2	0	51	22
Harvard	6	6	0	0	1.000	33	5	11	8	1	2	51	17
Massachusetts Agricultural	9	5	4	0	.556	16	23	11	6	5	0	20	30
MIT	6	3	3	0	.500	14	18	10	4	6	0	–	–
Pennsylvania	7	2	5	0	.286	16	28	8	3	5	0	23	29
Princeton	7	2	5	0	.286	12	21	10	3	6	1	21	28
Rensselaer	5	0	5	0	.000	2	28	5	0	5	0	2	28
Union	0	0	0	0	–	0	0	6	2	4	0	12	12
Williams	8	3	4	1	.438	27	19	8	3	4	1	27	19
Yale	14	7	7	0	.500	46	39	19	9	10	0	55	54
YMCA College	6	2	4	0	.333	3	21	6	2	4	0	3	21

== Schedule and results ==
Date	Opponent	Site	Result	Record
Regular Season
December 17	Yale*	Philadelphia Ice Palace • Philadelphia, Pennsylvania	W 4–2	1–0–0
January 6	Princeton*	Philadelphia Ice Palace • Philadelphia, Pennsylvania	L 0–4	1–1–0
January 11	at Yale*	New Haven Arena • New Haven, Connecticut	L 3–8	1–2–0
January 20	at Columbia*	181st Street Ice Palace • Manhattan, New York	W 5–4 ^{OT}	2–2–0
January 27	Princeton*	Philadelphia Ice Palace • Philadelphia, Pennsylvania	L 0–2	2–3–0
February 10	at Hamilton*	Russell Sage Rink • Clinton, New York	L 2–4	2–4–0
February 11	at Cornell*	Beebe Lake • Ithaca, New York	L 2–4	2–5–0
February 21	vs. Lafayette ^{†}*	Philadelphia Ice Palace • Philadelphia, Pennsylvania	W 7–1	3–5–0
*Non-conference game.

† Lafayette was an unofficial club team.
