= 1921–22 Amherst Lord Jeffs men's ice hockey season =

- Conference: Independent
- Home ice: Pratt Field

Record
- Overall: 4–6–0
- Home: 4–2–0
- Road: 0–4–0

Coaches and captains
- Head coach: Leon Plumer
- Captain: John Worcester

The 1921–22 Amherst Lord Jeffs men's ice hockey season was the 9th season of play for the program. The Lord Jeffs were coached by Leon Plumer in his first season.

== Season ==
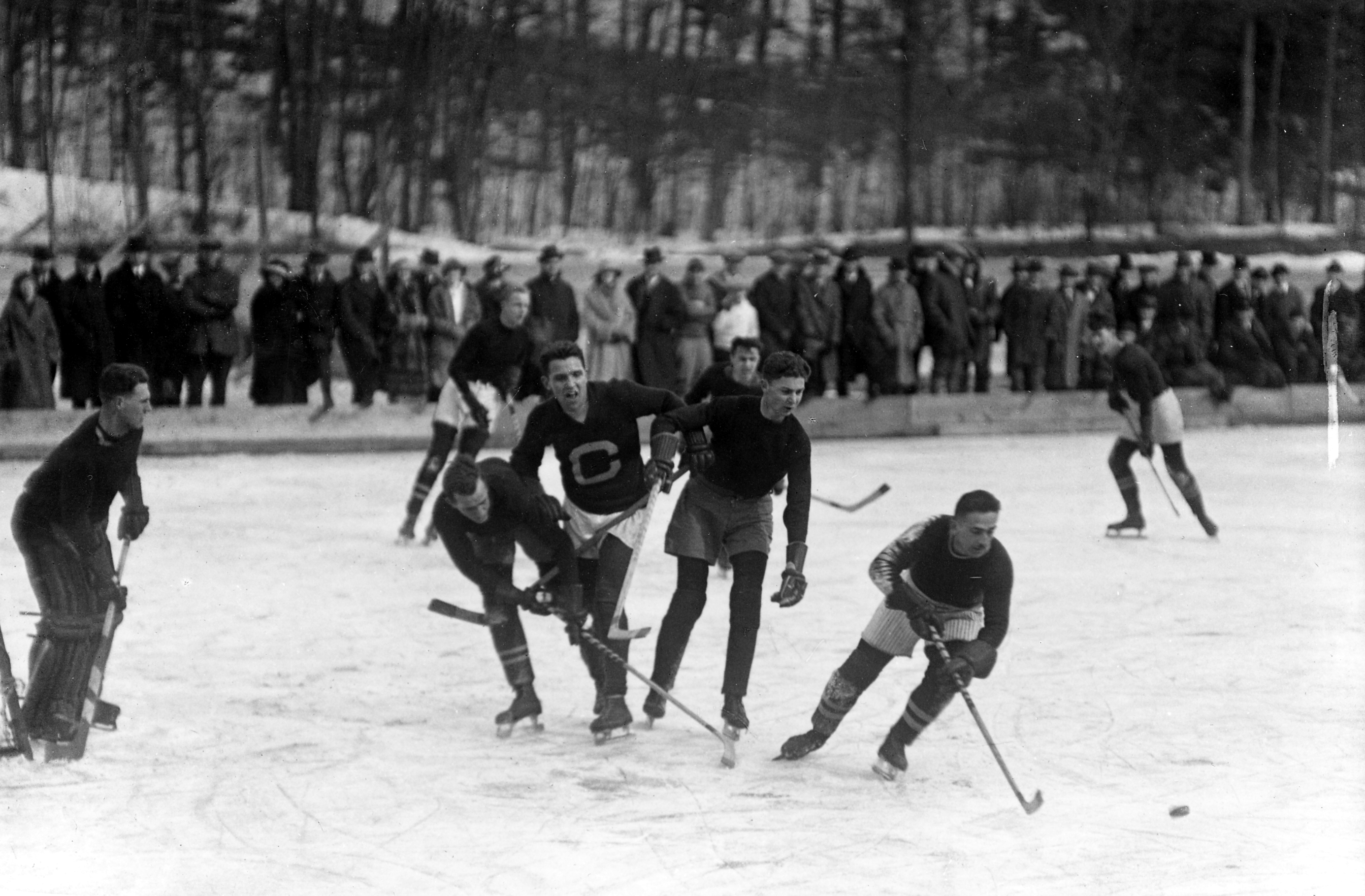
Cornell vs. Amherst, Jan 14

With a new moniker for the college's team (unofficial as it may be), Amherst wasted no time in preparing for the season. Seeking to banish the memory of a winless season, the team used an uncommon tactic of employing an undergrad as the team's coach. To make things interesting, Leon Plumer was not a member of the team, though he had been two years earlier. Plumer ran the Jeffs through drills whenever possible on the temporary rink but there was little chance to prepare for the inaugural match right after they returned from the winter break. Among other things, Amherst officially adopted the new 6-on-6 format and abandoned the rover position.

In the first match, Dartmouth was once again one of the best teams in the country and the purple did well just by keeping the score close. A week later the team took a jaunt through upstate New York and came away with two more defeats. The match with Hamilton showed some improvement with the team, however, the second game was a bit of a clunker and the Jeff lost 0–4.

At the time the weather was being kind and allowed the ice on Pratt Field to solidify into a fast sheet. The team got as much practice in as they could ahead of the next game and everything seemed to come together when they hosted YMCA College. Worcester was moved to center for the game which helped spur the best game for Amherst since the war. The Purple trounced the Maroons 5–0 and ended their 10-game losing streak in the process. A week later the team was widely outplayed by Massachusetts Agricultural, however, Plimpton was the star of the game and stopped 50 shots in 42 minutes of action. Unfortunately, their goaltender's heroics went for naught as the Jeffmen were beaten, 0–1.

Amherst's home stand concluded with a pair of wins over Bates and YMCA and set up a two-game series with Williams. The Ephs welcomed Amherst with one of the longest games in program history, playing three 20-minute periods rather than the then-customary 15-minute frames. The extra time didn't help the Lord Jeffs as Amherst was unable to score in the game, though Plimpton did post another remarkable effort in the loss. The rematch saw the Purple offense show its teeth and two goals from captain Worcester led Amherst to the win.

The final game of the season was a rematch with the Mass. Aggies and was quite similar to the first. Plimpton played less than in the first match with the Mass Aggies, but still performed excellently. Amherst's offense was unable to get a single puck into the MAC cage. The final score was 0-1, resulting in the Purples losing 0–1. Despite the loss, this was the best season performance for the team in over a decade.

During the season, Russell F. Neale served as team manager with William F. Whitla as his assistant.

== Roster ==
No.	Nat.	Player	Class	Pos	Height	Weight	DoB	Hometown	Previous team
	(United States)	Crosby Allison	Freshman	D				Brooklyn, New York
	(United States)	Allen Davidson	Senior	C/RW			1901-08-04	Auburndale, Massachusetts
	(United States)	Frank H. Hunter	Sophomore	LW/RW			1901-10-22	Wexford, Pennsylvania
	(United States)	Joseph R. Kingman Jr.	Sophomore	LW			1900-06-08	Minneapolis, Minnesota
	(United States)	Donald Lawson	Freshman	D/LW				Brooklyn, New York
	(United States)	Francis T. P. Plimpton	Senior	G			1900-12-07	Manhattan, New York
	(United States)	Albert L. Sylvester Jr.	Sophomore	D/LW			1903-05-06	Norwell, Massachusetts
	(United States)	George L. Titus	Sophomore	LW			1903-01-30	Brooklyn, New York
	(United States)	John N. Worcester (C)	Senior	D/C			1899-12-18	Cambridge, Massachusetts

== Standings ==
1921–22 Eastern Collegiate ice hockey standings
	Intercollegiate							Overall					
	GP	W	L	T	Pct.	GF	GA	GP	W	L	T	GF	GA
Amherst	10	4	6	0	.400	14	15	10	4	6	0	14	15
Army	7	4	2	1	.643	23	11	9	5	3	1	26	15
Bates	7	3	4	0	.429	17	16	13	8	5	0	44	25
Boston College	3	3	0	0	1.000	16	3	8	4	3	1	23	16
Bowdoin	3	0	2	1	.167	2	4	9	2	6	1	12	18
Clarkson	1	0	1	0	.000	2	12	2	0	2	0	9	20
Colby	4	1	2	1	.375	5	13	7	3	3	1	16	25
Colgate	3	0	3	0	.000	3	14	4	0	4	0	7	24
Columbia	7	3	3	1	.500	21	24	7	3	3	1	21	24
Cornell	5	4	1	0	.800	17	10	5	4	1	0	17	10
Dartmouth	6	4	1	1	.750	10	5	6	4	1	1	10	5
Hamilton	8	7	1	0	.875	45	13	9	7	2	0	51	22
Harvard	6	6	0	0	1.000	33	5	11	8	1	2	51	17
Massachusetts Agricultural	9	5	4	0	.556	16	23	11	6	5	0	20	30
MIT	6	3	3	0	.500	14	18	10	4	6	0	–	–
Pennsylvania	7	2	5	0	.286	16	28	8	3	5	0	23	29
Princeton	7	2	5	0	.286	12	21	10	3	6	1	21	28
Rensselaer	5	0	5	0	.000	2	28	5	0	5	0	2	28
Union	0	0	0	0	–	0	0	6	2	4	0	12	12
Williams	8	3	4	1	.438	27	19	8	3	4	1	27	19
Yale	14	7	7	0	.500	46	39	19	9	10	0	55	54
YMCA College	6	2	4	0	.333	3	21	6	2	4	0	3	21

== Schedule and results ==
Date	Opponent	Site	Result	Record
Regular Season
January 7	at Dartmouth*	Occom Pond • Hanover, New Hampshire	L 0–2	0–1–0
January 13	at Hamilton*	Russell Sage Rink • Clinton, New York	L 1–2	0–2–0
January 14	at Cornell*	Beebe Lake • Ithaca, New York	L 0–4	0–3–0
January 18	at YMCA College*	Pratt Field Rink • Springfield, Massachusetts	W 5–0	1–3–0
January 24	Massachusetts Agricultural*	Pratt Field Rink • Amherst, Massachusetts	L 0–1	1–4–0
January 27	Bates*	Pratt Field Rink • Amherst, Massachusetts	W 3–1	2–4–0
February 4	YMCA College*	Pratt Field Rink • Amherst, Massachusetts	W 2–0	3–4–0
February 9	at Williams*	Cole Field House Rink • Williamstown, Massachusetts	L 0–2	3–5–0
February 14	Williams*	Pratt Field Rink • Amherst, Massachusetts	W 3–2	4–5–0
February 16	Massachusetts Agricultural*	Pratt Field Rink • Amherst, Massachusetts	L 0–1	4–6–0
*Non-conference game.
