= 1921–22 RPI Engineers men's ice hockey season =

Sports season

- Conference: Independent

Record
- Overall: 0–5–0
- Home: 0–1–0
- Road: 0–4–0

Coaches and captains
- Head coach: Leroy Clark
- Captain: William Tierney

The 1921–22 RPI Engineers men's ice hockey season was the 19th season of play for the program. The team was coached by Leroy Clark in his 5th season.

== Season ==
Rensselaer began its season with a road game at Williams. While both teams had to contend with rough ice, the Ephs played as a team while the Engineers acted as if they were by themselves. The contrast in styles led to an easy win for the home team as RPI was unable to handle the attack from the Purple squad. Captain Tierney was the only one to score the Rensselaer in the otherwise terrible game.

The second match a few weeks later provided RPI with its best opportunity for a win. Unfortunately, a total lack of offense prevented the Engineers from earning a win. In their only home game of the year, Rensselaer played a fast game against YMCA College. The team's minimal attack was stopped by a sturdy defensive effort from the Maroons and the single goal from the visitors was all they needed. RPI had an extended break until their next game due to the exam break but the team didn't appear any better when they met YMCA for a rematch. The offense remained silent in the match and, though the still only allowed one goal, the Engineers lost once more.

Afterwards, the team headed south to play Columbia. While the Lions had the advantage of experience with avoiding the pillars that were set into the surface of their home rink, the disparity in play was even more stark as Columbia easily won the game. Tierney was again the only player on the scoresheet for Rensselaer. The team played its final game of the year the following week and they were completely outclassed by Hamilton. Playing at the brand new Russell Sage Rink, Hamilton lit the lamp 12 times while Rensselaer was unable to get any offense going. The loss finished off possibly the worst season in program history.

== Roster ==
No.	Nat.	Player	Class	Pos	Height	Weight	DoB	Hometown	Previous team
		Armstrong		D
		Breithaupt		D
		Dureau		LW/RW
		Ewing		LW
		Ferrey		RW
		MacKenzie MacIntyre		D
		Quinn		F
		Robbins		G
		William Tierney (C)		C/RW

== Standings ==
1921–22 Eastern Collegiate ice hockey standings
	Intercollegiate							Overall					
	GP	W	L	T	Pct.	GF	GA	GP	W	L	T	GF	GA
Amherst	10	4	6	0	.400	14	15	10	4	6	0	14	15
Army	7	4	2	1	.643	23	11	9	5	3	1	26	15
Bates	7	3	4	0	.429	17	16	13	8	5	0	44	25
Boston College	3	3	0	0	1.000	16	3	8	4	3	1	23	16
Bowdoin	3	0	2	1	.167	2	4	9	2	6	1	12	18
Clarkson	1	0	1	0	.000	2	12	2	0	2	0	9	20
Colby	4	1	2	1	.375	5	13	7	3	3	1	16	25
Colgate	3	0	3	0	.000	3	14	4	0	4	0	7	24
Columbia	7	3	3	1	.500	21	24	7	3	3	1	21	24
Cornell	5	4	1	0	.800	17	10	5	4	1	0	17	10
Dartmouth	6	4	1	1	.750	10	5	6	4	1	1	10	5
Hamilton	8	7	1	0	.875	45	13	9	7	2	0	51	22
Harvard	6	6	0	0	1.000	33	5	11	8	1	2	51	17
Massachusetts Agricultural	9	5	4	0	.556	16	23	11	6	5	0	20	30
MIT	6	3	3	0	.500	14	18	10	4	6	0	–	–
Pennsylvania	7	2	5	0	.286	16	28	8	3	5	0	23	29
Princeton	7	2	5	0	.286	12	21	10	3	6	1	21	28
Rensselaer	5	0	5	0	.000	2	28	5	0	5	0	2	28
Union	0	0	0	0	–	0	0	6	2	4	0	12	12
Williams	8	3	4	1	.438	27	19	8	3	4	1	27	19
Yale	14	7	7	0	.500	46	39	19	9	10	0	55	54
YMCA College	6	2	4	0	.333	3	21	6	2	4	0	3	21

== Schedule and results ==
Date	Opponent	Site	Result	Record
Regular Season
January 7	at Williams*	Cole Field Rink • Williamstown, Massachusetts	L 1–9	0–1–0
January 21	YMCA College*	RPI Rink • Troy, New York	L 0–1	0–2–0
February 11	at YMCA College*	Pratt Field Rink • Springfield, Massachusetts	L 0–1	0–3–0
February 18	at Columbia*	181st Street Ice Palace • Manhattan, New York	L 1–5	0–4–0
February 25	at Hamilton*	Russell Sage Rink • Clinton, New York	L 0–12	0–5–0
*Non-conference game.
