= 1921–22 Columbia Lions men's ice hockey season =

- Home ice: 181st Street Ice Palace

Record
- Overall: 3–3–1
- Home: 3–0–0
- Road: 0–3–1

Coaches and captains
- Head coach: Tom Howard
- Assistant coaches: Rufus Trimble
- Captain: Ewen C. Anderson

The 1921–22 Columbia men's ice hockey season was the 21st season of play for the program.

== Season ==
Columbia opened their season with the first game ever played at Yale's new home building. The game was, unfortunately, a disaster for the Lions who were wholly unable to stop the Bulldog attack in a 10–2 loss. The next two contests, against Colgate and Princeton were both cancelled due to warm weather causing a lack of available ice, not an uncommon problem at the time. The extra practice served Columbia well as their next official game ended as a 4–3 overtime win over Princeton.

After a close loss to Penn, the team took two weeks off to study for mid-term exams before returning in early February against Hamilton. After dropping the match Columbia headed to Hanover to play Dartmouth at their winter carnival but a snowstorm caused the game to be called part-way through the second period. Columbia finished their season with two convincing home wins (a further game against Army was cancelled) leaving the team with its first non-losing season in a decade. Unfortunately, the team struggled to sell tickets for those games, an ill omen for the future of the program.

Douglas MacKay served as manager of the team until taking a job with the Winnipeg Tribune. After his departure W. A. Southall took over duties on a temporary basis.

== Roster ==
No.	Nat.	Player	Class	Pos	Height	Weight	DoB	Hometown	Previous team
		Ewen C. Anderson (C)	Senior	D					Montclair High School
		Marshall W. Baldwin	Sophomore	C/RW
		Church		F/D
		Frank Hanson	Freshman	RW
		Jennings		G
		William C. Kopper	Sophomore	G
		Park		D
		Mackey Rackow	Sophomore	D
		David B. Rogers	Junior	C/RW					Acadia
		Walter Rollins	Junior	LW
		Warren M. Squires	Senior	D
		Wilson	Freshman	RW					Loyola Prep

== Standings ==
1921–22 Eastern Collegiate ice hockey standings
	Intercollegiate							Overall					
	GP	W	L	T	Pct.	GF	GA	GP	W	L	T	GF	GA
Amherst	10	4	6	0	.400	14	15	10	4	6	0	14	15
Army	7	4	2	1	.643	23	11	9	5	3	1	26	15
Bates	7	3	4	0	.429	17	16	13	8	5	0	44	25
Boston College	3	3	0	0	1.000	16	3	8	4	3	1	23	16
Bowdoin	3	0	2	1	.167	2	4	9	2	6	1	12	18
Clarkson	1	0	1	0	.000	2	12	2	0	2	0	9	20
Colby	4	1	2	1	.375	5	13	7	3	3	1	16	25
Colgate	3	0	3	0	.000	3	14	4	0	4	0	7	24
Columbia	7	3	3	1	.500	21	24	7	3	3	1	21	24
Cornell	5	4	1	0	.800	17	10	5	4	1	0	17	10
Dartmouth	6	4	1	1	.750	10	5	6	4	1	1	10	5
Hamilton	8	7	1	0	.875	45	13	9	7	2	0	51	22
Harvard	6	6	0	0	1.000	33	5	11	8	1	2	51	17
Massachusetts Agricultural	9	5	4	0	.556	16	23	11	6	5	0	20	30
MIT	6	3	3	0	.500	14	18	10	4	6	0	–	–
Pennsylvania	7	2	5	0	.286	16	28	8	3	5	0	23	29
Princeton	7	2	5	0	.286	12	21	10	3	6	1	21	28
Rensselaer	5	0	5	0	.000	2	28	5	0	5	0	2	28
Union	0	0	0	0	–	0	0	6	2	4	0	12	12
Williams	8	3	4	1	.438	27	19	8	3	4	1	27	19
Yale	14	7	7	0	.500	46	39	19	9	10	0	55	54
YMCA College	6	2	4	0	.333	3	21	6	2	4	0	3	21

== Schedule and results ==
Date	Opponent	Site	Result	Record
Regular Season
December 14	at Yale*	New Haven Arena • New Haven, Connecticut	L 2–10	0–1–0
January 9	St. Paul's School*	181st Street Ice Palace • New York, New York (Exhibition)	W 7–3	
January 18	Princeton*	181st Street Ice Palace • New York, New York	W 4–3 ^{OT}	1–1–0
January 20	at Pennsylvania*	Philadelphia Arena • Philadelphia, Pennsylvania	L 4–5 ^{OT}	1–2–0
February 6	at Hamilton*	Russell Sage Rink • Clinton, New York	L 1–2	1–3–0
February 11	at Dartmouth*	Hanover, New Hampshire	T 0–0	1–3–1
February 18	Rensselaer*	181st Street Ice Palace • New York, New York	W 5–1	2–3–1
March 4	Williams*	181st Street Ice Palace • New York, New York	W 5–3	3–3–1
*Non-conference game.

== Scoring Statistics ==
Name	Position	Games	Goals
Ewen Anderson	D	7	9
David Rogers	C/RW	7	7
Walter Rollins	LW	7	4
Church	D/F	6	1
Frank Hanson	RW	1	0
Park	D	1	0
Wilson	RW	1	0
Harry Kopper	G	1	0
Marshall Baldwin	C/RW	3	0
Mackay Rakckow	D	6	0
Warren Squires	D/RW	7	0
Jennings	G	7	0
Total			21

Note: Assists were not recorded as a statistic.
