= 1921–22 Union Skating Dutchmen ice hockey season =

- Conference: Independent
- Home ice: Central Park Rink

Record
- Overall: 2–4–0
- Road: 1–0–0
- Neutral: 1–4–0

Coaches and captains
- Head coach: Ambrose Clark
- Captain: Rod Davis

The 1921–22 Union Skating Dutchmen men's ice hockey season was the 9th season of play for the program. The Skating Dutchmen represented Union College and were coached by Ambrose Clark in his 2nd season.

== Season ==
After suspending the program last year, the school's athletic board approved the return of the ice hockey program as a minor sport in mid-January. The late start meant that it would be nearly impossible for the team to schedule any games against intercollegiate opponents. However, in order to help the team get onto the ice, Union agreed to participate in the city's hockey league. Unfortunately, the weather didn't help conditions at the open-air Central Park Rink and the team's first game with Schenectady High School had to be cancelled.

The scant number of player who tried out for the team got as much practice in as they could on the poor ice and finally got to play their first match in mid-February. On the Mohawk Golf Club's Rink, Union played a decent game against the high schoolers, however, their lineup had a fatal flaw. Abrahamson, the team's netminder, had never played goal previously and was only used because there were no other options. He tried his best but Abrahamson allowed four goals on long shots, one more than the Dutchmen were able to score. Team captain Rod Davis called out for more students to try out for the team and the Dutchmen saw their chances buoyed by the addition of Jimmie La Pan and Don Dold.

The two new arrivals couldn't have come at a better time as the team was preparing to play four games in as many days. While the first match with Palumet was postponed, the second saw the team record its first win of the year when they downed the local golf club. Dold and defense continued to play strong in the succeeding two games, however, the offense dried up and the Garnet were shutout in back-to-back matches. The next week the team was supposed to play a doubleheader but both matched were delayed due to poor ice conditions. A hasty rearrangement of the schedule set Union against the Palumet Athletic Club and the Dutchmen played their fastest game of the season. David was moved up to right wing and helped Union's scoring return. The team notched 4 goals while Dold blanked the amateurs to give Union its second win of the season.

The final game of the year was a rematch with the High School and Union was eager to finish the year with a win. Clark replaced Dolan on the wing but that didn't stop the Dutchmen from being able to score. Union played a solid game but the high schoolers wouldn't go away. The teenagers overcame a Union lead in the third to force overtime and the Dutchmen couldn't answer their opponent's marker in the extra session.

Dick Meyer served as team manager.

== Roster ==
No.	Nat.	Player	Class	Pos	Height	Weight	DoB	Hometown	Previous team
		Abrahamson		G
		Boyles		D
		Clark		LW
		Rod Davis (C)		D
		John V. Dolan		LW
		Donald T. Dold		G
		George Drohan		C
		James La Pan		F
		William F. La Pan		RW
		Riley		D
		Hugh J. Slattery		D

== Standings ==
1921–22 Eastern Collegiate ice hockey standings
	Intercollegiate							Overall					
	GP	W	L	T	Pct.	GF	GA	GP	W	L	T	GF	GA
Amherst	10	4	6	0	.400	14	15	10	4	6	0	14	15
Army	7	4	2	1	.643	23	11	9	5	3	1	26	15
Bates	7	3	4	0	.429	17	16	13	8	5	0	44	25
Boston College	3	3	0	0	1.000	16	3	8	4	3	1	23	16
Bowdoin	3	0	2	1	.167	2	4	9	2	6	1	12	18
Clarkson	1	0	1	0	.000	2	12	2	0	2	0	9	20
Colby	4	1	2	1	.375	5	13	7	3	3	1	16	25
Colgate	3	0	3	0	.000	3	14	4	0	4	0	7	24
Columbia	7	3	3	1	.500	21	24	7	3	3	1	21	24
Cornell	5	4	1	0	.800	17	10	5	4	1	0	17	10
Dartmouth	6	4	1	1	.750	10	5	6	4	1	1	10	5
Hamilton	8	7	1	0	.875	45	13	9	7	2	0	51	22
Harvard	6	6	0	0	1.000	33	5	11	8	1	2	51	17
Massachusetts Agricultural	9	5	4	0	.556	16	23	11	6	5	0	20	30
MIT	6	3	3	0	.500	14	18	10	4	6	0	–	–
Pennsylvania	7	2	5	0	.286	16	28	8	3	5	0	23	29
Princeton	7	2	5	0	.286	12	21	10	3	6	1	21	28
Rensselaer	5	0	5	0	.000	2	28	5	0	5	0	2	28
Union	0	0	0	0	–	0	0	6	2	4	0	12	12
Williams	8	3	4	1	.438	27	19	8	3	4	1	27	19
Yale	14	7	7	0	.500	46	39	19	9	10	0	55	54
YMCA College	6	2	4	0	.333	3	21	6	2	4	0	3	21

== Schedule and results ==
Date	Opponent	Site	Result	Record
Regular Season
February 10	vs. Schenectady High School*	Mohawk Club Rink • Schenectady, New York	L 3–4	0–1–0
February 18	at Mohawk Golf Club*	Mohawk Club Rink • Schenectady, New York	W 2–1	1–1–0
February 19	vs. Schenectady Boat Club*	Mohawk Club Rink • Schenectady, New York	L 0–2	1–2–0
February 20	vs. Fuller Athletic Club*	Mohawk Club Rink • Schenectady, New York	L 0–1	1–3–0
February 25	vs. Palumet Athletic Club*	Central Park Rink • Schenectady, New York	W 4–0	2–3–0
February 26	vs. Schenectady High School*	Central Park Rink • Schenectady, New York	L 3–4 ^{OT}	2–4–0
*Non-conference game.
