= 1921–22 Bowdoin Polar Bears men's ice hockey season =

- Conference: Independent
- Home ice: Delta Rink

Record
- Overall: 2–6–1
- Home: 2–3–0
- Road: 0–3–1

Coaches and captains
- Head coach: Allen Morrell
- Captain: Alonzo Holmes

The 1921–22 Bowdoin Polar Bears men's ice hockey season was the 3rd season of play for the program.

== Season ==
Bowdoin began its third season with the promotion of last year's team captain, Allen Morrell, to the position of coach. Morrell was still enrolled at Bowdoin and still a member of the team but, after their poor results the year before, the club decided they needed to have someone in charge. Fellow senior Alonzo Holmes took over as captain and the team, searching for a better year, put together a 12-game schedule in early December. Unfortunately, the team began the year with a loss to their usual foe, Bates. Poor conditions had prevented the team from getting much practice in ahead of time and the game was played on rough ice that hampered both teams. The match was played with two 20-minute halves with the first using 7-man units while the teams dispensed with the rover in the second. Miguel was the star for the team, allowing just one goal to the Garnet, but the offense didn't give him any support and were shutout.

The team's first home game was due to be played on the 11th against St. Dominique but that game was postponed due to poor ice conditions. Instead, the Polar Bears scrambled to get an opponent for the weekend and managed to get the Portland Country Club to appear. Though they were able to play a game, the ice was still in sad shape and the teams were slow as a result. Miguel was credited with a good performance in goal despite allowing 4 goals on 26 shots but, again, the offense was unable to muster much in the way of scoring chances. The weather cooled down enough afterwards for the Whites to squeeze a home-and-home series with St. Dominique and split the matches. The Bears offense showed the first signs of life with a 2-goal output on the 16th, scoring both in the third period. Needham opened the next game with his second marker of the season just 9 seconds into the match. Unfortunately, that was the only offense the Bears could offer and St. Dominique methodically took over the game to have Bwdoin its third loss of the year.

The team took a few weeks off afterwards for the exam break but their return game with Bates ended up being cancelled due to a snowstorm. Instead, the Polar Bears met St. Dominique on February 9 and played probably their best game of the season. While Holmes was off the team after graduating, the team was buoyed by the return of Al Morrell, who had been absent since the first match, and the addition of Vic Whitman, who had played the year before. After the team found itself down by a pair in the second period, Morrell scored twice to tie the game then completed his hat-trick in the third. The Bears' lead was short-lived, however, and St. Dominique was able to force overtime. Just before the end of the 5-minute extra period, the winning goal was shot past Miguel and Bowdoin was down in the season series. The club didn't have long to lick its wounds and was back on the ice two days later. The lineup was reshuffled with Morrell dropping back to defense and, while that helped in their own end, it caused the offense to stall once more. Whitman snagged the only goal for the Bears who, despite a valiant effort, fell to Colby 1–2. The game was notable for being the first time that Bowdoin played with the defensemen playing side-by-side rather than single file.

Drastically needing a spark, Miguel and Nichols swapped positions for the final game with St. Dominique. Nichols proved capable in goal, saving several scoring chances. The offense, however, was silent, getting just 3 shots on goal. Miguel and Nichols reverted to their normal position in the next game while Plaisted and Tracey joined the forward contingent. Their arrival coincided with the best offensive performance for the team as they notched their second win of the year. Because the rematch with Bates couldn't be rescheduled, Bowdoin ended its season with a trip to Waterville. Because the ice was soft, nether team could get much offense generated and the match ended in a draw.

After the season, the cost of the program was tabulated and found to have cost the university $453.58. The majority of money spent was for equipment, some $200, while travel ($82) and accommodations for visiting teams ($67) were the other costly debits. The program had received $225 from the school and made $142 on gate receipts from home games. Other credits amounted to a total of $487.91 in funds, meaning that, at the end of the year, the team was able to return approximately $34 to the school treasurer.

Richard Small served as team manager.

== Roster ==
No.	Nat.	Player	Class	Pos	Height	Weight	DoB	Hometown	Previous team
	(United States)	John W. Cronin	Freshman	C/LW			1905-02-10	Lewiston, Maine
	(United States)	Charles L. Godfrey	Freshman	D			1900-11-27	Somerville, Massachusetts
	(United States)	Alonzo B. Holmes (C)	Senior	C			1896-09-30	Avon, Maine
	(United States)	Arthur J. D. Miguel	Sophomore	G/F			1901-08-29	Cambridge, Massachusetts
	(United States)	Allen E. Morrell	Senior	D/RW			1897-07-07	Hyde Park, Massachusetts
	(United States)	Allen K. Needham	Freshman	LW			1902-10-13	Manchester, Massachusetts
	(United States)	Barrett C. Nichols	Freshman	G/D/F			1901-12-14	Boston, Massachusetts
	(United States)	Frank H. Plaisted	Sophomore	LW			1900-09-18	Salt Lake City, Utah
	(United States)	Howard B. Preble	Freshman	LW			1904-07-10	Everett, Massachusetts
	(United States)	Preston M. Putnam	Sophomore	D			1902-08-20	Danvers, Massachusetts
	(United States)	Raymond G. Putnam	Senior	R/RW			1900-05-05	Danvers, Massachusetts
	(United States)	Harold T. Stonemetz	Junior	D			1901-01-26	Newton, Massachusetts
		Tracy		RW
	(United States)	Victor S. Whitman	Junior	C			1901-04-05	Canton, Maine
	(United States)	Douglas W. Young	Sophomore	D/F			1903-12-04	Boston, Massachusetts

== Standings ==
1921–22 Eastern Collegiate ice hockey standings
	Intercollegiate							Overall					
	GP	W	L	T	Pct.	GF	GA	GP	W	L	T	GF	GA
Amherst	10	4	6	0	.400	14	15	10	4	6	0	14	15
Army	7	4	2	1	.643	23	11	9	5	3	1	26	15
Bates	7	3	4	0	.429	17	16	13	8	5	0	44	25
Boston College	3	3	0	0	1.000	16	3	8	4	3	1	23	16
Bowdoin	3	0	2	1	.167	2	4	9	2	6	1	12	18
Clarkson	1	0	1	0	.000	2	12	2	0	2	0	9	20
Colby	4	1	2	1	.375	5	13	7	3	3	1	16	25
Colgate	3	0	3	0	.000	3	14	4	0	4	0	7	24
Columbia	7	3	3	1	.500	21	24	7	3	3	1	21	24
Cornell	5	4	1	0	.800	17	10	5	4	1	0	17	10
Dartmouth	6	4	1	1	.750	10	5	6	4	1	1	10	5
Hamilton	8	7	1	0	.875	45	13	9	7	2	0	51	22
Harvard	6	6	0	0	1.000	33	5	11	8	1	2	51	17
Massachusetts Agricultural	9	5	4	0	.556	16	23	11	6	5	0	20	30
MIT	6	3	3	0	.500	14	18	10	4	6	0	–	–
Pennsylvania	7	2	5	0	.286	16	28	8	3	5	0	23	29
Princeton	7	2	5	0	.286	12	21	10	3	6	1	21	28
Rensselaer	5	0	5	0	.000	2	28	5	0	5	0	2	28
Union	0	0	0	0	–	0	0	6	2	4	0	12	12
Williams	8	3	4	1	.438	27	19	8	3	4	1	27	19
Yale	14	7	7	0	.500	46	39	19	9	10	0	55	54
YMCA College	6	2	4	0	.333	3	21	6	2	4	0	3	21

== Schedule and results ==
Date	Opponent	Site	Result	Record
Regular Season
January 7	at Bates*	Lake Andrews Rink • Lewiston, Maine	L 0–1	0–1–0
January 14	Portland Country Club*	Delta Rink • Brunswick, Maine	L 0–4	0–2–0
January 16	St. Dominique*	Delta Rink • Brunswick, Maine	W 2–1	1–2–0
January 18	at St. Dominique*	Bartlett Street Rink • Lewiston, Maine	L 1–3	1–3–0
February 9	St. Dominique*	Delta Rink • Brunswick, Maine	L 3–4 ^{OT}	1–4–0
February 11	Colby*	Delta Rink • Brunswick, Maine	L 1–2	1–5–0
February 13	at St. Dominique*	Bartlett Street Rink • Lewiston, Maine	L 0–1	1–6–0
February 17	Lewiston Independents*	Delta Rink • Brunswick, Maine	W 4–1	2–6–0
February 28	Colby*	Waterville, Maine	T 1–1	2–6–1
*Non-conference game.
