= 1921–22 MIT Engineers men's ice hockey season =

- Conference: Independent
- Home ice: Boston Arena

Record
- Overall: 4–6–0
- Home: 2–1–0
- Road: 2–1–0
- Neutral: 0–4–0

Coaches and captains
- Head coach: Eddie Powers
- Captain: Hugh Nickle

The 1921–22 MIT Engineers men's ice hockey season was the 21st season of play for the program. The Engineers were coached by Powers in his 1st season.

== Season ==
Learning from the mistakes of '21, new head coach Powers had the team hit the ice as soon as the football season had finished. The team did what they could to get ready, however, their opening match came against one of the best teams from Canada, McGill. The Redmen had no sympathy for the Engineers and steamrolled MIT 2–8. Though not unexpected, the loss was an ill omen for MIT's season and things weren't expected to get any easier in the next game. While they hadn't started the season well, Yale was still a dangerous team and never lost to MIT previously. The training that the team had undergone since early December finally paid off and the Engineers played like a well-oiled machine. MIT was outmatched by Yale's size and speed but they utilized one another to the utmost to keep the puck away from the Elis. When Yale did get control, the defense was aided by the backchecking forwards and slowed down the Bulldog attack. DuVernet was particularly conspicuous in the game and, though he failed to score, was responsible for constantly keeping the Yale defense off balance.

The historic victory for MIT spurred the team on and they took down Dalhousie in the same manner the following week. The Engineers then set their sights on Boston College and jumped out to a 2-goal lead in the first. Unfortunately, BC was one of the top offensive teams in the country and were able to claw their way back in the final two periods to give the Engineers their first intercollegiate loss of the season. The team seemed to carry their offensive hangover into the next game and were outplayed by MAC for the first two periods. Luckily, the defense held the fort and stopped everything that was thrown at Nickle. After shaking off their doldrums, MIT exploded for 6 goals, exploiting an Aggie squad that expended all of its energy in the first two periods.

With a championship still possible for the Engineers, the team entered its game with Harvard looking for a repeat of the Yale match. Early on, the MIT defense succeeded in breaking up many passing plays by the Crimson forwards. Unfortunately, once Harvard realized that teamwork wasn't succeeding, they changed to playing as individuals. Almost as soon as that happened, the Engineers' defense collapsed. MIT wasn't able to keep up with their speedier opponents and time and again a solo rush up the ice ended with a Harvard goal. To make matters worse, Harvard was also one of the best defensive teams in the country and gave the Engineers few opportunities to score. When the dust settled the score was 2–9 and any hopes that MIT had for a title had been erased.

A malaise settled over the team and the Engineers lost their next three games, culminating with the rematch with BC. The Engineers were a shell of their former selves and were easily dispatched by the Eagles 0–6. Fortunately, by the time they hit the road for the final match, the Engineers had shaken themselves out of their funk and were ready to end the season on a high note. Due to warm weather, the game was played on a nearby pond and was dominated by the rough state of the ice. DuVernet and MacNeil were outstanding in the match, stopping many rushes from Williams. captain Nickle turned aside everything that leaked through, though he did receive a penalty for kneeling on the ice to stop a shot. Goals from MacNeill and Dalton ensured that the team would head home as victors.

Frederick Kinch served as team manager.

== Roster ==
No.	Nat.	Player	Class	Pos	Height	Weight	DoB	Hometown	Previous team
	(United States)	Malcolm S. Burroughs	Senior	F			1899-07-22	Somerville, Massachusetts
	(United States)	Joseph G. Dalton	Sophomore	D/C			1899-11-12	Brookline, Massachusetts
	(United States)	John N. DuVernet	Senior	D			1897-07-08	Jamaica Plain, Massachusetts
	(United States)	Herbert L. Hayden	Junior	LW/RW			1900-02-06	Cambridge, Massachusetts
		Edward B. Johnson	Sophomore	C
	(Canada)	Neil A. MacNeil	Junior	D			1899-04-07	Grand Narrows, Nova Scotia
		Hugh D. Nickle (C)	Junior	G			1900-11-14
		Arnold F. Taylor	Junior	LW/RW
	(United States)	Harland A. Wilbur	Senior	D/LW			1901-08-02	Melrose, Massachusetts

== Standings ==
1921–22 Eastern Collegiate ice hockey standings
	Intercollegiate							Overall					
	GP	W	L	T	Pct.	GF	GA	GP	W	L	T	GF	GA
Amherst	10	4	6	0	.400	14	15	10	4	6	0	14	15
Army	7	4	2	1	.643	23	11	9	5	3	1	26	15
Bates	7	3	4	0	.429	17	16	13	8	5	0	44	25
Boston College	3	3	0	0	1.000	16	3	8	4	3	1	23	16
Bowdoin	3	0	2	1	.167	2	4	9	2	6	1	12	18
Clarkson	1	0	1	0	.000	2	12	2	0	2	0	9	20
Colby	4	1	2	1	.375	5	13	7	3	3	1	16	25
Colgate	3	0	3	0	.000	3	14	4	0	4	0	7	24
Columbia	7	3	3	1	.500	21	24	7	3	3	1	21	24
Cornell	5	4	1	0	.800	17	10	5	4	1	0	17	10
Dartmouth	6	4	1	1	.750	10	5	6	4	1	1	10	5
Hamilton	8	7	1	0	.875	45	13	9	7	2	0	51	22
Harvard	6	6	0	0	1.000	33	5	11	8	1	2	51	17
Massachusetts Agricultural	9	5	4	0	.556	16	23	11	6	5	0	20	30
MIT	6	3	3	0	.500	14	18	10	4	6	0	–	–
Pennsylvania	7	2	5	0	.286	16	28	8	3	5	0	23	29
Princeton	7	2	5	0	.286	12	21	10	3	6	1	21	28
Rensselaer	5	0	5	0	.000	2	28	5	0	5	0	2	28
Union	0	0	0	0	–	0	0	6	2	4	0	12	12
Williams	8	3	4	1	.438	27	19	8	3	4	1	27	19
Yale	14	7	7	0	.500	46	39	19	9	10	0	55	54
YMCA College	6	2	4	0	.333	3	21	6	2	4	0	3	21

== Schedule and results ==
Date	Opponent	Site	Result	Record
Regular Season
December 29	McGill*	Boston Arena • Boston, Massachusetts	L 2–8	0–1–0
January 7	at Yale*	New Haven Arena • New Haven, Connecticut	W 1–0	1–1–0
January 13	Dalhousie*	Boston Arena • Boston, Massachusetts	W 3–0	2–1–0
January 16	vs. Boston College*	Boston Arena • Boston, Massachusetts	L 2–3	2–2–0
January 20	Massachusetts Agricultural*	Boston Arena • Boston, Massachusetts	W 6–0	3–2–0
January 27	vs. Harvard*	Boston Arena • Boston, Massachusetts	L 2–9	3–3–0
February ?	Westminster Hockey Club*	Boston Arena • Boston, Massachusetts	L ?	3–4–0
February ?	vs. Boston Athletic Association*	Boston Arena • Boston, Massachusetts	L ?	3–5–0
February 17	vs. Boston College*	Boston Arena • Boston, Massachusetts	L 1–6	3–6–0
February 26	at Williams*	Leake's Pond • Williamstown, Massachusetts	W 2–0	4–6–0
*Non-conference game.
