= 1921–22 YMCA College Maroons men's ice hockey season =

- Conference: Independent
- Home ice: Pratt Field Rink

Record
- Overall: 2–4–0
- Home: 1–1–0
- Road: 1–3–0

Coaches and captains
- Head coach: Benny Leonard; George Bergini
- Captain(s): Benny Leonard; Walt Courtney

The 1921–22 YMCA College Maroons men's ice hockey season was the 18th season of play for the program.

== Season ==
The '22 season was a complete disaster for the Maroons. The year began with the team losing their coach, Paul Otto, who sited too many other responsibilities as the reason for his departure. While Benny Leonard, the team captain and manager, agreed to act as coach for the year, he was caught short and only managed to schedule 6 games. To make matters worse, J. Howard Starr, the team best defenseman, could only play on occasion due to his studies. While the team was able to get Starr in the lineup for the first game, they were missing Delano who was recovering from surgery.

A warm winter meant that most of the early-season training for the team happened off the ice and all of those degrading effects caused the Maroons to open the year with a bad defeat at the hands of Williams. The Ephs were by far the better team all game long and YMCA had no chance for victory in the match. After a subsequent loss to Amherst, Benny Leonard was admitted to hospital with acute Appendicitis and needed surgery to fix the issue. Because he was lost for the year, the team was now down to just one returning player (Courtney) with the rest of the club made up of new faces. While Courtney took over as captain, George Bergini, the coach of the Springfield Hockey Club, offered to help the team in its time of need and finished out the year as coach. Somewhat surprisingly, the team was able to win its next game but Rensselaer was and had been one of the worst programs for over a decade and the Maroons' victory had as much to do with the quality of their opponent as anything else.

The following week the team travelled to face Army and found themselves on the wrong end of a 0–7 beating. The shorthanded team got a small bit of good news heading into the rematch with Amherst; the Lord Jeffs were dealing with similar roster problems. YMCA had a chance to avenge their earlier defeat but, even handicapped, the Sabrinas were too much for the Maroons and handed them yet another shutout loss. YMCA ended the year with a second defeat of RPI, the only goal coming from Courtney. The poor but respectable record belied the terrible state the program was in. The situation was so bad that the program was shuttered for the following year.

Benny Leonard served as team manager.

== Roster ==
No.	Nat.	Player	Class	Pos	Height	Weight	DoB	Hometown	Previous team
	(United States)	Walter A. Courtney (C)	Junior	D				Maynard, Massachusetts
	(United States)	William A. Hamm	Sophomore	RW				Bridgeport, Connecticut
	(United States)	Leon L. Houston	Senior	G				Lisbon Falls, Maine
	(Canada)	John G. Lang Jr.	Sophomore	LW				St. Thomas, Ontario
	(United States)	Albert S. Leonard (C)	Senior	C			1899-02-10	Melrose, Massachusetts
	(United States)	W. T. Lindsay	Sophomore	RW				Quincy, Massachusetts
	(Canada)	D. Hector Reid	Sophomore	C				Hamilton, Ontario
	(United States)	J. Howard Starr	Senior	D			1899-07-16	New Haven, Connecticut
	(United States)	F. T. Wall	Sophomore	D/LW				Birmingham, Indiana
	(United States)	Edwin H. Ward	Senior	C/LW				Norwood, Massachusetts

== Standings ==
1921–22 Eastern Collegiate ice hockey standings
	Intercollegiate							Overall					
	GP	W	L	T	Pct.	GF	GA	GP	W	L	T	GF	GA
Amherst	10	4	6	0	.400	14	15	10	4	6	0	14	15
Army	7	4	2	1	.643	23	11	9	5	3	1	26	15
Bates	7	3	4	0	.429	17	16	13	8	5	0	44	25
Boston College	3	3	0	0	1.000	16	3	8	4	3	1	23	16
Bowdoin	3	0	2	1	.167	2	4	9	2	6	1	12	18
Clarkson	1	0	1	0	.000	2	12	2	0	2	0	9	20
Colby	4	1	2	1	.375	5	13	7	3	3	1	16	25
Colgate	3	0	3	0	.000	3	14	4	0	4	0	7	24
Columbia	7	3	3	1	.500	21	24	7	3	3	1	21	24
Cornell	5	4	1	0	.800	17	10	5	4	1	0	17	10
Dartmouth	6	4	1	1	.750	10	5	6	4	1	1	10	5
Hamilton	8	7	1	0	.875	45	13	9	7	2	0	51	22
Harvard	6	6	0	0	1.000	33	5	11	8	1	2	51	17
Massachusetts Agricultural	9	5	4	0	.556	16	23	11	6	5	0	20	30
MIT	6	3	3	0	.500	14	18	10	4	6	0	–	–
Pennsylvania	7	2	5	0	.286	16	28	8	3	5	0	23	29
Princeton	7	2	5	0	.286	12	21	10	3	6	1	21	28
Rensselaer	5	0	5	0	.000	2	28	5	0	5	0	2	28
Union	0	0	0	0	–	0	0	6	2	4	0	12	12
Williams	8	3	4	1	.438	27	19	8	3	4	1	27	19
Yale	14	7	7	0	.500	46	39	19	9	10	0	55	54
YMCA College	6	2	4	0	.333	3	21	6	2	4	0	3	21

== Schedule and results ==
Date	Opponent	Site	Result	Record
Regular Season
January 14	at Williams*	Cole Field House Rink • Williamstown, Massachusetts	L 1–8	0–1–0
January 18	Amherst*	Pratt Field Rink • Springfield, Massachusetts	L 0–5	0–2–0
January 21	at Rensselaer*	RPI Rink • Troy, New York	W 1–0	1–2–0
January 28	at Army*	Stuart Rink • West Point, New York	L 0–7	1–3–0
February 4	at Amherst*	Pratt Field Rink • Amherst, Massachusetts	L 0–2	1–4–0
February 11	Rensselaer*	Pratt Field Rink • Springfield, Massachusetts	W 1–0	2–4–0
*Non-conference game.

== Scoring statistics ==
Name	Position	Games	Goals
Walt Courtney	CP	-	2
W. Lindsay	RW	-	1
Bill Hamm	RW	-	0
Leon Houston	G	-	0
John Lang	LW	-	0
Benny Leonard	C	-	0
Hector Reid	C	-	0
Howie Starr	P	-	0
F. Wall	P/LW	-	0
Ed Ward	C/LW	-	0
Total			3
