= 1921–22 Princeton Tigers men's ice hockey season =

College ice hockey season

- Conference: 3rd THL
- Home ice: Philadelphia Ice Palace

Record
- Overall: 3–6–1
- Conference: 0–4–0
- Home: 0–2–0
- Road: 1–3–0
- Neutral: 2–1–1

Coaches and captains
- Head coach: Moylan McDonnell
- Captain: Eugene Maxwell

The 1921–22 Princeton Tigers men's ice hockey season was the 22nd season of play for the program. The Tigers were coached Moylan McDonnell in his 1st season.

== Season ==
Entering the year, several changes were afoot for the Tigers. The program's first official head coach, Russell Ellis, left after just one season. In order to keep the team atop the college hockey landscape, the school turned to NHL veteran Moylan McDonnell, hoping he could get Princeton to keep pace with its conference foes. While they awaited the arrival of their new coach, the team began training under the supervision of team captain Eugene Maxwell. 34 men showed up for the initial practice, including several returning players, but the team would have to contend with the loss of three starters due to graduation.

The Intercollegiate Athletic Association met prior to the season and agreed to several rule changes. Chief among these was officially dispensing with 7-man hockey, a move that Harvard had been loath to accept. Also, while player substitutions were only allowed during stoppages in play, the number of substitutions would be unlimited. Following the trend set by football teams, all players were now required to wear numbers on their uniform for identification. Additionally, all games would have three periods of 15 minutes each, weather permitting. In the event of a tie, two 5-minute periods would be used to try and settle the score. If the game was tied after the overtime session, the match would be called as a draw. All minor penalties would be 2 minutes in length while major offenses would be 4 minutes. While these rule changes would only affect league games, many other programs would utilize the same or similar framework.

As the team was preparing itself for the trip up to Lake Placid, the program received a major boon. An anonymous donor gave the university $100,000 to build the program's first artificial rink. Plans for the new building were put into motion right away and the school broke ground before the end of the month. While the rink would not be ready until the following year, Princeton would become just the second college in the country to have an on-campus home venue when the Hobey Baker Memorial Rink opened in 1923.

By the time McDonnell took over the team in mid-December, the Tigers' roster was mostly sorted out and he only had to make the final few cuts to decide who would be going on the Christmas trip. Upon their arrival, the team got to work and prepared for the first match of the year. They proved to be far superior than a local aggregation, pounding the Lake Placid Snowbirds 6–0, but the faced a tougher test from the Victoria Hockey Club. The Tigers held their own against the Canadians in the first match but they ran out of season the following evening and suffered their first loss of the year.

The team had little time to reflect on their trip as they faced their first intercollegiate opponent on January 6. Fortunately, the trip appeared to put the team in good standing and the Tigers brushed Penn away with a 4–0 victory. While Maxwell held the Quakers scoreless, Howell Van Gerbig scored all four goals for the Tigers, providing the best singular performance for the Tigers in years. The next game with Columbia was delayed for a week and caused their next match to be played against Yale. Unfortunately, the team was bitten by the injury bug heading into the contest. Already missing Merritt, who was injured at Lake Placid, the team lost one of their defensive starters, Wall. Burnham, who had taken Merritt's place on the wing, was shifted back to defense while Jackson, Jewett and Powers were given practice time on the wing. Merritt and Wall were both able to play in the game but were limited in play. Jackson ended up subbing in for both during the match. Once the game began, Corcoran took over on offense, giving Princeton a 2-goal lead early in the second. Unfortunately, Yale refused to lay down and fought back to tie the game in the third to force overtime. Burnham gave Princeton their second lead early in the first 5-minute period but the Elis tied the game almost immediately. Near the end of the second overtime the puck found its way behind Maxwell and sunk the hopes of the Tigers.

After playing such a strong game against Yale, Princeton was expected to have a fairly easy match against Columbia. The Lions had other ideas and used both clever teamwork and a distinct home ice advantage to hand the Tigers their third loss. Van Gerbig was shifted to defense due to Wall's lingering injury but the forward line was well regarded as Merritt, Jackson and Corcoran each scored in the game. The game went into overtime and Columbia got into the lead after just 15 seconds. Despite having nearly 10 minutes to tie the score, Princeton was unable to find the twine in either extra session. The end of the week saw Princeton take on Harvard in Philadelphia and put forth a much better performance against the vaunted Crimson. Maxwell made several outstanding saves in the contest and held the Bostonians back for the first 25 minutes of the match. Harvard's defense, however, was even stronger and prevented the Tigers from scoring a single goal.

With losses now to both conference teams, Princeton could ill afford any more defeats. Sadler was added to the lineup, sliding in at wing which allowed Merritt to drop back to defense. The moves appeared to work and Princeton won the game despite a rather slow pace of play. The remade defense continued to show out in the rematch with Yale, however, the offense was weakened in the effort. Neither team was able to score except for a fluke play in the middle of the second period; when Maxwell reached up to stop a long shot, the puck deflected off of his glove, hit the crossbar and bounced to the ice just inside the goal. While the result demonstrated that there was little to separate either squad, Yale had finished atop in both contests and rendered it nearly impossible for Princeton to claim any success on the season. The season ended with a lackluster performance against Harvard that saw the Crimson run away with the game in the second half. The addition of Norrie at center did nothing to help the Princeton offense who were shutout for the fourth time that season.

== Roster ==
No.	Nat.	Player	Class	Pos	Height	Weight	DoB	Hometown	Previous team
	(United States)	Gordon W. Burnham Jr.	Sophomore				1901-10-08	New York, New York
		Francis L. Corcoran	Senior	C/LW			1899-04-03
	(United States)	William H. Jackson	Sophomore	D/F			1901-03-25	Belle Meade, Tennessee
	(United States)	John H. Jewett	Junior	LW			1902-02-21
	(United States)	Eugene L. Maxwell (C)	Senior	G				Brooklyn, New York
	(United States)	Schuyler Merritt II	Senior	D/RW				Eastchester, New York
		Lewis G. Norrie	Sophomore	C			1901-12-25
		William S. Powers	Junior	LW/RW
		Houstoun M. Sadler	Sophomore	RW
	(United States)	John L. Tallman	Senior	D/LW			1898-11-16	New York, New York
	(United States)	Howell Van Gerbig	Sophomore	D/C			1902-06-19	New York, New York
	(United States)	Albert C. Wall	Sophomore	D/LW			1902-02-12	South Orange, New Jersey

== Standings ==
1921–22 Eastern Collegiate ice hockey standings
	Intercollegiate							Overall					
	GP	W	L	T	Pct.	GF	GA	GP	W	L	T	GF	GA
Amherst	10	4	6	0	.400	14	15	10	4	6	0	14	15
Army	7	4	2	1	.643	23	11	9	5	3	1	26	15
Bates	7	3	4	0	.429	17	16	13	8	5	0	44	25
Boston College	3	3	0	0	1.000	16	3	8	4	3	1	23	16
Bowdoin	3	0	2	1	.167	2	4	9	2	6	1	12	18
Clarkson	1	0	1	0	.000	2	12	2	0	2	0	9	20
Colby	4	1	2	1	.375	5	13	7	3	3	1	16	25
Colgate	3	0	3	0	.000	3	14	4	0	4	0	7	24
Columbia	7	3	3	1	.500	21	24	7	3	3	1	21	24
Cornell	5	4	1	0	.800	17	10	5	4	1	0	17	10
Dartmouth	6	4	1	1	.750	10	5	6	4	1	1	10	5
Hamilton	8	7	1	0	.875	45	13	9	7	2	0	51	22
Harvard	6	6	0	0	1.000	33	5	11	8	1	2	51	17
Massachusetts Agricultural	9	5	4	0	.556	16	23	11	6	5	0	20	30
MIT	6	3	3	0	.500	14	18	10	4	6	0	–	–
Pennsylvania	7	2	5	0	.286	16	28	8	3	5	0	23	29
Princeton	7	2	5	0	.286	12	21	10	3	6	1	21	28
Rensselaer	5	0	5	0	.000	2	28	5	0	5	0	2	28
Union	0	0	0	0	–	0	0	6	2	4	0	12	12
Williams	8	3	4	1	.438	27	19	8	3	4	1	27	19
Yale	14	7	7	0	.500	46	39	19	9	10	0	55	54
YMCA College	6	2	4	0	.333	3	21	6	2	4	0	3	21

1921–22 Triangular Hockey League standings
	Conference								Overall					
	GP	W	L	T	PTS	SW	GF	GA	GP	W	L	T	GF	GA
Harvard *	4	4	0	0	1.000	2	21	3	11	8	1	2	51	17
Yale	4	2	2	0	.500	1	8	12	19	9	10	0	55	54
Princeton	4	0	4	0	.000	0	3	17	10	3	6	1	21	27
* indicates conference champion

== Schedule and results ==
Date	Opponent	Site	Result	Record
Regular Season
December 30	at Snowbirds*	Lake Placid Arena • Lake Placid, New York	W 6–0	1–0–0
December 31	vs. Victoria Hockey Club*	Lake Placid Arena • Lake Placid, New York	T 3–3	1–0–1
January 1	vs. Victoria Hockey Club*	Lake Placid Arena • Lake Placid, New York	L 0–4	1–1–1
January 6	vs. Pennsylvania*	Philadelphia Ice Palace • Philadelphia, Pennsylvania	W 4–0	2–1–1
January 14	at Yale	Philadelphia Ice Palace • Philadelphia, Pennsylvania	L 3–4 ^{2OT}	2–2–1 (0–1–0)
January 18	at Columbia*	181st Street Ice Palace • Manhattan, New York	L 3–4 ^{OT}	2–3–1
January 21	Harvard	Philadelphia Ice Palace • Philadelphia, Pennsylvania	L 0–3	2–4–1 (0–2–0)
January 27	vs. Pennsylvania*	Philadelphia Ice Palace • Philadelphia, Pennsylvania	W 2–0	3–4–1
February 4	Yale	Philadelphia Ice Palace • Philadelphia, Pennsylvania	L 0–1	3–5–1 (0–3–0)
February 18	at Harvard	Boston Arena • Boston, Massachusetts	L 0–9	3–6–1 (0–4–0)
*Non-conference game.
