= 1921–22 Bates men's ice hockey season =

Intercollegiate hockey season

- Conference: Independent
- Home ice: Lake Andrews

Record
- Overall: 8–5–0
- Home: 7–0–0
- Road: 0–5–0
- Neutral: 1–0–0

Coaches and captains
- Head coach: Raymond A. Watkins
- Captain: Carl Rounds

The 1921–22 Bates men's ice hockey season was the 3rd season of play for the program.

== Season ==
Under new head coach, "Razor" Watkins, the Bates hockey team convened in early December and put together an ambitious schedule that had them playing as many as 16 games. Probably the biggest change for the club was the final decision to transition away from the rover position, as most colleges had already dispensed with the extra player in recent years. Bates had played 7-man hockey for all but one game over the previous two years but, as most of their opponents had bent to the 6-man trend, Bates had to follow suit. The team spent a month getting into shape and welcomed their old foe Bowdoin after returning from the winter break. The first half was played with a rover and the second without. However, the biggest factor in the match was the poor condition of the ice. The pace was slow and stopped either team from getting much in the way of offensive chances. After a scoreless first, Roberts netted the games only goal midway through the second and led Bates to their first win of the season.

The second game a week later saw Bates dominate the local St. Dominique team. A hat-trick from Cogan in the second period allowed coach Watkins to use alternates in all 6 positions for the third period and cruise to a 4–0 win. A day later, the team was in Berlin to take on a very strong amateur squad. The team was outmatched by their opponents and were outshot 10 to 40 in the game but gave the crowd of 700 a decent showing nonetheless. After a few cancellations and postponements, Army was up next for the club as the team went on its longest road trip to date. Batten was nearly as busy as he had been against Berlin and stopped 32 shots but, due a lack of offense, the team lost the match 1–4 with Cogan scoring their only goal. That trend continued as the team made a layover in Amherst, losing a pair of games with only one goal to show for their efforts. The garnet looked better in the final match against Yale, holing a lead going into the third period, but ultimately fell 3–5.

Despite playing well in many of their games, the team's record was in a horrible state by the beginning of February due to poor offensive output. The team had some time off before their next match and made the most of it. By the time they hosted the Portland Country Club, the offense was in fine form. While the team was without captain Rounds, McKenna and Dagnino played a strong game on defense with Partridge taking over in the goal. Though the game was only 30 minutes in length, Bates pumped 4 goals into the opposing cage, producing their best offensive performance to date. A few days later the team took the hammer to a local aggregation and allowed just 3 shots on goal to the Lewiston Independents. The game was so lopsided that Hinds got some playing time in goal despite the game being just 20 minutes in length.

The rematch with St. Dominique's was even better than the original with Roberts, Stanley and Dagnino each netting a pair of goals while Cogan, the team's leading scorer, posted 4 for himself. The next night the team was in Augusta, vying for supremacy with Colby. Due to the small size of the rink, the game was rough and a bit ragged but the Garnet got three goals from Stanley to lead them to Victory. With the earlier win over Bowdoin, Bates claimed the state intercollegiate championship and appeared to have fully recovered from their early-season scoring woes. A week later Colby came to Lewiston for a rematch and they were easily dispatched 7–0. Cogan recorded another hat-trick in the match but the victory was a total team effort. The club finished out the year with one more victory over St. Dominique to post the program's first winning season.

On several occasions, a rematch with Bowdoin was arranged only for winter storms to force its cancellation. Despite the best efforts of both schools, a rematch never took place.

W. Gurney Jenkins served as team manager.

Note: Bates did not adopt the 'Bobcats' moniker until 1924.

== Roster ==
No.	Nat.	Player	Class	Pos	Height	Weight	DoB	Hometown	Previous team
	(United States)	Morton C. Bartlett	Freshman	R/LW			1901-08-07	Plymouth, Massachusetts
	(United States)	Raymond J. Batten	Junior	G			1901-03-09	Wakefield, Massachusetts
	(United States)	Chester F. Cleaves	Junior	LW			1901-10-31	Buxton, Maine
	(United States)	Joseph W. Cogan	Sophomore	C			1902-01-01	Stoneham, Massachusetts
	(United States)	Edmond F. Dagnino	Freshman	D			1903-05-19	Boston, Massachusetts
	(United States)	Raymond P. Hinds	Freshman	G			1902-12-03	Gardiner, Maine
		George F. Jackson	Freshman	RW
		George H. McKenna	Freshman	D/F
	(United States)	John F. O'Connor	Freshman	R/D/C/LW			1901-13-01	Dorchester, Massachusetts
	(United States)	Robert M. Partridge	Sophomore	G			1901-12-15	Andover, Massachusetts
	(United States)	Edward F. Roberts	Junior	LW			1901-10-14	Presque Isle, Maine
	(United States)	Carl P. Rounds (C)	Senior	D			1898-01-01	Minot, Maine
	(United States)	Richard J. Stanley	Sophomore	RW			1902-08-20	Lewiston, Maine

== Standings ==
1921–22 Eastern Collegiate ice hockey standings
	Intercollegiate							Overall					
	GP	W	L	T	Pct.	GF	GA	GP	W	L	T	GF	GA
Amherst	10	4	6	0	.400	14	15	10	4	6	0	14	15
Army	7	4	2	1	.643	23	11	9	5	3	1	26	15
Bates	7	3	4	0	.429	17	16	13	8	5	0	44	25
Boston College	3	3	0	0	1.000	16	3	8	4	3	1	23	16
Bowdoin	3	0	2	1	.167	2	4	9	2	6	1	12	18
Clarkson	1	0	1	0	.000	2	12	2	0	2	0	9	20
Colby	4	1	2	1	.375	5	13	7	3	3	1	16	25
Colgate	3	0	3	0	.000	3	14	4	0	4	0	7	24
Columbia	7	3	3	1	.500	21	24	7	3	3	1	21	24
Cornell	5	4	1	0	.800	17	10	5	4	1	0	17	10
Dartmouth	6	4	1	1	.750	10	5	6	4	1	1	10	5
Hamilton	8	7	1	0	.875	45	13	9	7	2	0	51	22
Harvard	6	6	0	0	1.000	33	5	11	8	1	2	51	17
Massachusetts Agricultural	9	5	4	0	.556	16	23	11	6	5	0	20	30
MIT	6	3	3	0	.500	14	18	10	4	6	0	–	–
Pennsylvania	7	2	5	0	.286	16	28	8	3	5	0	23	29
Princeton	7	2	5	0	.286	12	21	10	3	6	1	21	28
Rensselaer	5	0	5	0	.000	2	28	5	0	5	0	2	28
Union	0	0	0	0	–	0	0	6	2	4	0	12	12
Williams	8	3	4	1	.438	27	19	8	3	4	1	27	19
Yale	14	7	7	0	.500	46	39	19	9	10	0	55	54
YMCA College	6	2	4	0	.333	3	21	6	2	4	0	3	21

== Schedule and results ==
Date	Opponent	Site	Result	Record
Regular Season
January 7	Bowdoin*	Lake Andrews Rink • Lewiston, Maine	W 1–0	1–0–0
January 13	St. Dominique's*	Lake Andrews Rink • Lewiston, Maine	W 4–0	2–0–0
January 14	at Berlin*	Berlin, New Hampshire	L 1–7	2–1–0
January 25	at Army*	Stuart Rink • West Point, New York	L 1–4	2–2–0
January 26	at Massachusetts Agricultural*	Alumni Field Rink • Amherst, Massachusetts	L 0–2	2–3–0
January 27	at Amherst*	Pratt Field Rink • Amherst, Massachusetts	L 1–3	2–4–0
January 28	at Yale*	New Haven Arena • New Haven, Connecticut	L 3–5	2–5–0
February 8	Portland Country Club*	Lake Andrews Rink • Lewiston, Maine	W 4–1	3–5–0
February 11	Lewiston Independents*	Lake Andrews Rink • Lewiston, Maine	W 6–0	4–5–0
February 17	St. Dominique's*	Lake Andrews Rink • Lewiston, Maine	W 10–0	5–5–0
February 18	vs. Colby*	Capital Park Rink • Augusta, Maine	W 4–2	6–5–0
February 25	Colby*	Lake Andrews Rink • Lewiston, Maine	W 7–0	7–5–0
?	St. Dominique's*	Lake Andrews Rink • Lewiston, Maine	W 2–1	8–5–0
*Non-conference game.

† Colby did not field a varsity team at this time.
