= 1921–22 Colby Mules men's ice hockey season =

- Conference: Independent

Record
- Overall: 3–3–1
- Home: 1–0–1
- Road: 1–2–0
- Neutral: 1–1–0

Coaches and captains
- Head coach: Richard Wason
- Captain: Grenville Vale

The 1921–22 Colby Mules men's ice hockey season was the inaugural season of play for the program.

== Season ==
After an informal team the year before, the athletic department gave its blessing on the official status of the ice hockey team for this season. However, while the team was able to wear the school colors, they received precious little in terms of support from the college. The players lacked equipment, a home venue, a full time coach and funding of any kind. Worse, the team was also handicapped by the paucity of candidates for the team with most having never played the game before. Just 12 students attended the first workout for the club and, though prospects weren't great, the team was still able to enter itself into the competition for the Maine Intercollegiate Hockey Championship with Bates and Bowdoin. Freshman Richard Watson assumed the coaching responsibilities while Grenville Vale was elected team captain.

Owing to their late start, the team played just one game in January. While they took their opening match, the haphazard play caused the team to redouble its training efforts for when they resumed after the exam break. They looked much more composed in their contest versus Maine, who were playing on an informal basis, and then extended their winning streak to 3 with a downing of the Polar Bears. Three difficult games at the end of the month not only put the state championship out of reach, but gave the distinct possibility that the Mules would finish with a losing record. The final match was played at home against Bowdoin, however, because of poor ice the game was ragged and slow. The two ended the match tied at 1-all and Colby was able to end its first season successfully with a mediocre record.

C. Harry Edwards served as team manager.

== Roster ==
No.	Nat.	Player	Class	Pos	Height	Weight	DoB	Hometown	Previous team
	(United States)	John L. Berry	Sophomore	G				Jeffersonville, Vermont
	(United States)	Samuel P. Huhn Jr.	Freshman	RW				Philadelphia, Pennsylvania
	(United States)	Louis R. McBay	Freshman	D				New Bedford, Massachusetts
	(United States)	Richard J. Pike	Freshman					Winthrop, Massachusetts
	(United States)	Grenville B. E. Vale (C)	Sophomore	C				Glen Cove, New York
	(United States)	Richard A. Wason	Freshman	LW				Cambridge, Massachusetts
	(United States)	Ralph C. Young	Freshman	D				Overbrook, Pennsylvania

== Standings ==
1921–22 Eastern Collegiate ice hockey standings
	Intercollegiate							Overall					
	GP	W	L	T	Pct.	GF	GA	GP	W	L	T	GF	GA
Amherst	10	4	6	0	.400	14	15	10	4	6	0	14	15
Army	7	4	2	1	.643	23	11	9	5	3	1	26	15
Bates	7	3	4	0	.429	17	16	13	8	5	0	44	25
Boston College	3	3	0	0	1.000	16	3	8	4	3	1	23	16
Bowdoin	3	0	2	1	.167	2	4	9	2	6	1	12	18
Clarkson	1	0	1	0	.000	2	12	2	0	2	0	9	20
Colby	4	1	2	1	.375	5	13	7	3	3	1	16	25
Colgate	3	0	3	0	.000	3	14	4	0	4	0	7	24
Columbia	7	3	3	1	.500	21	24	7	3	3	1	21	24
Cornell	5	4	1	0	.800	17	10	5	4	1	0	17	10
Dartmouth	6	4	1	1	.750	10	5	6	4	1	1	10	5
Hamilton	8	7	1	0	.875	45	13	9	7	2	0	51	22
Harvard	6	6	0	0	1.000	33	5	11	8	1	2	51	17
Massachusetts Agricultural	9	5	4	0	.556	16	23	11	6	5	0	20	30
MIT	6	3	3	0	.500	14	18	10	4	6	0	–	–
Pennsylvania	7	2	5	0	.286	16	28	8	3	5	0	23	29
Princeton	7	2	5	0	.286	12	21	10	3	6	1	21	28
Rensselaer	5	0	5	0	.000	2	28	5	0	5	0	2	28
Union	0	0	0	0	–	0	0	6	2	4	0	12	12
Williams	8	3	4	1	.438	27	19	8	3	4	1	27	19
Yale	14	7	7	0	.500	46	39	19	9	10	0	55	54
YMCA College	6	2	4	0	.333	3	21	6	2	4	0	3	21

== Schedule and results ==
Date	Opponent	Site	Result	Record
Regular Season
January 19	vs. Waterville Hockey Club*	Paine's Rink • Waterville, Maine	W 4–3	1–0–0
February 10	at Maine ^{†}*	Orono, Maine	W 5–3	2–0–0
February 11	at Bowdoin*	Delta Rink • Brunswick, Maine	W 2–1	3–0–0
February 18	vs. Bates*	Capital Park Rink • Augusta, Maine	L 2–4	3–1–0
February 24	at St. Dominique*	Bartlett Street Rink • Lewiston, Maine	L 2–6	3–2–0
February 25	at Bates*	Lake Andrews Rink • Lewiston, Maine	L 0–7	3–3–0
February 28	Bowdoin*	Paine's Rink • Waterville, Maine	T 1–1	3–3–1
*Non-conference game.

† Maine fielded an informal club team at this time.
