= 1921–22 Boston College Eagles men's ice hockey season =

- Conference: Independent
- Home ice: Boston Arena

Record
- Overall: 4–3–1
- Home: 0–2–1
- Road: 2–0–0
- Neutral: 2–1–0

Coaches and captains
- Head coach: Fred Rocque
- Captain: Leo Hughes

The 1921–22 Boston College Eagles men's ice hockey season was the 5th season of play for the program. The Eagles were coached by Fred Rocque in his 2nd season.

== Season ==
After two fantastic seasons, Boston College was expected to do even better in 1922 with their captain, Leo Hughes, now recovered from a knee injury that had hampered him all of last season. Rather than wait until January for the team to begin, the Eagles kicked off the year with a few preliminary games in December. The team looked a bit slow against St. Paul's School but the defense was good enough to lead them to victory.

Over the Christmas break, the Eagles joined three other teams for an exhibition at the Boston Arena. Boston College could hardly have played worse in the first game, looking like a collection of individuals rather than a team. The BC boys lost to Pere Marquette and were so chastised by the result that they redoubled their efforts in the second game. McGill was one of the best college teams in Canada and while they finished their residency with an unblemished record, the Eagles gave them the toughest fight of their trip.

The Eagles tried to work on their issues leading into the first intercollegiate match with MIT, but weren't quite up to par when the game started. BC found itself down 0–2 after a sluggish first but the Eagles quickly picked up the slack in the middle frame and scored three unanswered goals to escape with a win. Boston College then got into a fight with an amateur team, the Melrose Hockey Club. The Eagles were hamstrung by injuries and used mostly reserves in the game which led to a more even match. In the brief time when starters were on the ice, BC got its only goal of the game and ended regulation tied at 1-all. Due to the impending game with Yale, the two sides agreed to forgo overtime with the possibility of playing the game off later. The Bulldogs arrived two days later in the midst of a down season (by their standards) but were still a dangerous club. The Eagles took no chances and slew the Eli dragon with a 7–0 shellacking. Hughes, Curry and Donnellan, who had all been injured prior to the game, showed no signs of impairment and ran roughshod over the Yale defense.

After the stunning win, the Eagles were regarded as a potential championship club, however, they had little chance left to make an impact. While undefeated in intercollegiate play, BC had only played two matches and both were against teams with middling records. BC had just one game left on its schedule against a fellow college, a rematch with MIT, that would hardly improve their standing. If the non-college games were included, BC would have even less of a chance at a championship as they team had not fared particularly well in those contests. While they got ready to face the Boston Athletic Association, the Eagles set about trying to get additional games added to their slate but, at this late of a date, that was all but impossible. After losing to the semi-pro team, BC vastly outplayed the Engineers in the rematch.

With their season now complete, the team had pretentions (perhaps unjustified) about being championship-worth as they had defeated all collegiate opponents. Harvard was the only other school to boast such a claim, however, the Crimson had also tied the B.A.A. and defeated St. Paul's School 9–1 while also going 3–0 against Yale and MIT. Harvard had a stronger case for the title and were proclaimed by many as the Intercollegiate champions. However, the two captains on the teams, Hughes and George Owen, had played together on the ice hockey team at Newton High School. They were able to come to an arrangement to play one another at the end of the season, but there was a caveat. Harvard would only play an exhibition match, meaning the Crimson would not risk losing the claim for the championship. With no recourse, the Eagles agreed to the terms and met Harvard in early March. To ensure the unofficial status of the game, three of Harvard's regulars (Owen, Higgins and Walker) did not participate and were replaced by players who were members of the freshman team. Harvard dubbed the group the 'Crimson Ramblers'. However, even with the Crimson short-handed, BC was not able to overcome Harvard in regulation. Before a packed crowd at the Boston Arena, Boston College fought a defensive struggle against Harvard and took a narrow lead into the third period. A desperate big for a goal in the waning moments succeeded and Harvard forced overtime. The third period exertions appeared to sap the strength from the Ramblers and BC was able to score twice in the two extra periods. Though victorious, the win was a hollow one for the Eagles as it didn't stop Harvard from not only claiming the championship but being viewed as the better team.

Ralph Shea served as team manager.

== Roster ==
No.	Nat.	Player	Class	Pos	Height	Weight	DoB	Hometown	Previous team
	(United States)	John F. Culhane	Freshman	LW				Cambridge, Massachusetts
	(United States)	John R. Curry	Junior	RW				Cambridge, Massachusetts
		Charles Donnellan		LW
	(United States)	John C. Fitzgerald	Freshman	G				Cambridge, Massachusetts
	(United States)	James H. Foley	Freshman	RW			1901-10-28	Cambridge, Massachusetts
	(United States)	T. Edmund Garrity	Junior	D				Belmont, Massachusetts
	(United States)	S. Leo Hughes	Senior	C				Newton, Massachusetts
	(United States)	Leonard G. Morrissey	Junior	D				Medford, Massachusetts
	(United States)	Daniel J. Murphy	Sophomore	G				Arlington, Massachusetts

== Standings ==
1921–22 Eastern Collegiate ice hockey standings
	Intercollegiate							Overall					
	GP	W	L	T	Pct.	GF	GA	GP	W	L	T	GF	GA
Amherst	10	4	6	0	.400	14	15	10	4	6	0	14	15
Army	7	4	2	1	.643	23	11	9	5	3	1	26	15
Bates	7	3	4	0	.429	17	16	13	8	5	0	44	25
Boston College	3	3	0	0	1.000	16	3	8	4	3	1	23	16
Bowdoin	3	0	2	1	.167	2	4	9	2	6	1	12	18
Clarkson	1	0	1	0	.000	2	12	2	0	2	0	9	20
Colby	4	1	2	1	.375	5	13	7	3	3	1	16	25
Colgate	3	0	3	0	.000	3	14	4	0	4	0	7	24
Columbia	7	3	3	1	.500	21	24	7	3	3	1	21	24
Cornell	5	4	1	0	.800	17	10	5	4	1	0	17	10
Dartmouth	6	4	1	1	.750	10	5	6	4	1	1	10	5
Hamilton	8	7	1	0	.875	45	13	9	7	2	0	51	22
Harvard	6	6	0	0	1.000	33	5	11	8	1	2	51	17
Massachusetts Agricultural	9	5	4	0	.556	16	23	11	6	5	0	20	30
MIT	6	3	3	0	.500	14	18	10	4	6	0	–	–
Pennsylvania	7	2	5	0	.286	16	28	8	3	5	0	23	29
Princeton	7	2	5	0	.286	12	21	10	3	6	1	21	28
Rensselaer	5	0	5	0	.000	2	28	5	0	5	0	2	28
Union	0	0	0	0	–	0	0	6	2	4	0	12	12
Williams	8	3	4	1	.438	27	19	8	3	4	1	27	19
Yale	14	7	7	0	.500	46	39	19	9	10	0	55	54
YMCA College	6	2	4	0	.333	3	21	6	2	4	0	3	21

== Schedule and results ==
Date	Opponent	Site	Result	Record
Regular Season
December 17	at St. Paul's School*	St. Paul's Rink • Concord, New Hampshire	W 2–0	1–0–0
December 26	Pere Marquette ^{†}*	Boston Arena • Boston, Massachusetts	L 2–5	1–1–0
December 30	McGill*	Boston Arena • Boston, Massachusetts	L 0–3	1–2–0
January 16	vs. MIT*	Boston Arena • Boston, Massachusetts	W 3–2	2–2–0
January 19	Melrose Hockey Club*	Boston Arena • Boston, Massachusetts	T 1–1	2–2–1
January 21	at Yale*	New Haven Arena • New Haven, Connecticut	W 7–0	3–2–1
February 9	vs. Boston Athletic Association*	Boston Arena • Boston, Massachusetts	L 2–4	3–3–1
February 17	vs. MIT*	Boston Arena • Boston, Massachusetts	W 6–1	4–3–1
March 2	vs. Harvard Ramblers*	Boston Arena • Boston, Massachusetts (Exhibition)	W 4–2 ^{2OT}	
*Non-conference game.

†: Some contemporary BC accounts list this game as an exhibition match but that may be a stylistic designation rather than an official one.
