= 1921–22 Yale Bulldogs men's ice hockey season =

College ice hockey season

- Conference: 2nd THL
- Home ice: New Haven Arena

Record
- Overall: 9–10–0
- Conference: 2–2–0
- Home: 6–7–0
- Road: 1–3–0
- Neutral: 2–0–0

Coaches and captains
- Head coach: Clarence Wanamaker
- Captain: Clement Griscom

The 1921–22 Yale Bulldogs men's ice hockey season was the 27th season of play for the program.

== Season ==
After struggling through the previous two seasons, Yale brought in their third coach in as many years. The hiring of Clarence Wanamaker from Dartmouth brought about a resurgence for the program, not least of which because the Bulldogs returned to their expansive schedule that was characteristic of the team before World War I. In another return to form, the New Haven Arena began to host ice hockey games for the first time in years and Yale would finally have a local home after having to play as vagabonds since the start of the war.

Yale played inconsistently throughout the year, playing well in some games and poorly in others. The highlight of the season was winning both games against Princeton, guaranteeing themselves at least a second-place finish in the Triangular League. The experience the players gained from the nineteen games, however, would pay dividends in the coming years.

== Roster ==
No.	Nat.	Player	Class	Pos	Height	Weight	DoB	Hometown	Previous team
1	(United States)	Clement A. Griscom III	Senior	D			1899-03-13	Philadelphia, Pennsylvania
2	(United States)	Charles M. O'Hearn	Sophomore	D				Brookline, Massachusetts
3		Reginald Foster Jr.	Senior	C/LW
4	(United States)	Winfield K. Shiras Jr.	Junior	LW			1900-10-20	Pittsburgh, Pennsylvania
5		Fergus Reid Jr.	Junior	C/RW
6		Alfred O. Norris	Sophomore	D
7		Archibald M. Bell Jr.	Junior	G
8		Frank E. Vogel		G
9		William Chisholm II	Sophomore	RW
10	(United States)	Vincent Farnsworth Jr.	Sophomore	C/LW			1901-04-11	Revere, Massachusetts
11	(United States)	H. Dillingham Palmer		C/LW/RW				Summit, New Jersey
12	(United States)	Jack G. F. Speiden	Senior	D			1900-03-04	Summit, New Jersey
13	(United States)	Wells C. Root		G			1900-03-21	Buffalo, New York
		Jonathan O. Bulkley	Junior	C/LW
		Henry T. Bushnell	Senior	D
		Edward G. Murray		LW/RW

== Standings ==
1921–22 Eastern Collegiate ice hockey standings
	Intercollegiate							Overall					
	GP	W	L	T	Pct.	GF	GA	GP	W	L	T	GF	GA
Amherst	10	4	6	0	.400	14	15	10	4	6	0	14	15
Army	7	4	2	1	.643	23	11	9	5	3	1	26	15
Bates	7	3	4	0	.429	17	16	13	8	5	0	44	25
Boston College	3	3	0	0	1.000	16	3	8	4	3	1	23	16
Bowdoin	3	0	2	1	.167	2	4	9	2	6	1	12	18
Clarkson	1	0	1	0	.000	2	12	2	0	2	0	9	20
Colby	4	1	2	1	.375	5	13	7	3	3	1	16	25
Colgate	3	0	3	0	.000	3	14	4	0	4	0	7	24
Columbia	7	3	3	1	.500	21	24	7	3	3	1	21	24
Cornell	5	4	1	0	.800	17	10	5	4	1	0	17	10
Dartmouth	6	4	1	1	.750	10	5	6	4	1	1	10	5
Hamilton	8	7	1	0	.875	45	13	9	7	2	0	51	22
Harvard	6	6	0	0	1.000	33	5	11	8	1	2	51	17
Massachusetts Agricultural	9	5	4	0	.556	16	23	11	6	5	0	20	30
MIT	6	3	3	0	.500	14	18	10	4	6	0	–	–
Pennsylvania	7	2	5	0	.286	16	28	8	3	5	0	23	29
Princeton	7	2	5	0	.286	12	21	10	3	6	1	21	28
Rensselaer	5	0	5	0	.000	2	28	5	0	5	0	2	28
Union	0	0	0	0	–	0	0	6	2	4	0	12	12
Williams	8	3	4	1	.438	27	19	8	3	4	1	27	19
Yale	14	7	7	0	.500	46	39	19	9	10	0	55	54
YMCA College	6	2	4	0	.333	3	21	6	2	4	0	3	21

1921–22 Triangular Hockey League standings
	Conference								Overall					
	GP	W	L	T	PTS	SW	GF	GA	GP	W	L	T	GF	GA
Harvard *	4	4	0	0	1.000	2	21	3	11	8	1	2	51	17
Yale	4	2	2	0	.500	1	8	12	19	9	10	0	55	54
Princeton	4	0	4	0	.000	0	3	17	10	3	6	1	21	27
* indicates conference champion

== Schedule and results ==
Date	Opponent	Site	Result	Record
Regular season
December 10	St. Nicholas Hockey Club*	New Haven Arena • New Haven, Connecticut	L 1–5	0–1–0
December 14	Columbia*	New Haven Arena • New Haven, Connecticut	W 10–2	1–1–0
December 17	at Pennsylvania*	Philadelphia Ice Palace • Philadelphia, Pennsylvania	L 2–4	1–2–0
December 19	at Quaker City Hockey Club*	Philadelphia Ice Palace • Philadelphia, Pennsylvania	L 1–5	1–3–0
January 4	vs. New Haven Bears*	New Haven Arena • New Haven, Connecticut	W 4–2	2–3–0
January 7	MIT*	New Haven Arena • New Haven, Connecticut	L 0–1	2–4–0
January 11	Pennsylvania*	New Haven Arena • New Haven, Connecticut	W 8–3	3–4–0
January 14	Princeton	New Haven Arena • New Haven, Connecticut	W 4–3 ^{2OT}	4–4–0 (1–0–0)
January 18	Massachusetts Agricultural*	New Haven Arena • New Haven, Connecticut	L 2–3	4–5–0
January 21	Boston College*	New Haven Arena • New Haven, Connecticut	L 0–7	4–6–0
January 28	Bates*	New Haven Arena • New Haven, Connecticut	W 5–3	5–6–0
February 4	vs. Princeton	Philadelphia Ice Palace • Philadelphia, Pennsylvania	W 1–0	6–6–0 (2–0–0)
February 6	Dartmouth*	New Haven Arena • New Haven, Connecticut	L 1–2	6–7–0
February 11	at Harvard	Boston Arena • Boston, Massachusetts (Rivalry)	L 2–6	6–8–0 (2–1–0)
February 13	at St. Paul's School	St. Paul's Rink • Concord, New Hampshire	W 2–0	7–8–0
February 15	Williams*	New Haven Arena • New Haven, Connecticut	W 4–0	8–8–0
February 18	Cornell*	New Haven Arena • New Haven, Connecticut	W 6–2	9–8–0
February 22	St. Nicholas Hockey Club*	New Haven Arena • New Haven, Connecticut	L 1–3	9–9–0
February 26	Harvard	New Haven Arena • New Haven, Connecticut (Rivalry)	L 1–3	9–10–0 (2–2–0)
*Non-conference game.
