= 1921–22 Army Cadets men's ice hockey season =

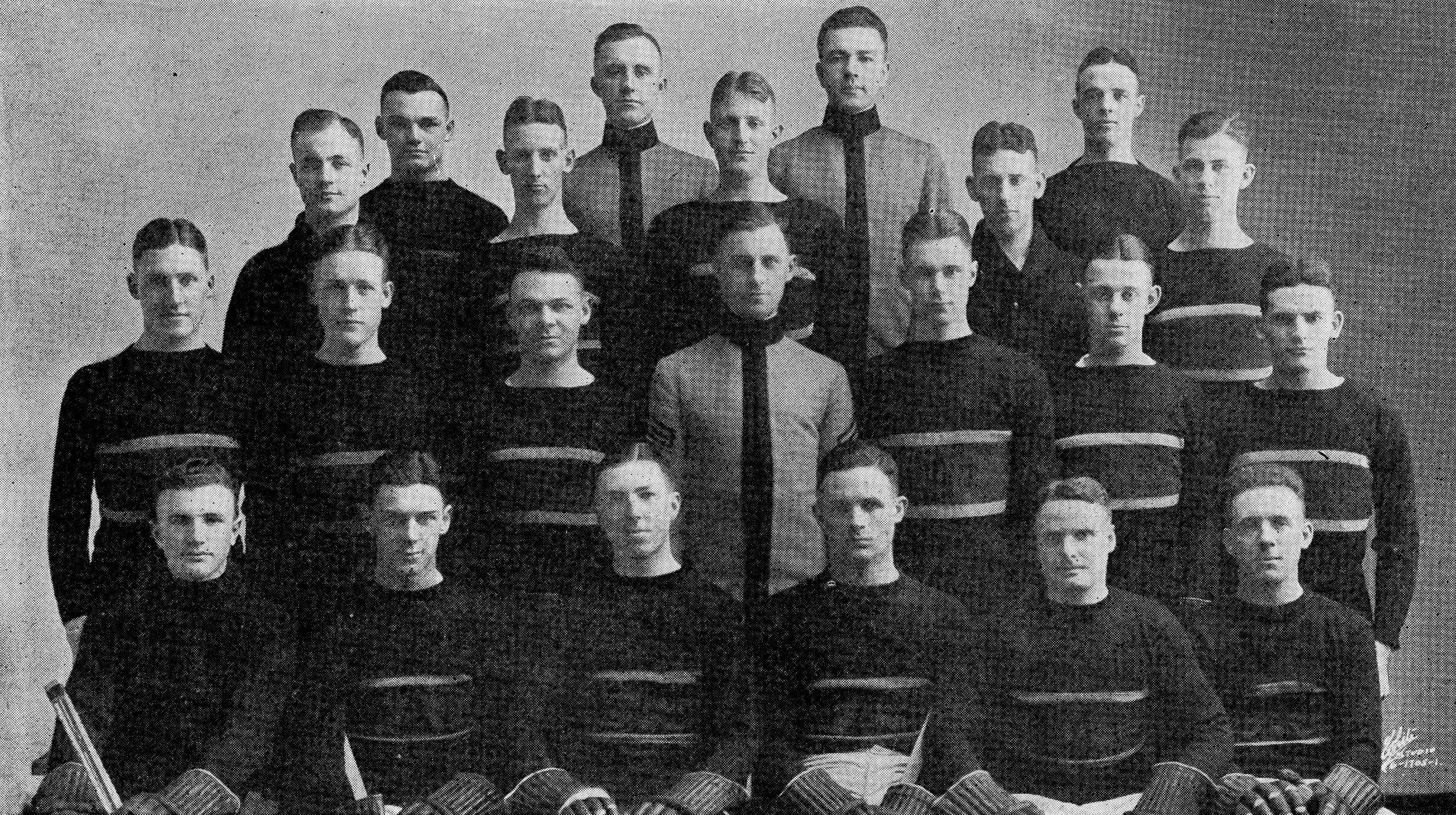
- Conference: Independent
- Home ice: Stuart Rink

Record
- Overall: 5–3–1
- Home: 5–3–1

Coaches and captains
- Head coach: Talbot Hunter
- Captain: James O'Connell

The 1921–22 Army Cadets men's ice hockey season was the 19th season of play for the program. The team was coached by Talbot Hunter in his second season.

== Season ==
After a forgettable season the year before, coach Talbot Hunter received a boon when many men showed up to tryouts, swelling the ranks of the team further than it had even been before. Prospects for a good season were in doubt at the start, when warm weather in December forced the team to practice in the basement of a gymnasium. However, winter soon settled over New York and the team was able to open the season with a solid victory over a team made up primarily of former college players. The Cadets continued playing well when they met Colgate, as their experienced defense kept the opposition from scoring.

Army suffered its first loss to an amateur club from Buffalo but immediately got back on to the positive side of the ledger with a string of consistent play against three colleges. The win over Hamilton was particularly interesting since the Continentals were one of the best teams in the country. The team slipped a bit when the calendar changed to February and MAC broke through the Cadets' defense for four goals. After Dartmouth shut out the Cadets for the first time in over two years, Army recovered in the final game to earn a split with Williams.

Army's record, which included four shutout wins, was one of the best the program had ever posted.

James Whetton served as team manager with John Binns and Francis Graling as his assistants.

== Roster ==
No.	Nat.	Player	Class	Pos	Height	Weight	DoB	Hometown	Previous team
	(United States)	Granger Anderson	Senior				1897-07-09	Detroit, Michigan
	(United States)	George R. Beane	Freshman					Rhode Island
	(United States)	Lindsay P. Caywood	Sophomore				1900-02-19	Pittsburgh, Pennsylvania
	(United States)	Einar B. Gjelsteen	Junior				1900-10-18	Menominee, Michigan
	(United States)	William B. Goddard	Senior	F				Flushing, New York
	(United States)	Melville F. Grant	Senior	F			1900-01-25	Medford, Massachusetts
	(United States)	Alfred E. Kastner	Senior	G			1900-12-14	Chambersburg, Pennsylvania
	(United States)	Royal B. Lord	Junior				1899-09-13	Pawtucket, Rhode Island
	(United States)	Walter C. Marinelli	Sophomore	F				Calumet, Michigan
	(United States)	Paul D. Michelet	Junior	F			1900-04-18	Minneapolis, Minnesota
	(United States)	James D. O'Connell (C)	Senior	D			1899-09-25	Chicago, Illinois
	(United States)	Kevin O'Shea	Junior	F				New York, New York
	(United States)	Clyde K. Rich	Junior	F			1901-11-01	South Pasadena, California
	(United States)	Harry H. Stout Jr.	Senior	D			1900-12-27	Santa Cruz, California
	(United States)	Charles G. Stevenson Jr.	Sophomore	F				Brooklyn, New York
	(United States)	Hoyt S. Vandenberg	Junior	F			1899-01-24	Milwaukee, Wisconsin
	(United States)	Henry R. Westphalinger	Freshman				1903-03-28	Saint Paul, Minnesota
	(United States)	Henry J. Woodbury	Senior	F				Auburn, Maine
	(United States)	Fred J. Woods	Senior	F			1898-03-19	Seneca Falls, New York

== Standings ==
1921–22 Eastern Collegiate ice hockey standings
	Intercollegiate							Overall					
	GP	W	L	T	Pct.	GF	GA	GP	W	L	T	GF	GA
Amherst	10	4	6	0	.400	14	15	10	4	6	0	14	15
Army	7	4	2	1	.643	23	11	9	5	3	1	26	15
Bates	7	3	4	0	.429	17	16	13	8	5	0	44	25
Boston College	3	3	0	0	1.000	16	3	8	4	3	1	23	16
Bowdoin	3	0	2	1	.167	2	4	9	2	6	1	12	18
Clarkson	1	0	1	0	.000	2	12	2	0	2	0	9	20
Colby	4	1	2	1	.375	5	13	7	3	3	1	16	25
Colgate	3	0	3	0	.000	3	14	4	0	4	0	7	24
Columbia	7	3	3	1	.500	21	24	7	3	3	1	21	24
Cornell	5	4	1	0	.800	17	10	5	4	1	0	17	10
Dartmouth	6	4	1	1	.750	10	5	6	4	1	1	10	5
Hamilton	8	7	1	0	.875	45	13	9	7	2	0	51	22
Harvard	6	6	0	0	1.000	33	5	11	8	1	2	51	17
Massachusetts Agricultural	9	5	4	0	.556	16	23	11	6	5	0	20	30
MIT	6	3	3	0	.500	14	18	10	4	6	0	–	–
Pennsylvania	7	2	5	0	.286	16	28	8	3	5	0	23	29
Princeton	7	2	5	0	.286	12	21	10	3	6	1	21	28
Rensselaer	5	0	5	0	.000	2	28	5	0	5	0	2	28
Union	0	0	0	0	–	0	0	6	2	4	0	12	12
Williams	8	3	4	1	.438	27	19	8	3	4	1	27	19
Yale	14	7	7	0	.500	46	39	19	9	10	0	55	54
YMCA College	6	2	4	0	.333	3	21	6	2	4	0	3	21

== Schedule and results ==
Date	Opponent	Site	Result	Record
Regular Season
	Albany Country Club*	Stuart Rink • West Point, New York	W 2–0	1–0–0
January 14	Colgate*	Stuart Rink • West Point, New York	W 3–0	2–0–0
January	St. Nicholas Club*	Stuart Rink • West Point, New York	L 1–4	2–1–0
January 21	Hamilton*	Stuart Rink • West Point, New York	W 3–0	3–1–0
January 25	Bates*	Stuart Rink • West Point, New York	W 4–1	4–1–0
January 28	YMCA College*	Stuart Rink • West Point, New York	W 7–0	5–1–0
February 1	Massachusetts Agricultural*	Stuart Rink • West Point, New York	L 3–4	5–2–0
February 8	Dartmouth*	Stuart Rink • West Point, New York	L 0–3	5–3–0
February 18	Williams*	Stuart Rink • West Point, New York	T 3–3	5–3–1
*Non-conference game.
