= 1921–22 United States collegiate men's ice hockey season =

- Duration: December 1921– March 1922
- East Collegiate champion: Harvard
- West Collegiate champion: Notre Dame

The 1921–22 United States collegiate men's ice hockey season was the 28th season of collegiate ice hockey in the United States.

== Regular season ==
=== Standings ===
1921–22 Eastern Collegiate ice hockey standings
	Intercollegiate							Overall					
	GP	W	L	T	Pct.	GF	GA	GP	W	L	T	GF	GA
Amherst	10	4	6	0	.400	14	15	10	4	6	0	14	15
Army	7	4	2	1	.643	23	11	9	5	3	1	26	15
Bates	7	3	4	0	.429	17	16	13	8	5	0	44	25
Boston College	3	3	0	0	1.000	16	3	8	4	3	1	23	16
Bowdoin	3	0	2	1	.167	2	4	9	2	6	1	12	18
Clarkson	1	0	1	0	.000	2	12	2	0	2	0	9	20
Colby	4	1	2	1	.375	5	13	7	3	3	1	16	25
Colgate	3	0	3	0	.000	3	14	4	0	4	0	7	24
Columbia	7	3	3	1	.500	21	24	7	3	3	1	21	24
Cornell	5	4	1	0	.800	17	10	5	4	1	0	17	10
Dartmouth	6	4	1	1	.750	10	5	6	4	1	1	10	5
Hamilton	8	7	1	0	.875	45	13	9	7	2	0	51	22
Harvard	6	6	0	0	1.000	33	5	11	8	1	2	51	17
Massachusetts Agricultural	9	5	4	0	.556	16	23	11	6	5	0	20	30
MIT	6	3	3	0	.500	14	18	10	4	6	0	–	–
Pennsylvania	7	2	5	0	.286	16	28	8	3	5	0	23	29
Princeton	7	2	5	0	.286	12	21	10	3	6	1	21	28
Rensselaer	5	0	5	0	.000	2	28	5	0	5	0	2	28
Union	0	0	0	0	–	0	0	6	2	4	0	12	12
Williams	8	3	4	1	.438	27	19	8	3	4	1	27	19
Yale	14	7	7	0	.500	46	39	19	9	10	0	55	54
YMCA College	6	2	4	0	.333	3	21	6	2	4	0	3	21

1921–22 Western Collegiate ice hockey standings
	Intercollegiate							Overall					
	GP	W	L	T	Pct.	GF	GA	GP	W	L	T	GF	GA
Michigan Agricultural	2	0	2	0	.000	1	14	4	0	4	0	2	28
Michigan College of Mines	9	6	2	1	.722	22	15	12	8	3	1	33	22
Minnesota	10	6	3	1	.650	35	16	10	6	3	1	35	16
Notre Dame	5	5	0	0	1.000	23	3	11	8	2	1	61	26
Wisconsin	7	0	7	0	.000	7	39	8	0	8	0	8	43

1921–22 Minnesota Intercollegiate Athletic Conference ice hockey standings
	Conference							Overall					
	GP	W	L	T	PTS	GF	GA	GP	W	L	T	GF	GA
Hamline	4	3	1	0	.750	30	5	7	5	2	0	41	12
St. Thomas	4	3	1	0	.750	23	4	8	4	4	0	33	14
Macalester	4	0	4	0	.000	1	45	4	0	4	0	1	45
No Champion Named

1921–22 Triangular Hockey League standings
	Conference								Overall					
	GP	W	L	T	PTS	SW	GF	GA	GP	W	L	T	GF	GA
Harvard *	4	4	0	0	1.000	2	21	3	11	8	1	2	51	17
Yale	4	2	2	0	.500	1	8	12	19	9	10	0	55	54
Princeton	4	0	4	0	.000	0	3	17	10	3	6	1	21	27
* indicates conference champion
