= 1921–22 Dartmouth Indians men's ice hockey season =

- Conference: Independent
- Home ice: Occom Pond

Record
- Overall: 4–1–1
- Home: 1–1–1
- Road: 3–0–0

Coaches and captains
- Head coach: Chippy Gaw
- Captain: William Perry

The 1921–22 Dartmouth Indians men's ice hockey season was the 16th season of play for the program. The Indians were coached by Chippy Gaw in his 1st season.

== Season ==
Dartmouth had every intention of making 1922 one of the best seasons yet for the program, unfortunately, the weather would no cooperate. After opening with two solid victories in the first half of January, the team had to cancel every game over a 3-week period due to a complete lack of ice. By the time the Indians were finally able to get back on the ice, the state of the team was a mystery. To the Green's benefit, their opponent, Yale, was in the midst of an up-and-down season and weren't able to press Dartmouth as they did in years past. The Indian's offense had a bit of trouble getting to their game but the defense was sound. No scoring occurred in the first two periods and the tie was broken by Yale at the start of the third. It onto took Foster a few minutes to get the Greens their first goal and that was soon followed by a second from Osborne. The rapid succession of goals ended abruptly and the defenses took over for the remainder of the match. The win kept Dartmouth's championship hopes alive despite their dearth of games played.

The Indians continued their successful road trip with a win at Army before heading home. By then the weather in Hanover had cooled enough for their rink to be usable and the team welcomed Columbia for the first home game in nearly a month. 1,500 people were in attendance to see the Indian team that might finally deliver an ice hockey championship at the winter carnival. Unfortunately, the game was marred by heavy snowfall that caused drifts to build up along the ice. The game was slowed due to the precipitation and wind but that didn't stop either team from trying their best. The lions nearly got the opening goal after 9 minutes but the score was disallowed due to the Dartmouth net being knocked out of place. The pace slowed further in the second period and with the storm refusing to let up, The referee called a halt to play at the 9-minute mark. Though the tie was hardly a desired outcome from either side, the result and its necessity meant that Dartmouth still had a chance for a title as they entered their final game of the year with 2-time defending champion, Harvard.

In a game that would likely decide the championship (Harvard was also undefeated in intercollegiate play), Dartmouth found itself outmatched by a faster Crimson sextet. The Greens weren't able to contend with the constant pressure from the Harvard offense and were routinely forced to pull back to defend their cage. Though the Indians managed to break up many a passing play, three shouts found their way behind Tobin which more than doubled his goals against for the season. The offense, on the other hand, was at a total loss on how to break through the stout Harvard defense. Hall tried time and again to skate into the Crimson's end but he was quickly set upon by defenders. Even when he tried to pass the puck there always seemed to be a Harvard stick in the way. Dartmouth's offense could find no traction in the game and the team couldn't stop the Crimson from ending their dreams of a championship.

== Roster ==
No.	Nat.	Player	Class	Pos	Height	Weight	DoB	Hometown	Previous team
	(United States)	Raymond P. Atwood	Senior	LW			1900-03-27	Boston, Massachusetts
	(United States)	Charles A. Colder	Junior	LW			1901-05-25	Cleveland, Ohio
	(United States)	Morton W. Fletcher	Junior	RW			1901-08-27	Greenfield, New Hampshire
	(United States)	John E. Foster	Junior	D			1900-06-28	Montclair, New Jersey
	(United States)	Robert B. Hall	Sophomore	D/C	5' 8" (1.73 m)	165 lb (75 kg)	1899-10-13	Oak Park, Illinois	Brooklyn Crescents
	(United States)	James M. Osborne	Junior	RW			1901-05-09	Cleveland, Ohio
	(United States)	David A. Perry	Sophomore	D/C			1902-03-12	Sharon, Massachusetts
	(United States)	William H. Perry (C)	Senior	D/F			1899-09-05	Somerville, Massachusetts
	(United States)	Walter W. Sands	Senior	LW/RW			1900-02-25	Cambridge, Massachusetts
	(United States)	Francis E. Sheehy	Sophomore	C/LW			1902-04-16	Roxbury, Massachusetts
	(United States)	Robert A. Smith	Junior	LW/RW			1902-04-07	Arlington, Massachusetts
	(United States)	Donald J. Tobin	Senior	G			1901-08-03	Syracuse, New York

== Standings ==
1921–22 Eastern Collegiate ice hockey standings
	Intercollegiate							Overall					
	GP	W	L	T	Pct.	GF	GA	GP	W	L	T	GF	GA
Amherst	10	4	6	0	.400	14	15	10	4	6	0	14	15
Army	7	4	2	1	.643	23	11	9	5	3	1	26	15
Bates	7	3	4	0	.429	17	16	13	8	5	0	44	25
Boston College	3	3	0	0	1.000	16	3	8	4	3	1	23	16
Bowdoin	3	0	2	1	.167	2	4	9	2	6	1	12	18
Clarkson	1	0	1	0	.000	2	12	2	0	2	0	9	20
Colby	4	1	2	1	.375	5	13	7	3	3	1	16	25
Colgate	3	0	3	0	.000	3	14	4	0	4	0	7	24
Columbia	7	3	3	1	.500	21	24	7	3	3	1	21	24
Cornell	5	4	1	0	.800	17	10	5	4	1	0	17	10
Dartmouth	6	4	1	1	.750	10	5	6	4	1	1	10	5
Hamilton	8	7	1	0	.875	45	13	9	7	2	0	51	22
Harvard	6	6	0	0	1.000	33	5	11	8	1	2	51	17
Massachusetts Agricultural	9	5	4	0	.556	16	23	11	6	5	0	20	30
MIT	6	3	3	0	.500	14	18	10	4	6	0	–	–
Pennsylvania	7	2	5	0	.286	16	28	8	3	5	0	23	29
Princeton	7	2	5	0	.286	12	21	10	3	6	1	21	28
Rensselaer	5	0	5	0	.000	2	28	5	0	5	0	2	28
Union	0	0	0	0	–	0	0	6	2	4	0	12	12
Williams	8	3	4	1	.438	27	19	8	3	4	1	27	19
Yale	14	7	7	0	.500	46	39	19	9	10	0	55	54
YMCA College	6	2	4	0	.333	3	21	6	2	4	0	3	21

== Schedule and results ==
Date	Opponent	Site	Result	Record
Regular Season
January 8	Amherst*	Occom Pond • Hanover, New Hampshire	W 2–0	1–0–0
January 14	at Massachusetts Agricultural*	Alumni Field Rink • Amherst, Massachusetts	W 3–1	2–0–0
February 6	at Yale*	New Haven Arena • New Haven, Connecticut	W 2–1	3–0–0
February 8	at Army*	Stuart Rink • West Point, New York	W 3–0	4–0–0
February 11	Columbia*	Occom Pond • Hanover, New Hampshire	T 0–0 ^{†}	4–0–1
February 15	Harvard*	Occom Pond • Hanover, New Hampshire	L 0–3 ^{‡}	4–1–1
*Non-conference game.

† The game was stopped after 24 minutes due to a snowstorm.
‡ Some Dartmouth records have the score as 2–3 in Harvard's favor, however, contemporary records list Harvard as the victor 0–3.
