= 1921–22 Cornell Big Red men's ice hockey season =

Intercollegiate hockey season

- Home ice: Beebe Lake

Record
- Overall: 4–1–0
- Home: 4–0–0
- Road: 0–1–0

Coaches and captains
- Head coach: Nick Bawlf
- Captain: George Thornton

The 1921–22 Cornell Big Red men's ice hockey season was the 17th season of play for the program. The teams was coached by Nick Bawlf in his 2nd season.

== Season ==
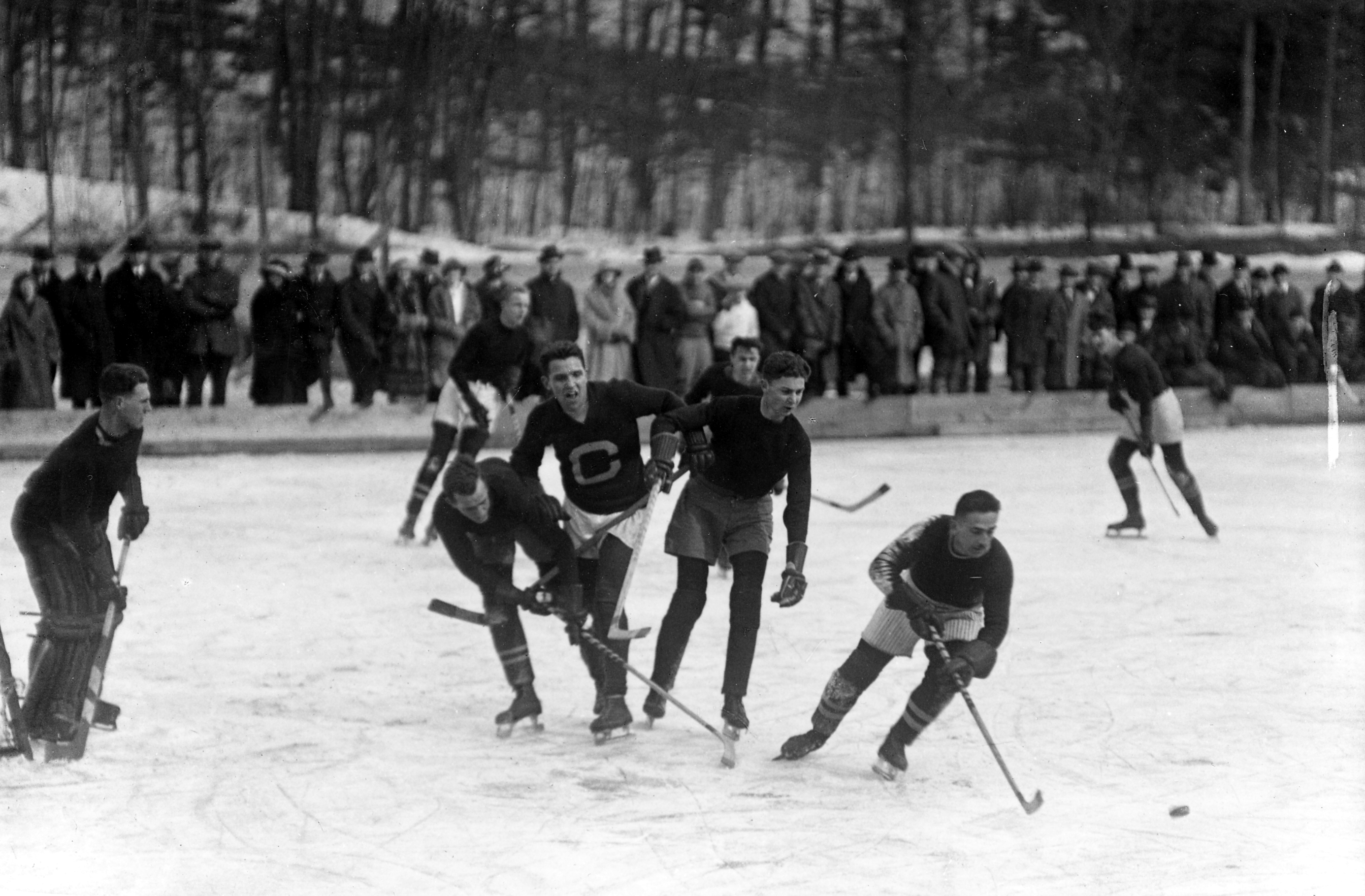
Cornell vs. Amherst, Jan 14

For the second season back, Cornell planned for a 7-game slate (only 5 were played), seeking to return to the upper ranks of college hockey. The team opened with three home wins against smaller schools before hitting the rod to end the season. After their win over Pennsylvania, the team met Yale and hoped to continue their unbeaten streak. Unfortunately, the Big Red were soundly beaten before a crowd of 3,000 on the strength of Joe Bulkley's 5-goal game. The following game with Hamilton was cancelled due to a lack of ice on Beebe Lake.

== Roster ==
No.	Nat.	Player	Class	Pos	Height	Weight	DoB	Hometown	Previous team
	(United States)	John D. Brockway		RW			1898-02-16	Syracuse, New York
	(United States)	Charles Davidson		LW/RW				Sault Ste. Marie, Michigan
	(United States)	Thomas D. Finn	Senior	D				Exeter, New Hampshire
	(United States)	William Goetz		D				Buffalo, New York
	(United States)	Charles L. MacDonald		RW			1902-01-26	Duluth, Minnesota
	(United States)	John Ogden Jr.		D				Ithaca, New York
	(United States)	George H. Thornton (C)	Senior	C				New York, New York
	(United States)	Frank J. Tone Jr.	Sophomore	LW			1901-03-30	Niagara Falls, New York
	(United States)	Stanley Wight		G				Detroit, Michigan

== Standings ==
1921–22 Eastern Collegiate ice hockey standings
	Intercollegiate							Overall					
	GP	W	L	T	Pct.	GF	GA	GP	W	L	T	GF	GA
Amherst	10	4	6	0	.400	14	15	10	4	6	0	14	15
Army	7	4	2	1	.643	23	11	9	5	3	1	26	15
Bates	7	3	4	0	.429	17	16	13	8	5	0	44	25
Boston College	3	3	0	0	1.000	16	3	8	4	3	1	23	16
Bowdoin	3	0	2	1	.167	2	4	9	2	6	1	12	18
Clarkson	1	0	1	0	.000	2	12	2	0	2	0	9	20
Colby	4	1	2	1	.375	5	13	7	3	3	1	16	25
Colgate	3	0	3	0	.000	3	14	4	0	4	0	7	24
Columbia	7	3	3	1	.500	21	24	7	3	3	1	21	24
Cornell	5	4	1	0	.800	17	10	5	4	1	0	17	10
Dartmouth	6	4	1	1	.750	10	5	6	4	1	1	10	5
Hamilton	8	7	1	0	.875	45	13	9	7	2	0	51	22
Harvard	6	6	0	0	1.000	33	5	11	8	1	2	51	17
Massachusetts Agricultural	9	5	4	0	.556	16	23	11	6	5	0	20	30
MIT	6	3	3	0	.500	14	18	10	4	6	0	–	–
Pennsylvania	7	2	5	0	.286	16	28	8	3	5	0	23	29
Princeton	7	2	5	0	.286	12	21	10	3	6	1	21	28
Rensselaer	5	0	5	0	.000	2	28	5	0	5	0	2	28
Union	0	0	0	0	–	0	0	6	2	4	0	12	12
Williams	8	3	4	1	.438	27	19	8	3	4	1	27	19
Yale	14	7	7	0	.500	46	39	19	9	10	0	55	54
YMCA College	6	2	4	0	.333	3	21	6	2	4	0	3	21

== Schedule and results ==
Date	Opponent	Site	Result	Record
Regular season
January 14	Amherst*	Beebe Lake • Ithaca, New York	W 4–0	1–0–0
January 21	Colgate*	Beebe Lake • Ithaca, New York	W 3–2	2–0–0
January 27	Massachusetts Agricultural*	Beebe Lake • Ithaca, New York	W 4–0 ^{†}	3–0–0
February 11	Pennsylvania*	Beebe Lake • Ithaca, New York	W 4–2	4–0–0
February 18	at Yale*	New Haven Arena • New Haven, Connecticut	L 2–6	4–1–0
*Non-conference game.

† UMass records the game as being played on January 27 with the score 4–1 for Cornell.
