= 1921–22 Williams Ephs men's ice hockey season =

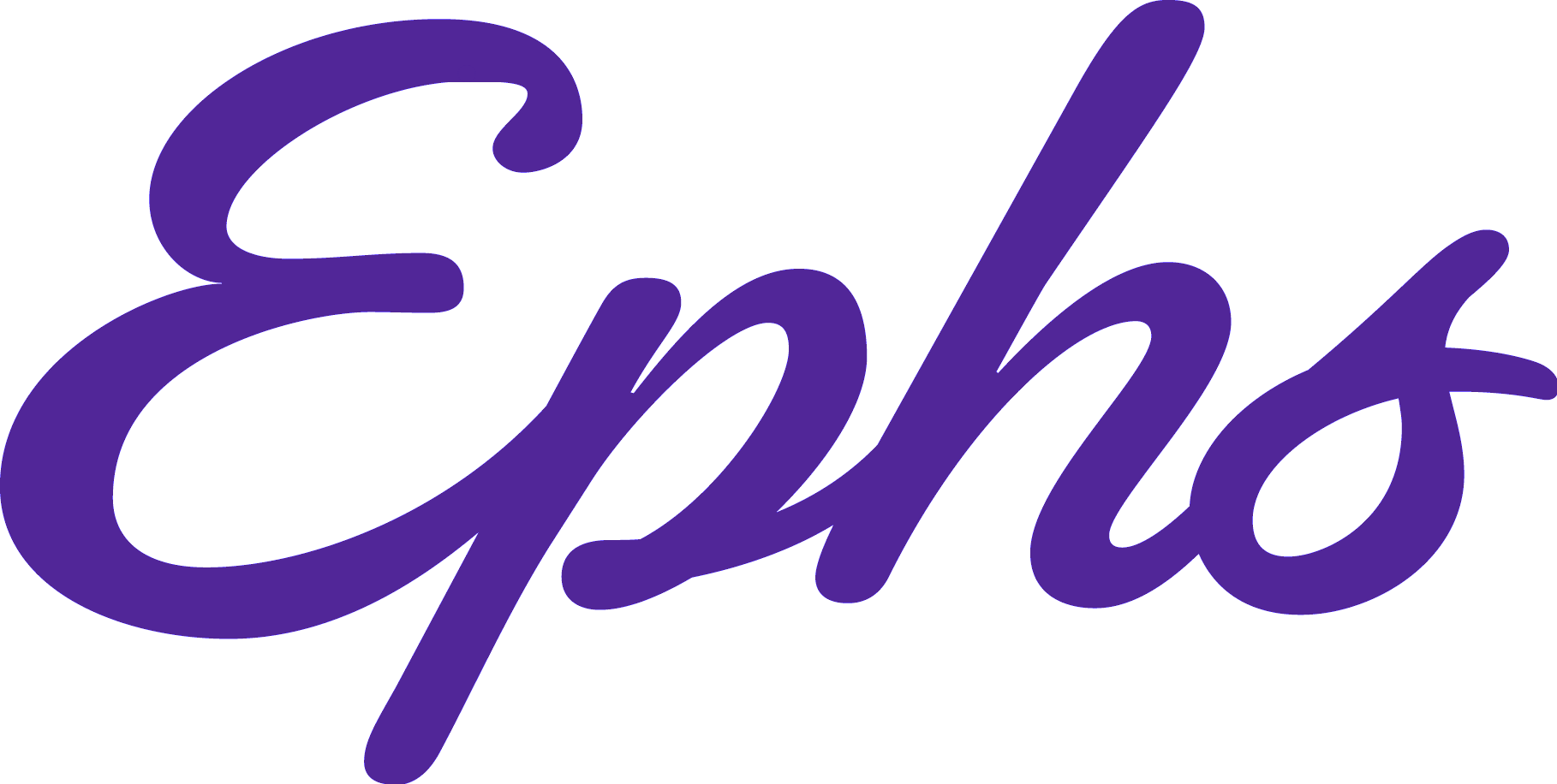
- Conference: Independent
- Home ice: Cole Field House Rink

Record
- Overall: 3–4–1
- Home: 3–1–0
- Road: 0–3–1

Coaches and captains
- Captain: Alan Becket

The 1921–22 Williams Ephs men's ice hockey season was the 19th season of play for the program.

== Season ==
After a very successful season in '21, Williams came into the year with high hopes. With most of the team returning, the Ephs had a good foundation for success. With only defenseman Dudley Irwin departing due to graduation, the team that had nearly gone undefeated was hoping for even better results. While the faces weren't very different, the team would have to adjust to the new style as Williams had joined with most other college programs and formally dropped the rover position. They had played five of their six games the year before with a 7-man team but the rising trend in the sport was irresistible and the Ephs would play 6-man hockey forevermore. While that alteration to the team would have an unknown effect on their season, the change in temperature was far more predictable. After having to deal with a lack of ice all year, the team welcomed an early chill and managed to get some outdoor practice on Leake's Pond while they waited for the Cole Field House Rink to be ready. Williams scheduled eight games at the start with the possibility of adding another before season's end. As the players were getting ready to head home for the winter break, however, the weather warmed up and forced the off the ice.

Williams returned after the Christmas holiday and got to work for their opening match with Rensselaer. Luckily, the temperature had dropped in the interim and the game was able to take place on the Cole Field House Rink. The ice was not in the best condition, being a bit soft and overused from practice, but that didn't stop the Ephs from trouncing the Engineers 9–1. Team captain Becket, who had dropped back to defense to fill in for the departed Dudley Irwin, led the way with 4 goals. Four of his teammates joining in on the fun while several alternates were used throughout the game. A week later the team had a near-repeat performance when they stomped on YMCA College. Despite a slow start, the entire starting lineup got into the scoring action with only Wallace Richmond, the goaltender, failing to score a goal.

While Williams was riding high after two dominate performances, their schedule put them on the sidelines for two and half weeks. Unfortunately, during that break, the team lost the services of Richmond to an illness and would need a new netminder. Another more common problem also cropped up when the weather warmed and two games had to be cancelled. The match with the Albany Country Club was completely scrapped while the contest against Amherst was postponed. When the Ephs were finally able to hold the match a week late, the team was visibly weaker than they had been in January. Lowes, who took over in Richmond's absence, played a strong game in goal but regular center William Stephenson had injured a tendon in his leg and was unable to play. His younger brother, John, subbed in but the offense wasn't quite the same.

Williams travelled to Amherst for the rematch and to kick off a road trip that went badly for the Purple. Amherst was able exact revenge from the Ephs with a close victory, handing Williams its first loss of the season. The next night the team was in Connecticut facing Yale and were unable to manage a single goal. Despite the elder Stephenson's return to the lineup, the Bulldog defense was just to strong for Williams to overcome. The superior teamwork and depth left the Ephs in the dust and ended any pretentions the team may have had for the season. The team recovered slightly on their swing west to play Army with a tie, but the Ephs were still hamstring by injury and illness.

Warm weather reared its ugly head once more and forced the next game to be played on Leake's Pond. Nickle, the opposing goaltender was continually penalized for kneeling in the crease, a violation of the then-rule that goaltenders were required to stay on the skates. His illegal ploy worked, however, and he stopped several otherwise sure goals from Purple sticks. Lowes, meanwhile, played a good game but surrendered a pair to drop the team down to .500. The final game came a week later when the team traveled to New York City to take on Columbia. Williams started off in good order, jumping out to a 3–1 lead after the first. Unfortunately, the team flagged in the later portion of the game and allowed 4 unanswered goals to the Lions to lose their last game of the season.

Donald Cruse served as team manager with Alfred C. Mosher as his assistant.

== Roster ==
No.	Nat.	Player	Class	Pos	Height	Weight	DoB	Hometown	Previous team
	(United States)	Alan L. Becket (C)	Senior	D				East Orange, New Jersey
	(United States)	Trescott A. Buell	Senior	D				Pittsfield, Massachusetts
	(United States)	Russell C. Clark	Junior	C/LW			1900-03-23	New Brighton, New York
	(United States)	Wilson S. Crosby	Junior	D				Edgartown, Massachusetts
	(United States)	George T. Dewey Jr.	Senior	D/C			1900-04-21	Worcester, Massachusetts
	(United States)	Meredith Hemphill	Junior	LW/RW			1902-03-05	New York, New York
	(United States)	Marvin M. Lowes	Sophomore	G			1903-06-12	Flushing, New York
	(United States)	Sherwood T. Peckham	Junior	D				New Rochelle, New York
	(United States)	Phelps Phelps	Senior	G			1897-05-04	New York, New York
	(United States)	Reginald W. Pressprich Jr.	Sophomore	C/LW			1902-08-05	Rochester, New York
	(United States)	Wallace E. Richmond Jr.	Junior	G			1901-09-18	Newtonville, Massachusetts
	(United States)	Richard E. Rowse	Senior	RW			1898-05-07	Lexington, Massachusetts
	(United States)	John A. Stephenson Jr.	Sophomore	C/LW			1902-03-20	Duluth, Minnesota
	(United States)	William R. Stephenson	Junior	D/F			1900-05-27	Duluth, Minnesota

== Standings ==
1921–22 Eastern Collegiate ice hockey standings
	Intercollegiate							Overall					
	GP	W	L	T	Pct.	GF	GA	GP	W	L	T	GF	GA
Amherst	10	4	6	0	.400	14	15	10	4	6	0	14	15
Army	7	4	2	1	.643	23	11	9	5	3	1	26	15
Bates	7	3	4	0	.429	17	16	13	8	5	0	44	25
Boston College	3	3	0	0	1.000	16	3	8	4	3	1	23	16
Bowdoin	3	0	2	1	.167	2	4	9	2	6	1	12	18
Clarkson	1	0	1	0	.000	2	12	2	0	2	0	9	20
Colby	4	1	2	1	.375	5	13	7	3	3	1	16	25
Colgate	3	0	3	0	.000	3	14	4	0	4	0	7	24
Columbia	7	3	3	1	.500	21	24	7	3	3	1	21	24
Cornell	5	4	1	0	.800	17	10	5	4	1	0	17	10
Dartmouth	6	4	1	1	.750	10	5	6	4	1	1	10	5
Hamilton	8	7	1	0	.875	45	13	9	7	2	0	51	22
Harvard	6	6	0	0	1.000	33	5	11	8	1	2	51	17
Massachusetts Agricultural	9	5	4	0	.556	16	23	11	6	5	0	20	30
MIT	6	3	3	0	.500	14	18	10	4	6	0	–	–
Pennsylvania	7	2	5	0	.286	16	28	8	3	5	0	23	29
Princeton	7	2	5	0	.286	12	21	10	3	6	1	21	28
Rensselaer	5	0	5	0	.000	2	28	5	0	5	0	2	28
Union	0	0	0	0	–	0	0	6	2	4	0	12	12
Williams	8	3	4	1	.438	27	19	8	3	4	1	27	19
Yale	14	7	7	0	.500	46	39	19	9	10	0	55	54
YMCA College	6	2	4	0	.333	3	21	6	2	4	0	3	21

== Schedule and results ==
Date	Opponent	Site	Decision	Result	Record
Regular Season
January 7	Rensselaer*	Cole Field House Rink • Williamstown, Massachusetts	Richmond	W 9–1	1–0–0
January 14	YMCA College*	Cole Field House Rink • Williamstown, Massachusetts	Richmond	W 8–1	2–0–0
February 9	Amherst*	Cole Field House Rink • Williamstown, Massachusetts	Lowes	W 2–0	3–0–0
February 14	at Amherst*	Pratt Field Rink • Amherst, Massachusetts	Lowes	L 2–3	3–1–0
February 15	at Yale*	New Haven Arena • New Haven, Connecticut	Lowes	L 0–4	3–2–0
February 18	at Army*	Stuart Rink • West Point, New York	Lowes	T 3–3 ^{2OT}	3–2–1
February 26	MIT*	Leake's Pond • Williamstown, Massachusetts	Lowes	L 0–2	3–3–1
March 4	at Columbia*	181st Street Ice Palace • New York, New York	Lowes	L 3–5	3–4–1
*Non-conference game.

== Scoring statistics ==
Name	Position	Games	Goals
Richard Rowse	RW	7	5
William Stephenson	D/C/RW	7	5
Alan Becket	D	8	5
Russell Clark	C/LW	8	5
Meredith Hemphill	LW/RW	6	2
John Stephenson	C/LW	6	2
Trescott Buell	D	8	2
Reginald Pressprich	C/LW	5	1
Wilson Crosby	D	1	0
Sherwood Peckham	D	1	0
Phelps Phelps	G	1	0
Wallace Richmond	G	2	0
George Dewey	D/C	4	0
Marvin Lowes	G	6	0
Total			27

== Goaltending statistics ==
Name	Games	Minutes	Wins	Losses	Ties	Goals Against	Saves	Shut Outs	SV %	GAA
Phelps Phelps	1	15	0	0	0	0		0		0.00
Wallace Richmond	2	75	2	0	0	2		0		1.20
Marvin Lowes	6	293	1	4	1	17		1		2.61
Total	8	383	3	4	1	19		1		2.23

Note: goals against average is based upon a 45-minute regulation game.
