= Russell Sage Rink =

Indoor, artificial ice rink

- Interactive map of Russell Sage Rink
- Location: 198 College Hill Road; Clinton, New York, 13323
- Coordinates: 43°03′13″N 75°24′28″W
- Owner: Hamilton College
- Capacity: 600
- Surface: 210' x 85' (hockey)

Construction
- Opened: 1921

Tenants
- Hamilton Continentals (1921–Present); Clinton Comets (??–1949)

The Russell Sage Rink in Clinton, New York, is an indoor, artificial ice rink owned and operated by Hamilton College. The venue was the first on-campus rink built in the United States, predating the Hobey Baker Memorial Rink by a year.

== History ==
Hamilton founded its ice hockey team shortly after the end of World War I. After just two seasons, head coach Albert I. Prettyman convinced the school to allow a permanent indoor rink to be built. A donation from the Russell Sage Foundation was used to fund the project and, in honor of the gift, the new arena was named the 'Russell Sage Rink'. The building allowed Hamilton to both practice and play on a consistent ice surface years before most other teams had access to similar facilities. This helped the Continentals flourish throughout the 20's and 30's.

In the decades since its completion, Hamilton continued to use Sage Rink as its home and the arena was renovated in 1993. The rink is a non-standard size, being 10 feet longer than the typical 200' x 85' dimensions.
