= Super Chief =

Named passenger train of the Santa Fe Railway

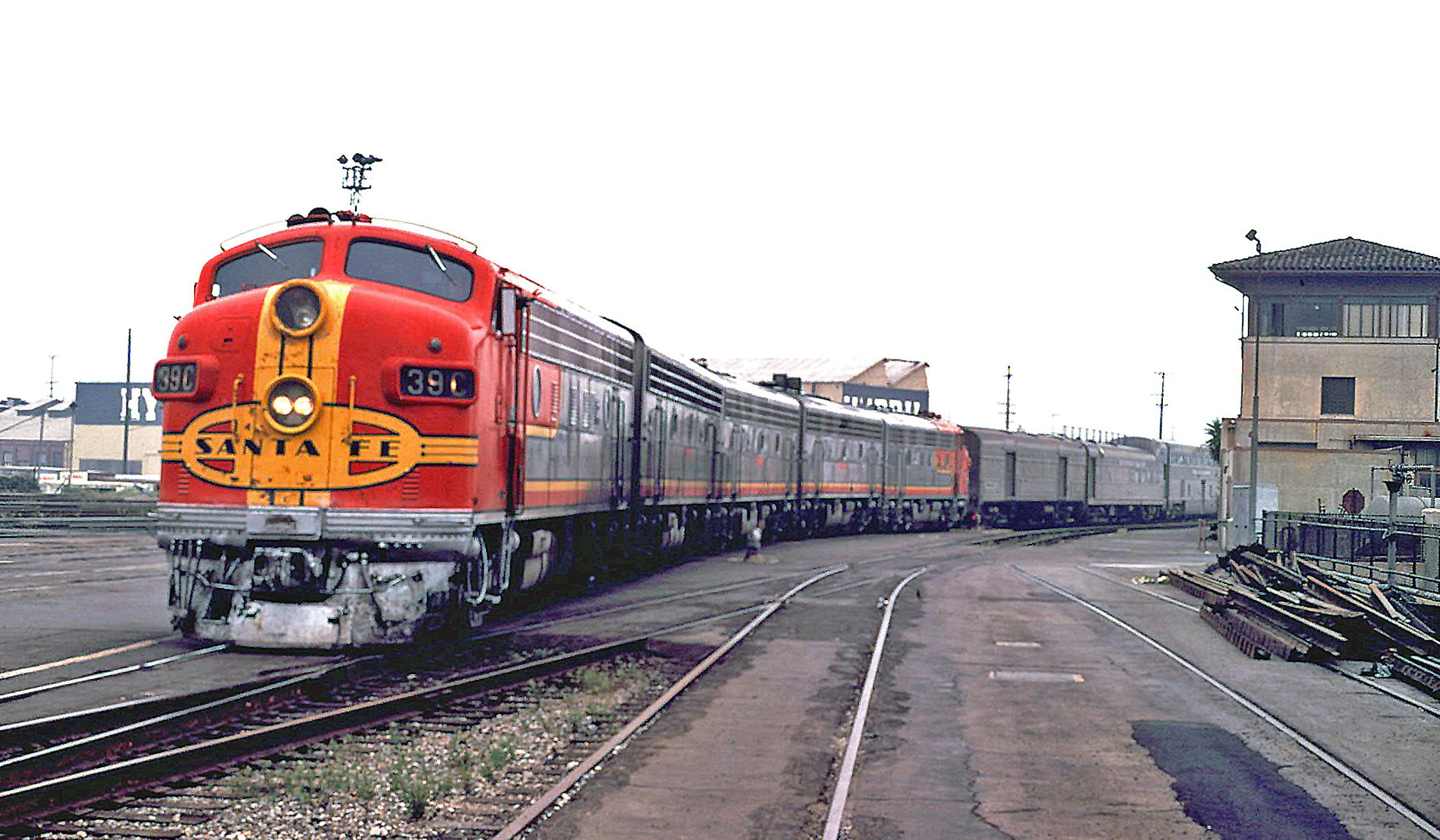
- The Super Chief in March 1971 at Los Angeles

Overview
- Service type: Inter-city rail
- Status: Discontinued
- Locale: Midwestern and Southwestern United States
- First service: May 18, 1937
- Last service: May 19, 1974
- Successor: Southwest Chief
- Former operators: Santa Fe; Amtrak (1971–1974)

Route
- Termini: Chicago; Los Angeles
- Average journey time: 39 hrs 30 min
- Service frequency: Daily (after 1948)
- Train numbers: 17 and 18
- Line used: Southern Transcon

Technical
- Track gauge: 4 ft 8 1/2 in (1,435 mm) standard gauge

The Super Chief was one of the named passenger trains and the flagship of the Atchison, Topeka and Santa Fe Railway. The then-modern streamliner was touted in its heyday as "The Train of the Stars" because it often carried celebrities between Chicago, Illinois, and Los Angeles, California.

The Super Chief (Nos. 17 and 18) was the first diesel-electric powered cross-country passenger train in America. The train eclipsed the Chief as Santa Fe's standard bearer. The extra-fare ($10) Super Chief left Dearborn Station in Chicago for its first trip on May 12, 1936. Before starting scheduled service in May 1937, the lightweight version of the Super Chief ran 2,227 miles (3,584 km) from Los Angeles over recently upgraded tracks in 36 hours and 49 minutes, averaging 60 mph (97 km/h) overall and reaching 100 mph (160 km/h).

With one set of equipment, the train initially operated once a week from both Chicago and Los Angeles. After more passenger cars were delivered in 1938, the Super Chief ran twice weekly that year, and later (from 1948) trips were again increased, to offer daily service. Adding to the train's mystique were its gourmet meals and Hollywood clientele.

Competitors to the Super Chief were the City of Los Angeles trains on the Chicago and North Western Railway and the Union Pacific Railroad, and (to a lesser extent) the Golden State on the Rock Island and Southern Pacific lines. The Santa Fe Super Chief was one of the last passenger trains in the United States to carry an all-Pullman consist; only the Pennsylvania Railroad's Broadway Limited and the Illinois Central's Panama Limited outlasted it. The Super Chief maintained its high level of service until Santa Fe ceased all passenger operations on May 1, 1971.

When Amtrak took over operation of the nation's passenger rail service on May 1, 1971, it retained the Super Chief. In 1974, due to a publicly perceived decline in quality of passenger service, the Santa Fe Railway withdrew permission to use the "Chief" trade name, so Amtrak renamed the train the Southwest Limited. In 1984, after new Superliner equipment had replaced the aging original rolling stock, Santa Fe allowed Amtrak to rename its train to the Southwest Chief.

== Route ==
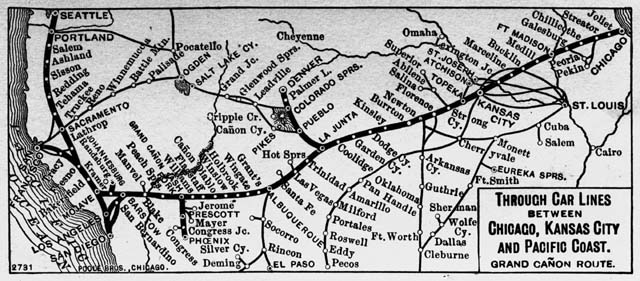
A map depicting the "Grand Canyon Route" of the Atchison, Topeka & Santa Fe Railway c. 1901.

Santa Fe's marketing advantage for the Super Chief lay in the geography of the route as well as its ownership. The Santa Fe began as a rail line along the old Santa Fe and Spanish Trails, from the confluence of the Missouri and Kansas rivers (at Atchison and Topeka, Kansas) to the Pecos River and Rio Grande in New Mexico. This initial route was eventually extended to Los Angeles.

The convenience of traveling "Santa Fe All the Way" was superior to anything that the competing jointly operated railroads could provide on their routes to the west coast. A single traffic and operating department managed all the divisions and districts of the Santa Fe route from Chicago to Los Angeles. Dining cars, the commissary supply chains, the on-board service crews and their management; all worked together from Chicago to Los Angeles.

The Super Chief ran through Kansas City, Missouri; Newton, Kansas; Dodge City, Kansas; La Junta, Colorado; Raton, New Mexico; Las Vegas, New Mexico; Albuquerque, New Mexico; Gallup, New Mexico; Winslow, Arizona; Seligman, Arizona; Needles, California; Barstow, California; San Bernardino, California; and Pasadena, California. During the pre-war years the Super Chief did not allow passengers to board or disembark at any point between Kansas City and Barstow; intermediate stops were operating stops only, to change crews or to service the train. During the war the rules were relaxed to carry passengers to and from Albuquerque and La Junta, but only when unsold space was available at train time. Not until the postwar era could passengers travel to intermediate stations on the Super Chief.

== History ==
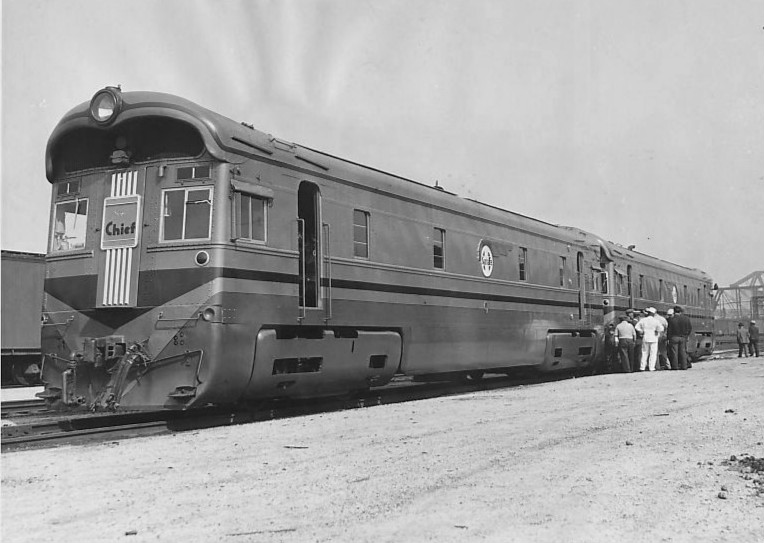
The EMC Nos. 1 and 1A photographed on August 31, 1935.

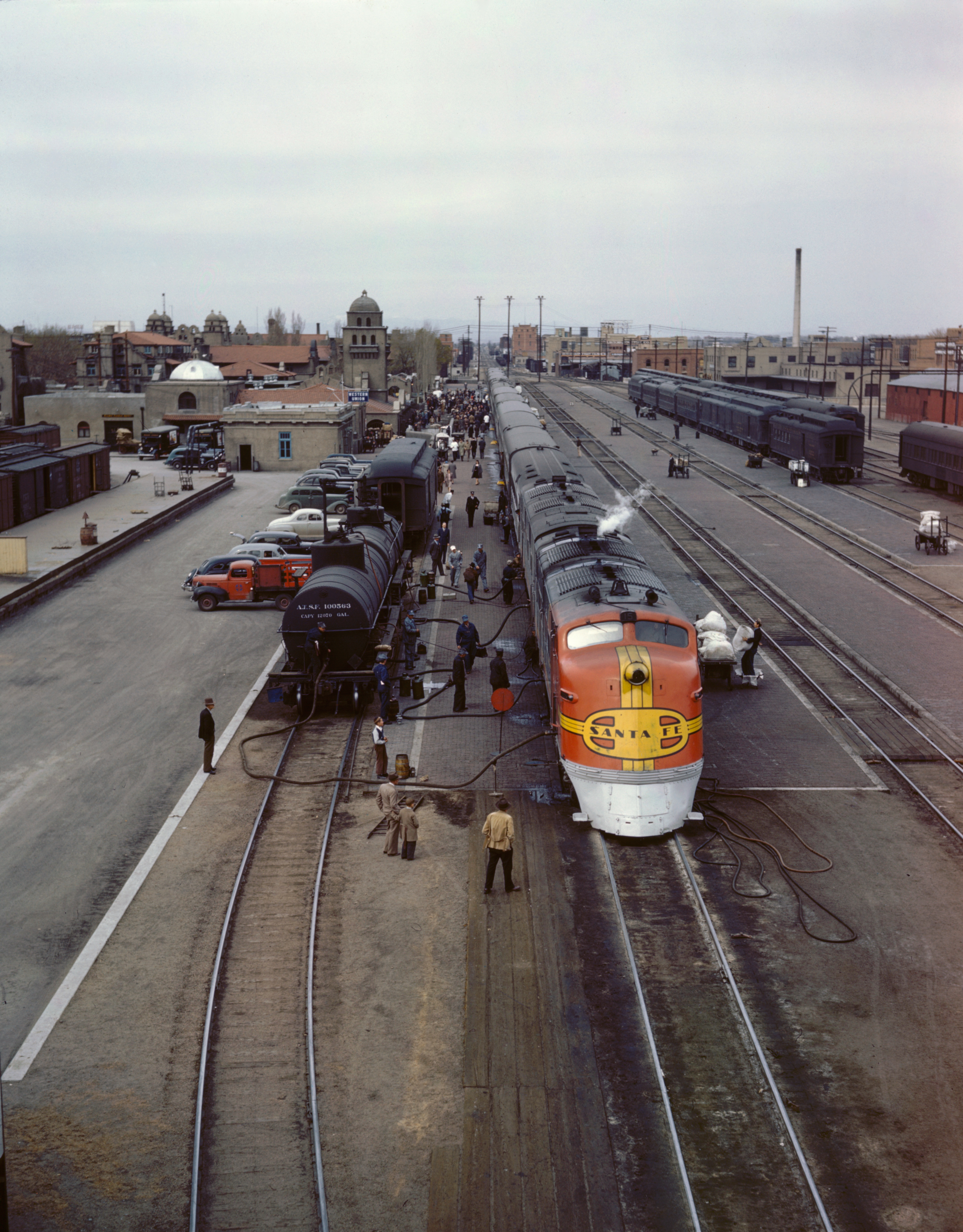
Super Chief being serviced at Albuquerque, New Mexico, in March 1943. A headlight "blackout shield" was a wartime Civil Defense requirement on trains running to the Pacific Coast.

The Santa Fe intended the Super Chief to be the latest in a long line of luxury Chicago–Los Angeles trains wedded to the latest in railroad technology. In the 1930s, these included air conditioning, lightweight all-metal construction, and diesel locomotion. In August 1935, the General Motors Electro-Motive Corporation (EMC) delivered two blunt-nosed diesel-electric units Nos. 1 and 1A, intended to pull the Super Chief. Aside from an ALCO HH600 switcher at Dearborn Station in Chicago, they were the Santa Fe's first diesel-electrics and the first such trains intended for passenger service. The locomotives made their first test run with a set of Pullman cars and a dynamometer car in September 1935. The first Super Chief operated on May 12, 1936, with the diesels pulling air-conditioned heavyweight Pullman cars. They were put into regular service on May 18, 1937.

In 1937, Santa Fe purchased several of Electro-Motive's new "Streamliner Series" diesel-electric locomotives and placed them in service on the Super Chief line. These locomotives were the first to wear Santa Fe's red, yellow, and silver "War bonnet" color scheme. EMC's sleek and efficient streamlined locomotives became the standard on North American railroads. Hollywood celebrities frequently rode the fashionable Super Chief, making it known as "The Train of The Stars".

=== Transcontinental sleeping cars ===
By January 1954, the Super Chief had inherited from the Santa Fe's Chief the service of running continuous Los Angeles-New York sleeping cars continuing from Chicago on the New York Central Railroad's 20th Century Limited and on the Pennsylvania Railroad's Broadway Limited. The Baltimore and Ohio Railroad offered a similar service with Los Angeles-Washington, D.C., sleepers on that company's Shenandoah westbound and Capitol Limited eastbound. However, in October 1957 the PRR dropped its Broadway Limited sleeper connection. Upon the April 1958 timetables, the cooperating railroads terminated their transcontinental sleeper operations. Declining ridership and delay from switching sleeping cars between Chicago terminals were factors in the through-car termination.

=== Timeline ===
- May 10, 1937: The last of four "preview" runs of the Super Chief-2, with an improved 3,600 hp (2.7 MW), two-unit, streamlined diesel locomotive set built by Electro Motive Corporation (EMC), concludes as the train pulls into Los Angeles. All heavyweight cars used on the Super Chief are replaced with lightweight stainless-steel cars. The public is invited to tour the new train at Santa Fe's La Grande Station on May 11 and 12.
- May 15, 1937: The Super Chief departs Los Angeles at 7:30 p.m. PST. The train reaches Chicago in 36 hours and 49 minutes, setting a record. Both new E1 units suffered mechanical damage during the trip and were taken out of service for repairs.
- May 18, 1937: The lightweight Super Chief starts its first regular run, led by Unit 1A and EMC demonstrator Unit 512 (a.k.a. AT&SF Unit 1C) from Chicago's Dearborn Station. The passenger list includes ventriloquist Edgar Bergen and his "sidekick" Charlie McCarthy. (The first pair of E1s were delivered in June.)
- June 15, 1937: The Super Chief makes its first regular run with EMC E1s 2A and 2B, the first locomotives to wear the famous red, yellow and silver "Warbonnet" scheme.
- January 1938: E1 Units 3 and 3A are placed in service on the Super Chief.
- February 26, 1938: Due to production delays, a "borrowed" six-car Chief consist begins running as the Super Chief to allow twice-weekly trips.
- July 2, 1938: Lightweight cars built by Pullman-Standard replace the Chief cars. Until 1946 each trainset makes a weekly round trip between Chicago and Los Angeles, averaging 636 miles (1,024 km) per day.
- 1941: The Santa Fe takes delivery of its only 2,000 hp (1.5 MW) ALCO DL-107/108 model locomotives, units 50 and 50A.
- July 7, 1942: The Super Chief goes on a wartime schedule of 41 hours, 45 minutes. Consist expands to 12 cars.
- June 2, 1946: The train reverts to its prewar schedule of 39 hours and 45 minutes.
- September 29, 1946: Super Chief begins running every other day, departing Los Angeles and Chicago on even-numbered days. With the El Capitan departing on odd-numbered days (except the 31st), the two trains form what the Santa Fe bills as "the first and only daily 39 3/4 hour service between Chicago and California."
- February 29, 1948: AT&SF receives its first post-War order from Pullman-Standard and places these into service on the Super Chief. The railroad now has five Super Chief trainsets, enough to operate daily.
- December 29, 1949: Train No. 17, led by locomotive set #37L/A/B/C, collides with a tanker truck in Azusa, California. All four locomotives, baggage car #3409, and railway post office #88 are damaged by fire.
- 1950–1951: The Super Chief is reequipped with new streamlined sleeping cars built by the Budd Company and the American Car and Foundry Company (ACF), and dining cars from Pullman-Standard. Santa Fe also adds the Pullman-built "Pleasure Dome"-Lounge car (one of the most luxurious ever made for any train) to its Super Chief consists, billing it as the "...only dome car between Chicago and Los Angeles." A speedometer in the front of the car showed the train's velocity.
- June 1952: The Super Chief is featured in the Warner Bros. film Three for Bedroom "C" starring Gloria Swanson.
- 1954: The General Tire and Rubber Company uses the Super Chief as the centerpiece of a print advertisement for its new "Nygen Cord" tire, in which the train is towed by an AT&SF switcher using one of the tires as a connecting link.
- January 10, 1954: The $15.00 extra-fare is reduced to $7.50; the barbershop and shower-bath are discontinued. The Super Chief begins rolling the coast-to-coast Pullmans (which go through to New York City on the Pennsylvania Railroad's Broadway Limited or the New York Central's 20th Century Limited route; east from Washington, it runs on the Shenandoah line westbound to Washington it runs on the Capitol Limited) route; transcontinental sleepers had formerly been carried by the Chief.
- 1956: Round-back observation cars are removed from the Super Chief, converted to blunt-back cars at Pullman's Calumet, Illinois shops and are returned to train Nos. 17 and 18. In early 1958 they are permanently removed from service.
- October 1957: The Pennsylvania Railroad discontinues its sleeping car connection.
- January 12, 1958: The Super Chief and El Capitan are combined during the off-peak season on a 39 1/2-hour schedule.
- April 1958: The continuous Los Angeles-east coast sleeper carriages in cooperation with the New York Central and Baltimore and Ohio are terminated.
- 1958: The five Super Chief trainsets are refurbished and redecorated.

On May 1, 1971, Amtrak took over operation of intercity passenger rail service in the United States. Amtrak retained the Super Chief/El Capitan names with Santa Fe's permission. From June 11 to September 10, 1972, Amtrak operated the Chief, a second Chicago–Los Angeles train along the same route. This was the only occasion on which Amtrak ran a second train to duplicate a long-distance service along its entire route outside the New York–Florida corridor. Amtrak dropped the El Capitan designation on April 19, 1973. On March 7, 1974, the Santa Fe directed Amtrak to stop using the Super Chief and Texas Chief names due to a perceived reduction in the quality of service. The trains were renamed Southwest Limited and Lone Star on May 19. On November 30, 1980, Amtrak replaced the ex-Super Chief "Pleasure Dome" and "Hi-Level" cars on the Southwest Limited with new Superliners.

== Equipment used ==
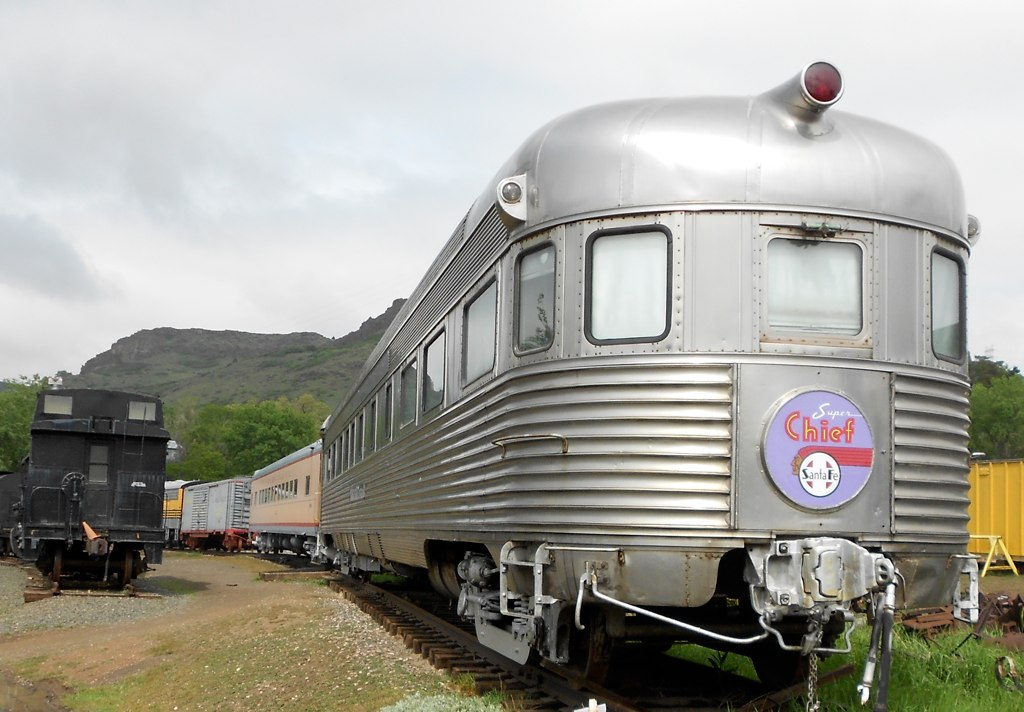
Sleeper-lounge-observation Navajo at the Colorado Railroad Museum in 2012. Note the Super Chief drumhead sign mounted on its rear.

The first motive power set on Super Chief-1 consisted of a pair of blunt-nosed, Diesel-electric units (EMC 1800 hp B-B) designated as Nos. 1 and 1A. Santa Fe employees hung the nicknames "One-Spot Twins" and "Amos 'n' Andy" (from the popular radio show of the day) on the units, which were always paired and ran back-to-back. In a little over a year the EMC E1, a new 3,600 hp (2.7 MW) streamlined Diesel-electric set (one 1800 hp hood unit and the other a cab-less booster unit, also 1800 hp) would be pulling the Super Chief.

A variety of locomotives (including ALCO PAs, EMD E6s, FTs, F3s, F7s, and FP45s, along with Santa Fe's only ALCO DL-107/108s and FM Erie-built units) would make their appearances over the years. All wore the Warbonnet paint scheme devised by Leland Knickerbocker of the GM "Art and Color Section" that debuted on the Super Chief-2. Steam locomotives including No. 3751 and 2926 were not uncommon for relief power in the event of the diesels experiencing problems or being unavailable.

== Station stops ==
1938

- Chicago, Illinois (Dearborn Station)
- Kansas City, Missouri
- Newton, Kansas (service only)
- Dodge City, Kansas (service only)
- La Junta, Colorado (service only)
- Raton, New Mexico (service only)
- Las Vegas, New Mexico (service only)
- Albuquerque, New Mexico (service only)
- Gallup, New Mexico (service only)
- Winslow, Arizona (service only)
- Seligman, Arizona (service only)
- Needles, California (service only)
- Barstow, California
- San Bernardino, California
- Pasadena, California
- Los Angeles, California

1956

- Chicago, Illinois (Dearborn Station)
- Joliet, Illinois
- Streator, Illinois
- Chillicothe, Illinois
- Galesburg, Illinois
- Fort Madison, Iowa
- Shopton, Iowa
- Kansas City, Missouri
- Newton, Kansas
- Hutchinson, Kansas
- Dodge City, Kansas
- La Junta, Colorado
- Raton, New Mexico
- Las Vegas, New Mexico
- Lamy, New Mexico
- Albuquerque, New Mexico
- Gallup, New Mexico
- Winslow, Arizona
- Flagstaff, Arizona
- Seligman, Arizona
- Needles, California
- Barstow, California
- San Bernardino, California
- Pomona, California
- Pasadena, California
- Los Angeles, California

== "Hollywood mystique" ==
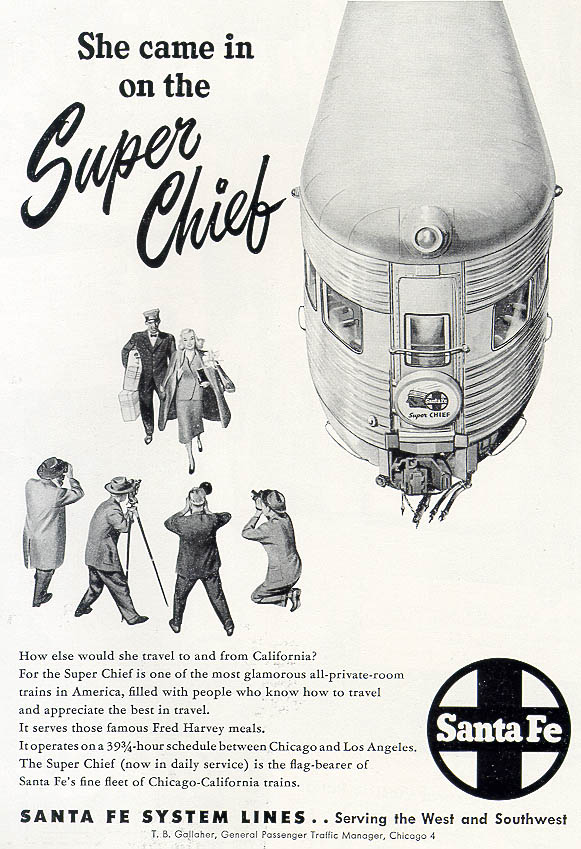
Ad describing the Super Chief features

The Super Chief has been characterized as a near-instant success among travelers who appreciated its modern, air-conditioned cars, private bedrooms, amenities, and smooth ride. The train drew passengers not only from other railroads but from other Santa Fe trains such as the Chief.

The Super Chief quickly became "the" train to ride between Chicago and Los Angeles, much as New York Central's 20th Century Limited was the favored travel option of the time for the East Coast-bound. To acquaint passengers with the various points of interest located along the route, Santa Fe built seven signs marking such notable features as the Continental Divide and Raton Pass.

In the mid-1940s, company president Fred G. Gurley went to great lengths to solicit business from California's motion picture industry. A passenger agent was located in Hollywood specifically for the purpose of maintaining close contact with the movie studios. The train stopped at Pasadena to allow celebrities to board away from the "hustle and bustle" of Los Angeles' Union Passenger Terminal (LAUPT). When the Santa Fe was notified that a particular celebrity was going to be traveling on the Super Chief, a press release was issued to allow the media to interview and photograph the star.

Legendary jazz pianist Fats Waller died of pneumonia at the age of 39 on board the Super Chief on December 15, 1943.

In time, the passenger list would include many Hollywood stars, such as Richard Burton and Elizabeth Taylor, Humphrey Bogart and Lauren Bacall, Dean Martin and Jerry Lewis, Desi Arnaz and Lucille Ball, James Cagney, Judy Garland and Bing Crosby. The train's appeal was not limited to those in the entertainment industry, as it also played host to former presidents Harry S. Truman and Dwight D. Eisenhower, and their wives.

Several radio and TV episodes of the Jack Benny Show had plotlines involving the cast travelling on the Super Chief. In one, a tout at Los Angeles Union Station tried to convince Jack to take the El Capitan instead.

=== Three for Bedroom "C" ===
In June 1952, Warner Bros. Pictures released Three for Bedroom "C", a romantic comedy starring Gloria Swanson, James Warren, Fred Clark, Hans Conried, and Steve Brodie. In the film, an aging movie star (Swanson) hides out in a compartment during a cross-country journey from New York to Los Angeles aboard the Super Chief.

Swanson's first color film was one of very few to be shot entirely aboard actual railroad equipment. Santa Fe transported cars from the Super Chief to the production company's studio lot for filming. The film met with lukewarm reviews and was not a financial success, but did showcase the features of the Super Chief.

== Dining ==
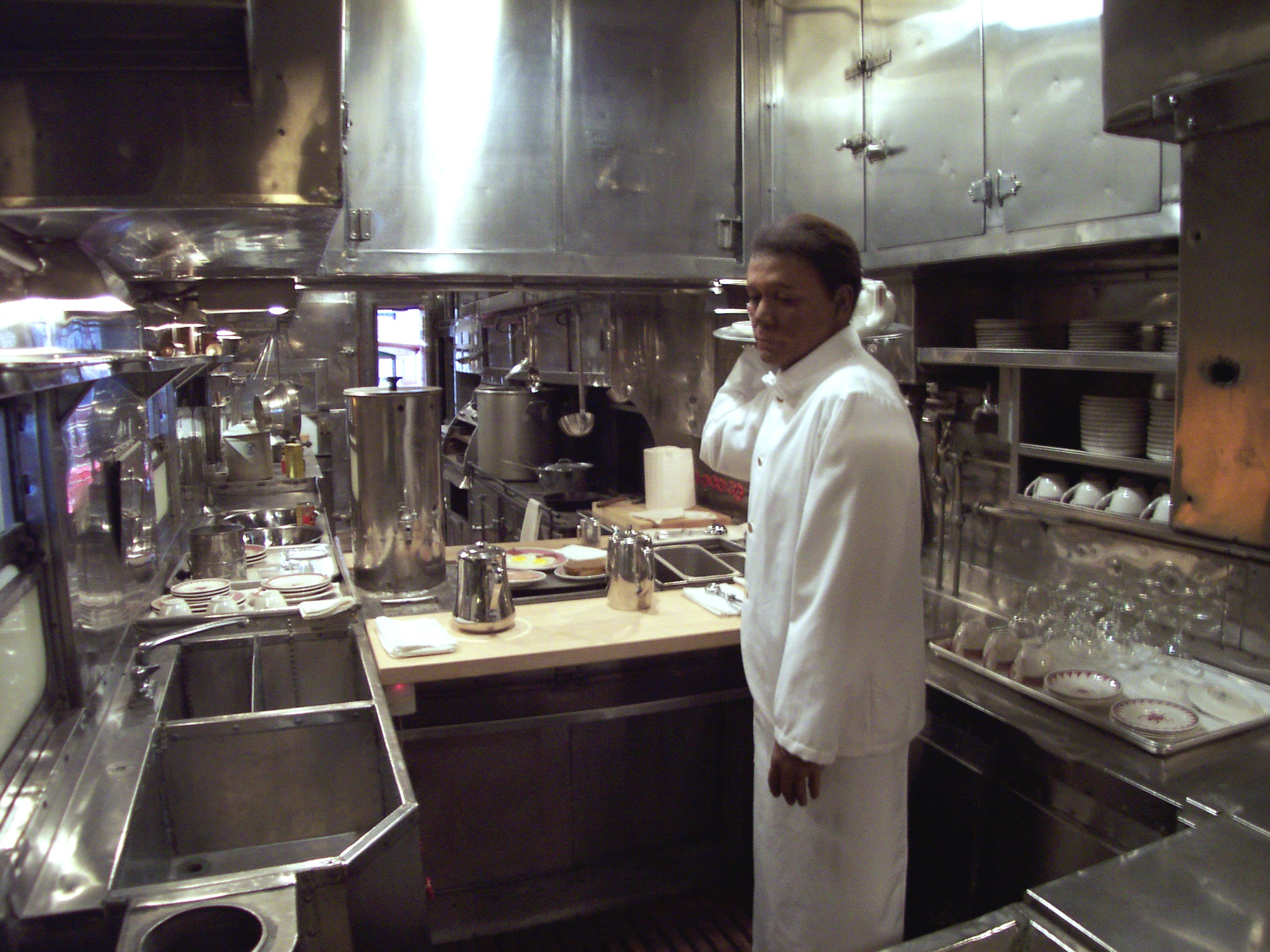
The pantry aboard former Santa Fe dining car #1474, the Cochiti. Over a million meals were served in the car, which remained in service through the late 1960s.

Most railroads began offering some form of meal service on their trains as an alternate to the poor fare typically found at trackside establishments even before the completion of the first transcontinental railroad. By the mid-1880s, dedicated dining cars were a normal part of all long-distance train consists departing from Chicago for points west, save for those of the Santa Fe, who relied on America's first interstate network of restaurants to feed its passengers en route. The "Harvey Houses", located strategically along the line, served top-quality meals to railroad patrons during water stops and other planned layovers and were favored over in-transit facilities for all trains operating west of Kansas City.

The Super Chief included dining cars, staffed by Fred Harvey Company personnel, as part of its standard consist of the outset. In general, the Super Chief operated 36-seat dining cars, although most of them were convertible to 48-seat dining cars with a flip-top (or change of) table and addition of chairs. Dining cars almost always operated with a lounge car coupled to them for bar-lounge service and a waiting area when the dining car was full. Unlike the Union Pacific "City" trains, the Super Chief and other Santa Fe trains did not use the "twin-unit" dining cars. Santa Fe, in general, ran somewhat shorter trains that could be serviced with a single dining car (although the heavyweight trains frequently operated in several sections, the streamlined trains generally did not). The height of Super Chief lounge and dining facilities came in 1951 with the new 600-series Dining Cars bracketed by the 500 series Pleasure Domes in front and a bar-lounge-dormitory unit in back (moved from the front of the trains). The train still operated with the Vista-series 4 Drawing Room, 1 double bedroom observation cars on the rear, albeit without any bar or buffet service.

The bar-lounge cars next to the diner always included dormitory space for the train crew (a staff of 3–4 cooks and 6–7 waiters) required for the two-night-and-one-day trip. The eight Pullmans on the train had a capacity of 150–200 passengers when full but often ran with single-occupancy rooms, making the passenger load less.

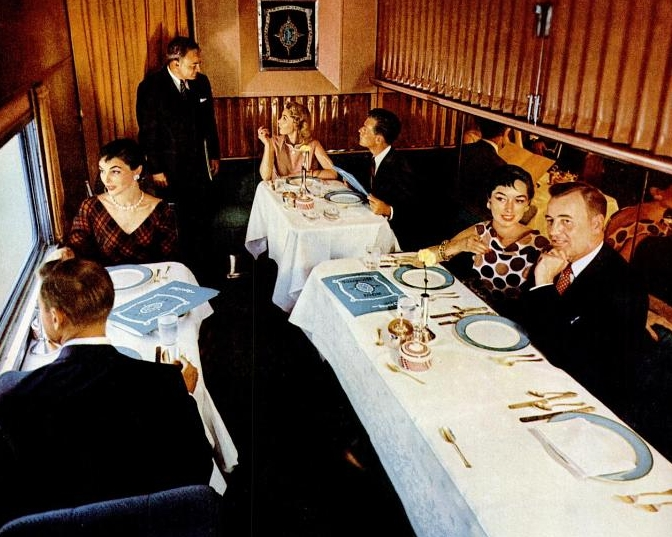
The Turquoise Room in 1955

When Santa Fe rolled out its new "Pleasure Dome"-Lounge cars in 1951, the railroad introduced the Turquoise Room, promoted as "The only private dining room in the world on rails". The room accommodated 12 guests and could be reserved anytime for private dinner or cocktail parties. The room was often used by celebrities and dignitaries. As was the case on other railroads, dining car service was a losing proposition financially. Santa Fe, more than any of its competitors, took the concept of using on-board meal service as a loss leader to the highest level to attract and retain customers. The name Super Chief became synonymous with the finest fare available on wheels.

=== Menu ===
The Continental cuisine offered aboard the Super Chief went beyond the American fare on other trains and often rivaled that served in many five-star restaurants. A "Wake-Up Cup" of coffee was brought to one's private bedroom each morning, on request, a service exclusive to the Super Chief. Breakfast and lunch were served à la carte, while dinner could be ordered either à la carte or table d'hôte.

The elaborate dinner offerings generally included caviar and other delicacies, cold salads, grilled and sautéed fish, sirloin steaks and filet mignon, lamb chops, and the like. For discerning palates, elegant champagne dinners were an option. One of the Super Chief's most popular signature dishes was the AT&SF version of pain perdu, simply and appropriately named "Santa Fe French Toast".

=== Mimbreño china ===
The decor, linens, and other dining car accoutrements reflected the same Southwestern flair prevalent throughout the train. Mary Colter, architect, Indian art expert, and 35-year veteran of the Fred Harvey Company, designed the china and silverware used on the Super Chief. Colter, who also designed the interiors of Fred Harvey's opulent La Fonda, La Posada, and El Tovar hotels, based her dinnerware motif on the Native American pictographs of animals and geometric patterns left behind on clay pots by the ancient inhabitants of the Rio Mimbres Valley in southwestern New Mexico around 1100 AD. Colter drew specific inspiration from the 700 pen-and-ink drawings of Mimbres pottery recorded by archeologist Harriet Cosgrove from 1924 to 1927 while excavating the Swarts Ruin in New Mexico with her husband Cornelius Cosgrove. Publication of the Swarts Ruin record created a sensation in 1932.

The "Mimbreño" pattern was produced between 1936 and 1970 by the Onondaga Pottery Co. of Syracuse, New York, under its better-known trade name, Syracuse China. The bottoms carried the inscription "Made expressly for Santa Fe Dining Car Service." These distinctive pieces made their debut on the dining car Cochiti in 1937. Used on the Super Chief and other named trains until the end of Santa Fe passenger service in 1971, some original Mimbreño dinnerware can still be found today in service on BNSF Railway business cars.

Mimbreño has been dubbed "the oldest of all railroad china" as its design concept dates back nearly ten centuries. Demand for surviving original pieces has created a collector's market and led to the issuance of authorized reproductions in recent years.

== See also ==
- Passenger train service on the Atchison, Topeka and Santa Fe Railway
