= 1913–14 Cornell Big Red men's ice hockey season =

- Home ice: Beebe Lake

Record
- Overall: 1–4–0
- Home: 0–1–0
- Road: 1–1–0
- Neutral: 0–2–0

Coaches and captains
- Head coach: E. J. Sawyer
- Captain: Otho Clark

The 1913–14 Cornell Big Red men's ice hockey season was the 13th season of play for the program.

== Season ==
Without the Intercollegiate Hockey Association, and more specifically the St. Nicholas Rink, to provide a stable venue for the Big Red, Cornell was limited to just five games during the season. On a positive note the team ended the program's losing streak at 8 games. The team was able to fix the goaltending woes that had plagued them the year before but the offense had yet to find its footing.

== Roster ==
No.	Nat.	Player	Class	Pos	Height	Weight	DoB	Hometown	Previous team
	(United States)	James S. Babbitt	Sophomore	F			1893-10-13	New York, New York
	(United States)	Marshall R. Barbour	Senior	F			1891-01-07	Pittsburgh, Pennsylvania
		Paul J. Barnhart	Senior	F
	(United States)	Robert G. Barton	Sophomore	F				New Rochelle, New York
		Alexander M. Beebee	Junior	G			1892-10-17
	(United States)	Otho M. Clark (C)	Senior	D			1889-05-07	Avon, New York
		Alfred C. Day	Senior	F
	(United States)	Francis T. Hunter	Sophomore	D			1893-06-24	New Rochelle, New York
	(United States)	Winthrop Kent	Junior	F			1891-03-24	Buffalo, New York
		Frank M. Rees	Senior	F
		Robbins		G
	(United States)	Frederick Spiegelberg Jr.	Sophomore	F			1895-11-17	New York, New York
	(United States)	Alfred D. Williams	Junior	F			1891-04-29	Brooklyn, New York

== Standings ==
1913–14 Collegiate ice hockey standings
	Intercollegiate							Overall					
	GP	W	L	T	PCT.	GF	GA	GP	W	L	T	GF	GA
Amherst	–	–	–	–	–	–	–	6	1	4	1	–	–
Army	5	0	5	0	.000	8	27	7	1	6	0	21	34
Columbia	3	1	2	0	.333	6	18	5	1	4	0	7	29
Cornell	5	1	4	0	.200	9	18	5	1	4	0	9	18
Dartmouth	7	5	2	0	.800	37	14	9	7	2	0	49	18
Harvard	10	7	3	0	.700	32	21	16	8	8	0	40	35
Holy Cross	–	–	–	–	–	–	–	–	–	–	–	–	–
Massachusetts Agricultural	8	6	2	0	.750	40	6	8	6	2	0	40	6
MIT	6	2	4	0	.333	21	33	8	2	6	0	25	49
Princeton	8	7	1	0	.875	33	10	13	10	3	0	54	25
Rensselaer	1	0	1	0	.000	0	8	1	0	1	0	0	8
Trinity	–	–	–	–	–	–	–	–	–	–	–	–	–
Tufts	–	–	–	–	–	–	–	–	–	–	–	–	–
Williams	7	5	2	0	.714	32	19	7	5	2	0	32	19
Yale	9	4	5	0	.444	25	26	14	6	8	0	34	40
YMCA College	–	–	–	–	–	–	–	–	–	–	–	–	–

== Schedule and results ==
Date	Opponent	Site	Result	Record
Regular season
December 23	vs. Yale*	Arena Ice Rink • Syracuse, New York	L 2–3	0–1–0
January 9	at Army*	West Point, New York	W 5–1	1–1–0
January 10	vs. Princeton*	St. Nicholas Rink • New York, New York	L 1–9	1–2–0
February 7	Columbia*	Beebe Lake • Ithaca, New York	L 0–2	1–3–0
February 14	at Yale*	Yale Rink • New Haven, Connecticut	L 1–3	1–4–0
*Non-conference game.
