= 1913–14 Harvard Crimson men's ice hockey season =

College ice hockey season

- Conference: 2nd IHL
- Home ice: Boston Arena

Record
- Overall: 8–8–0
- Conference: 3–3–0
- Home: 6–1–0
- Road: 1–2–0
- Neutral: 1–5–0

Coaches and captains
- Head coach: Alfred Winsor
- Captain: William Willetts

The 1913–14 Harvard Crimson men's ice hockey season was the 17th season of play for the program.

== Season ==
After paring the team down to 24 men, Harvard began its first year as a major sport with a tune-up game against the Boston Athletic Association. Soft ice and early-season jitters contributed to a less-than-stellar effort from the Crimson and they lost the match 1–3 while cycling through many of their alternate players. The loss was unfortunate but hardly damaging to their season. A bigger development was the continued and expanding interest of ice hockey for the student body. Undergraduates were so enamored with the idea of joining the team that a second squad of 34 men, completely separate from the Varsity and Freshman teams, was organized and a schedule arranged.

After the rather poor effort in the B. A. A. game, Harvard exploded out of the gate against MIT and did not take the pressure off all game, ending with a dominant 11–1 victory. The convincing victory demonstrated how the good the team could be as they embarked on their first ever holiday trip over the winter break. They would play Syracuse HC and Ottawa each twice with the team being billeted at the home of team captain Willetts in nearby Skaneateles.

The trip started well with the team producing a solid win against the Syracuse Club, but afterwards the results turned sour. Syracuse earned a split with a 2–1 win, then Ottawa strangled the Crimson offense, not allowing a goal in either of the two matches. The defense from Harvard, provided mostly by Willetts and Clafin, was notable but the lack of scoring punch doomed the Crimson from the start. The terrible results portended a bad season for the Crimson, and once they began their intercollegiate schedule began those predictions bore fruit.

Harvard could only just defeat Amherst a team they should have had not trouble against. Despite the close shaves, the Crimson alternates were gaining much needed game experience. Against Massachusetts Agricultural College the offense continued to struggle, showing up just in the nick of time to overcome a deficit in overtime and again escape with a one-goal victory. When the hosted Dartmouth the score was tight once more, but the team looked to be performing much more as a cohesive unit.

Their next game came against Princeton. Harvard had been a thorn in Princeton's side over the previous two years, being the only team to beat the Tigers the previous year. The Crimson defense had faced Princeton star Hobey Baker before and knew how to play against him. They used that experience to restrict the speedy Baker and keep the game tied for most of the contest. Even when Princeton opened the scoring it was a scant few minutes before the game was knotted at 1-all. Afterwards, no matter how hard the Tigers tried, they could not penetrate the stifling defense. A 14-minute overtime session was played to no effect, then an open-ended second overtime began and followed sudden-death rules. Harvard took full advantage of its many alternates while Princeton was forced to play with nearly the same seven players all game. The Tigers flagged from fatigue and in the 78th minute of what was scheduled as a 40-minute game, Saltonstall ended the game in Harvard's favor.

Harvard dropped their next game to McGill but when they faced Yale the four goal effort from Hopkins gave Harvard a chance at a second consecutive intercollegiate title. The Crimson had played each game over the previous month at the Boston Arena, however, and now they would have a second chance to prove their mettle on the road. When they met Yale in New Haven the Crimson were not prepared for the hard checking from the Elis and Yale pushed Harvard around for most of the game.

Three days later in a second rematch, Princeton could have tried to follow Yale's game plan but they stuck to their own high-octane game and simply outplayed the Crimson, scoring the final three goals in 4–2 victory. Worse for Harvard, Willetts and Philips were injured in the game and doubt was cast on their ability to compete in the final games against Princeton and Yale. Both players started the rubber match with Princeton a week later but it was clear that the Tigers were the better team. Despite keying their defense on Baker, the Tiger star could not be contained and assisted on three Princeton goals in a 4–1 victory.

== Roster ==
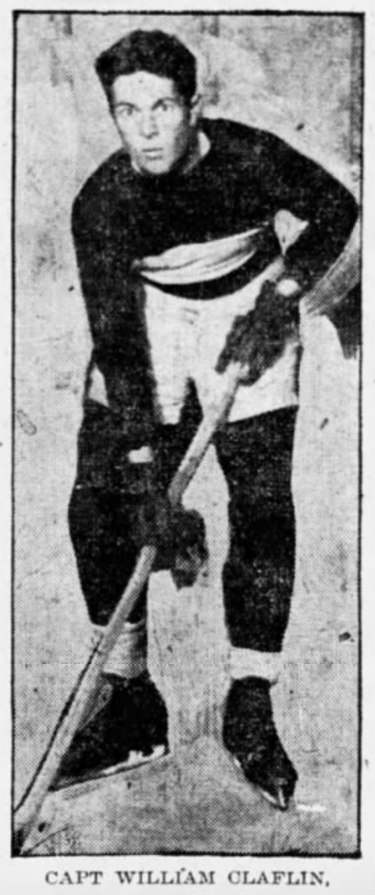
William Claflin ca. 1914

No.	Nat.	Player	Class	Pos	Height	Weight	DoB	Hometown	Previous team
	(United States)	Schuyler Adams	Senior	C	5' 6" (1.68 m)	131 lb (59 kg)		West Newton, Massachusetts	Newton High School
	(United States)	Philip M. Brown	Junior	D			1892-11-18	New Ipswich, New Hampshire
	(United States)	Gouverneur Carnochan	Senior	G		142 lb (64 kg)	1892-06-28	Manhattan, New York	St. Paul's School
	(United States)	William H. Claflin Jr.	Junior	D		156 lb (71 kg)	1893-06-08	Swampscott, Massachusetts	Noble and Greenough School
	(United States)	Clarence S. Clark	Sophomore	D		165 lb (75 kg)	1893-02-11	Germantown, Pennsylvania	Milton Academy
	(United States)	Sydney P. Clark	Senior	LW		154 lb (70 kg)		Chestnut Hill, Pennsylvania	Pomfret School
	(United States)	Alan Cunningham	Sophomore	D		162 lb (73 kg)	1895-01-11	Boston, Massachusetts	Noble and Greenough School
	(United States)	Laurence Curtis II	Sophomore	D		172 lb (78 kg)	1893-09-03	Boston, Massachusetts	Groton School
	(United States)	John C. Devereux	Senior	RW		146 lb (66 kg)		Utica, New York	Milton Academy
	(United States)	Augustus Doty	Sophomore	D		193 lb (88 kg)	1894-01-20	Waltham, Massachusetts	St. Paul's School
	(United States)	Steve Hopkins	Senior	C/LW		158 lb (72 kg)	1892-03-19	Newtonville, Massachusetts	Newton High School
		Henry Morgan	Senior	RW	5' 9" (1.75 m)	167 lb (76 kg)			St. Mark's School
	(United States)	Morgan B. Phillips	Junior	C/LW		180 lb (82 kg)	1894-10-22	Newton Center, Massachusetts	Milton Academy
	(United States)	Dexter Rumsey	Sophomore	C			1893-08-31	Buffalo, New York	St. Mark's School
	(United States)	Leverett Saltonstall	Senior	C		161 lb (73 kg)	1892-09-01	Chestnut Hill, Massachusetts	Noble and Greenough School
	(Canada)	Paul Smart	Senior	D		141 lb (64 kg)		Yarmouth, Nova Scotia	Newton High School
	(United States)	Harry P. Trainer	Junior	C			1891-12-08	Boston, Massachusetts
	(United States)	Elmer Wanamaker	Sophomore	C/LW		153 lb (69 kg)	1893-10-11	Wakefield, Massachusetts	Melrose High
	(United States)	Watson Washburn	Junior	G		162 lb (73 kg)	1894-06-13	New York, New York	Cutler School
	(United States)	William Willetts (C)	Senior	D		181 lb (82 kg)	1890-05-13	Skaneateles, New York	St. Paul's School

== Standings ==
1913–14 Collegiate ice hockey standings
	Intercollegiate							Overall					
	GP	W	L	T	PCT.	GF	GA	GP	W	L	T	GF	GA
Amherst	–	–	–	–	–	–	–	6	1	4	1	–	–
Army	5	0	5	0	.000	8	27	7	1	6	0	21	34
Columbia	3	1	2	0	.333	6	18	5	1	4	0	7	29
Cornell	5	1	4	0	.200	9	18	5	1	4	0	9	18
Dartmouth	7	5	2	0	.800	37	14	9	7	2	0	49	18
Harvard	10	7	3	0	.700	32	21	16	8	8	0	40	35
Holy Cross	–	–	–	–	–	–	–	–	–	–	–	–	–
Massachusetts Agricultural	8	6	2	0	.750	40	6	8	6	2	0	40	6
MIT	6	2	4	0	.333	21	33	8	2	6	0	25	49
Princeton	8	7	1	0	.875	33	10	13	10	3	0	54	25
Rensselaer	1	0	1	0	.000	0	8	1	0	1	0	0	8
Trinity	–	–	–	–	–	–	–	–	–	–	–	–	–
Tufts	–	–	–	–	–	–	–	–	–	–	–	–	–
Williams	7	5	2	0	.714	32	19	7	5	2	0	32	19
Yale	9	4	5	0	.444	25	26	14	6	8	0	34	40
YMCA College	–	–	–	–	–	–	–	–	–	–	–	–	–

1913–14 Intercollegiate Hockey League standings
	Conference								Overall					
	GP	W	L	T	PTS	SW	GF	GA	GP	W	L	T	GF	GA
Princeton *	5	4	1	0	.800	2	17	9	13	10	3	0	54	25
Harvard	6	3	3	0	.500	1	14	16	16	8	8	0	40	35
Yale	5	1	4	0	.200	0	11	21	14	6	8	0	34	40
* indicates conference champion

== Schedule and results ==
Date	Opponent	Site	Result	Record
Regular Season
December 13	vs. Boston Athletic Association*	Boston Arena • Boston, Massachusetts	L 1–3	0–1–0
December 17	vs. MIT*	Boston Arena • Boston, Massachusetts	W 11–1	1–1–0
December 27	at Syracuse Hockey Club*	Arena Ice Rink • Syracuse, New York	W 5–2	2–1–0
December 30	at Syracuse Hockey Club*	Arena Ice Rink • Syracuse, New York	L 1–2	2–2–0
January 2	vs. Ottawa*	Arena Ice Rink • Syracuse, New York	L 0–2	2–3–0
January 3	vs. Ottawa*	Arena Ice Rink • Syracuse, New York	L 0–3	2–4–0
January 7	Amherst*	Boston Arena • Boston, Massachusetts	W 1–0	3–4–0
January 14	Massachusetts Agricultural*	Boston Arena • Boston, Massachusetts	W 4–3 ^{OT}	4–4–0
January 17	Dartmouth*	Boston Arena • Boston, Massachusetts	W 2–1	5–4–0
January 24	Princeton	Boston Arena • Boston, Massachusetts	W 2–1 ^{2OT}	6–4–0 (1–0–0)
January 31	McGill*	Boston Arena • Boston, Massachusetts	L 1–2	6–5–0
February 6	Yale	Boston Arena • Boston, Massachusetts (Rivalry)	W 4–3 ^{2OT}	7–5–0 (2–0–0)
February 11	at Yale	Yale Arena • New Haven, Connecticut (Rivalry)	L 1–3	7–6–0 (2–1–0)
February 14	vs. Princeton	St. Nicholas Rink • New York, New York	L 2–4	7–7–0 (2–2–0)
February 21	vs. Princeton	St. Nicholas Rink • New York, New York	L 1–4	7–8–0 (2–3–0)
February 28	Yale	Boston Arena • Boston, Massachusetts (Rivalry)	W 4–1	8–8–0 (3–3–0)
*Non-conference game.
