= Swarts Ruin =

Coordinates: 32.694°N 107.846°W

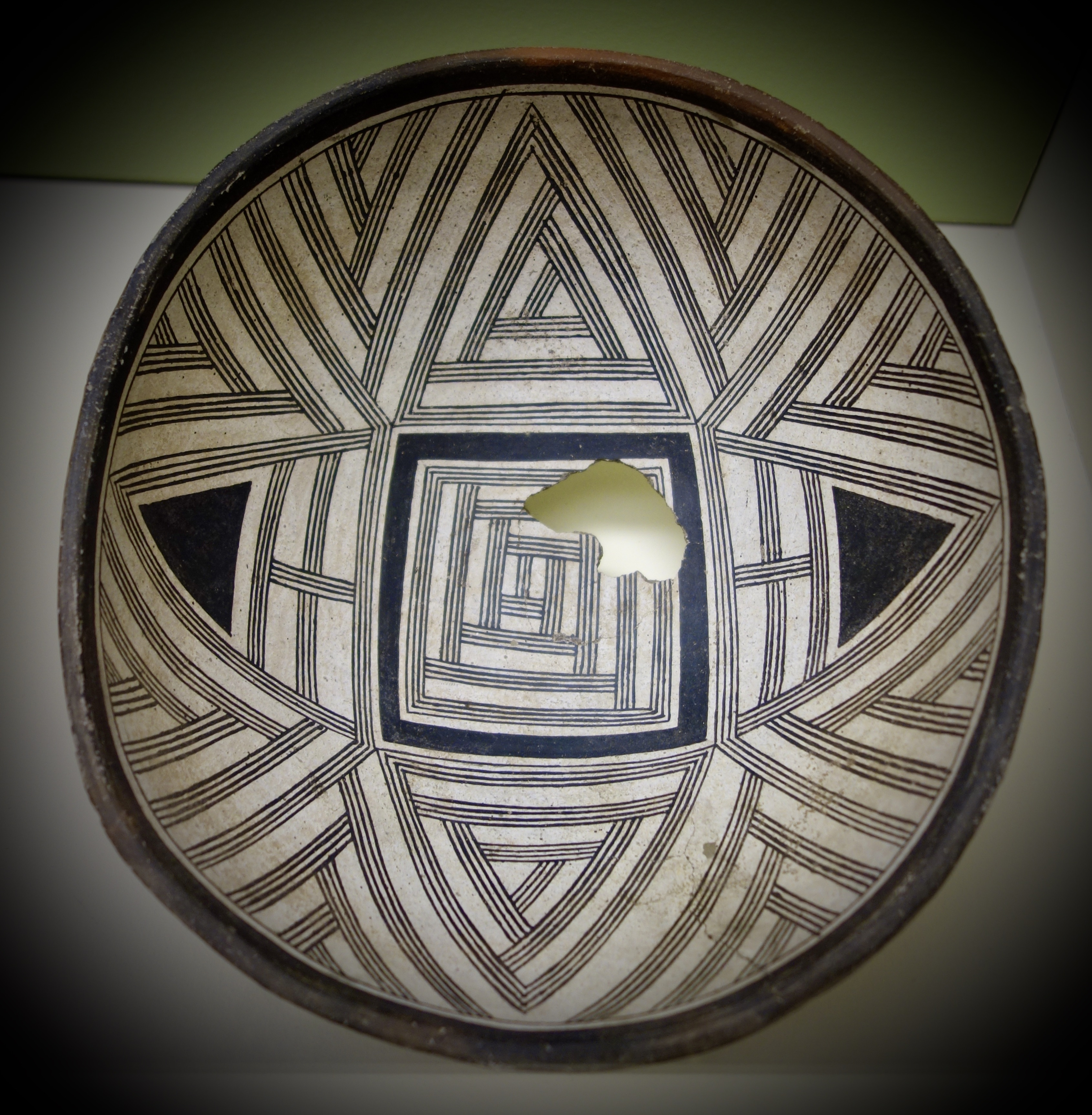
Mimbres bowl with geometric design, Swarts Ranch Ruin, Fitchburg Art Museum

Swarts Ruin, also known as the Swarts Ranch Ruin, is an archaeological site in New Mexico's Mimbres Valley excavated from 1924 to 1927 by Harriet S. ("Hattie") Cosgrove and Cornelius B. ("Burt") Cosgrove.

Although the self-taught husband-and-wife team had observed other archaeological digs and excavated on their own New Mexico property, Swarts Ruin would be the couple's first professional archaeology endeavor, financed by the Peabody Museum of Archaeology and Ethnology at Harvard University, where Swarts Ruin artifacts are conserved.

Although J. Walter Fewkes had brought Mimbres pottery to the public's attention in 1914, the publication in 1932 of The Swarts Ruin: A Typical Mimbres Site in Southwestern New Mexico gave readers not just the first coherent description of a Mimbres village, but caused a sensation thanks to Hattie's more than 700 painstaking pen-and-ink drawings of Mimbres bowl designs, which provided eclectic, enduring, and powerful visual inspiration to Native American potters and to a wide variety of Southwest artists.

Although the Cosgroves were aware of tree-ring dating, they did not know that charred wooden beams could yield accurate information under the new method; unfortunately no burned wood samples were saved. Nevertheless, the Cosgroves estimated the date of the site (1000–1150 CE) to within 20 years of what later archaeologists would determine a likely end date (1130 CE), based on comparison to similar Mimbres communities in the region.

The Swarts Ruin discovery broadly informed Mary Colter's designs for the Santa Fe Railroad's distinctive "Mimbreño" china, produced for the Super Chief (and later for business class dining cars) from 1936 to 1970. To satisfy collector demands, authorized "Mimbreño" reproductions have been manufactured since 1989.
