= 1913–14 Williams Ephs men's ice hockey season =

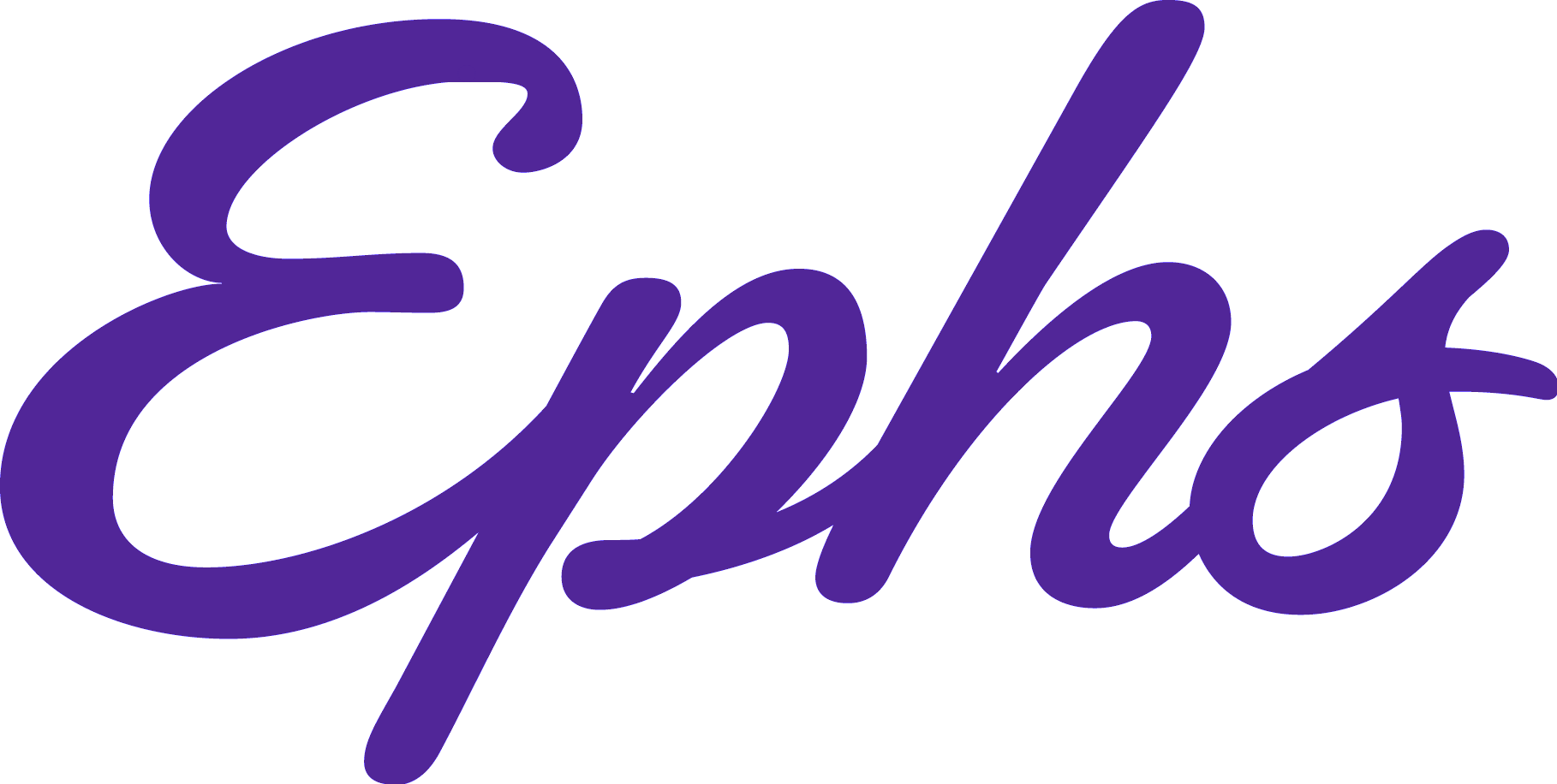
- Home ice: Weston Field Rink

Record
- Overall: 5–2–0
- Home: 4–1–0
- Road: 1–1–0

Coaches and captains
- Captain: John Rogers

The 1913–14 Williams Ephs men's ice hockey season was the 11th season of play for the program.

== Roster ==
No.	Nat.	Player	Class	Pos	Height	Weight	DoB	Hometown	Previous team
		Cole	Junior	G
		Theodore B. Conklin	Junior	LW
		Conrad F. Cutler	Junior	R
	(United States)	Henry H. Cutler	Sophomore	C			1892-09-21	Mount Hermon, Massachusetts
	(United States)	Delano deWindt	Sophomore	RW			1892-10-30	Chicago, Illinois
		John W. Gillett	Senior	C/LW
		Norman F. Hunnewell	Senior	D
		King		R
	(United States)	Frank A. McNamee Jr.	Junior	D			1892-12-17	Albany, New York

== Standings ==
1913–14 Collegiate ice hockey standings
	Intercollegiate							Overall					
	GP	W	L	T	PCT.	GF	GA	GP	W	L	T	GF	GA
Amherst	–	–	–	–	–	–	–	6	1	4	1	–	–
Army	5	0	5	0	.000	8	27	7	1	6	0	21	34
Columbia	3	1	2	0	.333	6	18	5	1	4	0	7	29
Cornell	5	1	4	0	.200	9	18	5	1	4	0	9	18
Dartmouth	7	5	2	0	.800	37	14	9	7	2	0	49	18
Harvard	10	7	3	0	.700	32	21	16	8	8	0	40	35
Holy Cross	–	–	–	–	–	–	–	–	–	–	–	–	–
Massachusetts Agricultural	8	6	2	0	.750	40	6	8	6	2	0	40	6
MIT	6	2	4	0	.333	21	33	8	2	6	0	25	49
Princeton	8	7	1	0	.875	33	10	13	10	3	0	54	25
Rensselaer	1	0	1	0	.000	0	8	1	0	1	0	0	8
Trinity	–	–	–	–	–	–	–	–	–	–	–	–	–
Tufts	–	–	–	–	–	–	–	–	–	–	–	–	–
Williams	7	5	2	0	.714	32	19	7	5	2	0	32	19
Yale	9	4	5	0	.444	25	26	14	6	8	0	34	40
YMCA College	–	–	–	–	–	–	–	–	–	–	–	–	–

== Schedule and results ==
Date	Opponent	Site	Result	Record
Regular Season
December 19	Massachusetts Agricultural*	Weston Field Rink • Williamstown, Massachusetts	L 1–8	0–1–0
January 11	Trinity*	Weston Field Rink • Williamstown, Massachusetts	W 12–3	1–1–0
February 7	Rensselaer*	Weston Field Rink • Williamstown, Massachusetts	W 8–0	2–1–0
February 11	YMCA College*	Weston Field Rink • Williamstown, Massachusetts	W 2–0	3–1–0
February 18	at Yale*	Yale Arena • New Haven, Connecticut	L 1–5	3–2–0
February 21	MIT*	Weston Field Rink • Williamstown, Massachusetts	W 4–1	4–2–0
February 23	Amherst*	Pratt Field Rink • Amherst, Massachusetts	W 4–2	5–2–0
*Non-conference game.
