= 1913–14 Columbia Lions men's ice hockey season =

- Conference: Independent

Record
- Overall: 1–4–0
- Road: 1–4–0

Coaches and captains
- Head coach: Rudolph von Bernuth; Rufus Trimble
- Captain: Robert Milbank

The 1913–14 Columbia Lions men's ice hockey season was the 18th season of play for the program.

== Season ==
After the dissolution of the IHA, Columbia no longer had access to the St. Nicholas Rink as a home arena (though they were still able to practice at the venue). While a few games were tentatively scheduled in December and January, none were played until February. the Lions were forced to play all of their games on the road during the season. While there was a glimmer of hope after the win against Cornell, three successive terrible losses had the team finish with a 1–4 record.

== Roster ==
No.	Nat.	Player	Class	Pos	Height	Weight	DoB	Hometown	Previous team
		Charles Bartow	Sophomore	C
		Frederic Dolbeare	Junior	D
		W. S. Johnson	Junior	D
		Robert W. Millbank Jr. (C)	Senior	G
		Howard M. Miller	Freshman	RW
		Sloane Miller	Junior	LW
		K. G. Reynolds	Freshman	D
		Warwick Todd	Junior	C
		Torrey Webb	Sophomore	R

== Standings ==
1913–14 Collegiate ice hockey standings
	Intercollegiate							Overall					
	GP	W	L	T	PCT.	GF	GA	GP	W	L	T	GF	GA
Amherst	–	–	–	–	–	–	–	6	1	4	1	–	–
Army	5	0	5	0	.000	8	27	7	1	6	0	21	34
Columbia	3	1	2	0	.333	6	18	5	1	4	0	7	29
Cornell	5	1	4	0	.200	9	18	5	1	4	0	9	18
Dartmouth	7	5	2	0	.800	37	14	9	7	2	0	49	18
Harvard	10	7	3	0	.700	32	21	16	8	8	0	40	35
Holy Cross	–	–	–	–	–	–	–	–	–	–	–	–	–
Massachusetts Agricultural	8	6	2	0	.750	40	6	8	6	2	0	40	6
MIT	6	2	4	0	.333	21	33	8	2	6	0	25	49
Princeton	8	7	1	0	.875	33	10	13	10	3	0	54	25
Rensselaer	1	0	1	0	.000	0	8	1	0	1	0	0	8
Trinity	–	–	–	–	–	–	–	–	–	–	–	–	–
Tufts	–	–	–	–	–	–	–	–	–	–	–	–	–
Williams	7	5	2	0	.714	32	19	7	5	2	0	32	19
Yale	9	4	5	0	.444	25	26	14	6	8	0	34	40
YMCA College	–	–	–	–	–	–	–	–	–	–	–	–	–

== Schedule and results ==
Date	Opponent	Site	Result	Record
Regular Season
February 3	at Dutchess Golf Club*	Poughkeepsie, New York	L 0–1	0–1–0
February 7	at Cornell*	Beebe Lake • Ithaca, New York	W 2–0	1–1–0
February 11	at St. Paul's School*	Concord, New Hampshire	L 1–10	1–2–0
February 12	at Dartmouth*	Occom pond • Hanover, New Hampshire	L 2–12	1–3–0
February 13	at MIT*	Boston Arena • Boston, Massachusetts	L 2–6	1–4–0
*Non-conference game.
