= 1913–14 Massachusetts Agricultural Aggies men's ice hockey season =

- Home ice: Campus Pond

Record
- Overall: 6–2–0
- Road: 6–2–0

Coaches and captains
- Captain: Dettmar Jones

The 1913–14 Massachusetts Agricultural Aggies men's ice hockey season was the 6th season of play for the program.

== Season ==
Mass Ag continued to dominate the smaller colleges of ice hockey. The Aggies allowed just one goal in six games while scoring thirty seven themselves. The team's two losses came against Ivy League competition but the Aggies acquitted themselves well in both.

== Roster ==
| No. | Nat. | Player | Class | Pos | Height | Weight | DoB | Hometown | Previous team |
|---|---|---|---|---|---|---|---|---|---|
| | | Herbert H. Archibald | Junior |
| | | David H. Buttrick | Freshman | G |
| | | Ray L. Chisholm | Sophomore |
| | | Charles H. Fernald II | Sophomore |
| | | John G. Hutchinson | Senior |
| | | Arthur Johnson | Junior |
| | | Dettmar W. Jones (C) | Senior |
| | | Lester W. Needham | Senior |
| | (United States) | Louis W. Ross | Freshman | | | | 1893-07-18 | Arlington, Massachusetts |

== Standings ==
1913–14 Collegiate ice hockey standings
| | Intercollegiate | | | | | | | Overall | | | | | |
| | GP | W | L | T | PCT. | GF | GA | GP | W | L | T | GF | GA |
|---|---|---|---|---|---|---|---|---|---|---|---|---|---|
| Amherst | – | – | – | – | – | – | – | 6 | 1 | 4 | 1 | – | – |
| Army | 5 | 0 | 5 | 0 | .000 | 8 | 27 | 7 | 1 | 6 | 0 | 21 | 34 |
| Columbia | 3 | 1 | 2 | 0 | .333 | 6 | 18 | 5 | 1 | 4 | 0 | 7 | 29 |
| Cornell | 5 | 1 | 4 | 0 | .200 | 9 | 18 | 5 | 1 | 4 | 0 | 9 | 18 |
| Dartmouth | 7 | 5 | 2 | 0 | .800 | 37 | 14 | 9 | 7 | 2 | 0 | 49 | 18 |
| Harvard | 10 | 7 | 3 | 0 | .700 | 32 | 21 | 16 | 8 | 8 | 0 | 40 | 35 |
| Holy Cross | – | – | – | – | – | – | – | – | – | – | – | – | – |
| Massachusetts Agricultural | 8 | 6 | 2 | 0 | .750 | 40 | 6 | 8 | 6 | 2 | 0 | 40 | 6 |
| MIT | 6 | 2 | 4 | 0 | .333 | 21 | 33 | 8 | 2 | 6 | 0 | 25 | 49 |
| Princeton | 8 | 7 | 1 | 0 | .875 | 33 | 10 | 13 | 10 | 3 | 0 | 54 | 25 |
| Rensselaer | 1 | 0 | 1 | 0 | .000 | 0 | 8 | 1 | 0 | 1 | 0 | 0 | 8 |
| Trinity | – | – | – | – | – | – | – | – | – | – | – | – | – |
| Tufts | – | – | – | – | – | – | – | – | – | – | – | – | – |
| Williams | 7 | 5 | 2 | 0 | .714 | 32 | 19 | 7 | 5 | 2 | 0 | 32 | 19 |
| Yale | 9 | 4 | 5 | 0 | .444 | 25 | 26 | 14 | 6 | 8 | 0 | 34 | 40 |
| YMCA College | – | – | – | – | – | – | – | – | – | – | – | – | – |

== Schedule and results ==
| Date | Opponent | Site | Result | Record |
Regular Season
| December 19 | at Williams* | Weston Field Rink • Williamstown, Massachusetts | W 8–1 | 1–0–0 |
| January 3 | at Army* | West Point, New York | W 5–0 | 2–0–0 |
| January 10 | at Dartmouth* | Hanover, New Hampshire | L 0–1 | 2–1–0 |
| January 14 | at Harvard* | Boston Arena • Boston, Massachusetts | L 3–4 ^{OT} | 2–2–0 |
| January 17 | at Holy Cross* | Worcester, Massachusetts | W 13–0 | 3–2–0 |
| January 21 | at YMCA College* | Pratt Field Rink • Springfield, Massachusetts | W 2–0 | 4–2–0 |
| February 13 | vs. YMCA College* | Pratt Field Rink • Amherst, Massachusetts | W 5–0 | 5–2–0 |
| February 14 | at Amherst* | Pratt Field Rink • Amherst, Massachusetts | W 4–0 | 6–2–0 |
*Non-conference game.
