= 1921–22 Harvard Crimson men's ice hockey season =

1921-22 hockey season

Eastern Intercollegiate Champion Triangular Hockey League, Champion
- Conference: 1st Triangular League
- Home ice: Boston Arena

Record
- Overall: 8–1–2
- Conference: 4–0–0
- Home: 5–1–1
- Road: 1–0–0
- Neutral: 2–0–1

Coaches and captains
- Head coach: William Claflin
- Captain: George Owen

The 1921–22 Harvard Crimson men's ice hockey season was the 24th season of play for the program.

== Season ==
Before the season, Harvard finally accepted the trend of all other college teams and agreed to play 6-on-6 hockey for the year. Additionally, Harvard accepted the new practice of playing its two defenders side by sire rather than one in front of the other. The changes did little to hamper the Crimson in their first game, however, when they returned from their Christmas break the team had to quickly prepare for Toronto. The Blues were considered by many as the top amateur team in North America and they demonstrated why when they dominated Harvard to the tune of a 6–1 victory. Harvard was able to get much more practice time before their next game and when they faced Dalhousie they appeared much more themselves.

The Crimson didn't lose another game after the Toronto debacle, though they did tie two amateur clubs in the middle of their season. After wrapping up the Triangular League championship, Harvard put together an informal group of players, composed of members of both the varsity and freshman teams, and played an exhibition match with Boston College. The cross-town rivals won the game in overtime, but Harvard was missing both its starting goaltender and team captain, so there was little doubt as to which varsity squad was the better.

== Roster ==
| No. | Nat. | Player | Class | Pos | Height | Weight | DoB | Hometown | Previous team |
|---|---|---|---|---|---|---|---|---|---|
| | (United States) | Donald Angier | Senior | W | | | 1900-01-12 | Newton, Massachusetts | Taft School |
| | (United States) | Charles W. Baker | Senior | W | | | 1900-12-18 | New York, New York | St. Paul's School |
| | (United States) | William E. Crosby Jr. | Sophomore | D | | | | West Newton, Massachusetts |
| | (United States) | John G. Flint | Junior | G | | | | Boston, Massachusetts |
| | (United States) | Mitchell Gratwick | Senior | D | | | 1900-05-15 | Buffalo, New York | Philips Academy |
| | (England) | Sidney C. Graves | Sophomore | D | | | 1901-07-21 |
| | (United States) | Richard R. Higgins | Senior | G | | | | Winchester, Massachusetts |
| | (United States) | Francis S. Hill | Sophomore | C/LW | | | 1900-12-14 | Boston, Massachusetts |
| | (United States) | Joseph Larocque Jr. | Junior | C/W | | | | Bernardsville, New Jersey |
| | (United States) | John M. Martin | Senior | C | | | 1900-05-09 | Manchester, New Hampshire | Pomfret School |
| | (United States) | George Owen Jr. (C) | Junior | D | 5' 11" (1.8 m) | 190 lb (86 kg) | 1901-12-02 | Hamilton, Ontario |
| | (United States) | George G. Walker | Sophomore | W | | | 1900-12-14 | Richmond, New York | St. Paul's School |

== Standings ==
1921–22 Eastern Collegiate ice hockey standings
| | Intercollegiate | | | | | | | Overall | | | | | |
| | GP | W | L | T | Pct. | GF | GA | GP | W | L | T | GF | GA |
|---|---|---|---|---|---|---|---|---|---|---|---|---|---|
| Amherst | 10 | 4 | 6 | 0 | .400 | 14 | 15 | 10 | 4 | 6 | 0 | 14 | 15 |
| Army | 7 | 4 | 2 | 1 | .643 | 23 | 11 | 9 | 5 | 3 | 1 | 26 | 15 |
| Bates | 7 | 3 | 4 | 0 | .429 | 17 | 16 | 13 | 8 | 5 | 0 | 44 | 25 |
| Boston College | 3 | 3 | 0 | 0 | 1.000 | 16 | 3 | 8 | 4 | 3 | 1 | 23 | 16 |
| Bowdoin | 3 | 0 | 2 | 1 | .167 | 2 | 4 | 9 | 2 | 6 | 1 | 12 | 18 |
| Clarkson | 1 | 0 | 1 | 0 | .000 | 2 | 12 | 2 | 0 | 2 | 0 | 9 | 20 |
| Colby | 4 | 1 | 2 | 1 | .375 | 5 | 13 | 7 | 3 | 3 | 1 | 16 | 25 |
| Colgate | 3 | 0 | 3 | 0 | .000 | 3 | 14 | 4 | 0 | 4 | 0 | 7 | 24 |
| Columbia | 7 | 3 | 3 | 1 | .500 | 21 | 24 | 7 | 3 | 3 | 1 | 21 | 24 |
| Cornell | 5 | 4 | 1 | 0 | .800 | 17 | 10 | 5 | 4 | 1 | 0 | 17 | 10 |
| Dartmouth | 6 | 4 | 1 | 1 | .750 | 10 | 5 | 6 | 4 | 1 | 1 | 10 | 5 |
| Hamilton | 8 | 7 | 1 | 0 | .875 | 45 | 13 | 9 | 7 | 2 | 0 | 51 | 22 |
| Harvard | 6 | 6 | 0 | 0 | 1.000 | 33 | 5 | 11 | 8 | 1 | 2 | 51 | 17 |
| Massachusetts Agricultural | 9 | 5 | 4 | 0 | .556 | 16 | 23 | 11 | 6 | 5 | 0 | 20 | 30 |
| MIT | 6 | 3 | 3 | 0 | .500 | 14 | 18 | 10 | 4 | 6 | 0 | – | – |
| Pennsylvania | 7 | 2 | 5 | 0 | .286 | 16 | 28 | 8 | 3 | 5 | 0 | 23 | 29 |
| Princeton | 7 | 2 | 5 | 0 | .286 | 12 | 21 | 10 | 3 | 6 | 1 | 21 | 28 |
| Rensselaer | 5 | 0 | 5 | 0 | .000 | 2 | 28 | 5 | 0 | 5 | 0 | 2 | 28 |
| Union | 0 | 0 | 0 | 0 | – | 0 | 0 | 6 | 2 | 4 | 0 | 12 | 12 |
| Williams | 8 | 3 | 4 | 1 | .438 | 27 | 19 | 8 | 3 | 4 | 1 | 27 | 19 |
| Yale | 14 | 7 | 7 | 0 | .500 | 46 | 39 | 19 | 9 | 10 | 0 | 55 | 54 |
| YMCA College | 6 | 2 | 4 | 0 | .333 | 3 | 21 | 6 | 2 | 4 | 0 | 3 | 21 |

1921–22 Triangular Hockey League standings
| | Conference | | | | | | | | Overall | | | | | |
| | GP | W | L | T | PTS | SW | GF | GA | GP | W | L | T | GF | GA |
|---|---|---|---|---|---|---|---|---|---|---|---|---|---|---|
| Harvard * | 4 | 4 | 0 | 0 | 1.000 | 2 | 21 | 3 | 11 | 8 | 1 | 2 | 51 | 17 |
| Yale | 4 | 2 | 2 | 0 | .500 | 1 | 8 | 12 | 19 | 9 | 10 | 0 | 55 | 54 |
| Princeton | 4 | 0 | 4 | 0 | .000 | 0 | 3 | 17 | 10 | 3 | 6 | 1 | 21 | 27 |
* indicates conference champion

== Schedule and results ==
| Date | Opponent | Site | Result | Record |
Regular season
| December 21 | St. Paul's School* | Boston Arena • Boston, Massachusetts | W 9–1 | 1–0–0 |
| January 3 | Toronto* | Boston Arena • Boston, Massachusetts | L 1–6 | 1–1–0 |
| January 14 | Dalhousie* | Boston Arena • Boston, Massachusetts | W 4–1 | 2–1–0 |
| January 21 | Princeton | Philadelphia Ice Palace • Philadelphia, Pennsylvania | W 3–0 | 3–1–0 (1–0–0) |
| January 27 | vs. MIT* | Boston Arena • Boston, Massachusetts | W 9–2 | 4–1–0 |
| January 31 | vs. Boston Athletic Association* | Boston Arena • Boston, Massachusetts | T 3–3 ^{2OT} | 4–1–1 |
| February 6 | Westminster Hockey Club* | Boston Arena • Boston, Massachusetts | T 1–1 | 4–1–2 |
| February 11 | Yale | Boston Arena • Boston, Massachusetts (Rivalry) | W 6–2 | 5–1–2 (2–0–0) |
| February 15 | Dartmouth* | Boston Arena • Boston, Massachusetts | W 3–0 | 6–1–2 |
| February 18 | Princeton | Boston Arena • Boston, Massachusetts | W 9–0 | 7–1–2 (3–0–0) |
| February 25 | at Yale | New Haven Arena • New Haven, Connecticut (Rivalry) | W 3–1 | 8–1–2 (4–0–0) |
| March 2 | vs. Boston College* | Boston Arena • Boston, Massachusetts (Exhibition) | L 2–4 ^{2OT} | |
*Non-conference game.
