= 1913–14 Dartmouth men's ice hockey season =

- Conference: Independent
- Home ice: Occom Pond

Record
- Overall: 7–2–0
- Home: 2–0–0
- Road: 4–2–0
- Neutral: 1–0–0

Coaches and captains
- Head coach: Fred Rocque
- Captain: John Dellinger

The 1913–14 Dartmouth men's ice hockey season was the 9th season of play for the program.

== Season ==
Dartmouth built upon their success the year before with three wins to open their season. Despite the demise of the Intercollegiate Hockey Association, The Greens had a chance to capture the Intercollegiate Championship if they could defeat the major powers. Their first test came against Princeton and while the team was able to withstand the assault from the Tigers, Dartmouth was unable to score in the game and lost 0–2. The team still had a chance for a title if they could get some help but, after dropping their next game to Harvard, Dartmouth saw their opportunity slip through their fingers.

The offense resurfaced when they began playing again in February and carried the team to four consecutive victories. The Greens ended the year as the third best team in the country (behind only the teams they could not defeat) while Clarence Wanamaker set a program record with 20 goals on the year.

Note: Dartmouth College did not possess a moniker for its athletic teams until the 1920s, however, the university had adopted 'Dartmouth Green' as its school color in 1866.

== Roster ==
No.	Nat.	Player	Class	Pos	Height	Weight	DoB	Hometown	Previous team
	(United States)	John L. Dellinger	Senior	D			1890-12-17	Saint Paul, Minnesota
	(United States)	Arthur I. Donahue	Junior	G				Medford, Massachusetts
		Harold T. Johnson	Senior	D
	(United States)	Henry B. Frost	Senior	LW			1892-08-08	Arlington, Massachusetts	Arlington High School
	(United States)	Carl N. Holmes	Sophomore	LW				Somerville, Massachusetts
	(United States)	Harris F. Murchie	Sophomore	RW				Maine
		John D. Pendleton	Junior	C
	(United States)	Leon P. Tuck	Junior	C	5' 9" (1.75 m)	181 lb (82 kg)	1891-05-25	Winchester, Massachusetts
	(United States)	Clarence L. Wanamaker	Junior	R			1892-08-03	Melrose, Massachusetts

== Standings ==
1913–14 Collegiate ice hockey standings
	Intercollegiate							Overall					
	GP	W	L	T	PCT.	GF	GA	GP	W	L	T	GF	GA
Amherst	–	–	–	–	–	–	–	6	1	4	1	–	–
Army	5	0	5	0	.000	8	27	7	1	6	0	21	34
Columbia	3	1	2	0	.333	6	18	5	1	4	0	7	29
Cornell	5	1	4	0	.200	9	18	5	1	4	0	9	18
Dartmouth	7	5	2	0	.800	37	14	9	7	2	0	49	18
Harvard	10	7	3	0	.700	32	21	16	8	8	0	40	35
Holy Cross	–	–	–	–	–	–	–	–	–	–	–	–	–
Massachusetts Agricultural	8	6	2	0	.750	40	6	8	6	2	0	40	6
MIT	6	2	4	0	.333	21	33	8	2	6	0	25	49
Princeton	8	7	1	0	.875	33	10	13	10	3	0	54	25
Rensselaer	1	0	1	0	.000	0	8	1	0	1	0	0	8
Trinity	–	–	–	–	–	–	–	–	–	–	–	–	–
Tufts	–	–	–	–	–	–	–	–	–	–	–	–	–
Williams	7	5	2	0	.714	32	19	7	5	2	0	32	19
Yale	9	4	5	0	.444	25	26	14	6	8	0	34	40
YMCA College	–	–	–	–	–	–	–	–	–	–	–	–	–

== Schedule and results ==
Date	Opponent	Site	Result	Record
Regular Season
December 29	at MIT*	Boston Arena • Boston, Massachusetts	W 11–1	1–0–0
December 31	at Pilgrim Athletic Association*	Boston Arena • Boston, Massachusetts	W 6–2	2–0–0
January 10	Massachusetts Agricultural*	Occom Pond • Hanover, New Hampshire	W 2–1	3–0–0
January 15	vs. Princeton*	Boston Arena • Boston, Massachusetts	L 0–2	3–1–0
January 17	at Harvard*	Boston Arena • Boston, Massachusetts	L 1–2	3–2–0
February 2	vs. Yale*	Yale Arena • New Haven, Connecticut	W 4–3	4–2–0
February 3	at Army*	West Point, New York	W 7–3	5–2–0
February 13	Columbia*	Occom Pond • Hanover, New Hampshire	W 12–2	6–2–0
February 20	at St. Paul's School*	Concord, New Hampshire	W 6–2	7–2–0
*Non-conference game.
