= 1913–14 Army Cadets men's ice hockey season =

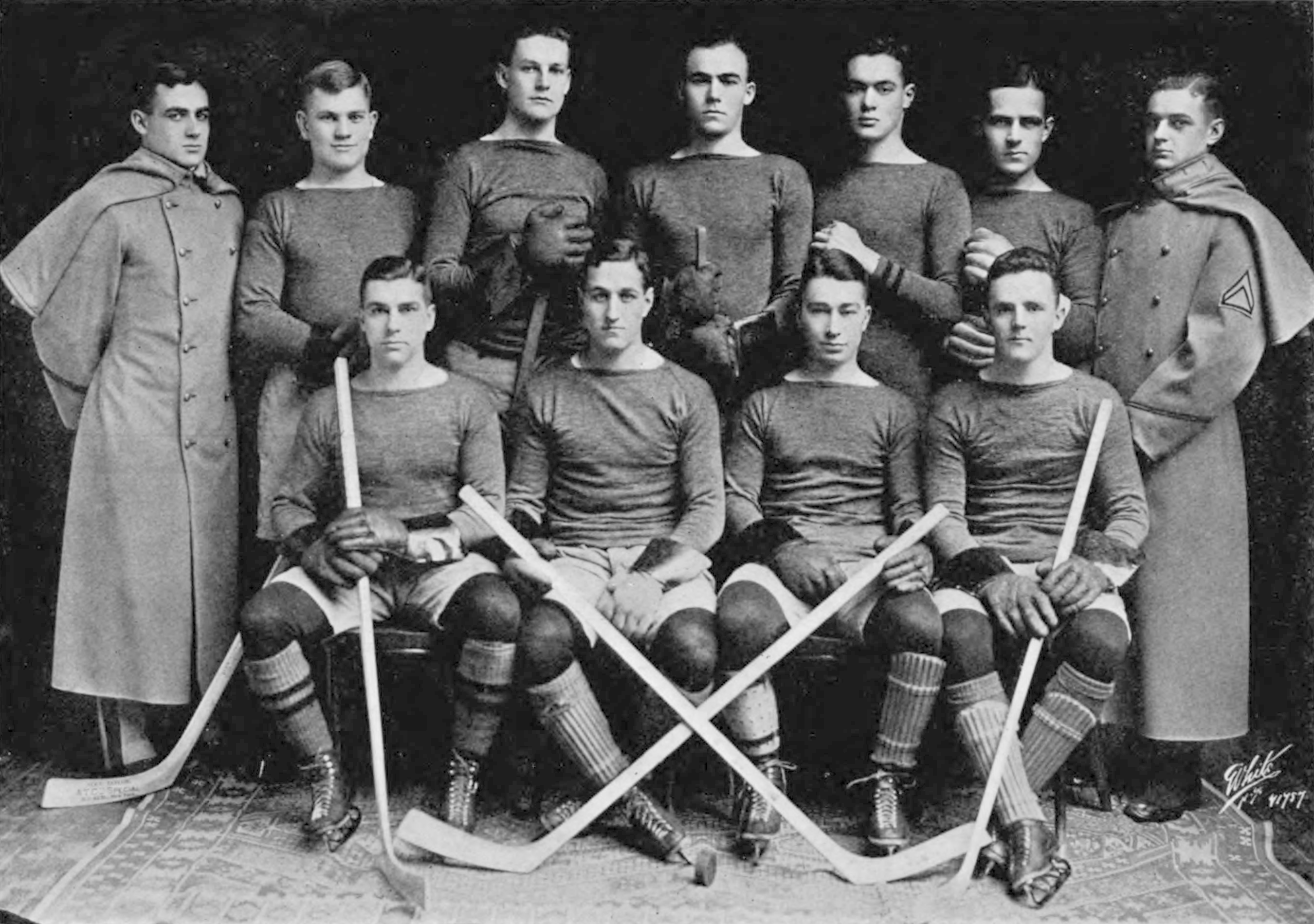
- Conference: Independent
- Home ice: Lusk Reservoir

Record
- Overall: 1–6–0

Coaches and captains
- Head coach: Philip Gordon
- Captain: Ralph Royce

The 1913–14 Army Cadets men's ice hockey season was the 11th season of play for the program.

== Season ==
For the 1914 season, Army played a much tougher schedule than previous years. As a result, the team posted one of the worst records in team history, winning just one game against a secondary school.

== Roster ==
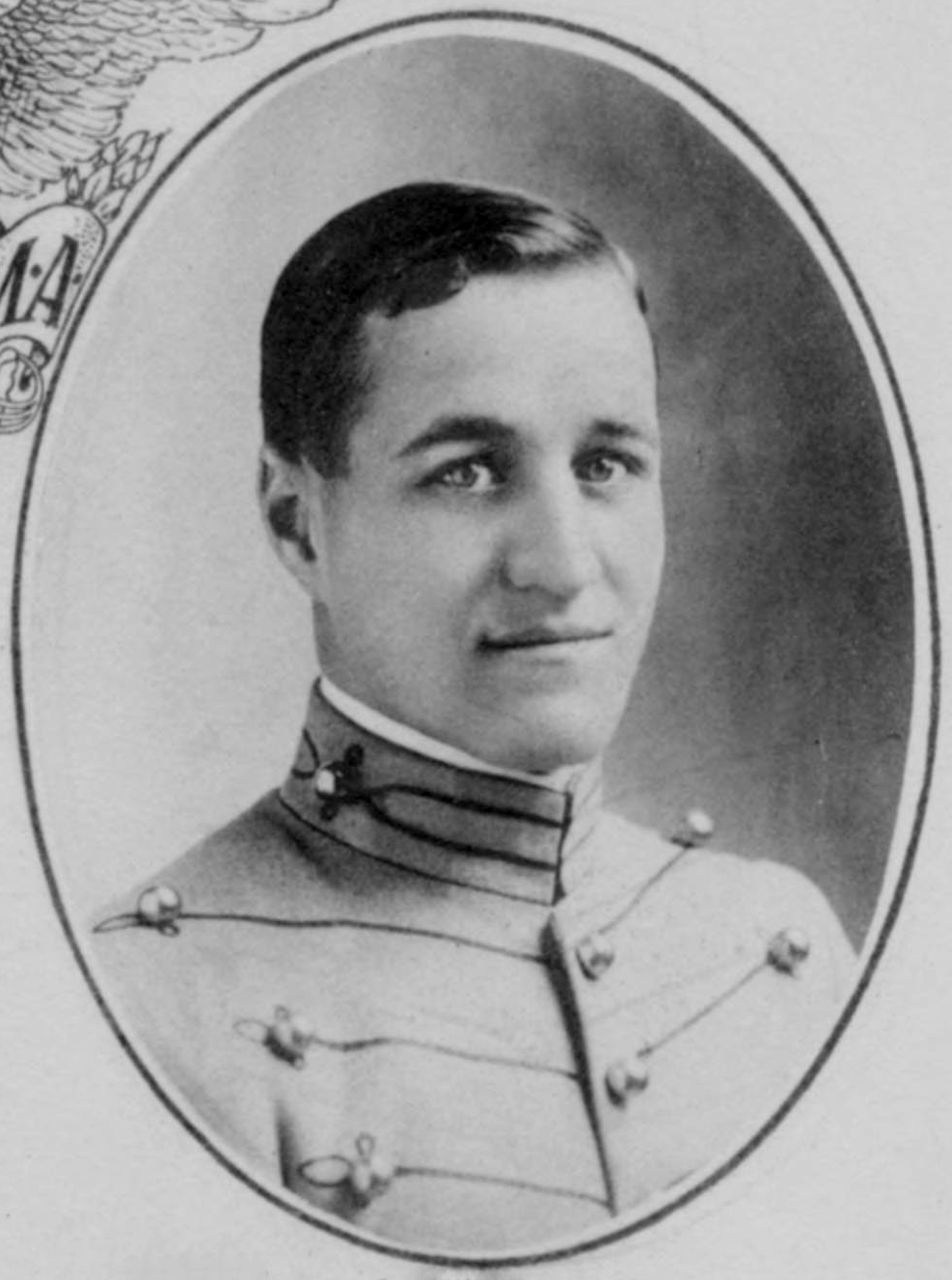
Ralph Royce

No.	Nat.	Player	Class	Pos	Height	Weight	DoB	Hometown	Previous team
	(United States)	Latham L. Brundred	Sophomore	D			1893-10-02	Pennsylvania
	(United States)	Robert W. Crawford	Senior	LW/RW			1891-09-17	Warsaw, New York
	(United States)	Arthur R. Harris	Senior	C			1890-08-01	Norfolk, Nebraska
	(United States)	John K. Meneely	Junior	LW			1890-08-15	New York
	(United States)	Frank W. Milburn	Senior	R/D			1892-01-11	Jasper, Indiana
	(United States)	William F. Redfield	Freshman	RW			1894-04-21	New York
	(United States)	Ralph Royce	Senior	R/D			1890-06-28	Marquette, Michigan
	(United States)	Robert W. Strong	Junior	G			1890-03-12	Kingsville, Ohio

== Standings ==
1913–14 Collegiate ice hockey standings
	Intercollegiate							Overall					
	GP	W	L	T	PCT.	GF	GA	GP	W	L	T	GF	GA
Amherst	–	–	–	–	–	–	–	6	1	4	1	–	–
Army	5	0	5	0	.000	8	27	7	1	6	0	21	34
Columbia	3	1	2	0	.333	6	18	5	1	4	0	7	29
Cornell	5	1	4	0	.200	9	18	5	1	4	0	9	18
Dartmouth	7	5	2	0	.800	37	14	9	7	2	0	49	18
Harvard	10	7	3	0	.700	32	21	16	8	8	0	40	35
Holy Cross	–	–	–	–	–	–	–	–	–	–	–	–	–
Massachusetts Agricultural	8	6	2	0	.750	40	6	8	6	2	0	40	6
MIT	6	2	4	0	.333	21	33	8	2	6	0	25	49
Princeton	8	7	1	0	.875	33	10	13	10	3	0	54	25
Rensselaer	1	0	1	0	.000	0	8	1	0	1	0	0	8
Trinity	–	–	–	–	–	–	–	–	–	–	–	–	–
Tufts	–	–	–	–	–	–	–	–	–	–	–	–	–
Williams	7	5	2	0	.714	32	19	7	5	2	0	32	19
Yale	9	4	5	0	.444	25	26	14	6	8	0	34	40
YMCA College	–	–	–	–	–	–	–	–	–	–	–	–	–

== Schedule and results ==
Date	Opponent	Site	Result	Record
Regular Season
January 3	Massachusetts Agricultural*	Lusk Reservoir • West Point, New York	L 0–5	0–1–0
January 9	Cornell*	Lusk Reservoir • West Point, New York	L 1–5 †	0–2–0
	N.Y. National Guard 7th Regiment*	Lusk Reservoir • West Point, New York	L 4–7	0–3–0
January 19	Princeton*	Lusk Reservoir • West Point, New York	L 0–5 ‡	0–4–0
	Stone School*	Lusk Reservoir • West Point, New York	W 9–0	1–4–0
February 3	Dartmouth*	Lusk Reservoir • West Point, New York	L 3–7	1–5–0
	Amherst*	Lusk Reservoir • West Point, New York	L 4–5	1–6–0
*Non-conference game.

† Army records indicate a 1–0 win, however, contemporary news reports have Cornell winning 5–1.
‡ Army records indicate a 3–5 loss, however, contemporary news reports have Princeton winning 5–0.
