= 1913–14 MIT Engineers men's ice hockey season =

- Conference: Independent
- Home ice: Boston Arena

Record
- Overall: 2–6–0
- Home: 2–2–0
- Road: 0–1–0
- Neutral: 0–3–0

Coaches and captains
- Captain: Norman MacLeod

The 1913–14 MIT Engineers men's ice hockey season was the 15th season of play for the program.

== Season ==
The team did not have a head coach but Nelson MacRae served as team managers.

Note: Massachusetts Institute of Technology athletics were referred to as 'Engineers' or 'Techmen' during the first two decades of the 20th century. By 1920 all sports programs had adopted the Engineer moniker.

== Roster ==
| No. | Nat. | Player | Class | Pos | Height | Weight | DoB | Hometown | Previous team |
|---|---|---|---|---|---|---|---|---|---|
| | | Clarence Cochrane | Freshman | D |
| | | Ralph L. Fletcher | Junior | RW |
| | | Prescott W. Gould | Freshman | D |
| | | Harold P. Gray | Sophomore |
| | | Theodore C. Jewett | Sophomore |
| | | Harold Y. Keeler | Freshman |
| | (United States) | Richard O. Lowengard | Freshman | G | | | 1897-01-02 | New York, New York | Irving School |
| | | Norman D. MacLeod (C) | Senior | R |
| | | James F. Maguire Jr. | Sophomore |
| | | Frank D. Ross | Sophomore |
| | | Howard M. Sawyer | Junior | LW |
| | | Kenneth B. Toye | Freshman |
| | | Clifford D. Winton | Freshman | C |

== Standings ==
1913–14 Collegiate ice hockey standings
| | Intercollegiate | | | | | | | Overall | | | | | |
| | GP | W | L | T | PCT. | GF | GA | GP | W | L | T | GF | GA |
|---|---|---|---|---|---|---|---|---|---|---|---|---|---|
| Amherst | – | – | – | – | – | – | – | 6 | 1 | 4 | 1 | – | – |
| Army | 5 | 0 | 5 | 0 | .000 | 8 | 27 | 7 | 1 | 6 | 0 | 21 | 34 |
| Columbia | 3 | 1 | 2 | 0 | .333 | 6 | 18 | 5 | 1 | 4 | 0 | 7 | 29 |
| Cornell | 5 | 1 | 4 | 0 | .200 | 9 | 18 | 5 | 1 | 4 | 0 | 9 | 18 |
| Dartmouth | 7 | 5 | 2 | 0 | .800 | 37 | 14 | 9 | 7 | 2 | 0 | 49 | 18 |
| Harvard | 10 | 7 | 3 | 0 | .700 | 32 | 21 | 16 | 8 | 8 | 0 | 40 | 35 |
| Holy Cross | – | – | – | – | – | – | – | – | – | – | – | – | – |
| Massachusetts Agricultural | 8 | 6 | 2 | 0 | .750 | 40 | 6 | 8 | 6 | 2 | 0 | 40 | 6 |
| MIT | 6 | 2 | 4 | 0 | .333 | 21 | 33 | 8 | 2 | 6 | 0 | 25 | 49 |
| Princeton | 8 | 7 | 1 | 0 | .875 | 33 | 10 | 13 | 10 | 3 | 0 | 54 | 25 |
| Rensselaer | 1 | 0 | 1 | 0 | .000 | 0 | 8 | 1 | 0 | 1 | 0 | 0 | 8 |
| Trinity | – | – | – | – | – | – | – | – | – | – | – | – | – |
| Tufts | – | – | – | – | – | – | – | – | – | – | – | – | – |
| Williams | 7 | 5 | 2 | 0 | .714 | 32 | 19 | 7 | 5 | 2 | 0 | 32 | 19 |
| Yale | 9 | 4 | 5 | 0 | .444 | 25 | 26 | 14 | 6 | 8 | 0 | 34 | 40 |
| YMCA College | – | – | – | – | – | – | – | – | – | – | – | – | – |

== Schedule and results ==
| Date | Opponent | Site | Result | Record |
Regular Season
| December 10 | vs. Pilgrim Athletic Association* | Boston Arena • Boston, Massachusetts | L 4–7 | 0–1–0 |
| December 12 | Tufts* | Boston Arena • Boston, Massachusetts | W 4–2 | 1–1–0 |
| December 17 | vs. Harvard* | Boston Arena • Boston, Massachusetts | L 1–11 | 1–2–0 |
| December 29 | Dartmouth* | Boston Arena • Boston, Massachusetts | L 1–11 | 1–3–0 |
| January 20 | Tufts* | Boston Arena • Boston, Massachusetts | L 3–4 | 1–4–0 |
| February 13 | Columbia* | Boston Arena • Boston, Massachusetts | W 6–2 | 2–4–0 |
| February 21 | at Williams* | Weston Field Rink • Williamstown, Massachusetts | L 1–4 | 2–5–0 |
| February 24 | vs. Boston Athletic Association* | Boston Arena • Boston, Massachusetts | L 0–9 | 2–6–0 |
*Non-conference game.
