= 1921–22 Massachusetts Agricultural Aggies men's ice hockey season =

- Conference: Independent
- Home ice: Alumni Field Rink

Record
- Overall: 6–5–0
- Home: 2–1–0
- Road: 3–4–0
- Neutral: 1–0–0

Coaches and captains
- Head coach: Elton Mansell
- Captain: Herbert Collins

The 1921–22 Massachusetts Agricultural Aggies men's ice hockey season was the 14th season of play for the program. The Aggies were coached by Elton Mansell in his 5th season.

== Season ==
The school got a jump on the ice hockey season by having the rink ready by early November. Though it didn't have ice at the time, there was still an effort to get underway as soon as possible to give the team the best chance to produce a winning season. 20 men showed up for the first meeting but coach Mansell hoped to have as many as 30 by December after the football team had released its players. In the meantime, as many as 16 games were being planned up until mid-February. Aside from the roster turnover, the biggest change the team had to contend with was the abandonment of the rover position as MAC agreed to move towards 6-man hockey.

After returning from the winter break, the Aggies started with a match against one of the top college teams in Dartmouth. "Hubba" Collins kicked off the scoring but the offense was unable to join in. MAC's defense, led by Collins, was able to hold off the Greens for much of the game, however, Dartmouth was slowly able to take over the match. While the Aggies ended up losing the match, they had acquitted themselves well with their strong performance. The Aggie's quality was born out in the next game when they upset Yale on the road. In front of 2,000 Bulldog supporters, Collins was again a terror at both ends, scoring twice in the first 11 minutes of the game. Yale cut into the lead before the period was out but a further goal from Sharky Lyons gave MAC a lead it would not relinquish. The rare defeat of an Ivy League team put the Aggies in the running to be the best of the small teams.

Any pretensions that the team had were curtailed by an embarrassing loss to MIT. Through two periods the Aggies were the better of the two outfits but the team was unable to score. The hard pace caught up with MAC in the third and the tired bunch could do nothing to stem the onslaught from the Engineers. MIT scored six goals in the final frame to turn the match into a farce and send the bewildered Aggies packing. The team rebounded with a win over Amherst but the offense was still subpar. While MAC outshot the Lord Jeffs 51–20, they could only manage one score. Fortunately, Kroeck was equal to the task and posted his first shutout to bring the Aggies back to .500. The low-margin hockey continued against Bates when the team got a second shutout win.

The Aggies took a trip through New York in late January and ended up on the losing side of the ledger. MAC was stymied by a strong Cornell squad who scored thrice in the first 10 minutes of the game. Play evened out afterwards but only Gordon was able to break through for a goal. The following night, the team met Hamilton for their first game at the Russell Sage Rink, the first on-campus indoor facility in the country. The Continentals used the fast ice to their advantage and turned the match into a track meet. MAC was able to keep pace for the first half of the game and even managed to open the scoring on a shot from Hodsdon. Unfortunately, Hodsdon accidentally shot the puck into his own goal and kicked off a deluge from Hamilton. Over a 7-minute span in the third, the home team racked up four more goals and took control of the game. Two quick scores from MAC gave the Aggies a change but penalties to Collins and Lyons in the waning moments ended the comeback attempt. A few days later, MAC fought a pitch battle with Army that saw the Aggies narrowly hold off a determined Cadet squad. Lyons and Collins opened the game with goals in the first 8 minutes but the West Pointers closed the gap before the end of the frame. Army tied the game at the beginning of the second but Collins' second marker gave MAC the lead once more. After a quick goal from Army at the start of the frame, the Aggies picked up the pace in the third and hemmed Army in their own end for much of the period. With less than 2 minutes left, Lyons and Haskins teamed up in a rush down the ice with the former securing the game winner in thrilling fashion.

The following weekend, the team took a trip down to Philadelphia for their first games at the new Ice Palace. Despite their train arriving late, the team was able to win its first game over the St. Nicholas Hockey Club. The team was able to use the clean ice to skate up and down the rink, stunning the onlookers who weren't expecting such an effort from the Aggies. Collins was the star on both sides of the puck and opened the scoring, however, the team found itself down at the start of the third. After Doc Gordon tied the game with a low-angle shot, Shorty Hodsdon got his second goal of the year and put MAC into the lead with just 2 minutes to play. The following night, MAC was back on the ice against another professional outfit and still appeared to be their equals. Neither team managed to score in the first period, despite several attempts by Collins and Lyons. Collins finally got his team on the board midway through the second but the Quakers charged back to tie soon afterwards. Neither team seemed to able to take advantage until Quaker City changed to a 3-man defense that caught MAC off-guard. The home team scored four times in a 6-minute span and handed the Aggies another loss.

The team wrapped up its season with a rematch at Amherst and ended with a second shutout victory. Plimpton, the Sabrinas' goaltender, was the star of the game and kept his team in the match in the face of a withering attack from the Aggies. Eventually, something had to give and a goal from Haskins at the start of the third proved to be the game-winner. After the team's successful season, the financial difficulties of the athletic department came to the fore when the school decide against holding its customary banquet for the players. After an appeal to the student body, a banquet was held for both the ice hockey and basketball teams a month after the season ended.

Francis Tucker served as team manager.

== Roster ==
No.	Nat.	Player	Class	Pos	Height	Weight	DoB	Hometown	Previous team
	(United States)	Herbert L. Collins (C)	Senior	D				Arlington, Massachusetts
	(United States)	Eliot G. Goldsmith	Sophomore	D				Brookline, Massachusetts
	(United States)	Howard R. Gordon	Junior	C/LW				Ipswich, Massachusetts
	(United States)	Philip H. Haskins	Senior	C			1901-06-12	North Amherst, Massachusetts
	(United States)	Marshall S. Hodsdon	Junior	D			1901-12-11	Melrose Highlands, Massachusetts
	(United States)	Julius Kroeck Jr.	Senior	G			1894-06-20	Huntington, New York
	(United States)	Eric F. Lamb	Sophomore	D/F				Waban, Massachusetts
	(United States)	John J. Lyons Jr.	Senior	D/RW			1900-03-31	Arlington, Massachusetts
	(United States)	Arthur C. Nicholl	Sophomore	RW				Quincy, Massachusetts
	(United States)	Holden Whitaker	Junior	C/LW			1900-10-09	Newton Highlands, Massachusetts

== Standings ==
1921–22 Eastern Collegiate ice hockey standings
	Intercollegiate							Overall					
	GP	W	L	T	Pct.	GF	GA	GP	W	L	T	GF	GA
Amherst	10	4	6	0	.400	14	15	10	4	6	0	14	15
Army	7	4	2	1	.643	23	11	9	5	3	1	26	15
Bates	7	3	4	0	.429	17	16	13	8	5	0	44	25
Boston College	3	3	0	0	1.000	16	3	8	4	3	1	23	16
Bowdoin	3	0	2	1	.167	2	4	9	2	6	1	12	18
Clarkson	1	0	1	0	.000	2	12	2	0	2	0	9	20
Colby	4	1	2	1	.375	5	13	7	3	3	1	16	25
Colgate	3	0	3	0	.000	3	14	4	0	4	0	7	24
Columbia	7	3	3	1	.500	21	24	7	3	3	1	21	24
Cornell	5	4	1	0	.800	17	10	5	4	1	0	17	10
Dartmouth	6	4	1	1	.750	10	5	6	4	1	1	10	5
Hamilton	8	7	1	0	.875	45	13	9	7	2	0	51	22
Harvard	6	6	0	0	1.000	33	5	11	8	1	2	51	17
Massachusetts Agricultural	9	5	4	0	.556	16	23	11	6	5	0	20	30
MIT	6	3	3	0	.500	14	18	10	4	6	0	–	–
Pennsylvania	7	2	5	0	.286	16	28	8	3	5	0	23	29
Princeton	7	2	5	0	.286	12	21	10	3	6	1	21	28
Rensselaer	5	0	5	0	.000	2	28	5	0	5	0	2	28
Union	0	0	0	0	–	0	0	6	2	4	0	12	12
Williams	8	3	4	1	.438	27	19	8	3	4	1	27	19
Yale	14	7	7	0	.500	46	39	19	9	10	0	55	54
YMCA College	6	2	4	0	.333	3	21	6	2	4	0	3	21

== Schedule and results ==
Date	Opponent	Site	Result	Record
Regular Season
January 14	Dartmouth*	Alumni Field Rink • Amherst, Massachusetts	L 1–3	0–1–0
January 18	at Yale*	New Haven Arena • New Haven, Connecticut	W 3–2	1–1–0
January 19	at MIT*	Boston Arena • Boston, Massachusetts	L 0–6	1–2–0
January 24	at Amherst*	Pratt Field Rink • Amherst, Massachusetts	W 1–0	2–2–0
January 26	Bates*	Alumni Field Rink • Amherst, Massachusetts	W 2–0	3–2–0
January 27	at Cornell*	Beebe Lake • Ithaca, New York	L 1–4	3–3–0
January 28	at Hamilton*	Russell Sage Rink • Clinton, New York	L 3–5	3–4–0
February 1	at Army*	Stuart Rink • West Point, New York	W 4–3	4–4–0
February 10	vs. St. Nicholas Hockey Club*	Philadelphia Ice Palace • Philadelphia, Pennsylvania	W 3–2	5–4–0
February 11	at Quaker City Hockey Club*	Philadelphia Ice Palace • Philadelphia, Pennsylvania	L 1–5	5–5–0
February 16	at Amherst*	Pratt Field Rink • Amherst, Massachusetts	W 1–0	6–5–0
*Non-conference game.
