= 1913–14 Yale Bulldogs men's ice hockey season =

College ice hockey season

- Conference: 3rd IHL
- Home ice: Yale Arena

Record
- Overall: 6–8–0
- Conference: 1–4–0
- Home: 5–3–0
- Road: 0–3–0
- Neutral: 1–2–0

Coaches and captains
- Head coach: Tom Howard
- Captain: Walter Heron

The 1913–14 Yale Bulldogs men's ice hockey season was the 19th season of play for the program.

== Season ==
After the disastrous run of home cancellations the year before, Yale began making plans to build a permanent ice hockey facility on campus. While the plans got so far as hiring a contractor to begin designing the building, the Bulldogs would still have to use the temporary Yale Arena for the 1913–14 season, which had been improved by the addition of artificial ice.

The Arena was ready for its first practice on January 20 and just four days later, Yale hosted its first game against the St. Nicholas Hockey Club. Work was still being done on the Arena when the Elis welcomed Princeton to New Haven and gave the Tigers all they had. Yale scored first and held the powerful Princeton offence off the scoresheet in the first half, then extended their lead in the second. In the final five minutes Princeton scored twice to tie the game. The two teams agreed to play two 5-minute overtimes and, after Princeton score twice more in the first extra session, Yale began a furious attack but all shots were repelled and the Bulldogs fell 3–5.

Yale lost their next match to Dartmouth, also in double overtime, leaving the team hungry for a win against arch-rival Harvard. Yale was at a disadvantage with the game being in Boston, but the team still battled their foes to a draw after both halves. Once more two overtimes were ordered but it was Harvard who scored in the first and then relied on their oppressive defense to keep the lead, resulting in a 4–3 victory for the Crimson. The rematch was just days later back in New Haven and that time it was Yale's defense that won the day. Both goaltenders were stellar throughout the match but it was Yale's offense that proved superior. The Elis scored three goal to Harvard's one and set up a rubber match at the end of February.

The win over Harvard appeared to buoy the spirits of the team and it rolled off three consecutive wins over the next ten days. The victories sent Yale into their final confrontation with Harvard at the end of the month with pride at stake. With Princeton having already wrapped up the Intercollegiate championship the two teams could focus solely on defeating one another. Harvard got off to a fast start, scoring just 29 seconds into the game. Yale tried to return the favor but the Crimson defense held them back. The Elis managed only one goal in the game while Harvard's four gave them the season series.

Yale was able to tack on a game against Massachusetts Agricultural College to give themselves one official home game before the rematch against Harvard. Yale scored first and led at the half but, similar to the Princeton game, Harvard scored three goals and dominated the period. The Elis closed the gap with less than a minute to play but they could not stop Harvard from claiming the Intercollegiate title.

For the first time since 1901, Yale didn't end their season against Harvard, instead playing one more home game and winning against a local club team.

Thomas Daniels served as team manager.

== Roster ==
No.	Nat.	Player	Class	Pos	Height	Weight	DoB	Hometown	Previous team
		Francis H. Bangs	Junior	LW		151 lb (68 kg)			St. Paul's School
	(United States)	Frederick V. Burgess	Sophomore	LW			1892-09-11	Burlington, Vermont	St. Paul's School
	(United States)	Charles D. Dickey	Sophomore	C		155 lb (70 kg)	1893-12-03	New York, New York	St. Paul's School
		Theodore G. Driscoll	Junior	G		170 lb (77 kg)	1892-10-19		The Hill School
		Merritt W. Gano Jr.	Junior	D		175 lb (79 kg)	1890-05-04		St. Paul's School
		George A. Gore	Graduate	D		163 lb (74 kg)
		Walter S. Heron Jr. (C)	Senior	C/LW		167 lb (76 kg)			St. Paul's School
	(United States)	Marshall R. Herron	Junior	D		150 lb (68 kg)	1891-04-06	Chicago, Illinois	Hotchkiss School
	(United States)	Ranald H. MacDonald Jr.	Junior	RW		148 lb (67 kg)	1891-11-24	Brooklyn, New York	St. Paul's School
		Lucius P. Ordway Jr.	Senior	C		132 lb (60 kg)	1890-12-02		Hotchkiss School
		Morgan B. Schiller	Senior	G		148 lb (67 kg)	1893-07-23		St. Paul's School
	(United States)	Henry Sproul Jr.	Junior	C		135 lb (61 kg)		Pittsburgh, Pennsylvania	St. Paul's School
	(United States)	William H. Sweney	Junior	R		160 lb (73 kg)	1893-05-09	St. Louis, Missouri	Hotchkiss School

== Standings ==
1913–14 Collegiate ice hockey standings
	Intercollegiate							Overall					
	GP	W	L	T	PCT.	GF	GA	GP	W	L	T	GF	GA
Amherst	–	–	–	–	–	–	–	6	1	4	1	–	–
Army	5	0	5	0	.000	8	27	7	1	6	0	21	34
Columbia	3	1	2	0	.333	6	18	5	1	4	0	7	29
Cornell	5	1	4	0	.200	9	18	5	1	4	0	9	18
Dartmouth	7	5	2	0	.800	37	14	9	7	2	0	49	18
Harvard	10	7	3	0	.700	32	21	16	8	8	0	40	35
Holy Cross	–	–	–	–	–	–	–	–	–	–	–	–	–
Massachusetts Agricultural	8	6	2	0	.750	40	6	8	6	2	0	40	6
MIT	6	2	4	0	.333	21	33	8	2	6	0	25	49
Princeton	8	7	1	0	.875	33	10	13	10	3	0	54	25
Rensselaer	1	0	1	0	.000	0	8	1	0	1	0	0	8
Trinity	–	–	–	–	–	–	–	–	–	–	–	–	–
Tufts	–	–	–	–	–	–	–	–	–	–	–	–	–
Williams	7	5	2	0	.714	32	19	7	5	2	0	32	19
Yale	9	4	5	0	.444	25	26	14	6	8	0	34	40
YMCA College	–	–	–	–	–	–	–	–	–	–	–	–	–

1913–14 Intercollegiate Hockey League standings
	Conference								Overall					
	GP	W	L	T	PTS	SW	GF	GA	GP	W	L	T	GF	GA
Princeton *	5	4	1	0	.800	2	17	9	13	10	3	0	54	25
Harvard	6	3	3	0	.500	1	14	16	16	8	8	0	40	35
Yale	5	1	4	0	.200	0	11	21	14	6	8	0	34	40
* indicates conference champion

== Schedule and results ==
Date	Opponent	Site	Result	Record
Regular season
December 20	vs. St. Michael's*	St. Nicholas Rink • New York, New York	L 1–5	0–1–0
December 22	at Syracuse Hockey Club*	Arena Ice Rink • Syracuse, New York	L 0–1	0–2–0
December 23	vs. Cornell*	Arena Ice Rink • Syracuse, New York	W 3–2	1–2–0
January 24	St. Nicholas Hockey Club*	Yale Arena • New Haven, Connecticut	L 1–7	1–3–0
January 28	Princeton	Yale Arena • New Haven, Connecticut	L 3–5 ^{2OT}	1–4–0 (0–1–0)
January 31	vs. Princeton	St. Nicholas Rink • New York, New York	L 1–3	1–5–0 (0–2–0)
February 2	Dartmouth*	Yale Arena • New Haven, Connecticut	L 3–5 ^{2OT}	1–6–0
February 7	at Harvard	Boston Arena • Boston, Massachusetts (Rivalry)	L 3–4 ^{2OT}	1–7–0 (0–3–0)
February 11	Harvard	Yale Arena • New Haven, Connecticut (Rivalry)	W 3–1	2–7–0 (1–3–0)
February 14	Cornell*	Yale Arena • New Haven, Connecticut	W 3–1	3–7–0
February 18	Williams*	Yale Arena • New Haven, Connecticut	W 5–1	4–7–0
February 21	Crescent Athletic Club*	Yale Arena • New Haven, Connecticut	W 4–0	5–7–0
February 28	at Harvard	Boston Arena • Boston, Massachusetts (Rivalry)	L 1–4	5–8–0 (1–4–0)
March 4	New Haven Hockey Club*	Yale Arena • New Haven, Connecticut	W 3–1	6–8–0
*Non-conference game.
