= 1913–14 Princeton Tigers men's ice hockey season =

15th season of play for the Princeton Tigers men's ice hockey team

Intercollegiate Champion Intercollegiate Hockey League, Champion
- Conference: 1st IHL
- Home ice: Lake Carnegie

Record
- Overall: 10–3–0
- Conference: 4–1–0
- Road: 4–2–0
- Neutral: 6–1–0

Coaches and captains
- Head coach: Gus Hornfeck
- Assistant coaches: Clarence Peacock; Cyril Ballin
- Captain(s): Wendel Kuhn; Hobey Baker

The 1913–14 Princeton Tigers men's ice hockey season was the 15th season of play for the program.

== Season ==
With Hobey Baker in his final season of eligibility, Princeton had a good opportunity to reclaim the intercollegiate championship that had eluded them the year before. They continued the best of three series against both Harvard and Yale with the winner likely to be the best team in the nation. Baker, who had been team captain the year before, stepped to the side to allow fellow senior Wendel Kuhn to serve in that capacity though it was clear that Baker was still the best player on the team. Former team members Clarence Peacock and Cyril Ballin returned to serve as assistant coaches for the team.

After several good practices the team opened their season against St. Paul's School, the alma mater of both Baker and Kuhn, and the speedy Baker demonstrated that he hadn't taken a step back with a double hat-trick in the 8–3 win. Over the holiday break the Tigers played defending Canadian champion Toronto, winning the game 5–2 behind Kuhn's 4-goal game. They then took on the Boston Athletic Association, who had already defeated Harvard, and again won, this time by a score of 4–3. Princeton lost Rolland Peacock to a knee injury in the second match but the pair of goals by Kuhn and Baker were enough to give the Tigers the win.

After the break was over Princeton played Ottawa and the Canadian team proved a difficult match. The Gee-Gees played rough against Baker throughout the game and use a good effort to score three times early. Unfortunately, one of those goals was on their own net so when Baker scored the first goal from a Tiger stick he knotted the game at 2–2. The two teams played an extra session to no effect so a second overtime period was required. Both teams were exceedingly tired by this point but despite the fatigue Ottawa was able to score twice to hand Princeton their first loss of the season. The Tigers took their frustration out on their next opponent, Cornell; after allowing the first goal just 18 seconds into the contest Princeton scored the next nine to win in a convincing fashion. Kuhn netted 5 of the goals while Baker and Kilner each had a pair with the former credited with at least three assists. Their second intercollegiate match came a few days later and, despite a valiant effort by Dartmouth goaltender Donohue, Princeton was victorious. The following game against Army ended up being a strange affair. With Kuhn absent, Baker served as team captain but didn't play the entire game. From the start it was apparent that the Tigers were the better team despite missing some of their normal starters. After building a 4–0 lead in a 15-minute half the game was called after only 5 minutes in the second half on account of darkness but even in that short time Baker was substituted for the first time to give Shenstone a bit of game experience at rover.

When Princeton began the championship series with Harvard they had to do so without two of their starters, Kilner and Grant Peacock. The lack of talent and substitutes harmed Princeton's ability to compete and Harvard took full advantage, winning one of the longest games in college hockey history 2–1. The Tigers' next game came at Yale on the Elis' newly completely steel rink. The Bulldogs jumped out to a 3–1 lead but the speed of Hobey Baker, despite playing on dulled skates, allowed Princeton to the tie the game. The team speed of the Tigers kept them on the attack in the extra session with Kuhn scoring twice to salt the game away. The rematch three days later was nearly the opposite as Princeton jumped out to a three-goal lead less than seven minutes into the game and then slumped badly afterwards. Fortunately for the Tigers the Yale offense wasn't up to the task and could only manage a single goal, allowing Princeton to sweep the series despite Baker receiving the only penalty of his collegiate career, a tripping minor.

For the second straight year Princeton entered their rematch with Harvard needing a win to force a third game. Baker was again the star of the game, assisting on Kilner's goal to open the scoring then netting one of his own to tie the match just before the end of the half. Baker's second goal came just past the midway point of the second and put the Tigers ahead for good in a 4–2 win. The final game against Harvard would eventually serve as the championship game and proved to be one of the best performances of the season for Princeton and Baker specifically. While the Tigers star was held without a goal he was instrumental in three of Princeton's tallies and nearly caused a fourth. Kuhn and MacColl each scored twice and the stellar defense provided by Winants and Emmons held Harvard to just a single goal, allowing Princeton to claim the collegiate championship. One week later Princeton made its first trip outside the country when they went to Ottawa to take on the Canadian champion, Ottawa Gee-Gees. The Gee-Gees had given Princeton their first loss of the season and the Tigers were eager to repay them for the favor, and claim an international championship in the process. Both teams proved the measure of one another and an overtime session was required. Just as the first extra period was ending Ottawa managed to find the back of the net and end Princeton's otherwise brilliant season on a sour note.

Hobey Baker led the team in scoring with at least 19 goals and was credited with no less than 13 assists. For his career Baker finished with at minimum 80 goals and 44 assists in 37 games, though it is probable that his true assist total is much higher. Despite that his pace was at least 3 points per game which would place him among the top scorers in the history of college ice hockey.

== Roster ==
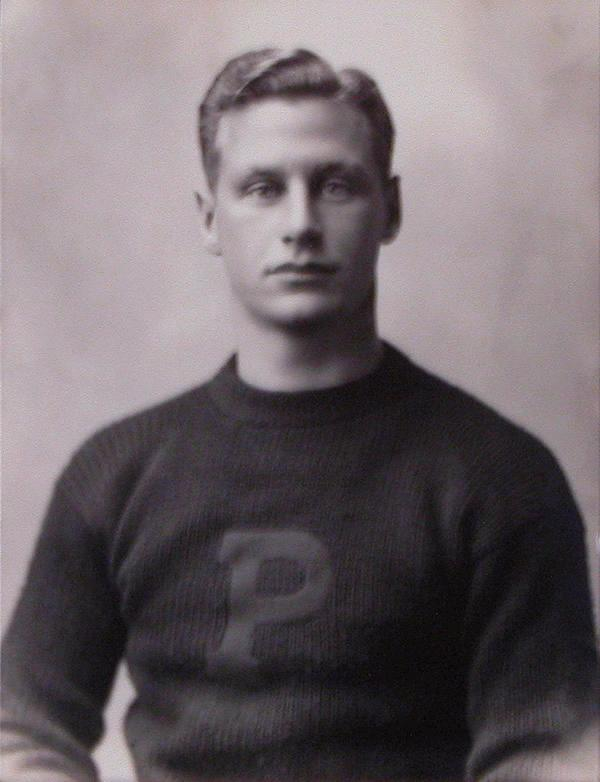
Hobey Baker

No.	Nat.	Player	Class	Pos	Height	Weight	DoB	Hometown	Previous team
	(United States)	Hobey Baker	Senior	R	5' 9" (1.75 m)	161 lb (73 kg)	1892-01-15	Bala Cynwyd, Pennsylvania	St. Paul's School
		Robert Cowan	Sophomore	RW
		Thornton Emmons	Senior	D
		Amory Haskell	Sophomore	D/LW
		Ehrick Kilner	Senior	RW
		Wendel Kuhn (C)	Senior	C					St. Paul's School
		Henry Laughlin	Senior	G
		James MacColl	Senior	F/D
		Grant Peacock	Sophomore	D/LW
		Rolland Peacock	Junior	D/LW
	(Canada)	Allen G. Shenstone	Senior	R/LW			1893-07-27	Toronto, Ontario
		Frank Winants	Senior	G

== Standings ==
1913–14 Collegiate ice hockey standings
	Intercollegiate							Overall					
	GP	W	L	T	PCT.	GF	GA	GP	W	L	T	GF	GA
Amherst	–	–	–	–	–	–	–	6	1	4	1	–	–
Army	5	0	5	0	.000	8	27	7	1	6	0	21	34
Columbia	3	1	2	0	.333	6	18	5	1	4	0	7	29
Cornell	5	1	4	0	.200	9	18	5	1	4	0	9	18
Dartmouth	7	5	2	0	.800	37	14	9	7	2	0	49	18
Harvard	10	7	3	0	.700	32	21	16	8	8	0	40	35
Holy Cross	–	–	–	–	–	–	–	–	–	–	–	–	–
Massachusetts Agricultural	8	6	2	0	.750	40	6	8	6	2	0	40	6
MIT	6	2	4	0	.333	21	33	8	2	6	0	25	49
Princeton	8	7	1	0	.875	33	10	13	10	3	0	54	25
Rensselaer	1	0	1	0	.000	0	8	1	0	1	0	0	8
Trinity	–	–	–	–	–	–	–	–	–	–	–	–	–
Tufts	–	–	–	–	–	–	–	–	–	–	–	–	–
Williams	7	5	2	0	.714	32	19	7	5	2	0	32	19
Yale	9	4	5	0	.444	25	26	14	6	8	0	34	40
YMCA College	–	–	–	–	–	–	–	–	–	–	–	–	–

1913–14 Intercollegiate Hockey League standings
	Conference								Overall					
	GP	W	L	T	PTS	SW	GF	GA	GP	W	L	T	GF	GA
Princeton *	5	4	1	0	.800	2	17	9	13	10	3	0	54	25
Harvard	6	3	3	0	.500	1	14	16	16	8	8	0	40	35
Yale	5	1	4	0	.200	0	11	21	14	6	8	0	34	40
* indicates conference champion

== Schedule and results ==
Date	Opponent	Site	Result	Record
Regular Season
December 18	vs. St. Paul's School*	St. Nicholas Rink • New York, New York	W 8–3	1–0–0
December 31	vs. Toronto*	Boston Arena • Boston, Massachusetts	W 5–2	2–0–0
January 3	at Boston Athletic Association*	Boston Arena • Boston, Massachusetts	W 4–3	3–0–0
January 5	vs. Ottawa*	St. Nicholas Rink • New York, New York	L 2–4 ^{2OT}	3–1–0
January 10	vs. Cornell*	St. Nicholas Rink • New York, New York	W 9–1	4–1–0
January 15	vs. Dartmouth*	Boston Arena • Boston, Massachusetts	W 2–0	5–1–0
January 19	at Army*	Lusk Reservoir • West Point, New York	W 5–0	6–1–0
January 24	at Harvard	Boston Arena • Boston, Massachusetts	L 1–2 ^{2OT}	6–2–0 (0–1–0)
January 28	at Yale	Yale Arena • New Haven, Connecticut	W 5–3 ^{OT}	7–2–0 (1–1–0)
January 31	vs. Yale	St. Nicholas Rink • New York, New York	W 3–1	8–2–0 (2–1–0)
February 14	vs. Harvard	St. Nicholas Rink • New York, New York	W 4–2	9–2–0 (3–1–0)
February 21	vs. Harvard	St. Nicholas Rink • New York, New York	W 4–1	10–2–0 (4–1–0)
February 28	at Ottawa*	Dey's Arena • Ottawa, Ontario	L 2–3 ^{OT}	10–3–0
*Non-conference game.

== Scoring Statistics ==
Name	Position	Games	Goals
Hobey Baker	R	13	19
Wendel Kuhn	C	12	17
Ehrick Kilner	RW	12	8
James MacColl	D/F	11	4
Robert Cowan	LW	6	2
Allen Shenstone	R/LW	2	1
Amory Haskell	D/LW	3	0
Henry Laughlin	G	3	0
Grant Peacock	D/LW	7	0
Rolland Peacock	D/LW	9	0
Thornton Emmons	D	13	0
Frank Winants	G	13	0
Total			†

Note: Assists were not recorded as a statistic.
† The second goal scored by Princeton in their final game was not recorded due to a communication interruption caused by a blizzard.
