= 1913–14 RPI men's ice hockey season =

Hockey season in 1910s

1913-14 RPI men's ice hockey season
- Conference: Independent

Record
- Overall: 0–1–0
- Road: 0–1–0

Coaches and captains
- Captain: Dalton Macken

The 1913–14 RPI men's ice hockey season was the 11th season of play for the program.

== Season ==
Note: Rensselaer's athletic teams were unofficially known as 'Cherry and White' until 1921 when the Engineers moniker debuted for the men's basketball team.

== Roster ==
| No. | Nat. | Player | Class | Pos | Height | Weight | DoB | Hometown | Previous team |
|---|---|---|---|---|---|---|---|---|---|
| | | Dalton Macken (C) |

== Standings ==
1913–14 Collegiate ice hockey standings
| | Intercollegiate | | | | | | | Overall | | | | | |
| | GP | W | L | T | PCT. | GF | GA | GP | W | L | T | GF | GA |
|---|---|---|---|---|---|---|---|---|---|---|---|---|---|
| Amherst | – | – | – | – | – | – | – | 6 | 1 | 4 | 1 | – | – |
| Army | 5 | 0 | 5 | 0 | .000 | 8 | 27 | 7 | 1 | 6 | 0 | 21 | 34 |
| Columbia | 3 | 1 | 2 | 0 | .333 | 6 | 18 | 5 | 1 | 4 | 0 | 7 | 29 |
| Cornell | 5 | 1 | 4 | 0 | .200 | 9 | 18 | 5 | 1 | 4 | 0 | 9 | 18 |
| Dartmouth | 7 | 5 | 2 | 0 | .800 | 37 | 14 | 9 | 7 | 2 | 0 | 49 | 18 |
| Harvard | 10 | 7 | 3 | 0 | .700 | 32 | 21 | 16 | 8 | 8 | 0 | 40 | 35 |
| Holy Cross | – | – | – | – | – | – | – | – | – | – | – | – | – |
| Massachusetts Agricultural | 8 | 6 | 2 | 0 | .750 | 40 | 6 | 8 | 6 | 2 | 0 | 40 | 6 |
| MIT | 6 | 2 | 4 | 0 | .333 | 21 | 33 | 8 | 2 | 6 | 0 | 25 | 49 |
| Princeton | 8 | 7 | 1 | 0 | .875 | 33 | 10 | 13 | 10 | 3 | 0 | 54 | 25 |
| Rensselaer | 1 | 0 | 1 | 0 | .000 | 0 | 8 | 1 | 0 | 1 | 0 | 0 | 8 |
| Trinity | – | – | – | – | – | – | – | – | – | – | – | – | – |
| Tufts | – | – | – | – | – | – | – | – | – | – | – | – | – |
| Williams | 7 | 5 | 2 | 0 | .714 | 32 | 19 | 7 | 5 | 2 | 0 | 32 | 19 |
| Yale | 9 | 4 | 5 | 0 | .444 | 25 | 26 | 14 | 6 | 8 | 0 | 34 | 40 |
| YMCA College | – | – | – | – | – | – | – | – | – | – | – | – | – |

== Schedule and results ==
| Date | Opponent | Site | Result | Record |
Regular Season
| February 7 | at Williams* | Weston Field Rink • Williamstown, Massachusetts | L 0–8 | 0–1–0 |
*Non-conference game.
