= Babe Clark =

American football player (1889–1974)

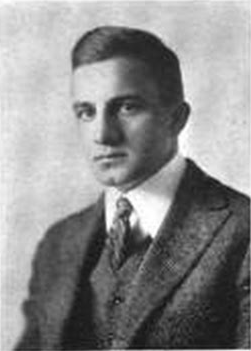
- Clark in the 1914 Cornell Class Book

Profile
- Position: Fullback / Center / Guard

Personal information
- Born: May 7, 1889; Avon, New York, U.S.
- Died: January 10, 1974 (aged 84); Louisville, Kentucky, U.S.
- Listed height: 5 ft 8 in (1.73 m)
- Listed weight: 170 lb (77 kg)

Career information
- High school: Rochester (NY) East
- College: Cornell

Career history
- Rochester Jeffersons (1914–1920)
- Stats at Pro Football Reference

Otho Myron "Babe" Clark (May 7, 1889 – January 10, 1974) was an American football player who played for the Rochester Jeffersons from 1914 to 1920. He played college football at Cornell, where he also participated in hockey and crew. He was a member of the Sphinx Head honor society and the Sigma Nu fraternity while at Cornell.
