= Harriet Cosgrove =

American archaeologist (1887–1970)

Harriet Siliman Cosgrove (1887 – 1970) was an American archaeologist. Her fascination for archeology first started when she moved to Silver City, New Mexico, in 1906 with her husband Cornelius.

In 1919, the Cosgroves bought land in Grant County, New Mexico and began excavating Mimbres Valley ceramics. The Mimbres Valley has pre-Columbian culture dating from 200AD to 1150AD. The Cosgroves reportedly spent their free time exploring the Mimbres Valley with their son, Burton Cosgrove Jr. In the 1920s, the Cosgroves met Alfred Vincent Kidder (1885–1963), at the time curator of North American Archeology at Harvard's Peabody Museum. Kidder was extremely impressed with the Cosgroves' amateur archaeological work on Mimbres culture; the Cosgroves were later hired in 1924 by Harvard University's Peabody museum through the help of Kidder. Harriet was among the first women in the field of archeology to be professionally employed. She then began professionally excavating sites for the Harvard Peabody Museum, beginning with an expedition in the Mimbres Valley.

The Cosgroves' first professional archaeology endeavor was to excavate the Swarts Ruin, also known as the Swarts Ranch Ruin. The Swarts Ruin was part of the Mimbres Valley, however cultural artifacts of this area of the site suggest that the culture was only active between 1000AD – 1150AD in that area. The Swarts excavation established the Cosgroves as elite Southwestern Archaeologists as well as solidifying their image as a team unit. The site was photographically documented by Cornelius and Harriet made ink drawings of every bowl excavated, totaling over 700 Swarts Ruin pots. In total, nearly 10,000 artifacts were found and chronologically recorded by season. Extremely thorough notes were also taken by Harriet pertaining to room locations on the site, dimensions of these rooms, and the floor's soil type; this was done for all burial sites discovered by the Cosgroves. The finds of the site were published in 1932 as "The Swarts Ruin: A Typical Mimbres Site in Southwestern New Mexico" which detailed the findings from 1924–1927 by season. The excavation was deemed "prodigious" and is still used as the primary reference for Mimbres Scholars.

A year prior to the Cosgroves' work at Stalling island they worked on the Gila River site in New Mexico from 1928–1929. After being hired by William Claflin Jr. (an archeologist from Belmont, Massachusetts) the Cosgroves began work on the Stallings island Mound in Columbia County, Georgia. The site however was discovered to not be well preserved due to more recent aboriginal activity. A group of artifacts found at the site were termed the "stallings island culture". The development of this idea of the culture allowed artifacts to be more accurately grouped by age, material, and groups of people. Cornelius discovered fiber-tempered pottery at the site as well as tools of late Archaic-type in great numbers. Through the work of the Cosgroves the Stalling Island Mound was found to be a shell heap rather than a major ceremonial construction like it was previously thought to be. Furthermore, the Cosgroves work at Stalling island was the first stratigraphic analysis of midden in Georgia.

The last site the Cosgroves worked on as a team was the Hopi Pueblo of Awatovi in Arizona. Burton Cosgrove died in 1936 during the first year of the project. Harriet returned to the site in 1937 and was placed in charge of the pottery tent on the site. She worked in training students and Indian assistants in the processes of washing, sorting, and cataloging the artifacts. In 1970 at the age of 84 Harriet Cosgrove died.
