= William Henry Claflin Jr. =

American businessman and archaeologist

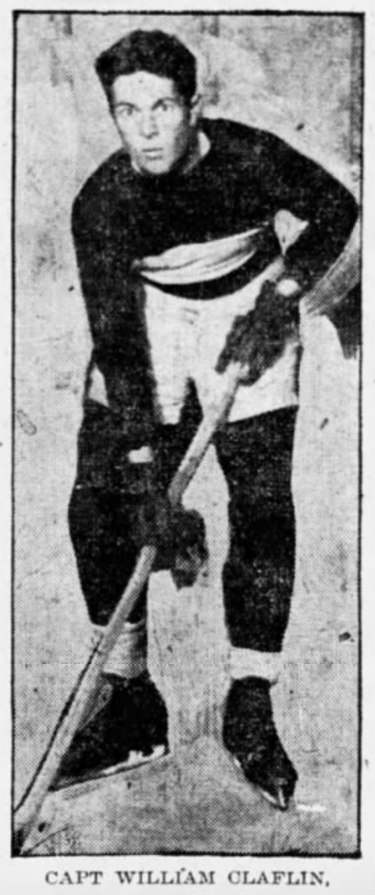
Claflin as an ice hockey player at Harvard University, circa 1914.

William Henry Claflin Jr. (8 June 1893 – 4 March 1982) was a wealthy American businessman and amateur archaeologist. He did archaeological work in Utah and at Stallings Island in Georgia. The Peabody Museum at Harvard University houses a large collection that Claflin collected and donated.

== Biography ==
William (Bill) H. Claflin was born in 1893 in Swampscott, Massachusetts, to William Henry Claflin and Carrie Avery Claflin. Bill Claflin attended Noble and Greenough School for Harvard College, graduating in 1915 with his A.B. In 1917, he married Helen Atkins of Belmont, Massachusetts.

After World War I Clafin served as the head coach for his alma mater's ice hockey team. During his four-year tenure Clafin and George Owen were credited with orchestrating the first line change in an organized game, a maneuver which is still commonplace as of 2020.

Bill Claflin's business achievements include acting as the president of the Boston Stock Exchange (1935–1936), president of the Soledad Sugar Company, treasurer of Harvard College (1938–1948) and director of many companies and banks. Claflin also served as trustee of the Rockefeller Institute and the Museum of Fine Arts in Boston. Claflin was a Resident Member of the Massachusetts Historical Society and Charter Member of the Massachusetts Archaeological Society.

In the late 1920s, Claflin and Raymond Emerson were sent on a pack trip by the Peabody Museum at Harvard University. The Claflin-Emerson Expedition mission was to discover archaeological sites in Utah west and north of the Colorado River. From 1928 to 1931, Claflin and Emerson financed their own research around the Green River, Nine Mile Canyon in Utah and the Fremont River in Utah. Claflin made intermittent trips to Georgia over the years and conducted several minor excavations at Stallings Island and in the middle Savannah River Valley. In 1929, Claflin financed an expedition led by Cornelius Cosgrove and his wife Harriet Cosgrove to Stallings Island in Columbia County, Georgia. Claflin's explorations in the middle Savannah River Valley, Georgia led to the discovery of 140 banner stones, of which 71 are from Stallings Island. Many of the materials collected at Stallings Island and on his southwestern expeditions are housed at the Peabody Museum. In 1932, the Peabody Museum published Claflin's report, "The Stallings Island Mound, Columbia County, Georgia".

An avid explorer, Claflin visited more than 77 countries in his life. He maintained a small archaeological and ethnological museum at his home in Belmont, Massachusetts with more than 34,000 artifacts from his travels and excavations. Claflin died in 1982, at the age of 89, in Belmont.

== Head coaching record ==
Record table
Season	Team	Overall	Conference	Standing	Postseason
Harvard Crimson (Triangular League) (1919–1923)
1919–20	Harvard	10–3–0	4–0–0	1st	Intercollegiate Champion
1920–21	Harvard	8–2–0	3–0–0	1st	Intercollegiate Champion
1921–22	Harvard	8–1–2	4–0–0	1st	East Intercollegiate Champion
1922–23	Harvard	8–4–0	4–2–0	1st	
Harvard:		34–10–2	15–2–0		
Total:		34–10–2			
National champion Postseason invitational champion Conference regular season champion Conference regular season and conference tournament champion Division regular season champion Division regular season and conference tournament champion Conference tournament champion

== See also ==
- Claflin family

== Bibliography ==
- "The Stalling's Island Mound, Columbia County, Georgia". Papers of the Peabody Museum of American Archaeology and Ethnology, Harvard University; Vol. 14, No. 1 (1932).
