= Cornelius Cosgrove =

American archaeologist (1875–1936)

Cornelius Burton "Burt" Cosgrove (1875 – 1936) was an American archaeologist in the Southwestern United States. He was married to Harriet, the other half of the dynamic non-professional Cosgrove archeology unit.

== Background ==
In 1919, the Cosgroves bought land in Grant County, New Mexico, and began excavating the Mimbres Valley ceramics. The Mimbres Valley has pre-Columbian culture dating from AD 150 to 1250. The Cosgroves reportedly spend their free time exploring the Mimbres Valley with their son, Burton Cosgrove Jr. In the 1920s, the Cosgroves meet Alfred Vincent Kidder (1885-1963) who was the curator of North American Archeology at the Peabody Museum at the time. Alfred Kidder was extremely impressed with the Cosgroves' amateur archaeological work on the Mimbres Valley, and because of this, the Cosgroves were later hired in 1924 by the Peabody Museum of Archaeology and Ethnology through the help of Kidder.

== Work in New Mexico ==
The Cosgroves' first professional archaeology endeavor was to excavate the Swarts Ranch Ruin. The Swarts Ranch Ruin was part of the Mimbres Valley, however cultural artifacts of this area of the site suggest that culture was only active between AD 1000–1150 in this area. The Swarts excavation established the Cosgroves as elite Southwestern Archaeologists as well as solidifying their image as a team unit . The site was photographically documented by Cornelius and Harriet who made ink drawings of every bowl excavated, totaling over 700 Swarts Ruin pots. In total, nearly 10,000 artifacts were found and chronologically recorded by season. Extremely thorough notes were also taken by Harriet pertaining to room locations on the site, dimensions of these rooms, and the floor's soil type; this was done for all burial sites discovered by the Cosgroves. The finds of the site were published in 1932 as "The Swarts Ruin: A Typical Mimbres Site in Southwestern New Mexico" which detailed the findings from 1924 to 1927 by season. The excavation was deemed "prodigious" and is still used as the primary reference for Mimbres Scholars.

A year prior to the Cosgroves' work at Stallings Island, they worked on the Gila River site in New Mexico from 1928 to 1929. With his wife Harriet, he began excavating sites for the Harvard Peabody Museum, beginning with an expedition in the Mimbres River Valley.

== Work in Georgia ==
In 1929, he and his wife were hired by William Claflin Jr. to work on the Stallings Island site in Columbia County, Georgia. The Cosgroves discovered that the site was not well preserved due to more recent aboriginal activity. A group of artifacts found at the site were termed the "Stallings Island culture". The development of this idea of the culture allowed artifacts to be more accurately grouped by age, material, and groups of people. Cornelius discovered fiber-tempered pottery at the site as well as tools of late Archaic-type in great numbers. Through the work of the Cosgroves the Stallings Island mound was found to be a shell heap rather than a major ceremonial construction like it was previously thought to be. The work was the first stratigraphic analysis of midden in Georgia.

== Death ==
The last site the Cosgroves worked on as a team was the Hopi Pueblo of Awatovi in Arizona. Burton Cosgrove died in 1936 during the first year of the project.
