= Heldner =

Heldner is a surname. Notable people with the surname include:

- Collette Pope Heldner (1902–1990), American painter
- Fabian Heldner (born 1996), Swiss ice hockey player
- Knute Heldner (1875–1952), Swedish-American artist

== See also ==
- Hélder
- Hellner
