= Hellner =

Hellner is a surname. Notable people with the surname include:

- Jacob Hellner (born 1961), Swedish music producer
- Johannes Hellner (1866–1947), Swedish politician
- Marcus Hellner (born 1985), Swedish cross country skier
- Nils Hellner (born 1965), German archaeologist
