= Sweet Martha's Cookies =

Cookie vendor at the Minnesota State Fair

- Sweet Martha's Cookie Jar
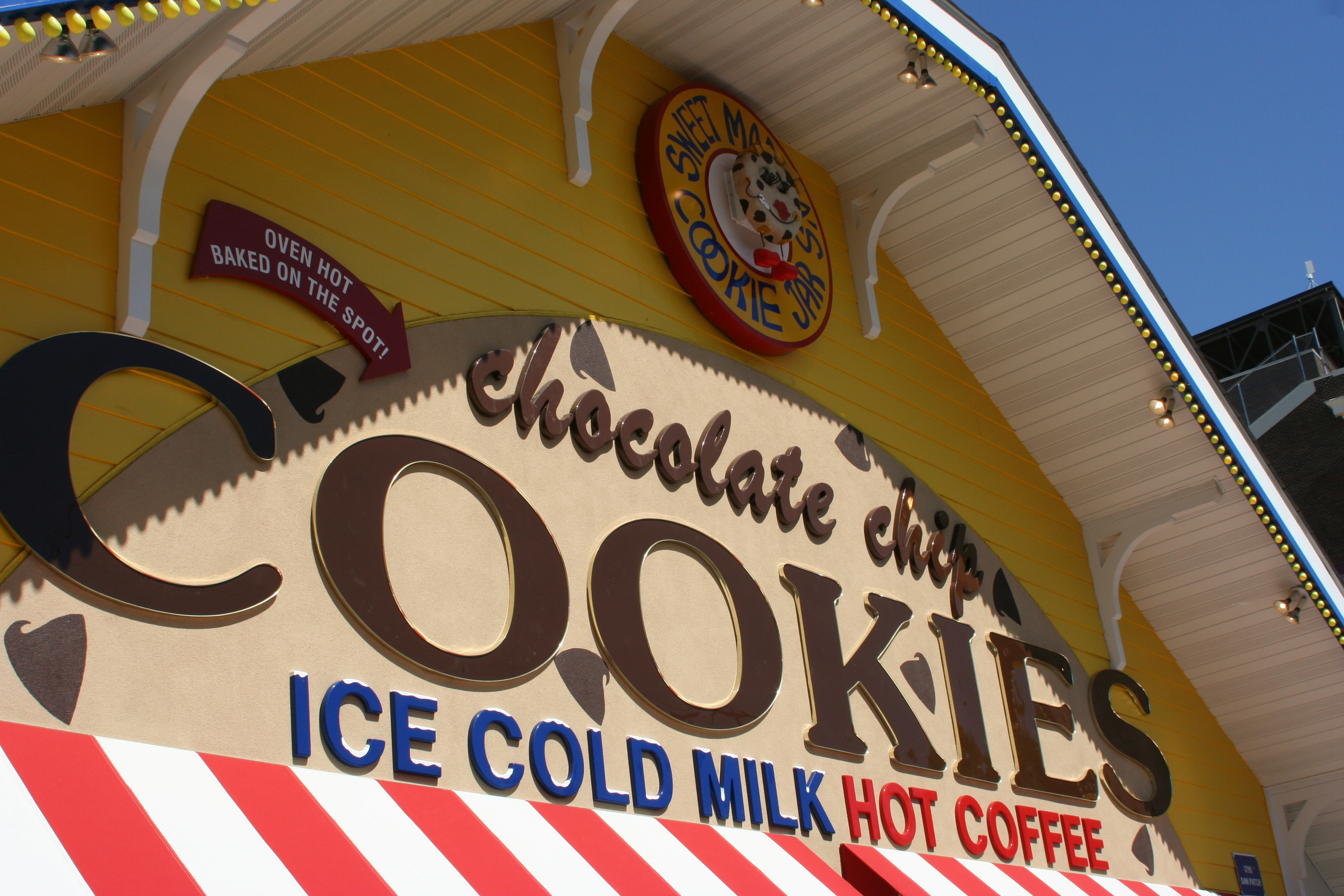
- Named after: Martha Rossini Olson
- Established: 1979; 47 years ago
- Founders: Martha Rossini Olson; Gary Olson; Brenda O'Leary; Neil O'Leary
- Revenue: $4.6 million (2023)
- Website: sweetmarthas.com

Sweet Martha's Cookie Jar, also known as Sweet Martha's Cookies or simply Sweet Martha's, is a vendor at the Minnesota State Fair known for selling heaping buckets of cookies. Founded in 1979, they grew to the largest vendor at the Minnesota State Fair, capable of baking some 3 million cookies per day and bringing in $4.6 million in revenue across the 12 days of the fair in 2023.

Martha Rossini Olson and her husband Gary founded a frozen yogurt shop called "Sweet Martha's" in downtown Minneapolis in 1978. They applied to be a vendor at the Minnesota State Fair the following year, but were denied as the fair already had a yogurt stand; however, three weeks before the fair, they received permission to start a cookie booth. Founded jointly by Martha, her husband, and friends Neil and Brenda O'Leary, it originally operated out of a small 9-foot by 11-foot stand. Three years later, they opened a permanent location.

In 1991, Sweet Martha's moved into the former location of Adeline's Scandinavian Kitchen; this became their main booth, and currently their oldest. A booth next to the grandstand opened in 1994, and was expanded in 2003. A third booth on the north end of the fair was announced in 2016 and opened in 2018.

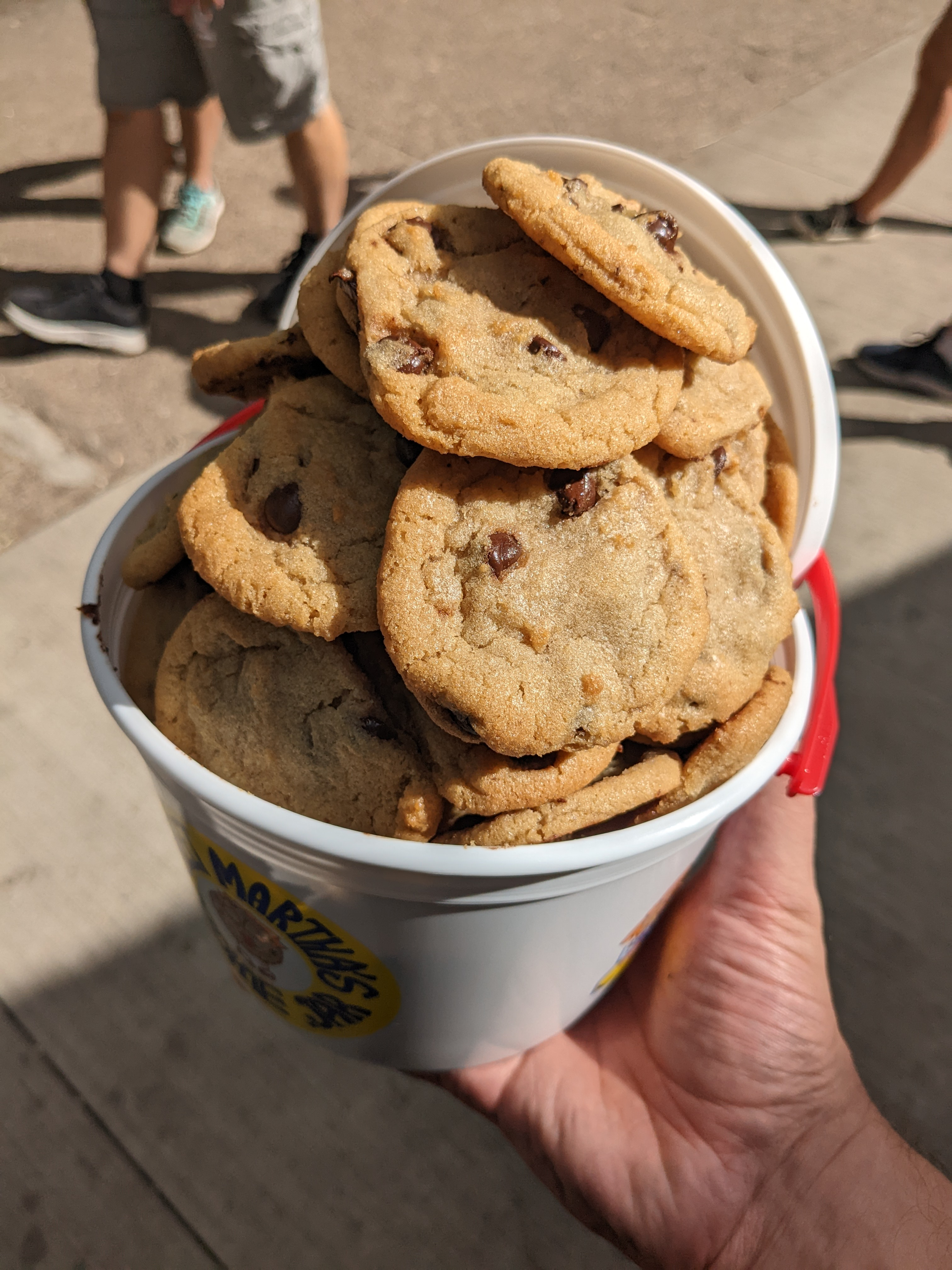
A typical bucket of cookies

Sweet Martha's has the capacity to bake 44,000 cookies every 12 minutes, making on average 1 million cookies each day, but up to three million cookies on busier days. They are served in a bucket, originally introduced in around 1986. Cookies are given out either in paper cones or in plastic buckets. Stacked high, cookies often fall out. Sweet Martha's is the top-selling vendor at the fair. In 2019, the booth brought in $5 million in revenue through the twelve-day fair. In 2023, it was $4.6 million.

In 1998, Sweet Martha's attempted to enter the frozen cookie dough market, selling their product in around 80 supermarkets around the Twin Cities; in 2020, the frozen cookie dough returned to grocery store shelves.
