= Stan Herd =

American crop artist and painter (born 1950)

Stan Herd (born 1950 in Protection, Kansas) is an American crop artist and painter who creates images, or earthworks, on large areas of land, especially in Kansas. His work is sometimes called living sculpture. He plots his designs and then executes them by planting, mowing, and sometimes burning, or plowing the land. He is associated with the Prairie Renaissance Movement.

Two of Herd's first Kansas installations were the 160-acre (0.65 km^{2}) portraits of Kiowa War Chief Satanta (1981) and Will Rogers (1983). These artworks can be seen in Herd's 1994 book on crop art. Herd's website includes photos of his work and a list of some of the media coverage of his various projects, including an article in Smithsonian magazine and National Geographic's World magazine (1988).

An installation Herd completed in 1994, Countryside, which was an image of a pastoral Kansas landscape on an acre of property owned by Donald Trump in New York City, was the subject of an independent film by Chris Ordal called Earthwork. The drama stars Oscar-nominated actor John Hawkes as Herd. The film's Kansas premiere, in Herd's adopted hometown of Lawrence, took place September 10, 2010, at the Lawrence Arts Center. Earthwork won awards at more than 50 film festivals in the United States alone. Filmed on location in Lawrence and New York City, it tells the true story of Herd's transformation of a large, trash-strewn, barren lot near a graffiti-laced underground railway tunnel inhabited with the homeless, into Countryside.

Herd made several trips to Havana to create Rosa Blanca in 2001, an image of a white rose in honor of the 19th-century Cuban poet José Martí. In 2008, Herd partnered with Papa John's pizza to create a crop circle in a wheat field outside Denver airport to celebrate the company's launch of whole wheat crust pizza. The effort won numerous awards.

Herd's work has been seen on CBS Sunday Morning; Fox Television's Breakfast Time; Dateline NBC; CNN News; ABC's Good Morning America; and National Public Radio's All Things Considered.
