= Crop art =

Environmental art using plant matter

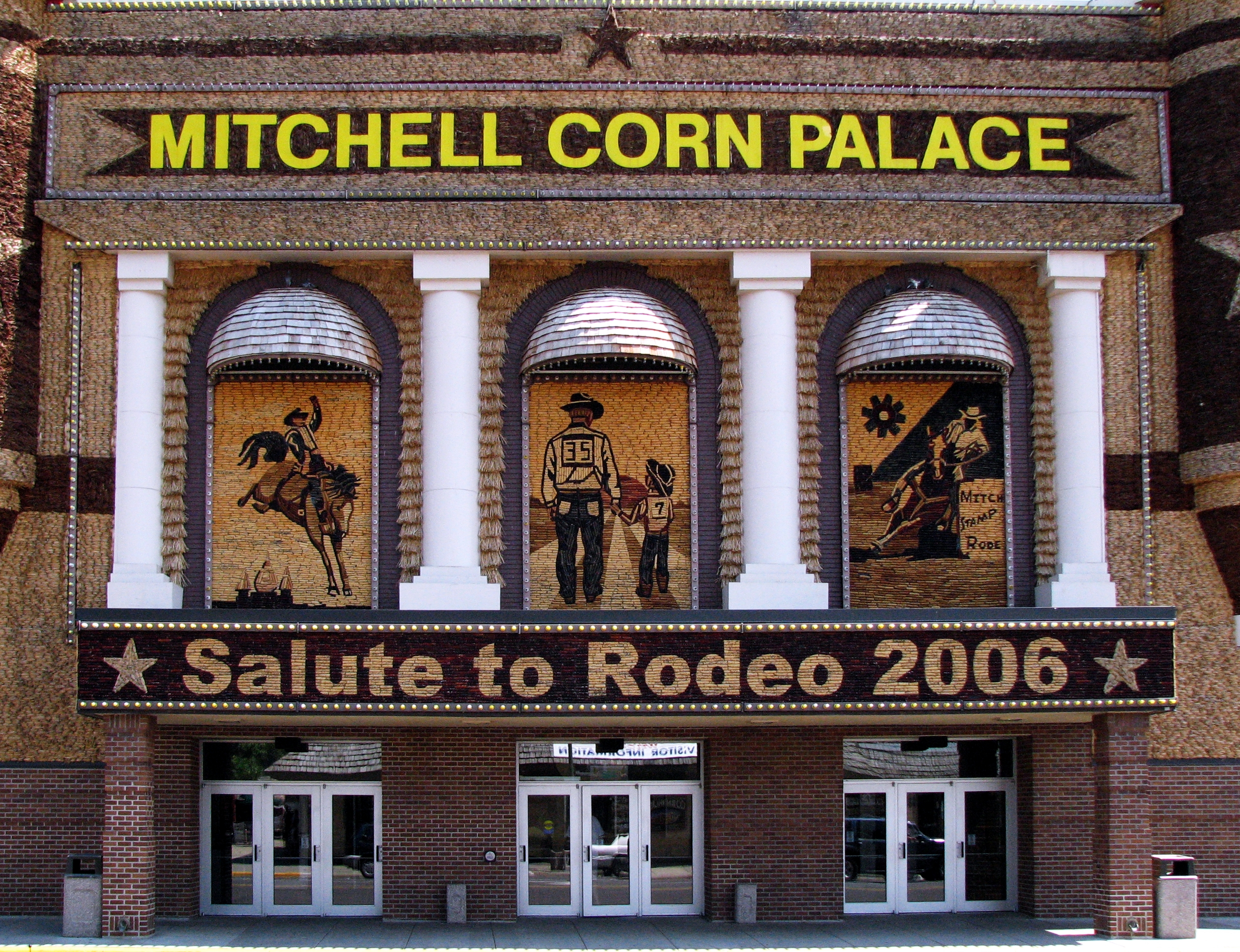
The Corn Palace (detail of panel), Mitchell, South Dakota

Crop art is an environmental art practice using plants and seeds in the landscape to create statements, marks and/or images. Agnes Denes, Matthew Moore (artist), Dennis Oppenheim and Stan Herd are practitioners of Crop art. Some works of Land art, and Earth art are similar in scale, and can be seen only from aerial viewpoints.

== Seed Art ==
Linda Paulsen demonstrates making seed art at the Minnesota State Fair

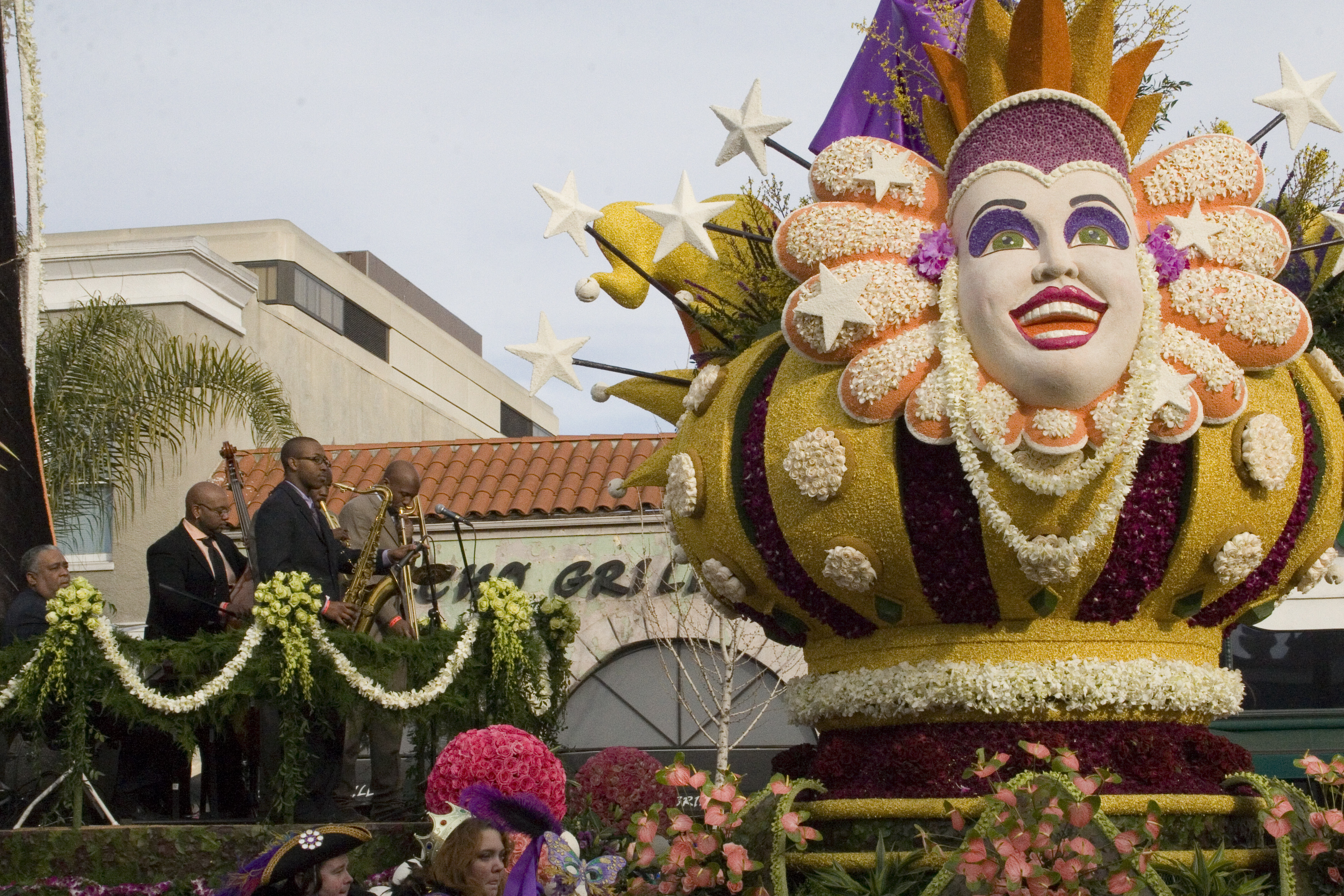
Tournament of Roses parade, New Orleans float

One folk art version of crop art is called seed art, a visual art form created in mosaic-style, similar to the technique of pointillism in painting, or needlepoint textiles. Seed mosaic images are created by fixing vegetable matter, especially seeds, to a background. Coleen Sheehy, in Seed Queen quotes a classic text on the subject: Decorating with Seed mosaics, Chipped Glass and Plant materials (first pub.1960) by Elenor Van Rennslaer "...mosaics are tiles, glass, or stones set in mortar. Instead of these you can create a different kind of mosaic using such plant materials as seeds, tiny pods, and flowers" (Sheehy 49).

=== Sioux City Corn Palaces ===
One prominent example of seed art is corn palaces. Originating in Sioux City, Iowa in 1887, corn palaces have been a part of American culture for over a hundred years. The first corn palace ever built took roughly 240 people to build and decorate, and it was decorated with imagery of gods such as Mondamin, Demeter, and Ceres. The palace was open for observation from October 3rd, 1887, to October 8th, 1887. Because of the success of the first palace, the people of Sioux City constructed 4 more palaces over the next 4 years, spanning until 1891.

=== Mitchell Corn Palace ===
After the corn palaces of Sioux City came the Corn Palace of Mitchell, South Dakota, which was first built for the 1892 Corn Exposition. Outer walls of the building were -and still are- covered in murals made from multi-colored ears of corn (Sheehy 24). Oscar Howe, a Native American artist from the Crow Creek Indian Reservation, designed the annual murals of the Mitchell Corn Palace from 1948 to 1971. Howe's murals were designed in his own unique art style which is described as "modern Indian art".

=== Minnesota State Fair ===
Seed art is also prominent in the Minnesota State Fair. The early editions of this fair were funded by wealthy locals who wanted to advertise their land to people from other states. Seed art was used to do this because it demonstrated that there was an excess of food within the state. In more modern times, the seed mosaic portraits by Lillian Colton are examples of seed art at the fair. Her seed portraits of celebrities were exhibited in the strictly defined "Crop art" category at the Minnesota State Fair beginning in 1966. Rules for entry of Crop art allow "only seeds from Minnesota-grown farm crops or cultivated garden flowers, fruits, and vegetables" with no wild plant seeds permitted. Colton continued to teach and make Crop art until her death at age 97 in 2007 (Sheehy 2).

=== Modern Day ===
A new generation of Crop, or Seed artists, known as the "Postmodern School of Minnesota Crop Art" (Sheehy 90) is continuing this folk tradition. Some of these artists are "Cathy Camper, Alan Carpenter, Kim Cope, Linda Koutsky, Nancy Loung, Suzy Mears, Laura Melnick, and David Steinlicht" (Sheehy 90). There is a custodial aspect and preservation ethic associated with this plant-based art form. Making Crop art is not only a way preserving and rejuvenating a craft, but its practice foregrounds the need to collect, store, and value the lore and varieties of seeds. In Los Angeles, the Tournament of Roses Parade floats employ the flowers of plants in a similar collage or mosaic style.

== Crop circles ==
The term crop art might be used to describe formations known as crop circles. Crop circles first came to mass media attention during the 1980s after they were noticed in some agricultural fields in southern England (Ency Rel/Spir). Most often the images consist of very large and intricate series of rings and lines formed when standing crops, such as wheat and rye are flattened into patterns. Some attribute these designs to the marks left by landings of extraterrestrial craft because the images are usually very large, appear over a short period of time, and some do not show any visible tracks into or out of the design. These same type of figures are found all over the world; though many do not attribute their manifestation to visitations by alien beings. Crop circles are sometimes called crop formations, agroglyphs, or pictograms. Some are also created by recognized "landscape artists" for commercial purposes.

== See also ==
- Seed Savers Exchange
