= Minnesota State Fair =

Annual event in Falcon Heights, Minnesota, U.S.

Coordinates: 44°58′52″N 93°10′5″W

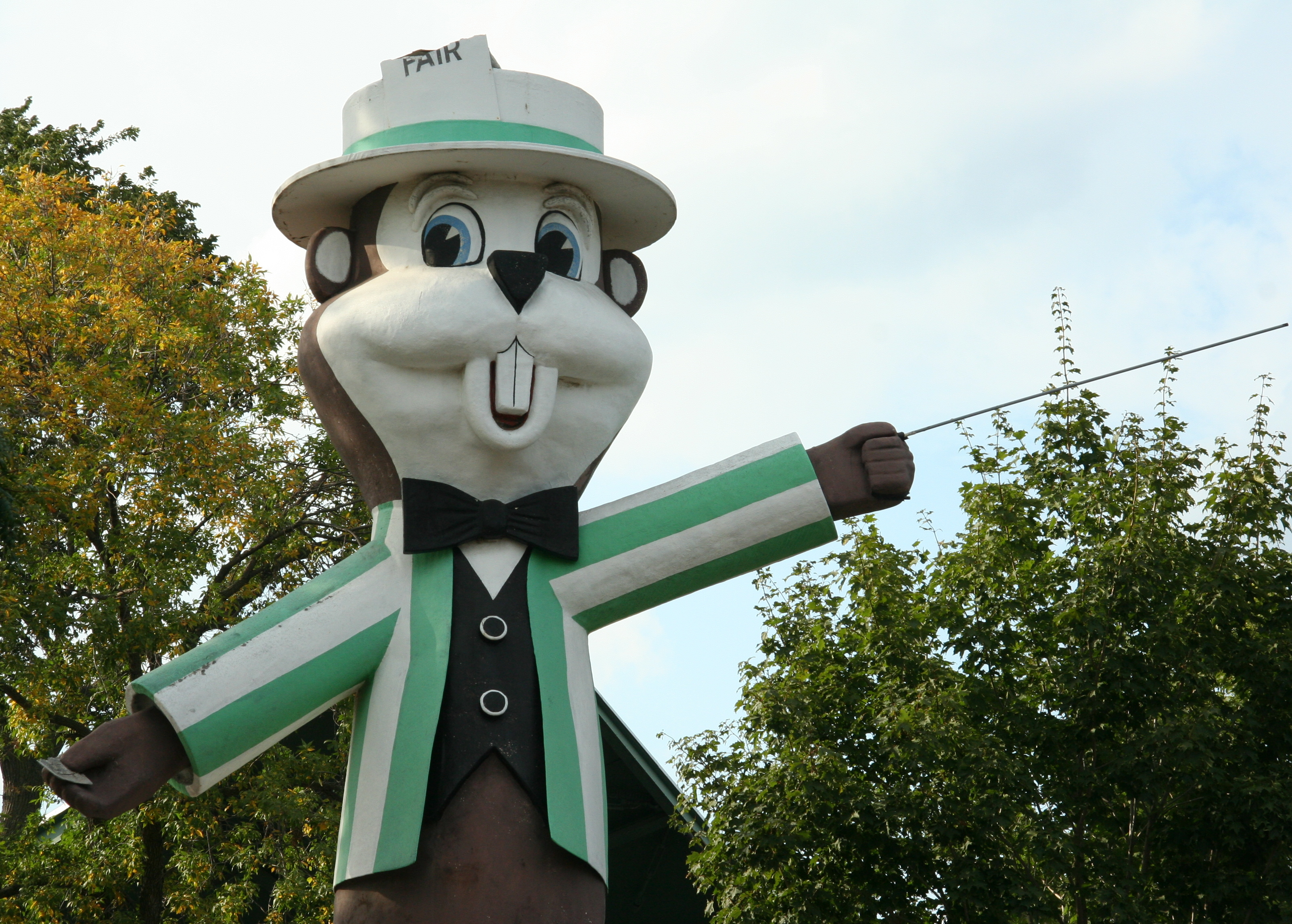
- 'Fairchild' the State Fair Gopher greets fairgoers
- Genre: State fair
- Dates: 12 days before and including Labor Day
- Location: Falcon Heights, Minnesota
- Years active: 1859–present (excluding 1861, 1862, 1893, 1945, 1946, 2020)
- Next event: August 26 – September 6, 2027
- Attendance: 1,940,869 (2025); 2,126,551 (2019, record)
- Website: www.mnstatefair.org

The Minnesota State Fair is a state fair held annually in the U.S. state of Minnesota. Also known by its slogan "The Great Minnesota Get-Together", it is the largest state fair in the United States by average daily attendance and the second-largest by total attendance, trailing only the State Fair of Texas, which generally runs twice as long as the Minnesota State Fair. The state fairgrounds are in Falcon Heights, Minnesota, midway between the state capital of Saint Paul and Minneapolis, and adjacent to the Saint Paul campus of the University of Minnesota. The fair runs for twelve days from late August into early September, ending on Labor Day.

Residents of the state and region come to the fair to be entertained, exhibit their best livestock, show off their abilities in a variety of activities including art and cooking, learn about new products and services, and eat many different types of food. Around two million people attend the fair annually. The highest annual attendance record is 2,126,551 people in 2019, with the highest daily attendance being 270,426 visitors on the second Saturday of the 2018 fair. The Minnesota State Fair was named the best state fair in the United States in 2015, 2025 and 2026 by readers of USA Today.

== History ==
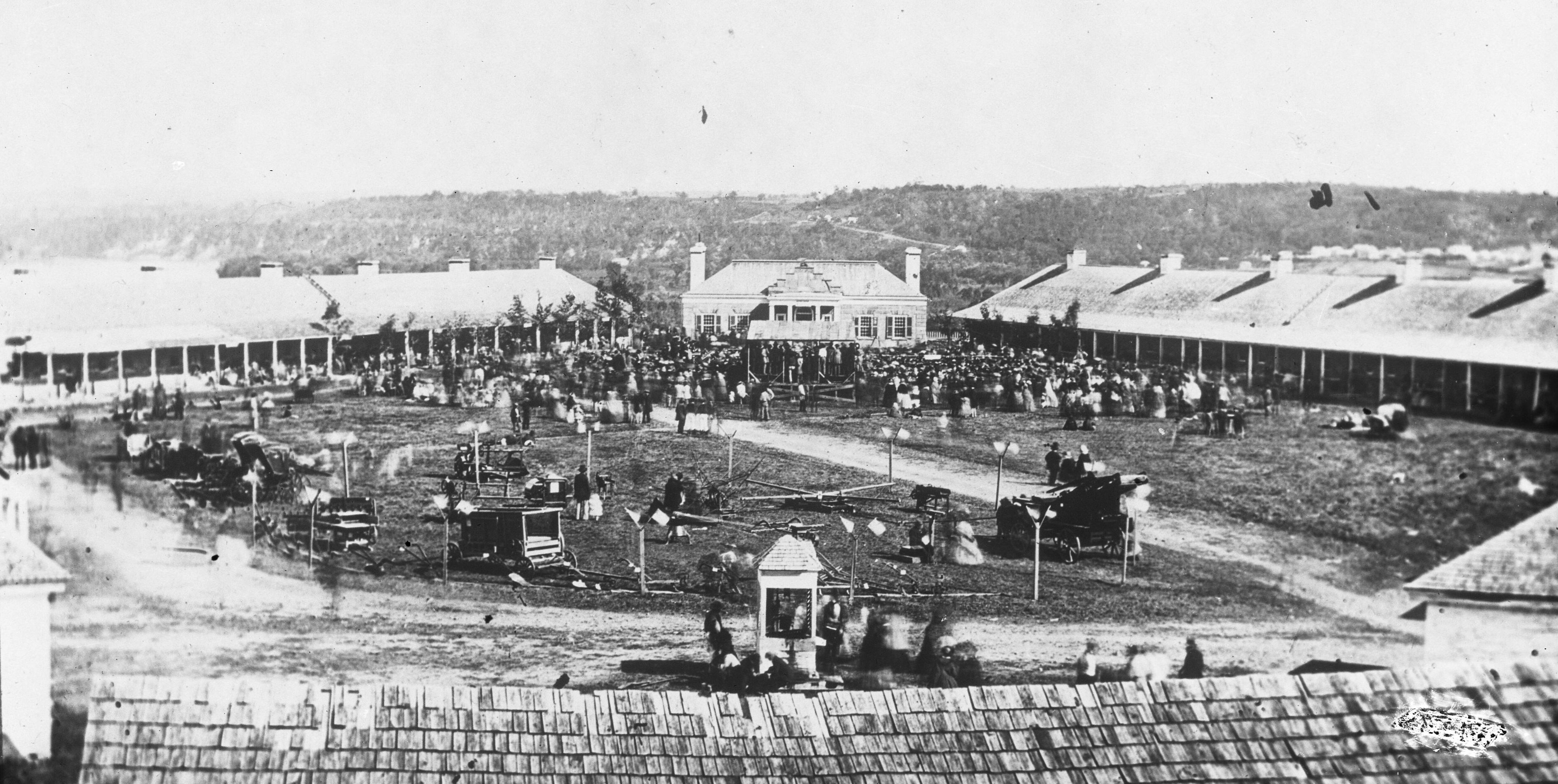
First Minnesota State Fair, held at Fort Snelling in 1860

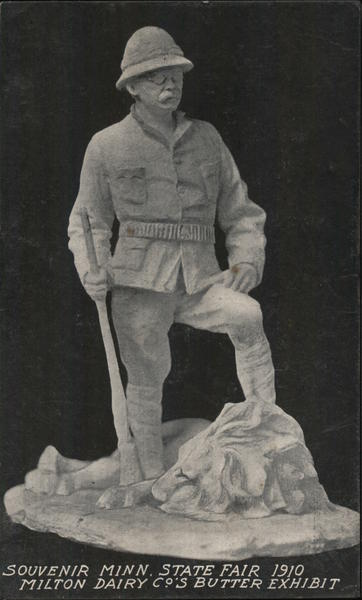
Sculptor John Karl Daniels created a life-size butter sculpture of Theodore Roosevelt for the 1910 fair.

The Minnesota Territory first held a Territorial Fair in 1854, although the first Minnesota State Fair did not occur until 1859, the year after Minnesota gained statehood. In its early years during the 19th century, the fair was held in many different locations. Some were not far from the current site, but others were held in more distant parts of Minnesota, including Rochester, Owatonna, and Winona. For a time in the 1870s, the Twin Cities of Minneapolis and St. Paul held competing fairs. Minneapolis, the younger city of the pair, eventually outdid its neighbor by staging the larger fair with the help of businessman William S. King.

In 1884, a committee was put together by the Minnesota State Agricultural Society to select a permanent site. One site that was considered was an area around Minnehaha Falls, but the final site chosen was the Ramsey County Poor Farm, which remains the fair's current site. It was a politically neutral site, being about halfway between Minneapolis and St. Paul. The fair first opened its doors there on September 7, 1885. The fairgrounds were 210 acres (85 ha) at the time, but now cover 322 acres (130 ha). The fair ran six days from 1885 to 1918, eight days from 1919 to 1938, ten days from 1939 to 1971, and 11 days from 1972 to 1974. It has been 12 days long since 1975.

One of the first annual events to occur is the creation of a butter sculpture. Each year, a new Princess Kay of the Milky Way is selected to promote Minnesota's dairy industry. Part of the job involves posing for several hours in a walk-in, glass-walled refrigerator as a 90-pound (41 kg) block of butter is carved into a head with her likeness. Butter makers started sculpting their products at the fair as far back as 1898, although the head-sculpting tradition did not begin until 1964.

The main entrance to the fair from Snelling Avenue heads onto a road named Dan Patch Avenue for a pacer horse who won every race he ran in from 1900 until his retirement in 1909.

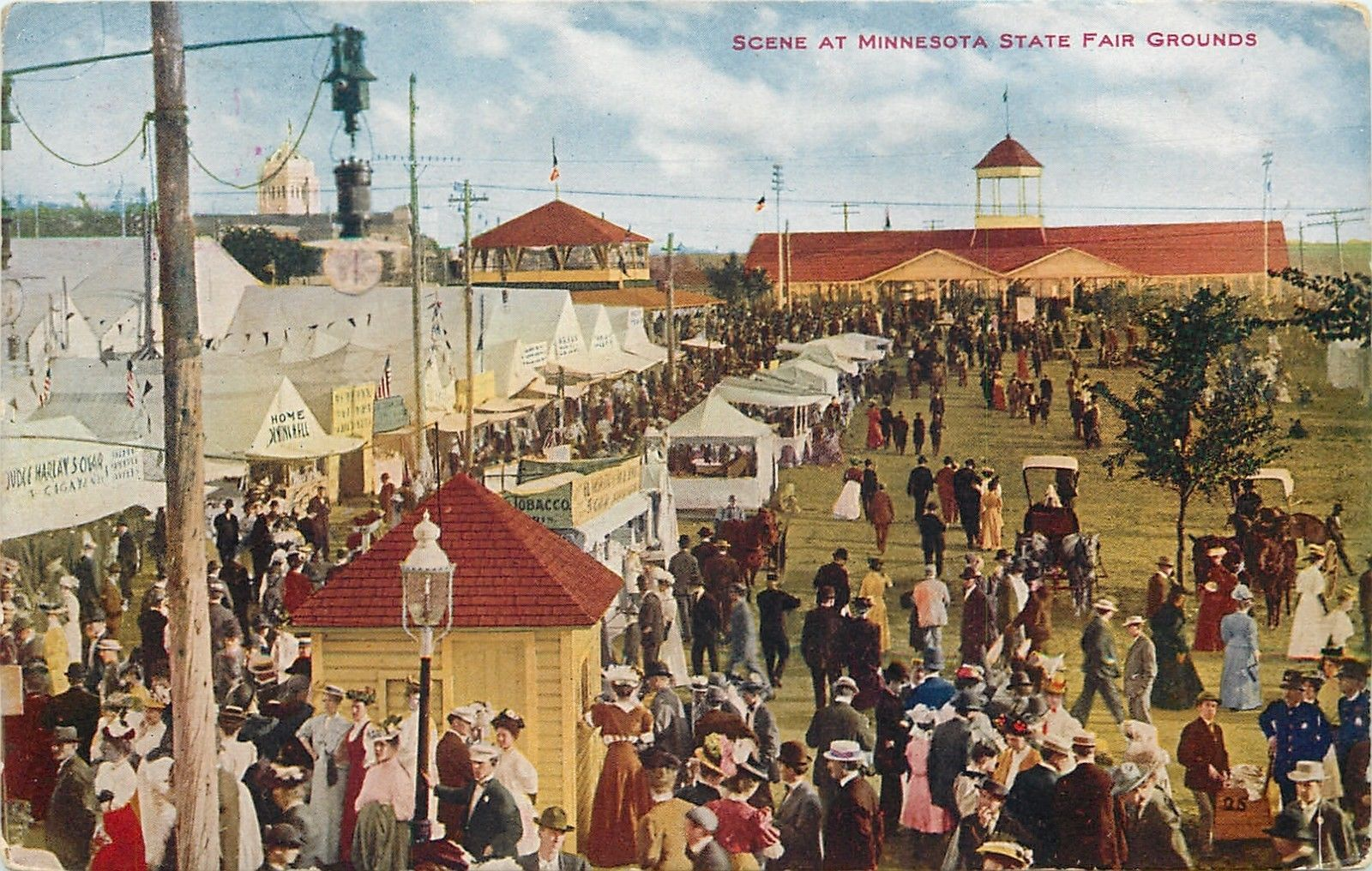
1910 Minnesota State Fair postcard

In 1898 the Spanish–American War broke out. The states were requested to provide volunteers and Minnesota quickly had enough to form four Regiments. They were initially numbered 1–4, but GAR veterans felt that they should continue the numbering used during the Civil War, so they became the 12th–15th Minnesota Infantry Regiments. All four were mustered and organized on the State Fair Grounds. Camp Ramsey on Machinery Hill was the encampment site.

One of the most significant dates in the fair's history was September 2, 1901, when then–Vice President Theodore Roosevelt visited and famously quipped, "Speak softly and carry a big stick." Roosevelt became president 12 days later, after William McKinley was assassinated.

By 1967, annual attendance figures had reached well over a million people and the record day that year was about 197,000 visitors. By 2016, attendance neared two million and the record day was about a quarter-million people. The all-time attendance record of 2,126,551 was set in 2019, along with the all-time single-day attendance record of 270,426 in 2018 on the second Saturday.

=== Cancellations ===
Since 1859, the fair has been held annually except for six different years. In 1861 and 1862, the fair was not held due to the ongoing American Civil War and the Dakota War of 1862. Scheduling issues between the fair and the World's Columbian Exposition in Chicago, Illinois, caused the 1893 fair to be cancelled. The fair was also not held in 1945, as fuel was in short supply as a result of World War II, and it was cancelled again in 1946 because of an outbreak of polio.

The fair was most recently cancelled in 2020 due to the COVID-19 pandemic, with the decision announced on May 22, 2020. Fair manager Jerry Hammer had previously stated that the 2020 fair would not be a postponed or scaled-back event; it would either run unchanged or be cancelled entirely. Of the decision to cancel, Hammer stated "this is the time of year when things really need to take off, and we can't do it. There's not time." Instead, a food parade featuring several well-known State Fair vendors was held on several dates in October.

To make up for 2020's cancellation, the fair management hosted its first-ever spring event, entitled "Kickoff To Summer", the following year, featuring scaled-back concessions and attractions. It also served as a test to the fair's eventual return in 2021. The "Kickoff to Summer" event returned in 2022 after positive reception in 2021.

== Attractions ==
=== Livestock ===
A large portion of the Fairgrounds are occupied by livestock barns where various farm animals are displayed. The animals and their owners take part in livestock shows to compete for awards. Most of the shows take place in the Lee & Rose Warner Coliseum, a large indoor arena on the fairgrounds. The Coliseum was completed for use in the 1951 fair, replacing the Hippodrome, which had been rendered structurally unsound by its use as a Propeller Plant by the A. O. Smith Corporation during World War II and razed in 1946. Open-class livestock competitions are held in horses, beef cattle, dairy cattle, swine, sheep, dairy goats, llamas, poultry (chickens, ducks, geese, turkeys, pigeons), rabbits, and stock dogs. On August 31, 2007, a bull escaped from its handler and charged several fairgoers before fatally injuring itself by charging a fire hydrant. No people were seriously injured in the mishap.

=== Food ===
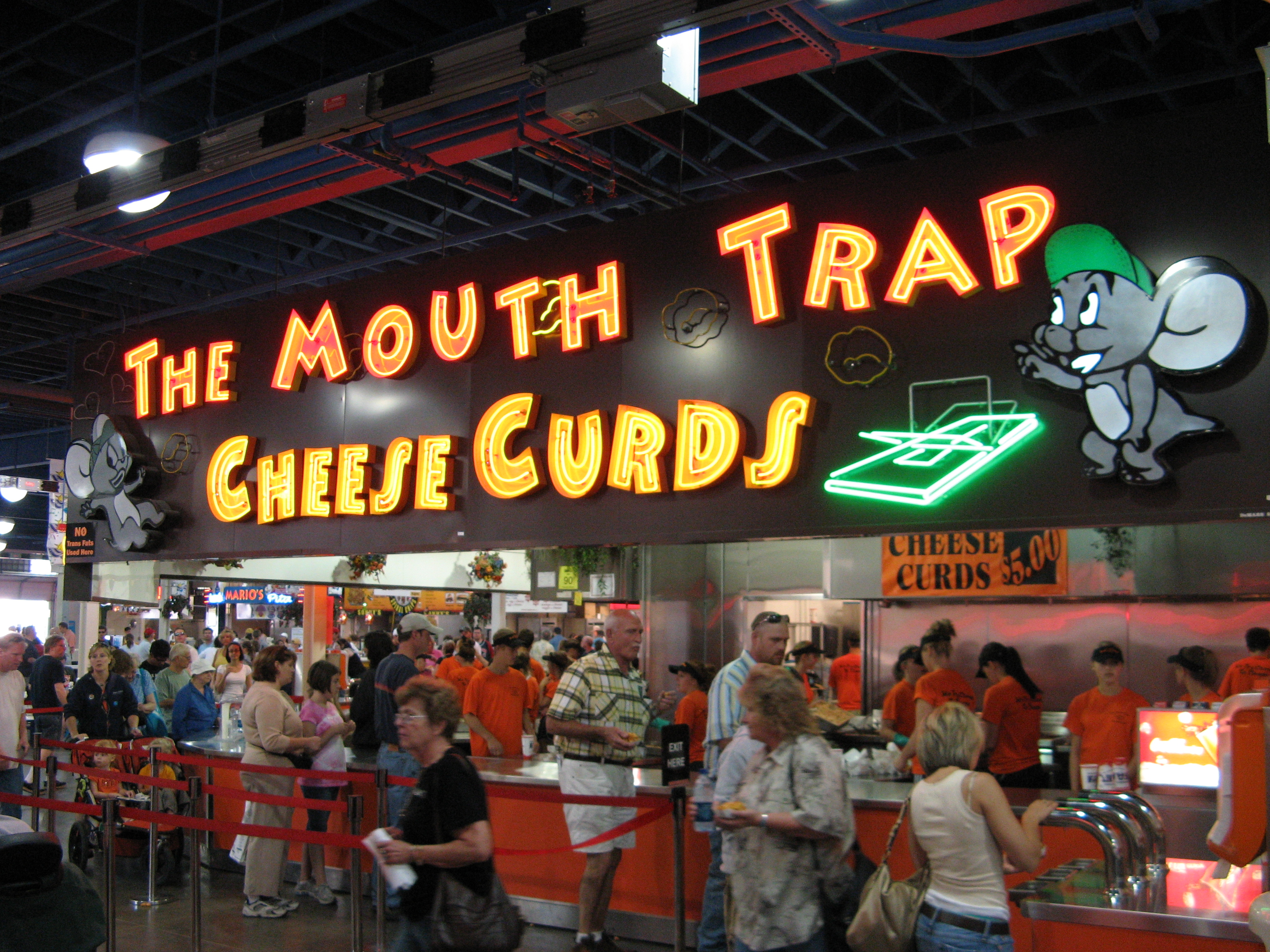
A stand selling cheese curds

Foods served at the annual Minnesota State Fair have traditionally included watermelon, pickles, baked beans, buffalo burgers, deep-fried cheese curds, cotton candy, glazed ham, Australian battered potatoes, chimichangas, and homemade apple pie. Some foods reflect Minnesota's agriculture, including cheese curds, milkshakes, and corn dogs.

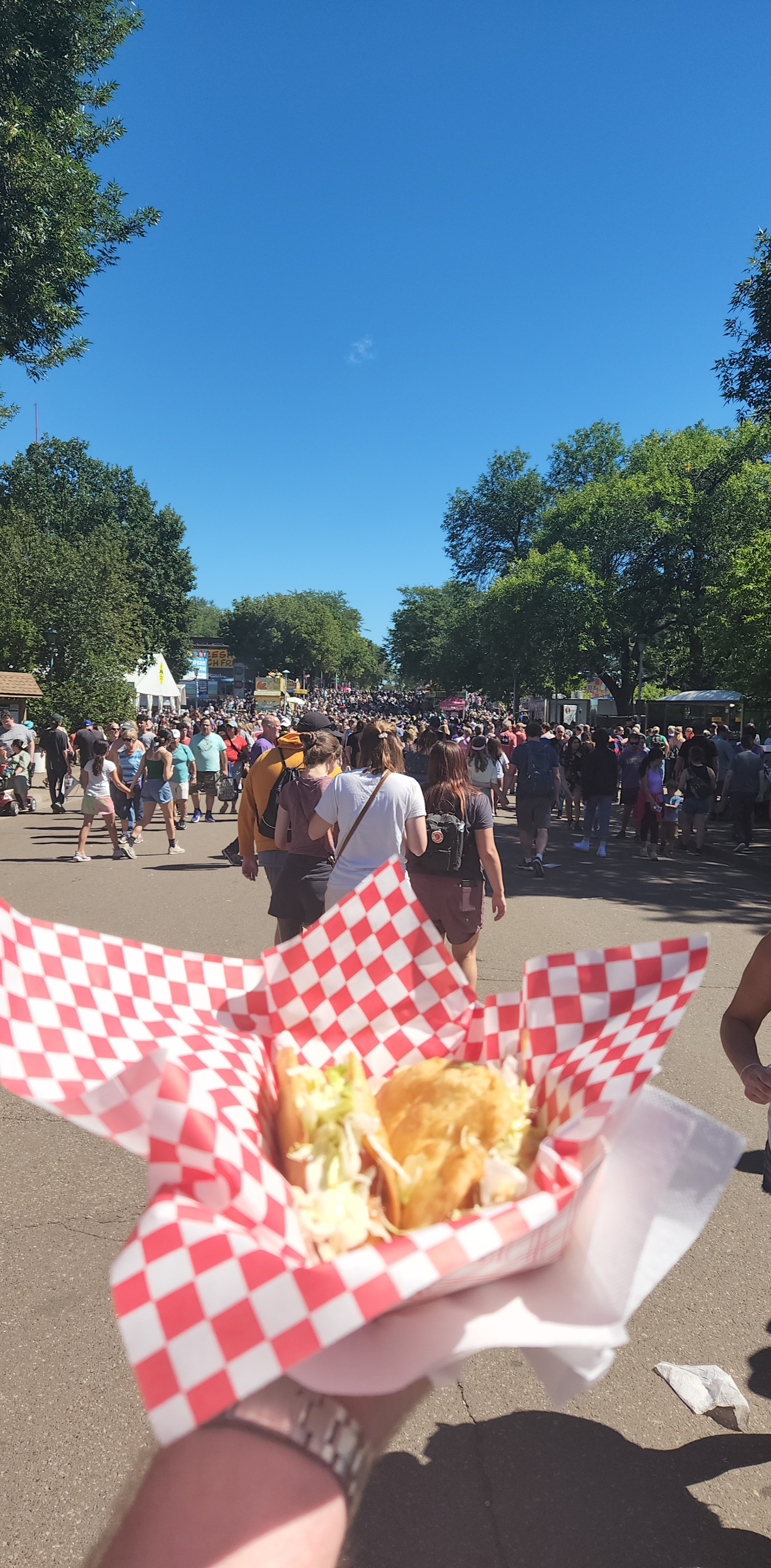
Cheese Curd Tacos held above the sea of people enjoying the Minnesota State Fair

Many foods at the fair are deep-fried or come on a stick, from the classic corn dog to alligator-on-a-stick, lobster-on-a-stick, and deep-fried candy bar on a stick. New to the fair in 2006 was hotdish on a stick, a variant of a classic staple of Minnesotan cuisine. In 2007, one new food was spaghetti on a stick. 2008's new foods included two types of bacon, one called "Pig Lickers", which is chocolate-covered, and the other, called the "Big Fat Bacon", which is 0.25 pounds (0.1 kg) of maple-glazed bacon. Another staple of the state fair is "Sweet Martha's Cookies", a stand that serves fresh and warm chocolate chip cookies in large buckets.

In 2018, 27 new foods were introduced to the Minnesota State Fair, including Firecracker Shrimp Stuffed Avocado, Honey Cream Soda Float, Mangonada Shaved Ice, Messy Giuseppe, Nordic Waffles, Smoked Soft Serve Ice Cream, and the UpNorth Puff Pastry. New foods for 2019 included fried tacos on a stick, stuffed cabbage rolls, feta bites, shrimp and grits fritters, blueberry key lime pie, Buffalo chicken chimichanga and assorted other dessert selections.

=== Machinery Hill/The North End ===
Machinery Hill is a large area of the fairgrounds. For several decades, it held the largest annual display of farm equipment in the world, with many companies showing off tractors, combines, and various attachments. However, modern displays generally focus on cars, trucks, lawn mowers, hot tubs and recreational machines like motorbikes. Farm implement dealers tend to direct their efforts to more targeted "farm shows", abandoning the State Fair to more urban or suburban types of exhibitors. Machinery Hill also contains an interactive exhibit for kids called Little Farm Hands. In this exhibit, children get to experience life on the farm from planting seeds to selling goods at the farmers market.

Machinery Hill is gradually being rebranded as "The North End". In 2019, a new main entrance gate was created in addition to the new North End Event Center, which hosts traveling events and expositions. Its 2019 inaugural event was Angry Birds Universe: The Exhibition.

=== Shows ===
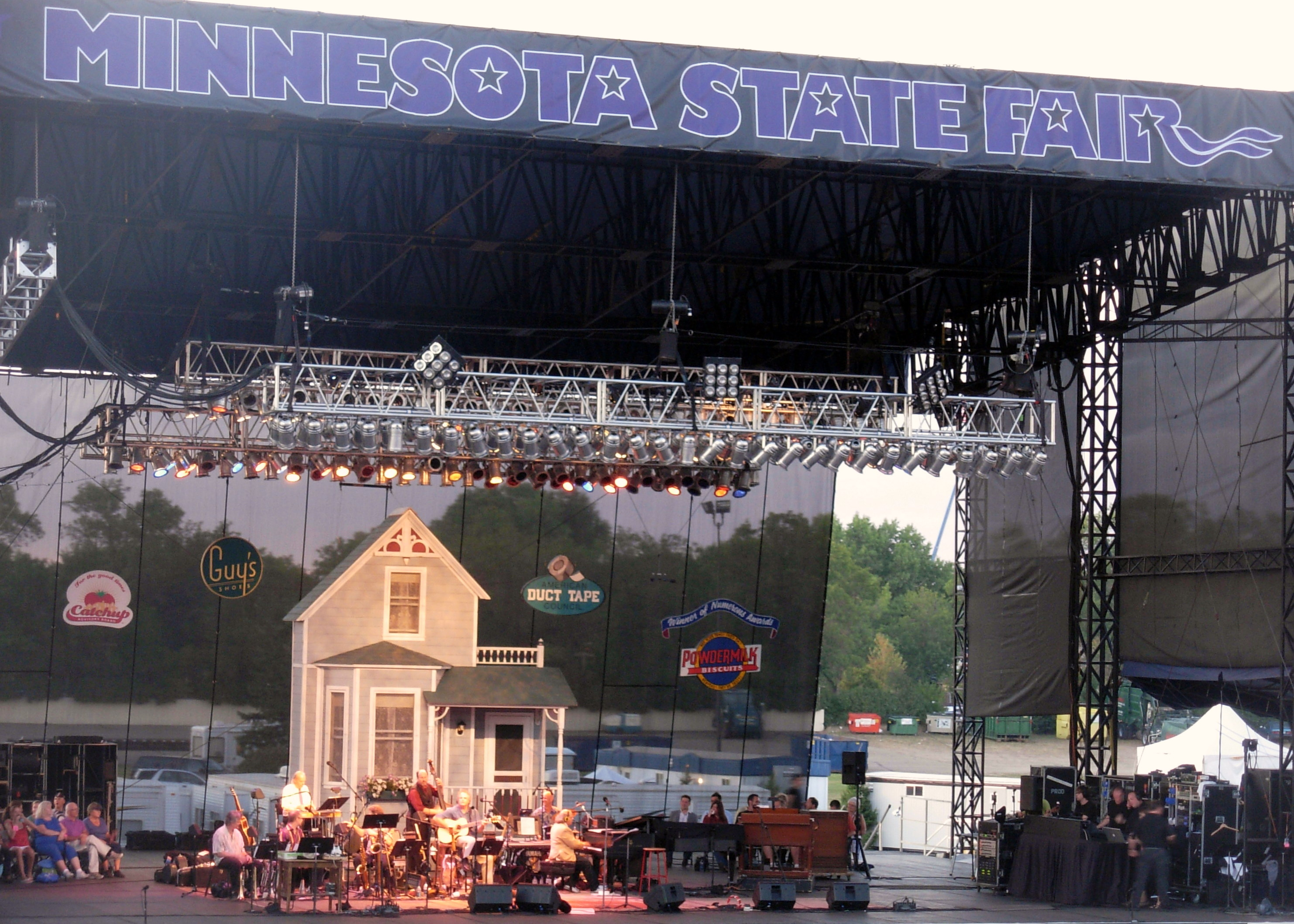
A Prairie Home Companion, live at the grandstand in 2008

The State Fair hosts concerts, comedy shows, product demonstrations, the State Fair Talent Contest and other shows. WCCO radio host Al Sheehan was the fair's superintendent of attractions in the 1930s and 1940s, and was a liaison between the performers and the fair's board of governors.

The Grandstand is a large outdoor concert venue that also features three floors of interior exhibition space. It hosts the largest of the fair's concerts and until 2002 was also the site of stock car races run on a small oval track. In 2003 the facility completed the first phase of a $35 million remodeling project that removed large sections of bleachers and increased seating capacity to 17,000. Most local television and radio stations set up temporary studios at the State Fair in permanent buildings or booths.

In 2012 the fair began holding the Walker Art Center's Internet Cat Video Festival at the grandstand. Fairgoers view the year's most popular cat videos and memes and award the best videos with cat trophies, the most prized being the Golden Kitty. Guest appearances have included the Internet stars Grumpy Cat and Lil Bub, as well as the creator of Nyan Cat, Christopher Torres.

=== Art ===
The fair displays an annual art exhibition that is the result of a juried competition of works of fine art. Media include watercolor, oil, and acrylic paintings, photographs, sculptures, pastels, ceramics, glass, and textiles. Entrants must be living residents of the state. In 2010, a total of 2,330 pieces were submitted, and 413 works were accepted.

One unusual display at the fair consists of the entrants in the crop art competition. The artwork must be made of plant matter (seeds, stems, flowers, fruit, etc.) suitable for growing in Minnesota. For decades the display was dominated by Owatonna native Lillian Colton (1912–2007), who created seed portraits professionally, having effectively captured scores of celebrities such as Ernest Hemingway, Barbra Streisand, Franklin D. Roosevelt, Prince, Princess Diana, and Willie Nelson in her crop art. After winning nine purple ribbons, she stopped competing, but continued displaying her work at the fair.

There are competitions in dozens of categories in needlecraft, garment-making, woodworking, models, painting, doll-making, taxidermy, stamp-collecting, scrapbooking, baking, canning, and others.

=== Milk run ===
The annual 5K run begins on the fairgrounds, winds its way through the Saint Paul campus of the University of Minnesota and the Saint Anthony Park neighborhood, and ends back at the fairgrounds.

=== 4-H ===
4-H has a significant presence at the fair, both in the 4-H Building and in the animal barns and arenas. Contests include herdsmanship, horse showmanship, judging teams, public presentations, county club exhibits, and the popular llama and alpaca costume contest. Livestock displays include beef and dairy cattle, dairy and market goats, poultry (chickens, ducks, geese, turkeys, and pigeons), rabbits, domestic sheep, and swine. About half of all 4-H projects entered are animal science projects. The 4-H building was opened and dedicated in 1939 and about 320,000 fairgoers visit it every year. The non-livestock projects include photography, performing arts, crafts, food and nutrition, and clothing and textiles.

=== Science ===
In recent years the Progress Center has been housing the Eco Experience exhibit, which features activities and exhibits including the design and construction of an eco-friendly house, a rain garden, exhibits addressing climate change, energy conservation, renewable energy, biodiesel fuel and vehicles, and organic farming. The exhibit has received awards from the Western Fair Association, the International Associate of Fairs and Expositions, and the Minnesota Environmental Initiative.

=== State Fair Carousel ===
In 1913 Austin McFadden, a Michigan entrepreneur, approached the fair about building the first roller coaster on the fairgrounds but was turned down. The next year he was back and offered to throw in a merry-go-round to get the Fair Board's approval. They approved the idea, and for the price of $8,500 McFadden got 30 tons of wood and steel decorated with 68 hand-carved horses, two chariots and an organ from the Philadelphia Toboggan Company. The Carousel became a State Fair institution that was widely but incorrectly assumed to be owned by the fairgrounds. It had no sign on it indicating its ownership was not public while being installed on public land. Without any disclosure, in 1988, the Fair Board refused to extend the Carousel's lease. The public learned the owners had dismantled the Carousel and sent it to auction in New York, with the price set at $1.1 million. The idea that the State Fair Carousel would be lost to Minnesota prompted a public effort to save it. While not at the fairgrounds today, it remains intact at Como Park in Saint Paul. It is now named for the largest contributor to its remaining in Minnesota, Gerard Cafesjian.

== Entertainment ==
=== Music ===
Musical venues include the Grandstand, with a capacity of up to 17,000, plus other free entertainment venues.

=== Permanent rides ===
There are several rides that are permanent fixtures at the fair, including the Giant Slide, on which fairgoers ride down a large fiberglass slide on burlap sacks. The Skyride is an aerial lift ride that carries fairgoers across the grounds in a gondola. The Space Tower is a gyro tower that rotates as it lifts people over 300 feet (90 m) in the air, giving views of the Minneapolis/Saint Paul area. There is also a haunted house which has been around since 1977 and is located on Judson Avenue. The fair's oldest existing ride, Ye Old Mill (opened in 1915), is located near the food building. It is a "tunnel of love"–style ride for all ages.

=== Temporary rides ===
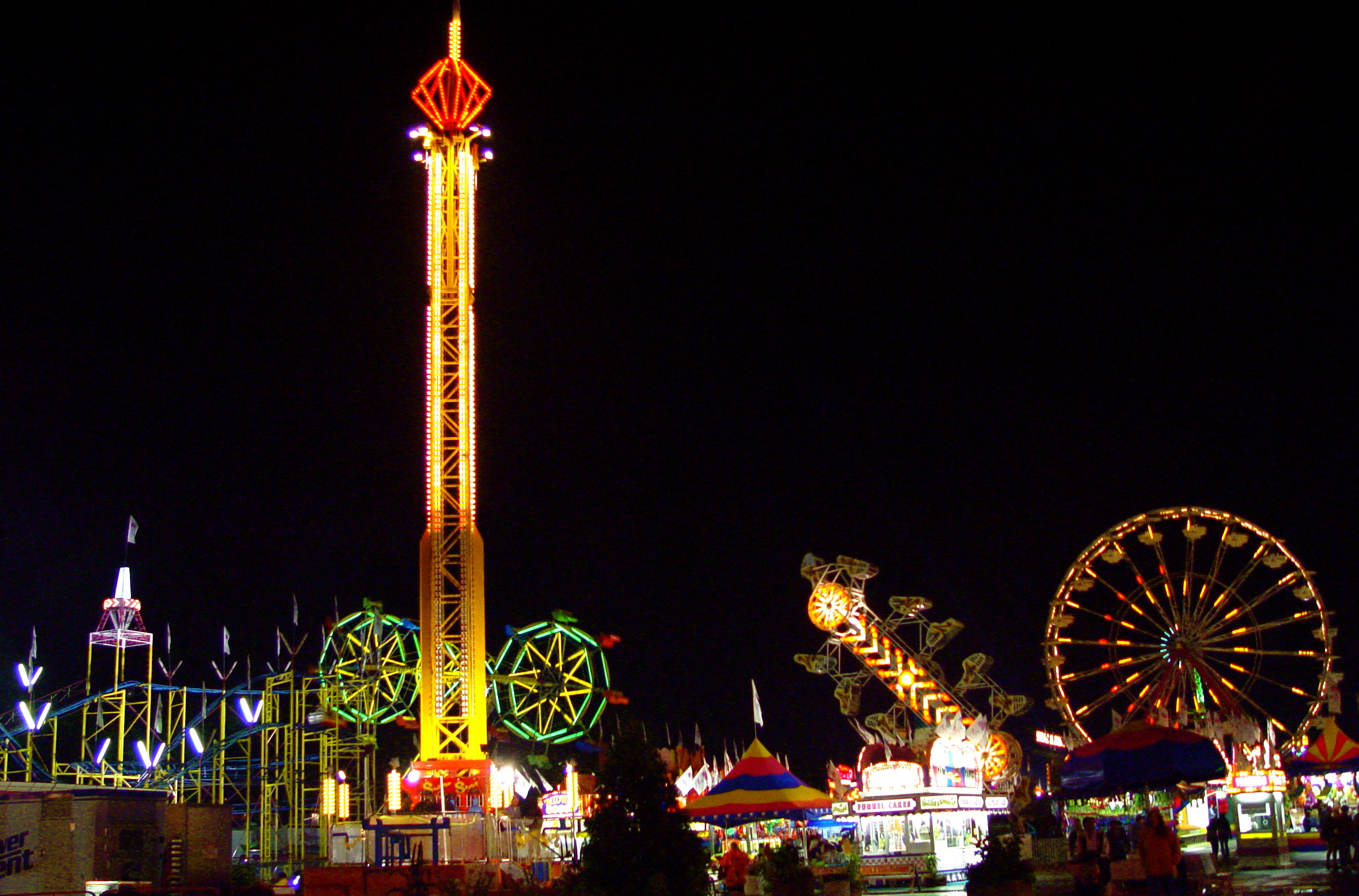
The Midway

The Midway is a carnival-like setting that contains most of the rides at the State Fair. The attractions include several funhouses, roller coasters and other thrill rides as well as numerous games of skill. It is located across the street from the Midway, but is not a part of it. Kidway is a carnival area on the fairgrounds geared toward children. Kidway is located between Dan Patch and Wright Avenues on the north end of the fairgrounds.

== Management ==
The Minnesota State Fair is a state government-related entity that is operated by the Minnesota State Agricultural Society. Management of the fair is handled by the board of managers. The state fair has not accepted governmental funds since 1949. Revenue from the fair is reinvested into maintenance and the next year's fair.

The Minnesota State Fair Foundation is an organization that works to improve and preserve historic state fair buildings. The foundation is a 501(c)(3) nonprofit organization, and also supports State Fair agricultural, scientific and educational programs. The foundation provided funding for the new Miracle of Birth center.

The Fair employs about 80 full-time staff members for the entire year; in the summer, some 400 seasonal staff are hired. During the fair time, around 3,000 temporary employees are hired. The fair also serves as a major seasonal employer, hiring approximately 3,000 temporary workers each year during its annual run.

=== Police Department ===
The State Fair area is policed by the Minnesota State Fair Police Department. Their authority is given by section 37.20 of the Minnesota Statutes. In 2020, 37 police officers were dismissed and required to re-apply for their positions, requiring a college degree which a number of longer-serving officers did not have, prompting a lawsuit against the State Fair on the grounds of age discrimination. After a year in which the Ramsey County Sheriff's Office provided security at the fair, the department was re-established in 2021. By August 2022, they had reached the goal of hiring 200 officers.

== J. V. Bailey House ==
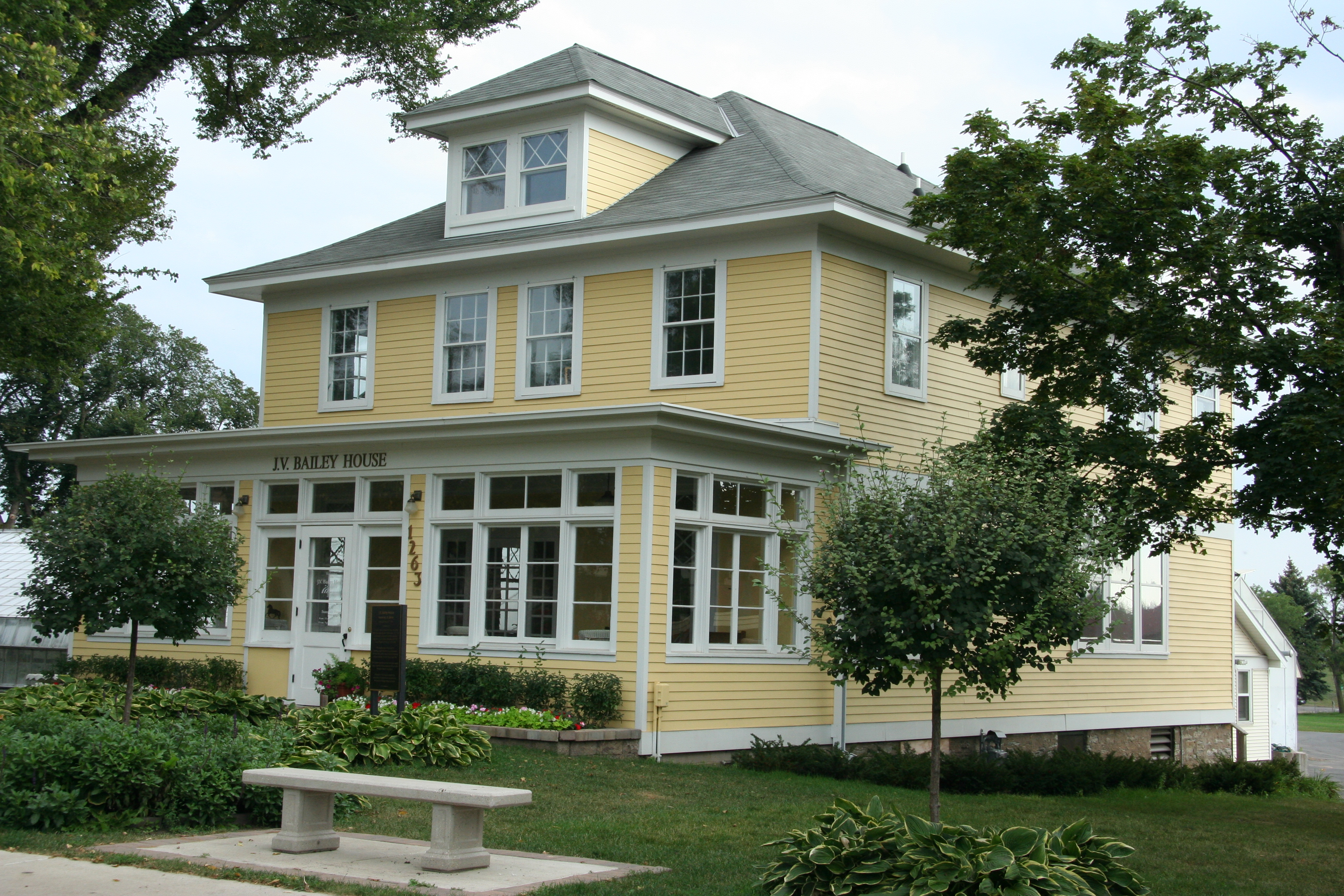
The restored J. V. Bailey House

The J. V. Bailey House, at 1263 Cosgrove Street, is one of the oldest buildings on the fairgrounds. It was built in 1911 and restoration was completed in 2006. It is connected to the greenhouses and was occupied year-round by the greenhouse superintendent until 2004. The State Fair Foundation operates out of the residence.

== Mascots ==
The fair's mascots are two anthropomorphized gophers. The choice of gophers as mascots is an homage to the University of Minnesota mascot, which is also a gopher and was originally an historical reference to the expansion of railroads in Minnesota, with towns popping up across the state like gophers. For these reasons, Minnesota is sometimes referred to as the "Gopher State". Fairchild, the original mascot, was suggested in a statewide contest by Gladys Anderson Brown in 1966 in honor of Henry S. Fairchild, who advocated using the former Ramsey County Poor Farm as the permanent site of the fair. Dressed like an early barker on the midway with a straw hat and striped jacket, Fairchild has represented the fair since 1966. In 1986, he was joined on promotional materials by his nephew, Fairborne.

== Attendance records ==
Day	Attendance	Year
First Thursday	155,185	2026
First Friday	204,065	2026
First Saturday	222,194	2018
First Sunday	209,969	1994
First Monday	145,022	2025
First Tuesday	136,987	2019
First Wednesday	145,531	2024
Second Thursday	156,764	2018
Second Friday	225,521	2024
Second Saturday	270,426	2018
Second Sunday	256,015	2024
Second Monday (Labor Day)	184,740	2019
Entire Fair	2,126,551	2019

== Off-season use ==
The fairgrounds host several events throughout the year. Events include horse shows in the Lee & Rose Warner Coliseum and Horse Barn, the Minnesota Horse Expo and the Minnesota Beef Expo, gymnastics meets and other sporting events, dog shows, antique and hot-rod car shows, motorcycle shows, model railroad shows, clothing and jewelry shows, gun and weapon collectors shows, comic book conventions, flea markets and swap meets, and more. Buildings on the grounds are frequently rented for commercial events such as appliance sales, computer and electronics sales, and boat and car sales. Earlier in the summer, some of the fairgrounds' roads are used to host an annual series of bike races during the week, called the State Fair Affair Criterium Series. Many buildings on the fairgrounds are rented for winter storage of boats, camping trailers, and similar equipment.

== Gallery ==
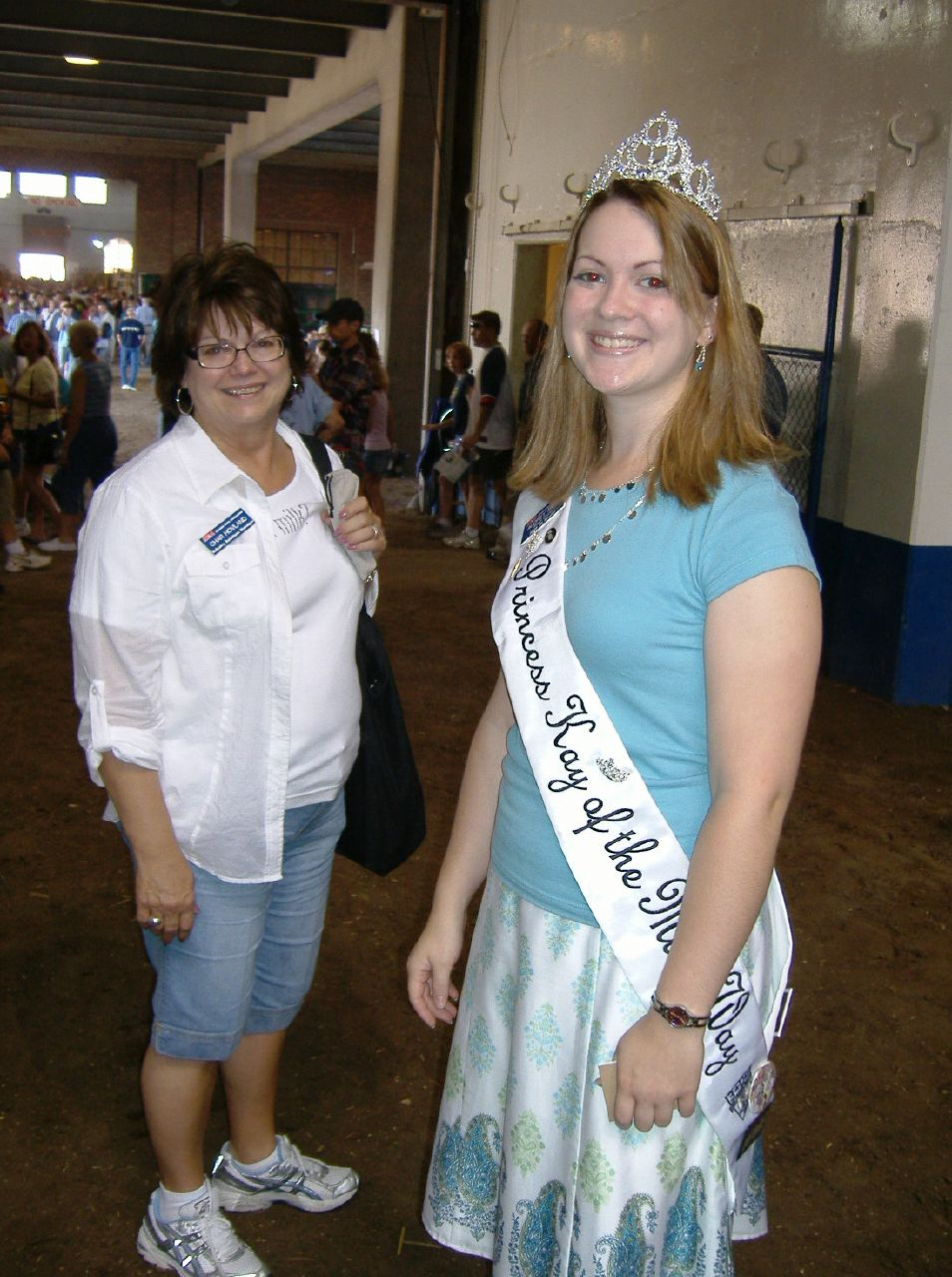
Audrey Mohr of New Ulm, Minnesota (right), Princess Kay of the Milky Way 2006–2007

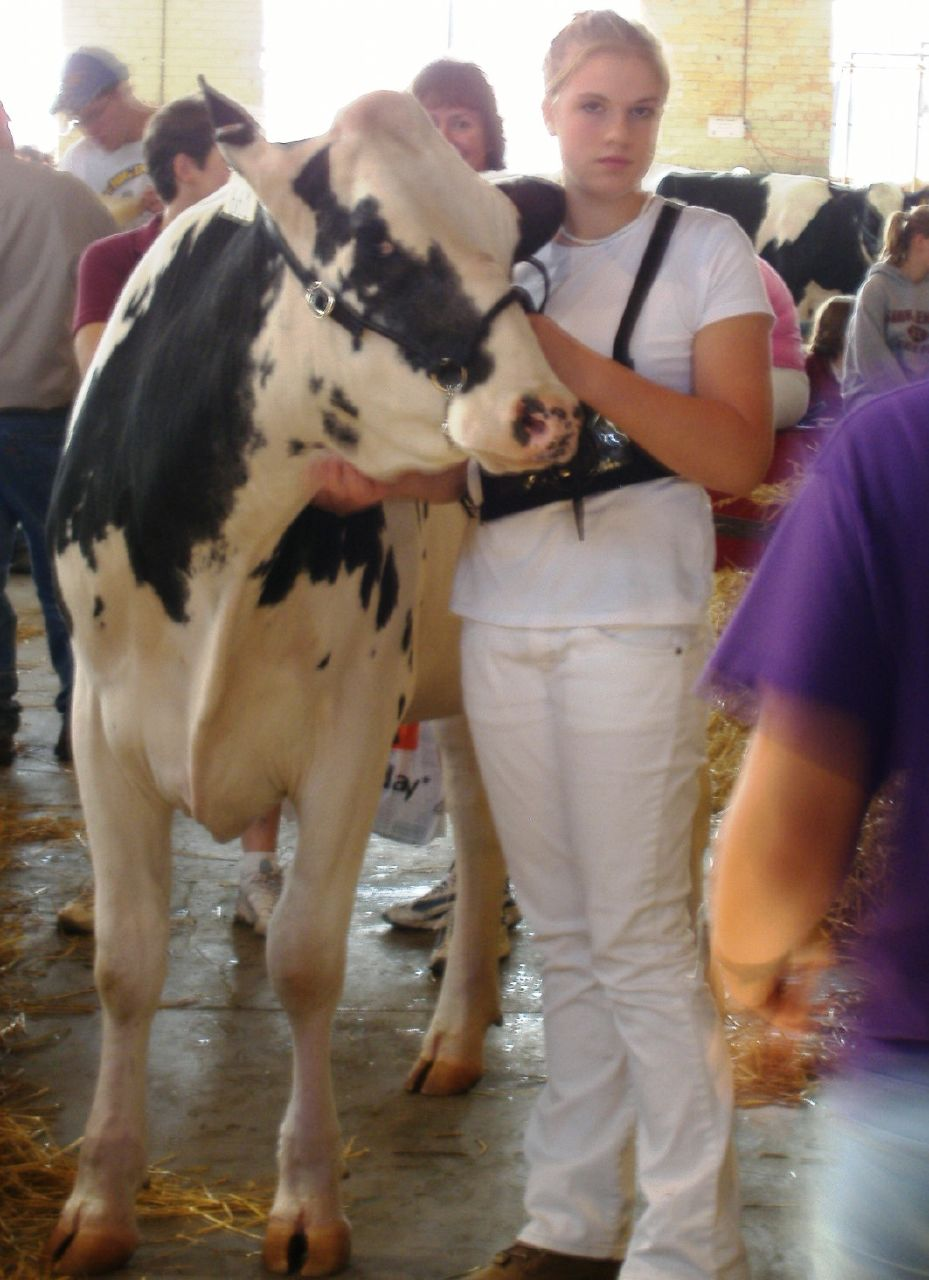
Showing a Holstein cow

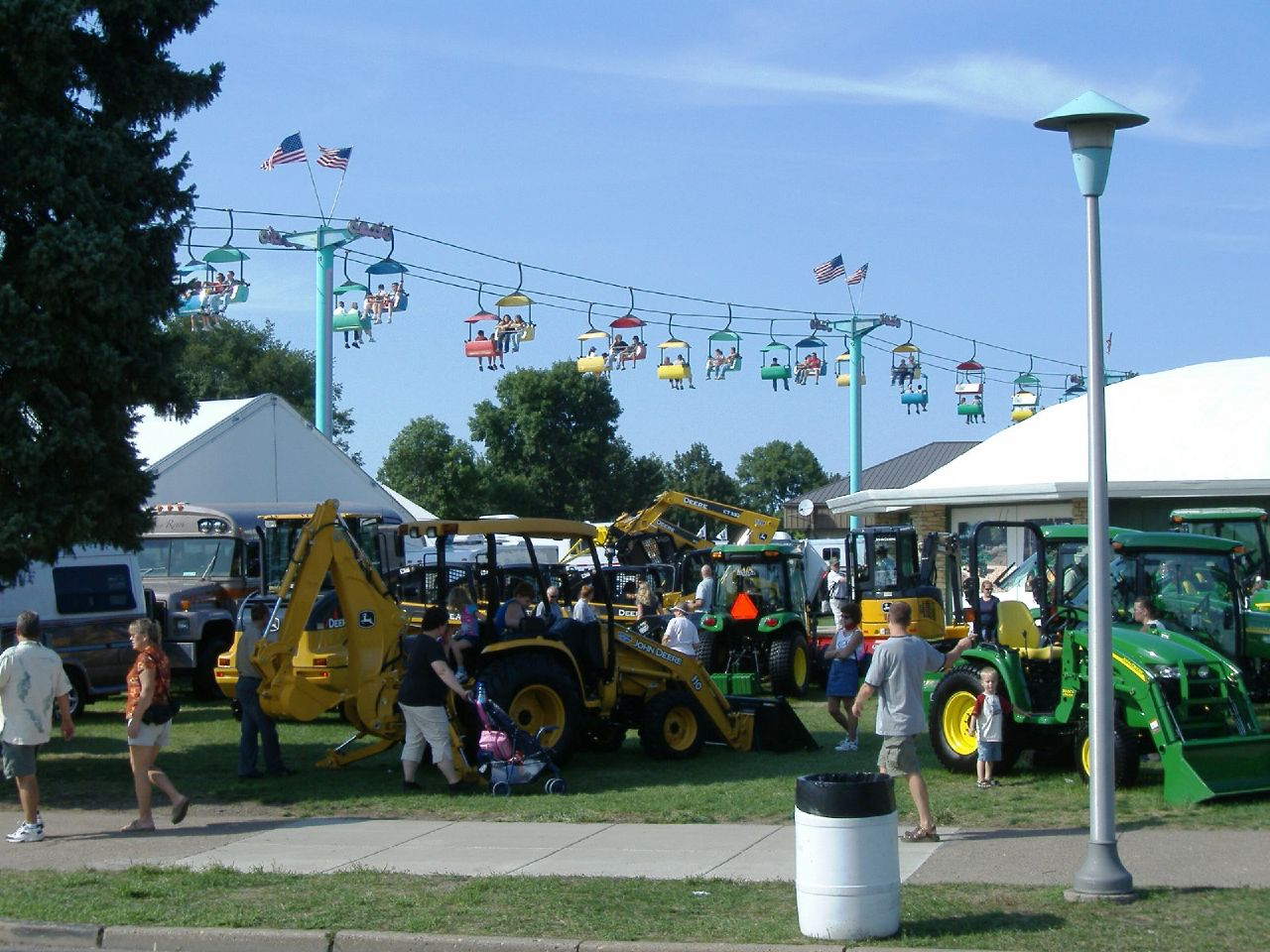
Skyglider, Machinery Hill

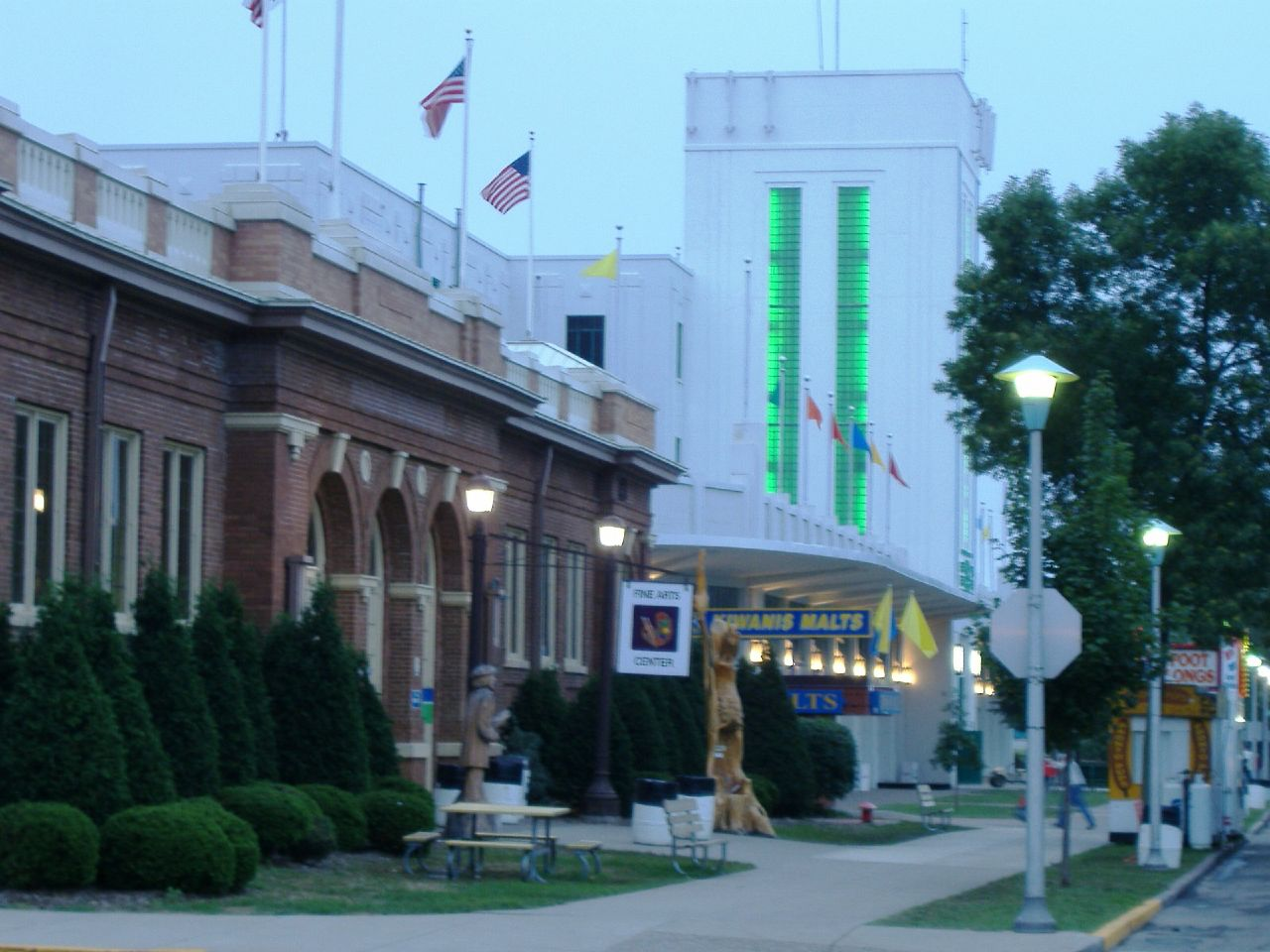
The Fine Arts and 4-H buildings

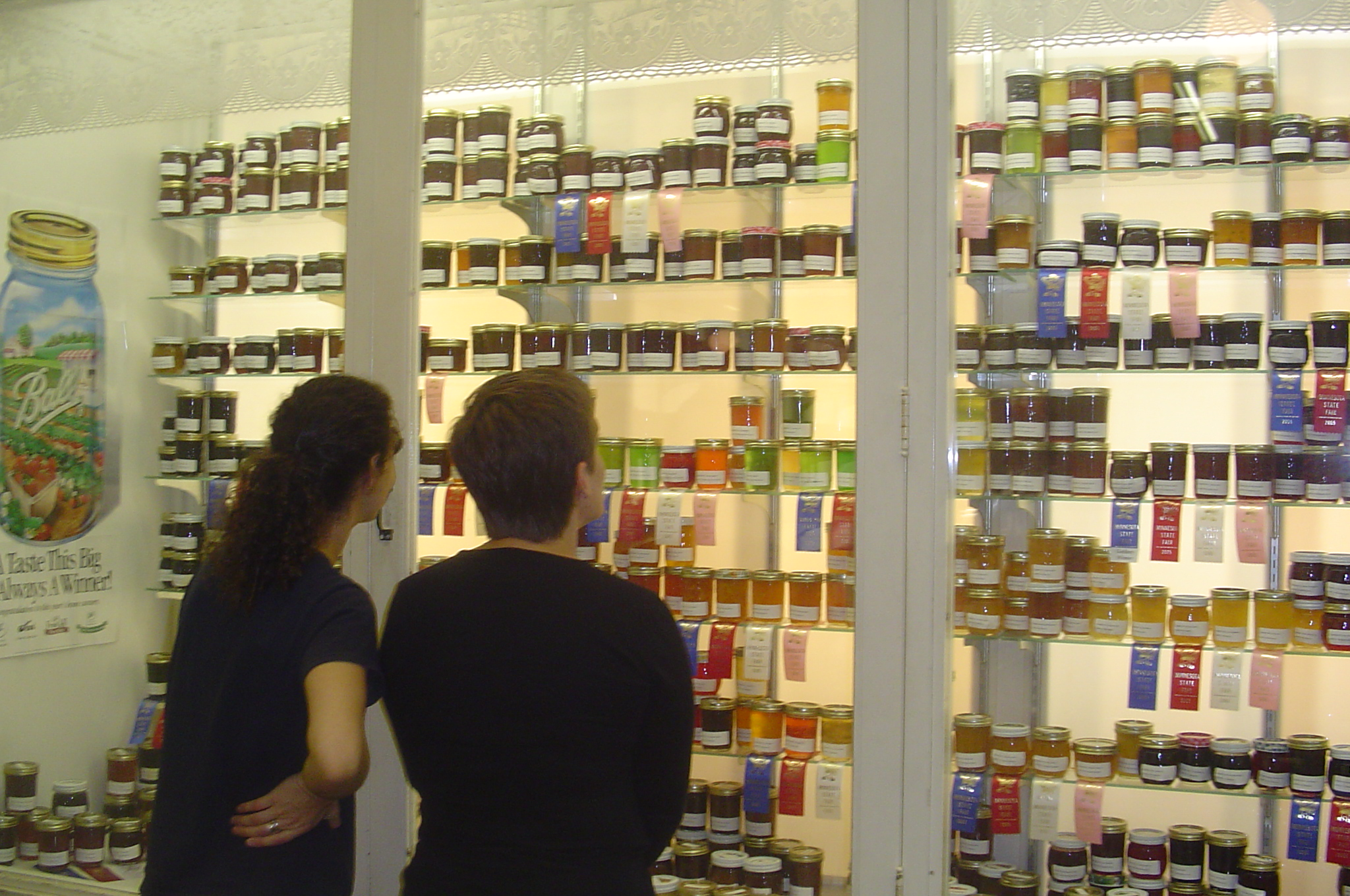
Jams, jellies, and honeys

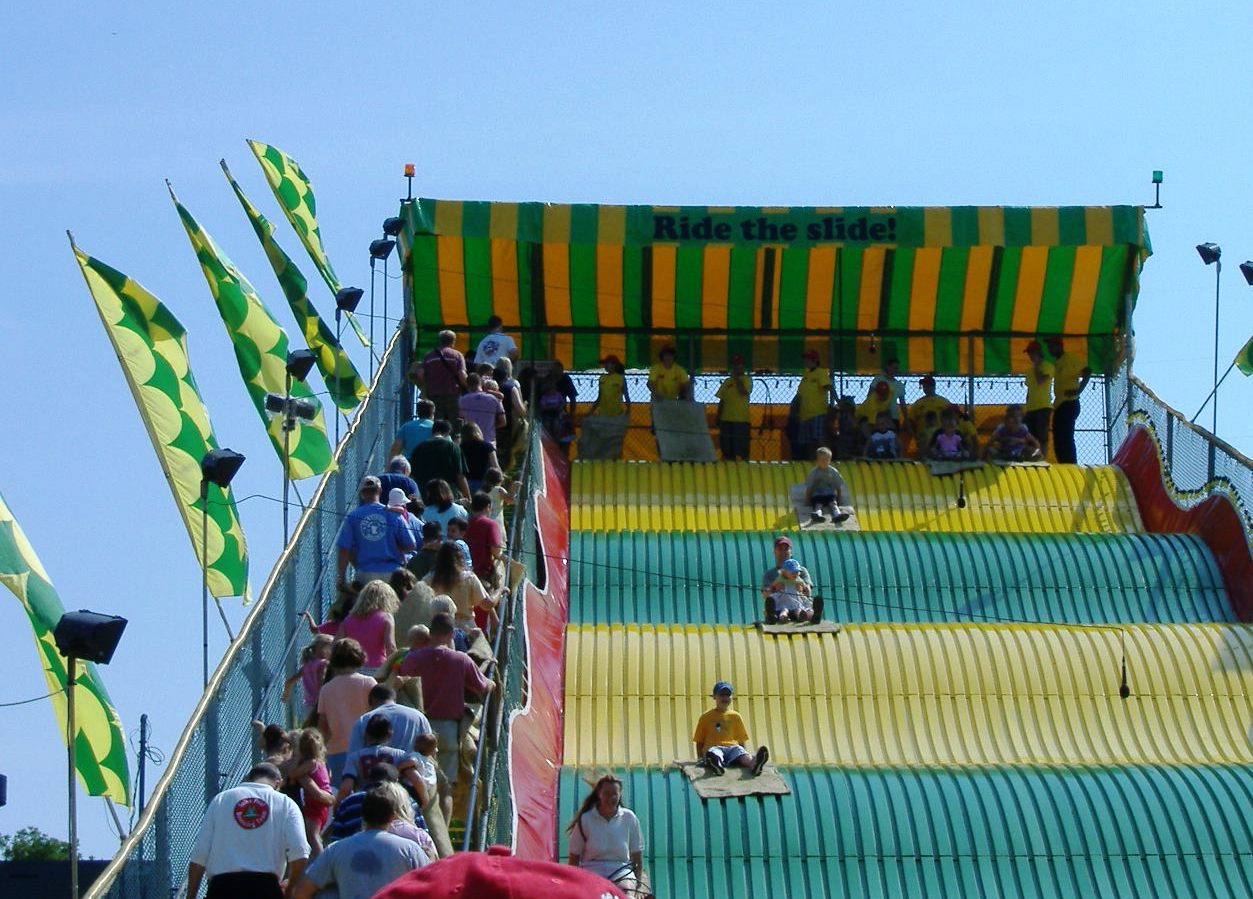
The Giant Slide

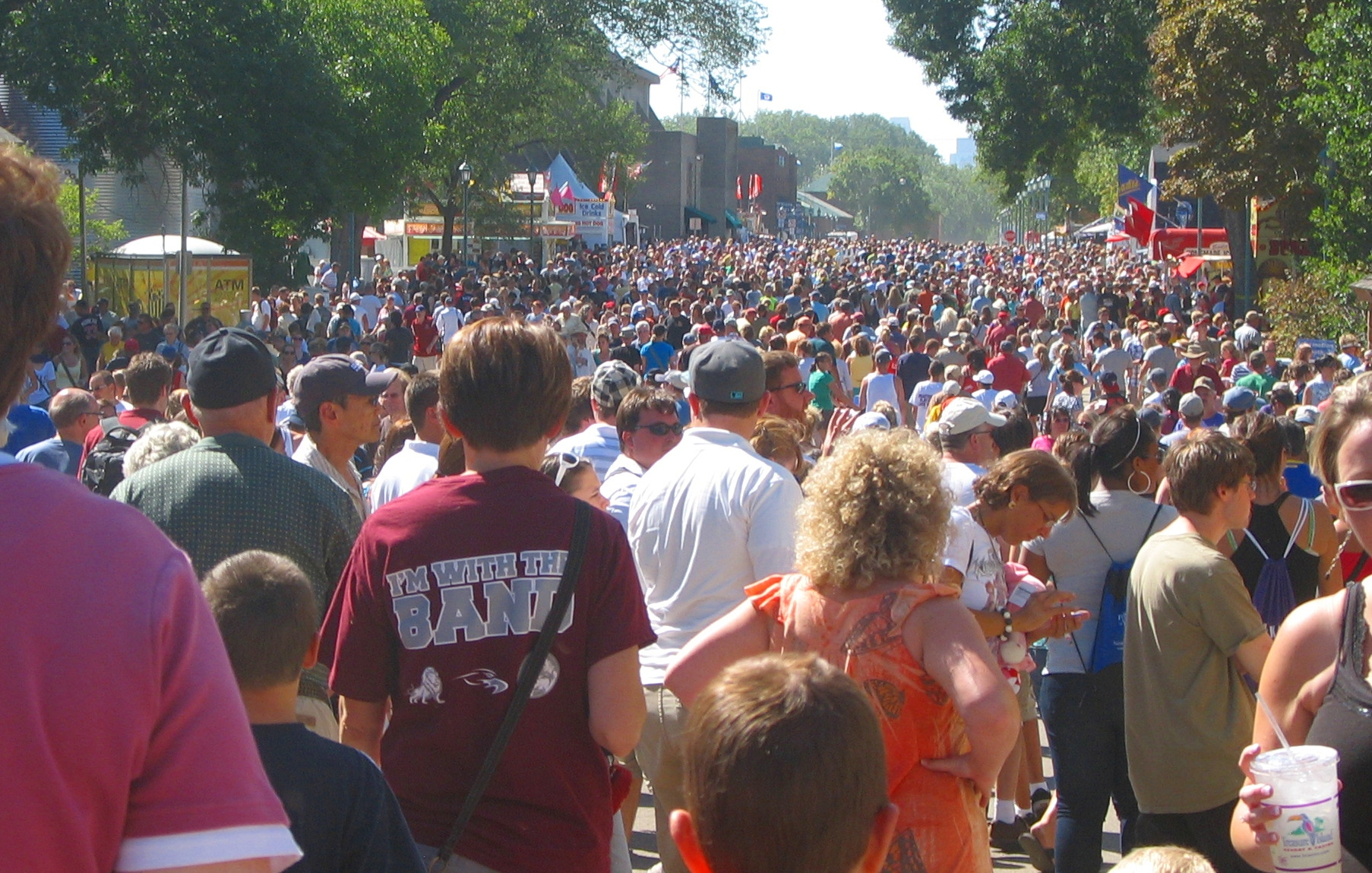
August 2010 crowd

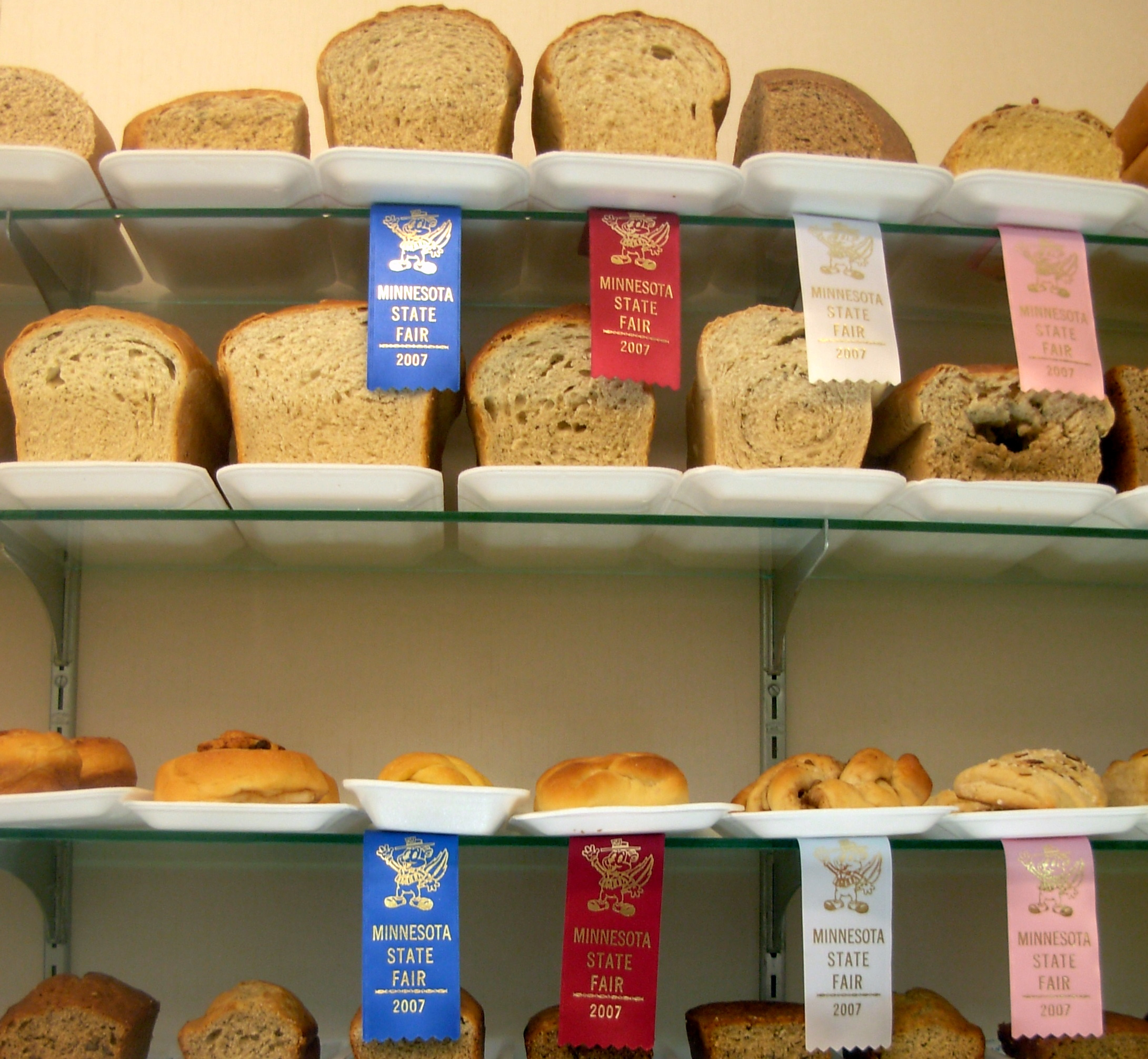
Breads and baked goods

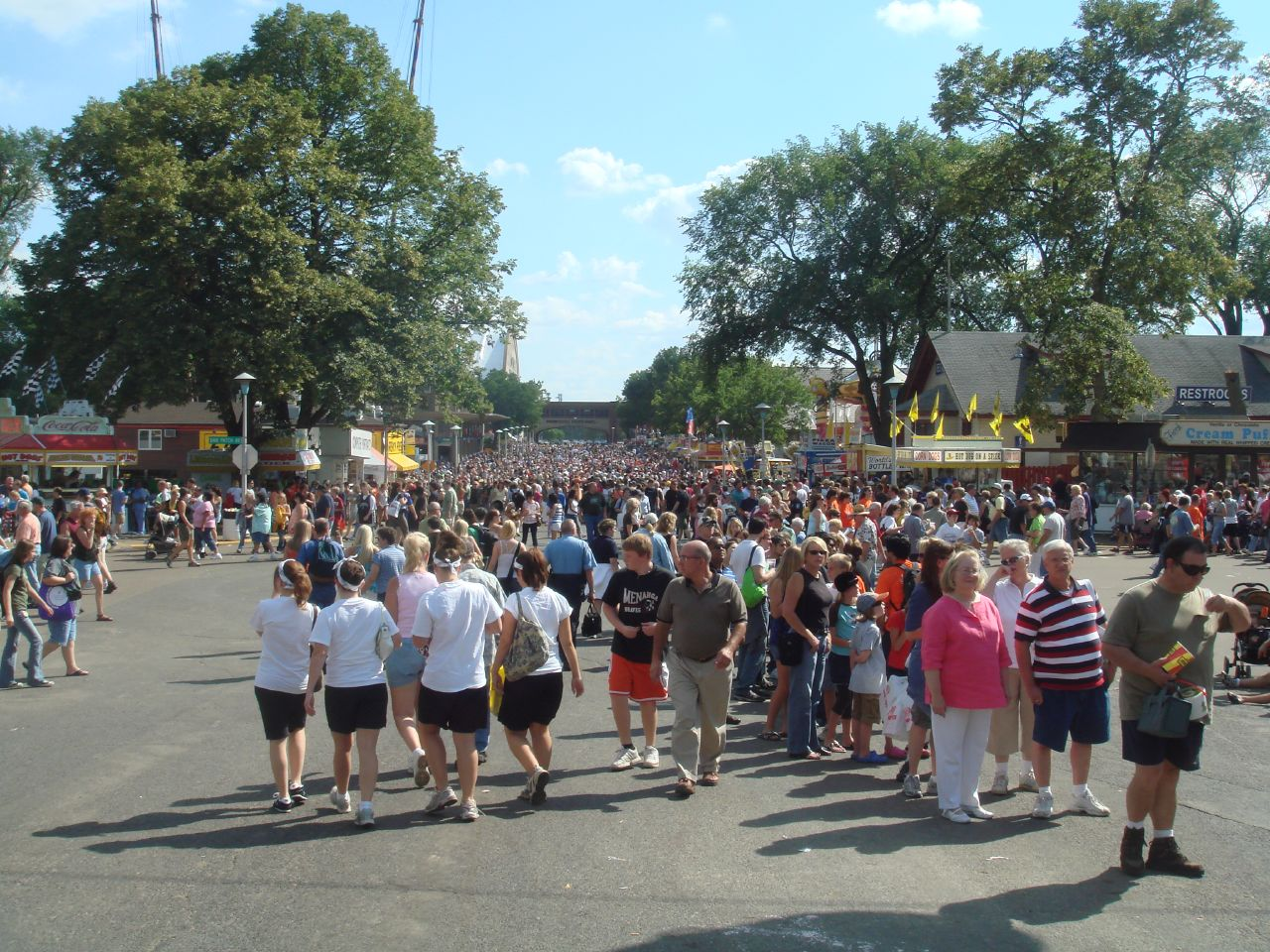
August 25, 2007

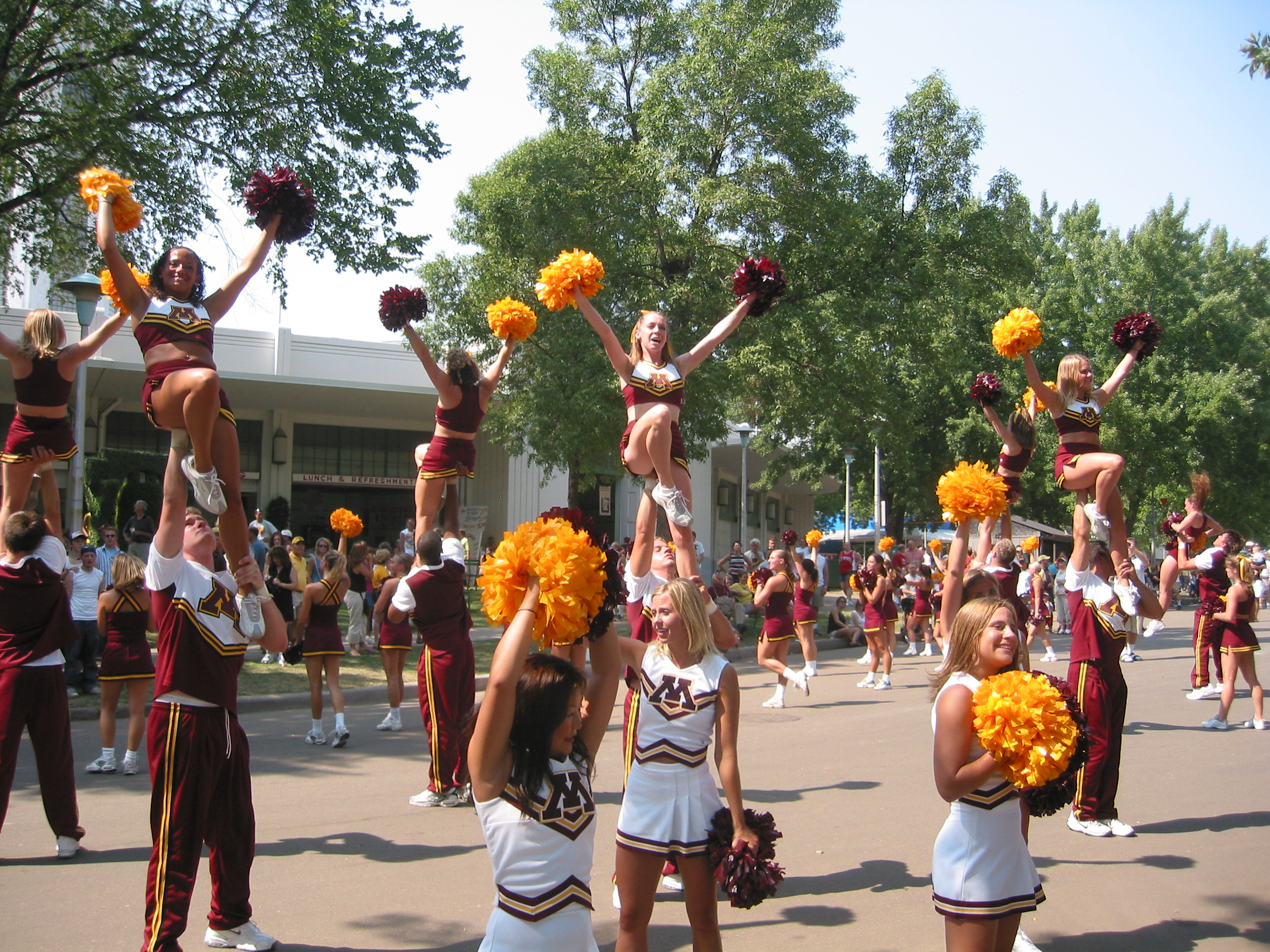
Golden Gopher Spirit Squads during the Maroon and Gold Day Parade in 2003

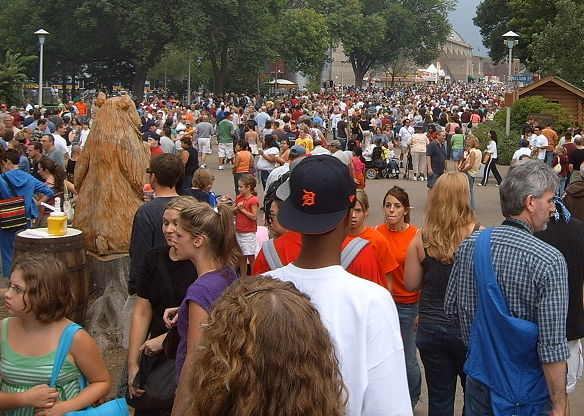
Daytime crowd at the Fair

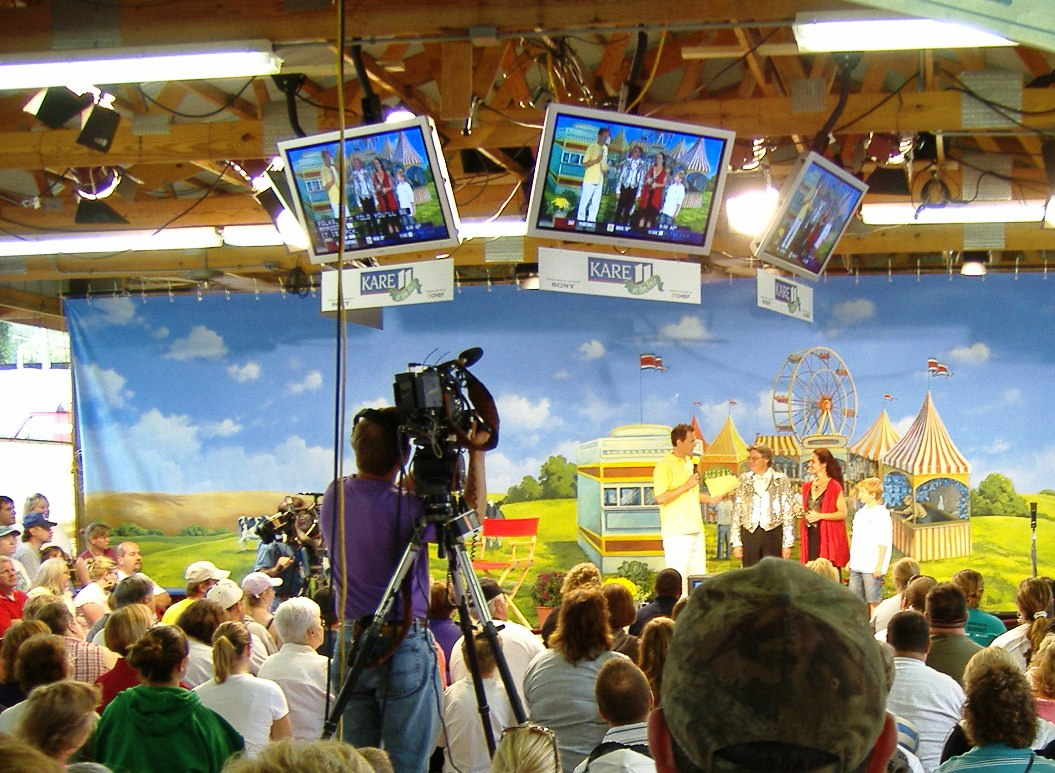
Television interview during the 2006 Fair
