= Knute Heldner =

Swedish-American artist

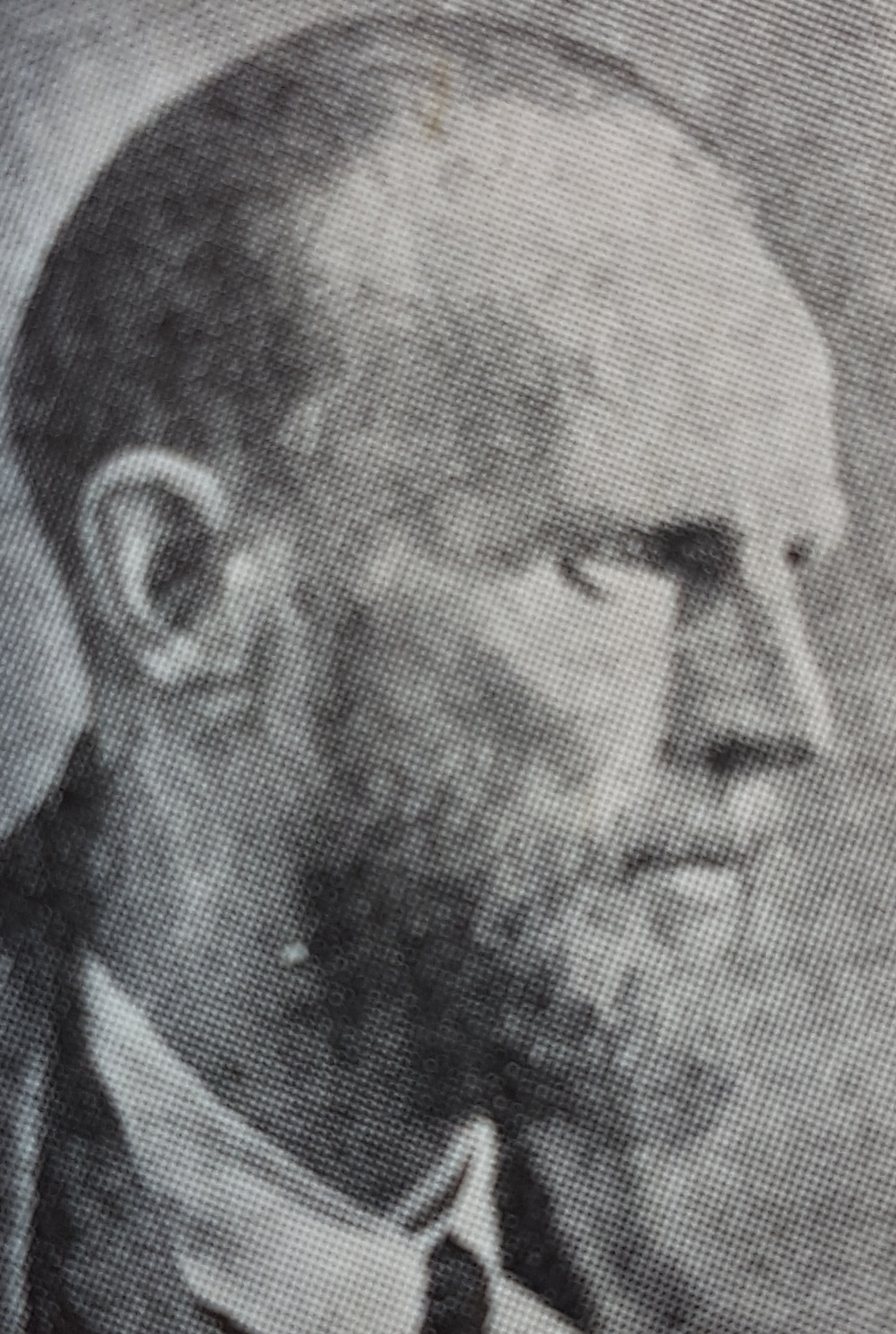
- Born: 1875; Vederslöv, Sweden
- Died: November 5, 1952; Orleans Parish, Louisiana
- Occupations: Painter, woodcarver

Knute Heldner (1875 – November 5, 1952) was a Swedish-American artist.

== Biography ==
Knute August Heldner was born in the village Vederslöv in Växjö Municipality, Kronoberg County, Sweden in 1875; some sources say 1877, or 1886 (also giving his first name as "Sven"). His early formal training was at Karlskrona Technical School and the Royal Swedish Academy of Arts in Stockholm. He migrated to the United States around 1902 and trained at the Minneapolis College of Art and Design in Minneapolis. He lived in Duluth, Minnesota until 1934. He was married to Collette Pope Heldner (1902–1990) who was also a painter and his one time student from the Rachel McFadden Art Studio in Duluth.

He won the gold medal at the Minnesota State Fair in 1915. In 1921 he exhibited his work in the Swedish American Artist's Association in the Swedish Club of Chicago. His style was modern expressionistic, derived from his training as an artist in Sweden. He was recognized for painting of Louisiana landscapes. His best paintings however were portraits. His work entitled Bearers of burdens was turned into a print. Heldner and his wife eventually made their home in New Orleans, Louisiana, returning to Minnesota during the summer. They were part of a loosely organized collective of 1920s New Orleans artists sometimes called the "French Quarter School" which catered to tourists interested in American history. He befriended playwright Tennessee Williams and helped him when the writer first came to New Orleans in 1938. Williams called Heldner "brilliant and very good-hearted", and said that Heldner's work may have been too avant-garde to have easy commercial potential: "They are very modernistic so are not popular as decoration for homes." He painted numerous views of the French Quarter over the course of his career, one of which, French Quarter Rooftops From His Studio, is now in the Ogden Museum of Southern Art. He worked for the Works Progress Administration's Federal Art Project during the Great Depression. He also expanded into woodcarving.

Knute Heldner died in 1952 in Orleans Parish, Louisiana at 77.

== Other sources ==
- Collette Pope Heldner. Artists' Bluebook
- Knute Heldner, Artists' Bluebook
- Louisiana State University Museum of Art brochure
