= Lillian Colton =

American artist

Lillian Colton (Sept. 8, 1911 – March 20, 2007) was a crop artist whose work, usually portraits of public figures made from agricultural products such as wild rice, hay, and timothy seeds glued to cardboard, has been prominently displayed at the Minnesota State Fair for many years. She was "considered the Andy Warhol of seeds" according to the Minneapolis Star Tribune.

== Biography ==
Colton was born and raised on a farm near Sherburn, Minnesota in rural Martin County. Moving to Owatonna, Minnesota after she married, she ran a beauty shop at her home in Owatonna called Cinderella Clip and Curl for 67 years. Lillian did not start as a crop artist until later in her life. Colton first entered her crop art at the Minnesota State Fair in 1966 and won nine "best-of-show" purple ribbons in eleven years.

According to Steve Pooch, deputy general manager of the State Fair, "..Once she attained her level of expertise, there wasn't anybody that could compete. ... Quite frankly, a lot of people didn't want to compete against her." As a result, she retired from the State Fair competition in 1983 "to let others have a chance at winning ribbons". She continued to be part of the show, though with "at least 50 of seed art pictures" displayed in the Fair's Horticulture Building and was hired by the fair to do live demonstrations of crop art techniques for fairgoers. She lived in Owatonna, creating pieces until her death. In total, four generations have entered crop art at the MN State Fair (pictured).

Several of Colton's portraits were featured in the Renwick Gallery's 2025-2026 exhibit State Fairs: Growing American Craft.

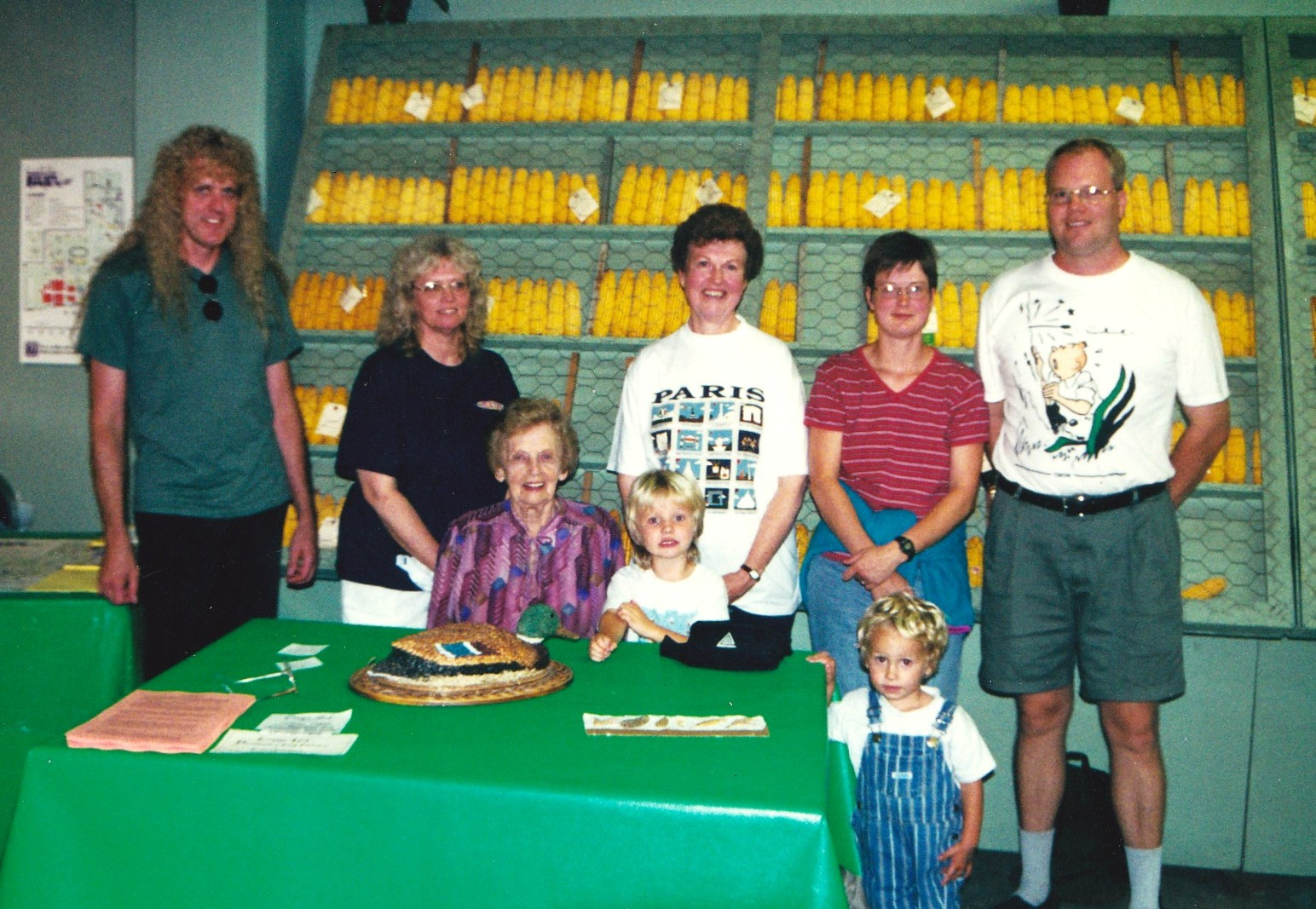

== See also ==
- Crop art
- Folk art

== Sources ==
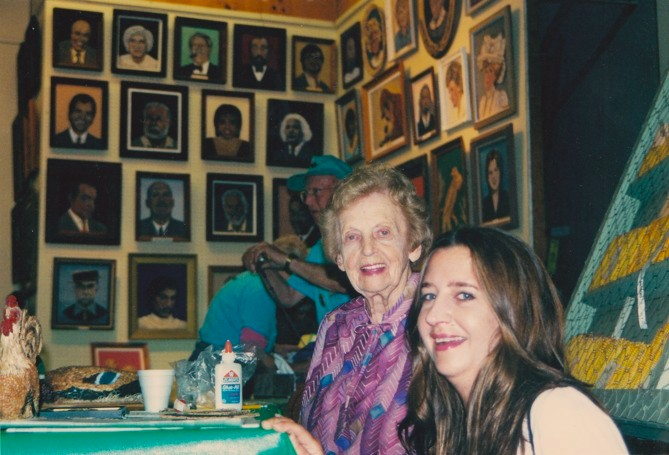
Lillian and fan at MN Fair with her portraits in background

- Seed Queen: The Story of Crop Art and the Amazing Lillian Colton, by Colleen Sheehy, with a foreword by Karal A. Marling, Minnesota Historical Society,
- Lillian Colton, 1911-2007
