= Dairy cattle showmanship =

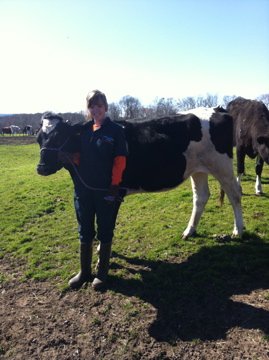
Halter breaking

Showing dairy cattle provides the dairy farmer a means of buying and selling their cows or heifers and selecting functional cows for their dairy herd. Shows can be social events in addition to important business opportunities.

Breeds of dairy cows that are shown are Ayrshire cattle, Brown Swiss cattle, Milking Shorthorn, Guernsey cattle, Holstein cattle, Red and White Holstein cattle and Jersey cattle. In order to register for a show, payment and the registration for the cow or heifer must be submitted. The registration would include the breed, birthdate, dam and sire of the animal.

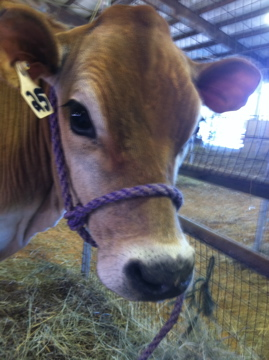
Young show heifer

== Difference between a heifer and a cow ==
A heifer is a female dairy animal that has not yet given birth to a calf. The female animal is considered a heifer from the time that it is born until it gives birth to a calf, which is usually around age two. Since the heifer has not had a calf, it does not have a fully developed udder and therefore will not produce milk. Once a heifer is bred, it is pregnant for nine months, and will give birth and then be considered a cow. During pregnancy, the udder will begin to develop more. After birth, a cow will supply milk to its calf for a short period of time, and then begin to be milked two to three times daily. Cows produce about 80 pounds of milk a day, however, some produce well over 100. A cow will continue to be milked, and once it gets pregnant again, it will be "dried up" about three weeks before calving, which means it will not be milked in order to prepare for having a calf.

== Selecting a heifer or cow for show ==
There are three categories that are judged in heifers: dairy strength, rear feet and legs, and frame. Calves are the hardest to select due to the fact that their dairy traits are not developed and therefore harder to evaluate. Heifers should be strong chested with depth and openness to their ribs. The next most important category when judging dairy calves or heifers is rear feet and legs. It is important for heifers to have correct set to their legs and be strong in their pasterns because if they cannot walk well while young, they will become even weaker as they age. The other category is frame, which refers to their stature. Heifers should have correct shape to their rump, be straight over their top-line, and walk uphill. When it comes to milking cows, all of the same categories are judged, but milking cows are also judged on their udder. For milking cows, the udder is the most important category with it making up 40% of the scorecard. Milking cows should have a securely attached fore and rear udder and a visible median suspensory ligament (crease) in the udder as well as good teat placement. Milking cows are also expected to have bloom and capacity to their udder and a level udder floor (no tilt or reverse tilt). As cows age, it is acceptable for their udder to become deeper and slightly uneven.

== Halter breaking and training ==
It is best to train the calf, heifer or cow to be shown as young as possible, and this should be done in continuous short sessions. Rope halters rather than leather halters are usually used for training and treats can be used to reward correct action. The animal should be trained to hold its head high and walk slowly, not running the showman over, and responding to their pressure applications on the halter. When standing still, the animal's front feet should be squared with each other. In cows, the rear leg on the opposite side of the judge should be slightly back so the judge can get the correct view of the udder.

== Preparing for a dairy cattle show ==
In order to prepare for the show, the animal will need to be clipped and washed prior to the show date. Washing the heifer or cow is important because they live in a barn, therefore, they get very dirty. To wash the animal, soap and water is used along with many different types of brushes. There are several different types of shampoos for cows. It is necessary to have the right type of soap because if it is not meant for an animal, their skin will become very dried out. Body clipping is standard with all hair being removed except on the topline and under the belly. The topline refers to the animal's back, which is just straight down on the top of the body. The topline hair that runs along the spine should be left standing and should be groomed with hairspray and blended to give the animal a longer and sharper appearance. Hooves should be trimmed prior to the show date to prevent foot rot and to improve the animal's appearance, as well as allowing the animal to walk more comfortably. The topline should be left to be done on show day, and this is done by using a brush and a high power hair drier and blow hair against the grain to make it stand straight up, then blow on the sides to angle the hair to form a prism shape on the whole length of the cow. The topline is then clipped to be as straight across as possible, with a slight uphill look to it. Preparing an animal's topline takes a lot of practice and can require a good amount of time in order to make it look show ready. Making sure that the cow has a full udder for the show is also important. This means that the animal's regular milking schedule may be slightly different the day before and of the show. Having a full udder means trying to have as many hours worth of milk in it without it starting to leak. Typically, cows have about 12 hours between each milking, however, for a show, showmen will "bag" a cow's udder, which means there will oftentimes be 14–16 hours of milk in it. Many showmen also use a product called final mist, which is a spray that is applied to a sponge or towel and wiped onto the animal's body, over their ribs. This gives the animal a shiny look which also helps make their ribs more visible. In the barn at the show, the animal should be offered plenty of water and should be fed according to its normal habit in order to not upset the heifer or cow's stomach. Beet pulp or other filling supplements can be offered as a filler to give the animal a bigger body appearance. If the animal will eat the beet pulp dry, they will eat more before being full. Bedding should be monitored and should be changed whenever needed to keep the animal clean and dry. Animals should not be tied with show halters for long periods since pressure from the chain shank will be applied to the cow's chin and will cause irritation. Also, rope halters used should be tied with a quick release knot to enable the showman to quickly gain control and prevent the animal from harm. It is important to wash the cow after the show to get all of the chemicals off, using a product that breaks down the adhesives applied to the topline.

== Showmanship Overview ==
Showmanship involves the showman being judged on his or her knowledge and presentation of their animal in the ring. Questions could be asked by the judge regarding the birthdate, breed, sire or dam of the animal, the animal's pedigree, what the animal gets fed, when the animal is due to calve, or anything else that the judge wants to know about the animal, so the showman should be prepared to answer questions when asked. The heifers are shown in a clockwise circle with the showman walking backwards, and keeping his or her eye on the judge at all times while leading the animal. The animal should be led from their left side, and maintain a slow but steady pace. When the judge signals to stop, the animal should be set up, and the showman should be at an angle facing the animal. The three ring practices are parading around the ring, side-by-side lineup, and nose-to-tail lineup. Showmanship is sometimes judged at the same time the animals are being judged, and other times it is before or after the regular classes. Showmanship is separated by the age of the showman, rather than the age of the animal like the regular classes are. In this class, it does not matter how good or bad the quality of the animal is, but instead it matters how the showman can control the animal, how they prepared the animal for the show, how much they know about dairy cattle and their specific animal, as well as how they present themselves while in the show ring. White pants and shirt are worn in junior shows. The showman should maintain a pleasant posture and expression when looking at the judge.

Show lineup

== Scoring ==
The scorecard for dairy showmanship was created by the Purebred Dairy Cattle Association and is how the judge makes his placement selections. The judge does not actually keep score on a card but bases their decisions on these point values. Frame: 15 points Dairy Strength: 25 points Rear Feet and Legs: 20 points Udder: 40 points
