= Nils Hellner =

German archaeologist

- Born: 12 February 1965 (age 61)
- Occupations: Archaeologist; Architectural historian

Nils Hellner (born 12 February 1965 in Göttingen) is a German archaeologist and architectural historian.
