= Collette Pope Heldner =

American painter

Collette Pope Heldner, born Dorothy Colette Pope (May 18, 1902 in Waupaca, Wisconsin – May 3, 1990 in New Orleans, Louisiana) was an American painter. She married Knute Heldner, who was her instructor at a school in Minnesota. The two lived and painted in New Orleans from 1923 onward spending sometime in Paris. She and her husband were part of a loosely organized collective of 1920s New Orleans artists sometimes called the "French Quarter School" which catered to tourists interested in American history. Mycologist James T. Sinski displayed a painting by Heldner in his home, in Frederick, Maryland, as a nod to his medical training in Louisiana.

== Death and legacy ==
Heldner died in 1990. In 2005 her work was included in an exhibition, "In a New Light: America's Brush with Impressionism" at the Morris Museum of Art in Augusta, Georgia. In 2020, a painting by Heldner was featured in a fundraising raffle for the Friends of the LSU Ag Center Botanical Gardens.
