= 1922–23 Michigan Wolverines men's ice hockey season =

- Conference: Independent
- Home ice: Weinberg Coliseum

Record
- Overall: 4–7–0

Coaches and captains
- Head coach: Joe Barss
- Captain: Kynle MacDuff

The 1922–23 Michigan Wolverines men's ice hockey season was the inaugural season of play for the program. The team was coached by Joe Barss in his 2nd season.

== Season ==
While a team from Michigan had competed against other colleges the year before, it wasn't until the winter of 1922 that the school gave the program its blessing. The team was convened for the first time after returning from the winter break and the initial practice was conducted by assistant athletic director George Little while the school searched for a full-time head coach. Michigan, along with Big Ten counterparts Minnesota and Wisconsin, formed the Western Intercollegiate Hockey League, using the same rules that the Big Ten had for eligibility and participation. From the start, the new conference was open to other hockey schools joining so long as they conformed to the same guidelines. Both Chicago and Northwestern had informal hockey teams at the time and were expected to join in short order.

Because the conference had only three members at the start, each would play the others four times during the season. Michigan's first game was set for the January 12 and gave the Wolverines very little time to get into shape. Joe Barss, who had coached the informal team the year before, was swiftly chosen as the first official coach of the program and he set about sculpting the team from the 35 initial candidates. While the team was being worked out, the Coliseum was being refurbished with new side boards and bleachers. The new accommodations could seat over 2,000 spectators and give Michigan a distinct advantage over some of its contemporaries. Just before the first game, coach Barss had whittled the team down to 9 players and named Kynle MacDuff, a holdover from the informal squad, as team captain.

The team kicked off the season with a solid defensive performance against Wisconsin. Eddie Kahn teamed with MacDuff to hold back the Badgers' attack and also ended up scoring the first goal in the history of the program at the 10-minute mark of the opening period. Wisconsin managed to tie the score and nearly won it near the end of the third but 600 fans were relieves when the referees disallowed the goal. Play picked up during the pair of 5-minute overtime periods and near the end of the first extra session, Michigan found itself down to just 2 skaters when MacDuff, Kahn and Anderson were all serving penalties. Fortunately, Comb saved the day and allowed the three to make up for their mistakes at the end of the second OT when a passing combination ended with Anderson's game-winning goal. The rematch that occurred the following evening saw an even bigger crowd but the game was marred by poor ice conditions. Kahn and MacDuff were again the stars of the show, stopping Wisconsin from getting anything going offensively while Comb cleaned up the few chances that leaked through. Lindstrom's long goal came off a face-off in the second period and gave Michigan its second win of the season.

The following Week, Michigan travelled to complete the season series against Wisconsin. Once more, the team's starting defensemen were front and center holding off the Badger attack. Near the end of the second period, a collision in the Wisconsin end sent five players sprawling on the ice but the puck ended up bouncing to MacDuff. The captain found himself free and fired a shot into the net for the only goal of the game. Beresford was later cut over the eye and replaced for the remainder of the match by Henderson. While the Michigan defense had been its strong suit in the first three games, the offense had yet to sort things out. That trend continued in the fourth and final game with Wisconsin and ended up costing the Wolverines, who were shutout for the first time in their history. Switching Beresford and Kahn to give the forwards some needed speed didn't help and the long goal given up by Comb was enough to end their winning streak but still left Michigan as the victors in the season series.

Michigan continued its road trip by swinging through Minneapolis to take on the Gophers. Unfortunately, the offensive woes continued and Michigan was blanked in consecutive games by Minnesota. Comb was the only consistent performer in the series and kept Michigan in the game despite being outplayed by the Gopher skaters. Michigan returned home for a brief rest and then headed to Detroit for a match against Assumption. The Wolverines remained inept up front by Kahn was able to finally end the team's goal-less drought.

During the exam break, the team played one game against a very strong Notre Dame outfit and finally saw the offense show some signs of life. Kahn and Henderson both scored to give the Wolverines a pair of 1-goal leads but Michigan was unable to hold onto either and fell to the Irish 2–3. The team's last chance to compete for a championship came two weeks later when Minnesota arrived for the final series. A winter storm pelted Ann Arbor but wasn't enough to dissuade 200 spectators from showing up and cheering on the Maize and Blue. With Lindstrom out of the lineup, MacDuff did his best to give them a show by opening the scoring but it was the Gopher captain, Frank Pond, who was the star of the game. He had a hat-trick by the end of the first period and Minnesota pulled away in the second to take the season series. The next night, the rematch looked to be heading the same direction when Minnesota built a 2–0 lead in the second period. Michigan's defense played much better than they had during the blizzard and stopped many scoring chances from the Gophers. Unfortunately, Minnesota broke up the Wolverines attack just as effectively and left Michigan down by a pair by the start of the third. After returning from the break in play, Michigan seemed to find a second wind and charged out of the gate, attacking the Minnesota cage mercilessly. After 5 minutes, Henderson, who had taken over at center, finally broke through and cut the lead in half. Michigan 's attack continued afterwards and the Gophers were unable to stem the tide. MacDuff tied the game in the middle of the period and, after taking a spill into the boards, Henderson completed the comeback with his second of the game.

The final game of the season came the following week when Michigan travelled for a rematch with Notre Dame. Early on, things looked good as Michigan opened the scoring while Kahn and MacDuff held back the Irish in the first period. However, Notre Dame broke the game open with three goals in the second and Michigan was unable to recover. A further two goal from the Fighting Irish left no doubt as to which team was better and Michigan's first season ended on a low note.

Harold Friedman served as team manager.

== Roster ==
No.	Nat.	Player	Class	Pos	Height	Weight	DoB	Hometown	Previous team
		Robert A. Anderson	Junior	LW/RW
	(United States)	James A. Beresford	Junior	D/W			1901-06-16	Wellsville, Ohio
	(United States)	Walter E. Comb	Senior	G				Sault Ste. Marie, Michigan
	(United States)	Clayton W. Henderson	Senior	C/LW			1899-04-28	Sault Ste. Marie, Michigan
	(United States)	Frederick S. Hosking	Junior	C			1902-02-18	Calumet, Michigan
	(United States)	Edgar A. Kahn	Junior	D/LW			1900-08-17	Detroit, Michigan
	(United States)	Carlton Lindstrom	Sophomore	C			1901-07-17	Sault Ste. Marie, Michigan
	(United States)	Kynle R. MacDuff (C)	Senior	D			1896-10-22	Detroit, Michigan
	(United States)	Daniel Petermann	Freshman	D/C			1903-05-08	Laurium, Michigan
	(Canada)	Morley M. Piggott	Junior	D			1898-10-04	Kent, Ontario

== Standings ==
1922–23 Western Collegiate ice hockey standings
	Intercollegiate							Overall					
	GP	W	L	T	Pct.	GF	GA	GP	W	L	T	GF	GA
A.T. Still	–	–	–	–	–	–	–	–	–	–	–	–	–
Carleton	1	0	1	0	.000	1	4	2	0	2	0	4	14
Hamline	1	1	0	0	1.000	4	1	2	1	1	0	5	3
Marquette	5	0	3	2	.200	8	13	5	0	3	2	8	13
Michigan	10	4	6	0	.400	13	23	11	4	7	0	14	27
Michigan College of Mines	4	0	4	0	.000	8	22	4	0	4	0	8	22
Minnesota	11	9	1	1	.864	36	13	12	10	1	1	42	14
Notre Dame	7	6	1	0	.857	25	11	9	7	2	0	30	18
St. Thomas	6	3	3	0	.500	17	14	9	5	4	0	22	15
Wisconsin	–	–	–	–	–	–	–	11	3	5	3	–	–

== Schedule and results ==
Date	Opponent	Site	Result	Record
Regular Season
January 12	Wisconsin*	Weinberg Coliseum • Ann Arbor, Michigan	W 2–1 ^{2OT}	1–0–0
January 13	Wisconsin*	Weinberg Coliseum • Ann Arbor, Michigan	W 1–0	2–0–0
January 19	at Wisconsin*	UW Ice Rink • Madison, Wisconsin	W 1–0	3–0–0
January 20	at Wisconsin*	UW Ice Rink • Madison, Wisconsin	L 0–1	3–1–0
January 22	at Minnesota*	Lexington Park • Saint Paul, Minnesota	L 0–2	3–2–0
January 23	at Minnesota*	Lexington Park • Saint Paul, Minnesota	L 0–3	3–3–0
January 27	vs. Assumption*	Belle Isle Park • Detroit, Michigan	L 1–4	3–4–0
February 4	at Notre Dame*	Badin Hall Rink • South Bend, Indiana	L 2–3	3–5–0
February 16	Minnesota*	Weinberg Coliseum • Ann Arbor, Michigan	L 3–6	3–6–0
February 17	Minnesota*	Weinberg Coliseum • Ann Arbor, Michigan	W 3–2	4–6–0
February 22	Notre Dame*	Weinberg Coliseum • Ann Arbor, Michigan	L 1–5	4–7–0
*Non-conference game.

== Scoring statistics ==
Name	Position	Games	Goals
Clayton Henderson	C/LW	8	4
Kynle MacDuff	D	11	4
Eddie Kahn	D/LW	11	3
Carlton Lindstrom	C	8	1
Robert Anderson	LW/RW	11	1
James Beresford	D/LW/RW	11	1
Morley Piggott	D	1	0
Fred Hosking	C	3	0
Daniel Petermann	D/C	6	0
Walter Comb	G	11	0
Total			14

Note: Notre Dame credited Comb with a goal in the game on February 4. However, as he was playing in goal, this is likely in error and the goal was scored by the similar sounding Kahn.
