= 1921–22 Michigan College of Mines Huskies men's ice hockey season =

- Conference: Independent

Record
- Overall: 8–3–1
- Home: 1–2–1
- Road: 7–1–0

Coaches and captains
- Head coach: Mike Fay
- Captain: John Travers

The 1921–22 Michigan College of Mines Huskies men's ice hockey season was the 3rd season of play for the program. The Huskies were coached by Mike Fay in his 1st season.

== Season ==
For the first time in its history, the MCM hockey team was able to play a majority of college teams. This was primarily due to the inception of several other mid-west programs in 1921. The Huskies, however, began the year playing Michigan, who had yet to formally adopt the sport. During a three-day stay in Ann Arbor, MCM won the series 2–1 and looked like they could pose a challenge to Notre Dame. They played host to the Irish at the end of the month and, though they pushed the second game into overtime, fell in consecutive matches to the golden domers.

After a two-week break, the team welcomed Minnesota to Houghton. The two fought to a 3–3 draw in the first game while the Huskies took the rematch the following evening. A return game was played when MCM took a trip to Minneapolis the following week and the Michiganders confirmed the earlier results with a second win. The Huskies remained hot in their stay, defeating an amateur club from Fort Snelling and then downing St. Thomas before returning home.

MCM finished off the year with another pair of games against the Tommies. St. Thomas came close both times but the Huskies were able to win twice and finish the year out with a 6-game winning streak.

== Roster ==
No.	Nat.	Player	Class	Pos	Height	Weight	DoB	Hometown	Previous team
		John Travers (C)		C

== Standings ==
1921–22 Western Collegiate ice hockey standings
	Intercollegiate							Overall					
	GP	W	L	T	Pct.	GF	GA	GP	W	L	T	GF	GA
Michigan Agricultural	2	0	2	0	.000	1	14	4	0	4	0	2	28
Michigan College of Mines	9	6	2	1	.722	22	15	12	8	3	1	33	22
Minnesota	10	6	3	1	.650	35	16	10	6	3	1	35	16
Notre Dame	5	5	0	0	1.000	23	3	11	8	2	1	61	26
Wisconsin	7	0	7	0	.000	7	39	8	0	8	0	8	43

== Schedule and results ==
Date	Opponent	Site	Result	Record
Regular Season
January 19	at Michigan ^{†}*	Weinberg Coliseum • Ann Arbor, Michigan	W 2–1	1–0–0
January 20	at Michigan ^{†}*	Weinberg Coliseum • Ann Arbor, Michigan	W 5–2	2–0–0
January 21	at Michigan ^{†}*	Weinberg Coliseum • Ann Arbor, Michigan	L 1–4	2–1–0
January 30	Notre Dame*	Amphidrome • Houghton, Michigan ^{‡}	L 1–4	2–2–0
January 31	Notre Dame*	Amphidrome • Houghton, Michigan ^{‡}	L 1–2 ^{OT}	2–3–0
February 13	Minnesota*	Amphidrome • Houghton, Michigan	T 3–3 ^{OT}	2–3–1
February 14	Minnesota*	Amphidrome • Houghton, Michigan	W 3–0	3–3–1
February 18	at Minnesota*	Lexington Park • Saint Paul, Minnesota	W 3–2	4–3–1
February 19	at Fort Snelling*	Hippodrome • Saint Paul, Minnesota	W 4–0	5–3–1
February 20	at St. Thomas*	Hippodrome • Saint Paul, Minnesota	W 4–1	6–3–1
February 27	at St. Thomas*	Hippodrome • Saint Paul, Minnesota	W 3–1	7–3–1
February 28	at St. Thomas*	Hippodrome • Saint Paul, Minnesota	W 3–2	8–3–1
*Non-conference game.

† Michigan did not field a varsity team at this time.
‡ Michigan Tech lists these games being played on the road, however, contemporary accounts have the games taking place at Houghton.
