= 1921–22 Minnesota Gophers men's ice hockey season =

- Conference: Independent
- Home ice: Lexington Park

Record
- Overall: 6–3–1
- Home: 4–2–0
- Road: 2–1–1

Coaches and captains
- Head coach: I. D. McDonald
- Captain: Chet Bros

The 1921–22 Minnesota Gophers men's ice hockey season was the inaugural season of play for the program. The Gophers represented the University of Minnesota and were coached by I. D. McDonald in his 1st season.

== Season ==
After several years of fielding a club team, the University of Minnesota decided to form a varsity ice hockey program in 1921. So popular was the sport that the school promoted the team to 'major' status before playing a single game. While the committee initially decided not to award athletic letters for the players, they left the final decision up to "M" committee and allowed them to overrule the initial decree if they decided that the status of the team would warrant such an action. In the meantime, candidates for the team gathered at the Armory for practice while the field outside was flooded for the rink. While all of this was going on, the team still did not have a head coach. Several names had been put forth including Kaler and McPherson from the local Minneapolis team as well as Archibald, who had served as the team's coach last season. While those choices were mulled over, Bill Taylor was tabbed as the team's manager and games with Wisconsin and Michigan College of Mines were tentavely arranged. Just before the winter break, I. D. McDonald (misreported as F. D. McDonald), a well-regarded Canadian player who had served as a referee in the area for several years was chosen as the program's first coach. Additionally, the team was able to secure the use of the Hippodrome Rink at the state fairgrounds for their home games but, after a rethink, decided to play at Lexington Park instead.

After returning from holiday, the team elected Chet Bros as the program's first captain. The team trained hard for their first official game against Hamline and, though the match was delayed from the 13th to the 17th, there was an excited crowd on hand to watch. The team took a bit of a hit in mid-January when several prospective players were ruled to be academically ineligible but enough were still available for the Gophers to have some hope for the season. The game was set for the Lexington Park and, despite all of the preseason work, the team got off to a rough start. Despite a lack of practice time, Howard Strange was ruled eligible just before the game and got the start in goal. He performed well in the match, however, as did the rest of the team. Minnesota, unfortunately, was unprepared for how physical Hamline played and were battered up and down the ice. Despite being the visibly more talented team, the Gophers fell to the Methodists 1–2. Minnesota hit the road for their next game and ended up with a much better result, taking down Wisconsin while posting the program's first shutout.

After a second win over the Badgers, Minnesota returned home for a 10-day rest before continuing their season. While the team had initially hoped to play Notre Dame around the end of the month, the match was scrapped and Luther Seminary was inserted in the schedule instead. The Gophers got a surprisingly difficult game from the priests but managed to eke out a 1–0 win. The close shave may have been a bit of a wakeup call for Minnesota as the team suddenly turned into an offensive juggernaut and dominated Wisconsin in the return series. With a clean sweep of Wisconsin, the Gophers sat at the top of the unofficial Big Ten standings and were clamoring for a meeting with the only other active team, albeit on a club level, Michigan. Several attempts to get to two together had already failed and one effort was made to stage a meeting in mid-February but noting ever materialized. In the end Minnesota was able to claim a conference championship but, without a victory of the Wolverines, the title was a bit hollow.

Instead of Michigan, the Gophers got to face the Engineers from Houghton when they travelled to take on the Michigan College of Mines. After tying the first game, Minnesota was shutout for the first time and lost their best claim for an intercollegiate championship. They still had an outside chance with the return match a few days later but a further loss ended any possibility of being the western champions. As the team entered its final game of the season at the end of the month, they were hamstrung by the loss of Bros. Jacobson was moved back onto the blueline in his stead which caused the top line to be shuffled around. Eldridge was moved to wing while reserve center Swanson took over at pivot. To fill in on defense, Strange served as a substitute in the match. The ad hoc lineup had a hard time working together but they were still able to avenge their earlier loss to Hamline and prevent the Methodists from claiming the state championship.

Note: The athletic department did not add "Golden" to the school's moniker until 1934.

== Roster ==
No.	Nat.	Player	Class	Pos	Height	Weight	DoB	Hometown	Previous team
	(United States)	Leland V. Bartlett		RW				Duluth, Minnesota
	(United States)	Donald Beard		C				Minneapolis, Minnesota
	(United States)	Edwin T. Bergquist		G				Duluth, Minnesota
	(United States)	Chester W. Bros (C)	Senior	D			1900-10-29	Minneapolis, Minnesota	East High School (USHS-MN)
	(United States)	W. Beaupre Eldridge		C/LW				Saint Paul, Minnesota
	(United States)	Preston D. Higgins		F				Minneapolis, Minnesota
	(United States)	Loren N. Jacobson		LW/D			1900-11-26	Minneapolis, Minnesota
	(United States)	E. M. Peterson		LW				Duluth, Minnesota
		Howard Strange		G/D
		Paul H. Swanson		C/RW
	(United States)	Alvin S. Wyatt		D				Minneapolis, Minnesota

== Standings ==
1921–22 Western Collegiate ice hockey standings
	Intercollegiate							Overall					
	GP	W	L	T	Pct.	GF	GA	GP	W	L	T	GF	GA
Michigan Agricultural	2	0	2	0	.000	1	14	4	0	4	0	2	28
Michigan College of Mines	9	6	2	1	.722	22	15	12	8	3	1	33	22
Minnesota	10	6	3	1	.650	35	16	10	6	3	1	35	16
Notre Dame	5	5	0	0	1.000	23	3	11	8	2	1	61	26
Wisconsin	7	0	7	0	.000	7	39	8	0	8	0	8	43

== Schedule and results ==
Date	Opponent	Site	Result	Record
Regular Season
January 17	Hamline*	Lexington Park • Saint Paul, Minnesota	L 1–2	0–1–0
January 20	at Wisconsin*	UW Ice Rink • Madison, Wisconsin	W 3–0	1–1–0
January 21	at Wisconsin*	UW Ice Rink • Madison, Wisconsin	W 3–1	2–1–0
January 31	Luther Seminary*	Lexington Park • Saint Paul, Minnesota	W 1–0	3–1–0
February 3	Wisconsin*	Lexington Park • Saint Paul, Minnesota	W 12–2	4–1–0
February 4	Wisconsin*	Lexington Park • Saint Paul, Minnesota	W 7–0	5–1–0
February 13	at Michigan College of Mines*	Amphidrome • Houghton, Michigan	T 3–3 ^{OT}	5–1–1
February 14	at Michigan College of Mines*	Amphidrome • Houghton, Michigan	L 0–3	5–2–1
February 18	Michigan College of Mines*	Lexington Park • Saint Paul, Minnesota	L 2–3	5–3–1
February 27	Hamline*	Lexington Park • Saint Paul, Minnesota	W 3–2	6–3–1
*Non-conference game. ^{#}Rankings from USCHO.com Poll.
