= 1922–23 Minnesota Gophers men's ice hockey season =

West Intercollegiate Champion
- Conference: Independent
- Home ice: Hippodrome

Record
- Overall: 10–1–1
- Home: 4–0–0
- Road: 4–1–1
- Neutral: 2–0–0

Coaches and captains
- Head coach: I. D. MacDonald; Emil Iverson
- Captain: Paul Swanson

The 1922–23 Minnesota Gophers men's ice hockey season was the 2nd season of play for the program. The Gophers represented the University of Minnesota and were coached by both I. D. MacDonald in his 2nd season and Emil Iverson in his 1st season.

== Season ==
After a good first year, Minnesota began its second official season with increased attention and saw 60 men try out for the team. Once the weather cooled off enough, the prospective players hit the ice for the first time in early December at Como Park. Coach MacDonald had hoped to use the Hippodrome but that venue was being occupied by the St. Paul Athletic Club. While the schedule was being put together, the players were being conditioned by hard practices and slowly whittled down into a varsity unit.

Once the team returned from the winter break, they get back to work preparing for the first game. Minnesota was able to secure the Hippodrome for the match with Ramsey Tech, a new school in the Saint Paul area. Coach MacDonald settled on the roster just before the opening tilt but the team had yet to elect a captain. Loren Jacobson had been selected to be this year's leader at the conclusion of the previous season, however, he did not return to campus in the fall. With the Gophers still looking for their next captain and the starters still unannounced, Minnesota was still very much a team in flux. Leland Bartlett, a returning player, got the team off on the right foot when he scored a hat-trick in the first period. New entry Frank Pond added 2 more while Addie Wyatt finished off the scoring. The defense allowed just one goal and the lopsided nature of the game allowed MacDonald to make several substitutions to get all of his players some ice time in the match.

The Following week the team took on St. Thomas for the first time. Jacobson was inserted as a starting defenseman in place of Wyatt for the game and the move provided the Gophers with a rock-solid defense. While the offense continued to score at a decent clip, the team didn't allow a single goal and earned their first shutout of the season. A few days later the team opened its conference season with the first ever match against Michigan. While both teams had stellar defenses, Minnesota possessed a far superior offense and goals from Pond and Wyatt led the team to victory. The rematch the following evening was almost a carbon-copy of the first with Wyatt netting 2 goals to Pond's 1 in the team's third consecutive shutout.

Minnesota Hit the road in February and ended up playing their next 6 games outside of the state. Up first was a weekend series with Wisconsin, who were looking for revenge after being swept the year before. Fortunately for the Gophers, their hot play continued and the team recorded another blanking, tying Harvard for the collegiate record. The Badgers fought back in the rematch and ended Minnesota's shutout streak. While Wisconsin was only able to secure one goal, their defense stiffened and held the Gophers to the same mark. The tie was the first dent in Minnesota's record but still left the team undefeated.

The following week, Minnesota was in Ann Arbor and got right back to their offensive game with a 6-goal performance. However, now without Higgins on the back end, the team's defense appeared weaker than normal and allowed more goals in that game then had in the previous six combined. That trend continued in the final match with Michigan and saw the Wolverines had Minnesota its first loss on the year. Despite having a 2–0 lead with just 10 minutes to play, The Gopher defense collapsed and allowed 3 goals to Michigan. The final goal happened just before the end of regulation and set the home crowd into an uproar.

The loss put Minnesota championship hopes on the ropes as Notre Dame, the defending champions, had one loss as well. The only saving grace was that the Irish had lost their game to St. Thomas, who the Gophers had dispatched fairly easily. Minnesota, however, could not afford any further defeats and had 4 games remaining on their schedule. Next was a 2-game series against Marquette and Minnesota got a tough fight from the new program. Still hamstrung on the blueline, the Gophers were only just able to win the two games, surrendering a pair to the Blue and Gold in each match. Minnesota returned home for the final two games with only Wisconsin left in their way. The Gophers had to fight through another close game to keep their title chances alive but finally recovered their early-season form in the final match to post one final shutout and capture the Western Intercollegiate championship.

Emil Iverson is listed as the sole coach for the season, however, contemporary reports have MacDonald as the team's coach through at least the end of January.

Note: The athletic department did not add "Golden" to the school's moniker until 1934.

== Roster ==
No.	Nat.	Player	Class	Pos	Height	Weight	DoB	Hometown	Previous team
	(United States)	V. Leland Bartlett	Junior	RW				Duluth, Minnesota
	(United States)	Bernard M. Bros	Senior	RW				Minneapolis, Minnesota
	(United States)	Merle G. DeForest	Senior	D				Hibbing, Minnesota
		Arthur J. Friedl	Senior	D
		William A. P. Graham	Junior	G
	(United States)	Preston D. Higgins	Sophomore	D			1902-05-25	Minneapolis, Minnesota
		E. Raymond Jacobson	Sophomore	D
	(United States)	Cary Langford	Sophomore	RW				Saint Paul, Minnesota
	(United States)	Victor I. Mann	Freshman	C				Buffalo, New York
	(United States)	Francis R. Pond	Junior	LW			1900-12-05	Two Harbors, Minnesota
	(United States)	Frederick L. Schade	Freshman	G			1904-03-25	New Ulm, Minnesota
	(United States)	Paul H. Swanson (C)	Junior	C				Saint Paul, Minnesota
	(United States)	Alvin S. Wyatt	Junior	D				Minneapolis, Minnesota

== Standings ==
1922–23 Western Collegiate ice hockey standings
	Intercollegiate							Overall					
	GP	W	L	T	Pct.	GF	GA	GP	W	L	T	GF	GA
A.T. Still	–	–	–	–	–	–	–	–	–	–	–	–	–
Carleton	1	0	1	0	.000	1	4	2	0	2	0	4	14
Hamline	1	1	0	0	1.000	4	1	2	1	1	0	5	3
Marquette	5	0	3	2	.200	8	13	5	0	3	2	8	13
Michigan	10	4	6	0	.400	13	23	11	4	7	0	14	27
Michigan College of Mines	4	0	4	0	.000	8	22	4	0	4	0	8	22
Minnesota	11	9	1	1	.864	36	13	12	10	1	1	42	14
Notre Dame	7	6	1	0	.857	25	11	9	7	2	0	30	18
St. Thomas	6	3	3	0	.500	17	14	9	5	4	0	22	15
Wisconsin	–	–	–	–	–	–	–	11	3	5	3	–	–

== Schedule and results ==
Date	Opponent	Site	Result	Record
Regular Season
January 10	vs. Ramsey Tech*	Hippodrome • Saint Paul, Minnesota	W 6–1	1–0–0
January 15	vs. St. Thomas*	Hippodrome • Saint Paul, Minnesota	W 4–0	2–0–0
January 22	Michigan*	Hippodrome • Saint Paul, Minnesota	W 2–0	3–0–0
January 23	Michigan*	Hippodrome • Saint Paul, Minnesota	W 3–0	4–0–0
February 9	at Wisconsin*	UW Ice Rink • Madison, Wisconsin	W 4–0	5–0–0
February 10	at Wisconsin*	UW Ice Rink • Madison, Wisconsin	T 1–1 ^{OT}	5–0–1
February 16	at Michigan*	Weinberg Coliseum • Ann Arbor, Michigan	W 6–3	6–0–1
February 17	at Michigan*	Weinberg Coliseum • Ann Arbor, Michigan	L 2–3	6–1–1
February 22	at Marquette*	Arena Ice Gardens • Milwaukee, Wisconsin	W 3–2	7–1–1
February 23	at Marquette*	Arena Ice Gardens • Milwaukee, Wisconsin	W 4–2	8–1–1
February 28	Wisconsin*	Hippodrome • Saint Paul, Minnesota	W 3–2	9–1–1
March 1	Wisconsin*	Hippodrome • Saint Paul, Minnesota	W 4–0	10–1–1
*Non-conference game. ^{#}Rankings from USCHO.com Poll.
