= 1922–23 Notre Dame Fighting Irish men's ice hockey season =

- Conference: Independent
- Home ice: Badin Hall Rink

Record
- Overall: 7–2–0
- Home: 2–0–0
- Road: 5–2–0

Coaches and captains
- Head coach: Paul Castner
- Captain: Percy Wilcox

The 1922–23 Notre Dame Fighting Irish men's ice hockey season was the 6th season of play for the program. The team was coached by Paul Castner in his 4th season.

== Season ==
Hopes were high for the program as it entered its 6th season. With an intercollegiate title already under its belt, the Irish hockey team was gearing up for another run when they encountered a common problem for many colleges; poor weather conditions. Because Notre Dame home venue, built next to Badin Hall, was an-open air rink, no amount of planning or preparation could stop warm weather from derailing a season. ND had started the year with designs on an eastern road trip to establish themselves as a national power rather than just a regional one but with the team unable to practice, all of those idea were discarded and the club scrambled to find some way to get on the ice.

Notre Dame wasn't able to play its first game until early February and the team looked out of sorts. Against Culver Academies, a local prep school, the Irish struggled to score and needed overtime to settle matters. Fortunately, Notre Dame escaped with a win. The team then managed to convince Michigan to take a leap of faith and come to South Bend for a match. The Irish, who had been able to get a decent amount of practice in ahead of time, looked far better against the Wolverines. Tom Lieb starred in goal, turning aside several scoring chances while Spike Flinn, Frank McSorley and Norm Feltes chipped in enough goals for the Irish to carry the day.

Just two days later, the team began an extended road trip and first headed up to Minnesota. While the team had initially scheduled the Gophers as an opponent, their hastily rearranged slate put an end to those plans. Instead, the Irish opened their road swing with a match against St. Thomas and they found themselves in a tough fight. Castner made his first appearance of the season and he was buoyed by stellar play from Percy Wilcox but the Irish could not solve the Tommies' defense and lost 1–2. It was the first intercollegiate loss for the Irish in over two years and, because they didn't play the Minnesota Gophers, put them in jeopardy of losing their crown. Seemingly reinvigorated by their precarious position, Caster's hat-trick the following evening led Notre Dame to a win.

Two days later, Notre Dame was in Houghton, Michigan taking on the Michigan College of Mines. Flinn and Wilcox were staunch in their defensive efforts holding the Huskies to just 3 goals in 2 games. Meanwhile, Castner continued his offensive heroics and led the Irish to a pair of easy victories. The team took a bit of a rest afterwards before swinging down to Ann Arbor. In the rematch with the Wolverines, Castner netted 4 goals and was by far the best player on the ice. The following day saw the team make a short jaunt across the border and play in their first international game when they took on Assumption. Castner was equal to the task, recording a hat-trick in the game but the rest of the Irish were overmatched. Notre Dame had its worst defensive performance of the season and allowed 6 goals to the home team. Fortunately, the game did not affect Notre Dame's chances for the intercollegiate crown as the Irish still only had one loss domestically. Notre Dame returned home that night and ended their season with a rematch against St. Thomas. The game was just as tight as the earlier match and ended with the same score, fortunately, this time the Irish were able to come away as the victors.

Notre Dame had an enviable record, however, the Irish had a problem. Both Notre Dame and Minnesota had just one loss on the year. While the Gophers had a tie, they also had more wins to their credit. Compounding matters, Minnesota had wins in all of their season series while Notre Dame was tied with St. Thomas 1–1. That final factor tipped the scales in favor of the Gophers and left Notre Dame as the runners up for the Western Intercollegiate Championship.

== Roster ==
No.	Nat.	Player	Class	Pos	Height	Weight	DoB	Hometown	Previous team
	(Canada)	Theodore Bullard		LW				Seaforth, Ontario
	(United States)	Paul H. Castner	Senior	C			1897-02-16	Saint Paul, Minnesota
	(United States)	Richard Eldridge		RW				Saint Paul, Minnesota
	(United States)	Norman Feltes		LW				South Bend, Indiana
	(United States)	Neil Flinn		D				Superior, Wisconsin
	(Canada)	Anthony Gorman		RW				Edmonton, Alberta
		John Lebel		C
	(United States)	Thomas J. Lieb	Senior	G			1899-10-28	Faribault, Minnesota
	(United States)	Franklin McSorley	Sophomore	C				Pittsburgh, Pennsylvania
	(United States)	James Stack		C				Saint Paul, Minnesota
	(Canada)	Gerald Timmins		D				Montreal, Quebec
	(United States)	James Wilcox (C)		D				Laurium, Michigan

== Standings ==
1922–23 Western Collegiate ice hockey standings
	Intercollegiate							Overall					
	GP	W	L	T	Pct.	GF	GA	GP	W	L	T	GF	GA
A.T. Still	–	–	–	–	–	–	–	–	–	–	–	–	–
Carleton	1	0	1	0	.000	1	4	2	0	2	0	4	14
Hamline	1	1	0	0	1.000	4	1	2	1	1	0	5	3
Marquette	5	0	3	2	.200	8	13	5	0	3	2	8	13
Michigan	10	4	6	0	.400	13	23	11	4	7	0	14	27
Michigan College of Mines	4	0	4	0	.000	8	22	4	0	4	0	8	22
Minnesota	11	9	1	1	.864	36	13	12	10	1	1	42	14
Notre Dame	7	6	1	0	.857	25	11	9	7	2	0	30	18
St. Thomas	6	3	3	0	.500	17	14	9	5	4	0	22	15
Wisconsin	–	–	–	–	–	–	–	11	3	5	3	–	–

== Schedule and results ==
Date	Opponent	Site	Result	Record
Regular Season
February 3	at Culver Military Academy*	CMA Rink • Culver, Indiana	W 2–1 ^{2OT}	1–0–0
February 4	Michigan*	Badin Hall Rink • Notre Dame, Indiana	W 3–2	2–0–0
February 12	at St. Thomas*	Hippodrome • Saint Paul, Minnesota	L 1–2	2–1–0
February 13	at Ramsey Tech*	Hippodrome • Saint Paul, Minnesota	W 4–2	3–1–0
February 15	at Michigan College of Mines*	Amphidrome • Houghton, Michigan	W 5–2	4–1–0
February 16	at Michigan College of Mines*	Amphidrome • Houghton, Michigan	W 5–1	5–1–0
February 22	at Michigan*	Weinberg Coliseum • Ann Arbor, Michigan	W 5–1	6–1–0
February 23	at Assumption*	McDougall Rink • Windsor, Ontario	L 3–6	6–2–0
February 24	St. Thomas*	Badin Hall Rink • Notre Dame, Indiana	W 2–1	7–2–0
*Non-conference game.
