= 1921–22 Wisconsin Badgers men's ice hockey season =

- Conference: Independent
- Home ice: UW Ice Rink

Record
- Overall: 0–8–0
- Home: 0–5–0
- Road: 0–3–0

Coaches and captains
- Head coach: A. K. Viner
- Captain: Gilbert Grieve

The 1921–22 Wisconsin Badgers men's ice hockey season was the inaugural season of play for the program. The Badgers represent the University of Wisconsin–Madison and were coached by A. K. Viner in his 1st season.

== Season ==
After having previously fielded a club team, the school's athletic council agreed to promote the ice hockey team to 'minor' varsity status in 1921. Dr. A. K. Viner was brought in to lead the inaugural team and practice began on the new ice rink which was constructed on the lower campus by flooding one of the athletic fields.

The team was able to arrange a slate of eight games and had their work cut out for them. The strong competition began at the season's outset when they played host to the Milwaukee Athletic Club. In front of a large crowd for the first game, the Badgers fell to the amateur club but the defense performed admirably after some early jitters. Minnesota arrived the following weekend and the defense remained in fine form, holding the Gophers to 3 goals in each game. Unfortunately, the Wisconsin offense had yet to appear and could only muster a single goal in the two matches.

After a week off, the team travelled north to play its first road games in a return series with Minnesota. This time, the northerners made sure to leave no doubt as to who were the better squad by hammering the Badgers in both games. Minnesota scored 19 goals in the two games to just 2 from Wisconsin and swept the first ever season series between the two Big Ten teams.

Wisconsin returned home and awaited their first series with Michigan, who had yet to officially recognize their team. While the games weren't official, they still resulted in another two losses for Wisconsin. One silver lining for the Badgers was that their offense finally seemed like it was beginning to work together. The final game of the year came against the yet-undefeated Notre Dame squad and the Irish kept their streak alive with a shutout victory over the Badgers.

== Roster ==
No.	Nat.	Player	Class	Pos	Height	Weight	DoB	Hometown	Previous team
	(United States)	Oscar R. Baker	Senior	C				St. Croix Falls, Wisconsin
	(United States)	Robert O. Blodgett	Junior	D				Saint Paul, Minnesota
	(United States)	Howard R. Comebacker	Junior	LW				Osceola, Wisconsin
		George R. Fisk	Sophomore
	(United States)	Gilbert G. Grieve (C)	Senior	RW				Madison, Wisconsin
	(United States)	Thomas A. Treadwell	Junior	G				Brooklyn, New York
		Willis Woods		D

== Standings ==
1921–22 Western Collegiate ice hockey standings
	Intercollegiate							Overall					
	GP	W	L	T	Pct.	GF	GA	GP	W	L	T	GF	GA
Michigan Agricultural	2	0	2	0	.000	1	14	4	0	4	0	2	28
Michigan College of Mines	9	6	2	1	.722	22	15	12	8	3	1	33	22
Minnesota	10	6	3	1	.650	35	16	10	6	3	1	35	16
Notre Dame	5	5	0	0	1.000	23	3	11	8	2	1	61	26
Wisconsin	7	0	7	0	.000	7	39	8	0	8	0	8	43

== Schedule and results ==
Date	Opponent	Site	Result	Record
Regular Season
January 14	Milwaukee Athletic Club*	UW Ice Rink • Madison, Wisconsin	L 1–4	0–1–0
January 20	Minnesota*	UW Ice Rink • Madison, Wisconsin	L 0–3	0–2–0
January 21	Minnesota*	UW Ice Rink • Madison, Wisconsin	L 1–3	0–3–0
February 3	at Minnesota*	Lexington Park • Saint Paul, Minnesota	L 2–12	0–4–0
February 4	at Minnesota*	Lexington Park • Saint Paul, Minnesota	L 0–7	0–5–0
February 13	Michigan ^{†}*	UW Ice Rink • Madison, Wisconsin	L 3–6	0–6–0
February 14	Michigan ^{†}*	UW Ice Rink • Madison, Wisconsin	L 1–5	0–7–0
February 18	at Notre Dame*	South Bend, Indiana	L 0–3	0–8–0
*Non-conference game. ^{#}Rankings from USCHO.com Poll. Source:

† Michigan did not field a varsity team at this time.
