= 1922–23 Michigan College of Mines Huskies men's ice hockey season =

- Conference: Independent

Record
- Overall: 0–4–0
- Home: 0–2–0
- Road: 0–2–0

Coaches and captains
- Head coach: Bill Murdoch
- Captain: Doug York

The 1922–23 Michigan College of Mines Huskies men's ice hockey season was the 4th season of play for the program. The Huskies were coached by Bill Murdoch in his 1st season.

== Season ==
For the fourth consecutive season, the Huskies were led by a new head coach. The change in leadership, however, was the least of the team's worries. After a stellar 12-game campaign the year before, MCM was limited to just 4 games for the entire season and lost every single match. After starting late, the team lost a home stand to Notre Dame. Since the Irish were one of the better teams at the time, that was hardly a black mark on the program. A couple of weeks later, however, the team was swept by St. Thomas, who were a middling team at best. Bill Murdoch resigned as coach after the disastrous season.

== Roster ==
No.	Nat.	Player	Class	Pos	Height	Weight	DoB	Hometown	Previous team
		Doug York (C)		C

== Standings ==
1922–23 Western Collegiate ice hockey standings
	Intercollegiate							Overall					
	GP	W	L	T	Pct.	GF	GA	GP	W	L	T	GF	GA
A.T. Still	–	–	–	–	–	–	–	–	–	–	–	–	–
Carleton	1	0	1	0	.000	1	4	2	0	2	0	4	14
Hamline	1	1	0	0	1.000	4	1	2	1	1	0	5	3
Marquette	5	0	3	2	.200	8	13	5	0	3	2	8	13
Michigan	10	4	6	0	.400	13	23	11	4	7	0	14	27
Michigan College of Mines	4	0	4	0	.000	8	22	4	0	4	0	8	22
Minnesota	11	9	1	1	.864	36	13	12	10	1	1	42	14
Notre Dame	7	6	1	0	.857	25	11	9	7	2	0	30	18
St. Thomas	6	3	3	0	.500	17	14	9	5	4	0	22	15
Wisconsin	–	–	–	–	–	–	–	11	3	5	3	–	–

== Schedule and results ==
Date	Opponent	Site	Result	Record
Regular Season
February 15	Notre Dame*	Amphidrome • Houghton, Michigan ^{‡}	L 2–5	0–1–0
February 16	Notre Dame*	Amphidrome • Houghton, Michigan ^{‡}	L 1–5	0–2–0
February 26	St. Thomas*	Amphidrome • Houghton, Michigan ^{‡}	L 2–5	0–3–0
February 27	St. Thomas*	Amphidrome • Houghton, Michigan ^{‡}	L 3–7	0–4–0
*Non-conference game.

‡ Michigan Tech lists their games being played on the road this season, however, contemporary accounts have all matches taking place at Houghton.
