= 1923–24 Marquette Blue and Gold men's ice hockey season =

American college hockey season

- Conference: Independent
- Home ice: Arena Ice Gardens

Record
- Overall: 3–5–0
- Home: 2–2–0
- Road: 1–3–0

Coaches and captains
- Head coach: Jake Thomsen
- Captain: Harold Garry

The 1923–24 Marquette Blue and Gold men's ice hockey season was the 2nd season of play for the program.

== Season ==
In Marquette's second season, the team brought in a new head coach but he was in a rather charmed position as he didn't have to build a team from scratch. Most players from the previous year returned and this time the squad was able to get an early start on practice. There were some lineup changes, with the previous year's captain "Red" Collopy moving to center, swapping positions with Nic Carle. The move worked to perfection in the first game as the Blue and Gold earned the program's first win. The next week they took on Minnesota and, while both games were 1-goal contests, they ended in favor of the Gophers. The team was able to stop every Maroon player except for Frank Pond, who scored all three goals for the visitors.

The next weekend, Marquette travelled to Culver, Indiana to play the local military academy, however, many of the regular players missed the train and the team was forced to play with a makeshift lineup. The hastily cobbled-together team had a lead late but surrendered two goals in the final three minutes and came up short. After a week off Marquette travelled to Minnesota to take on the Golden Gophers again but the team couldn't catch a break; not only was all of their equipment lost on the ride north, but the team's starting goaltender Harold Garry was injured early in the first match.

In the team's final two games they were able to win both against Wisconsin despite missing Garry again for the second match.

Dave Delaney, who played the year before, served as the team's manager.

== Roster ==
| No. | Nat. | Player | Class | Pos | Height | Weight | DoB | Hometown | Previous team |
|---|---|---|---|---|---|---|---|---|---|
| | (United States) | Nicholas B. Carle | Junior | D | | | | Duluth, Minnesota |
| | (United States) | John F. Collopy | Junior | C | | | | Milwaukee, Wisconsin |
| | (United States) | Gordon J. Corcoran | Sophomore | D | | | | Escanaba, Michigan |
| | (United States) | Harold Garry (C) | Senior | G | | | | Milwaukee, Wisconsin |
| | (United States) | Elmer L. Haase | Sophomore | D | | | | Milwaukee, Wisconsin |
| | (United States) | Arthur L. La Belle | Sophomore | W | | | | Chicago, Illinois |
| | (United States) | Arthur J. Montagne | Junior | G/D | | | | Detroit, Michigan |
| | (United States) | Gorden E. Thomas | Sophomore | W | | | | Virginia, Minnesota |
| | (United States) | Russell L. Van Holland | Senior | W | | | | Osceola, Wisconsin |

== Standings ==
1923–24 Western Collegiate ice hockey standings
| | Intercollegiate | | | | | | | Overall | | | | | |
| | GP | W | L | T | Pct. | GF | GA | GP | W | L | T | GF | GA |
|---|---|---|---|---|---|---|---|---|---|---|---|---|---|
| A.T. Still | – | – | – | – | – | – | – | – | – | – | – | – | – |
| Marquette | 7 | 3 | 4 | 0 | .429 | 10 | 13 | 8 | 3 | 5 | 0 | 11 | 15 |
| Michigan | – | – | – | – | – | – | – | 11 | 6 | 4 | 1 | 24 | 24 |
| Michigan College of Mines | 0 | 0 | 0 | 0 | – | 0 | 0 | 5 | 0 | 5 | 0 | – | – |
| Minnesota | – | – | – | – | – | – | – | 14 | 13 | 1 | 0 | – | – |
| Notre Dame | 2 | 0 | 2 | 0 | .000 | 2 | 5 | 5 | 0 | 5 | 0 | 5 | 20 |
| Wisconsin | – | – | – | – | – | – | – | 13 | 3 | 9 | 1 | – | – |

== Schedule and results ==
| Date | Opponent | Site | Result | Record |
Regular season
| January 12 | at Wisconsin* | UW Ice Rink • Madison, Wisconsin | W 4–1 | 1–0–0 |
| January 18 | Minnesota* | Arena Ice Gardens • Milwaukee, Wisconsin | L 0–1 | 1–1–0 |
| January 19 | Minnesota* | Arena Ice Gardens • Milwaukee, Wisconsin | L 0–1 | 1–2–0 |
| January 25 | at Culver Military Academy* | Lake Maxinkuckee • Culver, Indiana | L 1–2 | 1–3–0 |
| February 8 | at Minnesota* | Hippodrome • Saint Paul, Minnesota | L 0–6 | 1–4–0 |
| February 9 | at Minnesota* | Hippodrome • Saint Paul, Minnesota | L 1–3 | 1–5–0 |
| February 22 | Wisconsin* | Arena Ice Gardens • Milwaukee, Wisconsin | W 3–0^{†} | 2–5–0 |
| February 23 | Wisconsin* | Arena Ice Gardens • Milwaukee, Wisconsin | W 2–1 | 3–5–0 |
*Non-conference game.

† Wisconsin records record this as a win for the Badgers, however, contemporary accounts list Marquette as the victor.
