= 1922–23 Marquette Blue and Gold men's ice hockey season =

American college hockey season

- Conference: Independent
- Home ice: Arena Ice Gardens

Record
- Overall: 0–3–2
- Home: 0–2–2
- Road: 0–1–0

Coaches and captains
- Head coach: George Grady
- Captain: John Collopy

The 1922–23 Marquette Blue and Gold men's ice hockey season was the inaugural season of play for the program.

== Season ==
Joining in with other midwestern schools, Marquette founded their program in 1922. The first order of business was hiring a coach and the administration was advised to hire George Grady. "Buck" was a Canadian who had played collegiately at the University of Saskatchewan before serving in the military during World War I. After the war he began coaching hockey and was player/coach of a team in Chicago when he accepted the position.

A team was quickly assembled with most players coming from the college of dental surgery. The first game was played against nearby Wisconsin and, though a loss, the team acquitted themselves well. The next two games versus Minnesota were the first home games for the Blue and Gold. Though they lost both, they were able to keep the score close against the Western Intercollegiate Champions. Marquette took that experience into the two final games against Wisconsin and were able to earn back-to-back ties. In the first of those two matches, tragedy nearly struck when goaltender Harold Garry collapsed during intermission. While he eventually recovered, Montagne was forced to take his place in goal. Dave Delaney was a late addition to the team, dealing with a knee injury, but made it into the lineup after Garry was forced to withdraw.

== Roster ==
No.	Nat.	Player	Class	Pos	Height	Weight	DoB	Hometown	Previous team
	(United States)	Joseph H. Brielmaier	Freshman	D				Milwaukee, Wisconsin
	(United States)	Nicholas B. Carle	Sophomore	C				Duluth, Minnesota
	(United States)	John F. Collopy (C)	Sophomore	D				Milwaukee, Wisconsin
	(United States)	David M. Delaney	Junior	D				Milwaukee, Wisconsin
	(United States)	Harold Garry	Junior	G				Milwaukee, Wisconsin
	(United States)	Arthur J. Montagne	Sophomore	G/D				Detroit, Michigan
	(United States)	Gordon E. Thomas	Freshman	W				Virginia, Minnesota
	(United States)	Russell L. Van Holland	Junior	W				Osceola, Wisconsin

== Standings ==
1922–23 Western Collegiate ice hockey standings
	Intercollegiate							Overall					
	GP	W	L	T	Pct.	GF	GA	GP	W	L	T	GF	GA
A.T. Still	–	–	–	–	–	–	–	–	–	–	–	–	–
Carleton	1	0	1	0	.000	1	4	2	0	2	0	4	14
Hamline	1	1	0	0	1.000	4	1	2	1	1	0	5	3
Marquette	5	0	3	2	.200	8	13	5	0	3	2	8	13
Michigan	10	4	6	0	.400	13	23	11	4	7	0	14	27
Michigan College of Mines	4	0	4	0	.000	8	22	4	0	4	0	8	22
Minnesota	11	9	1	1	.864	36	13	12	10	1	1	42	14
Notre Dame	7	6	1	0	.857	25	11	9	7	2	0	30	18
St. Thomas	6	3	3	0	.500	17	14	9	5	4	0	22	15
Wisconsin	–	–	–	–	–	–	–	11	3	5	3	–	–

== Schedule and results ==
Date	Opponent	Site	Result	Record
Regular season
February 17	at Wisconsin*	Madison, Wisconsin	L 1–3	0–1–0
February 22	Minnesota*	Arena Ice Gardens • Milwaukee, Wisconsin	L 2–3	0–2–0
February 23	Minnesota*	Arena Ice Gardens • Milwaukee, Wisconsin	L 2–4	0–3–0
March 2	Wisconsin*	Arena Ice Gardens • Milwaukee, Wisconsin	T 1–1 ^{2OT}	0–3–1
March 3	Wisconsin*	Arena Ice Gardens • Milwaukee, Wisconsin	T 2–2 ^{2OT}	0–3–2
*Non-conference game.
