= 1921–22 Notre Dame Fighting Irish men's ice hockey season =

Western Intercollegiate Champion
- Conference: Independent
- Home ice: Badin Hall Rink

Record
- Overall: 8–2–1
- Home: 4–1–1
- Road: 4–1–0

Coaches and captains
- Head coach: Paul Castner
- Captain: Spike Flinn

The 1921–22 Notre Dame Fighting Irish men's ice hockey season was the 5th season of play for the program. The team was coached by Paul Castner in his 3rd season.

== Season ==
With several other colleges founding ice hockey teams in 1921, Notre Dame was able to finally realize the goal they had set out to achieve in 1911. The Irish used the rink they had built next to Badin Hall to get the team ready for the season and opened with a pair of games in mid-January. The Irish travelled north and took on a strong Michigan squad. After the Wolverines opened the scoring, Paul Castner tied the game early in the second. The coach then assisted on team captain Spike Flinn's goal that knotted the score for a second time. The Notre Dame defense then firmed up and stopped any further scores, necessitating overtime to settle the account. Castner's second marker was the only goal of the extra session and gave the Irish the win. The following evening, the team had a slightly easier time against the Aggies. Soft ice kept the score low but couldn't stop ND from returning home with a pair of wins to their credit.

For the team's first home game of the year, they took on Culver Academies and completely lambasted the Cadets. The forward line effortlessly skated through the Culver defense and four players combined for 9 goals in the first half. The large crowd roared in approval when the Irish continued the assault by scoring 9 more goals in the second to produce the largest win in program history. The team was still riding high when they welcomed the Michigan Aggies for a return match and banished the greens with an 11–0 win. The team continued its undefeated streak going when they travelled up to face Michigan College of Mines for a pair of matches. The first game was a fairly easy win for the Irish with Castner's hat-trick leading the way. MCM pushed back in the second and the Notre Dame defense was once more called upon to save the day and give McSorley enough time to net he overtime winner.

Notre Dame suffered its first loss of the year when the Canadian Club of Chicago arrived in town. Before the largest audience of the season, a warm spell had softened the ice and turned the game into more of a shinny match. Several times the visitors resorted to using golf shots to move the puck and ended up slapping the puck into the Notre Dame cage four times in this manner. The warm spell also caused the return game with Michigan to be postponed but it was eventually played a week later when the weather was more accommodating. With the Irish still undefeated against intercollegiate opponents, they were all but guaranteed the title if they could overcome the Wolverines a second time. The visitors sought to avenge their earlier loss and both teams battled hard on both ends of the ice. Wilcox and Caster raced up and down the ice and had the Irish in the lead late in the third period. However, Michigan would not go away and tied the score with just minutes to play, forcing the two into overtime once more. The rough ice did nothing to stop the Irish in the extra session and Caster scored twice to give his team a commanding lead. McSorley added one final goal before time was called and sent the Wolverines packing.

A rain storm was in attendance for the next game and turned the match with Wisconsin into a slushy quagmire. The poor conditions depressed the score but two more goals from Caster ultimately led the Irish to victory. The win ended Notre Dame intercollegiate schedule for the year and left the Irish as kings among the western schools.

Over a month later, the team headed to Milwaukee for two games against a local amateur club. The Irish didn't fare well in the series but the team had hardly been able to practice ahead of the matches, what with the Badin Rink having been long ago disassembled for the spring. The results did little to dent the season for Notre Dame as the team was still able to claim the first championship for western intercollegiate ice hockey.

== Roster ==
No.	Nat.	Player	Class	Pos	Height	Weight	DoB	Hometown	Previous team
	(United States)	Paul H. Castner	Junior	C			1897-02-16	Saint Paul, Minnesota
	(Canada)	Theodore Bullard		LW				Seaforth, Ontario
	(United States)	James Crowley		G				Green Bay, Wisconsin
	(United States)	Richard Eldridge		RW				Saint Paul, Minnesota
	(United States)	Norm Feltes		LW				South Bend, Indiana
	(United States)	Neil Flinn (C)		LW				Superior, Wisconsin
	(United States)	Edward Gibbs		RW				Saint Paul, Minnesota
	(Canada)	William Gilchrist		D				Sarnia, Ontario
	(Canada)	Anthony Gorman		D				Edmonton, Alberta
	(United States)	Franklin McSorley		RW				Pittsburgh, Pennsylvania
	(United States)	James Wilcox		D				Laurium, Michigan

== Standings ==
1921–22 Western Collegiate ice hockey standings
	Intercollegiate							Overall					
	GP	W	L	T	Pct.	GF	GA	GP	W	L	T	GF	GA
Michigan Agricultural	2	0	2	0	.000	1	14	4	0	4	0	2	28
Michigan College of Mines	9	6	2	1	.722	22	15	12	8	3	1	33	22
Minnesota	10	6	3	1	.650	35	16	10	6	3	1	35	16
Notre Dame	5	5	0	0	1.000	23	3	11	8	2	1	61	26
Wisconsin	7	0	7	0	.000	7	39	8	0	8	0	8	43

== Schedule and results ==
Date	Opponent	Site	Result	Record
Regular Season
January 17	at Michigan ^{†}*	Weinberg Coliseum • Ann Arbor, Michigan	W 3–2 ^{OT}	1–0–0
January 18	at Michigan Agricultural*	Red Cedar Rink • East Lansing, Michigan	W 3–1	2–0–0
January 21	Culver Military Academy*	Badin Hall Rink • Notre Dame, Indiana	W 18–1	3–0–0
January 26	Michigan Agricultural*	Badin Hall Rink • Notre Dame, Indiana	W 11–0	4–0–0
January 30	at Michigan College of Mines*	Amphidrome • Houghton, Michigan	W 4–1	5–0–0
January 31	at Michigan College of Mines*	Amphidrome • Houghton, Michigan	W 2–1 ^{OT}	6–0–0
February 4	Chicago Canadian Club*	Badin Hall Rink • Notre Dame, Indiana	L 3–5	6–1–0
February 14	Michigan ^{†}*	Badin Hall Rink • Notre Dame, Indiana	W 7–4 ^{OT}	7–1–0
February 18	Wisconsin*	Badin Hall Rink • Notre Dame, Indiana	W 3–0	8–1–0
March 25	at Milwaukee Dreuckers*	Castle Ice Gardens • Milwaukee, Wisconsin	T 5–5	8–1–1
March 26	at Milwaukee Dreuckers*	Castle Ice Gardens • Milwaukee, Wisconsin	L 1–6	8–2–1
*Non-conference game.

† Michigan did not field a varsity team at this time.
