= 1923–24 Notre Dame Fighting Irish men's ice hockey season =

- Conference: Independent
- Home ice: St. Mary's Lake

Record
- Overall: 0–5–0
- Home: 0–2–0
- Road: 0–3–0

Coaches and captains
- Head coach: Tom Lieb
- Captain: Frank McSorley

The 1923–24 Notre Dame Fighting Irish men's ice hockey season was the 7th season of play for the program. The team was coached by Tom Lieb in his 1st season.

== Season ==
With the departure of Paul Castner due to graduation, the leadership of the Notre Dame ice hockey team passed to Tom Lieb. Lieb had also graduated but he stuck around to earn a graduate degree and accepted the role on top of duties as an assistant with the football team. The bigger question for the team was how it would move forward after losing several of its top players. Aside from Castner, the Irish would also need to replace Percy Wilcox and Spike Flinn. The task of leading the team fell to Frank McSorley and the captain sought to keep Notre Dame as one of the top western teams.

The first match at Michigan was a good test for the inexperience Irish and the defense was at least up to par. Notre Dame held the Wolverines off of the scoresheet for the first half and look every bit the match of the favored home team. Though ND fell 1–3, the team was well positioned to have a good season. The following week the Irish took a road trip to Pittsburgh to play a local semi-pro team. The Irish didn't play as well as they had against Michigan but the strength of their opponent made those results far from disappointing.

When Notre Dame returned home they found that the weather had once again interfered with the team's plans. The rink at Badin Hall was unusable and they had to scramble to find a suitable alternative. A rink was hastily built atop St. Mary's Lake to the west of campus and by the time the amateur club from Chicago arrived, the team had hardly been able to get in any practice time. The visitors skated rings around the Irish and handed the team another defeat. Michigan arrived for a rematch after the exam break and got off to a quick start with 2 goals in the opening frame. While the Irish were able to net one in the period, the Wolverines played the rest of the match using 4 players as defensemen. Despite the best efforts, the Irish were unable to pierce through the stonewalling and fell 1–2.

Warming conditions made St. Mary's unusable afterwards and Notre Dame was unable to schedule any further games, leaving the team winless on the year.

== Roster ==
No.	Nat.	Player	Class	Pos	Height	Weight	DoB	Hometown	Previous team
	(Canada)	Theodore Bullard		LW				Seaforth, Ontario
	(United States)	Thomas Carfango		LW				New York, New York
	(United States)	James Egan		G				Springfield, Massachusetts
	(United States)	Norman Feltes		LW				South Bend, Indiana
	(United States)	Raymond Gillespie		G				Chippewa, Michigan
	(United States)	John S. Hicok	Freshman	LW				Hancock, Michigan
	(United States)	Robert Irmiger		RW				Chicago, Illinois
	(United States)	John Magie		C				Duluth, Minnesota
	(United States)	Charles Martin	Freshman	C/RW				Pittsburgh, Pennsylvania
	(United States)	Franklin McSorley (C)	Junior	C				Pittsburgh, Pennsylvania
	(United States)	Charles Mouch		D				Troy, Ohio
	(United States)	James Stack		C				Saint Paul, Minnesota
	(Canada)	Gerald Timmins	Sophomore	D				Montreal, Quebec

== Standings ==
1923–24 Western Collegiate ice hockey standings
	Intercollegiate							Overall					
	GP	W	L	T	Pct.	GF	GA	GP	W	L	T	GF	GA
A.T. Still	–	–	–	–	–	–	–	–	–	–	–	–	–
Marquette	7	3	4	0	.429	10	13	8	3	5	0	11	15
Michigan	–	–	–	–	–	–	–	11	6	4	1	24	24
Michigan College of Mines	0	0	0	0	–	0	0	5	0	5	0	–	–
Minnesota	–	–	–	–	–	–	–	14	13	1	0	–	–
Notre Dame	2	0	2	0	.000	2	5	5	0	5	0	5	20
Wisconsin	–	–	–	–	–	–	–	13	3	9	1	–	–

== Schedule and results ==
Date	Opponent	Site	Result	Record
Regular Season
January 12	at Michigan*	Weinberg Coliseum • Ann Arbor, Michigan	L 1–3	0–1–0
January 18	at Pittsburgh Athletic Club (Note: Called "Pittsburgh All-Collegians" in some sources.)*	Duquesne Garden • Pittsburgh, Pennsylvania	L 1–4	0–2–0
January 19	at Pittsburgh Athletic Club*	Duquesne Garden • Pittsburgh, Pennsylvania	L 1–6	0–3–0
January 26	Illinois Athletic Club*	St. Mary's Lake • South Bend, Indiana	L 1–5	0–4–0
February 8	Michigan*	St. Mary's Lake • South Bend, Indiana	L 1–2	0–5–0
*Non-conference game.
