= 1923–24 Michigan College of Mines Huskies men's ice hockey season =

- Conference: Independent

Record
- Overall: 0–5–0

Coaches and captains
- Head coach: Elmer Sicotte
- Captain: Andrew Jackson

The 1923–24 Michigan College of Mines Huskies men's ice hockey season was the 5th season of play for the program. The Huskies were coached by Elmer Sicotte in his 2nd season.

== Season ==
Michigan College of Mines continued to cycle through head coaches, however, Elmer Sicotte returned for his second tour of duty behind the bench. The team was hoping to recover from a winless season but warm weather caused the team to cancel all but five contests. The Huskies played one game a week for most of January but were forced to wait until the end of February before they could get in their final game. The team ended up being unable to play any other college during the season, being forced to play local amateur clubs to very little effect.

== Roster ==
No.	Nat.	Player	Class	Pos	Height	Weight	DoB	Hometown	Previous team
		Andrew Jackson (C)

== Standings ==
1923–24 Western Collegiate ice hockey standings
	Intercollegiate							Overall					
	GP	W	L	T	Pct.	GF	GA	GP	W	L	T	GF	GA
A.T. Still	–	–	–	–	–	–	–	–	–	–	–	–	–
Marquette	7	3	4	0	.429	10	13	8	3	5	0	11	15
Michigan	–	–	–	–	–	–	–	11	6	4	1	24	24
Michigan College of Mines	0	0	0	0	–	0	0	5	0	5	0	–	–
Minnesota	–	–	–	–	–	–	–	14	13	1	0	–	–
Notre Dame	2	0	2	0	.000	2	5	5	0	5	0	5	20
Wisconsin	–	–	–	–	–	–	–	13	3	9	1	–	–

== Schedule and results ==
Date	Opponent	Site	Result	Record
Regular Season
January 8	at Calumet*	Calumet Colosseum • Calumet, Michigan	L 2–6	0–1–0
January 15	at Laurium Ramboultown*	Laurium, Michigan	L 1–5	0–2–0
January 24	at Laurium Ramboultown*	Laurium, Michigan	L 1–5	0–3–0
February 28	at Keweenaw*	?	L 0–1	0–4–0
*Non-conference game.

Note: Michigan Tech records indicate 5 losses on the year, however, there is no indication of who the opponent was or when the game took place.
