= 1921–22 Michigan Agricultural Aggies men's ice hockey season =

- Conference: Independent
- Home ice: Red Cedar Rink

Record
- Overall: 0–4–0
- Home: 0–1–0
- Road: 0–3–0

Coaches and captains

The 1921–22 Michigan Agricultural Aggies men's ice hockey season was the inaugural season of play for the program. The Aggies represented Michigan Agricultural College.

== Season ==
In the winter of 1921, the athletic department at Michigan Agricultural College decided to add ice hockey to the list of minor varsity sport for the school. Due to the late announcement, the team scrambled to arrange a schedule with a decent number of games. more than half a dozen contests were initially put on the slate, however, due to poor weather conditions the team was only able to play 4 matches on the year.

While a temporary rink was built just above the dam on the Red Cedar River, Chester Brewer made a call for students to try out for the team and the roster was mostly populated by men from the upper peninsula and Canada. Neither a coach nor captain was elected for the season and the team had to rely on their own wits and experience in their abbreviated schedule. MAC had decent results in the first two games, but they were blown out in their rematches with Michigan and Notre Dame.

Doherty scored the first goal in the program's history against Michigan.

== Roster ==
No.	Nat.	Player	Class	Pos	Height	Weight	DoB	Hometown	Previous team
		Bowen
		Boyle
		Burris
		Crosby
		DeLisle
		Doherty
		Haupth
		Kotila
		MacDonald
		Moore
		Noblet

== Standings ==
1921–22 Western Collegiate ice hockey standings
	Intercollegiate							Overall					
	GP	W	L	T	Pct.	GF	GA	GP	W	L	T	GF	GA
Michigan Agricultural	2	0	2	0	.000	1	14	4	0	4	0	2	28
Michigan College of Mines	9	6	2	1	.722	22	15	12	8	3	1	33	22
Minnesota	10	6	3	1	.650	35	16	10	6	3	1	35	16
Notre Dame	5	5	0	0	1.000	23	3	11	8	2	1	61	26
Wisconsin	7	0	7	0	.000	7	39	8	0	8	0	8	43

== Schedule and results ==
Date	Opponent	Site	Result	Record
Regular Season
January 11	at Michigan ^{†}*	Weinberg Coliseum • Ann Arbor, Michigan	L 1–5	0–1–0
January 18	Notre Dame*	Red Cedar Rink • East Lansing, Michigan	L 1–3	0–2–0
January 26	at Notre Dame*	Badin Hall Rink • Notre Dame, Indiana	L 0–11	0–3–0
February 17	at Michigan ^{†}*	Weinberg Coliseum • Ann Arbor, Michigan	L 0–9	0–4–0
*Non-conference game.

† Michigan did not field a varsity team at this time.
