= Paul Castner =

American baseball player (1897–1986)

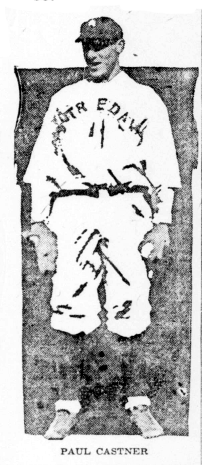
- Pitcher
- Born: February 16, 1897; Saint Paul, Minnesota, U.S.
- Died: March 3, 1986 (aged 89); Saint Paul, Minnesota, U.S.
- Batted: Left Threw: Left

MLB debut
- August 6, 1923, for the Chicago White Sox

Last MLB appearance
- October 2, 1923, for the Chicago White Sox

MLB statistics
- Win–loss record: 0–0
- Earned run average: 6.30
- Strikeouts: 0
- Stats at Baseball Reference

Teams
- Chicago White Sox (1923)

Paul Henry Castner (February 16, 1897 – March 3, 1986) was a professional baseball pitcher.

Castner played for the Notre Dame Fighting Irish football team as a fullback from 1919 to 1922, under Knute Rockne. He also played on the hockey and baseball teams. He appeared in six games in Major League Baseball for the Chicago White Sox in 1923, all in relief. In 10 innings pitched, Castner gave up 14 hits and 5 walks without striking out a batter.

He died on March 3, 1986, and is buried at Calvary Cemetery

== College Hockey Record ==
Statistics overview
Season	Team	Overall	Conference	Standing	Postseason
Notre Dame Fighting Irish Independent (1919–1923)
1919–20	Notre Dame	2–0–0			
1920–21	Notre Dame	2–1–0			
1921–22	Notre Dame	8–2–1			West Intercollegiate Champions
1922–23	Notre Dame	7–2–0			
Notre Dame:		19–5–1			
Total:		19–5–1			
National champion Postseason invitational champion Conference regular season champion Conference regular season and conference tournament champion Division regular season champion Division regular season and conference tournament champion Conference tournament champion

== Sources ==
- Career statistics from Baseball Reference · Retrosheet
