= UW Ice Rink =

- Interactive map of UW Ice Rink
- Location: Madison, Wisconsin 53706
- Coordinates: 43°04′33″N 89°23′56″W
- Owner: University of Wisconsin–Madison
- Operator: University of Wisconsin–Madison

Construction
- Opened: 1921 (104–105 years ago)
- Closed: ?

Tenant
- Wisconsin men's ice hockey 1921–1935

The UW Ice Rink was a temporary outdoor ice rink that was constructed each year on the campus of the University of Wisconsin–Madison. The structure was placed on the library mall, southwest of the college's Red Gym on the opposite side of the street.

== History ==
Wisconsin formed its first varsity ice hockey team for the 1921-22 season. For the inaugural year, the school erected a full-sized ice rink on the campus grounds immediately south of both the Memorial Union and Red Gym. The rink, which was deconstructed every year when the ice melted, was used by both the ice hockey team for games and practices as well as the students for intramural sports as well as public skating.

The ice hockey team used the rink from 1921 until 1935, when the club was suspended mostly due to the Great Depression. Afterwards, the rink remained a fixture on campus and was used by the fraternities to decide the intramural champion until at least the early 1940s. Mentions of the rink vanish during World War II, likely due to both student shortages and rationing. After the war, several events were described that could have taken place on the rink, such as the return of both intramural hockey and the winter carnival, but there is no specific indication as to where these events took place. As a result, the last time the UW Ice Rink was set up is unclear.

During the 1950s and 1960s, several indoor rinks were built in and around Madison. When the ice hockey team was brought back, they moved their games to the Hartmeyer Ice Arena, precluding the need for their open-air home.
