= Frank Pond =

American ice hockey player

Biographical details
- Born: December 15, 1900; Two Harbors, Minnesota, USA
- Died: April 1, 1993 (aged 92); Sun City, Arizona, USA
- Education: University of Minnesota

Playing career
- 1922–1924: Minnesota
- Position: Center

Coaching career (HC unless noted)
- 1930–1935: Minnesota

Head coaching record
- Overall: 49–24–4 (.662)

Accomplishments and honors

Championships
- 1923 West Intercollegiate Champion (player); 1924 West Intercollegiate Champion (player); 1932 West Intercollegiate Champion; 1933 West Intercollegiate Champion; 1934 West Intercollegiate Champion

Francis Raymond Pond was an American ice hockey center and coach. He led the University of Minnesota to consecutive intercollegiate championships both as a player and head coach in the 1920s and 30s.

== Career ==
A native Minnesotan, Pond began attending the state's flagship university in 1920. While the school had a club team at the time, the program was promoted to major varsity status during his sophomore year. Pond tried out for the team that year but was unable to make the cut. He made a second attempt the following year and earned a spot with the club. Pond helped the team finish atop the ranking of all western teams with a 10–1–1 record to earn the first Intercollegiate title for the program. He was elected team captain for his senior season and guided the Gophers to a second tile, going 13–1–0 and being regarded by some as the top team in the nation (though 14–1 Yale would beg to differ).

Pond returned to the team in 1930 as the team's head coach. Taking over after the resignation of Emil Iverson, Pond had a difficult first season, losing 7 of his first 9 games but got the team to improve as the year went along. The hard work paid off in his second season behind the bench when Minnesota won an intercollegiate title and finished 2nd in the national ranking behind only Harvard. He guided Minnesota to two more western titles over the next two years but a poor start in 1935 prevented the Gophers from being able to capture four straight crowns. After five seasons as coach, Pond resigned and left behind a sparkling legacy with the ice hockey program.

== Career statistics ==
			Regular season					Playoffs
Season	Team	League	GP	G	A	Pts	PIM	GP	G	A	Pts	PIM
1922–23	Minnesota	Independent	—	—	—	—	—	—	—	—	—	—
1923–24	Minnesota	Independent	14	10	3	13	2	—	—	—	—	—

Note: assists were not an official statistic at the time.

== Head coaching record ==
Record table
Season	Team	Overall	Conference	Standing	Postseason
Minnesota Golden Gophers Independent (1930–1935)
1930–31	Minnesota	7–11–1			
1931–32	Minnesota	12–3–1			West Intercollegiate Champion
1932–33	Minnesota	10–1–0			West Intercollegiate Champion
1933–34	Minnesota	11–3–0			West Intercollegiate Champion
1934–35	Minnesota	9–6–2			
Minnesota:		49–24–4			
Total:		49–24–4			
National champion Postseason invitational champion Conference regular season champion Conference regular season and conference tournament champion Division regular season champion Division regular season and conference tournament champion Conference tournament champion
