= Lexington Park =

Baseball park in St. Paul, Minnesota

- Interactive map of Lexington Park
- Full name: Lexington Park
- Location: St. Paul, Minnesota
- Coordinates: 44.954078°N 93.14886°W
- Owner: St. Paul Saints (1897–1956)
- Surface: Grass
- Field size: LF 315; CF 470; RF 365

Construction
- Built: 1897; 1916
- Closed: 1956
- Demolished: 1950s

Lexington Park was the name of a former minor league baseball park in St. Paul, Minnesota. It was the home of the St. Paul Saints from 1897 through 1956, when it was replaced by the first version of Midway Stadium.

Lexington Park was commissioned by baseball owner Charlie Comiskey to serve as home for his St. Paul Saints Western League baseball franchise. In late 1899 the league changed its name to the American League in an ultimately successful bid to gain major league status. While the Saints were initially a member of that league, Comiskey moved his team to Chicago prior to Opening Day 1900 (where they still exist today as the Chicago White Sox). As such, the ballpark holds at least the technical distinction of being the original home to a current American League franchise—even if, admittedly, the league wasn't major at the time, and not a single major league game was ever played there.

Comiskey continued to own the ballpark for another decade or so (leasing it out to a replacement American Association club), until finally selling it to local interests in 1909.

It was on the block bounded by Lexington Parkway, University Avenue, Fuller and Dunlap. Home plate was originally in the southwest corner of the block. Following a fire in November, 1915, a steel and concrete grandstand was built with the plate repositioned to the northwest corner. Lights were installed in 1937. The first night game was played on July 15, with the Saints hosting the arch-rival Minneapolis Millers. The teams played again the next night, at Nicollet Park's first night game.

The Saints defeated the Minneapolis Millers in the final game played at the ballpark before it closed indefinitely. The ballpark had been in use for around 6 decades at the time of its closure.

Although demolished in the 1950s, elements of the park remain in existence to this day. A significant segment of the southwestern foundation can still be seen by the knowledgeable observer, and as late as the 1990s a grocery store on the site (since demolished) preserved the location of Lexington's home plate with a distinctively-shaped commemorative floor tile.

The area is currently being redeveloped. An Aldi grocery store is one of the most recent additions to the site. According to Stew Thornley's 2006 book, a plaque that had once been affixed to the grocery store is now reinstated, at the TCF Bank branch building.
