= Dee Stadium =

Coordinates: 47°7′22.46″N 88°33′53.91″W

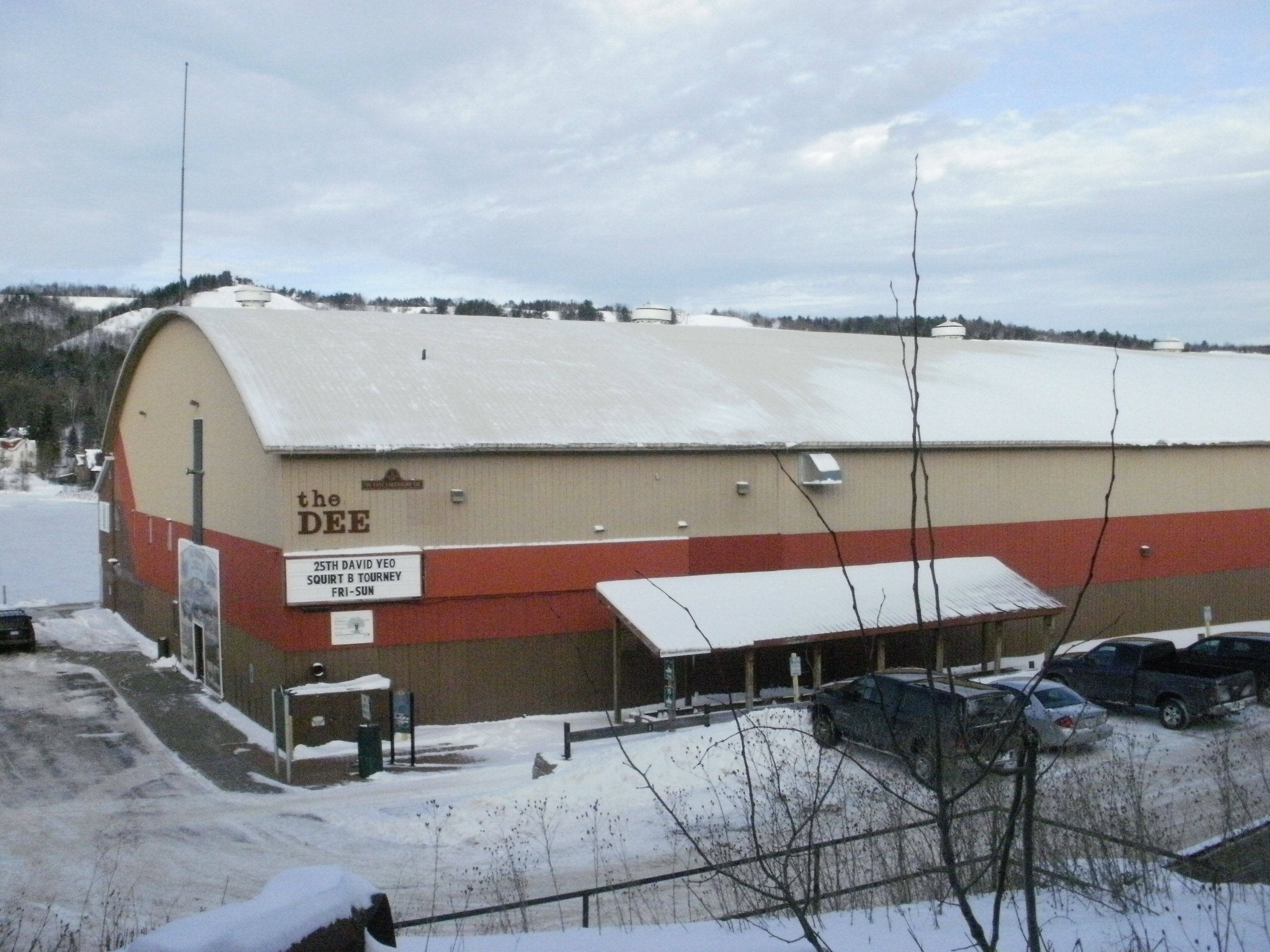
Dee Stadium in January 2012.

Dee Stadium, also called The Dee, is an ice hockey arena (~ 932 seats) in Houghton, Michigan, that replaced, and is located on the same site as, the Amphidrome. It is regarded as the birthplace of professional hockey, and is the seventh oldest indoor ice rink in the world.

== Amphidrome ==
Amphidrome
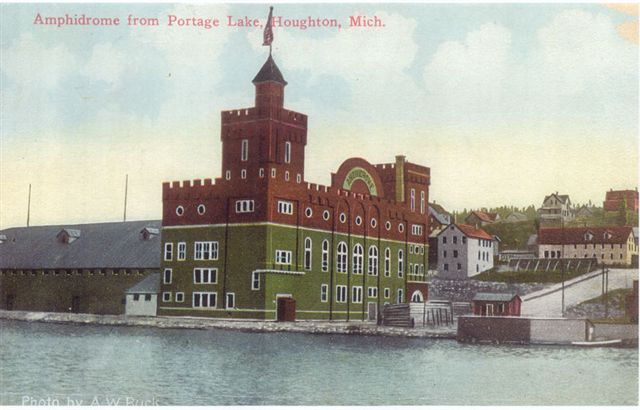
- The 1907 addition can be prominently seen in this postcard (circa 1907–09). The rest of the stadium is off to the left.
- Interactive map of Amphidrome

History
- Built: 1902

Site notes
- Owner: City of Houghton

Michigan State Historic Site
- Designated: ~2006

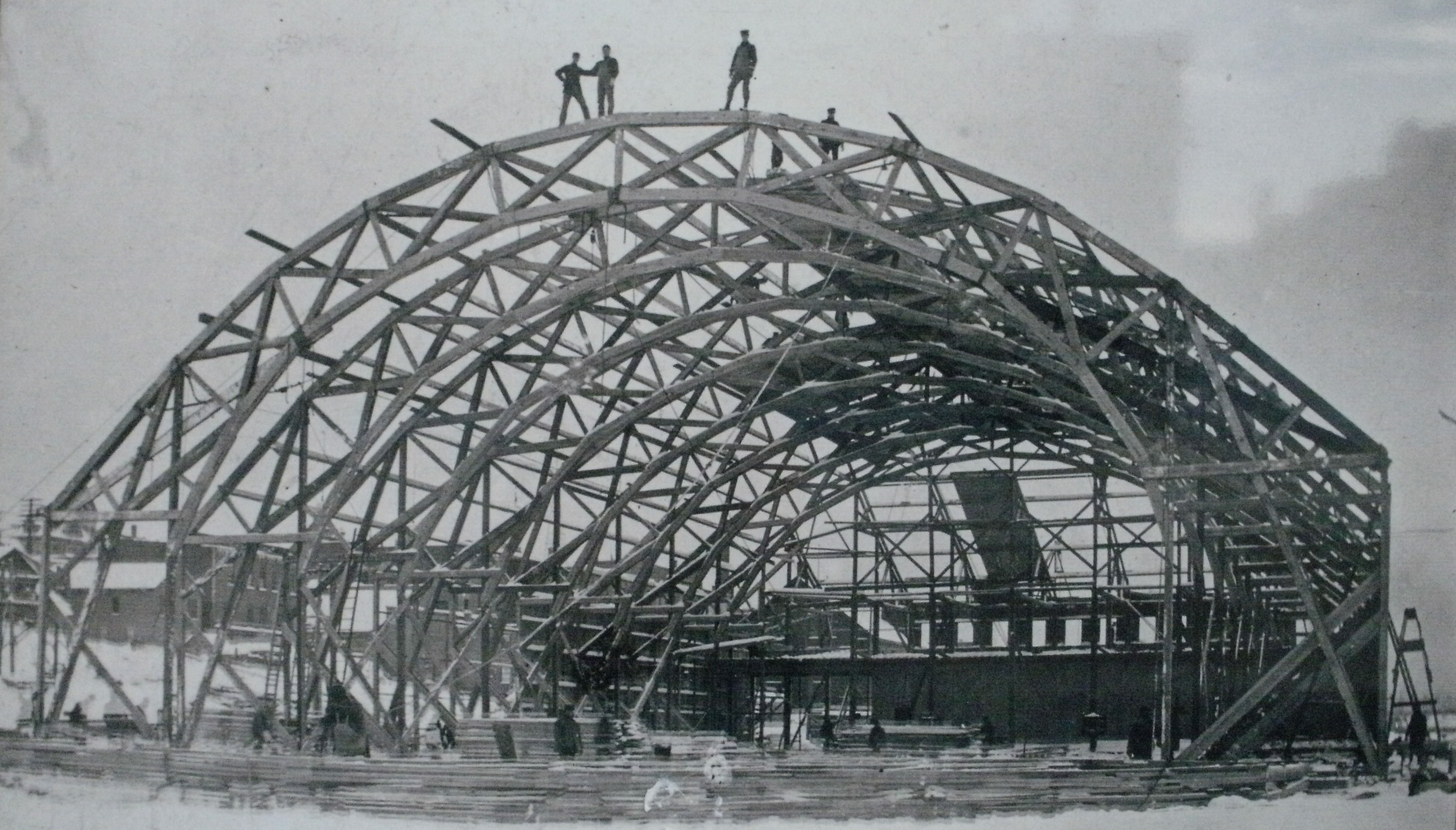
Amphidrome under construction

The Houghton Warehouse Company, operated by James R. Dee, built and owned the Amphidrome. Construction of the Amphidrome finished in December 1902.

The first hockey game was played on December 29, 1902, in which the Portage Lakes Hockey Club defeated the University of Toronto, 13–2. The game was attended by over 5,000 spectators. For the 1903–04 season, the Portage Lakes became the first hockey team whose players were all paid. James Dee and John "Doc" Gibson formed the International Hockey League later that year, in which the Portage Lakes competed. These events marked the beginning of professional hockey.

In 1907, an addition was constructed on the western end of the Amphidrome. Styled like a castle, it was used as a community ballroom and armory.

=== Fire ===
The Amphidrome burned down on January 9, 1927. The fire was discovered at 3:45 a.m. in the upper floors of the 1907 addition. The fire destroyed a nearby warehouse and the equipment of the Portage Lakes, the Michigan College of Mines hockey team, and the Houghton and Hancock high school sextets. The fire cancelled the regional high school hockey season and forced other area teams to use the Calumet Colosseum in Calumet, Michigan.

== Dee Stadium ==
=== History ===
After the loss of the Amphidrome, the debris was cleared and a temporary outdoor rink was formed. Before the next season, in 1928, a replacement stadium was constructed called the New Amphidrome. James Dee assisted in financing the reconstruction.

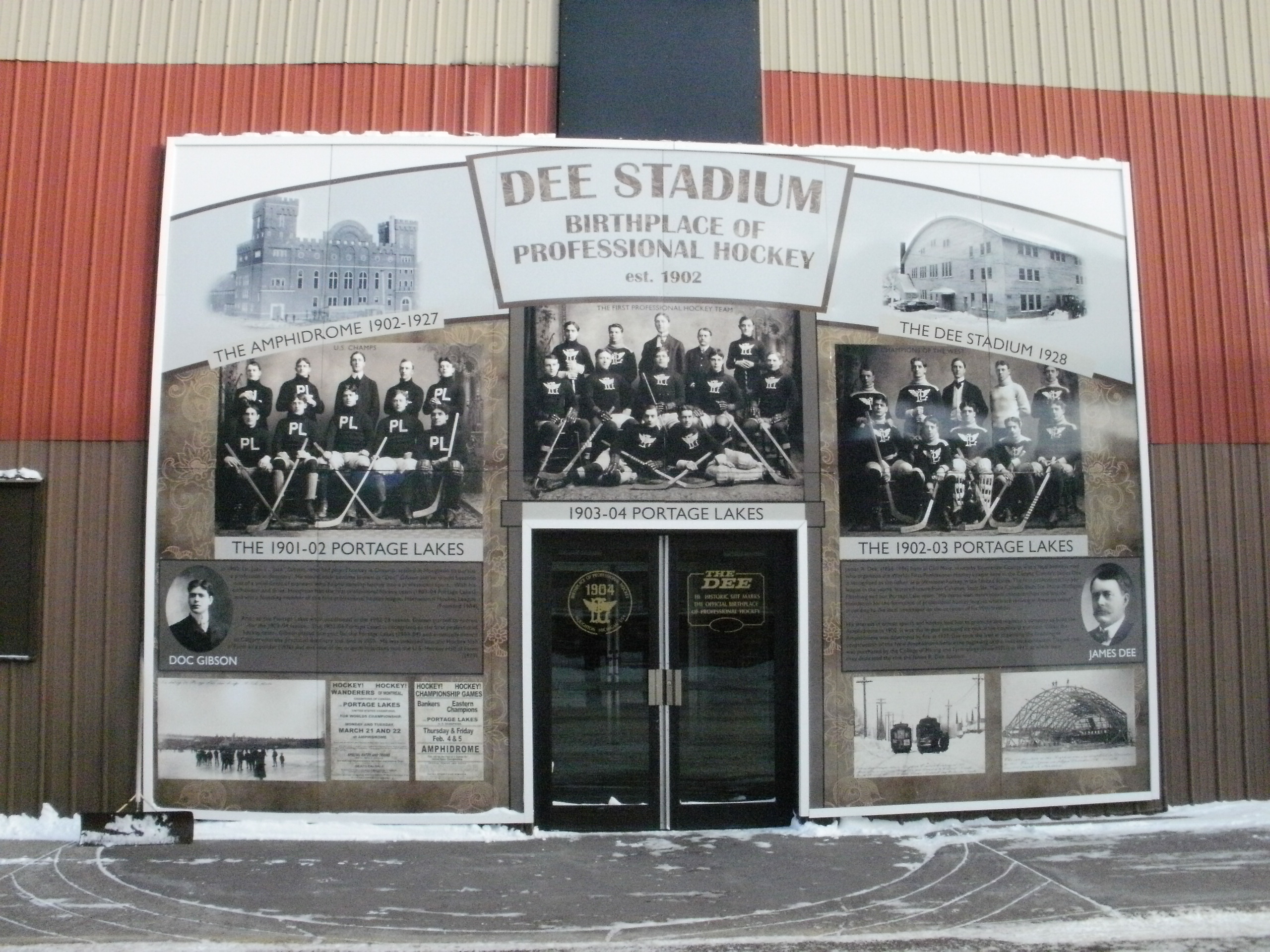
The Dee Stadium entrance displays some history of the building and site (January 2012).

The New Amphidrome was renamed the James R. "Dee" Ice Stadium in 1943 when the Michigan College of Mining and Technology (now Michigan Technological University) purchased it for their hockey team. Michigan Tech played their last hockey game in Dee Stadium on December 4, 1971, after which they moved to the Student Ice Arena.

In 1974, the City of Houghton signed a 99-year lease for the Dee Stadium from Michigan Tech. In May 1983, the City of Houghton eliminated Dee Stadium from their annual budget due to financial reasons and the recent vandalism at Dee Stadium. The Copper Country Junior Hockey Association (CCJHA) was blamed for the vandalism. The City of Houghton told The Daily Mining Gazette that the young hockey players were the reason the Dee is falling apart and that the city is not at fault for the condition of the Dee.

With the City threatening to close Dee stadium, 468 adults and 423 students signed a petition to keep the Dee open for use. The Houghton High School Hockey coach at the time Don Miller said, "By having to move to either Houghton County Arena or the Student Ice Arena, a severe scheduling problem would arise...especially the Houghton High School Hockey Team." All kinds of community groups got involved with the Dee petition. The Houghton-Portage Teachers Education Association expressed their interest in the situation by stating, "the teachers feel strongly about Dee Stadium and the purpose that it serves. For the next five years, there were fundraising efforts to save Dee Stadium from being closed". These fundraisers also provided Dee Stadium with the proper improvements that it needed. At each of these annual fund raising dinners, there were 200 tickets sold at $100 at ticket, which gained an $8,000 profit per year. The goal with this money was to put new siding on all four sides of the building and to put in new insulation to make the ballroom available for year-round use.

In 1988, the City of Houghton purchased the Dee Stadium.

=== Current use ===
Dee Stadium is the current home of the Houghton High School hockey team and Portage Lake Pioneers senior hockey team. It is a venue for Michigan Tech's Winter Carnival and the annual Parade of Nations festival.

=== Facilities ===
Upstairs at the Dee Stadium was the Level II skatepark. The park was originally built in 2000 and rebuilt in 2005. Besides having various ramps for skateboarding and biking they also had a stage for concerts. The park was closed due to waning interest.

The Dee Stadium houses a museum that showcases the history of the site and the history of ice hockey in the area.
