= St. Thomas Tommies (Minnesota) men's ice hockey =

- Current season
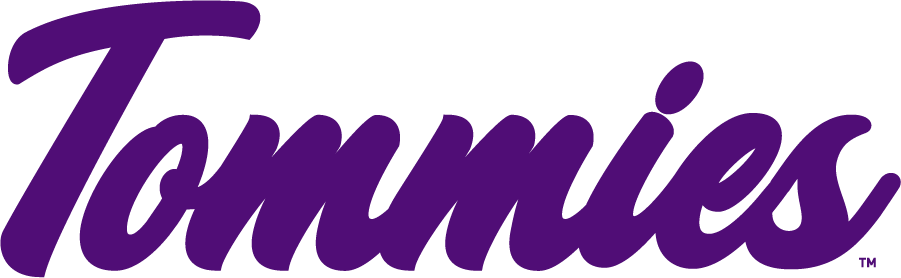
- University: University of St. Thomas (Minnesota)
- Conference: NCHC
- First season: 1920–21
- Head coach: Enrico Blasi; 5th season, 48–89–9 (.360)
- Assistant coaches: Karl Goehring; Leon Hayward; Cory Laylin
- Arena: Lee & Penny Anderson Arena; Saint Paul, Minnesota
- Colors: Purple and gray

NCAA tournament Frozen Four
- DIII: 2000, 2005

NCAA tournament appearances
- DIII: 1984, 1985, 1986, 1988, 1990, 1992, 1994, 1999, 2000, 2002, 2004, 2005, 2008, 2010, 2012, 2014, 2020

Conference tournament champions
- WIHA: 1984; MIAC: 1986, 1988, 1992, 1994, 1999, 2002, 2004, 2005, 2008, 2010, 2014, 2020

Conference regular season champions
- MIAC: 1923, 1934, 1938, 1940, 1941, 1942, 1947, 1949, 1951, 1952, 1953, 1974, 1983, 1985, 1986, 1989, 1990, 1991, 1992, 1993, 1994, 1995, 1998, 1999, 2000, 2001, 2002, 2006, 2012, 2013, 2014, 2015, 2017, 2018

The St. Thomas (Minnesota) Tommies men's ice hockey team represents the University of St. Thomas (Minnesota) in NCAA Division I ice hockey.

== History ==
St. Thomas is one of the oldest ice hockey programs in the nation, predating even Minnesota, having played their first varsity game in the 1920–21 season. That year St. Thomas, along with six other small Minnesota colleges, formed the Minnesota Intercollegiate Athletic Conference and began playing one another in many sports. Over the course of the first sixty five years, St. Thomas was one of the better teams in the conference but it became the leading program once Terry Skrypek arrived in 1987. In his 23 years with the program, Skrypek won 13 conference championships, 9 conference tournament titles and reached the NCAA Division III championship game twice.

In total during its time as a Division III program, the St. Thomas had more wins than any other program with 1,164 victories over 96 seasons. The Tommies won 34 conference titles, made 17 NCAA Tournament appearances and were twice national runners-up.

In 2019 the MIAC took the unprecedented step of removing St. Thomas from its membership because of concerns about “athletic competitive parity.” Because the removal affected all sports and was effective at the end of the 2020–21 season, St. Thomas had time to decide what it would do next. The men's ice hockey program was given the green light to jump directly to the Division I level in July 2020. Before the end of the month, the seven teams who had previously announced their intention to restart the CCHA with the 2021–22 season voted unanimously to accept the Tommies as the eighth member of the conference.

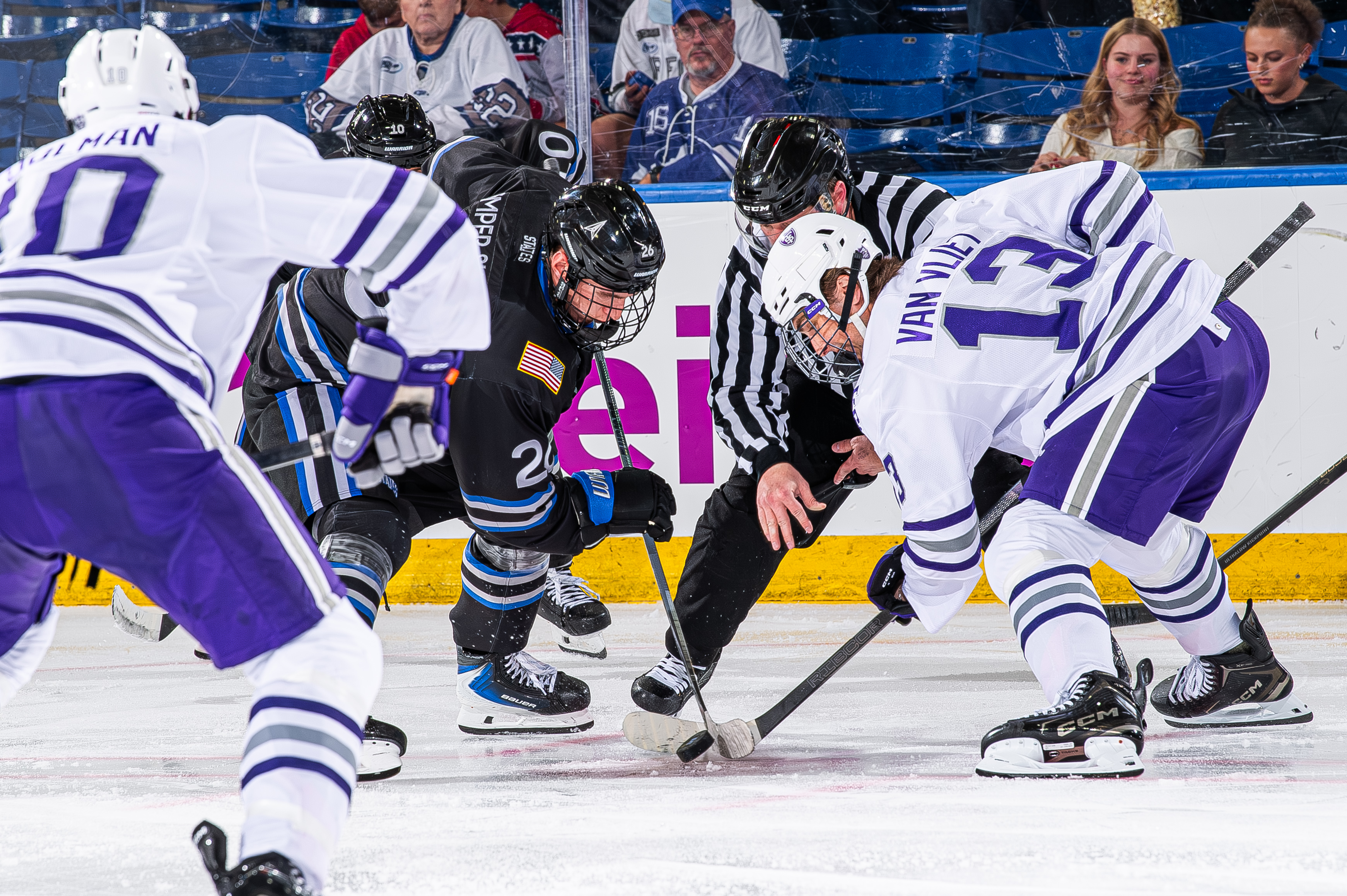
A face-off between St. Thomas and Air Force in 2025

Before the 2021–22 season, St. Thomas hired Rico Blasi to be their new head coach and bring them into their Division I era. The Tommies' first few seasons in Division I were rough, with the team only managing three wins in their first year. The Tommies would take their first step forward in the 2023–24 season, finishing 2nd in the CCHA, though they would be upset in the first round by 7th-seeded Lake Superior State. In the 2024–25 season, the Tommies finished with their first winning record in Division I, making it all the way to the CCHA Tournament Championship, before losing 2–4 to Minnesota State. In the 2025–26 season, St. Thomas opened the Lee and Penny Anderson Arena, replacing the, St. Thomas Ice Arena, one of the smallest rinks in Division I hockey at the time. The arena will officially hosted first hockey game on October 24, 2025, against Providence. Additionally, the 2025–26 season marked the Tommies' first season of full Division I eligibility, and the Tommies last season in the CCHA, before departing for the NCHC for the 2026–27 season.

== Season-by-season results ==
Source:

== Head coaches ==
As of completion of the 2024–25 season

Tenure	Coach	Years	Record	Pct.
1920–1921	Harold Dudley	1	6–1–0	.857
1921–1923, 1925–1926	Joe Brandy	3	19–9–0	.679
1923–1924	Dave Hayes	1	8–2–0	.800
1924–1925	Bill Houle	1	1–0–1	.750
1926–1927	Willard Faulk	1	5–9–0	.357
1927–1928	John O'Halloran	1	4–5–3	.458
1928–1930	Matt Coogan	2	15–13–0	.536
1930–1932	Frank Penas	2	7–7–4	.500
1932–1933	Joe Boland	1	7–3–0	.700
1933–1935	Frank Haider	2	6–6–1	.500
1935–1937	Frank Klingberg	2	12–10–3	.540
1937–1939	Leo McGuire	2	13–7–2	.636
1939–1942	Wee Walsh	3	18–3–3	.813
1946–1948	Tom Cunningham	2	20–9–0	.690
1948–1951, 1952–1955	Bill Funk	6	66–19–11	.745
1951–1952	Norm Robertson	1	7–3–0	.700
1955–1959	Ken Staples	4	38–19–0	.667
1959–1962	Don Saatzer	3	19–14–0	.576
1962–1963	Tom Martinson	1	11–4–1	.719
1963–1970	Joe Flood	7	57–53–4	.518
1970–1982	Gus Schwartz	12	150–150–5	.500
1982–1987	Terry Abram	5	105–45–2	.697
1987–2010	Terry Skrypek	23	415–194–45	.669
2010–2021	Jeff Boeser	11	160–81–33	.644
2021–Present	Enrico Blasi	4	48–89–9	.360
Totals	26 coaches	101 Seasons	1,217–755–128	.610

== Current roster ==
As of September 11, 2025.

No.	Nat.	Player	Class	Pos	Height	Weight	DoB	Hometown	Previous team	NHL rights
1	(United States)	Will Ingemann	Freshman	G	5' 11" (1.8 m)	179 lb (81 kg)	2005-04-22	Plymouth, Minnesota	Penticton Vees (BCHL)	—
2	(United States)	Colton Jamieson	Freshman	D	6' 0" (1.83 m)	198 lb (90 kg)	2004-11-28	Hudson, Wisconsin	Madison Capitols (USHL)	—
3	(United States)	Lucas Wahlin	Senior	F	5' 11" (1.8 m)	160 lb (73 kg)	2001-05-03	Woodbury, Minnesota	Lincoln Stars (NAHL)	WIN, undrafted overall 2026
4	(United States)	Cole Miller	Junior	D	5' 11" (1.8 m)	185 lb (84 kg)	2002-08-27	Littleton, Colorado	Sioux Falls Stampede (USHL)	—
5	(United States)	Hayes Hundley	Freshman	D	6' 3" (1.91 m)	207 lb (94 kg)	2005-03-22	Upper Arlington, Ohio	Fargo Force (USHL)	—
7	(United States)	Sam Ranallo	Freshman	F	5' 10" (1.78 m)	168 lb (76 kg)	2004-11-17	Rogers, Minnesota	Cranbrook Bucks (BCHL)	—
8	(Canada)	Caige Sterzer	Senior	F	6' 5" (1.96 m)	225 lb (102 kg)	2000-08-20	Kimberley, British Columbia	Lindenwood (NCAA)	—
9	(United States)	Casy Laylin	Sophomore	F	5' 9" (1.75 m)	170 lb (77 kg)	2004-01-09	St. Michael, Minnesota	Salmon Arm Silverbacks (BCHL)	—
10	(United States)	Mason Poolman	Junior	D	6' 1" (1.85 m)	189 lb (86 kg)	2002-01-31	East Grand Forks, Minnesota	Penticton Vees (BCHL)	—
11	(United States)	Ryan O'Neill	Senior	F	5' 10" (1.78 m)	175 lb (79 kg)	2001-02-25	Roseville, Minnesota	St. Cloud Norsemen (NAHL)	—
12	(United States)	Alex Gaffney	Graduate	F	5' 8" (1.73 m)	170 lb (77 kg)	2002-06-25	West Orange, New Jersey	Harvard (ECAC)	—
13	(United States)	Lucas Van Vliet	Freshman	F	6' 2" (1.88 m)	181 lb (82 kg)	2006-01-25	Livonia, Michigan	Dubuque Fighting Saints (USHL)	VGK, 197th overall 2024
14	(United States)	Jase Sofo	Junior	D	6' 4" (1.93 m)	190 lb (86 kg)	2002-06-25	Sylvania, Ohio	Amarillo Wranglers (NAHL)	—
15	(Canada)	Quinton Pepper	Senior	F	6' 3" (1.91 m)	187 lb (85 kg)	2002-01-31	London, Ontario	Steinbach Pistons (MJHL)	—
16	(United States)	Bauer Berry	Freshman	D	6' 4" (1.93 m)	218 lb (99 kg)	2005-10-31	Grand Forks, North Dakota	Muskegon Lumberjacks (USHL)	EDM, 218th overall 2024
17	(United States)	Jake Braccini	Senior	F	5' 11" (1.8 m)	192 lb (87 kg)	2001-07-02	Hanover, Minnesota	Muskegon Lumberjacks (USHL)	—
18	(United States)	Josh Giuliani	Freshman	F	6' 1" (1.85 m)	176 lb (80 kg)	2004-06-11	Plymouth, Minnesota	Dubuque Fighting Saints (USHL)	—
19	(United States)	Luc Laylin	Senior	F	5' 8" (1.73 m)	170 lb (77 kg)	2001-12-30	St. Michael, Minnesota	Prince George Spruce Kings (BCHL)	—
20	(United States)	Nick Williams	Junior	D	5' 10" (1.78 m)	177 lb (80 kg)	2002-09-21	Edina, Minnesota	Michigan Tech (CCHA)	—
21	(United States)	Carson Peters	Senior	D	6' 3" (1.91 m)	200 lb (91 kg)	2002-10-28	Medina, Minnesota	Cedar Rapids RoughRiders (USHL)	—
25	(United States)	Attila Lippai	Freshman	F	5' 9" (1.75 m)	181 lb (82 kg)	2004-11-25	Saint Paul, Minnesota	Tri-City Storm (USHL)	—
26	(United States)	Chase Cheslock	Junior	D	6' 3" (1.91 m)	205 lb (93 kg)	2004-10-25	Rogers, Minnesota	Omaha Lancers (USHL)	NJD, 154th overall 2023
27	(United States)	Luke Schelter	Freshman	F	6' 2" (1.88 m)	196 lb (89 kg)	2004-04-06	Centennial, Colorado	Fargo Force (USHL)	—
28	(United States)	Dylan Godbout	Sophomore	F	5' 11" (1.8 m)	185 lb (84 kg)	2004-05-05	Woodbury, Minnesota	Ohio State (Big Ten)	—
29	(Canada)	Nathan Pilling	Freshman	F	6' 4" (1.93 m)	209 lb (95 kg)	2004-06-22	Calgary, Alberta	Seattle Thunderbirds (WHL)	—
31	(Canada)	Aaron Trotter	Senior	G	6' 2" (1.88 m)	170 lb (77 kg)	2001-04-07	Victoria, British Columbia	Prince George Spruce Kings (BCHL)	—
32	(United States)	Carsen Musser	Sophomore	G	6' 4" (1.93 m)	220 lb (100 kg)	2005-05-19	Fairmont, Minnesota	Colorado College (USHL)	UTA, 166th overall 2023
82	(United States)	Charlie Schoen	Junior	F	5' 10" (1.78 m)	160 lb (73 kg)	2001-06-02	Andover, Minnesota	Arizona State (NCHC)	—

== Awards and honors ==
=== CCHA ===
==== All-conference teams ====
First Team All-CCHA

- 2024–25: Liam Malmquist, F; Lucas Wahlin, F

Second Team All-CCHA

- 2023–24: Lucas Wahlin, F
- 2024–25: Chase Foley, D

== Arenas ==
From the program's first season in 1920, home games were played on makeshift outdoor rinks each winter at different spots on campus, including locations atop tennis courts near Ireland Hall and a patch of land behind Dowling Hall. The hockey team left campus in the early 1960s, playing in various off-campus arenas nearby until settling at the Minnesota State Fair Coliseum for nearly 30 years. Attempts were made to bring the team back on campus, including a fundraising effort in the 1980s. Eventually the team built a shared ice arena with Saint Thomas Academy in Mendota Heights in 2003. With the move to Division I in 2020, St Thomas announced in 2023 that it would build the Lee & Penny Anderson Arena, marking the return of the program to campus for the first time in over 60 years.

- Various outdoor rinks on-campus, St. Paul, MN (1920–1962)
- Cow Palace (now known as Doug Woog Arena), South St. Paul, MN (1962–1963)
- Aldrich Arena, Maplewood, MN (1963–1970)
- St. Paul Academy, St. Paul, MN (1970–1976)
- State Fair Coliseum, Falcon Heights, MN (1976–2003)
- St. Thomas Ice Arena, Mendota Heights, MN (2003–2025)
- Lee & Penny Anderson Arena, St. Paul, MN (2025–present)

== Tommies in the NHL ==
As of July 1, 2025.

Player	Position	Team(s)	Years	Games	Stanley Cups
Elwin Romnes	Center	CHI , TOR, NYA	1927–1940	360	2
