= Formula E sponsorship liveries =

Since its inception in 2014, teams participating in Formula E have run liveries that reflect their sponsors, with some special, one-off liveries being used in some races.

== Abt ==
Season	Main colour(s)	Additional colour(s)	Main sponsor(s)	Additional major sponsor(s)
2014–15	Red, Yellow	Black, Green		Deutsche Post, DHL, GEO, H&R, PS4, Schaeffler, Sonax, Telefunken, TitanFix, VfL Wolfsburg, Warsteiner, Würth Elektronik
2015–16	Red, Yellow	Black, Green	Schaeffler	Deutsche Post, DHL, H&R, LGT, PS4, Qualcomm, Sonax, TitanFix, VfL Wolfsburg, Volkswagen, Würth Elektronik
2016–17	Red, Yellow	Black, Green	Audi, Schaeffler	Deutsche Post, DHL, H&R, HTLA, ITK, KNM, KUKA, LGT, PS4, Sonax, Warsteiner, Würth Elektronik
2017–18	Red, Green, White	Black, Yellow	Audi, Schaeffler	Audi e-tron, Deutsche Post, DHL, HTLA, KUKA, LGT, Riello Ups, Würth Elektronik
2018–19	Red, Green, White	Black, Yellow	Audi, Schaeffler	Audi e-tron, Deutsche Post, DHL, HTLA, KUKA, LGT, Riello Ups, Würth Elektronik
2019–20	Red, Green, White	Black	Audi, Schaeffler	Audi e-tron, HTLA, KUKA, LGT, Riello Ups, Sonax, Würth Elektronik
2020–21	Red, Green, White	Black	Audi, Schaeffler	Audi e-tron, Casa Moda, Castrol, HTLA, KUKA, LGT, Riello Ups, Sonax, Würth Elektronik
2022–23	Turquiose	Yellow	Cupra	Südpack, ZF
2023–24	Turquiose	Yellow	Cupra	Südpack, ZF

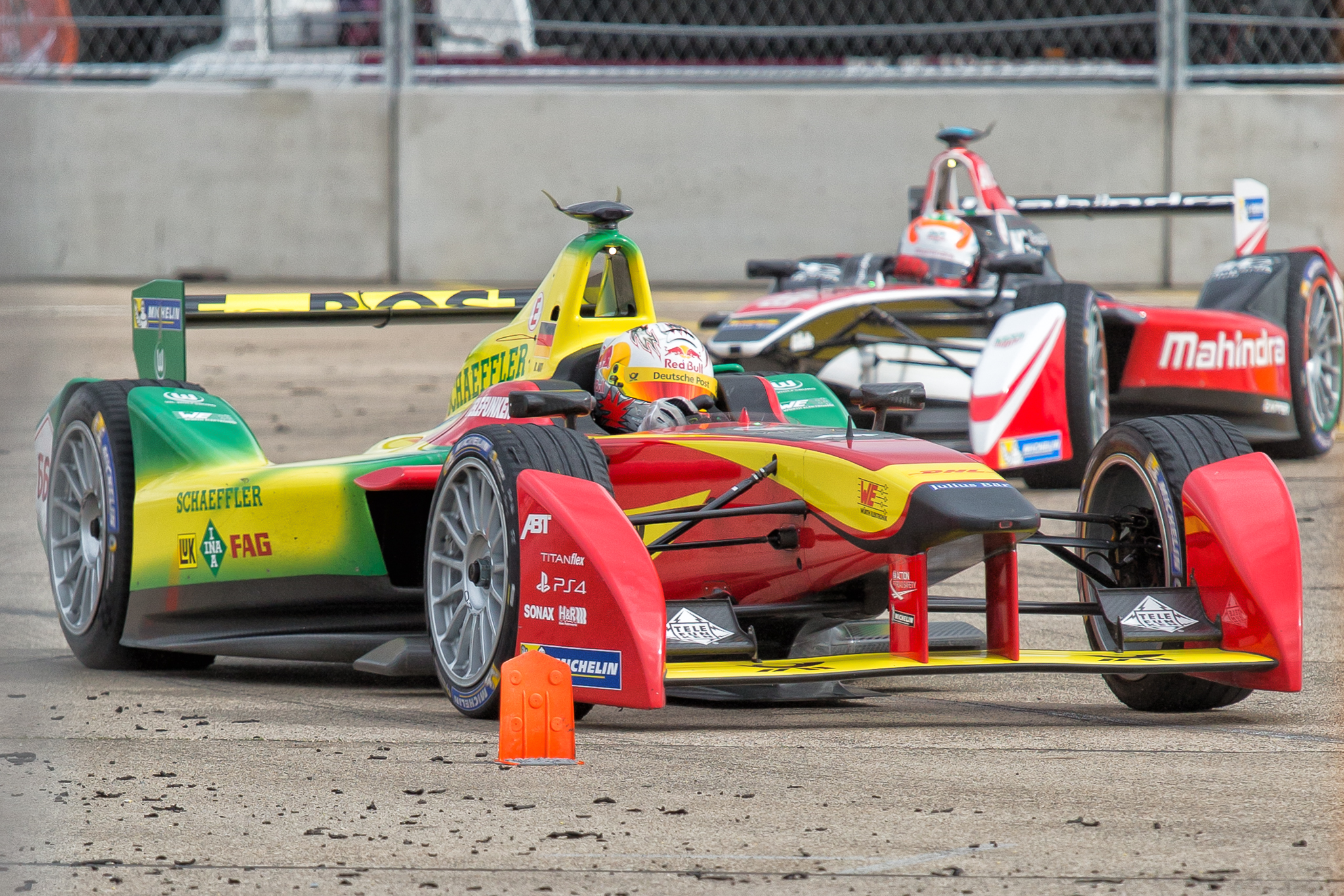
Daniel Abt driving the Spark-Renault SRT 01E at 2015 Berlin ePrix

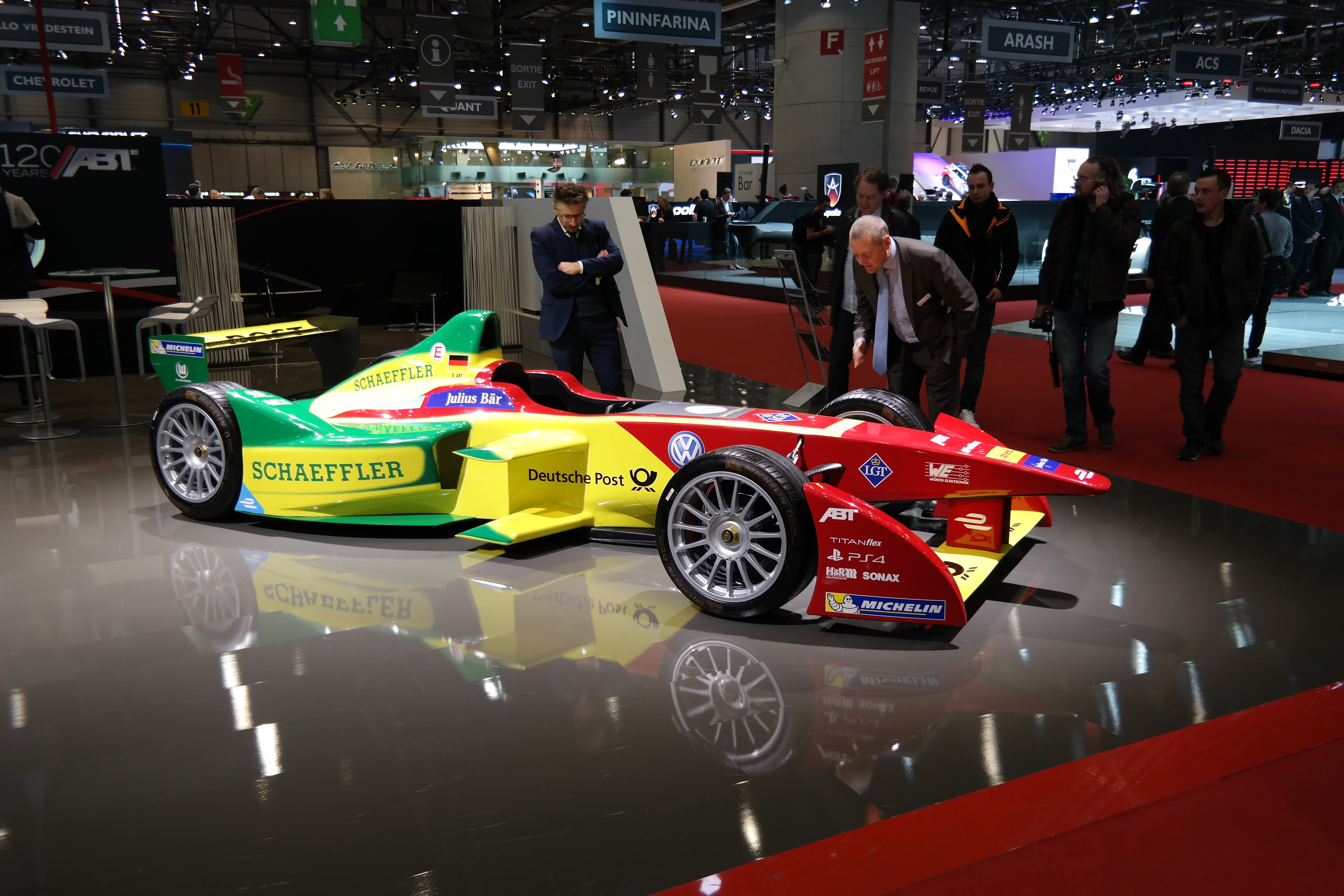
Abt car at 2016 Geneva International Motor Show

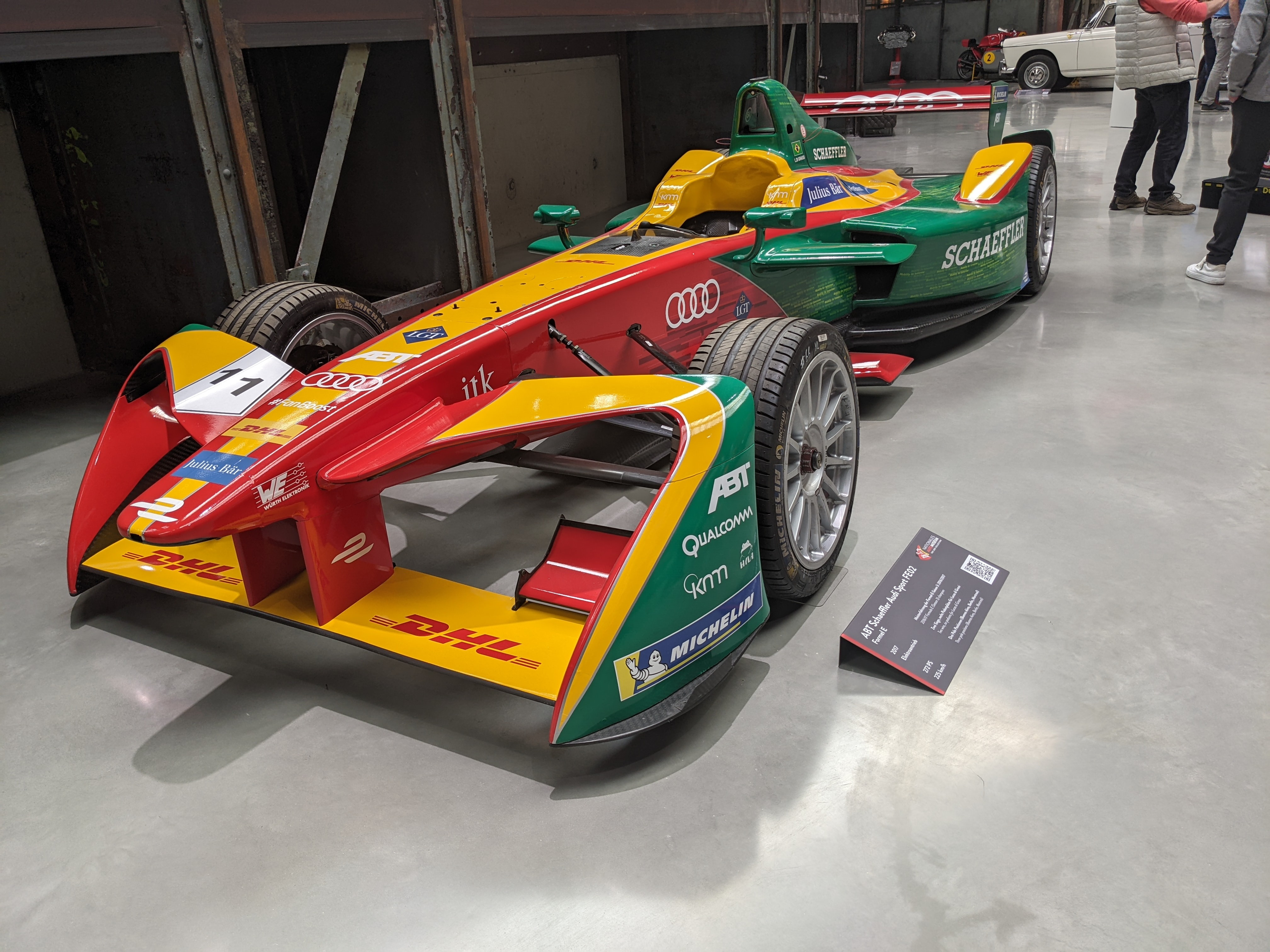
Abt car at Nationales Automuseum

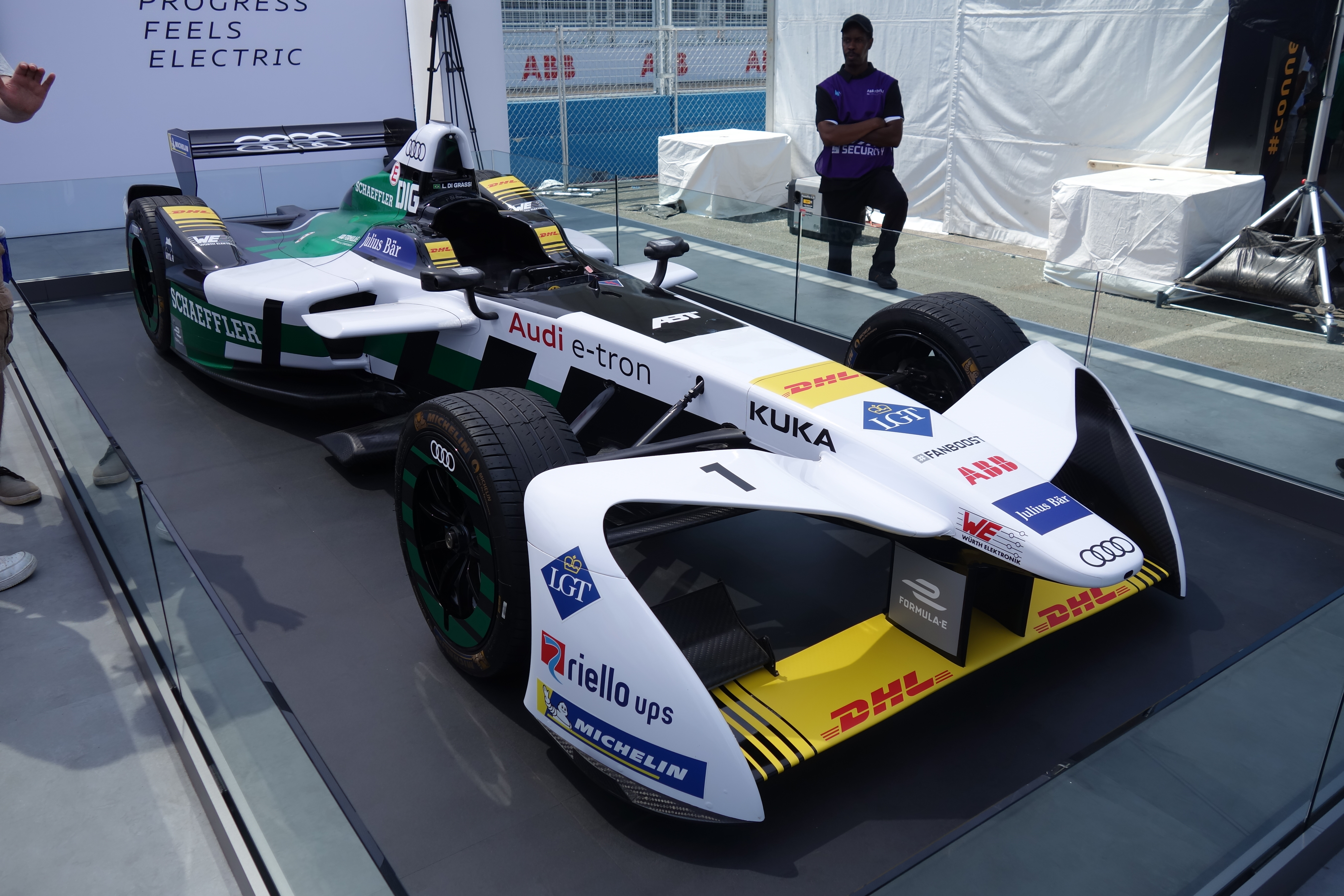
Abt car at 2018 New York City ePrix

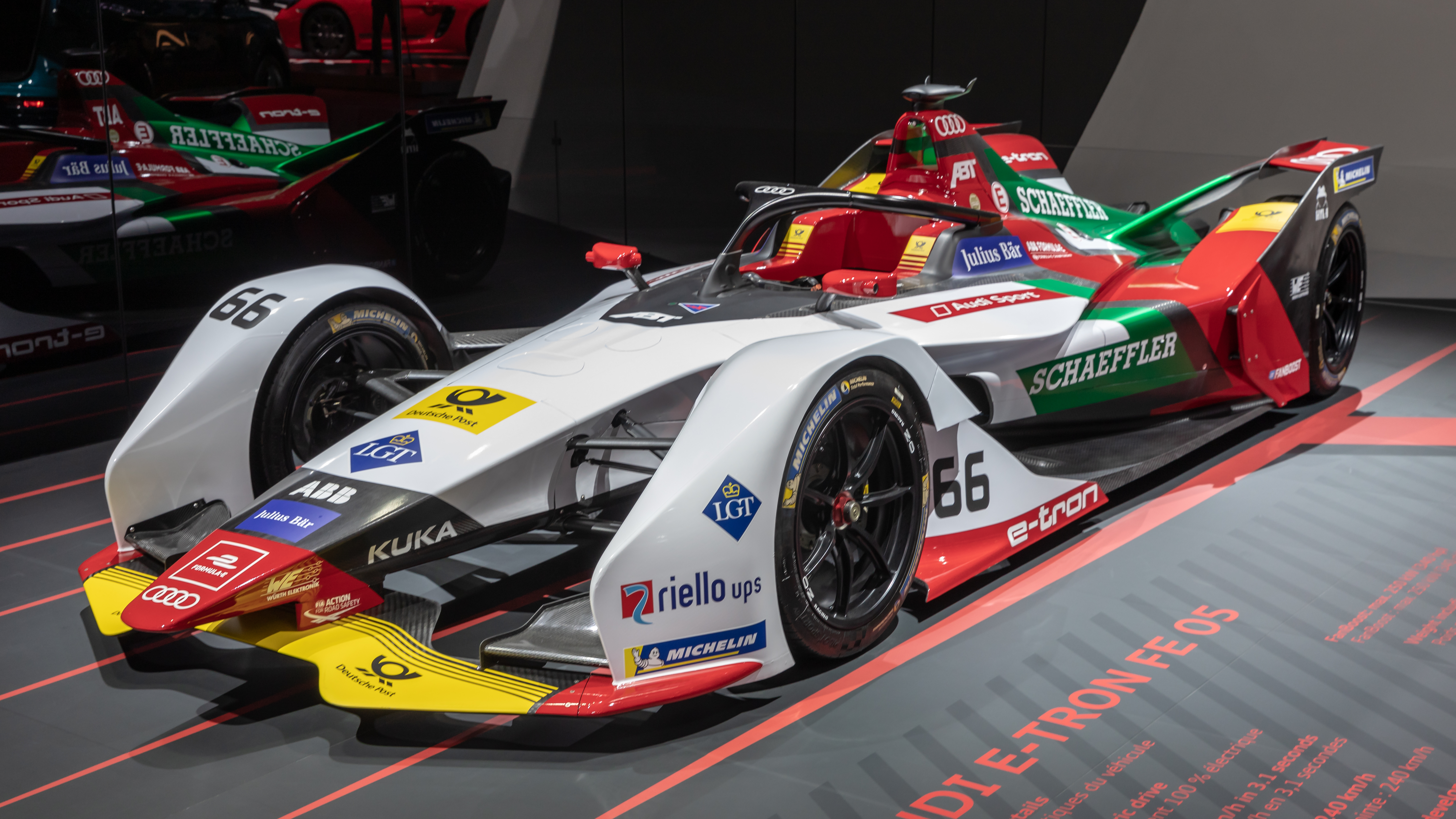
Abt car at 2019 Geneva International Motor Show

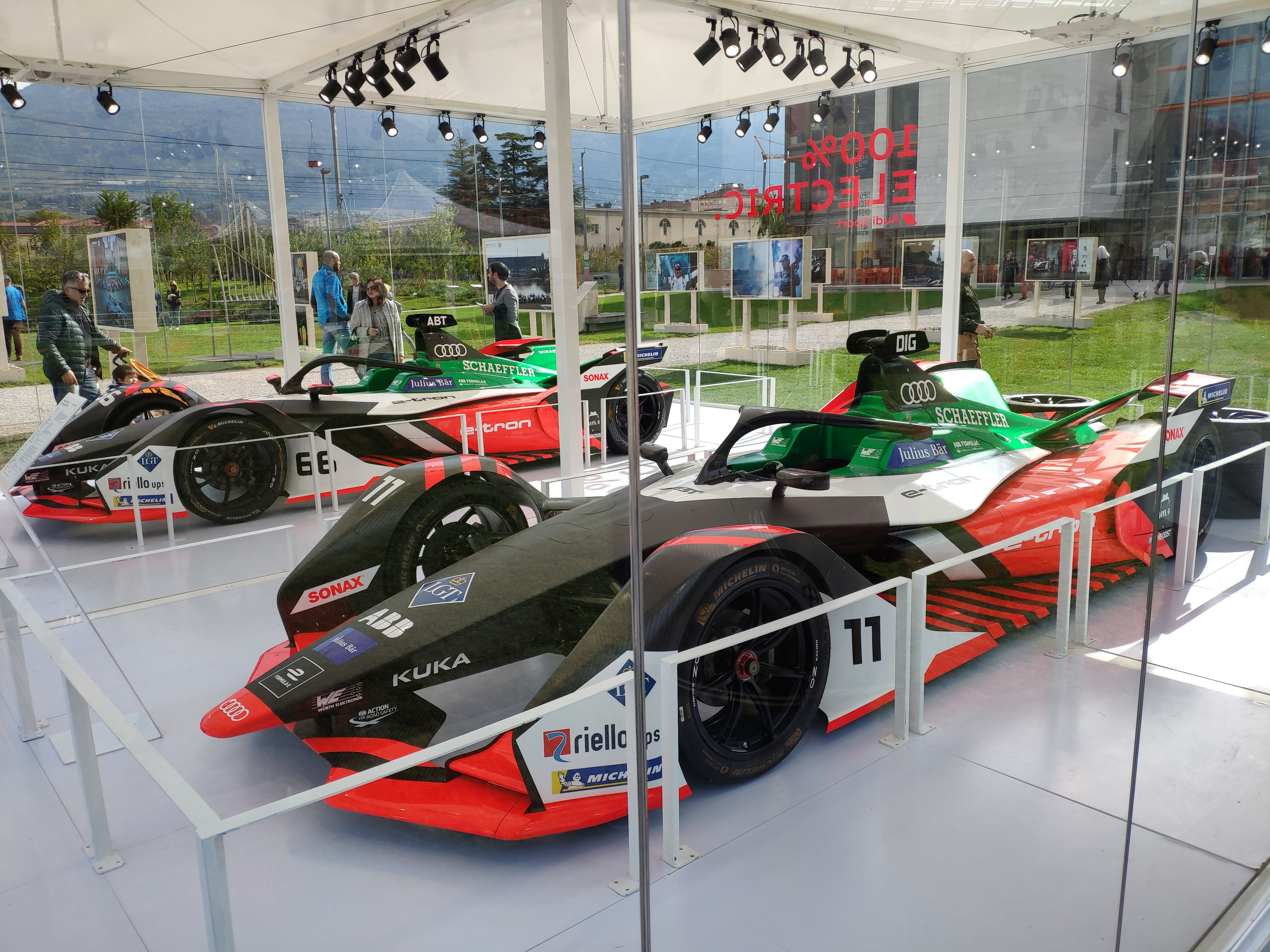
Abt cars at 2019 Festival dello Sport

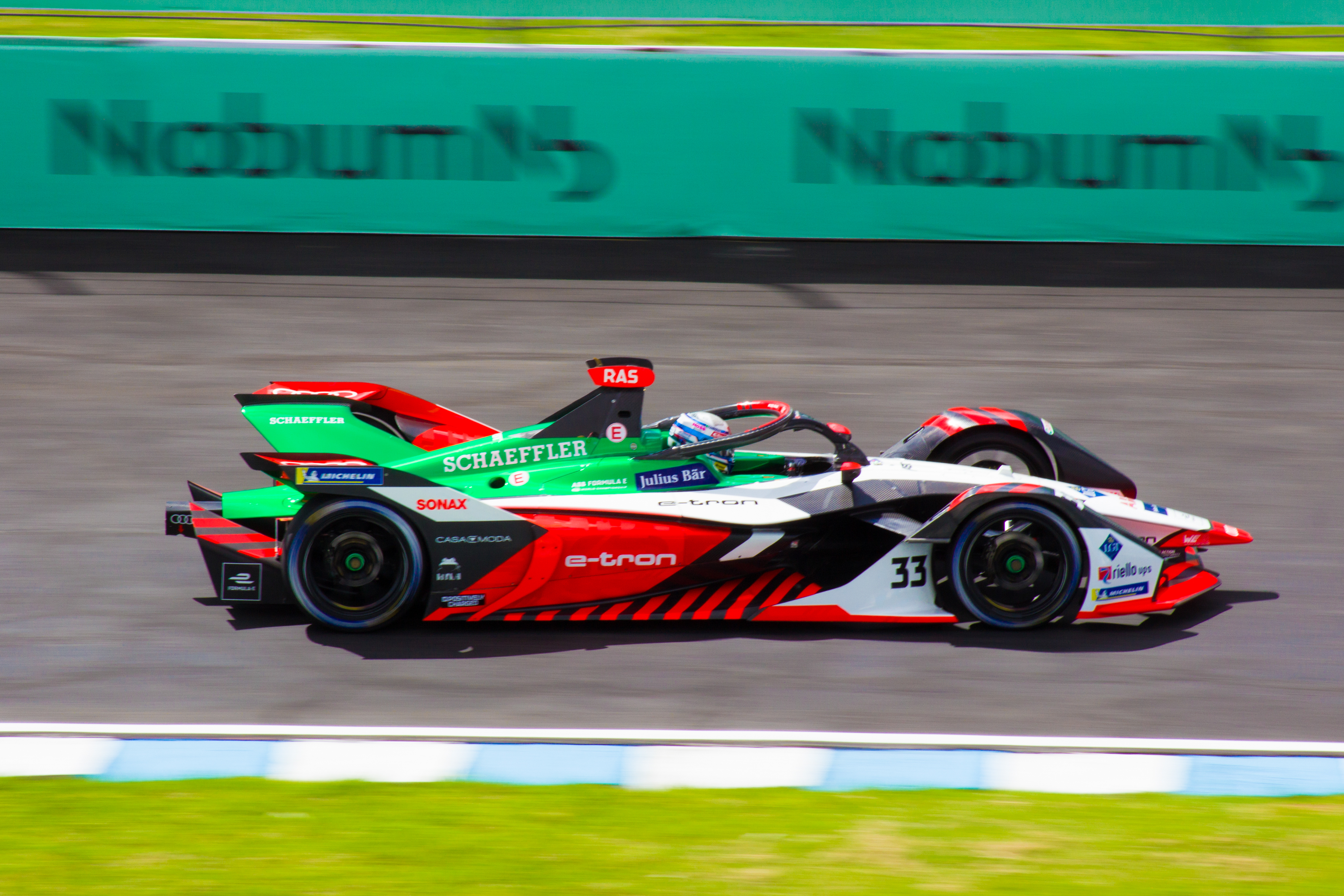
René Rast driving the Spark SRT05e at 2021 Puebla ePrix

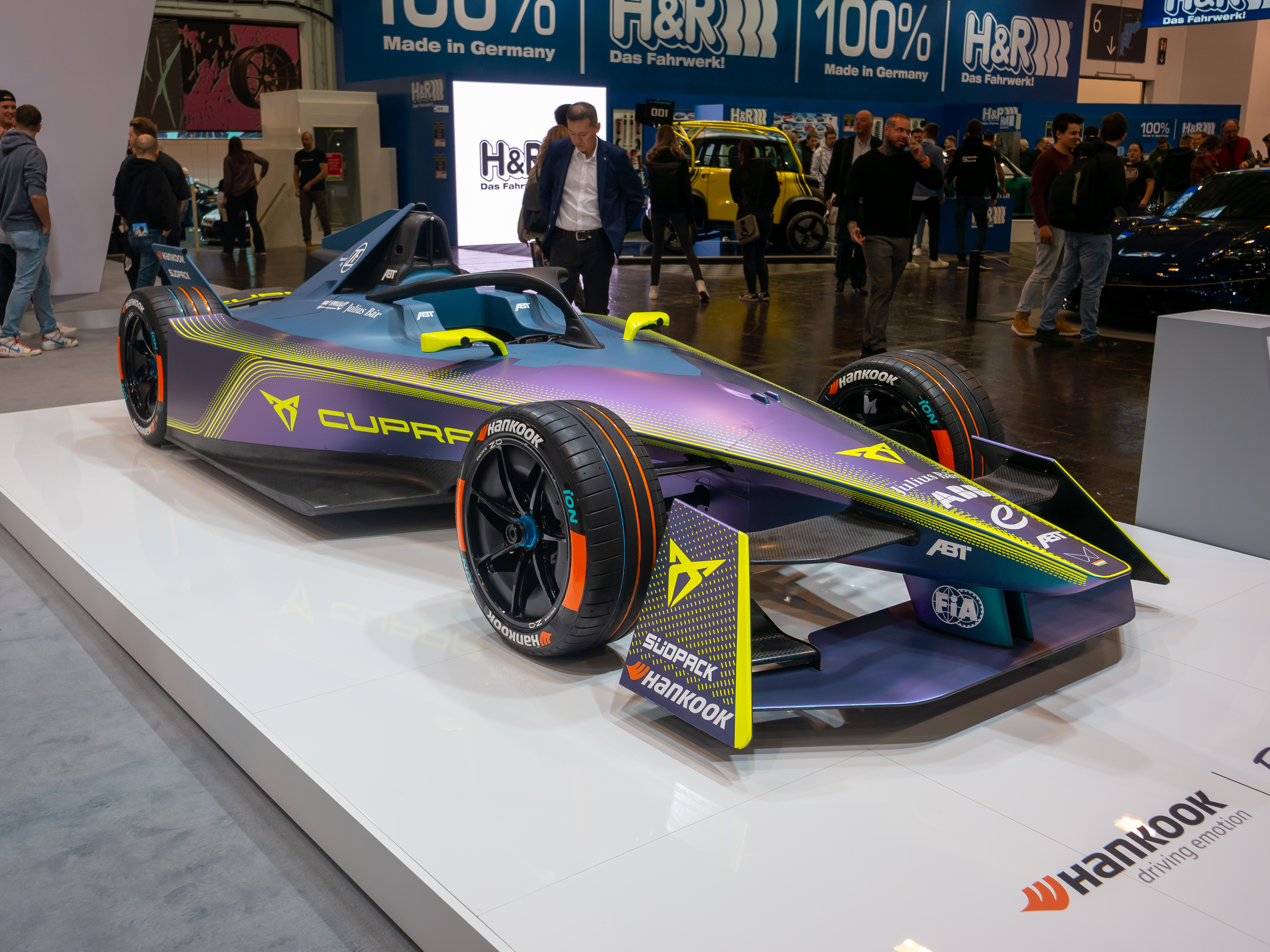
Abt car at 2023 Essen Motor Show

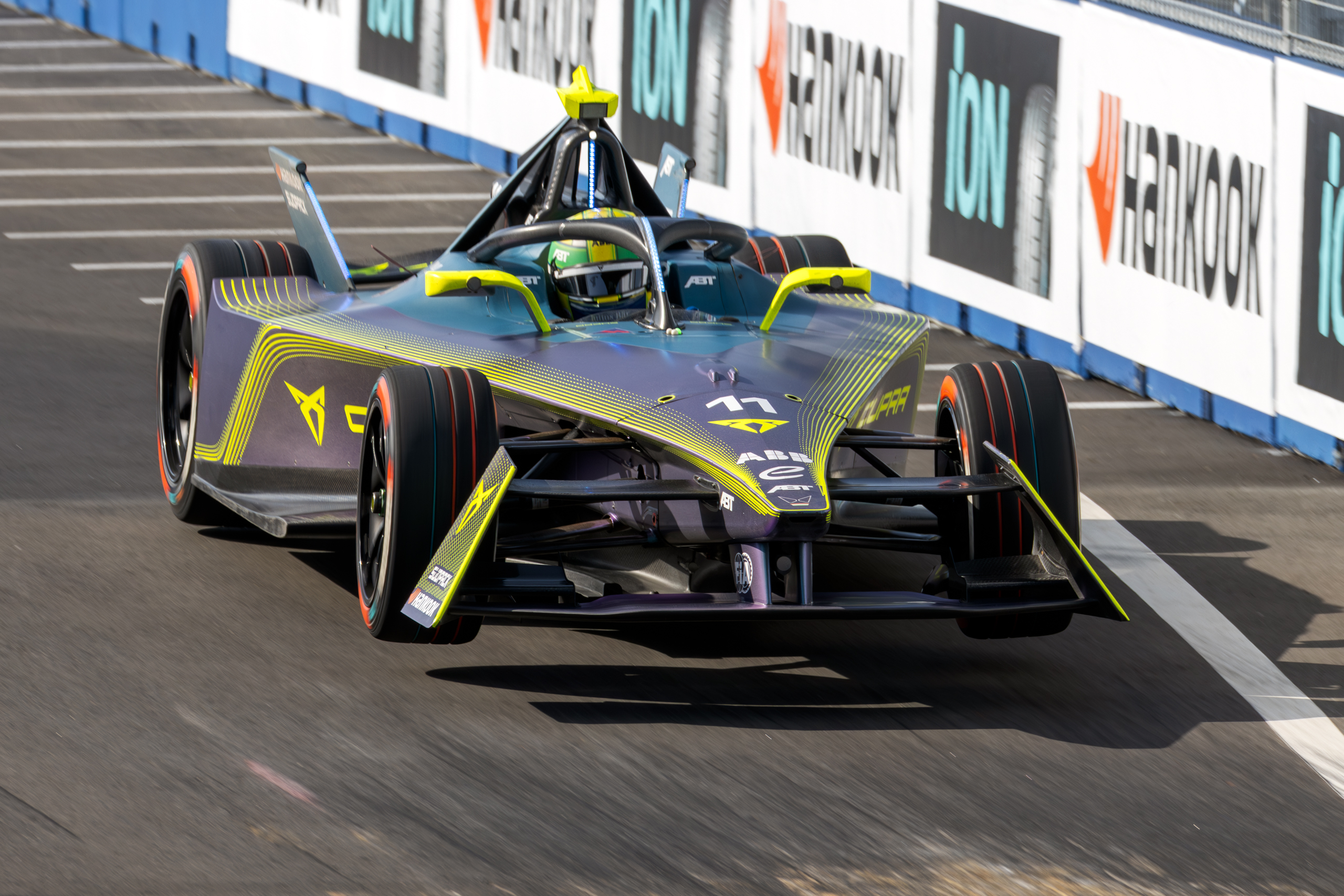
Lucas di Grassi driving the Formula E Gen3 at 2024 Tokyo ePrix

== Aguri ==
Season	Main colour(s)	Additional colour(s)	Main sponsor(s)	Additional major sponsor(s)
2014–15	Blue	Red, White	Amlin	Lodgeo, TCC.com, VanDutch, XCOR
2015–16	White	Blue, Orange	Gulf Oil	Argo Group, Airlite, Innovator Capital, Io Corp, OMP, RS Simulation, Telcel

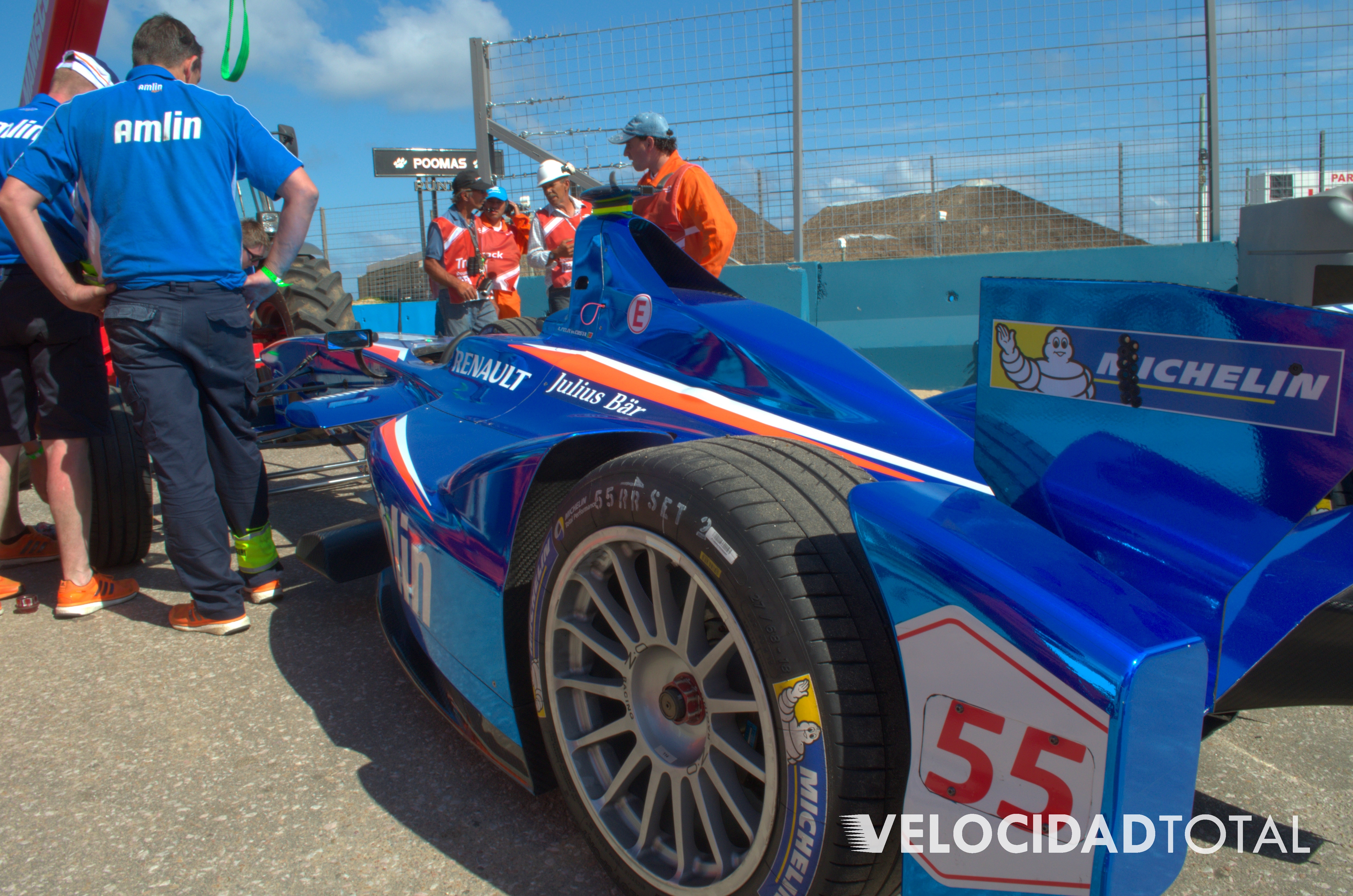
Aguri car at 2014 Punta del Este ePrix

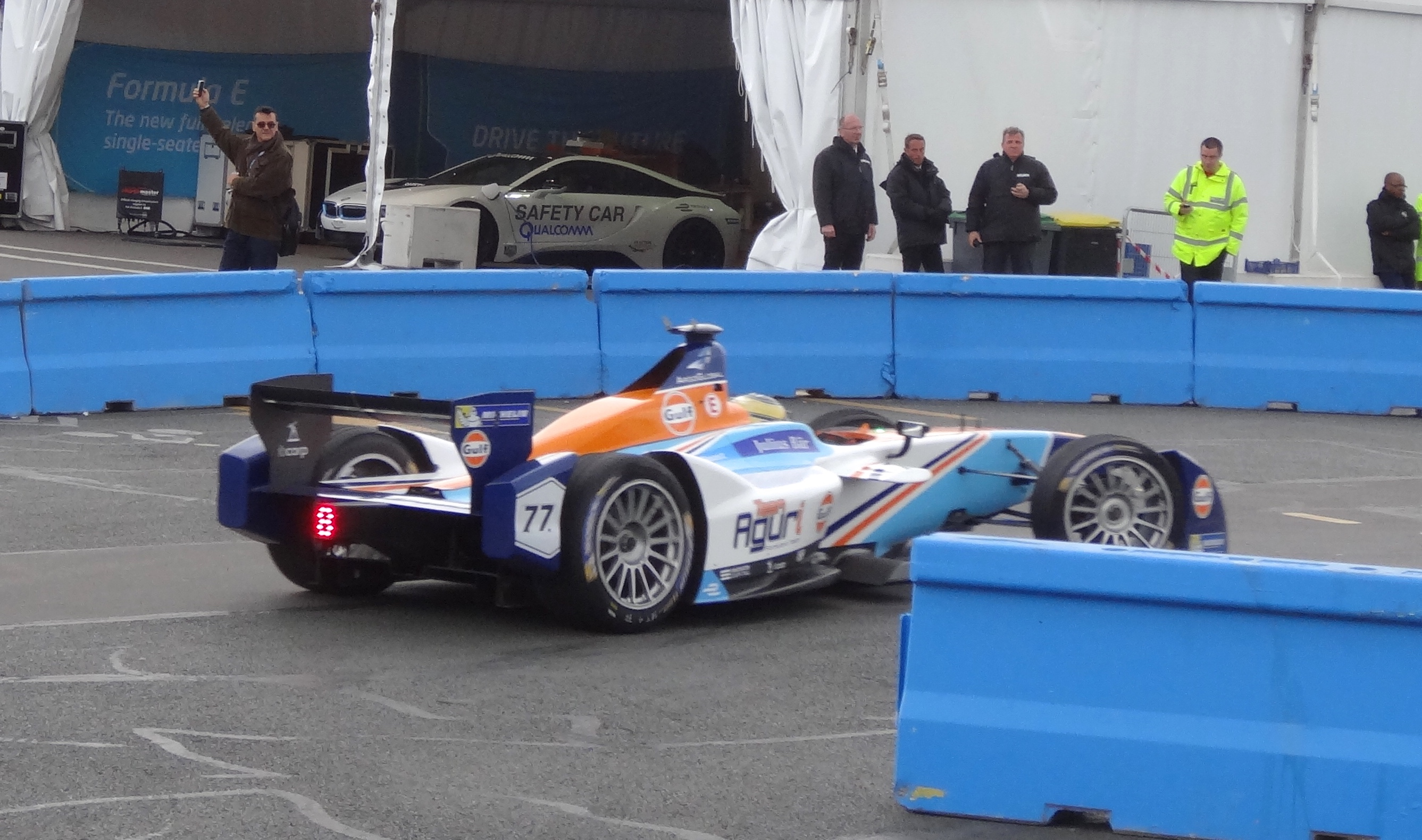
Ma Qing Hua driving the Spark-Renault SRT 01E at 2016 Paris ePrix

== Andretti ==
Season	Main colour(s)	Additional colour(s)	Main sponsor(s)	Additional major sponsor(s)	Special liveries
2014–15	Blue, White	Black, Red		Cinsay, Houston Mechatronics, Merchant First	At 2015 London ePrix Andretti used an orange livery due to their partnership with TE Connectivity.
2015–16	Blue	Orange	Amlin	TE Connectivity, Houston Mechatronics	
2016–17	Blue	White, Red	MS Amlin	TE Connectivity, BMW i, Harman Kardon, Julius Baer	
2017–18	Cyan	Blue, Pink	MS&AD	MSIG, MS Amlin, TE Connectivity, BMW i, Harman Kardon, Julius Baer	
2018–19	Blue	Black, White	BMW i, Magna	Einhell, Harman Kardon, Julius Baer, Puma	
2019–20	Black, White	Blue, Violet	BMW i, Magna	Einhell, Fortinet, Harman Kardon, Julius Baer, Puma	
2020–21	Black, White	Blue, Violet	BMW i, Magna	Einhell, Fortinet, Julius Baer, Puma	
2021–22	Red	White	Avalanche	Crowe, Genesys, Indiana	
2022–23	Red	White	Avalanche	Crowe, Indiana, NAGASE, Prysmian	
2023–24	Red, White	Blue	Guggenheim	Crowe, Indiana, NAGASE, Prysmian	
2024–25	Red, White	Blue	Guggenheim	Crowe, NAGASE, Prysmian	
2025–26	Red (2025), Yellow (2026)	Black	TWG Motorsports (2025), TWG AI (2026)	Crowe, Quest Global	
2026–27	Silver	Black		Crowe	

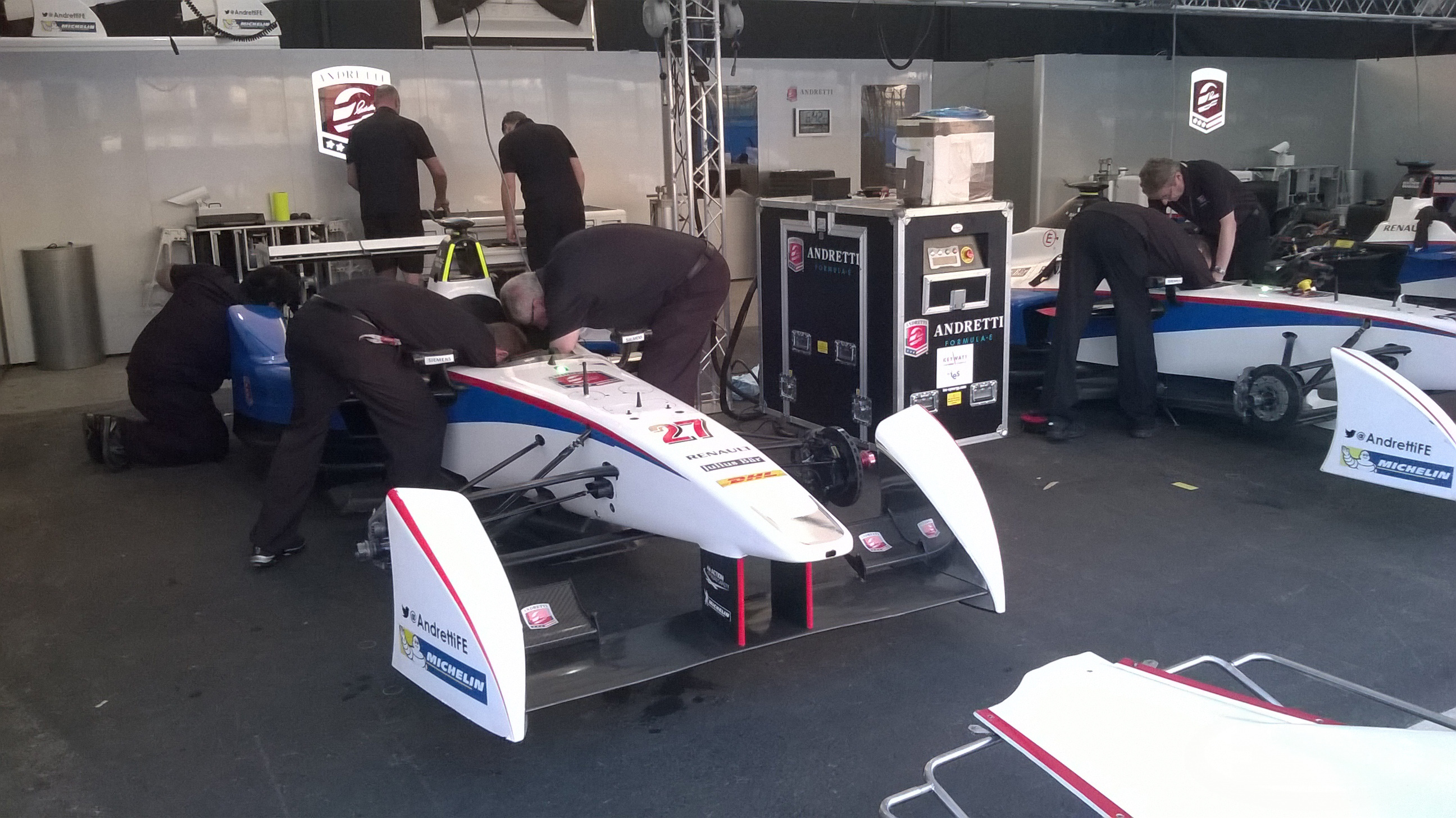
Andretti car at 2014 Punta del Este ePrix

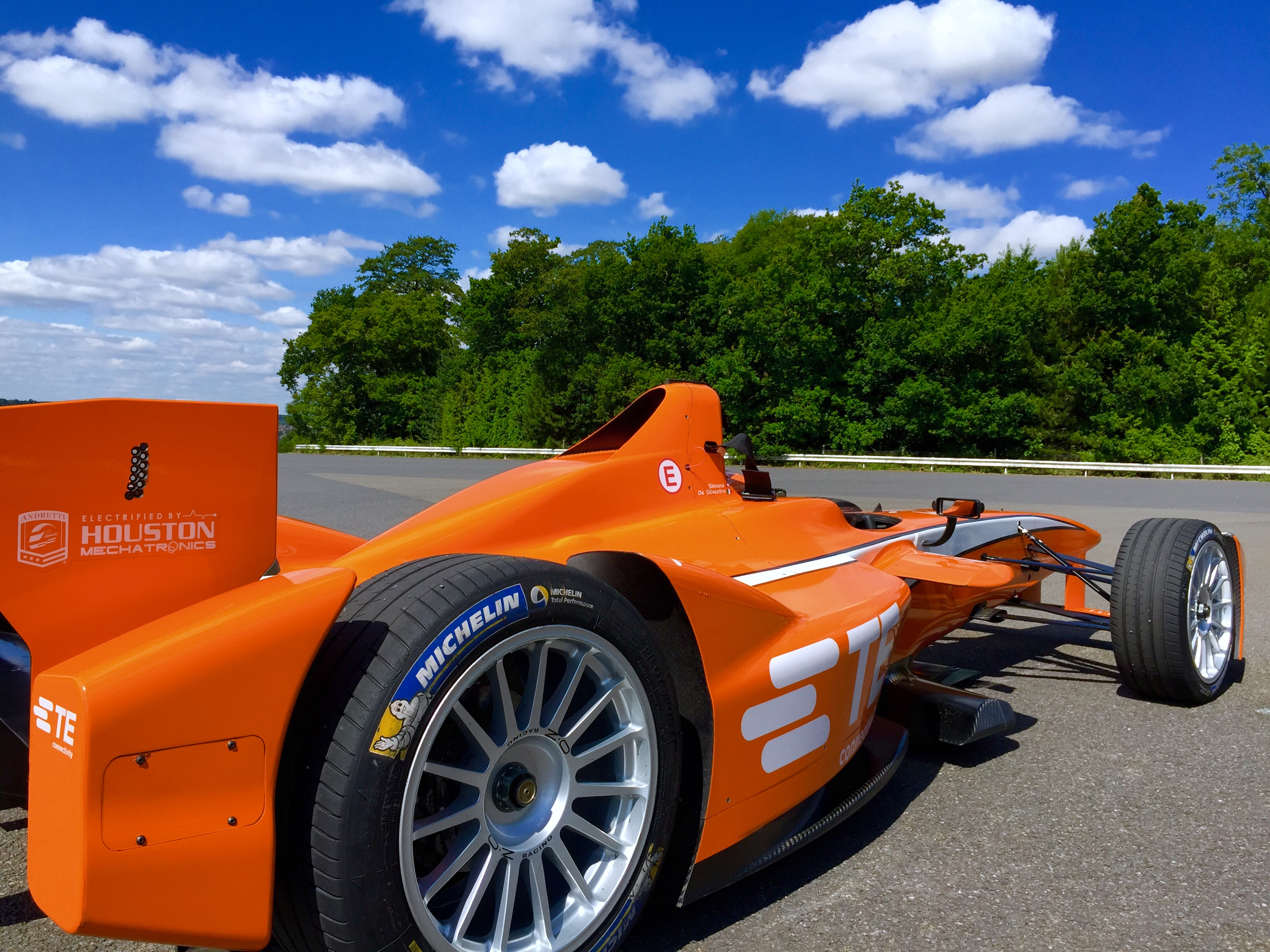
Andretti car at 2015 London ePrix

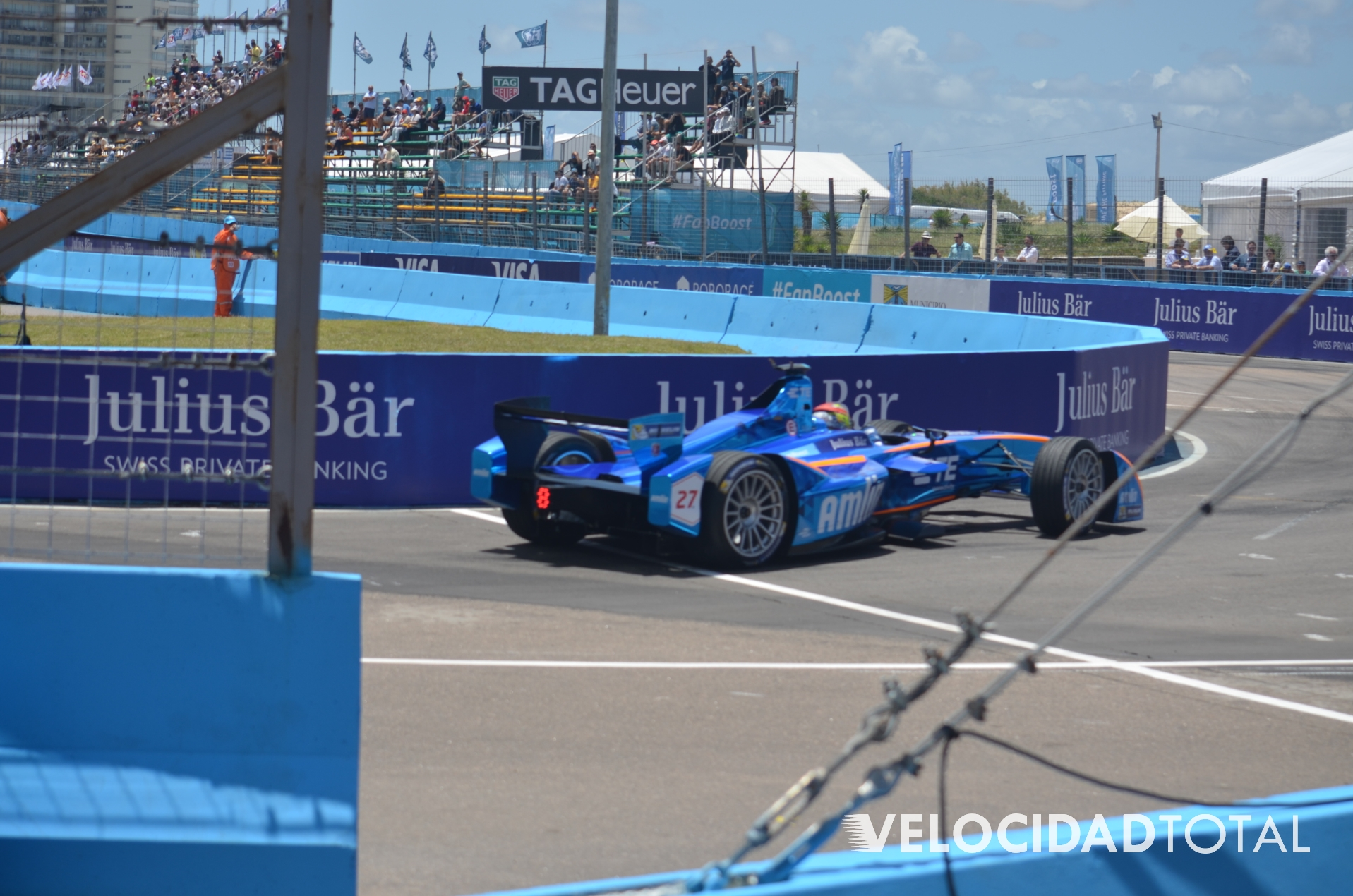
Robin Frijns driving the Spark-Renault SRT 01E at 2015 Punta del Este ePrix

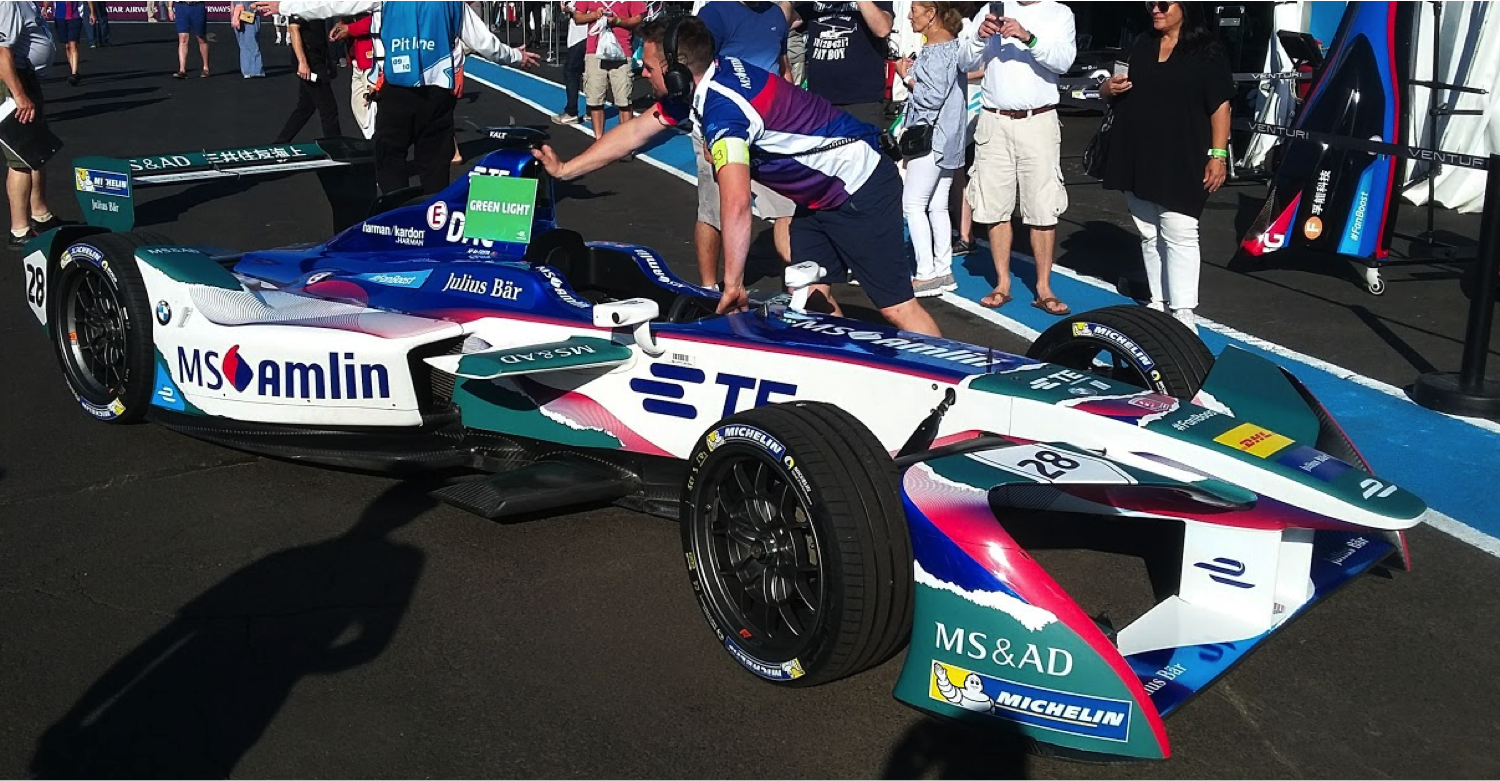
Andretti car at 2017 New York City ePrix

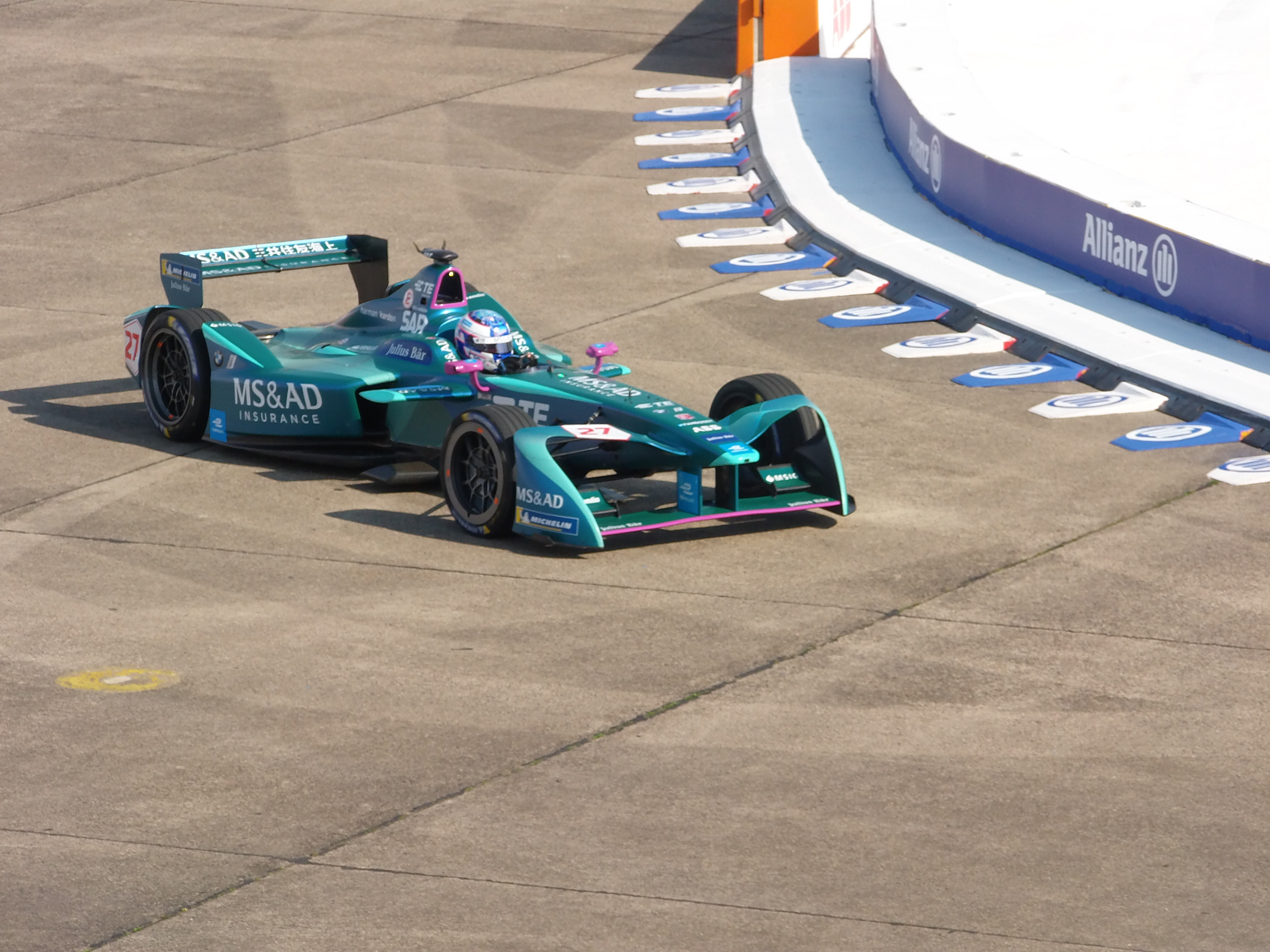
Stéphane Sarrazin driving the Spark-Renault SRT 01E at 2018 Berlin ePrix

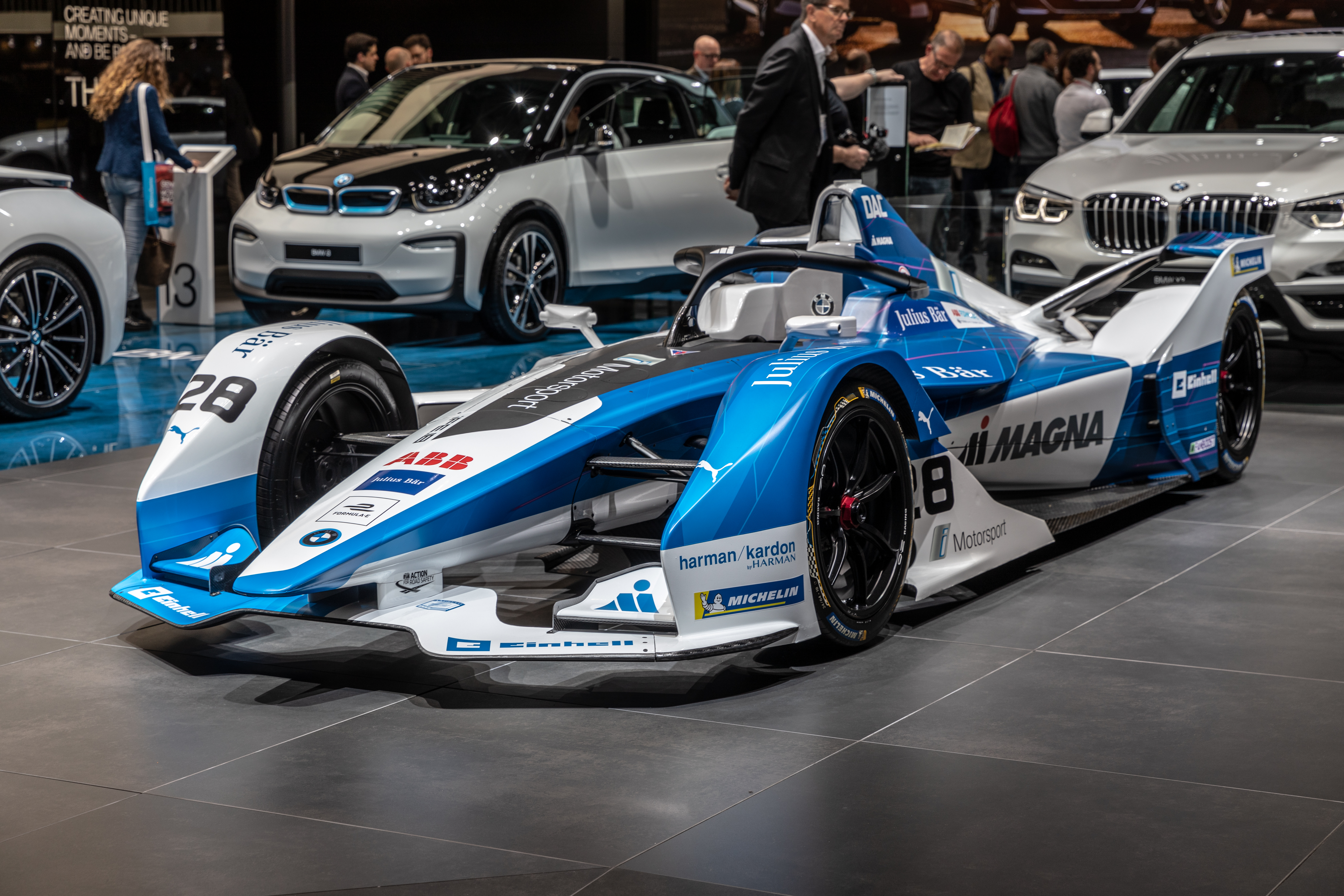
Andretti car at 2019 Geneva International Motor Show

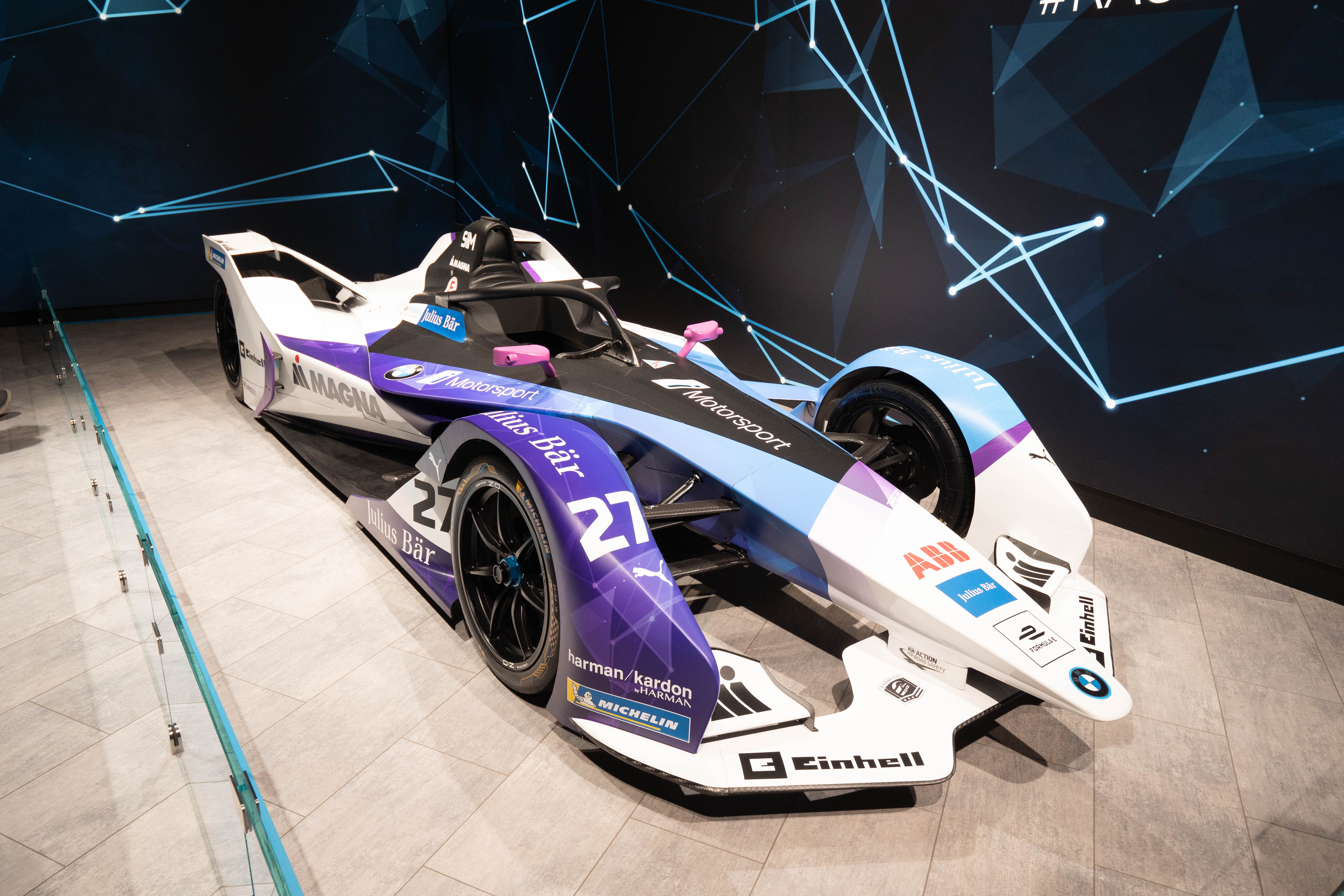
Andretti car at 2019 LA Auto Show

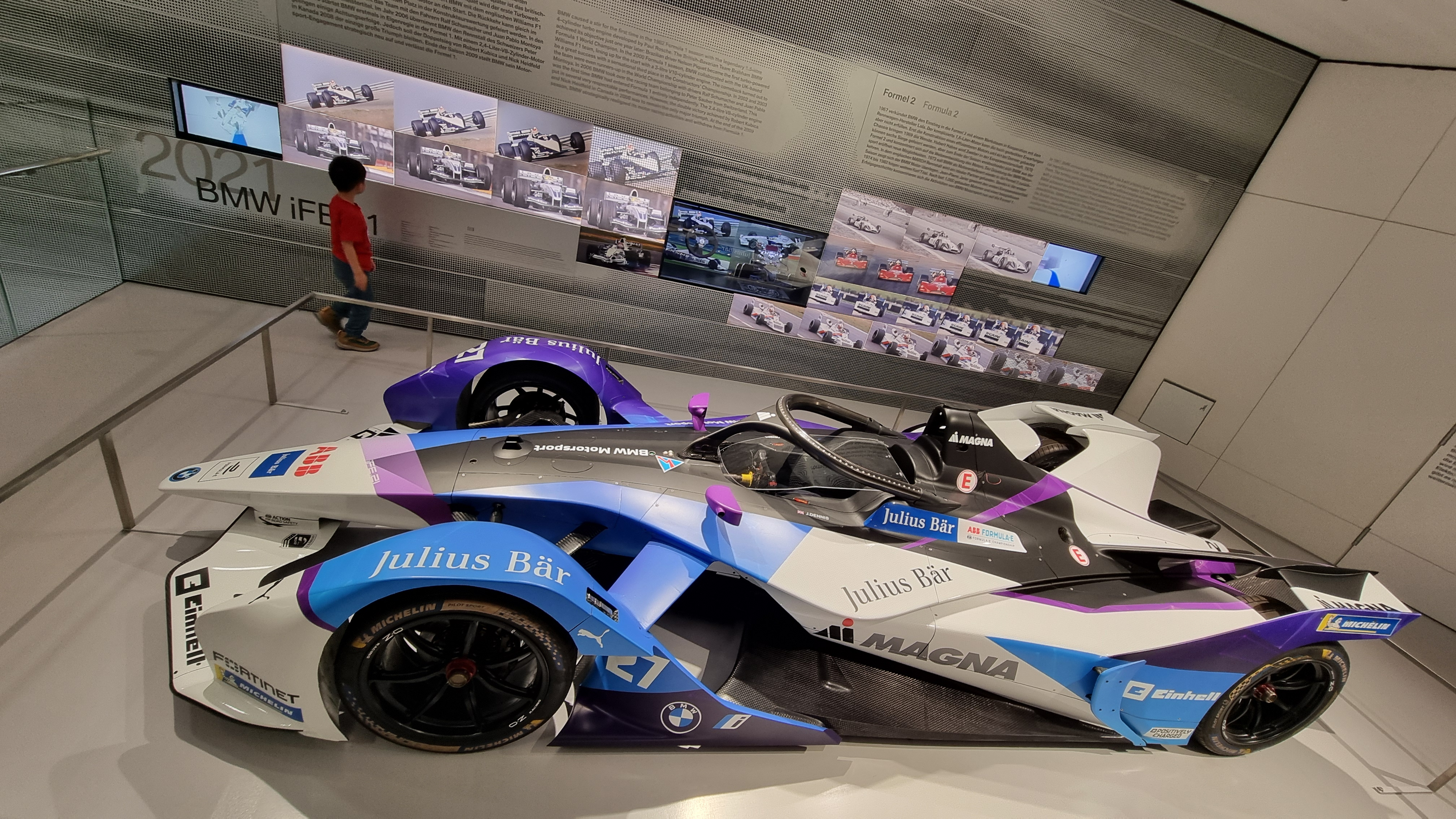
Andretti car at BMW Museum

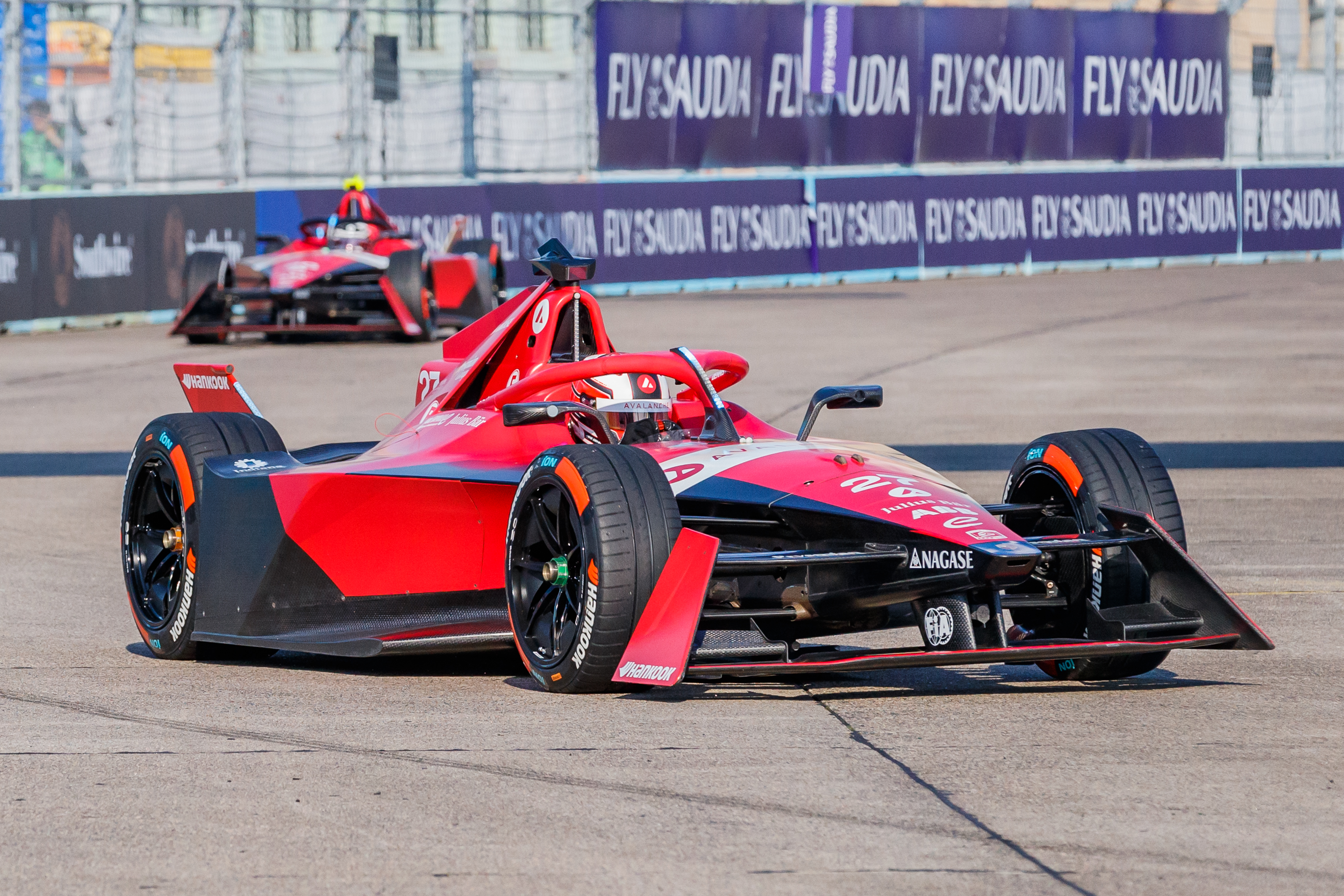
Jake Dennis driving the Formula E Gen3 at 2023 Berlin ePrix

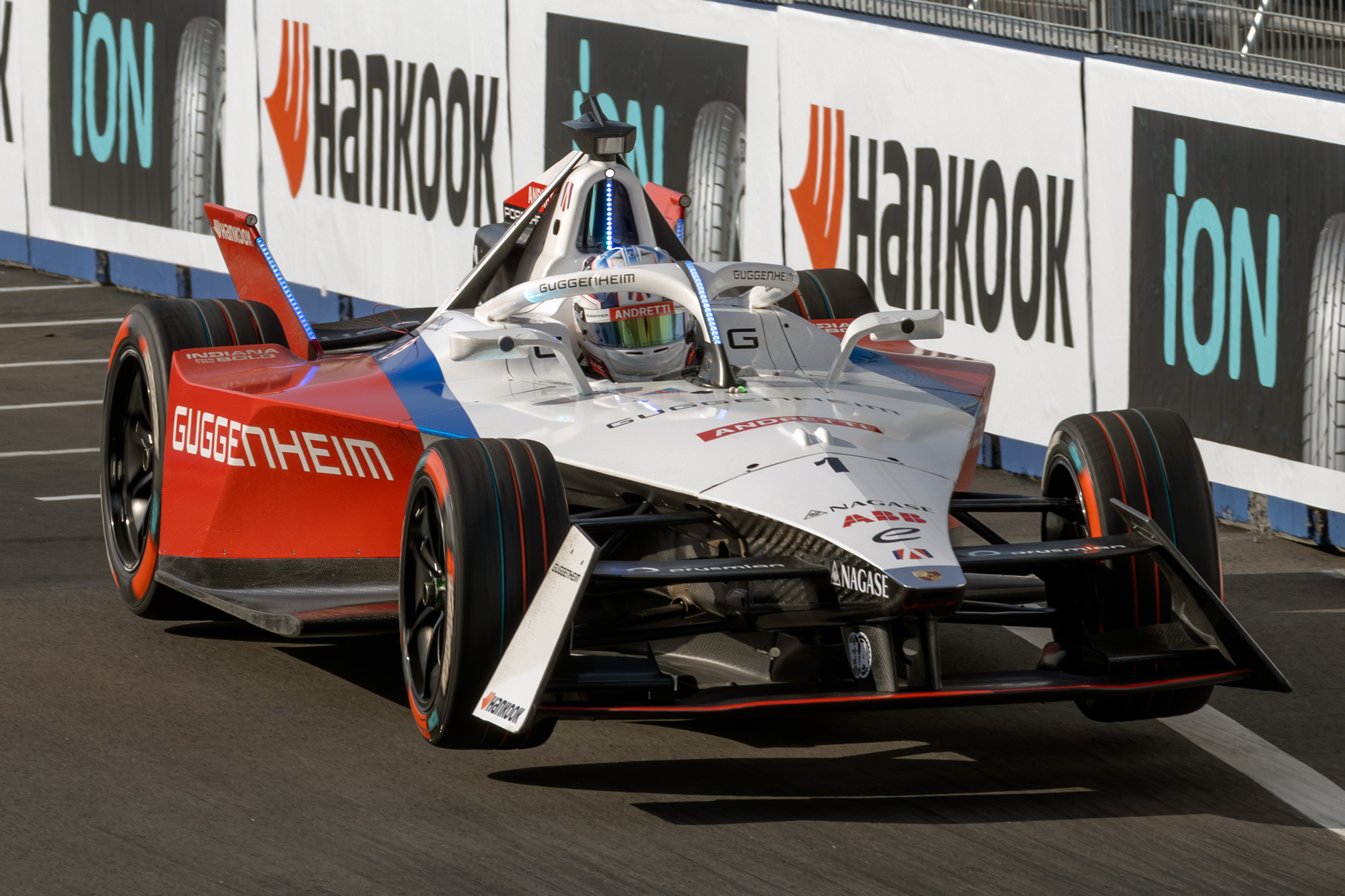
Jake Dennis driving the Formula E Gen3 at 2024 Tokyo ePrix

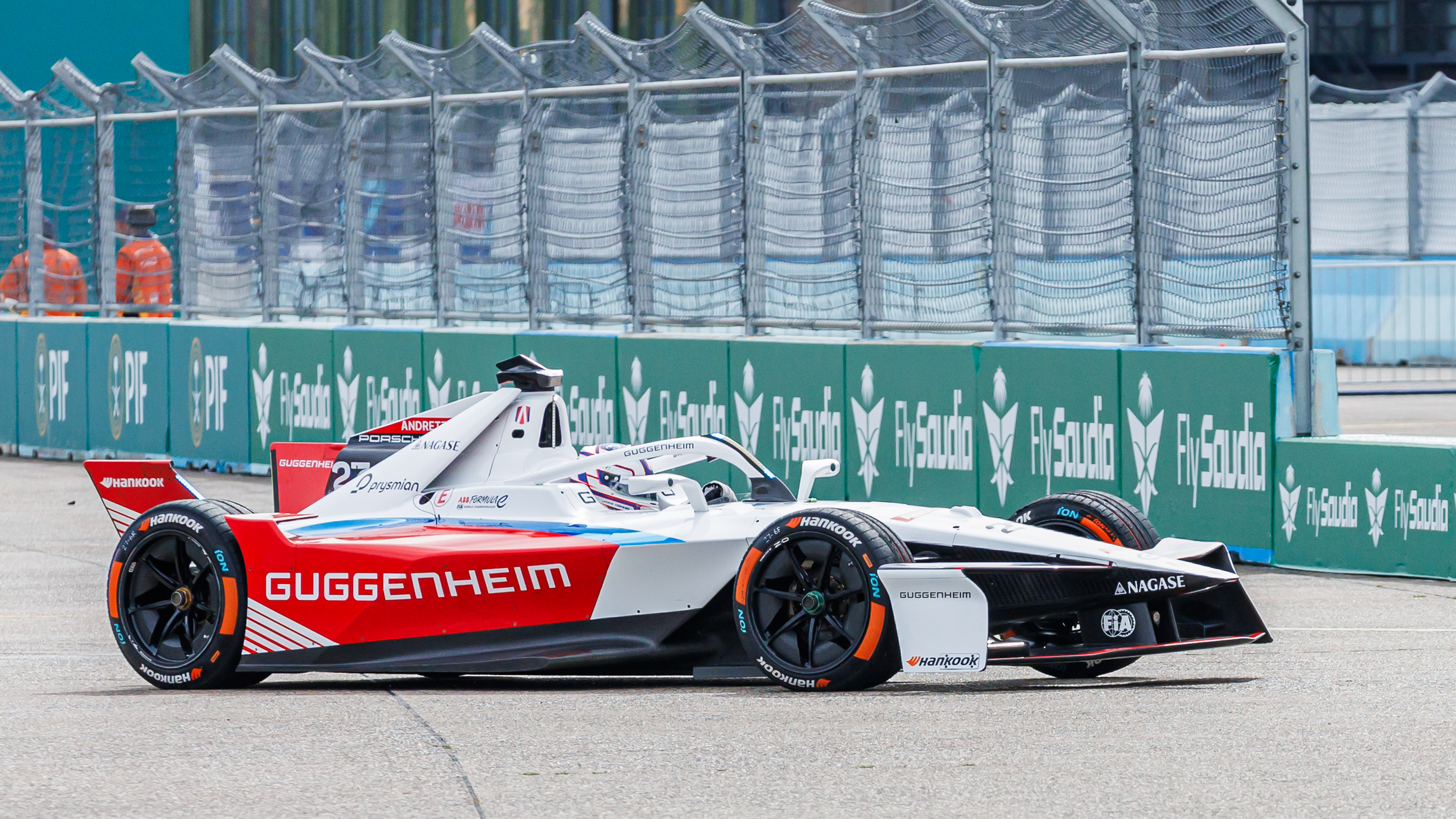
Jake Dennis driving the Formula E Gen3 EVO at 2025 Berlin ePrix

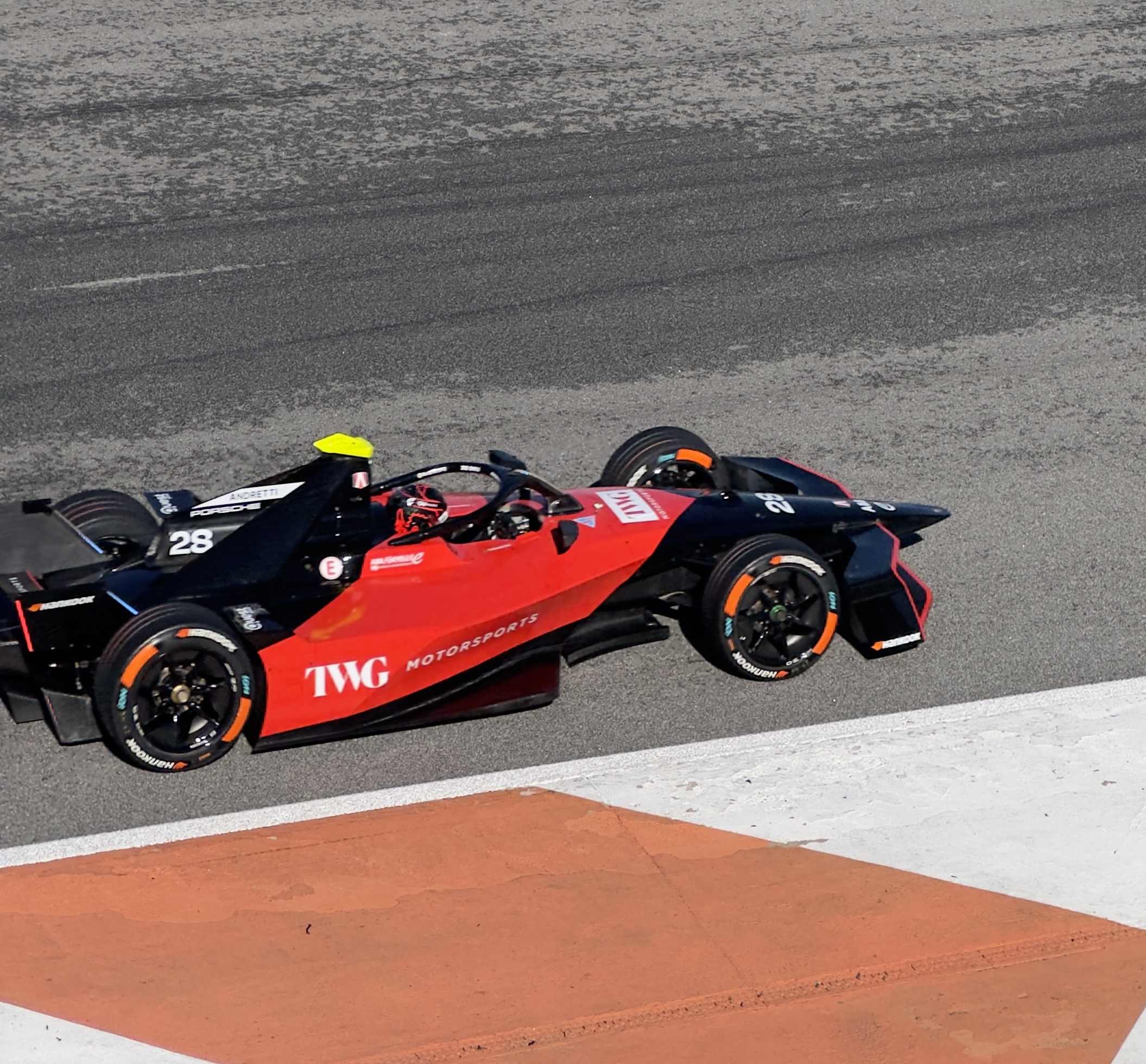
Felipe Drugovich driving the Formula E Gen3 EVO at 2025 the Pre-test season in Valencia

== Citroën ==
Season	Main colour(s)	Additional colour(s)	Main sponsor(s)	Additional major sponsor(s)
2025–26	Red, White, Blue	Black	Citroën	
2026–27	Red, White, Blue	Black	Citroën	TotalEnergies

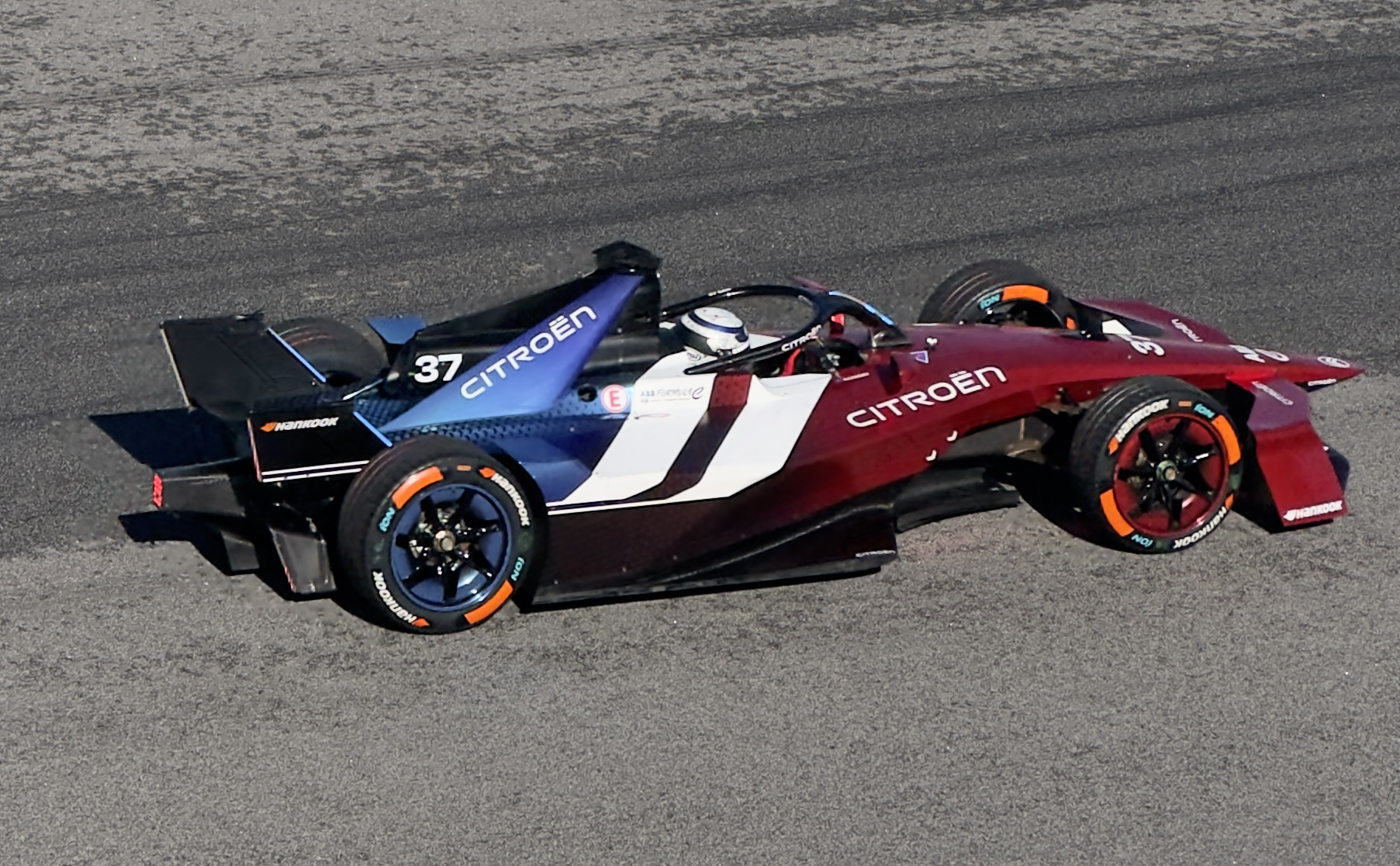
Nick Cassidy driving the Formula E Gen3 EVO at 2025 the Pre-test season in Valencia

== e.dams ==
Season	Main colour(s)	Additional colour(s)	Main sponsor(s)	Additional major sponsor(s)
2014–15	Blue, Yellow	White	Renault	8JS, Richard Mille
2015–16	Blue, Yellow	White	Renault	8JS, LEMO, Richard Mille
2016–17	Blue, Yellow	Black	Renault	8JS, HP, LEMO, Richard Mille
2017–18	Blue	White, Black	Renault	8JS, HP, LEMO, Richard Mille
2018–19	Silver	Black, Red	Nissan	LEMO, Nismo, Richard Mille, Shell, Wingo
2019–20	Black	Red, Silver	Nissan	CFI, LEMO, Nismo, Richard Mille, Shell
2020–21	Black	Red, Silver	Nissan	CFI, DuPont, LEMO, Nismo, Nissan LEAF, Richard Mille, Shell
2021–22	Red	Black	Nissan	CFI, DuPont, Nismo, Nissan Ariya, Shell

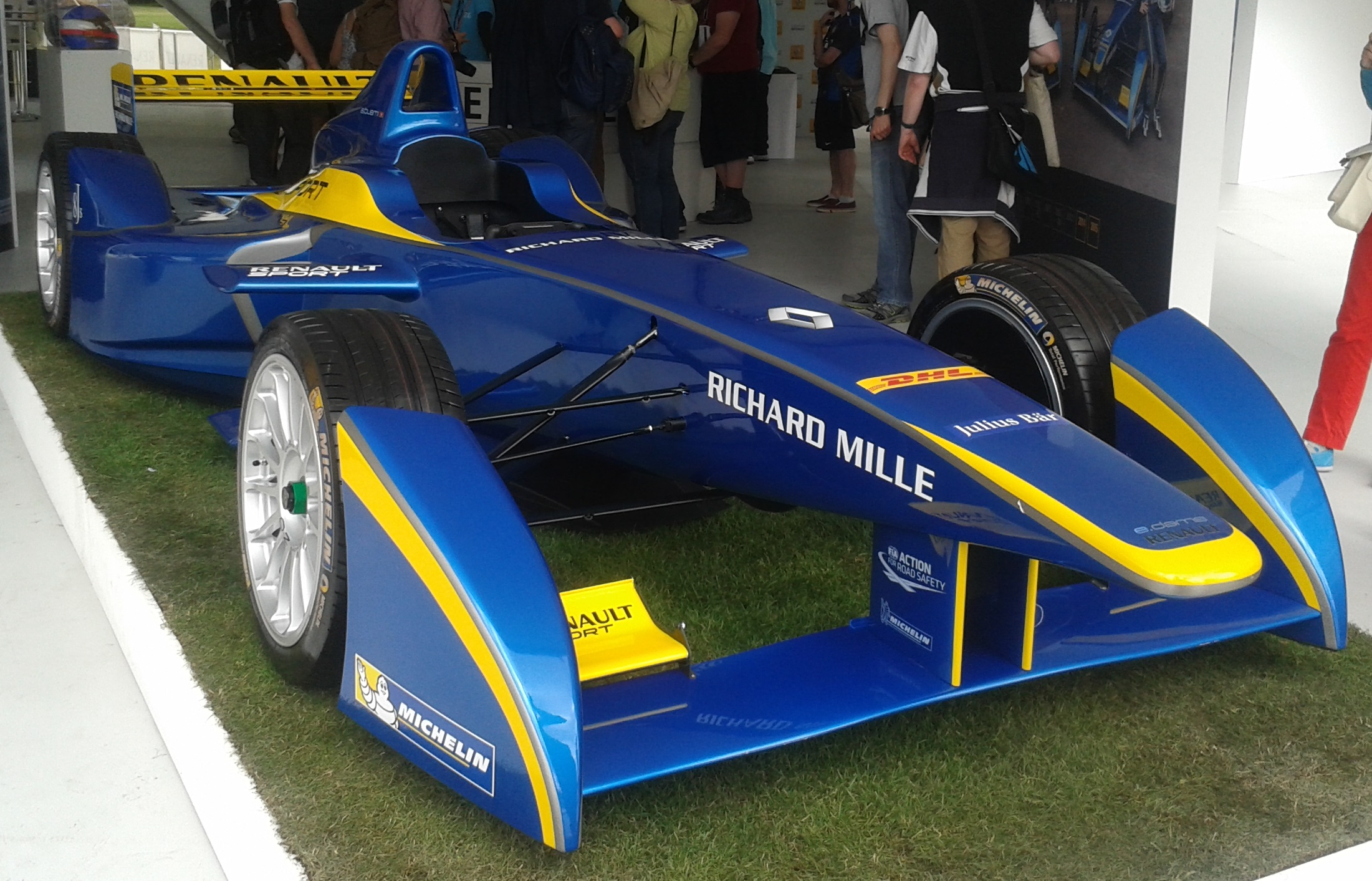
e.dams car at 2015 London ePrix

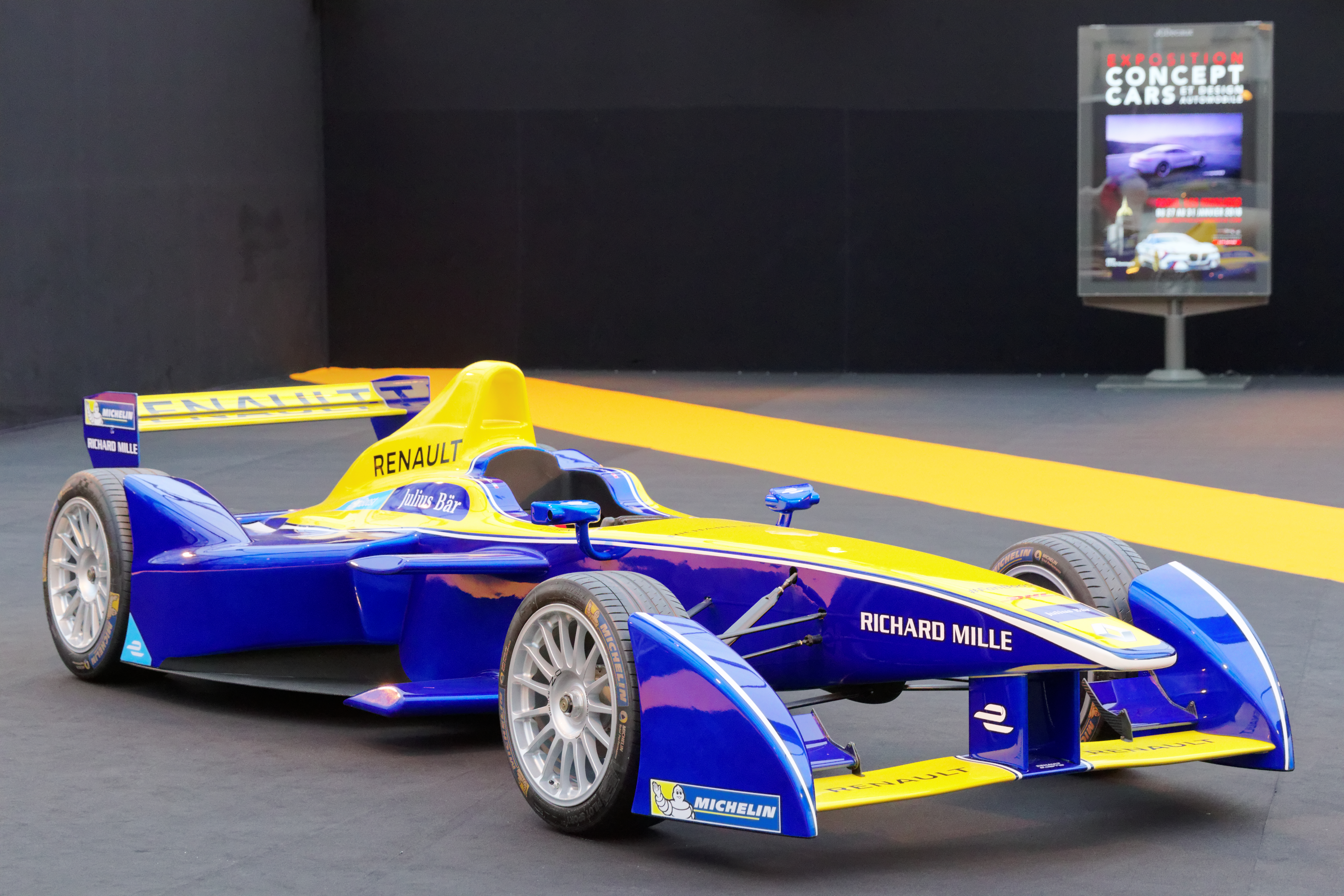
e.dams car at 2016 Festival Automobile International

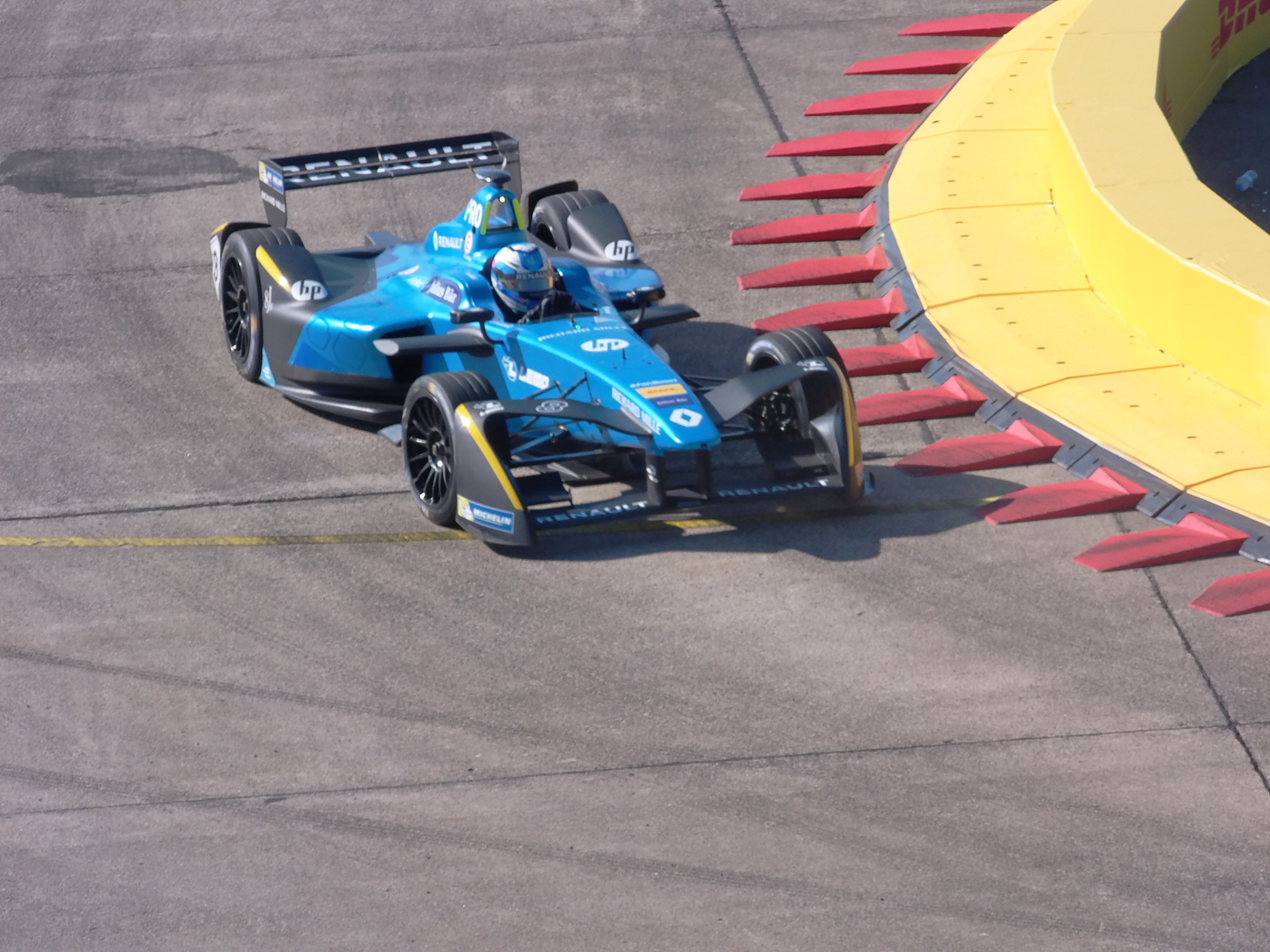
Nicolas Prost driving the Spark-Renault SRT 01E at 2017 Berlin ePrix

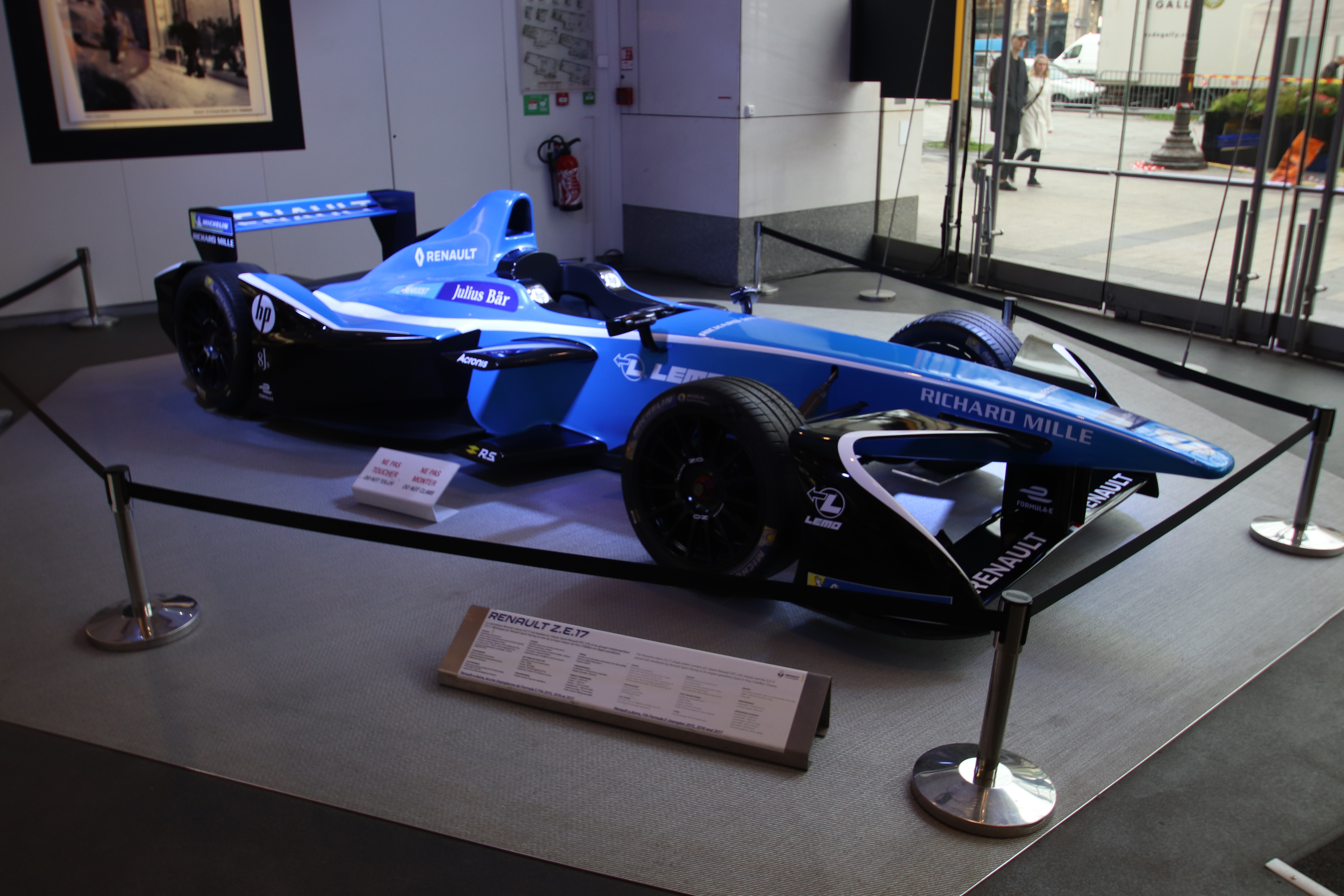
e.dams car at L'Atelier Renault

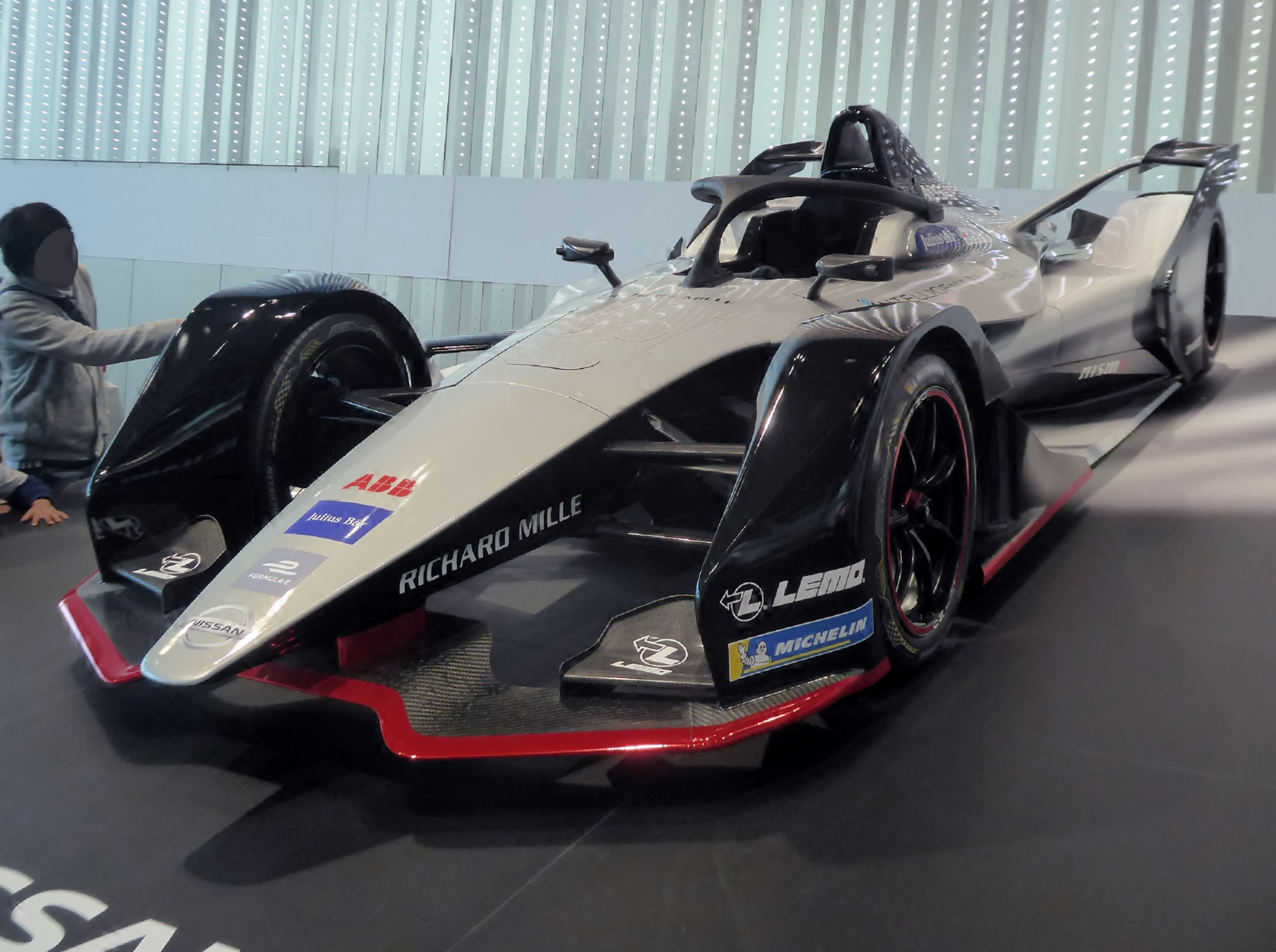
e.dams at Nissan Global Headquarters Gallery

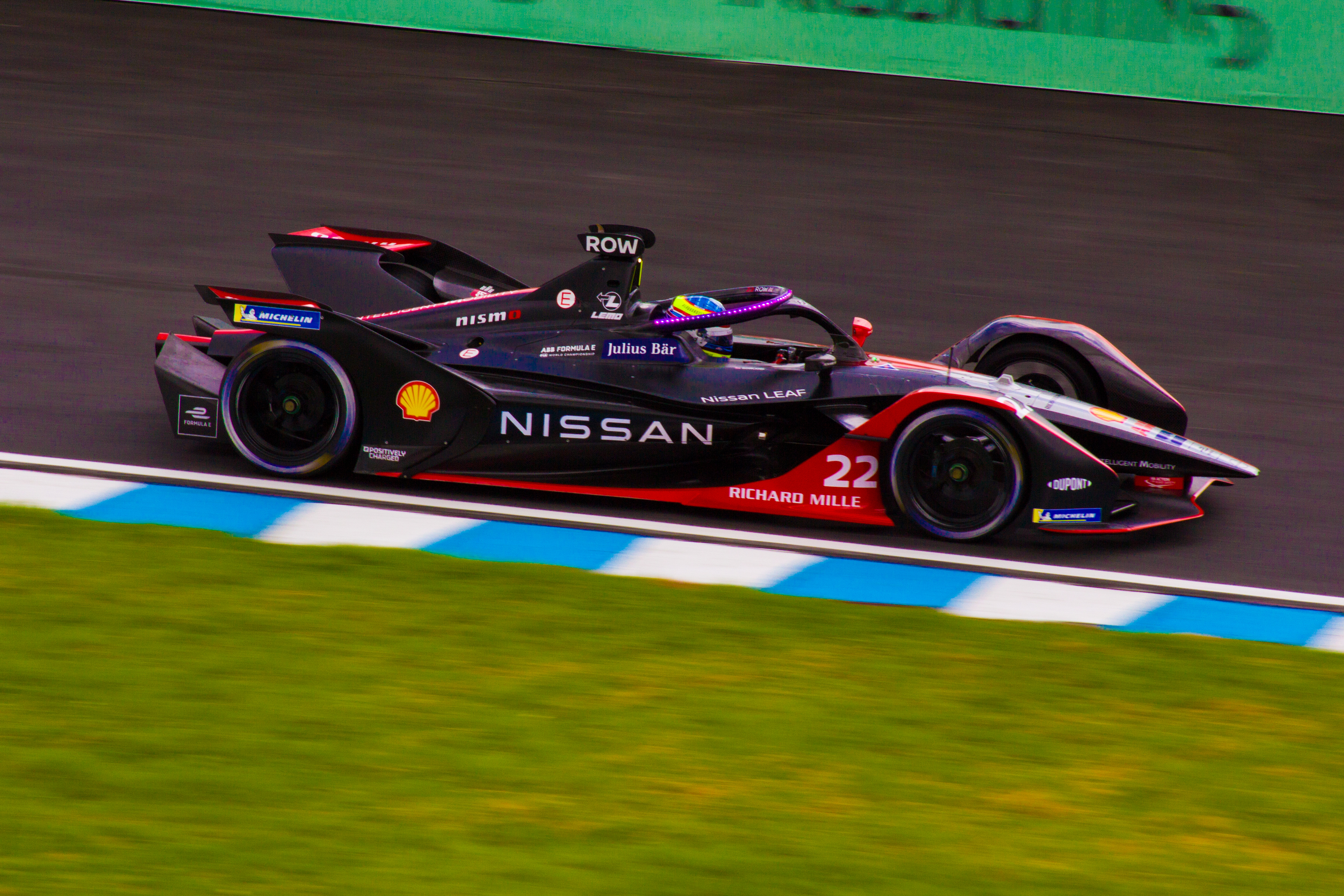
Oliver Rowland driving the Spark SRT05e at 2021 Puebla ePrix

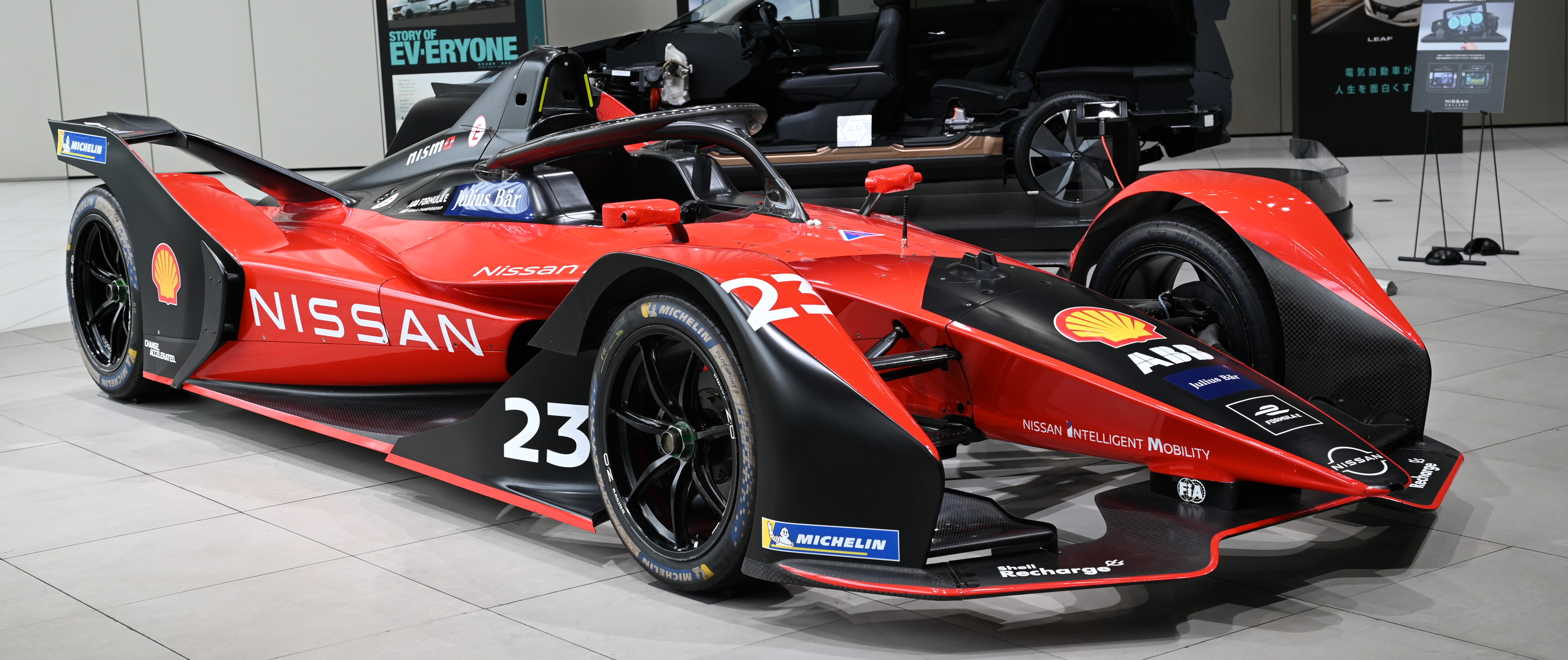
e.dams car at Nissan Global Headquarters Gallery

== Envision ==
Season	Main colour(s)	Additional colour(s)	Main sponsor(s)	Additional major sponsor(s)
2014–15	Silver, Violet	Red	Virgin	Arrow
2015–16	Black, Violet	Red, Silver	DS, Virgin	Arrow, Hewlett Packard Enterprise
2016–17	Black, Violet	Red, Silver	DS, Virgin	Hewlett Packard Enterprise, Kaspersky Lab, Total
2017–18	Black, Violet	Red, Silver	DS, Virgin	Hewlett Packard Enterprise, Kaspersky Lab, Total
2018–19	Violet	Gray, Red	Virgin, Envision	Genpact, Harley Davidson, Kaspersky Lab, Stanley
2019–20	Violet	Gray, Red	Virgin, Envision	Genpact, Harley Davidson, Stanley, Teijin
2020–21	Violet	White, Red	Virgin, Envision	Genpact, Harley Davidson, Stanley, Teijin
2021–22	Green, Violet	White	Envision	Algorand, Genpact, Johnson Matthey, Palo Alto, Teijin
2022–23	Green, Violet	White	Envision	Algorand, EV Metals, Palo Alto, Teijin
2023–24	Green, Violet	White	Envision	Algorand, EV Metals, New Scientist, Palo Alto, Pulsar Helium, Teijin
2024–25	Green, Violet	White	Envision	Algorand, Cartoon Network, New Scientist, OMP, Randstad, Sand Technologies, Superdry, Teijin
2025–26	Green, Violet	White	Envision	Algorand, OMP, Sand Technologies, Superdry & Co, Teijin
2026–27	Green, Violet	White	Envision, Paysafe	OMP, Sand Technologies, Teijin

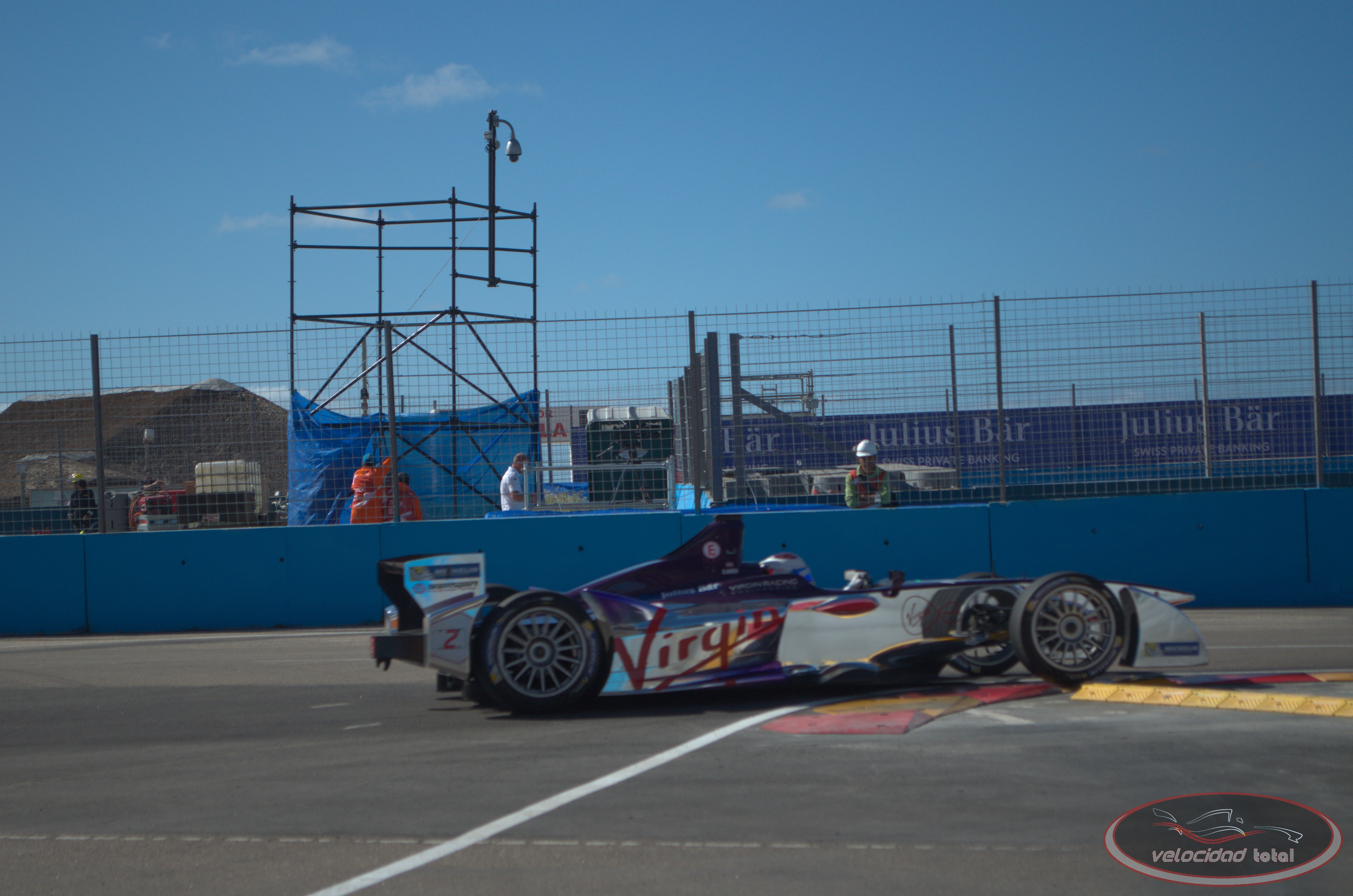
Sam Bird driving the Spark-Renault SRT 01E at 2014 Punta del Este ePrix

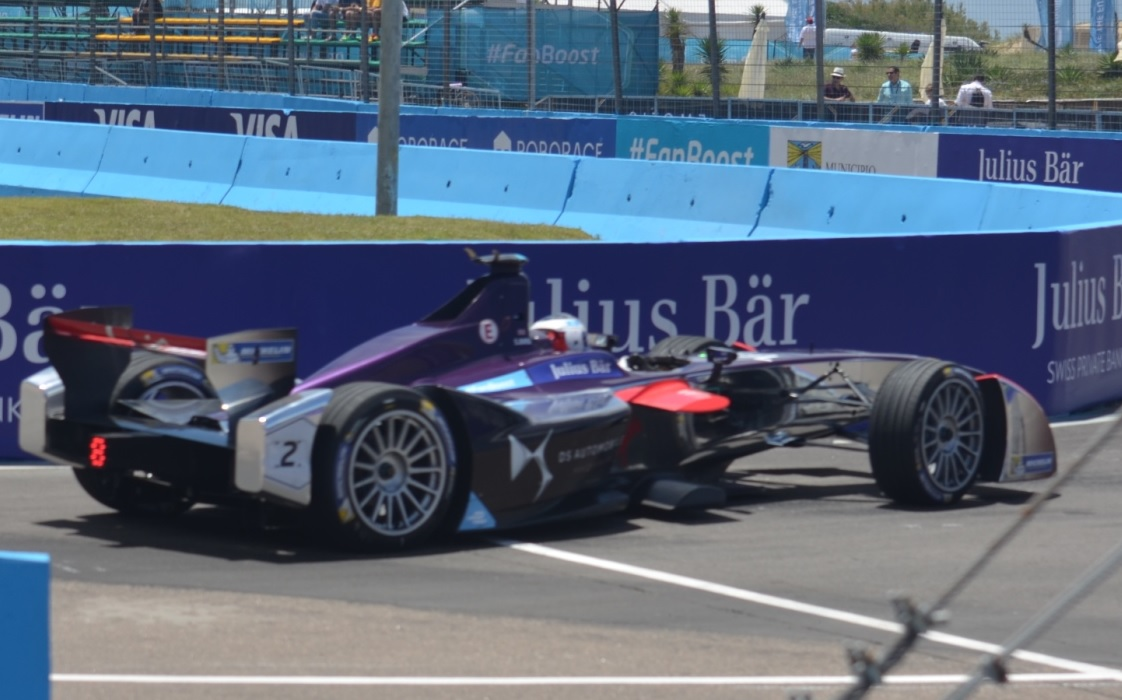
Sam Bird driving the Spark-Renault SRT 01E at 2015 Punta del Este ePrix

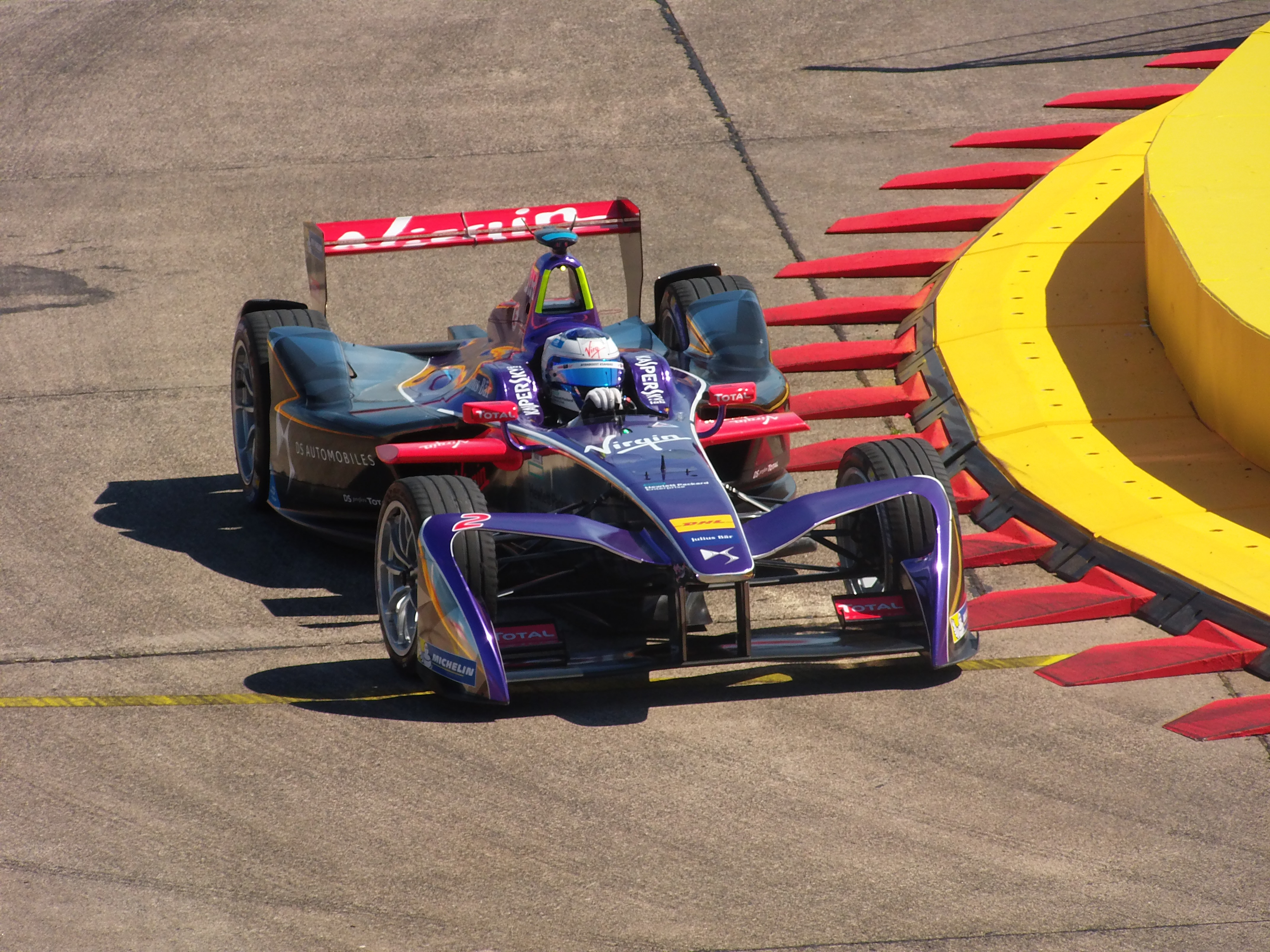
Sam Bird driving the Spark-Renault SRT 01E at 2017 Berlin ePrix

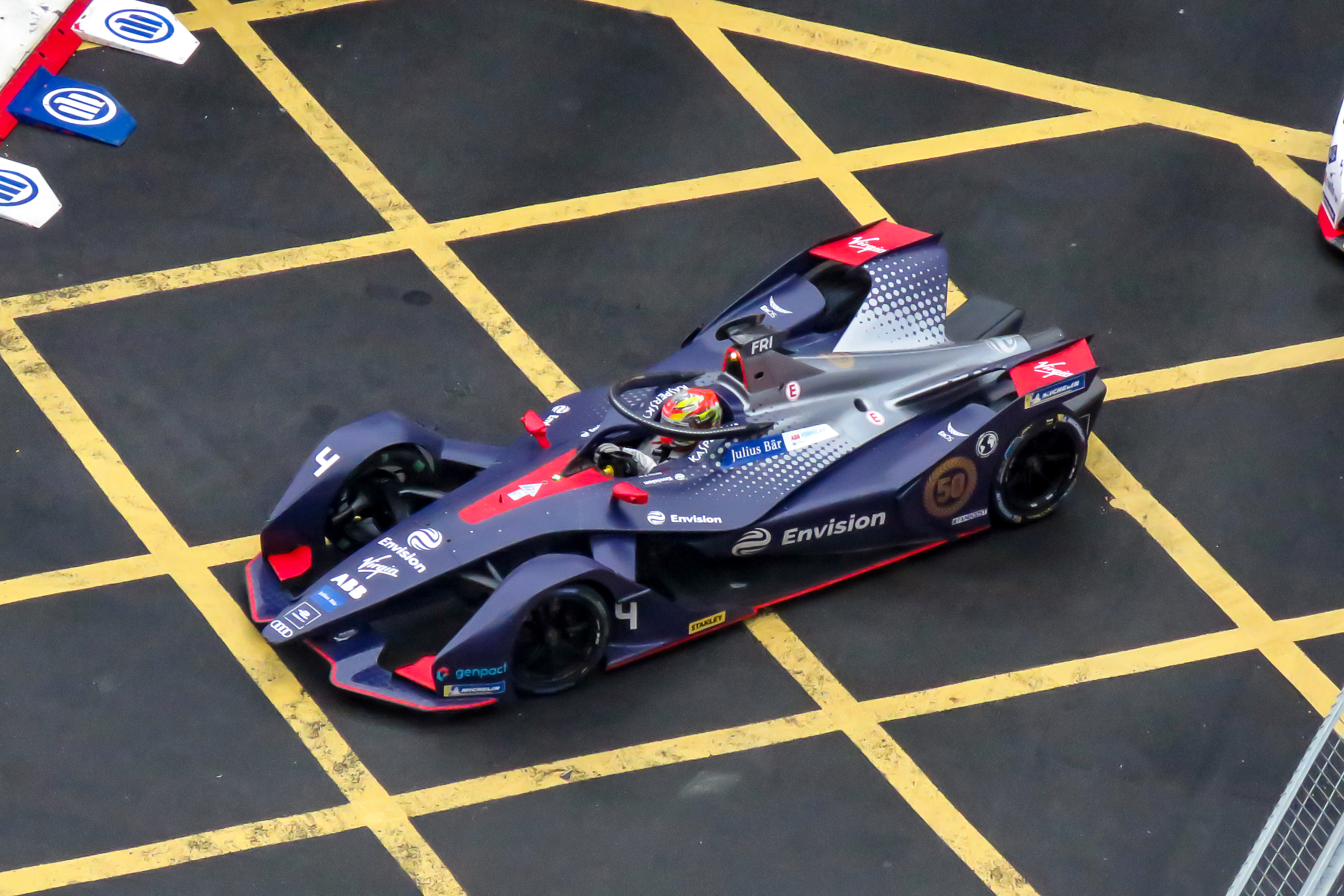
Robin Frijns driving the Spark SRT05e at 2019 Hong Kong ePrix

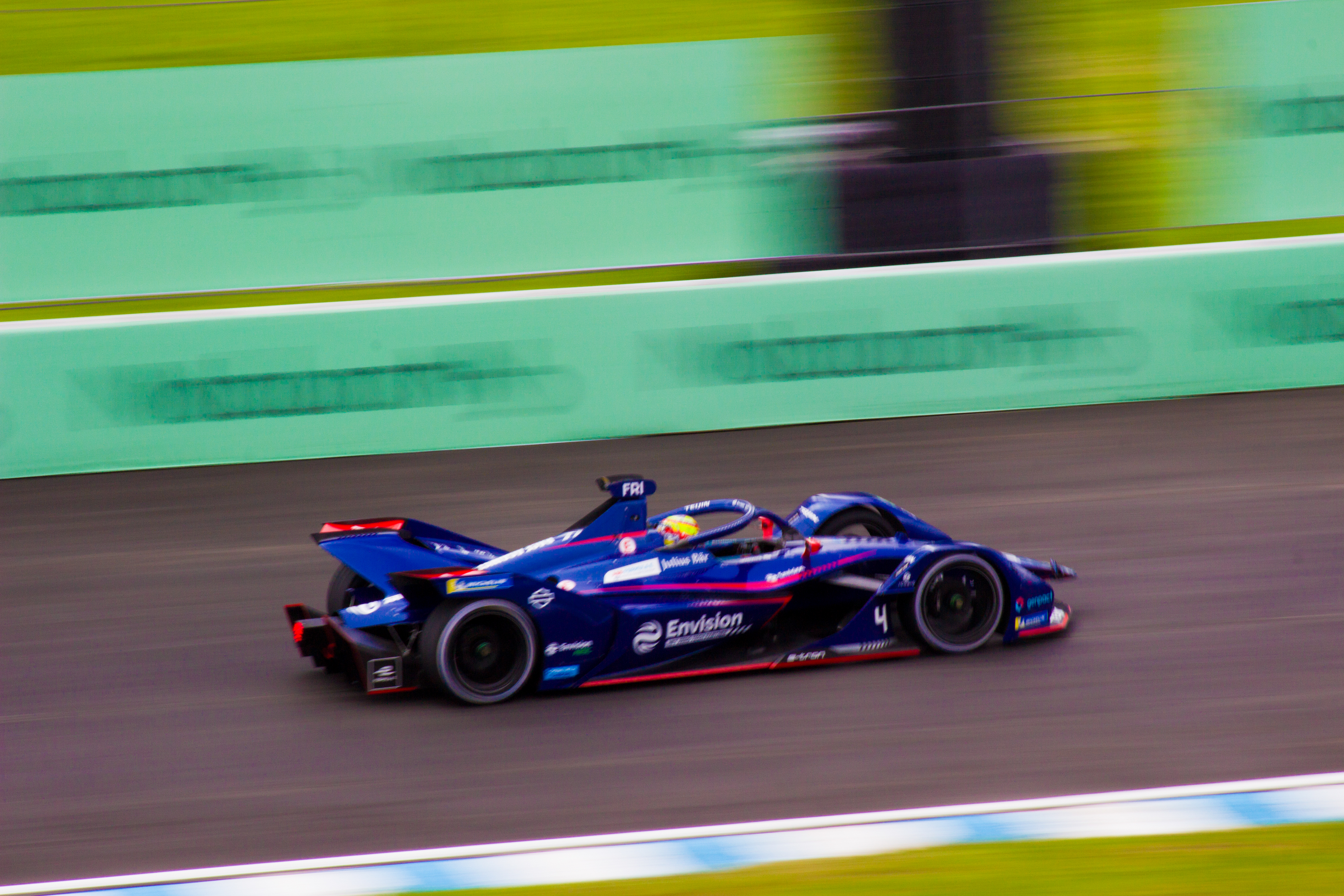
Robin Frijns driving the Spark SRT05e at 2021 Puebla ePrix

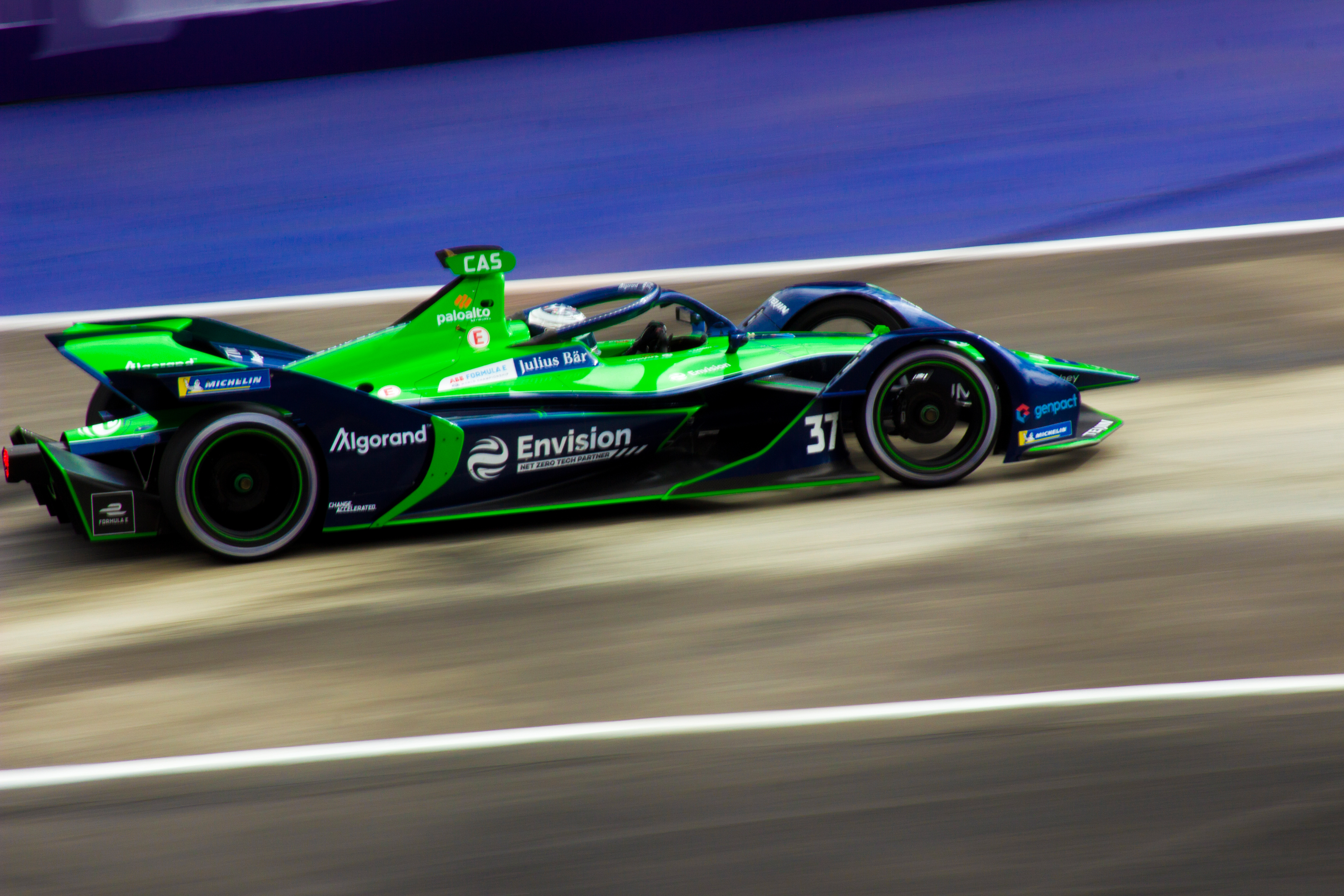
Nick Cassidy driving the Spark SRT05e at 2022 Mexico City ePrix

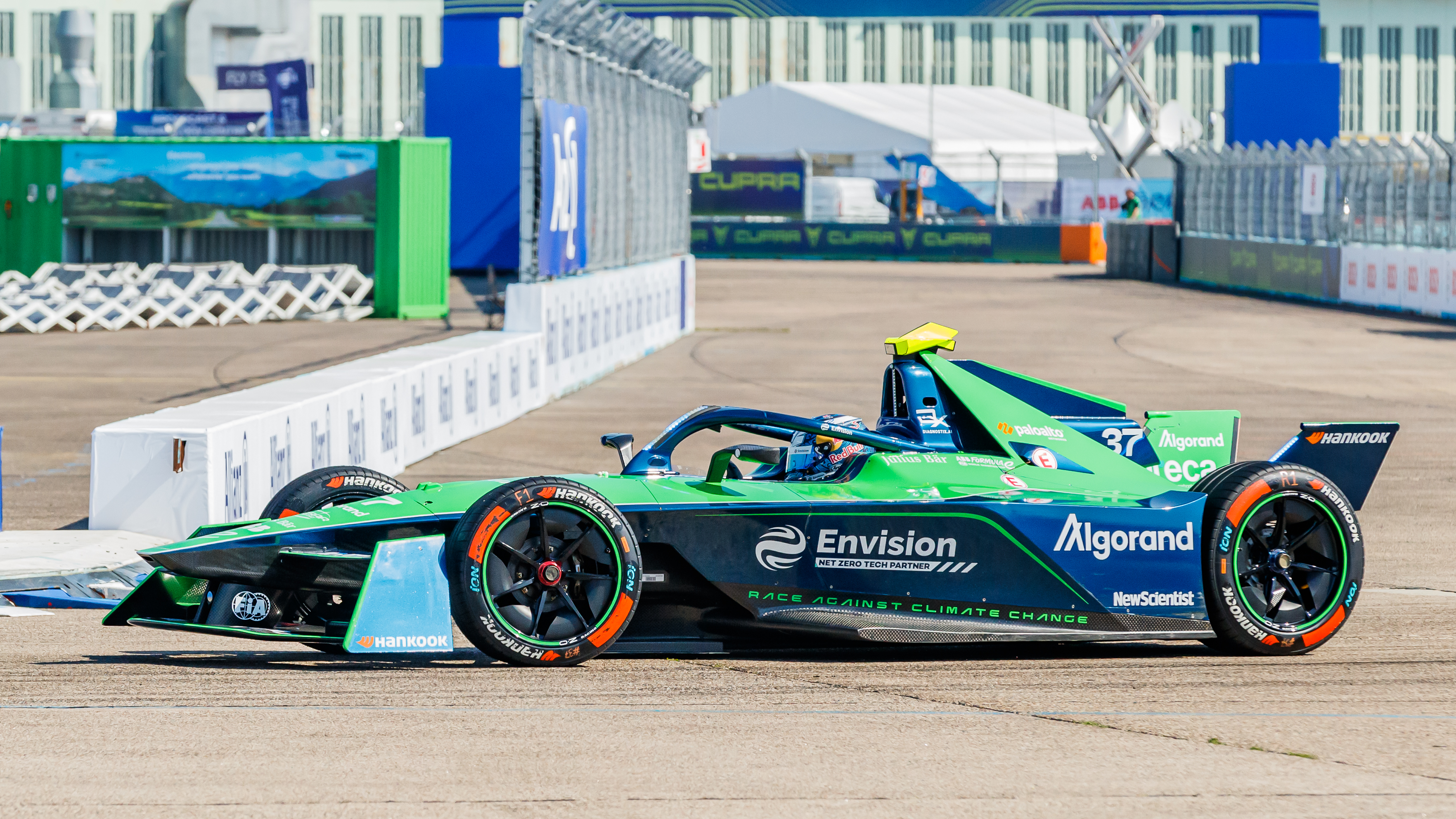
Nick Cassidy driving the Formula E Gen3 at 2023 Berlin ePrix

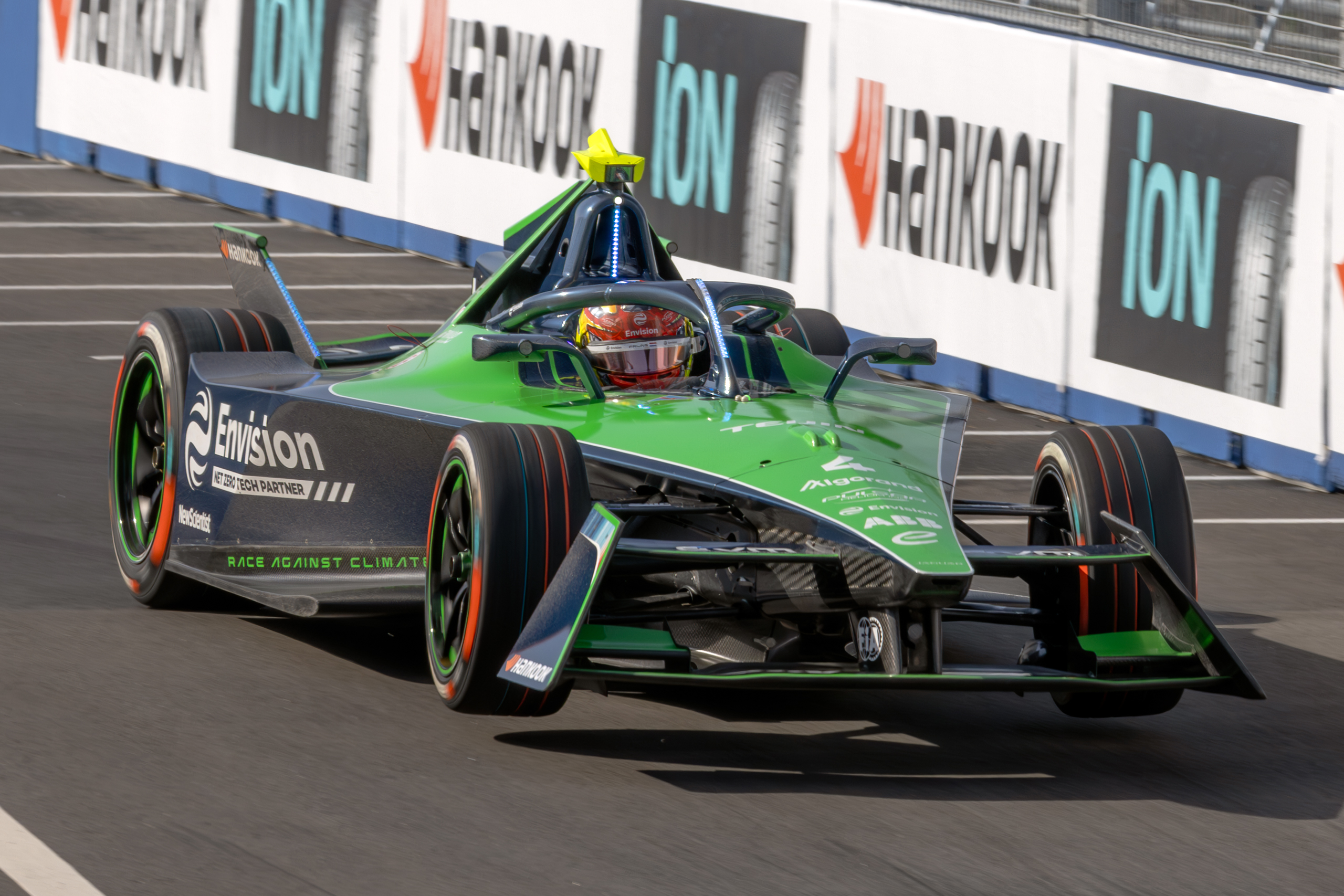
Robin Frijns driving the Formula E Gen3 at 2024 Tokyo ePrix

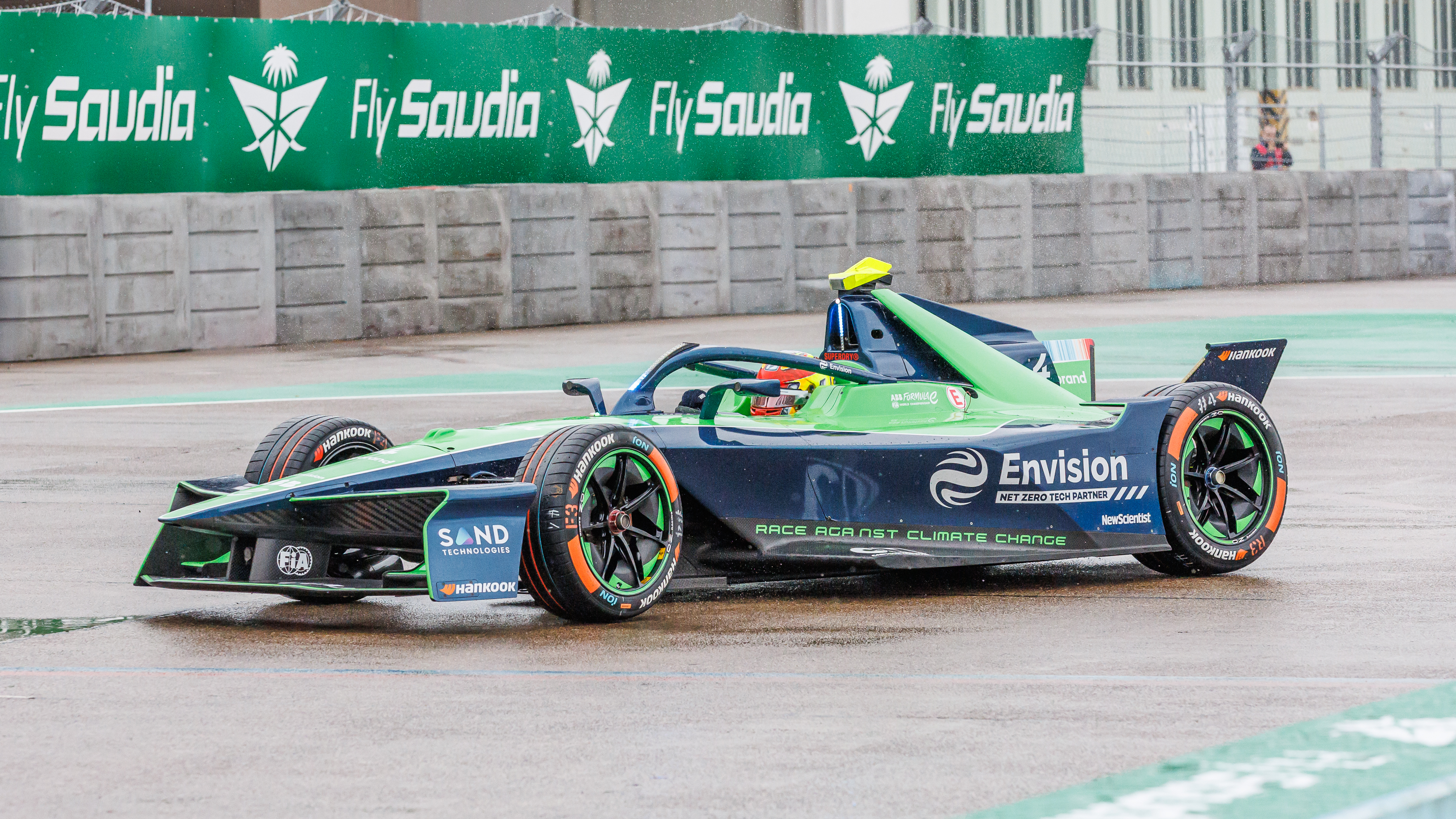
Robin Frijns driving the Formula E Gen3 EVO at 2025 Berlin ePrix

== Fortescue ==
Season	Main colour(s)	Additional colour(s)	Main sponsor(s)	Additional major sponsor(s)
2026–27	Green, Black		Fortescue Zero	Elysia, Nabrawind

== Fusion ==
Season	Main colour(s)	Additional colour(s)	Main sponsor(s)	Additional major sponsor(s)
2026–27	Yellow, Black			AURA, Automobiles Etcetera, Bloume, Crumb., Hotspot Shield, Neutonic, Metro Supply Chain, Onyx., OpenByte, SociaLite, TOTALAV

== HWA ==
Season	Main colour(s)	Additional colour(s)	Main sponsor(s)	Additional major sponsor(s)
2018–19	Black	Blue		ITW Schinder, Mahle, Tricorp Workwear, Wallbox

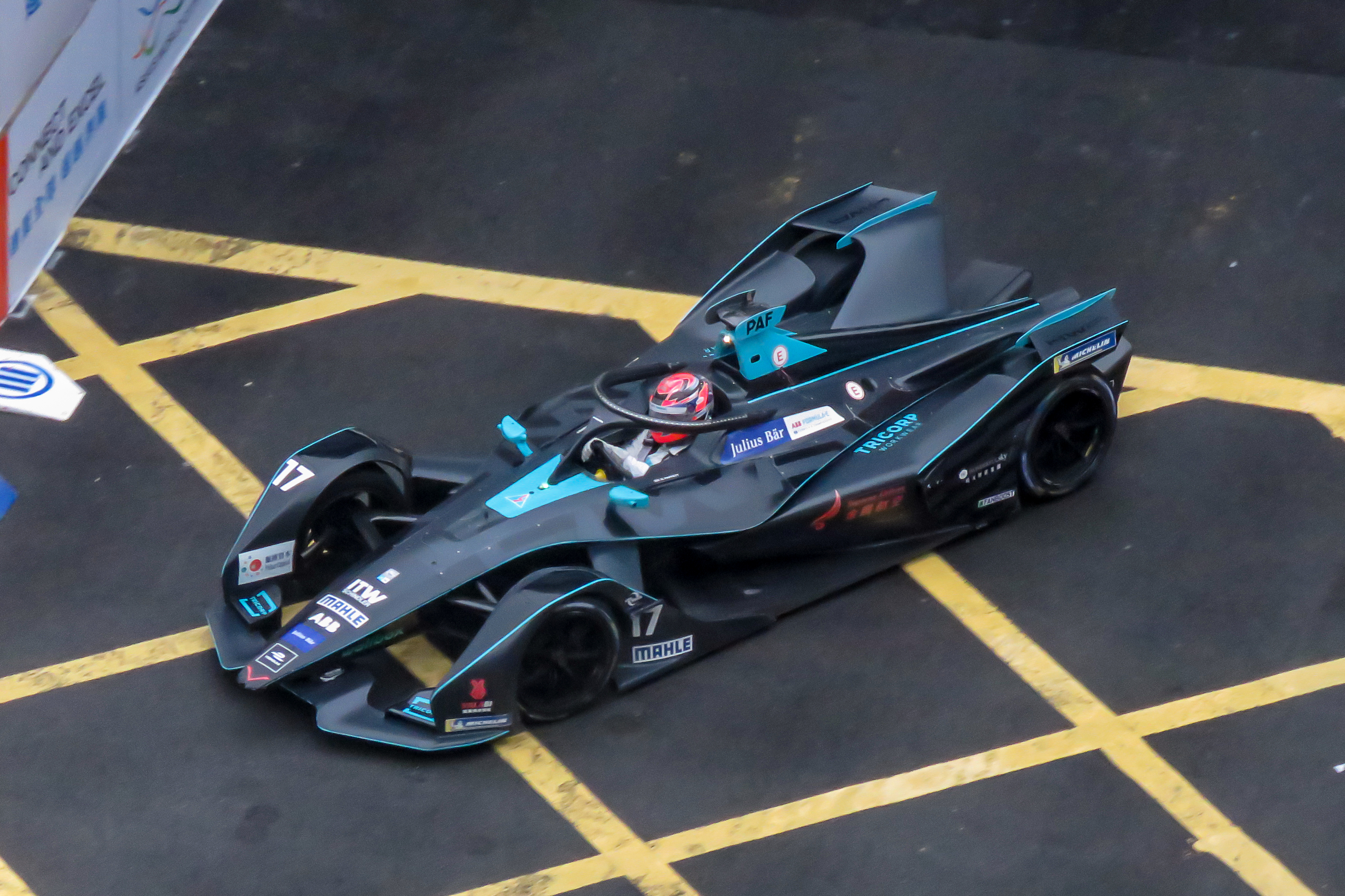
Gary Paffett driving the Spark SRT05e at 2019 Hong Kong ePrix

== Jaguar ==
Season	Main colour(s)	Additional colour(s)	Main sponsor(s)	Additional major sponsor(s)	Special liveries
2016–17	Black	Blue	Jaguar, Panasonic	Lear	
2017–18	Black	Blue	Jaguar, Panasonic	GKN Automotive, Viessmann	
2018–19	Black	Blue	Jaguar, Panasonic	GKN Automotive, Viessmann	
2019–20	Black	Blue	Jaguar, Panasonic	Castrol, GKN Automotive, Viessmann	
2020–21	Black	Blue	Jaguar	Castrol, Dow, DR1VA, GKN Automotive, Viessmann	
2021–22	Black	Blue	Jaguar, TCS	Castrol, Dow, GKN Automotive, Micro Focus, Vertica	
2022–23	Black	White, Gold	Jaguar, TCS	Castrol, Dow, GKN Automotive, Micro Focus, OpenText, Wolfspeed	
2023–24	Black	White, Silver	Jaguar, TCS	Castrol, Dow, OpenText, Wolfspeed	At 2024 Tokyo ePrix Jaguar celebrated their 100th race in Formula E by putting '100' on their sidepods.
2024–25	Black	White, Gold	Jaguar, TCS	Aero, Castrol, Dow, Google Cloud, Wolfspeed	
2025–26	Black	White, Gold	Jaguar, TCS	Castrol, Chase, Dow	
2026–27	Blue, Black	White	Jaguar, TCS	Castrol, Chase, Dow, Elysia	

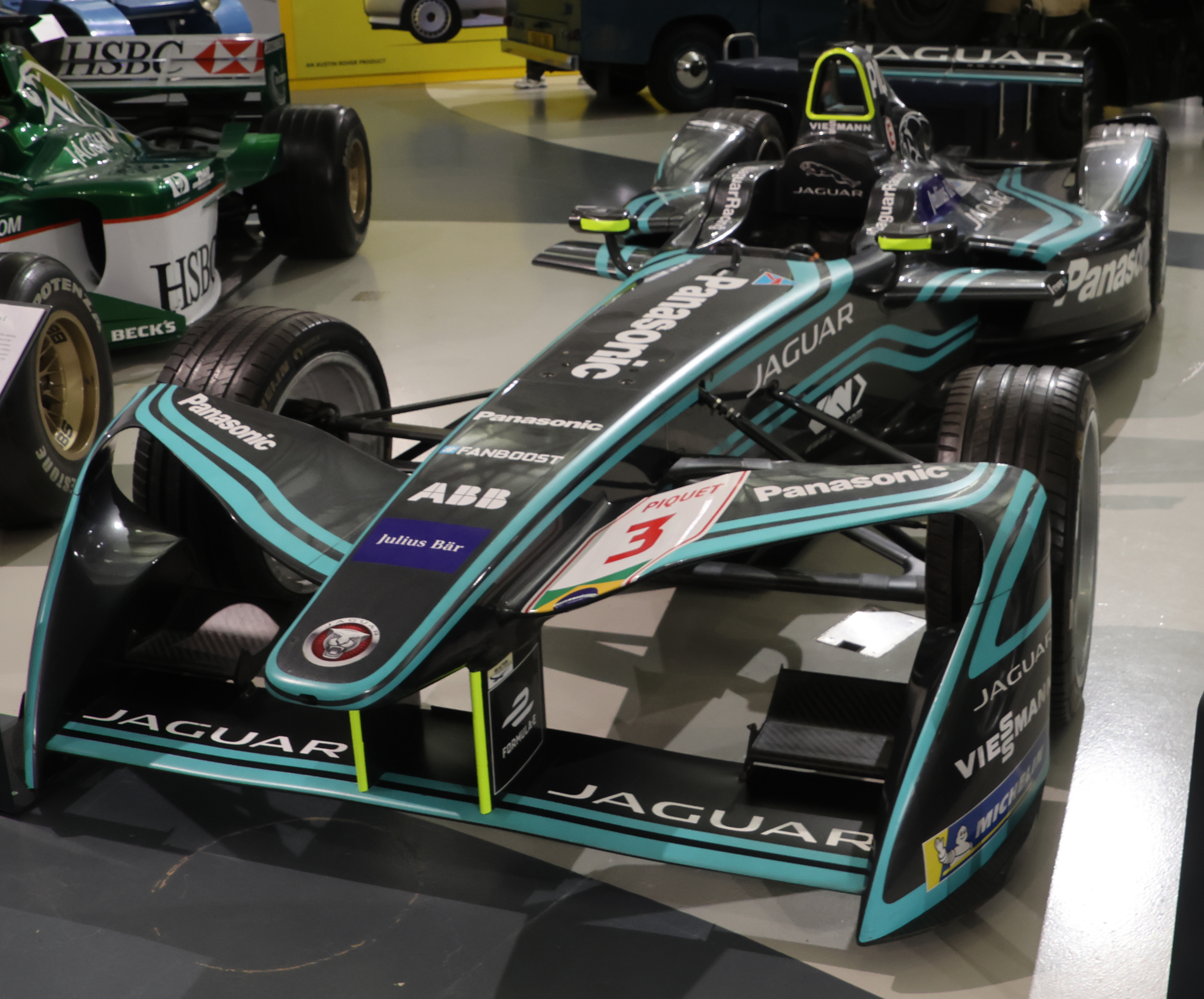
Jaguar car at British Motor Museum

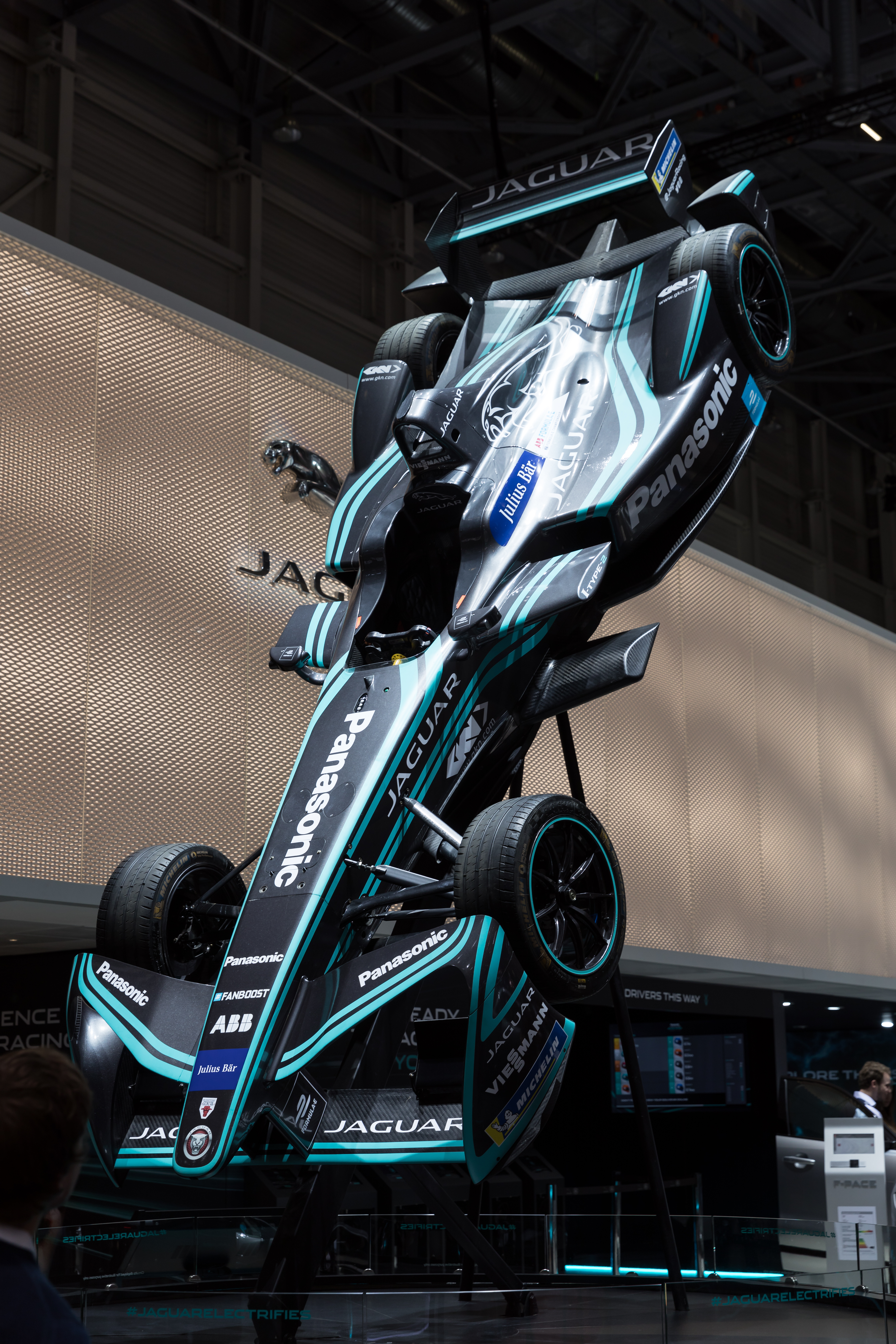
Jaguar car at 2018 Geneva International Motor Show

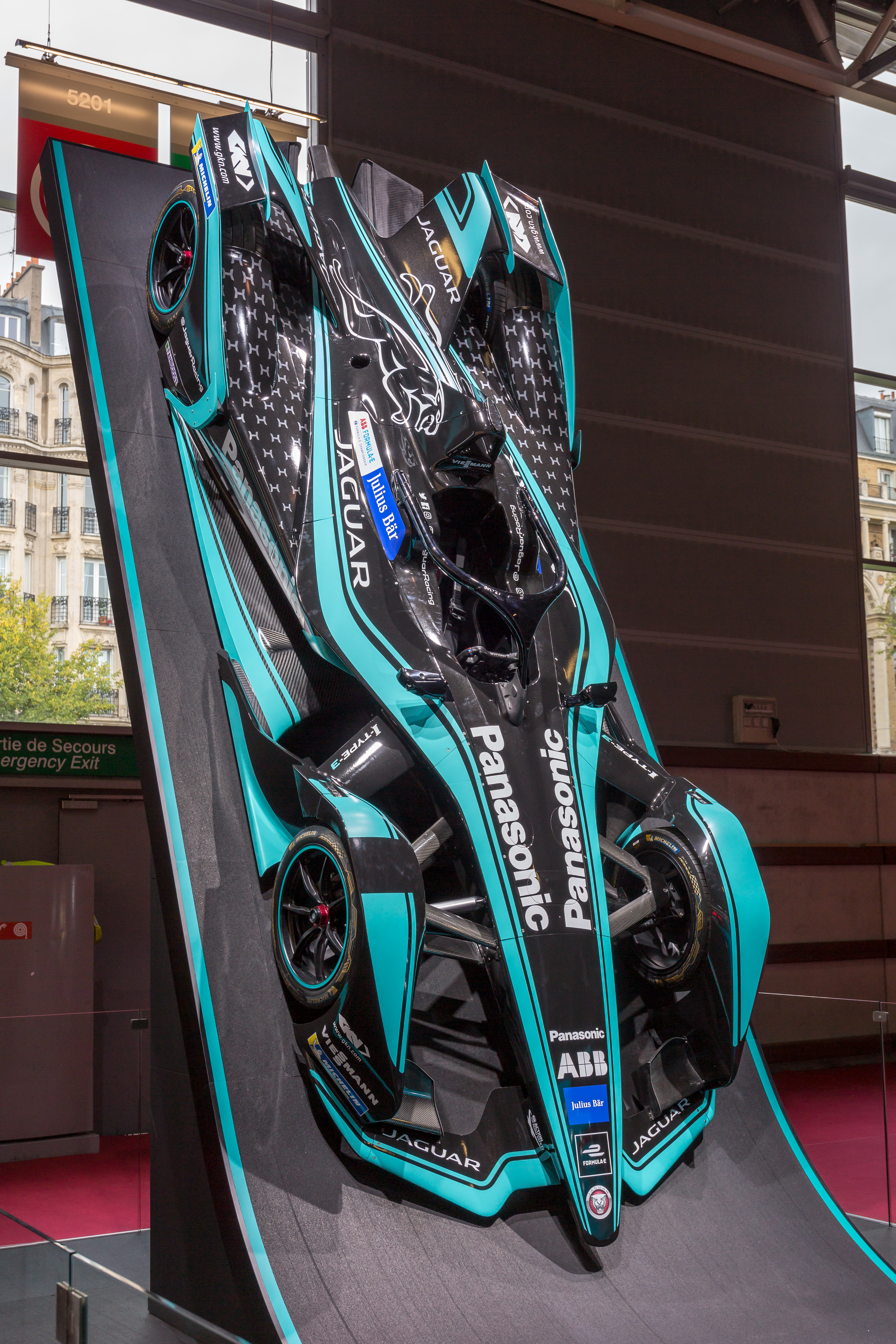
Jaguar car at 2018 Paris Motor Show

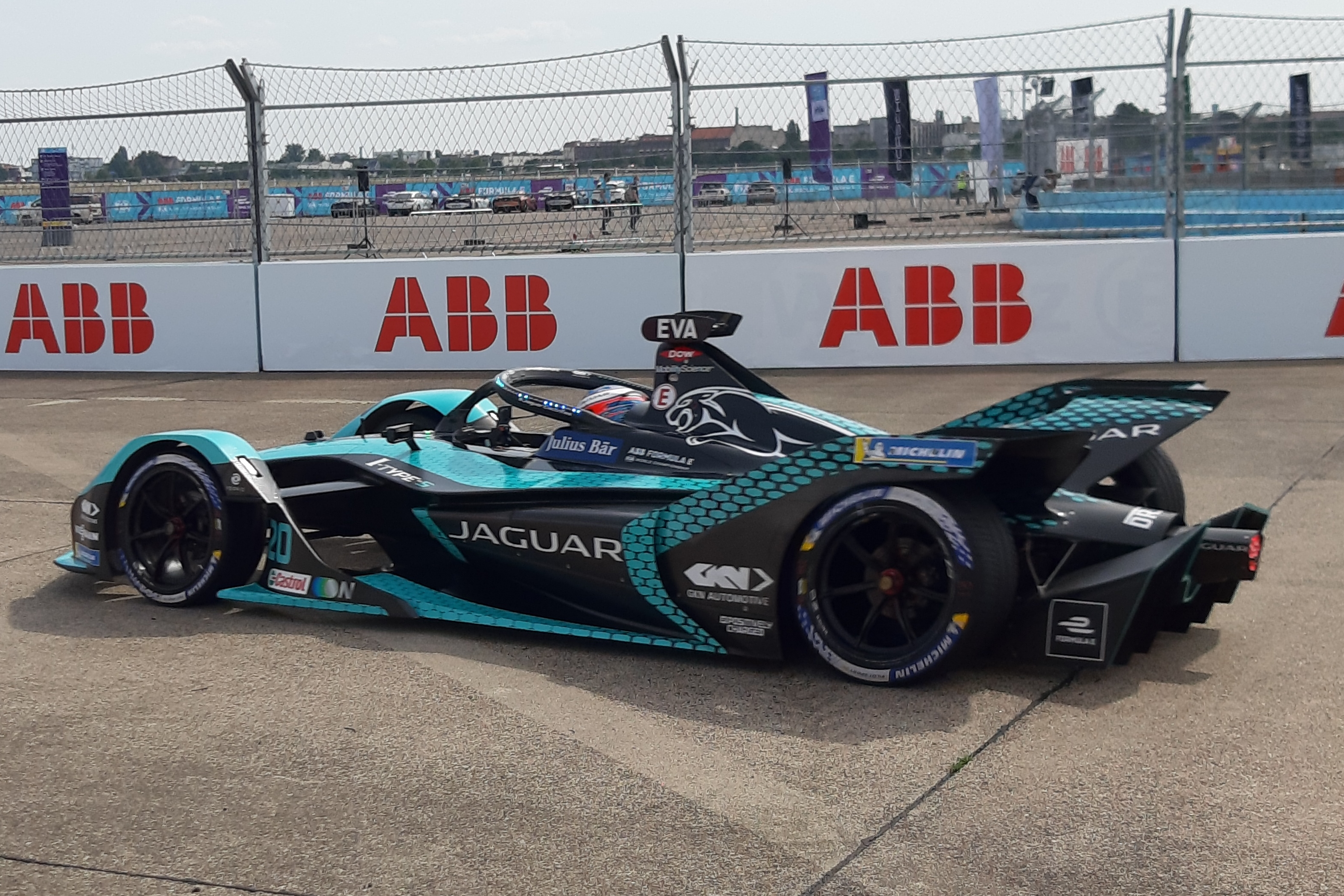
Mitch Evans driving the Spark SRT05e at 2021 Berlin ePrix

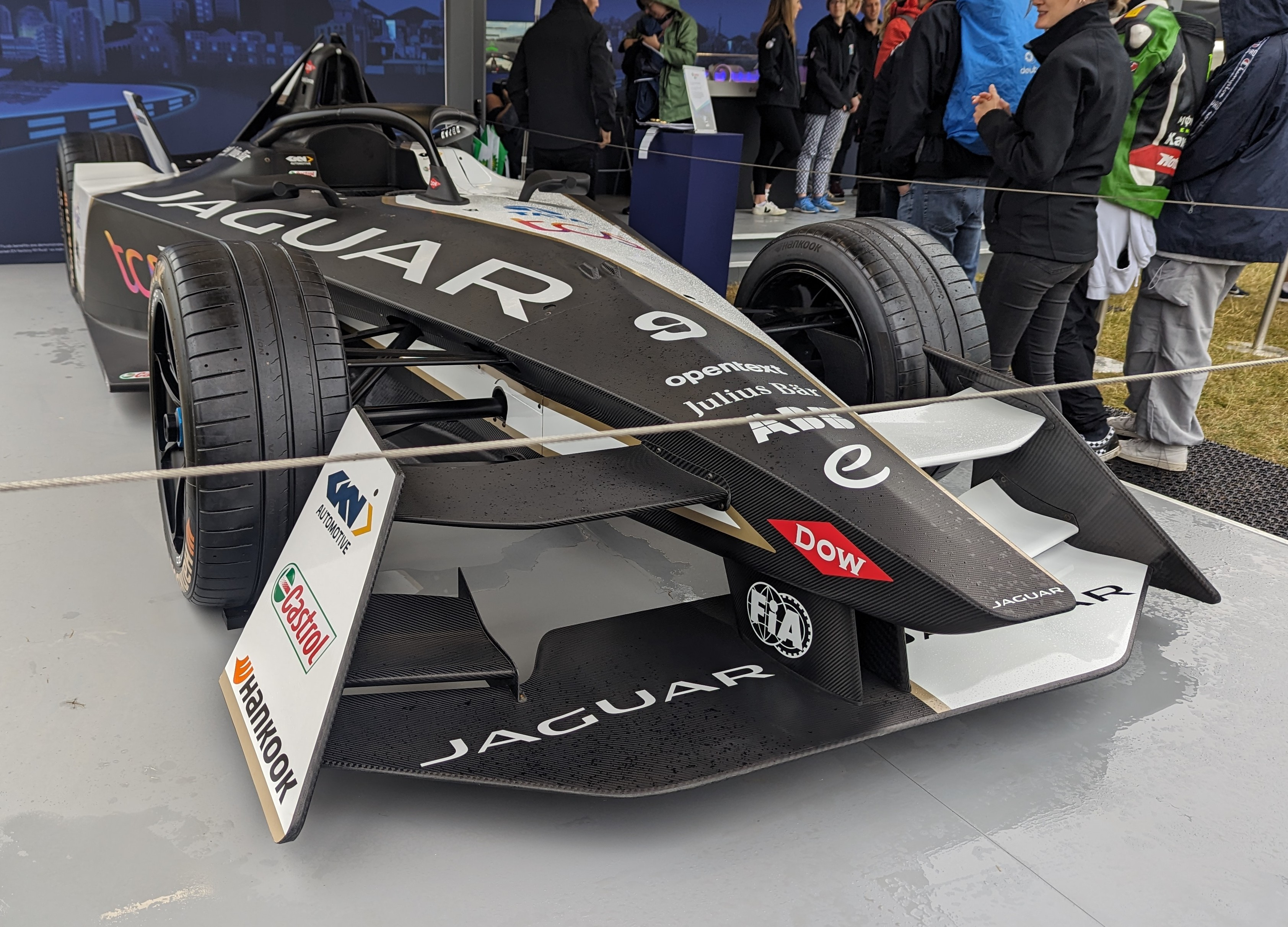
Jaguar car at 2023 Goodwood Festival of Speed

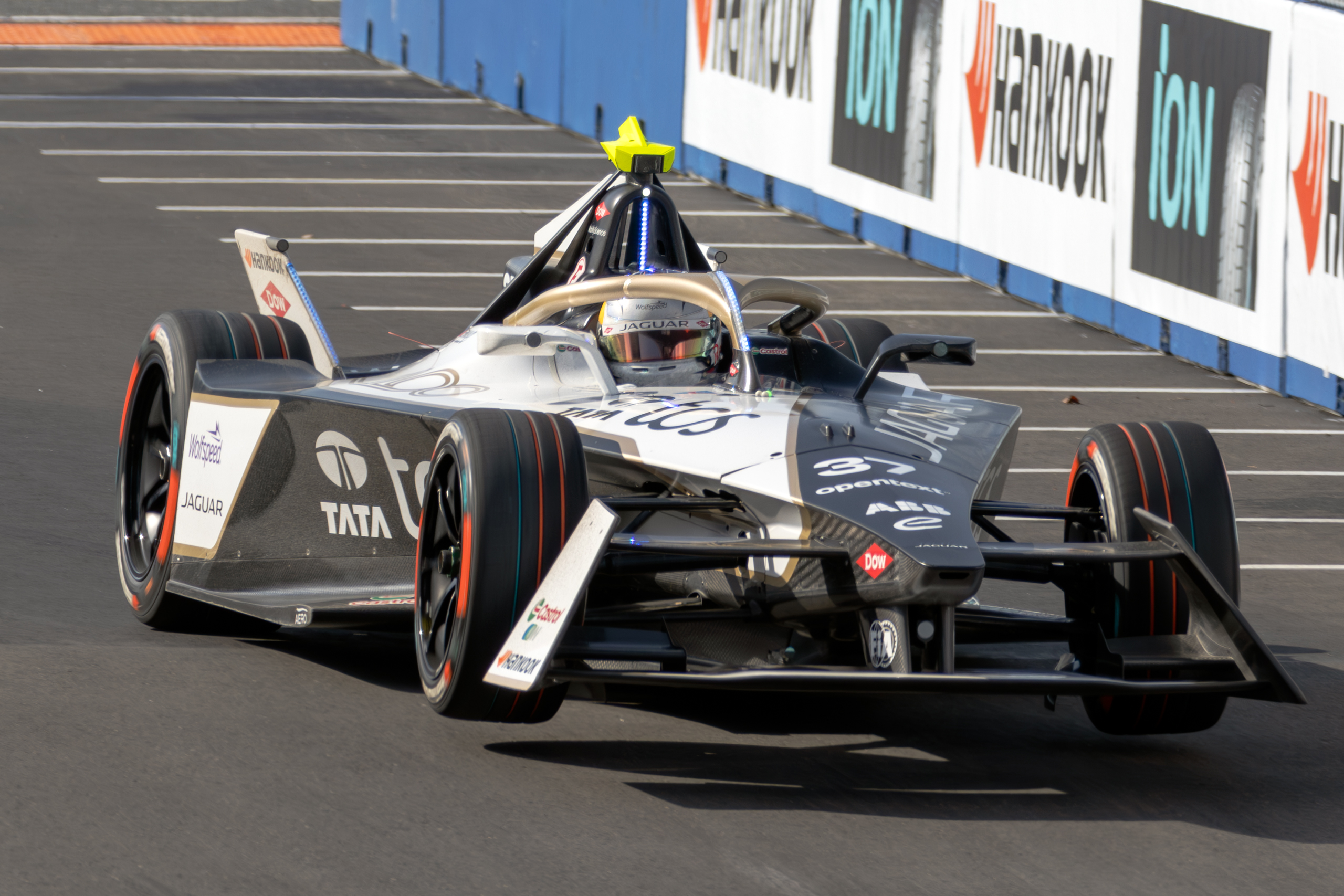
Nick Cassidy driving the Formula E Gen3 at 2024 Tokyo ePrix

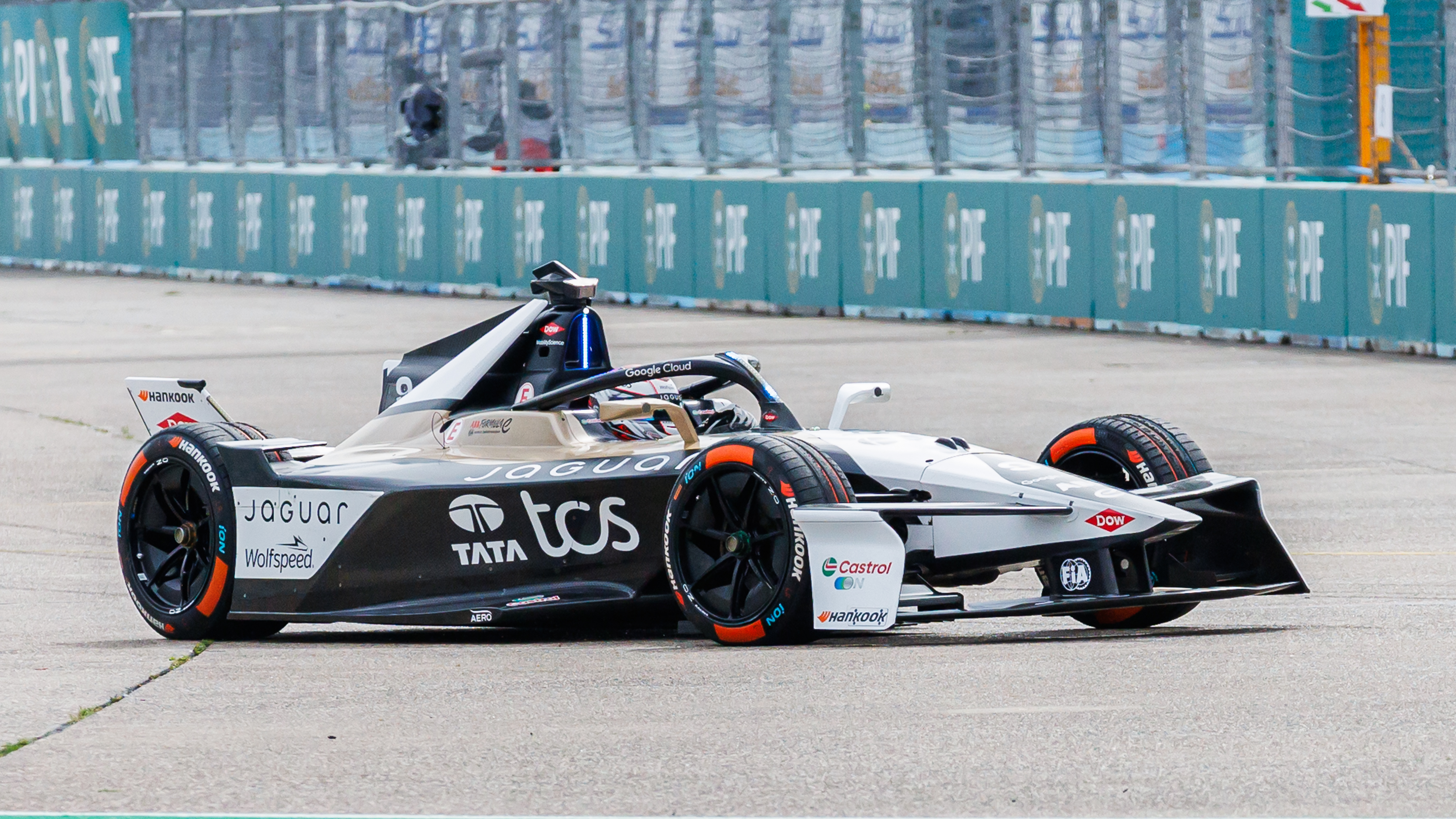
Mitch Evans driving the Formula E Gen3 EVO at 2025 Berlin ePrix

== Kiro ==
Season	Main colour(s)	Additional colour(s)	Main sponsor(s)	Additional major sponsor(s)	Special liveries
2014–15	Red	Yellow		Autocar, Exim Bank, Henkel, Molex, Mouser, Omni Gear, Vishay	
2014–15	Gray	Yellow	NEXTEV	Autocar, Exim Bank, Henkel, Jacob Zuma Foundation, Molex, Mouser, Omni Gear, TRS, Vishay	
2015–16	Gray, Turquiose	Blue	NEXTEV	Henkel, Jack & Jones, Lodgeo, Motorsport.com, Omni Gear, RVT	
2016–17	Blue	Black	NEXTEV	Nio, RVT, SiliconCore	
2017–18	Blue	Black	Nio	NEXTEV, EVBOX, Jack & Jones	
2018–19	Blue	White	Nio	Acronis	
2019–20	Blue, White	Black	Nio	Acronis, The Peninsula Hong Kong	
2020–21	Blue	Black	Nio	Acronis, Shanghai Lisheng Racing	
2021–22	Blue	Red, Black	Nio	Shanghai Lisheng Racing	
2022–23	Blue, Red	White, Black	Nio	Lisheng Sports, ZeroNox	
2023–24	Gray	Yellow		Gusto Engineering, Icelandic Glacial, LET Group, Lisheng Sports	
2024–25	Yellow, Copper	Black	Cupra	MrBeast Feastables, Bumbu Rum Co. (2025)	The team supported movies Thunderbolts* at the 2025 Miami and Monaco ePrix respectively.
2025–26	Yellow, Copper	Black	Cupra	Aquame, Duelbits	The team supported movies Hoppers at the 2026 Jeddah ePrix respectively. The team supported movies Masters of the Universe at the 2026 Monaco ePrix respectively.
2026–27	Yellow, Copper	Black	Cupra		

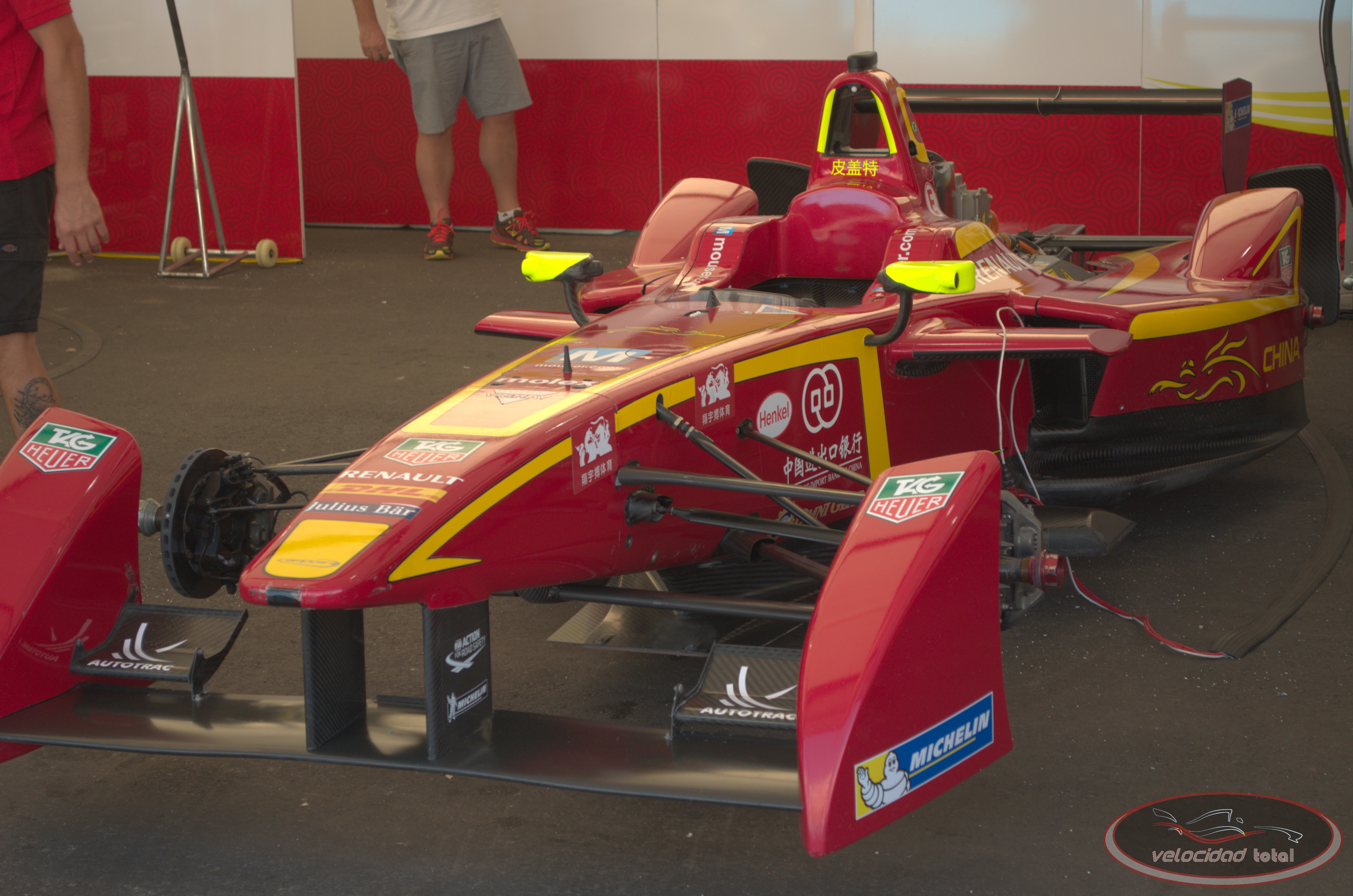
TCR car at 2014 Punta del Este ePrix

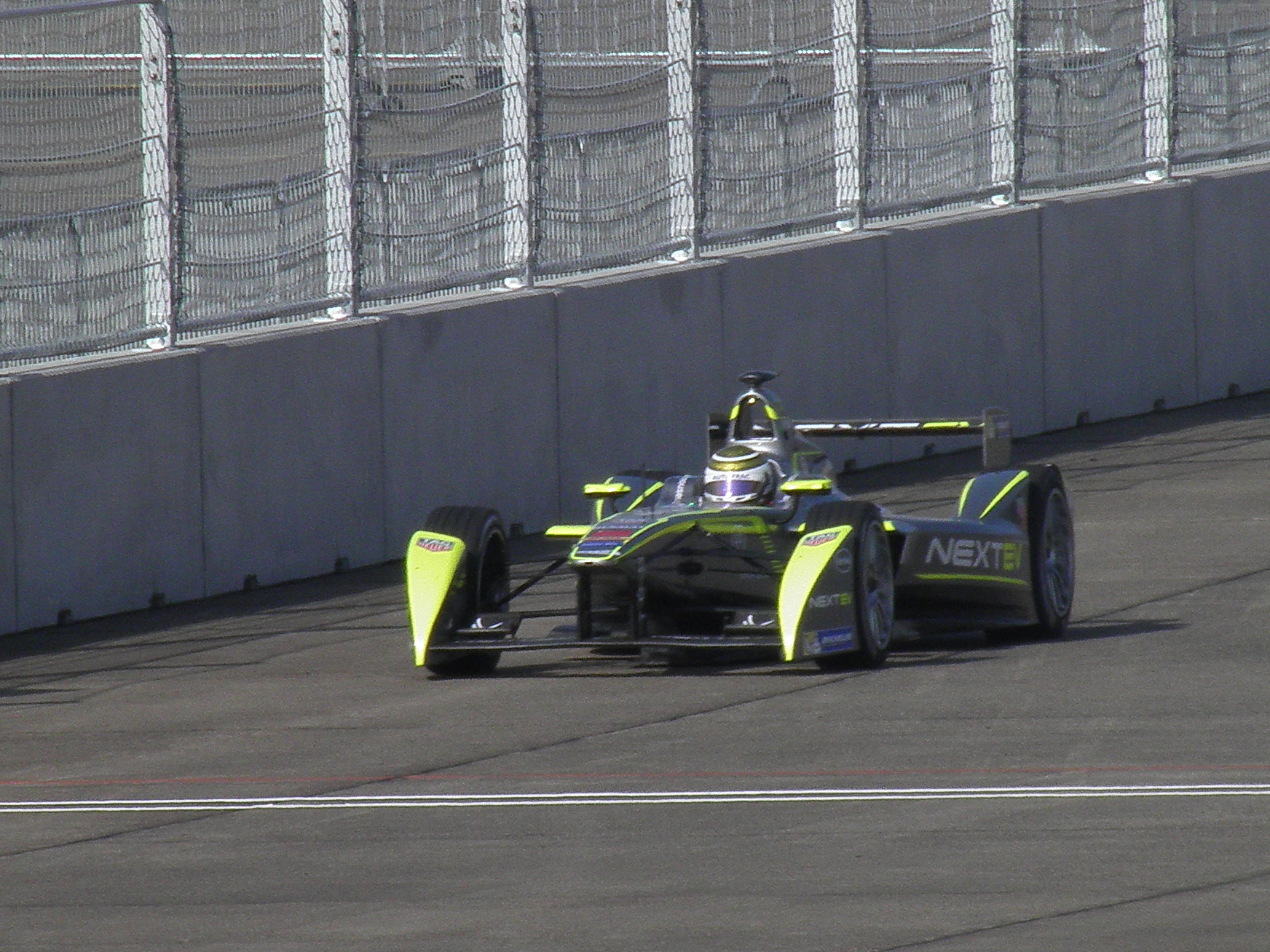
Nelson Piquet Jr. driving the Spark-Renault SRT 01E at 2015 Berlin ePrix

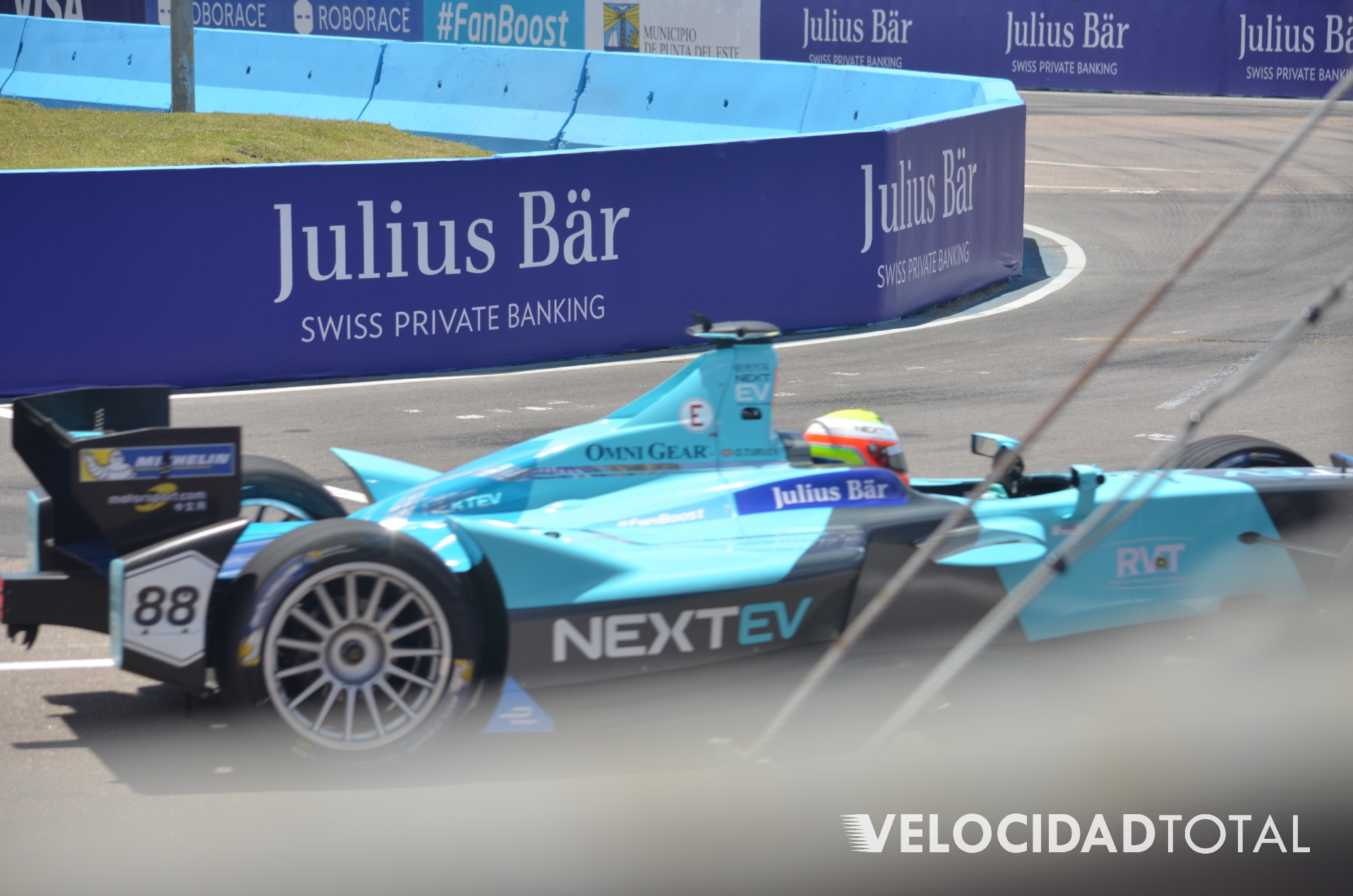
Oliver Turvey driving the Spark-Renault SRT 01E at 2015 Punta del Este ePrix

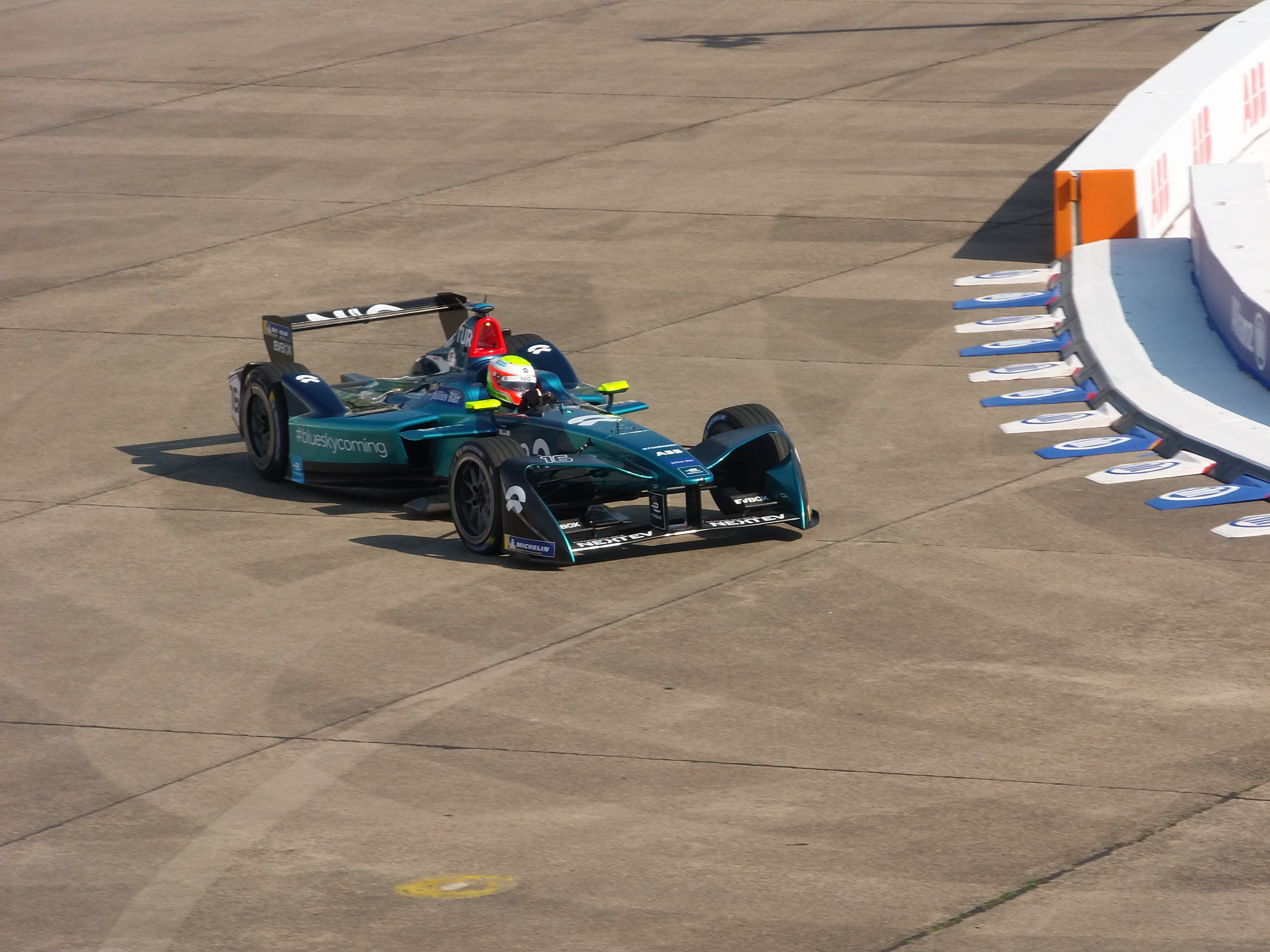
Oliver Turvey driving the Spark-Renault SRT 01E at 2018 Berlin ePrix

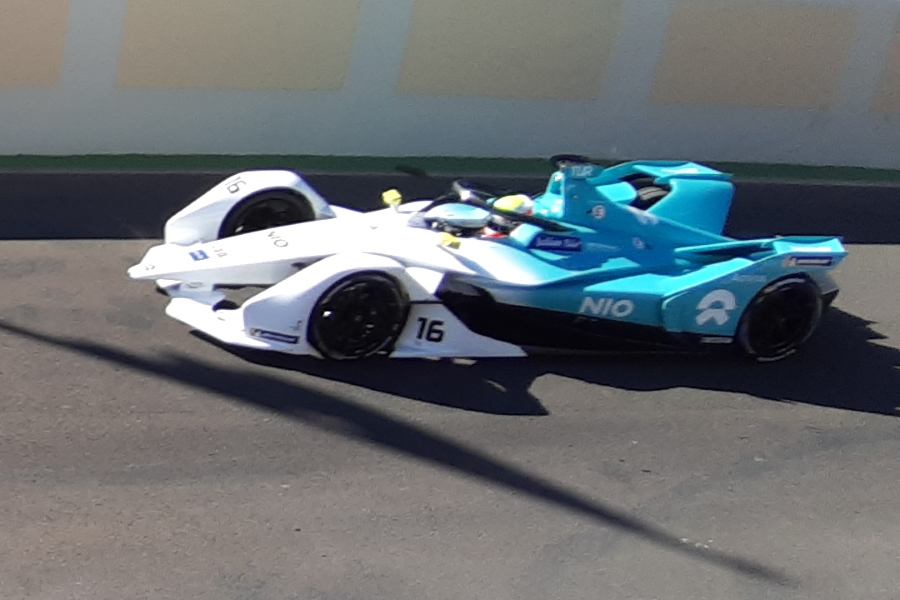
Oliver Turvey driving the Spark SRT05e at 2019 Marrakesh ePrix

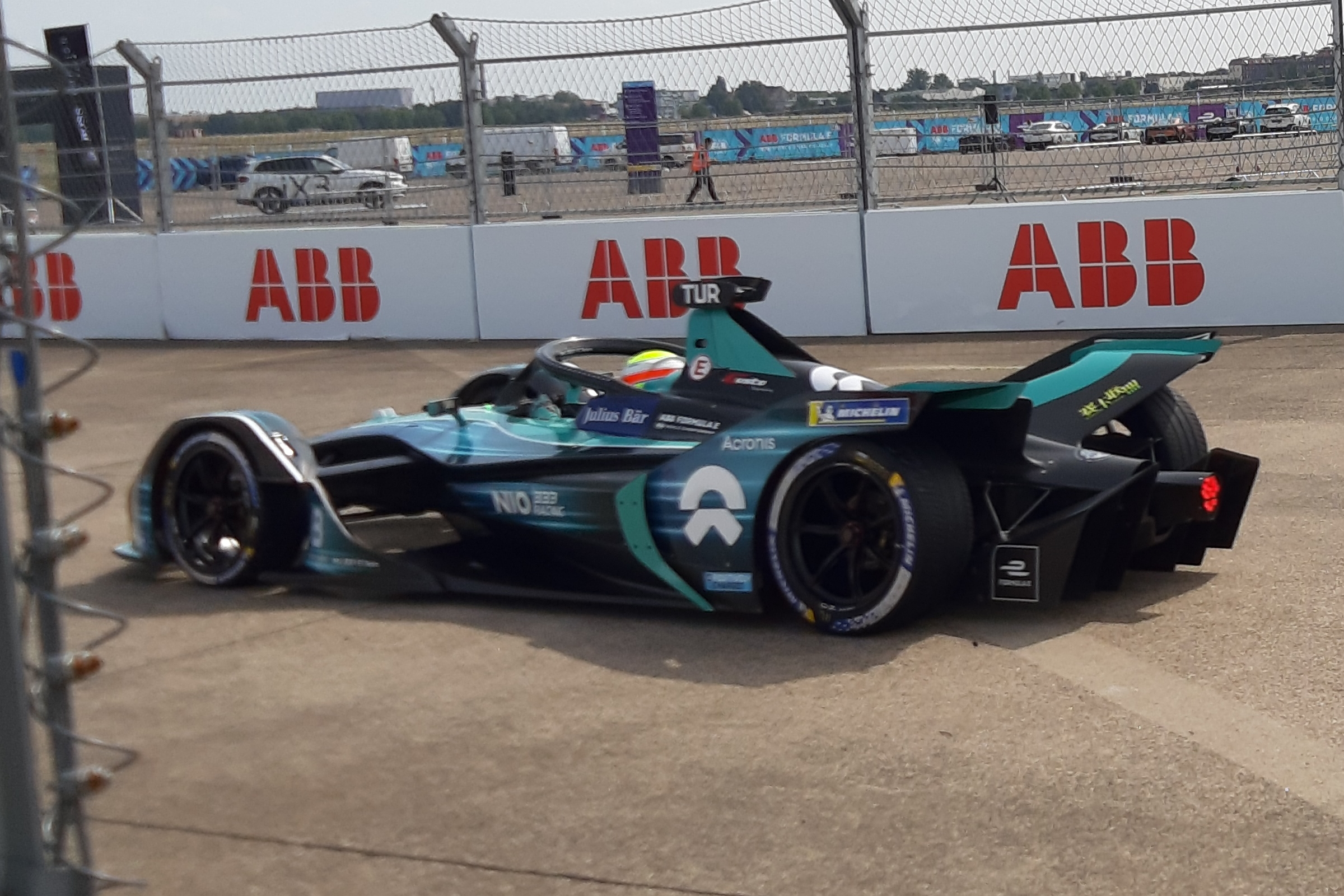
Oliver Turvey driving the Spark SRT05e at 2021 Berlin ePrix

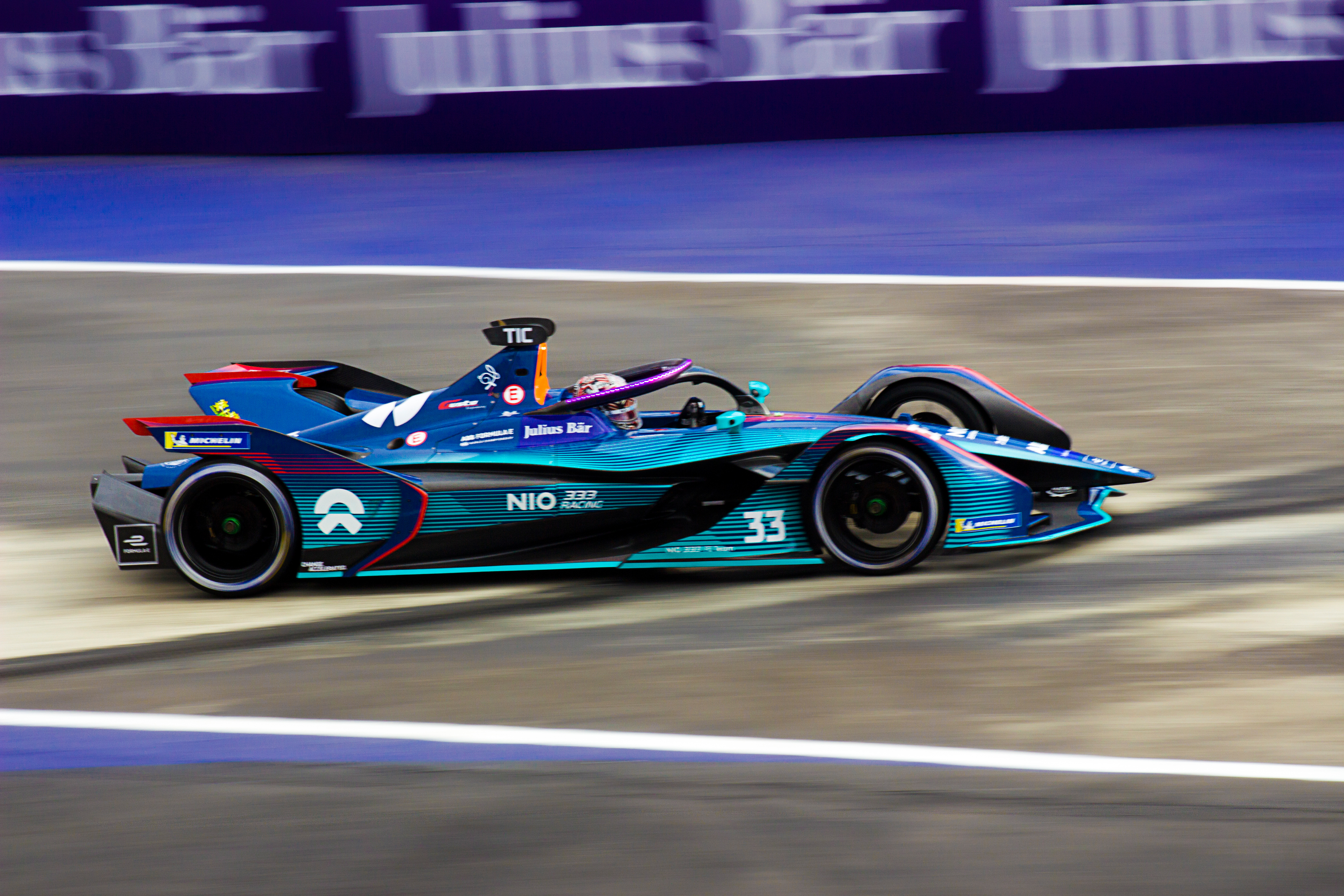
Daniel Ticktum driving the Spark SRT05e at 2022 Mexico City ePrix

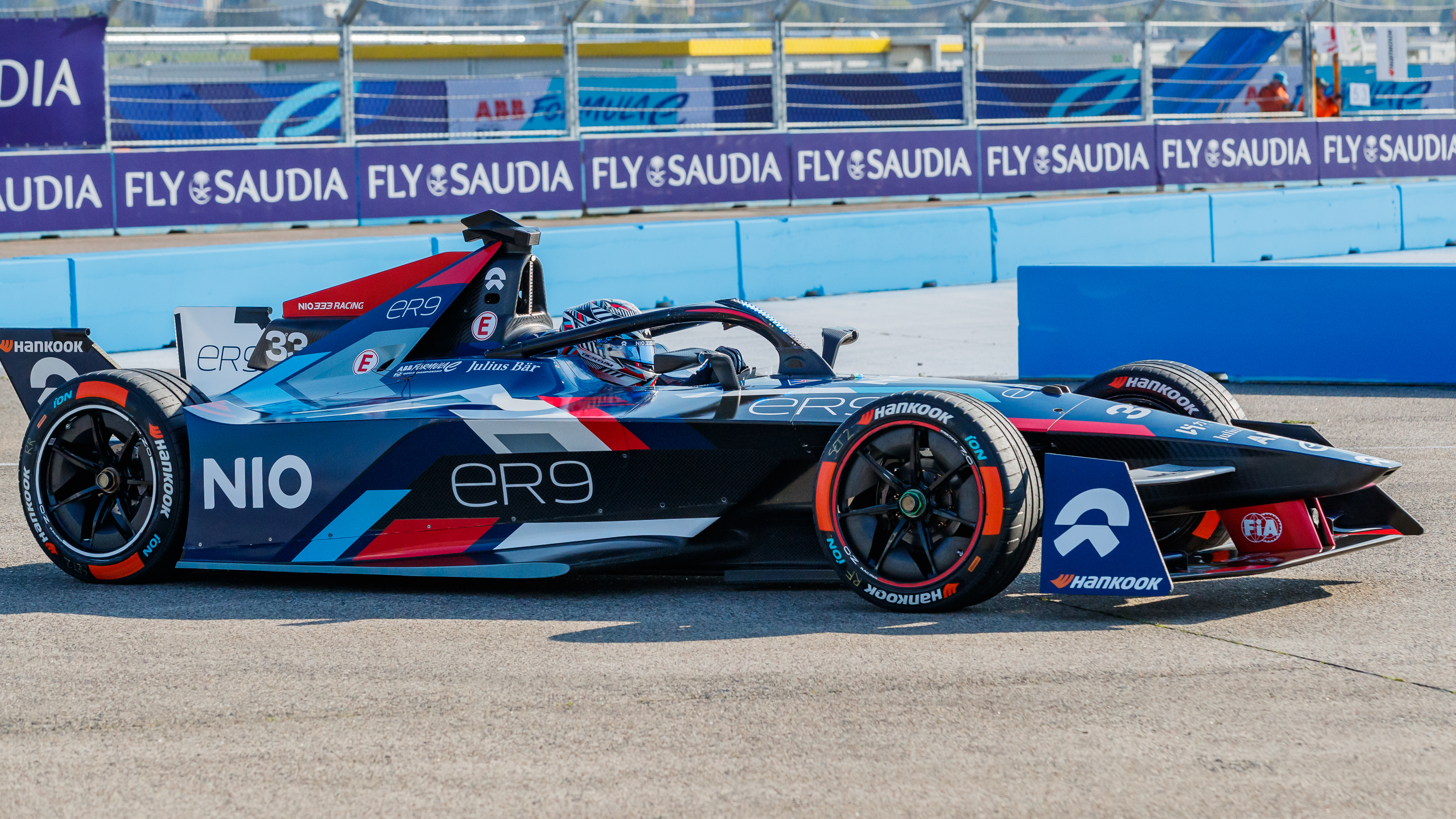
Daniel Ticktum driving the Formula E Gen3 at 2023 Berlin ePrix

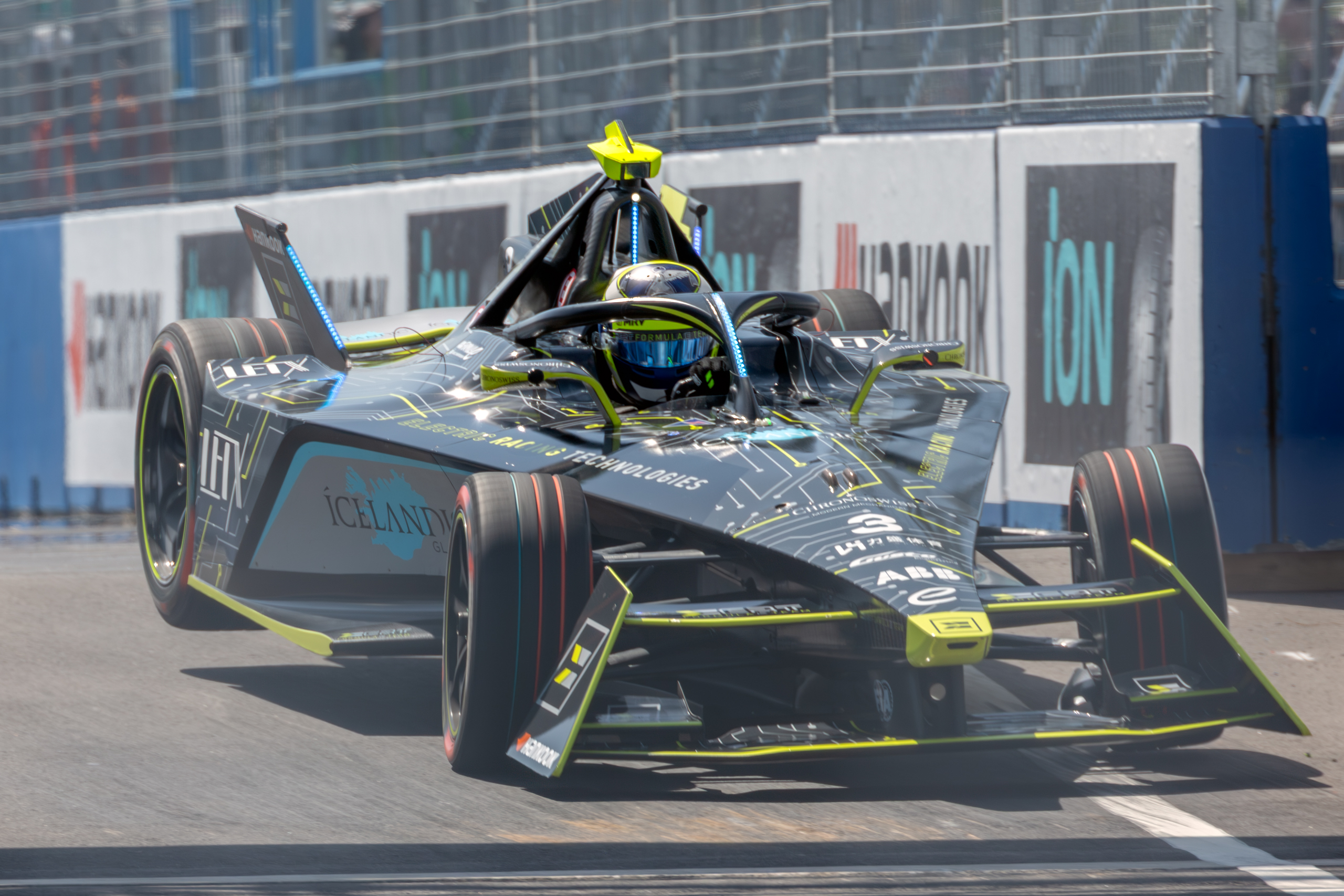
Sérgio Sette Câmara driving the Formula E Gen3 at 2024 Tokyo ePrix

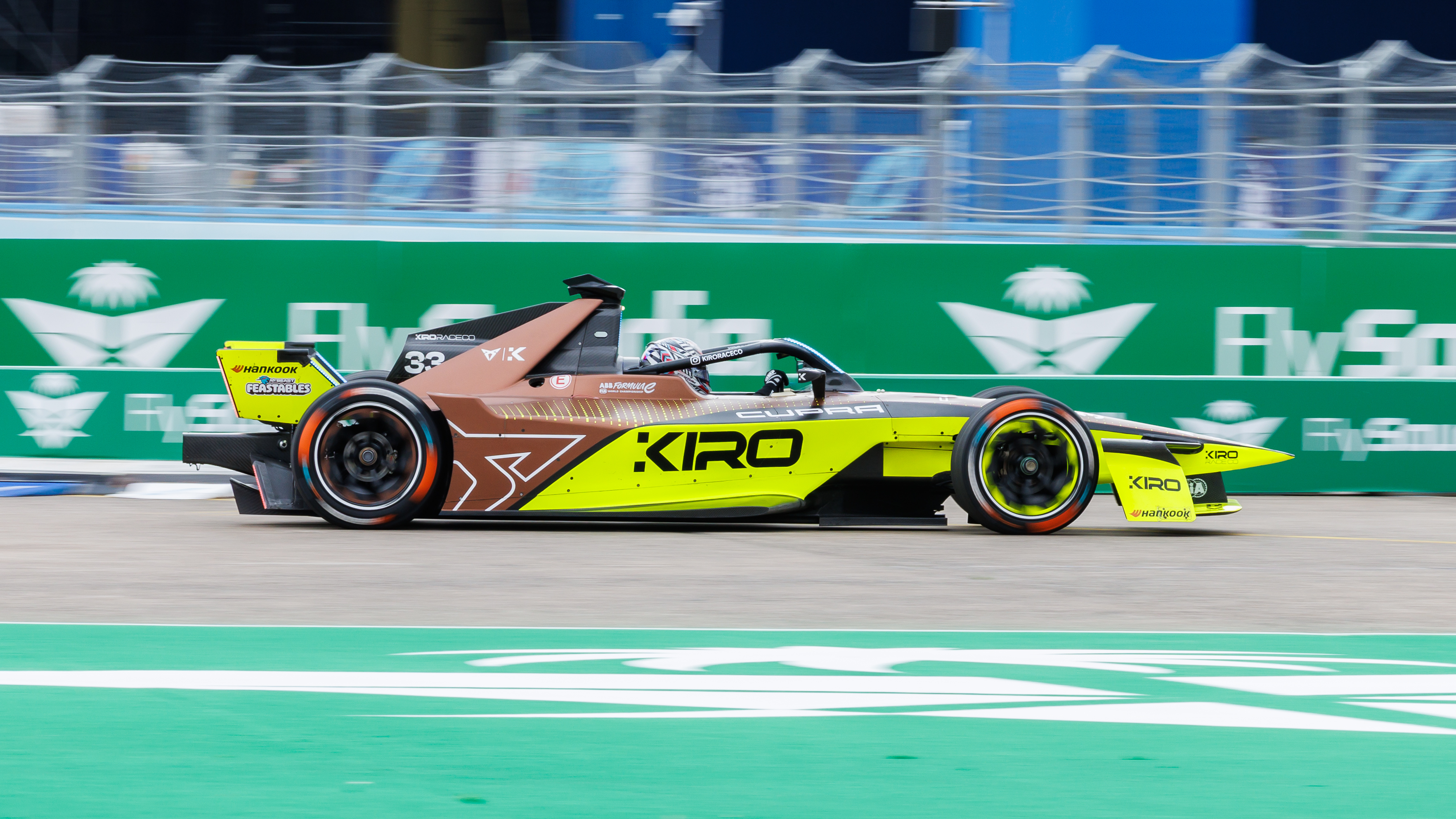
Daniel Ticktum driving the Formula E Gen3 EVO at 2025 Berlin ePrix

== Lola ==
Season	Main colour(s)	Additional colour(s)	Main sponsor(s)	Additional major sponsor(s)	Special liveries
2024–25	Yellow, Blue	Black	Lola, Yamaha	Abt, PACETEQ, Living Things (2025)	The team supported movies Superman at the 2025 Berlin ePrix respectively.
2025–26	Yellow, Blue	Black	Lola, Yamaha	Abt, Aquame, Eurosport, Ituranob, Solgaard, Barbados Tourism	
2026–27	Blue, Yellow	Black	Lola, Yamaha	Takasago	

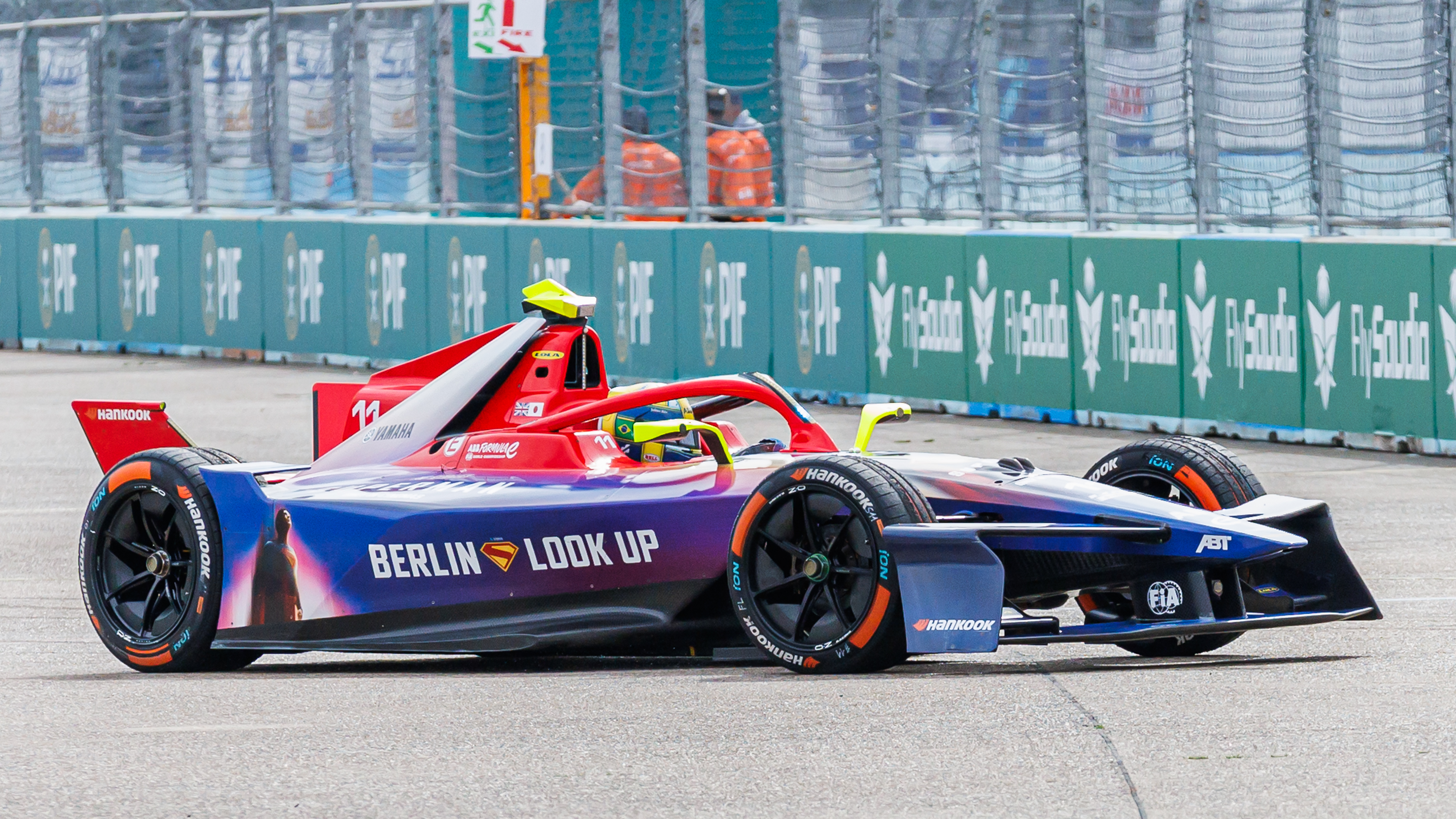
Lucas Di Grassi driving a special Lola livery Formula E Gen3 EVO at the 2025 Berlin ePrix

== Mahindra ==
Season	Main colour(s)	Additional colour(s)	Main sponsor(s)	Additional major sponsor(s)
2014–15	Black, Red	White	Mahindra	Gillette, IHG Rewards Club
2015–16	Black, Red	White	Mahindra	AVIS, IHG Rewards Club, Indian Oil
2016–17	Red	White	Mahindra	Erreà, Indian Oil, Lear, Magneti Marelli
2017–18	Red	Blue, White	Mahindra, Renesas	Erreà, Indian Oil, Lear, Magneti Marelli, Pininfarina, Sparco, Tech Mahindra, Umicore, Voxdale
2018–19	Red, Blue	White	Mahindra, Renesas	ZF, Shell, Lear, Tech Mahindra, Umicore, Voxdale
2019–20	Red, Blue	White	Mahindra, Renesas	ZF, Shell, Banbutsu, Nippon, Tech Mahindra, Umicore, Voxdale
2020–21	Red, Blue	White	Mahindra	ZF, Shell, IQONIQ, Nippon, Tech Mahindra, Voxdale
2021–22	Red	White	Mahindra	ZF, Shell, ILJIAR, Maurice Lacroix, Nippon, Rockfort Engineering, Tech Mahindra
2022–23	Red, Bronze	Blue, Black	Mahindra	ZF, Shell, Coral, EY, Maurice Lacroix, Nippon, OMP, One8, Rockfort Engineering, SYGXIA, Tech Mahindra
2023–24	Red, Silver	Black	Mahindra	Nippon, Rockfort Engineering, Shell, Tech Mahindra, Castore
2024–25	Black, Red	White	Mahindra	Tech Mahindra, Shell, Nippon
2025–26	Black, Red	White	Mahindra	Tech Mahindra, Valvoline, Nippon
2026–27	Black, Red	White	Mahindra	Tech Mahindra, Valvoline, Valeo, Mahindra Advanced Design Europe, Nippon

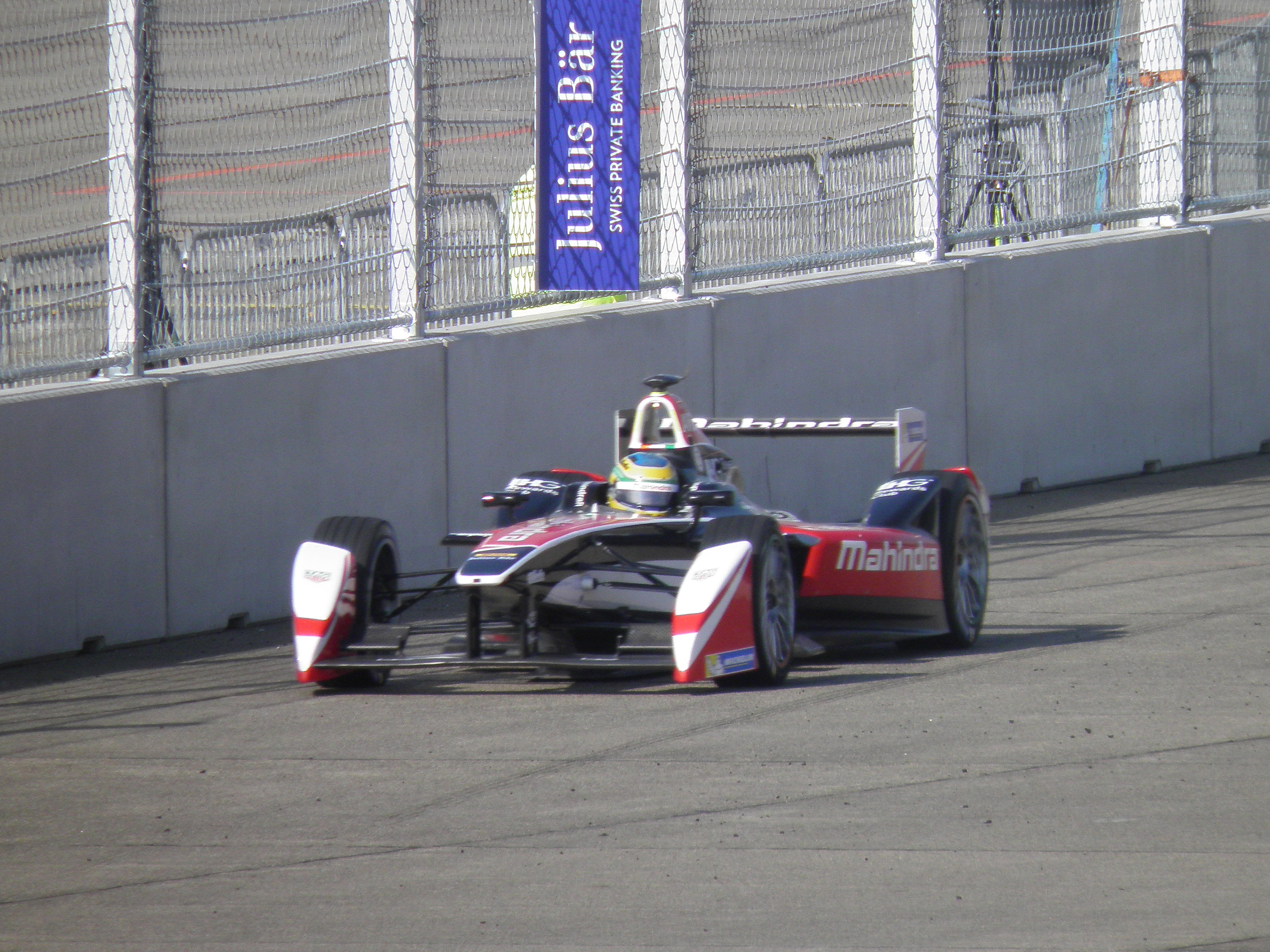
Bruno Senna driving the Spark-Renault SRT 01E at 2015 Berlin ePrix

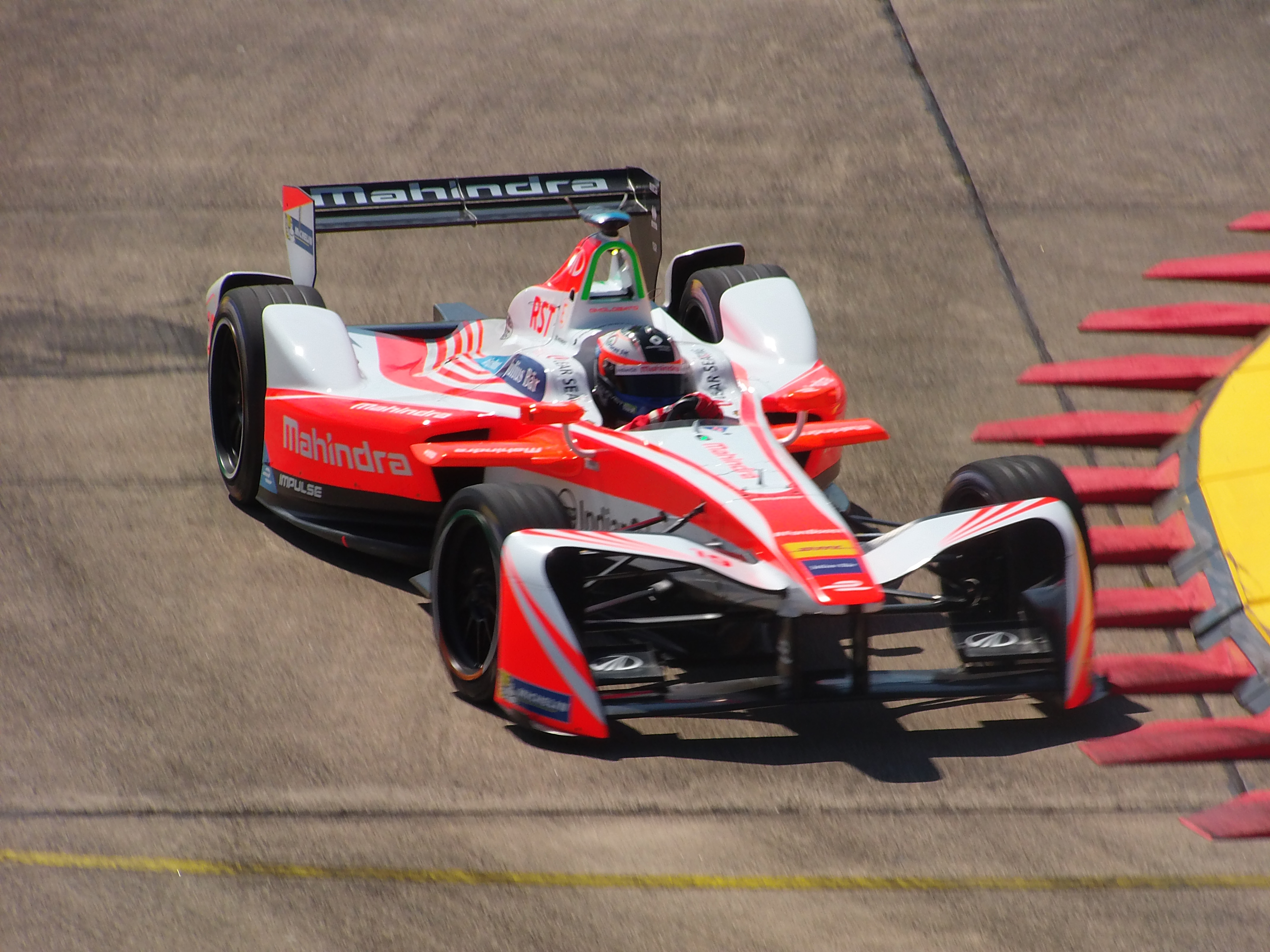
Felix Rosenqvist driving the Spark-Renault SRT 01E at 2017 Berlin ePrix

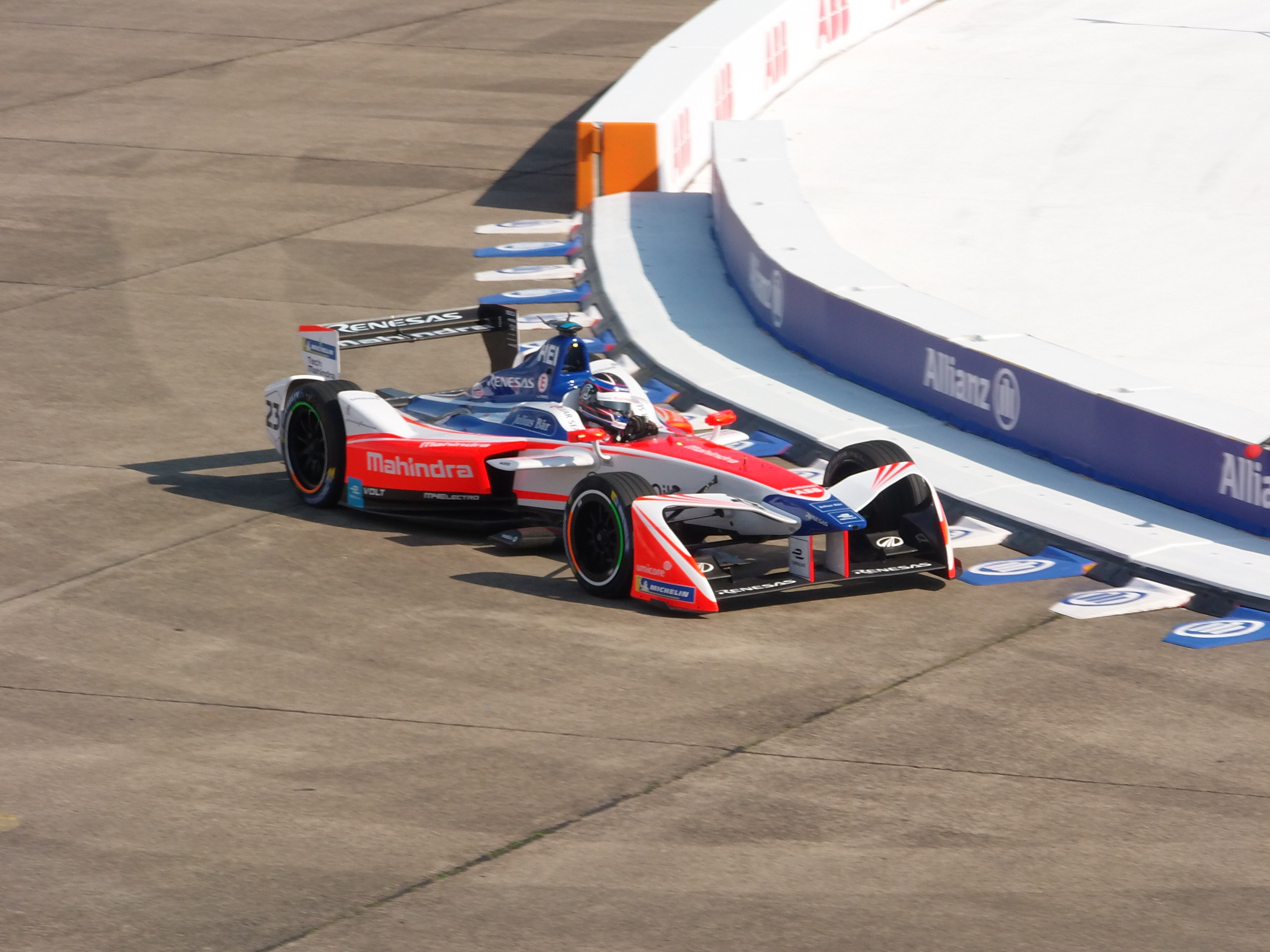
Nick Heidfeld driving the Spark-Renault SRT 01E at 2018 Berlin ePrix

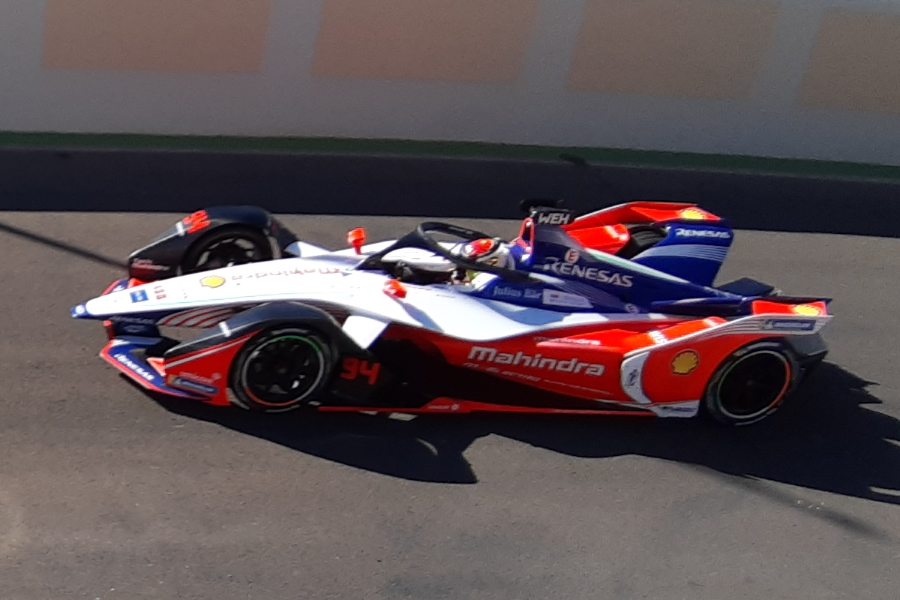
Pascal Wehrlein driving the Spark SRT05e at 2019 Marrakesh ePrix

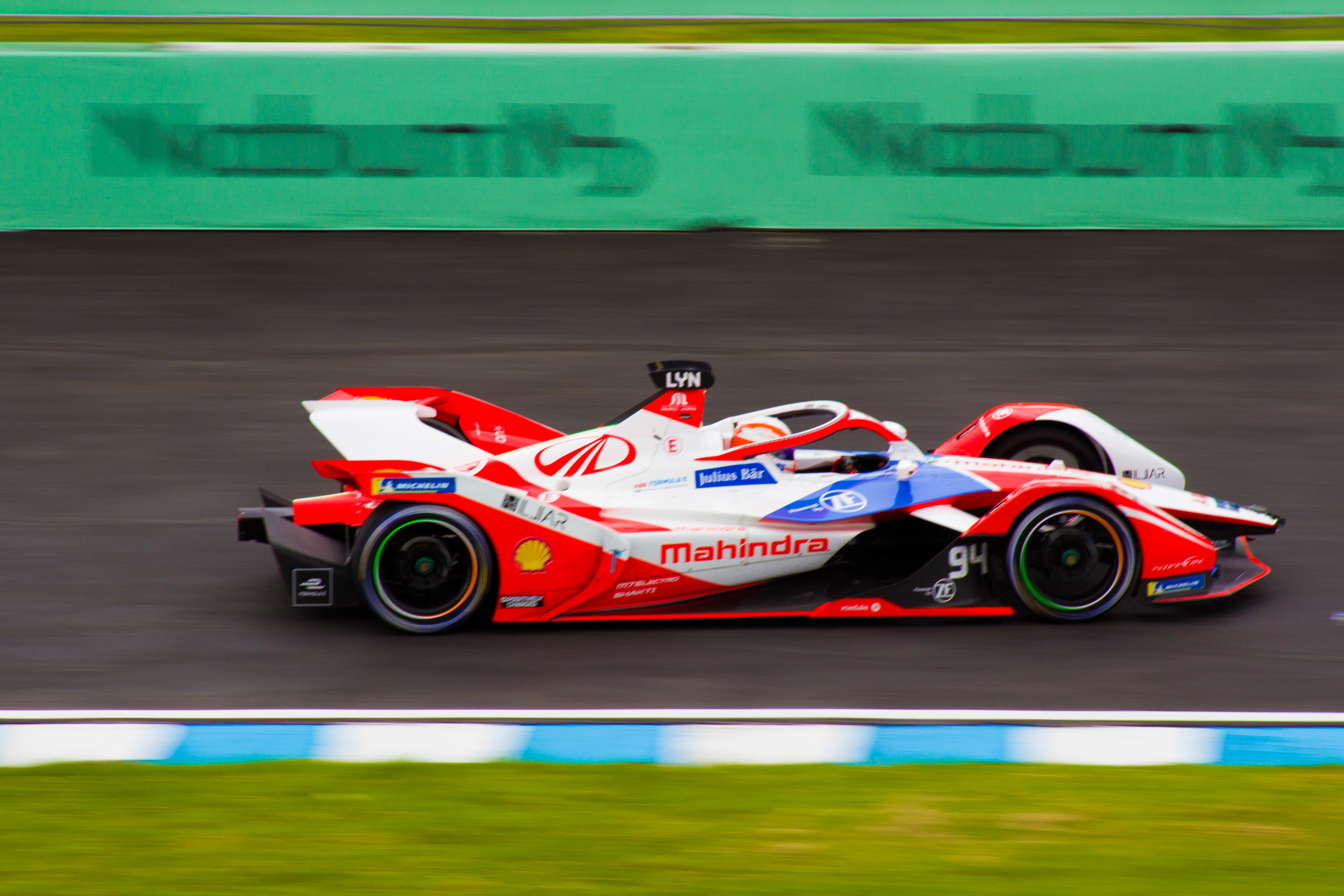
Alex Lynn driving the Spark SRT05e at 2021 Puebla ePrix

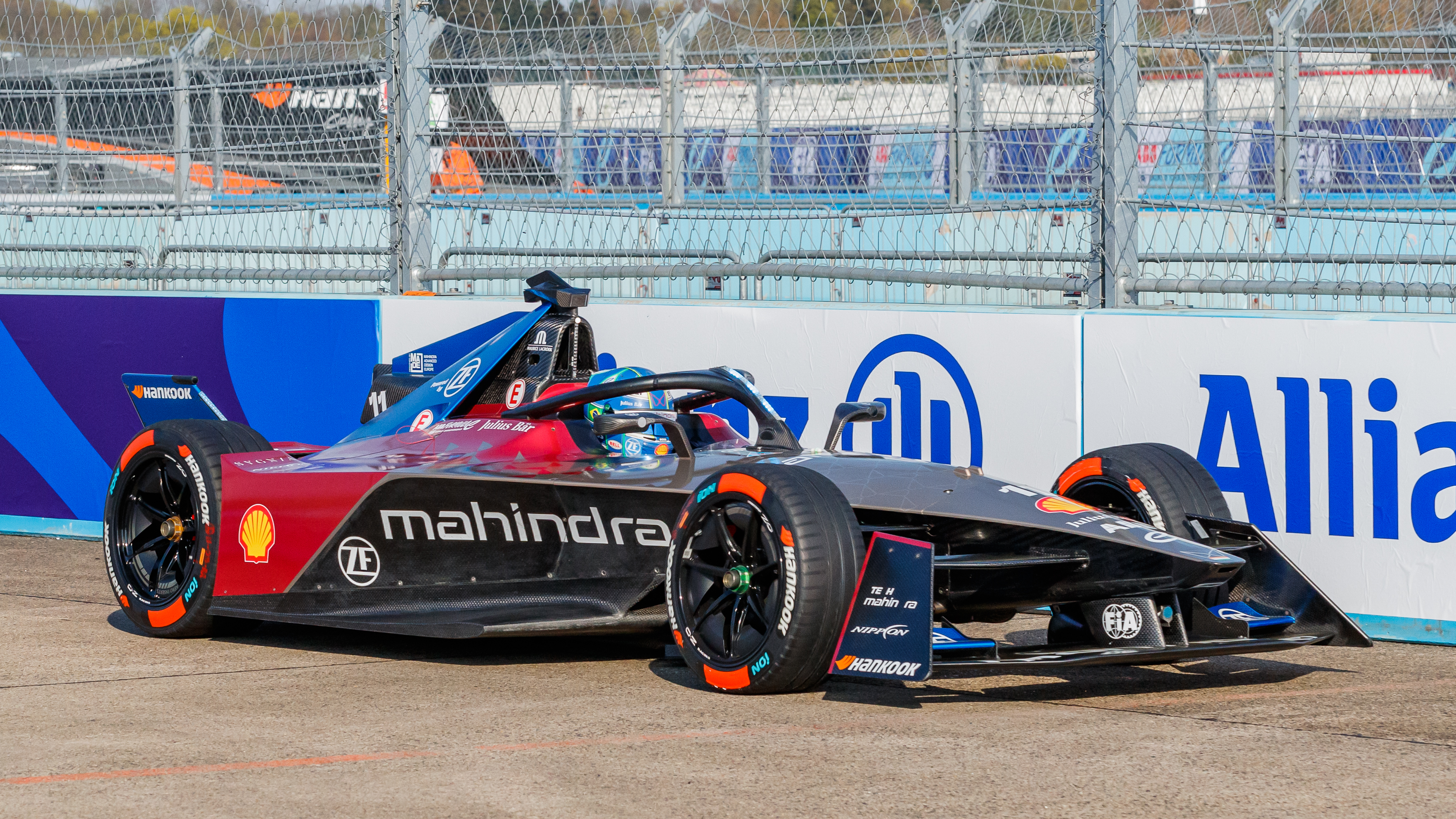
Lucas Di Grassi driving the Formula E Gen3 at 2023 Berlin ePrix

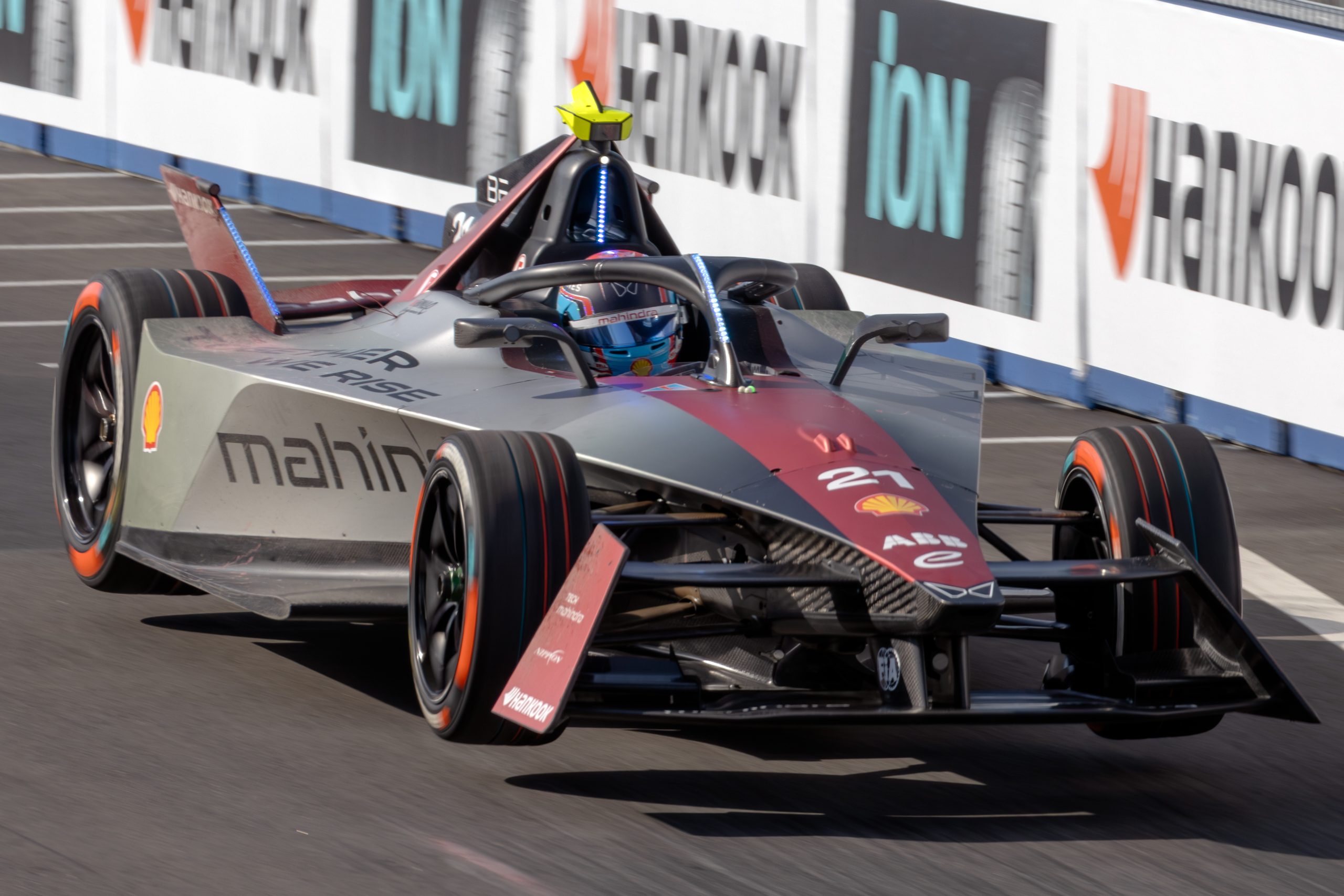
Nyck de Vries driving the Formula E Gen3 at 2024 Tokyo ePrix

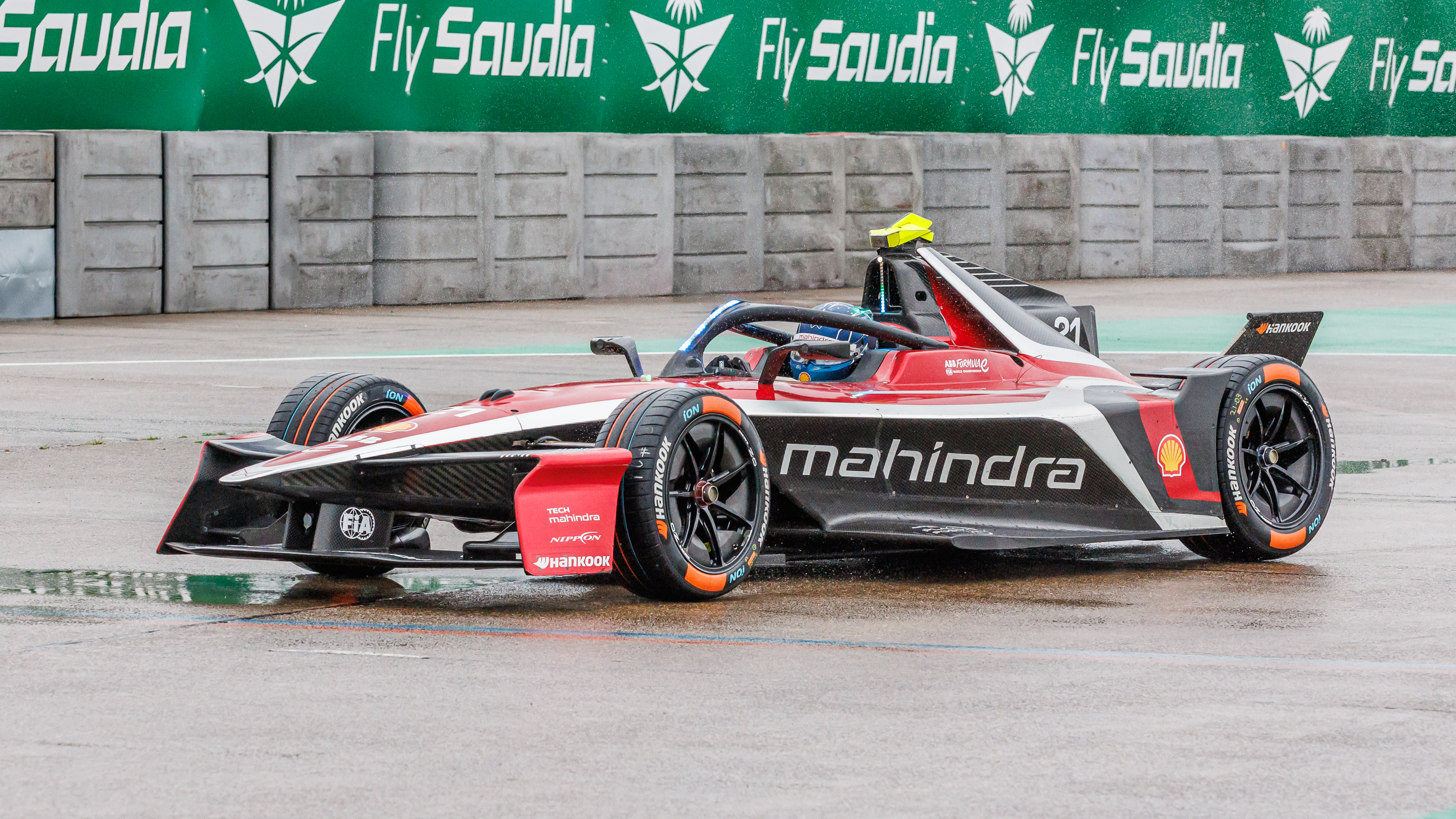
Felipe Drugovich driving the Formula E Gen3 EVO at 2025 Berlin ePrix

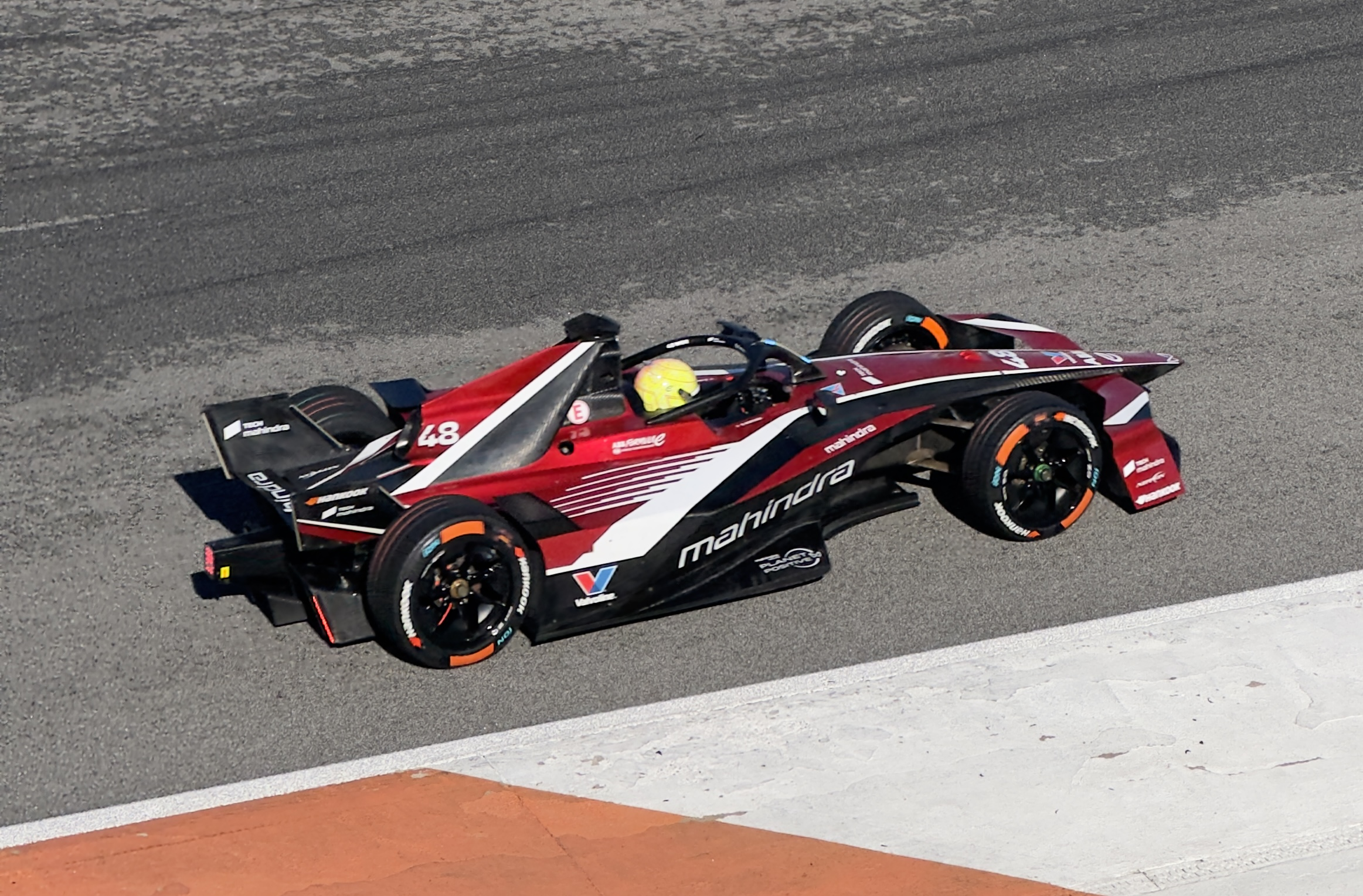
Edoardo Mortara driving the Formula E Gen3 EVO at 2025 the Pre-test season in Valencia

== McLaren ==
Season	Main colour(s)	Additional colour(s)	Main sponsor(s)	Additional major sponsor(s)	Special liveries
2022–23	Black, Orange	Blue	Neom		
2023–24	Black, Orange		Neom	Trend Micro, Vuse, Udemy	At the London ePrix, McLaren used motorsport's first AI-generated livery to commemorate company's 60th anniversary.
2024–25	Black, Orange		Neom	Trend Micro, Velo, Udemy, TDK	A special Oxagon livery was raced at the London ePrix.

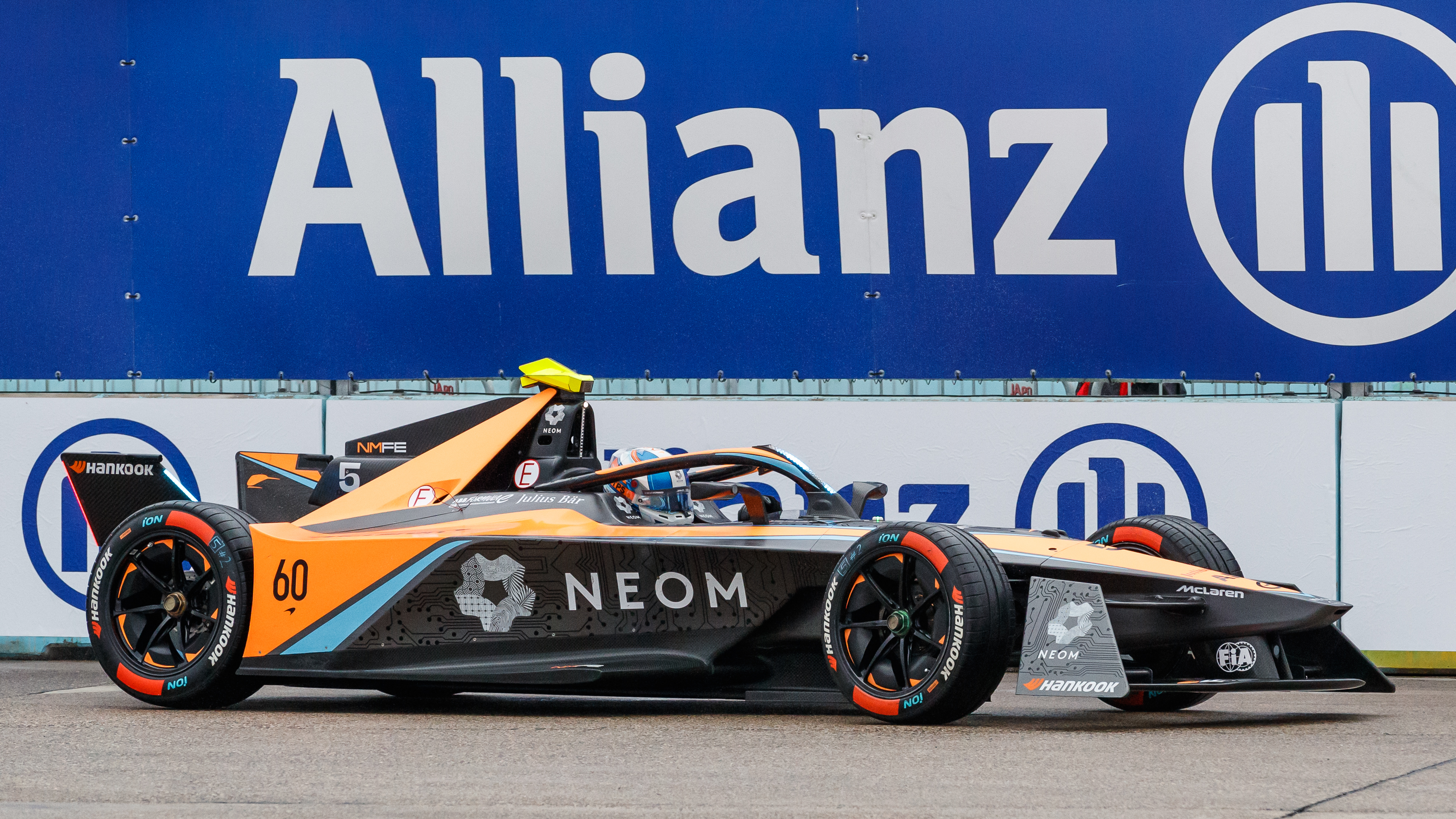
Jack Hughes driving the Formula E Gen3 at 2023 Berlin ePrix

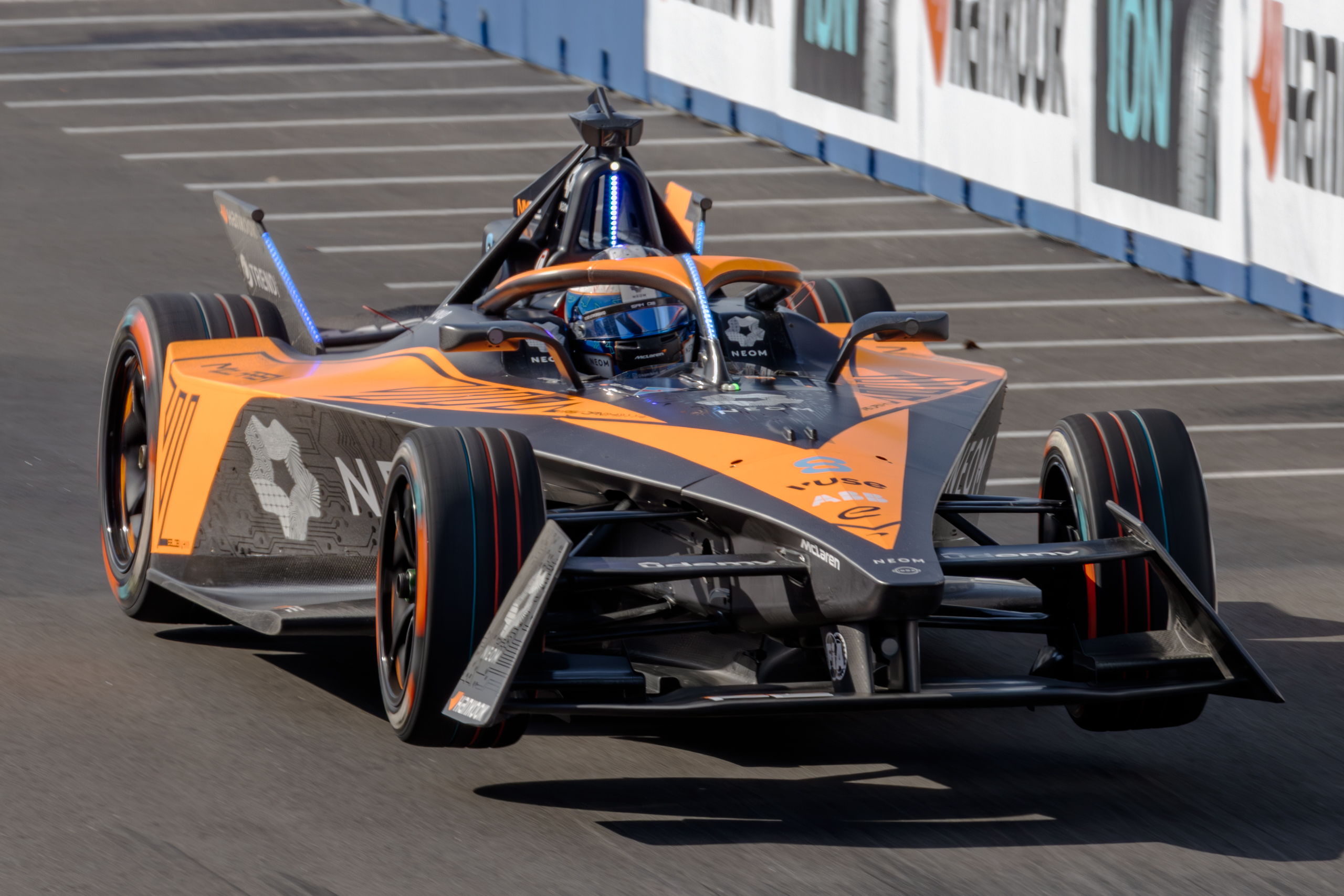
Sam Bird driving the Formula E Gen3 at 2024 Tokyo ePrix

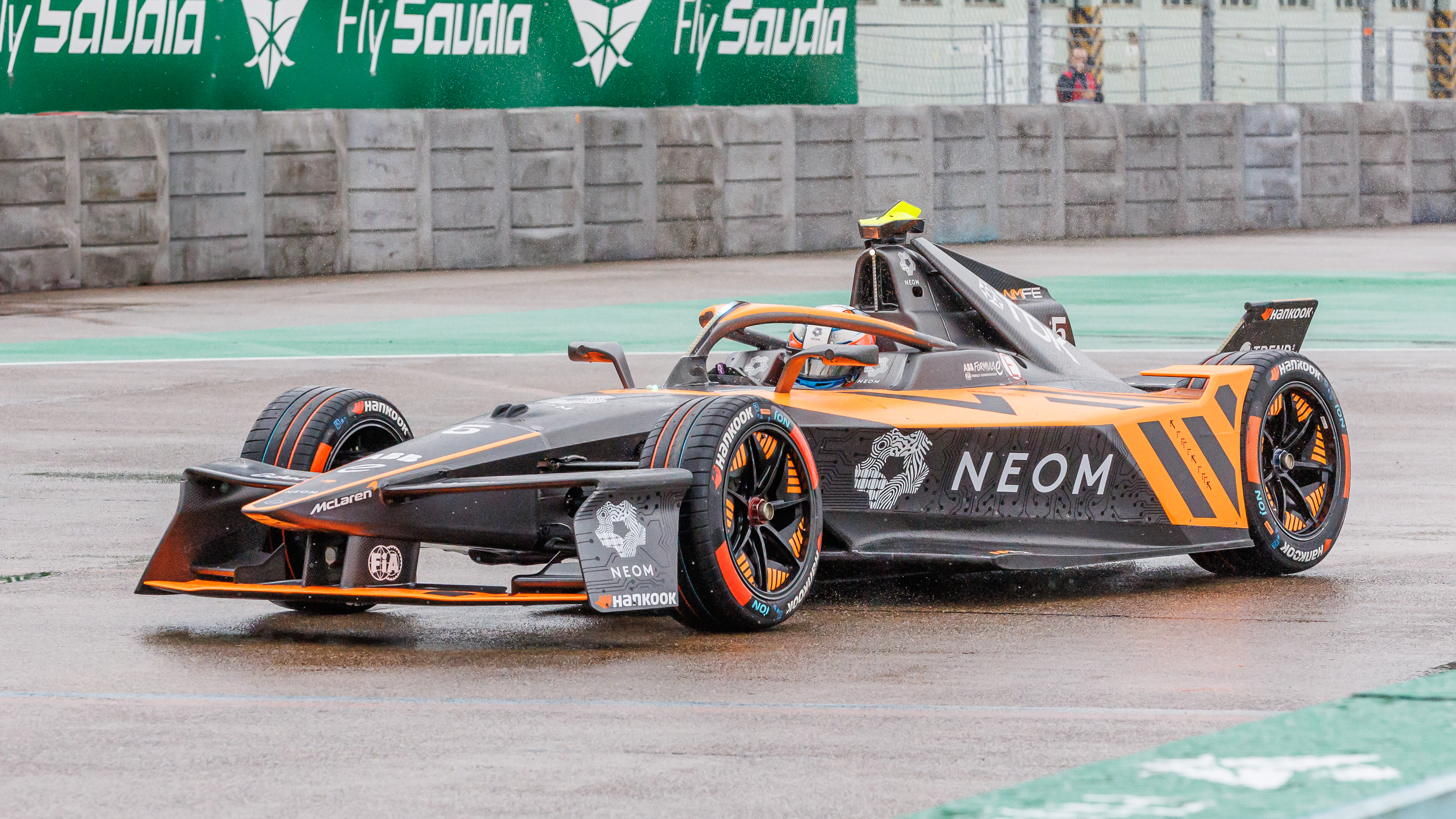
Taylor Barnard driving the Formula E Gen3 EVO at 2025 Berlin ePrix

== Mercedes-Benz ==
Season	Main colour(s)	Additional colour(s)	Main sponsor(s)	Additional major sponsor(s)
2019–20	Silver	Blue, Black	Vestas, Mercedes-EQ	SAP, ON, Neom
2020–21	Silver	Blue, Black	Vestas, Mercedes-EQ	SAP, ON, Neom, Modis
2021–22	Silver	Blue, Black	Vestas, Mercedes-EQ	SAP, Neom, Akkodis, TeamViewer, Kroll

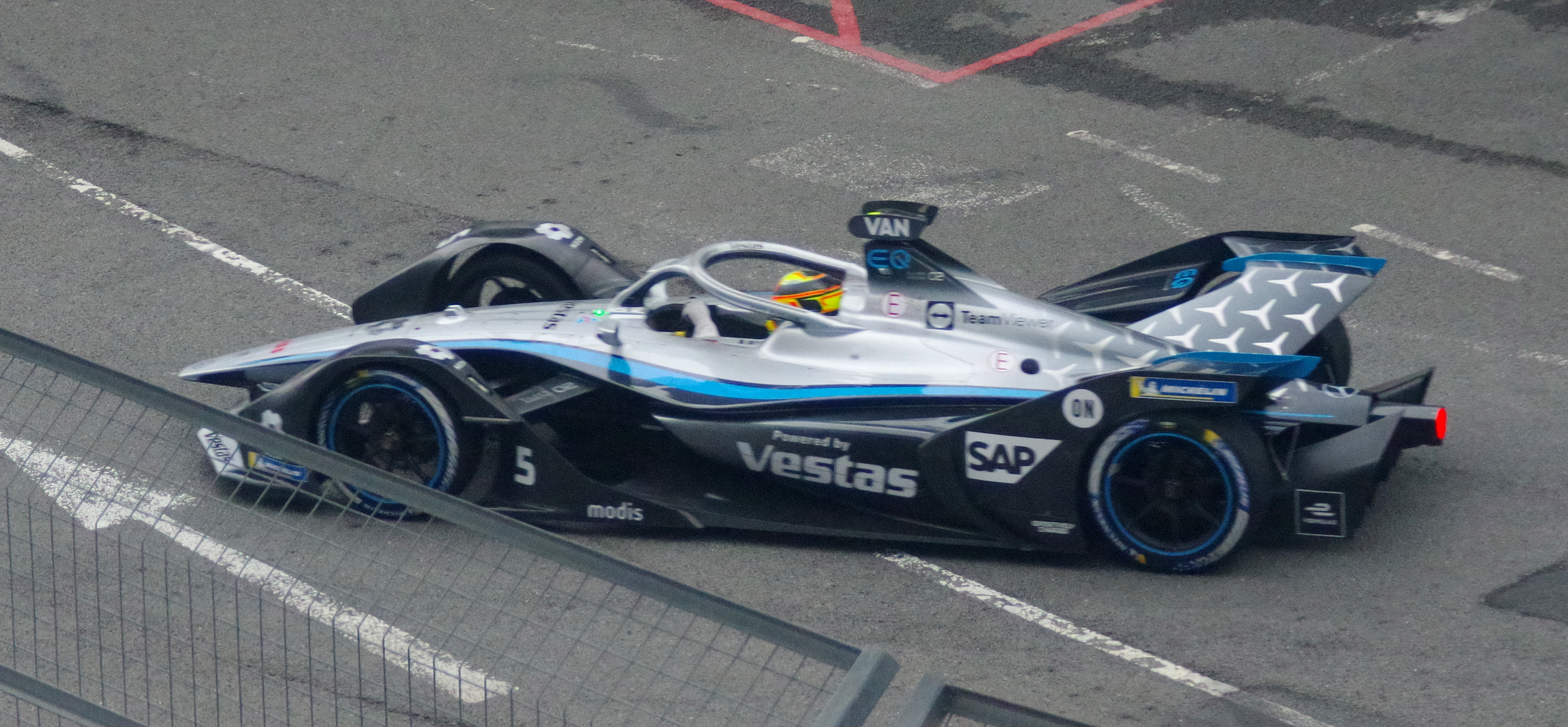
Stoffel Vandoorne driving the Spark SRT05e at 2021 London ePrix

== MSG ==
Season	Main colour(s)	Additional colour(s)	Main sponsor(s)	Additional major sponsor(s)
2022–23	Blue, Black	White	Maserati	Craft 1861, Hewlett Packard Enterprise, Lukka Data, ROKiT, Stoli
2023–24	Blue, Bronze	White	Maserati	Hewlett Packard Enterprise, Lukka Data, Petronas, ROKiT, VT Markets
2024–25	Blue, Bronze	White	Maserati	Petronas, EVO, Bianchet, VT Markets

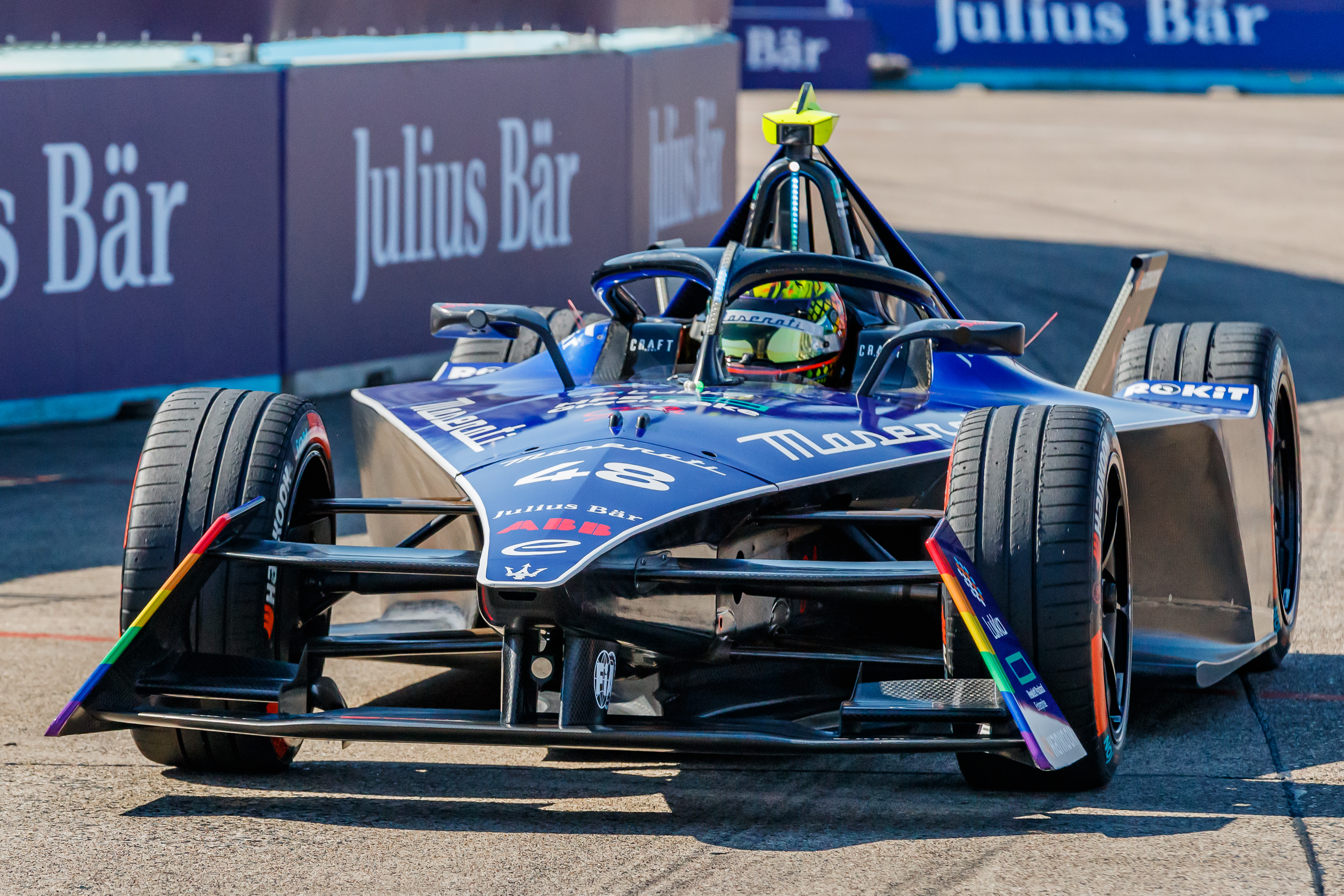
Edoardo Mortara driving the Formula E Gen3 at 2023 Berlin ePrix

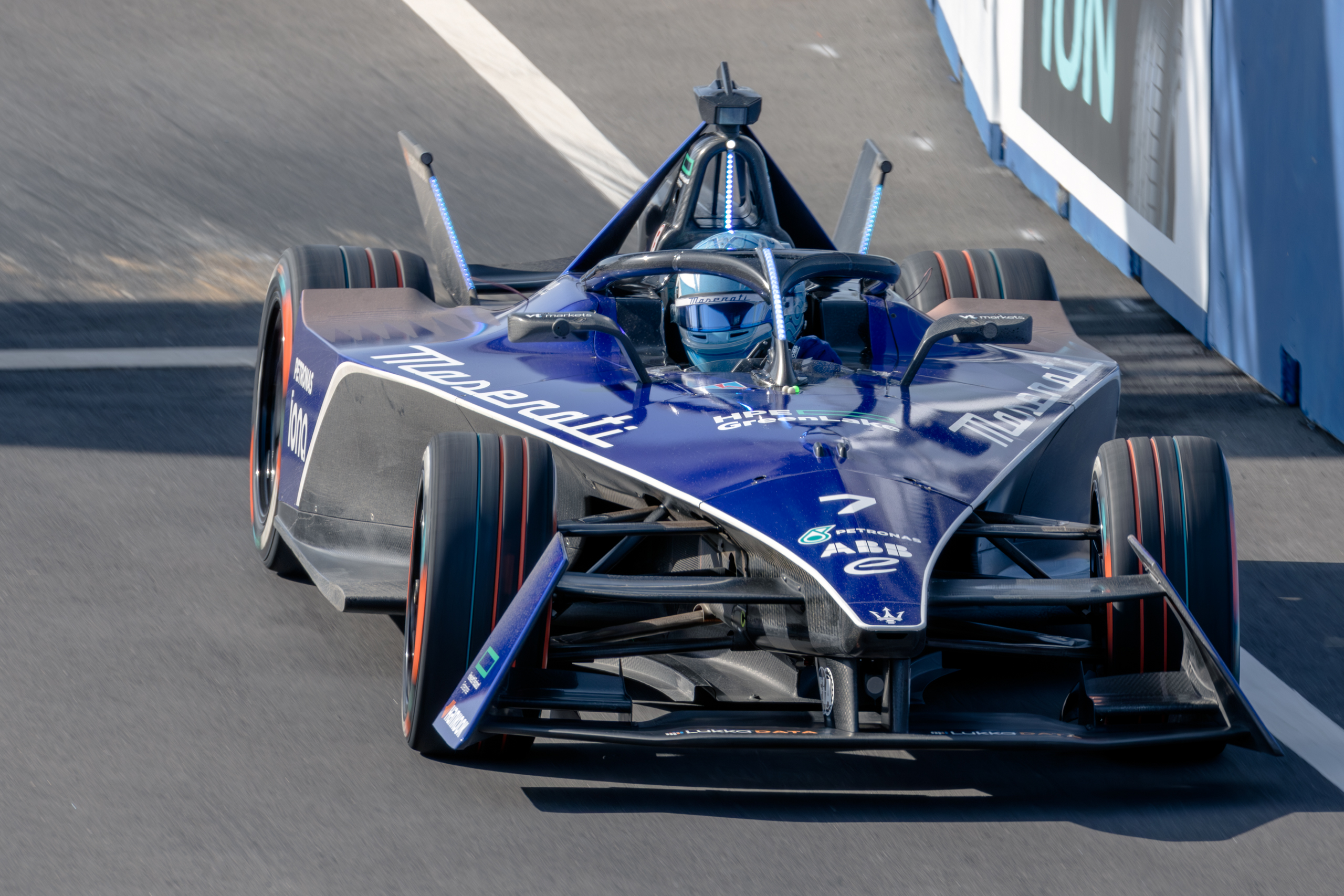
Maximilian Günther driving the Formula E Gen3 at 2024 Tokyo ePrix

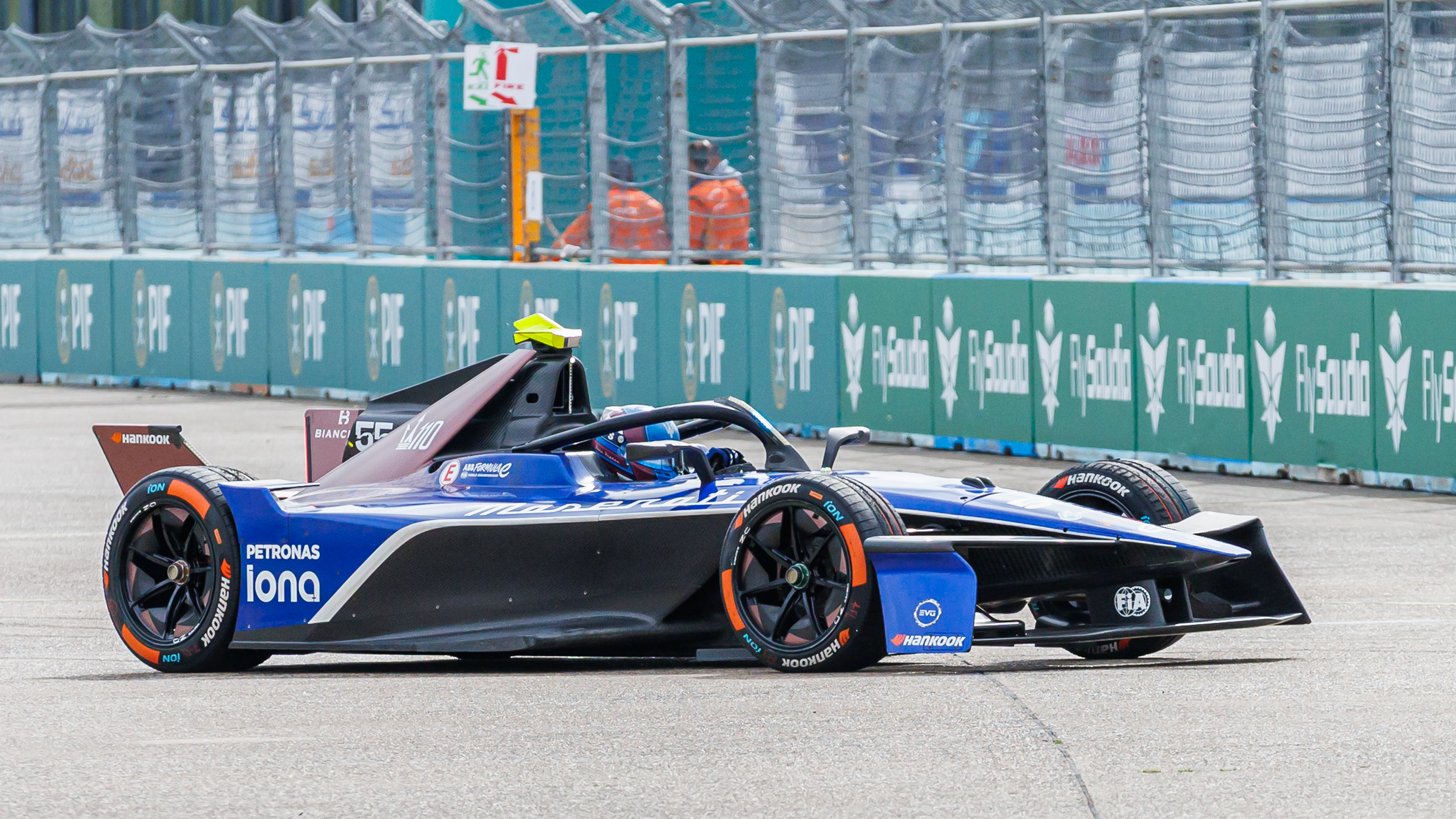
Jake Hughes driving the Formula E Gen3 EVO at 2025 Berlin ePrix

== Nissan ==
Season	Main colour(s)	Additional colour(s)	Main sponsor(s)	Additional major sponsor(s)	Special liveries
2022–23	White, Red		Nissan	Nismo, Shell, The Woolmark Company	
2023–24	White, Red		Nissan	Nismo, Shell, Coral	At 2024 Tokyo ePrix Nissan used white livery.
2024–25	White, Red		Nissan	Nissan LEAF (2025), Nismo, Electromin, Shell EV-Plus (2025), Marelli, Coral	At 2025 London ePrix Nissan used blue livery.
2025–26	White, Red		Nissan	Nissan LEAF (2026), Nismo, Electromin, Marelli, Coral, Dynisma, Shell EV-Plus, Alpine	

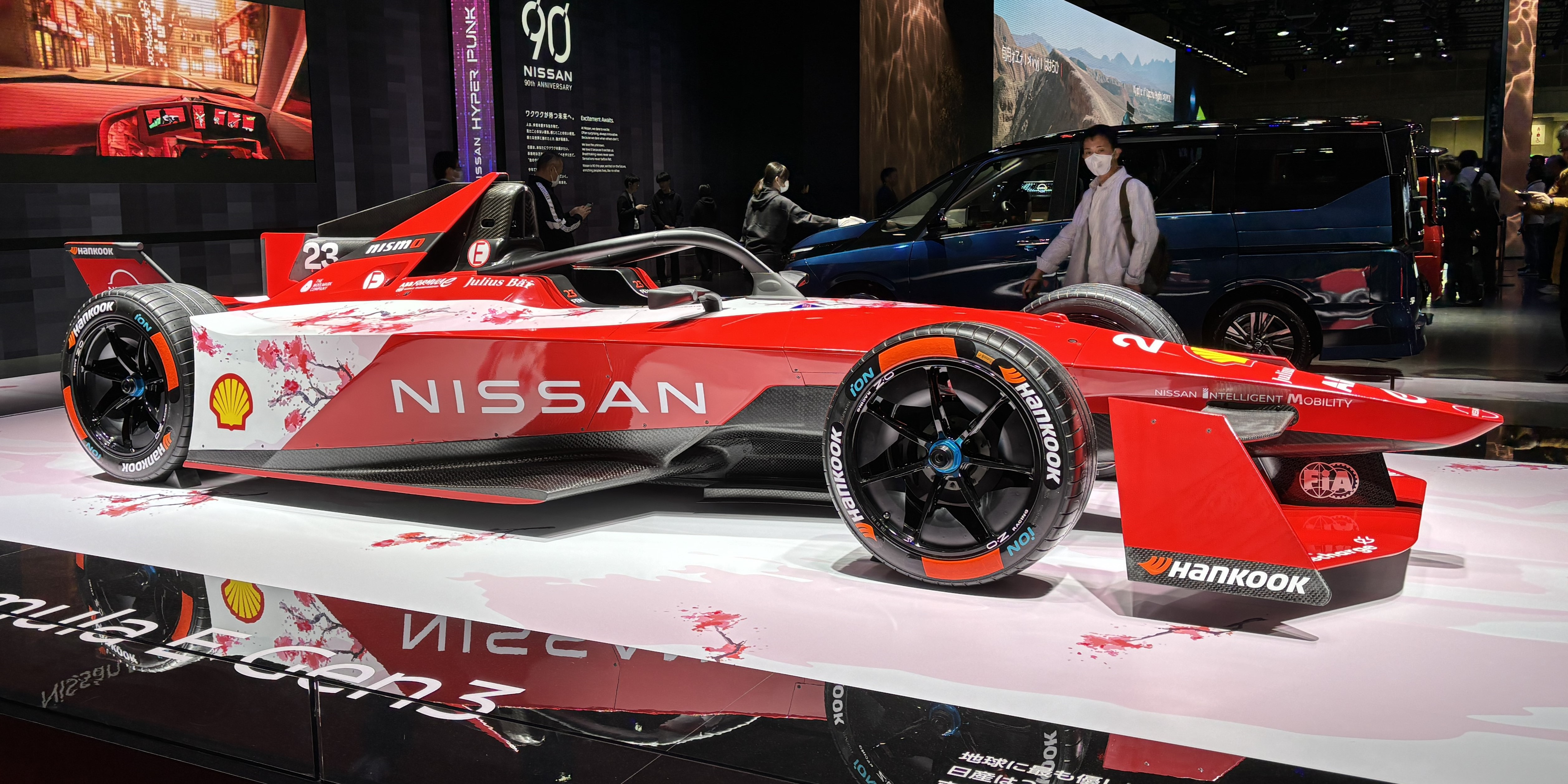
Nissan car at 2023 Japan Mobility Show

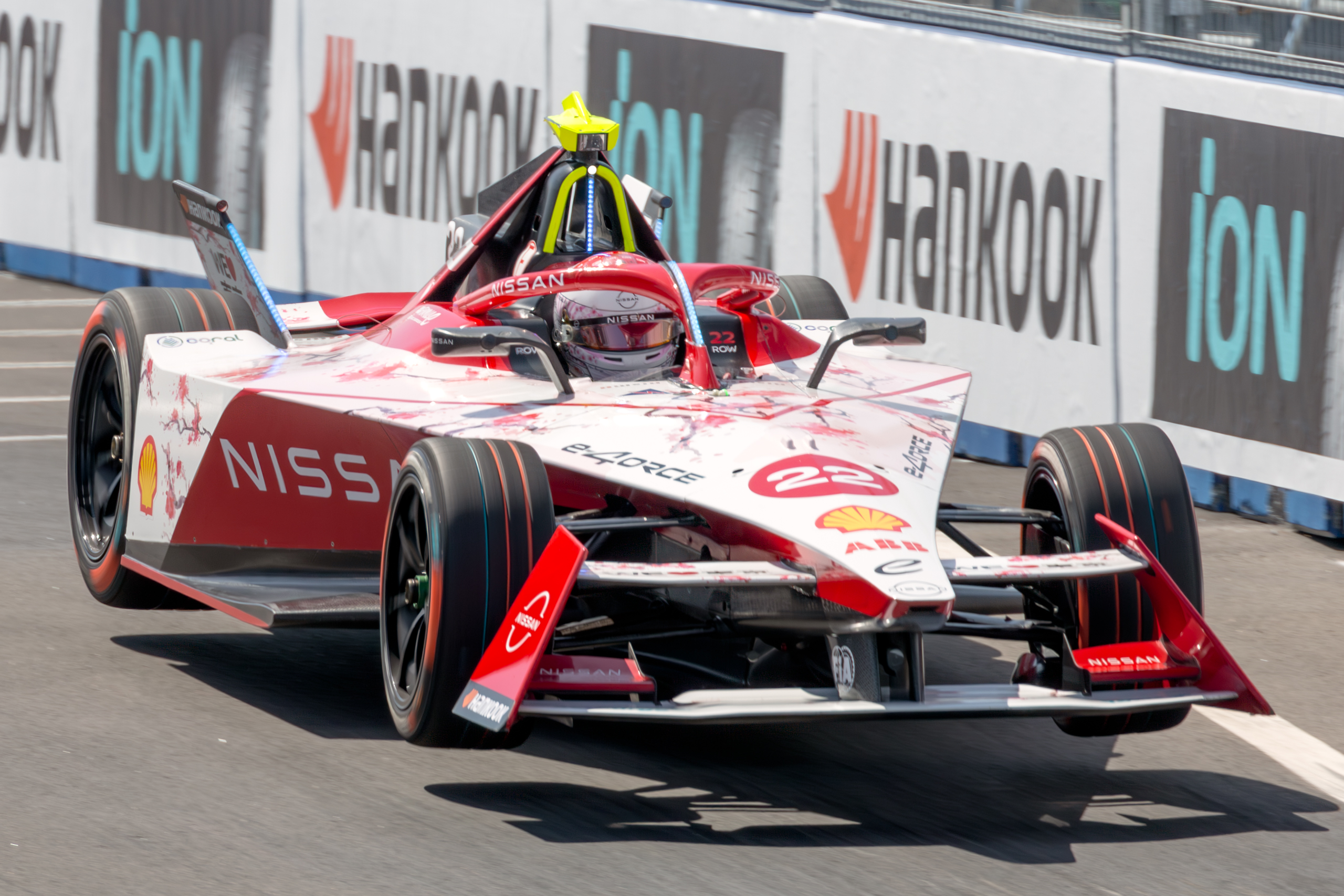
Oliver Rowland driving the Formula E Gen3 at 2024 Tokyo ePrix

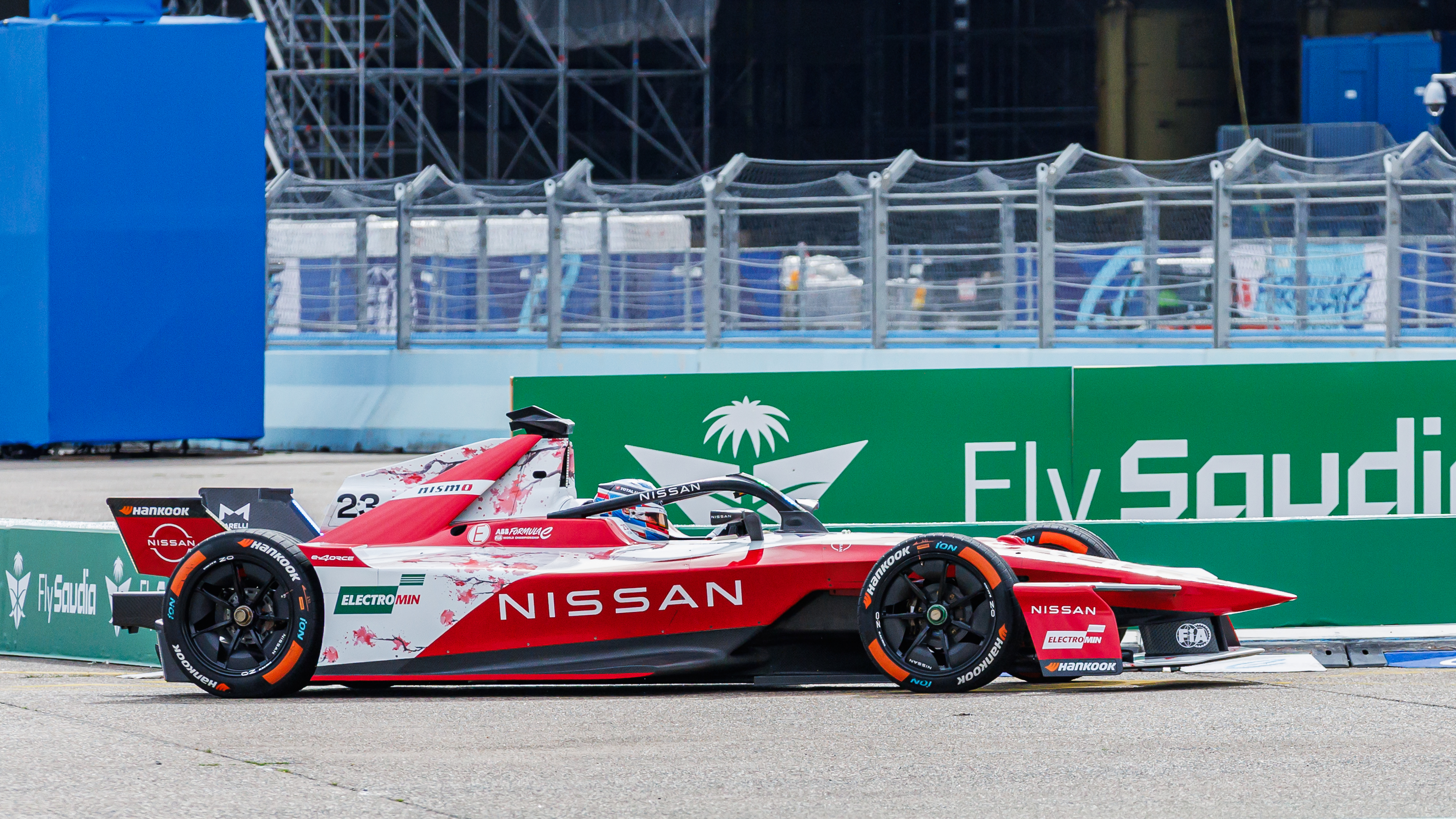
Oliver Rowland driving the Formula E Gen3 EVO at 2025 Berlin ePrix

== Opel ==
Season	Main colour(s)	Additional colour(s)	Main sponsor(s)	Additional major sponsor(s)
2026–27	Yellow, Silver	Black	Opel	

== Penske ==
Season	Main colour(s)	Additional colour(s)	Main sponsor(s)	Additional major sponsor(s)
2014–15	Black, Silver	Red		McAfee, PMC, Variety
2015–16	Red	Black		BGR, Deadline, Faraday Future, India.com, McAfee, MixBit, Molex, Mouser, Panasonic, PMC, Rotenza, Variety, Vishay
2016–17	Black, White	Red	Faraday Future	Argo Group, Instaforex, LeEco, Molex, Mouser, Panasonic, PMC, TTI, Variety
2017–18	Red	White		Argo Group, BGR, Instaforex, Molex, Mouser, Neom, PMC, Robb Report, TTI, Variety
2018–19	Black	White	GEOX	Argo Group, AVX, BGR, Instaforex, Molex, Mouser, Neom, Robb Report, Rolling Stone, TTI, Variety, VIZIO
2019–20	Black, White	Red	GEOX	AVX, Molex, Mouser, Neom, PMC, Robb Report, Rolling Stone, TTI
2020–21	White	Red		AVX, APL, Billboard, Bosch, IQONIQ, Molex, Mouser, Neom, Rolling Stone, TTI, Variety, WWD
2021–22	Red	White		Billboard, Kyocera (Kyocera AVX), Molex, Mouser, Neom, PMC, Robb Report, Rolling Stone, SRMG, SXSW, TTI, Variety, WWD
2022–23	Black	Gold	DS	Billboard, Deadline, Golden Globe, Kyocera (Kyocera AVX), Molex, Mouser, Robb Report, Rolling Stone, Sportico, SRMG, SXSW, TotalEnergies, TTI, Variety, Vibe, WWD, Yahoo!
2023–24	Gold	Black	DS	Billboard, Golden Globe, Kyocera (Kyocera AVX), Molex, Mouser, Robb Report, Rolling Stone, Sportico, SRMG, SXSW, TotalEnergies, TTI, Variety, Vibe, WWD, Yahoo!
2024–25	Black	Gold	DS	Billboard, Golden Globe, Kyocera (Kyocera AVX), Molex, Mouser, PMC, Rolling Stone, SRMG, SXSW, Syensqo, TotalEnergies, TTI, WWD, Yahoo!
2025–26	Black	Gold	DS	Billboard, Deadline, Golden Globe, Kyocera (Kyocera AVX), Lockton, Molex, Mouser, PMC, Robb Report, Rohana, Rolling Stone, Sportico, SRMG, SXSW, Syensqo, The Hollywood Reporter, TotalEnergies, TTI, Variety, WWD

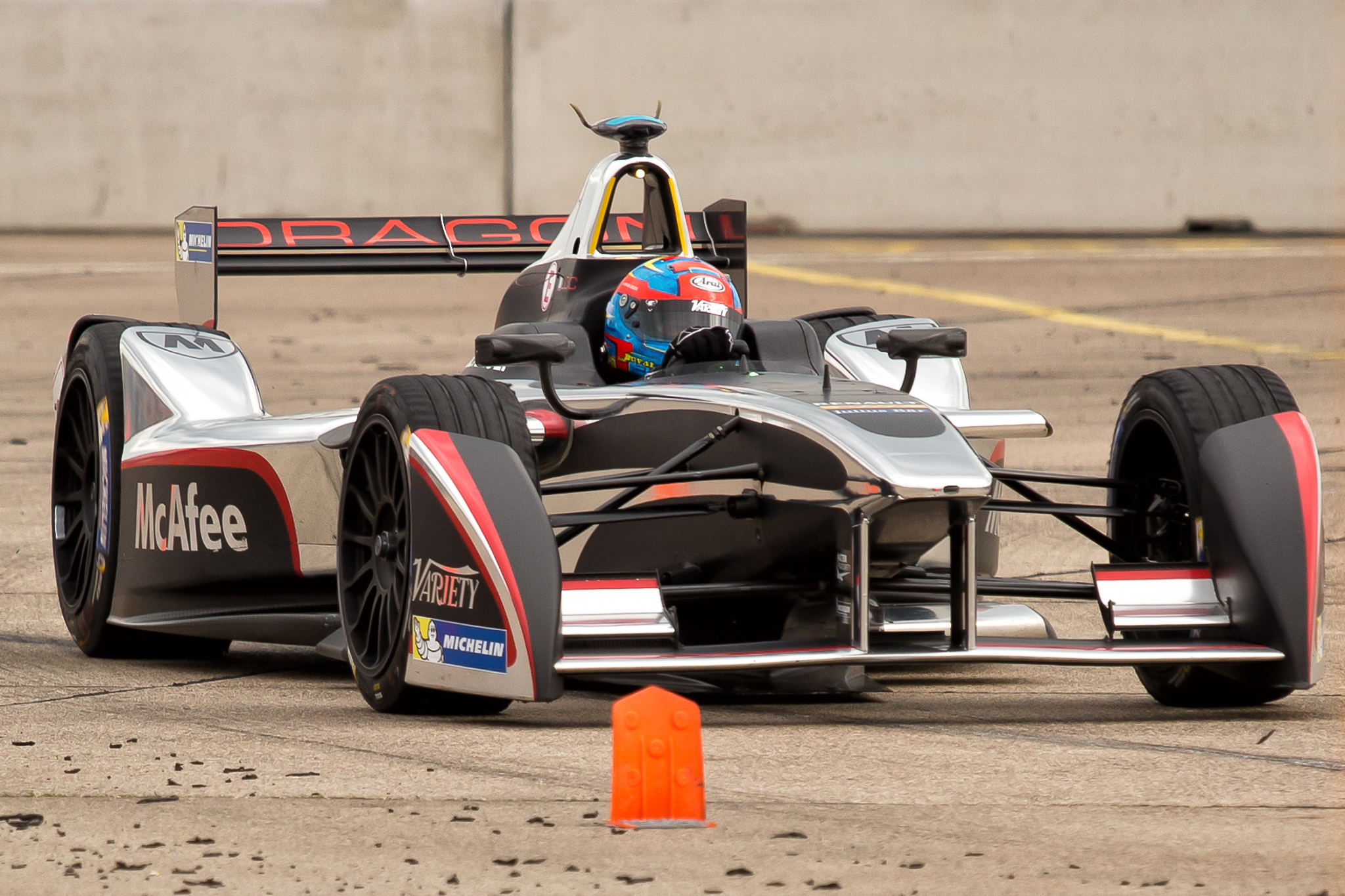
Loïc Duval driving the Spark-Renault SRT 01E at 2015 Berlin ePrix

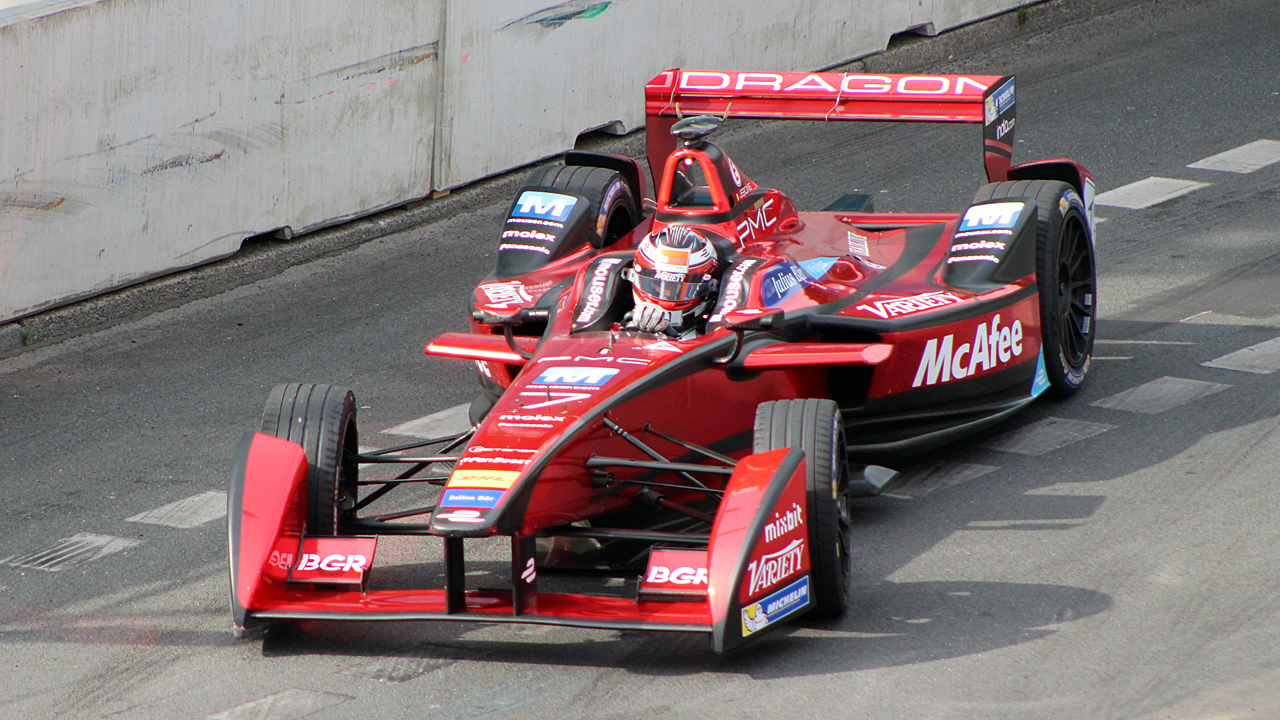
Jérôme d'Ambrosio driving the Spark-Renault SRT 01E at 2016 Berlin ePrix

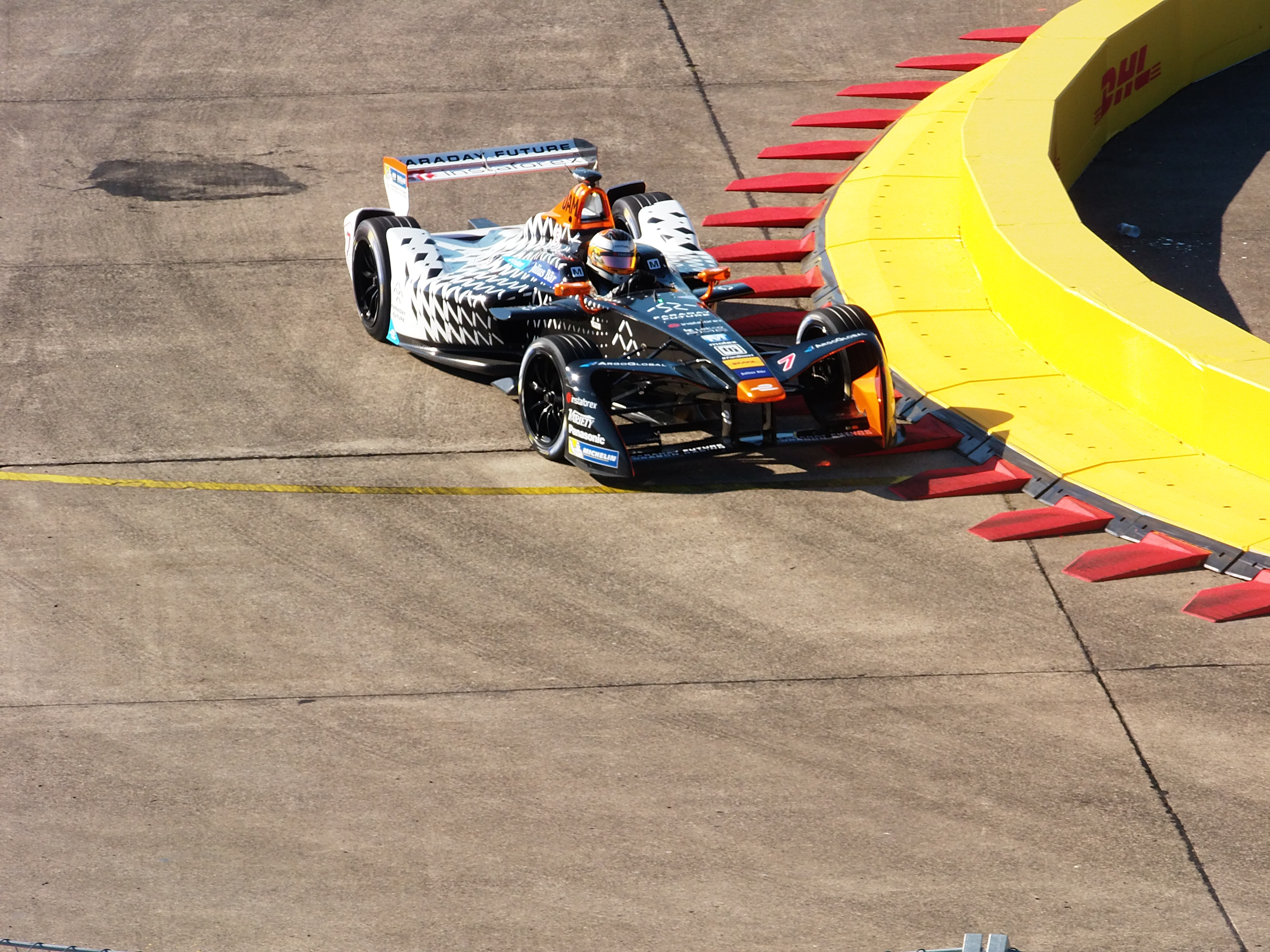
Jérôme d'Ambrosio driving the Spark-Renault SRT 01E at 2017 Berlin ePrix

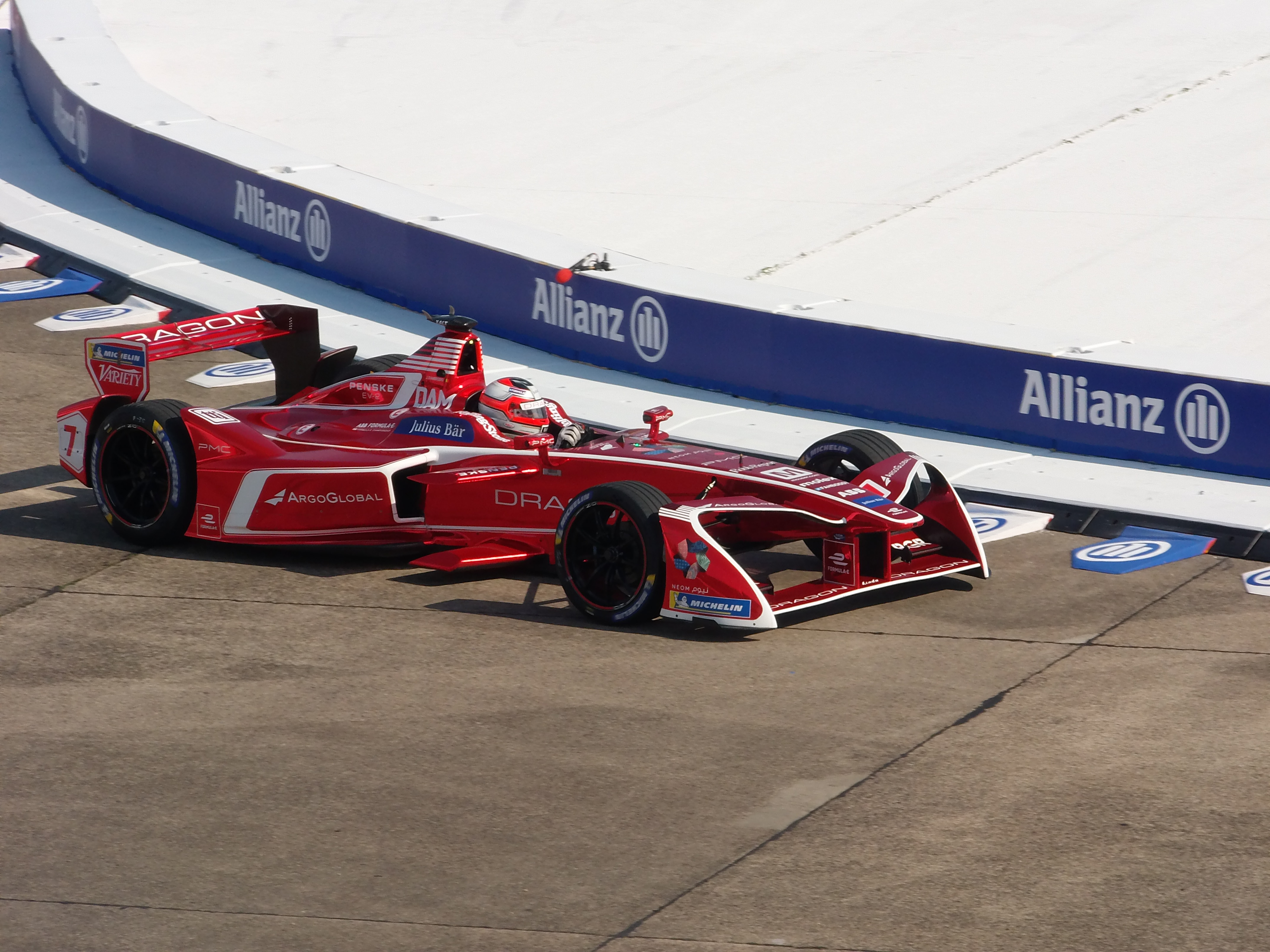
Jérôme d'Ambrosio driving the Spark-Renault SRT 01E at 2018 Berlin ePrix

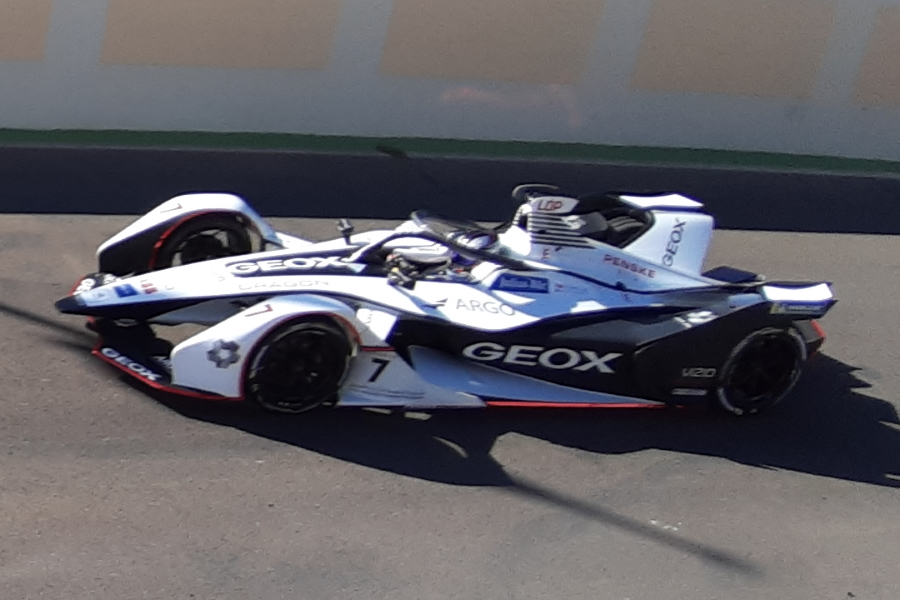
José María López driving the Spark SRT05e at 2019 Marrakesh ePrix

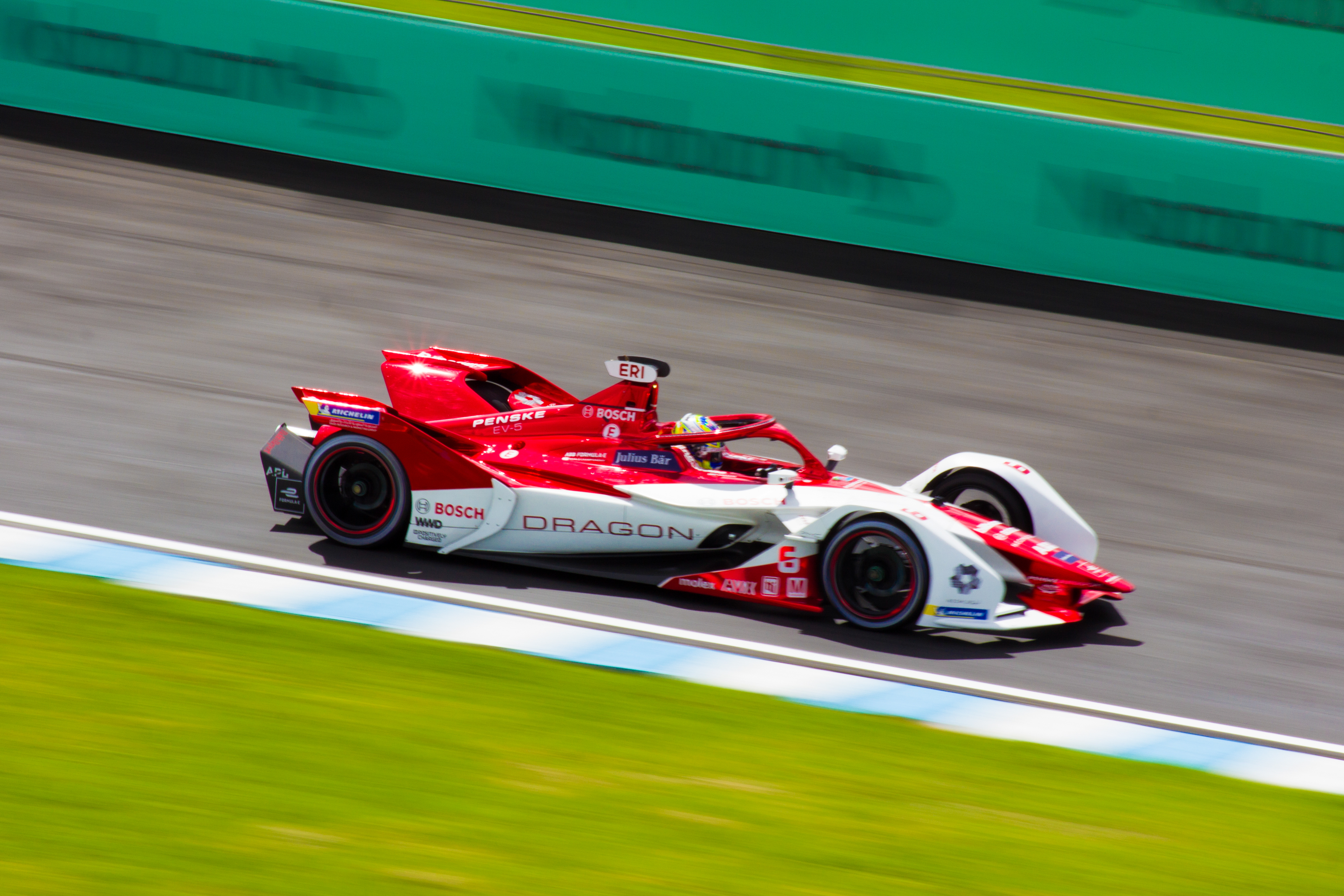
Joel Eriksson driving the Spark SRT05e at 2021 Puebla ePrix

Stoffel Vandoorne driving the Formula E Gen3 at 2023 Berlin ePrix

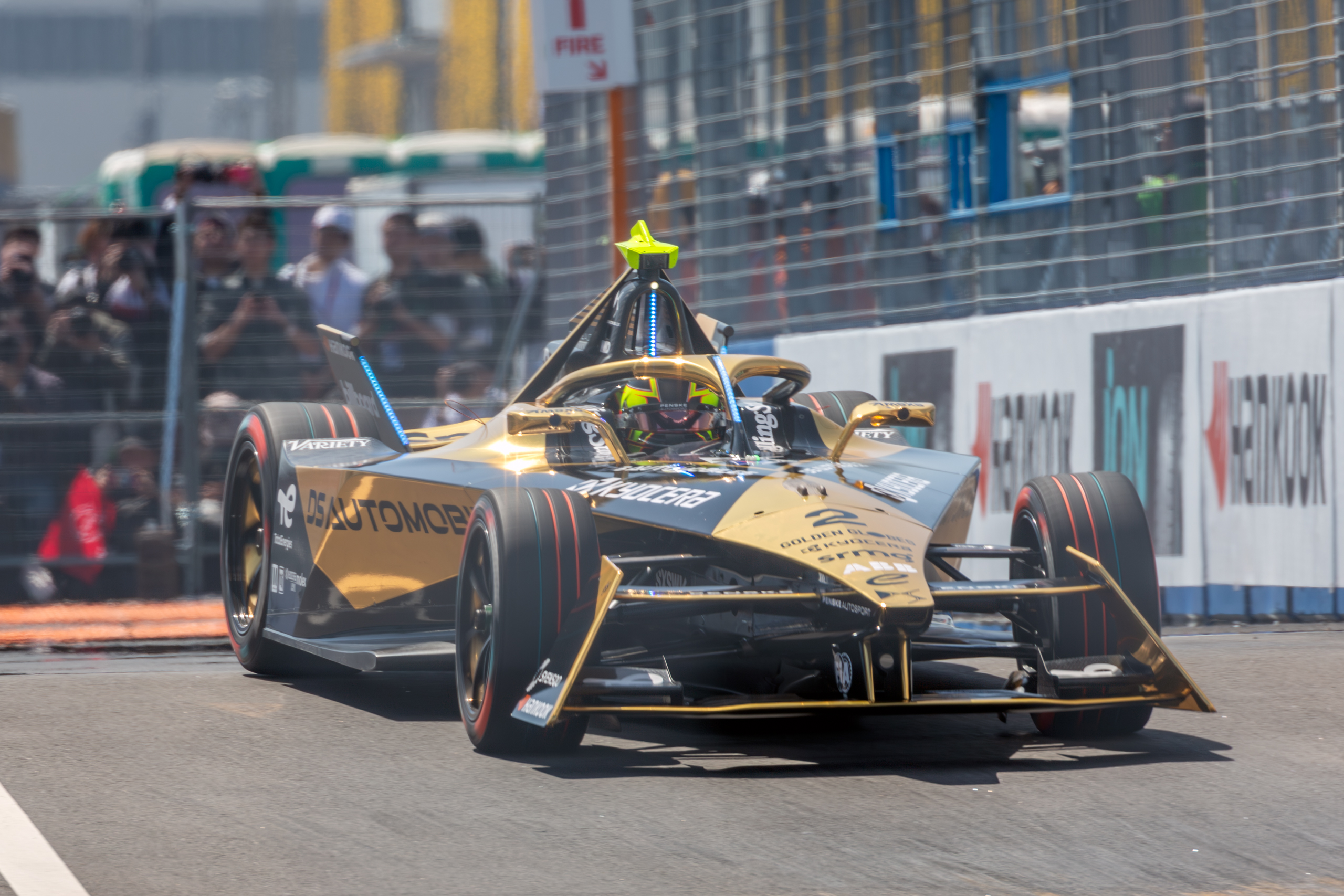
Stoffel Vandoorne driving the Formula E Gen3 at 2024 Tokyo ePrix

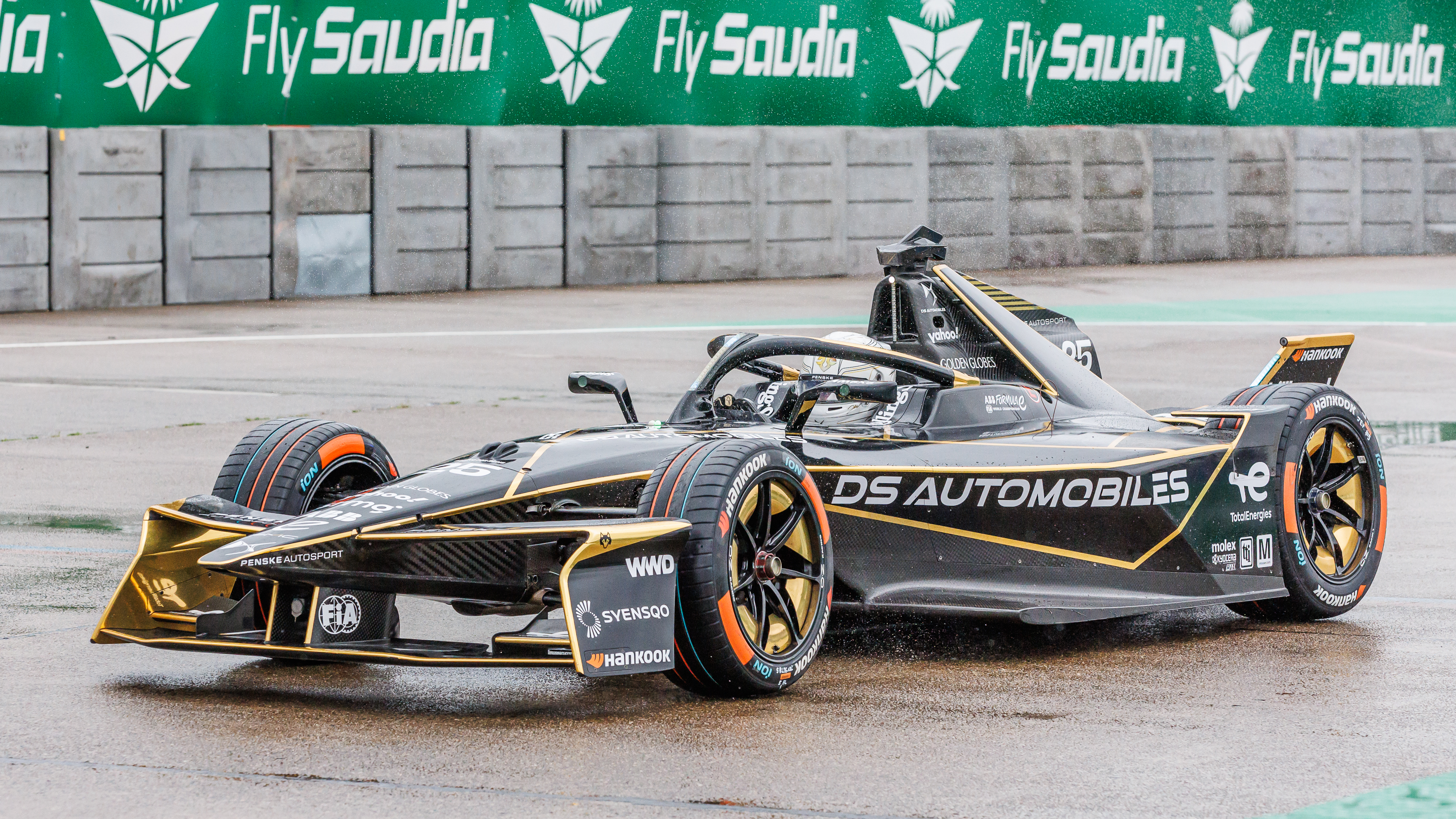
Jean-Eric Vergne driving the Formula E Gen3 EVO at 2025 Berlin ePrix

== Porsche ==
Season	Main colour(s)	Additional colour(s)	Main sponsor(s)	Additional major sponsor(s)	Special liveries
2019–20	Black	Red, White	Porsche, TAG Heuer	Ansys, Hugo Boss, Mobil 1, Vodafone	
2020–21	Black	Red, White	Porsche, TAG Heuer	Ansys, Hugo Boss, Mobil 1, Puma, Vodafone	
2021–22	Black	Red, White	Porsche, TAG Heuer	Ansys, Hugo Boss, Mobil 1, Puma, Vodafone	
2022–23	Black	Red, White	Porsche, TAG Heuer	Ansys, Cato Networks, Hugo Boss, Loctite, Mobil 1, Puma	
2023–24	Turquiose	White	Porsche, TAG Heuer	Ansys, Cato Networks, Loctite, Mobil 1, Puma	At 2024 Tokyo ePrix Porsche used a pink livery.
2024–25	Turquiose	Red, Black	Porsche, TAG Heuer	Ansys, Cato Networks, Loctite, Mobil 1, Puma	
2025–26	Turquiose	Red, Black	Porsche	AVEVA, DP World, Loctite, Mobil 1, Puma, Synopsys, TAG Heuer, TDK	

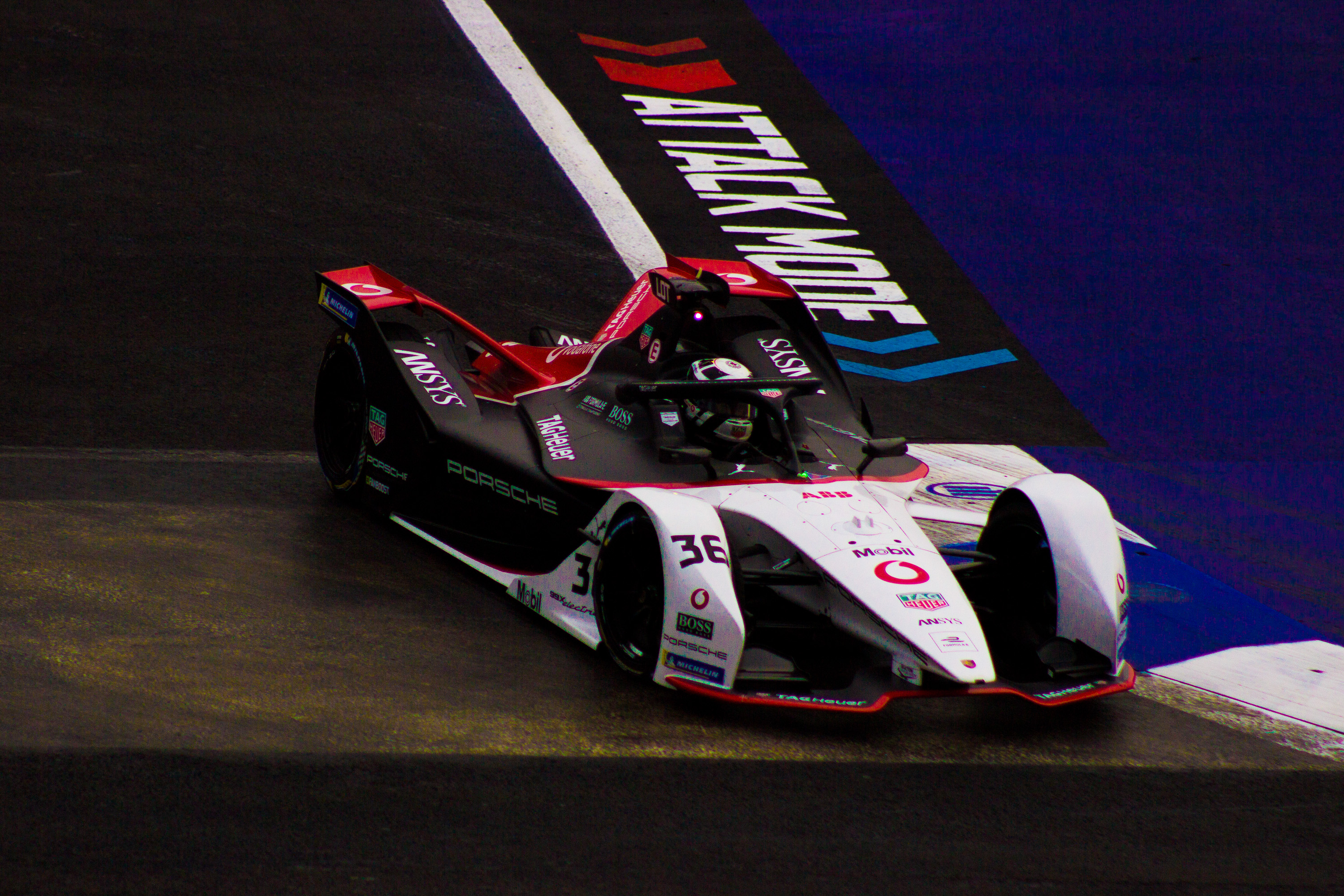
André Lotterer driving the Spark SRT05e at 2020 Mexico City ePrix

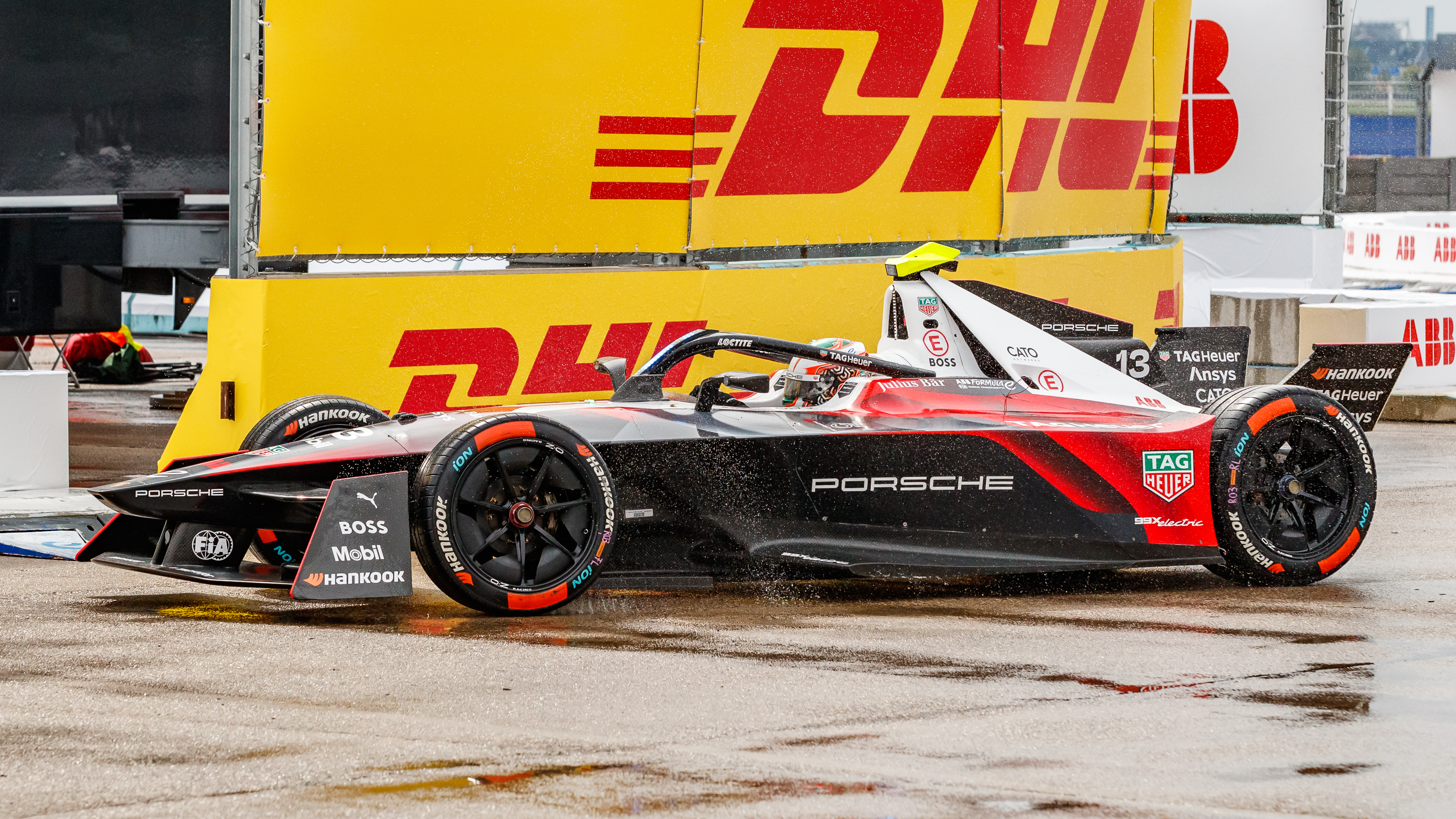
António Félix da Costa driving the Formula E Gen3 at 2023 Berlin ePrix

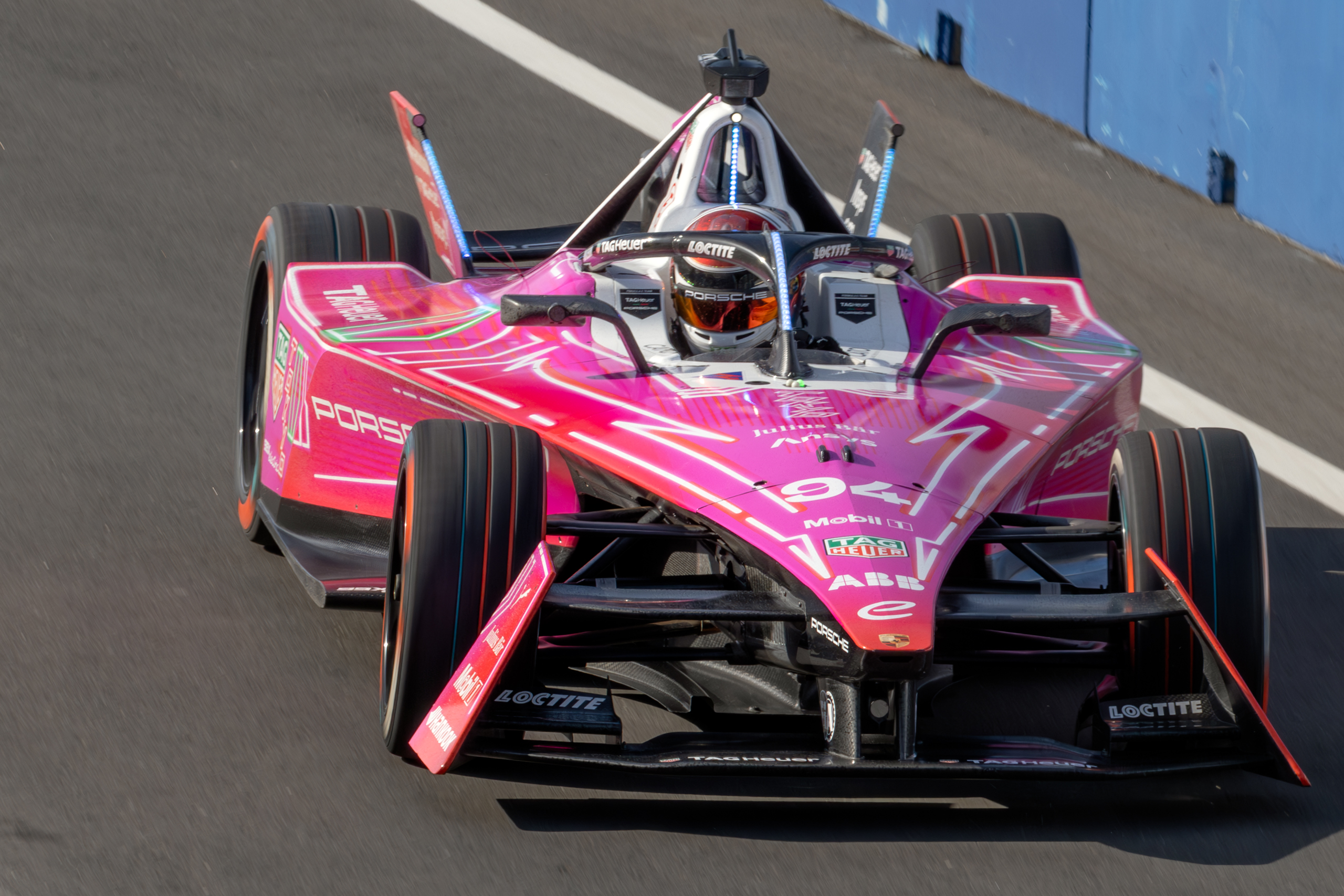
Pascal Wehrlein driving a special Porsche livery Formula E Gen3 at the 2024 Tokyo ePrix

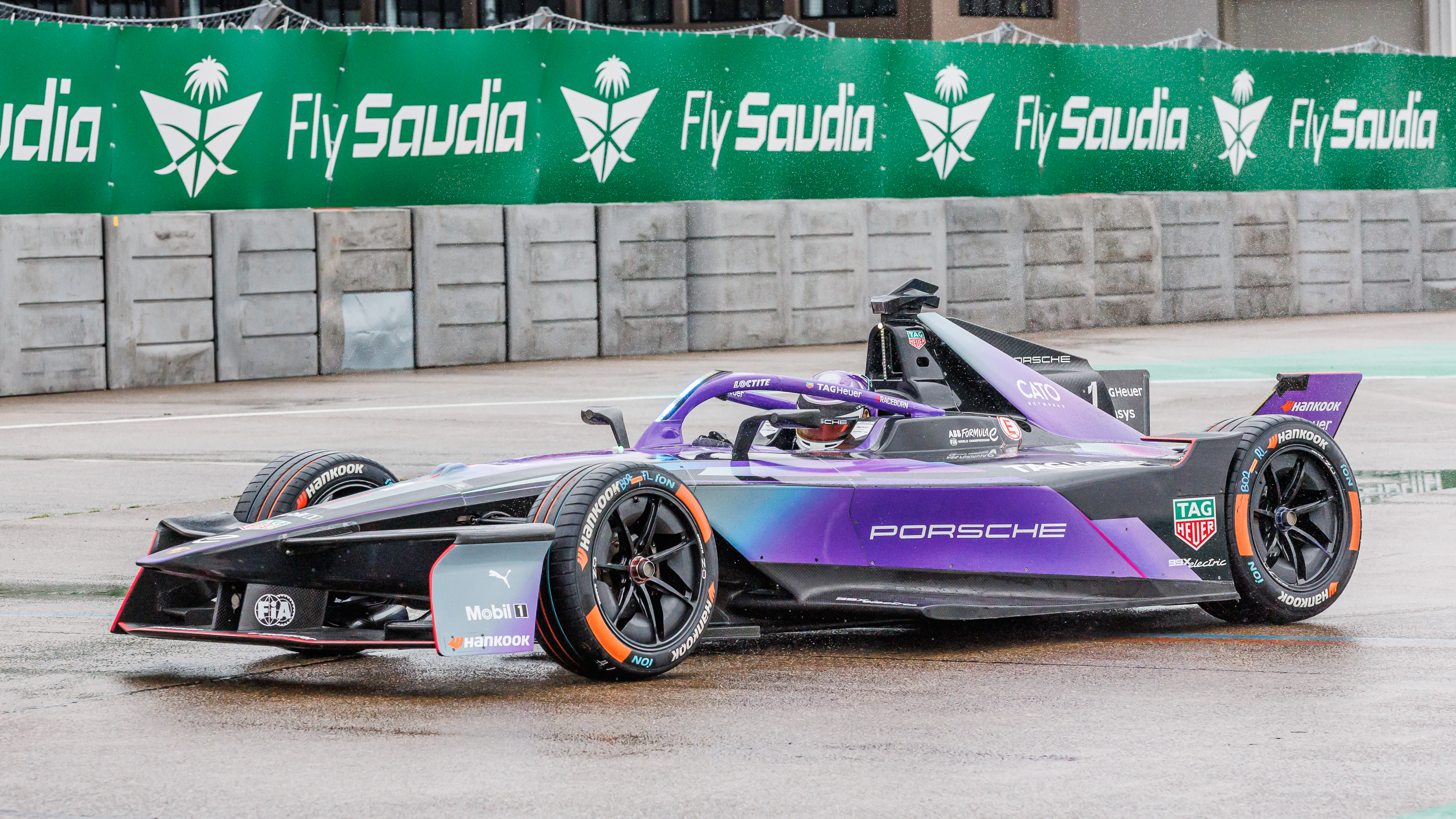
Pascal Wehrlein driving the Formula E Gen3 EVO at 2025 Berlin ePrix

== Techeetah ==
Season	Main colour(s)	Additional colour(s)	Main sponsor(s)	Additional major sponsor(s)
2016–17	Black	Gold		The Peninsula Shanghai, SECA, CMC
2017–18	Gold	Black		The Peninsula Shanghai, Dragon, Efacec, Foin, Meccanica, PerkinElmer, Paddock Zone, SECA, CMC
2018–19	Gold	Black	DS	Total, Efacec, Foin, Acronis, Atlantis Sanya
2019–20	Gold	Black	DS	Total, Efacec, Acronis
2020–21	Gold	Black	DS	Total, Efacec, Acronis, Mahle, eToro, Rakuten, Yahoo!, IQONIQ, Afex, Teng Tools, BenQ, DR1VA, Alpinestars
2021–22	Gold	Black	DS	TotalEnergies, Mahle, Yahoo!, Rakuten Viber, Teng Tools, BenQ, Alpinestars

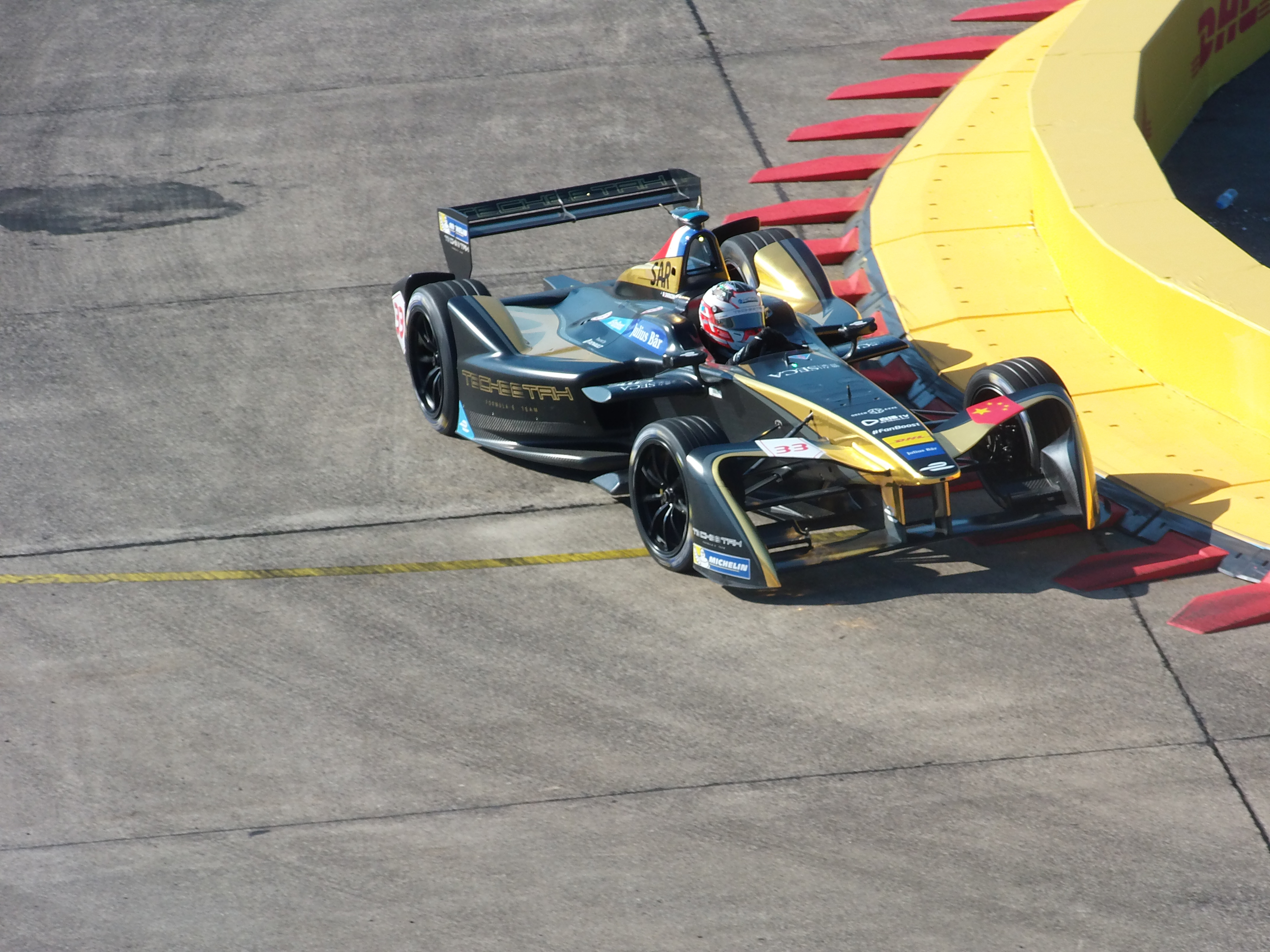
Stéphane Sarrazin driving the Spark-Renault SRT 01E at 2017 Berlin ePrix

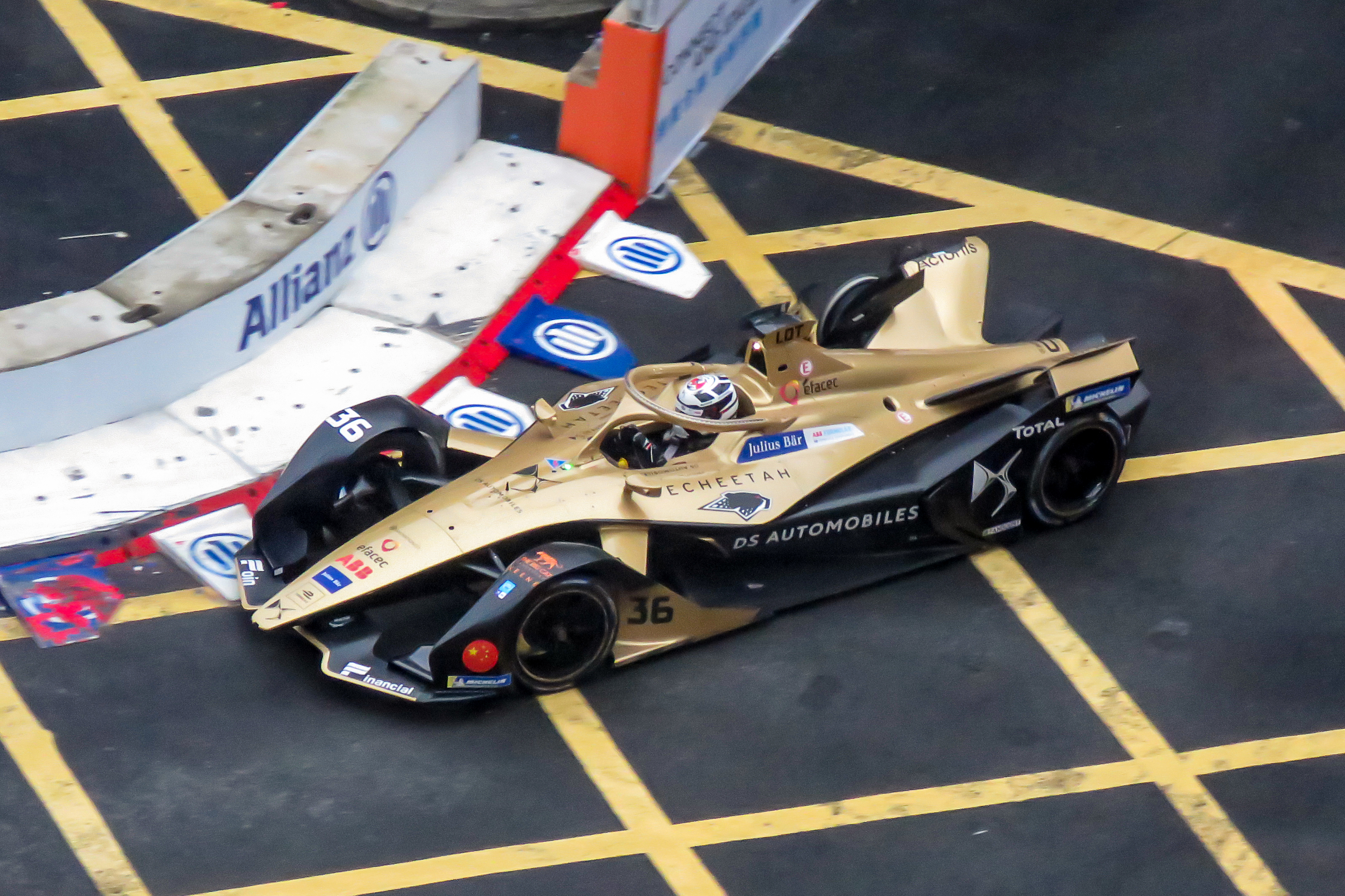
André Lotterer driving the Spark SRT05e at 2019 Hong Kong ePrix

== Trulli ==
Season	Main colour(s)	Additional colour(s)	Main sponsor(s)	Additional major sponsor(s)
2014–15	Blue, White	Green		Cartils, Drayson, JH 1912, Jihua Park

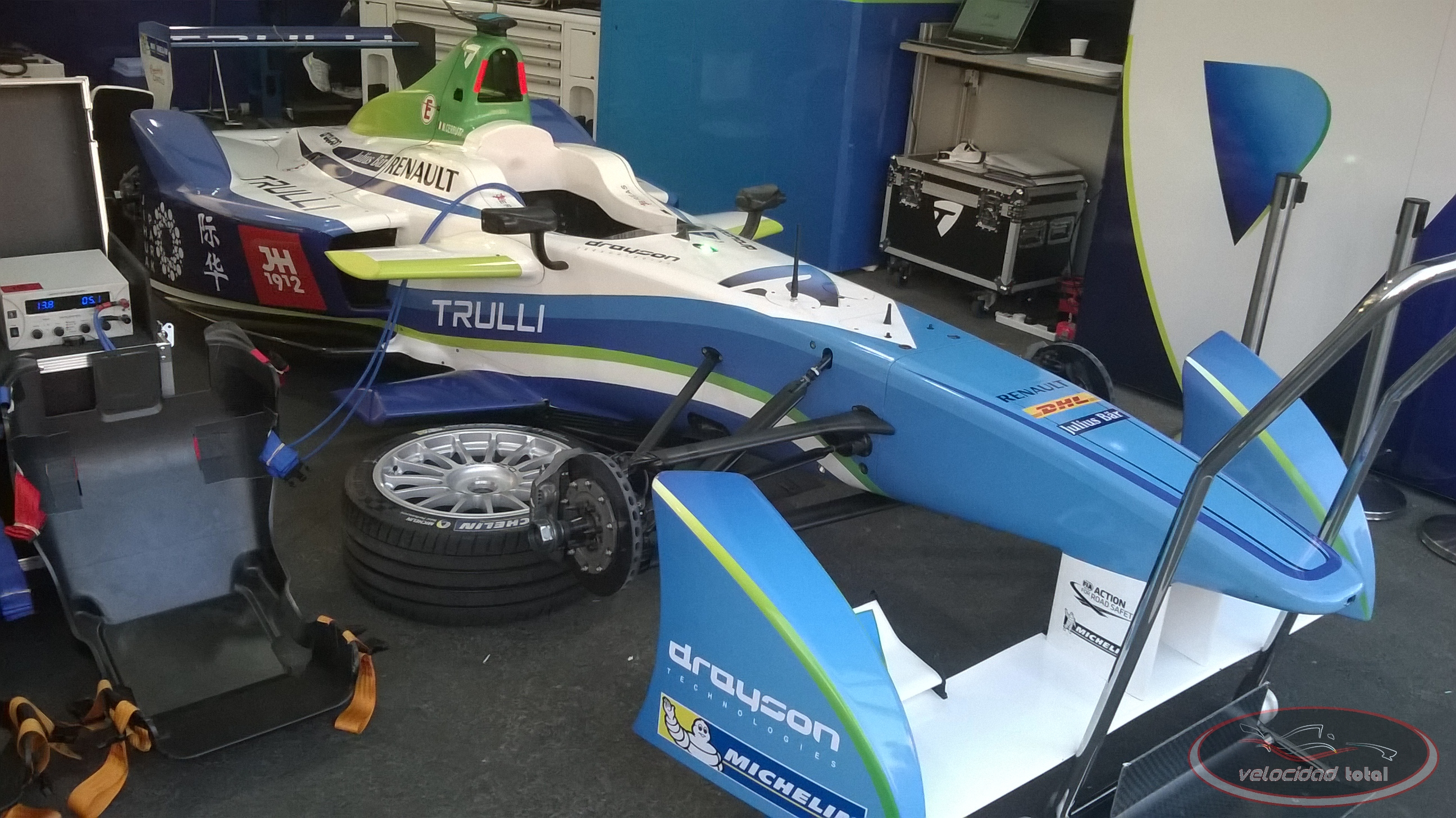
Trulli car at 2014 Punta del Este ePrix

== Venturi ==
Season	Main colour(s)	Additional colour(s)	Main sponsor(s)	Additional major sponsor(s)
2014–15	Black	Red, White	Venturi	Fondation Prince Albert II de Monaco
2015–16	Black	Red, White	Venturi	Ars, Brasserie de Monaco, Fondation Prince Albert II de Monaco
2016–17	Red	Black, Blue	Venturi	Fondation Prince Albert II de Monaco, Mario Bertulli, ROHM, ZF
2017–18	Red	Black, Silver	Venturi	Fondation Prince Albert II de Monaco, Mario Bertulli, ROHM, ZF
2018–19	Silver	Blue	Venturi	Becker Carbon, Farasis Energy, Fondation Prince Albert II de Monaco, Hewlett Packard Enterprise, Richard Mille, ROHM, ZF
2019–20	Red	White, Black	ROKiT, Venturi	Acronis, Bandero, Fondation Prince Albert II de Monaco, Hewlett Packard Enterprise, Richard Mille
2020–21	Black	White	ROKiT, Venturi	Acronis, Hewlett Packard Enterprise, Richard Mille
2021–22	Black		ROKiT, Venturi	Craft 1861, elit Vodka, Hewlett Packard Enterprise, Julius Baer, Lukka Data

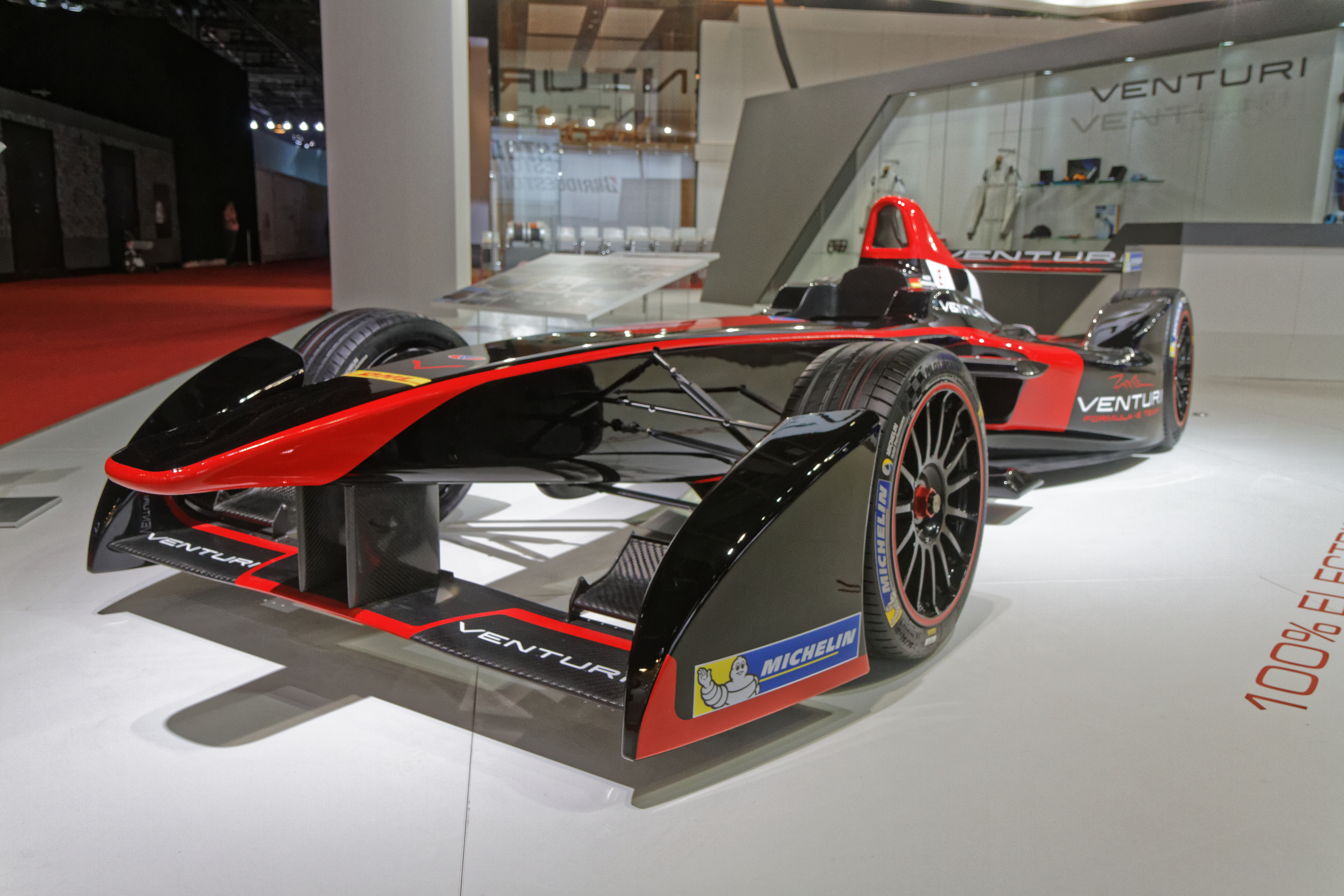
Venturi car at Mondial de l'Automobile de Paris

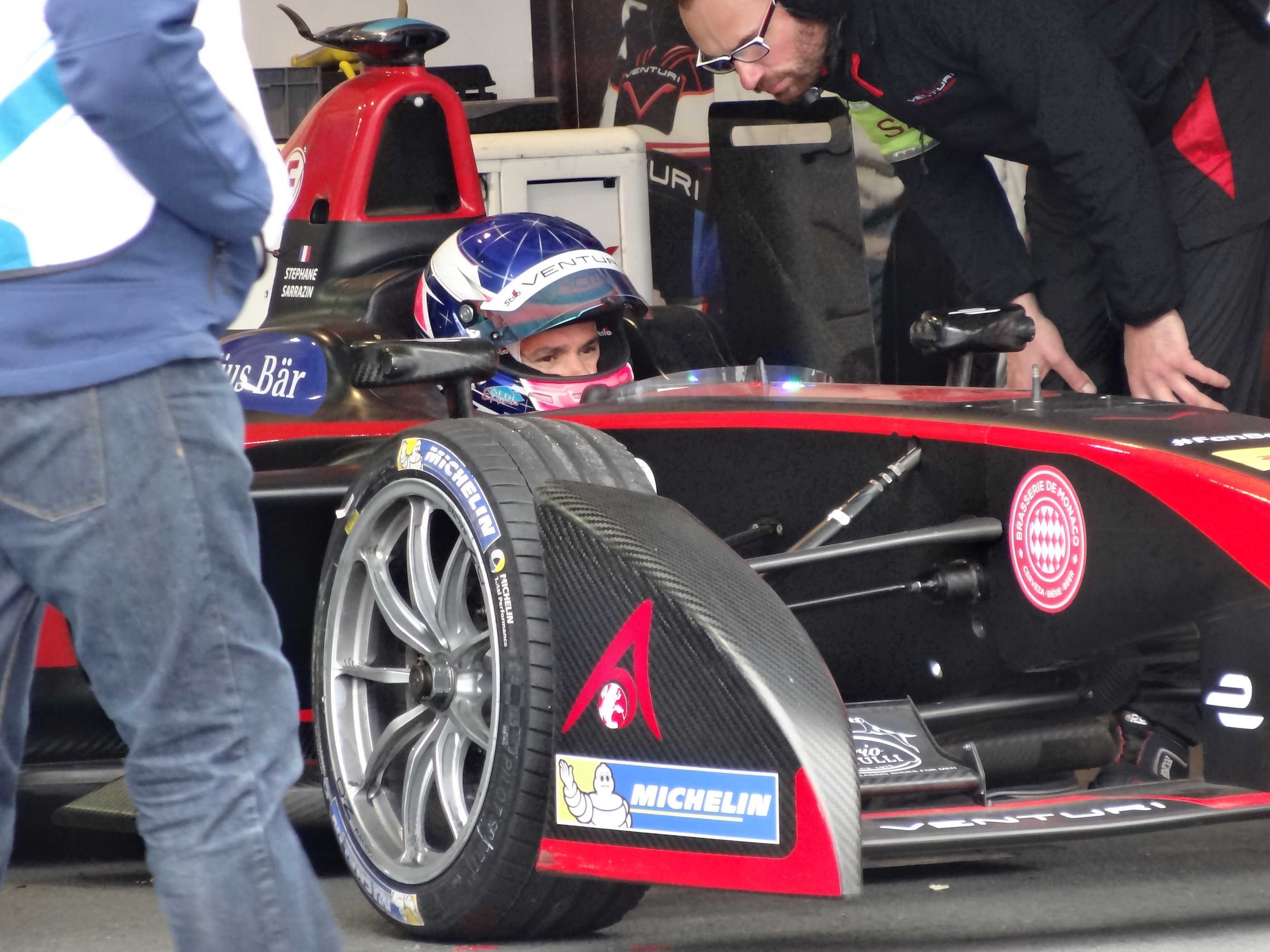
Stéphane Sarrazin driving the Spark-Renault SRT 01E at 2016 Paris ePrix

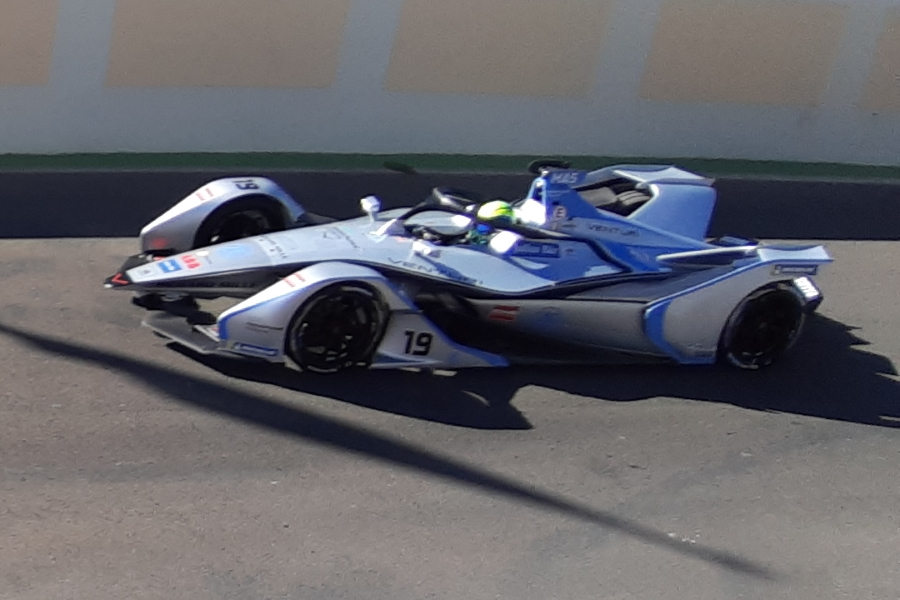
Felipe Massa driving the Spark SRT05e at 2019 Marrakesh ePrix

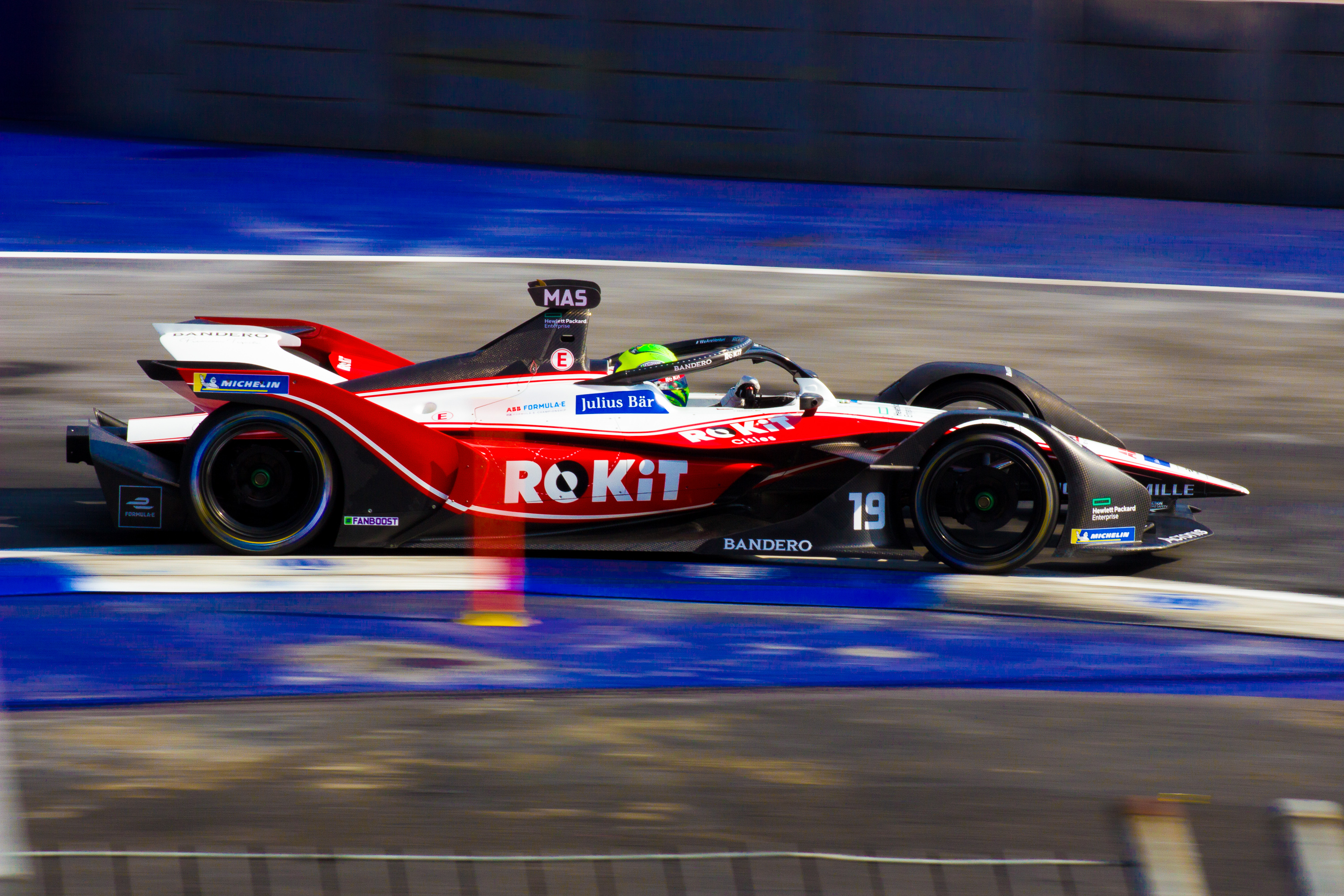
Felipe Massa driving the Spark SRT05e at 2020 Mexico City ePrix

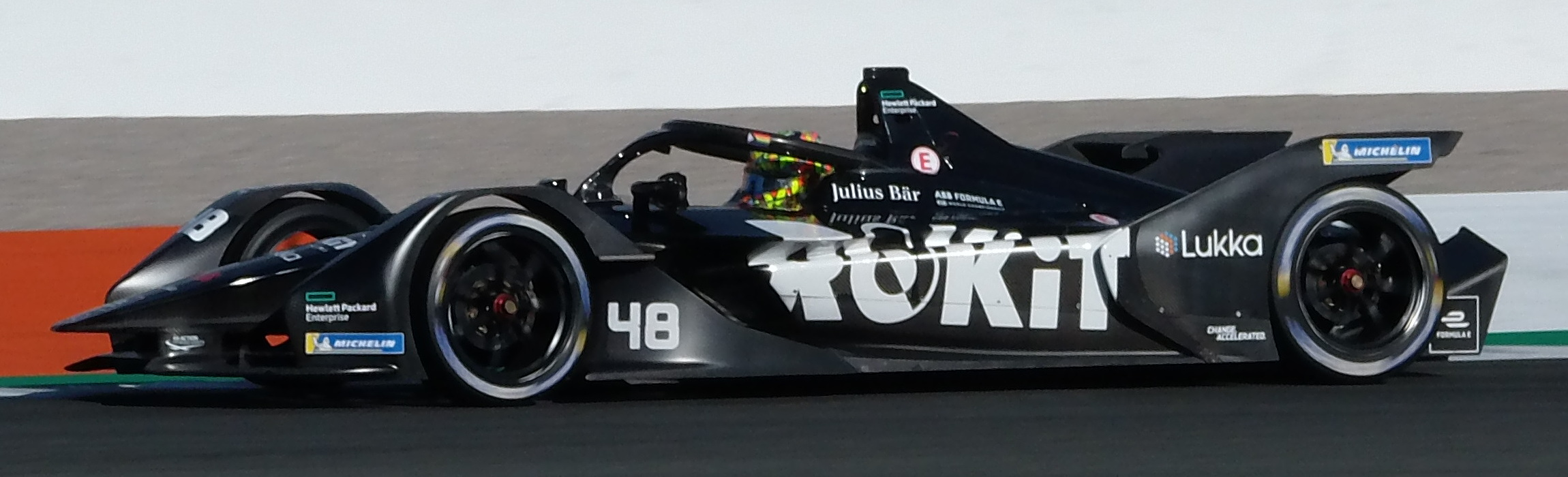
Edoardo Mortara driving the Spark SRT05e at 2021 the Pre-test season in Valencia
