= 1948–49 Boston College Eagles men's ice hockey season =

NCAA National Champion NEIHL, Champion NEIHL Tournament, Champion NCAA Tournament, Champion
- Conference: NEIHL
- Home ice: Boston Arena

Record
- Overall: 21–1
- Conference: 11–0
- Home: 12–0
- Road: 9–1
- Neutral: 2–0

Coaches and captains
- Head coach: John "Snooks" Kelley
- Captain: Bernie Burke

The 1948–49 Boston College Eagles men's ice hockey team represented the Boston College in intercollegiate college ice hockey during the 1948–49 NCAA men's ice hockey season. The head coach was John "Snooks" Kelley and the team captain was Bernie Burke. The team won the 1949 NCAA Men's Ice Hockey Tournament. The team's leading scorer was Jack Mulhern, who finished second in the NCAA in both goals (34) and points (65)

== Season ==
Boston College, looking to return to the tournament and improve upon their overtime loss in the semifinal the year before, opened the 1948–49 season with a 13–5 win over MIT. In January they welcomed fellow tournament hopeful Colorado College for one game and took the close match 6–5, improving their record to 7–0. Less than a month later they met the other eastern tournament team, Dartmouth, and lost their first game 2–4 in Hanover. They would make up for that win a month later by defeating the Indians at home. BC finished the regular season 17–1, never having to leave New England and only playing three games outside of the state and one other outside the greater Boston area.

In March the Eagles played two tournaments. The first was the NEIHL Tournament (a precursor to the Beanpot) where they won two narrow victories over Northeastern and Boston University to win the championship. With a 19–1 record Boston College received the top eastern seed and played Colorado College in the first round of the NCAA Tournament The Eagles won the game handily, scoring seven against the Tigers to earn their right to the play for the title. The championship game was a rubber match for BC and Dartmouth and for their third meeting the two teams did not disappoint. The game had three lead changes before Jim Fitzgerald put the Eagles ahead for good in the third period and Boston College won the title 4–3.

This was the last BC team to win an ice hockey championship for 52 years. This was the first team to win a national title where all players were born in the same state or province. The 1949 national title game was the first one held between two eastern teams, the next time two eastern teams would meet in the final game was in 1967.

Note: While BC was a member of the NEIHL, the conference was not officially recognized by the NCAA and the Eagles were technically an independent program.

== Standings ==
1948–49 NCAA Independent ice hockey standings
| | Intercollegiate | | | | | | | Overall | | | | | |
| | GP | W | L | T | Pct. | GF | GA | GP | W | L | T | GF | GA |
|---|---|---|---|---|---|---|---|---|---|---|---|---|---|
| American International | 7 | 4 | 3 | 0 | .571 | 37 | 39 | 7 | 4 | 3 | 0 | 37 | 39 |
| Army | 14 | 7 | 7 | 0 | .500 | 52 | 59 | 15 | 8 | 7 | 0 | 58 | 63 |
| Boston College | 20 | 19 | 1 | 0 | .950 | 134 | 64 | 22 | 21 | 1 | 0 | 164 | 67 |
| Boston University | 20 | 13 | 7 | 0 | .650 | 147 | 77 | 20 | 13 | 7 | 0 | 147 | 77 |
| Bowdoin | – | – | – | – | – | – | – | 12 | 4 | 8 | 0 | – | – |
| Brown | – | – | – | – | – | – | – | 14 | 7 | 7 | 0 | 58 | 62 |
| California | – | – | – | – | – | – | – | – | – | – | – | – | – |
| Clarkson | – | – | – | – | – | – | – | 13 | 8 | 5 | 0 | 69 | 59 |
| Colby | – | – | – | – | – | – | – | – | – | – | – | – | – |
| Colgate | – | – | – | – | – | – | – | 9 | 5 | 3 | 1 | 53 | 38 |
| Colorado College | – | – | – | – | – | – | – | 24 | 15 | 7 | 1 | 153 | 99 |
| Dartmouth | – | – | – | – | – | – | – | 23 | 17 | 6 | 0 | 148 | 72 |
| Fort Devens State | – | – | – | – | – | – | – | – | – | – | – | – | – |
| Georgetown | – | – | – | – | – | – | – | – | – | – | – | – | – |
| Hamilton | – | – | – | – | – | – | – | 10 | 1 | 9 | 0 | – | – |
| Harvard | – | – | – | – | – | – | – | 20 | 12 | 8 | 0 | 130 | 112 |
| Lehigh | 3 | 1 | 2 | 0 | .333 | 7 | 16 | 6 | 2 | 4 | 0 | 18 | 48 |
| Massachusetts | – | – | – | – | – | – | – | 3 | 0 | 3 | 0 | 11 | 29 |
| Michigan | – | – | – | – | – | – | – | 25 | 20 | 2 | 3 | 179 | 74 |
| Michigan Tech | – | – | – | – | – | – | – | 15 | 5 | 10 | 0 | 66 | 76 |
| Middlebury | – | – | – | – | – | – | – | 10 | 6 | 4 | 0 | – | – |
| Minnesota | – | – | – | – | – | – | – | 22 | 11 | 11 | 0 | 120 | 101 |
| Minnesota–Duluth | – | – | – | – | – | – | – | 7 | 7 | 0 | 0 | 44 | 12 |
| MIT | – | – | – | – | – | – | – | 9 | 4 | 5 | 0 | – | – |
| New Hampshire | – | – | – | – | – | – | – | 3 | 0 | 3 | 0 | 11 | 23 |
| North Dakota | – | – | – | – | – | – | – | 22 | 9 | 12 | 1 | 109 | 148 |
| North Dakota Agricultural | – | – | – | – | – | – | – | – | – | – | – | – | – |
| Northeastern | – | – | – | – | – | – | – | 16 | 9 | 7 | 0 | 118 | 78 |
| Princeton | – | – | – | – | – | – | – | 20 | 6 | 13 | 1 | 60 | 110 |
| Saint Michael's | – | – | – | – | – | – | – | 4 | 0 | 4 | 0 | 23 | 38 |
| St. Lawrence | – | – | – | – | – | – | – | 7 | 5 | 2 | 0 | 41 | 29 |
| Union | – | – | – | – | – | – | – | 1 | 0 | 1 | 0 | – | – |
| Williams | – | – | – | – | – | – | – | 14 | 5 | 9 | 0 | – | – |
| Wyoming | – | – | – | – | – | – | – | 9 | 4 | 5 | 0 | 51 | 45 |
| Yale | – | – | – | – | – | – | – | 22 | 9 | 13 | 0 | 77 | 103 |

== Schedule ==
During the season Boston College compiled a 21–1 record. By winning the national title the team set a record for the fewest losses by a national champion that would stand until 1970. Their schedule was as follows.

| Date | Opponent | Score | Result | Venue | Location | Record |
| Dec. 1, 1948 | MIT | 13–5 | Win | Boston Arena | Boston, MA | 1–0 |
| Dec. 6, 1948 | Brown | 5–1 | Win | Skating Club of Boston | Brighton, MA | 2–0 |
| Dec. 11, 1948 | Yale | 3–1 | Win | New Haven Arena | New Haven, CT | 3–0 |
| Dec. 13, 1948 | Fort Devens State | 22–1 | Win | Skating Club of Boston | Brighton, MA | 4–0 |
| Dec. 15, 1948 | Harvard | 9–4 | Win | Boston Arena | Boston, MA | 5–0 |
| Dec. 21, 1948 | Boston University | 5–1 | Win | Boston Arena | Boston, MA | 6–0 |
| Jan. 2, 1949 | Colorado College | 6–5 | Win | Boston Arena | Boston, MA | 7–0 |
| Jan. 10, 1949 | MIT | 11–5 | Win | Skating Club of Boston | Brighton, MA | 8–0 |
| Jan. 12, 1949 | Harvard | 8–5 | Win | Boston Arena | Boston, MA | 9–0 |
| Jan. 27, 1949 | Dartmouth | 2–4 | Loss | Davis Rink | Hanover, NH | 9–1 |
| Feb. 1, 1949 | Northeastern | 7–4 | Win | Boston Arena | Boston, MA | 10–1 |
| Feb. 2, 1949 | American International | 10–2 | Win | Boston Arena | Boston, MA | 11–1 |
| Feb. 7, 1949 | Princeton | 5–2 | Win | Skating Club of Boston | Brighton, MA | 12–1 |
| Feb. 9, 1949 | Northeastern | 9–1 | Win | Boston Arena | Boston, MA | 13–1 |
| Feb. 18, 1949 | St. Nick's | 8–2 | Win | Crystal Ice Palace | Norwalk, CT | 14–1 |
| Feb. 22, 1949 | Dartmouth | 7–4 | Win | Boston Arena | Boston, MA | 15–1 |
| Feb. 25, 1949 | American International | 6–3 | Win | Big E Coliseum | West Springfield, MA | 16–1 |
| Mar. 1, 1949 | Boston University | 6–2 | Win | Boston Arena | Boston, MA | 17–1 |
New England Tournament
| Mar. 8, 1949 | Northeastern | 5–4 | Win | Boston Arena | Boston, MA | 18–1 |
| Mar. 9, 1949 | Boston University | 6–5 | Win | Boston Arena | Boston, MA | 19–1 |
NCAA Tournament
| March 15, 1949 | Colorado College | 7–3 | Win | Broadmoor World Arena | Colorado Springs, CO | 20–1 |
| March 17, 1949 | Dartmouth | 4–3 | Win | Broadmoor World Arena | Colorado Springs, CO | 21–1 |
| | | 164–67 | | | | 21–1 |

* Denotes overtime periods

== Roster and scoring statistics ==
| No. | Name | Year | Position | Hometown | S/P/C | Games | G | A | Pts | PIM |
|---|---|---|---|---|---|---|---|---|---|---|
| | Jack Mulhern | Sophomore | F | Boston, MA | (Massachusetts) | 22 | 34 | 31 | 65 | 18 |
| | Warren Lewis | Junior | C | Arlington, MA | (Massachusetts) | 21 | 23 | 24 | 47 | 6 |
| | Jim Fitzgerald | Senior | LW | Cambridge, MA | (Massachusetts) | 22 | 18 | 23 | 41 | 2 |
| | Fran Harrington | Sophomore | F | Norwood, MA | (Massachusetts) | 22 | 18 | 21 | 39 | 6 |
| | John McIntire | Junior | RW | Medford, MA | (Massachusetts) | 19 | 22 | 13 | 35 | 18 |
| | Len Ceglarski | Sophomore | F | East Walpole, MA | (Massachusetts) | 13 | 13 | 21 | 34 | 8 |
| | Butch Songin | Junior | D | Walpole, MA | (Massachusetts) | 22 | 9 | 20 | 29 | 18 |
| | John Gallagher | Senior | D | Brighton, MA | (Massachusetts) | 21 | 10 | 2 | 12 | 6 |
| | Giles Threadgold | Junior | F | Auburndale, MA | (Massachusetts) | 15 | 7 | 4 | 11 | 4 |
| | Walt Delorey | Junior | F | Watertown, MA | (Massachusetts) | 22 | 5 | 5 | 10 | 18 |
| | Joe McCusker | Junior | D | Waltham, MA | (Massachusetts) | 7 | 2 | 5 | 7 | 4 |
| | John Mahler | | F | Belmont, MA | (Massachusetts) | 12 | 0 | 3 | 3 | 2 |
| | Bill Byrne | | F | Cambridge, MA | (Massachusetts) | 7 | 1 | 1 | 2 | 0 |
| | Ken Dooley | | F | | | 6 | 1 | 1 | 2 | 2 |
| | Bill Walsh | Junior | F | Arlington, MA | (Massachusetts) | 12 | 0 | 2 | 2 | 0 |
| | Paul Finnegan | | F | | | 3 | 1 | 0 | 1 | 2 |
| | Frank Shellenback | Junior | F | Newton, MA | (Massachusetts) | 13 | 1 | 0 | 1 | 2 |
| | Ken Ahearn | | F | | | 2 | 0 | 0 | 0 | 0 |
| | Bill Talbot | Senior | F | Belmont, MA | (Massachusetts) | 14 | 0 | 0 | 0 | 0 |
| | Bernie Burke | Senior | G | Melrose, MA | (Massachusetts) | 21 | 0 | 0 | 0 | 0 |
| | Ed Casey | Junior | G | Dorchester, MA | (Massachusetts) | 4 | 0 | 0 | 0 | 0 |
| | Norm Dailey | Senior | G | Lexington, MA | (Massachusetts) | 6 | 0 | 0 | 0 | 0 |
| | Joe Quinn | | G | | | 0 | 0 | 0 | 0 | 0 |
| Total | | | | | | | 165 | 176 | 341 | 116 |

- Note: Boston College players wore sweaters without numbers.
- Note: The Boston College record book lists the 1948-49 team as scoring 164 goals over the season but, in the player breakdown, has a total of 165 goals for the season.

== Goaltending statistics ==
| No. | Name | Games | Minutes | Wins | Losses | Ties | Goals Against | Saves | Shutouts | SV % | GAA |
|---|---|---|---|---|---|---|---|---|---|---|---|
| | Bernie Burke | 21 | – | 20 | 1 | 0 | – | – | 0 | – | 3.09 |
| | Ed Casey | 1 | 60 | 1 | 0 | 0 | 3 | – | 0 | – | 3.00 |
| | Norm Dailey | – | – | – | – | – | – | – | – | – | – |
| | Joe Quinn | – | – | – | – | – | – | – | – | – | – |
| Total | | 22 | – | 21 | 1 | 0 | | – | 0 | – | – |

== 1949 national championship ==
=== (E1) Boston College vs. (E2) Dartmouth ===
| March 19 | Boston College | 4 – 3 | Dartmouth | Broadmoor Ice Palace |

Scoring summary
| Period | Team | Goal | Assist(s) | Time | Score |
|---|---|---|---|---|---|
| 1st | BC | Warren Lewis | Fitzgerald | 6:04 | 1–0 BC |
| 1st | DC | Walter Crowley | Oss | 10:34 | 1–1 |
| 1st | DC | Bill Riley | unassisted | 19:32 | 2–1 DC |
| 2nd | BC | John McIntire | Lewis and Fitzgerald | 23:43 | 2–2 |
| 2nd | BC | Len Ceglarski | Harrington and Mulhern | 33:04 | 3–2 BC |
| 3rd | DC | Alan Kerivan | Crowley | 42:01 | 3–3 |
| 3rd | BC | Jim Fitzgerald | Lewis | 46:47 | 4–3 BC |

Goaltenders
| Team | Name | Saves | Goals against | Time on ice |
|---|---|---|---|---|
| BC | Bernie Burke | | 3 | |
| DC | Dick Desmond | | 4 | |

Butch Songin and Jack Mulhern were named to the All-Tournament First Team while Bernie Burke made the Second Team

== See also ==
- List of NCAA Division I Men's Ice Hockey Tournament champions
