= Arrow Electronics =

American company

Coordinates: 39.590568°N 104.869118°W

Arrow Electronics, Inc.

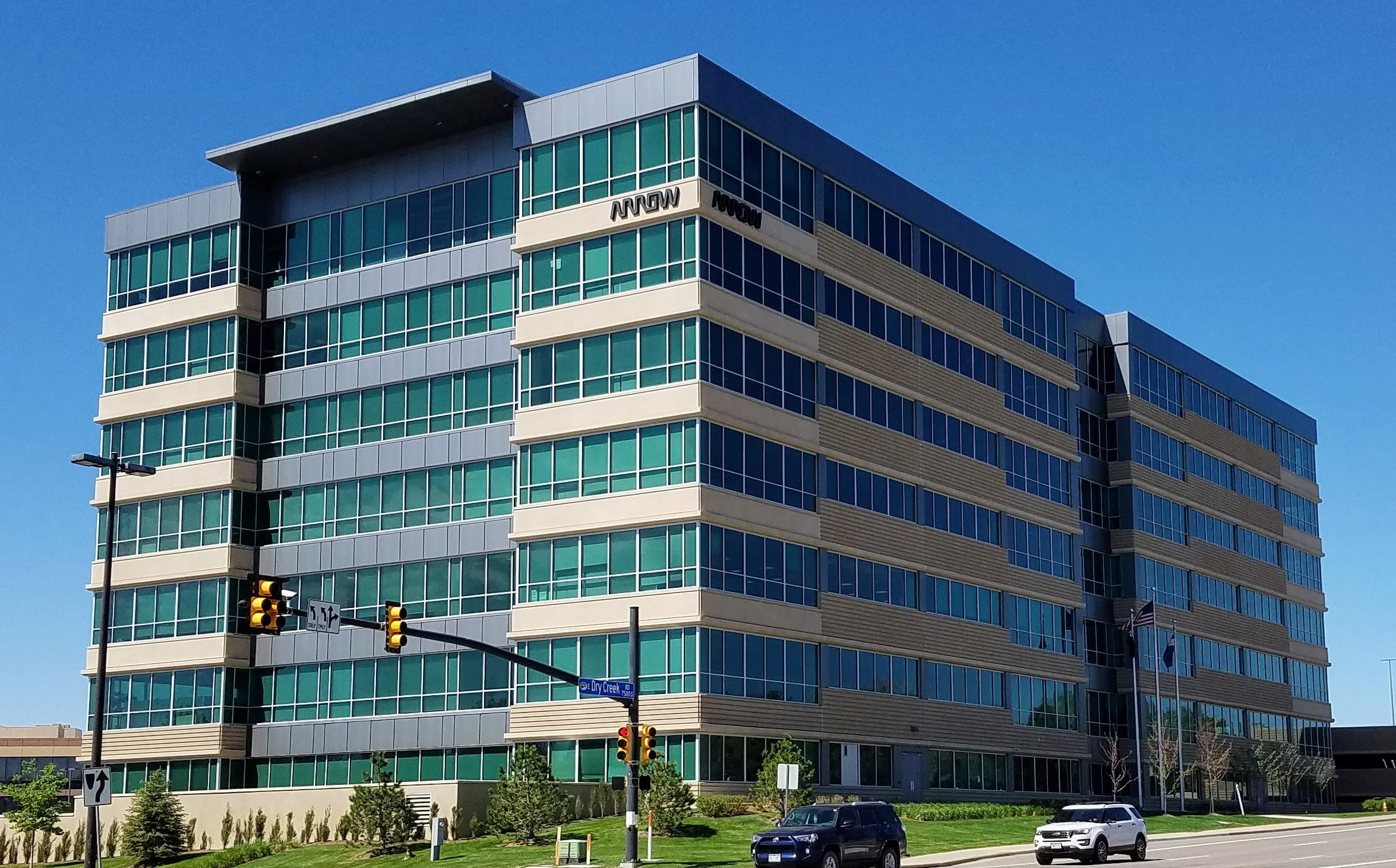
- Headquarters in Arapahoe County, Colorado
- Type: Public
- Traded as: NYSE: ARW; S&P 400 component
- Industry: Electronics
- Founded: 1935; 91 years ago in New York City, U.S.
- Headquarters: Centennial, Colorado, U.S.
- Revenue: ▲US$30.9 billion (2025)
- Operating income: ▲US$822 million (2025)
- Net income: ▲US$571 million (2025)
- Total assets: ▲US$29.1 billion (2025)
- Total equity: ▲US$6.58 billion (2025)
- Number of employees: 22,230 (2025)
- Website: arrow.com

Arrow Electronics, Inc., is an American company headquartered in Centennial, Colorado. A global provider of electronic components and enterprise computing products, the company specializes in distribution and value-added services for original equipment manufacturers, value-added resellers, managed service providers, contract manufacturers and other commercial customers. As of June 2026, the company is ranked at number 148 in the Fortune 500 list of the largest United States corporations by total revenue. The company has also been recognized for 26 years overall on Fortune's "World's Most Admired Companies" list.

== History ==
Arrow Electronics was founded in 1935 when a retail store named Arrow Radio opened on Cortlandt Street in the heart of lower Manhattan's "Radio Row", the birthplace of electronics distribution. Arrow Radio, established by Maurice ("Murray") Goldberg, sold used radios and radio parts to retail customers. Other industry pioneers with businesses nearby were Charles Avnet and Seymour Schweber.

By the 1940s, Arrow was selling new radios—manufactured by RCA, GE, and Philco—and other home entertainment products, as well as surplus radio parts that were retailed over-the-counter in a parts department at the back of the store. Soon the firm started seeking franchises to sell new parts; the first manufacturers to franchise Arrow were RCA and Cornell Dubilier. The business was incorporated as Arrow Electronics, Inc., in 1946.

In the early 1950s, with additional franchises and a small field sales organization, Arrow began selling electronic parts to industrial customers. A second storefront/sales office was opened in Mineola, Long Island, in 1956. By 1961, when the company completed its initial public offering and listed its shares on the American Stock Exchange, total sales amounted to $4 million, over half of which came from the industrial sales division, with the remainder from the traditional retail business. During the 1960s, Arrow moved its headquarters to Farmingdale, New York (Long Island), and opened additional branches in Norwalk, Connecticut, and Totowa, New Jersey. The company relocated its headquarters office to Centennial, Colorado, in 2011.

In 1968, Glenn, Green & Waddell, a partnership formed by three recent graduates of the Harvard Business School, B. Duke Glenn, Jr., Roger E. Green, and John C. Waddell, led a private investor group that acquired the controlling interest in Arrow. The investors saw an opportunity to consolidate the fragmented electronics industry. Duke Glenn served as chairman.

== 1970s ==
During the 1970s decade, by winning key semiconductor franchises (led by Texas Instruments in 1970) and opening sales offices in over 20 U.S. cities, Arrow grew its electronics distribution business at an average annual rate of 34 percent. By the end of the decade, the company's electronics distribution sales had climbed to $177 million, making Arrow the country's second largest electronics distributor.

The company took on high levels of debt through frequent public bond offerings, to fund its growth strategy. Additional growth capital was provided through the 1969 acquisition of Schuylkill Metals Corporation, a lead recycling company. (This business, having served its purpose, was sold in 1987 amidst problems associated with being designated an EPA Superfund site contaminated with lead and chromium.)

In the 1970s, Arrow discontinued its retail operations and inaugurated the electronics distribution's first integrated online, real-time computer system to provide up-to-the-minute inventory positions and facilitate remote order entry. In 1979, Arrow was listed on the New York Stock Exchange. That same year, it acquired Cramer Electronics (historically the U.S.'s second-largest distributor), the company's first major industry acquisition, which provided access to many markets in the western United States.

== 1980s to present ==
On December 4, 1980, the Stouffer's Inn Fire killed 13 members of Arrow's senior management, including Glenn and Green. Waddell assumed leadership and, in 1982, recruited Stephen P. Kaufman, formerly a partner of McKinsey & Company, to join Arrow as president of the company's electronics distribution division. Kaufman succeeded Waddell as CEO in 1986 and as chairman in 1994.

In 1988, Arrow adopted a growth strategy by acquiring Kierulff Electronics. According to Forbes, the company closed down all four Kierulff Electronics warehouses and within a year it experienced "miraculous" growth that went from a bottom line of $16 million loss in 1987 to operating profits of $10 million.

During his nearly two decades with Arrow, Kaufman led the company's consolidation of the U.S. electronics distribution industry as well as the company's expansion into Europe and the Asia Pacific region. Under Kaufman's leadership, Arrow completed over 50 acquisitions of electronics distributors, including such prominent names as Ducommun (Kierulff), Lex (Schweber), Zeus, Anthem, Bell, and Wyle (all in the U.S.), Spoerle (Germany), Silverstar (Italy), and CAL (Hong Kong and China). Kaufman also led the company into the national distribution of commercial computer products, initially through its acquisition of Gates/FA Distributing. Arrow entered the 21st century with global electronic component sales of $9 billion and $3 billion of sales in its computer products business. In 1998, Arrow Electronics established a 50/50 joint venture with Marubun Corporation of Japan called Marubun/Arrow in order to augment and support each other's operations in Asia and North America.

Kaufman stepped down as CEO in 2000, retired as chairman in 2002, and was succeeded by Daniel W. Duval, a 15-year Arrow board veteran. In 2003, William E. Mitchell, former president of the global services division of Solectron Corporation, joined Arrow as chief executive officer and, in 2006, became chairman. During Mitchell's six years at Arrow, sales climbed to $17 billion as the company increased shareholder returns, improved operating efficiencies, and completed 17 acquisitions.

In 2009, Michael J. Long succeeded Mitchell as CEO, and in 2010 took over as chairman. A long-time Arrow executive, Long joined the company in 1991 through the merger with Schweber Electronics and served in various senior management positions before becoming CEO. During Long's tenure, Arrow completed over 40 strategic acquisitions that further expanded its global components and computer systems businesses. In 2015, Arrow acquired United Technical Publishing from Hearst, adding properties such as Electronic Products and Schematics.com. In June 2016, UBM reached agreement to divest its electronics media portfolio to an affiliate of Arrow Electronics Inc. for a cash consideration of $23.5 million. The portfolio comprises the U.S. and Asian versions of EE Times, EDN, ESM, Embedded, EBN, TechOnline and Datasheets.com.

In June 2022, Sean J. Kerins succeeded Long as president and CEO. Having joined Arrow in 2007 as vice president of North America storage and networking, Kerins went on to serve as president of the company’s North America enterprise computing solutions business before being named global president of the business in 2014 and then chief operating officer in 2020. Kerins separated from the company in September 2025.

Arrow is ranked at number 148 on the Fortune 500 list of the largest United States corporations by total revenue. The company has also been recognized for 26 years overall on Fortune's “World’s Most Admired Companies” list.

== Recent acquisitions ==
Company name	Business	Country	Date of acquisition	Reference
eInfochips	Product Engineering and R&D Services	India	Jan 2018	
UBM Tech Electronics Network	Electronics Media and Publishing	UK	June 2016	
Distribution Central	Electronic Component Distribution	Australia	Mar 2016	
immixGroup	Information technology Public sector Distribution	United States	March 2015	
ATM Electronic	Electronic Component Distribution	Taiwan	Feb 2015	
Verical Inc.	Online parts catalog retailer	United States	April 2010	
Converge	Reverse logistics services provider	United States	April 2010	

== Sponsorship ==
Since 2012, Arrow has been sponsoring FIRST Robotics Competition, an international high school robotics competition.

In 2019, after being a minor sponsor of the team, Arrow became the title sponsor of Schmidt Peterson Motorsport (SPM) IndyCar team to become Arrow Schmidt Peterson Motorsport. In the same year, Arrow signed a sponsorship deal with McLaren Racing. McLaren would later announce that they will be entering the IndyCar Series with SPM as a joint entry for the 2020 season as Arrow McLaren SP. Arrow and McLaren signed a sponsorship extension in 2021 that saw Arrow continue as a sponsor for the McLaren F1 Team and as title sponsor for the IndyCar team, which was rebranded as Arrow McLaren IndyCar Team with the 2023 season. The title sponsorship deal will end after the 2028 season.

== See also ==
- Avnet
- DigiKey
- Master Electronics
- Mouser Electronics
