= 1947–48 North Dakota Fighting Sioux men's ice hockey season =

- Conference: Independent
- Home ice: Winter Sports Building

Record
- Overall: 11–5–0
- Home: 5–2–0
- Road: 6–3–0

Coaches and captains
- Head coach: Don Norman

The 1947–48 North Dakota Fighting Sioux men's ice hockey season was the 8th season of play for the program but first under the oversight of the NCAA. The Fighting Sioux represented the University of North Dakota and were coached by Don Norman, in his 1st season.

== Season ==
The program at North Dakota, still relatively new at this time, had a successful season. While the Sioux performed well versus non-collegiate opponents, it was against their peers where the team was strongest. UND defeated every other school they played at least once, but it was the victories over Michigan and Colorado College, both of whom would make the inaugural NCAA tournament, that demonstrated the potential of the Fighting Sioux.

The team used different captains for each game.

== Roster ==
| No. | Nat. | Player | Class | Pos | Height | Weight | DoB | Hometown | Previous team |
|---|---|---|---|---|---|---|---|---|---|
| 15 | (United States) | Jim Medved | Sophomore | F | | | 1926-06-24 | Crookston, Minnesota | Saint John's (MIAC) |
| 16 | (United States) | Arthur Forman | | G | | | | Wahpeton, North Dakota |
| 16 | (United States) | Bob Dorsher | | D | | | 1927-08-20 | Grand Forks, North Dakota |
| 17 | (United States) | Bob Murray | Sophomore | G | | | 1923-10-27 | Saint Paul, Minnesota |
| 18 | (United States) | Joe Silovich | Sophomore | F | | | 1922-05-04 | Eveleth, Minnesota |
| 19 | (United States) | John Noah | Freshman | D | | | 1927-11-21 | Crookston, Minnesota |
| 20 | (United States) | Cal Marvin | Sophomore | D | | | 1924-04-29 | Warroad, Minnesota |
| 20 | (United States) | Jim Williams | Sophomore | D | | | | Grand Forks, North Dakota |
| 21 | (United States) | Buzz Johnson | Sophomore | F | | | 1922-01-09 | Webster, South Dakota |
| 22 | (United States) | Gordon Christian | Sophomore | F | 5' 9" (1.75 m) | 165 lb (75 kg) | 1927-11-21 | Warroad, Minnesota |
| 23 | (United States) | Tom Buran | Sophomore | G | | | | Roseau, Minnesota | Roseau (USHS-MN) |
| 25 | (United States) | Bob Krumholz | Freshman | F | | | 1929-11-24 | Hallock, Minnesota |
| 26 | (United States) | Bill Sullivan | Sophomore | F | | | 1925-12-08 | Crookston, Minnesota |
| 27 | (United States) | Paul McKinnon | Freshman | D | | | 1929-04-29 | Williams, Minnesota | Warroad Lakers |
| 28 | (United States) | Ted Wilson | Freshman | F | | | | Warroad, Minnesota |
| 29 | (United States) | Jim Doyle | Sophomore | D/F | | | | Thief River Falls, Minnesota | Thief River Falls (USHS-MN) |
| 30 | (United States) | Wes Cole | | F | | | | Warroad, Minnesota | Warroad Lakers |
| 31 | (United States) | Prince Johnson | Sophomore | F | | | 1927-11-18 | Webster, South Dakota |
| 32 | (United States) | Dan McKinnon | Sophomore | F | 6' 1" (1.85 m) | 209 lb (95 kg) | 1922-04-21 | Williams, Minnesota |
| 37 | (United States) | Bob Grina | Junior | F | | | 1926-08-09 | Grand Forks, North Dakota |

== Standings ==
1947–48 NCAA Independent ice hockey standings
| | Intercollegiate | | | | | | | Overall | | | | | |
| | GP | W | L | T | Pct. | GF | GA | GP | W | L | T | GF | GA |
|---|---|---|---|---|---|---|---|---|---|---|---|---|---|
| Army | 16 | 11 | 4 | 1 | .719 | 78 | 39 | 16 | 11 | 4 | 1 | 78 | 39 |
| Bemidji State | 5 | 0 | 5 | 0 | .000 | 13 | 36 | 10 | 2 | 8 | 0 | 37 | 63 |
| Boston College | 19 | 14 | 5 | 0 | .737 | 126 | 60 | 19 | 14 | 5 | 0 | 126 | 60 |
| Boston University | 24 | 20 | 4 | 0 | .833 | 179 | 86 | 24 | 20 | 4 | 0 | 179 | 86 |
| Bowdoin | 9 | 4 | 5 | 0 | .444 | 45 | 68 | 11 | 6 | 5 | 0 | 56 | 73 |
| Brown | 14 | 5 | 9 | 0 | .357 | 61 | 91 | 14 | 5 | 9 | 0 | 61 | 91 |
| California | 10 | 2 | 8 | 0 | .200 | 45 | 67 | 18 | 6 | 12 | 0 | 94 | 106 |
| Clarkson | 12 | 5 | 6 | 1 | .458 | 67 | 39 | 17 | 10 | 6 | 1 | 96 | 54 |
| Colby | 8 | 2 | 6 | 0 | .250 | 28 | 41 | 8 | 2 | 6 | 0 | 28 | 41 |
| Colgate | 10 | 7 | 3 | 0 | .700 | 54 | 34 | 13 | 10 | 3 | 0 | 83 | 45 |
| Colorado College | 14 | 9 | 5 | 0 | .643 | 84 | 73 | 27 | 19 | 8 | 0 | 207 | 120 |
| Cornell | 4 | 0 | 4 | 0 | .000 | 3 | 43 | 4 | 0 | 4 | 0 | 3 | 43 |
| Dartmouth | 23 | 21 | 2 | 0 | .913 | 156 | 76 | 24 | 21 | 3 | 0 | 156 | 81 |
| Fort Devens State | 13 | 3 | 10 | 0 | .231 | 33 | 74 | – | – | – | – | – | – |
| Georgetown | 3 | 2 | 1 | 0 | .667 | 12 | 11 | 7 | 5 | 2 | 0 | 37 | 21 |
| Hamilton | – | – | – | – | – | – | – | 14 | 7 | 7 | 0 | – | – |
| Harvard | 22 | 9 | 13 | 0 | .409 | 131 | 131 | 23 | 9 | 14 | 0 | 135 | 140 |
| Lehigh | 9 | 0 | 9 | 0 | .000 | 10 | 100 | 11 | 0 | 11 | 0 | 14 | 113 |
| Massachusetts | 2 | 0 | 2 | 0 | .000 | 1 | 23 | 3 | 0 | 3 | 0 | 3 | 30 |
| Michigan | 18 | 16 | 2 | 0 | .889 | 105 | 53 | 23 | 20 | 2 | 1 | 141 | 63 |
| Michigan Tech | 19 | 7 | 12 | 0 | .368 | 87 | 96 | 20 | 8 | 12 | 0 | 91 | 97 |
| Middlebury | 14 | 8 | 5 | 1 | .607 | 111 | 68 | 16 | 10 | 5 | 1 | 127 | 74 |
| Minnesota | 16 | 9 | 7 | 0 | .563 | 78 | 73 | 21 | 9 | 12 | 0 | 100 | 105 |
| Minnesota–Duluth | 6 | 3 | 3 | 0 | .500 | 21 | 24 | 9 | 6 | 3 | 0 | 36 | 28 |
| MIT | 19 | 8 | 11 | 0 | .421 | 93 | 114 | 19 | 8 | 11 | 0 | 93 | 114 |
| New Hampshire | 13 | 4 | 9 | 0 | .308 | 58 | 67 | 13 | 4 | 9 | 0 | 58 | 67 |
| North Dakota | 10 | 6 | 4 | 0 | .600 | 51 | 46 | 16 | 11 | 5 | 0 | 103 | 68 |
| North Dakota Agricultural | 8 | 5 | 3 | 0 | .571 | 43 | 33 | 8 | 5 | 3 | 0 | 43 | 33 |
| Northeastern | 19 | 10 | 9 | 0 | .526 | 135 | 119 | 19 | 10 | 9 | 0 | 135 | 119 |
| Norwich | 9 | 3 | 6 | 0 | .333 | 38 | 58 | 13 | 6 | 7 | 0 | 56 | 70 |
| Princeton | 18 | 8 | 10 | 0 | .444 | 65 | 72 | 21 | 10 | 11 | 0 | 79 | 79 |
| St. Cloud State | 12 | 10 | 2 | 0 | .833 | 55 | 35 | 16 | 12 | 4 | 0 | 73 | 55 |
| St. Lawrence | 9 | 6 | 3 | 0 | .667 | 65 | 27 | 13 | 8 | 4 | 1 | 95 | 50 |
| Suffolk | – | – | – | – | – | – | – | – | – | – | – | – | – |
| Tufts | 4 | 3 | 1 | 0 | .750 | 17 | 15 | 4 | 3 | 1 | 0 | 17 | 15 |
| Union | 9 | 1 | 8 | 0 | .111 | 7 | 86 | 9 | 1 | 8 | 0 | 7 | 86 |
| Williams | 11 | 3 | 6 | 2 | .364 | 37 | 47 | 13 | 4 | 7 | 2 | – | – |
| Yale | 16 | 5 | 10 | 1 | .344 | 60 | 69 | 20 | 8 | 11 | 1 | 89 | 85 |

== Schedule and results ==
| Date | Opponent | Site | Result | Record |
Regular Season
| December 10 | Grand Forks Amerks* | Winter Sports Building • Grand Forks, North Dakota | W 8–0 | 1–0–0 |
| December 17 | at Thief River Falls Thieves* | Thief River Falls, Minnesota | W 6–4 | 2–0–0 |
| December 20 | at Thief River Falls Thieves* | Thief River Falls, Minnesota | L 1–3 | 2–1–0 |
| January 5 | Thief River Falls Thieves* | Winter Sports Building • Grand Forks, North Dakota | W 7–4 | 3–1–0 |
| January 9 | at Michigan* | Weinberg Coliseum • Ann Arbor, Michigan | W 6–5 | 4–1–0 |
| January 10 | at Michigan* | Weinberg Coliseum • Ann Arbor, Michigan | L 2–5 | 4–2–0 |
| January 16 | Michigan Tech* | Winter Sports Building • Grand Forks, North Dakota | L 6–7 ^{OT} | 4–3–0 |
| January 17 | Michigan Tech* | Winter Sports Building • Grand Forks, North Dakota | W 7–3 | 5–3–0 |
| January 23 | Minnesota* | Winter Sports Building • Grand Forks, North Dakota | W 5–3 | 6–3–0 |
| January 24 | Minnesota* | Winter Sports Building • Grand Forks, North Dakota | L 4–7 ^{OT} | 6–4–0 |
| February 10 | at Wichita Flyers* | Wichita, Kansas | W 13–5 | 7–4–0 |
| February 12 | at Colorado College* | Broadmoor Ice Palace • Colorado Springs, Colorado | W 8–4 | 8–4–0 |
| February 13 | at Colorado College* | Broadmoor Ice Palace • Colorado Springs, Colorado | L 3–6 | 8–5–0 |
| February 20 | at Michigan Tech* | Dee Stadium • Houghton, Michigan | W 5–4 | 9–5–0 |
| February 21 | at Michigan Tech* | Dee Stadium • Houghton, Michigan | W 5–2 | 10–5–0 |
| February 27 | at North Dakota Agricultural* | Winter Sports Building • Grand Forks, North Dakota | W 17–8 | 11–5–0 |
*Non-conference game.

== Scoring statistics ==
| Name | Position | Games | Goals | Assists | Points | PIM |
|---|---|---|---|---|---|---|
| Bill Sullivan | F | 16 | 18 | 6 | 24 | 4 |
| Gordon Christian | F | 15 | 12 | 12 | 24 | 12 |
| Jim Medved | F | 16 | 14 | 9 | 23 | 6 |
| Prince Johnson | F | 16 | 14 | 6 | 20 | 8 |
| John Noah | D | 16 | 13 | 3 | 16 | 6 |
| Buzz Johnson | F | 15 | 8 | 8 | 16 | 8 |
| Wes Cole | F | 16 | 8 | 6 | 14 | 6 |
| Paul McKinnon | F | 15 | 5 | 2 | 7 | 8 |
| Joe Silovich | D | 16 | 3 | 2 | 5 | 39 |
| Bob Krumholz | F | 12 | 3 | 2 | 5 | 4 |
| Dan McKinnon | D | 16 | 2 | 1 | 3 | 6 |
| Ted Wilson | F | 6 | 2 | 1 | 3 | 0 |
| Jim Doyle | D/F | 11 | 1 | 2 | 3 | 2 |
| Cal Marvin | D | 10 | 0 | 1 | 1 | 2 |
| Tom Buran | F | 4 | 0 | 1 | 1 | 0 |
| Bob Dorscher | D | 8 | 0 | 0 | 0 | 2 |
| Jim Williams | D | 3 | 0 | 0 | 0 | 4 |
| Bob Murray | G | - | 0 | 0 | 0 | 0 |
| Art Forman | G | - | 0 | 0 | 0 | 0 |
| Total | | | 103 | 62 | 185 | 117 |

== Goaltending statistics ==
| Name | Games | Minutes | Wins | Losses | Ties | Goals Against | Saves | Shut Outs | SV % | GAA |
|---|---|---|---|---|---|---|---|---|---|---|
| Bob Murray | - | - | - | - | - | - | - | - | .894 | 4.07 |
| Art Forman | - | - | - | - | - | - | - | - | .840 | 5.50 |
| Total | 16 | - | - | - | - | - | - | 0 | .888 | 4.25 |
