= 1947–48 Boston College Eagles men's ice hockey season =

NEIHL Tournament, Champion NCAA Tournament, Semifinal
- Conference: 2nd NEIHL
- Home ice: Boston Arena

Record
- Overall: 14–5–0
- Conference: 9–1–0
- Home: 5–0–0
- Road: 1–2–0
- Neutral: 8–3–0

Coaches and captains
- Head coach: John "Snooks" Kelley
- Captain(s): John Corcoran; Bob Mason

The 1947–48 Boston College Eagles men's ice hockey season was the 26th season of play for the program but first under the oversight of the NCAA. The Eagles represent Boston College and were coached by John "Snooks" Kelley, in his 12th season.

== Season ==
With the NCAA instituting a college hockey tournament for the first time, BC had high hopes of being one of the two eastern teams invited to participate. Unfortunately, the Eagles had to contend with the absence of several key players early in the season. Star center Warren Lewis came down with an illness before the first game was played and was out of the lineup for their opening game against cross-town rival Harvard. His scoring touch was missed as BC fell to the Crimson 3–4. After two less-than-comfortable wins over Fort Devens State and MIT, the team lost their top two defensemen when Butch Songin and John Gallagher were injured in a car accident just before Christmas. However, by that time Warren Lewis had recovered and was back in the lineup. Filling in for the missing players were new additions Frank Shellenback and Ed Clasby but they could not make up for the missing defensive prowess.

Over the succeeding five weeks, BC posted a mediocre 3–3 record and surrendered an average of 5 goals per game. It was only though the exploits of Mason, Lewis and Corcoran that allowed BC to remain in contention for the national tournament. Their biggest game during that stretch was against perennial powerhouse Dartmouth when they handed the Indians their first loss of the season. Songin returned just in time for the match against the green and was vital in keeping the high-powered Indians away from Bernie Burke and the BC cage. The reprieve was short-lived, however, as Songin missed several of the following games.

The three-game losing skid had BC in a precarious position, however, Ed Songin returned healthy in time for the game against New Hampshire, rejoining the team along with Gallagher. The result was an overwhelming victory over the Wildcats which began a streak of dominating play that would last until the end of the regular season. After slicing through the Georgetown Hoyas, BC shutout Fort Devens State in the rematch with both Burke and backup Norm Dailey getting a turn in the crease.

BC ended the regular season with revenge wins over Harvard and Boston University in overwhelming fashion. In doing so they finished second in the NEIHL and appeared in the conference's first postseason tournament. They met Bowdoin in the Semifinal and eviscerated the Polar Bears 10–1 with a total team effort. In the championship game BC faced off against Northeastern, who had upset the top-seeded Terriers. The Eagles relied heavily on Burke to keep them in the game and their BC netminder faced a withering array of shots. He was up to the task and BC entered the third down just a goal. After the Huskies increased their lead to 2, BC rallied to score four consecutive goals in just over 6 minutes of game time to capture the championship.

The title, along with their stellar overall record, enabled BC to earn the second eastern bid for the inaugural NCAA tournament. They travelled to Colorado Springs and faced a powerful Michigan squad. The two teams proved to be the equal of one another as BC got three separate 1-goal leads only to see Michigan tie the score each time. The Wolverines earned their first lead of the match in the third period and jealously held on to the advantage as time ticked away. With under a minute to play, and Burke sitting on the bench in favor of a sixth skater, Jim Fitzgerald tied the game and sent the match into overtime. The NCAA rules at the time followed the original college hockey format that allowed for all 20 minutes of an overtime period to be played regardless of how many goals were scored. This meant that when Wally Gacek scored just 18 seconds into the extra period, BC still had a chance to win the game. Unfortunately, the Wolverines played a stingy defensive game for the rest of the contest and the Eagles were unable to tie the game. Instead, Gacek added a second marker with 30 seconds left in the 4th period, leaving the final score 4–6 in favor of Michigan. Because the NCAA changed the rules afterwards to mirror the more modern sudden-death rules, this was the only game in NCAA tournament history where more than one overtime goal was scored.

== Roster ==
No.	Nat.	Player	Class	Pos	Height	Weight	DoB	Hometown	Previous team
		Bernard M. Burke Jr.	Sophomore	G			1925-05-27	Newton, Massachusetts
		Edward M. Clasby	Sophomore	F				Natick, Massachusetts
		John E. Corcoran (C)	Senior	F				Newton, Massachusetts
		Norman F. Dailey	Sophomore	G				Lexington, Massachusetts
		Walter F. DeLorey	Sophomore	F			1924-10-09	Watertown, Massachusetts
		William H. Dowd	Senior	F				Stoneham, Massachusetts
		Walter A. Falvey Jr.	Freshman					Belmont, Massachusetts
		James W. Fitzgerald	Junior	F				Cambridge, Massachusetts
		John E. Gallagher	Sophomore	D				Brighton, Massachusetts
		Vincent Harding		D
		E. Paul Kelley	Junior	F				Dorchester, Massachusetts
		Jerome M. Leonard	Junior	F				Jamaica Plain, Massachusetts
		G. Warren Lewis	Sophomore	F				Arlington, Massachusetts
		John G. Mahler Jr.	Freshman	F				Belmont, Massachusetts
		Robert T. Mason (C)	Senior	F				Wollaston, Massachusetts
		Joseph P. McCusker	Sophomore	D				Waltham, Massachusetts
		John J. McIntyre	Sophomore	F			1925-01-10	Medford, Massachusetts
		John P. McMahon	Junior	F				Lynn, Massachusetts
		Frank V. Shellenback Jr.	Freshman	D			1927-06-24	Newton, Massachusetts
		Edward F. Songin	Sophomore	D	6' 2" (1.88 m)	190 lb (86 kg)	1924-05-11	Walpole, Massachusetts
		William J. Talbot	Sophomore	F				Belmont, Massachusetts
		Giles E. Threadgold	Freshman	F				Auburndale, Massachusetts

Note: Boston College did not use numbers on their jerseys at this time.
Note: Clasby, Dowd, Falvey and Shellenback are listed as being members of the team for at least part of the season, however, it's unclear whether any of the four played in any games.

== Standings ==
1947–48 NCAA Independent ice hockey standings
	Intercollegiate							Overall					
	GP	W	L	T	Pct.	GF	GA	GP	W	L	T	GF	GA
Army	16	11	4	1	.719	78	39	16	11	4	1	78	39
Bemidji State	5	0	5	0	.000	13	36	10	2	8	0	37	63
Boston College	19	14	5	0	.737	126	60	19	14	5	0	126	60
Boston University	24	20	4	0	.833	179	86	24	20	4	0	179	86
Bowdoin	9	4	5	0	.444	45	68	11	6	5	0	56	73
Brown	14	5	9	0	.357	61	91	14	5	9	0	61	91
California	10	2	8	0	.200	45	67	18	6	12	0	94	106
Clarkson	12	5	6	1	.458	67	39	17	10	6	1	96	54
Colby	8	2	6	0	.250	28	41	8	2	6	0	28	41
Colgate	10	7	3	0	.700	54	34	13	10	3	0	83	45
Colorado College	14	9	5	0	.643	84	73	27	19	8	0	207	120
Cornell	4	0	4	0	.000	3	43	4	0	4	0	3	43
Dartmouth	23	21	2	0	.913	156	76	24	21	3	0	156	81
Fort Devens State	13	3	10	0	.231	33	74	–	–	–	–	–	–
Georgetown	3	2	1	0	.667	12	11	7	5	2	0	37	21
Hamilton	–	–	–	–	–	–	–	14	7	7	0	–	–
Harvard	22	9	13	0	.409	131	131	23	9	14	0	135	140
Lehigh	9	0	9	0	.000	10	100	11	0	11	0	14	113
Massachusetts	2	0	2	0	.000	1	23	3	0	3	0	3	30
Michigan	18	16	2	0	.889	105	53	23	20	2	1	141	63
Michigan Tech	19	7	12	0	.368	87	96	20	8	12	0	91	97
Middlebury	14	8	5	1	.607	111	68	16	10	5	1	127	74
Minnesota	16	9	7	0	.563	78	73	21	9	12	0	100	105
Minnesota–Duluth	6	3	3	0	.500	21	24	9	6	3	0	36	28
MIT	19	8	11	0	.421	93	114	19	8	11	0	93	114
New Hampshire	13	4	9	0	.308	58	67	13	4	9	0	58	67
North Dakota	10	6	4	0	.600	51	46	16	11	5	0	103	68
North Dakota Agricultural	8	5	3	0	.571	43	33	8	5	3	0	43	33
Northeastern	19	10	9	0	.526	135	119	19	10	9	0	135	119
Norwich	9	3	6	0	.333	38	58	13	6	7	0	56	70
Princeton	18	8	10	0	.444	65	72	21	10	11	0	79	79
St. Cloud State	12	10	2	0	.833	55	35	16	12	4	0	73	55
St. Lawrence	9	6	3	0	.667	65	27	13	8	4	1	95	50
Suffolk	–	–	–	–	–	–	–	–	–	–	–	–	–
Tufts	4	3	1	0	.750	17	15	4	3	1	0	17	15
Union	9	1	8	0	.111	7	86	9	1	8	0	7	86
Williams	11	3	6	2	.364	37	47	13	4	7	2	–	–
Yale	16	5	10	1	.344	60	69	20	8	11	1	89	85

1947–48 New England Intercollegiate Hockey League standings
	Conference							Overall					
	GP	W	L	T	PTS	GF	GA	GP	W	L	T	GF	GA
Boston University †	13	12	1	0	.923	86	40	24	20	4	0	179	86
Boston College *	10	9	1	0	.900	77	29	19	14	5	0	126	60
Northeastern	14	8	6	0	.571	108	79	19	10	9	0	135	119
Bowdoin	6	3	3	0	.500	32	38	11	6	5	0	56	73
MIT	14	5	9	0	.357	62	87	19	8	11	0	93	114
Middlebury	6	2	4	0	.333	27	48	16	10	5	1	127	74
New Hampshire	10	3	7	0	.300	42	56	13	4	9	0	58	67
Norwich	7	2	5	0	.286	25	50	13	6	7	0	56	70
Fort Devens State	11	3	8	0	.273	30	55	–	–	–	–	–	–
Colby	5	1	4	0	.200	17	27	8	2	6	0	28	41
† indicates conference champion * indicates conference tournament champion

== Schedule and results ==
Date	Opponent	Site	Result	Record
Regular Season
December 3	vs. Harvard*	Boston Arena • Boston, Massachusetts	L 3–4	0–1–0
December 15	Fort Devens State	Boston Arena • Boston, Massachusetts	W 4–2	1–1–0 (1–0–0)
December 22	vs. MIT	Boston Arena • Boston, Massachusetts	W 6–4	2–1–0 (2–0–0)
January 5	vs. Northeastern	Boston Arena • Boston, Massachusetts	W 7–6	3–1–0 (3–0–0)
January 12	Dartmouth*	Boston Arena • Boston, Massachusetts	W 4–3	4–1–0
January 27	vs. Northeastern	Boston Arena • Boston, Massachusetts	W 8–5	5–1–0 (4–0–0)
January 29	at Dartmouth*	Davis Rink • Hanover, New Hampshire	L 4–6	5–2–0
February 3	vs. Boston University	Boston Arena • Boston, Massachusetts	L 3–5	5–3–0 (4–1–0)
February 10	at Princeton*	Hobey Baker Memorial Rink • Princeton, New Jersey	L 4–5	5–4–0
February 16	New Hampshire	Boston Arena • Boston, Massachusetts	W 9–2	6–4–0 (5–1–0)
February 20	vs. Georgetown*	Crystal Ice Palace • Norwalk, Connecticut	W 8–1	7–4–0
February 23	at Fort Devens State	Skating Club of Boston Rink • Allston, Massachusetts	W 7–0	8–4–0 (6–1–0)
February 25	vs. Harvard*	Boston Arena • Boston, Massachusetts	W 6–1	9–4–0
February 27	vs. MIT	Boston Arena • Boston, Massachusetts	W 9–2	10–4–0 (7–1–0)
March 1	Middlebury	Boston Arena • Boston, Massachusetts	W 15–1	11–4–0 (8–1–0)
March 3	vs. Boston University	Boston Arena • Boston, Massachusetts	W 9–2	12–4–0 (9–1–0)
NEIHL Tournament
March 8	Bowdoin*	Boston Arena • Boston, Massachusetts (NEIHL Semifinal)	W 10–1	13–4–0
March 9	vs. Northeastern*	Boston Arena • Boston, Massachusetts (NEIHL Championship)	W 6–4	14–4–0
NCAA Tournament
March 19	vs. Michigan*	Broadmoor Ice Palace • Colorado Springs, Colorado (NCAA Semifinal)	L 4–6 ^{OT}	14–5–0
*Non-conference game.

Note: The NCAA had not yet instituted sudden death overtime, allowing more than one goal to be scored during the full extra period.

== Scoring statistics ==
Name	Position	Games	Goals	Assists	Points	PIM
Bob Mason	C	-	21	19	40	-
John McIntyre	C/RW	-	15	18	33	-
Warren Lewis	C/LW	-	16	16	32	-
Joe McCusker	D	-	13	12	25	-
Jim Fitzgerald	F	-	9	16	25	-
John Corcoran	LW/RW	-	11	12	23	-
Giles Threadgold	RW	-	10	11	21	-
Butch Songin	D	-	9	7	16	-
Paul Kelley	F	-	8	5	13	-
John Gallagher	D	-	5	6	11	-
John Mahler	LW	-	2	4	6	-
Walt DeLorey	F	-	3	0	3	-
Bill Talbot	F	-	0	2	2	-
John McMahon	D	-	1	0	1	-
Jerry Leonard	F	-	0	1	1	-
Vern Harding	D	-	0	1	1	-
Bernie Burke	G	-	0	0	0	-
Norm Dailey	G	-	0	0	0	-
Total			123	130	253	-

Note: 3 goals are unaccounted for. Additionally, the assist total is likely incomplete.

== Goaltending statistics ==
Name	Games	Minutes	Wins	Losses	Ties	Goals Against	Saves	Shut Outs	SV %	GAA
Bernie Burke	19					56		0		
Norm Dailey	6					4		0		
Total	19	1160	14	5	0	60		1		3.10

Note: Burke and Dailey shared the shutout on February 23.

== Awards and honors ==
Player	Award	Ref
Butch Songin	AHCA First Team All-American	
Bernie Burke	AHCA Second Team All-American	
Bernie Burke	NCAA All-Tournament First Team	
Butch Songin	NCAA All-Tournament Second Team	
