= KKAQ =

Coordinates: 48°07′25″N 96°08′31″W

- Thief River Falls, Minnesota; United States
- Frequency: 1460 kHz
- Branding: 1460 Real Country

Programming
- Format: Classic country
- Affiliations: ABC News Radio; Minnesota Wild

Ownership
- Owner: Iowa City Broadcasting Company, Inc.
- Sister stations: KKDQ, KTRF, KTRF-FM

History
- First air date: 1979

Technical information
- Licensing authority: FCC
- Facility ID: 3244
- Class: D
- Power: 2,500 watts day; 150 watts night
- Translator: 98.5 K253CL (Thief River Falls)

Links
- Public license information: Public file; LMS
- Webcast: Listen Live
- Website: trfradio.com

KKAQ (1460 AM) is a radio station licensed to Thief River Falls, Minnesota. The station broadcasts a classic country format and part of the Ingstad Minnesota Radio Network.

Logo before translator sign on
