= KTRF =

KTRF may refer to:

- KTRF (AM), a radio station (1230 AM) licensed to serve Thief River Falls, Minnesota, United States
- KTRF-FM, a radio station (94.1 FM) licensed to serve Red Lake Falls, Minnesota
