= Paragon Innovations =

Engineering firm based in Richardson, Texas, US

- Company type: Public
- Industry: Engineering
- Founded: 1990
- Founder: Mike Wilkinson (GM & VP)
- Fate: Acquired by TTI, Inc.
- Headquarters: Richardson, Texas, USA
- Key people: Sandy Wilkinson, (CFO retired); Mike Willey, (VP); Allan Rich, (Director of Operations)
- Services: Electrical engineering Embedded system design Mechanical engineering and industrial design Business incubator
- Website: ParagonInnovations.com

Paragon Innovations is an engineering firm based in Richardson, Texas, that provides product development services for clients across the USA. Since its founding in 1990, Paragon has expanded significantly to become one of the fastest-growing engineering firms in Texas.

In August 2021, Paragon Innovations was acquired by TTI, Inc., Berkshire Hathaway company for an undisclosed amount.

== Services ==
- Electrical engineering
- Embedded system design
- Mechanical engineering and industrial design
- Business incubator

Paragon has developed products for a wide range of industries, with specialization in:

- Medical devices
- Video / Camera technology
- All things IoT
- Portable wireless devices

== Notable Projects ==
Notable Paragon Innovations projects include:

- A video display controller for a first-of-its-kind flat-screen presentation system for 3M
- An airport video docking system that provides precise guidance information for pilots during the docking process for Siemens
- An automated infusion pump that reduces IV medication errors and provides increased safety for patients for B. Braun
- A transmission system for drilling data for Advantage R&D
- The next-generation Ignition Interlock, a handheld device that is connected to ignitions of cars of repeat drunk-driving offenders, for Smart Start
- A small, lightweight device that can control and monitor the temperature of medications over several days for Kewl Innovations

== Relationship with Texas A&M University ==
Paragon Innovations is an Aggie-owned business, and many of the firm's employees graduated from Texas A&M University. Paragon Innovations sponsors several events hosted by Texas A&M, including:

- the Annual Ideas Challenge, a campus-wide competition in which students submit their ideas for a new product or service.
- the annual MBA Tech Transfer Challenge, hosted by the McFerrin Center for Entrepreneurship (formerly the Center for New Ventures and Entrepreneurship) at the Texas A&M Mays Business School. The annual competition asks teams of MBA students to assess the commercial viability of an A&M invention.
- the Senior Capstone Experience at Texas A&M Electronic Systems Engineering Technology department. Paragon provides a $10,000 grant that helps undergrad students in this two-course sequence, during which they plan, execute, and control the design and development of a demonstrable prototype device/system suitable for commercialization.
- McFerrin Center for Entrepreneurship events.

Mike Willey, VP also is a Sr. Lecturer at Texas A&M University in the College of Engineering. He teaches Real Time Operating Systems (RTOS) and Capstone classes.

Mike Wilkinson, GM & VP, regularly guest lectures in the TAMU College of Engineering and the Mays Business School. He sits on various industry committees including, the ESET IAC, McFerrin Center for Entrepreneurship Advisory Council, and the Texas A&M College of Education and Human Development STEM board.

== Recognition ==
- Paragon has been granted the Aggie 100 award, which identifies, recognizes and celebrates the 100 fastest-growing Aggie-owned or Aggie-led businesses in the world. Paragon received the award in 2005, 2006, and 2010.
- Paragon was twice recognized by the Dallas Business Journal on its Fast Tech 50 list.
- Paragon was recognized by SMU Cox School of Business as the 86th fastest growing business on its Dallas 100 list.
