= Vivitek Qumi =

The Qumi (DPC74A1) is a pocket projector manufactured by Delta Electronics for Vivitek. It was released in May 2011.

== Description ==
The Qumi is a portable, 3D, LED-powered projector based on Texas Instruments' 3D-Ready DLP Pico HD chipset and Luminus's Phlatlight PT-39 LED light. Its native resolution is 1280×800, and it is able to project up to 1920×1080. The projector has a built-in microSD card slot and a remote control for the built-in media player.

It weighs 617 grams, and consumes 53/17 watts in normal/eco mode. It has a phlatlight-based LED light source rated for an estimated 30,000 hours of operation. Its brightness is 300 lumens, and at 60" diagonal image measurement was 198 lumens.

Qumi has only HDMI 1.3, it is not HDCP compliant for 3D playback, 3D works only with PC via HDMI and analog VGA port, with DLP Link and IR glasses, in 800×600, 1024×768, 1280×720 (VGA only), at any 120Hz capable graphics card.

== Supported resolutions ==
The Qumi can accept an input resolution up to:

- 1920×1080 at 60Hz, when using HDMI
- 1600×1200 at 60Hz when using VGA

== Critiques ==
Users reported some issues with the Qumi. The unit requires between 5 and 15 minutes to focus at warm-up, this is because the new generation LED based portables have plastic lenses. One can use a generic AV cable by reversing the RED and YELLOW inputs. RED is video on the Qumi, not the industry standard YELLOW. The built-in speaker is quiet, and the 3D has been described as usable only in the dark. Some customers have reported chromatic aberration issues. In 3D mode 1280×720 at 120Hz, the picture is blurred.
