= Arctic Cat M800 =

Snowmobile

The Arctic Cat M8000 is the new name for the Arctic Cat M8 snowmobile. It is powered by a 794 cc liquid-cooled two-stroke engine. This engine turns a continuous track, the biggest of which measures 162 inches long x 15 inches wide x 2.6 inch lug. This model is known as a Sno-Pro. The cost for a Sno-Pro 162-inch track M800 is just under US$13,000. There are also options for a shorter, 153-inch track, or even shorter tracks for those who use their sled strictly on trails.
