= 1948–49 American International Aces men's ice hockey season =

- Home ice: Big E Coliseum

Record
- Overall: 4–3–0
- Home: 11–7–1
- Road: 9–9–0
- Neutral: 3–1–0

Coaches and captains
- Head coach: William Turner
- Captain: William Turner

The 1948–49 American International Aces men's ice hockey season was the inaugural season of play for the program. The Aces represented American International College and were coached by William Turner, who also served as team captain.

== Season ==
AIC's first ice hockey team was organized and arranged at the behest of senior William Turner. The club was able to not only secure seven opponents for the season but managed to also use the Big E Coliseum for their home games rather than have to rely on frozen ponds. The Aces played well in their first season, finishing with a winning record. More impressive, however, was that their three losses on the year were to two of the strongest teams in college hockey, BU and eventual National Champion, BC.

Dick Kearns served as team manager with Ray Guilmentte as his assistant.

== Roster ==
No.	Nat.	Player	Class	Pos	Height	Weight	DoB	Hometown	Previous team
00		Joe Percy		G
21		Ray Fredricks
22		Jim Kelly
23		Howie Tompson
24		Bob Clason	Junior
25		Tom Smith	Senior
27		Fred Zanetti	Junior					Springfield, Massachusetts
29		Bonde Johnson
31		Bob Boulrice	Junior
32		Dick Lamothe	Junior
33		Bob Mister
35		William Turner (C)	Senior
36		Flem Cochi
37		Joe Bucholtz
83		Andy Poggi
		Frank Fermanti

== Standings ==
1948–49 NCAA Independent ice hockey standings
	Intercollegiate							Overall					
	GP	W	L	T	Pct.	GF	GA	GP	W	L	T	GF	GA
American International	7	4	3	0	.571	37	39	7	4	3	0	37	39
Army	14	7	7	0	.500	52	59	15	8	7	0	58	63
Boston College	20	19	1	0	.950	134	64	22	21	1	0	164	67
Boston University	20	13	7	0	.650	147	77	20	13	7	0	147	77
Bowdoin	–	–	–	–	–	–	–	12	4	8	0	–	–
Brown	–	–	–	–	–	–	–	14	7	7	0	58	62
California	–	–	–	–	–	–	–	–	–	–	–	–	–
Clarkson	–	–	–	–	–	–	–	13	8	5	0	69	59
Colby	–	–	–	–	–	–	–	–	–	–	–	–	–
Colgate	–	–	–	–	–	–	–	9	5	3	1	53	38
Colorado College	–	–	–	–	–	–	–	24	15	7	1	153	99
Dartmouth	–	–	–	–	–	–	–	23	17	6	0	148	72
Fort Devens State	–	–	–	–	–	–	–	–	–	–	–	–	–
Georgetown	–	–	–	–	–	–	–	–	–	–	–	–	–
Hamilton	–	–	–	–	–	–	–	10	1	9	0	–	–
Harvard	–	–	–	–	–	–	–	20	12	8	0	130	112
Lehigh	3	1	2	0	.333	7	16	6	2	4	0	18	48
Massachusetts	–	–	–	–	–	–	–	3	0	3	0	11	29
Michigan	–	–	–	–	–	–	–	25	20	2	3	179	74
Michigan Tech	–	–	–	–	–	–	–	15	5	10	0	66	76
Middlebury	–	–	–	–	–	–	–	10	6	4	0	–	–
Minnesota	–	–	–	–	–	–	–	22	11	11	0	120	101
Minnesota–Duluth	–	–	–	–	–	–	–	7	7	0	0	44	12
MIT	–	–	–	–	–	–	–	9	4	5	0	–	–
New Hampshire	–	–	–	–	–	–	–	3	0	3	0	11	23
North Dakota	–	–	–	–	–	–	–	22	9	12	1	109	148
North Dakota Agricultural	–	–	–	–	–	–	–	–	–	–	–	–	–
Northeastern	–	–	–	–	–	–	–	16	9	7	0	118	78
Princeton	–	–	–	–	–	–	–	20	6	13	1	60	110
Saint Michael's	–	–	–	–	–	–	–	4	0	4	0	23	38
St. Lawrence	–	–	–	–	–	–	–	7	5	2	0	41	29
Union	–	–	–	–	–	–	–	1	0	1	0	–	–
Williams	–	–	–	–	–	–	–	14	5	9	0	–	–
Wyoming	–	–	–	–	–	–	–	9	4	5	0	51	45
Yale	–	–	–	–	–	–	–	22	9	13	0	77	103

== Schedule and results ==
Date	Opponent	Site	Result	Record
Regular season
February 2	at Boston College*	Boston Arena • Boston, Massachusetts	L 2–10	
February 25	Boston College*	Big E Coliseum • West Springfield, Massachusetts	L 3–6	
? ^{†}	Boston University*	? • ?	L 5–10	
?	Devens State*	? • ?	W 4–3	
?	Suffolk*	? • ?	W 10–6	
?	Springfield*	? • ?	W 7–3	
?	Springfield*	? • ?	W 6–1	
*Non-conference game. ^{#}Rankings from USCHO.com Poll. All times are in Eastern Time. Source:

† BU does not record a game against AIC during the season.
