= Jack Mulhern =

Jack Mulhern may refer to:

- Jack Mulhern (ice hockey) (1927–2007), American ice hockey player
- Jack Mulhern (actor), American actor
