= Vic Stout =

Biographical details
- Born: August 18, 1908
- Died: June 17, 1969 (aged 60); Drexel Hill, Pennsylvania, U.S.

Playing career

Baseball
- 1929–32: Boston University

Administrative career (AD unless noted)
- 1946–49: Mass. State College–Fort Devens
- 1949–51: Boston University (Sports Info. Dir.)
- 1951–56: Boston University (Asst. AD)
- 1956–65: Boston University
- 1965–69: Boston University (Grad. Man. of Ath.)

R. Victor Stout (August 18, 1908 – June 17, 1969) was an American administrator who served as athletic director at Boston University from 1956 to 1965.

Stout was a standout athlete at Newton High School and played baseball at Boston University. He graduated from BU in 1932.

Stout spent nine years as a sports and news writer for the Boston Evening Traveller. In 1942, he joined the United States Army. He was the public relations and athletic officer at Fort Devens until 1945, when he was placed on active duty in the Pacific. In 1946 he became the director of athletics and physical education at Massachusetts State College–Fort Devens.

In 1949, Stout returned to Boston University as sports information director. He was given the additional job of assistant athletic director in 1951. In 1956 he was promoted to athletic director after the resignation of Buff Donelli. He was the first BU alumnus to serve as the school's athletic director. In 1965, the school's athletic department was consolidated with the physical education and recreation department and Stout was reassigned to the position of graduate manager of athletics, which he held until his death on June 17, 1969.
