= Ronald Stordahl =

American businessman

Ronald Arthur Stordahl
- Born: November 9, 1943 (age 82); Roseau, Minnesota
- Education: University of Minnesota
- Known for: Digi-Key
- Call sign: AE5E

Ronald Arthur Stordahl (born November 9, 1943) is the founder of electronic component distributor Digi-Key Electronics, located in Thief River Falls, Minnesota. He previously served as chief executive officer but is now member of the board.

== Early life ==
Ronald was born in Roseau, Minnesota to Arthur Vernon (1909–2011) and Ina (Olson) Stordahl (1922–2020) in 1943. His paternal grandfather, Louis, was an immigrant from Flesberg, Buskerud, Norway.

== Career ==
Stordahl's interest in ham radio provided the springboard for what became Digi-Key Electronics. While in college he assembled and began selling an electronic keyer kit, called the Digi-Keyer, for sending radiotelegraph code for ham radio operators.

After obtaining his PhD in electrical engineering from the University of Minnesota, Stordahl returned to his hometown of Thief River Falls. The keyer kit was discontinued and he began selling electronic components in 1972.

Digi-Key Electronics has become one of the fastest growing electronic component distributors in the world. The privately held company has annual sales of over $3 billion and employs over 5,000 people.

Stordahl holds the amateur radio callsign AE5E.
