= Electronic Products =

American trade magazine

Electronic Products Magazine
- Cover of the September–October 2024 issue
- Editor: Gina Roos
- Categories: Trade magazine
- Frequency: Monthly
- Founded: 1957
- Company: AspenCore Media
- Country: United States
- Based in: Centennial, Colorado
- Language: English
- Website: electronicproducts.com
- ISSN: 0013-4953

Electronic Products, also known as Electronic Products Magazine, is an electronic component and technology trade magazine serving the electronic design community. The magazine was launched in 1957 based in Garden City, New York.

== History and profile ==
Electronic Products was founded in 1957. The magazine was owned and published by Hearst Business Media until February 2015 when Arrow Electronics acquired the magazine and publishes it under AspenCore Media.

Electronic Products's editorial sections provide information on new products from the smallest capacitor to the brightest light-emitting diode (LED). In addition, featured articles range from selecting the best components to fill an application need to the latest in developing electronic technologies. The editorial content is rounded out with application-specific product sections and transcripts of discussion roundtables on subjects from military to medical electronics.

Since 1977, Electronic Products has offered the Product of the Year Awards.
