= John A. Yngve =

American lawyer and politician (1924–2019)

John Yngve

Member of the Minnesota House of Representatives
- In office 1963–1968

Personal details
- Born: John Anton Yngve; October 4, 1924 Thief River Falls, Minnesota, U.S.
- Died: May 21, 2019 (aged 94) Golden Valley, Minnesota, U.S.
- Party: Republican
- Education: University of Minnesota (LLB)

Military service
- Branch/service: United States Army
- Unit: United States Army Air Forces
- Battles/wars: World War II

John Anton Yngve (October 4, 1924 – May 21, 2019) was an American lawyer and politician.

== Early life and education ==
Yngve was born in Thief River Falls, Minnesota. He graduated from the St. Louis Park High School in St. Louis Park, Minnesota. He received his law degree from University of Minnesota in 1949.

== Career ==
Yngve served in the United States Army Air Forces during World War II. After graduating from law school, he established a legal practice in Plymouth, Minnesota. Yngve served on the Plymouth City Council and on the Plymouth Planning Commission from 1959 to 1962. He served in the Minnesota House of Representatives from 1963 to 1968 as a Republican. He served on the University of Minnesota Board of Regents from 1969 to 1975.

== Personal life ==
Yngve died in Golden Valley, Minnesota in 2019.
