= Elmer E. Berglund =

American politician and railroad employee

Elmer Eugene Berglund (January 1, 1924 – August 13, 2008) was an American politician and railroad employee.

Berglund was born in Thief River Falls, Pennington County, Minnesota. He graduated from Bemidji High School in Bemidji, Minnesota and went to University of Minnesota. Berglund served in the United States Army during World War II. He lived with his wife and family in Bemidji, Minnesota and worked for the Northern Pacific Railroad as a conductor and brakeman. Berglund served in the Minnesota House of Representatives from 1955 to 1960. He died in Truth or Consequences, New Mexico.
