= Joe McCusker =

American ice hockey player

- McCusker in 1950
- Born: November 12, 1927 Waltham, Massachusetts, USA
- Died: April 19, 2000 (aged 72)
- Position: Defenseman
- Played for: Boston College
- Playing career: 1946–1950
- Military career
- Burial place: Calvary Cemetery and Mausoleum
- Allegiance: United States
- Branch: United States Navy
- Service years: 1945
- Rank: Seaman recruit
- Other work
- Military career
- Branch: United States Army
- Service years: 1950–1951
- Rank: First lieutenant

Joseph P. McCusker was an American ice hockey defenseman who played for Boston College after World War II.

== Career ==
Immediately after graduating high school, Joe signed up with the United States Navy, receiving training in the summer of 1945. Before he could be stationed, however, the war ended with the surrender of Japan in August. Because it was too late by then to apply for college in 1945, McCusker deferred enrollment until the following year. When McCusker began attending Boston College in the fall of 1946, he joined the school's ice hockey team just in time for head coach John Kelley to return from his stint in the war. In his sophomore season the NCAA introduced a National Tournament for ice hockey and McCusker was one of the driving forces behind BC being invited to participate in the inaugural championship. The following year BC had high hopes to win the championship and produced one of the best seasons in college hockey history. McCusker, however, missed most of the season after starting with 7 points in 7 games. Boston College would go on to win the championship in 1949 and though he didn't play, McCusker was part of BC's first national championship.

McCusker returned with a vengeance for his senior season, pushing the Eagles to their third consecutive tournament appearance and being named an AHCA Second Team All-American Unfortunately, Boston College wasn't able to recapture the magic of 1949 and the team lost both games to finish 4th.

After graduating, McCusker enlisted in the military one more. This time he joined the United States Army and, because he possessed a college degree, he was commissioned as an officer. McCusker was deployed to Korea and served for a year, receiving a promotion to First lieutenant before being mustered out. After finishing his service, McCusker returned to Massachusetts and became teacher. He gave instruction in both English and History at Waltham High School and Waltham Vocational High School. After retiring, McCusker was inducted into the Boston College varsity hall of fame in 1994.

== Awards and honors ==
Award	Year
AHCA Second Team All-American	1949–50
