= DigiKey =

American electronic components distributor

- Trade name: DigiKey
- Type: Private
- Industry: Electronics distribution
- Founded: 1972
- Founder: Ronald Stordahl
- Headquarters: Thief River Falls, Minnesota, United States
- Area served: Worldwide
- Key people: Dave Doherty (President & COO); Mark Larson (President & COO, 1985–2015; General Manager, 1976–1985)
- Revenue: $3 billion (2018)
- Number of employees: >5,000
- Website: digikey.com

DigiKey (formerly written as Digi-Key) is an American electronic components distributor. The company was founded in 1972 by Ronald Stordahl. As of 2013, DigiKey is the fourth largest electronic component distributor in North America and the fifth largest electronic component distributor overall. Stordahl privately owns the company.

The name "Digi-Key" is a reference to the "Digi-Keyer Kit", a digital-electronic keyer kit that Stordahl developed and marketed to amateur radio enthusiasts. Electrical schematics for the electronic keyer were published in April 1968 by the radio publication QST. The part numbers, or SKUs, of its components typically end with "-ND".

== History ==
After earning a degree in electrical engineering at the University of Minnesota, Ronald Stordahl returned to his hometown of Thief River Falls, Minnesota, where he took up ham radio in the early 1970s. Stordahl created a kit of electronic parts to improve the transmission of Morse code over his radio. It was a keyer designed to generate time-uniform Morse code. He soon began selling kits to other ham operators. He bought too many components for his keyer, and since the keyer wasn't selling well, he began selling the components themselves by mail order. This branched off into the distribution of other electronic components, allowing customers to purchase parts in any quantity, no matter how small. The company quickly grew, and by 1984, it was located in a one million square foot facility next door to Arctic Cat, a snowmobile manufacturer.

In 1996, DigiKey launched its website, gradually shifting focus towards e-commerce. The first international domain was launched in 1996 in Canada. This would later expand to over 40 local domains.

DigiKey's logo used until 2023

Mark Larson, who joined DigiKey in 1976 as its general manager, became president in 1985. He has led the company from its initial focus on the hobbyist market to the expanded market it serves today. In 2015 Larson stepped down from his role within the company and transitioned to a board position. On June 1, 2015 Dave Doherty, who served as the Executive Vice President of Operations at Digi-Key, transitioned to Larson's position as President and Chief Operating Officer.

DigiKey continued to grow following the recession in 2008. By 2017, DigiKey was located in a single, centralized location in Thief River Falls, Minnesota that measured 800,000 square feet (74,000 m^{2}). In 2017 the company began work on a one million square foot expansion to their Thief River Falls facility at an expected cost of $200 million to $300 million. The expansion was helped by government incentives and tax exemptions and was expected to add another 1,000 jobs at Digi-Key.

By 2018, the company had annual revenue of $2.3 billion and more than 3,500 employees.

In March 2018, DigiKey announced an expansion for a 1 million square foot building with over 2.2 million square feet of usable space. This space will include receiving, shipping, warehouse, and storage space for the nearly 1.5 million products ready for immediate shipment. The building was officially opened on August 17, 2022.

On September 29, 2021, DigiKey announced a global distribution partnership with QuickLogic Corporation, a fabless semiconductor company.

In November 2022, DigiKey was granted their first patent for a 'tray for transporting and storing electronic components' (U.S. Patent No. USD968957S1).

During the summer of 2023, DigiKey celebrated their 50th anniversary, an event which was delayed the previous year due to the COVID-19 pandemic.

In April of 2025, Teri Ivaniszyn of Digi-Key says "I wake up in cold sweats about tariffs" when interviewed by NPR regarding the current tariff situation.

== See also ==
- E-commerce
- List of Minnesota companies
- Mouser Electronics
- Master Electronics
