= KTRF (AM) =

Coordinates: 48°07′47″N 96°11′11″W

- Thief River Falls, Minnesota; United States
- Broadcast area: Thief River Falls, Minnesota
- Frequency: 1230 kHz
- Branding: KTRF Radio 1230

Programming
- Format: Commercial; News/Talk
- Affiliations: Fox News Radio; Fox Sports Radio; Premiere Networks; Minnesota Timberwolves; Minnesota Twins; Minnesota Vikings

Ownership
- Owner: Tor Ingstad; (Iowa City Broadcasting Company)
- Sister stations: KKAQ, KKDQ, KTRF-FM

History
- First air date: March 1947
- Call sign meaning: Thief River Falls

Technical information
- Licensing authority: FCC
- Facility ID: 73627
- Class: C
- Power: 1,000 watts
- Translator: 93.3 K227DF (Thief River Falls)

Links
- Public license information: Public file; LMS
- Webcast: Listen Live
- Website: trfradio.com

KTRF (1230 kHz) is an AM radio station in Thief River Falls, Minnesota. The station is part of the Ingstad Minnesota Radio Network. KTRF reports local news, sports, weather, community information and obituaries. KTRF is part of Thief River Falls Radio, which also includes: KTRF-FM 94.1, KKAQ AM 1460, and KKDQ FM 99.3, Sjoberg's Cable Channel 3 and a weekday news letter publication - The Radio Gram.

KTRF covers local sports, Minnesota Twins baseball, and Minnesota Vikings football, and Minnesota Timberwolves basketball, as well as regional and high-school tournament play.

Local flavor is added with personality shows: The Good Morning Show with Bob Hultgren, Mid Mornings with Mark Allen, Team 1230 at noon, as well as the local news and local sports.

In the evening KTRF airs Fox Sports Radio, Coast to Coast AM, and other nationally syndicated programming.
