= Warren Lewis (ice hockey) =

American ice hockey player

- Lewis in 1950
- Born: Arlington, Massachusetts, USA
- Position: Center
- Played for: Boston College
- Playing career: 1946–1950

George Warren Lewis is a retired American ice hockey center who helped Boston College win their first national championship in 1949.

== Career ==
Lewis began attending Boston College in 1946, playing for the hockey club in his freshman year and leading the team in points. The NCAA instituted a national tournament the following year and Lewis helped the Eagles reached the inaugural NCAA tournament ultimately falling short. He returned to the ice the next season and combined with Jack Mulhern to produce one of the most potent offensive duos in college hockey. Lewis finished second in team scoring as the Eagles produced a nearly unblemished 19–1 record to earn their second tournament appearance. BC reached the final and faced Dartmouth, the only team who had beaten them all season, but a 3-point game from Lewis helped push the Eagles to a 4–3 win. Despite his scoring heroics, Lewis did not appear on either of the two all-tournament Teams.

Lewis again led the team in scoring, during his senior season, and helped the Eagles reach the tournament for the third consecutive year. They were unable to repeat their performance, surrendering 10 goals in each games to finish in fourth place. Lewis finished his career at BC with the highest goal total and second most points in program history. Because he played relatively few games he has been passed on the all-time list by many succeeding players, but he's still near the top in both points per game and hat-tricks.

BC records on Lewis' statistics are a bit muddled. The program list him as having scored 65 goals in 54 games, however, it also lists him as scoring 20 goals in 1947, 23 goals in 1949 and 26 goals in 1950. This would leave him with 69 goals in those three years alone. It's likely that the school's totals exclude his first season as that was not played under NCAA oversight. In any event, Lewis was one of the most prolific scorers to wear an Eagles sweater and in recognition of his accomplishments he was inducted into the Boston College Hall of Fame in 1981.

Lewis is the last surviving member of the 1949 championship team.

== Statistics ==
=== Regular season and playoffs ===
			Regular season					Playoffs
Season	Team	League	GP	G	A	Pts	PIM	GP	G	A	Pts	PIM
1946–47	Boston College	NCAA	—	20	23	43	—	—	—	—	—	—
1947–48	Boston College	NCAA	—	16	16	32	—	—	—	—	—	—
1948–49	Boston College	NCAA	21	23	24	47	6	—	—	—	—	—
1949–50	Boston College	NCAA	—	26	17	43	—	—	—	—	—	—
NCAA totals			—	85	80	165	—	—	—	—	—	—

== Awards and honors ==
Award	Year
AHCA First Team All-American	1949–50
