= Waltham High School (historic) =

- U.S. National Register of Historic Places
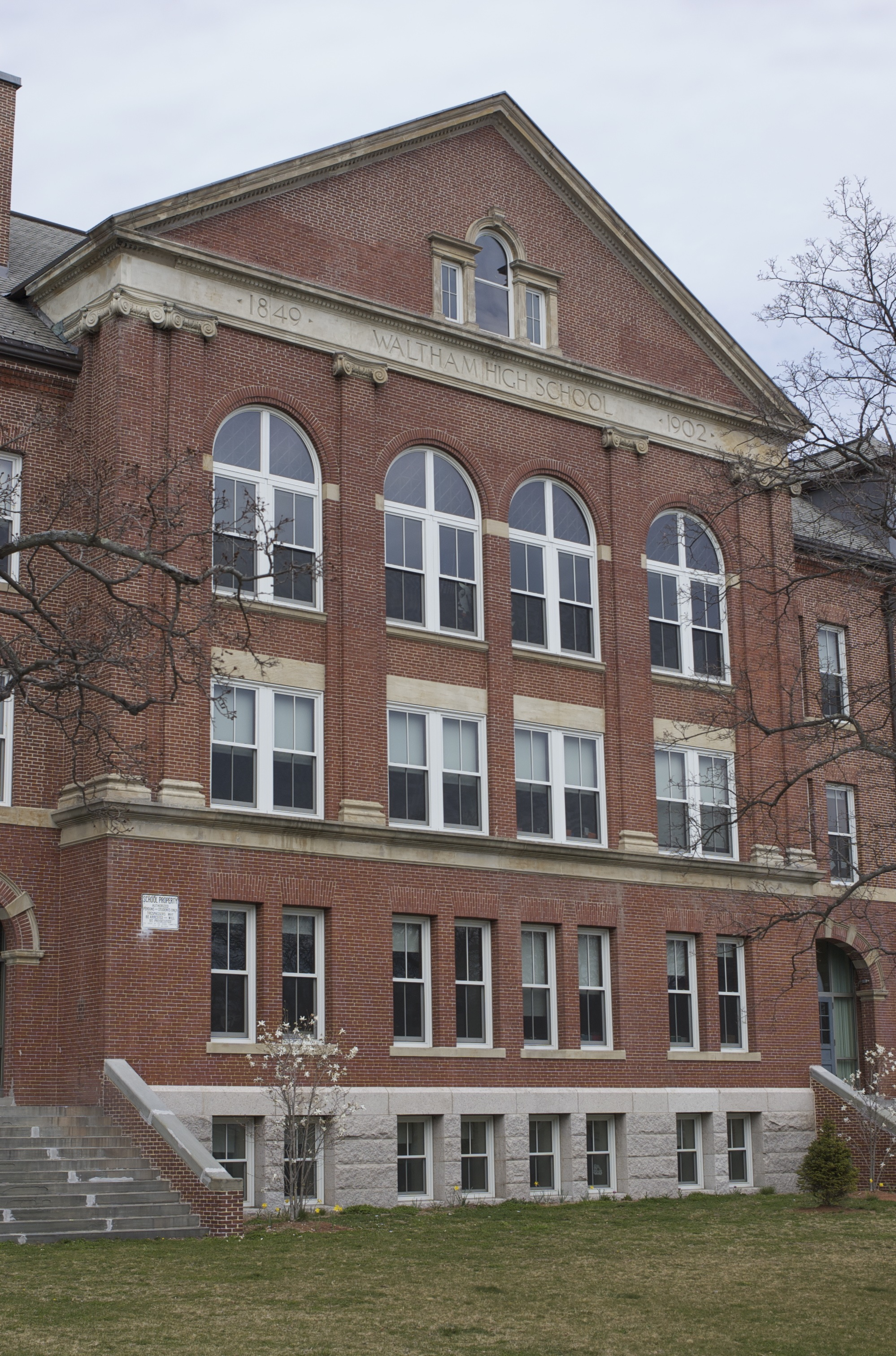
- The old building, now the John W. McDevitt Middle School
- Location: 55 School Street., Waltham, Massachusetts
- Coordinates: 42°22′44″N 71°14′3″W
- Area: less than one acre
- Built: 1902
- Architect: Patch, Samuel; Glancey, Robert
- Architectural style: Classical Revival, Romanesque
- MPS: Waltham MRA
- NRHP reference No.: 89001531
- Added to NRHP: September 28, 1989

The old Waltham High School (located at 55 School Street) was constructed in 1902. Designed by Samuel Patch and Robert Glancey, it follows the local contemporary style of Romanesque and Classical Revival architecture. Expanded in the 1920s, the building eventually fell out of favor and was replaced with Waltham's second high school Waltham High School at 617 Lexington Street in 1969. It was used as the Central Junior High School in the 1970s and 1980s. The old Waltham High became defunct by the 1990s and sat empty for many years. The building was ultimately reoccupied; the additions constructed in the 1920s were removed, restoring the school to its 1902 appearance, and a modern addition was added directly behind the old building, which left the historical structure as the façade. The new construct, known now as John W. McDevitt Middle School (named for a former superintendent), entered service in 2003.

The old Waltham High building was added to the National Register of Historic Places in 1989.

== See also ==
- National Register of Historic Places listings in Waltham, Massachusetts
