= Stouffer's Inn fire =

1980 fire in West Harrison, New York, US

Coordinates: 41°1′2″N 73°43′4″W

- Date: December 4, 1980
- Venue: Stouffer's Inn
- Location: West Harrison, New York
- Type: Structure fire
- Cause: Arson
- Deaths: 26 guests
- Injuries: 24

The Stouffer's Inn fire occurred on Thursday, December 4, 1980, at the Stouffer's Inn of Westchester (formerly the Renaissance Westchester Hotel, part of Renaissance Hotels) in West Harrison, New York. The fire killed 26 people, most through smoke inhalation, specifically carbon monoxide, hydrogen cyanide, and nitrogen dioxide. The fire is considered the biggest disaster in Westchester County history.

== Fire ==
The fire occurred in a third-story conference area where approximately 95 occupants were attending meetings in several conference rooms. The fire did not involve guest room facilities of the hotel complex.

The fire originated at about 10:13 a.m. in an exit access corridor outside of meeting rooms in the three-story fire-resistive, non-sprinklered building which was classified as a place of assembly. In the early stages of the fire, meeting room occupants were faced with rapidly deteriorating, untenable conditions impeding their escape to safety.

Four of the five fatalities were occupants of the Disbrow Room A who had attempted to escape through the exit access door located on the west wall of the room leading to The Common. One fatality was an occupant of the Wilson Room who had apparently turned right in The Common upon leaving the Wilson Room with others in that group.

Eight fatalities were located in the North Corridor. Six of the 22 occupants of the Disbrow Room A who attempted to reach safety by means of the North Corridor succumbed in the corridor. Their bodies were located in nearly single-file fashion – the manner in which they had left the Disbrow Room A and attempted their escape in the corridor. Two additional fatalities in the North Corridor were found in the corridor a few feet from the doorway into the Haight Room. These occupants of the Haight Room had attempted escape using the corridor. Eleven occupants of the Haight Room remained in the room. Six of these occupants had apparently taken refuge from fire conditions entering the room by taking refuge in a storage closet. Five of the fatalities were found in the meeting room area.

Two fatalities were also located in the southeast corner of the Disbrow Room A. They were occupants of that room.

== Casualties ==
Twenty-six of the occupants of the third floor at the time of the fire died and twenty-four were injured. Five fatalities were found in The Common, with indications that at least two persons died while attempting to escape by means of the locked promenade access doorways.

== Investigation ==
As determined by local investigative authorities, the fire was of incendiary origin involving the ignition of flammable liquid on the carpet in the vicinity of the intersection of The Common and the North and West Corridors. Police suspected arson because arson investigator Joseph A. Butler Jr. said that the intensity of the fire "could not be explained by the burning of material in the area." A survivor said he saw a "river of fire" moving along a corridor ceiling "faster than a man can run".

== Prospective perpetrator ==
Luis Marin, who was employed by the hotel at the time of the fire as a busboy, was arrested following a four-month investigation by the Westchester County District Attorney's Office. Marin was indicted by a Westchester County Grand Jury, and convicted by a jury of arson and 26 counts of murder on April 10, 1982.

Four days later, judge Lawrence N. Martin dismissed all charges against Marin, and set him free. Judge Martin decided the evidence was circumstantial, and that prosecutor Geoffrey K. Orlando's "brilliant" summation went "beyond the facts" of proving the identity of the arsonist. The Court of Appeals upheld Judge Martin's decision, saying “while the evidence was sufficient to establish that the fire was intentionally set (see People v. Sims, 37 N.Y.2d 906), the deficiency in the People's case lies in proof of the arsonist's identity.”

No other suspects have since been arrested or tried.
