= Don Norman (ice hockey) =

Hockey coach for North Dakota ca. 1940s

Coaching career (HC unless noted)
- 1946–1947: Saint John's
- 1947–1949: North Dakota

Head coaching record
- Overall: 28–22–1 (.559)

Don Norman was the head coach for the St. John's and North Dakota men's ice hockey teams in the late 1940s.

== Head coaching record ==
Record table
Season	Team	Overall	Conference	Standing	Postseason
Saint John's Johnnies (MIAC) (1946–1947)
1946–47	Saint John's	8–5–0			
St. John's:		8–5–0			
North Dakota Fighting Sioux Independent (1947–1949)
1947–48	North Dakota	11–5–0			
1948–49	North Dakota	9–12–1			
North Dakota:		20–17–1			
Total:		28–22–1			
National champion Postseason invitational champion Conference regular season champion Conference regular season and conference tournament champion Division regular season champion Division regular season and conference tournament champion Conference tournament champion

Sporting positions
Preceded by John Jamieson	Head coach of the University of North Dakota; 1947–1949	Succeeded by Fido Purpur
