= Master Electronics =

American electronic components distributor

- Company type: Privately held company
- Industry: Electronics distribution
- Founded: 1967
- Founder: Ike Nizam
- Headquarters: Phoenix, Arizona, United States
- Area served: Worldwide
- Key people: Riad Nizam (president and chief operating officer
- Number of employees: 360+
- Website: masterelectronics.com

Master Electronics (originally Master Distributors) is an American company based in Phoenix, Arizona, that distributes electronic components. The company was founded in 1967 by Ike Nizam. Master is one of the largest electronic component distributors in North America. Master Electronics now has over 300 employees with 12 locations worldwide and a stock of over 350,000 unique parts for shipment and over 3 million for sale.

== History ==
The company was founded by Syrian immigrant Ike Nizam in 1967 in Santa Barbara, California, reaching $1,000,000 in annual sales by 1971.

In 1999, the company created OnlineComponents as part of an e-commerce strategy.

In 2007, the company expanded its product scope through the purchase of All American Semiconductor.

In 2014, Master Electronics acquired Electro Sonic, growing company holdings.

In 2017, Master Electronics celebrates its 50 year anniversary since its founding.

In January 2019, the company added Advanced Thermal Solutions, a company focused on thermal management of electronics, to its line card.

In August 2023, Neutrik Americas presented Master Electronics with their 2022 Distributor Partner of the Year Award.

Since its founding the company has undergone four reinvention campaigns.

== See also ==
- E-commerce
- List of Arizona companies
- DigiKey
- Mouser Electronics
