= Thief River Falls, Minnesota =

City in Minnesota, United States

- City
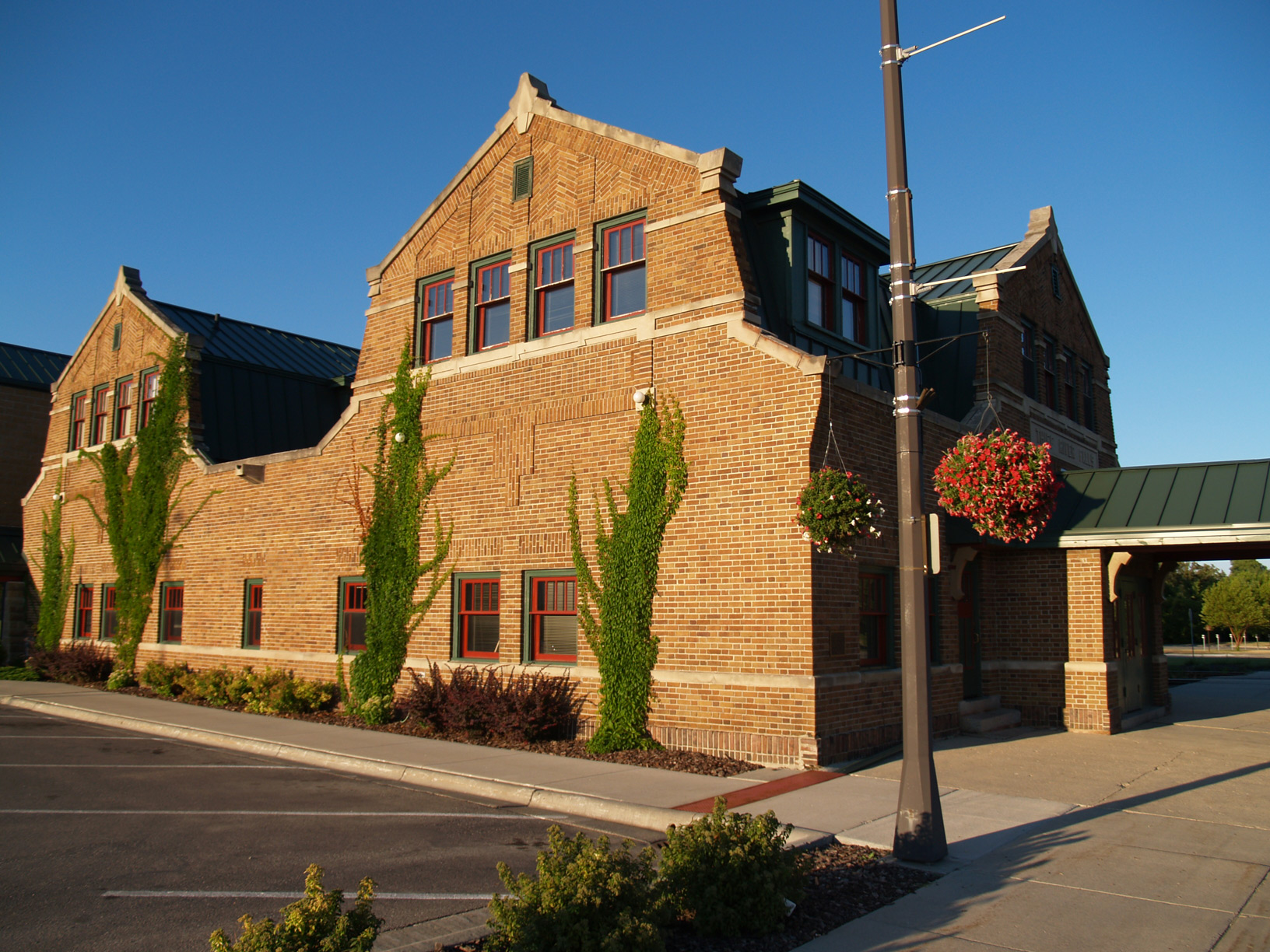
- Soo Line depot, now City Hall

- Location of the city of Thief River Falls within Pennington County, Minnesota
- Coordinates: 48°07′09″N 96°10′52″W
- Country: United States
- State: Minnesota
- County: Pennington
- Platted (village): 1887
- Incorporated (city): September 15, 1896

Government
  - Mayor: Mike Lorenson

Area
  - City: 6.12 sq mi (15.85 km^{2})
  - Land: 5.92 sq mi (15.34 km^{2})
  - Water: 0.19 sq mi (0.50 km^{2})
- Elevation: 1,135 ft (346 m)

Population (2020)
  - City: 8,749
  - Estimate (2022): 8,903
  - Density: 1,476.9/sq mi (570.25/km^{2})
  - Urban: 8,892
  - Metro: 13,845
- Time zone: UTC−6 (Central (CST))
  - Summer (DST): UTC−5 (CDT)
- ZIP Code: 56701
- Area code: 218
- FIPS code: 27-64570
- GNIS feature ID: 653129
- Sales tax: 6.875%
- Website: www.trfmn.gov

Thief River Falls, sometimes abbreviated as TRF, is a city and county seat of Pennington County in the northwest portion of the U.S. state of Minnesota. The population was 8,749 at the 2020 census.

== History ==
Thief River Falls takes its name from a geographic feature, the falls of the Red Lake River at its confluence with the Thief River. The name of the river is a loose translation of the Ojibwe phrase Gimood-akiwi ziibi, literally, the "Stolen-land river" or "Thieving-land river", which originated when a band of Dakota Indians occupied a secret encampment along the river, hence "stealing" the land, before being discovered and routed by the neighboring Ojibwe. In the Treaty of Old Crossing of 1863, the Moose Dung's Indian Reservation was established on the west bank of the Thief River, at its confluence with Red Lake River. This Indian Reservation was dissolved in 1904 and their population incorporated as part of the Red Lake Band of Chippewa.

Thief River Falls marked the limit of navigation on the Red Lake River. The eponymous town site was established in 1887 and later incorporated as a city in 1896.

== Geography ==
According to the United States Census Bureau, the city has a total area of 5.21 square miles (13.49 km^{2}), of which 5.02 square miles (13.00 km^{2}) is land and 0.19 square miles (0.49 km^{2}) is water.

Thief River Falls is located at the confluence of the Red Lake and Thief rivers. U.S. Highway 59 and Minnesota State Highways 1 and 32 are the three main routes in the community. Thief River Falls is located approximately 70 miles (110 km) south of the Canada–United States border and 52 miles (84 km) northeast of Grand Forks, North Dakota, in the northwest region of Minnesota.

=== Climate ===
Thief River Falls has a humid continental climate (Dwb) with warm to hot summers and cold to severely cold winters.

Climate data for Thief River Falls, MN
Month	Jan	Feb	Mar	Apr	May	Jun	Jul	Aug	Sep	Oct	Nov	Dec	Year
Record high °F (°C)	44 (7)	50 (10)	65 (18)	93 (34)	96 (36)	100 (38)	108 (42)	101 (38)	99 (37)	90 (32)	71 (22)	51 (11)	108 (42)
Mean maximum °F (°C)	37.9 (3.3)	35.4 (1.9)	51.6 (10.9)	71.4 (21.9)	80.5 (26.9)	85.7 (29.8)	91.1 (32.8)	87.4 (30.8)	74.5 (23.6)	72.1 (22.3)	57.1 (13.9)	42.6 (5.9)	91.1 (32.8)
Mean daily maximum °F (°C)	14.0 (−10.0)	20.9 (−6.2)	34.4 (1.3)	54.1 (12.3)	68.8 (20.4)	76.5 (24.7)	81.2 (27.3)	79.6 (26.4)	68.7 (20.4)	53.9 (12.2)	33.2 (0.7)	18.8 (−7.3)	50.3 (10.2)
Daily mean °F (°C)	4.2 (−15.4)	5.5 (−14.7)	22.6 (−5.2)	39.4 (4.1)	51.7 (10.9)	62.9 (17.2)	71.5 (21.9)	65.1 (18.4)	55.4 (13.0)	41.6 (5.3)	24.9 (−3.9)	12.7 (−10.7)	38.1 (3.4)
Mean daily minimum °F (°C)	−3.7 (−19.8)	1.7 (−16.8)	15.7 (−9.1)	30.1 (−1.1)	42.5 (5.8)	52.0 (11.1)	56.5 (13.6)	54.5 (12.5)	45.6 (7.6)	33.7 (0.9)	18.1 (−7.7)	2.2 (−16.6)	29.1 (−1.6)
Mean minimum °F (°C)	−27.9 (−33.3)	−24.6 (−31.4)	−13.7 (−25.4)	14.2 (−9.9)	28.4 (−2.0)	41.2 (5.1)	45.1 (7.3)	42.6 (5.9)	31.3 (−0.4)	18.4 (−7.6)	6.4 (−14.2)	−20.5 (−29.2)	−27.9 (−33.3)
Record low °F (°C)	−44 (−42)	−45 (−43)	−35 (−37)	−13 (−25)	11 (−12)	26 (−3)	35 (2)	30 (−1)	18 (−8)	−6 (−21)	−31 (−35)	−54 (−48)	−54 (−48)
Average precipitation inches (mm)	0.19 (4.8)	0.19 (4.8)	0.36 (9.1)	0.98 (25)	2.83 (72)	3.43 (87)	3.70 (94)	3.05 (77)	2.68 (68)	1.67 (42)	0.77 (20)	0.47 (12)	20.32 (515.7)
Average snowfall inches (cm)	7.9 (20)	5.3 (13)	4.3 (11)	1.7 (4.3)	0.1 (0.25)	0 (0)	0 (0)	0 (0)	0 (0)	1.0 (2.5)	6.8 (17)	6.2 (16)	33.3 (84.05)
Source: http://www.wrcc.dri.edu/cgi-bin/cliMAIN.pl?mn8247

== Demographics ==
Historical population
Census	Pop.	Note	%±
1890	191		—
1900	1,819		852.4%
1910	3,714		104.2%
1920	4,685		26.1%
1930	4,268		−8.9%
1940	6,019		41.0%
1950	6,926		15.1%
1960	7,151		3.2%
1970	8,618		20.5%
1980	9,105		5.7%
1990	8,010		−12.0%
2000	8,410		5.0%
2010	8,573		1.9%
2020	8,749		2.1%
2022 (est.)	8,903		1.8%
U.S. Decennial Census; 2020 Census

=== 2020 census ===
As of the 2020 census, Thief River Falls had a population of 8,749. The median age was 38.9 years. 21.6% of residents were under the age of 18 and 19.2% of residents were 65 years of age or older. For every 100 females there were 95.6 males, and for every 100 females age 18 and over there were 95.0 males age 18 and over.

99.9% of residents lived in urban areas, while 0.1% lived in rural areas.

There were 4,070 households in Thief River Falls, of which 24.6% had children under the age of 18 living in them. Of all households, 35.2% were married-couple households, 23.9% were households with a male householder and no spouse or partner present, and 31.7% were households with a female householder and no spouse or partner present. About 40.7% of all households were made up of individuals and 16.5% had someone living alone who was 65 years of age or older.

There were 4,469 housing units, of which 8.9% were vacant. The homeowner vacancy rate was 1.4% and the rental vacancy rate was 10.4%.

Racial composition as of the 2020 census
Race	Number	Percent
White	7,600	86.9%
Black or African American	130	1.5%
American Indian and Alaska Native	147	1.7%
Asian	95	1.1%
Native Hawaiian and Other Pacific Islander	3	0.0%
Some other race	206	2.4%
Two or more races	568	6.5%
Hispanic or Latino (of any race)	527	6.0%

=== 2010 census ===
As of the census of 2010, there were 8,573 people, 3,802 households, and 2,141 families residing in the city. The population density was 1,707.8 inhabitants per square mile (659.4/km^{2}). There were 4,061 housing units at an average density of 809.0 per square mile (312.4/km^{2}). The racial makeup of the city was 92.0% White, 2.1% African American, 1.9% Native American, 0.7% Asian, 1.0% from other races, and 2.3% from two or more races. Hispanic or Latino of any race were 3.2% of the population.

There were 3,802 households, of which 27.6% had children under the age of 18 living with them, 39.0% were married couples living together, 12.2% had a female householder with no husband present, 5.2% had a male householder with no wife present, and 43.7% were non-families. 36.6% of all households were made up of individuals, and 15.1% had someone living alone who was 65 years of age or older. The average household size was 2.18 and the average family size was 2.81.

The median age in the city was 37.6 years. 22.5% of residents were under the age of 18; 10.5% were between the ages of 18 and 24; 24.9% were from 25 to 44; 24.3% were from 45 to 64; and 17.7% were 65 years of age or older. The gender makeup of the city was 47.7% male and 52.3% female.

=== 2000 census ===
As of the census of 2000, there were 8,410 people, 3,619 households, and 2,091 families residing in the city. The population density was 1,760.0 inhabitants per square mile (679.5/km^{2}). There were 3,931 housing units at an average density of 822.7 per square mile (317.6/km^{2}). The racial makeup of the city was 96.56% White, 0.27% African American, 0.95% Native American, 0.67% Asian, 0.04% Pacific Islander, 0.62% from other races, and 0.90% from two or more races. Hispanic or Latino of any race were 1.63% of the population.

There were 3,619 households, out of which 27.1% had children under the age of 18 living with them, 44.2% were married couples living together, 10.6% had a female householder with no husband present, and 42.2% were non-families. 35.1% of all households were made up of individuals, and 15.7% had someone living alone who was 65 years of age or older. The average household size was 2.21 and the average family size was 2.84.

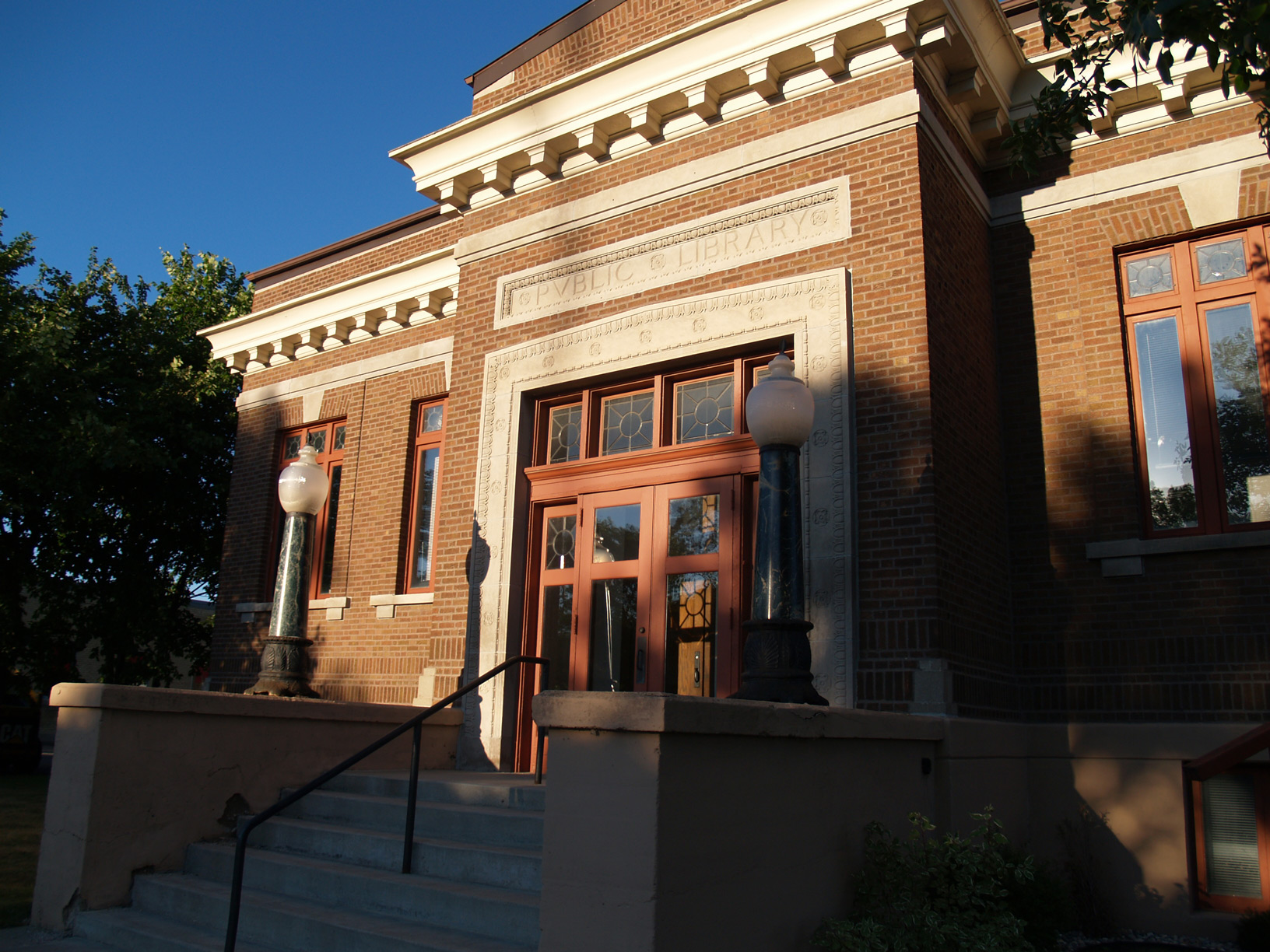
Old Carnegie library, Main Ave

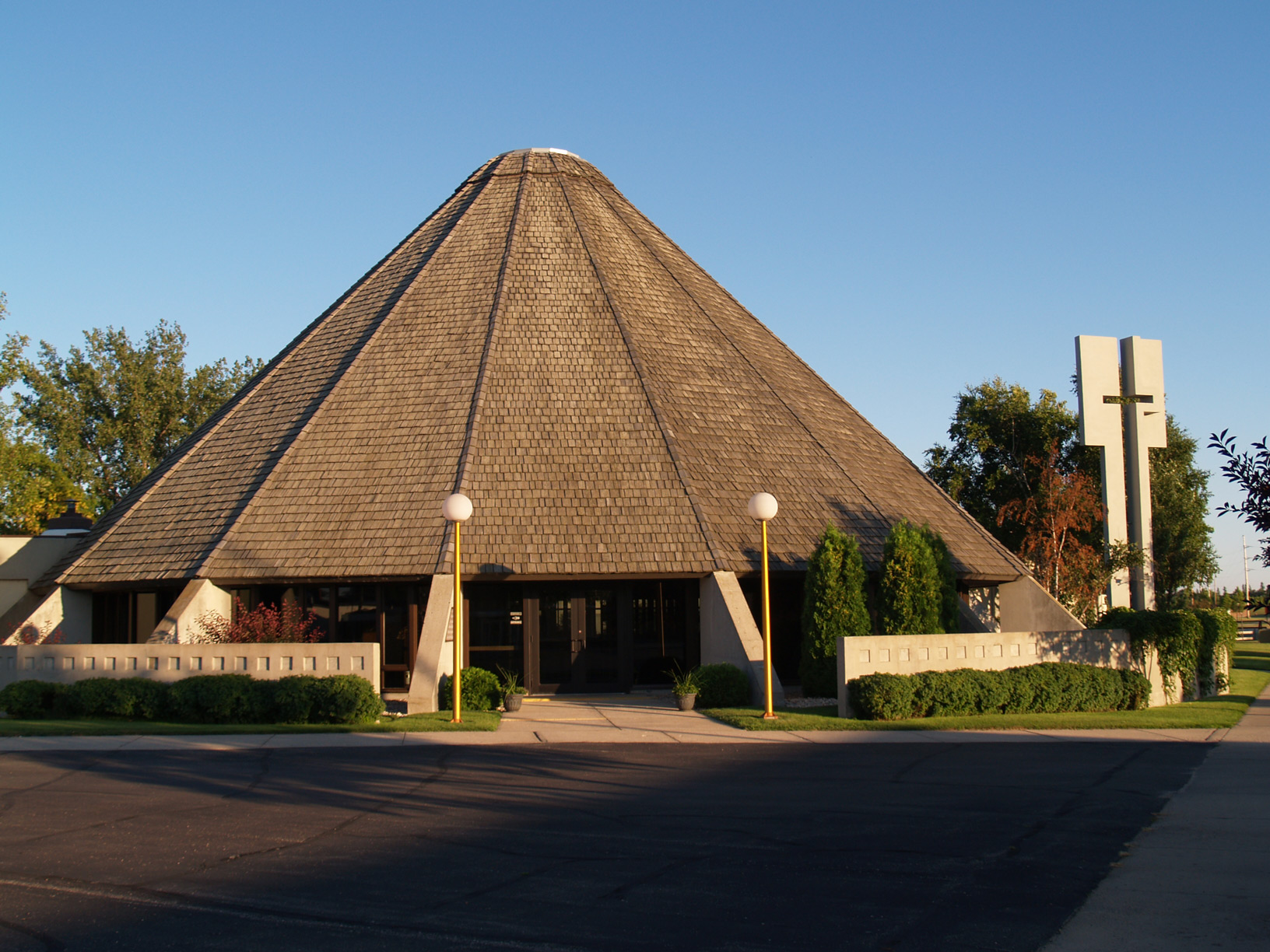
United Methodist Church, downtown

In the city, the population was spread out, with 22.4% under the age of 18, 11.7% from 18 to 24, 26.1% from 25 to 44, 20.9% from 45 to 64, and 18.8% who were 65 years of age or older. The median age was 38 years. For every 100 females, there were 90.4 males. For every 100 females age 18 and over, there were 85.8 males.

The median income for a household in the city was $30,759, and the median income for a family was $40,908. Males had a median income of $30,332 versus $20,785 for females. The per capita income for the city was $17,489. About 8.0% of families and 12.4% of the population were below the poverty line, including 11.3% of those under age 18 and 15.7% of those age 65 or over.

== Economy ==
Thief River Falls (and surrounding region) has been home to major industry including snowmobiles, farm machinery, and global electronics distribution. The town is the home of snowmobile manufacturer Arctic Cat. South of Thief River Falls is a casino, 7 Clans Casino, which also contains a hotel and indoor water park. Thief River Falls is home to the electronic parts distributor Digi-Key, one of the largest employers in the area, and was the birthplace of the vaunted Steiger Tractor, produced from 1958 to the late 1980s. Thief River Falls was home to the headquarters of the Cycle Detection Warning System up until its shutdown on April 13, 2009.

=== Rivers and rails ===
Thief River Falls is situated on the junction of two rivers, Red Lake River from the east-southeast and the Thief River from the north. The proximity to forests and shipping made Thief River Falls ideal for logging. In the late 19th century the Great Northern Railway was built, and in 1904, the Minneapolis, St. Paul and Sault Ste. Marie Railway (“Soo Line”) passed through on its route from Saint Paul to Winnipeg. Branches were later built to Drake, North Dakota, and Duluth, Minnesota. The Minnesota Northwestern Electric Railway, an electric-powered passenger train, ran from Thief River Falls to Goodridge between 1914 and 1940.

Today, the river and rails still power the local economy with tourism and shipping. Canadian Pacific Railway and Minnesota Northern Railroad now occupy tracks through town. To this day, Soo Line engine 1024 rests outside city hall (formerly the Soo Line Depot).

=== Major industries ===
==== Snowmobiles ====
Arctic Cat, Inc. can trace its roots to former Polaris Industries founder Edgar Hetteen who left Polaris in 1960 and started Polar Manufacturing in Thief River Falls. Shortly after changing name to Arctic Enterprises, the new company produced snowmobiles. Arctic Cat purchased several boat manufacturers including Spirit Marine which produced the first Wetbike in 1978. A few snowless winters in the early 1980s bankrupted the 20-year-old company, which closed its facilities by 1982. In 1984, Arctic Cat was reborn under a new company name, Arctco, which was changed to Arctic Cat in 1996. It was announced at the end of 2024 that Arctic Cat would close during the first half of 2025 in Thief River Falls.

==== Electronics distribution ====
Digi-Key Electronics is one of the largest electronics distributors in North America. The company started in 1972 with Dr. Ronald A. Stordahl's interest in ham radio, which led him to assemble and sell digital electronic keyer kits to other ham radio operators for sending radiotelegraph messages. This device was called the Digi-Keyer.

==== Tractors ====
Steiger Tractors were invented by Douglas and Maurice Steiger from Thief River Falls during the 1950s. The brothers built their first tractor the winter of 1957–58 after seeing a need to cover their ground more efficiently. After designing and building the tractors on their farm for six years, the brothers opened a production facility in Fargo, North Dakota. A new plant built in 1974 could produce a new tractor every 18 minutes. Steiger produced many models of tractor with the main feature being the horsepower. Ford chose Steiger to manufacture the Ford tractors of the late 1970s and early '80s. As the farm economy slumped in the late 1980s, Steiger had trouble selling tractors. Steiger filed for Chapter 11 bankruptcy in 1986, and was soon after sold to Tenneco, parent company of J. I. Case. Case IH continued to produce and sell Steiger tractors while introducing its own lines of 4wd tractors. Case still produces Steiger tractors at the Fargo, North Dakota, facility.

== Education ==
Thief River Falls is home to Thief River Falls Public Schools, a public school district operating a high school (Lincoln High School), middle school (Franklin Middle School), and elementary school (Challenger Elementary School). Benefactor Ralph Engelstad, who was raised in Thief River Falls, built an $11.5 million hockey arena for the high school hockey team. The arena is called Ralph Engelstad Arena, the same name as the University of North Dakota's $100 million hockey arena in Grand Forks, North Dakota. Thief River Falls is also home to Northland Community and Technical College, which also has a campus in East Grand Forks, Minnesota. The college has experienced steady growth in enrollment in the past decade.

== Health care ==
Sanford Health Thief River Falls Northwest Medical Center is a Critical Access Hospital (CAH) with 25 beds; has non-governmental, not-for-profit, 501(c)(3) status; and is the area's community hospital. It houses an inpatient and outpatient mental health unit, encompasses a free-standing 15-bed group home for mentally ill persons and a free-standing 10-bed treatment center for emotionally disturbed children, has doctors on site in the Emergency Room 24/7, and is the only hospital in the community of Thief River Falls, Minnesota.

It is staffed by over 300 employees, making it one of the largest employers in the area. It is governed by an eight-member board of directors.

Sanford Health Thief River Falls offers medical services that include laboratory, surgery, family physicians, and a women's health center.

== Transportation ==
=== Major highways ===
Routes located within the city of Thief River Falls:

- U.S. Highway 59
- Minnesota State Highway 1
- Minnesota State Highway 32

=== Air service ===
The city and surrounding community is served by Thief River Falls Regional Airport. Daily flights to and from the airport are provided by Denver Air Connection.

== Media ==
The local newspaper is the weekly Thief River Falls Times. The daily newspapers Grand Forks Herald and Minneapolis Star Tribune are also available.

Thief River Falls is home to several radio stations, and several radio stations from Grand Forks, North Dakota, can also be received.

Thief River Falls is part of the Fargo/Grand Forks television market. Local Fox affiliate KVRR-TV operates a semi-satellite licensed to Thief River Falls, KBRR-TV (channel 10), serving Grand Forks. Thief River Falls residents have access to network affiliates from Grand Forks.

=== Local radio stations ===
Licensed stations to Thief River Falls:

- KTRF 1230 AM (News/Talk)
- KKAQ 1460 AM (Country music, primarily rebroadcasts KKDQ FM)
- KSRQ 90.1 FM "Pioneer 90.1" (NCTC College radio/Independent Public Radio)
- KQMN 91.5 FM (Minnesota Public Radio classical music)
- KTRF-FM 94.1 FM "The Falls" (Adult Hits from Thief River Falls studios)
- KKDQ 99.3 FM "North Country" (Country music)
- KNTN 102.7 FM (Minnesota Public Radio news)
- K300AS 107.9 FM "Your Q FM" (translator of KKEQ 107.1 of Fosston)

Radio stations from Grand Forks and Crookston are also accessible to residents.

== Activities and attractions ==
=== LaBree Avenue ===
Since the city's foundation in 1896, LaBree Avenue has been a cornerstone of community life. Many of the businesses that were born in Thief River Falls were started on LaBree. The city's Chamber of Commerce holds an annual "Crazy Dayz", which is a "bargain day" of sorts on LaBree. Also, each fall, the city closes the street and hosts the "Great American Block Party", during which vendors line the street and live music is performed.

=== Thief River Golf Club ===
Thief River Falls is home to an 18-hole golf course situated along the Thief River north of the city.

=== Northwest Trap/Sporting Clays ===
Three miles north, two miles west of town, the "Trap Club" provides Trap on Mondays and Thursdays, Sporting Clays, on Wednesdays, HS Trap on Tuesdays (during the MN HS season) and can also provide events for any organization.

=== Snowmobiling ===
The city is along several regional snowmobile trails reaching northern Minnesota, including the Wapiti Trail, which leads to Fourtown and Grygla. Other trails lead to Greenbush, Warren, and Red Lake Falls, to name a few.

=== River Walk ===
The city's River Walk lines the rivers from one end of town to the other and connects several parks including the dam, Red Robe Park, and the Northland Woods.

== Spectator sports ==
=== Ice hockey ===
Hockey is a popular sport in Thief River Falls, much like the rest of Minnesota. The city has three arenas: Ralph Engelstad Arena, the Huck Olson Memorial Arena, and the old Thief River Falls arena located downtown. From 2016 to 2020, the city was home to the Thief River Falls Norskies, who played in the Canadian-based Superior International Junior Hockey League. In November 2025, the Federal Prospects Hockey League (FPHL) announced an expansion team set to play at Ralph Englestad Arena starting the 2026/27 season.

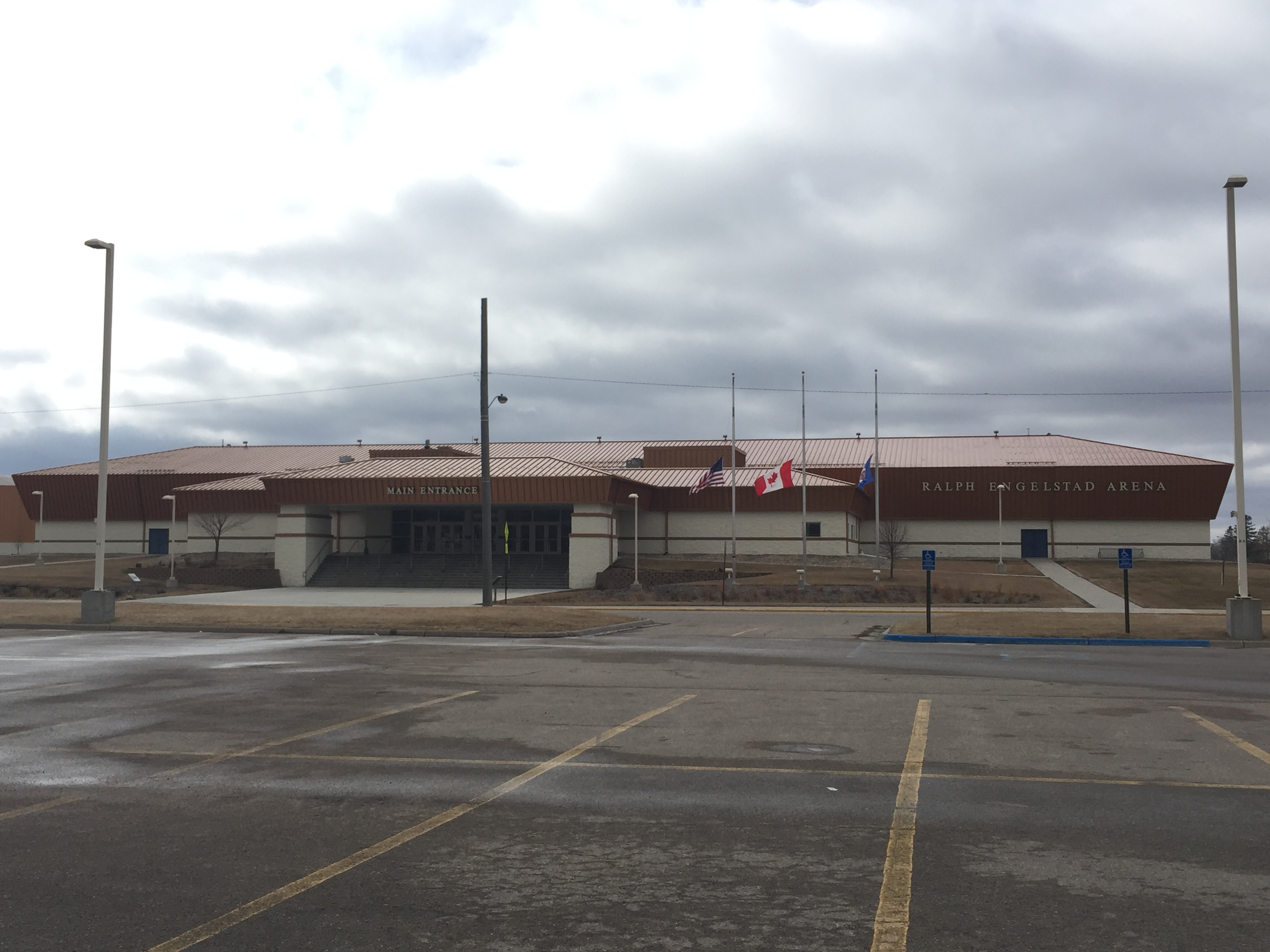
The "Mini" Ralph Engelstad Arena, Thief River Falls, Minnesota.

Thief River Falls, along with Grand Forks, North Dakota, hosted the 2005 World Junior Ice Hockey Championships between December 25, 2004, and January 4, 2005. The Ralph Engelstad Arena hosted the Thief River Falls games, one of which was broadcast on the sports network ESPN.

=== Bull riding ===
The Pennington County Fairgrounds in Thief River Falls is the host to an annual Professional Bull Riders Touring Pro Division (TPD) bull riding event. The TPD is the minor-league system of the PBR.

== In popular culture ==
=== Thief River, the play ===
The celebrated American playwright Lee Blessing's work, Thief River, premiered in 2000 at the Eugene O'Neill Theater Center in Waterford, Connecticut. It subsequently ran Off-Broadway in New York in June 2001 to mixed reviews, and later had a longer run in San Francisco. The Wall Street Journal called it "an old fashioned gay love story—one where love is upstaged by shame, secrecy and social defiance". It is the story of Gil and Ray, who at age 17 were secret lovers in what one reviewer called "a small homophobic Minnesota town in the '40s"—presumably Thief River Falls. The plot portrays a love between these two men that spans 53 years. As stated by another reviewer, "The play attempted to show what it would be like to be a gay man in a small town in the late '40s, when two men kissing would have been a revolutionary act." The play most recently ran in Chicago in early 2007, where it was called "the definitive work capturing the homosexual experience in the rural American Midwest over the last 50 years". The specific Minnesota connection of the play is unstated, but playwright Blessing grew up in the Twin Cities area and attended Minnetonka High School before leaving for Reed College in Oregon in the late 1960s.

== Notable people ==
- Robert Baker, ice hockey player who competed in ice hockey at the 1948 Winter Olympics
- Tim Bergland, ice hockey player for the Washington Capitals and Tampa Bay Lightning; captained Minnesota Gophers and participated in 1995 IIHF World Championships
- Elmer E. Berglund, railroad conductor and Minnesota state legislator
- Bill Carlson, news anchor for CBS-owned WCCO-TV in Minneapolis, Minnesota; born in Thief River Falls but was raised in St. Paul; joined WCCO Radio in 1951
- Barry Darsow, professional wrestler for Jim Crockett Promotions as "Krusher Kruschev" and in the World Wrestling Federation as "Demolition Smash"
- Ralph Engelstad, owner of Imperial Palace in Las Vegas, Nevada; a philanthropist, he donated funds to build the Ralph Engelstad Arena in Thief River Falls in 2003
- Ralph R. Erickson, United States federal judge
- John H. Hay, United States Army lieutenant general who served as commander of the Berlin Brigade
- Agnes Israelson, first woman in Minnesota to serve as a city mayor when she was elected mayor of Thief River Falls in 1953
- Zane McIntyre, goaltender in the NHL Minnesota Wild organization
- Wayne Nordhagen, professional baseball player drafted by the New York Yankees in 1968; spent parts of eight seasons in major leagues; also played in Senior Professional Baseball Association in 1989
- Gary Paulsen, author of Hatchet
- Adam Quesnell, stand-up comedian
- Wyatt Smith, retired NHL player who played for the Phoenix Coyotes, Nashville Predators, New York Islanders, Minnesota Wild, Colorado Avalanche and several AHL teams
- David Thorstad, socialist writer, gay rights activist, and NAMBLA co-founder
- John A. Yngve, Minnesota state representative and lawyer
