= Thief River Falls Public Schools =

School district in Thief River Falls, Minnesota

Thief River Falls Public Schools is a school district headquartered in the School District Service Center in Thief River Falls, Minnesota.

== Schools ==
- Lincoln High School
- Franklin Middle School
- Challenger Elementary School
