= TTI, Inc. =

Distributor of electronic components

- Type: Subsidiary
- Industry: Electronics
- Founded: 1971; 55 years ago in Fort Worth, Texas, United States
- Headquarters: Fort Worth, Texas, United States
- Key people: Mike Morton, CEO, TTI Inc. John Archer, Chief Administrative Officer; John Drabik, President, TTI IP&E Global; Jeff Newell, President, Mouser; Frank Flynn, President, Sager; Michael Kennedy, President XTG; Susan Sumners, SVP Information Services
- Products: Electronic components
- Revenue: ▲US$ 8.8 Billion (TTI Inc. 2025)
- Owner: Berkshire Hathaway
- Number of employees: 9,000+ (2025)
- Website: www.tti.com

TTI, Inc., is a distributor of electronic components that include capacitors, resistors, connectors, switches, relays, circuit protection, electromagnetics, discrete semiconductors, sensors, RF modules, and antennas.

The company was founded by Paul Andrews in 1971. A former buyer for General Dynamics, the global aerospace and defense company, Andrews developed an approach to electronic component distribution with emphasis on available-to-sell inventory, supply chain programs, and the industry’s first, formal Total Quality Management program.

Andrews was Chief Executive Officer until his passing in February 2021. Subsequently, 40-year employee and Chief Operating Officer Mike Morton was promoted to the position of CEO.

Originally named Tex-Tronics, Inc., Andrews changed the name to TTI, Inc., in 1973 to avoid a legal dispute involving another company with a similar name.

Founded to serve aerospace and defense equipment manufacturers, the company’s customers now include manufacturers in the transportation, industrial, medical, and communications sectors.

TTI, Inc. and its wholly owned subsidiaries, also known as the TTI Family of Specialists (TTI FOS), Mouser Electronics, Sager Electronics, and Exponential Technology Group employ over 8,000 people at more than 136 locations throughout the Americas, Europe, Asia, and Africa.

TTI's global headquarters is located Fort Worth, Texas, the TTI Family of Specialists maintain over 3.5 million square feet of dedicated warehouse space globally. Over 2.7 million square feet of which is located in the Americas.

European headquarters is located near Munich, Germany; nearly 600,000 square feet of distribution capacity is maintained in Europe.

Asia headquarters is located in Singapore, with distribution centers in Singapore, Hong Kong and China, totaling over 300,000 square feet of distribution capacity.

TTI has seven proximity warehouses located in Mexico: Tijuana, Hermosillo, Chihuahua, Juarez, Acuna, Reynosa, and Guadalajara, with a combined distribution capacity over 100,000 square feet.

TTI is a wholly owned subsidiary of Berkshire Hathaway Inc.

== Relevant chronology ==
TTI, Inc., entered the European market in 1992 with its first office in Munich, Germany. Since that time the company’s European reach has spread to over 40 countries. In 2008, TTI acquired the Mateleco Group, a large connector distributor in France, becoming the primary distributor in both passives and connectors in France.

TTI opened its first office in Asia in Singapore in 2000. Reach has since expanded to include three warehouses and 16 offices in 11 countries.

In 2000, TTI acquired Mouser Electronics, a broad-line catalog distributor based in Mansfield, Texas. Mouser is now a worldwide, authorized distributor of semiconductors and electronic components for over 700 industry manufacturers. The company focuses in the rapid introduction of new products and technologies for design engineers and buyers.

In December 2006, Paul Andrews agreed to sell majority ownership of TTI to Warren Buffett controlled Berkshire Hathaway. The acquisition was completed on March 30, 2007.

In 2012, Sager Electronics, a New England–based distributor with roots dating back to the 1800s, joined the TTI and Berkshire Hathaway family. Today Sager specializes in power products and services a North American customer base via headquarters in Middleborough, MA, and a national network of field account representatives and engineers, and a "Power Solutions Center" in Carrollton, TX.

TTI Israel was formally established in 2013 through the combined acquisitions of Net-Aye Components (acquired in 2010) and Ray-Q (acquired in 2013).

In 2015, Sager Electronics announced the formation of Sager Power Systems, a focused group within Sager specializing in power products and the design of power supplies.

Semiconductor distributor Symmetry Electronics was added to the TTI Family of Companies in 2017. Symmetry is a technical distributor of wireless, cellular, Bluetooth, embedded and video semiconductor technology.

In 2018, TTI acquired South Korean CHANGNAM, a specialty distributor of semiconductors principally focused on automotive, consumer electronics, industrial and wireless end markets, and RFMW Ltd., a RF and Microwave component distributor headquartered in Silicon Valley, California. Subsequently the company announced the formation of the new subsidiary, TTI Semiconductor Group.

Also in 2018, the company acquired Compona AG of Switzerland and Compona’s German subsidiary Cosy Electronics GmbH. Both Compona and Cosy are distributors of interconnect products and provide services such as in-house assembly of specific connector ranges and support on custom cable harnesses.

in July 2019 subsidiary Sager Electronics completed the acquisition of Technical Power Systems (TPS), a specialist in the production of custom battery assemblies, headquartered in Lisle, Illinois.

In January 2020 subsidiary Exponential Technology Group acquired Connected Development, a leading contract design firm specializing in wireless technology, headquartered in Cary, North Carolina.

In August 2021 subsidiary Exponential Technology Group acquired Paragon Innovations, an engineering design services firm headquartered in Richardson, Texas.

In January 2022 TTI, Inc. acquired SMD, Inc., a specialty, authorized distributor of electronic and electrical components, services, and logistic solutions, headquartered in Irvine, California.

In August 2022 subsidiary Exponential Technology Group acquires BGM Electronic Services, an engineering design services firm based in Auburn Hills, Michigan.

In October 2022 TTI acquired Ecopak Power Ltd., a specialist UK and Ireland distributor of power supplies and LED drivers.

In January 2023 subsidiary Exponential Technology Group acquired Braemac Pty. Ltd., an Australian based distributor of electronic components with 17 offices worldwide.

In March 2023 RFMW acquires MRC Gigacomp and MRC Components, Germany based distributors of RF, microwave, millimeter-wave components in Germany, Austria, Switzerland, and Benelux.

In February 2024 TTI acquires Raffenday Limited, a specialist manufacturer and distributor of low and high-voltage cable assemblies and interconnect component solutions for the automotive and transportation markets.

== Subsidiaries ==
Subsidiaries include:

- Mouser Electronics
- Sager Electronics
- Exponential Technology Group (XTG)

== Acquisitions ==
North America

- 2000 Mouser Electronics
- 2004 Capsco
- 2008 NTI
- 2012 Sager Electronics
- 2015 Norvell Electronics (Sager)(19)
- 2014 Astrex
- 2014 PowerGate (Sager)(18)
- 2017 Power Sources Unlimited (Sager)
- 2017 Symmetry Electronics (XTG)
- 2018 RFMW Ltd. (XTG)
- 2018 CHANGNAM (XTG)
- 2019 Technical Power Systems (Sager)
- 2020 Connected Development (XTG)
- 2021 Paragon Innovations (XTG)
- 2022 SMD, Inc.(15)
- 2022 BGM Electronic Services (XTG)

Europe

- 2008 Mateleco Group
- 2010 Flightspares
- 2012 Campbell Collins
- 2018 Compona AG (Cosy Electronics GmbH)
- 2022 Ecopak Power Ltd.
- 2023 MRC Gigacomp and MRC Components (RFMW)
- 2024 Raffenday Limited

Asia

- 2010 Net-Aye
- 2012 NPCS Autotronic
- 2013 Ray-Q
- 2014 HuaTong Electronics
- 2018 CHANGNAM I.N.T.LTD. (XTG)

Oceania

- 2023 Braemac (XTG)
