= Arctic Cat =

Brand of snowmobiles and all-terrain vehicles

Arctic Cat, Inc.
- Type: Subsidiary
- ISIN: US0396701049
- Industry: Powersports
- Founded: 1960; 66 years ago in Thief River Falls, Minnesota, US
- Founder: Edgar Hetteen
- Fate: Acquired by Brad Darling and an investment group
- Headquarters: Thief River Falls, Minnesota, US
- Products: All-terrain vehicles; Snowmobiles
- Revenue: ▲US$585.27 million (FY 2012)
- Operating income: ▲US$45.89 million (FY 2012)
- Net income: ▲US$29.94 million (FY 2012)
- Total assets: ▼US$255.42 million (FY 2012)
- Total equity: ▼US$138.47 Million (FY 2012)
- Number of employees: 1,369 (March 2012)
- Website: www.arcticcat.com

Arctic Cat is an American brand that makes snowmobiles and all-terrain vehicles (ATV's) manufactured in Thief River Falls, Minnesota. The company was formed in 1960. Arctic Cat designs, engineers, manufactures, and markets all-terrain vehicles, snowmobiles.

== History ==
Arctic Cat was formed by snowmobile pioneer Edgar Hetteen in 1960 after leaving his previous self-started business, Polaris Industries. Arctic Cat grew to become a major manufacturer of snowmobiles and all-terrain vehicles. The company's first name was Polar Manufacturing, but it soon changed to Arctic Enterprises. The company made its first snowmobile in 1960.

In 1968, a 15,000-square-foot winter-wear factory was opened in Rainy River, Ontario, employing an additional 60 workers. In 1970, they started the Boss Cat line.

Arctic Cat went bankrupt in 1982 but two years later, a new company, Arctco, it was created to continue the production of Arctic Cat snowmobiles. In 1996, the company changed its name to Arctic Cat.

The brand's headquarters has relocated several times, but Arctic Cat continues most of its manufacturing, along with snowmobile engineering, in Thief River Falls, Minnesota. The company also manufactures engines at a facility in St. Cloud, Minnesota.

On January 25, 2017, it was announced that Textron would acquire Arctic Cat for $247 million in a cash transaction.

In early 2019, the company announced that the Arctic Cat brand would return to its side-by-sides and ATVs beginning with the 2020 model year.

Textron announced in December 2024 that manufacturing operations in Thief River Falls and St. Cloud, Minnesota, would cease in the first half of 2025, releasing all employees.

On April 24, 2025, Arctic Cat announced that it was acquired by former Arctic Cat executive and current Argo President Brad Darling, along with an investment group that owns a significant stake in Argo. The next month, in May of 2025, Arctic Cat announced that it would continue production of snowmobiles in both the Thief River Falls, MN and St. Cloud, MN plants, hiring nearly 500 employees between both sites.

On January 7, 2026, Arctic Cat announced that it had acquired Québec based Widescape, and would be producing its stand-up enduro snowmobiles.
