= Mouser Electronics =

American electronic components distributor

Mouser Electronics, Inc.
- Type: Subsidiary
- Industry: Electronics
- Founded: El Cajon, California, U.S. (1964)
- Headquarters: Mansfield, Texas, U.S.
- Key people: Jeff Newell, President
- Products: Electronic components, capacitors, semiconductors, resistors, integrated circuits, industrial automation
- Owner: Berkshire Hathaway
- Number of employees: >4,000
- Parent: TTI, Inc.
- Website: www.mouser.com

Mouser Electronics, Inc., is an authorized global distributor of semiconductors and electronic components, among other products. With over $4 billion in annual revenue, Mouser was ranked as the seventh largest electronic component distributor in the world as of 2020. The company has 28 locations globally and more than 4,000 employees. Mouser is part of the Berkshire Hathaway family of companies.

The company’s global headquarters and distribution center are located on a 100-acre campus in the DFW Metroplex, Texas. Facilities span 1.5 million square feet to accommodate inventory for over 1.2 million unique SKUs consisting of new products and technologies from over 1,200 manufacturer brands.

Mouser invested in warehouse automation by installing 216 vertical lift modules, which is the largest installation in North America.

== E-commerce ==
The website has products from 1,200 manufacturer brands and access to more than 6.8 million products and data sheets, including electronic components and products used in industrial automation applications. It includes tools such as a project manager with bill of materials (BOM) import functionality.

The Mouser website provides resources and tools for electronic design engineers and buyers, such as inventory management and price and availability tools, as well as conversion calculators.

== History ==
Mouser was founded in El Cajon, California, by Jerry Don Mouser in 1964.

In 1986, the company relocated its corporate headquarters to Mansfield, Texas, and expanded into a new facility.

In January 2000, Mouser became a wholly owned subsidiary of TTI, Inc. in Fort Worth, Texas.

In December 2006, a majority ownership of TTI was sold to Warren Buffett-controlled Berkshire Hathaway.

In 2008, the company opened an international office in Shanghai, and continued to expand globally opening customer service and technical support branches worldwide. Branch locations include Brazil, Canada, Mexico, Hong Kong, Shanghai, India, Japan, Korea, Malaysia, Philippines, Singapore, Taiwan, Thailand, Vietnam, Israel, Germany, United Kingdom, France, Italy, Netherlands, Spain, Sweden, Poland and Czech Republic. Mouser expanded into Lithuania and Australia with new office openings in 2023 and 2024, bringing the total to 28 global locations.

In 2025, Jeff Newell was appointed President, with Glenn Smith continuing as Chief Executive Officer. Glenn retired at the end of 2026.

In 2013, Mouser cosponsored the SAE Counterfeit parts Avoidance Symposium in Canada. In 2018, Mouser became the first electronic component distributor to receive accreditation for AC7403 from the Counterfeit Avoidance Accreditation Program (CAAP). Through the accreditation to AC7403, Mouser demonstrates compliance with the AS6496 Aerospace Standard.

The company has been presented awards such as "Electronics Choice Industry Award for Community Activism - Social or Educational Cause" from the Electronic Components Industry Association in 2013, and from connector manufacturer Harting in 2013 for "New Customer Growth" and "New Product Growth". Mouser was named Molex “eCatalog Distributor of the Year” globally and in the Americas, Europe and Asia in 2020.

In early 2020, the company completed another expansion of the corporate headquarters and global distribution center in Dallas-Fort Worth.

== See also ==
- DigiKey, American electronic component distributor
- Premier Farnell, British electronic component distributor
- RS Group plc, British electronics & industrial distributor
- Master Electronics, American electronic component distributor
