= KKDQ =

Country music radio station in Thief River Falls, Minnesota

Coordinates: 48°03′22″N 96°22′23″W

- Thief River Falls, Minnesota; United States
- Frequency: 99.3 MHz
- Branding: North Country 99.3

Programming
- Format: Country
- Affiliations: ABC News Radio

Ownership
- Owner: Tor Ingstad; (Iowa City Broadcasting Company)

Technical information
- Licensing authority: FCC
- Facility ID: 3245
- Class: C3
- ERP: 18,000 watts
- HAAT: 118 meters (387 ft)

Links
- Public license information: Public file; LMS
- Webcast: Listen live
- Website: trfradio.com

KKDQ (99.3 FM) is a radio station in Thief River Falls, Minnesota. It is owned by Thomas E. Ingstad and airs a country music format. The station can be listened to online.
