= Bernie Burke =

American ice hockey player (1925–2013)

- Burke in 1948
- Born: May 27, 1925 Newton, Massachusetts, USA
- Died: August 13, 2013 (aged 88)
- Position: Goaltender
- Played for: Boston College; Boston Olympics
- Playing career: 1942–1950
Medal record
Men's ice hockey
Representing United States
World Championships
Silver medal – second place	1950 London	Team

Bernard M. Burke Jr. was an American ice hockey goaltender who won a silver medal at the 1950 World Championships and captained the Boston College to the national championship in 1949.

== Career ==
Burke first began attending Boston College in 1942, joining the ice hockey team under John Kelley. After his freshman year, however, the university, along with many of its contemporaries, suspended its ice hockey program due to the United States' involvement with World War II. Burke left college and joined the Navy, spending approximately three years in the service.

After leaving the Navy Burke returned to BC for the 1946–47 school year and rejoined the hockey team. He eventually became the starter and helped the Eagles reach the inaugural NCAA Division I Men's Ice Hockey Tournament in 1948.

Burke was selected as team captain for his senior season. He led the Eagles to their best record in team history, finishing their regular season with a 17–1 record. Burke held the fort in two tough battles to win the New England Tournament (the precursor to the Beanpot) and garnered the Eagles a second consecutive bid to the national tournament. Boston College won both games to capture the championship, with Burke being named to the NCAA All-Tournament Second Team.

After graduating, Burke joined the US National Team for the 1950 World Championships, winning a silver medal. Burke retired following the 1950 season and, after a year off, returned to his alma mater to serve as the coach for the freshman team. He remained in that position until the NCAA ended the restriction for freshman on varsity teams, after which he became the goaltending coach for the varsity squad. He retired in 1993, after more than 45 years at Boston College.

== Honors ==
Burke was inducted into the Boston College Athletic Hall of Fame in 1973

== Awards and honors ==
Award	Year
AHCA Second Team All-American	1947–48
NCAA All-Tournament First Team	1948
AHCA First Team All-American	1948–49
NCAA All-Tournament Second Team	1949
