= KTRF-FM =

Coordinates: 47°59′34″N 95°58′40″W

- Red Lake Falls, Minnesota; United States
- Broadcast area: Red Lake Falls/Thief River Falls
- Frequency: 94.1 MHz
- Branding: 94.1 The Falls

Programming
- Format: Adult Hits

Ownership
- Owner: Tor Ingstad; (Iowa City Broadcasting Company)
- Sister stations: KTRF

History
- Call sign meaning: Thief River Falls

Technical information
- Licensing authority: FCC
- Facility ID: 189577
- Class: C2
- ERP: 50,000 watts
- HAAT: 98 metres (322 ft)

Links
- Public license information: Public file; LMS
- Website: www.trfradio.com

KTRF-FM (94.1 FM, "The Falls") is a radio station broadcasting an Adult Hits format. Licensed to Red Lake Falls, Minnesota, it serves the Thief River Falls area. The station is owned by Thomas E. Ingstad.
