= Massachusetts State College–Fort Devens =

- Type: Public
- Active: 1946–1949
- Students: 1,700
- Location: Ayer, Massachusetts, US
- Campus: Urban
- Colors: Crimson and White
- Nickname: Chiefs

Massachusetts State College–Fort Devens (also referred to as 'Devens State College' or 'Fort Devens State') was a public university located in Ayer, Massachusetts, United States.

== History ==
After the end of World War II, the G.I. Bill helped swell the ranks of colleges in Massachusetts. As a result, Fort Devens, which had served as a mustering ground and internment camp during the war, was converted into a college by the University of Massachusetts Board of Trustees in 1946. The school was only open to veterans of the war who were Massachusetts residents. The campus was placed under the supervision of Massachusetts State College–Amherst.

The initial plan was to have the campus open for two years while the wave of returning servicemen filtered through the college system. Those plans were later changed to allow Devens State to remain open for as long as it took all veterans to receive 4-year degrees. That fall the school opened with 1,310 enrolled students and saw its attendance increase to 1,700 for the spring semester. Unfortunately, most of the student body was unhappy with their accommodations; the former military barracks had been converted into housing and caused many students to transfer out as quickly as possible. Enrollment declined sharply each year and eventually forced the closure of the college following the 1948–49 academic year.

== Education ==
While it was active, Devens State offered courses in language arts, science, agriculture, engineering, and business administration.

== Athletics ==
Shortly after opening, students organized ice hockey and basketball teams. In the spring, baseball, track and field, golf and tennis clubs were also started. A football team was put together for the school's second year. The school's teams used the moniker 'Chiefs' for the duration of their existences. Vic Stout, a former Boston sportswriter and public relations and athletic officer at Fort Devens, was the school's director of athletics and physical education.
