= Jack Mulhern (ice hockey) =

American ice hockey player

- Mulhern in a 1950 game against Boston University

Personal information
- Born: July 18, 1927 Boston, Massachusetts, USA
- Died: September 19, 2007 (aged 80) Charlestown, Massachusetts, USA
Medal record
Men's Ice Hockey
Silver medal – second place	1952 Oslo	Team

John Francis Mulhern (July 18, 1927 – September 19, 2007) was an American ice hockey player. He won a silver medal at the 1952 Winter Olympics.

== Awards and honors ==
Award	Year
NCAA All-Tournament First Team	1949
