= List of United States national ice hockey team rosters =

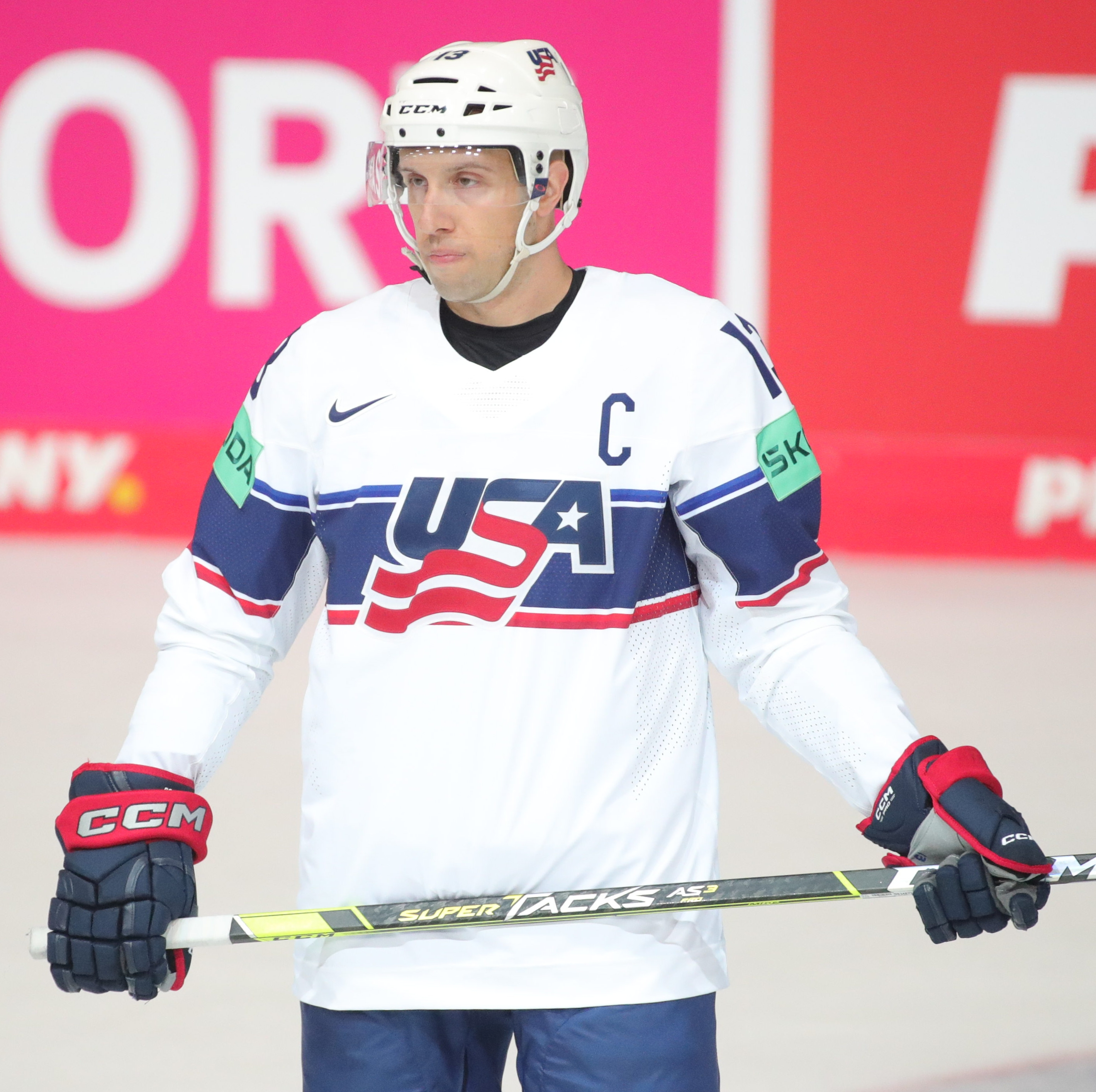
Team USA captain Nick Bonino at the 2023 IIHF World Championship

The United States of America's men's, women's, and men's under-20 teams compete annually in the Ice Hockey World Championships, IIHF World Women's Championships, and the IIHF World Junior Championship. The men's and women's senior teams also compete quadrennially in the Olympic Games, starting from 1920 and 1998, respectively. The men's national team have also competed in other international tournaments such as the Canada Cup, World Cup of Hockey, and NHL 4 Nations Face-Off.

== Abbreviations ==
F	Forward	LW	Left wing	C	Center	RW	Right wing	W	Winger	D	Defenseman	G	Goaltender

== Men's Olympics ==
=== 1920 Summer Olympics ===
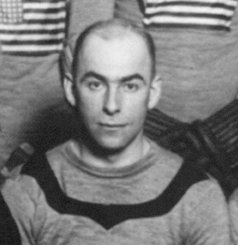
American Herb Drury led the 1920 tournament in scoring, with 14 goals

- Host City: Antwerp, Belgium
- won silver medal

The following is the American roster for the men's ice hockey tournament at the 1920 Summer Olympics. Originally, the United States had planned to send the winner of a playoff series, but ultimately scrapped the idea.

Head Coach: Cornelius Fellowes

Pos	Name	Height (cm)	Weight (kg)	Birthdate	Birthplace	Team
G	Raymond Bonney	175	—	April 2, 1892	Phoenix, New York	Pittsburgh Athletic Association
G	Cyril Weidenborner	167	64	March 30, 1895	Saint Paul, Minnesota	St. Paul Athletic Club
D	Edward Fitzgerald	180	79	August 3, 1890	Northfield, Minnesota	St. Paul Athletic Club
D	Moose Goheen	183	99	February 9, 1894	White Bear Lake, Minnesota	St. Paul Athletic Club
D	Leon Tuck	175	82	May 25, 1891	Melrose, Massachusetts	Boston Athletic Association
Rover	Herbert Drury	170	75	March 2, 1896	Midland, Ontario	Pittsburgh Athletic Association
F	Frank Synott	—	—	December 28, 1891	Chatham, New Brunswick	Boston Athletic Association
LW	Anthony Conroy	174	70	October 19, 1895	Saint Paul, Minnesota	St. Paul Athletic Club
C	George Geran	175	82	August 3, 1896	Holyoke, Massachusetts	Boston Athletic Association
C	Lawrence McCormick	165	—	July 12, 1890	Buckingham, Quebec	Pittsburgh Athletic Association
RW	Joseph McCormick – C	175	67	August 12, 1894	Buckingham, Quebec	Pittsburgh Athletic Association

=== 1924 Winter Olympics ===
- Host City: Chamonix, France
- won silver medal

The following is the American roster for the men's ice hockey tournament at the 1924 Winter Olympics.

Head Coach: William Haddock

No.	Pos	Name	Height (cm)	Weight (kg)	Birthdate	Birthplace	Team
2	G	Alphonse Lacroix	170	62	October 21, 1897	Newton, Massachusetts	Boston Athletic Association
5	G	Art Langley	178	—	June 25, 1896	Melrose, Massachusetts	Melrose Athletic Club
1	D	Taffy Abel	185	102	May 28, 1900	Sault Ste. Marie, Michigan	Michigan Soo Wildcats
6	D	Herbert Drury	170	75	March 2, 1896	Midland, Ontario	Pittsburgh Yellow Jackets
4	D	Irving Small – C	178	—	July 19, 1891	Cambridge, Massachusetts	Boston Athletic Association
8	F	John Lyons	—	—	April 4, 1899	Arlington, Massachusetts	Boston Athletic Association
7	F	Justin McCarthy	—	—	January 25, 1899	Charlestown, Massachusetts	Boston Athletic Association
3	F	Willard Rice	—	—	April 21, 1895	Newtonville, Massachusetts	Boston Athletic Association
9	F	Frank Synott	165	58	December 28, 1891	Chatham, New Brunswick	Boston Athletic Association

=== 1928 Winter Olympics ===
The United States did not send a team to play ice hockey at the 1928 Winter Olympics.

=== 1932 Winter Olympics ===
- Host City: Lake Placid, United States
- won silver medal

The following is the American roster for the men's ice hockey tournament at the 1932 Winter Olympics.

Head Coach: Alfred Winsor

Assistant Coach: Gil Gleason

No.	Pos	Name	Birthdate	Birthplace	1932 team
6	G	Franklin Farrell	March 23, 1908	New Haven, Connecticut	Yale University
10	G	Edwin Frazier	January 21, 1907	Stoneham, Massachusetts	Dartmouth College
5	D	Osborne Anderson	October 15, 1908	Fredrikstad, Østfold, Norway	Boston Olympics (EHL)
2	D	Douglas Everett	April 3, 1905	Cambridge, Massachusetts	Dartmouth College
9	D	Gerard Hallock	June 4, 1905	Pottstown, Pennsylvania	Princeton University
11	D	Robert Livingston	November 3, 1908	Lawrence, New York	Yale University
7	F/D	Johnny Bent	August 5, 1908	Eagles Mere, Pennsylvania	Yale University
1	F	John Chase – C	June 12, 1906	Milton, Massachusetts	Harvard University
12	F	John Cookman	September 2, 1909	Englewood, New Jersey	Yale University
15	F	Joseph Fitzgerald	October 10, 1904	Brighton, Massachusetts	Boston College
4	F/D	John Garrison	February 13, 1909	West Newton, Massachusetts	Harvard University
8	F	Francis Nelson	January 24, 1910	New York City, New York	Yale University
3	F	Winthrop Palmer	December 5, 1906	Summit, New Jersey	Yale University
14	F	Gordon Smith	February 14, 1908	Winchester, Massachusetts	Boston Olympics (EHL)

=== 1936 Winter Olympics ===
- Host City: Garmisch-Partenkirchen, Germany
- won bronze medal

The following is the American roster for the men's ice hockey tournament at the 1936 Winter Olympics.

Head Coach: Albert I. Prettyman

No.	Pos	Name	Birthdate	Birthplace	1935–1936 team
12	G	Tom Moone	November 6, 1908	Ottawa, Ontario, Canada	Boston Olympics (EHL)
5	D	Philip LaBatte	July 5, 1911	Minneapolis, Minnesota	Baltimore Orioles (EHL)
8	D	Frank Shaughnessy Jr.	June 21, 1911	Roanoke, Virginia	Montreal Victorias (QAHA)
11	F/D	John Garrison – C	February 13, 1909	West Newton, Massachusetts	Harvard University
9	F	Fred Kammer	June 3, 1912	Montclair, New Jersey	Princeton University
3	F	John Lax	July 23, 1911	Arlington, Massachusetts	Boston University
4	F	Elbridge Ross	August 2, 1909	Melrose, Massachusetts	Colgate University
10	F	Paul Rowe	May 5, 1914	Somerville, Massachusetts	Boston University
6	F	Gordon Smith	February 14, 1908	Winchester, Massachusetts	Boston Olympics (EHL)
1	F	Frank Spain	February 17, 1909	Quitman, Georgia	Boston Olympics (EHL)
14	F	Frank Stubbs, Jr.	July 12, 1909	South Wellfleet, Massachusetts	New York Athletic Club (EHL)

=== 1948 Winter Olympics ===
- Host City: St. Moritz, Switzerland
- 4th place, disqualified

The following is the American roster for the men's ice hockey tournament at the 1948 Winter Olympics.

Head Coach: John Garrison

No.	Pos	Name	Birthdate	Birthplace	1947–1948 team
1	G	Goodwin Harding – C	December 11, 1920	Brookline, Massachusetts	Harvard University
2	G	Herb Vaningen	November 17, 1924	Greenwich, Connecticut	Yale University
6	D	Jack Garrity	April 1, 1926	Woburn, Massachusetts	Boston University
6	D	Jack Kirrane	August 20, 1930	Brookline, Massachusetts	Boston Olympics (EHL)
11	D	Allan Opsahl	September 27, 1924	Minneapolis, Minnesota	Minneapolis Bermans (AAHL)
8	D	Stan Priddy	February 26, 1921	Brookline, Massachusetts	Dartmouth College
3	D	Jack Riley	June 15, 1922	Boston, Massachusetts	Dartmouth College
14	F	Robert Baker	December 21, 1926	Thief River Falls, Minnesota	Thief River Falls Thieves
15	F	Robert Boeser	June 30, 1927	Minneapolis, Minnesota	Minneapolis Bermans (AAHL)
5	F	Bruce Cunliffe	August 19, 1925	Keene, New Hampshire	Dartmouth College
9	F	Donald Geary	July 10, 1926	Hamden, Connecticut	New Haven All-Stars (independent)
4	F	Bruce Mather	July 25, 1926	Belmont, Massachusetts	Dartmouth College
12	F	Fred Pearson	March 23, 1923	Beverly, Massachusetts	Yale University
10	F	Ralph Warburton	February 7, 1924	Cranston, Rhode Island	Dartmouth College

=== 1952 Winter Olympics ===
- Host City: Oslo, Norway
- won silver medal

The following is the American roster for the men's ice hockey tournament at the 1952 Winter Olympics.

Head Coach: John El Pleban

No.	Pos	Name	Birthdate	Birthplace	1951–1952 team
1	G	Richard Desmond	March 2, 1927	Medford, Massachusetts	Dartmouth College
0	G	Donald Whiston	June 19, 1927	Lynn, Massachusetts	Brown University
6	G	Ken Yackel	March 5, 1930	Saint Paul, Minnesota	University of Minnesota
9	D	John Noah	November 21, 1927	Crookston, Minnesota	University of North Dakota
12	D	James Sedin	June 25, 1930	Saint Paul, Minnesota	University of Minnesota
2	D	Allen Van – C	March 30, 1915	Newport, Minnesota	University of Minnesota
8	F	Rube Bjorkman	February 27, 1929	Roseau, Minnesota	University of Minnesota
7	F	Len Ceglarski	June 27, 1926	East Walpole, Massachusetts	Boston College
3	F	Joseph Czarnota	March 25, 1925	Wakefield, Massachusetts	Boston University
11	F	Andre Gambucci	November 12, 1928	Eveleth, Minnesota	Colorado College
14	F	Clifford Harrison	October 30, 1927	Walpole, Massachusetts	Dartmouth College
5	F	Gerald Kilmartin	July 7, 1926	Providence, Rhode Island	Brown University
16	F	John Mulhern	July 18, 1927	Boston, Massachusetts	Boston College
15	F	Arnold Oss	April 18, 1928	Minneapolis, Minnesota	Dartmouth College
4	F	Robert Rompre	April 11, 1929	International Falls, Minnesota	Colorado College

=== 1956 Winter Olympics ===
- Host City: Cortina d'Ampezzo, Italy
- won silver medal

The following is the American roster for the men's ice hockey tournament at the 1956 Winter Olympics.

Head Coach: John Mariucci

No.	Pos	Name	Height (cm)	Weight (kg)	Birthdate	Birthplace	1955–1956 team
1	G	Willard Ikola	173	71	July 28, 1932	Eveleth, Minnesota	University of Michigan
1	G	Don Rigazio	180	73	July 3, 1934	Cambridge, Massachusetts	Cambridge University
11	D	Wendell Anderson	183	77	February 1, 1933	Saint Paul, Minnesota	University of Minnesota
2	D	Dan McKinnon	185	96	April 21, 1922	Williams, Minnesota	University of North Dakota
15	D	John Petroske	183	84	August 6, 1934	Hibbing, Minnesota	University of Minnesota
3	D	Ed Sampson	180	77	December 23, 1921	International Falls, Minnesota	Fort Frances Hockey Club
10	F	Wellington Burtnett	183	85	August 26, 1930	Somerville, Massachusetts	Boston College
12	F	Gene Campbell – C	180	77	August 17, 1932	Minneapolis, Minnesota	University of Minnesota
18	F	Gordon Christian	175	75	November 21, 1927	Warroad, Minnesota	University of North Dakota
9	F	Bill Cleary	179	80	August 19, 1934	Cambridge, Massachusetts	Harvard University
6	F	Richard Dougherty	175	85	August 5, 1932	International Falls, Minnesota	University of Minnesota
4	F	John Matchefts	170	68	June 18, 1931	Eveleth, Minnesota	University of Michigan
8	F	John Mayasich	183	82	May 22, 1933	Eveleth, Minnesota	University of Minnesota
5	F	Richard Meredith	170	71	December 22, 1932	South Bend, Indiana	University of Minnesota
14	F	Weldon Olson	178	73	November 12, 1932	Marquette, Michigan	Michigan State University
7	F	Ken Purpur	170	64	March 1, 1932	Grand Forks, North Dakota	University of North Dakota
17	F	Richard Rodenheiser	173	71	October 17, 1932	Malden, Massachusetts	Boston University

=== 1960 Winter Olympics ===
- Host City: Squaw Valley, United States
- won gold medal

The following is the American roster for the men's ice hockey tournament at the 1960 Winter Olympics.

Head Coach: Jack Riley

No.	Pos	Name	Height (cm)	Weight (kg)	Birthdate	Birthplace	Club/team
2	G	Jack McCartan	185	89	August 5, 1935	St. Paul, Minnesota	University of Minnesota
1	G	Larry Palmer	—	—	January 7, 1938	Malden, Massachusetts	West Point
3	D	Jack Kirrane, Jr. – C	178	77	August 20, 1928	Brookline, Massachusetts	None
4	D	John Mayasich	183	82	May 22, 1933	Eveleth, Minnesota	University of Minnesota
5	D	Bob Owen	178	80	June 8, 1936	St. Louis Park, Minnesota	Harvard University
9	D	Rod Paavola	183	86	August 21, 1939	Hancock, Michigan	None
15	C	Paul Johnson	180	82	May 18, 1936	West St. Paul, Minnesota	Rochester Mustangs (USHL)
8	C	Bob McVey	190	86	March 14, 1936	Hartford, Connecticut	Harvard University
12	C	Tom Williams	178	82	April 17, 1940	Duluth, Minnesota	Duluth Swans
6	W	Bill Christian	176	80	January 29, 1938	Warroad, Minnesota	Warroad Lakers
10	W	Roger Christian	175	68	December 1, 1935	Warroad, Minnesota	Warroad Lakers
7	W	Bill Cleary, Jr.	178	80	August 19, 1934	Cambridge, Massachusetts	Harvard University
14	W	Bob Cleary	178	76	April 21, 1936	Cambridge, Massachusetts	Harvard University
11	W	Gene Grazia	180	82	July 29, 1934	West Springfield, Massachusetts	Michigan State University
18	W	Richard Meredith	170	68	December 22, 1932	South Bend, Indiana	University of Minnesota
16	W	Weldy Olson	178	73	November 12, 1932	Marquette, Michigan	Michigan State University
17	W	Dick Rodenheiser	173	75	October 17, 1932	Malden, Massachusetts	Boston College

=== 1964 Winter Olympics ===
- Host City: Innsbruck, Austria
- finished 5th

The following is the American roster for the men's ice hockey tournament at the 1964 Winter Olympics.

Head Coach: Edward Jeremiah

No.	Pos	Name	Height (cm)	Weight (kg)	Birthdate	Birthplace	1963–1964 team
1	G	Pat Rupp	175	81	August 12, 1942	Detroit, Michigan	Flin Flon Bombers (SJHL)
1	G	Thomas Yurkovich	180	82	September 29, 1935	Eveleth, Minnesota	Rochester Mustangs (USHL)
2	D	Red Martin	183	86	July 5, 1938	Boston, Massachusetts	None
3	D	Thomas "Jake" McCoy	177	82	January 2, 1942	Minneapolis, Minnesota	Blind River Hockey Club
4	D	Wayne Meredith	175	80	October 4, 1939	South Bend, Indiana	St. Paul Saints (IHL)
17	D	Donald Ross	180	83	October 11, 1942	Roseau, Minnesota	University of North Dakota (NCAA)
18	D	James Westby	183	82	March 5, 1937	Minneapolis, Minnesota	Fort Frances Canadians
6	F	David Brooks	175	68	December 27, 1939	Saint Paul, Minnesota	Rochester Mustangs (USHL)
9	F	Herb Brooks – C	186	98	August 5, 1937	Saint Paul, Minnesota	Rochester Mustangs (USHL)
11	F	Roger Christian	175	68	December 1, 1935	Warroad, Minnesota	Warroad Lakers
5	F	Bill Christian	176	80	January 29, 1938	Warroad, Minnesota	Warroad Lakers
16	F	Paul Coppo	180	80	November 2, 1938	Hancock, Michigan	Green Bay Bobcats (USHL)
10	F	Daniel Dilworth	172	77	February 23, 1942	International Falls, Minnesota	St. Paul Saints (IHL)
14	F	Dates Fryberger	177	73	May 5, 1940	Duluth, Minnesota	Middlebury College
12	F	Paul Johnson	183	82	May 18, 1937	West St. Paul, Minnesota	Waterloo Black Hawks (USHL)
7	F	William Reichart – C	170	71	July 3, 1935	Winnipeg, Manitoba, Canada	Rochester Mustangs (USHL)
8	F	Gary Schmalzbauer	175	73	January 27, 1940	Saint Paul, Minnesota	Rochester Mustangs (USHL)

=== 1968 Winter Olympics ===
- Host City: Grenoble, France
- finished 6th

The following is the American roster for the men's ice hockey tournament at the 1968 Winter Olympics.

Head Coach: Murray Williamson

No.	Pos	Name	Height (cm)	Weight (kg)	Birthdate	Birthplace	1967–1968 team
23	G	Jim Logue	183	89	25, March 1941	Melrose, Massachusetts	Concord Eastern Olympics (NEnHL)
1	G	Pat Rupp	175	81	August 12, 1942	Detroit, Michigan	Dayton Gems (IHL)
15	D	Craig Falkman	180	95	August 1, 1943	Saint Paul, Minnesota	Rochester Mustangs (USHL)
18	D	Robert Gaudreau	186	82	March 8, 1944	Providence, Rhode Island	Brown University
19	D	Paul Hurley	183	86	July 12, 1945	Everett, Massachusetts	Boston College
2	D	Lou Nanne – C	173	75	June 2, 1941	Sault Sainte Marie, Ontario	Rochester Mustangs (USHL)
7	D	Bob Paradise	176	80	22, April 1944	Saint Paul, Minnesota	Minnesota Nationals (USHL)
3	D	Bruce Riutta	191	89	October 14, 1944	Hancock, Michigan	Michigan Tech
4	F	Herb Brooks – C	186	98	August 5, 1937	Saint Paul, Minnesota	Rochester Mustangs (USHL)
16	F	John Cunniff	186	89	July 9, 1944	Boston, Massachusetts	Boston College
12	F	Jack Dale	175	73	December 19, 1945	Saint Paul, Minnesota	University of Minnesota
6	F	Thomas Hurley	186	91	August 29, 1944	Massena, New York	Clarkson University
9	F	Leonard Lilyholm	183	82	April 1, 1941	Minneapolis, Minnesota	Rochester Mustangs (USHL)
10	F	John Morrison	180	84	April 6, 1945	Minneapolis, Minnesota	Yale University
14	F	Larry Pleau	180	84	June 29, 1947	Boston, Massachusetts	Montreal Junior Canadiens (OHL)
5	D	Donald Ross	180	83	October 11, 1942	Roseau, Minnesota	None
20	F	Larry Stordahl	175	77	October 23, 1942	Thief River Falls, Minnesota	Rochester Mustangs (USHL)
8	F	Doug Volmar	181	80	January 9, 1945	Cleveland, Ohio	Michigan State University

=== 1972 Winter Olympics ===
- Host City: Sapporo, Japan
- won silver medal

The following is the American roster for the men's ice hockey tournament at the 1972 Winter Olympics.

Head Coach: Murray Williamson

Pos	No.	Name	Height (cm)	Weight (kg)	Birthdate	Birthplace	Previous club/team
G	30	Mike Curran	175	78	April 14, 1944	International Falls, Minnesota	Green Bay Bobcats (USHL)
G	1	Peter Sears	180	82	March 14, 1947	Lake Placid, New York	Green Bay Bobcats (USHL)
D	7	Bruce McIntosh	183	79	March 17, 1949	Edina, MN	University of Minnesota
D	5	Charles Brown	186	89	October 26, 1947	Minneapolis, Minnesota	Bemidji State
D	23	Mark Howe	180	82	May 28, 1955	Detroit, Michigan	Detroit Junior Red Wings (SOJHL)
D	2	Jim McElmury	183	86	October 3, 1949	Saint Paul, Minnesota	Bemidji State
D	20	Dick McGlynn	183	86	June 19, 1948	Medford, Massachusetts	Colgate University
D	4	Tom Mellor	183	84	January 27, 1950	Cranston, Rhode Island	Boston College
D	3	Wally Olds	188	89	August 17, 1949	Warroad, Minnesota	University of Minnesota
D	9	Frank Sanders	188	98	March 8, 1949	Saint Paul, Minnesota	University of Minnesota
F	16	Kevin Ahearn	175	73	June 20, 1948	Milton, Massachusetts	Boston College
F	10	Henry Boucha	186	84	June 1, 1951	Warroad, Minnesota	Winnipeg Jets (WCHL)
F	8	Keith Christiansen	165	69	July 14, 1944	International Falls, Minnesota	Grand Rapids Bruins (USHL)
F	6	Robbie Ftorek	175	78	January 2, 1952	Needham, Massachusetts	Needham High School, Massachusetts
F	19	Stuart Irving	170	70	February 2, 1949	Beverly, Massachusetts	Beverly High School, Massachusetts
F	18	Ronald Naslund	186	86	February 28, 1943	Minneapolis, Minnesota	University of Denver
F	17	Craig Sarner	180	84	June 20, 1949	Saint Paul, Minnesota	University of Minnesota
F	15	Timothy Sheehy – C	186	86	September 3, 1948	Fort Frances, Ontario	Boston College
F	21	Larry Bader	188	91	September 12, 1949	Minnetonka, MN	University of Pennsylvania

=== 1976 Winter Olympics ===
- Host City: Innsbruck, Austria
- finished 5th

The following is the American roster for the men's ice hockey tournament at the 1976 Winter Olympics.

Head Coach: Bob Johnson

Assistant Coach: Grant Standbrook

No.	Pos	Name	Height (cm)	Weight (kg)	Birthdate	Birthplace	Previous club/team
1	G	Blane Comstock	178	73	November 3, 1949	Roseau, Minnesota	Warroad Lakers
12	D	Robert Harris	183	82	December 4, 1953	Omaha, Nebraska	University of Minnesota
24	D	Jeff Hymanson	188	89	March 11, 1954	Anoka, Minnesota	Albuquerque Chaparrals (SWHL)
6	D	Paul Jensen	180	82	May 1, 1955	Minneapolis, Minnesota	Michigan Tech
23	D	Dick Lamby	185	91	May 3, 1955	Worcester, Massachusetts	Salem State College
4	D	Gary Ross	183	91	December 8, 1953	Roseau, Minnesota	Bemidji State University
3	D	John Taft – C	188	88	March 8, 1954	Minneapolis, Minnesota	University of Wisconsin
11	F	Steve Alley	188	84	December 20, 1953	Minneapolis, Minnesota	University of Wisconsin
21	F	Dan Bolduc	175	86	April 6, 1953	Waterville, Maine	New England Whalers (WHA)
17	F	Bob Dobek	183	84	October 4, 1952	Detroit, Michigan	Bowling Green State University
10	F	Steve Jensen	188	86	April 14, 1955	Minneapolis, Minnesota	Michigan Tech
8	F	Bob Lundeen	180	84	November 4, 1952	Minneapolis, Minnesota	University of Wisconsin
15	F	Bob Miller	178	80	September 28, 1956	Medford, Massachusetts	University of New Hampshire
18	F	Doug Ross	175	77	October 9, 1951	Detroit, Michigan	Bowling Green State University
14	F	Buzz Schneider	180	82	September 14, 1954	Babbitt, Minnesota	University of Minnesota
7	F	Stephen Sertich – C	170	71	October 20, 1952	Virginia, Minnesota	EV Füssen (1.GBun)
16	F	Ted Thorndike	183	84	September 8, 1952	Boston, Massachusetts	Harvard University

=== 1980 Winter Olympics ===
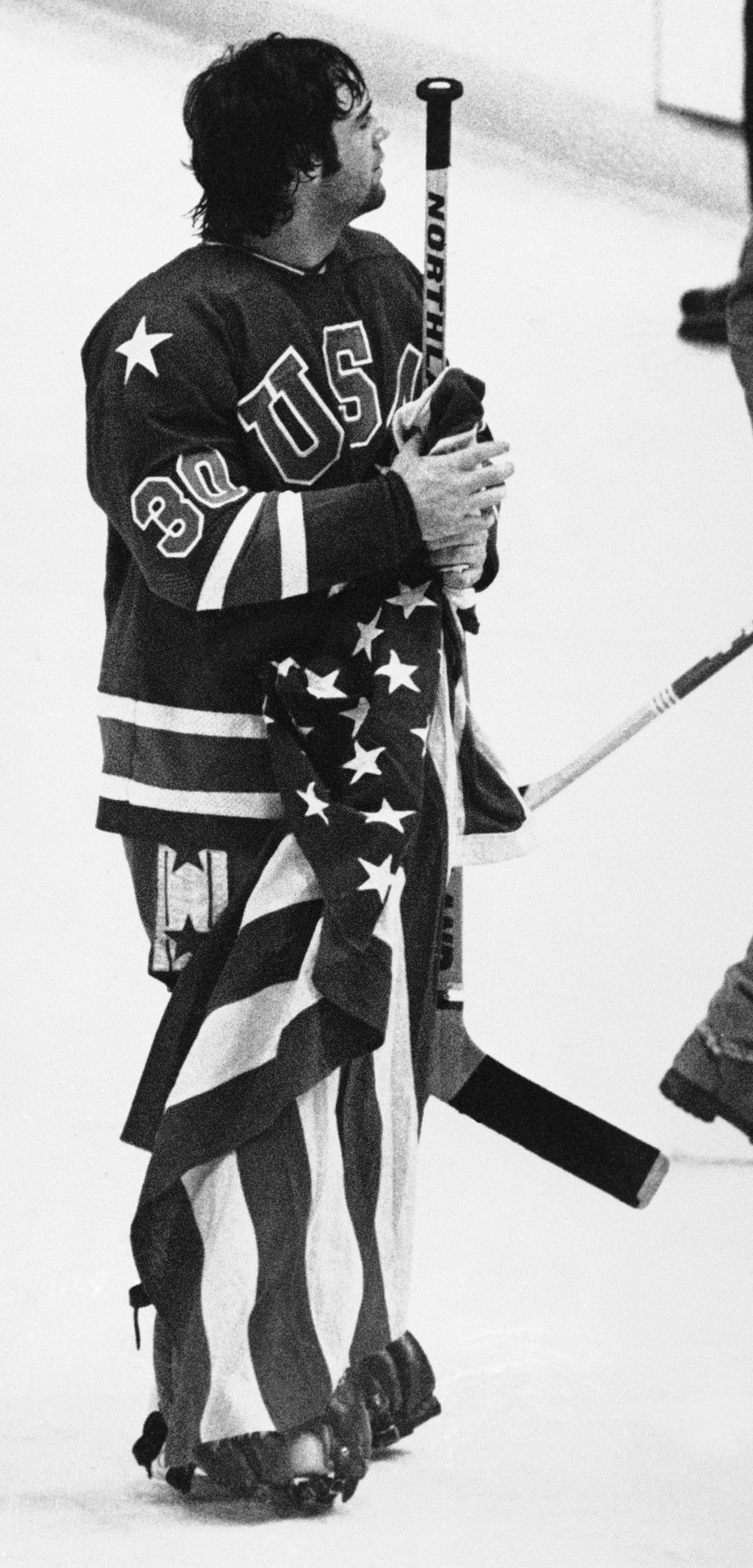
American goaltender Jim Craig holding the American flag following their gold medal victory

- Host City: Lake Placid, United States
- won gold medal

The following is the American roster for the men's ice hockey tournament at the 1980 Winter Olympics.

Head Coach: Herb Brooks

Assistant Coach: Craig Patrick

Pos	No.	Name	Height (cm)	Weight (kg)	Birthdate	Birthplace	Team
G	30	Jim Craig	185	86	3 May 1957	North Easton, Massachusetts	(United States) Boston University
G	1	Steve Janaszak	173	73	7 January 1957	Saint Paul, Minnesota	(United States) University of Minnesota
D	6	Bill Baker – A	185	88	29 November 1956	Grand Rapids, Minnesota	(United States) University of Minnesota
D	23	Dave Christian	180	77	12 May 1959	Warroad, Minnesota	(United States) University of North Dakota
D	3	Ken Morrow	193	95	17 October 1956	Flint, Michigan	(United States) Bowling Green State University
D	17	Jack O'Callahan	188	86	24 July 1957	Charlestown, Massachusetts	(United States) Boston University
D	5	Mike Ramsey	191	86	18 December 1960	Minneapolis, Minnesota	(United States) University of Minnesota
D	20	Bob Suter	175	81	16 May 1957	Madison, Wisconsin	(United States) University of Wisconsin
LW	24	Rob McClanahan	178	82	9 January 1958	Saint Paul, Minnesota	(United States) University of Minnesota
LW	25	Buzz Schneider	180	82	14 September 1954	Babbitt, Minnesota	(United States) University of Minnesota
LW	8	Dave Silk	180	86	1 January 1958	Scituate, Massachusetts	(United States) Boston University
LW	27	Phil Verchota	188	88	28 December 1958	Duluth, Minnesota	(United States) University of Minnesota
C	9	Neal Broten	175	70	29 November 1959	Roseau, Minnesota	(United States) University of Minnesota
C	10	Mark Johnson	175	73	22 September 1957	Minneapolis, Minnesota	(United States) University of Wisconsin
C	16	Mark Pavelich	170	73	28 February 1958	Eveleth, Minnesota	(United States) University of Minnesota-Duluth
C	15	Mark Wells	175	79	18 September 1957	St. Clair Shores, Michigan	(United States) Bowling Green State University
RW	11	Steve Christoff	185	82	23 January 1958	Richfield, Minnesota	(United States) University of Minnesota
RW	21	Mike Eruzione – C	178	84	25 October 1954	Winthrop, Massachusetts	(United States) Boston University
RW	28	John Harrington	178	82	27 May 1954	Virginia, Minnesota	(United States) University of Minnesota-Duluth
RW	19	Eric Strobel	178	79	5 June 1958	Rochester, Minnesota	(United States) University of Minnesota

=== 1984 Winter Olympics ===
- Host City: Sarajevo, Yugoslavia
- finished 7th

The following is the American roster for the men's ice hockey tournament at the 1984 Winter Olympics.

Head Coach: Lou Vairo

Assistant Coaches: Craig Patrick, Bob O'Connor, Dave Peterson, Tim Taylor, Doug Woog

Pos	No.	Name	Height (cm)	Weight (kg)	Birthdate	Birthplace	Previous club/team
G	29	Marc Behrend	185	84	January 11, 1961	Madison, Wisconsin	University of Wisconsin
G	1	Bob Mason	185	82	April 22, 1961	International Falls, Minnesota	University of Minnesota-Duluth
D	21	Chris Chelios	185	86	January 25, 1962	Evergreen Park, Illinois	University of Wisconsin
D	6	Mark Fusco	175	82	March 12, 1961	Woburn, Massachusetts	Harvard University
D	22	Tom Hirsch	193	95	January 27, 1963	Minneapolis, Minnesota	University of Minnesota
D	18	Al Iafrate	190	86	March 21, 1966	Dearborn, Michigan	Belleville Bulls (OHL)
D	28	David H. Jensen	185	86	May 3, 1961	Minneapolis, Minnesota	Birmingham South Stars (CHL)
F	17	Scott Bjugstad	185	84	June 2, 1961	Minneapolis, Minnesota	University of Minnesota
F	13	Bob Brooke	188	94	December 18, 1960	Melrose, Massachusetts	Yale University
F	9	Scott Fusco	175	79	January 21, 1963	Woburn, Massachusetts	Harvard University
F	10	Steve Griffith	178	84	March 12, 1961	Saint Paul, Minnesota	University of Minnesota
F	19	Paul Guay	183	88	September 2, 1963	Woonsocket, Rhode Island	Providence College
F	23	John Harrington	178	82	May 24, 1957	Virginia, Minnesota	University of Minnesota-Duluth
F	7	David A. Jensen	185	79	August 19, 1965	Newton, Massachusetts	Belmont Hill Academy (ISL)
F	25	Mark Kumpel	183	86	March 7, 1961	Wakefield, Massachusetts	University of Lowell
F	16	Pat LaFontaine	178	83	February 22, 1965	St. Louis, Missouri	Verdun Juniors (QMJHL)
F	26	Corey Millen	170	75	March 30, 1964	Cloquet, Minnesota	University of Minnesota
F	12	Ed Olczyk	185	89	August 16, 1966	Chicago, Illinois	Stratford Cullitons(GOJHL)
F	27	Gary Sampson	183	86	August 24, 1959	Atikokan, Ontario	Boston College
F	8	Phil Verchota – C	188	89	December 28, 1956	Preston, Minnesota	University of Minnesota

=== 1988 Winter Olympics ===
- Host City: Calgary, Canada
- finished 7th

The following is the American roster for the men's ice hockey tournament at the 1988 Winter Olympics.

Head Coach: Dave Peterson

Assistant Coaches: Jack Blatherwick, Ben Smith

Pos	No.	Name	Height (cm)	Weight (kg)	Birthdate	Birthplace	1986–1987 club/team
G	1	Mike Richter	180	84	September 22, 1966	Abington, Pennsylvania	University of Wisconsin
G	31	Chris Terreri	175	70	November 15, 1964	Providence, Rhode Island	Maine Mariners (AHL)
D	3	Greg Brown	183	86	March 7, 1968	Hartford, Connecticut	Boston College
D	23	Guy Gosselin	180	89	January 6, 1964	Rochester, Minnesota	University of Minnesota-Duluth
D	26	Peter Laviolette	188	90	December 7, 1964	Norwood, Massachusetts	Indianapolis Checkers (IHL)
D	2	Brian Leetch – C	185	91	March 3, 1968	Corpus Christi, Texas	Boston College
D	6	Jeff Norton	190	90	November 25, 1965	Arlington, Massachusetts	University of Michigan
D	27	Eric Weinrich	185	93	December 19, 1966	Roanoke, Virginia	University of Maine
LW	21	Tony Granato	178	84	July 25, 1964	Hinsdale, Illinois	University of Wisconsin
LW	19	Lane MacDonald	180	85	March 3, 1966	Tulsa, Oklahoma	Harvard University
LW	32	Kevin Stevens	190	98	April 15, 1965	Brockton, Massachusetts	Boston College
C	20	Allen Bourbeau	175	79	May 17, 1965	Worcester, Massachusetts	Harvard University
C	17	Clark Donatelli	178	85	October 22, 1965	Providence, Rhode Island	Boston University
C	9	Scott Fusco	175	79	January 21, 1963	Woburn, Massachusetts	Harvard University
C	15	Craig Janney	185	89	September 26, 1967	Hartford, Connecticut	Boston College
C	31	Jim Johannson	185	84	March 10, 1964	Rochester, Minnesota	Landsberg EV (2.GBun)
C	10	Corey Millen	170	75	March 30, 1964	Duluth, Minnesota	University of Minnesota
RW	28	Steve Leach	180	82	January 16, 1966	Cambridge, Massachusetts	Binghamton Whalers (AHL)
RW	8	Kevin Miller	178	82	September 2, 1965	Lansing, Michigan	Michigan State University
RW	11	Todd Okerlund	183	94	September 6, 1964	Burnsville, Minnesota	University of Minnesota
RW	22	Dave Snuggerud	188	85	June 20, 1966	Minneapolis, Minnesota	University of Minnesota
RW	14	Scott Young	185	91	October 1, 1967	Worcester, Massachusetts	Boston University

=== 1992 Winter Olympics ===
- Host City: Albertville, France
- finished 4th

The following is the American roster for the men's ice hockey tournament at the 1992 Winter Olympics.

Head Coach: Dave Peterson

Assistant Coaches: Keith Allain, Dean Blais

Pos	Name	Height (cm)	Weight (kg)	Birthdate	Birthplace	1990–1991 club/team
G	Ray LeBlanc	178	77	October 24, 1964	Fitchburg, Massachusetts	Indianapolis Ice (IHL)
G	Scott Gordon	178	79	February 6, 1963	Easton, Massachusetts	Halifax Citadels (AHL)
D	Greg Brown	183	86	March 7, 1968	Hartford, Connecticut	Rochester Americans (AHL)
D	Guy Gosselin	180	89	January 6, 1964	Rochester, Minnesota	None
D	Bret Hedican	188	89	August 10, 1970	Saint Paul, Minnesota	St. Cloud State
D	Sean Hill	183	92	February 14, 1970	Duluth, Minnesota	University of Wisconsin
D	Scott Lachance	188	93	October 22, 1972	Charlottesville, Virginia	Boston University
D	Moe Mantha, Jr.	188	96	January 21, 1961	Lakewood, California	Winnipeg Jets
D	Dave Tretowicz	180	89	March 15, 1969	Pittsfield, Massachusetts	Clarkson University
LW	Ted Donato	178	82	April 28, 1969	Boston, Massachusetts	Harvard University
LW	Shawn McEachern	183	86	February 28, 1969	Waltham, Massachusetts	Boston University
LW	Marty McInnis	183	84	June 2, 1970	Weymouth, Massachusetts	Boston College
LW	Tim Sweeney	180	84	April 12, 1967	Boston, Massachusetts	Salt Lake Golden Eagles (IHL)
C	Clark Donatelli – C	178	85	October 22, 1965	Providence, Rhode Island	San Diego Gulls (IHL)
C	Ted Drury	183	86	September 13, 1971	Boston, Massachusetts	Harvard
C	Jim Johannson	185	84	March 10, 1964	Rochester, Minnesota	Indianapolis Ice (IHL)
C	Keith Tkachuk	188	102	March 28, 1972	Melrose, Massachusetts	Boston University
RW	David Emma	175	79	January 14, 1969	Cranston, Rhode Island	Boston College
RW	Steve Heinze	183	86	January 30, 1970	Lawrence, Massachusetts	Boston College
RW	Joe Sacco	185	89	February 4, 1969	Medford, Massachusetts	Newmarket Saints (AHL)
RW	C. J. Young	178	84	January 1, 1968	Newton, Massachusetts	Salt Lake Golden Eagles (IHL)
RW	Scott Young	185	91	October 1, 1967	Worcester, Massachusetts	Pittsburgh Penguins

=== 1994 Winter Olympics ===
- Host City: Lillehammer, Norway
- finished 8th

The following is the American roster for the men's ice hockey tournament at the 1994 Winter Olympics.

Head Coach: Tim Taylor

Associate Coach: John Cunniff

Pos	Name	Height (cm)	Weight (kg)	Birthdate	Birthplace	1993–1994 club/team
G	Mike Dunham	190	91	June 1, 1972	Johnson City, New York	Albany River Rats (AHL)
G	Garth Snow	193	89	July 28, 1969	Wrentham, Massachusetts	Cornwall Aces (AHL)
D	Ted Crowley	188	85	May 3, 1970	Concord, Massachusetts	Hartford Whalers
D	Brett Hauer	188	91	July 11, 1971	Richfield, Minnesota	Las Vegas Thunder (IHL)
D	Chris Imes	180	89	August 27, 1972	Birchdale, Minnesota	University of Maine
D	Peter Laviolette – C	188	90	December 7, 1964	Norwood, Massachusetts	San Diego Gulls (IHL)
D	Matt Martin	193	95	April 30, 1971	Hamden, Connecticut	St. John's Maple Leafs (AHL)
D	Travis Richards	188	89	March 22, 1970	Crystal, Minnesota	Kalamazoo Wings (IHL)
D	Barry Richter	188	93	September 11, 1970	Madison, Wisconsin	Binghamton Rangers (AHL)
LW	Craig Johnson	188	86	March 18, 1972	Saint Paul, Minnesota	University of Minnesota
LW	Todd Marchant	178	75	August 12, 1973	Buffalo, New York	Cape Breton Oilers (AHL)
LW	David Roberts	183	84	May 28, 1970	Alameda, California	Peoria Rivermen (IHL)
LW	Brian Rolston	188	95	February 21, 1973	Flint, Michigan	Albany River Rats (AHL)
C	Mark Beaufait	175	75	May 13, 1970	Livonia, Michigan	Kansas City Blades (IHL)
C	Peter Ciavaglia	178	79	July 15, 1969	Albany, New York	Leksands IF (SEL)
C	Ted Drury	183	86	September 13, 1971	Boston, Massachusetts	Calgary Flames
C	Darby Hendrickson	185	86	August 28, 1972	Richfield, Minnesota	St. John's Maple Leafs (AHL)
C	David Sacco	178	84	July 31, 1970	Malden, Massachusetts	St. John's Maple Leafs (AHL)
RW	Jeff Lazaro	178	82	March 21, 1968	Waltham, Massachusetts	Providence Bruins (AHL)
RW	Jim Campbell	190	93	April 3, 1973	Worcester, Massachusetts	Fredericton Canadiens (AHL)
RW	Peter Ferraro	178	79	January 24, 1973	Port Jefferson, New York	University of Maine
RW	John Lilley	175	77	August 3, 1972	Wakefield, Massachusetts	San Diego Gulls (IHL)

=== 1998 Winter Olympics ===
- Host City: Nagano, Japan
- finished 6th

The following is the United States roster for the men's ice hockey tournament at the 1998 Winter Olympics.

Head coach: Ron Wilson

Assistant coaches: John Cunniff, Paul Holmgren, Jeff Jackson

No.	Pos.	Name	Height	Weight	Birthdate	Team
2	D	Brian Leetch (A)	6 ft 1 in (185 cm)	187 lb (85 kg)	March 3, 1968 (aged 29)	(United States) New York Rangers
3	D	Derian Hatcher	6 ft 5 in (196 cm)	245 lb (111 kg)	June 4, 1972 (aged 25)	(United States) Dallas Stars
4	D	Kevin Hatcher	6 ft 3 in (191 cm)	231 lb (105 kg)	September 9, 1966 (aged 31)	(United States) Pittsburgh Penguins
5	D	Mathieu Schneider	5 ft 11 in (180 cm)	192 lb (87 kg)	June 12, 1969 (aged 28)	(Canada) Toronto Maple Leafs
6	D	Bryan Berard	6 ft 2 in (188 cm)	220 lb (100 kg)	March 5, 1977 (aged 20)	(United States) New York Islanders
7	D	Chris Chelios (C)	5 ft 11 in (180 cm)	191 lb (87 kg)	January 25, 1962 (aged 36)	(United States) Chicago Blackhawks
9	F	Mike Modano	6 ft 3 in (191 cm)	210 lb (95 kg)	June 7, 1970 (aged 27)	(United States) Dallas Stars
10	F	John LeClair	6 ft 3 in (191 cm)	225 lb (102 kg)	July 5, 1969 (aged 28)	(United States) Philadelphia Flyers
11	F	Tony Amonte	6 ft 0 in (183 cm)	202 lb (92 kg)	August 2, 1970 (aged 27)	(United States) Chicago Blackhawks
12	F	Bill Guerin	6 ft 2 in (188 cm)	220 lb (100 kg)	November 9, 1970 (aged 27)	(Canada) Edmonton Oilers
15	F	Brett Hull	5 ft 11 in (180 cm)	201 lb (91 kg)	August 9, 1964 (aged 33)	(United States) St. Louis Blues
16	F	Pat LaFontaine	5 ft 10 in (178 cm)	181 lb (82 kg)	February 22, 1965 (aged 32)	(United States) New York Rangers
17	F	Keith Tkachuk (A)	6 ft 2 in (188 cm)	235 lb (107 kg)	March 28, 1972 (aged 25)	(United States) Phoenix Coyotes
18	F	Adam Deadmarsh	6 ft 0 in (183 cm)	205 lb (93 kg)	May 10, 1975 (aged 22)	(United States) Colorado Avalanche
19	F	Doug Weight	5 ft 11 in (180 cm)	196 lb (89 kg)	January 21, 1971 (aged 27)	(Canada) Edmonton Oilers
20	D	Gary Suter	6 ft 0 in (183 cm)	205 lb (93 kg)	June 24, 1964 (aged 33)	(United States) Chicago Blackhawks
24	D	Keith Carney	6 ft 1 in (185 cm)	207 lb (94 kg)	February 3, 1970 (aged 28)	(United States) Chicago Blackhawks
25	F	Jamie Langenbrunner	6 ft 1 in (185 cm)	202 lb (92 kg)	July 24, 1975 (aged 22)	(United States) Dallas Stars
27	F	Jeremy Roenick	6 ft 1 in (185 cm)	205 lb (93 kg)	January 17, 1970 (aged 28)	(United States) Phoenix Coyotes
29	F	Joel Otto	6 ft 5 in (196 cm)	220 lb (100 kg)	October 29, 1961 (aged 36)	(United States) Philadelphia Flyers
31	G	Guy Hebert	5 ft 11 in (180 cm)	185 lb (84 kg)	January 7, 1967 (aged 31)	(United States) Mighty Ducks of Anaheim
34	G	John Vanbiesbrouck	5 ft 8 in (173 cm)	176 lb (80 kg)	September 4, 1963 (aged 34)	(United States) Florida Panthers
35	G	Mike Richter	5 ft 11 in (180 cm)	185 lb (84 kg)	September 22, 1966 (aged 31)	(United States) New York Rangers

=== 2002 Winter Olympics ===
- Host City: Salt Lake City, United States
- won silver medal

Head coach: Herb Brooks

Assistant coach: John Cunniff, Lou Vairo

No.	Pos.	Name	Height	Weight	Birthdate	Team
1	G	Mike Dunham	6 ft 2 in (188 cm)	201 lb (91 kg)	June 1, 1972 (aged 29)	(United States) Nashville Predators
2	D	Brian Leetch (A)	6 ft 1 in (185 cm)	187 lb (85 kg)	March 3, 1968 (aged 33)	(United States) New York Rangers
33	D	Aaron Miller	6 ft 3 in (191 cm)	209 lb (95 kg)	August 11, 1971 (aged 30)	(United States) Los Angeles Kings
5	D	Tom Poti	6 ft 3 in (191 cm)	209 lb (95 kg)	March 22, 1977 (aged 24)	(Canada) Edmonton Oilers
6	D	Phil Housley (A)	5 ft 10 in (178 cm)	179 lb (81 kg)	March 9, 1964 (aged 37)	(United States) Chicago Blackhawks
7	F	Keith Tkachuk	6 ft 2 in (188 cm)	235 lb (107 kg)	March 28, 1972 (aged 29)	(United States) St. Louis Blues
9	F	Mike Modano	6 ft 3 in (191 cm)	210 lb (95 kg)	June 7, 1970 (aged 31)	(United States) Dallas Stars
10	F	John LeClair	6 ft 3 in (191 cm)	225 lb (102 kg)	July 5, 1969 (aged 32)	(United States) Philadelphia Flyers
11	F	Tony Amonte	6 ft 0 in (183 cm)	202 lb (92 kg)	August 2, 1970 (aged 31)	(United States) Chicago Blackhawks
12	F	Brian Rolston	6 ft 2 in (188 cm)	214 lb (97 kg)	February 21, 1973 (aged 28)	(United States) Boston Bruins
13	F	Bill Guerin	6 ft 2 in (188 cm)	220 lb (100 kg)	November 9, 1970 (aged 31)	(United States) Boston Bruins
16	F	Brett Hull	5 ft 11 in (180 cm)	201 lb (91 kg)	August 9, 1964 (aged 37)	(United States) Detroit Red Wings
18	F	Adam Deadmarsh	6 ft 0 in (183 cm)	205 lb (93 kg)	May 10, 1975 (aged 26)	(United States) Los Angeles Kings
20	D	Gary Suter	6 ft 0 in (183 cm)	205 lb (93 kg)	June 24, 1964 (aged 37)	(United States) San Jose Sharks
24	D	Chris Chelios (C)	5 ft 11 in (180 cm)	191 lb (87 kg)	January 25, 1962 (aged 40)	(United States) Detroit Red Wings
3	D	Brian Rafalski	5 ft 10 in (178 cm)	192 lb (87 kg)	September 28, 1973 (aged 28)	(United States) New Jersey Devils
30	G	Tom Barrasso	6 ft 3 in (191 cm)	209 lb (95 kg)	March 31, 1965 (aged 36)	(United States) Carolina Hurricanes
35	G	Mike Richter	5 ft 11 in (180 cm)	185 lb (84 kg)	September 22, 1966 (aged 35)	(United States) New York Rangers
37	F	Chris Drury	5 ft 10 in (178 cm)	190 lb (86 kg)	August 20, 1976 (aged 25)	(United States) Colorado Avalanche
39	F	Doug Weight	5 ft 11 in (180 cm)	196 lb (89 kg)	January 21, 1971 (aged 31)	(United States) St. Louis Blues
48	F	Scott Young	6 ft 1 in (185 cm)	201 lb (91 kg)	October 1, 1967 (aged 34)	(United States) St. Louis Blues
61	F	Mike York	5 ft 10 in (178 cm)	183 lb (83 kg)	January 3, 1978 (aged 24)	(United States) New York Rangers
97	F	Jeremy Roenick	6 ft 1 in (185 cm)	205 lb (93 kg)	January 17, 1970 (aged 32)	(United States) Philadelphia Flyers

=== 2006 Winter Olympics ===
- Host City: Turin, Italy
- finished 8th

The following is the American roster for the men's ice hockey tournament at the 2006 Winter Olympics.

Head coach: Peter Laviolette

Assistant Coaches: Keith Allain, Mike Sullivan

No.	Pos.	Name	Height	Weight	Birthdate	Birthplace	2005–06 team
29	G	Rick DiPietro	180 cm (5 ft 11 in)	84 kg (185 lb)	19 September 1981	Winthrop, MA	New York Islanders (NHL)
42	G	Robert Esche	185 cm (6 ft 1 in)	95 kg (209 lb)	22 January 1978	Utica, NY	Philadelphia Flyers (NHL)
47	G	John Grahame	188 cm (6 ft 2 in)	95 kg (209 lb)	31 August 1975	Denver, CO	Tampa Bay Lightning (NHL)
24	D	Chris Chelios – C	185 cm (6 ft 1 in)	86 kg (190 lb)	25 January 1962	Chicago, IL	Detroit Red Wings (NHL)
2	D	Derian Hatcher	196 cm (6 ft 5 in)	107 kg (236 lb)	4 June 1972	Sterling Heights, MI	Philadelphia Flyers (NHL)
4	D	Jordan Leopold	185 cm (6 ft 1 in)	93 kg (205 lb)	3 August 1980	Golden Valley, MN	Calgary Flames (NHL)
27	D	John-Michael Liles	178 cm (5 ft 10 in)	84 kg (185 lb)	25 November 1980	Zionsville, IN	Colorado Avalanche (NHL)
6	D	Bret Hedican	188 cm (6 ft 2 in)	93 kg (205 lb)	10 August 1970	St. Paul, MN	Carolina Hurricanes (NHL)
28	D	Brian Rafalski	175 cm (5 ft 9 in)	86 kg (190 lb)	28 September 1973	Dearborn, MI	New Jersey Devils (NHL)
23	D	Mathieu Schneider	180 cm (5 ft 11 in)	85 kg (187 lb)	12 June 1969	New York, NY	Detroit Red Wings (NHL)
55	F	Jason Blake	178 cm (5 ft 10 in)	82 kg (181 lb)	2 September 1973	Moorhead, MN	New York Islanders (NHL)
26	F	Erik Cole	188 cm (6 ft 2 in)	91 kg (201 lb)	6 November 1978	Oswego, NY	Carolina Hurricanes (NHL)
22	F	Craig Conroy	188 cm (6 ft 2 in)	91 kg (201 lb)	4 September 1971	Potsdam, NY	Los Angeles Kings (NHL)
18	F	Chris Drury	178 cm (5 ft 10 in)	82 kg (181 lb)	20 August 1976	Trumbull, CT	Buffalo Sabres (NHL)
14	F	Brian Gionta	170 cm (5 ft 7 in)	79 kg (174 lb)	18 January 1979	Rochester, NY	New Jersey Devils (NHL)
11	F	Scott Gomez	180 cm (5 ft 11 in)	91 kg (201 lb)	23 December 1979	Anchorage, AK	New Jersey Devils (NHL)
13	F	Bill Guerin	188 cm (6 ft 2 in)	95 kg (209 lb)	9 November 1970	Wilbraham, MA	Dallas Stars (NHL)
21	F	Mike Knuble	191 cm (6 ft 3 in)	103 kg (227 lb)	4 July 1972	Toronto, Ontario, Canada	Philadelphia Flyers (NHL)
9	F	Mike Modano	191 cm (6 ft 3 in)	93 kg (205 lb)	7 June 1970	Livonia, MI	Dallas Stars (NHL)
37	F	Mark Parrish	183 cm (6 ft 0 in)	91 kg (201 lb)	2 February 1977	Minneapolis, MN	New York Islanders (NHL)
12	F	Brian Rolston	188 cm (6 ft 2 in)	95 kg (209 lb)	21 February 1973	Flint, MI	Minnesota Wild (NHL)
7	F	Keith Tkachuk	188 cm (6 ft 2 in)	102 kg (225 lb)	28 March 1972	Melrose, MA	St. Louis Blues (NHL)
39	F	Doug Weight	180 cm (5 ft 11 in)	91 kg (201 lb)	21 January 1971	Warren, MI	St. Louis Blues (NHL)

=== 2010 Winter Olympics ===
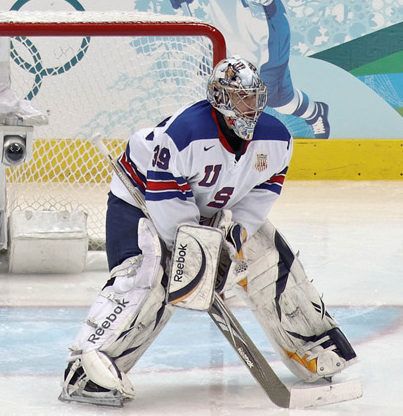
Goaltender Ryan Miller would be named most valuable player (MVP) at the 2010 Winter Olympics

- Host City: Vancouver, Canada
- won silver medal

The following is the American roster in the men's ice hockey tournament of the 2010 Winter Olympics.

No.	Pos.	Name	Height	Weight	Birthdate	Birthplace	2009–10 team
39	G	Ryan Miller	188 cm (6 ft 2 in)	75 kg (165 lb)	17 July 1980	East Lansing, MI	(United States) Buffalo Sabres (NHL)
29	G	Jonathan Quick	185 cm (6 ft 1 in)	91 kg (201 lb)	21 January 1986	Hamden, CT	(United States) Los Angeles Kings (NHL)
30	G	Tim Thomas	180 cm (5 ft 11 in)	91 kg (201 lb)	15 April 1974	Davison, MI	(United States) Boston Bruins (NHL)
4	D	Tim Gleason	183 cm (6 ft 0 in)	98 kg (216 lb)	29 January 1983	Clawson, MI	(United States) Carolina Hurricanes (NHL)
6	D	Erik Johnson	193 cm (6 ft 4 in)	107 kg (236 lb)	21 March 1988	Bloomington, MN	(United States) St. Louis Blues (NHL)
3	D	Jack Johnson	185 cm (6 ft 1 in)	102 kg (225 lb)	13 January 1987	Indianapolis, IN	(United States) Los Angeles Kings (NHL)
44	D	Brooks Orpik	188 cm (6 ft 2 in)	99 kg (218 lb)	26 September 1980	San Francisco, CA	(United States) Pittsburgh Penguins (NHL)
28	D	Brian Rafalski – A	178 cm (5 ft 10 in)	87 kg (192 lb)	28 September 1973	Dearborn, MI	(United States) Detroit Red Wings (NHL)
20	D	Ryan Suter – A	185 cm (6 ft 1 in)	88 kg (194 lb)	21 January 1985	Madison, WI	(United States) Nashville Predators (NHL)
19	D	Ryan Whitney	190 cm (6 ft 3 in)	95 kg (209 lb)	19 February 1983	Scituate, MA	(United States) Anaheim Ducks (NHL)
42	F	David Backes	191 cm (6 ft 3 in)	102 kg (225 lb)	1 May 1984	Blaine, MN	(United States) St. Louis Blues (NHL)
32	F	Dustin Brown – A	183 cm (6 ft 0 in)	94 kg (207 lb)	4 November 1984	Ithaca, NY	(United States) Los Angeles Kings (NHL)
24	F	Ryan Callahan	180 cm (5 ft 11 in)	84 kg (185 lb)	21 March 1985	Rochester, NY	(United States) New York Rangers (NHL)
23	F	Chris Drury	179 cm (5 ft 10 in)	86 kg (190 lb)	20 August 1976	Trumbull, CT	(United States) New York Rangers (NHL)
88	F	Patrick Kane	178 cm (5 ft 10 in)	81 kg (179 lb)	19 November 1988	Buffalo, NY	(United States) Chicago Blackhawks (NHL)
17	F	Ryan Kesler	188 cm (6 ft 2 in)	92 kg (203 lb)	31 August 1984	Livonia, MI	(Canada) Vancouver Canucks (NHL)
81	F	Phil Kessel	180 cm (5 ft 11 in)	82 kg (181 lb)	2 October 1987	Madison, WI	(Canada) Toronto Maple Leafs (NHL)
15	F	Jamie Langenbrunner – C	185 cm (6 ft 1 in)	91 kg (201 lb)	24 July 1975	Cloquet, MN	(United States) New Jersey Devils (NHL)
12	F	Ryan Malone	193 cm (6 ft 4 in)	102 kg (225 lb)	1 December 1979	Pittsburgh, PA	(United States) Tampa Bay Lightning (NHL)
9	F	Zach Parise – A	180 cm (5 ft 11 in)	86 kg (190 lb)	28 July 1984	Prior Lake, MN	(United States) New Jersey Devils (NHL)
16	F	Joe Pavelski	180 cm (5 ft 11 in)	88 kg (194 lb)	11 July 1984	Plover, WI	(United States) San Jose Sharks (NHL)
54	F	Bobby Ryan	188 cm (6 ft 2 in)	97 kg (214 lb)	17 March 1987	Cherry Hill, NJ	(United States) Anaheim Ducks (NHL)
26	F	Paul Stastny	183 cm (6 ft 0 in)	93 kg (205 lb)	27 December 1985	Quebec City, QC, Canada	(United States) Colorado Avalanche (NHL)

Defensemen Paul Martin and Mike Komisarek were initially selected, but due to injuries were replaced by Ryan Whitney and Tim Gleason.

=== 2014 Winter Olympics ===
- Host City: Sochi, Russia
- finished 4th

The following is the American roster in the men's ice hockey tournament of the 2014 Winter Olympics.

No.	Pos.	Name	Height	Weight	Birthdate	Birthplace	2013–14 team
3	D	Cam Fowler	6 ft 1 in (185 cm)	196 lb (89 kg)	5 December 1991	Windsor, ON	(United States) Anaheim Ducks (NHL)
4	D	John Carlson	6 ft 3 in (191 cm)	212 lb (96 kg)	10 January 1990	Colonia, NJ	(United States) Washington Capitals (NHL)
7	D	Paul Martin	6 ft 1 in (185 cm)	200 lb (91 kg)	5 March 1981	Elk River, MN	(United States) Pittsburgh Penguins (NHL)
8	F	Joe Pavelski	5 ft 11 in (180 cm)	190 lb (86 kg)	11 July 1984	Plover, WI	(United States) San Jose Sharks (NHL)
9	F	Zach Parise – C	5 ft 11 in (180 cm)	190 lb (86 kg)	28 July 1984	Prior Lake, MN	(United States) Minnesota Wild (NHL)
12	F	Derek Stepan	6 ft 1 in (185 cm)	196 lb (89 kg)	18 June 1990	Hastings, MN	(United States) New York Rangers (NHL)
17	F	Ryan Kesler	6 ft 2 in (188 cm)	202 lb (92 kg)	31 August 1984	Livonia, MI	(Canada) Vancouver Canucks (NHL)
20	D	Ryan Suter – A	6 ft 1 in (185 cm)	198 lb (90 kg)	21 January 1985	Madison, WI	(United States) Minnesota Wild (NHL)
21	F	James van Riemsdyk	6 ft 3 in (191 cm)	200 lb (91 kg)	4 May 1989	Middletown, NJ	(Canada) Toronto Maple Leafs (NHL)
22	D	Kevin Shattenkirk	5 ft 11 in (180 cm)	207 lb (94 kg)	29 January 1989	Greenwich, CT	(United States) St. Louis Blues (NHL)
23	F	Dustin Brown – A	6 ft 1 in (185 cm)	212 lb (96 kg)	4 November 1984	Ithaca, NY	(United States) Los Angeles Kings (NHL)
24	F	Ryan Callahan	5 ft 11 in (180 cm)	180 lb (82 kg)	21 March 1985	Rochester, NY	(United States) New York Rangers (NHL)
26	F	Paul Stastny	6 ft 1 in (185 cm)	205 lb (93 kg)	27 December 1985	Quebec City, QC	(United States) Colorado Avalanche (NHL)
27	D	Ryan McDonagh	6 ft 1 in (185 cm)	213 lb (97 kg)	13 June 1989	St. Paul, MN	(United States) New York Rangers (NHL)
28	F	Blake Wheeler	6 ft 5 in (196 cm)	205 lb (93 kg)	31 August 1986	Robbinsdale, MN	(Canada) Winnipeg Jets (NHL)
32	G	Jonathan Quick	6 ft 1 in (185 cm)	218 lb (99 kg)	21 January 1986	Milford, CT	(United States) Los Angeles Kings (NHL)
35	G	Jimmy Howard	6 ft 0 in (183 cm)	218 lb (99 kg)	26 March 1984	Syracuse, NY	(United States) Detroit Red Wings (NHL)
39	G	Ryan Miller	6 ft 2 in (188 cm)	175 lb (79 kg)	17 July 1980	East Lansing, MI	(United States) Buffalo Sabres (NHL)
42	F	David Backes	6 ft 3 in (191 cm)	221 lb (100 kg)	1 May 1984	Minneapolis, MN	(United States) St. Louis Blues (NHL)
44	D	Brooks Orpik	6 ft 2 in (188 cm)	219 lb (99 kg)	26 September 1980	San Francisco, CA	(United States) Pittsburgh Penguins (NHL)
67	F	Max Pacioretty	6 ft 2 in (188 cm)	219 lb (99 kg)	20 November 1988	New Canaan, CT	(Canada) Montreal Canadiens (NHL)
72	D	Justin Faulk	6 ft 0 in (183 cm)	215 lb (98 kg)	20 March 1992	S. St. Paul, MN	(United States) Carolina Hurricanes (NHL)
74	F	T. J. Oshie	5 ft 11 in (180 cm)	189 lb (86 kg)	23 December 1986	Everett, WA	(United States) St. Louis Blues (NHL)
81	F	Phil Kessel	6 ft 1 in (185 cm)	202 lb (92 kg)	2 October 1987	Madison, WI	(Canada) Toronto Maple Leafs (NHL)
88	F	Patrick Kane	5 ft 11 in (180 cm)	181 lb (82 kg)	19 November 1988	Buffalo, NY	(United States) Chicago Blackhawks (NHL)

=== 2018 Winter Olympics ===
- Host City: Pyeongchang, South Korea
- finished 7th

The following is the American roster for the men's ice hockey tournament at the 2018 Winter Olympics.

Head coach: (United States) Tony Granato Assistant coaches: (United States) Keith Allain, (United States) Chris Chelios, (United States) Scott Young

No.	Pos.	Name	Height	Weight	Birthdate	Birthplace	2017–18 team
4	D	Chad Billins	5 ft 8 in (173 cm)	174 lb (79 kg)	May 26, 1989	Marysville, Michigan	(Sweden) Linköpings HC (SHL)
5	D	Noah Welch – A	6 ft 4 in (193 cm)	220 lb (100 kg)	August 26, 1982	Brighton, Massachusetts	(Sweden) Växjö Lakers (SHL)
7	F	John McCarthy	6 ft 1 in (185 cm)	194 lb (88 kg)	August 9, 1986	Boston, Massachusetts	(United States) San Jose Barracuda (AHL)
9	F	Brian O'Neill	5 ft 9 in (175 cm)	172 lb (78 kg)	June 1, 1988	Yardley, Pennsylvania	(Finland) Jokerit (KHL)
11	F	Garrett Roe	5 ft 8 in (173 cm)	181 lb (82 kg)	February 22, 1988	Vienna, Virginia	(Switzerland) EV Zug (NL)
12	F	Brian Gionta – C	5 ft 7 in (170 cm)	179 lb (81 kg)	January 18, 1979	Rochester, New York	Free agent
13	D	Ryan Gunderson	5 ft 10 in (178 cm)	174 lb (79 kg)	August 16, 1985	Bensalem, Pennsylvania	(Sweden) Brynäs IF (SHL)
14	F	Broc Little	5 ft 9 in (175 cm)	170 lb (77 kg)	March 24, 1988	Phoenix, Arizona	(Switzerland) HC Davos (NL)
15	F	Bobby Butler	6 ft 0 in (183 cm)	190 lb (86 kg)	April 26, 1987	Marlborough, Massachusetts	(United States) Milwaukee Admirals (AHL)
16	F	Ryan Donato	6 ft 0 in (183 cm)	192 lb (87 kg)	April 9, 1996	Scituate, Massachusetts	(United States) Harvard Crimson (ECAC)
17	F	Chris Bourque	5 ft 8 in (173 cm)	174 lb (79 kg)	January 29, 1986	Boston, Massachusetts	(United States) Hershey Bears (AHL)
18	F	Jordan Greenway	6 ft 6 in (198 cm)	227 lb (103 kg)	February 16, 1997	Canton, New York	(United States) Boston University Terriers (HE)
19	F	Jim Slater	6 ft 0 in (183 cm)	190 lb (86 kg)	December 9, 1982	Lapeer, Michigan	(Switzerland) HC Fribourg-Gottéron (NL)
20	D	Will Borgen	6 ft 2 in (188 cm)	187 lb (85 kg)	December 19, 1996	Moorhead, Minnesota	(United States) St. Cloud State Huskies (NCHC)
21	D	James Wisniewski	5 ft 11 in (180 cm)	203 lb (92 kg)	February 21, 1984	Canton, Michigan	(Germany) EC Kassel Huskies (DEL2)
22	D	Bobby Sanguinetti	6 ft 3 in (191 cm)	190 lb (86 kg)	February 29, 1988	Trenton, New Jersey	(Switzerland) HC Lugano (NL)
23	F	Troy Terry	6 ft 1 in (185 cm)	174 lb (79 kg)	September 10, 1997	Highlands Ranch, Colorado	(United States) Denver Pioneers (NCHC)
24	D	Jonathon Blum	6 ft 1 in (185 cm)	187 lb (85 kg)	January 30, 1989	Long Beach, California	(Russia) HC Sochi (KHL)
26	F	Mark Arcobello	5 ft 8 in (173 cm)	174 lb (79 kg)	August 12, 1988	Milford, Connecticut	(Switzerland) SC Bern (NL)
30	G	Ryan Zapolski	6 ft 0 in (183 cm)	203 lb (92 kg)	November 11, 1986	Erie, Pennsylvania	(Finland) Jokerit (KHL)
31	G	Brandon Maxwell	6 ft 1 in (185 cm)	196 lb (89 kg)	March 22, 1991	Winter Park, Florida	(Czech Republic) BK Mladá Boleslav (ELH)
35	G	David Leggio	6 ft 0 in (183 cm)	185 lb (84 kg)	July 31, 1984	Williamsville, New York	(Germany) EHC Red Bull München (DEL)
42	F	Chad Kolarik	5 ft 11 in (180 cm)	183 lb (83 kg)	January 26, 1986	Abington, Pennsylvania	(Germany) Adler Mannheim (DEL)
94	F	Ryan Stoa	6 ft 3 in (191 cm)	212 lb (96 kg)	April 13, 1987	Bloomington, Minnesota	(Russia) HC Spartak Moscow (KHL)
97	D	Matt Gilroy – A	6 ft 2 in (188 cm)	203 lb (92 kg)	July 30, 1984	North Bellmore, New York	(Finland) Jokerit (KHL)

=== 2022 Winter Olympics ===
- Host City: Beijing, China
- finished 5th

The following is the American roster in the men's ice hockey tournament of the 2022 Winter Olympics. The roster was announced on January 13, 2022.

Head coach: David Quinn

No.	Pos.	Name	Height	Weight	Birthdate	Team
4	D	Drew Helleson	6 ft 3 in (191 cm)	190 lb (86 kg)	March 26, 2001 (aged 20)	(United States) Boston College Eagles
5	D	David Warsofsky	5 ft 9 in (175 cm)	171 lb (78 kg)	May 30, 1990 (aged 31)	(Germany) ERC Ingolstadt
6	D	Nick Perbix	6 ft 4 in (193 cm)	201 lb (91 kg)	June 15, 1998 (aged 23)	(United States) St. Cloud State Huskies
8	D	Jake Sanderson	6 ft 2 in (188 cm)	185 lb (84 kg)	July 8, 2002 (aged 19)	(United States) North Dakota Fighting Hawks
10	F	Matty Beniers	6 ft 1 in (185 cm)	175 lb (79 kg)	November 5, 2002 (aged 19)	(United States) Michigan Wolverines
11	F	Kenny Agostino	6 ft 0 in (183 cm)	202 lb (92 kg)	April 30, 1992 (aged 29)	(Russia) Torpedo Nizhny Novgorod
12	F	Sam Hentges	6 ft 0 in (183 cm)	174 lb (79 kg)	July 26, 1999 (aged 22)	(United States) St. Cloud State Huskies
13	F	Nathan Smith	6 ft 1 in (185 cm)	190 lb (86 kg)	October 18, 1998 (aged 23)	(United States) Minnesota State Mavericks
14	D	Brock Faber	6 ft 0 in (183 cm)	190 lb (86 kg)	August 22, 2002 (aged 19)	(United States) Minnesota Golden Gophers
16	F	Nick Abruzzese	5 ft 10 in (178 cm)	174 lb (79 kg)	June 4, 1999 (aged 22)	(United States) Harvard Crimson
19	F	Brendan Brisson	6 ft 0 in (183 cm)	180 lb (82 kg)	October 22, 2001 (aged 20)	(United States) Michigan Wolverines
20	D	Steven Kampfer (A)	5 ft 11 in (180 cm)	197 lb (89 kg)	September 24, 1988 (aged 33)	(Russia) Ak Bars Kazan
21	F	Brian O'Neill	5 ft 9 in (175 cm)	175 lb (79 kg)	June 1, 1988 (aged 33)	(Finland) Jokerit
23	D	Brian Cooper	5 ft 10 in (178 cm)	196 lb (89 kg)	November 1, 1993 (aged 28)	(Sweden) IK Oskarshamn
25	F	Marc McLaughlin	6 ft 0 in (183 cm)	205 lb (93 kg)	July 26, 1999 (aged 22)	(United States) Boston College Eagles
26	F	Sean Farrell	5 ft 9 in (175 cm)	174 lb (79 kg)	November 2, 2001 (aged 20)	(United States) Harvard Crimson
27	F	Noah Cates (A)	6 ft 2 in (188 cm)	188 lb (85 kg)	February 5, 1999 (aged 23)	(United States) Minnesota Duluth Bulldogs
29	G	Drew Commesso	6 ft 2 in (188 cm)	181 lb (82 kg)	July 19, 2002 (aged 19)	(United States) Boston University Terriers
31	G	Strauss Mann	6 ft 0 in (183 cm)	174 lb (79 kg)	August 18, 1998 (aged 23)	(Sweden) Skellefteå AIK
35	G	Pat Nagle	6 ft 3 in (191 cm)	185 lb (84 kg)	September 21, 1987 (aged 34)	(United States) Lehigh Valley Phantoms
37	F	Nick Shore	6 ft 1 in (185 cm)	195 lb (88 kg)	September 26, 1992 (aged 29)	(Russia) HC Sibir Novosibirsk
39	F	Ben Meyers	5 ft 11 in (180 cm)	194 lb (88 kg)	November 15, 1998 (aged 23)	(United States) Minnesota Golden Gophers
42	D	Aaron Ness	5 ft 10 in (178 cm)	170 lb (77 kg)	May 18, 1990 (aged 31)	(United States) Providence Bruins
51	F	Andy Miele (C)	5 ft 7 in (170 cm)	169 lb (77 kg)	April 15, 1988 (aged 33)	(Russia) Torpedo Nizhny Novgorod
67	F	Matthew Knies	6 ft 3 in (191 cm)	212 lb (96 kg)	October 17, 2002 (aged 19)	(United States) Minnesota Golden Gophers
89	F	Justin Abdelkader	6 ft 2 in (188 cm)	212 lb (96 kg)	January 25, 1987 (aged 35)	(United States) Grand Rapids Griffins

== Men's World Championships ==
=== 1998 IIHF World Championship ===
(finished 12th)

Position	Name	Height (cm)	Weight (kg)	Birthdate	Birthplace	1997–1998 team
G	Garth Snow	191	91	July 28, 1969	Wrentham, Massachusetts	Vancouver Canucks
G	Tim Thomas	180	91	April 15, 1974	Davison, Michigan	HIFK (SM-liiga)
D	Greg Brown	183	92	March 7, 1968	Southborough, Massachusetts	EV Landshut (ESBG)
D	Adam Burt	185	94	January 15, 1969	Detroit, Michigan	Carolina Hurricanes
D	Mike Crowley	180	86	July 4, 1975	Bloomington, Minnesota	Cincinnati Mighty Ducks (AHL)
D	Chris Luongo	193	88	March 17, 1967	Farmington Hills, Michigan	EV Landshut (ESBG)
D	Brian Rafalski	178	87	September 28, 1973	Dearborn, Michigan	HIFK (SM-liiga)
D	Paul Stanton	183	88	June 22, 1967	Boston, Massachusetts	Adler Mannheim (DEL)
D	Dan Trebil	191	98	April 10, 1974	Bloomington, Minnesota	Cincinnati Mighty Ducks (AHL)
D	Eric Weinrich	185	95	December 19, 1966	Roanoke, Virginia	Chicago Blackhawks
LW	Bates Battaglia	188	93	December 13, 1975	Chicago, Illinois	Carolina Hurricanes
LW	Donald Brashear	191	108	January 7, 1972	Bedford, Indiana	Vancouver Canucks
LW	Tom Chorske	185	96	September 18, 1966	Minneapolis, Minnesota	New York Islanders
LW	David Roberts	183	84	May 28, 1970	Alameda, California	Syracuse Crunch (AHL)
C	Matt Cullen	185	91	November 2, 1976	Virginia, Minnesota	Mighty Ducks of Anaheim
C	Chris Drury	179	86	August 20, 1976	Trumbull, Connecticut	Boston University (HE)
C	Ted Drury	183	86	September 13, 1971	Boston, Massachusetts	Mighty Ducks of Anaheim
C	Todd Harkins	191	95	October 8, 1968	Cleveland, Ohio	DEG Metro Stars (DEL)
C	Darby Hendrickson	183	88	August 28, 1972	Richfield, Minnesota	Toronto Maple Leafs
C	Bryan Smolinski	185	93	December 27, 1971	Toledo, Ohio	New York Islanders
RW	Kevin Miller	183	86	September 2, 1965	Lansing, Michigan	Chicago Blackhawks
RW	Mark Parrish	183	91	February 2, 1977	Bloomington, Minnesota	Seattle Thunderbirds (WHL)

=== 1999 IIHF World Championship ===
(finished 6th)

Position	Jersey #	Name	Height (cm)	Weight (kg)	Birthdate	Birthplace	1998–1999 team
G	1	Parris Duffus	188	87	January 27, 1970	Denver, Colorado	Jokerit (SM-liiga)
G	–	Chris Rogles	183	80	January 22, 1969	St. Louis, Missouri	Kassel Huskies (DEL)
G	30	Tim Thomas	180	91	April 15, 1974	Davison, Michigan	HIFK (SM-liiga)
D	4	Bret Hedican	188	95	August 10, 1970	St. Paul, Minnesota	Florida Panthers
D	6	Dan Keczmer	185	82	May 25, 1968	Mt. Clemens, Michigan	Nashville Predators
D	7	Scott Lachance	185	98	October 22, 1972	Charlottesville, Virginia	Montreal Canadiens
D	5	Barry Richter	188	92	September 11, 1970	Madison, Wisconsin	New York Islanders
D	3	Chris Tamer	188	96	November 17, 1970	Dearborn, Michigan	New York Rangers
D	22	Eric Weinrich	185	95	December 19, 1966	Roanoke, Virginia	Montreal Canadiens
LW	9	Tom Bissett	188	87	March 13, 1966	Seattle, Washington	Brynäs IF Gävle (SEL)
LW	17	Tom Chorske	185	96	September 18, 1966	Minneapolis, Minnesota	Calgary Flames
LW	19	Ted Donato	178	82	April 28, 1969	Boston, Massachusetts	Ottawa Senators
LW	23	Craig Johnson	191	90	March 8, 1972	St. Paul, Minnesota	Los Angeles Kings
LW	10	Kelly Miller	178	84	March 3, 1963	Detroit, Michigan	Washington Capitals
C	11	Matt Cullen	185	91	November 2, 1976	Virginia, Minnesota	Mighty Ducks of Anaheim
C	14	Darby Hendrickson	183	88	August 28, 1972	Richfield, Minnesota	Vancouver Canucks
C	18	David Legwand	188	86	August 17, 1980	Detroit, Michigan	Nashville Predators
C	20	Bryan Smolinski	185	93	December 27, 1971	Toledo, Ohio	New York Islanders
RW	12	David Emma	178	84	January 14, 1969	Cranston, Rhode Island	Klagenfurt AC (EBEL)
RW	21	Trent Klatt	185	93	January 30, 1971	Robbinsdale, Minnesota	Vancouver Canucks
RW	8	Mike Knuble	191	107	July 4, 1972	Toronto, Ontario, Canada	New York Rangers

=== 2000 IIHF World Championship ===
(finished 5th)

Position	Name	Height (cm)	Weight (kg)	Birthdate	Birthplace	1999–2000 team
G	Robert Esche	184	85	22 January 1978	(New York (state)) Utica, New York	(United States) Springfield Falcons
G	Karl Goehring	171	68	23 August 1978	Apple Valley, Minnesota	(United States) University of North Dakota
G	Damian Rhodes	184	82	28 May 1969	Saint Paul, Minnesota	(United States) Atlanta Thrashers
D	Ben Clymer	187	88	11 April 1978	Bloomington, Minnesota	(United States) Tampa Bay Lightning
D	Hal Gill	202	109	6 April 1975	Concord, Massachusetts	(United States) Boston Bruins
D	Phil Housley	179	84	9 March 1964	Saint Paul, Minnesota	(Canada) Calgary Flames
D	Chris Luongo	179	93	17 March 1967	Farmington Hills, Michigan	(Germany) Munich Barons
D	Mike Mottau	164	90	19 March 1978	Quincy, Massachusetts	(United States) Boston College
D	Chris O'Sullivan	189	93	15 May 1974	Dorchester, Massachusetts	(United States) Syracuse Crunch
D	Eric Weinrich	187	87	19 December 1966	Roanoke, Virginia	(Canada) Montreal Canadiens
LW	Jason Blake	179	82	2 September 1973	Moorhead, Minnesota	(United States) Los Angeles Kings
LW	Sean Haggerty	187	85	11 February 1976	(New York (state)) Rye, New York	(United States) Kansas City Blades
LW	Darby Hendrickson	187	88	28 August 1972	Richfield, Minnesota	(Canada) Vancouver Canucks
LW	Steve Konowalchuk	189	94	11 November 1972	Salt Lake City, Utah	(United States) Washington Capitals
LW	Mike Peluso	187	88	2 September 1974	Bismarck, North Dakota	(United States) Portland Pirates
C	Eric Boguniecki	174	87	6 May 1975	New Haven, Connecticut	(United States) Louisville Panthers
C	Jeff Halpern	184	88	3 May 1976	Potomac, Maryland	(United States) Washington Capitals
C	David Legwand	189	84	17 August 1980	Detroit, Michigan	(United States) Nashville Predators
C	Derek Plante	182	83	17 January 1971	Cloquet, Minnesota	(United States) Chicago Blackhawks
RW	Brian Gionta	171	75	18 January 1979	(New York (state)) Rochester, New York	(United States) Boston College
RW	Steve Heinze	182	92	30 January 1970	Lawrence, Massachusetts	(United States) Boston Bruins
RW	Jeff Nielsen	184	88	20 September 1971	Grand Rapids, Michigan	(United States) Mighty Ducks of Anaheim
RW	Chris Tancill	179	84	7 February 1968	Livonia, Michigan	(Switzerland) EV Zug

=== 2001 IIHF World Championship ===
(finished 4th)

Position	Name	Height (cm)	Weight (kg)	Birthdate	Birthplace	2000–2001 team
G	Rick DiPietro	185	95	September 19, 1981	Winthrop, Massachusetts	New York Islanders
G	Robert Esche	188	102	January 22, 1978	Whitesboro, New York	Phoenix Coyotes
G	Ryan Miller	188	75	July 17, 1980	East Lansing, Michigan	Michigan State University(CCHA)
D	Mark Eaton	188	96	May 6, 1977	Wilmington, Delaware	Philadelphia Flyers
D	Hal Gill	201	113	April 6, 1975	Concord, Massachusetts	Boston Bruins
D	Bret Hedican	188	95	August 10, 1970	St. Paul, Minnesota	Florida Panthers
D	Phil Housley	178	84	March 9, 1964	St. Paul, Minnesota	Calgary Flames
D	Deron Quint	188	99	March 12, 1976	Durham, New Hampshire	Columbus Blue Jackets
D	David Tanabe	185	96	July 19, 1980	White Bear Lake, Minnesota	Carolina Hurricanes
D	Eric Weinrich	185	95	December 19, 1966	Roanoke, Virginia	Boston Bruins
LW	Ryan Kraft	170	88	November 7, 1975	Bottineau, North Dakota	Kentucky Thoroughblades (AHL)
C	Tim Connolly	185	86	May 7, 1981	Baldwinsville, New York	New York Islanders
C	Craig Darby	185	88	September 26, 1972	Oneida, New York	Montreal Canadiens
C	Jeff Halpern	183	90	May 3, 1976	Potomac, Maryland	Washington Capitals
C	Darby Hendrickson	183	88	August 28, 1972	Richfield, Minnesota	Minnesota Wild
C	David Legwand	188	86	August 17, 1980	Detroit, Michigan	Nashville Predators
C	Derek Plante	180	82	January 17, 1971	Cloquet, Minnesota	Philadelphia Phantoms (AHL)
RW	Jim Campbell	188	93	February 3, 1973	Worcester, Massachusetts	Montreal Canadiens
RW	Brian Gionta	170	78	January 18, 1979	Rochester, New York	Boston College (Hockey East)
RW	Mike Knuble	191	107	July 4, 1972	Toronto, Ontario, Canada	Boston Bruins
RW	Mark Parrish	193	91	February 2, 1977	Bloomington, Minnesota	New York Islanders
RW	Landon Wilson	191	103	March 13, 1975	St. Louis, Missouri	Phoenix Coyotes

=== 2002 IIHF World Championship ===
(finished 7th)

Position	Jersey #	Name	Height (cm)	Weight (kg)	Birthdate	Birthplace	2001–2002 team
G	34	Dieter Kochan	185	84	May 11, 1974	Saskatoon, Saskatchewan, Canada	Springfield Falcons (AHL)
G	39	Ryan Miller	188	75	July 17, 1980	East Lansing, Michigan	Michigan State University(CCHA)
G	29	Gregg Naumenko	188	91	March 30, 1977	Chicago, Illinois	Dayton Bombers (ECHL)
D	8	Josh De Wolf	188	92	July 25, 1977	Bloomington, Minnesota	Cincinnati Mighty Ducks (AHL)
D	4	Mark Eaton	188	96	May 6, 1977	Wilmington, Delaware	Nashville Predators
D	2	Derian Hatcher	196	107	June 4, 1972	Sterling Heights, Michigan	Dallas Stars
D	3	Jordan Leopold	185	91	August 3, 1980	Golden Valley, Minnesota	University of Minnesota(WCHA)
D	27	Chris O'Sullivan	188	91	May 15, 1974	Dorchester, Massachusetts	Kloten Flyers (Swiss-A)
D	7	Todd Rohloff	190	96	January 16, 1974	Grand Rapids, Minnesota	Portland Pirates (AHL)
D	24	Chris Tamer	188	96	November 17, 1970	Dearborn, Michigan	Atlanta Thrashers
LW	21	Ted Donato	178	82	April 28, 1969	Boston, Massachusetts	Manchester Monarchs (AHL)
LW	22	Steve Konowalchuk	185	88	November 11, 1972	Salt Lake City, Utah	Washington Capitals
LW	33	Dan LaCouture	188	94	April 18, 1977	Hyannis, Massachusetts	Pittsburgh Penguins
LW	37	Erik Rasmussen	185	95	March 28, 1977	St. Louis Park, Minnesota	Buffalo Sabres
C	19	Andy Hilbert	180	88	February 6, 1981	Howell, Michigan	Providence Bruins(AHL)
C	62	Derek Plante	180	82	January 17, 1971	Cloquet, Minnesota	Munich Barons (DEL)
C	11	Marty Reasoner	185	91	February 26, 1977	Honeoye Falls, New York	Edmonton Oilers
RW	17	Chris Clark	183	91	March 8, 1976	South Windsor, Connecticut	Calgary Flames
RW	16	Mark Mowers	180	83	February 16, 1974	Decatur, Georgia	Milwaukee Admirals (AHL)
RW	10	Mark Murphy	180	91	August 6, 1976	Duxbury, Massachusetts	Portland Pirates (AHL)
RW	18	Richard Park	183	86	May 27, 1976	Seoul, South Korea	Minnesota Wild
RW	14	Joe Sacco	185	88	February 4, 1969	Medford, Massachusetts	Washington Capitals

=== 2003 IIHF World Championship ===
(finished 13th)

Position	Jersey #	Name	Height (cm)	Weight (kg)	Birthdate	Birthplace	2002–2003 team
G	30	Ryan Miller	188	75	July 17, 1980	East Lansing, Michigan	Rochester Americans (AHL)
G	35	Damian Rhodes	183	91	May 28, 1969	St. Paul, Minnesota	Greenville Grrrowl (ECHL)
G	31	Chris Rogles	183	80	January 22, 1969	St. Louis, Missouri	Kölner Haie (DEL)
D	51	Francis Bouillon	173	91	October 17, 1975	New York	Hamilton Bulldogs (AHL)
D	5	Joe Corvo	185	93	June 20, 1977	Oak Park, Illinois	Los Angeles Kings
D	20	Jim Fahey	183	93	May 11, 1979	Boston, Massachusetts	San Jose Sharks
D	22	John Gruden	183	91	June 4, 1970	Virginia, Minnesota	Eisbären Berlin (DEL)
D	2	Brett Hauer	188	93	July 11, 1971	Richfield, Minnesota	Servette Geneve(Swiss-A)
D	6	Phil Housley	178	84	March 9, 1964	St. Paul, Minnesota	Toronto Maple Leafs
D	4	Jordan Leopold	185	91	August 3, 1980	Golden Valley, Minnesota	Calgary Flames
D	3	Mike Mottau	183	88	March 19, 1978	Quincy, Massachusetts	Saint John Flames (AHL)
LW	39	Brad DeFauw	191	95	November 10, 1977	Edina, Minnesota	Lowell Lock Monsters(AHL)
LW	23	Craig Johnson	191	90	March 8, 1972	St. Paul, Minnesota	Los Angeles Kings
C	7	Matt Cullen	185	91	November 2, 1976	Virginia, Minnesota	Florida Panthers
C	15	Ted Drury	183	86	September 13, 1971	Boston, Massachusetts	Hamburg Freezers (DEL)
C	21	Kelly Fairchild	180	88	April 9, 1973	Hibbing, Minnesota	Eisbären Berlin (DEL)
C	13	Chris Ferraro	180	88	January 24, 1973	Port Jefferson, New York	Portland Pirates (AHL)
C	9	John Pohl	185	89	June 29, 1979	Rochester, Minnesota	Worcester IceCats (AHL)
C	19	Marty Reasoner	185	91	February 26, 1977	Honeoye Falls, New York	Edmonton Oilers
RW	16	Niko Dimitrakos	178	95	May 21, 1979	Somerville, Massachusetts	Cleveland Barons (AHL)
RW	17	Peter Ferraro	178	88	January 24, 1973	Port Jefferson, New York	Portland Pirates (AHL)
RW	18	Adam Hall	191	94	August 14, 1980	Kalamazoo, Michigan	Nashville Predators
RW	8	Kevin Miller	178	82	September 2, 1965	Lansing, Michigan	HC Davos (Swiss-A)

=== 2004 IIHF World Championship ===
(won bronze medal)

Position	Jersey #	Name	Height (cm)	Weight (kg)	Birthdate	Birthplace	2003–2004 team
G	29	Ty Conklin	183	83	March 30, 1976	Phoenix, Arizona	Edmonton Oilers
G	1	Mike Dunham	188	86	June 1, 1972	Johnson City, New York	New York Rangers
G	32	Alex Westlund	175	84	December 28, 1975	Flemington Village, New Jersey	Khabarovsk Amur (KHL)
D	31	Keith Ballard	180	91	November 26, 1982	Baudette, Minnesota	University of Minnesota (WCHA)
D	26	Hal Gill	201	113	April 6, 1975	Concord, Massachusetts	Boston Bruins
D	2	Brett Hauer	188	93	July 11, 1971	Richfield, Minnesota	Servette Geneve(Swiss-A)
D	34	Jeff Jillson ^{†}	191	102	July 24, 1980	North Smithfield, Rhode Island	Buffalo Sabres
D	27	Paul Mara	193	99	September 7, 1979	Belmont, Massachusetts	Phoenix Coyotes
D	3	Aaron Miller ^{†}	190	91	August 11, 1971	Buffalo, New York	Los Angeles Kings
D	6	Andy Roach	180	82	August 22, 1973	Mattawan, Michigan	Adler Mannheim (DEL)
D	33	Blake Sloan	178	91	July 27, 1975	Park Ridge, Illinois	Dallas Stars
LW	13	Bates Battaglia	188	93	December 13, 1975	Chicago, Illinois	Washington Capitals
LW	12	Ryan Malone	193	102	December 1, 1979	Pittsburgh, Pennsylvania	Pittsburgh Penguins
C	17	Matt Cullen	185	91	November 2, 1976	Virginia, Minnesota	Florida Panthers
C	23	Chris Drury	179	86	August 20, 1976	Trumbull, Connecticut	Buffalo Sabres
C	11	Jeff Halpern	184	91	May 3, 1976	Potomac, Maryland	Washington Capitals
C	16	Andy Hilbert	180	88	February 6, 1981	Howell, Michigan	Boston Bruins
C	7	Erik Westrum	183	93	July 26, 1979	Minneapolis, Minnesota	Springfield Falcons (AHL)
RW	9	Dustin Brown	187	82	November 4, 1984	Ithaca, New York	Los Angeles Kings
RW	25	Mike Grier	185	103	January 5, 1975	Detroit, Michigan	Buffalo Sabres
RW	28	Adam Hall	191	94	August 14, 1980	Kalamazoo, Michigan	Nashville Predators
RW	18	Richard Park	183	86	May 27, 1976	Seoul, South Korea	Minnesota Wild

^{†} Listed at Forward

=== 2005 IIHF World Championship ===
(finished 6th)

- The NHL season was canceled due to the 2004–05 NHL lockout listed below are the teams players were playing for (if any) during the labor dispute and the franchises they returned to.

Position	Jersey #	Name	Height (cm)	Weight (kg)	Birthdate	Birthplace	2004–2005 team	2005–2006 team
G	30	Ty Conklin	183	83	March 30, 1976	Phoenix, Arizona	Grizzly Adams Wolfsburg (DEL)	Edmonton Oilers
G	29	Rick DiPietro	180	84	September 19, 1981	Winthrop, Massachusetts	None	New York Islanders
G	73	Tim Thomas	180	191	April 15, 1974	Davison, Michigan	Jokerit (SM-liiga)	Boston Bruins
D	25	Hal Gill	202	109	April 6, 1975	Concord, Massachusetts	Lukko Rauma (SM-liiga)	Boston Bruins
D	4	Jordan Leopold	185	91	August 3, 1980	Golden Valley, Minnesota	None	Calgary Flames
D	8	John-Michael Liles	179	84	November 25, 1980	Zionsville, Indiana	Iserlohn Roosters (DEL)	Colorado Avalanche
D	10	Paul Martin	187	77	March 5, 1981	Minneapolis, Minnesota	HC Fribourg-Gottéron (Swiss-A)	New Jersey Devils
D	3	Aaron Miller	193	95.5	August 11, 1971	Buffalo, New York	None	Los Angeles Kings
D	6	Andy Roach	180	82	August 22, 1973	Mattawan, Michigan	Lausanne Hockey Club(Swiss-A)	St. Louis Blues
LW	21	Erik Cole	188	91	November 6, 1978	Oswego, New York	Eisbären Berlin(DEL)	Carolina Hurricanes
LW	22	Yan Stastny	178	87	September 30, 1982	Quebec City, Quebec, Canada	Nürnberg Ice Tigers (DEL)	Iowa Stars (AHL)
LW	16	Mike York	178	84	January 3, 1978	Waterford, Michigan	Iserlohn Roosters(DEL)	New York Islanders
LW	11	Jeff Halpern	183	90	May 3, 1976	Potomac, Maryland	HC Ajoie (Swiss-B)	Washington Capitals
C	17	Matt Cullen	185	91	November 2, 1976	Virginia, Minnesota	SG Cortina (LIHG)	Carolina Hurricanes
C	19	David Legwand	188	86	August 17, 1980	Detroit, Michigan	Basel (Swiss-B)	Nashville Predators
C	9	Mike Modano	191	95	June 7, 1970	Livonia, Michigan	None	Dallas Stars
C	39	Doug Weight	180	89	January 21, 1971	Warren, Michigan	Frankfurt Lions(DEL)	St. Louis Blues
RW	14	Brian Gionta	171	75	January 18, 1979	Rochester, New York	Albany River Rats(AHL)	New Jersey Devils
RW	26	Mike Knuble	191	107	July 4, 1972	Toronto, Ontario, Canada	Linköping HC (SEL)	Philadelphia Flyers
RW	18	Richard Park	183	86	May 27, 1976	Seoul, South Korea	SC Langnau (Swiss-A)	Vancouver Canucks
RW	37	Mark Parrish	183	91	February 2, 1977	Minneapolis, Minnesota	None	New York Islanders

=== 2006 IIHF World Championship ===
(finished 7th)

Position	Jersey #	Name	Height (cm)	Weight (kg)	Birthdate	Birthplace	2005–2006 team
G	31	Craig Anderson	188	79	May 21, 1981	Park Ridge, Illinois	Chicago Blackhawks
G	33	Jason Bacashihua	180	79	September 20, 1982	Dearborn Heights, Michigan	St. Louis Blues
G	30	David McKee	185	82	December 5, 1983	Midland, Texas	Cornell (ECAC)
D	41	Andrew Alberts	196	104	June 30, 1981	Eden Prairie, Minnesota	Boston Bruins
D	6	Joe Corvo	185	93	June 20, 1977	Oak Park, Illinois	Los Angeles Kings
D	25	Hal Gill	202	109	April 6, 1975	Concord, Massachusetts	Boston Bruins
D	55	Mike Komisarek	194	104	January 19, 1982	Islip Terrace, New York	Montreal Canadiens
D	34	Freddy Meyer	178	87	January 4, 1981	Sanbornville, New Hampshire	Philadelphia Flyers
D	44	Brooks Orpik	188	99	September 26, 1980	San Francisco, California	Pittsburgh Penguins
D	7	Ryan Suter	185	88	January 21, 1985	Madison, Wisconsin	Nashville Predators
LW	14	Mark Cullen	180	79	October 28, 1978	Moorhead, Minnesota	Chicago Blackhawks
LW	9	Andy Hilbert	180	88	February 6, 1981	Howell, Michigan	Pittsburgh Penguins
LW	12	Ryan Malone	193	102	December 1, 1979	Pittsburgh, Pennsylvania	Pittsburgh Penguins
LW	21	Yan Stastny	178	87	September 30, 1982	Quebec City, Quebec, Canada	Providence Bruins (AHL)
C	17	Ryan Kesler	188	92	August 31, 1984	Livonia, Michigan	Vancouver Canucks
C	10	Patrick O'Sullivan	180	86	February 1, 1985	Toronto, Ontario, Canada	Houston Aeros (AHL)
C	11	Marty Reasoner	185	91	February 26, 1977	Honeoye Falls, New York	Boston Bruins
C	16	Jim Slater	182	75	December 9, 1982	Detroit, Michigan	Atlanta Thrashers
C	20	R. J. Umberger	181	91	May 3, 1982	Pittsburgh, Pennsylvania	Philadelphia Flyers
RW	23	Dustin Brown	187	82	November 4, 1984	Ithaca, New York	Los Angeles Kings
RW	28	Adam Hall	191	94	August 14, 1980	Kalamazoo, Michigan	Nashville Predators
RW	8	Phil Kessel	180	82	October 2, 1987	Madison, Wisconsin	University of Minnesota (WCHA)
RW	18	Richard Park	183	86	May 27, 1976	Seoul, South Korea	Vancouver Canucks
RW	19	Drew Stafford	188	92	October 30, 1985	Milwaukee, Wisconsin	University of North Dakota (WCHA)

=== 2007 IIHF World Championship ===
(finished 5th)

Position	Jersey #	Name	Height (cm)	Weight (kg)	Birthdate	Birthplace	2006–2007 team
G	33	Jason Bacashihua	180	79	September 20, 1982	Dearborn Heights, Michigan	St. Louis Blues
G	47	John Grahame	191	100	August 31, 1975	Denver, Colorado	Carolina Hurricanes
G	1	Cory Schneider	188	91	March 18, 1986	Marblehead, Massachusetts	Boston College (HE)
D	41	Andrew Alberts	196	104	June 30, 1981	Eden Prairie, Minnesota	Boston Bruins
D	44	Keith Ballard	180	91	November 26, 1982	Baudette, Minnesota	Phoenix Coyotes
D	5	Matt Greene	191	101	May 13, 1983	Grand Ledge, Michigan	Edmonton Oilers
D	24	Andrew Hutchinson	188	93	March 24, 1980	Evanston, Illinois	Carolina Hurricanes
D	6	Erik Johnson	193	107	March 21, 1988	Bloomington, Minnesota	University of Minnesota (WCHA)
D	3	Jack Johnson	185	102	January 13, 1987	Indianapolis, Indiana	Los Angeles Kings
D	2	Brian Pothier	183	88	April 15, 1977	New Bedford, Massachusetts	Washington Capitals
D	7	Ryan Suter	185	88	January 21, 1985	Madison, Wisconsin	Nashville Predators
LW	26	Erik Cole	188	91	November 6, 1978	Oswego, New York	Carolina Hurricanes
LW	16	Nathan Davis	185	87	May 23, 1986	Rocky River, Ohio	Miami University (Ohio) (CCHA)
LW	59	Chad LaRose	179	77	March 27, 1982	Fraser, Michigan	Carolina Hurricanes
LW	20	Toby Petersen	178	89	October 27, 1978	Minneapolis, Minnesota	Edmonton Oilers
C	39	Tyler Arnason	180	93	March 16, 1979	Oklahoma City, Oklahoma	Colorado Avalanche
C	11	Paul Stastny	183	93	December 27, 1985	Quebec City, Quebec, Canada	Colorado Avalanche
C	12	Lee Stempniak	183	88	February 4, 1983	West Seneca, New York	St. Louis Blues
RW	18	David Backes	188	98	May 1, 1984	Minneapolis	St. Louis Blues
RW	10	Brandon Bochenski	185	90	April 4, 1982	Blaine, Minnesota	Boston Bruins
RW	17	Chris Clark	183	91	March 8, 1976	South Windsor, Connecticut	Washington Capitals
RW	28	Adam Hall	191	94	August 14, 1980	Kalamazoo, Michigan	Minnesota Wild
RW	8	Phil Kessel	183	86	October 2, 1987	Madison, Wisconsin	Boston Bruins

=== 2008 IIHF World Championship ===
(finished 6th)

Position	Jersey #	Name	Height (cm)	Weight (kg)	Birthdate	Birthplace	2007–2008 team
G	31	Craig Anderson	188	79	May 21, 1981	Park Ridge, Illinois	Florida Panthers
G	35	Robert Esche	188	102	January 22, 1978	Whitesboro, New York	Ak Bars Kazan (KHL)
G	30	Tim Thomas	180	91	April 15, 1974	Davison, Michigan	Boston Bruins
D	2	Keith Ballard	180	91	November 26, 1982	Baudette, Minnesota	Phoenix Coyotes
D	77	Tom Gilbert	191	95	January 10, 1983	Bloomington, Minnesota	Edmonton Oilers
D	6	Tim Gleason	183	98	January 29, 1983	Clawson, Michigan	Carolina Hurricanes
D	5	Matt Greene	191	101	May 13, 1983	Grand Ledge, Michigan	Edmonton Oilers
D	4	Jordan Leopold	185	91	August 3, 1980	Golden Valley, Minnesota	Colorado Avalanche
D	10	Paul Martin	187	77	March 5, 1981	Minneapolis, Minnesota	New Jersey Devils
D	22	Mark Stuart	188	97	April 27, 1984	Rochester, Minnesota	Boston Bruins
D	43	James Wisniewski	180	88	February 21, 1984	Canton, Michigan	Chicago Blackhawks
LW	7	David Booth	183	96	November 24, 1984	Detroit, Michigan	Florida Panthers
LW	83	Patrick Kane	178	81	November 19, 1988	Buffalo, New York	Chicago Blackhawks
LW	9	Patrick O'Sullivan	180	86	February 1, 1985	Toronto, Ontario, Canada	L.A. Kings
LW	17	Zach Parise	180	86	July 28, 1984	Prior Lake, Minnesota	New Jersey Devils
C	16	Brandon Dubinsky	185	95	April 29, 1986	Anchorage, Alaska	New York Rangers
C	11	Jeff Halpern	183	90	May 3, 1976	Potomac, Maryland	Tampa Bay Lightning
C	88	Peter Mueller	188	93	April 14, 1988	Bloomington, Minnesota	Phoenix Coyotes
C	12	Lee Stempniak	183	88	February 4, 1983	West Seneca, New York	St. Louis Blues
RW	42	David Backes	188	98	May 1, 1984	Minneapolis	St. Louis Blues
RW	23	Dustin Brown	187	82	November 4, 1984	Ithaca, New York	L.A. Kings
RW	37	Adam Burish	185	91	January 6, 1983	Madison, Wisconsin	Chicago Blackhawks
RW	8	Phil Kessel	183	86	October 2, 1987	Madison, Wisconsin	Boston Bruins
RW	29	Jason Pominville	183	84	November 30, 1982	Repentigny, Quebec, Canada	Buffalo Sabres
RW	19	Drew Stafford	188	92	October 30, 1985	Milwaukee, Wisconsin	Buffalo Sabres

=== 2009 IIHF World Championship ===
(finished 4th)

Position	Jersey #	Name	Height (cm)	Weight (kg)	Birthdate	Birthplace	2008–2009 team
G	30	Scott Clemmensen	191	98	July 23, 1977	Des Moines, Iowa	New Jersey Devils
G	31	Robert Esche	188	102	January 22, 1978	Whitesboro, New York	SKA St. Petersburg (KHL)
G	35	Al Montoya	188	88	February 13, 1985	Glenview, Illinois	Phoenix Coyotes
D	2	Keith Ballard	180	91	November 26, 1982	Baudette, Minnesota	Florida Panthers
D	4	Zach Bogosian	191	93	July 15, 1990	Massena, New York	Atlanta Thrashers
D	6	Ron Hainsey	191	95	March 24, 1981	Bolton, Connecticut	Atlanta Thrashers
D	7	Peter Harrold	180	88	June 8, 1983	Kirtland Hills, Ohio	Los Angeles Kings
D	3	Jack Johnson	185	102	January 13, 1987	Indianapolis, Indiana	Los Angeles Kings
D	15	John-Michael Liles	179	84	November 25, 1980	Zionsville, Indiana	Colorado Avalanche
D	5	Matt Niskanen	185	86	December 6, 1986	Virginia, Minnesota	Dallas Stars
D	20	Ryan Suter	185	88	January 21, 1985	Madison, Wisconsin	Nashville Predators
LW	55	Jason Blake	178	82	September 2, 1973	Moorhead, Minnesota	Toronto Maple Leafs
LW	17	Nick Foligno	183	91	October 31, 1987	Buffalo, New York	Ottawa Senators
LW	18	Chris Higgins	183	92	June 2, 1983	Smithtown, New York	Montreal Canadiens
LW	49	Colin Stuart	188	93	July 8, 1982	Rochester, Minnesota	Atlanta Thrashers
LW	33	Colin Wilson	185	98	October 20, 1989	Greenwich, Connecticut	Boston University (HE)
C	74	T. J. Oshie	180	79	December 23, 1986	Mount Vernon, Washington	St. Louis Blues
C	12	Patrick O'Sullivan	180	86	February 1, 1985	Toronto, Ontario, Canada	Edmonton Oilers
C	8	Joe Pavelski	180	88	July 11, 1984	Plover, Wisconsin	San Jose Sharks
C	22	Lee Stempniak	183	88	February 4, 1983	West Seneca, New York	Toronto Maple Leafs
RW	42	David Backes	188	98	May 1, 1984	Minneapolis, Minnesota	St. Louis Blues
RW	23	Dustin Brown	187	82	November 4, 1984	Ithaca, New York	Los Angeles Kings
RW	9	Kyle Okposo	185	91	April 16, 1988	St. Paul, Minnesota	New York Islanders
RW	26	Ryan Shannon	175	78	March 2, 1983	Darien, Connecticut	Ottawa Senators
RW	21	Drew Stafford	188	92	October 30, 1985	Milwaukee, Wisconsin	Buffalo Sabres

=== 2010 IIHF World Championship ===
- Finished 13th

Position	Jersey #	Name	Height (cm)	Weight (kg)	Birthdate	Birthplace	2009–2010 team
G	1	Ben Bishop	201	93	November 21, 1986	Denver, Colorado	Peoria Rivermen
G	30	Scott Clemmensen	191	93	July 23, 1977	Des Moines, Iowa	Florida Panthers
G	33	David Leggio	180	81	July 31, 1984	Williamsville, New York	TPS Turku
D	41	Taylor Chorney	180	83	April 27, 1987	Thunder Bay, Ontario, Canada	Edmonton Oilers
D	97	Matt Gilroy	185	91	July 20, 1984	North Bellmore, New York	New York Rangers
D	6	Andy Greene	180	82	October 30, 1982	Trenton, Michigan	New Jersey Devils
D	2	Matt Greene	191	108	May 13, 1983	Grand Ledge, Michigan	Los Angeles Kings
D	38	Jack Hillen	180	91	January 24, 1986	Portland, Oregon	New York Islanders
D	3	Jack Johnson	185	102	January 13, 1987	Indianapolis, Indiana	Los Angeles Kings
D	39	Mike Lundin	188	89	September 24, 1984	Apple Valley, Minnesota	Tampa Bay Lightning
D	93	Keith Yandle	188	88	September 9, 1986	Boston, Massachusetts	Phoenix Coyotes
F	22	Ryan Carter	188	91	August 3, 1983	White Bear Lake, Minnesota	Anaheim Ducks
F	17	Brandon Dubinsky	185	93	April 29, 1986	Anchorage, Alaska	New York Rangers
F	71	Nick Foligno	183	95	October 31, 1987	Buffalo, New York	Ottawa Senators
F	18	T.J. Galiardi	188	88	April 22, 1988	Calgary, Alberta, Canada	Colorado Avalanche
F	20	Christian Hanson	191	92	March 10, 1986	Glens Falls, New York	Toronto Maple Leafs
F	13	Tim Kennedy	178	80	April 30, 1986	Buffalo, New York	Buffalo Sabres
F	19	Chris Kreider	188	91	April 30, 1991	Boxford, Massachusetts	Boston College
F	25	David Moss	191	91	December 28, 1981	Livonia, Michigan	Calgary Flames
F	23	Eric Nystrom	185	88	February 14, 1983	Syosset, New York	Calgary Flames
F	21	Kyle Okposo	185	91	April 16, 1988	St. Paul, Minnesota	New York Islanders
F	16	Ryan Potulny	183	86	September 5, 1984	Grand Forks, North Dakota	Edmonton Oilers

=== 2011 IIHF World Championship ===
- Finished 8th

Position	Jersey #	Name	Height (in)	Weight (lb)	Birthdate	Birthplace	2010–2011 team
G	1	Jack Campbell	182	6'2"	January 1, 1992	Port Huron, Michigan	Windsor Spitfires
G	29	Ty Conklin	192	6'1"	March 30, 1976	Anchorage, Alaska	St. Louis Blues
G	35	Al Montoya	195	6'2"	February 13, 1985	Glenview, Illinois	New York Islanders
D	34	Mark Fayne	215	6'3"	May 5, 1987	Nashua, New Hampshire	New Jersey Devils
D	7	Cam Fowler	196	6'1"	December 5, 1991	Farmington Hills, Michigan	Anaheim Ducks
D	27	Jake Gardiner	205	6'1"	July 4, 1990	Minnetonka, Minnesota	Toronto Marlies
D	3	Jack Johnson	219	6'1"	January 1, 1987	Ann Arbor, Michigan	Los Angeles Kings
D	8	Mike Komisarek	193	6'4"	January 19, 1982	Islip Terrace, New York	Toronto Maple Leafs
D	2	Ryan McDonagh	213	6'1"	June 13, 1989	St. Paul, Minnesota	New York Rangers
D	3	Kevin Shattenkirk	193	5'11"	January 29, 1989	New Rochelle, New York	St. Louis Blues
D	5	Mark Stuart	213	6'2"	April 27, 1984	Rochester, Minnesota	Atlanta Thrashers
D	4	Clay Wilson	195	6'0"	April 5, 1983	Sturgeon Lake, Minnesota	Florida Panthers
F	18	Mike Brown	195	5'11"	June 24, 1985	Northbrook, Illinois	Toronto Maple Leafs
F	28	Paul Gaustad	212	6'5"	February 3, 1982	Fargo, North Dakota	Buffalo Sabres
F	19	Chris Kreider	205	6'2"	April 30, 1991	Boxford, Massachusetts	Boston College
F	21	Andy Miele	180	5'9"	April 15, 1988	Grosse Pointe Woods, Michigan	Miami University
F	25	Nick Palmieri	220	6'3"	July 12, 1989	Utica, New York	New Jersey Devils
F	24	Chris Porter	220	6'1"	May 29, 1984	Faribault, Minnesota	St. Louis Blues
F	26	Ryan Shannon	175	5'9"	March 2, 1983	Darien, Connecticut	Ottawa Senators
F	20	Jack Skille	215	6'1"	May 19, 1987	Madison, Wisconsin	Florida Panthers
F	15	Craig Smith	196	6'0"	September 5, 1989	Madison, Wisconsin	University of Wisconsin
F	23	Tim Stapleton	180	5'9"	June 19, 1982	Forest Park, Illinois	Atlanta Thrashers
F	22	Yan Stastny	191	5'10"	September 30, 1982	St. Louis, Missouri	CSKA Moscow
F	9	Derek Stepan	182	6'0"	June 18, 1990	Hastings, Minnesota	New York Rangers
F	16	James van Riemsdyk	200	6'3"	May 4, 1989	Middletown, New Jersey	Philadelphia Flyers
F	17	Blake Wheeler	205	6'5"	August 31, 1986	Robbinsdale, Minnesota	Atlanta Thrashers

=== 2012 IIHF World Championship ===
- Finished 7th

Position	Jersey #	Name	Height (in)	Weight (lb)	Birthdate	Hometown	2011–2012 team
G	31	Richard Bachman	5'10"	174	July 25, 1987	Salt Lake City, Utah	Dallas Stars
G	35	Jimmy Howard	6'0"	216	March 26, 1984	Syracuse, New York	Detroit Red Wings
G	36	John Curry	5'11"	185	June 5, 1985	Shorewood, Minnesota	Hamburg Freezers
D	2	Jeff Petry	6'3"	196	December 9, 1987	Ann Arbor, Michigan	Edmonton Oilers
D	3	Jack Johnson (C)	6'1"	231	January 13, 1987	Ann Arbor, Michigan	Columbus Blue Jackets
D	4	Cam Fowler	6'1"	196	December 5, 1991	Farmington Hills, Michigan	Anaheim Ducks
D	7	Alex Goligoski	5'11"	181	July 30, 1985	Grand Rapids, Minnesota	Dallas Stars
D	20	Justin Braun	6'2"	201	February 10, 1987	Minneapolis, Minnesota	San Jose Sharks
D	27	Justin Faulk	6'0"	205	March 20, 1992	South St. Paul, Minnesota	Carolina Hurricanes
D	34	Chris Butler	6'1"	196	October 27, 1986	St. Louis, Missouri	Calgary Flames
F	9	Bobby Ryan	6'2"	209	March 17, 1987	Cherry Hill, New Jersey	Anaheim Ducks
F	11	Ryan Lasch	5'9"	176	January 22, 1987	Lake Forest, California	Lahti Pelicans
F	13	Cam Atkinson	5'7"	172	June 5, 1989	Riverside, Connecticut	Columbus Blue Jackets
F	15	Joey Crabb	6'1"	190	April 3, 1983	Anchorage, Alaska	Toronto Maple Leafs
F	18	Justin Abdelkader	6'1"	216	February 25, 1987	Muskegon, Michigan	Detroit Red Wings
F	19	Jim Slater (A)	6'0"	201	December 9, 1982	Lapeer, Michigan	Winnipeg Jets
F	21	Kyle Okposo	6'0"	205	April 16, 1988	Saint Paul, Minnesota	New York Islanders
F	23	J. T. Brown	5'10"	170	July 2, 1990	Burnsville, Minnesota	Tampa Bay Lightning
F	25	Craig Smith	6'0"	196	September 5, 1989	Madison, Wisconsin	Nashville Predators
F	26	Paul Stastny	6'0"	205	December 27, 1985	St. Louis, Missouri	Colorado Avalanche
F	39	Patrick Dwyer	5'11"	174	June 22, 1983	Spokane, Washington	Carolina Hurricanes
F	44	Nate Thompson (A)	6'0"	209	October 5, 1984	Anchorage, Alaska	Tampa Bay Lightning
F	61	Kyle Palmieri	5'11"	194	February 1, 1991	Smithtown, New York	Anaheim Ducks
F	67	Max Pacioretty	6'2"	196	November 20, 1988	New Canaan, Connecticut	Montreal Canadiens

=== 2013 IIHF World Championship ===
- Won bronze medal

Position	Jersey #	Name	Height (in)	Weight (lb)	Birthdate	Hometown	2012–2013 team
G	30	Ben Bishop	6'7"	214	November 21, 1986	Denver, Colorado	Tampa Bay Lightning
G	35	John Gibson	6'3"	212	July 14, 1993	Pittsburgh, Pennsylvania	Kitchener Rangers
G	36	Cal Heeter	6'4"	194	November 2, 1988	St. Louis, Missouri	Adirondack Phantoms
D	2	Jeff Petry	6'3"	201	December 9, 1987	Ann Arbor, Michigan	Edmonton Oilers
D	4	Jamie McBain	6'2"	201	February 25, 1988	Edina, Minnesota	Carolina Hurricanes
D	6	Erik Johnson	6'4"	231	March 21, 1988	Bloomington, Minnesota	Colorado Avalanche
D	8	Jacob Trouba	6'2"	187	February 26, 1994	Rochester, Michigan	Winnipeg Jets
D	22	Matt Hunwick	5'11"	190	May 21, 1985	Warren, Michigan	Colorado Avalanche
D	25	Matt Carle (A)	6'0"	205	September 25, 1984	Anchorage, Alaska	Tampa Bay Lightning
D	27	Justin Faulk	6'0"	216	March 20, 1992	South St. Paul, Minnesota	Carolina Hurricanes
D	34	Chris Butler	6'1"	196	October 27, 1986	St. Louis, Missouri	Calgary Flames
F	7	Danny Kristo	5'11"	181	June 18, 1990	Eden Prairie, Minnesota	Hamilton Bulldogs
F	11	Stephen Gionta	5'7"	185	October 9, 1983	Rochester, New York	New Jersey Devils
F	12	Bobby Butler	6'0"	190	April 26, 1987	Marlborough, Massachusetts	Nashville Predators
F	14	Nick Bjugstad	6'6"	216	July 17, 1992	Minneapolis, Minnesota	Florida Panthers
F	15	Craig Smith	6'1"	203	September 5, 1989	Madison, Wisconsin	Nashville Predators
F	17	Aaron Palushaj	5'11"	187	September 7, 1989	Livonia, Michigan	Colorado Avalanche
F	18	David Moss	6'3"	201	December 28, 1981	Livonia, Michigan	Phoenix Coyotes
F	19	Tim Stapleton	5'9"	181	July 19, 1982	La Grange, Illinois	HC Dinamo Minsk
F	20	Ryan Carter	6'1"	205	September 3, 1983	White Bear Lake, Minnesota	New Jersey Devils
F	21	Drew LeBlanc	6'0"	185	June 29, 1989	Duluth, Minnesota	Chicago Blackhawks
F	26	Paul Stastny (C)	6'0"	205	December 27, 1985	St. Louis, Missouri	Colorado Avalanche
F	32	Alex Galchenyuk	6'0"	198	February 12, 1994	Milwaukee, Wisconsin	Montreal Canadiens
F	44	Nate Thompson (A)	6'0"	212	October 5, 1984	Anchorage, Alaska	Tampa Bay Lightning
F	74	T. J. Oshie	5'11"	170	December 23, 1986	Warroad, Minnesota	St. Louis Blues

=== 2014 IIHF World Championship ===
- Finished 6th

Position	Jersey #	Name	Height (in)	Weight (lb)	Birthdate	Hometown	2013–2014 team
G	30	Tim Thomas	5'11"	201	April 15, 1974	Flint, Michigan	Dallas Stars
G	33	David Leggio	6'0"	187	July 31, 1984	Williamsville, New York	Hershey Bears
G	37	Connor Hellebuyck	6'4"	200	May 19, 1993	Commerce, Michigan	University of Massachusetts Lowell
D	2	Jeff Petry	6'3"	195	December 9, 1987	Ann Arbor, Michigan	Edmonton Oilers
D	3	Seth Jones	6'4"	206	October 3, 1994	Plano, Texas	Nashville Predators
D	8	Jacob Trouba	6'1"	226	February 26, 1994	Rochester, Michigan	Winnipeg Jets
D	29	Jake McCabe	6'1"	210	October 12, 1993	Eau Claire, Wisconsin	Buffalo Sabres
D	46	Matt Donovan	6'0"	195	May 9, 1990	Edmond, Oklahoma	New York Islanders
D	51	Jake Gardiner	6'2"	184	July 4, 1990	Minnetonka, Minnesota	Toronto Maple Leafs
D	55	Connor Murphy	6'3"	190	March 23, 1993	Dublin, Ohio	Phoenix Coyotes
D	65	Danny DeKeyser	6'3"	198	March 7, 1990	Clay Township, Michigan	Detroit Red Wings
F	9	Tyler Johnson	5'9"	182	July 29, 1990	Spokane, Washington	Tampa Bay Lightning
F	10	Jimmy Hayes	6'6"	221	November 21, 1989	Dorchester, Massachusetts	Florida Panthers
F	11	Brock Nelson	6'3"	196	October 15, 1991	Warroad, Minnesota	New York Islanders
F	12	Kevin Hayes	6'4"	216	May 8, 1992	Dorchester, Massachusetts	Boston College
F	13	Colin McDonald (A)	6'2"	214	September 30, 1984	Wethersfield, Connecticut	New York Islanders
F	15	Craig Smith (A)	6'1"	202	September 5, 1989	Madison, Wisconsin	Nashville Predators
F	19	Tim Stapleton (A)	5'9"	180	July 9, 1982	La Grange, Illinois	Ak Bars Kazan
F	21	Vince Trocheck	5'10"	182	July 11, 1993	Pittsburgh, Pennsylvania	Florida Panthers
F	23	Drew Shore	6'3"	205	January 29, 1991	Denver, Colorado	Florida Panthers
F	53	Johnny Gaudreau	5'8"	159	August 13, 1993	Carneys Point, New Jersey	Calgary Flames
F	57	Tommy Wingels	6'0"	192	April 12, 1988	Evanston, Illinois	San Jose Sharks
F	79	Andy Miele	5'9"	175	April 15, 1988	Grosse Pointe Woods, Michigan	Phoenix Coyotes
F	88	Peter Mueller	6'2"	209	April 14, 1988	Bloomington, Minnesota	Kloten Flyers
F	89	Justin Abdelkader (C)	6'1"	219	February 25, 1987	Muskegon, Michigan	Detroit Red Wings

=== 2015 IIHF World Championship ===
- Won bronze medal

Position	Jersey #	Name	Height (in)	Weight (lb)	Birthdate	Hometown	2014–2015 team
G	1	Jack Campbell	6'3"	195	January 9, 1992	Port Huron, Michigan	Texas Stars
G	34	Alex Lyon	6'1"	200	December 9, 1992	Baudette, Minnesota	Yale University
G	37	Connor Hellebuyck	6'4"	185	May 19, 1993	Commerce, Michigan	St. John's IceCaps
D	3	Seth Jones	6'4"	205	October 3, 1994	Plano, Texas	Nashville Predators
D	5	Connor Murphy	6'4"	212	March 23, 1993	Dublin, Ohio	Arizona Coyotes
D	6	Mike Reilly	6'1"	182	July 13, 1993	Chanhassen, Minnesota	University of Minnesota
D	17	John Moore	6'3"	202	November 19, 1990	Winnetka, Illinois	Arizona Coyotes
D	24	Zach Redmond	6'2"	205	July 26, 1988	Traverse City, Michigan	Colorado Avalanche
D	27	Justin Faulk (A)	6'0"	215	March 20, 1992	South St. Paul, Minnesota	Carolina Hurricanes
D	47	Torey Krug	5'9"	181	April 12, 1991	Livonia, Michigan	Boston Bruins
D	51	Jake Gardiner	6'2"	184	July 4, 1990	Minnetonka, Minnesota	Toronto Maple Leafs
F	9	Jack Eichel	6'1"	191	October 28, 1996	North Chelmsford, Massachusetts	Boston University
F	12	Ben Smith	5'11"	205	July 11, 1988	Avon, Connecticut	San Jose Sharks
F	13	Nick Bonino	6'1"	196	April 20, 1988	Hartford, Connecticut	Pittsburgh Penguins
F	14	Steve Moses	5'9"	170	August 9, 1989	Leominster, Massachusetts	Jokerit
F	19	Jimmy Vesey	6'3"	203	May 26, 1993	North Reading, Massachusetts	Harvard University
F	21	Dylan Larkin	6'0"	172	July 30, 1996	Waterford, Michigan	University of Michigan
F	22	Trevor Lewis (A)	6'1"	198	January 8, 1987	Salt Lake City, Utah	Los Angeles Kings
F	23	Matt Hendricks (C)	6'0"	211	June 17, 1981	Blaine, Minnesota	Edmonton Oilers
F	26	Jeremy Morin	6'1"	192	April 16, 1991	Auburn, New York	Columbus Blue Jackets
F	29	Brock Nelson	6'3"	206	October 15, 1991	Warroad, Minnesota	New York Islanders
F	33	Charlie Coyle	6'3"	221	March 2, 1992	East Weymouth, Massachusetts	Minnesota Wild
F	36	Mark Arcobello	5'8"	172	August 12, 1988	Milford, Connecticut	Arizona Coyotes
F	42	Dan Sexton	5'10"	170	April 29, 1987	Apple Valley, Minnesota	HC Neftekhimik Nizhnekamsk
F	90	Anders Lee	6'3"	227	July 3, 1990	Edina, Minnesota	New York Islanders

=== 2016 IIHF World Championship ===
- Finished 4th

Position	Jersey #	Name	Height (in)	Weight (lb)	Birthdate	Hometown	2015–2016 team
G	1	Keith Kinkaid	6'3"	195	July 4, 1989	Farmingville, New York	New Jersey Devils
G	30	Mike Condon	6'2"	197	April 27, 1990	Holliston, Massachusetts	Montreal Canadiens
G	31	Thatcher Demko	6'4"	210	December 8, 1995	San Diego, California	Boston College
D	5	Connor Murphy (A)	6'4"	212	March 23, 1993	Dublin, Ohio	Arizona Coyotes
D	6	Chris Wideman	5'10"	180	January 7, 1990	St. Louis, Missouri	Ottawa Senators
D	15	Noah Hanifin	6'3"	206	January 25, 1997	Norwood, Massachusetts	Carolina Hurricanes
D	16	Steven Santini	6'2"	208	March 7, 1995	Mahopac, New York	Boston College
D	29	Jake McCabe	6'0"	214	October 12, 1993	Eau Claire, Wisconsin	Buffalo Sabres
D	55	David Warsofsky	5'9"	170	May 30, 1990	Marshfield, Massachusetts	New Jersey Devils
D	76	Brady Skjei	6'3"	206	March 26, 1994	Lakeville, Minnesota	New York Rangers
F	7	J. T. Compher	5'11"	193	April 8, 1995	Northbrook, Illinois	University of Michigan
F	10	Jordan Schroeder	5'9"	184	September 29, 1990	Lakeville, Minnesota	Minnesota Wild
F	11	Brock Nelson	6'3"	206	October 15, 1991	Warroad, Minnesota	New York Islanders
F	14	Tyler Motte	5'9"	190	March 10, 1995	St. Clair, Michigan	University of Michigan
F	18	Kyle Connor	6'1"	175	December 9, 1996	Shelby Township, Michigan	University of Michigan
F	19	Patrick Maroon	6'3"	230	April 23, 1988	St. Louis, Missouri	Edmonton Oilers
F	21	Dylan Larkin	6'1"	190	July 30, 1996	Waterford, Michigan	Detroit Red Wings
F	23	Matt Hendricks (C)	6'0"	207	June 17, 1981	Blaine, Minnesota	Edmonton Oilers
F	24	Hudson Fasching	6'2"	216	July 28, 1995	Apple Valley, Minnesota	Buffalo Sabres
F	28	Miles Wood	6'1"	195	September 13, 1995	Buffalo, New York	Boston College
F	34	Auston Matthews	6'2"	194	September 17, 1997	Scottsdale, Arizona	ZSC Lions
F	48	Vinnie Hinostroza	5'10"	180	April 3, 1994	Bartlett, Illinois	Rockford IceHogs
F	71	Nick Foligno (A)	6'0"	210	October 31, 1987	Buffalo, New York	Columbus Blue Jackets
F	72	Frank Vatrano	5'9"	201	March 14, 1990	Springfield, Massachusetts	Boston Bruins

=== 2017 IIHF World Championship ===
- Finished 5th

Position	Jersey #	Name	Height (in)	Weight (lb)	Birthdate	Hometown	2016–2017 team
G	35	Jimmy Howard	6'1"	218	March 26, 1984	Syracuse, New York	Detroit Red Wings
G	37	Connor Hellebuyck	6'4"	207	May 19, 1993	Commerce, Michigan	Winnipeg Jets
G	40	Cal Petersen	6'3"	190	October 19, 1994	Waterloo, Iowa	University of Notre Dame
D	5	Connor Murphy (C)	6'4"	212	March 23, 1993	Dublin, Ohio	Arizona Coyotes
D	6	Daniel Brickley	6'3"	205	March 30, 1995	Sandy, Utah	Minnesota State University
D	8	Jacob Trouba	6'3"	202	February 26, 1994	Rochester, Michigan	Winnipeg Jets
D	25	Charlie McAvoy	6'0"	208	December 21, 1997	Long Beach, New York	Boston Bruins
D	55	Noah Hanifin	6'3"	206	January 25, 1997	Norwood, Massachusetts	Carolina Hurricanes
D	57	Trevor van Riemsdyk	6'2"	188	July 24, 1991	Middletown, New Jersey	Chicago Blackhawks
D	65	Danny DeKeyser	6'3"	192	March 7, 1990	Detroit, Michigan	Detroit Red Wings
D	76	Brady Skjei	6'3"	211	March 26, 1994	Lakeville, Minnesota	New York Rangers
F	7	J. T. Compher	6'0"	193	April 8, 1995	Northbrook, Illinois	Colorado Avalanche
F	9	Andrew Copp	6'1"	206	July 8, 1994	Ann Arbor, Michigan	Winnipeg Jets
F	10	Anders Bjork	6'0"	181	August 5, 1996	Mequon, Wisconsin	University of Notre Dame
F	12	Jordan Greenway	6'5"	230	February 16, 1997	Canton, New York	Boston University
F	13	Johnny Gaudreau	5'9"	157	August 13, 1993	Salem, New Jersey	Calgary Flames
F	14	Nick Bjugstad	6'6"	218	July 17, 1991	Minneapolis, Minnesota	Florida Panthers
F	15	Jack Eichel	6'2"	196	October 28, 1996	North Chelmsford, Massachusetts	Buffalo Sabres
F	17	Nick Schmaltz	6'0"	177	February 23, 1996	Madison, Wisconsin	Chicago Blackhawks
F	18	Christian Dvorak	6'0"	187	February 2, 1996	Palos, Illinois	Arizona Coyotes
F	19	Clayton Keller	5'10"	168	July 29, 1998	St. Louis, Missouri	Arizona Coyotes
F	21	Dylan Larkin (A)	6'1"	190	July 30, 1996	Waterford, Michigan	Detroit Red Wings
F	26	Kevin Hayes	6'5"	215	May 8, 1992	Dorchester, Massachusetts	New York Rangers
F	27	Anders Lee	6'3"	228	July 3, 1990	Edina, Minnesota	New York Islanders
F	29	Brock Nelson (A)	6'3"	206	October 15, 1991	Warroad, Minnesota	New York Islanders

=== 2018 IIHF World Championship ===
- Won bronze medal

Position	Jersey #	Name	Height (in)	Weight (lb)	Birthdate	Hometown	2017–2018 team
G	1	Keith Kinkaid	6'3"	195	July 4, 1989	Farmingville, New York	New Jersey Devils
G	33	Scott Darling	6'6"	231	December 22, 1988	Lemont, Illinois	Carolina Hurricanes
G	35	Charlie Lindgren	6'2"	190	December 18, 1993	Lakeville, Minnesota	Montreal Canadiens
D	4	Will Butcher	5'10"	190	January 6, 1995	Sun Prairie, Wisconsin	New Jersey Devils
D	5	Connor Murphy (A)	6'4"	212	March 23, 1993	Dublin, Ohio	Chicago Blackhawks
D	14	Nick Jensen	6'0"	194	September 21, 1990	Saint Paul, Minnesota	Detroit Red Wings
D	23	Alec Martinez	6'1"	215	July 26, 1987	Rochester Hills, Michigan	Los Angeles Kings
D	43	Quinn Hughes	5'9"	168	October 14, 1999	Orlando, Florida	University of Michigan
D	44	Neal Pionk	5'11"	181	July 29, 1995	Hermantown, Minnesota	New York Rangers
D	73	Charlie McAvoy	6'0"	208	December 21, 1997	Long Beach, New York	Boston Bruins
D	82	Jordan Oesterle	6'0"	182	June 25, 1992	Dearborn Heights, Michigan	Chicago Blackhawks
F	3	Nick Bonino	6'1"	196	April 20, 1988	Hartford, Connecticut	Nashville Predators
F	7	Derek Ryan	5'11"	170	December 29, 1986	Spokane, Washington	Carolina Hurricanes
F	12	Alex DeBrincat	5'7"	165	December 18, 1997	Farmington Hills, Michigan	Chicago Blackhawks
F	13	Johnny Gaudreau	5'9"	157	August 13, 1993	Salem, New Jersey	Calgary Flames
F	20	Chris Kreider	6'3"	225	April 30, 1991	Boxford, Massachusetts	New York Rangers
F	21	Dylan Larkin (A)	6'1"	190	July 30, 1996	Waterford, Michigan	Detroit Red Wings
F	22	Sonny Milano	6'0"	194	May 12, 1996	Massapequa, New York	Columbus Blue Jackets
F	25	Blake Coleman	5'11"	201	November 28, 1991	Plano, Texas	New Jersey Devils
F	27	Anders Lee	6'3"	228	July 3, 1990	Edina, Minnesota	New York Islanders
F	29	Tage Thompson	6'5"	201	October 30, 1997	Orange, Connecticut	St. Louis Blues
F	36	Colin White	6'1"	190	January 30, 1997	Hanover, Massachusetts	Ottawa Senators
F	39	Brian Gibbons	5'8"	174	February 26, 1988	Braintree, Massachusetts	New Jersey Devils
F	88	Patrick Kane (C)	5'11"	176	November 19, 1988	Buffalo, New York	Chicago Blackhawks
F	89	Cam Atkinson	5'8"	179	June 5, 1989	Riverside, Connecticut	Columbus Blue Jackets

=== 2019 IIHF World Championship ===
- Finished 7th

Position	Jersey #	Name	Height (in)	Weight (lb)	Birthdate	Hometown	2018–2019 team
G	1	Cayden Primeau	6'3"	198	August 11, 1999	Voorhees, New Jersey	Laval Rocket
G	30	Thatcher Demko	6'4"	192	December 8, 1995	San Diego, California	Vancouver Canucks
G	35	Cory Schneider	6'3"	200	March 18, 1986	Marblehead, Massachusetts	New Jersey Devils
D	7	Zach Werenski	6'2"	209	July 19, 1997	Grosse Pointe Woods, Michigan	Columbus Blue Jackets
D	8	Adam Fox	5'10"	185	February 17, 1998	Jericho, New York	Harvard University
D	20	Ryan Suter (A)	6'2"	208	January 21, 1985	Madison, Wisconsin	Minnesota Wild
D	27	Alec Martinez	6'1"	209	July 26, 1987	Rochester Hills, Michigan	Los Angeles Kings
D	43	Quinn Hughes	5'10"	170	October 14, 1999	Orlando, Florida	Vancouver Canucks
D	55	Noah Hanifin	6'3"	215	January 25, 1997	Norwood, Massachusetts	Calgary Flames
D	76	Brady Skjei	6'3"	214	March 26, 1994	Lakeville, Minnesota	New York Rangers
D	86	Christian Wolanin	6'2"	185	March 17, 1995	Rochester, Michigan	Ottawa Senators
F	6	Jack Hughes	5'10"	170	May 14, 2001	Orlando, Florida	New Jersey Devils
F	9	Jack Eichel	6'2"	200	October 28, 1996	North Chelmsford, Massachusetts	Buffalo Sabres
F	10	Derek Ryan	5'10"	185	December 29, 1986	Spokane, Washington	Calgary Flames
F	11	Luke Kunin	6'0"	192	December 4, 1997	Chesterfield, Missouri	Minnesota Wild
F	12	Alex DeBrincat	5'7"	165	December 18, 1997	Farmington Hills, Michigan	Chicago Blackhawks
F	13	Johnny Gaudreau	5'9"	165	August 13, 1993	Salem, New Jersey	Calgary Flames
F	18	Chris Kreider	6'3"	220	April 30, 1991	Boxford, Massachusetts	New York Rangers
F	19	Clayton Keller	5'10"	170	July 29, 1998	St. Louis, Missouri	Arizona Coyotes
F	21	Dylan Larkin (A)	6'1"	198	July 30, 1996	Waterford, Michigan	Detroit Red Wings
F	25	James van Riemsdyk	6'3"	217	July 26, 1987	Middletown, New Jersey	Philadelphia Flyers
F	36	Colin White	6'0"	183	January 30, 1997	Hanover, Massachusetts	Ottawa Senators
F	41	Luke Glendening	5'11"	192	April 28, 1989	Grand Rapids, Michigan	Detroit Red Wings
F	72	Frank Vatrano	5'9"	201	March 14, 1994	East Longmeadow, Massachusetts	Florida Panthers
F	88	Patrick Kane (C)	5'10"	177	November 19, 1988	Buffalo, New York	Chicago Blackhawks

== Canada Cup ==
=== 1976 Canada Cup ===
(finished 5th)

Position	Jersey #	Name	Height (cm)	Weight (kg)	Birthdate	Birthplace	Previous club/team
G	30	Mike Curran	175	78	April 14, 1944	International Falls, Minnesota	Minnesota Fighting Saints (WHA)
G	1	Pete LoPresti	183	91	May 23, 1954	Virginia, Minnesota	Minnesota North Stars
G	35	Cap Raeder	183	82	October 8, 1953	Needham, Massachusetts	New England Whalers (WHA)
D	5	Mike Christie	183	86	December 20, 1949	Big Spring, Texas	California Seals
D	20	Lee Fogolin	183	91	February 7, 1955	Chicago, Illinois	Buffalo Sabres
D	7	Mike Milbury	185	93	June 17, 1952	Brighton, Massachusetts	Boston Bruins
D	2	Bill Nyrop	188	93	July 23, 1952	Washington, D.C.	Montreal Canadiens
D	4	Gary Sargent	178	91	February 18, 1954	Red Lake, Minnesota	Los Angeles Kings
D/F	3	Rick Chartraw	183	93	July 13, 1954	Caracas, Venezuela	Montreal Canadiens
D/F	23	Lou Nanne	183	82	June 2, 1941	Sault Ste. Marie, Ontario, Canada	Minnesota North Stars
F/D	18	Joe Noris	183	84	October 26, 1951	Denver, Colorado	San Diego Mariners (WHA)
LW	14	Curt Bennett	191	89	March 27, 1948	Regina, Saskatchewan, Canada	Atlanta Flames
LW	29	Alan Hangsleben	185	89	February 22, 1953	Warroad, Minnesota	New England Whalers (WHA)
LW	12	Steve Jensen	188	86	April 14, 1955	Minneapolis, Minnesota	Minnesota North Stars
LW	9	Gerry O'Flaherty	175	79	August 31, 1950	Pittsburgh, Pennsylvania	Vancouver Canucks
C	17	Harvey Bennett	193	98	August 9, 1952	Cranston, Rhode Island	Pittsburgh Penguins
C	32	Doug Palazzari	165	77	November 3, 1952	Eveleth, Minnesota	Providence Reds (AHL)
RW	34	Fred Ahern	183	82	February 12, 1952	Boston, Massachusetts	California Seals
RW	19	Craig Patrick	185	86	May 20, 1946	Detroit, Michigan	Kansas City Scouts
RW	15	Dean Talafous	193	82	August 25, 1953	Duluth, Minnesota	Minnesota North Stars
RW	28	Warren "Butch" Williams	180	89	September 11, 1952	Duluth, Minnesota	California Seals
F	21	Dan Bolduc	175	86	April 6, 1953	Waterville, Maine	New England Whalers (WHA)
F	8	Robbie Ftorek	178	70	January 2, 1952	Needham, Massachusetts	Phoenix Roadrunners (WHA)
F	33	Mike Polich	173	77	December 19, 1952	Hibbing, Minnesota	Nova Scotia Voyageurs (AHL)

=== 1981 Canada Cup ===
(finished 4th)

Position	Jersey #	Name	Height (cm)	Weight (kg)	Birthdate	Birthplace	1980–1981 team
G	31	Steve Baker	191	91	May 6, 1957	Boston, Massachusetts	New York Rangers
G	35	Tony Esposito	180	84	April 23, 1943	Sault Ste. Marie, Ontario, Canada	Chicago Blackhawks
D	4	Bill Baker	185	88	November 29, 1956	Grand Rapids, Minnesota	Colorado Rockies
D	3	Richie Dunn	183	88	May 12, 1957	Boston, Massachusetts	Buffalo Sabres
D	5	Mark Howe	180	86	May 28, 1955	Detroit, Michigan	Hartford Whalers
D	26	Dave Langevin	185	98	May 15, 1954	St. Paul, Minnesota	New York Islanders
D	23	Rod Langway	191	99	May 3, 1957	Taipei, Taiwan, Republic of China	Montreal Canadiens
D	28	Reed Larson	183	88	July 30, 1956	Minneapolis, Minnesota	Detroit Red Wings
D	6	Ken Morrow	193	95	October 17, 1956	Flint, Michigan	New York Islanders
D	20	Mike O'Connell	175	84	November 25, 1955	Chicago, Illinois	Chicago Blackhawks
F	8	Robbie Ftorek	178	70	January 2, 1952	Needham, Massachusetts	Quebec Nordiques
C	7	Neal Broten	175	70	November 29, 1959	Roseau, Minnesota	Minnesota North Stars
C	25	Steve Christoff	185	82	January 23, 1958	Richfield, Minnesota	Minnesota North Stars
C	18	Mike Eaves	178	82	June 10, 1956	Denver, Colorado	Minnesota North Stars
C	9	Mark Johnson	175	73	September 22, 1957	Minneapolis, Minnesota	Pittsburgh Penguins
C	15	Rob McClanahan	178	82	January 9, 1958	Saint Paul, Minnesota	Buffalo Sabres
C	14	Bob Miller	178	80	September 28, 1956	Medford, Massachusetts	Boston Bruins
RW	13	Dave Christian	180	77	May 12, 1959	Warroad, Minnesota	Winnipeg Jets
RW	21	Tom Gorence	183	86	March 11, 1957	St. Paul, Minnesota	Philadelphia Flyers
RW	27	Warren Miller	180	82	June 15, 1953	St. Paul, Minnesota	Hartford Whalers
RW	19	Dean Talafous	193	82	August 25, 1953	Duluth, Minnesota	New York Rangers
RW	29	Tom Younghans	180	80	January 22, 1953	St. Paul, Minnesota	Minnesota North Stars

=== 1984 Canada Cup ===
(finished 4th)

Position	Jersey #	Name	Height (cm)	Weight (kg)	Birthdate	Birthplace	1983–1984 team
G	31	Tom Barrasso	190	95	March 31, 1965	Boston, Massachusetts	Buffalo Sabres
G	1	Glenn Resch	175	88	July 10, 1948	Moose Jaw, Saskatchewan, Canada	New Jersey Devils
D	21	Chris Chelios	185	86	January 25, 1962	Evergreen Park, Illinois	Montreal Canadiens
D	2	Mark Fusco	175	82	March 12, 1961	Woburn, Massachusetts	Hartford Whalers
D	22	Tom Hirsch	193	95	January 27, 1963	Minneapolis, Minnesota	Minnesota North Stars
D	4	Phil Housley	178	84	September 3, 1964	South St. Paul, Minnesota	Buffalo Sabres
D	5	Rod Langway	191	99	May 3, 1957	Taipei, Taiwan, Republic of China	Washington Capitals
D	3	Mike Ramsey	191	86	December 18, 1960	Minneapolis, Minnesota	Buffalo Sabres
D	10	Gordie Roberts	183	88	October 2, 1957	Detroit, Michigan	Minnesota North Stars
F	23	Aaron Broten	178	79	November 14, 1960	Roseau, Minnesota	New Jersey Devils
LW	98	Brian Lawton	183	82	June 29, 1965	New Brunswick, New Jersey	Minnesota North Stars
LW	20	Brian Mullen	178	82	March 16, 1962	New York	Winnipeg Jets
C	13	Bob Brooke	188	94	December 18, 1960	Melrose, Massachusetts	New York Rangers
C	8	Neal Broten	175	70	November 29, 1959	Roseau, Minnesota	Minnesota North Stars
C	9	Bob Carpenter	183	91	July 13, 1963	Beverly, Massachusetts	Washington Capitals
C	11	Ed Olczyk	185	89	August 16, 1966	Chicago	Stratford Cullitons (GOJHL)
C	19	Bryan Trottier	180	81	July 17, 1956	Val Marie, Saskatchewan, Canada	New York Islanders
RW	27	Dave Christian	180	77	May 12, 1959	Warroad, Minnesota	Washington Capitals
RW	24	Bryan Erickson	175	77	March 7, 1960	Roseau, Minnesota	Washington Capitals
RW	25	David A. Jensen	185	79	August 19, 1965	Newton, Massachusetts	Belmont Hill Academy (ISL)
RW	15	Joe Mullen	178	83	February 26, 1957	New York	St. Louis Blues

=== 1987 Canada Cup ===
(finished 5th)

Position	Jersey #	Name	Height (cm)	Weight (kg)	Birthdate	Birthplace	1986–1987 team
G	1	Tom Barrasso	190	95	March 31, 1965	Boston, Massachusetts	Buffalo Sabres
G	31	Bob Mason	185	82	April 22, 1961	International Falls, Minnesota	Washington Capitals
G	34	John Vanbiesbrouck	173	80	September 4, 1963	Detroit, Michigan	New York Rangers
D	24	Chris Chelios	185	86	January 25, 1962	Evergreen Park, Illinois	Montreal Canadiens
D	2	Dave Ellett	188	93	March 30, 1964	Cleveland, Ohio	Winnipeg Jets
D	4	Kevin Hatcher	193	102	September 9, 1966	Detroit, Michigan	Washington Capitals
D	6	Phil Housley	178	84	March 9, 1964	St. Paul, Minnesota	Buffalo Sabres
D	5	Rod Langway	191	99	May 3, 1957	Taipei, Taiwan, Republic of China	Washington Capitals
D	3	Mike Ramsey	191	86	December 18, 1960	Minneapolis, Minnesota	Buffalo Sabres
D	20	Gary Suter	183	93	June 24, 1964	Madison, Wisconsin	Calgary Flames
F	10	Aaron Broten	178	79	November 14, 1960	Roseau, Minnesota	New Jersey Devils
LW	8	Curt Fraser	183	91	January 12, 1958	Cincinnati, Ohio	Chicago Blackhawks
LW	11	Kelly Miller	178	84	March 3, 1963	Detroit, Michigan	Washington Capitals
C	13	Bob Brooke	188	94	December 18, 1960	Melrose, Massachusetts	New York Rangers
C	21	Bob Carpenter	183	91	July 13, 1963	Beverly, Massachusetts	Los Angeles Kings
C	12	Mark Johnson	175	73	September 22, 1957	Minneapolis, Minnesota	New Jersey Devils
C	16	Pat LaFontaine	178	83	February 22, 1965	St. Louis, Missouri	New York Islanders
C	9	Corey Millen	170	75	March 30, 1964	Duluth, Minnesota	University of Minnesota (WCHA)
C	26	Ed Olczyk	185	89	August 16, 1966	Chicago, Illinois	Chicago Blackhawks
C	29	Joel Otto	193	100	October 29, 1961	Elk River, Minnesota	Calgary Flames
RW	7	Joe Mullen	178	83	February 26, 1957	New York	Calgary Flames
RW	30	Chris Nilan	183	93	February 9, 1958	Boston	Montreal Canadiens
RW	14	Wayne Presley	180	82	March 23, 1965	Dearborn, Michigan	Chicago Blackhawks

=== 1991 Canada Cup ===
(finished 2nd)

Position	Jersey #	Name	Height (cm)	Weight (kg)	Birthdate	Birthplace	1990–1991 team
G	35	Pat Jablonski	188	85	June 20, 1967	Toledo, Ohio	St. Louis Blues
G	1	Mike Richter	180	84	September 22, 1966	Abington, Pennsylvania	New York Rangers
G	34	John Vanbiesbrouck	173	80	September 4, 1963	Detroit, Michigan	New York Rangers
D	26	Chris Chelios	185	86	January 25, 1962	Evergreen Park, Illinois	Chicago Blackhawks
D	4	Kevin Hatcher	193	102	September 9, 1966	Detroit, Michigan	Washington Capitals
D	6	Jim Johnson	185	86	August 9, 1962	New Hope, Minnesota	Pittsburgh Penguins
D	2	Brian Leetch	185	91	March 3, 1968	Corpus Christi, Texas	New York Rangers
D	20	Gary Suter	183	93	June 24, 1964	Madison, Wisconsin	Calgary Flames
D	38	Eric Weinrich	185	95	December 19, 1966	Roanoke, Virginia	New Jersey Devils
D	39	Craig Wolanin	191	93	July 27, 1967	Grosse Pointe, Michigan	Quebec Nordiques
LW	21	Tony Granato	178	84	July 25, 1964	Hinsdale, Illinois	Los Angeles Kings
LW	33	Randy Wood	183	89	October 12, 1963	Princeton, New Jersey	New York Islanders
C	23	Craig Janney	185	89	September 26, 1967	Hartford, Connecticut	Boston Bruins
C	16	Pat LaFontaine	178	83	February 22, 1965	St. Louis, Missouri	New York Islanders
C	32	Kevin Miller	183	86	September 2, 1965	Lansing, Michigan	New York Rangers
C	9	Mike Modano	191	95	June 7, 1970	Livonia, Michigan	Minnesota North Stars
C	12	Ed Olczyk	185	89	August 16, 1966	Chicago, Illinois	Winnipeg Jets
C	29	Joel Otto	193	100	October 29, 1961	Elk River, Minnesota	Calgary Flames
C	17	Jeremy Roenick	183	93	January 17, 1970	Boston, Massachusetts	Chicago Blackhawks
RW	24	Doug Brown	178	84	June 12, 1964	Southborough, Massachusetts	New Jersey Devils
RW	27	Dave Christian	180	77	May 12, 1959	Warroad, Minnesota	Boston Bruins
RW	15	Brett Hull	178	92	August 9, 1964	Belleville, Ontario, Canada	St. Louis Blues
RW	7	Joe Mullen	178	83	February 26, 1957	New York	Pittsburgh Penguins

== World Cup of Hockey ==
=== 1996 World Cup of Hockey ===
(Won the inaugural tournament)

Position	Jersey number	Name	Height (cm)	Weight (kg)	Birthdate	Birthplace	1995-96 team
G	30	Jim Carey	188	86	31 May 1974	Dorchester, Massachusetts	(United States) Washington Capitals
G	31	Guy Hebert	180	84	7 January 1967	(New York (state)) Troy, New York	(United States) Mighty Ducks of Anaheim
G	35	Mike Richter	180	86	22 September 1966	Abington, Pennsylvania	(United States) New York Rangers
D	28	Shawn Chambers	188	91	11 October 1966	Sterling Heights, Michigan	(United States) New Jersey Devils
D	7	Chris Chelios	180	87	25 January 1962	Chicago, Illinois	(United States) Chicago Blackhawks
D	3	Derian Hatcher	196	107	4 June 1972	Sterling Heights, Michigan	(United States) Dallas Stars
D	4	Kevin Hatcher	191	105	9 September 1966	Detroit, Michigan	(United States) Dallas Stars
D	6	Phil Housley	178	84	9 March 1964	Saint Paul, Minnesota	(Canada) Calgary Flames
D	2	Brian Leetch - C	183	84	3 March 1968	Corpus Christi, Texas	(United States) New York Rangers
D	5	Mathieu Schneider	180	92	12 June 1969	(New York (state)) New York, New York	(Canada) Toronto Maple Leafs
D	20	Gary Suter	183	93	24 June 1964	Madison, Wisconsin	(United States) Chicago Blackhawks
LW	10	John LeClair	191	107	5 July 1969	St. Albans, Vermont	(United States) Philadelphia Flyers
LW	14	Shawn McEachern	180	88	28 February 1969	Waltham, Massachusetts	(United States) Boston Bruins
LW	17	Keith Tkachuk - A	188	105	28 March 1972	Boston, Massachusetts	(Canada) Winnipeg Jets
C	18	Adam Deadmarsh	183	93	10 May 1975	Trail, British Columbia	(United States) Colorado Avalanche
C	22	Steve Konowalchuk	185	88	11 November 1972	Salt Lake City, Utah	(United States) Washington Capitals
C	16	Pat LaFontaine	178	82	22 February 1965	St. Louis, Missouri	(United States) Buffalo Sabres
C	9	Mike Modano	191	95	7 June 1970	Livonia, Michigan	(United States) Dallas Stars
C	29	Joel Otto - A	193	100	29 October 1961	Elk River, Minnesota	(United States) Philadelphia Flyers
C	25	Brian Rolston	188	97	21 February 1973	Flint, Michigan	(United States) New Jersey Devils
C	8	Bryan Smolinski	185	93	27 December 1971	Toledo, Ohio	(United States) Pittsburgh Penguins
C	19	Doug Weight	180	89	21 January 1971	Warren, Michigan	(Canada) Edmonton Oilers
RW	11	Tony Amonte	183	92	2 August 1970	Hingham, Massachusetts	(United States) Chicago Blackhawks
RW	12	Bill Guerin	188	100	9 November 1970	Wilbraham, Massachusetts	(United States) New Jersey Devils
RW	15	Brett Hull	178	91	9 August 1964	Belleville, Ontario	(United States) St. Louis Blues
RW	21	Scott Young	183	86	1 October 1967	Clinton, Massachusetts	(United States) Colorado Avalanche

=== 2004 World Cup of Hockey ===
(finished 4th)

Position	Jersey number	Name	Height (cm)	Weight (kg)	Birthdate	Birthplace	2004-05 team
G	30	Ty Conklin	184	82	30 March 1976	Anchorage, Alaska	(Canada) Edmonton Oilers
G	29	Rick DiPietro	182	84	19 September 1981	Lewiston, Maine	(United States) New York Islanders
G	42	Robert Esche	187	95.5	22 January 1978	(New York (state)) Whitesboro, New York	(United States) Philadelphia Flyers
D	24	Chris Chelios	187	86.5	25 January 1962	Chicago, Illinois	None
D	20	Ken Klee	184	95.5	24 April 1971	Indianapolis, Indiana	(Canada) Toronto Maple Leafs
D	2	Brian Leetch	187	86.5	3 March 1968	Corpus Christi, Texas	(Canada) Toronto Maple Leafs
D	26	John-Michael Liles	179	84	25 November 1980	Zionsville, Indiana	(United States) Colorado Avalanche
D	10	Paul Martin	187	77	5 March 1981	Minneapolis, Minnesota	(United States) New Jersey Devils
D	3	Aaron Miller	193	95.5	11 August 1971	(New York (state)) Buffalo, New York	(United States) Los Angeles Kings
D	28	Brian Rafalski	177	86.5	28 September 1973	Dearborn, Michigan	(United States) New Jersey Devils
D	6	Eric Weinrich	187	94	19 December 1966	Roanoke, Virginia	(United States) St. Louis Blues
F	11	Tony Amonte	184	91	2 August 1970	Hingham, Massachusetts	(United States) Philadelphia Flyers
F	55	Jason Blake	179	82	2 September 1973	Moorhead, Minnesota	(United States) New York Islanders
F	33	Craig Conroy	189	89.5	4 September 1971	(New York (state)) Potsdam, New York	(United States) Los Angeles Kings
F	37	Chris Drury	179	82	20 August 1976	Trumbull, Connecticut	(United States) Buffalo Sabres
F	19	Scott Gomez	182	91	23 December 1979	Anchorage, Alaska	(United States) New Jersey Devils
F	13	Bill Guerin	189	95.5	9 November 1970	Worcester, Massachusetts	(United States) Dallas Stars
F	27	Jeff Halpern	184	91.5	3 May 1976	Potomac, Maryland	(United States) Washington Capitals
F	16	Brett Hull	182	92.5	9 August 1964	Belleville, Canada	(United States) Phoenix Coyotes
F	22	Steve Konowalchuk	189	94	11 November 1972	Salt Lake City, Utah	(United States) Colorado Avalanche
F	15	Jamie Langenbrunner	187	91	24 July 1975	Duluth, Minnesota	(United States) New Jersey Devils
F	9	Mike Modano	192	93	7 June 1970	Livonia, Michigan	(United States) Dallas Stars
F	12	Brian Rolston	189	95.5	21 February 1973	Flint, Michigan	(United States) Minnesota Wild
F	21	Bryan Smolinski	187	94.5	27 December 1971	Toledo, Ohio	(Canada) Ottawa Senators
F	7	Keith Tkachuk	189	102.5	28 March 1972	Melrose, Massachusetts	(United States) St. Louis Blues
F	39	Doug Weight	182	91	21 January 1971	Warren, Michigan	(United States) St. Louis Blues

=== 2016 World Cup of Hockey ===
- Finished 7th

Position	Jersey #	Name	Height (in)	Weight (lb)	Birthdate	Hometown	Current team
G	30	Ben Bishop	6'7"	216	November 21, 1986	Denver, Colorado	Tampa Bay Lightning
G	32	Jonathan Quick	6'1"	218	January 21, 1986	Milford, Connecticut	Los Angeles Kings
G	35	Cory Schneider	6'3"	205	March 18, 1986	Marblehead, Massachusetts	New Jersey Devils
D	2	Matt Niskanen	6'0"	200	December 6, 1986	Virginia, Minnesota	Washington Capitals
D	3	Jack Johnson	6'1"	230	January 13, 1987	Ann Arbor, Michigan	Columbus Blue Jackets
D	4	John Carlson	6'3"	215	January 10, 1990	Natick, Massachusetts	Washington Capitals
D	6	Erik Johnson	6'4"	236	March 21, 1988	Bloomington, Minnesota	Colorado Avalanche
D	20	Ryan Suter (A)	6'2"	206	January 21, 1985	Madison, Wisconsin	Minnesota Wild
D	27	Ryan McDonagh	6'1"	216	June 13, 1989	Saint Paul, Minnesota	New York Rangers
D	33	Dustin Byfuglien	6'5"	260	March 27, 1985	Roseau, Minnesota	Winnipeg Jets
F	8	Joe Pavelski (C)	5'11"	190	July 11, 1984	Plover, Wisconsin	San Jose Sharks
F	9	Zach Parise	5'11"	196	July 28, 1984	Minneapolis, Minnesota	Minnesota Wild
F	16	James van Riemsdyk	6'3"	209	May 4, 1989	Middletown, New Jersey	Toronto Maple Leafs
F	17	Ryan Kesler	6'2"	202	August 31, 1984	Livonia, Michigan	Anaheim Ducks
F	19	Brandon Dubinsky	6'2"	216	April 29, 1986	Anchorage, Alaska	Columbus Blue Jackets
F	21	Derek Stepan	6'0"	196	June 18, 1990	Hastings, Minnesota	New York Rangers
F	23	Kyle Palmieri	5'10"	185	February 1, 1991	Smithtown, New York	New Jersey Devils
F	26	Blake Wheeler	6'5"	225	August 31, 1986	Plymouth, Minnesota	Winnipeg Jets
F	42	David Backes	6'3"	221	May 1, 1984	Blaine, Minnesota	Boston Bruins
F	67	Max Pacioretty	6'2"	213	November 20, 1988	New Canaan, Connecticut	Montreal Canadiens
F	74	T. J. Oshie	5'11"	189	December 23, 1986	Warroad, Minnesota	Washington Capitals
F	88	Patrick Kane (A)	5'11"	177	November 19, 1988	Buffalo, New York	Chicago Blackhawks
F	89	Justin Abdelkader	6'2"	218	February 25, 1987	Muskegon, Michigan	Detroit Red Wings

== Men's World Junior Championships ==
=== 1999 World Junior ===
(finished 8th)

Position	Name	Height (cm)	Weight (kg)	Birthdate	Birthplace	Previous club/team	NHL rights, if any
G	Joe Blackburn	178	81	January 26, 1979	Livonia, Michigan	Michigan State University (CCHA)	1999 Draft eligible
G	Chris Madden	183	85	October 27, 1978	Liverpool, New York	Guelph Storm (OHL)	Carolina Hurricanes
D	Doug Janik	188	95	March 26, 1980	Agawam, Massachusetts	University of Maine (HE)	1999 Draft eligible
D	Jeff Jillson	191	102	July 24, 1980	North Smithfield, Rhode Island	University of Michigan(CCHA)	1999 Draft eligible
D	Jordan Leopold	185	91	August 3, 1980	Golden Valley, Minnesota	University of Minnesota (WCHA)	1999 Draft eligible
D	Paul Mara	193	99	September 7, 1979	Belmont, Massachusetts	Plymouth Whalers (OHL)	Tampa Bay Lightning
D	Chris St. Croix	191	91	May 2, 1979	Voorhees, New Jersey	Kamloops Blazers (WHL)	Calgary Flames
D	Dave Tanabe	185	96	July 19, 1980	White Bear Lake, Minnesota	University of Wisconsin (WCHA)	1999 Draft eligible
D	Nikos Tselios	196	100	January 20, 1979	Oak Park, Illinois	Plymouth Whalers (OHL)	Carolina Hurricanes
F	Dan Carlson	178	86	April 6, 1979	Edina, Minnesota	Notre Dame University (CCHA)	1999 Draft eligible
F	Tim Connolly	185	86	May 7, 1981	Baldwinsville, New York	Erie Otters (OHL)	New York Islanders
F	Matt Doman	180	93	February 10, 1980	Crystal Lake, Illinois	University of Wisconsin (WCHA)	1999 Draft eligible
F	Brian Gionta	170	78	January 18, 1979	Rochester, New York	Boston College (HE)	New Jersey Devils
F	Scott Gomez	182	91	December 23, 1979	Anchorage, Alaska	Tri-City Americans (WHL)	New Jersey Devils
F	Adam Hall	191	94	August 14, 1980	Kalamazoo, Michigan	Michigan State University(CCHA)	1999 Draft eligible
F	Barrett Heisten	185	88	March 19, 1980	Anchorage, Alaska	University of Maine (HE)	1999 Draft eligible
F	Andy Hilbert	180	88	February 6, 1981	Howell, Michigan	U.S. national under-18 team	2000 Draft eligible
F	David Legwand	188	86	August 17, 1980	Detroit, Michigan	Plymouth Whalers (OHL)	Nashville Predators
F	Justin Morrison	191	100	August 10, 1979,	Los Angeles, California	Colorado College (WCHA)	Vancouver Canucks
F	Ryan Murphy	185	93	March 21, 1979	Van Nuys, California	Bowling Green State University (CCHA)	1999 Draft eligible
F	Mike Pandolfo	191	102	September 15, 1979	Winchester, Massachusetts	Boston University (HE)	Buffalo Sabres
F	Mike Vigilante	183	88	August 19, 1979	Dearborn, Michigan	Lake Superior State University (CCHA)	1999 Draft eligible

=== 2000 World Junior ===
(finished 4th)

Position	Jersey #	Name	Height (cm)	Weight (kg)	Birthdate	Birthplace	1999–2000 team	NHL Rights
G	29	Rick DiPietro	185	95	September 19, 1981	Winthrop, Massachusetts	Boston University (ECAC)	New York Islanders
G	30	Philippe Sauve	183	79	February 27, 1980	Buffalo, New York	Hull Olympiques (QMJHL)	Colorado Avalanche
D	5	Patrick Aufiero	188	93	July 1, 1980	Winchester, Massachusetts	Boston University (ECAC)	New York Rangers
D	2	Ron Hainsey	191	95	March 24, 1981	Bolton, Connecticut	University of Massachusetts Lowell (HE)	Montreal Canadiens
D	22	Doug Janik	188	95	March 26, 1980	Agawam, Massachusetts	University of Maine (HE)	Buffalo Sabres
D	6	Jeff Jillson	191	102	July 24, 1980	North Smithfield, Rhode Island	University of Michigan (ECAC)	San Jose Sharks
D	4	Jordan Leopold	185	91	August 3, 1980	Golden Valley, Minnesota	University of Minnesota (WCHA)	Mighty Ducks of Anaheim
D	3	Brooks Orpik	188	99	September 26, 1980	San Francisco, California	Boston College (HE)	Pittsburgh Penguins
D	10	Mike Stuart	183	91	August 31, 1980	Rochester, Minnesota	Colorado College (WCHA)	Nashville Predators
F	15	Dan Cavanaugh	188	88	March 3, 1980	Springfield, Massachusetts	Boston University (ECAC)	Calgary Flames
F	9	Connor Dunlop	178	84	January 5, 1981	St. Louis, Missouri	Notre Dame (CCHA)	Undrafted
F	25	Patrick Foley	185	100	January 24, 1981	Milton, Massachusetts	University of New Hampshire (HE)	Pittsburgh Penguins
F	18	Adam Hall	191	94	August 14, 1980	Kalamazoo, Michigan	Michigan State University (CCHA)	Nashville Predators
F	27	Barrett Heisten	185	88	March 19, 1980	Anchorage, Alaska	University of Maine (HE)	Buffalo Sabres
F	11	Brett Henning	185	91	May 7, 1980	Huntington, New York	Notre Dame (CCHA)	New York Islanders
F	19	Andy Hilbert	180	88	February 6, 1981	Howell, Michigan	University of Michigan (ECAC)	Boston Bruins
F	21	David Inman	185	84	June 13, 1980	New York	Notre Dame (CCHA)	New York Rangers
F	7	Willie Levesque	183	82	January 22, 1980	Oak Bluffs, Massachusetts	Northeastern University (HE)	San Jose Sharks
F	26	Brett Nowak	188	89	May 20, 1981	New Haven, Connecticut	Harvard University (ECAC)	Boston Bruins
F	16	John Sabo	173	75	September 4, 1981	Harding Township, New Jersey	Boston University (ECAC)	Undrafted
F	23	Jeff Taffe	191	94	February 19, 1981	Hastings, Minnesota	University of Minnesota (WCHA)	St. Louis Blues
F	8	Brad Winchester	196	103	March 1, 1981	Madison, Wisconsin	University of Wisconsin (WCHA)	Edmonton Oilers

=== 2001 World Junior ===
(finished 5th)

Position	Jersey #	Name	Height (cm)	Weight (kg)	Birthdate	Birthplace	2000–2001 team	NHL rights
G	29	Rick DiPietro	185	95	September 19, 1981	Winthrop, Massachusetts	Chicago Wolves (IHL)	New York Islanders
G	1	Craig Kowalski	173	88	January 15, 1981	Warren, Michigan	Northern Michigan University	Carolina Hurricanes
D	5	J.D. Forrest	175	84	April 15, 1981	Auburn, New York	Boston College	Carolina Hurricanes
D	4	Tim Gleason	183	98	January 29, 1983	Clawson, Michigan	Windsor Spitfires (OHL)	Ottawa Senators
D	2	Ron Hainsey	191	95	March 24, 1981	Bolton, Connecticut	Quebec Citadelles (AHL)	Montreal Canadiens
D	7	David Hale	187	100	June 18, 1981	Colorado Springs, Colorado	University of North Dakota	New Jersey Devils
D	6	Mike Komisarek	194	104	January 19, 1982	Islip Terrace, New York	University of Michigan	Montreal Canadiens
D	27	Paul Martin	187	77	March 5, 1981	Minneapolis, Minnesota	University of Minnesota	New Jersey Devils
D	28	Freddy Meyer	178	87	January 4, 1981	Sanbornville, New Hampshire	Boston University	Undrafted
F	10	Marc Cavosie	183	82	August 6, 1981	Albany, New York	R.P.I.	Minnesota Wild
F	24	Jon DiSalvatore	185	91	March 30, 1981	Bangor, Maine	Providence College	San Jose Sharks
F	9	Connor Dunlop	178	84	January 5, 1981	St. Louis, Missouri	Notre Dame	Undrafted
F	18	Rob Globke	183	93	October 24, 1982	West Bloomfield, Michigan	Notre Dame	Florida Panthers
F	19	Andy Hilbert	180	88	February 6, 1981	Howell, Michigan	University of Michigan	Boston Bruins
F	26	Brett Nowak	188	89	May 20, 1981	New Haven, Connecticut	Harvard University	Boston Bruins
F	21	Troy Riddle	179	80	August 24, 1981	Minneapolis	University of Minnesota	St. Louis Blues
F	11	John Sabo	173	75	September 4, 1981	Harding Township, New Jersey	Boston University	Undrafted
F	14	David Steckel	194	91	March 15, 1982	West Bend, Wisconsin	Ohio State University	Los Angeles Kings
F	15	Damian Surma	175	91	January 22, 1981	Detroit, Michigan	Plymouth Whalers (OHL)	Carolina Hurricanes
F	23	Jeff Taffe	191	94	February 19, 1981	Hastings, Minnesota	University of Minnesota	St. Louis Blues
F	20	R. J. Umberger	181	91	May 3, 1982	Pittsburgh, Pennsylvania	Ohio State University	Vancouver Canucks
F	12	Kris Vernarsky	189	89	April 5, 1982	Warren, Michigan	Plymouth Whalers (OHL)	Toronto Maple Leafs

=== 2002 World Junior ===
(finished 5th)

Position	Jersey number	Name	Height (cm)	Weight (kg)	Birthdate	Birthplace	2001-02 team	NHL rights, if any
G	29	Jason Bacashihua	187	75	20 September 1982	Dearborn Heights, Michigan	(United States) Plymouth Whalers	(United States) Dallas Stars
G	1	Dwight LaBrosse	187	77	6 October 1983	McMurray, Pennsylvania	(Canada) Guelph Storm	2002 Draft eligible
D	2	Keith Ballard	182	91	26 November 1982	Baudette, Minnesota	(United States) University of Minnesota	2002 Draft eligible
D	31	Joey Hope	184	79	1 January 1982	Anchorage, Alaska	(United States) Portland Winter Hawks	2002 Draft eligible
D	8	Mike Komisarek	194	104	19 January 1982	(New York (state)) Islip Terrace, New York	(United States) University of Michigan	(Canada) Montreal Canadiens
D	26	Bryce Lampman	187	88	31 August 1982	Rochester, Minnesota	(United States) University of Nebraska-Omaha	(United States) New York Rangers
D	13	Brett Lebda	179	85	15 January 1982	Buffalo Grove, Illinois	(United States) University of Notre Dame	2002 Draft eligible
D	5	Erik Reitz	184	87	29 July 1982	Plymouth, Michigan	(Canada) Barrie Colts	(United States) Minnesota Wild
D	6	Noah Welch	192	97	26 August 1982	Brighton, Massachusetts	(United States) Harvard University	(United States) Pittsburgh Penguins
D	3	Ryan Whitney	194	87	19 February 1983	Scituate, Massachusetts	(United States) Boston University	2002 Draft eligible
F	23	Dustin Brown	187	82	4 November 1984	(New York (state)) Ithaca, New York	(Canada) Guelph Storm	2003 Draft eligible
F	9	Ben Eaves	174	80	27 March 1982	Faribault, Minnesota	(United States) Boston College	(United States) Pittsburgh Penguins
F	18	Rob Globke	183	93	24 October 1982	West Bloomfield, Michigan	(United States) University of Notre Dame	2002 Draft eligible
F	24	Dwight Helminen	179	84	22 June 1983	Brighton, Michigan	(United States) University of Michigan	2002 Draft eligible
F	21	Chris Higgins	177	86	2 June 1983	(New York (state)) Smithtown, New York	(United States) Yale University	2002 Draft eligible
F	11	Ryan Hollweg	182	84	23 April 1983	Downey, California	(Canada) Medicine Hat Tigers	(United States) New York Rangers
F	16	Gregg Johnson	182	83	18 June 1982	Windsor, Connecticut	(United States) Boston University	(Canada) Ottawa Senators
F	10	Chad LaRose	179	77	27 March 1982	Fraser, Michigan	(United States) Plymouth Whalers	2002 Draft eligible
F	19	Jim Slater	182	75	9 December 1982	Detroit, Michigan	(United States) Michigan State University	2002 Draft eligible
F	14	David Steckel	194	91	15 March 1982	West Bend, Wisconsin	(United States) Ohio State University	(United States) Los Angeles Kings
F	22	R. J. Umberger	181	91	3 May 1982	Pittsburgh, Pennsylvania	(United States) Ohio State University	(Canada) Vancouver Canucks
F	12	Kris Vernarsky	189	89	5 April 1982	Warren, Michigan	(United States) Plymouth Whalers	2002 Draft eligible

=== 2003 World Junior ===
(finished 4th)

Position	Jersey #	Name	Height (cm)	Weight (kg)	Birthdate	Birthplace	2002–2003 team	NHL rights, if any
G	29	Bob Goepfert	178	77	May 9, 1983	Kings Park, New York	Providence College	Pittsburgh Penguins
G	30	Jimmy Howard	183	93	March 26, 1984	Syracuse, New York	University of Maine	2003 Draft eligible
D	4	Tim Gleason	183	98	January 29, 1983	Clawson, Michigan	Windsor Spitfires (OHL)	Ottawa Senators
D	5	Matt Greene	191	101	May 13, 1983	Grand Ledge, Michigan	University of North Dakota	Edmonton Oilers
D	3	Matt Jones	183	98	August 8, 1983	Downers Grove, Illinois	University of North Dakota	Phoenix Coyotes
D	2	Mark Stuart	188	97	April 27, 1984	Rochester, Minnesota	Colorado College	2003 Draft eligible
D	7	Ryan Suter	185	88	January 21, 1985	Madison, Wisconsin	U.S. national under-18 team(NAHL)	2003 Draft eligible
D	19	Ryan Whitney	194	87	February 19, 1983	Scituate, Massachusetts	Boston University	Pittsburgh Penguins
D	20	James Wisniewski	180	88	February 21, 1984	Canton, Michigan	Plymouth Whalers (OHL)	Chicago Blackhawks
F	23	Dustin Brown	187	82	November 4, 1984	Ithaca, New York	Guelph Storm (OHL)	2003 Draft eligible
F	14	Gino Guyer	180	87	October 14, 1983	Coleraine, Minnesota	University of Minnesota	2003 Draft eligible
F	10	Dwight Helminen	179	84	June 22, 1983	Brighton, Michigan	University of Michigan	Edmonton Oilers
F	18	Chris Higgins	183	92	June 2, 1983	Smithtown, New York	Yale University	Montreal Canadiens
F	17	Ryan Kesler	188	92	August 31, 1984	Livonia, Michigan	Ohio State University	Vancouver Canucks
F	16	Brian McConnell	185	86	February 1, 1983	Norfolk, Massachusetts	Boston University	Calgary Flames
F	15	Greg Moore	185	95	March 26, 1984	Lisbon, Maine	University of Maine	2003 Draft eligible
F	21	Eric Nystrom	185	88	February 14, 1983	Syosset, New York	University of Michigan	Calgary Flames
F	12	Patrick O'Sullivan	180	86	February 1, 1985	Toronto, Ontario, Canada	Mississauga IceDogs (OHL)	2003 Draft eligible
F	11	Zach Parise	180	86	July 28, 1984	Prior Lake, Minnesota	University of North Dakota	2003 Draft eligible
F	22	Ryan Shannon	175	78	March 2, 1983	Darien, Connecticut	Boston College	Undrafted
F	24	Brett Sterling	170	84	April 24, 1984	Los Angeles, California	Colorado College	2003 Draft eligible
F	27	Barry Tallackson	193	95	April 14, 1983	Grafton, North Dakota	University of Minnesota	New Jersey Devils

=== 2004 World Junior ===
(won gold medal)

Position	Jersey #	Name	Height (cm)	Weight (kg)	Birthdate	Birthplace	2003–2004 team	NHL rights
G	29	Al Montoya	188	88	February 13, 1985	Glenview, Illinois	University of Michigan	2004 Draft Eligible
G	1	Dominic Vicari	178	82	October 30, 1984	Clinton Township, Michigan	Michigan State University	Undrafted
D	4	Matt Carle	184	93	September 25, 1984	Anchorage, Alaska	University of Denver	San Jose Sharks
D	5	Matt Hunwick	180	86	May 21, 1985	Warren, Michigan	University of Michigan	2004 Draft Eligible
D	10	Jeff Likens	180	81	August 28, 1985	Barrington, Illinois	University of Wisconsin	Undrafted
D	3	Corey Potter	188	83	January 5, 1984	Lansing, Michigan	Michigan State University	New York Rangers
D	6	Danny Richmond	183	88	August 1, 1984	Buffalo Grove, Illinois	London Knights (OHL)	Carolina Hurricanes
D	2	Mark Stuart	188	97	April 27, 1984	Rochester, Minnesota	Colorado College	Boston Bruins
D	7	Ryan Suter	185	88	January 21, 1985	Madison, Wisconsin	University of Wisconsin	Nashville Predators
D	20	James Wisniewski	180	88	February 21, 1984	Canton, Michigan	Plymouth Whalers (OHL)	Chicago Blackhawks
F	21	David Booth	183	96	November 24, 1984	Detroit, Michigan	Michigan State University	2004 Draft Eligible
F	16	Jake Dowell	183	92	March 4, 1985	Eau Claire, Wisconsin	University of Wisconsin	2004 Draft Eligible
F	9	Patrick Eaves	183	87	May 1, 1984	Calgary, Alberta, Canada	Boston College	Ottawa Senators
F	22	Dan Fritsche	188	90	July 13, 1985	Parma, Ohio	Sarnia Sting (OHL)	Columbus Blue Jackets
F	17	Ryan Kesler	188	92	August 31, 1984	Livonia, Michigan	Manitoba Moose (AHL)	Vancouver Canucks
F	15	Greg Moore	185	95	March 26, 1984	Lisbon, Maine	University of Maine	Calgary Flames
F	14	Brady Murray	175	82	August 17, 1984	Brandon, Manitoba, Canada	University of North Dakota	Los Angeles Kings
F	12	Patrick O'Sullivan	180	86	February 1, 1985	Toronto, Ontario, Canada	Mississauga IceDogs (OHL)	Minnesota Wild
F	11	Zach Parise	180	86	July 28, 1984	Prior Lake, Minnesota	University of North Dakota	New Jersey Devils
F	19	Drew Stafford	188	92	October 30, 1985	Milwaukee, Wisconsin	University of North Dakota	2004 Draft Eligible
F	24	Brett Sterling	170	84	April 24, 1984	Los Angeles, California	Colorado College	Atlanta Thrashers
F	27	Stephen Werner	185	96	August 8, 1984	Chevy Chase, Maryland	University of Massachusetts-Amherst	Washington Capitals

=== 2005 World Juniors ===
(finished 4th)

Position	Jersey #	Name	Height (cm)	Weight (kg)	Birthdate	Birthplace	2004–2005 team	NHL rights, if any
G	29	Al Montoya	188	88	February 13, 1985	Glenview, Illinois	Hartford Wolf Pack (AHL)	New York Rangers
G	1	Cory Schneider	188	91	March 18, 1986	Marblehead, Massachusetts	Boston College	Vancouver Canucks
D	6	Casey Borer	188	93	July 28, 1985	Minneapolis, Minnesota	St. Cloud State	Carolina Hurricanes
D	10	Alex Goligoski	178	80	July 30, 1985	Grand Rapids, Minnesota	University of Minnesota	Pittsburgh Penguins
D	18	Nate Hagemo	108	86	October 8, 1986	Edina, Minnesota	University of Minnesota	2005 Draft Eligible
D	22	Matt Hunwick	180	86	May 21, 1985	Warren, Michigan	University of Michigan	Boston Bruins
D	2	Brian Lee	188	93	March 26, 1987	Moorhead, Minnesota	University of North Dakota	2005 Draft Eligible
D	5	Jeff Likens	180	81	August 28, 1985	Barrington, Illinois	University of Wisconsin	Undrafted
D	7	Ryan Suter	185	88	January 21, 1985	Madison, Wisconsin	Milwaukee Admirals (AHL)	Nashville Predators
F	27	Chris Bourque	173	82	January 29, 1986	Boston, Massachusetts	Boston University	Washington Capitals
F	13	Mike Brown	180	91	June 24, 1985	Northbrook, Illinois	Manitoba Moose (AHL)	Vancouver Canucks
F	24	Ryan Callahan	180	84	March 21, 1985	Rochester, New York	Guelph Storm (OHL)	New York Rangers
F	16	Jake Dowell	183	92	March 4, 1985	Eau Claire, Wisconsin	University of Wisconsin	Chicago Blackhawks
F	9	Dan Fritsche	188	90	July 13, 1985	Parma, Ohio	London Knights (OHL)	Columbus Blue Jackets
F	11	T.J. Hensick	178	84	December 10, 1985	Howell, Michigan	University of Michigan	2005 Draft Eligible
F	26	Phil Kessel	180	82	October 2, 1987	Madison, Wisconsin	U.S. national under-18 team (NAHL)	2006 Draft Eligible
F	12	Patrick O'Sullivan	180	86	February 1, 1985	Toronto, Ontario, Canada	Mississauga IceDogs (OHL)	Minnesota Wild
F	8	Adam Pineault	185	91	May 23, 1986	Holyoke, Massachusetts	Moncton Wildcats (QMJHL)	Columbus Blue Jackets
F	21	Kevin Porter	180	82	March 12, 1986	Northville, Michigan	University of Michigan	Phoenix Coyotes
F	17	Rob Schremp	180	91	July 1, 1986	Fulton, New York	London Knights (OHL)	Edmonton Oilers
F	19	Drew Stafford	188	92	October 30, 1985	Milwaukee, Wisconsin	University of North Dakota	Buffalo Sabres
F	–	Shawn Weller	185	93	July 8, 1986	South Glens Falls, New York	Clarkson University	Atlanta Thrashers

=== 2006 World Juniors ===
(finished 4th)

Position	Jersey #	Name	Height (cm)	Weight (kg)	Birthdate	Birthplace	2005–2006 team	NHL rights, if any
G	30	Jeff Frazee	188	91	May 13, 1987	Edina, Minnesota	University of Minnesota	New Jersey Devils
G	1	Cory Schneider	188	91	March 18, 1986	Marblehead, Massachusetts	Boston College	Vancouver Canucks
D	4	Chris Butler	185	92	October 24, 1986	St. Louis, Missouri	University of Denver	Buffalo Sabres
D	2	Taylor Chorney	183	82	April 27, 1987	Thunder Bay, Ontario, Canada	University of North Dakota	Edmonton Oilers
D	6	Erik Johnson	193	107	March 21, 1988	Bloomington, Minnesota	University of Minnesota	2006 Draft Eligible
D	3	Jack Johnson	185	102	January 13, 1987	Indianapolis, Indiana	University of Michigan	Carolina Hurricanes
D	22	Brian Lee	188	93	March 26, 1987	Moorhead, Minnesota	University of North Dakota	Ottawa Senators
D	23	Mark Mitera	191	98	October 22, 1987	Royal Oak, Michigan	University of Michigan	2006 Draft Eligible
D	15	Matt Niskanen	185	86	December 6, 1986	Virginia, Minnesota	University of Minnesota-Duluth	Dallas Stars
F	27	Chris Bourque	173	82	January 29, 1986	Boston, Massachusetts	Hershey Bears (AHL)	Washington Capitals
F	10	Nate Davis	185	93	May 23, 1986	Rocky River, Ohio	Miami University(Ohio)	Chicago Blackhawks
F	26	Tom Fritsche	180	83	September 30, 1986	Parma, Ohio	Ohio State	Colorado Avalanche
F	20	Nathan Gerbe	165	73	July 26, 1987	Oxford, Michigan	Boston College	Buffalo Sabres
F	8	Phil Kessel	180	82	October 2, 1987	Madison, Wisconsin	Boston Bruins	–
F	24	Peter Mueller	188	93	April 14, 1988	Bloomington, Minnesota	Everett Silvertips (WHL)	2006 Draft Eligible
F	7	T. J. Oshie	180	79	December 23, 1986	Mount Vernon, Washington	University of North Dakota	St. Louis Blues
F	12	Geoff Paukovich	193	98	April 24, 1986	Englewood, Colorado	University of Denver	Edmonton Oilers
F	11	Kevin Porter	180	82	March 12, 1986	Northville, Michigan	University of Michigan	Phoenix Coyotes
F	9	Bobby Ryan	188	97	March 17, 1987	Cherry Hill, New Jersey	Owen Sound Attack (OHL)	Anaheim Ducks
F	17	Rob Schremp	180	91	July 1, 1986	Fulton, New York	London Knights (OHL)	Edmonton Oilers
F	21	Jack Skille	185	90	May 19, 1987	Madison, Wisconsin	University of Wisconsin	Chicago Blackhawks
F	16	Blake Wheeler	193	93	August 31, 1986	Plymouth, Minnesota	University of Minnesota	Phoenix Coyotes

=== 2007 World Juniors ===
(won bronze medal)

Position	Jersey #	Name	Height (cm)	Weight (kg)	Birthdate	Birthplace	Previous club/team	NHL rights, if any
G	30	Jeff Frazee	188	91	May 13, 1987	Edina, Minnesota	University of Minnesota	New Jersey Devils
G	37	Jeff Zatkoff	91	77	June 9, 1987	Detroit, Michigan	Miami University (Ohio)	Los Angeles Kings
D	4	Taylor Chorney	183	82	April 27, 1987	Thunder Bay, Ontario, Canada	University of North Dakota	Edmonton Oilers
D	6	Erik Johnson	93	107	March 21, 1988	Bloomington, Minnesota	University of Minnesota	St. Louis Blues
D	3	Jack Johnson	185	102	January 13, 1987	Indianapolis, Indiana	University of Michigan	Los Angeles Kings
D	2	Kyle Lawson	180	89	January 11, 1987	New Hudson, Michigan	University of Notre Dame	Carolina Hurricanes
D	22	Brian Lee	188	93	March 26, 1987	Moorhead, Minnesota	University of North Dakota	Ottawa Senators
D	17	Jamie McBain	188	89	February 25, 1988	Edina, Minnesota	University of Wisconsin	Carolina Hurricanes
D	23	Sean Zimmerman	188	91	May 24, 1987	Denver, Colorado	Spokane Chiefs (WHL)	New Jersey Devils
F	18	Justin Abdelkader	185	98	February 25, 1987	Muskegon, Michigan	Michigan State University	Detroit Red Wings
F	16	Mike Carman	183	84	April 14, 1988	Apple Valley, Minnesota	University of Minnesota	Colorado Avalanche
F	11	Jim Fraser	180	84	January 16, 1987	Port Huron, Michigan	Harvard University	Undrafted
F	5	Blake Geoffrion	188	89	February 3, 1988	Plantation, Florida	University of Wisconsin	Nashville Predators
F	9	Nathan Gerbe	165	73	July 26, 1987	Oxford, Michigan	Boston College	Buffalo Sabres
F	27	Patrick Kane	178	81	November 19, 1988	Buffalo, New York	London Knights (OHL)	2007 Draft Eligible
F	24	Trevor Lewis	185	87	January 8, 1987	Salt Lake City, Utah	Owen Sound Attack (OHL)	Los Angeles Kings
F	8	Kyle Okposo	185	91	April 16, 1988	St. Paul, Minnesota	University of Minnesota	New York Islanders
F	88	Peter Mueller	188	93	April 14, 1988	Bloomington, Minnesota	Everett Silvertips (WHL)	Phoenix Coyotes
F	20	Jack Skille	185	90	May 19, 1987	Madison, Wisconsin	University of Wisconsin	Chicago Blackhawks
F	19	Ryan Stoa	191	97	April 13, 1987	Bloomington, Minnesota	University of Minnesota	Colorado Avalanche
F	21	Bill Sweatt	183	82	September 28, 1988	Elburn, Illinois	Colorado College	2007 Draft Eligible
F	12	James van Riemsdyk	191	96	May 4, 1989	Middletown, New Jersey	USNTDP (NAHL)	2007 Draft Eligible

=== 2008 World Juniors ===
(finished 4th)

Position	Jersey #	Name	Height (cm)	Weight (kg)	Birthdate	Birthplace	2007–2008 team	NHL rights, if any
G	34	Joe Palmer	185	93	February 19, 1988	Yorkville, New York	Ohio State Buckeyes	Chicago Blackhawks
G	30	Jeremy Smith	183	86	April 13, 1989	Dearborn, Michigan	Plymouth Whalers (OHL)	Nashville Predators
D	24	Jonathon Blum	185	84	January 30, 1989	Santa Margarita, California	Vancouver Giants (WHL)	Nashville Predators
D	28	Ian Cole	185	99	February 21, 1989	Ann Arbor, Michigan	University of Notre Dame	St. Louis Blues
D	27	Cade Fairchild	178	84	January 15, 1989	Duluth, Minnesota	University of Minnesota	St. Louis Blues
D	4	Jamie McBain	188	89	February 25, 1988	Edina, Minnesota	University of Wisconsin	Carolina Hurricanes
D	23	Kevin Montgomery	185	84	April 4, 1988	Rochester, New York	London Knights (OHL)	Colorado Avalanche
D	20	Robert Sanguinetti	191	86	February 29, 1988	Trenton, New Jersey	Brampton Battalion (OHL)	New York Rangers
D	7	Brian Strait	185	91	January 4, 1988	Waltham, Massachusetts	Boston University	Pittsburgh Penguins
D	24	Chris Summers	188	84	February 5, 1988	Ann Arbor, Michigan	University of Michigan	Phoenix Coyotes
F	19	Mike Carman	183	84	April 14, 1988	Apple Valley, Minnesota	University of Minnesota	Colorado Avalanche
F	22	Ryan Flynn	191	98	March 22, 1988	St. Paul, Minnesota	University of Minnesota	Nashville Predators
F	5	Blake Geoffrion	188	89	February 3, 1988	Plantation, Florida	University of Wisconsin	Nashville Predators
F	9	Kyle Okposo	185	91	April 16, 1988	St. Paul, Minnesota	University of Minnesota	New York Islanders
F	17	Max Pacioretty	185	92	November 20, 1988	New Canaan, Connecticut	University of Michigan	Montreal Canadiens
F	10	Rhett Rakhshani	178	82	March 6, 1988	Orange, California	University of Denver	New York Islanders
F	15	Tyler Ruegsegger	180	89	January 19, 1988	Denver, Colorado	University of Denver	Toronto Maple Leafs
F	11	Matt Rust	175	87	March 23, 1989	Bloomfield Hills, Michigan	University of Michigan	Florida Panthers
F	29	Jordan Schroeder	173	79	September 29, 1990	Prior Lake, Minnesota	USNTDP (NAHL)	2009 Draft Eligible
F	21	Bill Sweatt	183	82	September 28, 1988	Elburn, Illinois	Colorado College	Chicago Blackhawks
F	12	James van Riemsdyk	191	96	May 4, 1989	Middletown, New Jersey	University of New Hampshire	Philadelphia Flyers
F	33	Colin Wilson	185	98	October 20, 1989	Greenwich, Connecticut	Boston University	2008 Draft Eligible

=== 2009 World Juniors ===
(finished 5th)

Position	Jersey number	Name	Height (cm)	Weight (kg)	Birthdate	Birthplace	2008-09 team	NHL rights, if any
G	30	Thomas McCollum	188	93	7 December 1989	(New York (state)) Sanborn, New York	(Canada) Guelph Storm	(United States) Detroit Red Wings
G	1	Josh Unice	183	79	24 June 1989	Holland, Ohio	(Canada) Kitchener Rangers	(United States) Chicago Blackhawks
D	24	Jonathon Blum	185	84	30 January 1989	Rancho Santa Margarita, California	(Canada) Vancouver Giants	(United States) Nashville Predators
D	28	Ian Cole	185	99	21 February 1989	Ann Arbor, Michigan	(United States) University of Notre Dame	(United States) St. Louis Blues
D	4	Cade Fairchild	178	84	15 January 1989	Duluth, Minnesota	(United States) University of Minnesota	(United States) St. Louis Blues
D	20	Blake Kessel	188	92	13 April 1989	Madison, Wisconsin	(United States) University of New Hampshire	(United States) New York Islanders
D	17	Ryan McDonagh	185	94	13 June 1989	Arden Hills, Minnesota	(United States) University of Wisconsin-Madison	(United States) New York Rangers
D	5	Teddy Ruth	183	93	14 February 1989	Naperville, Illinois	(United States) University of Notre Dame	(United States) Columbus Blue Jackets
D	8	Kevin Shattenkirk	180	87	29 January 1989	(New York (state)) New Rochelle, New York	(United States) Boston University	(United States) Colorado Avalanche
F	27	Drayson Bowman	185	88	8 March 1989	Littleton, Colorado	(United States) Spokane Chiefs	(United States) Carolina Hurricanes
F	12	Jimmy Hayes	191	93	21 November 1989	Dorchester, Boston, Massachusetts	(United States) Boston College	(Canada) Toronto Maple Leafs
F	11	Mike Hoeffel	191	88	9 April 1989	North Oaks, Minnesota	(United States) University of Minnesota	(United States) New Jersey Devils
F	10	Tyler Johnson	175	79	29 July 1990	(Washington (state)) Spokane, Washington	(United States) Spokane Chiefs	None
F	18	Danny Kristo	180	82	18 June 1990	Eden Prairie, Minnesota	(United States) Omaha Lancers	(Canada) Montreal Canadiens
F	15	Jim O'Brien	188	86	29 January 1989	Maplewood, Minnesota	(United States) Seattle Thunderbirds	(Canada) Ottawa Senators
F	7	Aaron Palushaj	183	84	7 September 1989	Northville, Michigan	(United States) University of Michigan	(United States) St. Louis Blues
F	9	Matt Rust	178	88	23 March 1989	Bloomfield Hills, Michigan	(United States) University of Michigan	(United States) Florida Panthers
F	19	Jordan Schroeder	175	83	29 September 1990	Prior Lake, Minnesota	(United States) University of Minnesota	None
F	25	Eric Tangradi	191	97	10 February 1989	Philadelphia, Pennsylvania	(Canada) Belleville Bulls	(United States) Anaheim Ducks
F	21	James van Riemsdyk	191	95	4 May 1989	Middletown, New Jersey	(United States) University of New Hampshire	(United States) Philadelphia Flyers
F	14	Mitch Wahl	183	86	22 January 1990	Seal Beach, California	(United States) Spokane Chiefs	(Canada) Calgary Flames
F	33	Colin Wilson	185	97	20 October 1989	Greenwich, Connecticut	(United States) Boston University	(United States) Nashville Predators

=== 2010 World Juniors ===
- Won gold medal.

Position	Jersey number	Name	Height (cm)	Weight (kg)	Birthdate	Birthplace	2009-10 team	NHL rights, if any
G	1	Jack Campbell	185	85	9 January 1992	Port Huron, Michigan	US National Under-18 Team (USNTDP)	2010 Draft eligible
G	30	Mike Lee	183	88	5 October 1990	Roseau, Minnesota	St. Cloud State University	Phoenix Coyotes
D	11	John Carlson	190	95	10 January 1990	Colonia, New Jersey	Hershey Bears	Washington Capitals
D	4	Matt Donovan	183	86	9 May 1990	Edmond, Oklahoma	University of Denver	New York Islanders
D	24	Cam Fowler	188	90	5 December 1991	Farmington Hills, Michigan	Windsor Spitfires	2010 Draft eligible
D	28	Jake Gardiner	188	82	4 July 1990	Minnetonka, Minnesota	University of Wisconsin	Anaheim Ducks
D	18	Brian Lashoff	190	93	16 July 1990	Albany, New York	Kingston Frontenacs	Detroit Red Wings
D	2	John Ramage	183	88	7 February 1991	St. Louis, Missouri	University of Wisconsin	2010 Draft eligible
D	5	David Warsofsky	175	77	30 May 1990	Marshfield, Massachusetts	Boston University	St. Louis Blues
F	17	Ryan Bourque	173	75	3 January 1991	Boxford, Massachusetts	Quebec Remparts	New York Rangers
F	29	Jerry D'Amigo	180	91	19 February 1991	Binghamton, New York	Rensselaer Polytechnic Institute	Toronto Maple Leafs
F	22	AJ Jenks	188	93	27 June 1990	Wolverine Lake, Michigan	Plymouth Whalers	Florida Panthers
F	10	Tyler Johnson	175	77	29 July 1990	Spokane, Washington	Spokane Chiefs	None
F	20	Chris Kreider	188	93	30 April 1991	Boxford, Massachusetts	Boston College	New York Rangers
F	8	Danny Kristo	183	83	18 June 1990	Eden Prairie, Minnesota	University of North Dakota	Montreal Canadiens
F	9	Philip McRae	190	90	15 March 1990	Chesterfield, Missouri	London Knights	St. Louis Blues
F	26	Jeremy Morin	185	88	16 April 1991	Auburn, New York	Kitchener Rangers	Atlanta Thrashers
F	23	Kyle Palmieri	180	88	1 February 1991	Montvale, New Jersey	University of Notre Dame	Anaheim Ducks
F	19	Jordan Schroeder	175	85	29 September 1990	Prior Lake, Minnesota	University of Minnesota	Vancouver Canucks
F	21	Derek Stepan	183	82	18 June 1990	Hastings, Minnesota	University of Wisconsin	New York Rangers
F	14	Luke Walker	185	80	19 February 1990	Portland, Oregon	Portland Winterhawks	None
F	16	Jason Zucker	178	76	16 January 1992	Las Vegas, Nevada	US National Under-18 Team (USNTDP)	2010 Draft eligible

=== 2011 World Juniors ===
- Won Bronze medal

Position	Jersey #	Name	Height	Weight	Birthdate	Birthplace	2010–11 team	NHL rights, if any
G	1	Jack Campbell	6'2"	182	January 9, 1992	Port Huron, Michigan	Windsor Spitfires (OHL)	Dallas Stars
G	29	Andy Iles	5'10"	85	January 30, 1992	Ithaca, New York	Cornell University (ECACH)	None
D	4	Brian Dumoulin	6'4"	210	September 9, 1991	Biddeford, Maine	Boston College (HE)	Carolina Hurricanes
D	25	Justin Faulk	5'11"	200	March 20, 1992	South St. Paul, Minnesota	University of Minnesota Duluth(WCHA)	Carolina Hurricanes
D	7	Derek Forbort	6'5"	200	March 4, 1992	Duluth, Minnesota	University of North Dakota (WCHA)	Los Angeles Kings
D	6	Nick Leddy	5'11"	190	March 20, 1991	Eden Prairie, Minnesota	Rockford IceHogs (AHL)	Chicago Blackhawks
D	12	Jon Merrill	6'3"	209	February 2, 1992	Brighton, Michigan	University of Michigan (CCHA)	New Jersey Devils
D	5	John Ramage	6'0"	201	February 7, 1991	Chesterfield, Missouri	University of Wisconsin (WCHA)	Calgary Flames
D	18	Patrick Wey	6'2"	205	March 21, 1991	Pittsburgh, Pennsylvania	Boston College (HE)	Washington Capitals
F	27	Nick Bjugstad	6'4"	204	July 17, 1992	Blaine, Minnesota	University of Minnesota(WCHA)	Florida Panthers
F	17	Ryan Bourque	5'9"	164	January 3, 1991	Boxford, Massachusetts	Quebec Remparts (QMJHL)	New York Rangers
F	10	Chris Brown	6'2"	194	February 3, 1991	Flower Mound, Texas	University of Michigan (CCHA)	Phoenix Coyotes
F	24	Mitch Callahan	5'11"	175	August 17, 1991	Whittier, California	Kelowna Rockets (WHL)	Detroit Red Wings
F	3	Charlie Coyle	6'2"	207	March 2, 1992	East Weymouth, Massachusetts	Boston University (HE)	San Jose Sharks
F	9	Jerry D'Amigo	5'11"	213	February 19, 1991	Binghamton, New York	Toronto Marlies (AHL)	Toronto Maple Leafs
F	26	Emerson Etem	6'1"	197	June 16, 1992	Long Beach, California	Medicine Hat Tigers (WHL)	Anaheim Ducks
F	19	Chris Kreider	6'2"	214	April 30, 1991	Boxford, Massachusetts	Boston College (HE)	New York Rangers
F	11	Jeremy Morin	6'1"	189	April 16, 1991	Auburn, New York	Rockford IceHogs (AHL)	Chicago Blackhawks
F	8	Brock Nelson	6'3"	195	October 15, 1991	Minneapolis, Minnesota	University of North Dakota (WCHA)	New York Islanders
F	23	Kyle Palmieri	5'10"	194	February 1, 1991	Montvale, New Jersey	Syracuse Crunch (AHL)	Anaheim Ducks
F	15	Drew Shore	6'2"	200	January 29, 1991	Denver, Colorado	University of Denver (WCHA)	Florida Panthers
F	16	Jason Zucker	5'11"	180	January 16, 1992	Las Vegas, Nevada	University of Denver (WCHA)	Minnesota Wild

=== 2012 World Juniors ===
- Finished 7th

Position	Jersey #	Name	Height	Weight	Birthdate	Hometown	2011–12 team	NHL rights, if any
G	1	Jack Campbell	6'2"	183	January 9, 1992	Port Huron, Michigan	Sault Ste. Marie Greyhounds (OHL)	Dallas Stars
G	35	John Gibson	6'3"	201	July 14, 1993	Pittsburgh, Pennsylvania	Kitchener Rangers (OHL)	Anaheim Ducks
D	4	Derek Forbort	6'5"	201	March 4, 1992	Duluth, Minnesota	University of North Dakota (WCHA)	Los Angeles Kings
D	5	Adam Clendening	5'11"	190	October 26, 1992	Niagara Falls, New York	Boston University(HEA)	Chicago Blackhawks
D	8	Jacob Trouba	6'2"	192	February 26, 1994	Rochester, Michigan	National Team Development Program (USHL)	2012 Draft eligible
D	12	Kevin Gravel	6'4"	190	March 6, 1992	Kingsford, Michigan	St. Cloud State University (WCHA)	Los Angeles Kings
D	15	Jon Merrill	6'3"	209	February 2, 1992	Brighton, Michigan	University of Michigan (CCHA)	New Jersey Devils
D	24	Jarred Tinordi	6'7"	216	February 20, 1992	Millersville, Maryland	London Knights (OHL)	Montreal Canadiens
D	28	Stephen Johns	6'4"	220	April 18, 1992	Wampum, Pennsylvania	University of Notre Dame (CCHA)	Chicago Blackhawks
F	2	Austin Czarnik	5'8"	152	December 12, 1992	Washington, Michigan	Miami University (CCHA)	None
F	3	Charlie Coyle	6'2"	207	March 2, 1992	East Weymouth, Massachusetts	Boston University (HEA)	New York Rangers
F	10	Emerson Etem	6'1"	196	June 16, 1992	Long Beach, California	Medicine Hat Tigers (WHL)	Anaheim Ducks
F	11	J. T. Miller	6'1"	194	March 14, 1993	East Palestine, Ohio	Plymouth Whalers (OHL)	New York Rangers
F	14	Bill Arnold	6'0"	216	May 13, 1992	Needham, Massachusetts	Boston College (HEA)	Calgary Flames
F	16	Jason Zucker	5'11"	181	January 16, 1992	Las Vegas, Nevada	University of Denver (WCHA)	Minnesota Wild
F	19	T. J. Tynan	5'8"	170	February 25, 1992	Orland Park, Illinois	University of Notre Dame (CCHA)	Columbus Blue Jackets
F	20	Kyle Rau	5'8"	172	October 24, 1992	Eden Prairie, Minnesota	University of Minnesota (WCHA)	Florida Panthers
F	21	Josh Archibald	5'10"	170	October 6, 1992	Brainerd, Minnesota	University of Nebraska Omaha (WCHA)	Pittsburgh Penguins
F	22	Brandon Saad	6'2"	205	October 27, 1992	Gibsonia, Pennsylvania	Saginaw Spirit (OHL)	Chicago Blackhawks
F	23	Connor Brickley	6'1"	194	February 25, 1992	Everett, Massachusetts	University of Vermont (HEA)	Florida Panthers
F	26	Austin Watson	6'3"	194	January 13, 1992	Ann Arbor, Michigan	Peterborough Petes (OHL)	Nashville Predators
F	27	Nick Bjugstad	6'4"	205	July 17, 1992	Blaine, Minnesota	University of Minnesota (WCHA)	Florida Panthers

=== 2013 World Juniors ===
- won gold medal

Position	Jersey #	Name	Height	Weight	Birthdate	Hometown	2012–13 team	NHL rights, if any
G	29	Garret Sparks	6'2"	211	June 28, 1993	Elmhurst, Illinois	Guelph Storm (OHL)	Toronto Maple Leafs
G	30	Jon Gillies	6'5"	230	January 22, 1994	South Portland, Maine	Providence College (HEA)	Calgary Flames
G	35	John Gibson	6'3"	222	July 14, 1993	Pittsburgh, Pennsylvania	Kitchener Rangers (OHL)	Anaheim Ducks
D	3	Seth Jones	6'4"	205	October 3, 1994	Plano, Texas	Portland Winterhawks (WHL)	2013 Draft eligible
D	5	Connor Murphy	6'4"	205	March 26, 1993	Dublin, Ohio	Sarnia Sting (OHL)	Phoenix Coyotes
D	6	Mike Reilly	6'1"	167	July 13, 1993	Chanhassen, Minnesota	University of Minnesota (WCHA)	Columbus Blue Jackets
D	8	Jacob Trouba	6'2"	198	February 26, 1994	Rochester, Michigan	University of Michigan (CCHA)	Winnipeg Jets
D	14	Shayne Gostisbehere	5'11"	167	April 20, 1993	Margate, Florida	Union College (ECAC)	Philadelphia Flyers
D	19	Jake McCabe	6'1"	207	October 12, 1993	Eau Claire, Wisconsin	University of Wisconsin–Madison (WCHA)	Montreal Canadiens
D	27	Patrick Sieloff	6'1"	199	May 15, 1994	Ann Arbor, Michigan	Windsor Spitfires (OHL)	Calgary Flames
F	7	Sean Kuraly	6'2"	199	January 20, 1993	Dublin, Ohio	Miami University (CCHA)	San Jose Sharks
F	10	J. T. Miller	6'2"	212	March 14, 1993	East Palestine, Ohio	Connecticut Whale (AHL)	New York Rangers
F	12	Mario Lucia	6'2"	193	August 25, 1993	Plymouth, Minnesota	University of Notre Dame (CCHA)	Minnesota Wild
F	13	John Gaudreau	5'9"	150	August 13, 1993	Carneys Point, New Jersey	Boston College (HEA)	Calgary Flames
F	15	Alex Galchenyuk	6'1"	197	February 12, 1994	Milwaukee, Wisconsin	Sarnia Sting (OHL)	Montreal Canadiens
F	16	Riley Barber	5'11"	194	February 7, 1994	Livonia, Michigan	Miami University (CCHA)	Washington Capitals
F	18	Cole Bardreau	5'10"	181	July 22, 1993	Fairport, New York	Cornell University (ECAC)	None
F	20	Blake Pietila	6'0"	195	February 20, 1993	Brighton, Michigan	Michigan Technological University (WCHA)	New Jersey Devils
F	21	Ryan Hartman	6'0"	187	September 20, 1994	West Dundee, Illinois	Plymouth Whalers (OHL)	2013 Draft eligible
F	22	Tyler Biggs	6'2"	223	April 30, 1993	Loveland, Ohio	Oshawa Generals (OHL)	Toronto Maple Leafs
F	23	Rocco Grimaldi	5'6"	165	February 8, 1993	Rossmoor, California	University of North Dakota (WCHA)	Florida Panthers
F	25	Vince Trocheck	5'10"	186	July 11, 1993	Pittsburgh, Pennsylvania	Saginaw Spirit (OHL)	Florida Panthers
F	26	Jim Vesey	6'2"	200	May 26, 1993	North Reading, Massachusetts	Harvard University (ECAC)	Nashville Predators

=== 2014 World Juniors ===
- Finished 5th

Position	Jersey #	Name	Height	Weight	Birthdate	Hometown	2013–14 team	NHL rights, if any
G	29	Anthony Stolarz	6'6"	220	January 20, 1994	Edison, New Jersey	London Knights (OHL)	Philadelphia Flyers
G	32	Jon Gillies	6'5"	215	January 22, 1994	South Portland, Maine	Providence College (HEA)	Calgary Flames
G	35	Thatcher Demko	6'3"	190	December 8, 1995	San Diego, California	Boston College (HEA)	2014 Draft eligible
D	2	Brady Skjei	6'2"	197	March 26, 1994	Lakeville, Minnesota	University of Minnesota (B1G)	New York Rangers
D	3	Ian McCoshen	6'2"	207	August 5, 1995	Hudson, Wisconsin	Boston College (HEA)	Florida Panthers
D	4	Will Butcher	5'11"	175	January 6, 1995	Sun Prairie, Wisconsin	University of Denver (NCHC)	Colorado Avalanche
D	6	Jaccob Slavin	6'3"	195	May 1, 1994	Erie, Colorado	Colorado College (NCHC)	Carolina Hurricanes
D	7	Matt Grzelcyk (A)	5'9"	175	January 5, 1994	Charlestown, Massachusetts	Boston University (HEA)	Boston Bruins
D	16	Steven Santini	6'2"	207	March 7, 1995	Mahopac, New York	Boston College (HEA)	New Jersey Devils
D	28	Connor Carrick	5'11"	190	April 13, 1994	Orland Park, Illinois	Hershey Bears (AHL)	Washington Capitals
F	9	Andrew Copp (A)	6'1"	205	July 8, 1994	Ann Arbor, Michigan	University of Michigan (B1G)	Winnipeg Jets
F	10	Danny O'Regan	5'10"	176	January 30, 1994	Needham, Massachusetts	Boston University (HEA)	San Jose Sharks
F	11	Riley Barber (C)	5'11"	185	February 7, 1994	Pittsburgh, Pennsylvania	Miami University (NCHC)	Washington Capitals
F	13	Vince Hinostroza	5'9"	170	April 3, 1994	Bartlett, Illinois	University of Notre Dame (HEA)	Chicago Blackhawks
F	14	Thomas Di Pauli	5'11"	185	April 29, 1994	Woodridge, Illinois	University of Notre Dame (HEA)	Washington Capitals
F	15	Jack Eichel	6'1"	191	October 28, 1996	North Chelmsford, Massachusetts	National Team Development Program (USHL)	2015 Draft eligible
F	16	Nic Kerdiles	6'2"	196	January 11, 1994	Irvine, California	University of Wisconsin–Madison (B1G)	Anaheim Ducks
F	19	Adam Erne	6'0"	210	April 20, 1995	New Haven, Connecticut	Quebec Remparts (QMJHL)	Tampa Bay Lightning
F	21	Ryan Hartman	5'11"	190	September 20, 1994	West Dundee, Illinois	Plymouth Whalers (OHL)	Chicago Blackhawks
F	22	Hudson Fasching	6'2"	200	July 28, 1995	Burnsville, Minnesota	University of Minnesota (B1G)	Los Angeles Kings
F	23	Stefan Matteau	6'1"	215	February 23, 1994	Chicago, Illinois	Albany Devils (AHL)	New Jersey Devils
F	25	Quentin Shore	6'1"	185	May 25, 1994	Denver, Colorado	University of Denver (NCHC)	Ottawa Senators
F	26	Zach Stepan	5'11"	175	January 6, 1994	Hastings, Minnesota	Minnesota State University, Mankato (WCHA)	Nashville Predators

=== 2015 World Juniors ===
- Finished 5th

Position	Jersey #	Name	Height	Weight	Birthdate	Hometown	2014–15 team	NHL rights, if any
G	29	Brandon Halverson	6'4"	190	March 29, 1996	Traverse City, Michigan	Sault Ste. Marie Greyhounds (OHL)	New York Rangers
G	30	Thatcher Demko	6'3"	192	December 8, 1995	San Diego, California	Boston College (HEA)	Vancouver Canucks
G	31	Alex Nedeljkovic	6'0"	192	January 7, 1996	Parma, Ohio	Plymouth Whalers (OHL)	Carolina Hurricanes
D	2	Noah Hanifin	6'3"	205	January 25, 1997	Norwood, Massachusetts	Boston College (HEA)	2015 Draft eligible
D	3	Ian McCoshen	6'3"	206	August 5, 1995	Hudson, Wisconsin	Boston College (HEA)	Florida Panthers
D	4	Will Butcher (A)	5'10"	200	January 6, 1995	Sun Prairie, Wisconsin	University of Denver (NCHC)	Colorado Avalanche
D	6	Ryan Collins	6'4"	204	May 6, 1996	Bloomington, Minnesota	University of Minnesota (B1G)	Columbus Blue Jackets
D	23	Zach Werenski	6'2"	214	July 19, 1997	Grosse Pointe Woods, Michigan	University of Michigan (B1G)	2015 Draft eligible
D	24	Tony DeAngelo	5'11"	177	October 24, 1995	Philadelphia, Pennsylvania	Sarnia Sting (OHL)	Tampa Bay Lightning
D	26	Brandon Carlo	6'5"	195	November 26, 1996	Colorado Springs, Colorado	Tri-City Americans (WHL)	2015 Draft eligible
F	7	J. T. Compher	5'11"	185	April 8, 1995	Northbrook, Illinois	University of Michigan (B1G)	Buffalo Sabres
F	8	Nick Schmaltz	6'0"	172	February 23, 1996	Verona, Wisconsin	University of North Dakota (NCHC)	Chicago Blackhawks
F	9	Jack Eichel (C)	6'1"	191	October 28, 1996	North Chelmsford, Massachusetts	Boston University (HEA)	2015 Draft eligible
F	10	Anthony Louis	5'7"	160	February 10, 1995	Winfield, Illinois	Miami University (NCHC)	Chicago Blackhawks
F	13	Miles Wood	6'1"	195	September 13, 1995	Buffalo, New York	Noble & Greenough School (NEPSAC)	New Jersey Devils
F	13	Sonny Milano	5'11"	185	May 12, 1996	Massapequa, New York	Plymouth Whalers (OHL)	Columbus Blue Jackets
F	14	Tyler Motte	5'10"	185	March 10, 1995	St. Clair, Michigan	University of Michigan (B1G)	Chicago Blackhawks
F	15	John Hayden (A)	6'3"	210	February 14, 1995	Greenwich, Connecticut	Yale University (ECAC)	Chicago Blackhawks
F	17	Alex Tuch	6'3"	220	May 10, 1996	Baldwinsville, New York	Boston College (HEA)	Minnesota Wild
F	18	Chase De Leo	5'10"	175	October 25, 1995	La Mirada, California	Portland Winterhawks (WHL)	Winnipeg Jets
F	21	Dylan Larkin	6'0"	192	July 30, 1996	Waterford, Michigan	University of Michigan (B1G)	Detroit Red Wings
F	22	Hudson Fasching	6'2"	188	July 28, 1995	Burnsville, Minnesota	University of Minnesota (B1G)	Buffalo Sabres
F	34	Auston Matthews	6'0"	199	September 17, 1997	Scottsdale, Arizona	National Team Development Program (USHL)	2016 Draft eligible

=== 2016 World Juniors ===
- Won bronze medal

Position	Jersey #	Name	Height	Weight	Birthdate	Hometown	2015–16 team	NHL rights, if any
G	31	Alex Nedeljkovic	6'0"	190	January 7, 1996	Parma, Ohio	Niagara IceDogs (OHL)	Carolina Hurricanes
G	36	Brandon Halverson	6'4"	179	March 29, 1996	Traverse City, Michigan	Sault Ste. Marie Greyhounds (OHL)	New York Rangers
D	4	Chad Krys	5'11"	183	April 10, 1998	Ridgefield, Connecticut	National Team Development Program (USHL)	2016 Draft eligible
D	5	Brandon Fortunato	5'10"	148	June 7, 1996	Albertson, New York	Boston University (HEA)	None
D	8	Louie Belpedio (A)	5'10"	194	May 14, 1996	Skokie, Illinois	Miami University (NCHC)	Minnesota Wild
D	13	Zach Werenski (C)	6'2"	214	July 19, 1997	Grosse Pointe Woods, Michigan	University of Michigan (B1G)	Columbus Blue Jackets
D	20	Will Borgen	6'2"	195	December 19, 1996	Moorhead, Minnesota	St. Cloud State University (NCHC)	Buffalo Sabres
D	25	Charlie McAvoy	6'0"	205	December 21, 1997	Long Beach, New York	Boston University (HEA)	2016 Draft eligible
D	26	Brandon Carlo	6'5"	195	November 26, 1996	Colorado Springs, Colorado	Tri-City Americans (WHL)	Boston Bruins
F	7	Matthew Tkachuk	6'1"	188	December 11, 1997	St. Louis, Missouri	London Knights (OHL)	2016 Draft eligible
F	9	Nick Schmaltz	6'0"	172	February 23, 1996	Verona, Wisconsin	University of North Dakota (NCHC)	Chicago Blackhawks
F	10	Anders Bjork	5'11"	183	August 5, 1996	Mequon, Wisconsin	University of Notre Dame (HEA)	Boston Bruins
F	11	Christian Dvorak	6'0"	187	February 2, 1996	Palos, Illinois	London Knights (OHL)	Arizona Coyotes
F	12	Alex DeBrincat	5'7"	161	December 18, 1997	Farmington Hills, Michigan	Erie Otters (OHL)	2016 Draft eligible
F	14	Scott Eansor	5'8"	168	January 3, 1996	Englewood, Colorado	Seattle Thunderbirds (WHL)	None
F	17	Ryan MacInnis	6'4"	185	February 14, 1996	St. Louis, Missouri	Kitchener Rangers (OHL)	Arizona Coyotes
F	18	Colin White (A)	6'0"	183	January 30, 1997	Hanover, Massachusetts	Boston College (HEA)	Ottawa Senators
F	19	Ryan Donato	6'1"	181	April 9, 1996	Scituate, Massachusetts	Harvard University (ECAC)	Boston Bruins
F	21	Ryan Hitchcock	5'10"	170	March 30, 1996	Manhasset, New York	Yale University (ECAC)	None
F	23	Brock Boeser	6'0"	192	February 25, 1997	Burnsville, Minnesota	University of North Dakota (NCHC)	Vancouver Canucks
F	28	Sonny Milano	5'11"	185	May 12, 1996	Massapequa, New York	Lake Erie Monsters (AHL)	Columbus Blue Jackets
F	34	Auston Matthews (A)	6'0"	199	September 17, 1997	Scottsdale, Arizona	ZSC Lions (NLA)	2016 Draft eligible

=== 2017 World Juniors ===
- Won gold medal

Position	Jersey #	Name	Height	Weight	Birthdate	Hometown	2016–17 Team	NHL rights, if any
G	1	Tyler Parsons	6'0"	186	September 18, 1997	Chesterfield, Michigan	London Knights (OHL)	Calgary Flames
G	30	Jake Oettinger	6'4"	210	December 18, 1998	Lakeville, Minnesota	Boston University (HEA)	2017 Draft eligible
G	31	Joseph Woll	6'3"	202	July 12, 1998	St. Louis, Missouri	Boston College (HEA)	Toronto Maple Leafs
D	2	Ryan Lindgren	6'0"	208	February 11, 1998	Minneapolis, Minnesota	University of Minnesota (Big Ten)	Boston Bruins
D	3	Jack Ahcan	5'7"	184	May 18, 1997	Savage, Minnesota	St. Cloud State University (NCHC)	Undrafted
D	4	Caleb Jones	6'1"	194	June 6, 1997	Frisco, Texas	Portland Winterhawks (WHL)	Edmonton Oilers
D	6	Casey Fitzgerald	5'11"	187	February 25, 1997	North Reading, Massachusetts	Boston College (HEA)	Buffalo Sabres
D	8	Adam Fox	5'10"	187	February 17, 1998	Jericho, New York	Harvard University (ECAC)	Calgary Flames
D	25	Charlie McAvoy (A)	6'0"	206	December 21, 1997	Long Beach, New York	Boston University (HEA)	Boston Bruins
D	33	Joe Cecconi	6'2"	222	May 23, 1997	Youngstown, New York	University of Michigan (Big Ten)	Dallas Stars
F	9	Luke Kunin (C)	5'11"	196	December 4, 1997	Chesterfield, Missouri	University of Wisconsin (Big Ten)	Minnesota Wild
F	10	Tanner Laczynski	6'0"	191	June 1, 1997	Shorewood, Illinois	Ohio State University (Big Ten)	Philadelphia Flyers
F	11	Patrick Harper	5'9"	160	July 29, 1998	New Canaan, Connecticut	Boston University (HEA)	Nashville Predators
F	12	Jordan Greenway	6'5"	230	February 16, 1997	Canton, New York	Boston University (HEA)	Minnesota Wild
F	13	Joey Anderson	5'11"	200	June 19, 1998	Roseville, Minnesota	University of Minnesota Duluth (NCHC)	New Jersey Devils
F	14	Erik Foley	6'0"	197	June 30, 1997	Mansfield, Massachusetts	Providence College (HEA)	Winnipeg Jets
F	17	Jeremy Bracco	5'10"	180	March 17, 1997	Freeport, New York	Windsor Spitfires (OHL)	Toronto Maple Leafs
F	18	Colin White (A)	6'0"	183	January 30, 1997	Hanover, Massachusetts	Boston College (HEA)	Ottawa Senators
F	19	Clayton Keller	5'10"	172	July 29, 1998	Swansea, Illinois	Boston University (HEA)	Arizona Coyotes
F	20	Troy Terry	6'0"	166	September 10, 1997	Highlands Ranch, Colorado	University of Denver (NCHC)	Anaheim Ducks
F	23	Kieffer Bellows	6'0"	201	June 10, 1998	Edina, Minnesota	Boston University (HEA)	New York Islanders
F	28	Jack Roslovic	6'1"	191	January 29, 1997	Columbus, Ohio	Manitoba Moose (AHL)	Winnipeg Jets
F	29	Tage Thompson	6'5"	200	October 30, 1997	Orange, Connecticut	University of Connecticut (HEA)	St. Louis Blues

=== 2018 World Juniors ===
- Won bronze medal

Position	Jersey #	Name	Height	Weight	Birthdate	Hometown	2017–18 Team	NHL rights, if any
G	1	Jeremy Swayman	6'3"	200	November 24, 1998	Anchorage, Alaska	University of Maine (HEA)	Boston Bruins
G	30	Jake Oettinger	6'4"	215	December 18, 1998	Lakeville, Minnesota	Boston University (HEA)	Dallas Stars
G	31	Joseph Woll	6'3"	197	July 12, 1998	St. Louis, Missouri	Boston College (HEA)	Toronto Maple Leafs
D	5	Ryan Lindgren (A)	6'0"	204	February 11, 1998	Minneapolis, Minnesota	University of Minnesota (Big Ten)	Boston Bruins
D	6	Quinn Hughes	5'9"	168	October 14, 1999	Orlando, Florida	University of Michigan (Big Ten)	2018 Draft eligible
D	8	Adam Fox (A)	5'11"	185	February 17, 1998	Jericho, New York	Harvard University (ECAC)	Calgary Flames
D	12	Dylan Samberg	6'4"	215	January 24, 1999	Hermantown, Minnesota	University of Minnesota Duluth (NCHC)	Winnipeg Jets
D	15	Scott Perunovich	5'10"	170	August 18, 1998	Hibbing, Minnesota	University of Minnesota Duluth (NCHC)	None
D	20	Andrew Peeke	6'2"	211	March 17, 1998	Parkland, Florida	University of Notre Dame (Big Ten)	Columbus Blue Jackets
D	24	Mikey Anderson	6'0"	198	May 25, 1999	Roseville, Minnesota	University of Minnesota Duluth (NCHC)	Los Angeles Kings
F	4	Ryan Poehling	6'2"	193	January 3, 1999	Lakeville, Minnesota	St. Cloud State University (NCHC)	Montreal Canadiens
F	7	Brady Tkachuk	6'3"	194	September 16, 1999	St. Louis, Missouri	Boston University (HEA)	2018 Draft eligible
F	9	Josh Norris	6'1"	194	May 5, 1999	Oxford, Michigan	University of Michigan (Big Ten)	San Jose Sharks
F	10	Will Lockwood	6'0"	173	June 20, 1998	Bloomfield Hills, Michigan	University of Michigan (Big Ten)	Vancouver Canucks
F	11	Casey Mittelstadt	6'0"	202	November 22, 1998	Eden Prairie, Minnesota	University of Minnesota (Big Ten)	Buffalo Sabres
F	13	Joey Anderson (C)	6'0"	200	June 19, 1998	Roseville, Minnesota	University of Minnesota Duluth (NCHC)	New Jersey Devils
F	17	Kailer Yamamoto	5'8"	153	September 29, 1998	Spokane, Washington	Spokane Chiefs (WHL)	Edmonton Oilers
F	21	Patrick Harper	5'8"	158	July 29, 1998	New Canaan, Connecticut	Boston University (HEA)	Nashville Predators
F	22	Logan Brown	6'6"	218	March 5, 1998	St. Louis, Missouri	Windsor Spitfires (OHL)	Ottawa Senators
F	23	Kieffer Bellows (A)	6'1"	204	June 10, 1998	Edina, Minnesota	Portland Winterhawks (WHL)	New York Islanders
F	27	Riley Tufte	6'5"	227	April 10, 1998	Ham Lake, Minnesota	University of Minnesota Duluth (NCHC)	Dallas Stars
F	34	Trent Frederic	6'2"	212	February 11, 1998	St. Louis, Missouri	University of Wisconsin (Big Ten)	Boston Bruins
F	49	Max Jones	6'3"	210	February 17, 1998	Rochester, Michigan	London Knights (OHL)	Anaheim Ducks

=== 2019 World Juniors ===
- Won silver medal

Position	Jersey #	Name	Height	Weight	Birthdate	Hometown	2018–19 Team	NHL rights, if any
G	1	Kyle Keyser	6'2"	180	March 8, 1999	Coral Springs, Florida	Oshawa Generals (OHL)	Boston Bruins
G	29	Spencer Knight	6'3"	197	April 19, 2001	Darien, Connecticut	USA Hockey NTDP (USHL)	2019 Draft eligible
G	30	Cayden Primeau	6'3"	200	August 11, 1999	Voorhees, New Jersey	Northeastern University (HEA)	Montreal Canadiens
D	2	Jack St. Ivany	6'2"	195	July 22, 1999	Manhattan Beach, California	Yale University (ECAC)	Philadelphia Flyers
D	4	Dylan Samberg	6'4"	225	January 24, 1999	Hermantown, Minnesota	University of Minnesota Duluth (NCHC)	Winnipeg Jets
D	6	Quinn Hughes (A)	5'10"	175	October 14, 1999	Orlando, Florida	University of Michigan (Big Ten)	Vancouver Canucks
D	20	K'Andre Miller	6'4"	205	January 21, 2000	Saint Paul, Minnesota	University of Wisconsin (Big Ten)	New York Rangers
D	24	Mattias Samuelsson	6'4"	221	March 14, 2000	Voorhees, New Jersey	Western Michigan University (NCHC)	Buffalo Sabres
D	25	Phil Kemp	6'3"	210	February 12, 1999	Greenwich, Connecticut	Yale University (ECAC)	Edmonton Oilers
D	26	Mikey Anderson (C)	6'0"	198	May 25, 1999	Roseville, Minnesota	University of Minnesota Duluth (NCHC)	Los Angeles Kings
F	6	Jack Hughes	5'10"	168	May 14, 2001	Orlando, Florida	USA Hockey NTDP (USHL)	2019 Draft eligible
F	8	Sasha Chmelevski	6'0"	187	June 9, 1999	Northville, Michigan	Ottawa 67's (OHL)	San Jose Sharks
F	9	Tyler Madden	5'11"	150	November 9, 1999	Hartford, Connecticut	Northeastern University (HEA)	Vancouver Canucks
F	11	Ryan Poehling	6'2"	185	January 3, 1999	Lakeville, Minnesota	St. Cloud State University (NCHC)	Montreal Canadiens
F	12	Logan Cockerill	5'9"	175	March 3, 1999	Brighton, Michigan	Boston University (HEA)	New York Islanders
F	14	Josh Norris (A)	6'2"	195	May 5, 1999	Oxford, Michigan	University of Michigan (Big Ten)	Ottawa Senators
F	15	Jason Robertson	6'2"	200	July 22, 1999	Northville, Michigan	Niagara IceDogs (OHL)	Dallas Stars
F	16	Jay O'Brien	6'0"	174	November 4, 1999	Hingham, Massachusetts	Providence College (HEA)	Philadelphia Flyers
F	17	Evan Barratt	5'11"	190	February 18, 1999	Bristol, Pennsylvania	Penn State University (HEA)	Chicago Blackhawks
F	18	Oliver Wahlstrom	6'1"	207	June 13, 2000	Quincy, Massachusetts	Boston College (HEA)	New York Islanders
F	19	Jack Drury	6'0"	180	February 3, 2000	Winnetka, Illinois	Harvard University (ECAC)	Carolina Hurricanes
F	21	Noah Cates	6'2"	185	February 5, 1999	Stillwater, Minnesota	University of Minnesota Duluth (NCHC)	Philadelphia Flyers
F	28	Joel Farabee	6'1"	170	February 25, 2000	Cicero, New York	Boston University (HEA)	Philadelphia Flyers

== See also ==
- Ice hockey at the Olympic Games
- Ice Hockey World Championships
- List of IIHF World Championship medalists
- List of Canadian national ice hockey team rosters
