= List of Dartmouth Big Green men's ice hockey seasons =

This is a season-by-season list of records compiled by Dartmouth in men's ice hockey.

Dartmouth College has played in five NCAA tournaments in its history, with the most recent coming in 2026. They formerly held the longest drought for teams that made at least one appearance, as they went 46 years between appearances from 1980 to 2026. They won the ECAC tournament for the first time in 2026.

== Season-by-season results ==
Note: GP = Games played, W = Wins, L = Losses, T = Ties

NCAA D-I Champions	NCAA Frozen Four	Conference regular season champions	Division champions	Conference Playoff Champions

Season	Conference	Regular Season (Note: Code explanation; GP—Games Played, W—Wins, L—Losses, T—Tied games, OTW—Overtime Wins, OTL—Overtime Loses, 3/SW—Win in 3 on 3 overtime or shootout, Pts—Points*)														Conference Tournament Results	National Tournament Results
Season	Conference	Conference									Overall					Conference Tournament Results	National Tournament Results
Season	Conference	GP	W	L	T	OTW	OTL	3/SW	Pts*	Finish	GP	W	L	T	%	Conference Tournament Results	National Tournament Results
No Coach (1905–1908)
1905–06	Independent	–	–	–	–	–	–	–	–	–	2	1	1	0	.500		
1906–07	IHA	4	2	2	0	–	–	–	4	3rd	7	5	2	0	.714		
1907–08	IHA	4	1	3	0	–	–	–	2	T–3rd	7	1	5	1	.214		
John Eames (1908–1909)
1908–09	IHA	4	3	1	0	–	–	–	6	2nd	14	10	3	1	.750		
Tom Hodge (1909–1910)
1909–10	IHA	4	1	3	0	–	–	–	.250	5th	8	1	7	0	.125		
Ray Vye (1910–1911)
1910–11	IHA	5	1	4	0	–	–	–	2	T–5th	11	5	6	0	.455		
W. Rawley (1911–1912)
1911–12	IHA	4	0	4	0	–	–	–	0	5th	5	0	5	0	.000		
Fred Rocque (1912–1915)
1912–13	IHA	2	1	1	0	–	–	–	2	2nd	10	8	2	0	.800		
1913–14	Independent	–	–	–	–	–	–	–	–	–	9	7	2	0	.778		
1914–15	Independent	–	–	–	–	–	–	–	–	–	7	3	4	0	.429		
Clarence Wanamaker (1915–1918)
1915–16	Independent	–	–	–	–	–	–	–	–	–	11	6	5	0	.545		
1916–17	Independent	–	–	–	–	–	–	–	–	–	10	7	3	0	.700		
1917–18	Independent	–	–	–	–	–	–	–	–	–	6	2	4	0	.333		
Program suspended due to World War I
Clarence Wanamaker (1919–1920)
1919–20	Independent	–	–	–	–	–	–	–	–	–	10	6	4	0	.600		
Leon Tuck (1920–1921)
1920–21	Independent	–	–	–	–	–	–	–	–	–	11	6	4	1	.591		
Chippy Gaw (1921–1922)
1921–22	Independent	–	–	–	–	–	–	–	–	–	6	4	1	1	.750		
Leon Tuck (1922–1924)
1922–23	Independent	–	–	–	–	–	–	–	–	–	15	13	2	0	.867		
1923–24	Independent	–	–	–	–	–	–	–	–	–	17	10	5	2	.647		
Harry Denesha (1924–1926)
1924–25	Independent	–	–	–	–	–	–	–	–	–	8	4	3	1	.563		
1925–26	Independent	–	–	–	–	–	–	–	–	–	15	12	3	0	.800		
J. Philip Bower (1926–1933)
1926–27	Independent	–	–	–	–	–	–	–	–	–	15	11	2	2	.800		
1927–28	Independent	–	–	–	–	–	–	–	–	–	10	6	4	0	.600		
1928–29	Independent	–	–	–	–	–	–	–	–	–	17	9	5	3	.618		
1929–30	Independent	–	–	–	–	–	–	–	–	–	13	5	8	0	.385		
1930–31	Independent	–	–	–	–	–	–	–	–	–	13	5	8	0	.385		
1931–32	Independent	–	–	–	–	–	–	–	–	–	10	4	6	0	.400		
1932–33	Independent	–	–	–	–	–	–	–	–	–	10	2	8	0	.200		
Herbert Gill (1933–1937)
1933–34	Quadrangular League	6	5	1	0	–	–	–	.833	1st	17	12	5	0	.706		
1934–35	Quadrangular League	6	1	5	0	–	–	–	.167	T–3rd	21	10	11	0	.476		
1935–36	Quadrangular League	6	3	3	0	–	–	–	.500	T–2nd	22	16	5	1	.750		
1936–37	Quadrangular League	6	3	3	0	–	–	–	.500	2nd	25	12	13	0	.480		
Eddie Jeremiah (1937–1942)
1937–38	Quadrangular League	6	6	0	0	–	–	–	1.000	1st	22	18	4	0	.818		
1938–39	Quadrangular League	6	6	0	0	–	–	–	1.000	1st	21	17	4	0	.810		
1939–40	Quadrangular League	6	2	4	0	–	–	–	.333	3rd	18	9	7	2	.556		
1940–41	Quadrangular League	6	1	3	2	–	–	–	.333	3rd	14	7	5	2	.571		
1941–42	Quadrangular League	6	6	0	0	–	–	–	1.000	1st	23	21	2	0	.913		
George T. Barclay/Dick Rondeau (1942–1943)
1942–43	Quadrangular League	6	6	0	0	–	–	–	1.000	1st	15	14	0	1	.967		
Charles Arthur (1943–1945)
1943–44	Independent	–	–	–	–	–	–	–	–	–	7	7	0	0	1.000		
1944–45	Independent	–	–	–	–	–	–	–	–	–	5	5	0	0	1.000		
Eddie Jeremiah (1945–1963)
1945–46	Independent	–	–	–	–	–	–	–	–	–	8	6	2	0	.750		
1946–47	Pentagonal League	7	6	1	0	–	–	–	.857	1st	20	16	2	2	.850	Won Playoff, 5–2 (Yale)	
1947–48	Pentagonal League	7	7	0	0	–	–	–	1.000	1st	24	21	3	0	.875		Won Semifinal 8–4 (Colorado College); Lost Championship 4–8 (Michigan)
1948–49	Pentagonal League	8	6	2	0	–	–	–	.750	1st	23	17	6	0	.739	Won Playoff, 7–2 (Harvard)	Won Semifinal 4–2 (Michigan); Lost Championship 3–4 (Boston College)
1949–50	Pentagonal League	8	4	4	0	–	–	–	.500	3rd	20	11	9	0	.550		
1950–51	Pentagonal League	8	3	4	1	–	–	–	.438	3rd	19	9	9	1	.500		
1951–52	Pentagonal League	8	0	8	0	–	–	–	.000	5th	23	5	18	0	.217		
1952–53	Pentagonal League	8	1	7	0	–	–	–	.125	5th	23	9	14	0	.391		
1953–54	Pentagonal League	8	3	5	0	–	–	–	.375	4th	28	15	13	0	.536		
1954–55	Pentagonal League	8	2	6	0	–	–	–	.250	4th	21	10	11	0	.476		
1955–56	Independent	–	–	–	–	–	–	–	–	–	23	5	18	0	.217		
1956–57	Independent	–	–	–	–	–	–	–	–	–	25	13	12	0	.520		
1957–58	Independent	–	–	–	–	–	–	–	–	–	24	13	10	1	.563		
1958–59	Independent	–	–	–	–	–	–	–	–	–	25	17	8	0	.680		
1959–60	Independent	–	–	–	–	–	–	–	–	–	20	14	5	1	.788		
1960–61	Independent	–	–	–	–	–	–	–	–	–	19	8	11	0	.421		
1961–62	ECAC Hockey	20	8	12	0	–	–	–	.400	20th	20	8	12	0	.400		
1962–63	ECAC Hockey	20	8	12	0	–	–	–	.400	19th	20	8	12	0	.400		
Abner Oakes (1963–1964)
1963–64	ECAC Hockey	21	14	7	0	–	–	–	.667	T–6th	21	14	7	0	.667		
University Division
Eddie Jeremiah (1964–1967)
1964–65	ECAC Hockey	16	8	8	0	–	–	–	.500	7th	23	14	9	0	.609	Lost quarterfinal 1–4 (Boston College)	
1965–66	ECAC Hockey	18	2	14	2	–	–	–	.167	13th	24	5	17	2	.250		
1966–67	ECAC Hockey	15	1	14	0	–	–	–	.067	T–15th	20	4	16	0	.200		
Abner Oakes (1967–1970)
1967–68	ECAC Hockey	21	2	19	0	–	–	–	.095	16th	23	4	19	0	.174		
1968–69	ECAC Hockey	21	6	13	2	–	–	–	.333	13th	23	7	14	2	.348		
1969–70	ECAC Hockey	19	5	14	0	–	–	–	.263	13th	24	9	15	0	.375		
Grant Standbrook (1970–1975)
1970–71	ECAC Hockey	21	6	15	0	–	–	–	.286	13th	24	9	15	0	.375		
1971–72	ECAC Hockey	18	9	8	1	–	–	–	.528	9th	24	13	10	1	.563		
1972–73	ECAC Hockey	20	8	11	1	–	–	–	.425	12th	24	12	11	1	.521		
Division I
1973–74	ECAC Hockey	22	12	10	0	–	–	–	.545	6th	25	13	11	1	.540	Lost quarterfinal 0–8 (Boston University)	
Changed university nickname from Indians to Big Green
1974–75	ECAC Hockey	22	4	17	1	–	–	–	.205	16th	24	5	18	1	.229		
George Crowe (1975–1984)
1975–76	ECAC Hockey	24	14	10	0	–	–	–	.583	6th	27	16	11	0	.593	Lost quarterfinal 4–5 (Brown)	
1976–77	ECAC Hockey	24	11	12	1	–	–	–	.479	10th	26	12	12	2	.500		
1977–78	ECAC Hockey	23	9	14	0	–	–	–	.391	T–11th	26	11	15	0	.423		
1978–79	ECAC Hockey	22	14	7	1	–	–	–	.659	4th	30	19	9	2	.667	Won Quarterfinal 2–1 (Clarkson); Won Semifinal 5–3 (Boston University); Lost Championship 2–3 (New Hampshire)	Lost semifinal 2–4 (North Dakota); Won Third-place game 7–3 (New Hampshire)
1979–80	ECAC Hockey	22	15	6	1	–	–	–	.705	3rd	31	19	11	1	.629	Won Quarterfinal 8–0 (Rensselaer); Won Semifinal 6–4 (Clarkson); Lost Championship 1–5 (Cornell)	Lost semifinal 1–4 (North Dakota); Won Third-place game 8–4 (Cornell)
1980–81	ECAC Hockey	22	8	14	0	–	–	–	.364	15th	26	10	16	0	.385		
1981–82	ECAC Hockey	21	6	14	1	–	–	–	.310	15th	26	10	15	1	.404		
1982–83	ECAC Hockey	21	6	14	1	–	–	–	.310	14th	26	9	15	2	.385		
1983–84	ECAC Hockey	21	3	18	0	–	–	–	.143	12th	26	3	23	0	.115		
Brian Mason (1984–1990)
1984–85	ECAC Hockey	21	3	17	1	–	–	–	7	11th	24	5	18	1	.229		
1985–86	ECAC Hockey	21	4	17	0	–	–	–	8	10th	25	7	18	0	.280		
1986–87	ECAC Hockey	22	2	19	1	–	–	–	5	12th	25	2	22	1	.100		
1987–88	ECAC Hockey	22	8	13	1	–	–	–	17	9th	26	10	15	1	.404		
1988–89	ECAC Hockey	22	7	14	1	–	–	–	15	9th	26	8	17	1	.327		
1989–90	ECAC Hockey	22	4	14	4	–	–	–	12	11th	26	4	18	4	.231		
Ben Smith (1990–1991)
1990–91	ECAC Hockey	22	0	19	3	–	–	–	3	12th	28	1	24	3	.089		
Roger Demment (1991–1997)
1991–92	ECAC Hockey	22	3	17	2	–	–	–	8	11th	26	3	21	2	.154		
1992–93	ECAC Hockey	22	9	13	0	–	–	–	18	T–8th	27	11	16	0	.407	Lost preliminary 3–4 (Colgate)	
1993–94	ECAC Hockey	22	4	17	1	–	–	–	9	12th	27	5	21	1	.204		
1994–95	ECAC Hockey	22	7	13	2	–	–	–	16	T–10th	27	9	16	2	.370		
1995–96	ECAC Hockey	22	6	14	2	–	–	–	14	9th	30	7	20	3	.283	Lost preliminary 4–5 (Rensselaer)	
1996–97	ECAC Hockey	22	5	15	2	–	–	–	12	11th	29	10	17	2	.379		
Bob Gaudet (1997–2020)
1997–98	ECAC Hockey	22	7	12	3	–	–	–	17	11th	29	11	13	5	.466		
1998–99	ECAC Hockey	22	6	14	5	–	–	–	14	11th	29	10	17	2	.379		
1999–00	ECAC Hockey	21	8	10	3	–	–	–	19	8th	30	9	17	4	.367	Lost First round series 0–2 (Rensselaer)	
2000–01	ECAC Hockey	22	10	8	4	–	–	–	24	T–5th	34	16	14	4	.529	Won First round series 2–0 (Rensselaer); Won Four vs. Five 3–2 (Vermont); Lost semifinal 0–2 (St. Lawrence); Lost Third-place game 2–3 (Harvard)	
2001–02	ECAC Hockey	22	9	8	5	–	–	–	23	T–3rd	32	14	13	5	.516	Won First round series 2–0 (Colgate); Lost Four vs. Five 1–2 (Rensselaer)	
2002–03	ECAC Hockey	22	13	9	0	–	–	–	26	T–3rd	34	20	13	1	.603	Won Quarterfinal series 2–1 (Colgate); Lost semifinal 3–5 (Harvard); Won Third-place game 4–2 (Brown)	
2003–04	ECAC Hockey	22	10	5	7	–	–	–	27	T–4th	34	14	11	9	.544	Won Quarterfinal series 2–1 (Rensselaer); Lost semifinal 1–2 (Harvard); Lost Third-place game 2–3 (Colgate)	
2004–05	ECAC Hockey	22	14	8	0	–	–	–	28	5th	35	20	13	2	.600	Won First round series 2–1 (Yale); Lost quarterfinal series 1–2 (Vermont)	
2005–06	ECAC Hockey	22	14	6	2	–	–	–	30	T–1st	33	19	12	2	.606	Won Quarterfinal series 2–0 (Yale); Lost semifinal 1–10 (Harvard); Won Third-place game 3–2 (Colgate)	
2006–07	ECAC Hockey	22	12	7	3	–	–	–	27	3rd	33	18	12	3	.591	Won Quarterfinal series 2–0 (Princeton); Lost semifinal 4–5 (Clarkson); Lost Third-place game 3–5 (St. Lawrence)	
2007–08	ECAC Hockey	22	6	13	3	–	–	–	15	T–10th	32	12	16	4	.438	Lost First round series 1–2 (Cornell)	
2008–09	ECAC Hockey	22	11	9	2	–	–	–	24	T–5th	31	14	14	3	.500	Lost First round series 0–2 (Brown)	
2009–10	ECAC Hockey	22	7	12	3	–	–	–	17	T–9th	32	10	19	3	.359	Lost First round series 1–2 (Quinnipiac)	
2010–11	ECAC Hockey	22	12	8	2	–	–	–	26	3rd	34	19	12	3	.603	Won Quarterfinal series 2–1 (Harvard); Lost semifinal 0–3 (Cornell); Won Third-place game 5–3 (Colgate)	
2011–12	ECAC Hockey	22	8	11	3	–	–	–	19	9th	33	13	16	4	.455	Won First round series 2–0 (St. Lawrence); Lost quarterfinal series 0–2 (Cornell)	
2012–13	ECAC Hockey	22	9	9	4	–	–	–	22	T–5th	34	15	14	5	.515	Won First round series 2–1 (Harvard); Lost quarterfinal series 0–2 (Union)	
2013–14	ECAC Hockey	22	7	13	2	–	–	–	16	T–10th	34	10	20	4	.353	Won First round series 2–1 (Rensselaer); Lost quarterfinal series 0–2 (Union)	
2014–15	ECAC Hockey	22	12	8	2	–	–	–	26	T–4th	32	17	12	4	.576	Won First round series 2–0 (Princeton); Lost quarterfinal series 0–2 (Colgate)	
2015–16	ECAC Hockey	22	11	11	0	–	–	–	22	T–7th	35	18	16	1	.529	Won First round series 2–1 (Colgate); Won Quarterfinal series 2–0 (Yale); Lost semifinal 1–3 (Quinnipiac)	
2016–17	ECAC Hockey	22	7	13	2	–	–	–	16	9th	31	10	18	3	.371	Lost First round series 0–2 (Yale)	
2017–18	ECAC Hockey	22	11	10	1	–	–	–	23	T–5th	35	16	17	2	.486	Won First round series 2–1 (St. Lawrence); Lost quarterfinal series 1–2 (Harvard)	
2018–19	ECAC Hockey	22	10	9	3	–	–	–	23	T–5th	34	13	17	4	.441	Won First round series, 2–1 (St. Lawrence); Lost quarterfinal series, 0–2 (Harvard)	
2019–20	ECAC Hockey	22	10	10	2	–	–	–	22	6th	31	13	14	4	.484	Lost First round series, 0–2 (Princeton)	
Reid Cashman (2020–Present)
2020–21	ECAC Hockey	Season cancelled															
2021–22	ECAC Hockey	22	5	15	2	0	3	1	21	T–11th	32	7	22	3	.266	Lost First round series, 1–2 (Rensselaer)	
2022–23	ECAC Hockey	22	4	17	1	0	2	1	16	12th	30	5	24	1	.183	Lost First round, 3–5 (Colgate)	
2023–24	ECAC Hockey	22	9	6	7	1	1	3	27	4th	32	13	10	9	.547	Won Quarterfinal series, 2–0 (Union); Lost Semifinal, 3–6 (Cornell)	
2024–25	ECAC Hockey	22	12	9	1	0	2	0	39	5th	33	18	13	2	.576	Won First Round, 6–2 (St. Lawrence); Won Quarterfinal series, 2–0 (Union); Lost Semifinal, 1–4 (Clarkson)	
Totals											GP	W	L	T	%	Championships	
Regular Season											2504	1127	1221	156	.481	5 Quadrangular Championships, 3 Pentagonal Championships, 1 ECAC Divisional Championship, 1 ECAC Championship	
Conference Post-season											108	49	59	0	.454		
NCAA Post-season											8	4	4	0	.500	4 NCAA Tournament appearances	
Regular Season and Post-season Record											2620	1180	1284	156	.480		

* Winning percentage is used when conference schedules are unbalanced.
