= Grant Standbrook =

Canadian ice hockey player and coach

Biographical details
- Born: September 18, 1937 (age 89); Winnipeg, Manitoba, Canada
- Education: Minnesota-Duluth

Playing career
- 1959–1961: Minnesota-Duluth
- Position: Center

Coaching career (HC unless noted)
- 1963–1966: Greenway High School
- 1966–1970: Dartmouth (assistant)
- 1970–1975: Dartmouth
- 1974–1975: US National Team (assistant)
- 1976: US Olympic Team (assistant)
- 1976–1987: Wisconsin (assistant)
- 1987–1988: HC Varese
- 1988–2008: Maine (assistant)
- 2010–2013: Dubuque Fighting Saints (goaltending coach)

Head coaching record
- Overall: 52-65-3 (.446)

Accomplishments and honors

Championships
- 1977 National Championship (assistant); 1981 National Championship (assistant); 1983 National Championship (assistant); 1993 National Championship (assistant); 1999 National Championship (assistant); 2011 Clark Cup (assistant); 2013 Clark Cup (assistant)

Awards
- 2012 Manitoba Sports Hall of Fame

Grant Standbrook (born September 18, 1937) is a Canadian retired ice hockey player and coach who spent over 40 years in the college ranks.

== Career ==
Standbrook played two seasons at Minnesota-Duluth while the team competed as an Independent in the early 1960s. A few years after his playing days ended Standbrook started coaching at the high school level with Greenway High School in Coleraine, Minnesota. After three years as head coach he joined the staff at Dartmouth under first Eddie Jeremiah and then Abner Oakes before leading the program himself starting in 1970.

Dartmouth had been suffering through several bad seasons throughout the 1950s and 60s but Standbrook was able to get the Big Green to post three consecutive winning campaigns in over a decade in his second through fourth years. In recognition of his abilities Standbrook was made an assistant coach for the US National Team for the 1974 World Championship and saw the nation promoted to the top division for the first time since 1971. The following year saw Dartmouth drop in the standings, finishing with a 5-19 record and though he was invited back to serve on the 1975 World Championship team, they fared even worse, going 0-10 and being outscored 22-84 in the tournament. Despite the disappointing year Standbrook was offered as assistant coaching position with the 1976 US Olympic Team under Bob Johnson. Due to the time that the games were to be held (February 2–14, 1976) and the commitments to the team leading up to the 1976 Olympics Standbrook turned over the reins of the Big Green to George Crowe. Team USA finished a respectable 5th place at the Olympics though it was a bit of a disappointment as the team had garnered the silver medal in 1972.

When Johnson returned to Wisconsin to resume coaching the Badgers, he took Standbrook with him. After a down year under interim head coach Bill Rothwell Johnson and Standbrook got the Badgers back to their winning ways, posting a still team record 37 wins in 1976–77 en route to the program's second national title. Standbrook remained in Madison for ten years, winning two more national titles (one more with Johnson and another under his successor Jeff Sauer) before trying his hand at the top job once more, heading to Italy to take over HC Varese. While the team performed well, reaching the semifinals that year Standbrook returned to the college ranks the following year as an assistant to Shawn Walsh at Maine.

Standbrook would stay with the Black Bears for the next twenty years at the same position. He was part of two more national championship teams in 1993 and 1999 and even continued after Walsh lost a battle with cancer in 2001. Standbrook announced that he was retiring from full-time coaching following the 2005–06 season and remained as a volunteer assistant for two more years before fully retiring. Two years hence he was lured back to the game by former Maine player Jim Montgomery to be the goaltending coach for the Dubuque Fighting Saints and aided his former player for three seasons, helping capture two more championships. When Montgomery accepted the head coaching position with Denver in 2013 Standbrook decided against following and even turned down an offer to return to Maine, bringing to close a long and successful career.

Standbrook was inducted into the Manitoba Sports Hall of Fame in 2012.

== Head coaching record ==
Record table
Season	Team	Overall	Conference	Standing	Postseason
Dartmouth Indians (ECAC Hockey) (1970–1974)
1970-71	Dartmouth	9-15-0	6-15-0	13th	
1971-72	Dartmouth	13-10-0	9-8-1	9th	
1972-73	Dartmouth	12-11-1	8-11-1	12th	
1973-74	Dartmouth	13-11-1	12-10-0	6th	ECAC Quarterfinals
Dartmouth Big Green (ECAC Hockey) (1974–1975)
1974-75	Dartmouth	5-18-1	4-17-1	16th	
Dartmouth:		52-65-3	39-61-3		
Total:		52-65-3			
National champion Postseason invitational champion Conference regular season champion Conference regular season and conference tournament champion Division regular season champion Division regular season and conference tournament champion Conference tournament champion
