= Ross Brownridge =

Canadian ice hockey player

- Born: April 1, 1957 (age 69) Brampton, Ontario, Canada
- Height: 6 ft 0 in (183 cm)
- Weight: 181 lb (82 kg; 12 st 13 lb)
- Position: Center
- Shot: Left
- Played for: Dartmouth; Erie Blades; Fredericton Express
- Playing career: 1976–1983

Ross J. Brownridge is a Canadian retired ice hockey center who was an All-American for Dartmouth.

== Career ==
Brownridge joined the ice hockey program at Dartmouth College in the fall of 1976, as a member of the second recruiting class for George Crowe. When Brownridge arrived in Hanover, the Big Green had not won a playoff game in 27 years and had never finished above 6th in the ECAC Hockey standings. That trend continued during his first two seasons as the team remained mired in mediocrity, but Brownridge nearly doubled his point production in his sophomore campaign. As a junior, Brownridge saw the program's fortunes change. While his goal production doubled from 10 to 20, Brownridge saw the team win an increasing number of games, finishing the regular season 4th in the conference. The Big Green played the first home playoff game in program history and then defeated top-seeded Boston University in the semifinal to reach the championship game. While Dartmouth finished as runners-up, the team received the second eastern seed in the NCAA Tournament, making the tournament for the first time in 30 years.

Brownridge was selected as team captain for his senior season and replied by upping his goal total to 30 en route to earning All-American honors (the first Dartmouth player in 20 years to do so). Brownridge led the Big Green in scoring by 20 points and led the squad to a Ivy Division championship as well as a 3rd-place finish in their conference. The Big Green finished as runners-up for the second straight year and made another tournament appearance. Dartmouth has not been back to the NCAA tournament since (as of 2021). Brownridge led ECAC Hockey in goal scoring that year, the last Dartmouth skater to do so until Drew O'Connor in 2020. Brownridge sits third in career goals and points for Dartmouth as well as second in assists, however, because the NCAA does not track statistics prior to 1947 (the year the national tournament began), Brownridge is the current leader in all three categories for the Big Green in NCAA play.

After graduating Brownridge played three seasons of professional hockey. He began by winning a championship with the Erie Blades in 1981 and then retired after a short stint with the Fredericton Express.

== Statistics ==
=== Regular season and playoffs ===
| | | | Regular Season | | | | | Playoffs |
| Season | Team | League | GP | G | A | Pts | PIM | GP | G | A | Pts | PIM |
|---|---|---|---|---|---|---|---|---|---|---|---|---|
| 1974–75 | Brampton Vic Woods | COJHL | — | — | — | — | — | — | — | — | — | — |
| 1975–76 | Brampton Chevies | COJHL | — | — | — | — | — | — | — | — | — | — |
| 1976–77 | Dartmouth | ECAC Hockey | 21 | 10 | 12 | 22 | 8 | — | — | — | — | — |
| 1977–78 | Dartmouth | ECAC Hockey | 26 | 10 | 29 | 39 | 26 | — | — | — | — | — |
| 1978–79 | Dartmouth | ECAC Hockey | 27 | 20 | 26 | 46 | 12 | — | — | — | — | — |
| 1979–80 | Dartmouth | ECAC Hockey | 31 | 30 | 29 | 59 | 39 | — | — | — | — | — |
| 1980–81 | Erie Blades | EHL | 72 | 30 | 42 | 72 | 59 | 8 | 2 | 11 | 13 | 17 |
| 1981–82 | Fredericton Express | AHL | 25 | 7 | 10 | 17 | 52 | — | — | — | — | — |
| 1982–83 | Fredericton Express | AHL | 3 | 0 | 0 | 0 | 0 | — | — | — | — | — |
| NCAA totals | | | 105 | 70 | 96 | 166 | 84 | — | — | — | — | — |

== Awards and honors ==
| Award | Year |
|---|---|
| All-ECAC Hockey First Team | 1979–80 |
| AHCA East All-American | 1979–80 |
