= John Grocott =

American ice hockey player (1930–2012)

- Born: February 15, 1930 Melrose, Massachusetts, USA
- Died: May 18, 2012 (aged 82) Concord, New Hampshire, USA
- Position: Defenseman
- Played for: Dartmouth
- National team: United States
- Playing career: 1948–1953
- Military career
- Allegiance: United States
- Branch: United States Marine Corps
- Service years: 1952-1954

John Grocott (February 15, 1930 – May 18, 2012) was an American ice hockey defenseman who played for Dartmouth College in the early 1950s.

== Career ==
Grocott graduated from Melrose High School, Massachusetts, in 1948 and then headed north to attend Dartmouth. He joined the ice hockey team in the midst of their back-to-back appearances in the championship game appearances, but as he was a freshman he was unable to yet play with the varsity team. By the time Grocott appeared for Eddie Jeremiah's team in 1949, many of the star players had already graduated and Dartmouth was no longer the premier power they had been throughout the decade. That did not stop Grocott from establishing himself as one of the best defensemen in country. In his senior season he was named as team captain and, despite the Indians finishing with a 5–18 record, he was named as an AHCA First Team All-American.

During his tenure at Dartmouth, Grocott was a member of Phi Gamma Delta and graduated with a degree in economics. After college he joined the Marines and fought in the Korean War. After returning from Korea, Grocott laced up his skates one final time, joining the US national team for the 1955 Ice Hockey World Championships. The team was in the running for the bronze medal to the end, but a tie in their final game against Sweden allowed the Czechs the opening they needed to claim sole possession of third place, and Grocott's team finished off of the podium.

After his hockey career ended, Grocott worked for Merrill Lynch and was promoted to Assistant Manager when the company opened its Honolulu branch in 1969. Grocott returned to New Hampshire in 1985 and settled there for the rest of his life.

== Personal ==
John married his wife Judith in 1956 and the pair had four children. John and Judith remained together until his death in 2012 after a long illness.

== Statistics ==
=== International ===
Year	Team	GP	G	A	Pts	PIM
1955	United States	8	1	0	1	8

== Awards and honors ==
Award	Year
AHCA First Team All-American	1951–52
