= Bob Gaudet =

American ice hockey player & coach (born 1959)

Biographical details
- Born: March 9, 1959 (age 67); Saugus, Massachusetts, U.S.

Playing career
- 1977–1981: Dartmouth
- 1981–1982: Fort Wayne Komets
- Position: Goaltender

Coaching career (HC unless noted)
- 1983–1988: Dartmouth (assistant)
- 1988–1997: Brown
- 1997–2020: Dartmouth

Head coaching record
- Overall: 424–482–112 (.472)
- Tournaments: 0–1 (.000)

Accomplishments and honors

Championships
- 2006 ECAC Hockey Regular Season Champion

Awards
- 1995 ECAC Hockey Coach of the Year Award; 2006 ECAC Hockey Coach of the Year Award

Bob Gaudet is an American ice hockey coach who served as the head coach at Dartmouth from 1997 until 2020.

== Career ==
Bob Gaudet started his term at Dartmouth playing three games in goal for the Big Green as a freshman. Once he became the starter the following year Dartmouth had one of its most successful periods, winning 19 games in back-to-back years and reaching the NCAA tournament both years (the last time Dartmouth was able to do so). Gaudet graduated after the 1980–81 season and pursued a short professional career before retiring a player.

Gaudet returned to his alma mater in 1982 as an assistant coach first under George Crowe and then Brian Mason before accepting an offer to become the head coach at Brown. Gaudet began slowly at Brown, going 1–25 in his first season as he tried to repair a flagging program, rebounding with a 10-win campaign in his second year. In 1992–93 Gaudet got Brown to their first winning season in 16 years, earning the team its first tournament berth since 1976 (their last as of 2021). Two years and two Winning seasons later Gaudet received the ECAC Hockey Coach of the Year Award.

After the promotion of Roger Demment to an administrative position Dartmouth turned to Gaudet to fill the post, giving him a third stint in Hanover. As he had done with Brown, Gaudet took a few years to return Dartmouth a prominent position, providing the Dartmouth faithful with a winning season in 2000–01, their first since his junior season. That began a run of seven consecutive seasons with Dartmouth above .500 including their first conference regular season title in 2005–06. For his effort, Gaudet was awarded his second Coach of the Year Award. In his time at Dartmouth Gaudet has become the second most successful coach in program history, behind only Eddie Jeremiah in terms of both wins and tenure.

== Head coaching record ==
Record table
Season	Team	Overall	Conference	Standing	Postseason
Brown Bears (ECAC Hockey) (1988–1997)
1988–89	Brown	1–25–0	1–21–0	12th	
1989–90	Brown	10–16–3	8–11–3	8th	ECAC Quarterfinals
1990–91	Brown	9–15–3	9–11–2	t-8th	ECAC First Round
1991–92	Brown	11–15–4	10–8–4	t-5th	ECAC Quarterfinals
1992–93	Brown	16–12–3	13–7–2	t-3rd	NCAA West Regional Quarterfinals
1993–94	Brown	15–13–4	12–7–3	4th	ECAC Third Place Game (Loss)
1994–95	Brown	15–12–3	13–7–2	2nd	ECAC Quarterfinals
1995–96	Brown	9–15–8	5–11–6	t-7th	ECAC Quarterfinals
1996–97	Brown	7–19–3	4–16–2	12th	
Brown:		93–142–31	75–99–24		
Dartmouth Big Green (ECAC Hockey) (1997–2020)
1997–98	Dartmouth	11–13–5	7–12–3	11th	
1998–99	Dartmouth	10–17–2	6–14–5	11th	
1999-00	Dartmouth	9–17–4	8–10–3	8th	ECAC First Round
2000–01	Dartmouth	16–14–4	10–8–4	t-5th	ECAC Third Place Game (Loss)
2001–02	Dartmouth	14–13–5	9–8–5	t-3rd	ECAC Four vs. Five
2002–03	Dartmouth	20–13–1	13–9–0	t-3rd	ECAC Third Place Game (Win)
2003–04	Dartmouth	14–11–9	10–5–7	t-4th	ECAC Third Place Game (Loss)
2004–05	Dartmouth	20–13–2	14–8–0	5th	ECAC Quarterfinals
2005–06	Dartmouth	19–12–2	14–6–2	t-1st	ECAC Third Place Game (Win)
2006–07	Dartmouth	18–12–3	12–7–3	3rd	ECAC Third Place Game (Loss)
2007–08	Dartmouth	12–16–4	6–13–3	t-10th	ECAC First Round
2008–09	Dartmouth	14–14–3	11–9–2	t-5th	ECAC First Round
2009–10	Dartmouth	10–19–3	7–12–3	t-9th	ECAC First Round
2010–11	Dartmouth	19–12–3	12–8–2	3rd	ECAC Third Place Game (Win)
2011–12	Dartmouth	13–16–4	8–11–3	9th	ECAC Quarterfinals
2012–13	Dartmouth	15–14–5	9–9–4	t-5th	ECAC Quarterfinals
2013–14	Dartmouth	10–20–4	7–13–2	t-10th	ECAC Quarterfinals
2014–15	Dartmouth	17–12–4	12–8–2	t-4th	ECAC Quarterfinals
2015–16	Dartmouth	18–16–1	11–11–0	t-7th	ECAC Semifinals
2016–17	Dartmouth	10–18–3	7–13–2	9th	ECAC First Round
2017–18	Dartmouth	16–17–2	11–10–1	t-5th	ECAC Quarterfinals
2018–19	Dartmouth	13–17–4	10–9–3	t-5th	ECAC Quarterfinals
2019–20	Dartmouth	13–14–4	10–10–2	6th	ECAC First Round
Dartmouth:		331–340–81	224–223–62		
Total:		424–482–112			
National champion Postseason invitational champion Conference regular season champion Conference regular season and conference tournament champion Division regular season champion Division regular season and conference tournament champion Conference tournament champion

Awards and achievements
Preceded by Bruce Delventhal; Mike Schafer	Tim Taylor Award; 1994–95; 2005–06	Succeeded by Joe Marsh; Joe Marsh
