= David Jones (ice hockey) =

Canadian ice hockey player (born 1984)

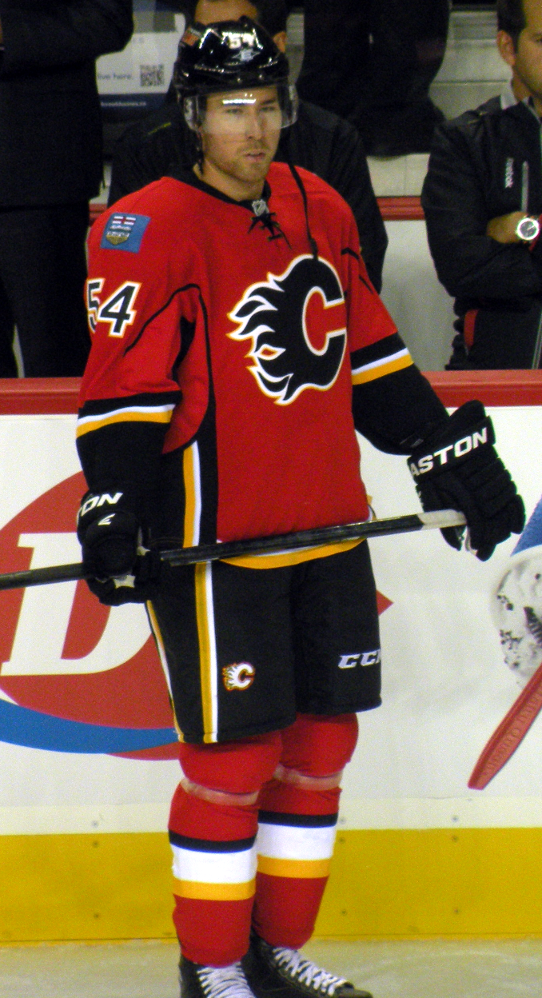
- Born: August 10, 1984 (age 42) Guelph, Ontario, Canada
- Height: 6 ft 2 in (188 cm)
- Weight: 210 lb (95 kg; 15 st 0 lb)
- Position: Right wing
- Shot: Right
- Played for: Colorado Avalanche; Calgary Flames; Minnesota Wild
- NHL draft: 288th overall, 2003; Colorado Avalanche
- Playing career: 2007–2016

David Jones (born August 10, 1984) is a Canadian former professional ice hockey right winger who played for the Colorado Avalanche, Calgary Flames, and Minnesota Wild in the National Hockey League (NHL).

== Playing career ==
=== Early years ===
While playing with the Coquitlam Express minor junior team of the British Columbia Hockey League, Jones was drafted in his first year of eligibly as the Colorado Avalanche's last pick in the ninth round of the 2003 NHL entry draft, 288th overall. After being selected to the BCHL First All-Star team he committed to play collegiate hockey at Dartmouth College in the ECAC. In his third season with the Big Green in 2006–07, he led the team with 44 points becoming just the third player in Dartmouth history to be named Ivy League Player of the Year, while also earning a selection as a finalist for the Hobey Baker Award.

=== Colorado Avalanche ===
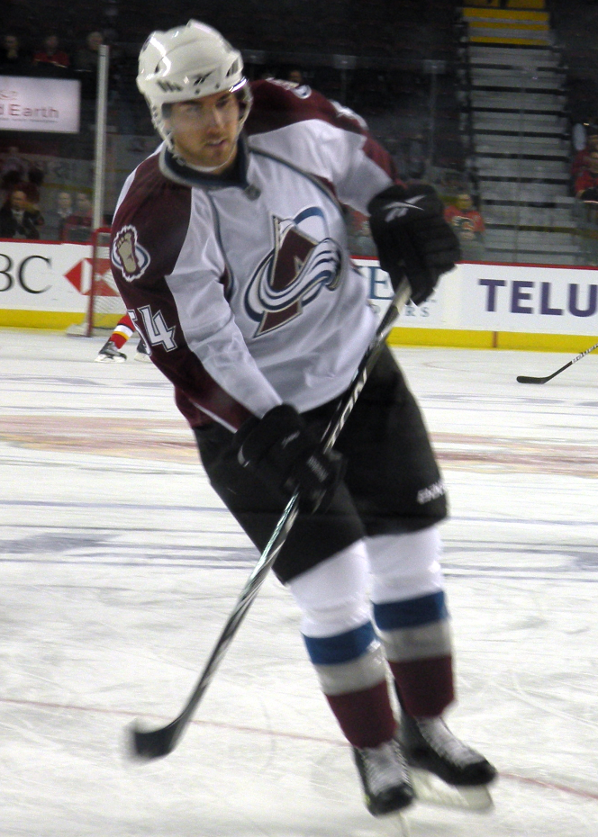
Jones as a member of the Avalanche in 2009

After completing his junior year with the Big Green, Jones decided against returning for his senior year, signing a two-year entry-level contract with the Avalanche on May 21, 2007. He was initially assigned in his first professional season of 2007–08 to the American Hockey League (AHL) with affiliate the Lake Erie Monsters before being recalled by the Avalanche on December 20, 2007. He made his debut the following night in a 4–3 victory over the New York Rangers on December 21, becoming the lowest selected Avalanche draft pick to play in the NHL. Highlighted by his skating speed despite a large frame, Jones scored 30 points in 45 games with the Monsters before his was again recalled for a third time and stayed with the Avalanche for the remainder of the season. On March 11, 2008, Jones scored his first career NHL goal in a 5–2 victory over the Atlanta Thrashers. He also tallied two assists and was named as the first star of the game.

Injuries limited most of Jones' first full season in the NHL, and his third season with the Avalanche showed much promise. After scoring ten goals and six assists for 16 points in his 23rd game of the 2009–10 season, injury found Jones again on November 28, 2009, in a 3–2 shootout loss against the Minnesota Wild. He tangled up with Minnesota's Chuck Kobasew at center ice and landed hard with his knee in an awkward position just before teammate Paul Stastny tripped over him. He left the Pepsi Center with a torn anterior cruciate ligament and would miss the remainder of the regular season and playoffs.

Jones returned to complete his first full healthy season for the Avalanche in 2010–11, and despite losing a glimpse of his speed from his repaired ACL, he was rewarded with playing a career high 77 games and tied Matt Duchene for the team lead in goals with 27.

Given a one-year contract extension on June 29, 2011, Jones initially got off to a slow start in the 2011–12 season before responding with a strong second half to reach the 20 goal plateau for a second consecutive year, largely in part to establishing a partnership playing with longtime line-mate Stastny and the newly acquired Jamie McGinn to end the year. With the option of potentially exploring free-agency, Jones was instead signed to a four-year, $16 million contract keeping him with the team through the 2015–16 season, on June 7, 2012. In the first year of his new contract, during the lockout-shortened 2012–13 season, Jones struggled in compiling his worst professional season totals with only 3 goals and 9 points in 33 games.

=== Calgary Flames ===
On June 27, 2013, Jones' tenure with the Avalanche ended when he was traded along with Shane O'Brien to the Calgary Flames in exchange for Alex Tanguay and Cory Sarich.

In 2013-14, his first year with the Flames, Jones enjoyed modest success. He started out the year strong, scoring the Flames' first goal of the season (assisted by rookie Sean Monahan for his first NHL point) and recording four points in his first four games, but he was quickly injured and then injured again, missing 34 games over the course of the season. However, when in the lineup, Jones was generally effective, recording 9 goals and 8 assists for 17 points in 48 games.

Jones drastically improved in 2014-15 and started to finally live up to his $4 million salary. Though he missed some time early in the season after being injured in the season opener against the Edmonton Oilers, Jones returned firing at full cylinders. He enjoyed a three-game goal-scoring streak in November 2014 and recorded nine goals and twenty points in his first 41 games of the season. Jones ended up with 14 goals and 16 assists in 67 games, his best totals since the 2011–12 season, as the Flames qualified for the postseason for the first time since 2009.

In the playoffs, Jones found another gear, forming a thunderously effective line with Matt Stajan and Micheal Ferland. He scored his first career playoff goal in Game 1 of the Flames' quarter-final series against the Vancouver Canucks, tying the game at 1 midway through the third period. Jones also recorded three assists in the deciding sixth game of the series at the Scotiabank Saddledome, which the Flames won by a score of 7–4. Though the Flames lost in five games in the second round to the Anaheim Ducks, Jones finished the playoffs having recorded 2 goals and 3 assists in 11 games, along with 36 hits.

In the final year of his contract, Jones lost a step in 2015-16. He only recorded three points (all goals) in his first fifteen games of the season, but heated up somewhat entering the back-half of November. On November 17, 2015, Jones recorded his 100th career goal, the game-winner in a 3–2 game against the New Jersey Devils. On February 17, 2016, Jones recorded an odd goal against the Minnesota Wild. He received a drop-pass from Matt Stajan in the slot, and shot the puck towards the net; however, it deflected off a stick, off of the face of Wild defenseman Matt Dumba and into the net. The goal was Jones' last as a member of the Calgary Flames, as twelve days later, on February 29, 2016, he was traded at the deadline to the Minnesota Wild in exchange for goaltender Niklas Backstrom and a 6th-round pick (Matthew Phillips).

=== Minnesota Wild ===
Jones missed some time immediately after the trade with a work visa issue, but quickly was inserted into the Minnesota lineup on the top line alongside Mikael Granlund and Thomas Vanek in time for a game against the Toronto Maple Leafs on March 3, 2016. He scored his first goal with the team on March 5, a 3–2 shootout win over the Buffalo Sabres; however, he only scored one more goal in his remaining 14 regular season games with the Wild. In total, Jones scored 2 goals and 1 assist in 16 games with Minnesota, bringing his total to 11 goals and 7 assists for the 2015–16 season. The Wild qualified for the playoffs, and Jones recorded a single point (an assist) en route to a six-game defeat at the hands of the Dallas Stars.

=== Anaheim Ducks and free agency ===
An unrestricted free agent following the 2015–16 season from the Wild, Jones was not signed to an NHL deal in the offseason; instead, he settled for a professional tryout with the Anaheim Ducks, signed on September 23, 2016. He failed to make the team, however, and was released ten days later. Jones did not play professional hockey in 2016–17. He had a deal with the Penguins on March 1st 2017 but it fell through.

== Career statistics ==
			Regular season					Playoffs
Season	Team	League	GP	G	A	Pts	PIM	GP	G	A	Pts	PIM
2000–01	Port Coquitlam Buckaroos	PIJHL	40	18	11	29	33	—	—	—	—	—
2001–02	Coquitlam Express	BCHL	59	19	32	51	62	—	—	—	—	—
2002–03	Coquitlam Express	BCHL	35	9	19	28	55	7	2	6	8	8
2003–04	Coquitlam Express	BCHL	53	33	60	93	78	7	3	6	9	4
2004–05	Dartmouth College	ECAC	34	9	5	14	26	—	—	—	—	—
2005–06	Dartmouth College	ECAC	33	17	17	34	38	—	—	—	—	—
2006–07	Dartmouth College	ECAC	33	18	26	44	22	—	—	—	—	—
2007–08	Lake Erie Monsters	AHL	45	14	16	30	16	—	—	—	—	—
2007–08	Colorado Avalanche	NHL	27	2	4	6	8	10	0	1	1	6
2008–09	Colorado Avalanche	NHL	40	8	5	13	8	—	—	—	—	—
2009–10	Colorado Avalanche	NHL	23	10	6	16	2	—	—	—	—	—
2010–11	Colorado Avalanche	NHL	77	27	18	45	28	—	—	—	—	—
2011–12	Colorado Avalanche	NHL	72	20	17	37	32	—	—	—	—	—
2012–13	Colorado Avalanche	NHL	33	3	6	9	6	—	—	—	—	—
2013–14	Calgary Flames	NHL	48	9	8	17	10	—	—	—	—	—
2014–15	Calgary Flames	NHL	67	14	16	30	18	11	2	3	5	2
2015–16	Calgary Flames	NHL	59	9	6	15	10	—	—	—	—	—
2015–16	Minnesota Wild	NHL	16	2	1	3	0	6	0	1	1	0
NHL totals			462	104	87	191	122	27	2	5	7	8

== Awards and honours ==
Award	Year
BCHL
First All-Star Team	2003–04
College
All-ECAC Hockey Second team	2005–06
All-ECAC Hockey First Team	2006–07
Ivy League Player of the Year	2006–07
AHCA East First-Team All-American	2006–07
