= Hugh Jessiman =

American ice hockey player (born 1984)

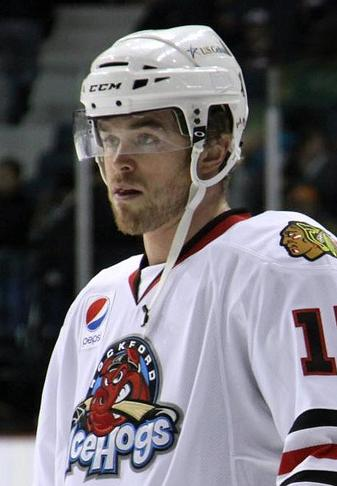
- Born: March 28, 1984 (age 42) New York City, U.S.
- Height: 6 ft 6 in (198 cm)
- Weight: 224 lb (102 kg; 16 st 0 lb)
- Position: Right wing
- Shot: Right
- Played for: Florida Panthers; KHL Medveščak Zagreb; Vienna Capitals
- NHL draft: 12th overall, 2003; New York Rangers
- Playing career: 2005–2015

Hugh S. Jessiman (born March 28, 1984) is an American former professional ice hockey right winger. Drafted by the New York Rangers of the National Hockey League (NHL) in the first round, 12th overall, of the 2003 NHL entry draft, Jessiman played in two NHL games with the Florida Panthers, but spent the majority of his professional career in the American Hockey League (AHL).

== Playing career ==
Jessiman grew up in Darien, Connecticut, attending Brunswick School in Greenwich. As a youth, he played in the 1998 Quebec International Pee-Wee Hockey Tournament with the New Jersey Devils minor ice hockey team. Jessiman was drafted in the first round, 12th overall, by the New York Rangers in the 2003 NHL entry draft, which in turn made him the first New York City-born player to be drafted by the Rangers.

After failing to meet the expectations of a first-round draft pick, on October 30, 2008, Jessiman was traded to the Nashville Predators in exchange for future considerations.

On August 4, 2010, Jessiman signed a one-year contract with the Chicago Blackhawks for the 2010–11 season. After attending the Blackhawks' training camp, on September 27, 2010, he was waived by the team and assigned to their American Hockey League (AHL) affiliate, the Rockford IceHogs.

Jessiman contributed 5 points in 25 games with the IceHogs before he was traded to the Florida Panthers (along with Jack Skille and David Pacan) in exchange for Michael Frolík and Alexander Salák on February 9, 2011. On February 27, 2011, Jessiman made his long-awaited NHL debut when Florida was defeated by the New Jersey Devils, 2–1.

The following season, Jessiman was unable to secure an NHL contract, instead signing a professional try-out contract with the Lake Erie Monsters of the AHL to begin the 2011–12 season. In 43 games with the Monsters, he matched his AHL career-highs of 20 goals before he was signed to a standard player contract for the remainder of the season with the Abbotsford Heat on February 13, 2012.

On July 3, 2012, Jessiman signed a one-year, two-way contract with the Ottawa Senators. However, due to the 2012–13 NHL lockout, he was assigned directly to Ottawa's AHL affiliate, the Binghamton Senators. Over the duration of the 2012–13 season, he failed to recapture his previous season production, finishing with 10 goals in 68 games for Binghamton.

On May 23, 2013, Jessiman signed his first contract abroad on a one-year deal with debut Kontinental Hockey League (KHL) team KHL Medveščak Zagreb of Croatia. In the 2013–14 season, he was unable to show an offensive touch but found his place using physicality on the third line with Zagreb, scoring 8 goals and 11 points in 37 games.

As free agent, on July 7, 2014, Jessiman continued his journeyman career after signing a one-year contract with the Vienna Capitals of the Austrian Hockey League (EBEL).

== Career statistics ==
| | | | Regular season | | | | | Playoffs |
| Season | Team | League | GP | G | A | Pts | PIM | GP | G | A | Pts | PIM |
|---|---|---|---|---|---|---|---|---|---|---|---|---|
| 2001–02 | Brunswick School | HS-Prep | 18 | 25 | 27 | 52 | 40 | — | — | — | — | — |
| 2002–03 | Dartmouth College | ECAC | 34 | 23 | 24 | 47 | 48 | — | — | — | — | — |
| 2003–04 | Dartmouth College | ECAC | 34 | 16 | 17 | 33 | 71 | — | — | — | — | — |
| 2004–05 | Dartmouth College | ECAC | 12 | 1 | 1 | 2 | 18 | — | — | — | — | — |
| 2005–06 | Charlotte Checkers | ECHL | 25 | 13 | 10 | 23 | 56 | — | — | — | — | — |
| 2005–06 | Hartford Wolf Pack | AHL | 46 | 7 | 11 | 18 | 66 | 2 | 0 | 0 | 0 | 0 |
| 2006–07 | Charlotte Checkers | ECHL | 20 | 12 | 10 | 22 | 52 | — | — | — | — | — |
| 2006–07 | Hartford Wolf Pack | AHL | 49 | 7 | 6 | 13 | 79 | 7 | 1 | 0 | 1 | 9 |
| 2007–08 | Hartford Wolf Pack | AHL | 71 | 18 | 24 | 42 | 154 | 5 | 0 | 1 | 1 | 21 |
| 2008–09 | Hartford Wolf Pack | AHL | 6 | 0 | 0 | 0 | 2 | — | — | — | — | — |
| 2008–09 | Milwaukee Admirals | AHL | 63 | 20 | 7 | 27 | 100 | 10 | 2 | 0 | 2 | 10 |
| 2009–10 | Milwaukee Admirals | AHL | 78 | 20 | 22 | 42 | 111 | — | — | — | — | — |
| 2010–11 | Rockford IceHogs | AHL | 25 | 3 | 2 | 5 | 27 | — | — | — | — | — |
| 2010–11 | Florida Panthers | NHL | 2 | 0 | 0 | 0 | 5 | — | — | — | — | — |
| 2010–11 | Rochester Americans | AHL | 25 | 5 | 3 | 8 | 47 | — | — | — | — | — |
| 2011–12 | Lake Erie Monsters | AHL | 43 | 20 | 5 | 25 | 75 | — | — | — | — | — |
| 2011–12 | Abbotsford Heat | AHL | 24 | 7 | 12 | 19 | 33 | 8 | 2 | 3 | 5 | 6 |
| 2012–13 | Binghamton Senators | AHL | 68 | 10 | 19 | 29 | 155 | 3 | 0 | 0 | 0 | 8 |
| 2013–14 | KHL Medveščak Zagreb | KHL | 37 | 8 | 3 | 11 | 72 | 4 | 0 | 0 | 0 | 2 |
| 2014–15 | Vienna Capitals | EBEL | 7 | 2 | 2 | 4 | 4 | — | — | — | — | — |
| AHL totals | | | 498 | 117 | 111 | 228 | 849 | 35 | 5 | 4 | 9 | 54 |
| NHL totals | | | 2 | 0 | 0 | 0 | 5 | — | — | — | — | — |

== Awards and honors ==
| Award | Year |
|---|---|
College
| All-ECAC Hockey Rookie Team | 2002–03 |
| All-ECAC Hockey Second Team | 2003–04 |

Awards and achievements
| Preceded by Chris Higgins | ECAC Hockey Rookie of the Year; 2002–03 | Succeeded by Brian Ihnacak; David McKee |
| Preceded by Dan Blackburn | New York Rangers first-round draft pick 2003 | Succeeded by Al Montoya |
