= George Pulliam =

American ice hockey player

- Born: 1923 Cranston, Rhode Island, US
- Died: 1956 (aged 32–33)
- Weight: 190 lb (86 kg; 13 st 8 lb)
- Position: Defence
- Played for: Dartmouth
- Playing career: 1945–1948

George Pulliam was an American ice hockey defenceman who played for Dartmouth just after World War II.

== Career ==
Pulliam graduated from Cranston High School. In 1947 he helped Dartmouth capture the Thompson Trophy for the Intercollegiate championship, awarded to the best college team in North America.

== Awards and honors ==
Award	Year
AHCA Second Team All-American	1947–48
