= Dartmouth Big Green men's ice hockey =

College ice hockey program

- Current season
- University: Dartmouth College
- Conference: ECAC Hockey
- First season: 1905–06
- Head coach: Reid Cashman; 5th season, 43–69–12 (.395)
- Assistant coaches: Jason Tapp; Brian Fahey; Byron Pool
- Arena: Thompson Arena; Hanover, New Hampshire
- Colors: Dartmouth green and white

NCAA tournament runner-up
- 1948, 1949

NCAA tournament Frozen Four
- 1948, 1949, 1979, 1980

NCAA tournament appearances
- 1948, 1949, 1979, 1980, 2026

Conference tournament champions
- Pentagonal League: 1947, 1949; ECAC: 2026

Conference regular season champions
- Pentagonal League: 1934, 1938, 1939, 1942, 1943, 1947, 1948, 1949; ECAC: 2006

Current uniform

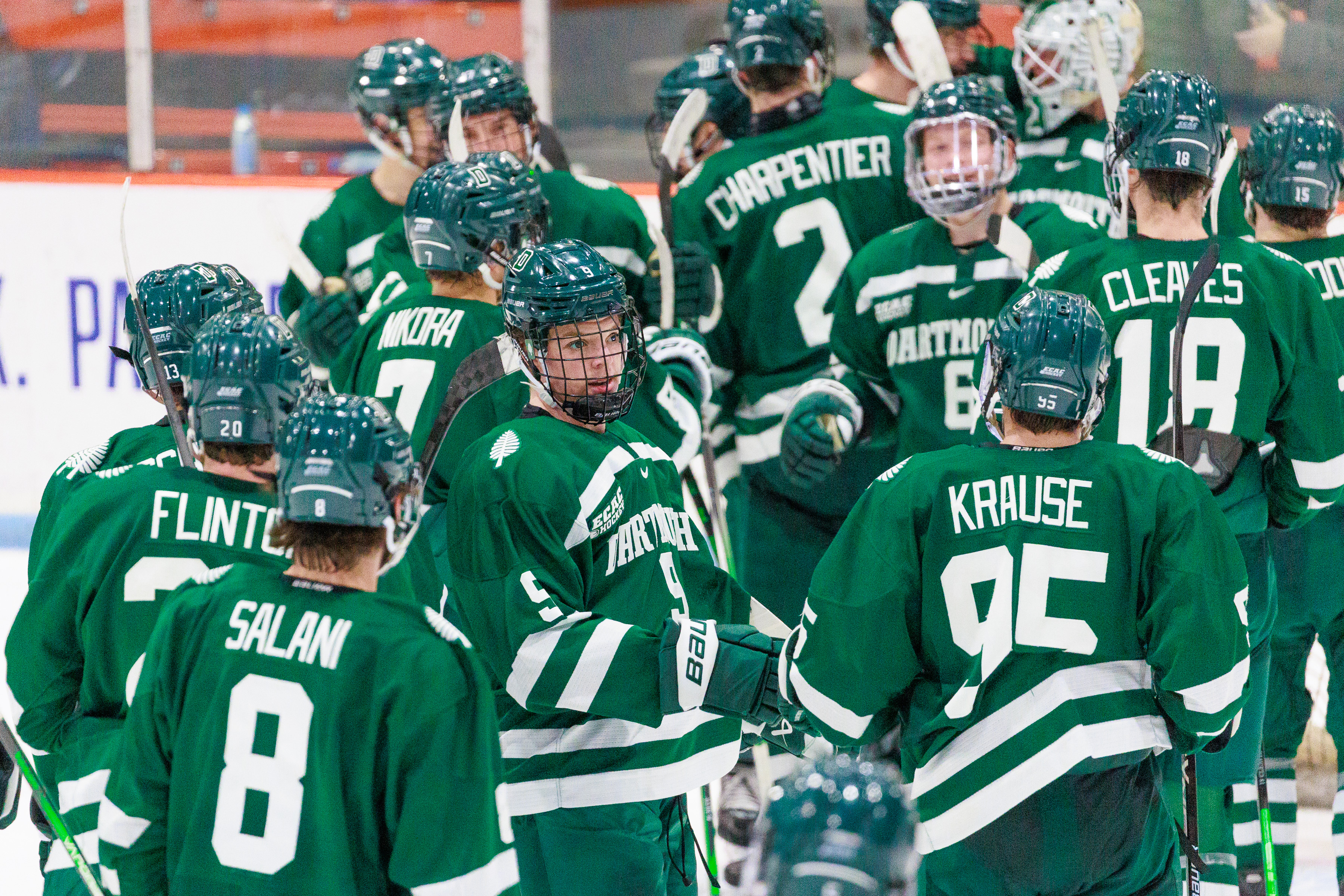
Big Green in 2024

The Dartmouth Big Green men's ice hockey team is a National Collegiate Athletic Association (NCAA) Division I college ice hockey program that represents Dartmouth College. The Big Green are a member of ECAC Hockey. They are the reigning ECAC tournament champions. They play at the Thompson Arena in Hanover, New Hampshire. The Big Green have reached the NCAA Division I men's ice hockey tournament five times in school history, and they finished as the finalist in the first two NCAA tournaments held for hockey in 1948 and 1949. They are one of 22 schools to have reached the Frozen Four four times.

== History ==
=== Early years ===
Dartmouth College fielded their first ice hockey team in January 1906, winning their first game 4–3. The team played an expanded schedule the next two years but after a 1–5–1 finish in 1908 the program hired its first head coach and promptly posted a 10–3–1 record. The ice hockey club would bring in a new bench boss each year until 1912 when Fred Rocque stayed for three seasons followed by Clarence Wanamaker with four. Dartmouth was able to win more than they lost during this time despite the coaching turnover and the lack of local facilities. The team played precious few games at home, hosting a total of 16 over 13 seasons. In 1918 the university decided to suspend the program as a result of the ongoing first World War but returned in January 1920 and had continued unabated ever since. The same year the team increased its number of home games by beginning to play on Occom Pond but despite this Wanamaker would leave after the year and the coaching carousel began anew with three more coaches over 6 years. J. Philip Bower settled the program with his 7-year stint and while the first on-campus rink was built in 1929 the team started losing and Bower was out after 1933. After 4 years of Herbert Gill the Indians were able to finally find their man in Eddie Jeremiah.

=== Jeremiah Years ===
Jeremiah, a three-time letterman for the Indians, got his career started with a bang, producing an 18–4 mark in his first year, breaking the team record for wins and post the second-best winning percentage. The team would continue to play well under their new coach, earning winning records each year until they dominated the college hockey landscape in 1941–42, going 21–2, setting a host of team records and being named as the national collegiate champion. Jeremiah would leave after the championship to serve in the military for the duration of World War II but the team continued to play well in his absence. Dartmouth was one of the few programs that played through the duration of the war and over the next three seasons the team did not lose a single game. Utilizing three coaches (two of them serving jointly) the program went 26–0–1 and sported future Hall of Fame members Dick Rondeau, Charlie Holt and Bill Riley. Jeremiah returned for the team's 1945–46 season and did not appear to have missed a step, posting two tremendous years before the first NCAA tournament was announced for 1948. The Indians continued to trounce their competition, going 20–2 during the season and with the best record in the nation they were the first team selected from the east. With Riley brothers Bill and Joe leading the attack Dartmouth rolled over tournament host Colorado College 8–4 and met Michigan in the final. The Wolverines took a one-goal lead twice in the opening frame but the Indians were able to match them both times. The roles reversed in the second period with Dartmouth briefly pulling ahead but entering the final period the score was tied 4–4. The Indians faltered in the third, allowing 4 Michigan goals and lost the game 8–4. Despite the disappointment Joe Riley was named the most outstanding player in the tournament

The next season Bill Riley led the nation in scoring, posting 41 assists and 78 points, setting season- and career-best marks for Dartmouth while his brother tied the team record for goals in one season with 45. Dartmouth slipped a bit in the standings, finishing 16–5 during the season but they returned to the tournament along with the same three teams from the year before. The Indians were given a change to avenge their loss from the year before and took advantage by dropping the powerhouse Wolverines 4–2 and reached their second championship game. Over the course of the season Boston College had lost only one game and that was to Dartmouth. The Indians played the Eagles close, taking a 2–1 lead into the second period after Bill Riley scored with less than a minute remaining in the first. BC responded with two quick goals in the second and the held the Indians off the board until the third. Shortly after Alan Kerivan tied the game the Eagles got their fourth goals of the night and held on to win the game. Once again, despite losing the championship, a Dartmouth player was named as tournament MOP, this time the award went to Dick Desmond, another future member of the US hockey hall of fame as well as a silver medalist at the 1952 Winter Olympics.

After two consecutive runs in the NCAA tournament Dartmouth sharply declined. The team spent the next decade posting middling-to-bad records but this did not prevent Jeremiah from receiving the first Spencer Penrose Award in 1951. The Indians posted a good record in 1959, going 17–8 but were edged out for the NCAA tournament by teams with better records. The following year Dartmouth had the best winning percentage of any eastern team (.725) and were one of four eastern teams selected for two play-in games (the only time this happened in NCAA tournament history) where they lost to Boston University and them promptly declined in the succeeding years.

Two years later Dartmouth was one of 28 teams that founded ECAC Hockey but the change did little to improve their fortunes. Jeremiah took the 1964 season off and his assistant Abner Oakes took over, leading the team to a 14–7 record, good enough for 6th in the conference but were snubbed by the ECAC selection committee and left out of the 8-team tournament. Once Jeremiah returned and the weakest dozen teams were removed from the conference, Dartmouth posted another good record, finishing 14–9 and this time they were invited to the ECAC tournament but lost to eventual champion BC in the quarterfinals. Over the next two seasons the Indians won only 9 games but Jeremiah was award the Spencer Penrose Award for the second time in 1967. After that year Jeremiah resigned as head coach due to ill health and then died from cancer three months later.

=== Return to the NCAA Tournament ===
Oakes coached the team for three years after Jeremiah's departure before turning the program over to Grant Standbrook. The Indians were able to produce three good years under Standbrook and made their second ECAC tournament in 1974 but again could not get out of the quarterfinals. That year the university changed the team nickname to the Big Green after several years of pressure to move away from their unofficial 'Indians' moniker. Standbrook would coach one more season, ending on a sour note, before Dartmouth moved on to George Crowe. The Big Green opened the season with their new head coach in a new home building, the Rupert C. Thompson Arena. In their new digs the Big Green improved markedly, rising to 16 wins in Crow's first year and returned to the ECAC tournament. After two modest seasons, one in which the team began sponsoring a holiday tournament, the Auld Lang Syne Classic, Dartmouth rose to 4th in the conference and won 19 games for the first time since 1948 and made their first ECAC championship game. Though the team lost the conference title tilt they were given the second eastern seed and returned to the tournament for the first time in 30 years. Dartmouth opened against the WCHA champion North Dakota and lost a close game to the western champion 4–2 ben then redeemed themselves slightly with a consolation game victory. The following year the ECAC split their conference into three divisions and Dartmouth became the first Ivy Region champion. The Big Green rode their division title back to the ECAC title match, losing to fellow Ivy team Cornell and getting the second eastern seed for the second consecutive year. Dartmouth found themselves in a rematch with the Fighting Sioux but the results were much the same with North Dakota winning 4–1. Once more Crowe's team won the consolation match to at least get something out of their tournament appearance but after 1980 the Big Green slid down the standings.

=== Decline to the bottom ===
Crowe coached Dartmouth for four more years and could not post a winning record. Brian Mason was brought in 1984, fresh off of two fantastic years with Division II RIT, but he could not replicate his success at the Division I level. In six seasons Mason's teams topped out at 10 wins and finished with losing records every year. They never finished better than 9th in the 12-team conference (after several former members left in 1984 to form Hockey East) and consequently never made an appearance in the ECAC tournament. Mason was fired in 1990 and his assistant Jeff Kosak was hired but after 10 days he resigned, citing 'personal and family reasons'. Dartmouth was eventually able to get Ben Smith to serve as head coach for the 1990–91 season but after posting a program-worst 1–24–3 record he left to take over at Northeastern. Smith's replacement, Roger Demment, was able to improve the team's record but not by much. Over the next six seasons Dartmouth remained below .500 but was able to make the ECAC tournament twice, through they lost both games they played.

=== Gaudet Years ===
In 1997 Dartmouth hired Bob Gaudet away from Brown, giving the program the first Dartmouth alumnus to helm the team since Oakes in 1970. The first three years under the new bench boss were much of the same but in Gaudet's fourth season the Big Green finally posted a winning season and won an ECAC tournament game both for the first time since 1980, ending a 21-year period of futility. The Big Green would record winning seasons over seven straight campaigns, twice winning 20 games (for the first time since 1948) and shared the ECAC regular season title in 2005–06, their first conference title in team history. Despite the championship Dartmouth was left out of the NCAA tournament after losing to Harvard in the ECAC semifinal with a 10–1 debacle. Dartmouth continued to play well under Gaudet who became the team's all-time leader in victories in 2018, but the Big Green did not win a conference semifinal game during his tenure nor made an NCAA tournament appearance since 1980.

=== Reid Cashman ===
On April 24, 2020, Bob Gaudet announced his retirement. His replacement, Reid Cashman, was named Big Green coach on June 1, 2020. Jason Tapp was added as new Associate head coach on June 23, and assistant coach Stavros Paskaris was added to the staff on July 6. Paskaris' stay was brief, as he left for Bowling Green in May, 2021. Troy Thibodeau joined the Big Green coaching staff from the USHL's Tri City Storm in June, 2021.

=== Championships ===
Dartmouth won its first ECAC tournament championship on Saturday, March 21, 2026, defeating Princeton 2-1 in overtime. Sophomore Tim Busconi scored the winning goal. Junior goalie Emmett Croteau was crowned MVP.

The team won the ECAC regular season crown in 2006 and the Ivy League title 15 times (1934, 1943, 1943, 1944, 1945, 1946, 1957, 1948, 1949, 1959, 1960, 1964, 1979, 1980 & 2007).

== Season-by-season results ==
Source:

== Coaches ==
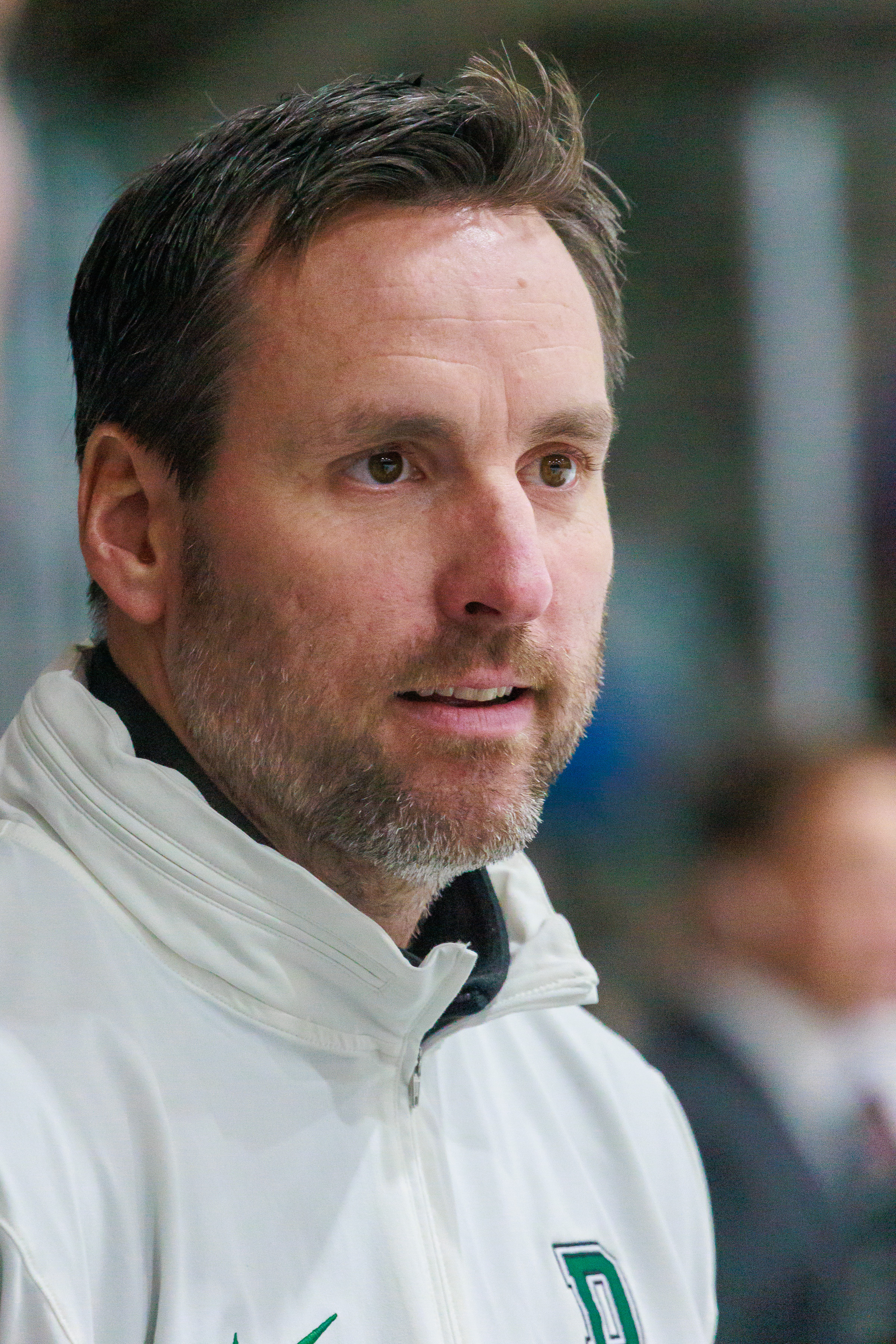
Head coach Reid Cashman

As of the end of the 2024–25 season

Tenure	Coach	Years	Record	Pct.
1905–1908	No Coach	3	7–8–1	.469
1908–1909	John Eames	1	10–3–1	.750
1909–1910	Tom Hodge	1	1–7–0	.125
1910–1911	Ray Vye	1	5–6–0	.455
1911–1912	W. Rawley	1	0–5–0	.000
1912–1915	Fred Rocque	3	19–7–0	.731
1915–1918, 1919–1920	Clarence Wanamaker	4	21–16–0	.568
1920–1921, 1922–1924	Leon Tuck	3	26–11–3	.688
1921–1922	Chippy Gaw	1	4–1–1	.750
1924–1926	Harry Denesha	2	16–6–1	.717
1926–1933	J. Philip Bower	7	42–41–5	.506
1933–1937	Herbert Gill	4	50–34–1	.594
1937–1942, 1945–1963, 1964–1967	Eddie Jeremiah	26	300–239–11	.555
1942–1943	George T. Barclay/Dick Rondeau	1	14–0–1	.967
1943–1945	Charles Arthur	2	12–0–0	1.000
1963–1964, 1967–1970	Abner Oakes	4	34–55–2	.385
1970–1975	Grant Standbrook	5	51–65–3	.441
1975–1984	George Crowe	9	109–127–8	.463
1984–1990	Brian Mason	6	36–108–8	.263
1990–1991	Ben Smith	1	1–24–3	.089
1991–1997	Roger Demment	6	45–111–10	.301
1997–2020	Bob Gaudet	23	331–340–81	.494
2020–present	Reid Cashman	4	43–69–12	.395
Totals	21 coaches	118 seasons	1180–1284–156	.480

== Olympians ==
This is a list of Dartmouth alumni who have played on an Olympic team.

Name	Position	Dartmouth Tenure	Team	Year	Finish
Gerry Geran	Center	1915–1917	(United States) USA	1920	Silver
Leon Tuck	Forward	1911–1915	(United States) USA	1920	Silver
Doug Everett	Right Wing	1923–1926	(United States) USA	1932	Silver
Francis Spain	Center	1931–1934	(United States) USA	1936	Bronze
Jack Riley	Left Wing	1940–1942, 1946–1947	(United States) USA†	1948	DQ
Stanton Priddy	Defenseman	1940–1943	(United States) USA†	1948	DQ
Bruce Mather	Forward	1943–1947	(United States) USA†	1948	DQ
Bruce Cunliffe	Right Wing	1944–1947	(United States) USA†	1948	DQ
Ralph Warburton	Right Wing	1944–1948	(United States) USA†	1948	DQ
Joe Riley	Forward	1947–1949	(United States) USA†	1948	DQ
George Pulliam	Defenseman	1945–1948	(United States) USA‡	1948	DNP
Crawford Campbell	Defenseman	1945–1948	(United States) USA‡	1948	DNP
Arnold Oss	Defenseman	1946–1950	(United States) USA	1952	Silver
Dick Desmond	Goaltender	1947–1949	(United States) USA	1952	Silver
Clifford Harrison	Center	1947–1951	(United States) USA	1952	Silver
Carey Wilson	Center	1979–1981	Canada	1984	4th

† denotes the AHA team that played in the Olympics but was disqualified from medal contention.
‡ denoted the AAU team that marched in the opening ceremony but did not participate.

== Statistical leaders ==
=== Career points leaders ===
Player	Years	GP	G	A	Pts	PIM
Bill Riley	1942–1943, 1946–1949	71	118	110	228	
Dick Rondeau	1941–1944	40	103	73	176	
Ross Brownridge	1976–1980	105	70	96	166	
Lee Stempniak	2001–2005	135	63	88	151	
Clifford Harrison	1948–1951	62	54	84	138	
Mike Ouellette	2002–2006	136	58	80	138	
Dennis Murphy	1976–1980	113	56	80	136	
Tom Fleming	1973–1976	75	60	73	133	
William Harrison	1941–1943	37	64	64	128	
Mike Turner	1969–1972	71	48	76	124	

=== Career goaltending leaders ===
GP = Games played; Min = Minutes played; W = Wins; L = Losses; T = Ties; GA = Goals against; SO = Shutouts; SV% = Save percentage; GAA = Goals against average

Minimum 35 games

Player	Years	GP	Min	W	L	T	GA	SO	SV%	GAA
Dan Yacey	2001–2005	69	3731	28	22	10	143	4	.917	2.30
James Mello	2008–2012	64	3580	27	22	6	158	2	.914	2.65
Mike Devine	2004–2008	91	5278	47	35	7	236	6	.913	2.68
Nick Boucher	1999–2003	105	6133	50	40	11	287	3	.907	2.81
Charles Grant	2012–2016	70	4096	31	33	5	192	5	.908	2.81

Statistics current through the start of the 2023–24 season.

== Players and personnel ==
=== Current roster ===
As of August 17, 2025.

No.	Nat.	Player	Class	Pos	Height	Weight	DoB	Hometown	Previous team	NHL rights
2	(United States)	Eric Charpentier	Junior	D	6' 3" (1.91 m)	205 lb (93 kg)	2002-06-10	Silver Spring, Maryland	New Jersey Titans (NAHL)	—
4	(United States)	C. J. Foley	Junior	D	5' 11" (1.8 m)	174 lb (79 kg)	2004-02-11	Hanover, Massachusetts	Salmon Arm Silverbacks (BCHL)	—
5	(Canada)	Tucker McRae	Senior	D	6' 0" (1.83 m)	190 lb (86 kg)	2001-04-11	Calgary, Alberta	Okotoks Oilers (AJHL)	—
6	(United States)	Matt Fusco	Junior	D	5' 11" (1.8 m)	195 lb (88 kg)	2003-03-07	Westwood, Massachusetts	West Kelowna Warriors (BCHL)	—
7	(Russia)	Nikita Nikora	Junior	F	5' 10" (1.78 m)	170 lb (77 kg)	2004-01-21	St. Petersburg, Russia	Springfield Jr. Blues (NAHL)	—
8	(United States)	Austin Salani	Sophomore	F	6' 2" (1.88 m)	194 lb (88 kg)	2003-08-07	Hancock, Michigan	Austin Bruins (NAHL)	—
9	(United States)	Colin Grable	Sophomore	D	6' 1" (1.85 m)	190 lb (86 kg)	2003-01-16	Spring Lake, New Jersey	Cedar Rapids RoughRiders (USHL)	—
10	(United States)	Hayden Stavroff	Sophomore	F	5' 11" (1.8 m)	190 lb (86 kg)	2004-07-09	Dublin, Ohio	Alberni Valley Bulldogs (BCHL)	—
11	(Canada)	Nathan Morin	Freshman	F	5' 9" (1.75 m)	150 lb (68 kg)	2004-03-28	Saint-Augustin-de-Desmaures, Quebec	Chilliwack Chiefs (BCHL)	—
12	(United States)	Tim Busconi	Sophomore	D	6' 0" (1.83 m)	154 lb (70 kg)	2004-01-03	Milton, Massachusetts	Victoria Grizzlies (BCHL)	—
13	(Canada)	Joshua Schenk	Sophomore	F	6' 0" (1.83 m)	163 lb (74 kg)	2004-09-04	Whitehorse, Yukon Territory	Trail Smoke Eaters (BCHL)	—
15	(Canada)	Cam MacDonald	Senior	F	5' 9" (1.75 m)	185 lb (84 kg)	2002-03-08	Surrey, British Columbia	Vernon Vipers (BCHL)	—
18	(United States)	Hank Cleaves	Sophomore	F	6' 4" (1.93 m)	201 lb (91 kg)	2003-12-25	Riverside, Connecticut	Vernon Vipers (NAHL)	—
20	(United States)	Brock Devlin	Freshman	D	5' 10" (1.78 m)	165 lb (75 kg)	2005-05-11	Mission Viejo, California	Anchorage Wolverines (NAHL)	—
21	(United States)	Andrew Clarke	Freshman	F	5' 11" (1.8 m)	170 lb (77 kg)	2004-02-11	Creve Coeur, Missouri	Des Moines Buccaneers (USHL)	—
22	(United States)	Cooper Cleaves	Freshman	D	6' 4" (1.93 m)	205 lb (93 kg)	2006-01-05	Riverside, Connecticut	Green Bay Gamblers (USHL)	—
24	(Finland)	Oskari Vuorio	Junior	F	5' 9" (1.75 m)	175 lb (79 kg)	2004-05-06	Espoo, Finland	Jokerit U20 (U20 SM-sarja)	—
26	(United States)	Ryan Schelling	Freshman	F	6' 0" (1.83 m)	174 lb (79 kg)	2004-04-09	Airmont, New York	Langley Rivermen (BCHL)	—
27	(United States)	Tyler Grahme	Freshman	F	5' 11" (1.8 m)	185 lb (84 kg)	2004-07-11	Bloomington, Minnesota	West Kelowna Warriors (BCHL)	—
31	(United States)	Mikey Roberts	Junior	G	6' 0" (1.83 m)	175 lb (79 kg)	2002-12-25	Wilton, Connecticut	Taft School (USHS–CT)	—
32	(Canada)	Roan Clarke	Junior	G	6' 3" (1.91 m)	190 lb (86 kg)	2003-08-23	Cloverdale, British Columbia	Vernon Vipers (BCHL)	—
43	(Canada)	Owen Desilets	Junior	D	6' 1" (1.85 m)	175 lb (79 kg)	2004-02-03	Airdrie, Alberta	Alberni Valley Bulldogs (BCHL)	—
70	(Canada)	Emmett Croteau	Junior	G	6' 4" (1.93 m)	209 lb (95 kg)	2003-12-07	Bonnyville, Alberta	Clarkson (ECAC)	MTL, 162nd overall 2022
71	(Canada)	Brock Cummings	Freshman	F	6' 2" (1.88 m)	194 lb (88 kg)	2005-03-23	Mississauga, Ontario	Prince George Spruce Kings (BCHL)	—
86	(Canada)	Jack Silverberg	Sophomore	F	5' 9" (1.75 m)	201 lb (91 kg)	2004-12-01	Sherwood Park, Alberta	Okotoks Oilers (BCHL)	—
92	(United States)	Jason Stefanek	Freshman	F	5' 11" (1.8 m)	165 lb (75 kg)	2004-08-20	Yorba Linda, California	Trail Smoke Eaters (BCHL)	—
95	(United States)	Alex Krause	Senior	F	6' 1" (1.85 m)	190 lb (86 kg)	2001-07-22	Calabasas, California	Northeast Generals (NAHL)	—

== Awards and honors ==
=== United States Hockey Hall of Fame ===
- Myles Lane (1973)
- Eddie Jeremiah (1973)
- Doug Everett (1974)
- Bill Riley (1977)
- Jack Riley (1979)
- Walter Bush (1980)
- Dick Rondeau (1985)
- Dick Desmond (1988)
- Charlie Holt (1997)
- Bruce Mather (1998)
- Joe Riley (2002)

=== NCAA ===
==== Individual awards ====
Spencer Penrose Award

- Eddie Jeremiah: 1951, 1967

Derek Hines Unsung Hero Award

- Dan Shribman, F: 2007

NCAA Division I Ice Hockey Scoring Champion

- Bill Riley, LW: 1949

Tournament Most Outstanding Player

- Joe Riley, F; 1948
- Dick Desmond, G; 1949

==== All-Americans ====
First Team

- 1947-48: Bill Riley, F
- 1948-49: Dick Desmond, G; Bill Riley, F; Joe Riley, F
- 1949-50: Arnold Oss, F
- 1950-51: Clifford Harrison, F
- 1951-52: John Grocott, D
- 1959-60: Tom Wahman, G; Rusty Ingersoll, F
- 1979-80: Ross Brownridge, F
- 2003-04: Lee Stempniak, F
- 2006-07: David Jones, F

Second Team

- 1947-48: George Pulliam, D
- 1988-89: Dave Williams, D
- 2004-05: Lee Stempniak, F
- 2005-06: Mike Ouellette, F

=== ECAC Hockey ===
==== Individual awards ====
ECAC Hockey Player of the Year

- Hayden Stavroff: 2026

ECAC Hockey Rookie of the Year

- Hugh Jessiman: 2003
- Jody O'Neill: 2009
- C. J. Foley: 2024

Tim Taylor Award

- Roger Demment, 1993
- Bob Gaudet, 2006
- Reid Cashman: 2024, 2026

ECAC Hockey Best Defensive Forward

- Mike Ouellette: 2006

==== All-Conference ====
First Team All-ECAC Hockey

- 1979–80: Ross Brownridge, F
- 1988–89: Dave Williams, D
- 2001–02: Mike Maturo, F
- 2003–04: Grant Lewis, D; Lee Stempniak, F
- 2004–05: Lee Stempniak, F
- 2005–06: Mike Ouellette, F
- 2006–07: David Jones, F
- 2007–08: Nick Johnson, F
- 2023–24: Luke Haymes, F
- 2024–25: C. J. Foley, D
- 2025–26: Hayden Stavroff, F

Second Team All-ECAC Hockey

- 1961–62: Dave Leighton, F
- 1964–65: Dean Matthews, F
- 1973–74: Tom Fleming, F
- 1987–88: Steve Laurin, F
- 1992–93: Scott Fraser, F
- 2000–01: Trevor Byrne, D
- 2001–02: Trevor Byrne, D
- 2002–03: Trevor Byrne, D
- 2003–04: Hugh Jessiman, F
- 2005–06: Grant Lewis, D; David Jones, F
- 2010–11: James Mello, G
- 2012–13: Mike Keenan, D
- 2014–15: Eric Neiley, F
- 2023–24: Cooper Black, G
- 2025–26: Hank Cleaves, F

Third Team All-ECAC Hockey

- 2006–07: Ben Lovejoy, D
- 2007–08: Evan Stephens, D
- 2009–10: Evan Stephens, D
- 2010–11: Joe Stejskal, D
- 2016–17: Troy Crema, F
- 2021–22: Clay Stevenson, G
- 2023–24: C. J. Foley, D
- 2025–26: C. J. Foley, D

ECAC Hockey All-Rookie Team

- 1990–91: Mike Bracco, G; Tony DelCarmine, F; Scott Fraser, F
- 1991–92: Pat Turcotte, F
- 1992–93: Bill Kelleher, F
- 1994–95: David Whitworth, F
- 1998–99: Jamie Herrington, F
- 1999–00: Trevor Byrne, D
- 2001–02: Lee Stempniak, F
- 2002–03: Sean Offers, D; Hugh Jessiman, F
- 2003–04: Grant Lewis, D
- 2004–05: Nick Johnson, F
- 2006–07: TJ Galiardi, F
- 2007–08: Evan Stephens, D
- 2008–09: Jody O'Neill, G; Doug Jones, F
- 2021–22: Clay Stevenson, G
- 2022–23: Cooper Black, G
- 2023–24: C. J. Foley, D

=== Ivy League ===
Ivy League Player of the Year

- Ross Brownridge, F; 1980
- Mike Ouellette, D; 2006
- David Jones, RW; 2007
- Drew O'Connor, F; 2020

Ivy league Rookie of the Year

- Hugh Jessiman, F; 2003

== Big Green players in the NHL ==
As of July 1, 2025.

Player	Position	Team(s)	Years	Games	Stanley Cups
Scott Fraser	Right Wing	MTL, EDM, NYR	1995–1999	71	0
TJ Galiardi	Left Wing	COL, SJS, CGY, WPG	2008–2015	321	0
Gerry Geran	Center	MOW, BOS	1917–1926	37	0
Tanner Glass	Left Wing	FLA, VAN, WPG, PIT, NYR, CGY	2007–2018	527	0
Bob Hall	Forward	NYA	1925–1926	8	0
Eddie Jeremiah	Right Wing	BOS, NYA	1931–1932	15	0
Hugh Jessiman	Right Wing	FLA	2010–2011	2	0
Nick Johnson	Right Wing	PIT, MIN, PHO, BOS	2009–2014	113	0
David Jones	Right Wing	COL, CGY, MIN	2007–2016	462	0
Myles Lane	Defenseman	NYR, BOS	1928–1934	60	1
Grant Lewis	Defenseman	ATL	2008–2009	1	0
Matt Lindblad	Left Wing	BOS	2013–2015	4	0
Ben Lovejoy	Defenseman	PIT, ANA, NJD, DAL	2008–2019	544	1
Drew O'Connor	Left Wing	PIT, VAN	2020–Present	241	0
Lee Stempniak	Right Wing	STL, TOR, PHO, CGY, PIT, NYR, WPG, NJD, BOS, CAR	2005–2019	911	0
Clay Stevenson	Goaltender	WSH	2024–Present	1	0
David Williams	Defenseman	SJS, ANA	1991–1995	173	0
Carey Wilson	Right Wing	CGY, HFD, NYR	1984–1993	552	0
J. T. Wyman	Right Wing	MTL, TBL	2009–2013	44	0

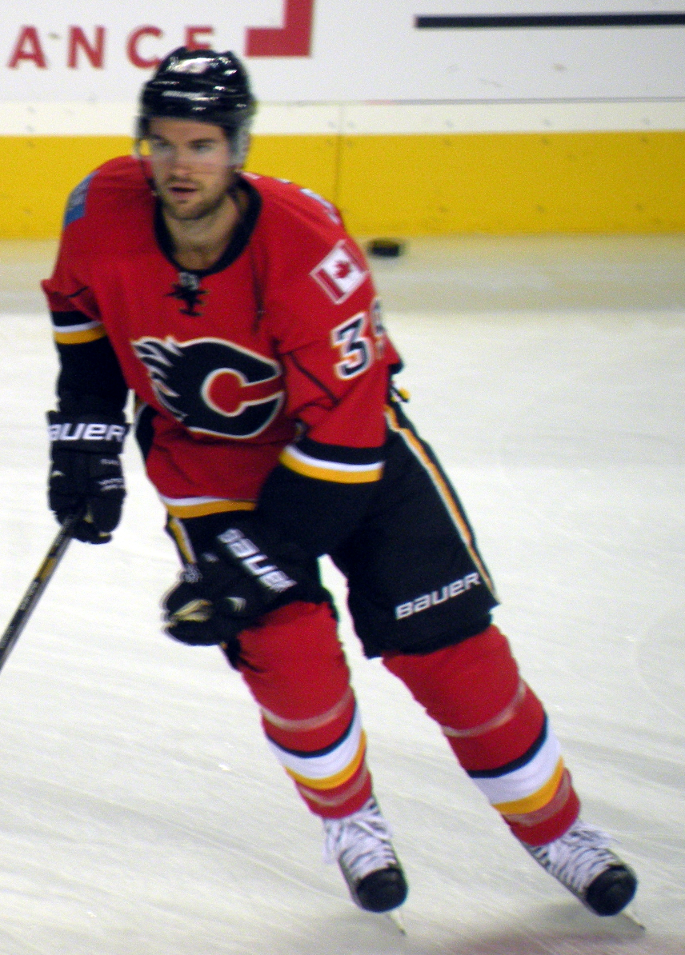
TJ Galiardi

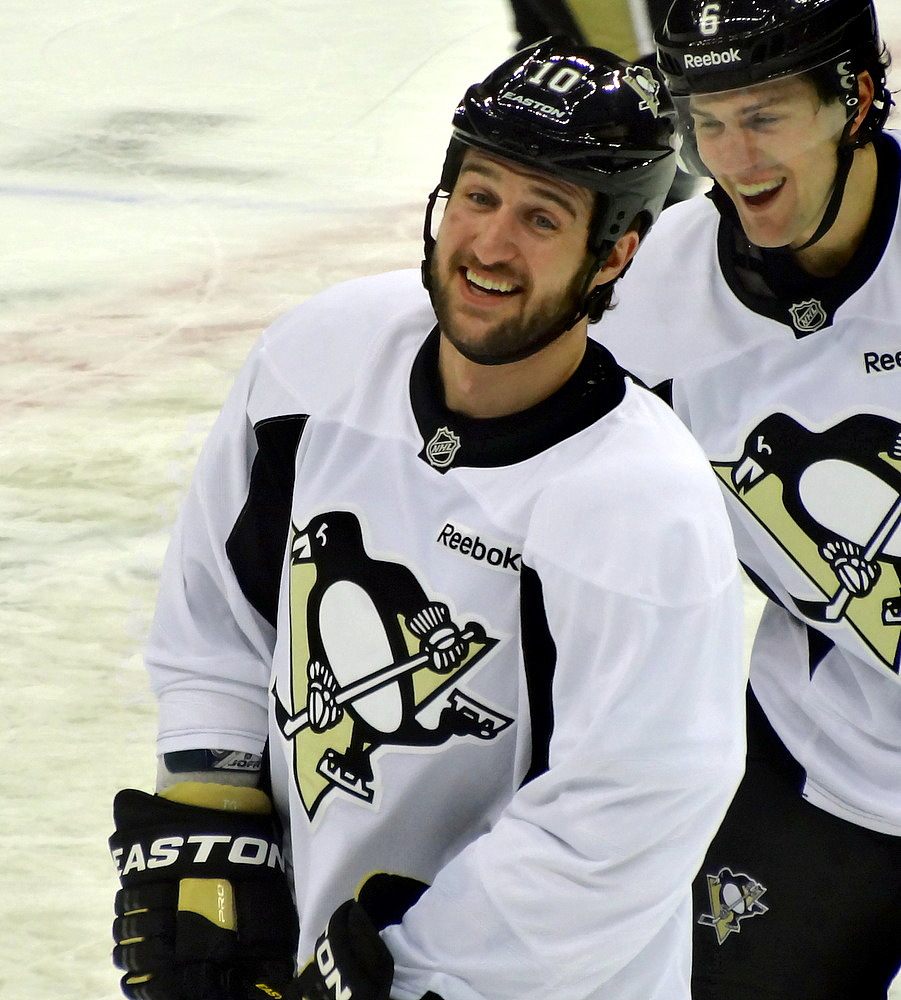
Tanner Glass

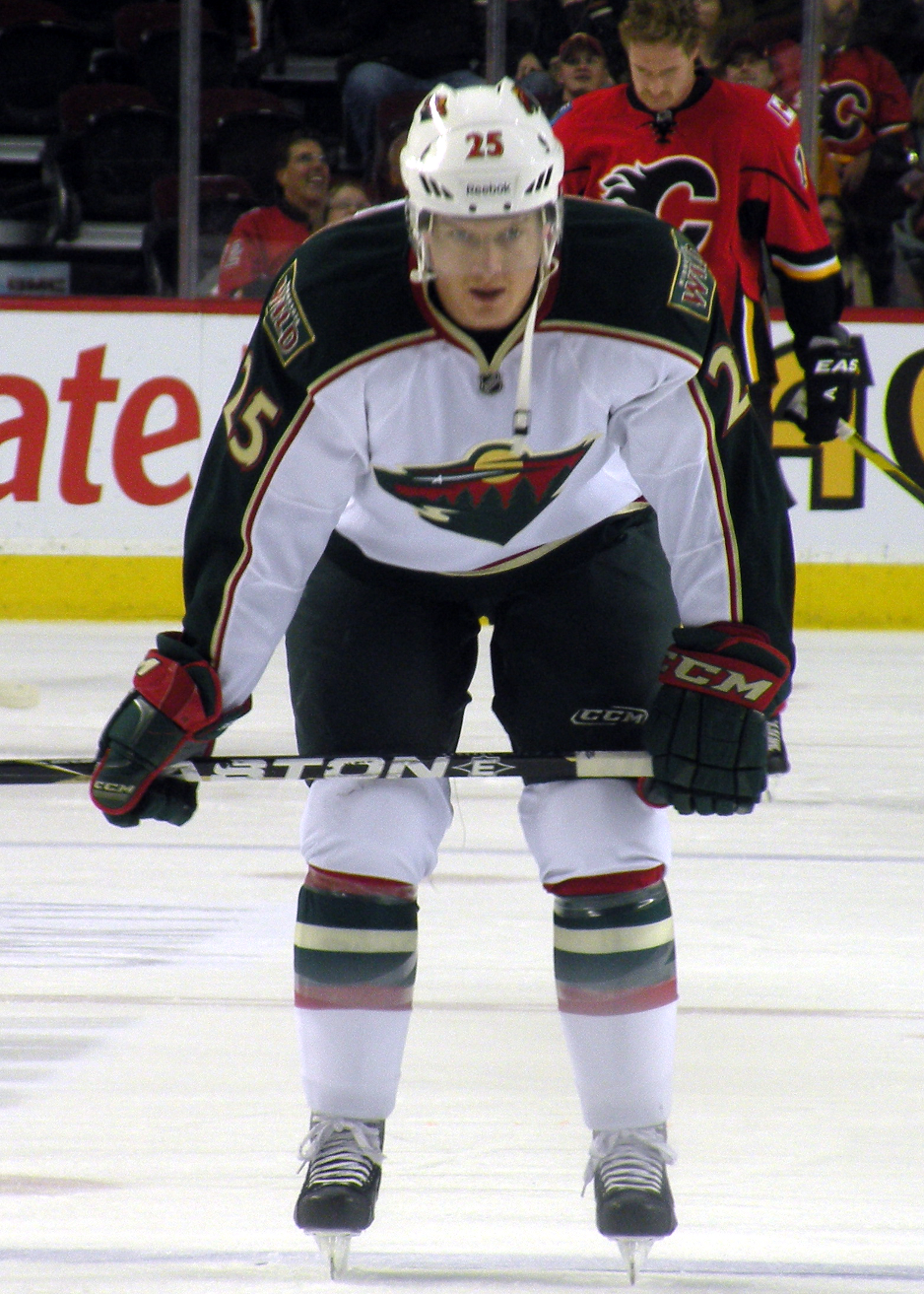
Nick Johnson

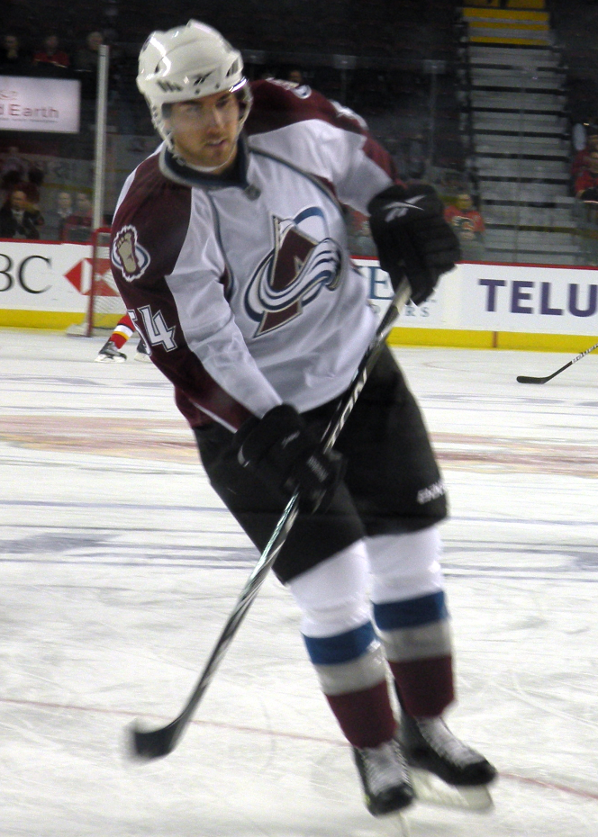
David Jones

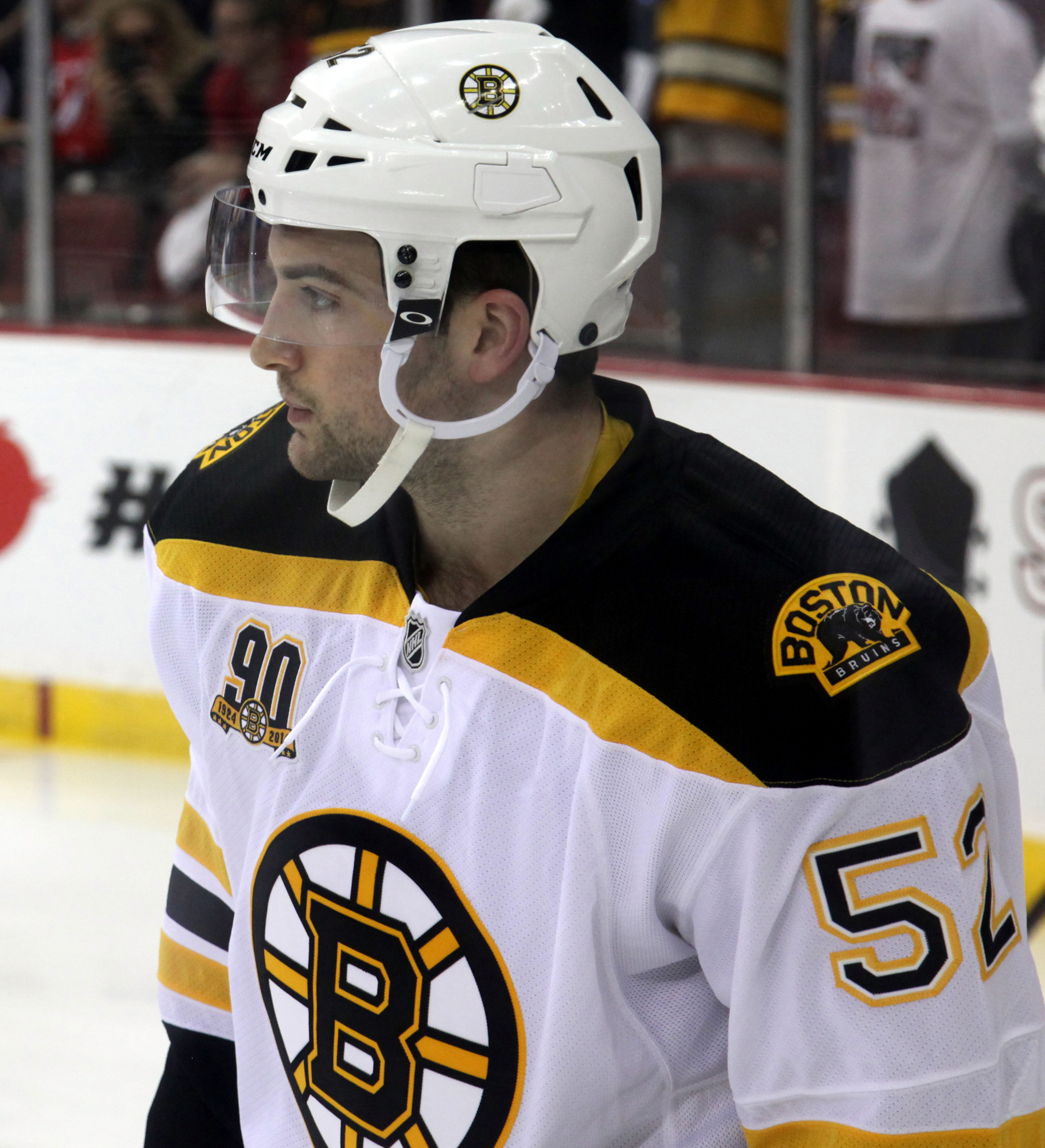
Matt Lindblad

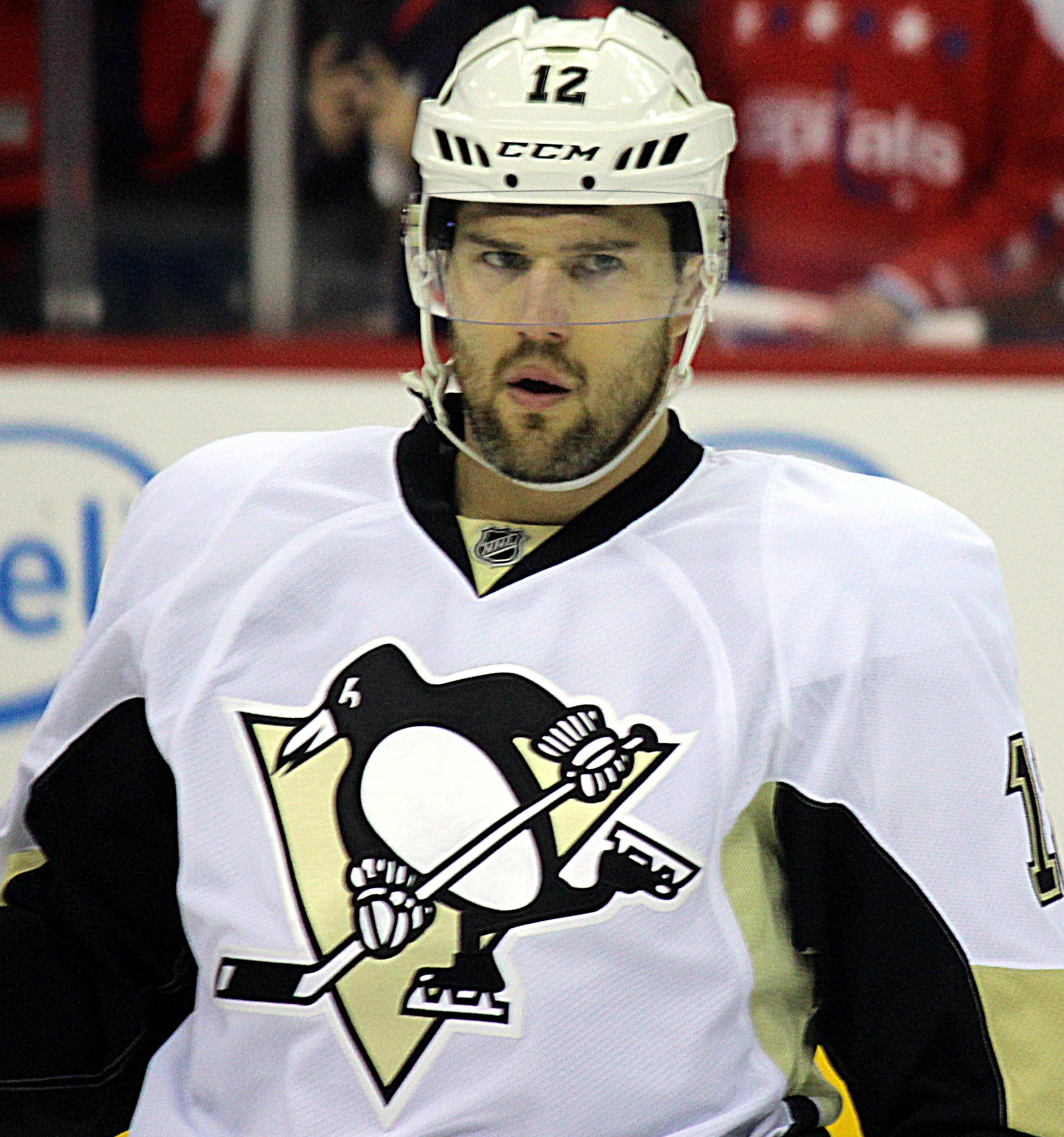
Ben Lovejoy

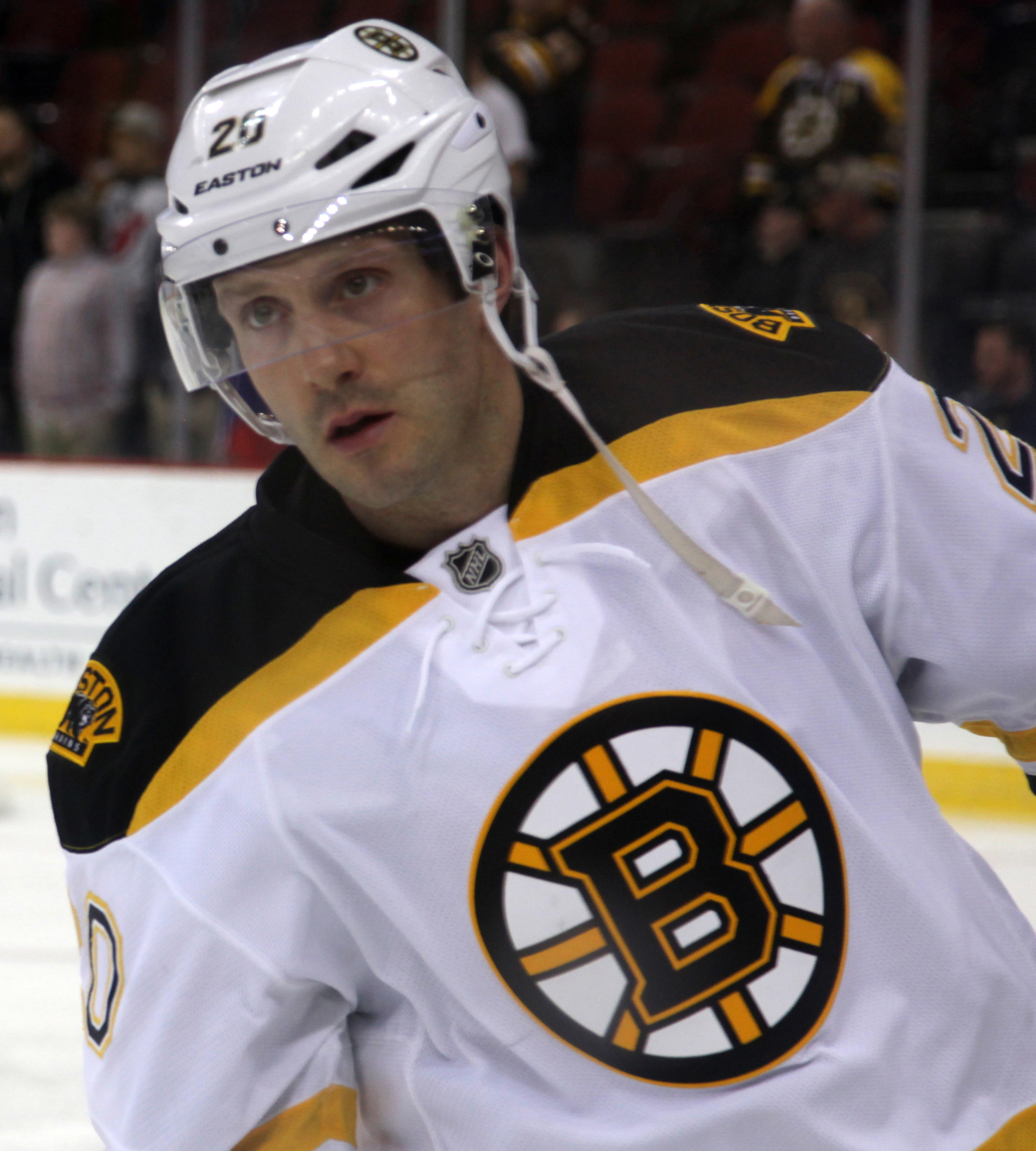
Lee Stempniak

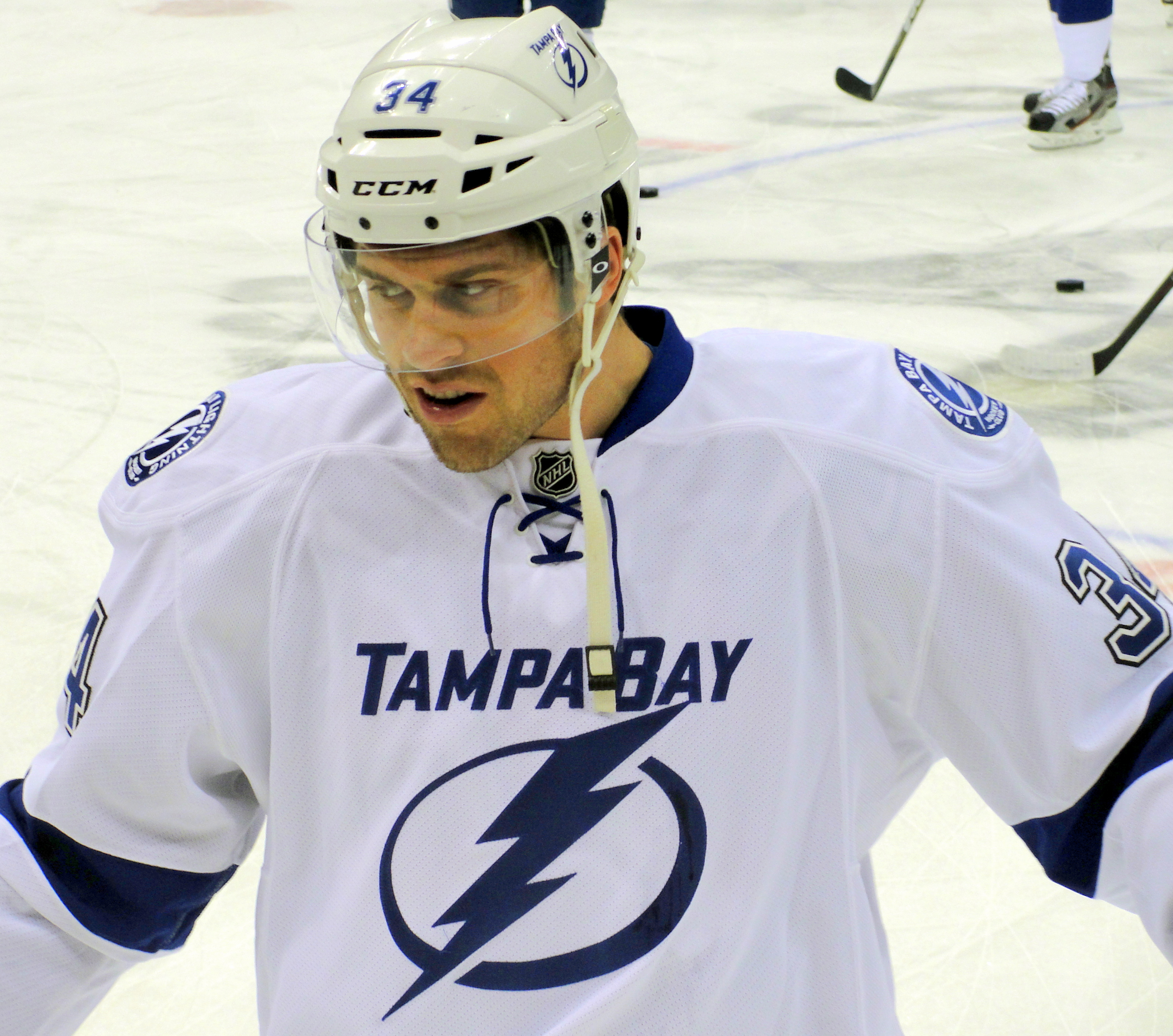
J. T. Wyman

== Other notable players ==
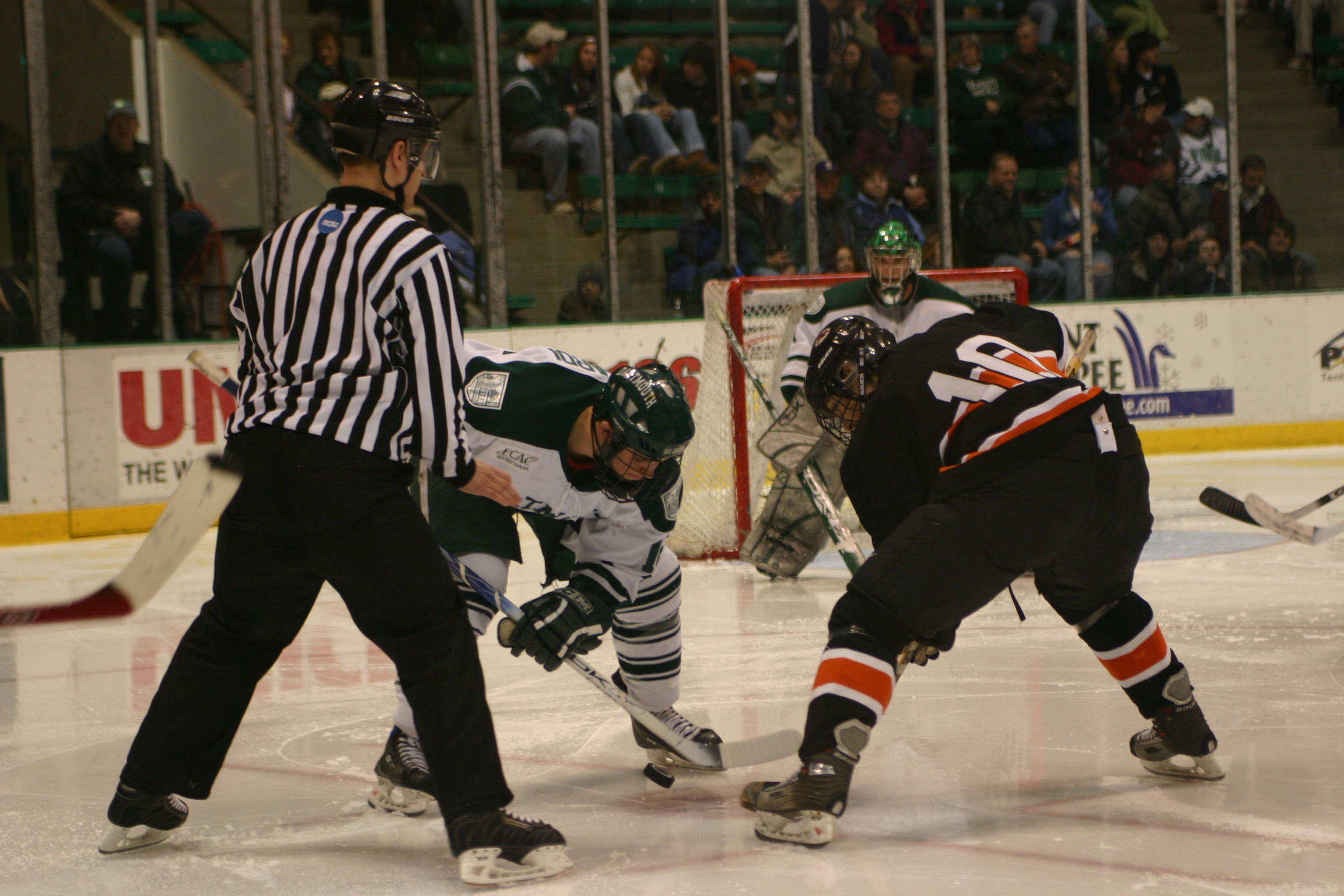
A Dartmouth hockey game against Princeton at Thompson Arena

See: Category:Dartmouth Big Green men's ice hockey players

== See also ==
- Dartmouth Big Green women's ice hockey
- New Hampshire–Dartmouth rivalry
