= Roger Demment =

American ice hockey player & coach (born 1950)

Biographical details
- Born: 1950 (age 75–76); Troy, New York, U.S.
- Education: Yale

Playing career
- 1967–1968: Trinity-Pawling School
- 1969–1972: Yale
- 1972–1975: Diables Rouges de Briançon
- 1977–1978: Diables Rouges de Briançon
- Position: Forward

Coaching career (HC unless noted)
- 1972–1975: Diables Rouges de Briançon
- 1975–1977: Trinity-Pawling School
- 1977–1981: Diables Rouges de Briançon
- 1985–1990: St. Mark's School
- 1990–1991: Dartmouth (assistant)
- 1991–1997: Dartmouth

Head coaching record
- Overall: 45-111-10 (.301)

Accomplishments and honors

Awards
- 1992–93 ECAC Coach of the Year

Roger Demment (born 1950) is an American former ice hockey coach who is currently an associate athletic director for Dartmouth College, the University he coached in the early- and mid-1990s.

== Career ==
Roger Demment was a member of the Yale's men's ice hockey team in the early 1970s. While the Bulldogs didn't have much success while Roger was there, he was named captain of the team for his senior season. After graduating, Demment headed overseas to act as a player-coach for the Briançon Red Devils of the French Division II. Demment stayed with the team for three seasons before returning to the states to take over at his high school alma mater, Trinity-Pawling School. Two years later, however, he was back in Briançon, playing for one final campaign before hanging up his skates, though he remained as coach of the Red Devils until 1981. While in France, he was also appointed as regional program director for French Ministry of Youth and Sport. Demment eventually headed back to North America to earn a Master's degree from Wisconsin in 1986. He returned to coaching high school hockey as well, leading St. Mark's School from 1985-1990 before getting his first opportunity at the college level.

In 1990, Dartmouth was wrapping up its 10th consecutive losing season and Demment agreed to come in and help new head coach Ben Smith resuscitate the program. From the start of the season, however, nothing went right; Dartmouth posted its worst ever record (1-24-3) and Smith left once it was all over for greener pastures at Northeastern. Demment decided to stay in Hanover, believing that he could return the Big Green to prominence on the ice. Predictably the returns weren't great at the start, but in his second year (despite a losing record) the Big Green made their first conference tournament in 13 years. That was the extent to which Demment could raise Dartmouth, however, and it became apparent that they needed new blood. Demment was promoted to a directorial position within the university and replaced with Bob Gaudet.

== Head coaching record ==
Record table
| Season | Team | Overall | Conference | Standing | Postseason |
|---|---|---|---|---|---|
Dartmouth Big Green (ECAC Hockey) (1991–1997)
| 1991–92 | Dartmouth | 3-21-2 | 3-17-2 | 11th | |
| 1992–93 | Dartmouth | 11-16-0 | 9-13-0 | 8th | ECAC Preliminary Round |
| 1993–94 | Dartmouth | 5-21-1 | 4-17-1 | 12th | |
| 1994–95 | Dartmouth | 9-16-2 | 7-13-2 | t-10th | |
| 1995–96 | Dartmouth | 7-20-3 | 6-14-2 | 9th | ECAC Preliminary Round |
| 1996–97 | Dartmouth | 10-17-2 | 5-15-2 | 11th | |
| Dartmouth: | | 45-111-10 | 34-89-9 | | |
| Total: | | 45-111-10 | | | |
National champion Postseason invitational champion Conference regular season champion Conference regular season and conference tournament champion Division regular season champion Division regular season and conference tournament champion Conference tournament champion
