= Herbert Gill =

American ice hockey, tennis, and baseball coach (1894–1967)

Biographical details
- Born: January 19, 1894; Boston, Massachusetts, U.S.
- Died: June 30, 1967 (aged 73); Portland, Maine, U.S.

Coaching career (HC unless noted)

Men's ice hockey
- 1921–1923: Browne & Nichols School
- 1923–1924: Pomfret School
- 1924–1927: Shady Side Academy
- 1928–1933: Choate School
- 1933–1937: Dartmouth
- 1948–1952: Milton Academy

Football
- 1921–1922: Browne & Nichols School

Baseball
- 1922–1923: Browne & Nichols School
- 1925–1927: Shady Side Academy
- 1929–1933: Choate School
- 1943: Massachusetts State
- 1959–1962: Nasson

Tennis
- 1934–1936: Dartmouth
- 1937–1939: Bennington

Head coaching record
- Overall: 50–34–1 (.594) (College hockey)

Herbert Buckler Gill (January 19, 1894 – June 30, 1967) was an American preparatory school and college sports coach who was head coach of the Dartmouth Big Green men's ice hockey team from 1933 to 1937.

== Early life ==
Gill was born in Boston on January 19, 1894. He graduated from Dorchester High School and attended the University of Michigan. He served in the United States Navy during World War I and was a member of the United States Navy Reserve afterwards.

== Coaching ==
Gill began his career in 1921 as the football, ice hockey, and baseball coach at the Browne & Nichols School. He led the hockey team to a state prep school championship in 1922. He coached hockey at the Pomfret School for one season, (1923–24), then moved to the Shady Side Academy, where he coached baseball and hockey and was the assistant athletic director. In 1927, he became the director of physical training at the Indianapolis Boys' Preparatory School. In 1928, he became the hockey and baseball coach at the Choate School. He amassed a 52–14 record as a prep school hockey coach and a 65–28 record in baseball.

On May 7, 1933, Gill was named head coach of Dartmouth College's men's ice hockey. The team won the Quadrangular League championship in Gill's first season as head coach. In 1934, he was appointed coach of the Dartmouth tennis team. On February 10, 1937, athletic director William H. McCarter announced that Gill would be leaving at the end of the school year "due to his dissatisfaction with sport conditions at Dartmouth". Gill, in a letter to The Dartmouth explained that he was leaving due to complaints from some players the team's play had suffered because Gill had driven them too hard. He had suspended some of these players for violating team rules and insubordination, but reinstated them soon after. After their return, they continued to blame him for the team's struggles, stating that his "tactics and general system of coaching was wrong in every respect". Three of Dartmouth's players, in turn, wrote a letter stating that the team had never been out to "get" Gill, but there had been misunderstandings on both sides and "things have been pretty well ironed out between the team and Mr. Gill". He finished his tenure at Dartmouth with an overall record of 50–34–1.

After leaving Dartmouth, Gill moved to Bennington College, where he coached tennis. He later worked as a tennis pro at the Chagrin Valley Hunt Club in Gates Mills, Ohio at the Hotel Deauville in Miami. In 1943, he was named head baseball coach at Massachusetts State College. Due to World War II, the team operated on an informal basis, with games being organized as the season progressed. From 1943 to 1948, Gill was a teacher at the Fessenden School. He then moved to the Milton Academy, where he once again coached hockey.

His final coaching stop was at Nasson College, where he was head baseball coach and director of the men's intramural athletic program.

== Later life and death ==
Gill retired in 1962 and resided in South Portland, Maine until his death on June 30, 1967, at the age of 73.
