= William H. McCarter =

American academic and college athletics administrator

Biographical details
- Born: 1898; Topeka, Kansas, U.S.
- Died: July 6, 1959 (age 61); Hanover, New Hampshire, U.S.

Administrative career (AD unless noted)
- 1937–1954: Dartmouth

William Hill McCarter (1898 - July 6, 1959) was an American academic and college athletics administrator. He attended Dartmouth College where he graduated in 1919. He later served as Dartmouth's athletic director from 1936 to 1954. He was also a professor of English at Dartmouth. He was the author of "Men of Dartmouth" (1954) and "The Hanover Scene" (1957).
