= Leon Tuck =

American ice hockey player

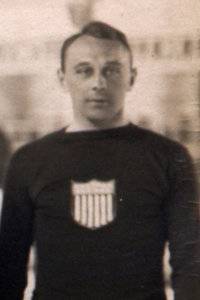
- Tuck at the 1920 Olympics.
- Born: May 25, 1891 Winchester, Massachusetts, United States
- Died: September 2, 1953 (aged 62) Boston, Massachusetts, United States
- Height: 5 ft 7 in (170 cm)
- Weight: 165 lb (75 kg; 11 st 11 lb)
- Position: Defense
- National team: United States
- Playing career: 1915–1920
Medal record
Olympic Games
Silver medal – second place	1920 Antwerp	Team

Leon Parker Tuck (May 25, 1891 – September 2, 1953) was an American ice hockey player who competed in the 1920 Summer Olympics. Born in Melrose, Massachusetts, he was a defenseman on the United States hockey team. The team competed in the 1920 Summer Olympics, winning the silver medal.

== Head coaching record ==
Record table
Season	Team	Overall	Conference	Standing	Postseason
Dartmouth Independent (1920–1921)
1920–21	Dartmouth	6–4–1			
Dartmouth:		6–4–1			
Dartmouth Independent (1922–1924)
1922–23	Dartmouth	13–2–0			
1923–24	Dartmouth	10–5–2			
Dartmouth:		23–7–2			
Total:		29–11–3			
National champion Postseason invitational champion Conference regular season champion Conference regular season and conference tournament champion Division regular season champion Division regular season and conference tournament champion Conference tournament champion
