= Ray Vye =

American ice hockey coach (1889–1964)

Biographical details
- Born: August 31, 1889; Boston, Massachusetts, U.S.
- Died: June 23, 1964 (aged 74); Seattle, Washington, U.S.

Coaching career (HC unless noted)
- 1909–1910: Amherst
- 1910–1911: Dartmouth
- 1911–1912: Amherst

William Raymond Vye (August 31, 1889 – June 23, 1964) was an American hockey coach who was the head coach at Dartmouth and Amherst Colleges.

Vye was born in Boston and grew up in Moncton, where he was a "player of wide reputation", according to the Dartmouth Alumni Magazine. He worked for the Intercolonial Railway, where he rose to the position of chief clerk of the mechanical department. In 1909, he moved to Boston, where he worked as an auto mechanic and chauffeur. That winter, he coached the Amherst men's hockey team. He then coached Dartmouth College during their 1910–11 men's ice hockey season before returning to Amherst for another season.

In 1912, Vye and Elmer Ferguson were investigated for stealing Intercolonial Railway passes from the offices of the Moncton Transcript and reselling them.

Vye moved to Vancouver, where he was a business partner of Bert Messervey, who had also been a noted athlete in Moncton. In 1918, Vye established his own business, W. R. Vye, Ldt. In 1937, he moved to Seattle, where he worked as a real estate broker. He died on June 23, 1964 of a pulmonary embolism. He had been ill with prostate cancer for the prior ten years.
