= Stan Priddy =

American ice hockey player

- Born: February 26, 1921 Brookline, MA, USA
- Died: May 12, 1996 (aged 75)
- Position: Defense
- National team: United States
- Playing career: 1947–1948

Stanton Bliss Priddy (February 26, 1921 – May 12, 1996) was an American ice hockey defenseman who competed in ice hockey at the 1948 Winter Olympics.

Priddy was a member of the American ice hockey team which played eight games but was disqualified, at the 1948 Winter Olympics hosted by St. Moritz, Switzerland.
