= Eddie Jeremiah =

American ice hockey player and coach

Edward Jeremiah

Biographical details
- Born: November 4, 1905; Worcester, Massachusetts, U.S.
- Died: June 7, 1967 (aged 61)

Playing career
- 1926–1930: Dartmouth
- 1930–1933: New Haven Eagles
- 1931–1932: New York Americans
- 1931–1932: Boston Bruins
- 1931–1932: Boston Cubs
- 1933–1934: Philadelphia Arrows
- 1934–1935: Cleveland Falcons
- Position: Right wing

Coaching career (HC unless noted)
- 1932–1935: Hebron Academy
- 1935–1937: Boston Olympics
- 1937–1942: Dartmouth
- 1945–1963: Dartmouth
- 1964–1967: Dartmouth

Head coaching record
- Overall: 308–239–11 (.562)

Accomplishments and honors

Awards
- 1951 Spencer Penrose Award; 1967 Spencer Penrose Award; 1973 US Hockey Hall of Fame; 2002 New Hampshire Legends of Hockey; 2008 Hobey Baker Legend of College Hockey Award; Hebron Academy Athletic Hall of Fame; Dartmouth College Hall of Fame

Edward John Jeremiah (Armenian: Էդդի Ժերեմիա; November 4, 1905 – June 7, 1967) was an American professional ice hockey player who played 15 games in the National Hockey League for the New York Americans and Boston Bruins during the 1931–32 season. After his playing days Jeremiah became the head coach for Dartmouth College until his retirement in 1967.

== Career ==
=== Player ===
Edward Jeremiah joined the Dartmouth Indians in 1926 after graduating from Hebron Academy, where he was also a baseball star. As was standard practice, Jeremiah sat out his freshman year before playing for a powerhouse squad that went 25–11–5 in his time on the ice. In 1930, Jeremiah played summer baseball with the Osterville town team in the Cape Cod Baseball League.

After graduating Jeremiah joined the New Haven Eagles of the Canadian-American Hockey League, a precursor to the American Hockey League, spending part of three seasons with the team. Over the course of the 1931–32 season, Jeremiah played for four separate teams: the Eagles, the Boston Cubs (another CAHL team), the New York Americans and the Boston Bruins. In his 15 combined games between the two NHL teams Jeremiah recorded only one assist. After 1933 Jeremiah bounced around between various minor league clubs before ending his playing days in 1935.

=== Coaching ===
==== Ice hockey ====
Jeremiah began his coaching career in 1932 at the Hebron Academy. From 1935 to 1937, he was the head coach of the Boston Olympics, leading them to a national amateur hockey championship in his second season.

In 1937, Jeremiah returned to Dartmouth as head coach. Taking over from Herbert Gill, Jeremiah continued Dartmouth's winning tradition by setting a then-school record 18 wins in his first campaign and posted winning records in his first ten years behind the bench. After leading the Indians to a 21–2 mark in 1941–42, Jeremiah took the next three seasons off to serve in World War II, returning to his job at Hanover after the conclusion of the war. In his absence (though he is sometimes still listed as head coach during the time), Dartmouth was undefeated for an NCAA record 46 consecutive games from 1942 to 1946 with the first 19 coming under his direction.

After resuming his head coaching duties, and continuing with Dartmouth's winning ways, the college hockey landscape began to change quickly. The NCAA instituted a tournament with the 1947–48 season and with a record of 20–3 that year Dartmouth was one of four team invited to participate. The Indians won their semifinal match against Colorado College at the 1948 NCAA Division I Men's Ice Hockey Tournament by an 8–4 score, but was unable to overcome Michigan in the championship game. All four teams returned the following year with Dartmouth avenging their loss by downing the Wolverines 4–2 in the 1949 semifinal, but were stymied once again in the title match, this time losing to Boston College 4–3.

After 1949, Dartmouth began a slow decline from its lofty perch, recording only four winning seasons over the next 12 years. Things didn't get much better after the Indians became a founding member of ECAC Hockey in 1961; except for the season he took off in 1963–64, Jeremiah recorded only one winning season before retiring in 1967, turning over the team to Abner Oakes. Despite the lack of success in the final 18 years as head coach, Jeremiah was voted the ACHA National coach-of-the-year twice, receiving the Spencer Penrose Award in 1951 and 1967. Three months after retiring, cancer claimed Jeremiah at the age of 61. The disease didn't stop the accolades as the ACHA named its Division III Coach of the Year Award in his honor. Jeremiah was inducted into the US Hockey Hall of Fame in 1973 the New Hampshire Legends of Hockey in 2002 and named as the 2008 recipient of the Hobey Baker Legend of College Hockey Award among other honors.

==== Other sports ====
In addition to his ice hockey duties, Eddie Jeremiah also spent time as the head coach for both the freshman baseball and freshman football squads at Dartmouth, even spending a few years as the head coach for the upper-class baseball team (1947–1951).

== Career statistics ==
=== Regular season and playoffs ===
			Regular season					Playoffs
Season	Team	League	GP	G	A	Pts	PIM	GP	G	A	Pts	PIM
1922–23	Somerville High School	HS-MA	—	—	—	—	—	—	—	—	—	—
1923–24	Somerville High School	HS-MA	—	—	—	—	—	—	—	—	—	—
1924–25	Somerville High School	HS-MA	—	—	—	—	—	—	—	—	—	—
1925–26	Hebron Academy	HS-ME	—	—	—	—	—	—	—	—	—	—
1926–27	Dartmouth College	NCAA	—	—	—	—	—	—	—	—	—	—
1927–28	Dartmouth College	NCAA	4	5	0	5	—	—	—	—	—	—
1928–29	Dartmouth College	NCAA	17	2	0	2	—	—	—	—	—	—
1929–30	Dartmouth College	NCAA	13	4	0	4	—	—	—	—	—	—
1930–31	New Haven Eagles	Can-Am	36	3	5	8	42	—	—	—	—	—
1931–32	New York Americans	NHL	9	0	1	1	0	—	—	—	—	—
1931–32	New Haven Eagles	Can-Am	13	0	8	8	15	—	—	—	—	—
1931–32	Boston Bruins	NHL	5	0	0	0	0	—	—	—	—	—
1931–32	Boston Cubs	Can-Am	15	2	0	2	6	—	—	—	—	—
1932–33	New Haven Eagles	Can-Am	17	2	1	3	6	—	—	—	—	—
1933–34	Philadelphia Arrows	Can-Am	37	2	2	4	55	2	0	0	0	2
1934–35	Cleveland Falcons	IHL	10	0	1	1	0	2	0	0	0	2
1935–36	Boston Olympics	USAHA	—	—	—	—	—	—	—	—	—	—
Can-Am totals			118	9	16	25	124	2	0	0	0	2
NHL totals			15	0	1	1	0	—	—	—	—	—

== Head coaching record ==
Record table
Season	Team	Overall	Conference	Standing	Postseason
Dartmouth Indians (Quadrangular League) (1937–1942)
1937–38	Dartmouth	18–4–0			East Intercollegiate Champion
1938–39	Dartmouth	17–4–0			East Intercollegiate Champion
1939–40	Dartmouth	9–7–2			
1940–41	Dartmouth	7–5–2			
1941–42	Dartmouth	21–2–0			East Intercollegiate Champion
Dartmouth:		72–22–4			
Dartmouth Indians Independent (1945–1946)
1945–46	Dartmouth	6–2–0			East Intercollegiate co-Champion
Dartmouth:		6–2–0			
Dartmouth Indians (Pentagonal League) (1946–1955)
1946–47	Dartmouth	16–2–2			East Intercollegiate Champion
1947–48	Dartmouth	21–3–0			NCAA Runner-Up
1948–49	Dartmouth	17–6–0			NCAA Runner-Up
1949–50	Dartmouth	11–9–0			
1950–51	Dartmouth	9–9–1			
1951–52	Dartmouth	5–18–0			
1952–53	Dartmouth	9–14–0			
1953–54	Dartmouth	15–13–0			
1954–55	Dartmouth	10–11–0			
Dartmouth:		113–85–3			
Dartmouth Indians (Ivy League) (1955–1961)
1955–56	Dartmouth	5–18–0			
1956–57	Dartmouth	13–12–0			
1957–58	Dartmouth	13–10–1			
1958–59	Dartmouth	17–8–0			
1959–60	Dartmouth	14–5–1			
1960–61	Dartmouth	8–11–0			
Dartmouth:		70–62–2			
Dartmouth Indians (ECAC Hockey) (1961–1963)
1961–62	Dartmouth	8–12–0	8–12–0	20th	
1962–63	Dartmouth	8–12–0	8–12–0	17th	
Dartmouth:		16–24–0	16–24–0		
Dartmouth Indians (ECAC Hockey) (1964–1967)
1964–65	Dartmouth	14–9–0	8–8–0	7th	ECAC Quarterfinals
1965–66	Dartmouth	5–17–2	2–14–2	13th	
1966–67	Dartmouth	4–16–0	1–14–0	15th	
Dartmouth:		23–42–2	11–36–2		
Total:		308–239–11			
National champion Postseason invitational champion Conference regular season champion Conference regular season and conference tournament champion Division regular season champion Division regular season and conference tournament champion Conference tournament champion

Awards and achievements
Preceded by Award Created; Amo Bessone/Len Ceglarski	Spencer Penrose Award; 1950–51; 1966–67	Succeeded by Cheddy Thompson; Ned Harkness
Preceded by Ed Saugestad	Hobey Baker Legends of College Hockey Award; 2008	Succeeded by Don Roberts
