= Abner Oakes =

Canadian ice hockey player and coach (1934–2021)

Biographical details
- Born: 13 February 1934; Shawinigan Falls, Quebec, Canada
- Died: 29 May 2021 (aged 87); Hamden, Connecticut, U.S.
- Education: Dartmouth College

Playing career
- 1952–1956: Dartmouth
- Position: Forward/Defenseman

Coaching career (HC unless noted)
- 1960–1963: Dartmouth (assistant)
- 1963–1964: Dartmouth
- 1964–1967: Dartmouth (assistant)
- 1967–1970: Dartmouth

Head coaching record
- Overall: 34–55–2

Abner Oakes III (13 February 1934 - 29 May 2021) was a Canadian ice hockey player and coach who spent his entire athletic career with Dartmouth.

== Career ==
After graduating from Phillips Academy, Abner Oakes attended Dartmouth College in the autumn of 1952, playing for the ice hockey team under Eddie Jeremiah. Oakes began his career as a forward but was shifted to defence during his second season and remained there until he graduated in 1956. Afterwards Oakes signed up for active duty in the United States Navy, serving four years before becoming a naval reservist.

While in the reserves Oakes returned to Dartmouth and served as an assistant under Jeremiah at the end of Jeremiah's career. When Jeremiah stepped away from the team for the 1963-64 season, so that he could coach the 1964 men's Olympic team, Oakes served as an interim head coach and three years later became the full-time bench boss when Jeremiah retired. Oakes stayed with the Big Green until 1970 before stepping down and moving to Hamden, Connecticut. He served in the reserves until 1988, retiring as a Commander. In 2010 Oakes was inducted into the Connecticut Veterans Hall of Fame.

== Head coaching record ==
Record table
Season	Team	Overall	Conference	Standing	Postseason
Dartmouth Indians (ECAC Hockey) (1963–1964)
1963-64	Dartmouth	14-7-0	14-7-0	6th	
Dartmouth:		14-7-0	14-7-0		
Dartmouth Indians (ECAC Hockey) (1967–1970)
1967-68	Dartmouth	4-19-0	2-19-0	16th	
1968-69	Dartmouth	7-14-2	6-13-2	13th	
1969-70	Dartmouth	9-15-0	5-14-0	13th	
Dartmouth:		20-48-2	13-46-2		
Total:		34-55-2			
National champion Postseason invitational champion Conference regular season champion Conference regular season and conference tournament champion Division regular season champion Division regular season and conference tournament champion Conference tournament champion
