= Pentagonal League =

Ice hockey conference

Quadrangular League/ Pentagonal League
- Founded: 1932
- Folded: 1955
- Sports fielded: Ice hockey
- No. of teams: 4 (1932–47), 5 (1947–55)
- Region: Northeastern United States

The Pentagonal League was an ice hockey–only United States–based collegiate conference. The league was formed by Dartmouth, Harvard, Princeton and Yale as a way of determining which team, among the oldest ice hockey programs, was the best. The league is a precursor to the Ivy League.

== History ==
The four schools involved can trace the beginning of their ice hockey teams to at least 1905 with Yale's inaugural season in 1895–96 serving as the unofficial dawn of college ice hockey. All four teams were able to lay claim to a championship since their inception but no formal structure existed to dictate whether one team was superior to another. At the height of the depression, while many programs were in danger of ending, the ice hockey teams at four of the wealthiest institutions in the United States were able to stabilize their schedules by forming the Quadrangular League, an outgrowth of the previous Triangular Hockey League.

The four team league remained in place until 1943 when both Harvard and Princeton suspended their ice hockey programs due to America's participation in World War II. The league resurfaced after the war and was expanded by the addition of Army for the 1946–47 season, becoming the Pentagonal League. The Cadets left the league after two seasons and were promptly replaced by Brown. The league continued in this fashion until 1955, a year after the Ivy League was formally created.

Because the Ivy League never officially supported ice hockey as a sport, the Quadrangular and Pentagonal league are considered informal organizations and not recognized as NCAA conferences.

== Members ==
Locations of member teams

| Institution | Nickname | Location | Founded | Tenure | Fate | Current conference |
|---|---|---|---|---|---|---|
| United States Military Academy | Cadets † | West Point, New York | 1802 | 1946–1948 | Independent | Atlantic Hockey |
| Brown University | Bears | Providence, Rhode Island | 1764 | 1948–1955 | Ivy League | ECAC Hockey |
| Dartmouth College | Indians † | Hanover, New Hampshire | 1769 | 1932–1943, 1946–1955 | Ivy League | ECAC Hockey |
| Harvard University | Crimson | Boston, Massachusetts | 1636 | 1932–1943, 1946–1955 | Ivy League | ECAC Hockey |
| Princeton University | Tigers | Princeton, New Jersey | 1746 | 1932–1943, 1947–1955 | Ivy League | ECAC Hockey |
| Yale University | Bulldogs | New Haven, Connecticut | 1701 | 1932–1943, 1946–1955 | Ivy League | ECAC Hockey |

† both Army and Dartmouth have changed their athletic team names in the years since the Pentagonal League was dissolved.

== See also ==
- Intercollegiate Hockey Association
- Intercollegiate Hockey League
- Triangular Hockey League
