= George Crowe (ice hockey) =

Canadian ice hockey coach (1936–2019)

Biographical details
- Born: June 28, 1936; Rothesay, New Brunswick, Canada
- Died: January 6, 2019 (aged 82); Florida, U.S.

Coaching career (HC unless noted)
- 1960–1964: Albany Academy for Boys
- 1964–1969: Oswego State
- 1969–1975: Phillips Exeter Academy
- 1975–1984: Dartmouth
- 1986-1998: Dartmouth (women's)

Head coaching record
- Overall: 340-259-32 (.564)

Accomplishments and honors

Championships
- 1979-80 ECAC Ivy Division; 1990-91 Ivy League; 1992-93 Ivy League; 1994-95 Ivy League; 1997-98 Ivy League

Awards
- 2001 Wearer of the Green; 2001 Shaeffer Penn Award; 2004 Joe Burke Award

George Crowe (June 28, 1936 – January 6, 2019) was a Canadian ice hockey coach who spent nearly 40 years in the college and high school ranks. For 21 years, Crowe coached both the men's and women's programs at Dartmouth.

== Career ==
George Crowe began his coaching career at the Albany Academy for Boys before moving into the college level to take over for the newly minted club team at Oswego State in 1964. The Great Lakers became a Division III in 1966, and while they had success early on, Crowe left the program after only three more years. He returned to coach high school hockey, this time at Phillips Exeter Academy. Six years on Crowe accepted a second coaching gig in the NCAA, this time with Dartmouth.

When Crowe arrived in Hanover, the Big Green hadn't made a tournament appearance in 26 years and had 15 losing seasons in that span. Crowe's arrival brought about immediate dividends when Dartmouth won 11 more games than the previous season and, after two middling years, the Big Green posted back-to-back 19-win seasons, making the tournament in both 1979 and 1980 (The team's last appearance as of 2016). Unfortunately, Dartmouth began losing soon thereafter once more ending up with sub-.500 records in each of the next four seasons, bottoming out with a 3-23 mark in 1983–84 (a team-worst record to that point). After the season, Crowe resigned to spend more time with his Elite Sports Camps.

After going through 3 separate head coaches over the previous three seasons, the women's team at Dartmouth was looking for yet another bench boss and turned to Crowe to stabilize the program. The choice was soon proven to be a correct one as Crowe led the Big Green to winning seasons in each of the twelve years with the women's team. In that time, Dartmouth won four Ivy League titles and became a perennial power. Crowe retired from coaching for good following the 1997–98 season, turning the team over to Judy Oberting

He died on January 6, 2019, at the age of 82.

== Head coaching record ==
Record table
Season	Team	Overall	Conference	Standing	Postseason
Oswego State Great Lakers (ECAC 2) (1966–1969)
1966-67	Oswego State	15-4-1	2-1-1		
1967-68	Oswego State	10-10-1	4-3-1		
1968-69	Oswego State	10-11-0	6-6-0		
Oswego State:		35-25-2	12-10-2		
Dartmouth Big Green (ECAC Hockey) (1975–1984)
1975-76	Dartmouth	16-11-0	14-10-0	6th	ECAC Quarterfinals
1976-77	Dartmouth	12-12-2	11-12-1	10th	
1977-78	Dartmouth	11-15-0	9-14-0	t-11th	
1978-79	Dartmouth	19-9-2	14-7-1	4th	NCAA Consolation Game (Win)
1979-80	Dartmouth	19-11-1	15-6-1	3rd	NCAA Consolation Game (Win)
1980-81	Dartmouth	10-16-0	8-14-0	15th	
1981-82	Dartmouth	10-15-1	6-14-1	15th	
1982-83	Dartmouth	9-15-2	6-14-1	14th	
1983-84	Dartmouth	3-23-0	3-18-0	16th	
Dartmouth:		109-127-8	86-109-5		
Dartmouth Big Green (Women) (Ivy League) (1986–1998)
1986-87	Dartmouth	11-10-0			
1987-88	Dartmouth	15-8-3			
1988-89	Dartmouth	17-9-2			
1989-90	Dartmouth	11-9-3			
1990-91	Dartmouth	19-7-0			
1991-92	Dartmouth	18-8-0			
1992-93	Dartmouth	19-7-1			
1993-94	Dartmouth	14-10-2			
1994-95	Dartmouth	16-8-4			
1995-96	Dartmouth	20-9-3			
1996-97	Dartmouth	16-13-1			
1997-98	Dartmouth	20-9-3			
Dartmouth:		196-107-22			
Total:		340-259-32			
National champion Postseason invitational champion Conference regular season champion Conference regular season and conference tournament champion Division regular season champion Division regular season and conference tournament champion Conference tournament champion
