= Dartmouth Big Green men's ice hockey statistical leaders =

The Dartmouth Big Green men's ice hockey statistical leaders are individual statistical leaders of the Dartmouth Big Green men's ice hockey program in various categories, including goals, assists, points, and saves. Within those areas, the lists identify single-game, single-season, and career leaders. The Big Green represent Dartmouth College in the NCAA's ECAC Hockey.

Dartmouth began competing in intercollegiate ice hockey in 1905. These lists are updated through the end of the 2021–22 season.

== Goals ==
Career
Rk	Player	Goals	Seasons
1	William Riley	118	1942–43 1946–47 1947–48 1948–49
2	Richard Rondeau	103	1941–42 1942–43 1943–44
3	Ross Brownridge	70	1976–77 1977–78 1978–79 1979–80
4	Joseph Riley	67	1946–47 1947–48 1948–49
5	David Leighton	66	1960–61 1961–62 1962–63
	Paul Guibord	66	1933–34 1934–35 1935–36
7	Robert Moore	65	1958–59 1959–60 1960–61
8	William Harrison	64	1941–42 1942–43 1943–44
9	Lee Stempniak	63	2001–02 2002–03 2003–04 2004–05
10	John Titus	61	1951–52 1952–53 1953–54

Season
Rk	Player	Goals	Season
1	Joseph Riley	45	1947–48
	Richard Rondeau	45	1941–42
3	William Harrison	38	1941–42
4	David Leighton	37	1961–62
	John Titus	37	1953–54
	William Riley	37	1948–49
7	Arnold Oss, Jr.	36	1949–50
8	Daniel McCarthy	32	1953–54
9	Richard Rondeau	31	1943–44
10	Ross Brownridge	30	1979–80
	William Riley	30	1947–48

Single Game
Rk	Player	Goals	Season	Opponent
1	Richard Rondeau	12	1943–44	Middlebury
2	Bruce Cunliffe	8	1943–44	Middlebury
3	Richard Rondeau	7	1943–44	Williams
	Jim Malone	7	1946–47	Harvard
5	Clarence Wanamaker	6	1914–15	Columbia
	William Harrison	6	1941–42	Army
	Joseph Riley	6	1948–49	Princeton
	Bob Moore	6	1960–61	Brown
9	Dave Leighton	5	1961–62	Northeastern
	Dave Leighton	5	1961–62	New Hampshire
	William Harrison	5	1941–42	Clarkson
	Henry Stucklen	5	1908–09	Springfield
	Robert Hall	5	1923–24	Springfield
	Francis Sheehy	5	1923–24	Massachusetts
	Doug Everett	5	1925–26	Princeton
	Myles Lane	5	1927–28	M.I.T.
	Paul Guibord	5	1935–36	M.I.T.
	Dan Sullivan	5	1939–40	Harvard
	Richard Rondeau	5	1942–43	Boston College
	William Riley	5	1942–43	Northeastern
	Bruce Mather	5	1943–44	Army
	Ralph Warburton	5	1944–45	Cornell
	William Riley	5	1948–49	Princeton
	Arnold Oss, Jr.	5	1949–50	Harvard
	Arnold Oss, Jr.	5	1949–50	Princeton
	Bruce Cullen	5	1982–83	Union

== Assists ==
Career
Rk	Player	Assists	Seasons
1	William Riley	110	1942–43 1946–47 1947–48 1948–49
2	Ross Brownridge	96	1976–77 1977–78 1978–79 1979–80
3	Lee Stempniak	88	2001–02 2002–03 2003–04 2004–05
4	Clifford Harrison	84	1947–48 1948–49 1949–50 1950–51
5	John Donnelly	83	1979–80 1980–81 1981–82 1982–83
6	Dennis Murphy	80	1976–77 1977–78 1978–79 1979–80
	Mike Ouellette	80	2002–03 2003–04 2004–05 2005–06
8	Doug Jones	78	2008–09 2009–10 2010–11 2011–12
9	Michael Turner	76	1969–70 1970–71 1971–72
10	Tom Fleming	73	1973–74 1974–75 1975–76
	Richard Rondeau	73	1941–42 1942–43 1943–44

Season
Rk	Player	Assists	Season
1	William Riley	41	1948–49
2	Clifford Harrison	36	1948–49
	William Harrison	36	1942–43
4	Tom Fleming	34	1975–76
	William Riley	34	1942–43
6	Joseph Riley	32	1948–49
7	Richard Rondeau	31	1941–42
	Albert Foster	31	1938–39
9	Bruce Mather	30	1946–47
10	Lee Stempniak	29	2004–05

Single Game
Rk	Player	Assists	Season	Opponent
1	Richard Rondeau	11	1943–44	Middlebury
2	Jack Riley	6	1941–42	Clarkson
	Richard Rondeau	6	1942–43	Northeastern
	William Harrison	6	1942–43	Northeastern
	Bruce Cunliffe	6	1943–44	Middlebury
	Bruce Mather	6	1943–44	Middlebury
	Clifford Harrison	6	1948–49	Army
	Dan Goggin	6	1956–57	Yale
	Jake Haertl	6	1959–60	Cornell
10	Bruce Mather	5	1943–44	Williams
	Dan Sullivan	5	1939–40	Colgate
	William Harrison	5	1941–42	Clarkson
	Richard Rondeau	5	1941–42	Princeton
	William Riley	5	1942–43	Boston College
	William Harrison	5	1942–43	Northeastern
	Bruce Mather	5	1945–46	Boston College
	Bruce Mather	5	1946–47	Harvard
	William Riley	5	1948–49	Princeton
	Daniel McCarthy	5	1953–54	Northeastern
	John Titus	5	1953–54	Providence
	Doug Hayes	5	1964–65	New Hampshire
	Bill Berry	5	1971–72	Northeastern
	Ross Brownridge	5	1978–79	Colgate
	Lee Stempniak	5	2002–03	UMass-Lowell

== Points ==
Career
Rk	Player	Points	Seasons
1	William Riley	228	1942–43 1946–47 1947–48 1948–49
2	Richard Rondeau	176	1941–42 1942–43 1943–44
3	Ross Brownridge	166	1976–77 1977–78 1978–79 1979–80
4	Lee Stempniak	151	2001–02 2002–03 2003–04 2004–05
5	Clifford Harrison	138	1947–48 1948–49 1949–50 1950–51
	Mike Ouellette	138	2002–03 2003–04 2004–05 2005–06
7	Dennis Murphy	136	1976–77 1977–78 1978–79 1979–80
8	Tom Fleming	133	1973–74 1974–75 1975–76
	Michael Turner	133	1969–70 1970–71 1971–72
10	William Harrison	128	1941–42 1942–43 1943–44

Season
Rk	Player	Points	Season
1	William Riley	78	1948–49
2	Joseph Riley	77	1948–49
3	Richard Rondeau	76	1941–42
4	William Harrison	74	1941–42
5	John Titus	61	1953–54
6	William Riley	60	1942–43
7	Ross Brownridge	59	1979–80
8	Daniel McCarthy	58	1953–54
9	Bruce Mather	56	1946–47
10	Arnold Oss, Jr.	55	1949–50

Single Game
Rk	Player	Points	Season	Opponent
1	Richard Rondeau	23	1943–44	Middlebury
2	Bruce Cunliffe	14	1943–44	Middlebury
3	William Harrison	10	1941–42	Clarkson
	Richard Rondeau	10	1942–43	Northeastern
	Bruce Mather	10	1943–44	Middlebury
	Joseph Riley	10	1948–49	Princeton
7	Jack Riley	9	1941–42	Clarkson
	William Riley	9	1942–43	Boston College
	Jim Malone	9	1946–47	Harvard
	Richard Rondeau	9	1942–43	Boston College

== Saves ==
Career
Rk	Player	Saves	Seasons
1	Nick Boucher	2,803	1999–00 2000–01 2001–02 2002–03
2	Mike Devine	2,469	2004–05 2005–06 2006–07 2007–08
3	Steve Laurin	2,197	1986–87 1987–88 1988–89 1989–90
4	Bob Gaudet	2,129	1977–78 1978–79 1979–80 1980–81
5	Charles Grant	2,093	2012–13 2013–14 2014–15 2015–16
6	Jody O'Neill	1,912	2008–09 2009–10 2010–11 2011–12
7	Peter Proulx	1,882	1970–71 1971–72 1972–73
8	Adrian Clark	1,871	2016–17 2017–18 2018–19 2019–20
9	Mike Bracco	1,838	1990–91 1991–92 1992–93 1993–94
10	Jeff Sollows	1,812	1974–75 1975–76 1976–77

Season
Rk	Player	Saves	Season
1	Nick Boucher	867	2000–01

Single Game
Rk	Player	Saves	Season	Opponent
1	Nick Boucher	66	2002–03	Colgate
2	Warren Cook	63	1966–67	New Hampshire
3	Dirk Frankenburg	62	1956–57	Clarkson
	Chuck Walker	62	1973–74	Boston University
5	Jim Cruickshank	59	1966–67	Boston University
6	Steve Laurin	58	1987–88	Rensselaer
7	Dirk Frankenburg	56	1958–59	Minnesota
	Tim Osby	56	1986–87	St. Lawrence
9	Mike Devine	54	2007–08	New Hampshire
10	Jay Samek	53	1984–85	Princeton
	Jody O'Neill	53	2008–09	Yale
