= List of Olympic men's ice hockey players for the United States =

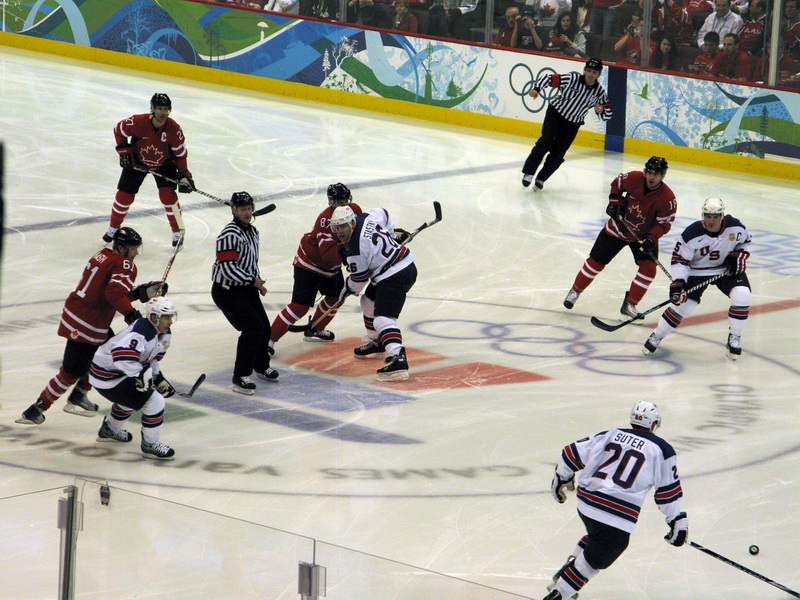
The American team (in white) against the Canadian team (in red) at the 2010 Winter Olympics.

Men's ice hockey tournaments have been staged at the Olympic Games since 1920. The men's tournament was introduced at the 1920 Summer Olympics, and permanently added to the Winter Olympic Games in 1924. The United States has participated in 22 of 23 tournaments, sending 43 goaltenders and 282 skaters.

For the first two tournaments, the United States sent club amateur teams with additional players from other squads. After sitting out the 1928 tournament, they returned in 1932 with a team made up almost entirely of players attending college in the US. The early American teams were successful, winning three silver medals and a bronze in the first five tournaments. In 1948, controversy struck when the US sent two teams to the Olympics. Two competing bodies, the American Hockey Association and the Amateur Athletic Union, each claimed that their team had the right to represent the United States. As a compromise, the AHA team was permitted to compete, but they would be prohibited from qualifying for a medal.

In 1960, an unheralded American squad defeated the Canadian and Soviet squads on American soil en route to their first Olympic gold medal. The next several years were not as successful, and the Americans fell in the rankings; when the United States won silver in 1972, it did so from the B Pool, becoming the first B Pool squad to medal in an Olympic tournament. In 1980, Herb Brooks, the last man cut from the team that won gold in 1960, was named coach, and selected a team of college hockey players. The Americans shocked the world by first upsetting the heavily favored Soviet team 4–3, and then they defeated Finland for the gold medal. The "Miracle on Ice", as the game against the Soviets came to be known, was later named as the greatest moment in international hockey history by the IIHF, and the story was later turned into two motion pictures, Miracle on Ice and Miracle.

The Olympic Games were originally intended for amateur athletes, so the players of the National Hockey League (NHL) and other professional leagues were not allowed to compete. The countries that benefited most were the Soviet Bloc countries of Eastern Europe, where top athletes were state-sponsored while retaining their status as amateurs. In 1986, the International Olympic Committee (IOC) voted to allow all athletes to compete in Olympic Games, starting in 1988. The NHL decided not to allow all players to participate in 1988, 1992 or 1994, because doing so would force the league to halt play during the Olympics. An agreement was reached in 1995 that allowed NHL players to compete in the Olympics, starting with the 1998 Games in Nagano, Japan. Since that time, the Americans have won two silver medals, losing both times to Canada in the gold medal game in North America (2002 in Salt Lake City and 2010 in Vancouver). National teams are co-ordinated by USA Hockey and players are chosen by the team's management staff.

The United States has won two gold medals, eight silver medals and one bronze medal in men's ice hockey; the Americans have won more silver medals than any other nation. Four players have been inducted into the Hockey Hall of Fame, seven into the IIHF Hall of Fame and sixty-two individuals into the United States Hockey Hall of Fame. In addition, two teams have been inducted into the US Hockey Hall of Fame and the United States Olympic Hall of Fame: the gold medal-winning 1960 and 1980 teams. Two players—Chris Chelios and Keith Tkachuk—have played on four teams. According to the IOC database, 176 men have won medals; ten players—Bill Cleary, Chris Drury, Herbert Drury, John Garrison, John Mayasich, Dick Meredith, Weldon Olson, Brian Rafalski, Richard Rodenheiser, and Frank Synott—have won two medals. Keith Tkachuk holds the record for most games played, having dressed for 23 games in 1992, 1998, 2002, and 2006. Herbert Drury leads American Olympians in goals, having scored 33 goals in 1920 and 1924 (before assists were counted); Bruce Cunliffe scored 23 points (17 goals and 6 assists) in 1948, and Bill Christian recorded 12 assists in 1960 and 1964.

== Key ==
General terms
| Term | Definition |
|---|---|
| GP | Games played |
| HHOF | Hockey Hall of Fame |
| IIHFHOF | International Ice Hockey Federation Hall of Fame |
| USHHOF | United States Hockey Hall of Fame |
| USOHOF | United States Olympic Hall of Fame |
| Olympics | Number of Olympic Games tournaments |
| Ref(s) | Reference(s) |

Goaltender statistical abbreviations
| Abbreviation | Definition |
|---|---|
| W | Wins |
| L | Losses |
| T | Ties |
| Min | Minutes played |
| SO | Shutouts |
| GA | Goals against |
| GAA | Goals against average |

Skater statistical abbreviations
| Abbreviation | Definition |
|---|---|
| G | Goals |
| A | Assists |
| P | Points |
| PIM | Penalty minutes |
| — | Not applicable |

== Goaltenders ==
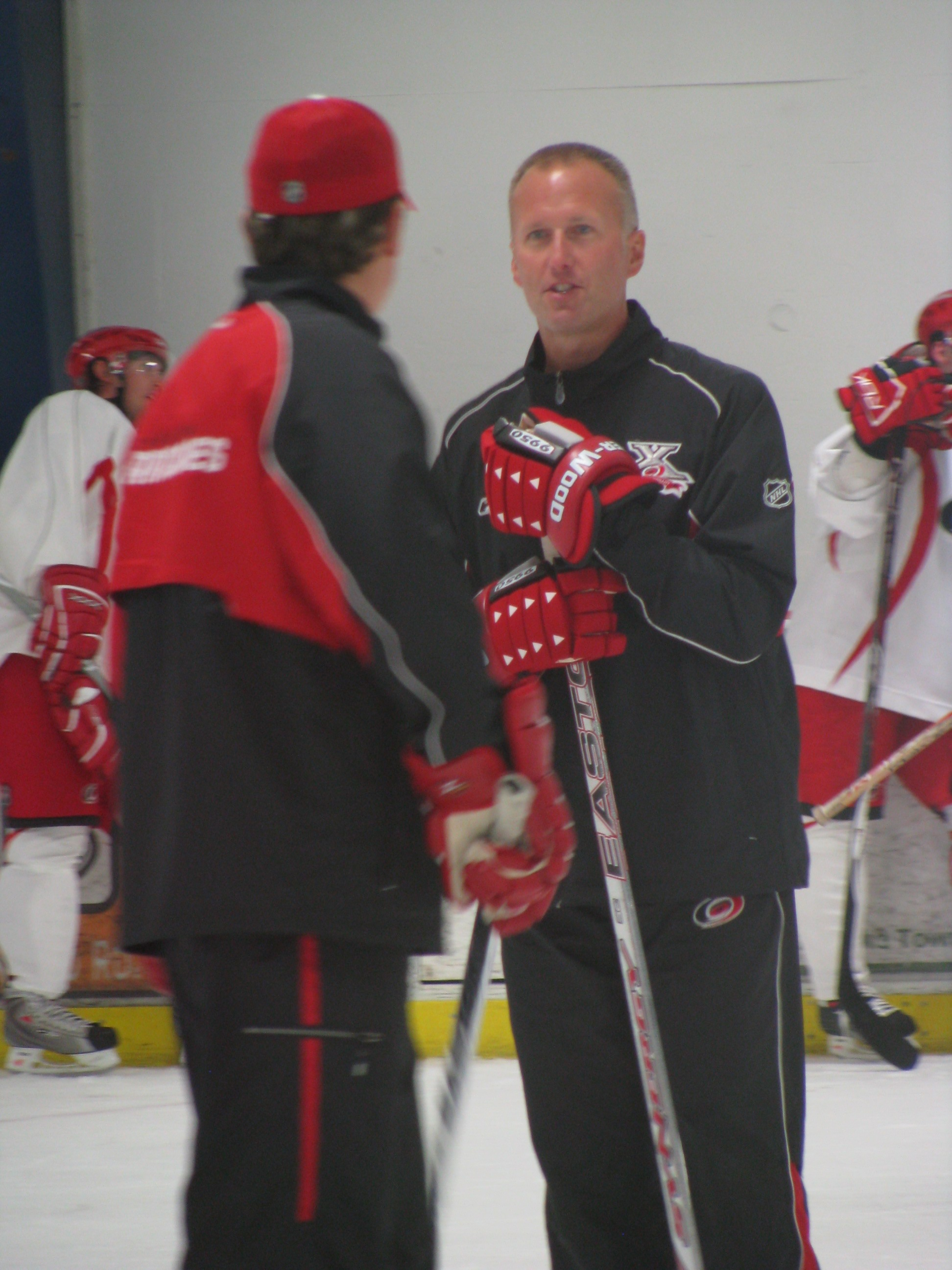
Tom Barrasso, shown here as a coach with the Carolina Hurricanes, won the only game of his Olympic career in 2002.

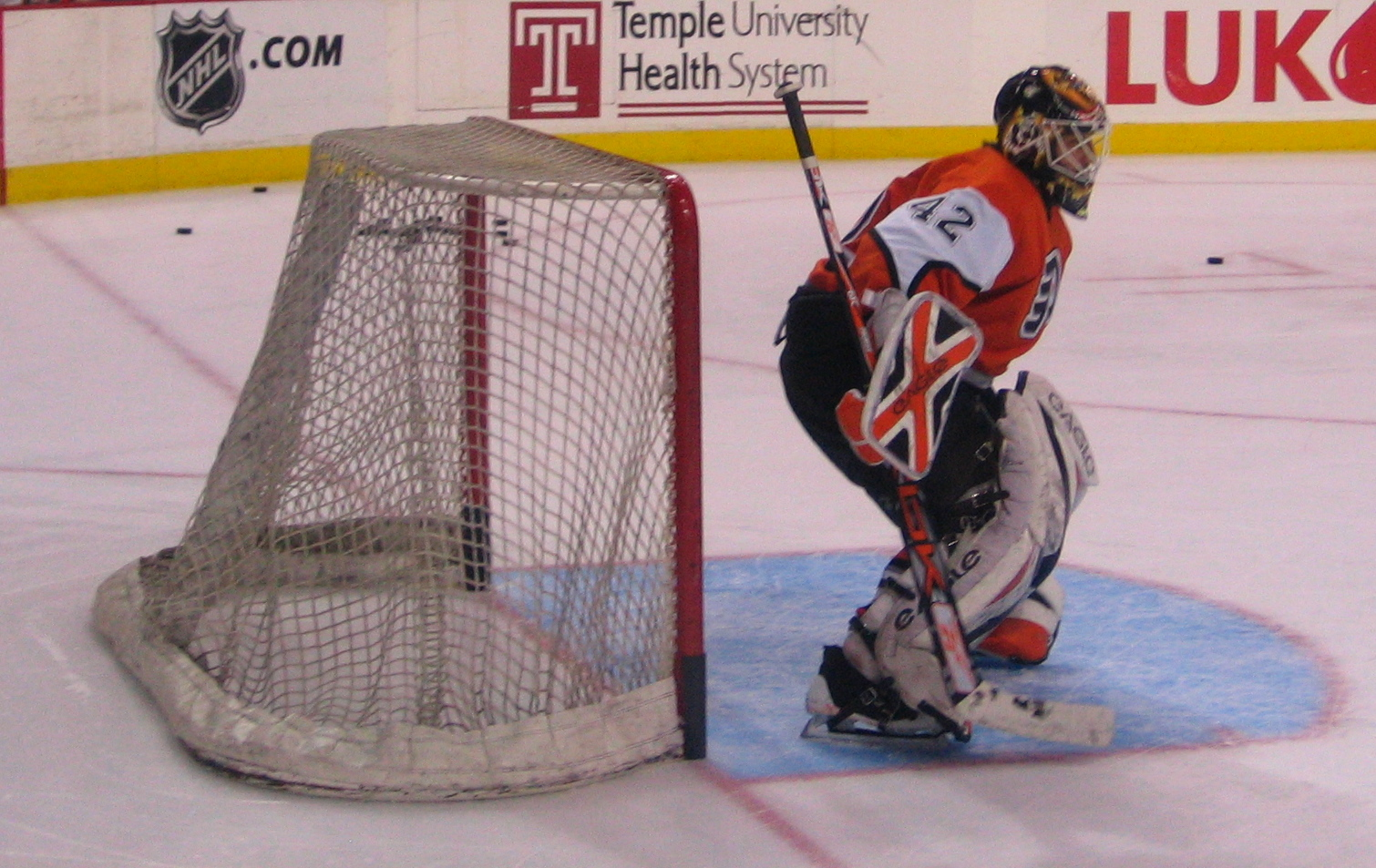
Robert Esche played one game for Team USA in 2006.

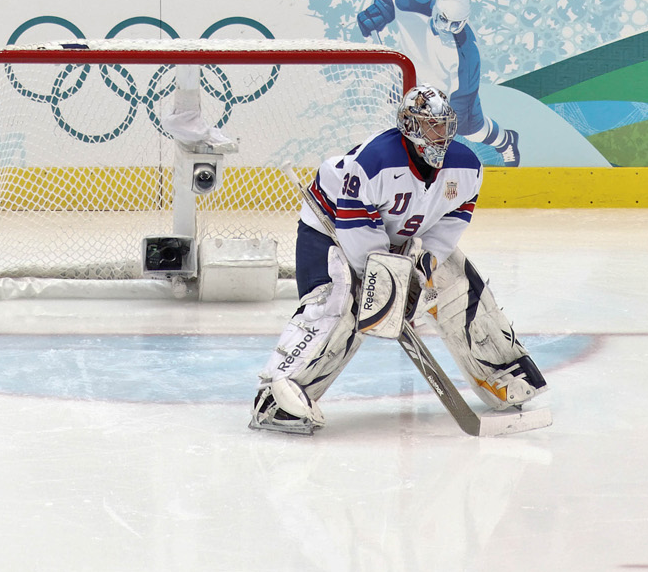
Ryan Miller led the US to a silver medal in 2010, and was named MVP of the Olympic tournament.

Goaltenders
| Player | Olympics | Tournaments | GP | W | L | T | Min | SO | GA | GAA | Medals | Notes | Ref(s) |
|---|---|---|---|---|---|---|---|---|---|---|---|---|---|
| Tom Barrasso | 1 | 2002 | 1 | 1 | 0 | 0 | 60 | 0 | 1 | 1.00 | Silver (2002) | USHHOF (2009) | |
| Marc Behrend | 1 | 1984 | 4 | 0 | 1 | 2 | 200 | 0 | 11 | 3.30 | | | |
| Raymond Bonney | 1 | 1920 | 2 | 1 | 1 | 0 | 80 | 1 | 2 | 1.50 | Silver (1920) | | |
| Drew Commesso | 1 | 2022 | 2 | 2 | 0 | 0 | 120 | 1 | 2 | 1.00 | | | |
| Jim Craig | 1 | 1980 | 7 | 6 | 0 | 1 | 420 | 0 | 15 | 2.14 | Gold (1980) | IIHFHOF (1999); USHHOF (2003); USOHOF (1983) | |
| Mike Curran | 1 | 1972 | 5 | 3 | 2 | 0 | 300 | 0 | 15 | 3.00 | Silver (1972) | IIHFHOF (1999); USHHOF (1998) | |
| Dick Desmond | 1 | 1952 | 4 | 3 | 0 | 1 | 240 | 0 | 10 | 2.50 | Silver (1952) | USHHOF (1988) | |
| Rick DiPietro | 1 | 2006 | 4 | 1 | 3 | 0 | 237 | 0 | 9 | 2.28 | | | |
| Mike Dunham | 2 | 1994, 2002 | 4 | 1 | 2 | 1 | 240 | 1 | 15 | 3.75 | Silver (2002) | | |
| Robert Esche | 1 | 2006 | 1 | 0 | 1 | 0 | 59 | 0 | 5 | 5.10 | | | |
| Frank Farrell | 1 | 1932 | 6 | 4 | 1 | 1 | 310 | 3 | 5 | 0.97 | Silver (1932) | | |
| Scott Gordon | 1 | 1992 | 1 | 0 | 0 | 0 | 17 | 0 | 2 | 6.97 | | | |
| John Grahame | 1 | 2006 | 1 | 0 | 1 | 0 | 60 | 0 | 3 | 3.00 | | | |
| Goodwin Harding | 1 | 1948 | 8 | 5 | 3 | 0 | 480 | 0 | 33 | 4.13 | | Team Captain (1948) | |
| Willard Ikola | 1 | 1956 | 3 | 1 | 2 | 0 | 180 | 0 | 9 | 3.00 | Silver (1956) | USHHOF (1990) | |
| Alphonse Lacroix | 1 | 1924 | 5 | 4 | 1 | 0 | 260 | 3 | 6 | 1.38 | Silver (1924) | | |
| Art Langley | 1 | 1924 | 1 | 0 | 0 | 0 | 40 | 0 | 0 | 0.00 | Silver (1924) | | |
| Ray LeBlanc | 1 | 1992 | 8 | 5 | 2 | 1 | 463 | 2 | 17 | 2.20 | | | |
| James Logue | 1 | 1968 | 1 | 0 | 1 | 0 | 40 | 0 | 10 | 15.00 | | | |
| Strauss Mann | 1 | 2022 | 2 | 1 | 1 | 0 | 130 | 0 | 4 | 1.85 | | | |
| Bob Mason | 1 | 1984 | 3 | 2 | 1 | 0 | 160 | 0 | 10 | 3.76 | | | |
| Jack McCartan | 1 | 1960 | 7 | 7 | 0 | 0 | 413 | 0 | 17 | 2.47 | Gold (1960) | USHHOF (1983); USHHOF (2000) (Note: McCartan was inducted individually in 1983, before being inducted as a member of the 1960 team in 2000.); USOHOF (1989) | |
| Ryan Miller | 2 | 2010, 2014 | 7 | 6 | 1 | 0 | 415 | 1 | 9 | 1.30 | Silver (2010) | Tournament MVP (2010); Tournament best goaltender (2010) | |
| Thomas Moone | 1 | 1936 | 8 | 5 | 2 | 1 | 410 | 5 | 4 | 0.59 | Bronze (1936) | | |
| Lawrence Palmer | 1 | 1960 | 1 | 0 | 0 | 0 | 7 | 0 | 0 | 0.00 | Gold (1960) | USHHOF (2000); USOHOF (1989) | |
| Jonathan Quick | 2 | 2010, 2014 | 5 | 3 | 2 | 0 | 304 | 0 | 11 | 2.17 | Silver (2010) | | |
| Mike Richter | 3 | 1988, 1998, 2002 | 12 | 4 | 7 | 1 | 707 | 1 | 38 | 3.22 | Silver (2002) | USHHOF (2008) | |
| Don Rigazio | 1 | 1956 | 4 | 4 | 0 | 0 | 240 | 1 | 7 | 1.75 | Silver (1956) | | |
| Pat Rupp | 2 | 1964, 1968 | 13 | 4 | 6 | 1 | 709 | 0 | 40 | 3.39 | | | |
| Garth Snow | 1 | 1994 | 5 | 1 | 2 | 2 | 299 | 0 | 17 | 3.41 | | | |
| Chris Terreri | 1 | 1988 | 3 | 1 | 1 | 0 | 128 | 0 | 14 | 6.58 | | | |
| Tim Thomas | 1 | 2010 | 1 | 0 | 0 | 0 | 12 | 0 | 1 | 5.21 | Silver (2010) | | |
| John Vanbiesbrouck | 1 | 1998 | 1 | 0 | 0 | 0 | 1 | 0 | 0 | 0.00 | | USHHOF (2007) | |
| Jim Warden | 1 | 1976 | 5 | 2 | 3 | 0 | 300 | 0 | 21 | 4.20 | | | |
| Cyril Weidenborner | 1 | 1920 | 2 | 2 | 0 | 0 | 80 | 2 | 0 | 0.00 | Silver (1920) | | |
| Donald Whiston | 1 | 1952 | 4 | 3 | 1 | 0 | 240 | 0 | 11 | 2.75 | Silver (1952) | | |
| Tom Yurkovich | 1 | 1964 | 2 | 0 | 2 | 0 | 91 | 0 | 11 | 7.22 | | | |
| Ryan Zapolski | 1 | 2018 | 5 | 2 | 3 | 0 | 310 | 0 | 12 | 2.32 | | | |

=== Reserve goaltenders ===
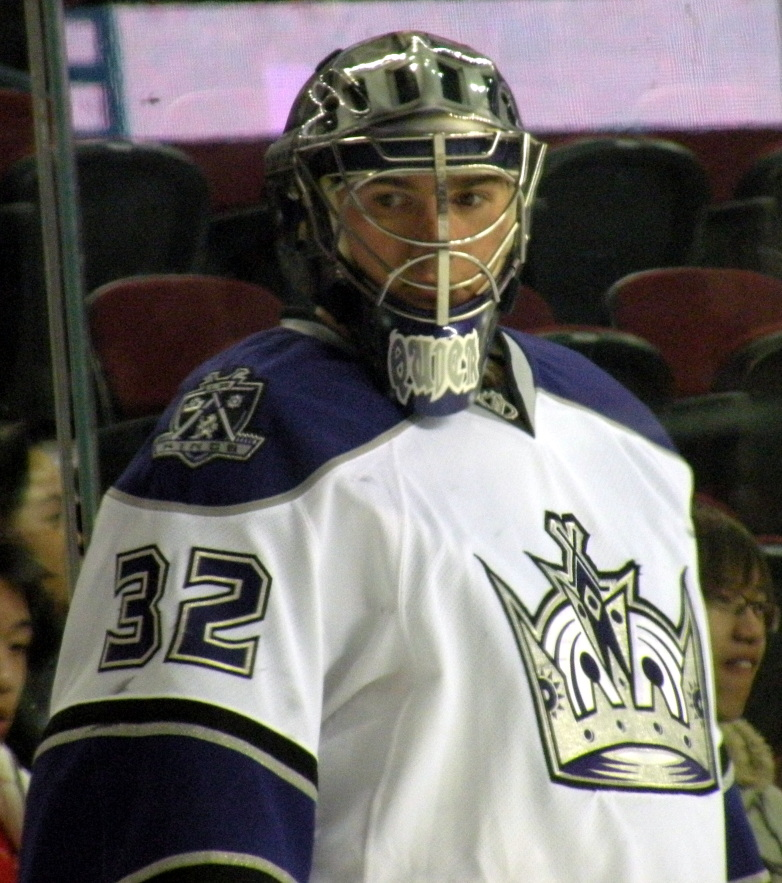
Jonathan Quick was a member of the 2010 team, but was the third-string goaltender and did not see any playing time.

These goaltenders were named to the Olympic roster, but did not receive any ice time during games.

Reserve goaltenders
| Player | Tournaments | Medals | Notes | Ref(s) |
|---|---|---|---|---|
| John Blue | 1988 | | | |
| Blane Comstock | 1976 | | | |
| Edwin Frazier | 1932 | Silver (1932) | | |
| Guy Hebert | 1998 | | | |
| Jon Hillebrandt | 1994 | | | |
| Jimmy Howard | 2014 | | | |
| Steve Janaszak | 1980 | Gold (1980) | USHHOF (2003); USOHOF (1983) | |
| David Leggio | 2018 | | | |
| Brandon Maxwell | 2018 | | | |
| Pat Nagle | 2022 | | | |
| Peter Sears | 1972 | Silver (1972) | | |

== Skaters ==
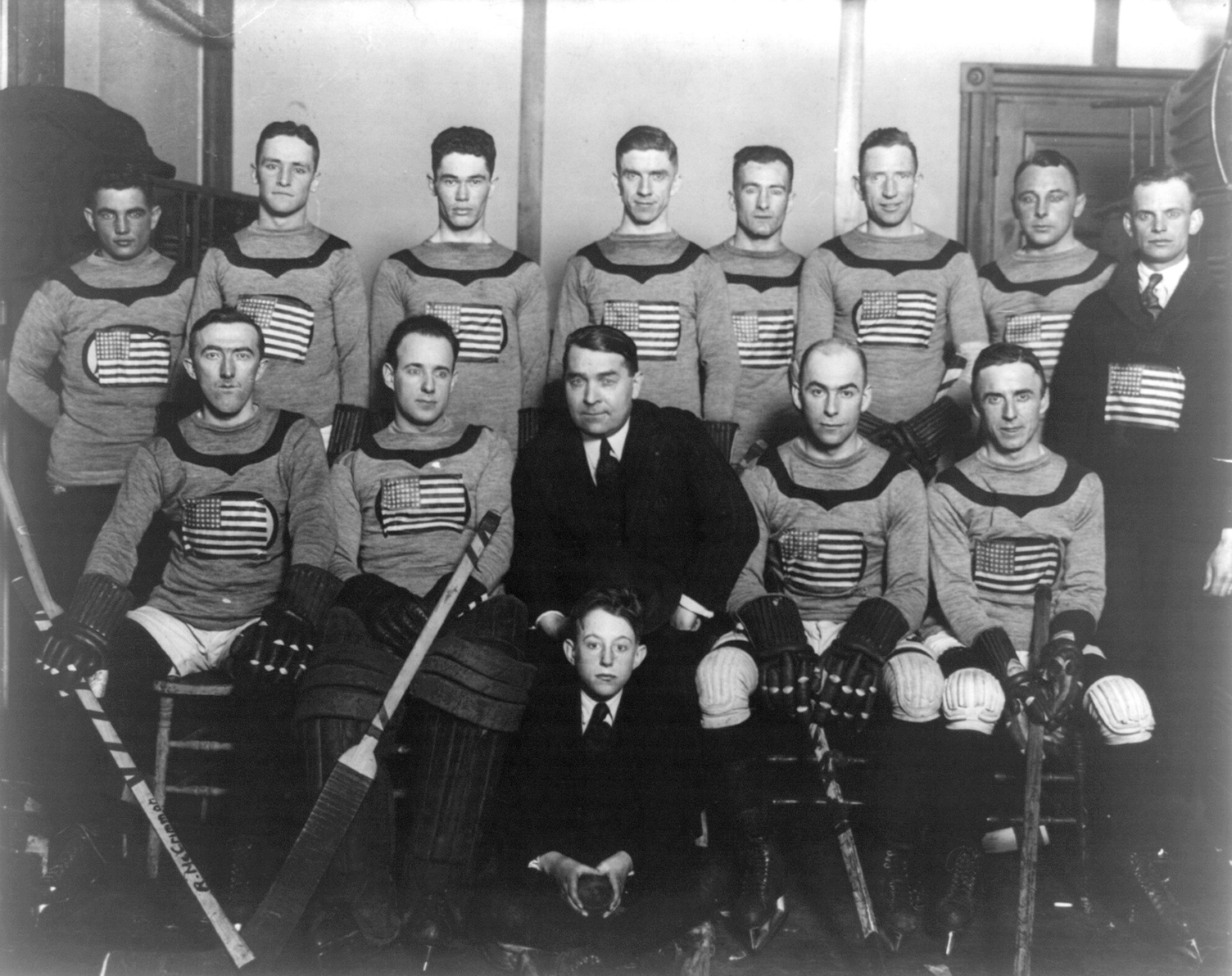
The American team won a silver medal at the first ever hockey tournament played at the 1920 Summer Olympics.

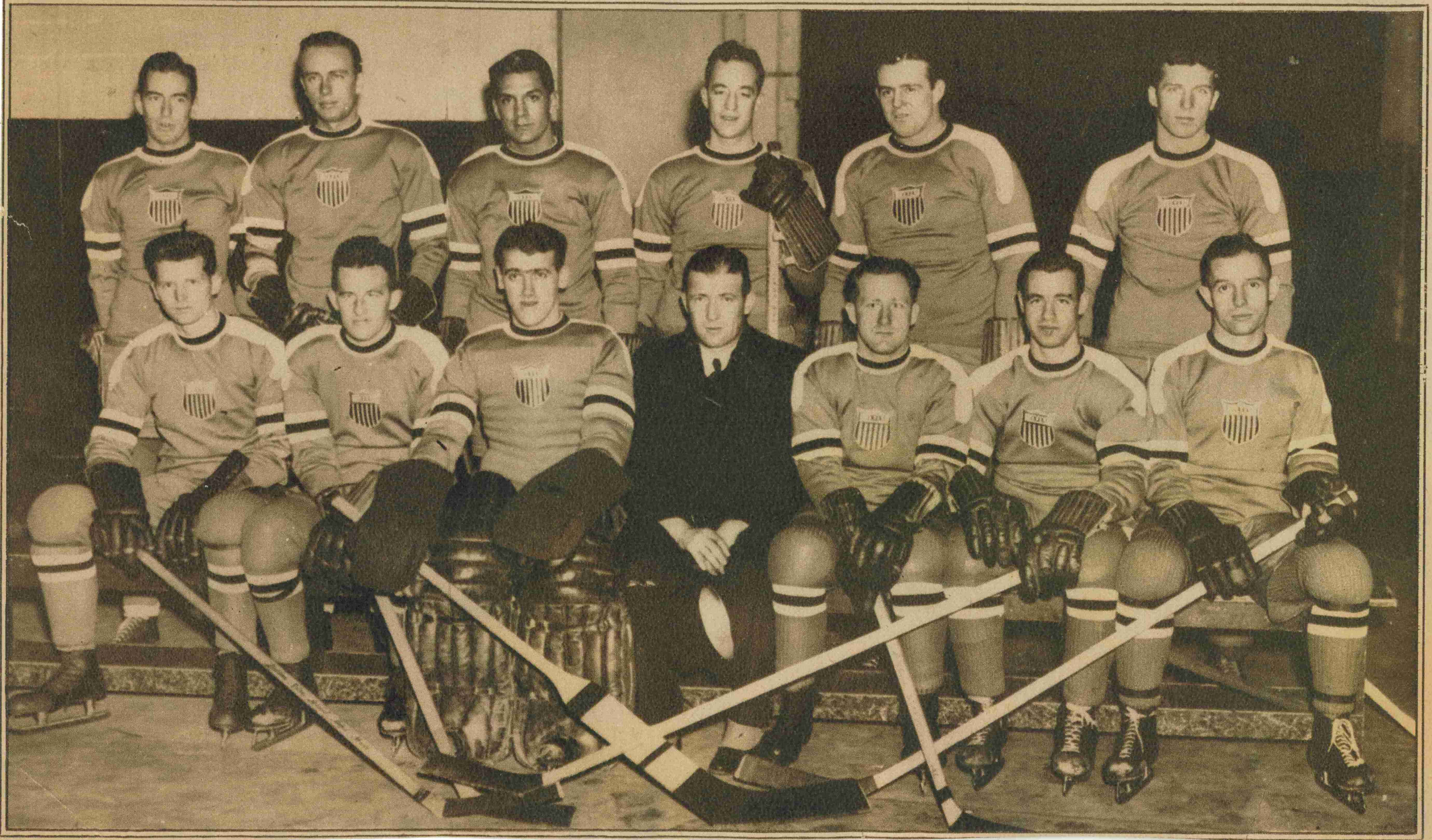
The Americans won a bronze medal at the 1936 Winter Olympics.

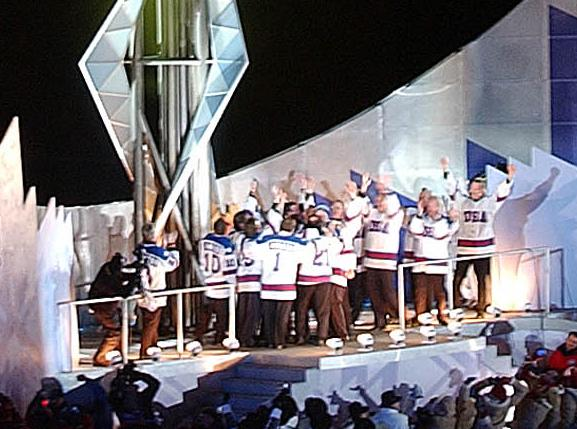
The gold medal-winning 1980 team lit the Olympic flame at the 2002 Olympics in Salt Lake City.

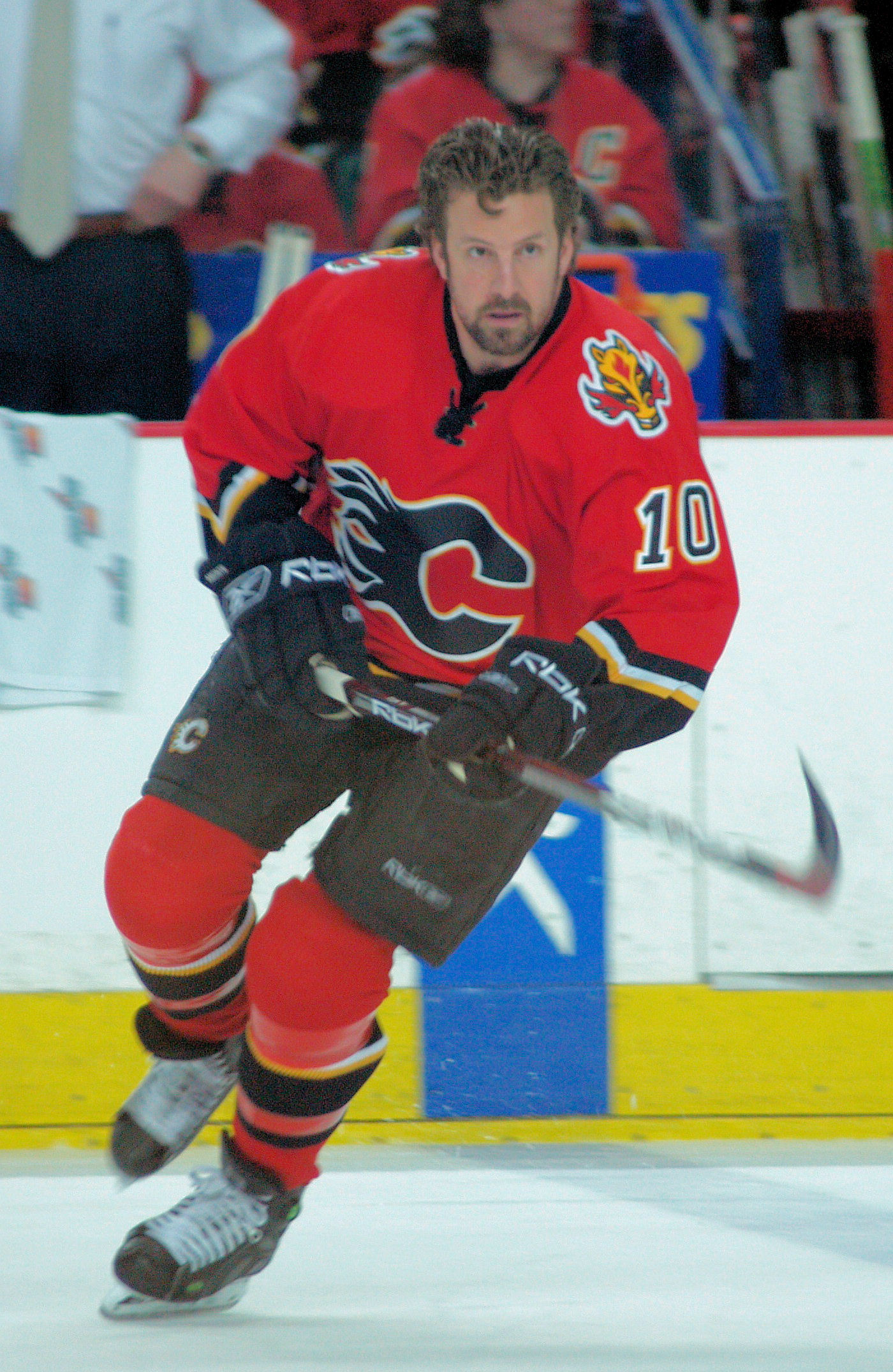
Tony Amonte played in two Olympics for the United States, winning a silver medal in 2002.

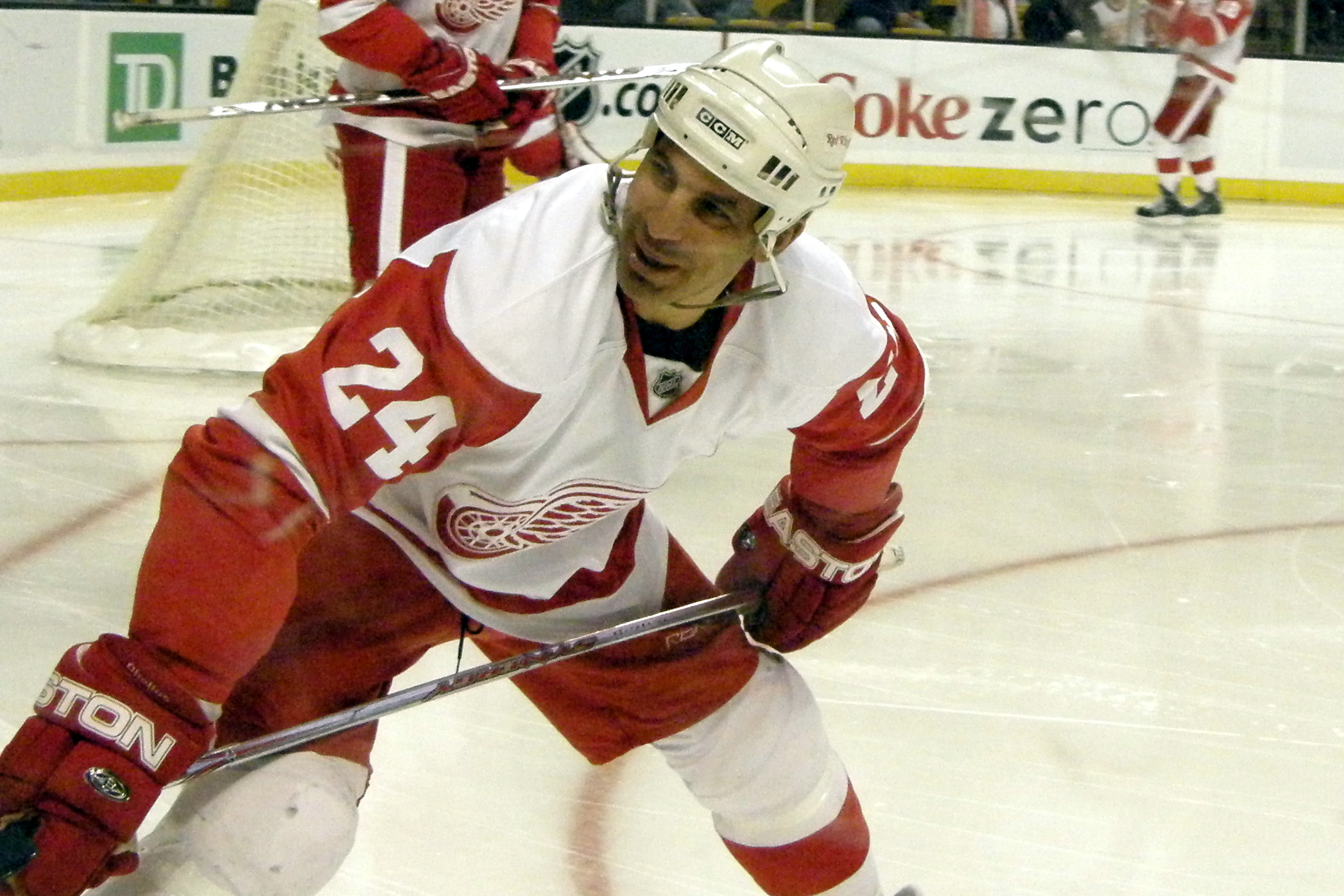
Chris Chelios is the only three-time captain in US Olympic history.

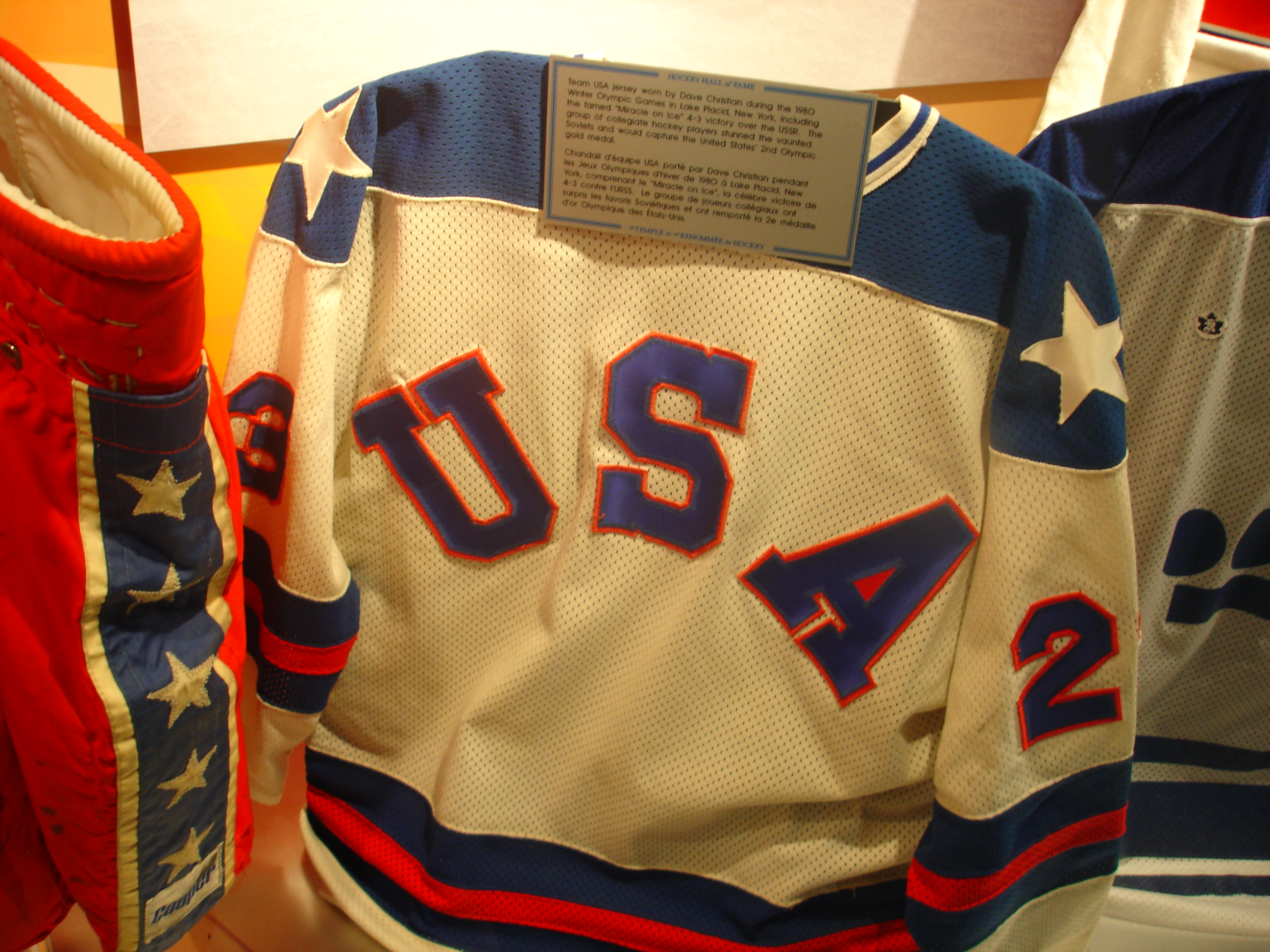
Dave Christian's jersey that he wore during the Miracle on Ice victory over the Soviet Union in 1980 is on display at the Hockey Hall of Fame.

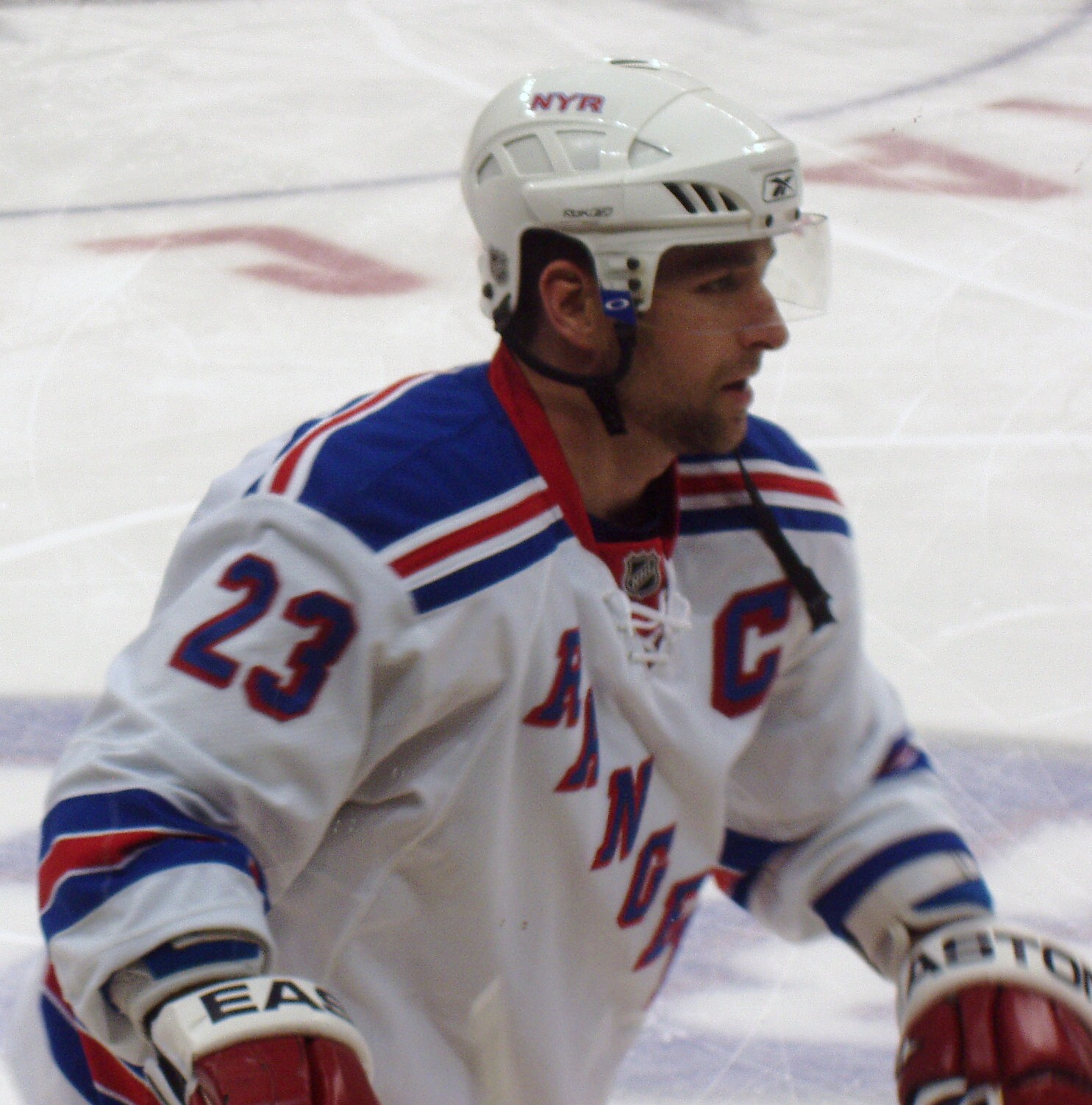
Chris Drury has played in three consecutive Olympic games for the United States, winning two silver medals.

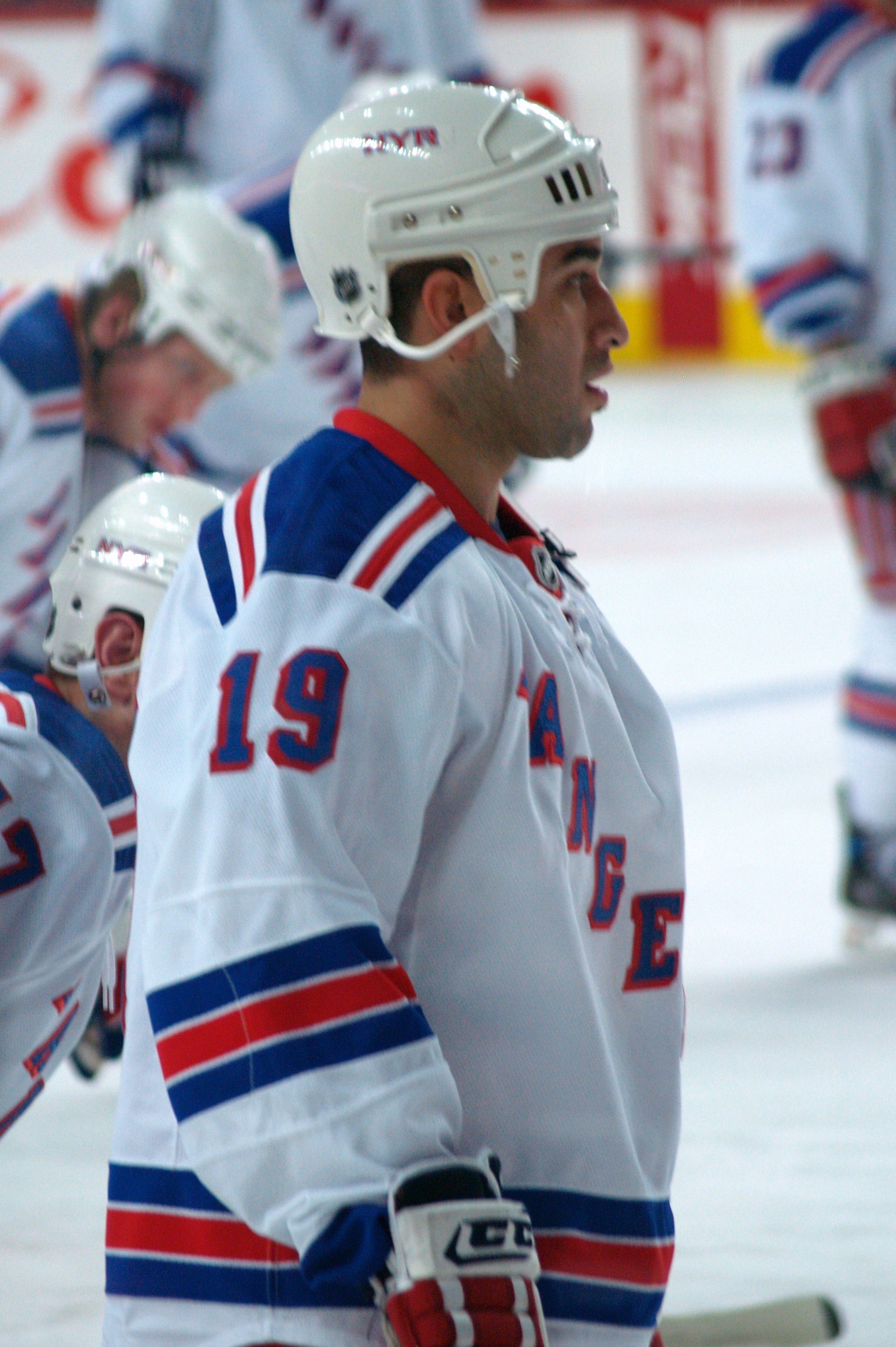
Scott Gomez played 6 games for the US in 2006, but the team failed to medal.

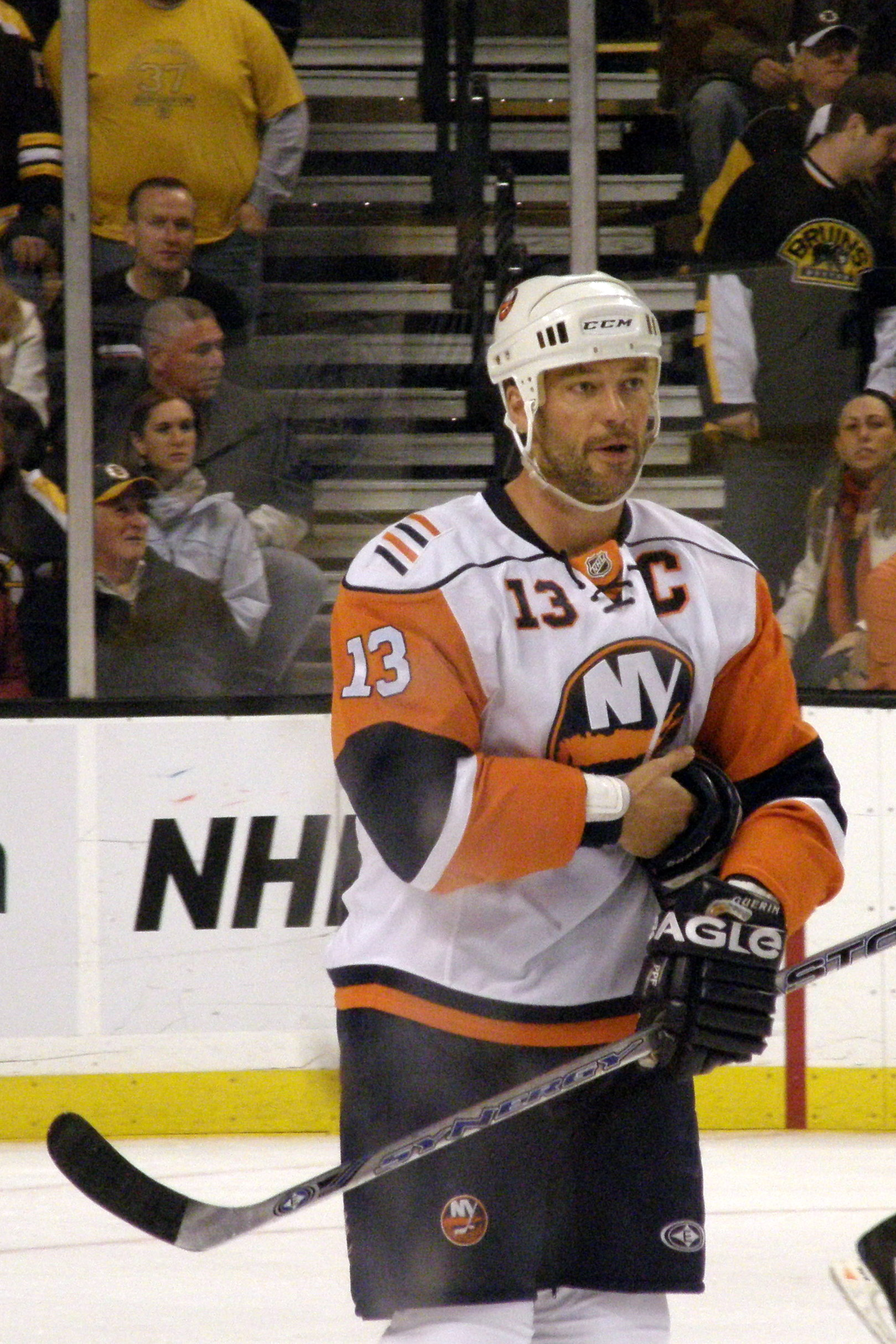
Bill Guerin participated in 3 Olympics, scoring 8 points and winning a silver medal in 2002.

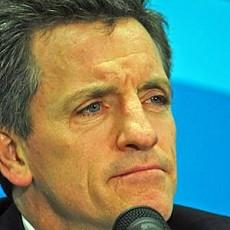
Mark Johnson was a member of the gold medal 1980 team, and later went on to coach the American women's team to a silver medal in 2010.

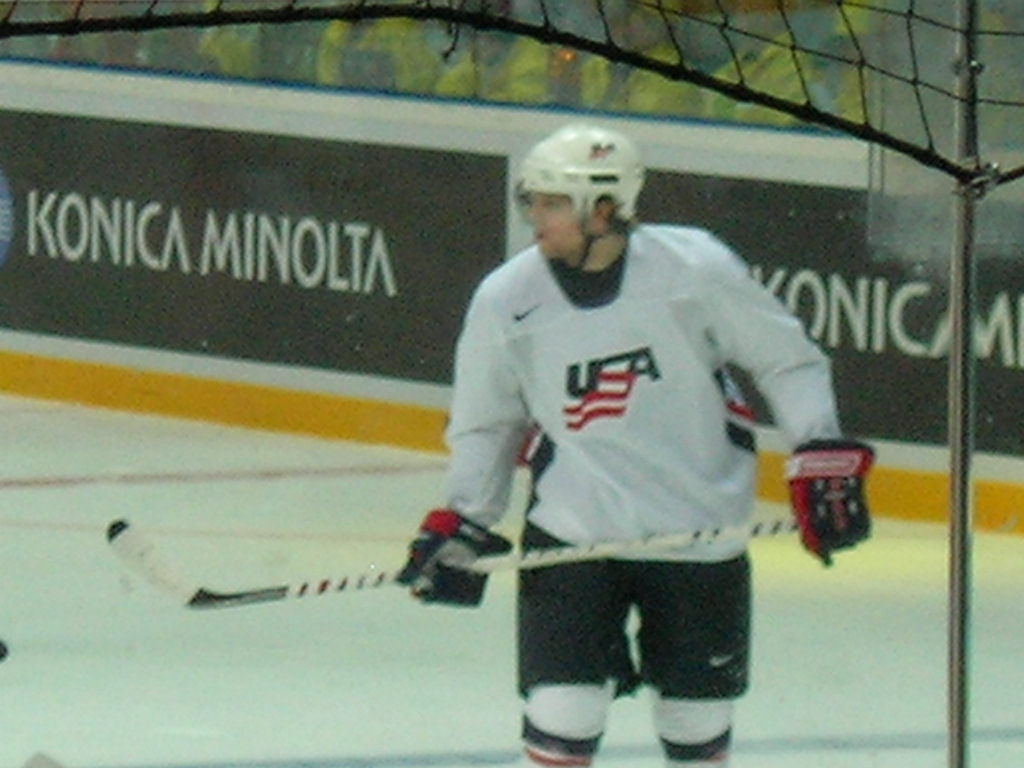
Phil Kessel scored a goal and an assist in 6 games during the 2010 Olympics.

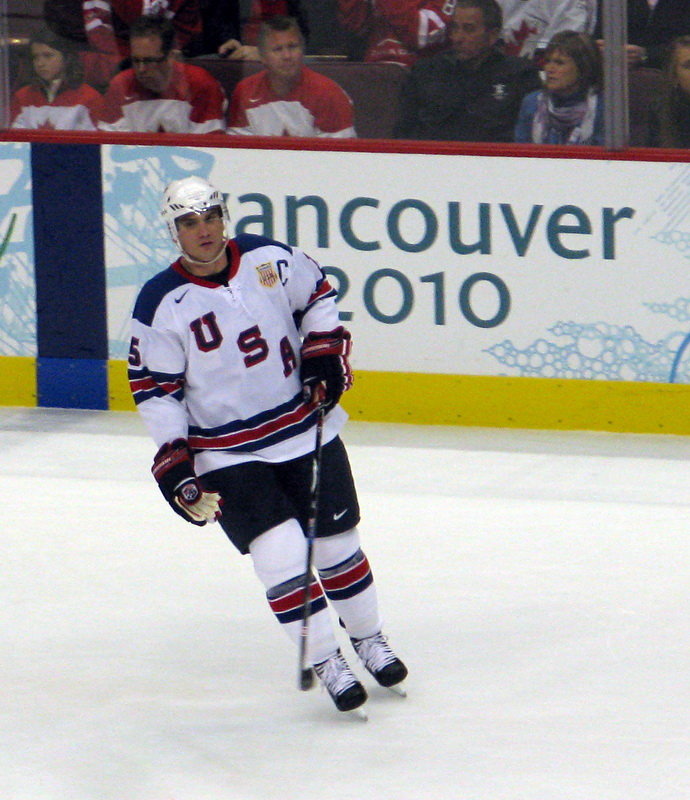
Jamie Langenbrunner was part of the 1998 team, and captained the silver medal-winning 2010 team.

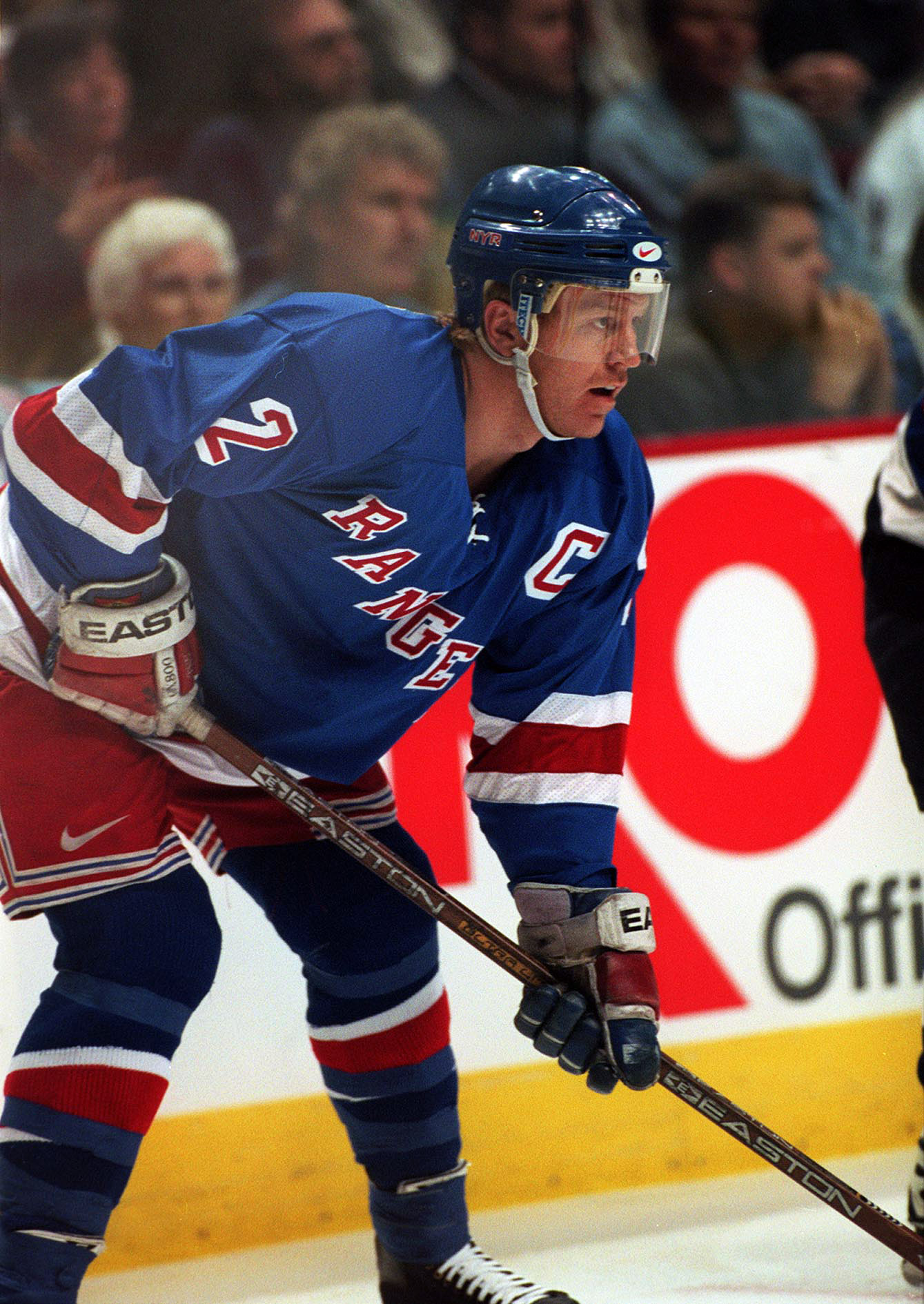
Brian Leetch is one of a handful of players to play for USA both as an amateur and a professional.

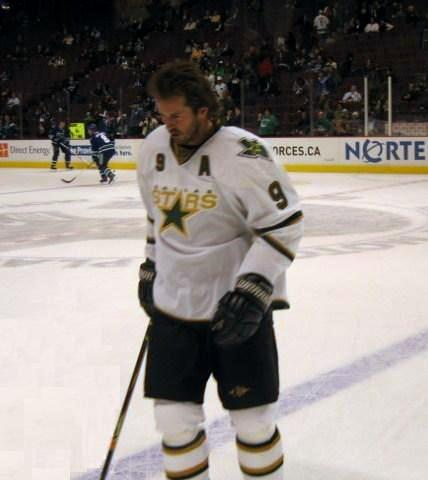
Mike Modano scored 10 points in 16 games played during 3 Olympics.

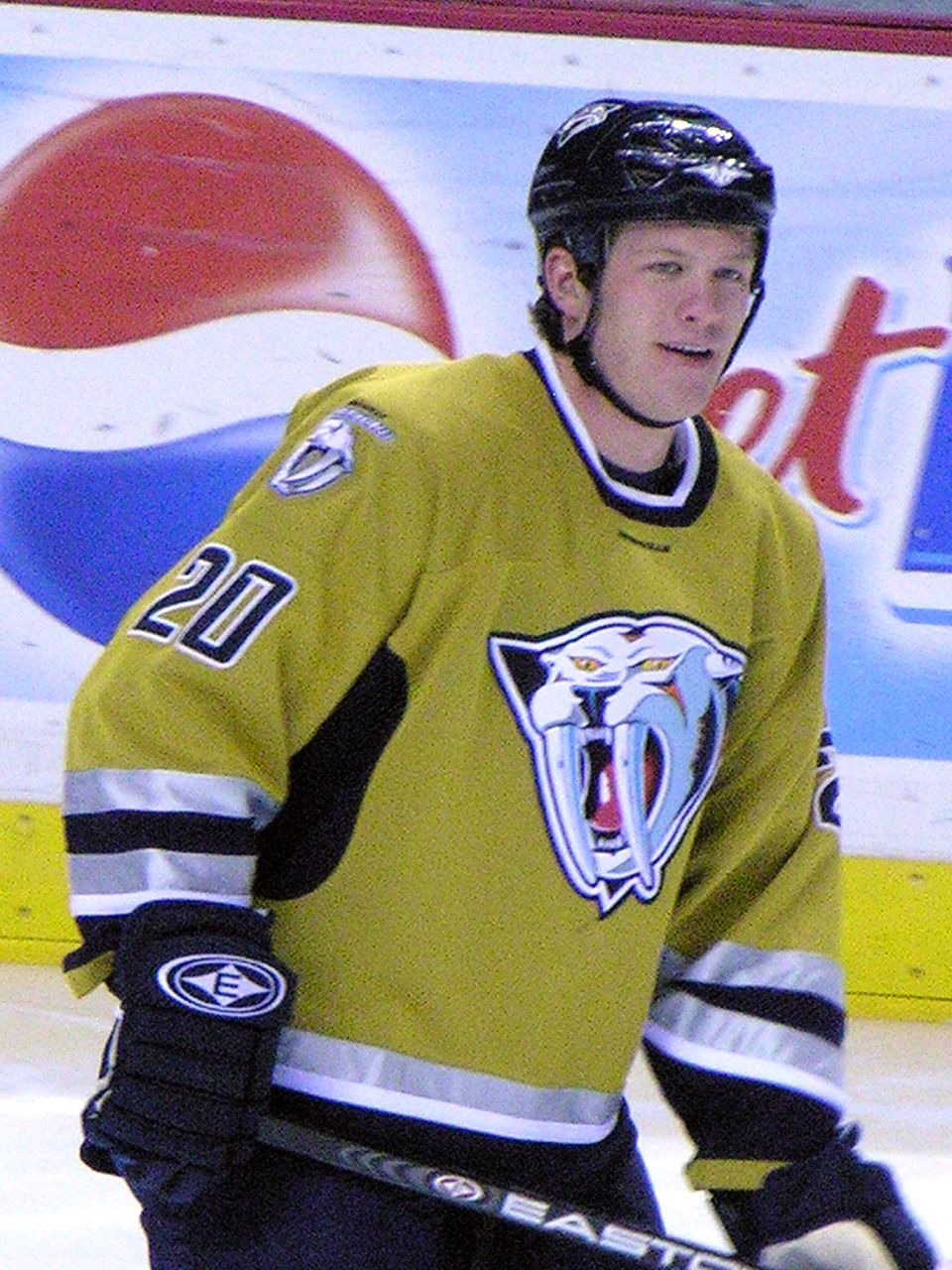
Ryan Suter is the third member of his family to medal for Team USA; his father Bob was part of the "Miracle on Ice" team in 1980, and his uncle Gary won silver in 2002.

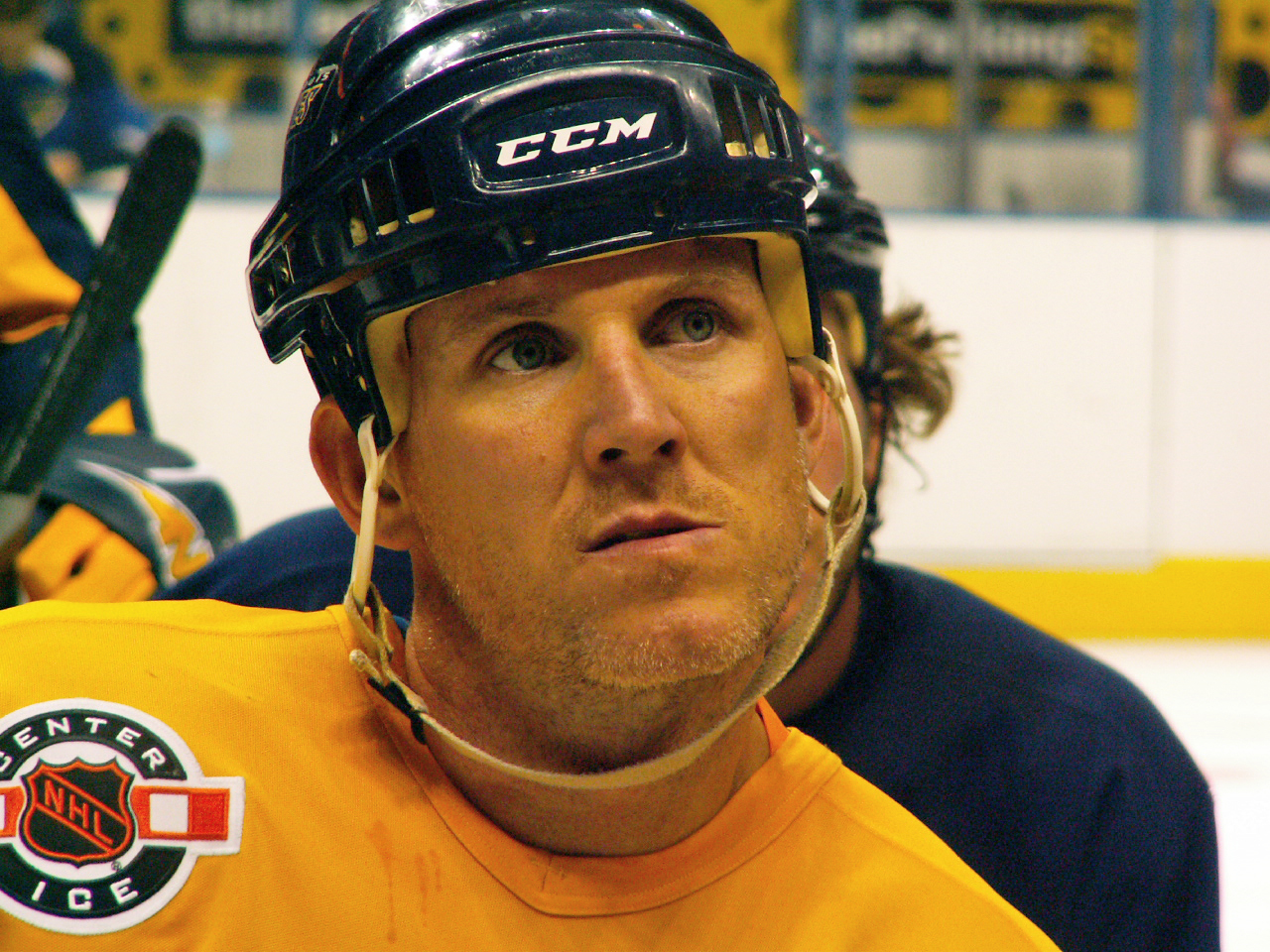
Keith Tkachuk played 23 games over four Olympic games, more than any other American player.

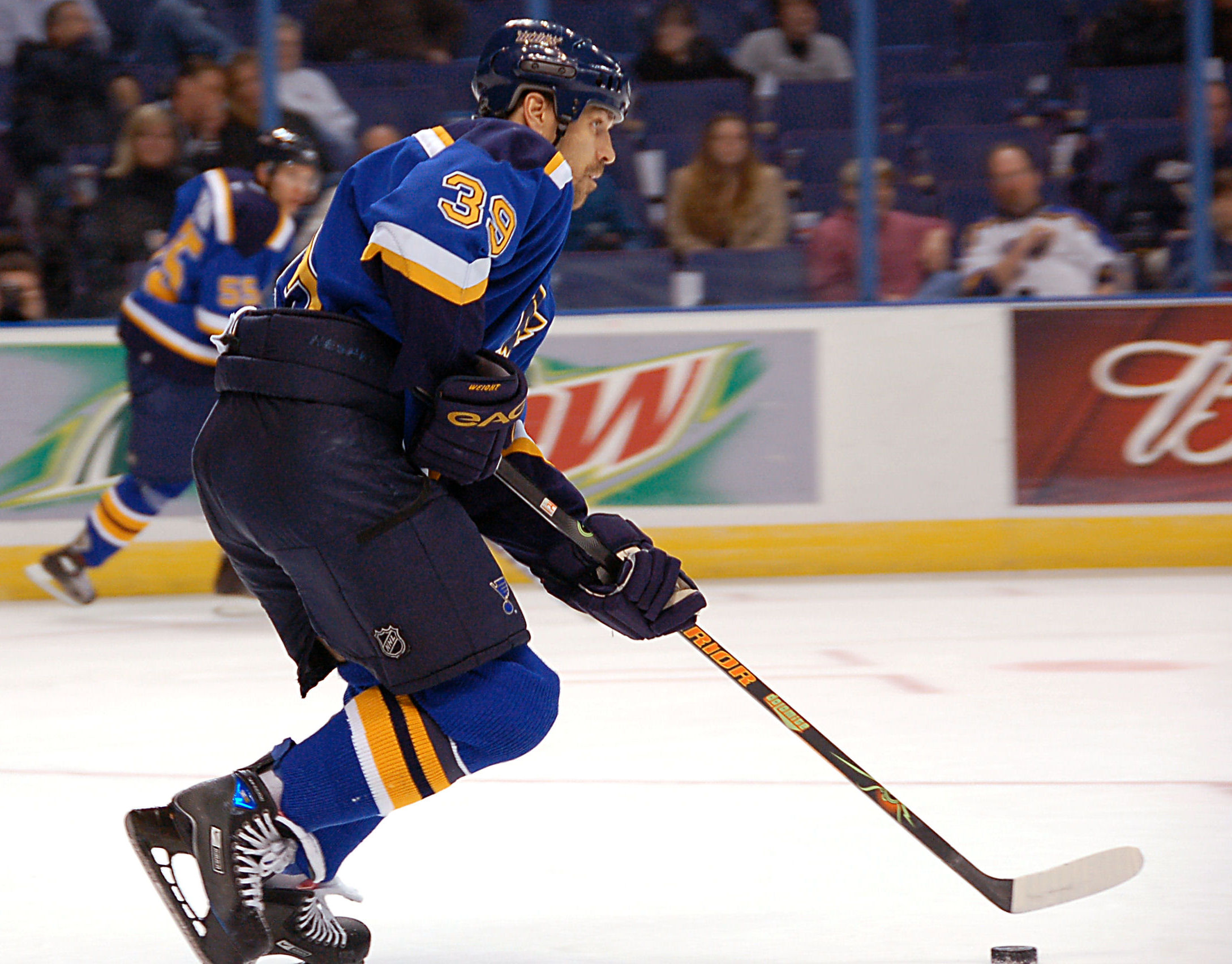
Doug Weight played for three US Olympic squads, winning silver in 2002.

Skaters
| Player | Olympics | Tournaments | GP | G | A (Note: Assists were not uniformly recorded until the 1932 tournament.) | P | PIM | Medals | Notes | Ref(s) |
|---|---|---|---|---|---|---|---|---|---|---|
| Justin Abdelkader | 1 | 2022 | 1 | 0 | 1 | 1 | 2 | | | |
| Taffy Abel | 1 | 1924 | 5 | 15 | — | 15 | 8 | Silver (1924) | Flag bearer (1924); USHHOF (1973) | |
| Nick Abruzzese | 1 | 2022 | 4 | 1 | 3 | 4 | 0 | | | |
| Kenny Agostino | 1 | 2022 | 4 | 1 | 0 | 1 | 8 | | | |
| Kevin Ahearn | 1 | 1972 | 5 | 4 | 3 | 7 | 0 | Silver (1972) | | |
| Steve Alley | 1 | 1976 | 5 | 0 | 0 | 0 | 4 | | | |
| Tony Amonte | 2 | 1998, 2002 | 10 | 2 | 3 | 5 | 4 | Silver (2002) | USHHOF (2009) | |
| Osborne Anderson | 1 | 1932 | 6 | 1 | 1 | 2 | 5 | Silver (1932) | | |
| Wendell Anderson | 1 | 1956 | 7 | 0 | 1 | 1 | 2 | Silver (1956) | | |
| Mark Arcobello | 1 | 2018 | 5 | 1 | 1 | 2 | 2 | | | |
| David Backes | 2 | 2010, 2014 | 12 | 4 | 3 | 7 | 8 | Silver (2010) | | |
| Bill Baker | 1 | 1980 | 7 | 1 | 0 | 1 | 4 | Gold (1980) | USHHOF (2003); USOHOF (1983) | |
| Bob Baker | 1 | 1948 | 8 | 7 | 2 | 9 | 2 | | | |
| Mark Beaufait | 1 | 1994 | 8 | 1 | 4 | 5 | 2 | | | |
| Matty Beniers | 1 | 2022 | 4 | 1 | 1 | 2 | 4 | | | |
| Johnny Bent | 1 | 1932 | 6 | 3 | 3 | 6 | 0 | Silver (1932) | | |
| Bryan Berard | 1 | 1998 | 2 | 0 | 0 | 0 | 0 | | | |
| Chad Billins | 1 | 2018 | 5 | 0 | 0 | 0 | 0 | | | |
| Rube Bjorkman | 1 | 1952 | 8 | 3 | 3 | 6 | 0 | Silver (1952) | | |
| Scott Bjugstad | 1 | 1984 | 6 | 3 | 1 | 4 | 6 | | | |
| Jason Blake | 1 | 2006 | 6 | 0 | 0 | 0 | 2 | | | |
| Jonathon Blum | 1 | 2018 | 5 | 0 | 0 | 0 | 0 | | | |
| Bob Boeser | 1 | 1948 | 5 | 6 | 3 | 9 | 0 | | | |
| Dan Bolduc | 1 | 1976 | 5 | 1 | 0 | 1 | 4 | | | |
| Henry Boucha | 1 | 1972 | 5 | 2 | 3 | 5 | 6 | Silver (1972) | USHHOF (1995) | |
| Allen Bourbeau | 1 | 1988 | 5 | 3 | 1 | 4 | 2 | | | |
| Chris Bourque | 1 | 2018 | 5 | 0 | 2 | 2 | 2 | | | |
| Brendan Brisson | 1 | 2022 | 4 | 2 | 0 | 2 | 0 | | | |
| Bob Brooke | 1 | 1984 | 6 | 1 | 1 | 2 | 10 | | | |
| David Brooks | 1 | 1964 | 6 | 1 | 0 | 1 | 33 | | | |
| Herb Brooks | 2 | 1964, 1968 | 14 | 1 | 3 | 4 | 6 | | HHOF (2006); IHHFHOF (1999); USHHOF (1990); USOHOF (2006); Team Co-Captain (1964) (Note: Brooks and Reichart were co-captains.) | |
| Neal Broten | 1 | 1980 | 7 | 2 | 1 | 3 | 2 | Gold (1980) | USHHOF (2000); USHHOF (2003) (Note: Broten was inducted individually in 2000, before being inducted as a member of the 1980 team in 2003.); USOHOF (1983) | |
| Charles Brown | 1 | 1972 | 5 | 0 | 0 | 0 | 6 | Silver (1972) | | |
| Dustin Brown | 2 | 2010, 2014 | 12 | 2 | 1 | 3 | 4 | Silver (2010) | | |
| Greg Brown | 2 | 1988, 1992 | 13 | 0 | 4 | 4 | 4 | | | |
| Wellington Burtnett | 1 | 1956 | 1 | 0 | 0 | 0 | 0 | Silver (1956) | | |
| Bobby Butler | 1 | 2018 | 5 | 0 | 0 | 0 | 0 | | | |
| Ryan Callahan | 2 | 2010, 2014 | 12 | 0 | 2 | 2 | 2 | Silver (2010) | | |
| Gene Campbell | 1 | 1956 | 7 | 1 | 0 | 1 | 6 | Silver (1956) | Team Captain (1956) | |
| Jim Campbell | 1 | 1994 | 8 | 0 | 0 | 0 | 6 | | | |
| John Carlson | 1 | 2014 | 6 | 1 | 1 | 2 | 0 | | | |
| Keith Carney | 1 | 1998 | 4 | 0 | 0 | 0 | 2 | | | |
| Noah Cates | 1 | 2022 | 4 | 1 | 0 | 1 | 2 | | | |
| Len Ceglarski | 1 | 1952 | 8 | 2 | 1 | 3 | 13 | Silver (1952) | USHHOF (1992) | |
| John Chase | 1 | 1932 | 6 | 2 | 4 | 6 | 1 | Silver (1932) | Team Captain (1932); USHHOF (1973) | |
| Chris Chelios | 4 | 1984, 1998, 2002, 2006 | 22 | 3 | 4 | 7 | 16 | Silver (2002) | Team Captain (1998, 2002, 2006); USHHOF (2011) | |
| Bill Christian | 2 | 1960, 1964 | 14 | 4 | 12 | 16 | 4 | Gold (1960) | IIHFHOF (1998); USHHOF (2000); USOHOF (1989) | |
| Dave Christian | 1 | 1980 | 7 | 0 | 8 | 8 | 6 | Gold (1980) | USHHOF (2003); USOHOF (1983) | |
| Gordon Christian | 1 | 1956 | 6 | 5 | 1 | 6 | 4 | Silver (1956) | | |
| Roger Christian | 2 | 1960, 1964 | 13 | 11 | 4 | 15 | 28 | Gold (1960) | USHHOF (2000); USOHOF (1989) | |
| Keith Christiansen | 1 | 1972 | 5 | 1 | 1 | 2 | 6 | Silver (1972) | USHHOF (2005) | |
| Steve Christoff | 1 | 1980 | 7 | 2 | 1 | 3 | 6 | Gold (1980) | USHHOF (2003); USOHOF (1983) | |
| Peter Ciavaglia | 1 | 1994 | 8 | 2 | 4 | 6 | 0 | | | |
| Bill Cleary | 2 | 1956, 1960 | 14 | 11 | 10 | 21 | 2 | Silver (1956); Gold (1960) | IIHFHOF (1997); USHHOF (1976); USHHOF (2000) (Note: Cleary was inducted individually in 1976, before being inducted as a member of the 1960 team in 2000.); USOHOF (1989) | |
| Bob Cleary | 1 | 1960 | 7 | 6 | 4 | 10 | 6 | Gold (1960) | USHHOF (1981); USHHOF (2000) (Note: Cleary was inducted individually in 1981, before being inducted as a member of the 1960 team in 2000.); USOHOF (1989) | |
| Erik Cole | 1 | 2006 | 6 | 1 | 2 | 3 | 0 | | | |
| Anthony Conroy | 1 | 1920 | 4 | 14 | — | 14 | 2 | Silver (1920) | USHHOF (1975) | |
| Craig Conroy | 1 | 2006 | 6 | 1 | 4 | 5 | 2 | | | |
| John Cookman | 1 | 1932 | 5 | 2 | 1 | 3 | 0 | Silver (1932) | | |
| Brian Cooper | 1 | 2022 | 4 | 0 | 1 | 1 | 0 | | | |
| Paul Coppo | 1 | 1964 | 7 | 3 | 4 | 7 | 0 | | USHHOF (2004) | |
| Ted Crowley | 1 | 1994 | 8 | 0 | 2 | 2 | 8 | | | |
| Bruce Cunliffe | 1 | 1948 | 8 | 17 | 6 | 23 | 12 | | | |
| John Cunniff | 1 | 1968 | 7 | 1 | 4 | 5 | 4 | | USHHOF (2003) | |
| Joseph Czarnota | 1 | 1952 | 8 | 2 | 2 | 4 | 35 | Silver (1952) | | |
| John Dale | 1 | 1968 | 7 | 0 | 1 | 1 | 0 | | | |
| Adam Deadmarsh | 2 | 1998, 2002 | 10 | 2 | 1 | 3 | 4 | Silver (2002) | | |
| Dan Dilworth | 1 | 1964 | 7 | 2 | 4 | 6 | 0 | | | |
| Bob Dobek | 1 | 1976 | 5 | 3 | 4 | 7 | 4 | | | |
| Clark Donatelli | 2 | 1988, 1992 | 14 | 4 | 2 | 6 | 12 | | Team Captain (1992) | |
| Ryan Donato | 1 | 2018 | 5 | 5 | 1 | 6 | 2 | | | |
| Ted Donato | 1 | 1992 | 8 | 4 | 3 | 7 | 8 | | | |
| Richard Dougherty | 1 | 1956 | 7 | 4 | 1 | 5 | 0 | Silver (1956) | USHHOF (2003) | |
| Chris Drury | 3 | 2002, 2006, 2010 | 18 | 2 | 3 | 5 | 4 | Silver (2002); Silver (2010) | | |
| Herbert Drury | 2 | 1920, 1924 | 9 | 33 | — | 33 | 5 | Silver (1920); Silver (1924) | | |
| Ted Drury | 2 | 1992, 1994 | 14 | 2 | 3 | 5 | 2 | | | |
| David Emma | 1 | 1992 | 6 | 0 | 1 | 1 | 6 | | | |
| Mike Eruzione | 1 | 1980 | 7 | 3 | 2 | 5 | 2 | Gold (1980) | USHHOF (2003); USOHOF (1983); Team Captain (1980) | |
| Doug Everett | 1 | 1932 | 5 | 4 | 0 | 4 | 0 | Silver (1932) | USHHOF (1974) | |
| Brock Faber | 1 | 2022 | 4 | 0 | 1 | 1 | 2 | | | |
| Craig Falkman | 1 | 1968 | 2 | 1 | 1 | 2 | 4 | | | |
| Sean Farrell | 1 | 2022 | 4 | 3 | 3 | 6 | 0 | | | |
| Justin Faulk | 1 | 2014 | 2 | 0 | 0 | 0 | 0 | | | |
| Peter Ferraro | 1 | 1994 | 8 | 6 | 0 | 6 | 6 | | | |
| Ed Fitzgerald | 1 | 1920 | 3 | 1 | — | 1 | 0 | Silver (1920) | | |
| Joe Fitzgerald | 1 | 1932 | 1 | 0 | 0 | 0 | 1 | Silver (1932) | | |
| Cam Fowler | 1 | 2014 | 6 | 1 | 0 | 1 | 0 | | | |
| Dates Fryberger | 1 | 1964 | 7 | 3 | 1 | 4 | 0 | | | |
| Robbie Ftorek | 1 | 1972 | 5 | 0 | 2 | 2 | 0 | Silver (1972) | USHHOF (1991) | |
| Mark Fusco | 1 | 1984 | 6 | 0 | 0 | 0 | 6 | | USHHOF (2002) | |
| Scott Fusco | 2 | 1984, 1988 | 12 | 5 | 6 | 11 | 8 | | USHHOF (2002) | |
| Andre Gambucci | 1 | 1952 | 8 | 4 | 2 | 6 | 15 | Silver (1952) | | |
| John Garrison | 2 | 1932, 1936 | 13 | 7 | 3 | 10 | 14 | Silver (1932); Bronze (1936) | USHHOF (1973); Team Captain (1936) | |
| Jack Garrity | 1 | 1948 | 3 | 1 | 1 | 2 | 4 | | USHHOF (1986) | |
| Robert Gaudreau | 1 | 1968 | 6 | 0 | 0 | 0 | 2 | | | |
| Donald Geary | 1 | 1948 | 2 | 0 | 0 | 0 | 0 | | | |
| Gerry Geran | 1 | 1920 | 2 | 3 | — | 3 | 0 | Silver (1920) | | |
| Matt Gilroy | 1 | 2018 | 5 | 0 | 1 | 1 | 2 | | | |
| Brian Gionta | 2 | 2006, 2018 | 11 | 4 | 0 | 4 | 2 | | Team Captain (2018) | |
| Tim Gleason | 1 | 2010 | 6 | 0 | 0 | 0 | 0 | Silver (2010) | | |
| Moose Goheen | 1 | 1920 | 4 | 7 | — | 7 | 7 | Silver (1920) | HHOF (1952); USHHOF (1973) | |
| Scott Gomez | 1 | 2006 | 6 | 1 | 4 | 5 | 10 | | | |
| Guy Gosselin | 2 | 1988, 1992 | 14 | 0 | 3 | 3 | 8 | | | |
| Tony Granato | 1 | 1988 | 6 | 1 | 7 | 8 | 4 | | | |
| Eugene Grazia | 1 | 1960 | 2 | 0 | 0 | 0 | 0 | Gold (1960) | USHHOF (2000); USOHOF (1989) | |
| Jordan Greenway | 1 | 2018 | 5 | 1 | 0 | 1 | 10 | | | |
| Steve Griffith | 1 | 1984 | 5 | 0 | 0 | 0 | 0 | | | |
| Paul Guay | 1 | 1984 | 6 | 1 | 0 | 1 | 8 | | | |
| Bill Guerin | 3 | 1998, 2002, 2006 | 16 | 5 | 3 | 8 | 6 | Silver (2002) | USHHOF (2013) | |
| Ryan Gunderson | 1 | 2018 | 5 | 0 | 0 | 0 | 0 | | | |
| Gerard Hallock | 1 | 1932 | 1 | 0 | 0 | 0 | 0 | Silver (1932) | | |
| John Harrington | 2 | 1980, 1984 | 12 | 0 | 5 | 5 | 8 | Gold (1980) | USHHOF (2003); USOHOF (1983) | |
| Bob Harris | 1 | 1976 | 5 | 1 | 0 | 1 | 2 | | | |
| Clifford Harrison | 1 | 1952 | 8 | 5 | 2 | 7 | 4 | Silver (1952) | | |
| Derian Hatcher | 2 | 1998, 2006 | 10 | 0 | 0 | 0 | 12 | | USHHOF (2010) | |
| Kevin Hatcher | 1 | 1998 | 3 | 0 | 2 | 2 | 0 | | USHHOF (2010) | |
| Brett Hauer | 1 | 1994 | 8 | 0 | 0 | 0 | 10 | | | |
| Bret Hedican | 2 | 1992, 2006 | 14 | 0 | 1 | 1 | 10 | | | |
| Steve Heinze | 1 | 1992 | 8 | 1 | 3 | 4 | 8 | | | |
| Drew Helleson | 1 | 2022 | 3 | 0 | 1 | 1 | 0 | | | |
| Darby Hendrickson | 1 | 1994 | 8 | 0 | 0 | 0 | 6 | | | |
| Sam Hentges | 1 | 2022 | 2 | 1 | 0 | 1 | 0 | | | |
| Sean Hill | 1 | 1992 | 8 | 2 | 0 | 2 | 6 | | | |
| Tom Hirsch | 1 | 1984 | 6 | 1 | 0 | 1 | 10 | | | |
| Phil Housley | 1 | 2002 | 6 | 1 | 4 | 5 | 0 | Silver (2002) | USHHOF (2004) | |
| Mark Howe | 1 | 1972 | 5 | 0 | 0 | 0 | 0 | Silver (1972) | USHHOF (2003); HHOF (2011) | |
| Brett Hull | 2 | 1998, 2002 | 10 | 5 | 6 | 11 | 6 | Silver (2002) | HHOF (2009); USHHOF (2008) | |
| Paul Hurley | 1 | 1968 | 7 | 3 | 3 | 6 | 0 | | | |
| Tom Hurley | 1 | 1968 | 7 | 0 | 2 | 2 | 2 | | | |
| Jeff Hymanson | 1 | 1976 | 5 | 0 | 0 | 0 | 4 | | | |
| Al Iafrate | 1 | 1984 | 6 | 0 | 0 | 0 | 2 | | | |
| Chris Imes | 1 | 1994 | 8 | 0 | 0 | 0 | 2 | | | |
| Stu Irving | 1 | 1972 | 5 | 1 | 1 | 2 | 6 | Silver (1972) | | |
| Craig Janney | 1 | 1988 | 5 | 3 | 1 | 4 | 2 | | | |
| David A. Jensen | 1 | 1984 | 6 | 5 | 1 | 6 | 0 | | | |
| David H. Jensen | 1 | 1984 | 6 | 0 | 0 | 0 | 6 | | | |
| Paul Jensen | 1 | 1976 | 5 | 0 | 0 | 0 | 4 | | | |
| Steve Jensen | 1 | 1972 | 5 | 5 | 0 | 5 | 6 | Silver (1972) | | |
| Jim Johannson | 2 | 1988, 1992 | 13 | 1 | 1 | 2 | 6 | | | |
| Erik Johnson | 1 | 2010 | 6 | 1 | 0 | 1 | 4 | Silver (2010) | | |
| Jack Johnson | 1 | 2010 | 6 | 0 | 1 | 1 | 2 | Silver (2010) | | |
| Mark Johnson | 1 | 1980 | 7 | 5 | 6 | 11 | 6 | Gold (1980) | IIHFHOF (1999); USHHOF (2003); USHHOF (2004) (Note: Johnson was inducted as a member of the 1980 team, before being inducted individually in 2004.); USOHOF (1983) | |
| Paul Johnson | 2 | 1960, 1964 | 14 | 11 | 3 | 14 | 8 | Gold (1960) | USHHOF (2000); USHHOF (2001) (Note: Johnson was inducted as a member of the 1960 team, before being inducted individually in 2001.); USOHOF (1989) | |
| August Kammer | 1 | 1936 | 1 | 0 | 0 | 0 | 0 | Bronze (1936) | | |
| Steven Kampfer | 1 | 2022 | 4 | 1 | 3 | 4 | 2 | | | |
| Patrick Kane | 2 | 2010, 2014 | 12 | 3 | 6 | 9 | 8 | Silver (2010) | | |
| Ryan Kesler | 2 | 2010, 2014 | 12 | 3 | 3 | 6 | 2 | Silver (2010) | | |
| Phil Kessel | 2 | 2010, 2014 | 12 | 6 | 4 | 10 | 4 | Silver (2010) | | |
| Gerald Kilmartin | 1 | 1952 | 7 | 2 | 4 | 6 | 6 | Silver (1952) | | |
| Jack Kirrane | 2 | 1948, 1960 | 14 | 5 | 4 | 9 | 11 | Gold (1960) | IIHFHOF (1997); USHHOF (1987); USHHOF(2000) (Note: Kirrane was inducted individually in 1987, before being inducted as a member of the 1960 team in 2000.); USOHOF (1989); Team Captain (1960) | |
| Matthew Knies | 1 | 2022 | 4 | 1 | 1 | 2 | 2 | | | |
| Mike Knuble | 1 | 2006 | 6 | 1 | 1 | 2 | 4 | | | |
| Chad Kolarik | 1 | 2018 | 2 | 0 | 0 | 0 | 0 | | | |
| Philip LaBatte | 1 | 1936 | 5 | 0 | 2 | 2 | 6 | Bronze (1936) | | |
| Scott Lachance | 1 | 1992 | 8 | 0 | 1 | 1 | 6 | | | |
| Pat LaFontaine | 2 | 1984, 1998 | 10 | 6 | 4 | 10 | 0 | | USHHOF (2003) | |
| Dick Lamby | 1 | 1976 | 5 | 0 | 2 | 2 | 10 | | | |
| Jamie Langenbrunner | 2 | 1998, 2010 | 9 | 1 | 3 | 4 | 4 | Silver (2010) | Team Captain (2010) | |
| Peter Laviolette | 1 | 1988, 1994 | 13 | 1 | 2 | 3 | 10 | | Team Captain (1994) | |
| John Lax | 1 | 1936 | 3 | 0 | 0 | 0 | 2 | Bronze (1936) | | |
| Jeff Lazaro | 1 | 1994 | 8 | 2 | 2 | 4 | 4 | | | |
| Stephen Leach | 1 | 1988 | 6 | 1 | 2 | 3 | 0 | | | |
| John LeClair | 2 | 1998, 2002 | 10 | 6 | 2 | 8 | 4 | Silver (2002) | USHHOF (2009) | |
| Brian Leetch | 3 | 1988, 1998, 2002 | 16 | 2 | 11 | 13 | 4 | Silver (2002) | USHHOF (2008); Team Captain (1988) | |
| Jordan Leopold | 1 | 2006 | 6 | 1 | 0 | 1 | 4 | | | |
| John-Michael Liles | 1 | 2006 | 6 | 0 | 2 | 2 | 2 | | | |
| John Lilley | 1 | 1994 | 8 | 3 | 1 | 4 | 16 | | | |
| Leonard Lilyholm | 1 | 1968 | 7 | 2 | 2 | 4 | 9 | | | |
| Broc Little | 1 | 2018 | 5 | 0 | 1 | 1 | 0 | | | |
| Bob Livingston | 1 | 1932 | 1 | 0 | 0 | 0 | 0 | Silver (1932) | | |
| Bob Lundeen | 1 | 1976 | 5 | 0 | 0 | 0 | 2 | | | |
| John Lyons | 1 | 1924 | 1 | 0 | — | 0 | 0 | Silver (1924) | | |
| Lane MacDonald | 1 | 1988 | 6 | 6 | 1 | 7 | 4 | | USHHOF (2005) | |
| Ryan Malone | 1 | 2010 | 6 | 3 | 2 | 5 | 6 | Silver (2010) | | |
| Moe Mantha | 1 | 1992 | 8 | 1 | 1 | 2 | 4 | | | |
| Todd Marchant | 1 | 1994 | 8 | 1 | 1 | 2 | 6 | | | |
| Matt Martin | 1 | 1994 | 8 | 0 | 2 | 2 | 8 | | | |
| Paul Martin | 1 | 2014 | 4 | 0 | 0 | 0 | 0 | | | |
| Red Martin | 1 | 1964 | 7 | 0 | 0 | 0 | 6 | | | |
| John Matchefts | 1 | 1956 | 7 | 2 | 2 | 4 | 2 | Silver (1956) | USHHOF (1991) | |
| Bruce Mather | 1 | 1948 | 8 | 15 | 8 | 23 | 8 | | USHHOF (1998) | |
| John Mayasich | 2 | 1956, 1960 | 14 | 14 | 8 | 22 | 4 | Silver (1956); Gold (1960) | USHHOF (1976); USHHOF (2000) (Note: Mayasich was inducted individually in 1976, before being inducted as a member of the 1960 team in 2000.); USOHOF (1989) | |
| Justin McCarthy | 1 | 1924 | 5 | 8 | — | 8 | 0 | Silver (1924) | | |
| John McCarthy | 5 | 0 | 0 | 0 | 2 | | | | | |
| Rob McClanahan | 1 | 1980 | 7 | 5 | 3 | 8 | 2 | Gold (1980) | USHHOF (2003); USOHOF (1983) | |
| Joe McCormick | 1 | 1920 | 3 | 8 | — | 8 | 5 | Silver (1920) | | |
| Lawrence McCormick | 1 | 1920 | 1 | 7 | — | 7 | 0 | Silver (1920) | | |
| Jim McCoy | 1 | 1964 | 3 | 0 | 0 | 0 | 0 | | | |
| Ryan McDonagh | 1 | 2014 | 6 | 1 | 1 | 2 | 0 | | | |
| Shawn McEachern | 1 | 1992 | 8 | 1 | 0 | 1 | 10 | | | |
| Jim McElmury | 1 | 1972 | 5 | 0 | 1 | 1 | 6 | Silver (1972) | | |
| Dick McGlynn | 1 | 1972 | 5 | 0 | 0 | 0 | 2 | Silver (1972) | | |
| Marty McInnis | 1 | 1992 | 8 | 5 | 2 | 7 | 4 | | | |
| Dan McKinnon | 1 | 1956 | 6 | 1 | 1 | 2 | 4 | Silver (1956) | | |
| Marc McLaughlin | 1 | 2022 | 2 | 0 | 0 | 0 | 0 | | | |
| Robert McVey | 1 | 1960 | 6 | 2 | 4 | 6 | 12 | Gold (1960) | USHHOF (2000); USOHOF (1989) | |
| Tom Mellor | 1 | 1972 | 5 | 0 | 0 | 0 | 2 | Silver (1972) | | |
| Dick Meredith | 2 | 1956, 1960 | 9 | 4 | 4 | 8 | 2 | Silver (1956); Gold (1960) | USHHOF (2000); USOHOF (1989) | |
| Wayne Meredith | 1 | 1964 | 4 | 0 | 0 | 0 | 8 | | | |
| Ben Meyers | 1 | 2022 | 4 | 2 | 2 | 4 | 0 | | | |
| Andy Miele | 1 | 2022 | 4 | 1 | 3 | 4 | 0 | | Team Captain (2022) | |
| Corey Millen | 2 | 1984, 1988 | 12 | 6 | 5 | 11 | 6 | | | |
| Aaron Miller | 1 | 2002 | 6 | 0 | 0 | 0 | 4 | Silver (2002) | | |
| Bob Miller | 1 | 1976 | 5 | 0 | 1 | 1 | 0 | | | |
| Kevin Miller | 1 | 1988 | 5 | 1 | 3 | 4 | 4 | | | |
| Mike Modano | 3 | 1998, 2002, 2006 | 16 | 4 | 6 | 10 | 10 | Silver (2002) | USHHOF (2012) | |
| John Morrison | 1 | 1968 | 7 | 2 | 6 | 8 | 10 | | | |
| Ken Morrow | 1 | 1980 | 7 | 1 | 2 | 3 | 6 | Gold (1980) | USHHOF (1995); USHHOF (2003) (Note: Morrow was inducted individually in 1995, before being inducted as a member of the 1980 team in 2003.); USOHOF (1983) | |
| John Mulhern | 1 | 1952 | 8 | 5 | 1 | 6 | 4 | Silver (1952) | | |
| Lou Nanne | 1 | 1968 | 7 | 2 | 2 | 4 | 12 | | IIHFHOF (2004); USHHOF (1998); Team Captain (1968) | |
| Ronald Naslund | 1 | 1972 | 5 | 1 | 1 | 2 | 2 | Silver (1972) | | |
| Francis Nelson | 1 | 1932 | 5 | 1 | 1 | 2 | 2 | Silver (1932) | | |
| Aaron Ness | 1 | 2022 | 4 | 0 | 1 | 1 | 2 | | | |
| John Noah | 1 | 1952 | 8 | 0 | 1 | 1 | 0 | Silver (1952) | | |
| Jeff Norton | 1 | 1988 | 6 | 0 | 4 | 4 | 4 | | | |
| Jack O'Callahan | 1 | 1980 | 5 | 0 | 1 | 1 | 2 | Gold (1980) | USHHOF (2003); USOHOF (1983) | |
| Brian O'Neill | 2 | 2018, 2022 | 9 | 2 | 5 | 7 | 0 | | | |
| Todd Okerlund | 1 | 1988 | 3 | 1 | 0 | 1 | 4 | | | |
| Ed Olczyk | 1 | 1984 | 6 | 2 | 6 | 8 | 0 | | USHHOF (2012) | |
| Wally Olds | 1 | 1972 | 5 | 0 | 0 | 0 | 0 | Silver (1972) | | |
| Weldon Olson | 2 | 1956, 1960 | 14 | 7 | 0 | 7 | 16 | Silver (1956); Gold (1960) | USHHOF (2000); USOHOF (1989) | |
| Al Opsahl | 1 | 1948 | 8 | 1 | 1 | 2 | 4 | | | |
| Brooks Orpik | 2 | 2010, 2014 | 12 | 0 | 0 | 0 | 2 | Silver (2010) | | |
| T. J. Oshie | 1 | 2014 | 6 | 1 | 3 | 4 | 4 | | | |
| Arnold Oss | 1 | 1952 | 8 | 7 | 4 | 11 | 0 | Silver (1952) | | |
| Joel Otto | 1 | 1998 | 4 | 0 | 0 | 0 | 0 | | | |
| Edwyn Owen | 1 | 1960 | 7 | 1 | 2 | 3 | 4 | Gold (1960) | USHHOF (2000); USOHOF (1989) | |
| Rodney Paavola | 1 | 1960 | 7 | 0 | 1 | 1 | 4 | Gold (1960) | USHHOF (2000); USOHOF (1989) | |
| Max Pacioretty | 1 | 2014 | 5 | 0 | 1 | 1 | 4 | | | |
| Winthrop Palmer | 1 | 1932 | 6 | 8 | 3 | 11 | 2 | Silver (1932) | USHHOF (1973) | |
| Bob Paradise | 1 | 1968 | 6 | 0 | 0 | 0 | 0 | | USHHOF (1989) | |
| Zach Parise | 2 | 2010, 2014 | 12 | 5 | 4 | 9 | 0 | Silver (2010) | | |
| Mark Parrish | 1 | 2006 | 6 | 0 | 0 | 0 | 4 | | | |
| Mark Pavelich | 1 | 1980 | 7 | 1 | 6 | 7 | 2 | Gold (1980) | USHHOF (2003); USOHOF (1983) | |
| Joe Pavelski | 2 | 2010, 2014 | 12 | 1 | 7 | 8 | 4 | Silver (2010) | | |
| Fred Pearson | 1 | 1948 | 6 | 2 | 4 | 6 | 6 | | | |
| Nick Perbix | 1 | 2022 | 4 | 0 | 1 | 1 | 0 | | | |
| John Petroske | 1 | 1956 | 7 | 0 | 0 | 0 | 4 | Silver (1956) | | |
| Larry Pleau | 1 | 1968 | 7 | 2 | 4 | 6 | 2 | | USHHOF (2000) | |
| Tom Poti | 1 | 2002 | 6 | 0 | 1 | 1 | 4 | Silver (2002) | | |
| Stan Priddy | 1 | 1948 | 8 | 1 | 0 | 1 | 2 | | | |
| Ken Purpur | 1 | 1956 | 7 | 2 | 2 | 4 | 2 | Silver (1956) | USHHOF (1974) | |
| Brian Rafalski | 3 | 2002, 2006, 2010 | 17 | 5 | 8 | 13 | 4 | Silver (2002); Silver (2010) | Tournament best defenseman (2010) | |
| Mike Ramsey | 1 | 1980 | 7 | 0 | 2 | 2 | 8 | Gold (1980) | USHHOF (2001); USHHOF (2003) (Note: Ramsey was inducted individually in 2001, before being inducted as a member of the 1980 team in 2003.); USOHOF (1983) | |
| Bill Reichart | 1 | 1964 | 7 | 3 | 3 | 6 | 4 | | Team Co-Captain (1964) | |
| Willard Rice | 1 | 1924 | 5 | 13 | — | 13 | 0 | Silver (1924) | | |
| Travis Richards | 1 | 1994 | 8 | 0 | 0 | 0 | 2 | | | |
| Barry Richter | 1 | 1994 | 8 | 0 | 3 | 3 | 4 | | | |
| Jack Riley | 1 | 1948 | 8 | 17 | 0 | 17 | 11 | | USHHOF (1979) | |
| Bruce Riutta | 1 | 1968 | 7 | 1 | 1 | 2 | 10 | | | |
| David Roberts | 1 | 1994 | 8 | 1 | 5 | 6 | 4 | | | |
| Richard Rodenheiser | 2 | 1956, 1960 | 6 | 1 | 1 | 2 | 0 | Silver (1956); Gold (1960) | USHHOF (2000); USOHOF (1989) | |
| Garrett Roe | 1 | 2018 | 5 | 1 | 1 | 2 | 0 | | | |
| Jeremy Roenick | 2 | 1998, 2002 | 10 | 1 | 5 | 6 | 8 | Silver (2002) | USHHOF (2010) | |
| Brian Rolston | 3 | 1994, 2002, 2006 | 20 | 10 | 4 | 14 | 12 | Silver (2002) | | |
| Robert Rompre | 1 | 1952 | 8 | 5 | 3 | 8 | 4 | Silver (1952) | | |
| Donald Ross | 2 | 1964, 1968 | 14 | 2 | 2 | 4 | 2 | | | |
| Doug Ross | 1 | 1976 | 5 | 0 | 2 | 2 | 0 | | | |
| Elbridge Ross | 1 | 1936 | 8 | 1 | 0 | 1 | 2 | Bronze (1936) | | |
| Gary Ross | 1 | 1976 | 5 | 1 | 3 | 4 | 6 | | | |
| Paul Rowe | 1 | 1936 | 8 | 2 | 1 | 3 | 2 | Bronze (1936) | | |
| Bobby Ryan | 1 | 2010 | 6 | 1 | 1 | 2 | 2 | Silver (2010) | | |
| David Sacco | 1 | 1994 | 8 | 3 | 5 | 8 | 12 | | | |
| Joe Sacco | 1 | 1992 | 8 | 0 | 2 | 2 | 0 | | | |
| Gary Sampson | 1 | 1984 | 6 | 1 | 2 | 3 | 2 | | | |
| Ed Sampson | 1 | 1956 | 7 | 0 | 0 | 0 | 8 | Silver (1956) | | |
| Frank Sanders | 1 | 1972 | 5 | 3 | 0 | 3 | 0 | Silver (1972) | | |
| Jake Sanderson | 1 | 2022 | 1 | 0 | 1 | 1 | 0 | | | |
| Bobby Sanguinetti | 1 | 2018 | 5 | 0 | 1 | 1 | 2 | | | |
| Craig Sarner | 1 | 1972 | 5 | 4 | 5 | 9 | 0 | Silver (1972) | | |
| Gary Schmalzbauer | 1 | 1964 | 7 | 3 | 0 | 3 | 0 | | | |
| Buzz Schneider | 2 | 1976, 1980 | 12 | 7 | 4 | 11 | 10 | Gold (1980) | USHHOF (2003); USOHOF (1983) | |
| Mathieu Schneider | 2 | 1998, 2006 | 10 | 1 | 2 | 3 | 22 | | | |
| James Sedin | 1 | 1952 | 8 | 2 | 2 | 4 | 2 | Silver (1952) | | |
| Steve Sertich | 1 | 1976 | 5 | 1 | 2 | 3 | 0 | | | |
| Kevin Shattenkirk | 1 | 2014 | 6 | 0 | 3 | 3 | 0 | | | |
| Francis Shaughnessy | 1 | 1936 | 8 | 0 | 0 | 0 | 4 | Bronze (1936) | | |
| Tim Sheehy | 1 | 1972 | 5 | 2 | 1 | 3 | 0 | Silver (1972) | USHHOF (1997); Team Captain (1972) | |
| Nick Shore | 1 | 2022 | 3 | 0 | 1 | 1 | 0 | | | |
| Dave Silk | 1 | 1980 | 7 | 2 | 3 | 5 | 0 | Gold (1980) | USHHOF (2003); USOHOF (1983) | |
| Jim Slater | 1 | 2018 | 3 | 1 | 0 | 1 | 0 | | | |
| Irving Small | 1 | 1924 | 5 | 8 | — | 8 | 0 | Silver (1924) | Team Captain (1924) | |
| Gordon Smith | 2 | 1932, 1936 | 9 | 2 | 0 | 2 | 0 | Silver (1932); Bronze (1936) | | |
| Nathan Smith | 1 | 2022 | 4 | 1 | 1 | 2 | 1 | | | |
| Dave Snuggerud | 1 | 1988 | 6 | 3 | 2 | 5 | 4 | | | |
| Francis Spain | 1 | 1936 | 8 | 2 | 0 | 2 | 4 | Bronze (1936) | | |
| Paul Stastny | 2 | 2010, 2014 | 12 | 3 | 2 | 5 | 0 | Silver (2010) | | |
| Derek Stepan | 1 | 2014 | 1 | 0 | 0 | 0 | 0 | | | |
| Kevin Stevens | 1 | 1988 | 5 | 1 | 3 | 4 | 2 | | | |
| Ryan Stoa | 1 | 2018 | 5 | 0 | 0 | 0 | 0 | | | |
| Larry Stordahl | 1 | 1968 | 7 | 2 | 0 | 2 | 8 | | | |
| Eric Strobel | 1 | 1980 | 7 | 1 | 2 | 3 | 2 | Gold (1980) | USHHOF (2003); USOHOF (1983) | |
| Frank Stubbs | 1 | 1936 | 8 | 0 | 1 | 1 | 4 | Bronze (1936) | | |
| Bob Suter | 1 | 1980 | 7 | 0 | 0 | 0 | 6 | Gold (1980) | USHHOF (2003); USOHOF (1983) | |
| Gary Suter | 1 | 1998, 2002 | 10 | 0 | 1 | 1 | 4 | Silver (2002) | USHHOF (2011) | |
| Ryan Suter | 2 | 2010, 2014 | 12 | 0 | 7 | 7 | 6 | Silver (2010) | | |
| Tim Sweeney | 1 | 1992 | 8 | 3 | 4 | 7 | 6 | | | |
| Frank Synott | 2 | 1920, 1924 | 6 | 7 | — | 7 | 3 | Silver (1920); Silver (1924) | | |
| John Taft | 1 | 1976 | 5 | 1 | 2 | 3 | 8 | | Team Captain (1976) | |
| Troy Terry | 1 | 2018 | 5 | 0 | 5 | 5 | 4 | | | |
| Ted Thorndike | 1 | 1976 | 5 | 0 | 2 | 2 | 0 | | | |
| Keith Tkachuk | 4 | 1992, 1998, 2002, 2006 | 23 | 3 | 3 | 6 | 28 | Silver (2002) | USHHOF (2011) | |
| Dave Tretowicz | 1 | 1992 | 8 | 0 | 0 | 0 | 0 | | | |
| Leon Tuck | 1 | 1920 | 2 | 1 | — | 1 | 0 | Silver (1920) | | |
| Allen Van | 1 | 1952 | 8 | 0 | 1 | 1 | 4 | Silver (1952) | Team Captain (1952) | |
| James van Riemsdyk | 1 | 2014 | 6 | 1 | 6 | 7 | 2 | | | |
| Herb Vaningen | 1 | 1948 | 2 | 0 | 0 | 0 | 2 | | | |
| Phil Verchota | 2 | 1980, 1984 | 13 | 5 | 4 | 9 | 8 | Gold (1980) | USHHOF (2003); USOHOF (1983); Team Captain (1984) | |
| Doug Volmar | 1 | 1968 | 7 | 5 | 0 | 5 | 4 | | | |
| Ralph Warburton | 1 | 1948 | 8 | 16 | 5 | 21 | 6 | | | |
| David Warsofsky | 1 | 2022 | 4 | 0 | 0 | 0 | 0 | | | |
| Doug Weight | 3 | 1998, 2002, 2006 | 16 | 0 | 8 | 8 | 10 | Silver (2002) | USHHOF (2013) | |
| Eric Weinrich | 1 | 1988 | 3 | 0 | 0 | 0 | 0 | | | |
| Noah Welch | 1 | 2018 | 5 | 0 | 0 | 0 | 4 | | | |
| Mark Wells | 1 | 1980 | 7 | 2 | 1 | 3 | 0 | Gold (1980) | USHHOF (2003); USOHOF (1983) | |
| Jim Westby | 1 | 1964 | 7 | 2 | 0 | 2 | 4 | | | |
| Blake Wheeler | 1 | 2014 | 6 | 0 | 1 | 1 | 2 | | | |
| Ryan Whitney | 1 | 2010 | 6 | 0 | 0 | 0 | 0 | Silver (2010) | | |
| Tom Williams | 1 | 1960 | 7 | 4 | 6 | 10 | 2 | Gold (1960) | USHHOF (1981); USHHOF (2000) (Note: Williams was inducted individually in 1981, before being inducted as a member of the 1960 team in 2000.); USOHOF (1989) | |
| James Wisniewski | 1 | 2018 | 5 | 1 | 1 | 2 | 2 | | | |
| Ken Yackel | 1 | 1952 | 8 | 6 | 3 | 9 | 13 | Silver (1952) | USHHOF (1986) | |
| Mike York | 1 | 2002 | 6 | 0 | 1 | 1 | 0 | Silver (2002) | | |
| C. J. Young | 1 | 1992 | 8 | 1 | 3 | 4 | 4 | | | |
| Scott Young | 3 | 1988, 1992, 2002 | 20 | 8 | 7 | 15 | 8 | Silver (2002) | | |

== See also ==
- List of United States national ice hockey team rosters
- List of Olympic women's ice hockey players for the United States
