= Ralph Warburton =

American ice hockey player (1924–2021)

- Born: January 7, 1924 Cranston, Rhode Island, U.S.
- Died: December 25, 2021 (aged 97) Wakefield, Rhode Island, U.S.
- Height: 5 ft 8 in (173 cm)
- Weight: 160 lb (73 kg; 11 st 6 lb)
- Position: Right wing
- Shot: Right
- Played for: Worcester Warriors; Milwaukee Clarks; Boston Olympics
- National team: United States
- Playing career: 1943–1955

Ralph Arthur Warburton (January 7, 1924 − December 25, 2021) was an American ice hockey right wing and was a member of the United States national team at the 1948 Winter Olympics.

== Playing career ==
=== College career ===
Warburton played right wing for Dartmouth College, and he became part of a powerhouse line for Dartmouth with eventual Olympic teammates, Bruce Mather at center and Bruce Cunliffe on the left wing. This line not only led Dartmouth in scoring for two seasons, but helped Dartmouth achieve a remarkable 46-game unbeaten streak (45-0-1) from 1941–42 to 1944–45. Warburton set a career-high for points in a single game on January 20, 1945, as he registered 7 points against Cornell University, with five goals and two assists. For the 1946–47 season Warburton was elected captain of the team. During this season he added two more four-goal performances against Army and Boston College. The two high-scoring games came in close succession, with the first occurring on February 8, 1946, and the second coming just three days later on February 11, 1946. Dartmouth ended the 1946–47 season as the number one ranked team in the nation. The number one ranking was more significant at the time since it was before the advent of NCAA hockey championships.

=== 1948 Olympics ===
In 1948, Warburton headed to St. Moritz, Switzerland to take part in the Olympic Games with his fellow linemates. Unfortunately due to a conflict over what truly constituted an amateur athlete, two United States teams were sent. It was a situation that nearly caused the cancellation of the entire ice hockey tournament at the 1948 Olympics. Eventually a compromise was made and Warburton's squad was allowed to compete, but were ineligible for medal contention.

=== Later career ===
He continued to play hockey after the Olympics first with the Milwaukee Clarks and later was reunited with Bruce Mather on the Boston Olympics. Warburton's best post-college year came during the 1950–51 season while playing for the Olympics in the Eastern Hockey League. In that year Warburton finished in the top ten in all three major offensive statistical categories. He ranked second in goals (33), tenth in assists (30), and sixth in points (63).

== Personal life and death ==
Warburton was born in Cranston, Rhode Island, on January 7, 1924. He died on December 25, 2021, at the age of 97. At age 94, he was honored by the Rhode Island Hockey Hall of Fame in 2018 with the Malcolm Greene Chace Award for "Lifetime contributions of a Rhode Islander to the game of ice hockey". He was inducted as an honored member of the Rhode Island Hockey Hall of Fame in 2022.

== Career statistics ==
			Regular season					Playoffs
Season	Team	League	GP	G	A	Pts	PIM	GP	G	A	Pts	PIM
1943–1947	Dartmouth College	NCAA	Statistics unavailable
1948	U.S. National Team	Oly	8	16	5	21	6	N/A
1948–49	Milwaukee Clarks	IHL	32	28	13	41	38	—	—	—	—	—
1949–50	Milwaukee Clarks	EHL	51	20	28	48	24	14	4	7	11	8
1950–51	Boston Olympics	EHL	54	33	30	63	24	6	4	0	4	6
1954–55	Worcester Warriors	EHL	Statistics unavailable
EHL totals			137	81	71	152	86	20	8	7	15	14
