= Sandy Air =

Canadian ice hockey player (1928–2024)

- Born: March 25, 1928 Toronto, Ontario, Canada
- Died: February 4, 2024 (aged 95) Alliston, Ontario, Canada
- Height: 5 ft 9 in (175 cm)
- Weight: 165 lb (75 kg; 11 st 11 lb)
- Position: Right wing
- Shot: Right
- Played for: Whitby Dunlops; Milwaukee Clarks; Kitchener-Waterloo Dutchmen; Moncton Hawks; Kansas City Royals
- National team: Canada
- Playing career: 1944–1960
Medal record
Men's ice hockey
Gold medal – first place	1958 Oslo	Ice hockey

Alexander Douglas Air (March 25, 1928 – February 4, 2024) was a Canadian ice hockey player. He played with the Whitby Dunlops, and won a gold medal at the 1958 World Ice Hockey Championships in Oslo, Norway. Air died in Alliston, Ontario on February 4, 2024, at the age of 95.

== Career statistics ==
			Regular season					Playoffs
Season	Team	League	GP	G	A	Pts	PIM	GP	G	A	Pts	PIM
1946-47	Stratford Kroehlers	OHA	25	6	10	16	7	—	—	—	—	—
1947-48	Oshawa Generals	OHA	29	8	13	21	15	—	—	—	—	—
1948-49	Milwaukee Clarks	IHL	32	17	28	45	27	8	4	5	9	18
1949-50	Milwaukee Clarks	EHL	49	15	34	49	21	14	2	8	10	0
1950-51	Moncton Hawks	MSHL	18	9	6	15	6	—	—	—	—	—
1950-51	Kansas City Cowboys/Royals	USHL	36	7	14	21	0	—	—	—	—	—
1951-52	Boston Olympics	EHL	66	30	50	80	0	4	0	3	3	2
1952-53	Washington Lions	EHL	39	11	21	32	4	6	1	8	9	0
1953-54	Niagara Falls Cataracts	OHASr	46	11	17	28	6	—	—	—	—	—
1956-57	Whitby Dunlops	OHASr	—	22	26	48	20	—	—	—	—	—
1957-58	Whitby Dunlops	OHASr	—	5	4	9	0	—	—	—	—	—
1958-59	Whitby Dunlops	OHASr	—	17	25	42	8	—	—	—	—	—
Totals			340	158	248	406	114	32	7	24	31	20
