= Bruce Mather (ice hockey) =

American ice hockey player

- Born: July 25, 1926 Belmont, Massachusetts, U.S.
- Died: October 9, 1975 (aged 49) New Providence, New Jersey, U.S.
- Height: 5 ft 9 in (175 cm)
- Weight: 150 lb (68 kg; 10 st 10 lb)
- Position: Center
- Shot: Left
- Played for: Worcester Warriors; Boston Olympics
- National team: United States
- Playing career: 1943–1955

Bruce Ellery Mather (July 25, 1926 – October 9, 1975) was an American ice hockey player. He was born in Belmont, Massachusetts. Mather was a member of the American 1948 Winter Olympics ice hockey team. He was inducted into the United States Hockey Hall of Fame in 1998.

== Playing career ==
=== Early years ===
Mather's career started in Belmont, where he played for his hometown Belmont High School. Possessing a quick shot and deceptive speed, Mather earned the nickname of “Little Poison” during his time at Belmont High. His strong play during his high school career would allow him to go on and play for Dartmouth College; while there Mather would center future Olympic teammates Bruce Cunliffe and Ralph Warburton. This line would prove to be highly successful as it would lead Dartmouth in scoring for two seasons and with the aid of his two wingers Mather would record a minimum of 6 points in a game an amazing 7 times including a 10-point game vs. Middlebury College on February 2, 1944. The trio would also be a big component in helping Dartmouth achieve an astonishing 46-game unbeaten streak (45–0–1) from 1941–42 to 1944–45. In 1947 Mather would lead Dartmouth in scoring, tallying 56 points and helping them to a 16–2–2 record. The 1947 season would also see one of Mather’s career highlights as he scored a crucial game winning goal to help Dartmouth defeat Michigan in Ann Arbor. The win would clinch the number one ranking in the country, which was significant given there was no NCAA Tournament during this time.

=== International career ===
Mather’s strong play, along with that of his line mates at Dartmouth, led to an invitation to play on the United States Olympic team for the whole line. The 1948 Winter Olympics held in St. Moritz, Switzerland, however, were not without their share of controversy. Due to a dispute with the Olympic Committee, the US team was allowed to compete and have the results of their games count in the standings, but they were not eligible to win a medal. This did not slow Mather as he played in all eight US games, leading them in scoring with 16 goals and 27 points. The tournament was also witness to another of Mather’s career highlights when he scored an impressive five goals against Austria. Overall, his strong play helped the United States finish the tournament in what would have been 4th place, had they not essentially been disqualified. Mather also represented the United States in the 1949 World Championships held in Stockholm, Sweden, winning a bronze medal.

=== Later career ===
Mather continued his hockey career playing for the Boston Olympics in the Eastern Hockey League. Where Mather gained notoriety as one of the best Americans on a team that not only played Eastern powers but against Canadian powers from the Quebec Senior Leagues, Mather was even selected as an All-League center. In 1950 Mather signed with the Boston Bruins; unfortunately he would never play a game for the B’s. However he would make frequent appearances in benefit games with the "old time Bruins".

After his playing days Mather shared his knowledge of the game, becoming a coach for youth hockey.

Mather died suddenly in 1975 at age 49.

== Career statistics ==
			Regular Season					Playoffs
Season	Team	League	GP	G	A	Pts	PIM	GP	G	A	Pts	PIM
1943–1947	Dartmouth College	NCAA	33	55	66	121	?	N/A
1948	U.S. National Team	Oly	8	15	8	23	8	N/A
1948-49	Boston Olympics	QSHL	18	6	10	16	4	--	--	--	--	--
1948-49	U.S. National Team	International	42	65	48	113	0	N/A
1949-50	Boston Olympics	EHL	41	32	24	56	9	4	0	2	2	0
1950-51	Boston Olympics	EHL	52	26	36	62	17	6	2	4	6	0
1954-55	Worcester Warriors	EHL	3	3	2	5	0	--	--	--	--	--
EHL totals			96	61	62	123	26	10	2	6	8	0
