= Red Martin =

American ice hockey player (1938–2017)

- Born: July 5, 1938 Boston, Massachusetts
- Died: July 27, 2017 (aged 79)
- Height: 6 ft 0 in (183 cm)
- Weight: 200 lb (91 kg; 14 st 4 lb)
- Position: Defense
- Shot: Right
- Played for: Boston College; Rockland Estes; Braintree Hawks
- National team: United States
- Playing career: 1958–1971

Thomas Joseph "Red" Martin (July 5, 1938 – July 27, 2017) was an American ice hockey player who competed in the 1964 Winter Olympics. In 1964 he participated with the American ice hockey team in the Winter Olympics tournament. Martin later founded Cramer, a brand experience agency.

== Awards and honors ==
Award	Year
AHCA East All-American	1959–60; 1960–61

== See also ==
- List of Olympic men's ice hockey players for the United States
