= David Brooks (ice hockey) =

American retired ice hockey player

Dave Brooks
- Born: December 27, 1939 (age 86) Saint Paul, Minnesota, U.S.
- Height: 5 ft 8 in (173 cm)
- Weight: 146 lb (66 kg; 10 st 6 lb)
- Position: Centre
- National team: United States
- Playing career: 1959–1967

David Alan "Dave" Brooks (born December 27, 1939) is an American retired ice hockey player who competed in the 1964 Winter Olympics. He is the younger brother of Herb Brooks.

In 1964, he participated with the American ice hockey team in the Winter Olympics tournament, where he set the record for most penalty minutes in a single tournament by an American.

== See also ==
List of Olympic men's ice hockey players for the United States
