= Dan Dilworth =

American ice hockey player

- Born: February 23, 1942 International Falls, MN, USA
- Died: September 27, 2007 (aged 65)
- Height: 5 ft 8 in (173 cm)
- Weight: 170 lb (77 kg; 12 st 2 lb)
- Position: Right wing
- Played for: Fort Frances Canadiens; St. Paul Saints; Waterloo Black Hawks; Grand Rapids Bruins
- National team: United States
- Playing career: 1960–1969

Daniel Joseph Dilworth (born February 23, 1942, in International Falls, Minnesota - d. September 27, 2007) was an American ice hockey player who competed in the 1964 Winter Olympics.

In 1964 he participated with the American ice hockey team in the Winter Olympics tournament.

== See also ==
List of Olympic men's ice hockey players for the United States
