= Herb Vaningen =

American ice hockey player

Herbert Terrell Van Ingen Jr.
- Born: November 17, 1924 Manhattan, New York, U.S.
- Died: January 8, 2010 (aged 85) Greenwich, Connecticut, U.S.
- Position: Goaltender
- Played for: Team USA
- National team: United States
- Playing career: 1947–1948

Herbert Terrell Vaningen Jr. (November 17, 1924 – January 8, 2010) was an American ice hockey goaltender who competed in ice hockey at the 1948 Winter Olympics.

Vaningen was a member of the American ice hockey team which played eight games, but was disqualified, at the 1948 Winter Olympics. Vaningen played in two games as the goaltender.
