= Dick Rondeau =

American ice hockey player

Biographical details
- Born: December 18, 1921; Providence, Rhode Island, U.S.
- Died: January 18, 1989 (aged 67); Dallas, Texas, U.S.

Playing career
- 1941–1944: Dartmouth
- Position: Forward

Coaching career (HC unless noted)
- 1942–1943: Dartmouth
- 1952–1956: Providence

Head coaching record
- Overall: 39–41–1 (.488)

Richard Rondeau (December 18, 1921 – January 18, 1989) was an American ice hockey player. Born in Providence, Rhode Island, Rondeau played his college hockey at Dartmouth College and was a member of the 1942 NCAA championship team. The team won 21 games and lost 2, while Rondeau led the nation in scoring with 45 goals and 32 assists. Dartmouth would go on to win 41 straight games over 4 years. Rondeau captained the 1943 team as well, and also served as coach when Coach Eddie Jeremiah entered the Navy in mid-season. He was captain again in 1944. Over his four-year college career, Rondeau shattered nearly all of the school's scoring records, tallying 103 goals and 73 assists for an average of 4.4 points per game. Rondeau still holds eight Collegiate Ice Hockey records, including most goals and assists in one game (12 goals, 11 assists); however, because he played before NCAA sponsorship, none of his marks are currently recognized nationally. Signed by the Boston Bruins, Rondeau's professional career was cut short due to an accident during military service. Rondeau played professionally in the Pacific Coast Hockey League for the San Diego Skyhawks and later the Atlantic Hockey League for the New Haven Bears before leaving for active duty in the Pacific. He was inducted into the United States Hockey Hall of Fame in 1985. He died in Dallas, Texas, in 1989. Rondeau was inducted as a charter member of the Rhode Island Hockey Hall of Fame in 2018.

== Statistics ==
=== Regular season and playoffs ===
			Regular season					Playoffs
Season	Team	League	GP	G	A	Pts	PIM	GP	G	A	Pts	PIM
1941–42	Dartmouth	NCAA	—	45	31	76	—	—	—	—	—	—
1942–43	Dartmouth	NCAA	—	27	22	49	—	—	—	—	—	—
1943–44	Dartmouth	NCAA	—	31	20	51	—	—	—	—	—	—
NCAA totals			40	103	73	176	—	—	—	—	—	—

== Head coaching record ==
Record table
Season	Team	Overall	Conference	Standing	Postseason
Dartmouth Indians (Quadrangular League) (1942–1943)
1942–43 †	Dartmouth	14–0–1			
Dartmouth:		14–0–1			
Providence Friars Independent (1952–1956)
1952–53	Providence	6–8–0			
1953–54	Providence	4–10–0			
1954–55	Providence	8–7–0			
1955–56	Providence	7–16–0			
Providence:		25–41–0			
Total:		39–41–1			
National champion Postseason invitational champion Conference regular season champion Conference regular season and conference tournament champion Division regular season champion Division regular season and conference tournament champion Conference tournament champion

† Rondeau shared interim coaching duties with the football team's assistant coach George T. Barclay.
