= Worcester Warriors (ice hockey) =

American ice hockey team

The Worcester Warriors were a professional ice hockey team located in Worcester, Massachusetts. They played 2 seasons from 1954–1956, the first year in the Eastern Hockey League and the second in the Atlantic Hockey League. The city is now home to the Worcester Railers HC of the ECHL.
