= Arnold Oss =

American ice hockey player (1928–2024)

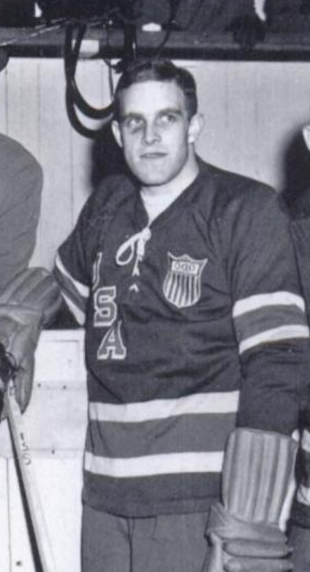

Personal information
- Born: April 18, 1928 Minneapolis, Minnesota, U.S.
- Died: November 10, 2024 (aged 96) Rio Verde, Arizona, U.S.
Medal record
Men's ice hockey
Representing United States
Olympic Games
Silver medal – second place	1952 Oslo	Team competition

Arnold Carl Oss Jr. (April 18, 1928 – November 10, 2024) was an American ice hockey player. He won a silver medal at the 1952 Winter Olympics.

== Biography ==
Oss was born on April 18, 1928 in Minneapolis, Minnesota, the son of Arnold and Frances Oss. He attended Dartmouth College in the late 1940s. While at Dartmouth, he was a defenseman for the ice hockey team. He graduated in 1950. Oss won a silver medal at the 1952 Winter Olympics.

Oss died in Rio Verde, Arizona on November 10, 2024, at the age of 96.

== Awards and honors ==
Award	Year
AHCA First Team All-American	1949–50
