= Milwaukee Clarks =

Professional ice hockey team

- City: Milwaukee, Wisconsin
- League: IHL (1948–49); EAHL (1949–50)
- Operated: 1948–1950
- Colors: Navy Blue and Orange

The Milwaukee Clarks were a professional ice hockey team in Milwaukee, Wisconsin. They were a member of the International Hockey League in 1948–1949 and the Eastern Amateur Hockey League in 1949–1950.

The Clarks were sponsored by Clark's Super Gas service stations, and took their team colors and logo directly from the oil company.

== Season-by-season results ==
Season	League	Games	Won	Lost	Tied	Points	Goals For	Goals Against
1948–49	IHL	32	16	15	1	33	148	139
1949–50	EAHL	51	19	24	8	46	191	210
