= Clifford Harrison =

American ice hockey player

Personal information
- Full name: Clifford Harrison
- Born: October 27, 1927 Walpole, Massachusetts, U.S.
- Died: December 15, 1988 (aged 61)
Medal record
Representing United States
Men's Ice Hockey
Silver medal – second place	1952 Oslo	Team

Clifford "Cliff" Harrison (October 30, 1927 – December 15, 1988) was an American ice hockey player who competed in the Olympic Games in 1952. He was a member of the national team that won the silver medal in Oslo. He was born in Walpole, Massachusetts. He attended Dartmouth College.

== Awards and honors ==
Award	Year
AHCA First Team All-American	1950–51
