= Boston Olympics =

The Boston Olympics are a defunct ice hockey team which operated as a farm team for the Boston Bruins. They began play during the 1940–41 Eastern Amateur Hockey League season. The Olympics were often referred to by the shortened name the ‘Pics and the franchise remained active until the 1951–52 season.

== Franchise history ==
Founded by Hockey Hall of Fame builder Walter A. Brown, the ‘Pics were an amateur club for the talent around Boston, joining the EAHL for the 1940–1941 season. Not long after joining the EAHL the Olympics were facing a diminished talent pool with World War II beginning in Europe. In order to secure talent for his club Brown worked out an agreement with the Boston Bruins to be their farm team. It was a major success for the Olympics and led to them winning the league championship (Boardwalk Trophy) four consecutive years from 1944 to 1947 and a total of five during their 12 year existence. The Olympics success would not translate to a league wide success and by the beginning of the 1948 season only two teams (the Olympics and the New York Rovers) were able to field teams forcing the EAHL to shut down for the season. Both teams would join the Quebec Senior Hockey League (who the EAHL had interleague games with for a few seasons) for the 1948–1949 season with disastrous results. On 17 December 1948 citing poor attendance at home games and being unable to compete in a league just a step below pro the Boston Olympics withdrew from the QSHL in midseason. The Olympics would return to the EAHL for the 1949–1950 season, but the league would not last for much longer. Following the 1951–1952 season and losing money thanks to the 1949 Midwest expansion of EAHL the Boston Olympics folded.

== Season-by-season results ==
Season	League	Games	Won	Lost	Tied	Points	Goals For	Goals Against
1940–41	EAHL	65	23	36	6	52	203	242
1941–42	EAHL	60	34	20	6	74	263	218
1942–43	EAHL	46	24	21	1	49	186	184
1943–44	EAHL	45	39	4	2	80	Statistics unavailable
1944–45	EAHL	48	32	13	3	67	Statistics unavailable
1945–46	EAHL	52	32	12	8	72	258	162
1946–47	EAHL	56	25	26	5	55	284	273
1947–48	EAHL*	48	14	29	5	33	139	177
1947–48	QSHL*	47	12	35	0	24	178	289
1948–49	QSHL	26	7	18	1	15	99	166
1949–50	EAHL	43	16	20	7	39	146	169
1950–51	EAHL	54	25	24	5	55	187	191
1951–52	EAHL	66	38	27	1	77	246	240

- - played a split season between the Eastern Hockey League and Quebec Senior Hockey League during the 1947-48 season.

== All-time franchise leaders ==
Games Played - 174 by Ty Anderson
Goals - 101 by Eddie Barry
Assists - 86 by Bob Schnurr
Points - 161 by Bob Schnurr
PIMs - 272 by Eddie Barry

- Career information may be inaccurate due to incomplete data made available by the league.
