= Bruce Cunliffe =

American ice hockey player

- Born: August 19, 1925 Keene, NH, USA
- Died: April 6, 1989 (aged 63)
- Position: Right wing
- Shot: Right
- National team: United States
- Playing career: 1947–1948

Bruce Fergusson Cunliffe (August 19, 1925 – April 6, 1989) was an American ice hockey player who competed in ice hockey at the 1948 Winter Olympics.

Cunliffe was a member of the American ice hockey team which played eight games but was disqualified, at the 1948 Winter Olympics hosted by St. Moritz, Switzerland.
